= List of songs recorded by Paul McCartney =

Songs recorded by English musician

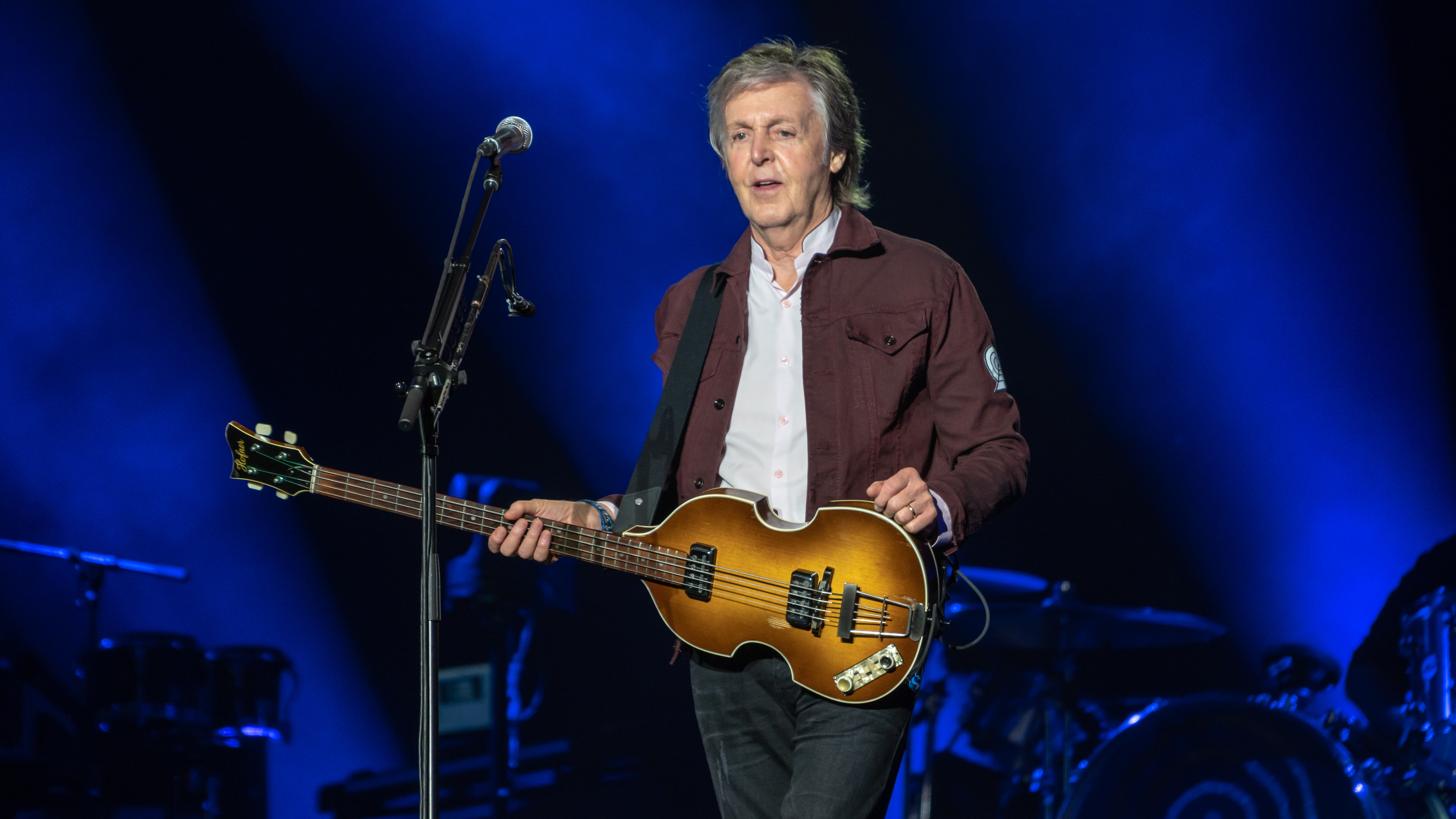
Paul McCartney performing in 2018

Paul McCartney is an English musician who has recorded hundreds of songs over his career of more than sixty years. As a member of the Beatles, he formed a songwriting partnership with his bandmate John Lennon that became the most celebrated in music history. Some of McCartney's famous Beatles compositions include "Hey Jude", "Penny Lane", "Let It Be" and "Yesterday", the last of which being one of the most covered songs of all time. After the band's break-up, he recorded his 1970 lo-fi album McCartney, which he composed and performed alone, containing songs including "Maybe I'm Amazed". It was followed by his first solo single, "Another Day", and Ram (1971), which he recorded with wife Linda McCartney.

For the remainder of the 1970s, McCartney released music with the rock band Wings, recording many of his well-known songs, including "Live and Let Die", "Jet", "Band on the Run", "Listen to What the Man Said", "Silly Love Songs", "Let 'Em In" and "Mull of Kintyre". Wings went through numerous line-up changes, but were primarily composed of the core trio of the McCartneys and English musician Denny Laine. Before the break-up of Wings in 1981, McCartney recorded the 1979 Christmas song "Wonderful Christmastime" and his second solo album, McCartney II (1980), which showcased a new wave, synth-pop and electronica style, evident on "Coming Up" and "Temporary Secretary". Like his first solo album, he composed and performed it alone. In 2020, McCartney released McCartney III, which he composed, performed and produced alone, like its two predecessors.

Following the break-up of Wings, McCartney released his third solo album, Tug of War, in 1982, which featured contributions from Stevie Wonder ("Ebony and Ivory" and "What's That You're Doing") and Carl Perkins ("Get It") and the song "Here Today", a tribute to former Beatle John Lennon after his murder in December 1980. Around this time, McCartney collaborated with Michael Jackson on "The Girl Is Mine" from Jackson's 1982 album Thriller and again a year later on "Say Say Say" and "The Man" on McCartney's album Pipes of Peace. His next single, "No More Lonely Nights", featured a guitar solo from Pink Floyd guitarist David Gilmour. Other producers and musicians with whom McCartney has collaborated include Hugh Padgham (Press to Play), Elvis Costello (Flowers in the Dirt), Jeff Lynne (Flaming Pie), David Kahne (Driving Rain and Memory Almost Full), and Nigel Godrich (Chaos and Creation in the Backyard). In the 2010s, McCartney has recorded music with Kanye West ("Only One", "FourFiveSeconds" with Rihanna, and "All Day"), the surviving members of Nirvana (Note: Dave Grohl, Krist Novoselic and Pat Smear) ("Cut Me Some Slack"), Greg Kurstin and Ryan Tedder (Egypt Station), and Andrew Watt (The Boys of Dungeon Lane).

In addition to writing his own songs, McCartney has recorded cover versions of songs throughout his career, most notably on CHOBA B CCCP (1988), Run Devil Run (1999), and Kisses on the Bottom (2012). He also produced Thrillington, an instrumental cover album of Ram in the jazz and lounge genres under the name Percy "Thrills" Thrillington. In addition to rock and pop music, McCartney has experimented with different genres since the 1990s. He has released five albums in the classical music genre, beginning in 1991 with Liverpool Oratorio up until 2011's Ocean's Kingdom, based on the ballet of the same name; he experimented with orchestral music on Working Classical (1999) with the London Symphony Orchestra. He collaborated with producer Youth under the name the Fireman, recording three electronica albums: Strawberries Oceans Ships Forest (1993), Rushes (1998) and Electric Arguments (2008). Another electronica release was Liverpool Sound Collage (2000) with Super Furry Animals and Youth. McCartney also wrote and performed "Hope for the Future", the ending song for the 2014 video game Destiny.

== Solo career ==
Key
†	Indicates song not written or co-written by Paul McCartney

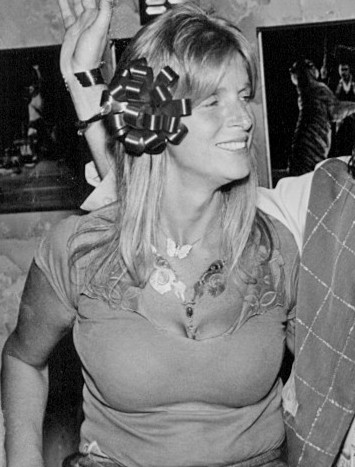
McCartney's first wife Linda McCartney (pictured in 1976) recorded the album Ram with her husband and recorded music with Wings as well.

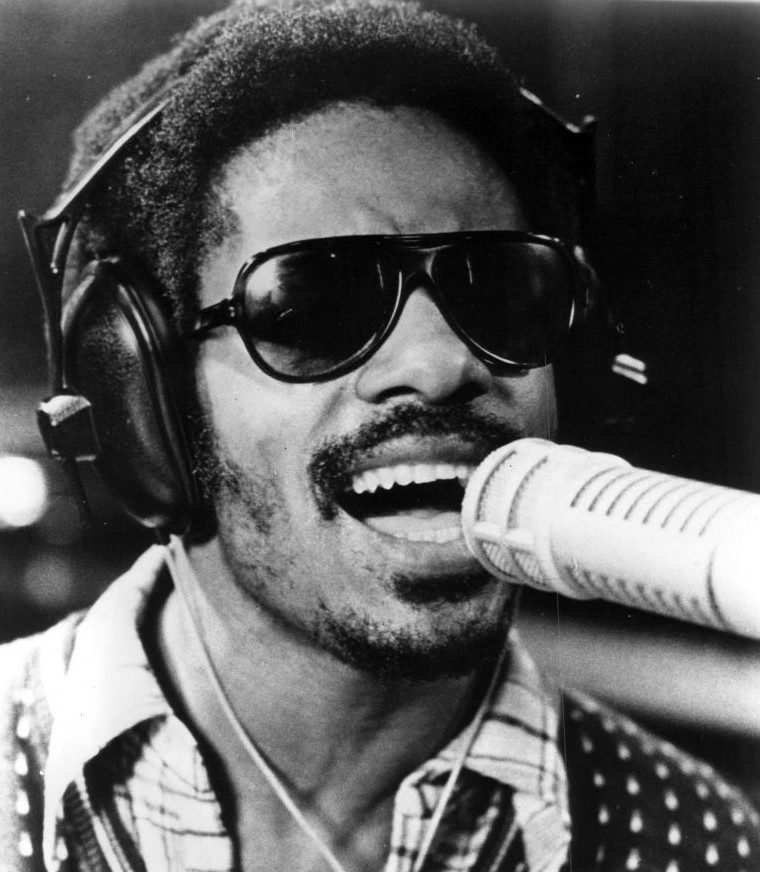
Stevie Wonder (pictured in 1973) recorded "Ebony and Ivory" and "What's That You're Doing" with McCartney in 1982.

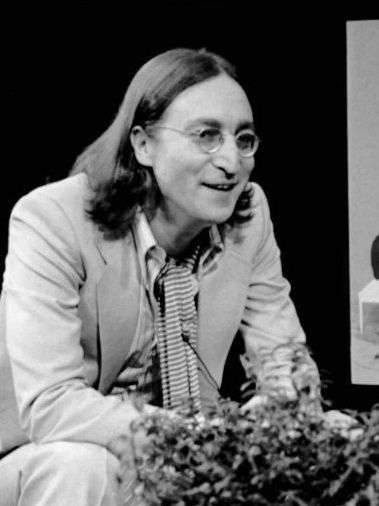
McCartney's 1982 song "Here Today" is a tribute to McCartney's former songwriting partner John Lennon, after his murder in December 1980.

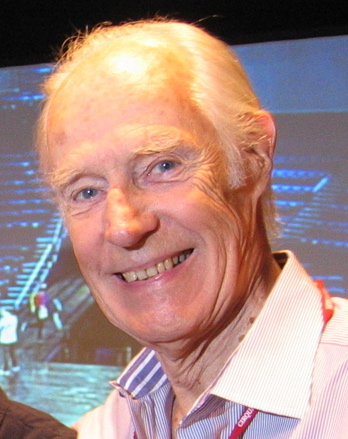
McCartney's albums Tug of War (1982) and Pipes of Peace (1983) were produced by former Beatles producer George Martin (pictured in 2006).

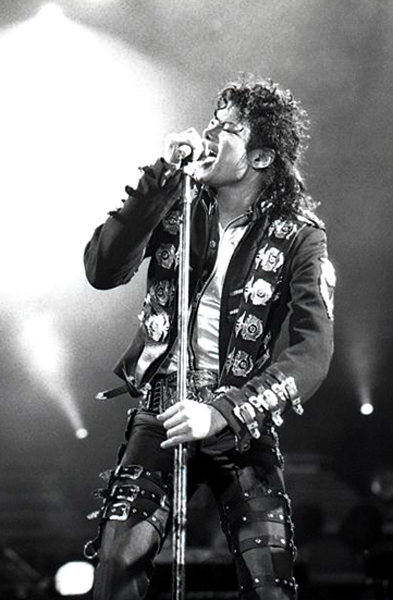
McCartney collaborated with Michael Jackson (pictured in 1988) on the songs "The Girl Is Mine", "Say Say Say" and "The Man".

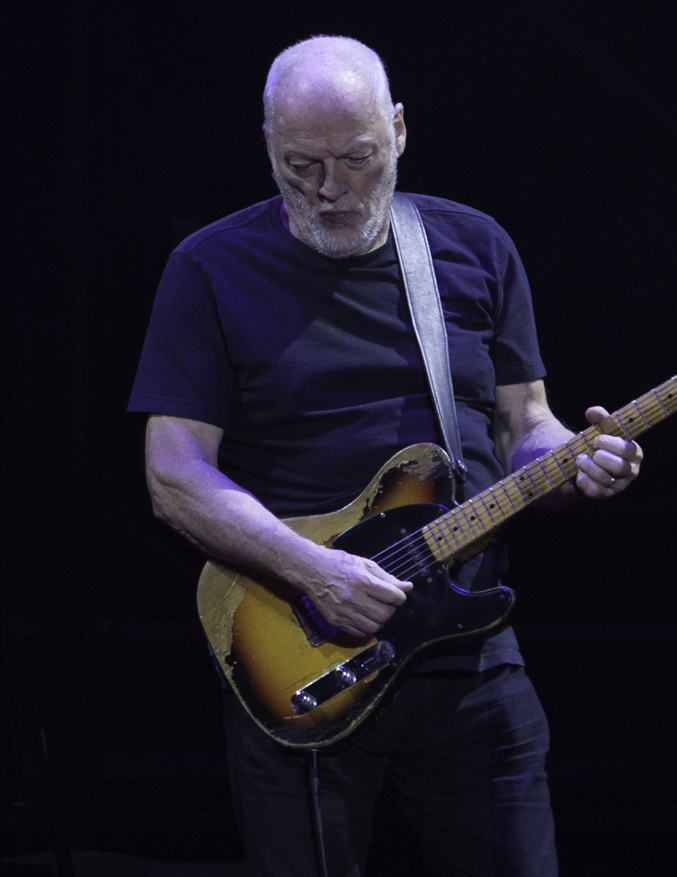
Pink Floyd guitarist David Gilmour (pictured in 2015) performed the guitar solo on McCartney's 1984 song "No More Lonely Nights".

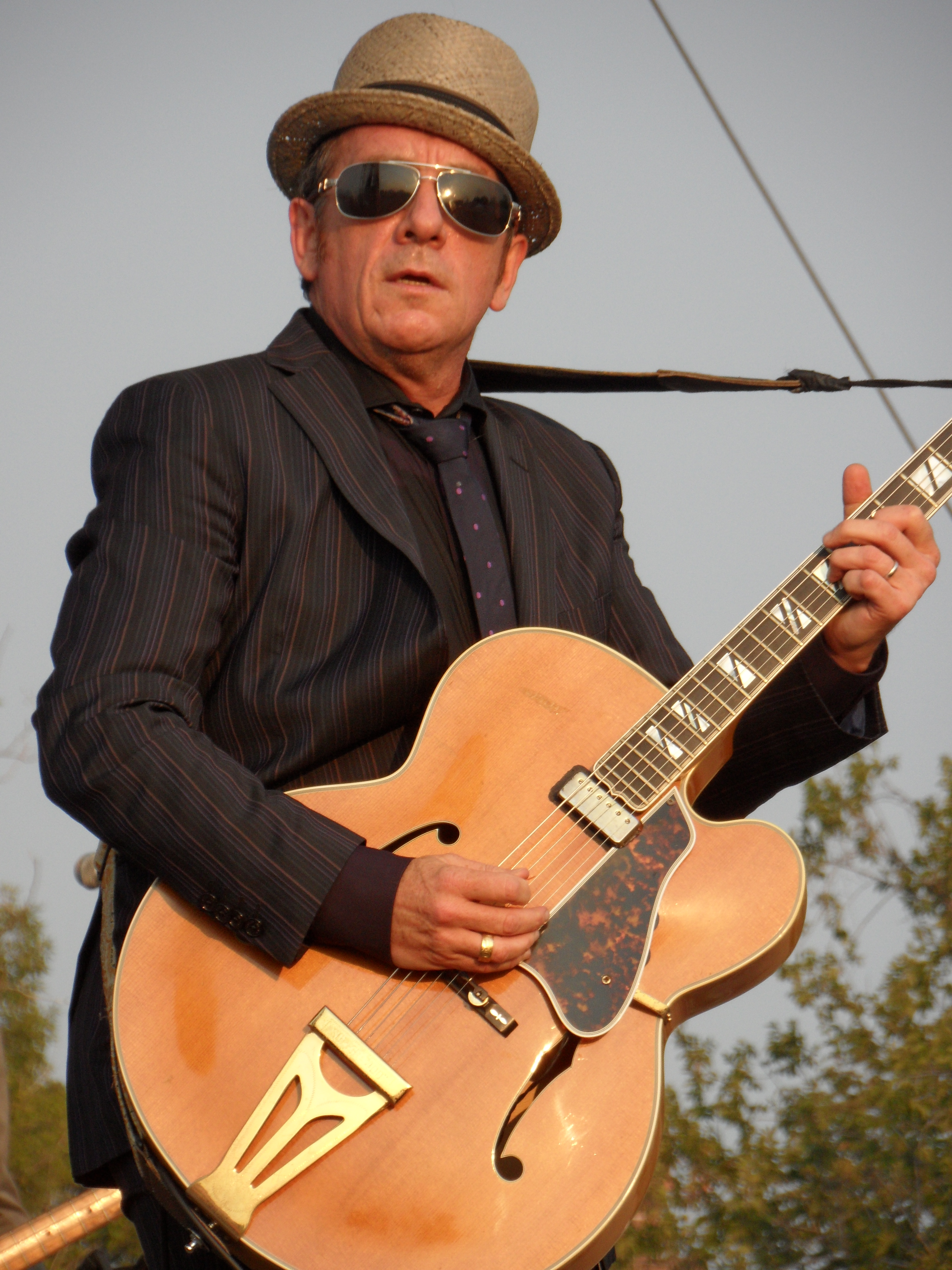
McCartney worked with Elvis Costello (pictured in 2012) for his 1989 album Flowers in the Dirt.

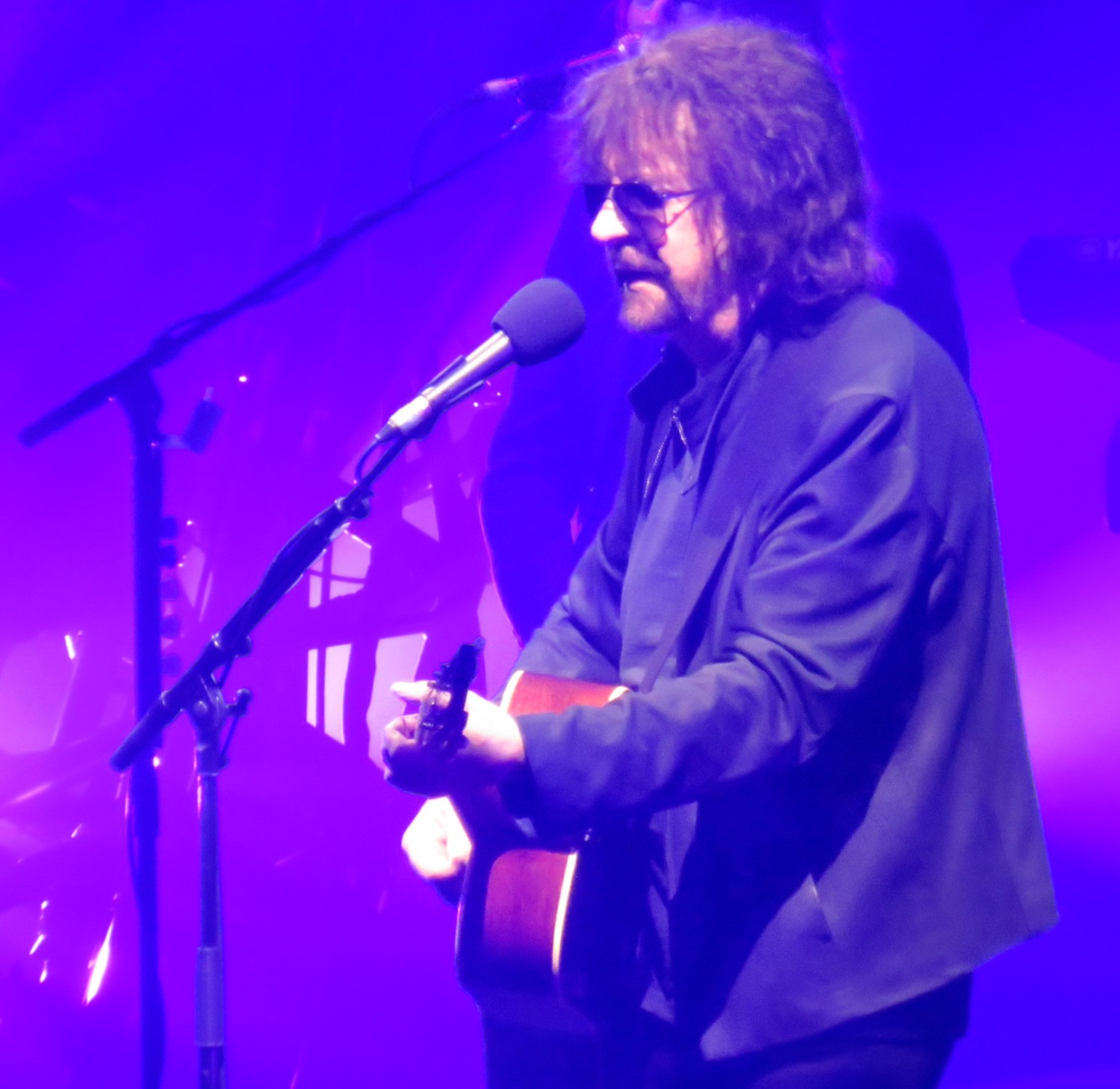
McCartney worked with Jeff Lynne (pictured in 2016) for his 1997 album Flaming Pie.

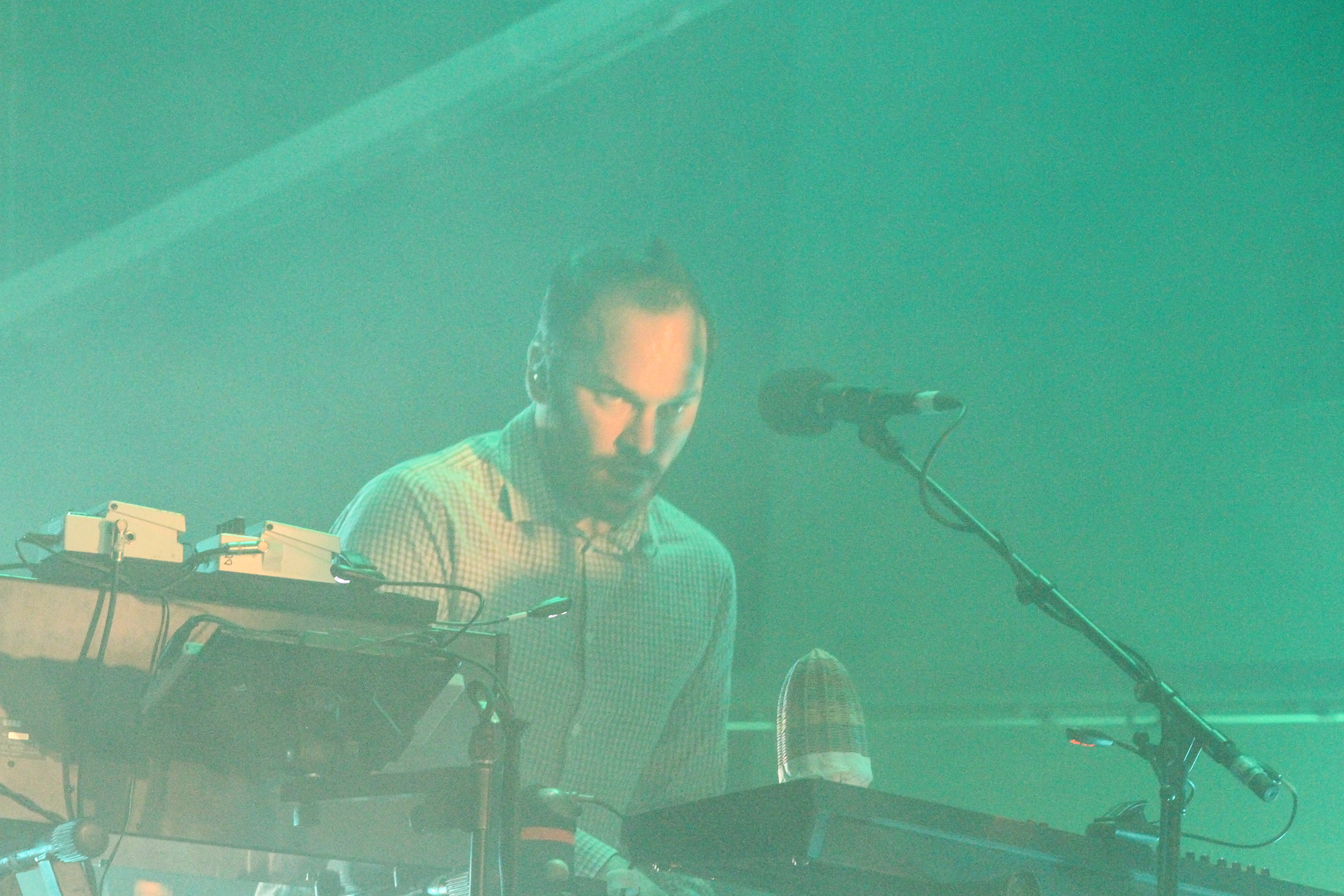
McCartney's 2005 album Chaos and Creation in the Backyard was produced by Nigel Godrich (pictured in 2013).

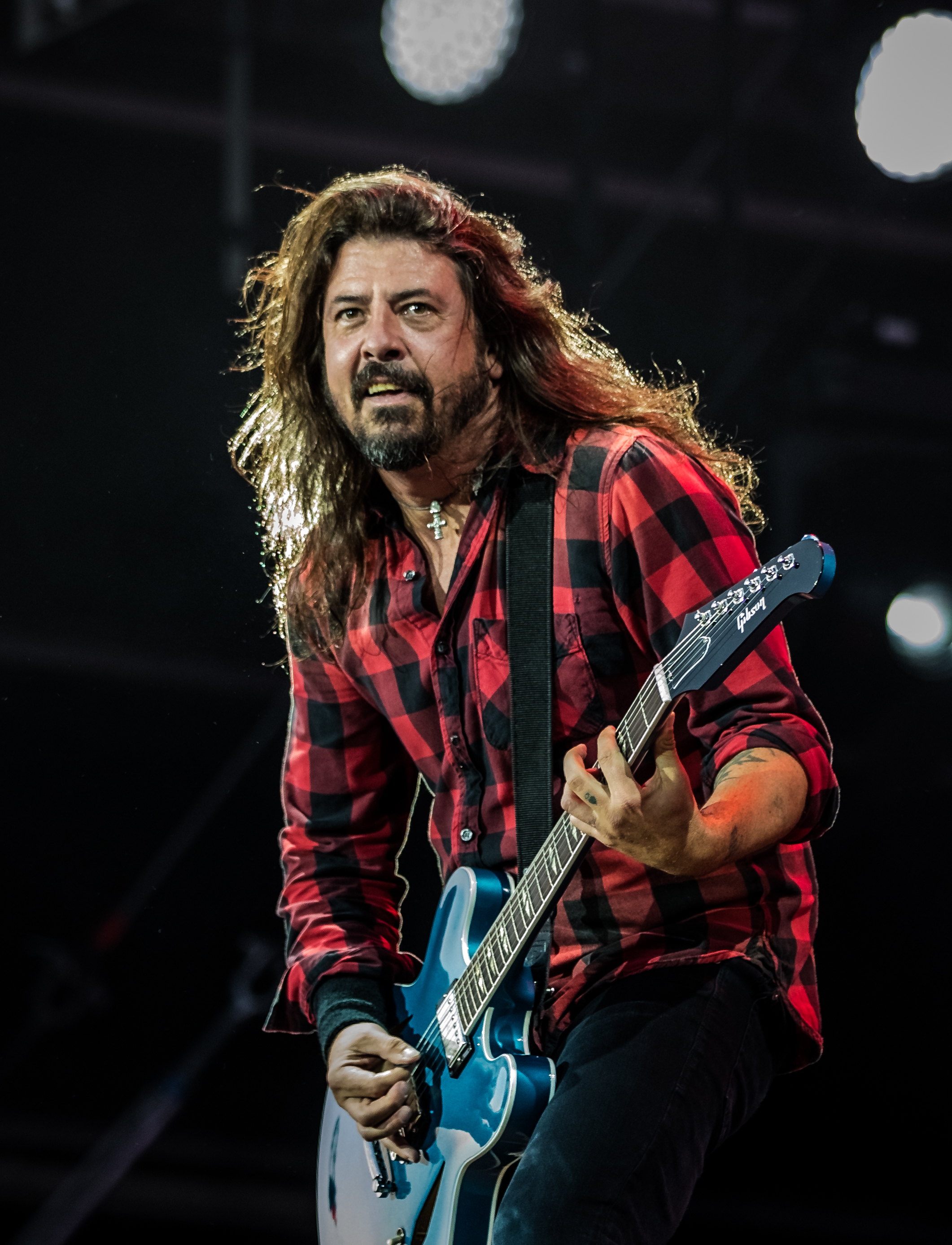
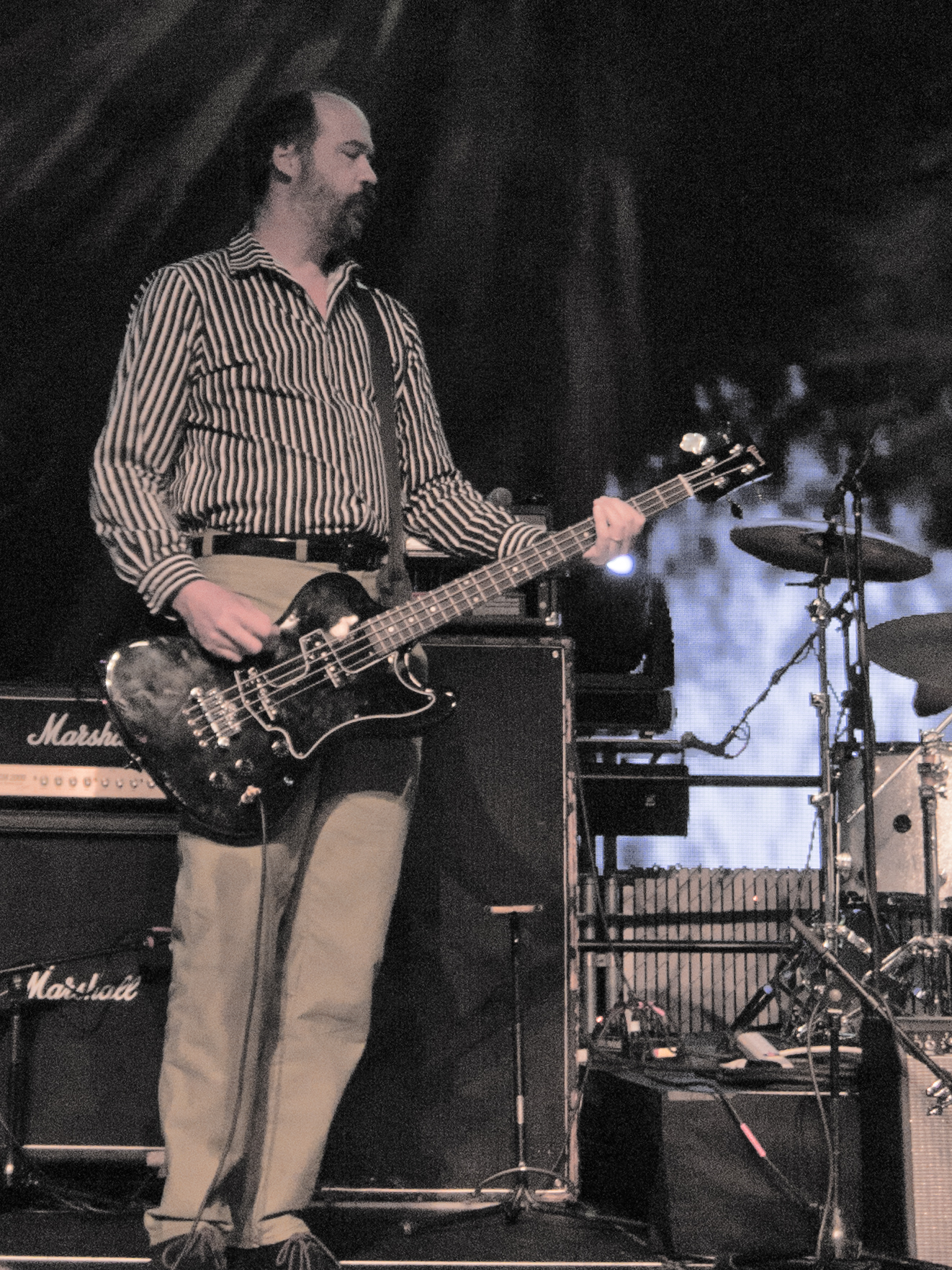
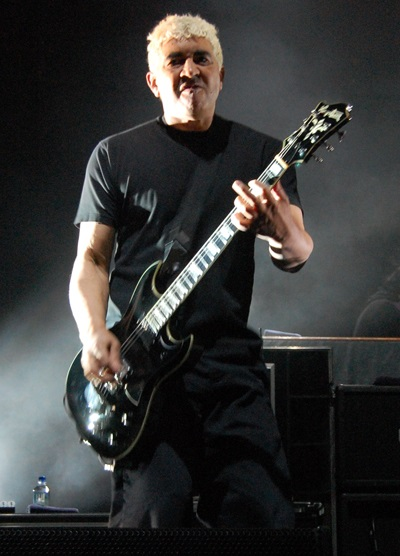
McCartney recorded the song "Cut Me Some Slack" in 2012 with the surviving members of Nirvana: Dave Grohl (top), Krist Novoselic (middle), and Pat Smear (bottom).

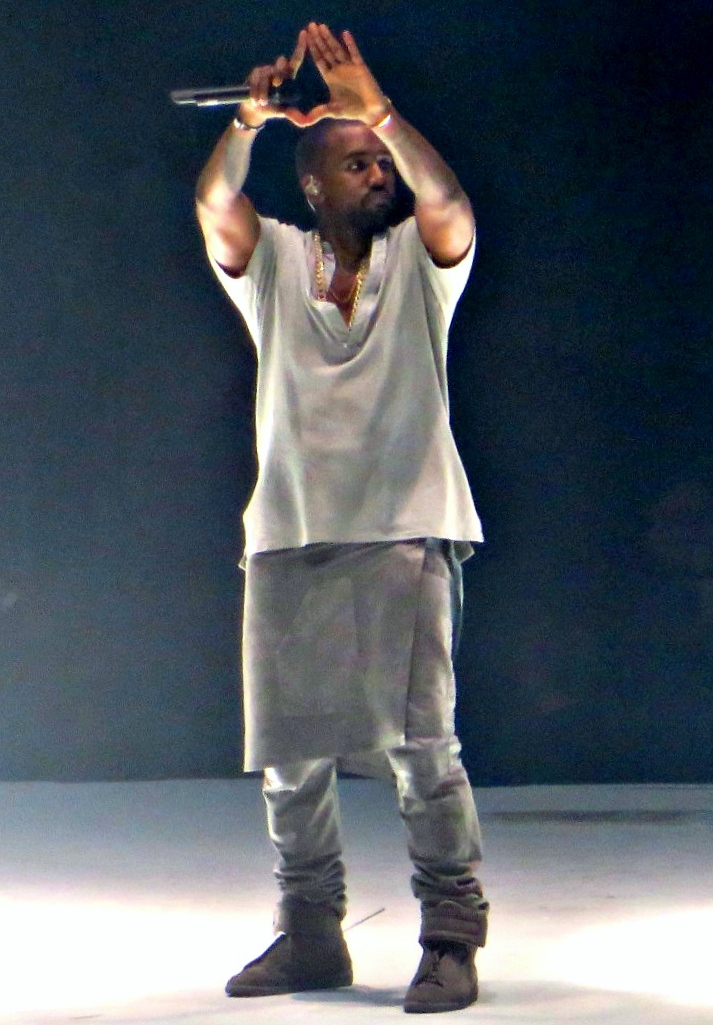
McCartney collaborated with rapper Kanye West (pictured in 2013) on the songs "Only One", "FourFiveSeconds" and "All Day".

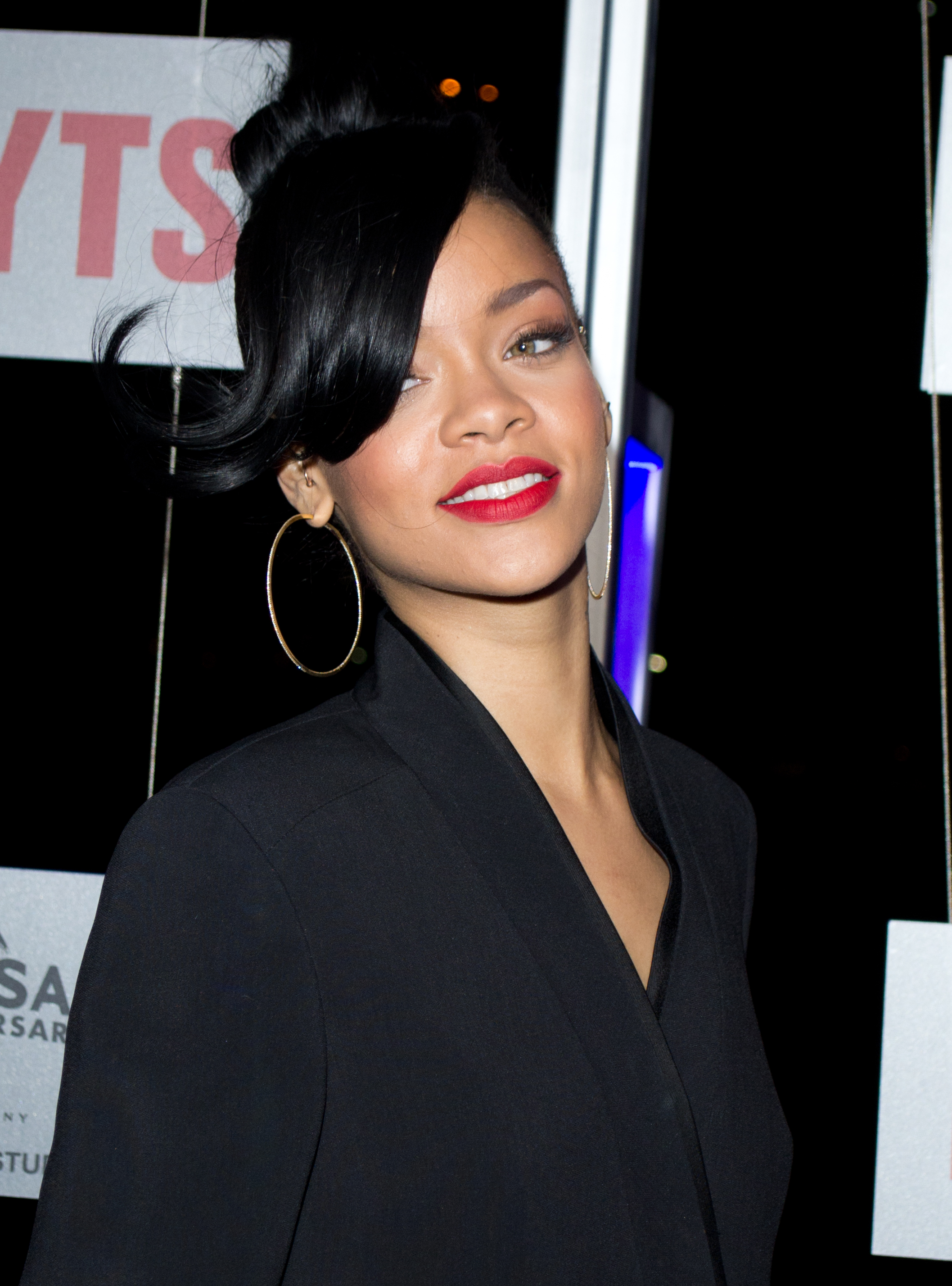
McCartney recorded "FourFiveSeconds" with Barbadian singer Rihanna (pictured in 2012) and Kanye West.

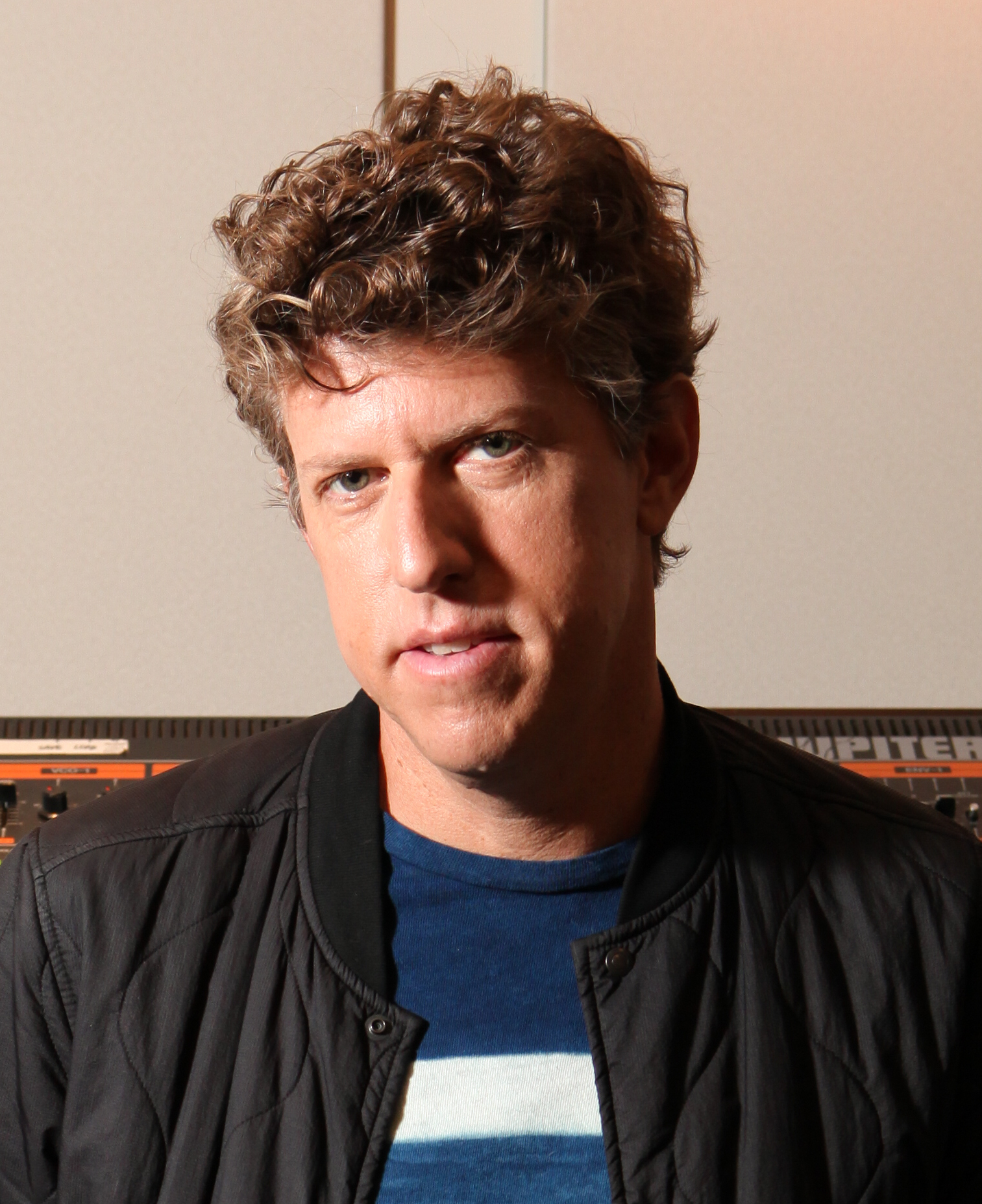
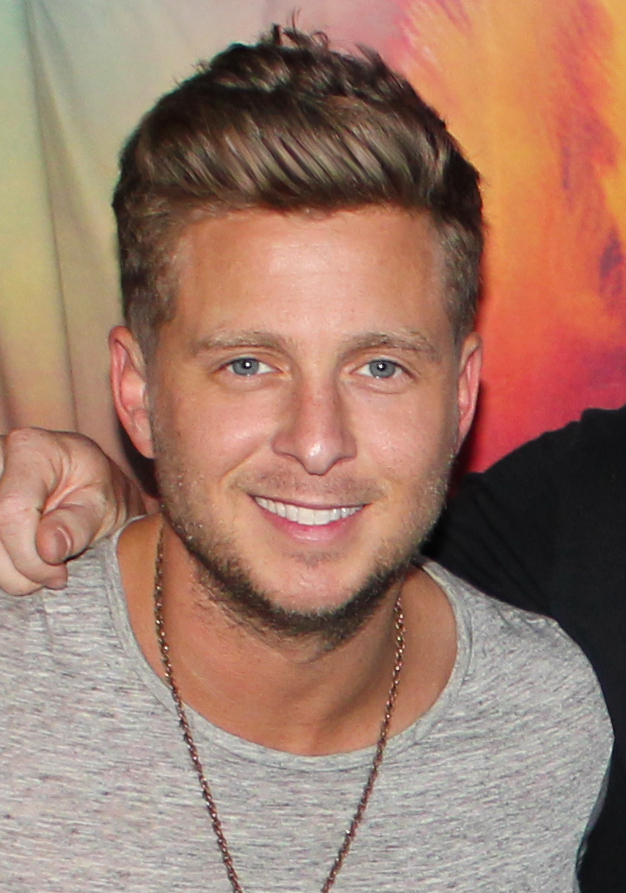
McCartney worked with producers Greg Kurstin (top) and Ryan Tedder (bottom) for his 2018 album Egypt Station.

Name of song, artist, writer(s), original release and year of release
Song	Artist	Writer(s)	Original release	Year	Ref.
"222"	Paul McCartney	Paul McCartney	Memory Almost Full (2-CD edition)	2007	
"3 Legs"	Paul and Linda McCartney	Paul McCartney	Ram	1971	
"About You"	Paul McCartney	Paul McCartney	Driving Rain	2001	
"Ac-Cent-Tchu-Ate the Positive" (Johnny Mercer cover)	Paul McCartney	Harold Arlen; Johnny Mercer †	Kisses on the Bottom	2012	
"Ain't No Sunshine" (live) (Bill Withers cover)	Paul McCartney	Bill Withers †	Unplugged (The Official Bootleg)	1991	
"Ain't That a Shame" (Fats Domino cover)	Paul McCartney	Antoine Domino; Dave Bartholomew †	CHOBA B CCCP	1988	
"All Day"	Kanye West featuring Theophilus London, Allan Kingdom and Paul McCartney	Kanye West; Paul McCartney; Velous; Kendrick Lamar; French Montana; Ernest Brown; Cydel Young; Vic Mensa; Allan Kingdom; Mike Dean; Che Pope; Noah Goldstein; Allen Ritter; Mario Winans; Charles Njapa; Malik Yusef; Plain Pat; Ab-Liva; Noel Ellis	Non-album single	2015	
"All My Trials" (live)	Paul McCartney	Trad. arr. Paul McCartney †	Tripping the Live Fantastic: Highlights!	1990	
"All Shook Up" (Elvis Presley cover)	Paul McCartney	Otis Blackwell; Elvis Presley †	Run Devil Run	1999	
"All Things Must Pass" (live)	Paul McCartney	George Harrison †	Concert for George	2003	
"All You Horse Riders/Blue Sway"	Paul McCartney	Paul McCartney	McCartney II (Archive Collection)	2011	
"Alligator"	Paul McCartney	Paul McCartney	New	2013	
"Always" (Henry Burr cover)	Paul McCartney	Irving Berlin †	Kisses on the Bottom	2012	
"Angry"	Paul McCartney	Paul McCartney; Eric Stewart	Press to Play	1986	
"Another Day"	Paul McCartney	Paul McCartney; Linda McCartney	Non-album single	1971	
"Anyway"	Paul McCartney	Paul McCartney	Chaos and Creation in the Backyard	2005	
"Appreciate"	Paul McCartney	Paul McCartney	New	2013	
"As You Lie There"	Paul McCartney	Paul McCartney; Andrew Watt	The Boys of Dungeon Lane	2026	
"At the Mercy"	Paul McCartney	Paul McCartney	Chaos and Creation in the Backyard	2005	
"Atlantic Ocean"	Paul McCartney	Paul McCartney	Oobu Joobu	1995	
"Average Person"	Paul McCartney	Paul McCartney	Pipes of Peace	1983	
"Back in Brazil"	Paul McCartney	Paul McCartney	Egypt Station	2018	
"Back in the Sunshine Again"	Paul McCartney	Paul McCartney; James McCartney	Driving Rain	2001	
"Back on My Feet"	Paul McCartney	Paul McCartney; Declan MacManus	B-side to "Once Upon a Long Ago"	1987	
"The Back Seat of My Car"	Paul and Linda McCartney	Paul McCartney	Ram	1971	
"The Ballad of the Skeletons"	Allen Ginsberg with Paul McCartney	Paul McCartney; Allen Ginsberg; Philip Glass	The Ballad Of The Skeletons EP	1996	
"Ballroom Dancing" (Note: A re-recorded version appears on Give My Regards to Broad Street (1984).)	Paul McCartney	Paul McCartney	Tug of War	1982	
"Be What You See (Link)"	Paul McCartney	Paul McCartney	Tug of War	1982	
"Be-Bop-A-Lula" (live) (Gene Vincent cover)	Paul McCartney	Gene Vincent; Tex Davis †	Unplugged (The Official Bootleg)	1991	
"Beautiful Night"	Paul McCartney	Paul McCartney	Flaming Pie	1997	
"Big Boys Bickering"	Paul McCartney	Paul McCartney	B-side to "Hope of Deliverance"	1992	
"Biker Like an Icon"	Paul McCartney	Paul McCartney	Off the Ground	1993	
"Blue Jean Bop" (Gene Vincent cover)	Paul McCartney	Gene Vincent; Hal Levy †	Run Devil Run	1999	
"Blue Moon of Kentucky" (live) (Bill Monroe cover)	Paul McCartney	Bill Monroe †	Unplugged (The Official Bootleg)	1991	
"Blue Sway"	Paul McCartney	Paul McCartney	McCartney II (Archive Collection)	2011	
"Bogey Music"	Paul McCartney	Paul McCartney	McCartney II	1980	
"Bogey Wobble"	Paul McCartney	Paul McCartney	McCartney II (Archive Collection)	2011	
"Bring It On Home to Me" (Sam Cooke cover)	Paul McCartney	Lloyd Price †	CHOBA B CCCP	1988	
"Bridge on the River Suite"	The Country Hams (Note: Released by Paul McCartney and Wings under the pseudonym "The Country Hams".)	Paul McCartney; Linda McCartney	B-side to "Walking in the Park with Eloise"	1974	
"Broomstick"	Paul McCartney	Paul McCartney	B-side to "Young Boy" (CD2)	1997	
"Brown Eyed Handsome Man" (Chuck Berry cover)	Paul McCartney	Chuck Berry †	Run Devil Run	1999	
"Bye Bye Blackbird" (Sam Lanin's Dance Orchestra cover)	Paul McCartney	Ray Henderson; Mort Dixon †	Kisses on the Bottom	2012	
"C'mon Down C'mon Baby"	Paul McCartney	Paul McCartney	Flaming Pie (Archive Collection)	2020	
"C'Mon People"	Paul McCartney	Paul McCartney	Off the Ground	1993	
"Caesar Rock"	Paul McCartney	Paul McCartney	Egypt Station	2018	
"Calico Skies"	Paul McCartney	Paul McCartney	Flaming Pie	1997	
"A Certain Softness"	Paul McCartney	Paul McCartney	Chaos and Creation in the Backyard	2005	
"Check My Machine"	Paul McCartney	Paul McCartney	B-side to "Waterfalls"	1980	
"Chelsea Boots"	Paul McCartney	Paul McCartney	The Boys of Dungeon Lane (special edition)	2026	
"Christian Bop"	Paul McCartney	Paul McCartney	Pipes of Peace (Archive Collection)	2015	
"The Christmas Song (Chestnuts Roasting on an Open Fire)" (Nat King Cole cover)	Paul McCartney	Mel Tormé; Robert Wells †	Holidays Rule	2012	
"City Fox"	Paul McCartney	Paul McCartney	The Boys of Dungeon Lane (special edition)	2026	
"Come and Get It" (Note: McCartney recorded a solo demo of "Come and Get It" during the Beatles' Abbey Road sessions in 1969 as a guide for Badfinger's own recording of the song.) (demo)	Paul McCartney	Paul McCartney	Anthology 3	1996	
"Come Inside"	Paul McCartney	Paul McCartney; Andrew Watt	The Boys of Dungeon Lane	2026	
"Come On to Me"	Paul McCartney	Paul McCartney	Egypt Station	2018	
"Come Together" (Note: Originally recorded by the Beatles.)	The Smokin' Mojo Filters (Note: Paul Weller, Paul McCartney, Noel Gallagher, Steve White, Carleen Anderson and Steve Cradock)	John Lennon; Paul McCartney	Non-album single	1995	
"Comfort of Love"	Paul McCartney	Paul McCartney	B-side to "Fine Line"	2005	
"Coming Up" (Note: A live version, recorded in Glasgow in 1979 by Paul McCartney and Wings, was released as the B-side to "Coming Up" in 1980.)	Paul McCartney	Paul McCartney	McCartney II	1980	
"Confidante"	Paul McCartney	Paul McCartney	Egypt Station	2018	
"Coquette" (Guy Lombardo cover)	Paul McCartney	Johnny Green; Carmen Lombardo; Gus Kahn †	Run Devil Run	1999	
"Corridor Music"	Paul McCartney	Paul McCartney	Give My Regards to Broad Street	1984	
"Cosmically Conscious"	Paul McCartney	Paul McCartney	B-side to "Off the Ground"	1993	
"Crackin' Up" (Bo Diddley cover)	Paul McCartney	Ellas McDaniel †	CHOBA B CCCP	1988	
"Cut Me Some Slack"	Paul McCartney, Dave Grohl, Krist Novoselic, and Pat Smear	Paul McCartney; Dave Grohl; Krist Novoselic; Pat Smear	Sound City: Real to Reel	2013	
"Dance Tonight"	Paul McCartney	Paul McCartney	Memory Almost Full	2007	
"Darkroom"	Paul McCartney	Paul McCartney	McCartney II	1980	
"Days We Left Behind"	Paul McCartney	Paul McCartney	The Boys of Dungeon Lane	2026	
"Dear Boy"	Paul and Linda McCartney	Paul McCartney; Linda McCartney	Ram	1971	
"Deep Deep Feeling"	Paul McCartney	Paul McCartney	McCartney III	2020	
"Deep Down"	Paul McCartney	Paul McCartney	McCartney III	2020	
"Demons Dance"	Paul McCartney	Paul McCartney	New (Collector's edition)	2014	
"Despite Repeated Warnings"	Paul McCartney	Paul McCartney	Egypt Station	2018	
"Distractions"	Paul McCartney	Paul McCartney	Flowers in the Dirt	1989	
"Do It Now"	Paul McCartney	Paul McCartney	Egypt Station	2018	
"Dominoes"	Paul McCartney	Paul McCartney	Egypt Station	2018	
"Don't Be Careless Love"	Paul McCartney	Paul McCartney; Declan MacManus	Flowers in the Dirt	1989	
"Don't Break The Promise"	Paul McCartney	Paul McCartney; Eric Stewart	Oobu Joobu	1995	
"Don't Get Around Much Anymore" (Duke Ellington cover)	Paul McCartney	Duke Ellington; Bob Russell †	CHOBA B CCCP	1988	
"Don't Let the Sun Catch You Crying" (live) (Louis Jordan And His Tympany Five cover)	Paul McCartney	Joe Greene †	Tripping the Live Fantastic	1990	
"Down South"	Paul McCartney	Paul McCartney	The Boys of Dungeon Lane	2026	
"Down to the River"	Paul McCartney	Paul McCartney	B-side to "C'Mon People"	1993	
"Dress Me Up as a Robber"	Paul McCartney	Paul McCartney	Tug of War	1982	
"Drive My Car"	Various Artists	John Lennon; Paul McCartney	Awareness Message Project, Volume 3	1994	
"Driving Rain"	Paul McCartney	Paul McCartney	Driving Rain	2001	
"Early Days"	Paul McCartney	Paul McCartney	New	2013	
"Eat at Home"	Paul and Linda McCartney	Paul McCartney; Linda McCartney	Ram	1971	
"Ebony and Ivory"	Paul McCartney and Stevie Wonder	Paul McCartney	Tug of War	1982	
"Eleanor Rigby" / "Eleanor's Dream"	Paul McCartney	John Lennon; Paul McCartney / Paul McCartney	Give My Regards to Broad Street	1984	
"The End of the End"	Paul McCartney	Paul McCartney	Memory Almost Full	2007	
"English Tea"	Paul McCartney	Paul McCartney	Chaos and Creation in the Backyard	2005	
"Ever Present Past"	Paul McCartney	Paul McCartney	Memory Almost Full	2007	
"Every Night"	Paul McCartney	Paul McCartney	McCartney	1970	
"Everybody Out There"	Paul McCartney	Paul McCartney	New	2013	
"Fabulous" (Charlie Gracie cover)	Paul McCartney	Bernie Lowe; Kal Mann †	B-side to "No Other Baby"	1999	
"Feet in the Clouds"	Paul McCartney	Paul McCartney	Memory Almost Full	2007	
"Figure of Eight"	Paul McCartney	Paul McCartney	Flowers in the Dirt	1989	
"Find My Way"	Paul McCartney	Paul McCartney	McCartney III	2020	
"Fine Line"	Paul McCartney	Paul McCartney	Chaos and Creation in the Backyard	2005	
"First Star of the Night"	Paul McCartney	Paul McCartney	The Boys of Dungeon Lane	2026	
"The First Stone"	Paul McCartney	Paul McCartney; Hamish Stuart	B-side to "This One"	1989	
"Flaming Pie"	Paul McCartney	Paul McCartney	Flaming Pie	1997	
"Flying to My Home"	Paul McCartney	Paul McCartney	B-side to "My Brave Face"	1989	
"Follow Me"	Paul McCartney	Paul McCartney	Chaos and Creation in the Backyard	2005	
"Footprints"	Paul McCartney	Paul McCartney; Eric Stewart	Press to Play	1986	
"For No One"	Paul McCartney	John Lennon; Paul McCartney	Give My Regards to Broad Street	1984	
"FourFiveSeconds"	Rihanna, Kanye West and Paul McCartney	Kanye West; Paul McCartney; Kirby Lauryen; Mike Dean; Ty Dolla Sign; Dave Longstreth; Dallas Austin; Elon Rutberg; Noah Goldstein	Non-album single	2015	
"Frank Sinatra's Party"	Paul McCartney	Paul McCartney	Egypt Station (Explorer's edition)	2019	
"Free Now"	Paul McCartney	Paul McCartney; The Beatles; Super Furry Animals	Liverpool Sound Collage	2000	
"Freedom" (live)	Paul McCartney	Paul McCartney	Driving Rain	2001	
"Friends to Go"	Paul McCartney	Paul McCartney	Chaos and Creation in the Backyard	2005	
"From a Lover to a Friend"	Paul McCartney	Paul McCartney	Driving Rain	2001	
"Front Parlour"	Paul McCartney	Paul McCartney	McCartney II	1980	
"Frozen Jap"	Paul McCartney	Paul McCartney	McCartney II	1980	
"Fuh You"	Paul McCartney	Paul McCartney; Ryan Tedder	Egypt Station	2018	
"Get Enough"	Paul McCartney	Paul McCartney; Ryan Tedder	Non-album single	2019	
"Get It"	Paul McCartney and Carl Perkins	Paul McCartney	Tug of War	1982	
"Get Me Out of Here"	Paul McCartney	Paul McCartney	New (Deluxe edition)	2013	
"Get Out of My Way"	Paul McCartney	Paul McCartney	Off the Ground	1993	
"Get Started"	Paul McCartney	Paul McCartney	Egypt Station (Explorer's edition)	2019	
"Get Yourself Another Fool" (Sam Cooke cover)	Paul McCartney	Haywood Henry; Monroe Tucker †	Kisses on the Bottom	2012	
"The Girl Is Mine"	Michael Jackson and Paul McCartney	Michael Jackson †	Thriller (Michael Jackson album)	1982	
"The Glory of Love" (Benny Goodman cover)	Paul McCartney	Billy Hill †	Kisses on the Bottom	2012	
"Golden Earth Girl"	Paul McCartney	Paul McCartney	Off the Ground	1993	
"Good Day Sunshine"	Paul McCartney	John Lennon; Paul McCartney	Give My Regards to Broad Street	1984	
"Good Rockin' Tonight" (live) (Roy Brown cover)	Paul McCartney	Roy Brown †	Unplugged (The Official Bootleg)	1991	
"Good Sign"	Paul McCartney	Paul McCartney	B-side to "This One"	1989	
"Good Times Coming/Feel the Sun"	Paul McCartney	Paul McCartney	Press to Play	1986	
"Goodbye" (Note: Originally recorded by Mary Hopkin in 1969. McCartney's solo demo was officially released on the Super Deluxe edition of the Beatles' 1969 album Abbey Road in 2019.) (demo)	Paul McCartney	John Lennon; Paul McCartney	Abbey Road (Super Deluxe edition)	2019	
"Goodnight Princess"	Paul McCartney	Paul McCartney	Give My Regards to Broad Street	1984	
"Gratitude"	Paul McCartney	Paul McCartney	Memory Almost Full	2007	
"Great Cock and Seagull Race" (Dixon Van Winkle Mix)	Paul and Linda McCartney	Paul McCartney	Ram (Archive Collection)	2012	
"Great Day"	Paul McCartney	Paul McCartney	Flaming Pie	1997	
"Growing Up, Falling Down"	Paul McCartney	Paul McCartney	B-side to "Fine Line"	2005	
"Hand in Hand"	Paul McCartney	Paul McCartney	Egypt Station	2018	
"Hanglide"	Paul McCartney	Paul McCartney	B-side to "Press"	1986	
"Happy with You"	Paul McCartney	Paul McCartney	Egypt Station	2018	
"Heal the Pain"	George Michael with Paul McCartney	George Michael †	Non-album single	2008	
"Heart of the Country"	Paul and Linda McCartney	Paul McCartney; Linda McCartney	Ram	1971	
"Heather"	Paul McCartney	Paul McCartney	Driving Rain	2001	
"Heaven on a Sunday"	Paul McCartney	Paul McCartney	Flaming Pie	1997	
"Hell to Pay"	Paul McCartney	Paul McCartney	New (Collector's Edition)	2014	
"Here Today"	Paul McCartney	Paul McCartney	Tug of War	1982	
"Here, There and Everywhere"	Paul McCartney	John Lennon; Paul McCartney	Give My Regards to Broad Street	1984	
"Hey Diddle" (Dixon Van Winkle Mix)	Paul and Linda McCartney	Paul McCartney; Linda McCartney	Ram (Archive Collection)	2012	
"Hey Hey"	Paul McCartney	Paul McCartney; Stanley Clarke	Pipes of Peace	1983	
"Hi-Heel Sneakers" (live) (Tommy Tucker cover)	Paul McCartney	Robert Higginbotham †	Unplugged (The Official Bootleg)	1991	
"Home to Us"	Paul McCartney with Ringo Starr	Paul McCartney; Andrew Watt	The Boys of Dungeon Lane	2026	
"Home Tonight"	Paul McCartney	Paul McCartney	Non-album single	2019	
"Home (When Shadows Fall)" (Peter van Steeden cover)	Paul McCartney	Peter van Steeden; Jeff Clarkson; Harry Clarkson †	Kisses on the Bottom	2012	
"Honey Hush" (Big Joe Turner cover)	Paul McCartney	Lou Willie Turner †	Run Devil Run	1999	
"Hope for the Future" (Note: From the 2014 video game Destiny)	Paul McCartney	Paul McCartney	Non-album single	2014	
"Hope of Deliverance"	Paul McCartney	Paul McCartney	Off the Ground	1993	
"Hosanna"	Paul McCartney	Paul McCartney	New	2013	
"Hot as Sun/Glasses"	Paul McCartney	Paul McCartney	McCartney	1970	
"House of Wax"	Paul McCartney	Paul McCartney	Memory Almost Full	2007	
"How Kind of You"	Paul McCartney	Paul McCartney	Chaos and Creation in the Backyard	2005	
"How Many People"	Paul McCartney	Paul McCartney	Flowers in the Dirt	1989	
"However Absurd"	Paul McCartney	Paul McCartney; Eric Stewart	Press to Play	1986	
"Hunt You Down/Naked/C-Link"	Paul McCartney	Paul McCartney	Egypt Station	2018	
"I Can Bet"	Paul McCartney	Paul McCartney	New	2013	
"I Can't Imagine"	Paul McCartney	Paul McCartney	B-side to "C'Mon People"	1993	
"I Do"	Paul McCartney	Paul McCartney	Driving Rain	2001	
"I Don't Know"	Paul McCartney	Paul McCartney	Egypt Station	2018	
"I Don't Want to Confess" (demo)	Paul McCartney	Paul McCartney; Declan MacManus	Flowers in the Dirt (Archive Collection)	2017	
"I Got Stung" (Elvis Presley cover)	Paul McCartney	David Hill; Aaron Schroeder †	Run Devil Run	1999	
"I Lost My Little Girl" (live)	Paul McCartney	Paul McCartney	Unplugged (The Official Bootleg)	1991	
"I Love This House"	Paul McCartney	Paul McCartney	Oobu Joobu	1995	
"I Owe It All to You"	Paul McCartney	Paul McCartney	Off the Ground	1993	
"I Wanna Cry"	Paul McCartney	Paul McCartney	B-side to "This One"	1989	
"(I Want to) Come Home"	Paul McCartney	Paul McCartney	Non-album single	2010	
"I Want to Walk You Home" (Fats Domino cover)	Paul McCartney and Allen Toussaint	Antoine Domino; Dave Bartholomew †	Goin' Home: A Tribute to Fats Domino	2007	
"I Want You to Fly"	Paul McCartney	Paul McCartney	B-side to "Jenny Wren" (CD single)	2005	
"I'll Give You a Ring" (Note: A live studio version recorded by Paul McCartney and Wings in 1974 was released on One Hand Clapping in 2024.)	Paul McCartney	Paul McCartney	B-side to "Take It Away"	1982	
"I'm Gonna Be a Wheel Someday" (Bobby Mitchell & the Toppers cover)	Paul McCartney	Antoine Domino; Dave Bartholomew; Roy Hayes †	CHOBA B CCCP	1988	
"I'm Gonna Sit Right Down and Write Myself a Letter" (Fats Waller cover)	Paul McCartney	Fred E. Ahlert; Joe Young †	Kisses on the Bottom	2012	
"I'm in Love Again" (Fats Domino cover)	Paul McCartney	Antoine Domino; Dave Bartholomew †	B-side to "This One"	1989	
"I'm Partial to Your Abracadabra" (Ian Dury cover)	Paul McCartney and The Blockheads	Ian Dury; Chaz Jankel †	Brand New Boots and Panties: A Tribute to Ian Dury	2001	
"I've Only Got Two Hands" (hidden track)	Paul McCartney	Paul McCartney	Chaos and Creation in the Backyard	2005	
"If You Wanna"	Paul McCartney	Paul McCartney	Flaming Pie	1997	
"In a Hurry"	Paul McCartney	Paul McCartney	Non-album single	2019	
"In Private"	Paul McCartney	Paul McCartney	Memory Almost Full (2-CD edition)	2007	
"In the Blink of an Eye"	Paul McCartney	Paul McCartney	Ethel & Ernest (soundtrack)	2016	
"The Inch Worm" (Danny Kaye cover)	Paul McCartney	Frank Loesser †	Kisses on the Bottom	2012	
"It's Not On" (demo)	Paul McCartney	Paul McCartney	Pipes of Peace (Archive Collection)	2015	
"It's Not True"	Paul McCartney	Paul McCartney	B-side to "Press"	1986	
"It's Now or Never" (Elvis Presley cover)	Paul McCartney	Aaron Schroeder; Wally Gold; Eduardo di Capua †	The Last Temptation of Elvis	1990	
"It's Only a Paper Moon" (Claire Carleton cover)	Paul McCartney	Harold Arlen; E. Y. Harburg; Billy Rose †	Kisses on the Bottom	2012	
"It's So Easy" (Note: An alternate version also appears as a bonus track on the iTunes release (2011).) (The Crickets cover)	Paul McCartney	Buddy Holly; Norman Petty †	Rave On Buddy Holly	2011	
"Jenny Wren"	Paul McCartney	Paul McCartney	Chaos and Creation in the Backyard	2005	
"Junk" (Note: An instrumental version of this song (titled "Singalong Junk") was also included on McCartney.)	Paul McCartney	Paul McCartney	McCartney	1970	
"Just Because" (Nelstone's Hawaiians cover)	Paul McCartney	Bob Shelton; Joe Shelton; Sydney Robin †	CHOBA B CCCP	1988	
"Kansas City" (Little Willie Littlefield cover)	Paul McCartney	Jerry Leiber; Mike Stoller †	CHOBA B CCCP	1988	
"Keep Coming Back to Love"	Paul McCartney	Paul McCartney; Hamish Stuart	B-side to "C'Mon People"	1993	
"Keep Under Cover"	Paul McCartney	Paul McCartney	Pipes of Peace	1983	
"Kicked Around No More"	Paul McCartney	Paul McCartney	B-side to "Hope of Deliverance"	1992	
"The Kiss of Venus"	Paul McCartney	Paul McCartney	McCartney III	2020	
"Kreen-Akrore"	Paul McCartney	Paul McCartney	McCartney	1970	
"Lalula"	Paul McCartney	Paul McCartney	Twin Freaks	2005	
"Lawdy Miss Clawdy" (Lloyd Price cover)	Paul McCartney	Lloyd Price †	CHOBA B CCCP	1988	
"Lavatory Lil"	Paul McCartney	Paul McCartney	McCartney III	2020	
"Let It Be"	Dolly Parton featuring Paul McCartney, Ringo Starr, Peter Frampton and Mick Fleetwood	John Lennon; Paul McCartney	Rockstar	2023	
"Life Can Be Hard"	Paul McCartney	Paul McCartney	The Boys of Dungeon Lane	2026	
"Little Willow"	Paul McCartney	Paul McCartney	Flaming Pie	1997	
"Lonesome Town" (Ricky Nelson cover)	Paul McCartney	Baker Knight †	Run Devil Run	1999	
"Lonely Road"	Paul McCartney	Paul McCartney	Driving Rain	2001	
"The Long and Winding Road" (Note: A re-recorded version was included as a B-side to the "Figure of Eight" CD single (1989).)	Paul McCartney	John Lennon; Paul McCartney	Give My Regards to Broad Street	1984	
"Long-Haired Lady"	Paul and Linda McCartney	Paul McCartney; Linda McCartney	Ram	1971	
"Long Leather Coat"	Paul McCartney	Paul McCartney; Linda McCartney	B-side to "Hope of Deliverance"	1992	
"Long Tailed Winter Bird"	Paul McCartney	Paul McCartney	McCartney III	2020	
"Looking at Her"	Paul McCartney	Paul McCartney	New	2013	
"Looking for Changes"	Paul McCartney	Paul McCartney	Off the Ground	1993	
"Looking for You"	Paul McCartney	Paul McCartney	B-side to "Young Boy" (CD1)	1997	
"Lost Horizon"	Paul McCartney	Paul McCartney	The Boys of Dungeon Lane	2026	
"Love Come Tumbling Down"	Paul McCartney	Paul McCartney	B-side to "Beautiful Night" (CD1)	1997	
"A Love for You"	Paul McCartney	Paul McCartney	Music from the Motion Picture The In-Laws	2003	
"Love Mix"	Paul McCartney	Paul McCartney	Oobu Joobu	1995	
"Loveliest Thing"	Paul McCartney	Paul McCartney	B-side to "Figure of Eight" (CD single)	1989	
"The Lovely Linda"	Paul McCartney	Paul McCartney	McCartney	1970	
"The Lovers That Never Were"	Paul McCartney	Paul McCartney; Declan MacManus	Off the Ground	1993	
"Lucille" (Little Richard cover)	Paul McCartney	Richard Penniman; Albert Collins †	CHOBA B CCCP	1988	
"Made Up"	Paul McCartney	Paul McCartney; The Beatles	Liverpool Sound Collage	2000	
"Magic"	Paul McCartney	Paul McCartney	Driving Rain	2001	
"The Man"	Paul McCartney and Michael Jackson	Paul McCartney; Michael Jackson	Pipes of Peace	1983	
"Man We Was Lonely"	Paul McCartney	Paul McCartney	McCartney	1970	
"Maybe Baby" (Buddy Holly cover)	Paul McCartney	Buddy Holly; Norman Petty †	Maybe Baby (soundtrack)	2000	
"Maybe I'm Amazed"	Paul McCartney	Paul McCartney	McCartney	1970	
"Midnight Special"	Paul McCartney	Traditional †	CHOBA B CCCP	1988	
"Mistress and Maid"	Paul McCartney	Paul McCartney; Declan MacManus	Off the Ground	1993	
"Momma Gets By"	Paul McCartney	Paul McCartney	The Boys of Dungeon Lane	2026	
"Momma Miss America"	Paul McCartney	Paul McCartney	McCartney	1970	
"Monkberry Moon Delight"	Paul and Linda McCartney	Paul McCartney; Linda McCartney	Ram	1971	
"More I Cannot Wish You" (Pat Rooney Sr. cover)	Paul McCartney	Frank Loesser †	Kisses on the Bottom	2012	
"Motor of Love"	Paul McCartney	Paul McCartney	Flowers in the Dirt	1989	
"Mountain Top"	Paul McCartney	Paul McCartney	The Boys of Dungeon Lane	2026	
"Move Over Busker"	Paul McCartney	Paul McCartney; Eric Stewart	Press to Play	1986	
"Movie Magg" (Carl Perkins cover)	Paul McCartney	Carl Perkins †	Run Devil Run	1999	
"Mr. H. Atom/You Know I'll Get You Baby"	Paul McCartney	Paul McCartney	McCartney II (Archive Collection)	2011	
"Mr. Bellamy"	Paul McCartney	Paul McCartney	Memory Almost Full	2007	
"My Brave Face"	Paul McCartney	Paul McCartney; Declan MacManus	Flowers in the Dirt	1989	
"My One and Only Love" (Vic Damone cover)	Paul McCartney	Guy Wood; Robert Mellin †	Kisses on the Bottom (Deluxe edition)	2012	
"My Valentine"	Paul McCartney	Paul McCartney	Kisses on the Bottom	2012	
"My Valentine" (re-recording)	Barbra Streisand and Paul McCartney	Paul McCartney	The Secret of Life: Partners, Volume Two	2025	
"My Very Good Friend the Milkman" (Fats Waller cover)	Paul McCartney	Harold Spina; Johnny Burke †	Kisses on the Bottom	2012	
"Never Know"	Paul McCartney	Paul McCartney; Andrew Watt	The Boys of Dungeon Lane	2026	
"New"	Paul McCartney	Paul McCartney	New	2013	
"No More Lonely Nights" (Note: Two versions of this song were recorded for Give My Regards to Broad Street: the 'ballad' version that was released as a single, and a more dance-oriented 'playout' version.)	Paul McCartney	Paul McCartney	Give My Regards to Broad Street	1984	
"No More Lonely Nights (Ballad Reprise)"	Paul McCartney	Paul McCartney	Give My Regards to Broad Street	1984	
"No Other Baby" (Dickie Bishop and the Sidekicks cover)	Paul McCartney	Dickie Bishop; Bob Watson †	Run Devil Run	1999	
"No Values"	Paul McCartney	Paul McCartney	Give My Regards to Broad Street	1984	
"Nobody Knows"	Paul McCartney	Paul McCartney	McCartney II	1980	
"Nod Your Head"	Paul McCartney	Paul McCartney	Memory Almost Full	2007	
"Nothing for Free"	Paul McCartney	Paul McCartney; Ryan Tedder	Egypt Station (Explorer's edition)	2019	
"Nothing Too Much Just Out of Sight"	Paul McCartney	Paul McCartney	Electric Arguments	2008	
"Not Such a Bad Boy"	Paul McCartney	Paul McCartney	Give My Regards to Broad Street	1984	
"Ode to a Koala Bear"	Paul McCartney	Paul McCartney	B-side to "Say Say Say"	1983	
"Off the Ground"	Paul McCartney	Paul McCartney	Off the Ground	1993	
"Oh Woman, Oh Why"	Paul McCartney	Paul McCartney	B-side to "Another Day"	1971	
"On My Way to Work"	Paul McCartney	Paul McCartney	New	2013	
"On the Way"	Paul McCartney	Paul McCartney	McCartney II	1980	
"Once Upon a Long Ago"	Paul McCartney	Paul McCartney	All the Best!	1987	
"One Night Stand"	Paul McCartney	Paul McCartney	The Boys of Dungeon Lane (special edition)	2026	
"One of These Days"	Paul McCartney	Paul McCartney	McCartney II	1980	
"Only Love Remains"	Paul McCartney	Paul McCartney	Press to Play	1986	
"Only Mama Knows"	Paul McCartney	Paul McCartney	Memory Almost Full	2007	
"Only One"	Kanye West featuring Paul McCartney	Kanye West; Paul McCartney; Kirby Lauryen; Mike Dean; Noah Goldstein	Non-album single	2014	
"Only Our Hearts"	Paul McCartney	Paul McCartney	Kisses on the Bottom	2012	
"Oo You"	Paul McCartney	Paul McCartney	McCartney	1970	
"Opening Station"	Paul McCartney	Paul McCartney	Egypt Station	2018	
"The Other Me"	Paul McCartney	Paul McCartney	Pipes of Peace	1983	
"Out of Sight"	The Bloody Beetroots featuring Paul McCartney & Youth	Paul McCartney	Non-album single	2013	
"Où est le Soleil?"	Paul McCartney	Paul McCartney	B-side to "Figure of Eight" (7" single)	1989	
"Party" (Wanda Jackson cover)	Paul McCartney	Jessie Mae Robinson †	Run Devil Run	1999	
"Party, Party"	Paul McCartney	Paul McCartney; Linda McCartney; Robbie McIntosh; Hamish Stuart; Chris Whitten; Paul "Wix" Wickens	Flowers in the Dirt: Special Package (1990 Japanese tour edition)	1990	
"Peace in the Neighbourhood"	Paul McCartney	Paul McCartney	Off the Ground	1993	
"People Want Peace"	Paul McCartney	Paul McCartney	Egypt Station	2018	
"Peter Blake 2000"	Paul McCartney	Super Furry Animals; The Beatles	Liverpool Sound Collage	2000	
"Pipes of Peace"	Paul McCartney	Paul McCartney	Pipes of Peace	1983	
"Plastic Beetle"	Paul McCartney	Paul McCartney; The Beatles	Liverpool Sound Collage	2000	
"Playboy to a Man" (demo)	Paul McCartney	Paul McCartney; Declan MacManus	Flowers in the Dirt (Archive Collection)	2017	
"The Pound Is Sinking"	Paul McCartney	Paul McCartney	Tug of War	1982	
"Press"	Paul McCartney	Paul McCartney	Press to Play	1986	
"Pretty Boys"	Paul McCartney	Paul McCartney	McCartney III	2020	
"Pretty Little Head"	Paul McCartney	Paul McCartney	Press to Play	1986	
"Promise to You Girl"	Paul McCartney	Paul McCartney	Chaos and Creation in the Backyard	2005	
"Put It There"	Paul McCartney	Paul McCartney	Flowers in the Dirt	1989	
"Queenie Eye"	Paul McCartney	Paul McCartney; Paul Epworth	New	2013	
"Rainclouds"	Paul McCartney	Paul McCartney	B-side to "Ebony and Ivory"	1982	
"Ram On"	Paul and Linda McCartney	Paul McCartney	Ram	1971	
"Ram On (Reprise)"	Paul and Linda McCartney	Paul McCartney	Ram	1971	
"Real Gone Dub Made in Manifest in the Vortex of the Eternal Now"	Paul McCartney	Youth †	Liverpool Sound Collage	2000	
"Really Love You"	Paul McCartney	Paul McCartney; Richard Starkey	Flaming Pie	1997	
"Riding into Jaipur"	Paul McCartney	Paul McCartney	Driving Rain	2001	
"Riding to Vanity Fair"	Paul McCartney	Paul McCartney	Chaos and Creation in the Backyard	2005	
"Rinse the Raindrops"	Paul McCartney	Paul McCartney	Driving Rain	2001	
"Ripples in a Pond"	Paul McCartney	Paul McCartney	The Boys of Dungeon Lane	2026	
"Road"	Paul McCartney	Paul McCartney; Paul Epworth	New	2013	
"Rode All Night"	Paul and Linda McCartney	Paul McCartney	Ram (Archive Collection)	2012	
"A Room with a View" (Noël Coward cover)	Paul McCartney	Noël Coward †	Twentieth-Century Blues: The Songs of Noël Coward	1998	
"Rough Ride"	Paul McCartney	Paul McCartney	Flowers in the Dirt	1989	
"Rudolph the Red-Nosed Reggae"	Paul McCartney	Johnny Marks †	B-side to "Wonderful Christmastime"	1979	
"Run Devil Run"	Paul McCartney	Paul McCartney	Run Devil Run	1999	
"Salesman Saint"	Paul McCartney	Paul McCartney	The Boys of Dungeon Lane	2026	
"Same Love"	Paul McCartney	Paul McCartney	B-side to "Beautiful Night" (CD2)	1997	
"San Francisco Bay Blues" (live) (Jesse Fuller cover)	Paul McCartney	Jesse Fuller †	Unplugged (The Official Bootleg)	1991	
"Save Us"	Paul McCartney	Paul McCartney; Paul Epworth	New	2013	
"Say Say Say"	Paul McCartney and Michael Jackson	Paul McCartney; Michael Jackson	Pipes of Peace	1983	
"Scared" (hidden track)	Paul McCartney	Paul McCartney	New	2013	
"Secret Friend"	Paul McCartney	Paul McCartney	B-side to "Temporary Secretary"	1980	
"See Your Sunshine"	Paul McCartney	Paul McCartney	Memory Almost Full	2007	
"Seize The Day"	Paul McCartney	Paul McCartney	McCartney III	2020	
"Sgt. Pepper's Lonely Hearts Club Band"	Paul McCartney and U2	John Lennon; Paul McCartney	Non-album single	2005	
"Shake a Hand" (Faye Adams cover)	Paul McCartney	Joe Morris †	Run Devil Run	1999	
"Shallow Grave" (demo)	Paul McCartney	Paul McCartney; Declan MacManus	Flowers in the Dirt (Archive Collection)	2017	
"She Is So Beautiful"	Paul McCartney	Paul McCartney	Chaos and Creation in the Backyard (Japanese edition)	2005	
"She Said Yeah" (Larry Williams cover)	Paul McCartney	Larry Williams †	Run Devil Run	1999	
"She's Given Up Talking"	Paul McCartney	Paul McCartney	Driving Rain	2001	
"Silly Love Songs (Reprise)"	Paul McCartney	Paul McCartney	Give My Regards to Broad Street	1984	
"Simple as That"	Paul McCartney	Paul McCartney	The Anti-Heroin Project – It's a Live-in World	1986	
"Singing the Blues" (live) (Marty Robbins cover)	Paul McCartney	Melvin Endsley †	Unplugged (The Official Bootleg)	1991	
"Sixty Second Street"	Paul McCartney	Paul McCartney	Egypt Station (Explorer's edition)	2019	
"Slidin'"	Paul McCartney	Paul McCartney	McCartney III	2020	
"Smile Away"	Paul and Linda McCartney	Paul McCartney	Ram	1971	
"So Bad"	Paul McCartney	Paul McCartney	Pipes of Peace	1983	
"So Like Candy" (demo)	Paul McCartney	Paul McCartney; Declan MacManus	Flowers in the Dirt (Archive Collection)	2017	
"Soggy Noodle"	Paul McCartney	Paul McCartney	B-side to "Off the Ground"	1993	
"Somebody Who Cares"	Paul McCartney	Paul McCartney	Tug of War	1982	
"Somedays"	Paul McCartney	Paul McCartney	Flaming Pie	1997	
"Something That Didn't Happen" (demo)	Paul McCartney	Paul McCartney	Tug of War (Archive Collection)	2015	
"The Song We Were Singing"	Paul McCartney	Paul McCartney	Flaming Pie	1997	
"Souvenir"	Paul McCartney	Paul McCartney	Flaming Pie	1997	
"Spies Like Us"	Paul McCartney	Paul McCartney	Non-album single	1985	
"Spinning on an Axis"	Paul McCartney	Paul McCartney; James McCartney	Driving Rain	2001	
"Squid"	Paul McCartney	Paul McCartney	Oobu Joobu	1995	
"Station II"	Paul McCartney	Paul McCartney	Egypt Station	2018	
"Stop, You Don't Know Where She Came From" (demo)	Paul McCartney	Paul McCartney	Tug of War (Archive Collection)	2015	
"Stranglehold"	Paul McCartney	Paul McCartney; Eric Stewart	Press to Play	1986	
"Struggle"	Paul McCartney	Paul McCartney	New (Japanese edition)	2013	
"Style Style"	Paul McCartney	Paul McCartney	B-side to "Off the Ground"	1993	
"Suicide"	Paul McCartney	Paul McCartney	McCartney (Archive Collection)	2011	
"Summer of '59"	Paul McCartney	Paul McCartney	B-side to "Jenny Wren" (7" single)	2005	
"Summer's Day Song"	Paul McCartney	Paul McCartney	McCartney II	1980	
"Summertime" (Billie Holiday cover)	Paul McCartney	George Gershwin †	CHOBA B CCCP	1988	
"Sunshine Sometime"	Paul and Linda McCartney	Paul McCartney	Ram (Archive Collection)	2012	
"Sweet Sweet Memories"	Paul McCartney	Paul McCartney	B-side to "Off the Ground"	1993	
"Sweetest Little Show"	Paul McCartney	Paul McCartney	Pipes of Peace	1983	
"Take It Away"	Paul McCartney	Paul McCartney	Tug of War	1982	
"Talk More Talk"	Paul McCartney	Paul McCartney	Press to Play	1986	
"Teddy Boy"	Paul McCartney	Paul McCartney	McCartney	1970	
"Temporary Secretary"	Paul McCartney	Paul McCartney	McCartney II	1980	
"That Day Is Done"	Paul McCartney	Paul McCartney; Declan MacManus	Flowers in the Dirt	1989	
"That Was Me"	Paul McCartney	Paul McCartney	Memory Almost Full	2007	
"That Would Be Something"	Paul McCartney	Paul McCartney	McCartney	1970	
"That's All Right Mama" (Note: A re-recorded version appears on the compilation Good Rockin' Tonight: The Legacy of Sun Records (2001).) (Arthur Crudup cover)	Paul McCartney	Arthur Crudup †	CHOBA B CCCP	1988	
"This Loving Game"	Paul McCartney	Paul McCartney	B-side to "Jenny Wren" (CD single)	2005	
"This Never Happened Before"	Paul McCartney	Paul McCartney	Chaos and Creation in the Backyard	2005	
"This One"	Paul McCartney	Paul McCartney	Flowers in the Dirt	1989	
"Through Our Love"	Paul McCartney	Paul McCartney	Pipes of Peace	1983	
"Tiny Bubble"	Paul McCartney	Paul McCartney	Driving Rain	2001	
"Tommy's Coming Home" (demo)	Paul McCartney	Paul McCartney; Declan MacManus	Flowers in the Dirt (Archive Collection)	2017	
"Too Many People"	Paul and Linda McCartney	Paul McCartney	Ram	1971	
"Too Much Rain"	Paul McCartney	Paul McCartney	Chaos and Creation in the Backyard	2005	
"Tough on a Tightrope"	Paul McCartney	Paul McCartney; Eric Stewart	B-side to "Only Love Remains"	1986	
"Tropic Island Hum"	Paul McCartney	Paul McCartney	Non-album single	2004	
"Try Not to Cry"	Paul McCartney	Paul McCartney	Run Devil Run	1999	
"Tug of Peace"	Paul McCartney	Paul McCartney	Pipes of Peace	1983	
"Tug of War"	Paul McCartney	Paul McCartney	Tug of War	1982	
"Turned Out"	Paul McCartney	Paul McCartney	New (Deluxe edition)	2013	
"Twenty Fine Fingers" (demo)	Paul McCartney	Paul McCartney; Declan MacManus	Flowers in the Dirt (Archive Collection)	2017	
"Twenty Flight Rock" (Eddie Cochran cover)	Paul McCartney	Eddie Cochran; Ned Fairchild †	CHOBA B CCCP	1988	
"Twice in a Lifetime"	Paul McCartney	Paul McCartney	Pipes of Peace (The Paul McCartney Collection reissue)	1993	
"Uncle Albert/Admiral Halsey"	Paul and Linda McCartney	Paul McCartney; Linda McCartney	Ram	1971	
"Used to Be Bad"	Paul McCartney	Paul McCartney; Steve Miller	Flaming Pie	1997	
"Valentine Day"	Paul McCartney	Paul McCartney	McCartney	1970	
"Vanilla Sky"	Paul McCartney	Paul McCartney	Music from Vanilla Sky	2001	
"The Very Thought of You" (Ray Noble and His Orchestra cover)	Tony Bennett and Paul McCartney	Ray Noble †	Duets: An American Classic	2006	
"Vintage Clothes"	Paul McCartney	Paul McCartney	Memory Almost Full	2007	
"Walk with You"	Ringo Starr and Paul McCartney	Richard Starkey; Van Dyke Parks †	Y Not (Ringo Starr album)	2010	
"Walking in the Park with Eloise"	The Country Hams	James McCartney †	Non-album single	1974	
"Wanderlust"	Paul McCartney	Paul McCartney	Tug of War	1982	
"Waterfalls"	Paul McCartney	Paul McCartney	McCartney II	1980	
"We All Stand Together" (Note: An alternate version of the song was released as the single's B-side, dubbed the 'Humming Version'.)	Paul McCartney and the Frog Chorus	Paul McCartney	Non-album single	1984	
"We Got Married"	Paul McCartney	Paul McCartney	Flowers in the Dirt	1989	
"We Three (My Echo, My Shadow and Me)" (Frank Sinatra and the Tommy Dorsey Orchestra cover)	Paul McCartney	Sammy Mysels; Dick Robertson; Nelson Cogane †	Kisses on the Bottom	2012	
"We Two"	Paul McCartney	Paul McCartney; Andrew Watt	The Boys of Dungeon Lane	2026	
"What It Is"	Paul McCartney	Paul McCartney	Run Devil Run	1999	
"What's That You're Doing?"	Paul McCartney and Stevie Wonder	Paul McCartney; Stevie Wonder	Tug of War	1982	
"Who Cares"	Paul McCartney	Paul McCartney	Egypt Station	2018	
"Whole Life"	Paul McCartney and Dave Stewart	Paul McCartney; Dave Stewart	One Year On: 46664 (EP)	2005	
"Why So Blue"	Paul McCartney	Paul McCartney	Memory Almost Full (2-CD edition)	2007	
"Winedark Open Sea"	Paul McCartney	Paul McCartney	Off the Ground	1993	
"Winter Bird/When Winter Comes"	Paul McCartney	Paul McCartney	McCartney III	2020	
"Women and Wives"	Paul McCartney	Paul McCartney	McCartney III	2020	
"Women Kind" (demo)	Paul McCartney	Paul McCartney	McCartney (Archive Collection)	2011	
"Wonderful Christmastime"	Paul McCartney	Paul McCartney	Non-album single	1979	
"The World Tonight"	Paul McCartney	Paul McCartney	Flaming Pie	1997	
"Write Away"	Paul McCartney	Paul McCartney; Eric Stewart	B-side to "Pretty Little Head"	1986	
"Yeah"	Various (Note: Eddie Murphy featuring Aaron Hall, Amy Grant, Babyface, Barry White, Bon Jovi, Elton John, Emmanuel Lewis, En Vogue, Garth Brooks, Heavy D, Howard Hewett, Janet Jackson, Johnny Gill, Julio Iglesias, Luther Vandross, MC Hammer, Michael Jackson, Patti LaBelle, Paul McCartney, Richie Sambora, Stevie Wonder and Teddy Pendergrass.)	Eddie Murphy †	Love's Alright	1993	
"Yesterday"	Paul McCartney	John Lennon; Paul McCartney	Give My Regards to Broad Street	1984	
"You Tell Me"	Paul McCartney	Paul McCartney	Memory Almost Full	2007	
"You Want Her Too"	Paul McCartney	Paul McCartney; Declan MacManus	Flowers in the Dirt	1989	
"Young Boy"	Paul McCartney	Paul McCartney	Flaming Pie	1997	
"Your Loving Flame"	Paul McCartney	Paul McCartney	Driving Rain	2001	
"Your Way"	Paul McCartney	Paul McCartney	Driving Rain	2001	

== Wings ==
McCartney fronted the rock band Paul McCartney and Wings, also simply known as Wings, from 1971 to 1981. They recorded over 120 songs during their ten-year career.

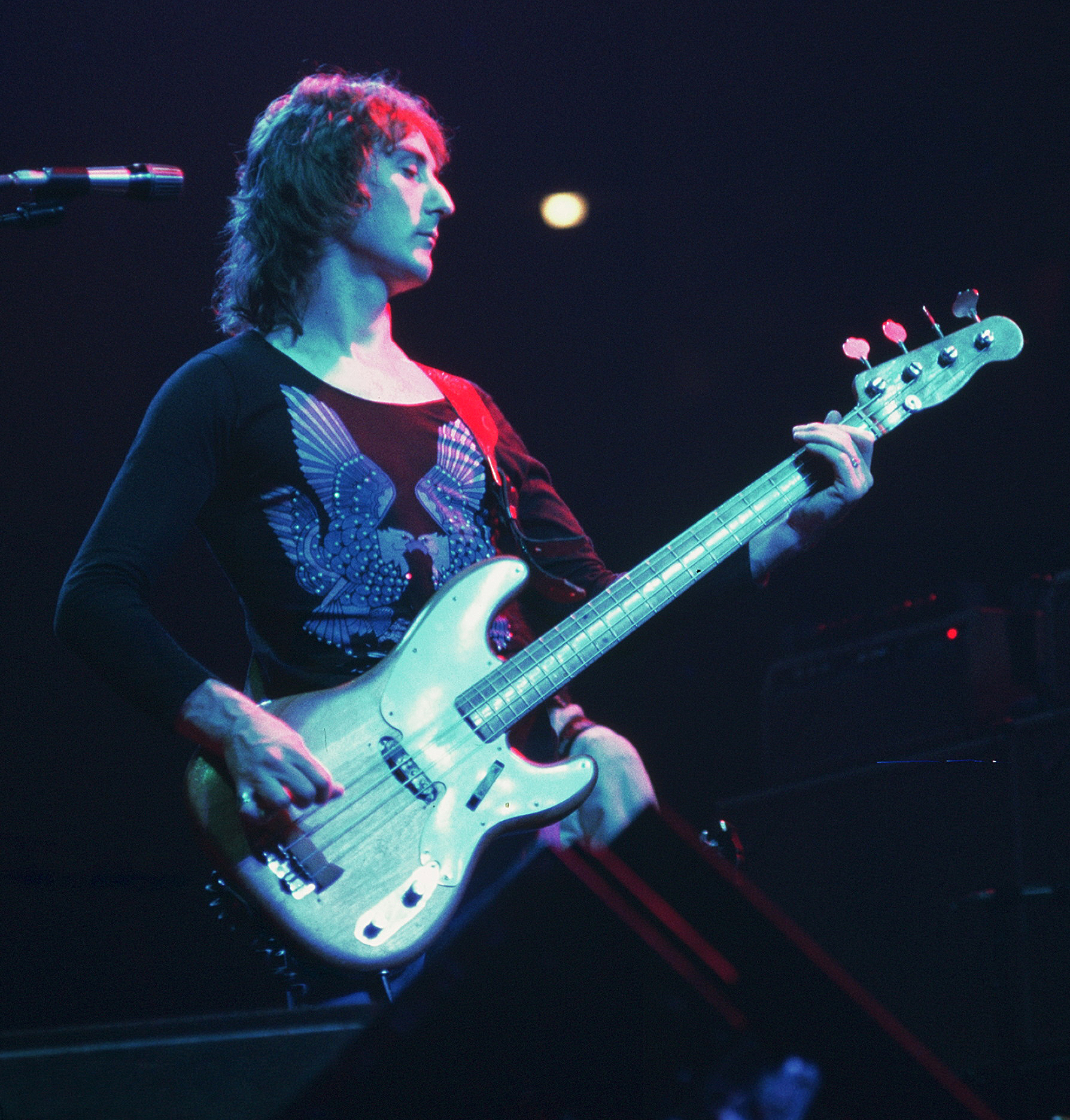
English musician Denny Laine (pictured in 1976) who, with the McCartneys, formed the core trio of Wings' career.

Name of song, artist, writer(s), original release and year of release
Song	Artist	Writer(s)	Original release	Year	Ref.
"1882"	Paul McCartney and Wings	Paul McCartney; Linda McCartney	Red Rose Speedway (Archive Collection)	2018	
"4th of July"	Wings	Paul McCartney; Linda McCartney	Venus and Mars (Archive Collection)	2014	
"African Yeah Yeah"	Wings	Paul McCartney; Linda McCartney	Wild Life (Archive Collection)	2018	
"After the Ball/Million Miles"	Wings	Paul McCartney	Back to the Egg	1979	
"Again and Again and Again"	Wings	Denny Laine †	Back to the Egg	1979	
"All of You"	Paul McCartney and Wings	Paul McCartney	One Hand Clapping	2024	
"Arrow Through Me"	Wings	Paul McCartney	Back to the Egg	1979	
"B-Side to Seaside"	Suzy and the Red Stripes (Note: Released by Paul McCartney and Wings under the pseudonym "Suzy and the Red Stripes".)	Paul McCartney; Linda McCartney	B-side to "Seaside Woman"	1977	
"Baby Face" (Note: Later released on One Hand Clapping (2024)) (from "One Hand Clapping") (Jan Garber cover)	Wings	Harry Akst; Benny Davis †	Venus and Mars (Archive Collection)	2014	
"Baby's Request" (Note: A re-recorded solo version appears on the deluxe edition of Kisses on the Bottom (2012).)	Wings	Paul McCartney	Back to the Egg	1979	
"Backwards Traveller"	Wings	Paul McCartney	London Town	1978	
"Band on the Run"	Paul McCartney and Wings	Paul McCartney; Linda McCartney	Band on the Run	1973	
"Best Friend" (live)	Paul McCartney and Wings	Paul McCartney; Linda McCartney	Red Rose Speedway (Archive Collection)	2018	
"Beware My Love"	Wings	Paul McCartney; Linda McCartney	Wings at the Speed of Sound	1976	
"Big Barn Bed"	Paul McCartney and Wings	Paul McCartney; Linda McCartney	Red Rose Speedway	1973	
"Bip Bop"	Wings	Paul McCartney; Linda McCartney	Wild Life	1971	
"Bip Bop Link"	Wings	Paul McCartney; Linda McCartney	Wild Life (1993 remaster)	1993	
"Blackpool"	Paul McCartney and Wings	Paul McCartney	One Hand Clapping ("The Backyard" Bonus 7-inch)	2024	
"Blue Moon of Kentucky" (Bill Monroe cover)	Paul McCartney and Wings	Bill Monroe †	One Hand Clapping	2024	
"Bluebird"	Paul McCartney and Wings	Paul McCartney; Linda McCartney	Band on the Run	1973	
"The Broadcast"	Wings	Paul McCartney	Back to the Egg	1979	
"C Moon"	Wings	Paul McCartney; Linda McCartney	B-side to "Hi, Hi, Hi"	1972	
"Café on the Left Bank"	Wings	Paul McCartney	London Town	1978	
"Call Me Back Again"	Wings	Paul McCartney; Linda McCartney	Venus and Mars	1975	
"Children Children"	Wings	Paul McCartney; Denny Laine	London Town	1978	
"Cook of the House"	Wings	Paul McCartney; Linda McCartney	Wings at the Speed of Sound	1976	
"Country Dreamer"	Paul McCartney and Wings	Paul McCartney; Linda McCartney	B-side to "Helen Wheels"	1973	
"Crossroads Theme"	Wings	Tony Hatch †	Venus and Mars	1975	
"Cuff Link"	Wings	Paul McCartney	London Town	1978	
"Daytime Nighttime Suffering"	Wings	Paul McCartney	B-side of "Goodnight Tonight"	1979	
"Dear Friend"	Wings	Paul McCartney; Linda McCartney	Wild Life	1971	
"Deliver Your Children"	Wings	Paul McCartney; Denny Laine	London Town	1978	
"Don't Let It Bring You Down"	Wings	Paul McCartney; Denny Laine	London Town	1978	
"Famous Groupies"	Wings	Paul McCartney	London Town	1978	
"Get on the Right Thing"	Paul McCartney and Wings	Paul McCartney; Linda McCartney	Red Rose Speedway	1973	
"Getting Closer"	Wings	Paul McCartney	Back to the Egg	1979	
"Girlfriend"	Wings	Paul McCartney	London Town	1978	
"Girls' School"	Wings	Paul McCartney	B-side to "Mull of Kintyre"	1977	
"Give Ireland Back to the Irish" (Note: An instrumental version of the song, titled "Give Ireland Back to the Irish (Version)", was the B-side to "Give Ireland Back to the Irish".)	Wings	Paul McCartney; Linda McCartney	Non-album single	1972	
"Go Now" (live) (Bessie Banks cover)	Wings	Larry Banks; Milton Bennett †	Wings over America	1976	
"Going to New Orleans (My Carnival)"	Wings	Paul McCartney; Linda McCartney	Venus and Mars (Archive Collection)	2014	
"Goodnight Tonight"	Wings	Paul McCartney	Non-album single	1979	
"Helen Wheels"	Paul McCartney and Wings	Paul McCartney; Linda McCartney	Non-album single	1973	
"Hi, Hi, Hi"	Wings	Paul McCartney; Linda McCartney	Non-album single	1972	
"Hold Me Tight/Lazy Dynamite/Hands of Love/Power Cut"	Paul McCartney and Wings	Paul McCartney; Linda McCartney	Red Rose Speedway	1973	
"I Am Your Singer"	Wings	Paul McCartney; Linda McCartney	Wild Life	1971	
"I Lie Around"	Paul McCartney and Wings	Paul McCartney; Linda McCartney	B-side to "Live and Let Die"	1973	
"I Would Only Smile"	Paul McCartney and Wings	Denny Laine †	Red Rose Speedway (Archive Collection)	2018	
"I'm Carrying"	Wings	Paul McCartney	London Town	1978	
"I'm Gonna Love You Too" (Buddy Holly cover)	Paul McCartney and Wings	Joe B. Mauldin; Niki Sullivan; Norman Petty †	One Hand Clapping ("The Backyard" Bonus 7-inch)	2024	
"I've Had Enough"	Wings	Paul McCartney	London Town	1978	
"Indeed I Do"	Wings	Paul McCartney; Linda McCartney	Wild Life (Archive Collection)	2018	
"Jazz Street"	Paul McCartney and Wings	Paul McCartney; Linda McCartney	Red Rose Speedway (Archive Collection)	2018	
"Jet"	Paul McCartney and Wings	Paul McCartney; Linda McCartney	Band on the Run	1973	
"Junior's Farm"	Wings	Paul McCartney; Linda McCartney	Non-album single	1974	
"Let 'Em In"	Wings	Paul McCartney; Linda McCartney	Wings at the Speed of Sound	1976	
"Let Me Roll It"	Paul McCartney and Wings	Paul McCartney; Linda McCartney	Band on the Run	1973	
"Let's Love"	Wings	Paul McCartney; Linda McCartney	Venus and Mars (Archive Collection)	2014	
"Letting Go"	Wings	Paul McCartney; Linda McCartney	Venus and Mars	1975	
"Listen to What the Man Said"	Wings	Paul McCartney; Linda McCartney	Venus and Mars	1975	
"Little Lamb Dragonfly"	Paul McCartney and Wings	Paul McCartney; Linda McCartney	Red Rose Speedway	1973	
"Little Woman Love"	Wings	Paul McCartney; Linda McCartney	B-side to "Mary Had a Little Lamb"	1972	
"Live and Let Die"	Paul McCartney and Wings	Paul McCartney; Linda McCartney	Non-album single	1973	
"London Town"	Wings	Paul McCartney; Denny Laine	London Town	1978	
"Loup (1st Indian on the Moon)"	Paul McCartney and Wings	Paul McCartney; Linda McCartney	Red Rose Speedway	1973	
"Love in Song"	Wings	Paul McCartney; Linda McCartney	Venus and Mars	1975	
"Love Is Strange" (Mickey & Sylvia cover)	Wings	Mickey Baker; Ethel Smith †	Wild Life	1971	
"Love My Baby" (from "One Hand Clapping")	Wings	Paul McCartney; Linda McCartney	Venus and Mars (Archive Collection)	2014	
"Lunch Box/Odd Sox"	Wings	Paul McCartney	B-side to "Coming Up"	1980	
"Magneto and Titanium Man"	Wings	Paul McCartney; Linda McCartney	Venus and Mars	1975	
"Mama's Little Girl"	Wings	Paul McCartney	B-side to "Put It There"	1990	
"Mamunia"	Paul McCartney and Wings	Paul McCartney; Linda McCartney	Band on the Run	1973	
"Mary Had a Little Lamb"	Wings	Paul McCartney; Linda McCartney	Non-album single	1972	
"Medicine Jar"	Wings	Jimmy McCulloch; Colin Allen †	Venus and Mars	1975	
"The Mess" (live) (Note: A studio recording was finally released on the Red Rose Speedway Archive Collection in 2018.)	Paul McCartney and Wings	Paul McCartney; Linda McCartney	B-side to "My Love"	1973	
"Morse Moose and the Grey Goose"	Wings	Paul McCartney; Denny Laine	London Town	1978	
"Mrs. Vandebilt"	Paul McCartney and Wings	Paul McCartney; Linda McCartney	Band on the Run	1973	
"Mull of Kintyre"	Wings	Paul McCartney; Denny Laine	Non-album single	1977	
"Mumbo"	Wings	Paul McCartney; Linda McCartney	Wild Life	1971	
"Mumbo Link"	Wings	Paul McCartney; Linda McCartney	Wild Life (1993 remaster)	1993	
"Must Do Something About It"	Wings	Paul McCartney; Linda McCartney	Wings at the Speed of Sound	1976	
"My Carnival"	Wings	Paul McCartney	B-side to "Spies Like Us"	1985	
"My Love"	Paul McCartney and Wings	Paul McCartney; Linda McCartney	Red Rose Speedway	1973	
"Name and Address"	Wings	Paul McCartney	London Town	1978	
"Night Out"	Paul McCartney and Wings	Paul McCartney; Linda McCartney	Red Rose Speedway (Archive Collection)	2018	
"Nineteen Hundred and Eighty-Five"	Paul McCartney and Wings	Paul McCartney; Linda McCartney	Band on the Run	1973	
"No Words"	Paul McCartney and Wings	Paul McCartney; Denny Laine	Band on the Run	1973	
"The Note You Never Wrote"	Wings	Paul McCartney; Linda McCartney	Wings at the Speed of Sound	1976	
"Old Siam, Sir"	Wings	Paul McCartney	Back to the Egg	1979	
"One Hand Clapping"	Paul McCartney and Wings	Paul McCartney	One Hand Clapping	2024	
"One More Kiss"	Paul McCartney and Wings	Paul McCartney; Linda McCartney	Red Rose Speedway	1973	
"Peggy Sue" (Buddy Holly cover)	Paul McCartney and Wings	Jerry Allison; Norman Petty †	One Hand Clapping ("The Backyard" Bonus 7-inch)	2024	
"Picasso's Last Words (Drink to Me)"	Paul McCartney and Wings	Paul McCartney; Linda McCartney	Band on the Run	1973	
"Power Cut"	Paul McCartney and Wings	Paul McCartney; Linda McCartney	One Hand Clapping	2024	
"Reception"	Wings	Paul McCartney	Back to the Egg	1979	
"Richard Cory" (live) (Simon & Garfunkel cover)	Wings	Paul Simon †	Wings over America	1976	
"Rock Show"	Wings	Paul McCartney; Linda McCartney	Venus and Mars	1975	
"Rockestra Theme"	Wings	Paul McCartney	Back to the Egg	1979	
"Sally G"	Wings	Paul McCartney; Linda McCartney	B-side to "Junior's Farm"	1974	
"Same Time, Next Year"	Wings	Paul McCartney	B-side to "Put It There"	1990	
"San Ferry Anne"	Wings	Paul McCartney; Linda McCartney	Wings at the Speed of Sound	1976	
"Seaside Woman"	Suzy and the Red Stripes	Linda McCartney †	Non-album single	1977	
"She Got It Good" (home recording)	Wings	Paul McCartney	Wild Life (Archive Collection)	2018	
"She's My Baby"	Wings	Paul McCartney	Wings at the Speed of Sound	1976	
"Silly Love Songs"	Wings	Paul McCartney; Linda McCartney	Wings at the Speed of Sound	1976	
"Single Pigeon"	Paul McCartney and Wings	Paul McCartney; Linda McCartney	Red Rose Speedway	1973	
"So Glad to See You Here"	Wings	Paul McCartney	Back to the Egg	1979	
"Soily" (live)	Wings	Paul McCartney; Linda McCartney	Wings over America	1976	
"Some People Never Know"	Wings	Paul McCartney; Linda McCartney	Wild Life	1971	
"Spin It On"	Wings	Paul McCartney	Back to the Egg	1979	
"Spirits of Ancient Egypt"	Wings	Paul McCartney; Linda McCartney	Venus and Mars	1975	
"Thank You Darling"	Paul McCartney and Wings	Paul McCartney; Linda McCartney	Red Rose Speedway (Archive Collection)	2018	
"Time to Hide"	Wings	Denny Laine †	Wings at the Speed of Sound	1976	
"Tomorrow"	Wings	Paul McCartney; Linda McCartney	Wild Life	1971	
"To You"	Wings	Paul McCartney	Back to the Egg	1979	
"Tragedy" (Thomas Wayne and the DeLons cover)	Paul McCartney and Wings	Gerald Nelson; Fred Burch †	Red Rose Speedway (Archive Collection)	2018	
"Treat Her Gently/Lonely Old People"	Wings	Paul McCartney; Linda McCartney	Venus and Mars	1975	
"Venus and Mars"	Wings	Paul McCartney; Linda McCartney	Venus and Mars	1975	
"Venus and Mars (Reprise)"	Wings	Paul McCartney; Linda McCartney	Venus and Mars	1975	
"Warm and Beautiful"	Wings	Paul McCartney; Linda McCartney	Wings at the Speed of Sound	1976	
"We're Open Tonight"	Wings	Paul McCartney	Back to the Egg	1979	
"When the Night"	Paul McCartney and Wings	Paul McCartney; Linda McCartney	Red Rose Speedway	1973	
"When the Wind Is Blowing"	Wings	Paul McCartney; Linda McCartney	Wild Life (Archive Collection)	2018	
"Wild Life"	Wings	Paul McCartney; Linda McCartney	Wild Life	1971	
"Wino Junko"	Wings	Jimmy McCulloch; Colin Allen †	Wings at the Speed of Sound	1976	
"Winter Rose/Love Awake"	Wings	Paul McCartney	Back to the Egg	1979	
"With a Little Luck"	Wings	Paul McCartney	London Town	1978	
"You Gave Me the Answer"	Wings	Paul McCartney; Linda McCartney	Venus and Mars	1975	
"Zoo Gang"	Paul McCartney and Wings	Paul McCartney; Linda McCartney	B-side to "Band on the Run"	1974	

== The Fireman ==
Under the name the Fireman, McCartney has released three electronica albums with producer Youth since 1993: Strawberries Oceans Ships Forest (1993), Rushes (1998) and Electric Arguments (2008).

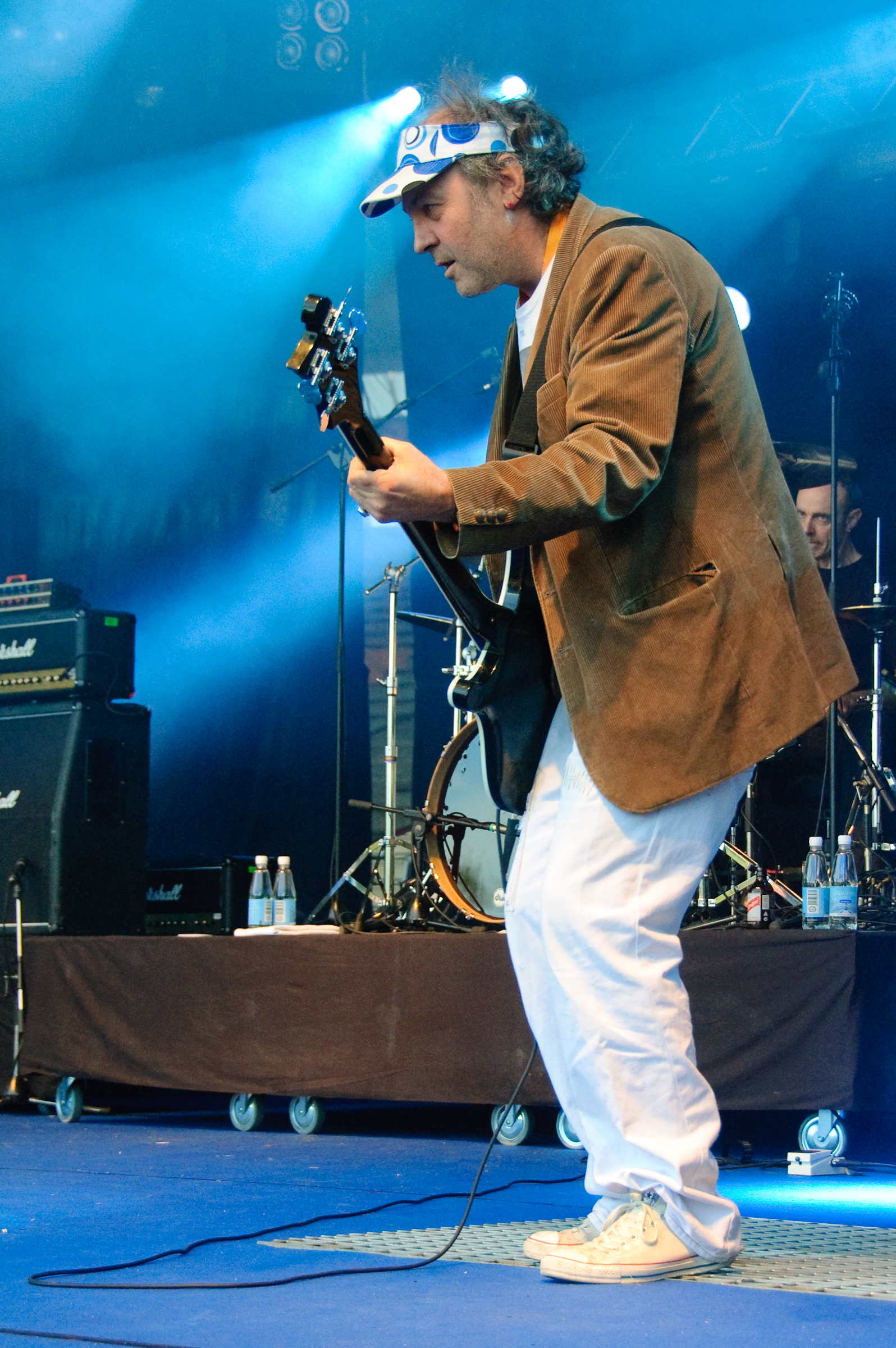
McCartney has recorded music with producer Youth (pictured in 2009) as the Fireman since 1993.

Name of song, artist, writer(s), original release and year of release
Song	Writer(s)	Original release	Year	Ref.
"4 4 4"	Paul McCartney; Youth	Strawberries Oceans Ships Forest	1993	
"7 a.m."	Paul McCartney; Youth	Rushes	1998	
"Appletree Cinnabar Amber"	Paul McCartney; Youth	Rushes	1998	
"Arizona Light"	Paul McCartney; Youth	Strawberries Oceans Ships Forest	1993	
"Auraveda"	Paul McCartney; Youth	Rushes	1998	
"Bison"	Paul McCartney; Youth	Rushes	1998	
"Celtic Stomp"	Paul McCartney; Youth	Strawberries Oceans Ships Forest	1993	
"Dance 'Til We're High"	Paul McCartney	Electric Arguments	2008	
"Don't Stop Running"	Paul McCartney	Electric Arguments	2008	
"Fluid"	Paul McCartney; Youth	Rushes	1998	
"Highway"	Paul McCartney	Electric Arguments	2008	
"Is This Love?"	Paul McCartney	Electric Arguments	2008	
"Lifelong Passion"	Paul McCartney	Electric Arguments	2008	
"Light from Your Lighthouse"	Paul McCartney	Electric Arguments	2008	
"Lovers in a Dream"	Paul McCartney	Electric Arguments	2008	
"Palo Verde"	Paul McCartney; Youth	Rushes	1998	
"Pure Trance"	Paul McCartney; Youth	Strawberries Oceans Ships Forest	1993	
"Road Trip" (hidden track)	Paul McCartney	Electric Arguments	2008	
"Sing the Changes"	Paul McCartney	Electric Arguments	2008	
"Strawberries Oceans Ships Forest"	Paul McCartney; Youth	Strawberries Oceans Ships Forest	1993	
"Sun Is Shining"	Paul McCartney	Electric Arguments	2008	
"Sunrise Mix"	Paul McCartney; Youth	Strawberries Oceans Ships Forest	1993	
"Trans Lunar Rising"	Paul McCartney; Youth	Strawberries Oceans Ships Forest	1993	
"Transcrystaline"	Paul McCartney; Youth	Strawberries Oceans Ships Forest	1993	
"Transpiritual Stomp"	Paul McCartney; Youth	Strawberries Oceans Ships Forest	1993	
"Travelling Light"	Paul McCartney	Electric Arguments	2008	
"Two Magpies"	Paul McCartney	Electric Arguments	2008	
"Universal Here, Everlasting Now"	Paul McCartney	Electric Arguments	2008	
"Watercolour Guitars"	Paul McCartney; Youth	Rushes	1998	
"Watercolour Rush"	Paul McCartney; Youth	Rushes	1998	

== Classical pieces ==
McCartney has recorded five classical albums since 1991, including two with the London Symphony Orchestra. All pieces produced by John Fraser.

Name of song, artist(s), writer, original release and year of release
Song	Artist(s)	Writer	Release	Year	Ref.
"Calico Skies" (Original release: Flaming Pie (1997))	The Loma Mar Quartet	Paul McCartney	Working Classical	1999	
"Golden Earth Girl" (Original release: Off the Ground (1993))	The Loma Mar Quartet	Paul McCartney	Working Classical	1999	
"Hall of Dance"	London Symphony Orchestra	Paul McCartney	Ocean's Kingdom	2011	
"Haymakers"	The Loma Mar Quartet	Paul McCartney	Working Classical	1999	
"I. Spiritus"	Paul McCartney	Paul McCartney	Ecce Cor Meum	2006	
"II. Gratia"	Paul McCartney	Paul McCartney	Ecce Cor Meum	2006	
"III. Musica"	Paul McCartney	Paul McCartney	Ecce Cor Meum	2006	
"IV. Ecce Coe Meum"	Paul McCartney	Paul McCartney	Ecce Cor Meum	2006	
"Imprisonment"	London Symphony Orchestra	Paul McCartney	Ocean's Kingdom	2011	
"Interlude (Lament)"	Paul McCartney	Paul McCartney	Ecce Cor Meum	2006	
"Junk" (Original release: McCartney (1970))	The Loma Mar Quartet	Paul McCartney	Working Classical	1999	
A Leaf (Note: Consists of seven different pieces: ""Andante Semplice", "Poco Piu Mosso", "Allegro Ritmico", "Andante", "Allegro Ma Non Tanto", "Moderato" and "Andante Semplice (II)".)	London Symphony Orchestra	Paul McCartney	Working Classical	1995	
"The Lovely Linda" (Original release: McCartney (1970))	The Loma Mar Quartet	Paul McCartney	Working Classical	1999	
"Maybe I'm Amazed" (Original release: McCartney (1970))	The Loma Mar Quartet	Paul McCartney	Working Classical	1999	
"Midwife"	The Loma Mar Quartet	Paul McCartney	Working Classical	1999	
"Moonrise"	London Symphony Orchestra	Paul McCartney	Ocean's Kingdom	2011	
"Movement I – After Heavy Light Years" (Note: Consists of three pieces: "Fire/Rain" Allegro energico, "Cell Growth" Semplice and "Human' Theme" Maestoso.)	Paul McCartney and London Symphony Orchestra	Paul McCartney	Standing Stone	1997	
"Movement II – He Awoke Startled" (Note: Consists of five pieces: "Meditation" Contemplativo, "Crystal Ship" Con moto scherzando, "Sea Voyage" Pulsating, with cool jazz feel, "Lost at Sea" Sognando and "Release" Allegro con spirito.)	Paul McCartney and London Symphony Orchestra	Paul McCartney	Standing Stone	1997	
"Movement III – Subtle Colours Merged With Soft Contours" (Note: Consists of six pieces: "Safe Haven/Standing Stone" Pastorale con moto, "Peaceful Moment" Andante tranquillo, "Messenger" Energico, "Lament" Lamentoso, "Trance" Misterioso and "Eclipse" Eroico.)	Paul McCartney and London Symphony Orchestra	Paul McCartney	Standing Stone	1997	
"Movement IV – Strings Pluck, Horns Blow, Drums Beat" (Note: Consists of five pieces: "Glory Tales" Trionfale, "Fugal Celebration" L'istesso tempo. Fresco, "Rustic Dance" Rustico, "Love Duet" Andante intimo and "Celebration" Andante.)	Paul McCartney and London Symphony Orchestra	Paul McCartney	Standing Stone	1997	
"My Love" (Original release: Red Rose Speedway (1973))	The Loma Mar Quartet	Paul McCartney	Working Classical	1999	
"Nova"	Paul McCartney	Paul McCartney	A Garland for Linda (tribute album)	2000	
"Ocean's Kingdom"	London Symphony Orchestra	Paul McCartney	Ocean's Kingdom	2011	
"She's My Baby" (Original release: Wings at the Speed of Sound (1976))	The Loma Mar Quartet	Paul McCartney	Working Classical	1999	
"Somedays" (Original release: Flaming Pie (1997))	The Loma Mar Quartet	Paul McCartney	Working Classical	1999	
"Spiral"	London Symphony Orchestra	Paul McCartney	Working Classical	1999	
"Tuesday"	London Symphony Orchestra	Paul McCartney	Working Classical	1999	
"Warm and Beautiful" (Original release: Wings at the Speed of Sound (1976))	The Loma Mar Quartet	Paul McCartney	Working Classical	1999	

== See also ==
- List of songs recorded by the Beatles

== Bibliography ==
- Carlin, Peter Ames (2009). Paul McCartney: A Life. New York: Simon & Schuster. ISBN 978-1-416562-09-2.
- Harry, Bill (2002). The Paul McCartney Encyclopedia. Virgin. ISBN 978-0-7535-0716-2.
- Ingham, Chris (2006). The Rough Guide to the Beatles. Rough Guides. ISBN 1-84353-720-6.
- Lewisohn, Mark (1988). The Complete Beatles Recording Sessions. New York: Metro Books. ISBN 978-1-4351-4933-5.
- Sounes, Howard (2010). Fab: An Intimate Life of Paul McCartney. Da Capo Press. ISBN 978-0-306-81783-0.
