= Liverpool Sound Collage =

Studio album by Paul McCartney
- Released: 21 August 2000
- Recorded: 1999–2000
- Genres: Sound collage; musique concrète; noise; spoken word; avant-garde
- Length: 58:24
- Labels: Hydra (UK); Capitol (US)
- Producer: Paul McCartney

Paul McCartney chronology
Working Classical (1999)	Liverpool Sound Collage (2000)	Wingspan: Hits and History (2001)

the Fireman chronology
Rushes (1998)	Liverpool Sound Collage (2000)	Electric Arguments (2008)

Professional ratings
Review scores
Source	Rating
AllMusic	3/5 stars
Encyclopedia of Popular Music	3/5 stars
NME	2.5/5 stars
Ultimate-Guitar.com	2.7/10

Liverpool Sound Collage is an album by Paul McCartney released in 2000. The album is also credited to the Beatles, Super Furry Animals and Youth; but because McCartney was so heavily involved in its creation, in addition to his production credit, Liverpool Sound Collage is filed under his name.

Asked by artist Peter Blake to create something musical and with a Liverpool spirit to it, in order to complement his concurrent artwork exhibition, McCartney ended up hearkening back to session chatter by the Beatles (hence their "involvement") and using snippets of his 1991 classical piece Paul McCartney's Liverpool Oratorio to create the tracks for the album. On the track "Made Up" he also can be heard walking the streets and asking various pedestrians to give their impressions of Liverpool and the Beatles. Besides using Musique concrète sounds, the album also incorporates chopped-up beats and digital manipulations of assorted archival sound clips.

Liverpool Sound Collage was nominated for the 2001 Grammy Award for Best Alternative Music Album.

In return for being permitted to remix some Beatles music for the album, McCartney was asked to perform on the Super Furry Animals' next album, Rings Around the World, on which he is credited as providing "celery and carrot" on "Receptacle for the Respectable".

In 2017, it was revealed that the chorus of "Free Now" was taken from Take 9 of the Beatles song "Sgt. Pepper's Lonely Hearts Club Band", recorded in early 1967 and published on the Sgt. Pepper's Lonely Hearts Club Band: 50th Anniversary Edition.

In 2026, it was revealed that George Harrison's phrases such as "the bit that John finally got, just after that" and "do what you want to do" on "Free Now" were taken from the vocal overdubs sessions of the Beatles song "Think for Yourself", recorded in late 1965 and published on the Rubber Soul: Special Edition.

== Track listing ==
1. "Plastic Beetle" – 8:23
  - Paul McCartney, The Beatles
2. "Peter Blake 2000" – 16:54
  - Super Furry Animals, The Beatles
3. "Real Gone Dub Made in Manifest in the Vortex of the Eternal Now" – 16:37
  - Youth
4. "Made Up" – 12:58
  - Paul McCartney, The Beatles
5. "Free Now" – 3:29
  - Paul McCartney, The Beatles, Super Furry Animals
