= Ocean's Kingdom =

Studio album by Paul McCartney
- Released: 3 October 2011
- Recorded: June 2011
- Genre: Contemporary classical
- Length: 56:33
- Labels: Decca (UK), Hear Music/Telarc (US)
- Producer: John Fraser

Paul McCartney chronology
Good Evening New York City (2009)	Ocean's Kingdom (2011)	Kisses on the Bottom (2012)

Professional ratings
Aggregate scores
Source	Rating
Metacritic	60/100
Review scores
Source	Rating
AllMusic	2.5/5 stars
BBC Music	(unfavourable)
Consequence of Sound	C+
The Guardian	2/5 stars
The Independent	3/5 stars
MusicOMH	3/5 stars
The New York Times	(unfavourable)
PopMatters	6/10 stars
Record Collector	3/5 stars
Uncut	3/5 stars

Ocean's Kingdom is the fifth classical album by Paul McCartney. It is the score of the ballet of the same name, commissioned by the New York City Ballet. It was performed by the London Classical Orchestra and conducted by John Wilson. The album was released on CD and vinyl, on 3 October 2011 by Decca (UK) and October 4 (US) by Hear Music/Telarc (US). In the United States, it peaked at number 144 on the Billboard 200 chart. The album has a score of 60 out of 100 at Metacritic, based on eight reviews, signifying a "mixed or average" critical response.

The ballet tells of a love story based in two fantastic worlds – the "pure" ocean kingdom, and the Earth kingdom with its "sort of baddies" who threaten the underwater way of life. According to McCartney, love happens when earth meets water, and "you'll have to see whether the couple make it". His score for the ballet consists of four orchestral movements.

== Track listing ==
All pieces by Paul McCartney.

Movement 1

1. "Ocean's Kingdom" – 14:07

Movement 2

2. "Hall of Dance" – 16:19

Movement 3

3. "Imprisonment" – 13:36

Movement 4

4. "Moonrise" – 12:31

=== Bonus Track edition ===
Available through iTunes and as a digital download with the code card included in the CD and LP, it contains the studio & live versions of the four movements. The live tracks are from the world première on 21 September 2011, as performed by the New York City Ballet Orchestra & conducted by Fayçal Karoui.

Movement 1

1. "Ocean's Kingdom" (Live) – 12:15

Movement 2

2. "Hall of Dance" (Live) – 14:27

Movement 3

3. "Imprisonment" (Live) – 10:14

Movement 4

4. "Moonrise" (Live) – 10:31
