= The Fireman (band) =

English experimental music duo

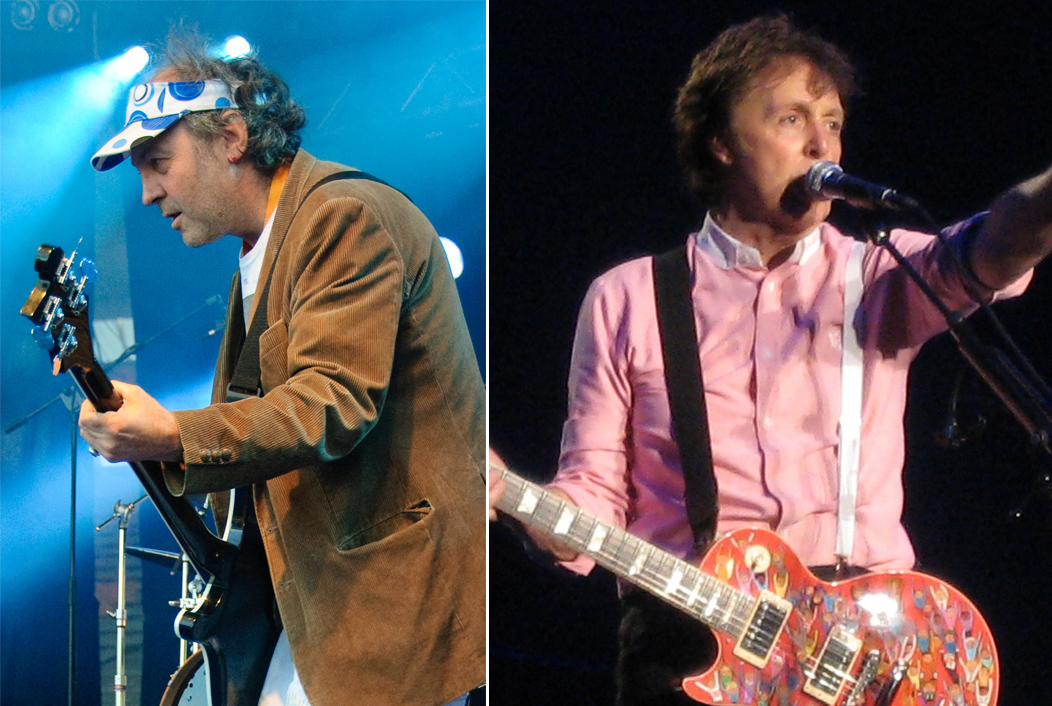
- Youth and Paul McCartney

Background information
- Origin: England
- Genres: IDM, ambient, industrial, neo-psychedelia, experimental rock
- Years active: 1992–present
- Labels: Hydra/EMI Records (UK); Capitol/EMI Records (US); One Little Indian (UK); ATO Records/MPL (US); MapleMusic Recordings (Canada)
- Members: Paul McCartney; Youth

The Fireman is an English experimental music duo of Paul McCartney and Youth formed in 1993. Their music catalogue ranges from rock to electronica, evolving over more than two decades and three albums. Although officially anonymous until 2008 with the release of the album Electric Arguments, the group members' names had been known to the public since soon after the release of their first album.

In 1993, the Fireman released its first album, Strawberries Oceans Ships Forest, and followed that with Rushes in 1998. In 2000, Youth also took part in McCartney's similarly styled Liverpool Sound Collage. Their most recent album is Electric Arguments (2008).

In June 2008, McCartney's official website announced that a track called "Lifelong Passion (Sail Away)", from the album Electric Arguments, would be issued as a limited-edition download to fans who donated to the charity Adopt-A-Minefield. The album was released on the label One Little Independent on 24 November 2008. The new album features more traditional songs, in which there are vocals (the first time on any of their albums). The majority of the album's vocals come from McCartney. In February 2009, SiriusXM launched Fireman Radio, a limited-run channel dedicated to the music of the group.

== History ==
=== Formation ===
In early 1993, Paul McCartney had finished recording the tracks for his ninth solo studio album Off the Ground and was in the process of mixing the songs. McCartney wanted some input and help from another producer, so his friend Allen Crowder recommended Youth to come into the studio. Soon after, McCartney phoned Youth about the prospects of him mixing the album, and subsequently invited him to his private Hog Hill studio in Sussex. Youth accepted the offer and the two began the process of remixing the song for the album which was eventually released in February 1993. While working together professionally for the album, McCartney and Youth also became good friends. They both felt that their musical relationship could be expanded upon further than merely focusing on McCartney's solo work, so the two began compiling material which would ultimately become Strawberries Oceans Ships Forest.

That's the whole point about The Fireman – it's very free. And also it's an approach I'm interested in. The whole idea behind 'Sgt. Pepper's...' was to create a band, and we could pretend that we were that band and not the Beatles, so we made that record with that in mind...But it's very free – it's a very joyful way to record. Sometimes it can be pretty scary but that's OK. And it's very quick. But I enjoy the process because it's exhilarating.

— Paul McCartney

=== Strawberries Oceans Ships Forest ===
The collaboration of Paul McCartney and Youth began as a mere hobby between the two. McCartney proposed to Youth that he go through the multi tracks of the recently completed Off the Ground album and sample the material in order to create some songs. Youth began making the tracks with intentions of using samples from the album, yet much of the final product had either used previous work or newly recorded material by McCartney. Youth worked on these songs' mixes for a few days while at McCartney's Sussex studio and eventually presented his work to McCartney and his wife Linda McCartney, who both stayed up all night to watch him work. As Youth recalls, McCartney told him, "We love these mixes so much I wanna put them all out as an album." By that point, the duo decided to officially release the album. The final product consisted of nine songs that all centered around a common musical theme and techno dance beat yet had slight underlying variations added, much like different mixes on a 12-inch single. The album, which featured only a pure red background on the cover, was the first release under the Fireman name and lacked any marks of either McCartney's or Youth's names but refers to MPL Communications. The album was released in November 1993. Shortly before the release, the true identities of the band were leaked to the press and most who bought the album were fully aware that the Fireman was a pseudonym for Paul McCartney and Youth. Although this broke the guise that McCartney wanted to have, it allowed the album to gain more attention in the music scene.

=== Rushes ===
Recording for their second studio album Rushes began in February 1998. Unlike their previous work, Rushes was not reliant on McCartney's previously released songs to create the tracks for the album. It was released in September 1998 with positive reviews, most of which had the consensus that it improved upon their first album.

=== Electric Arguments ===
Nearly ten years passed before McCartney and Youth began creating material for their third studio album, Electric Arguments. The duo again recorded songs at McCartney's Hog Hill studio, yet did so one session at a time between 2007 and 2008. This was their first album to feature any vocals because both Youth and McCartney felt that their material needed a change; thus the genre of the band evolved from its more electronic roots to an experimental rock influence. Like their previous two albums however, McCartney played all of the instruments while Youth co-produced the tracks.The duo borrowed the title Electric Arguments from the poem "Kansas City to St. Louis" by Allen Ginsberg. In Wired magazine, McCartney said he had "been looking at the beauty of word combinations rather than their meaning".

We had a ball making this album, and it was a great departure because it seemed more like improv theatre. In the improv spirit, there are William Burroughs-type cut-ups in the lyrics. I came to 'Sing the Changes', as well as all the other songs in the album, with absolutely no concept of what the melody or lyrics would be about. So it was like writing on the spot, which I think lent an electricity to the whole sound.

— Paul McCartney

This was the Fireman's first album to be released on the independent label One Little Independent, switching from McCartney's usual EMI. This was due to McCartney's belief that major labels were not adapting to the times, referring to the newfound popularity of online music at the time such as iTunes.

== Musical style/development ==
The Fireman began as an ambient techno group but over three albums it has morphed into an experimental rock band more reminiscent of McCartney's solo work. The duo have said that their work has been highly influenced by songs such as "Tomorrow Never Knows", a Lennon-McCartney track from 1966's Revolver. For the most part, the recording process for the band is very casual and spontaneous. Youth described this informal way of making songs in the online magazine Sound on Sound:

I'd bring down all these poetry books or play him some really old traditional folk music and say, 'Listen to this story and see if you can write some words.' Or I'd go, 'Take these poems and just pick out five words on that page and write a line out of those. (Laughs) And you've got 10 minutes!' And he did it!

Although this way of recording seemed relaxed, McCartney found the process thrilling – even frightening at times – compared to the orderly style to which he is accustomed in the studio. "If I hadn't done The Fireman," he said, "I think I would wish I'd done that, because it freshened ideas up for me."

== Discography ==
=== Albums ===
- Strawberries Oceans Ships Forest (1993)
- Rushes (1998)
- Electric Arguments (2008)

=== Singles ===
- "Transpiritual Stomp/Arizona Light Mix" (1993)
- "Rushes" (1998)
  - "Fluid"
  - "Appletree Cinnabar Amber"
  - "Bison (Long One)"
- Fluid (Nitin Sawhney Remixes) (1999)
  - "Fluid (Out of Body and Mind Mix)"
  - "Fluid (Out of Body Mix)"
  - "Fluid (Out of Body with Sitar Mix)"
  - "Bison"
- "Sing the Changes" (2008)
- "Dance Til We're High" (2008)
- "Nothing Too Much Just Out of Sight (Radio Edit)" (2009)

== See also ==
- List of ambient music artists
