= Strawberries Oceans Ships Forest =

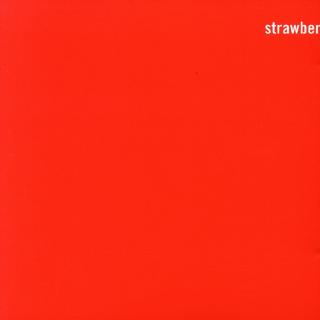

Studio album by the Fireman
- Released: 15 November 1993
- Recorded: 7–10 October 1992
- Studios: Hogg Hill Mill (Icklesham, UK)
- Genres: Ambient techno; trance; EDM
- Length: 76:40
- Labels: Parlophone/EMI (UK); Capitol/EMI (US)
- Producer: The Fireman

The Fireman chronology
Strawberries Oceans Ships Forest (1993)	Rushes (1998)

Paul McCartney chronology
Paul Is Live (1993)	Strawberries Oceans Ships Forest (1993)	Flaming Pie (1997)

Singles from Strawberries Oceans Ships Forest
- 1. "Transpiritual Stomp" Released: 1993

Strawberries Oceans Ships Forest is the debut studio album by the Fireman, released in November 1993. The album consists of samples of McCartney's material, mostly from the sessions of his Off the Ground album, but also of "Reception" and "The Broadcast" from Wings' Back to the Egg album; remixed and with new music added. Neither McCartney nor Youth are credited on the album; rumours of McCartney's involvement were eventually confirmed by EMI.

== Background ==
The project began when McCartney asked Youth to remix several tracks from McCartney's Off the Ground album for use on possible 12" singles. McCartney stated,

"The brief from me was that he should only use stuff from our recordings, because dance mixes often feature a kick-drum sample or a James Brown snare sound and, as a consequence, the record ends up sounding a bit like someone else's so I told Youth that I'd prefer any sound he might select to come off our recordings, mainly Off the Ground."

== Recording ==
Regarding the project, Youth has stated,

"I didn't think it appropriate to remix any of the Off the Ground tracks the way I'd been briefed. I thought it would be better to do a more conceptual thing - that is, rather than remix a track I thought we should deconstruct the album into samples and then construct a new mix from those. And Paul liked the idea. He was into it, so I went for it."

Eventually, McCartney decided to join Youth in the studio to create new music to add to the tapestry along with the existing samples, and the project became a more collaborative effort. Although originally conceived as a series of 12" remixes, McCartney became so enamoured with the results of the sessions that the project became this full-length album.

== Release and reception ==
Professional ratings
Review scores
Source	Rating
AllMusic	3/5 stars
Robert Christgau	(1-star Honorable Mention)
The Encyclopedia of Popular Music	3/5 stars
Entertainment Weekly	C+
Q	3/5 stars
Rolling Stone	4/5 stars

In a Melody Maker review, Michael Bonner wrote,

"Paul McCartney has discovered dance music – and the results are as staggeringly brilliant as those that came from John Lydon's similar road-to-Damascus-like conversion last year. Truly, we live in an age of miracles. Eschewing the easy option of making a remix album, McCartney and his collaborator, Youth, have chosen to follow the likes of Brian Eno down a more experimental and cerebral path. They take a melody and, with dexterous genre-hopping through ambient, trance and house, evolve a number of breathtaking variations. Like snowflakes, each song seems identical to the last, until closer inspection reveals that it has its own unique shape."

Strawberries Oceans Ships Forest was released in the UK on 15 November 1993, and in the US on 14 February 1994. The album, released on Parlophone in the UK, (Note: UK Parlophone PCSD 145) (Note: UK Parlophone CDPCSD 145) and Capitol in the US. "Transpiritual Stomp" was released as a 12" single, with "Arizona Light Mix" as the B-side.

== Track listing ==
All songs written by the Fireman.

Strawberries, Oceans, Ships, Forest (S.O.S.F.) by The Fireman
No.	Title	Length
1.	"Transpiritual Stomp"	9:01
2.	"Trans Lunar Rising"	9:09
3.	"Transcrystaline"	8:39
4.	"Pure Trance"	8:40
5.	"Arizona Light"	8:39
6.	"Celtic Stomp"	8:34
7.	"Strawberries Oceans Ships Forest"	8:07
8.	"4 4 4"	7:35
9.	"Sunrise Mix"	8:16
Total length:		77:00

== Personnel ==
- Paul McCartney – banjo, double-bass, flute
- Youth – bass
