= Electric Arguments =

Studio album by the Fireman
- Released: 24 November 2008
- Recorded: December 2007 – June 2008
- Studios: Hogg Hill Mill (Icklesham, UK)
- Genres: Experimental pop; alternative rock; neo-psychedelia; new-age; ambient
- Length: 63:05
- Labels: One Little Indian (UK); ATO (US)
- Producer: The Fireman

The Fireman chronology
Rushes (1998)	Electric Arguments (2008)

Paul McCartney chronology
Amoeba's Secret (2007)	Electric Arguments (2008)	Good Evening New York City (2009)

Electric Arguments is the third studio album by the Fireman, released on 24 November 2008 on the duo's website. It was announced on 29 September 2008 on Paul McCartney's website, making it the first Fireman release to be publicly acknowledged by McCartney. The album cover features the names of both contributors in contrast to the anonymity of their earlier works, and it is also the first album by the duo to feature regular lead vocals.

== Background and recording ==
Each of the songs was recorded in one day, the album itself being completed in only 13 days, spread over the course of nearly a year. The album includes the hidden track "Road Trip", at the end of "Don't Stop Running". Remixes of "Lifelong Passion" were made, titled "Sawain Ambient Acapella" and "Sawain Instrumental Dub". Instrumental mixes of "Sun Is Shining" and "Traveling Light" were made, titled "Equinox Instrumental" and "Travelling Light Instrumental", respectively. Instrumental dub mixes were made of "Sing the Changes" and "Don't Stop Running", titled "Morning Mist Instrumental Dub" and "Wickerman Ambient Dub", respectively.

The duo borrowed the title "Electric Arguments" from the poem "Kansas City to St. Louis" by Allen Ginsberg. McCartney stated this was because "he's been looking at the beauty of word combinations rather than their meaning." He also said of his collaboration with Youth:

We had a ball making this album, and it was a great departure because it seemed more like improv theatre. In the improv spirit, there are William Burroughs-type cut-ups in the lyrics. I came to "Sing the Changes," as well as all the other songs in the album, with absolutely no concept of what the melody or lyrics would be about. So it was like writing on the spot, which I think lent an electricity to the whole sound.

== Release ==
An edited version of "Nothing Too Much Out of Sight" premiered on BBC Radio 1 on 29 September 2008. "Lifelong Passion" was available briefly as a charity download for Adopt-A-Minefield.

Electric Arguments debuted at number 79 on the UK Album Charts, marking the first appearance for the Fireman in the British charts. The duo also made their inaugural appearance on the Billboard 200, peaking at number 67.

== Critical reception ==
Professional ratings
Aggregate scores
Source	Rating
Metacritic	74/100
Review scores
Source	Rating
AllMusic	4.5/5 stars
The A.V. Club	B−
The Guardian	1/5 stars
Los Angeles Times	3/4 stars
Mojo	3/5 stars
The Observer	4/5 stars
Paste	8.6/10
Pitchfork	7.3/10
Rolling Stone	4/5 stars
Spin	3.5/5 stars
Uncut	4/5 stars

According to reviews aggregator Metacritic, the album rated 74 out of 100, indicating a "generally favourable" critical reception, based on 23 reviews. AllMusic's Stephen Thomas Erlewine wrote that "There are more twists and turns, more textures, than on any other McCartney album in the last 20 years …" Will Hermes of Rolling Stone called the album "the ex-Beatle's headiest music in years". In a four-star review for The Times, Pete Paphides wrote that "Electric Arguments is delivered with a disregard for production values or playlist potential that would make, say, Keane or the Kooks blush at their own conservatism".

Less impressed, Alex Macpherson of The Guardian described the album as "heavily laboured hackwork". He said of the track "Nothing Too Much Just Out of Sight": "This has been pegged by the more excitable tabloids as a hate rant against [McCartney's ex-wife] Heather Mills, but if this is what she has had to put up with, it may just have done the unthinkable and engendered sympathy for the poor woman." Ron Hart of PopMatters rated Electric Arguments 7 out of 10 and considered that the project's appeal "depends on where you stand as a Macca fan", following the singer's run of strong studio albums since Driving Rain in 2001. After opining that these nominal McCartney albums were "much stronger releases on almost every level", Hart concluded: "Electric Arguments does harbor its own unique charm that will certainly appeal to longtime fans [more] than Macca's previous pair of Fireman jaunts." Robert Christgau of MSN Music dismissed the album as a "dud."

== Track listing ==
All songs written by Paul McCartney.

1. "Nothing Too Much Just Out of Sight" – 4:55
2. "Two Magpies" – 2:12
3. "Sing the Changes" – 3:44
4. "Travelling Light" – 5:06
5. "Highway" – 4:17
6. "Light from Your Lighthouse" – 2:31
7. "Sun Is Shining" – 5:12
8. "Dance 'Til We're High" – 3:37
9. "Lifelong Passion" – 4:49
10. "Is This Love?" – 5:52
11. "Lovers in a Dream" – 5:22
12. "Universal Here, Everlasting Now" – 5:05
13. "Don't Stop Running" ("Don't Stop Running" ends at 5:59, followed by 1:53 of silence and a hidden track titled "Road Trip") – 10:31

iTunes bonus track

14. "Sawain Ambient Acapella" – 4:53

=== Reissues ===
Electric Arguments has been reissued in several packages:

- Digital Only download; the original 13-track album as a download
- CD and digital 1 CD and download; the original 13-track album as a CD and download
- Vinyl, CD and digital 2 LPs, 1 CD and download; the original 13-track album as an LP, CD and download. On the two LPs, tracks 1–4 are side one, 5–8 are side two, 9–11 are side three, and 12–13 are side four. Unusual for an LP, the last track, "Don't Stop Running", includes the hidden track, "Road Trip", with silence separating the tracks.
- Deluxe edition (2009) 2 LPs, 2 CDs, 2 DVDs and download; a tin box set containing: the original 13-track album as an LP, CD and download. 7-track CD containing bonus mixes and alternate versions, DVD of hi-definition audio recordings, DVD of multi-track session files, 2 exclusive art prints, and extensive booklet

Disc 1
The original album

The original 13-track album.

Disc 2
bonus tracks

1. "Solstice Ambient Acapella" – 15:11
2. "Travelling Light Instrumental" – 8:16
3. "Wickerman Ambient Dub" – 12:41
4. "Morning Mist Instrumental Dub" – 5:40
5. "Equinox Instrumental" – 8:22
6. "Sawain Ambient Acapella" – 4:51
7. "Sawain Instrumental Dub" – 4:51

Disc 3
DVD – Hi-definition audio recordings

DVD Audio of the original album

1. “Highway (Electro Dynamo Lemon Sherbet Sunrise Dubstep Remix)” (bonus audio) - 5:43
2. "Sing the Changes" (music video) – 3:52
3. "Dance 'til We're High" (music video) – 3:40
4. "In the Studio" (documentary) – 12:41

Disc 4
DVD – Multi-track session files

1. "Dance 'til We're High"
2. "Highway"
3. "Light from Your Lighthouse"
4. "Sing the Changes"
5. "Sun Is Shining"

== Personnel ==
According to The Paul McCartney Project:

- Paul McCartney – lead and backing vocals, electric guitar, acoustic guitar, lap steel guitar, mandolin, bass, double-bass, piano, electric piano, harpsichord, organ, harmonium, mellotron, keyboards, synthesizer, flute, harmonica, vibraphone, cello, tambourine, percussion, drums
