= Rushes (album) =

Studio album by the Fireman
- Released: 21 September 1998 (UK), 20 October 1998 (US)
- Recorded: February 1998
- Studios: Hogg Hill Mill (Icklesham, UK)
- Genres: Ambient; industrial; experimental
- Length: 61:20
- Label: Hydra/EMI
- Producer: The Fireman

The Fireman chronology
Strawberries Oceans Ships Forest (1993)	Rushes (1998)	Electric Arguments (2008)

Paul McCartney chronology
Standing Stone (1997)	Rushes (1998)	Run Devil Run (1999)

Singles from Rushes
- 1. "Rushes" Released: 21 September 1998; 2. "Fluid (Nitin Sawhney Remixes)" Released: 1999

Rushes is the second studio album by the Fireman, released in September 1998. The title, when combined with the band name, references a lyric from the McCartney-penned Beatles song "Penny Lane": "And then the fireman rushes in / From the pouring rain / Very strange." Rushes is distinguished by not relying on McCartney's previously released recordings, unlike the band's previous album Strawberries Oceans Ships Forest.

== Recording ==
One line of lyrics included in the song "Palo Verde" was taken from an unreleased track of McCartney's, titled "Let Me Love You Always". Similarly, bits from another unreleased song, "Hey Now (What Are You Looking at Me For?)", was used in "Bison", "Auraveda" and "7 a.m.". Both unreleased tracks were recorded at some point during 1995, at McCartney's Hog Hill Mill studio. In an edition of Club Sandwich magazine, two more songs were mentioned: "Plum Jam" and "Through the Marshes". All of the tracks featured on the album were recorded in February 1998. Youth later referred to this album as the Fireman album he was most proud of.

== Release and reception ==
Professional ratings
Review scores
Source	Rating
AllMusic	4/5 stars
Encyclopedia of Popular Music	3/5 stars

Better received than predecessor Strawberries Oceans Ships Forest, to promote the album McCartney held a 70-minute webcast on 2 October 1998. He performed live on guitar, bass and keyboards to the Rushes basic tracks, while a woman was answering the questions submitted by the users. McCartney appeared in disguise during the whole show and he never spoke.

Rushes was released in the UK on Hydra on 21 September 1998, (Note: UK Hydra HYDRA 4 97055 1) while in the US it was released on 20 October 1998. The album was also released on double vinyl. (Note: UK Hydra 4970571) Two 12" singles were released from the album, both mixes of "Fluid". The first 12", (Note: UK Hydra HYDRA 12007) released on the same day as and with the same name as the album, contains the tracks "Fluid", "Appletree Cinnabar Amber", and an extended version of an album track titled "Bison (Long One)". The second 12" was released in 1999, (Note: UK Hydra HYDRA 12008) as a limited edition of 3,000, titled Fluid (Nitin Sawhney Remixes), and features three remixes of "Fluid" ("Fluid (Out of Body and Mind Mix)", "Fluid (Out of Body Mix)" and "Fluid (Out of Body with Sitar Mix)") and the album version of "Bison". Like the duo's first album, Rushes was a no-show on the charts and is also no longer in print.

== Track listing ==
All songs written by the Fireman.

1. "Watercolour Guitars" – 5:48
2. "Palo Verde" – 11:56
3. "Auraveda" – 12:51
4. "Fluid" – 11:19
5. "Appletree Cinnabar Amber" – 7:12
6. "Bison" – 2:40
7. "7 a.m." – 7:49
8. "Watercolour Rush" – 1:45

== Personnel ==
According to The Paul McCartney Project:

- Paul McCartney – vocalisations, electric guitar, acoustic guitar, bass, piano, harpsichord, harmonium, mellotron, keyboards, synthesizer, flute, sitar, tabla, shaker, tambourine, percussion, drums
