= Vanilla Sky (disambiguation) =

Vanilla Sky is a 2001 film starring Tom Cruise and directed by Cameron Crowe.

Vanilla Sky may also refer to:

- "Vanilla Sky" (song), by Paul McCartney, 2001
- Vanilla Sky, a 2019 EP by Bladee
- Vanilla Sky (band), an Italian pop punk band
- Vanilla Sky (airline), a Georgian airline also known as Service Air or AK-Air Georgia

== See also ==
- Music from Vanilla Sky, a soundtrack album from the film
