= Back in the U.S. =

2002 album by Paul McCartney

Live album by Paul McCartney
- Released: 11 November 2002
- Recorded: 1 April – 18 May 2002
- Genre: Rock
- Length: 115:21
- Label: Capitol
- Producer: David Kahne

Paul McCartney chronology
Driving Rain (2001)	Back in the U.S. (2002)	Back in the World (2003)

Professional ratings
Review scores
Source	Rating
AllMusic	2.5/5 stars
Robert Christgau	D
Encyclopedia of Popular Music	2/5 stars
Entertainment Weekly	B−
The Essential Rock Discography	5/10
The Rolling Stone Album Guide	3.5/5 stars
Uncut	4/5 stars

Back in the U.S. (subtitled Live 2002) is a double live album by Paul McCartney, recorded during the North American concerts of the Driving World Tour, embarked on in support of his 2001 album Driving Rain. . It was released in November 2002 only in the United States and Japan with an accompanying DVD to commemorate his first set of concerts in almost ten years. Four months later, an international edition with a slight track listing change, named Back in the World, came out.

== Background ==
=== Band ===
Using most of the musicians that appeared on Driving Rain, McCartney assembled a new live act composed of Rusty Anderson and Brian Ray on guitar, Abe Laboriel Jr. on drums and keyboardist Paul Wickens, who had been on McCartney's previous two tours, in 1989–90 and 1993. As of 2026, these four musicians are still members of McCartney's touring band.

== Controversy ==
Although McCartney was promoting Driving Rain, the majority of the tour setlist celebrated his past, by featuring a sampling of his solo work with and without Wings, and a substantial number of the hits he had written while a member of the Beatles. On Back in the U.S., McCartney reversed the songwriting credits for 19 Lennon–McCartney compositions to read "Paul McCartney and John Lennon" – a move that author Howard Sounes describes as the live album's "chief point of interest". This gesture was a further attempt by McCartney to establish his legacy following Lennon's death in 1980, having been vetoed from adopting the McCartney–Lennon credit during the Beatles Anthology project in 1995 by his former bandmates George Harrison and Ringo Starr.

The revised credits on Back in the U.S. incensed Lennon's widow, Yoko Ono, who threatened to take legal action, while Starr said he found McCartney's actions "underhanded". Some commentators observed that McCartney had similarly credited his Beatles songs to "McCartney–Lennon" on the 1976 live album Wings over America and that Lennon had never publicly objected to the reversal; in addition, the compositions in question were written with little or no input from Lennon. When compiling Back in the U.S., McCartney had decided to act in response to Ono's dropping of his co-writer's credit for "Give Peace a Chance", on the 1997 compilation Lennon Legend: The Very Best of John Lennon. Despite their differences on this issue, McCartney and Starr united on stage for the Harrison tribute concert shortly after the release of the live album.

== Release ==
Back in the U.S. was issued in November 2002 as an exclusive North American and Japanese release. Back in the U.S. sold well on export and gained sales of over 2 million globally. The album debuted at number 8 on the US charts with sales of 224,000 copies, marking his highest sales during a single week since the introduction of Nielsen SoundScan in 1991. The album was certified double platinum in America, for shipments of over 2 million units. It entered the top five on the Japanese chart, making McCartney one of the Western artists with the most top-ten albums in that country. Its tie-in DVD proved to be a strong seller as well. Back in the U.S. was the first Paul McCartney album not released on vinyl. It was also the last Paul McCartney album to be released on cassette in the United States until 2018’s limited release of Egypt Station and a wide release of McCartney III in 2020. Eastern countries such as Indonesia, however got releases on the format for his next two studio albums, Chaos and Creation in the Backyard and Memory Almost Full.

== Track listing ==
All songs written by Paul McCartney–John Lennon, except where noted.

=== CD ===
==== Disc one ====
1. "Hello, Goodbye" – 3:46 (Detroit)
2. "Jet" (Paul McCartney, Linda McCartney) – 4:02 (Dallas night 1 + 8 seconds of DC night 1)
3. "All My Loving" – 2:08 (Cleveland)
4. "Getting Better" – 3:10 (Denver)
5. "Coming Up" (Paul McCartney) – 3:26 (New York City Madison Square Garden Night 1)
6. "Let Me Roll It" (Paul McCartney, Linda McCartney) – 4:24 (Chicago Night 2)
7. "Lonely Road" (Paul McCartney) – 3:12 (Sunrise night 1)
8. "Driving Rain" (Paul McCartney) – 3:11 (Chicago night 2)
9. "Your Loving Flame" (Paul McCartney) – 3:28 (New York City Madison Square Garden Night 1)
10. "Blackbird" – 2:30 (Boston)
11. "Every Night" (Paul McCartney) – 2:51 (Dallas night 1)
12. "We Can Work It Out" – 2:29 (Chicago night 2)
13. "Mother Nature's Son" – 2:11 (Dallas Night 2)
14. "Vanilla Sky" (Paul McCartney) – 2:29 (Dallas night 2)
15. "You Never Give Me Your Money"/"Carry That Weight" – 3:05 (Tampa)
16. "The Fool on the Hill" – 3:09 (DC Night 1)
17. "Here Today" (Paul McCartney) – 2:28 (Toronto)
  - McCartney's tribute to John Lennon
18. "Something" (George Harrison) – 2:33 (Tampa)
  - A tribute cover of one of George Harrison's most famous songs, played on the ukulele – one of Harrison's favourite instruments

==== Disc two ====
1. "Eleanor Rigby" – 2:17 (Denver)
2. "Here, There and Everywhere" – 2:26 (Chicago night 2)
3. "Band on the Run" (Paul McCartney, Linda McCartney) – 5:00 (Dallas night 1)
4. "Back in the U.S.S.R." – 2:55 (Dallas night 1)
5. "Maybe I'm Amazed" (Paul McCartney) – 4:48 (East Rutherford)
6. "C Moon" (Paul McCartney, Linda McCartney) – 3:51 (DC night 1)
7. "My Love" (Paul McCartney, Linda McCartney) – 4:03 (Dallas night 1)
8. "Can't Buy Me Love" – 2:09 (Atlanta night 2)
9. "Freedom" (Paul McCartney) – 3:18 (Dallas night 1)
10. "Live and Let Die" (Paul McCartney, Linda McCartney) – 3:05 (Dallas night 1)
11. "Let It Be" – 3:57 (Atlanta night 2)
12. "Hey Jude" – 7:01 (NYC Madison Square Garden Night 1)
13. "The Long and Winding Road" – 3:30 (Denver)
14. "Lady Madonna" – 2:21 (NYC Madison Square Garden night 1)
15. "I Saw Her Standing There" – 3:08 (Sunrise)
16. "Yesterday" – 2:08 (Dallas night 1)
17. "Sgt. Pepper's Lonely Hearts Club Band (Reprise)" / "The End" – 4:39 (Sunrise night 1)

=== DVD ===
1. "Hello, Goodbye"
2. "Jet" (Paul McCartney, Linda McCartney)
3. "All My Loving"
4. "Live and Let Die" (Paul McCartney, Linda McCartney)
5. "Coming Up" (Paul McCartney)
6. "Blackbird"
7. "We Can Work It Out"
8. "Here, There, and Everywhere"
9. "Eleanor Rigby"
10. "Matchbox" (Carl Perkins)
11. "Your Loving Flame" (Paul McCartney)
12. "The Fool on the Hill"
13. "Getting Better"
14. "Here Today" (Paul McCartney)
15. "Something" (George Harrison)
16. "Band on the Run" (Paul McCartney, Linda McCartney)
17. "Let Me Roll It" (Paul McCartney, Linda McCartney)
18. "Back in the USSR"
19. "My Love" (Paul McCartney, Linda McCartney)
20. "Maybe I'm Amazed" (Paul McCartney)
21. "Freedom" (Paul McCartney)
22. "Let it Be"
23. "Hey Jude"
24. "Can't Buy Me Love"
25. "Lady Madonna"
26. "The Long and Winding Road"
27. "Yesterday"
28. "Sgt. Pepper's Lonely Hearts Club Band" / "The End"
29. "I Saw Her Standing There"

==== Bonus tracks ====
1. "Driving Rain" (Paul McCartney)
2. "Every Night" (Paul McCartney)
3. "You Never Give Me Your Money"/"Carry That Weight"

== Personnel ==
According to the album's liner notes:

- Paul McCartney - vocals, bass, guitars, piano
- Brian Ray - guitars, bass, backing vocals
- Rusty Anderson – guitars, backing vocals
- Paul "Wix" Wickens - keyboards, piano, organ, synthesizers, backing vocals
- Abe Laboriel Jr. – drums, percussion, backing vocals

== Charts and certifications ==
=== Weekly charts ===
Album

Chart (2002–03)	Position
Japanese Oricon Albums Chart	4
US Billboard 200	8

DVD

Chart (2003)	Position
Japanese Oricon DVDs Chart	18

=== Year-end charts ===
Year-end chart performance for Back in the U.S.
Chart (2002)	Position
Canadian Albums (Nielsen SoundScan)	100

Chart (2003)	Position
US Billboard Year-End	71

=== Certifications ===
Album

Region	Certification	Certified units/sales
Canada (Music Canada)	2× Platinum	200,000^{^}
Denmark (IFPI Danmark)	Gold	25,000^{^}
Japan (RIAJ)	Gold	100,000^{^}
United States (RIAA)	2× Platinum	1,000,000^{^}
^{^} Shipments figures based on certification alone.

DVD

Region	Certification	Certified units/sales
Argentina (CAPIF)	Platinum	8,000^{^}
Canada (Music Canada)	4× Platinum	40,000^{^}
Denmark (IFPI Danmark)	Gold	25,000^{^}
Germany (BVMI)	Gold	25,000^{^}
Mexico (AMPROFON)	Gold	10,000^{^}
United Kingdom (BPI)	Gold	25,000^{*}
United States (RIAA)	3× Platinum	300,000^{^}
^{*} Sales figures based on certification alone.^{^} Shipments figures based on certification alone.

== Back in the World ==
Back in the World

Live album by Paul McCartney
- Released: 17 March 2003
- Recorded: 1 April – 18 May and 17 November 2002
- Genre: Rock
- Length: 121:25
- Label: Parlophone
- Producer: David Kahne

Paul McCartney chronology
Back in the U.S. (2002)	Back in the World (2003)	Twin Freaks (2005)

Professional ratings
Review scores
Source	Rating
Encyclopedia of Popular Music	2/5 stars

Back in the World (subtitled Live), very similar to the North American album in content, was released internationally in 2003, save for North America – where Back in the U.S. saw issue four months earlier.

The main difference between Back in the U.S. and Back in the World is that "Vanilla Sky" has been dropped from the latter's first disc, while two of the tracks from the second disc ("C Moon" and the post-9/11 "Freedom") have been replaced with four exclusive songs not found on Back in the U.S.: "Calico Skies", "Michelle", "Let 'Em In" and "She's Leaving Home". Another difference is that the version of "Hey Jude" on Back in the World comes from a different show than the version on Back in the U.S..

Upon its release, Back in the World far outperformed Driving Rain in the UK, reaching No. 5 and becoming a major hit for McCartney.

=== Track listing ===
All songs by Paul McCartney–John Lennon except where noted.

==== Disc one ====
1. "Hello, Goodbye" – 3:46
2. "Jet" (Paul McCartney/Linda McCartney) – 4:02
3. "All My Loving" – 2:08
4. "Getting Better" – 3:10
5. "Coming Up" (Paul McCartney) – 3:26
6. "Let Me Roll It" (Paul McCartney/Linda McCartney) – 4:24
7. "Lonely Road" (Paul McCartney) – 3:12
8. "Driving Rain" (Paul McCartney) – 3:11
9. "Your Loving Flame" (Paul McCartney) – 3:28
10. "Blackbird" – 2:30
11. "Every Night" (Paul McCartney) – 2:51
12. "We Can Work It Out" – 2:29
13. "Mother Nature's Son" – 2:11
14. "You Never Give Me Your Money"/"Carry That Weight" – 3:05
15. "The Fool on the Hill" – 3:09
16. "Here Today" (Paul McCartney) – 2:28
17. "Something" (George Harrison) – 2:33

=== Disc two ===
1. "Eleanor Rigby" – 2:17
2. "Here, There and Everywhere" – 2:23
3. "Calico Skies" (Paul McCartney) – 2:38 (Osaka Dome, Japan)
4. "Michelle" – 3:15 (Mexico City)
5. "Band on the Run" (Paul McCartney/Linda McCartney) – 5:00
6. "Back in the U.S.S.R." – 2:56
7. "Maybe I'm Amazed" (Paul McCartney) – 4:47
8. "Let 'Em In" (Paul McCartney) – 5:23 (Tokyo Dome, Japan)
9. "My Love" (Paul McCartney/Linda McCartney) – 4:04
10. "She's Leaving Home" – 3:52 (Mexico City)
11. "Can't Buy Me Love" – 2:11
12. "Live and Let Die" (Paul McCartney/Linda McCartney) – 3:05
13. "Let It Be" – 3:58
14. "Hey Jude" – 7:35 (Mexico City) (Note: On "Back in the U.S.", the song is performed in New York City.)
15. "The Long and Winding Road" – 3:30
16. "Lady Madonna" – 2:21
17. "I Saw Her Standing There" – 3:08
18. "Yesterday" – 2:08
19. "Sgt. Pepper's Lonely Hearts Club Band (Reprise)" / "The End" – 4:40

=== Personnel ===
- Paul McCartney – vocals, bass, guitars, piano
- Brian Ray – guitars, bass, backing vocals
- Rusty Anderson – guitars, backing vocals
- Paul "Wix" Wickens – keyboards, piano, organ, synthesizers, backing vocals
- Abe Laboriel Jr. – drums

=== Charts ===
==== Weekly charts ====
Chart (2003)	Peak position
Austrian Albums (Ö3 Austria)	17
Belgian Albums (Ultratop Flanders)	4
Belgian Albums (Ultratop Wallonia)	6
Danish Albums (Hitlisten)	6
Dutch Albums (Album Top 100)	16
Finnish Albums (Suomen virallinen lista)	15
French Albums (SNEP)	23
German Albums (Offizielle Top 100)	10
Hungarian Albums (MAHASZ)	31
Irish Albums (IRMA)	18
Italian Albums (FIMI)	32
Japanese Albums (Oricon)	196
Scottish Albums (Official Charts)	7
Swedish Albums (Sverigetopplistan)	12
Swiss Albums (Schweizer Hitparade)	68
UK Albums (Official Charts)	5

==== Year-end charts ====
Chart (2003)	Position
Belgian Albums (Ultratop Flanders)	90
Belgian Albums (Ultratop Wallonia)	74
UK Albums (OCC)	115

== Sources ==
- Doggett, Peter (2011). You Never Give Me Your Money: The Beatles After the Breakup. New York, NY: It Books. ISBN 978-0-06-177418-8.
- Kimsey, John (2006). "Spinning the Historical Record: Lennon, McCartney, and Museum Politics". In: Kenneth Womack and Todd F. Davis (eds). Reading the Beatles: Cultural Studies, Literary Criticism, and the Fab Four. Albany, NY: SUNY Press. ISBN 978-0-7914-6716-9.
- Rodriguez, Robert (2010). Fab Four FAQ 2.0: The Beatles' Solo Years, 1970–1980. Milwaukee, WI: Backbeat Books. ISBN 978-1-4165-9093-4.
- Sounes, Howard (2010). Fab: An Intimate Life of Paul McCartney. London: HarperCollins. ISBN 978-0-00-723705-0.
