= 7th Critics' Choice Awards =

2002 US film awards

- Date: January 11, 2002
- Official website: www.criticschoice.com

Highlights
- Best Film: A Beautiful Mind

The 7th Critics' Choice Awards were presented on January 11, 2002, honoring the finest achievements of 2001 filmmaking.

== Top 10 films ==
(in alphabetical order)

- Ali
- A Beautiful Mind
- In the Bedroom
- The Lord of the Rings: The Fellowship of the Ring
- The Man Who Wasn't There
- Memento
- Moulin Rouge!
- Mulholland Drive
- The Shipping News
- Shrek

== Winners and nominees ==
=== Film ===
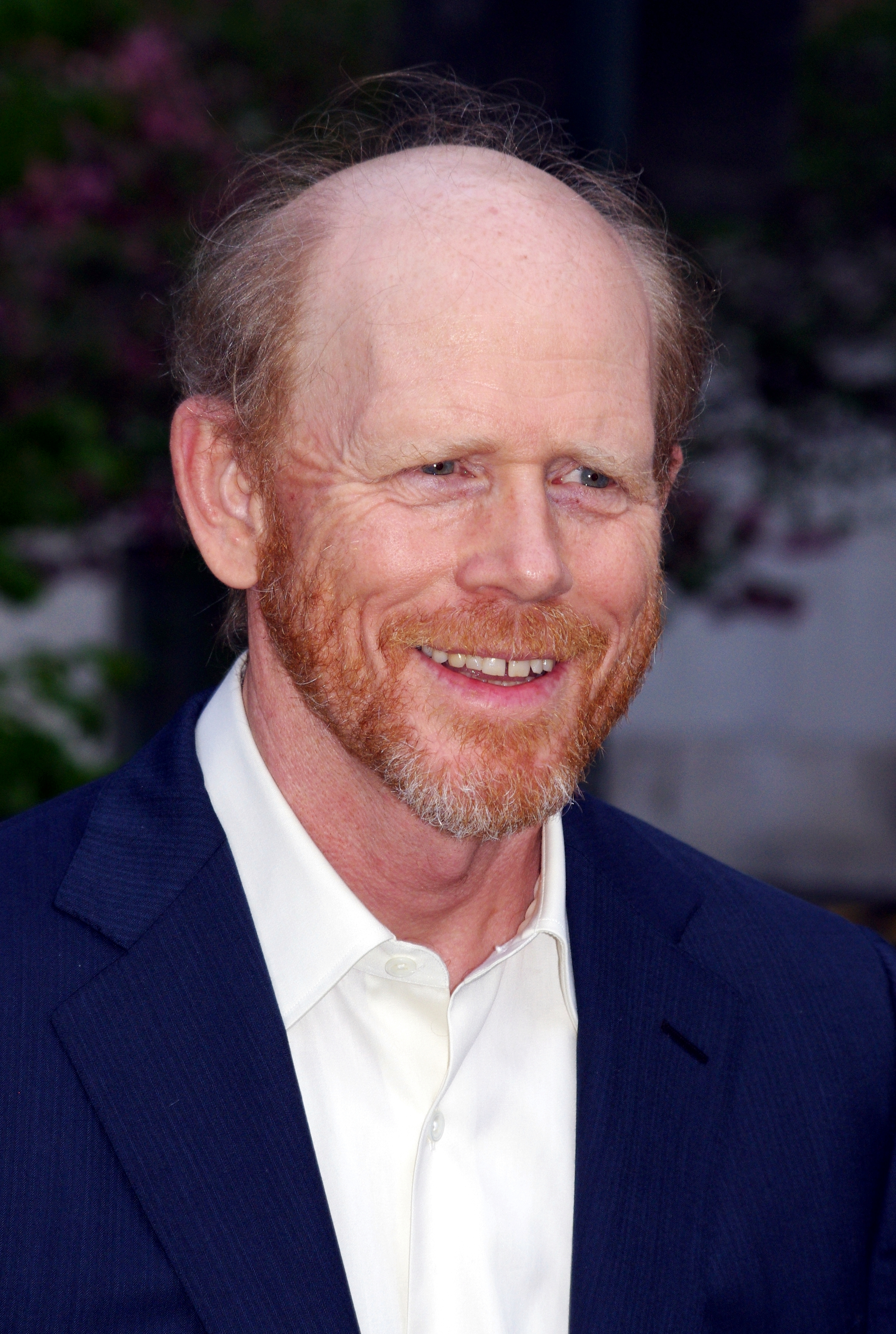
Ron Howard, Best Director co-winner

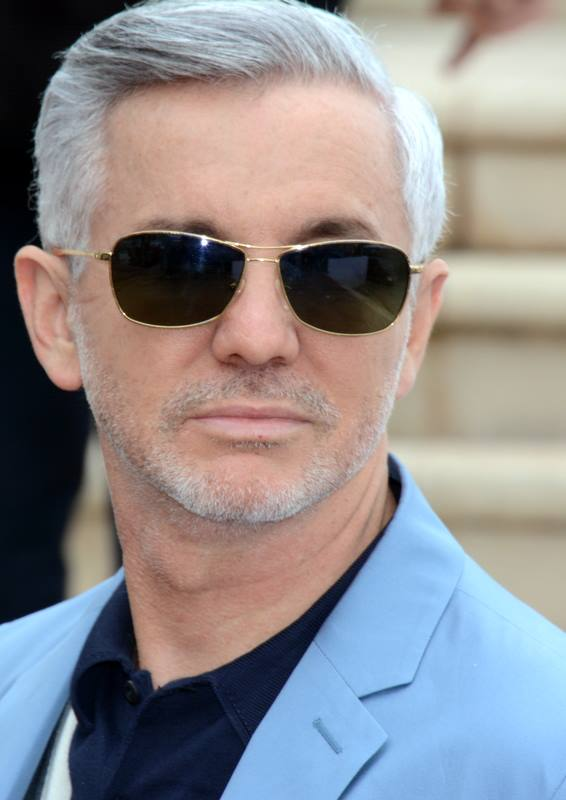
Baz Luhrmann, Best Director co-winner

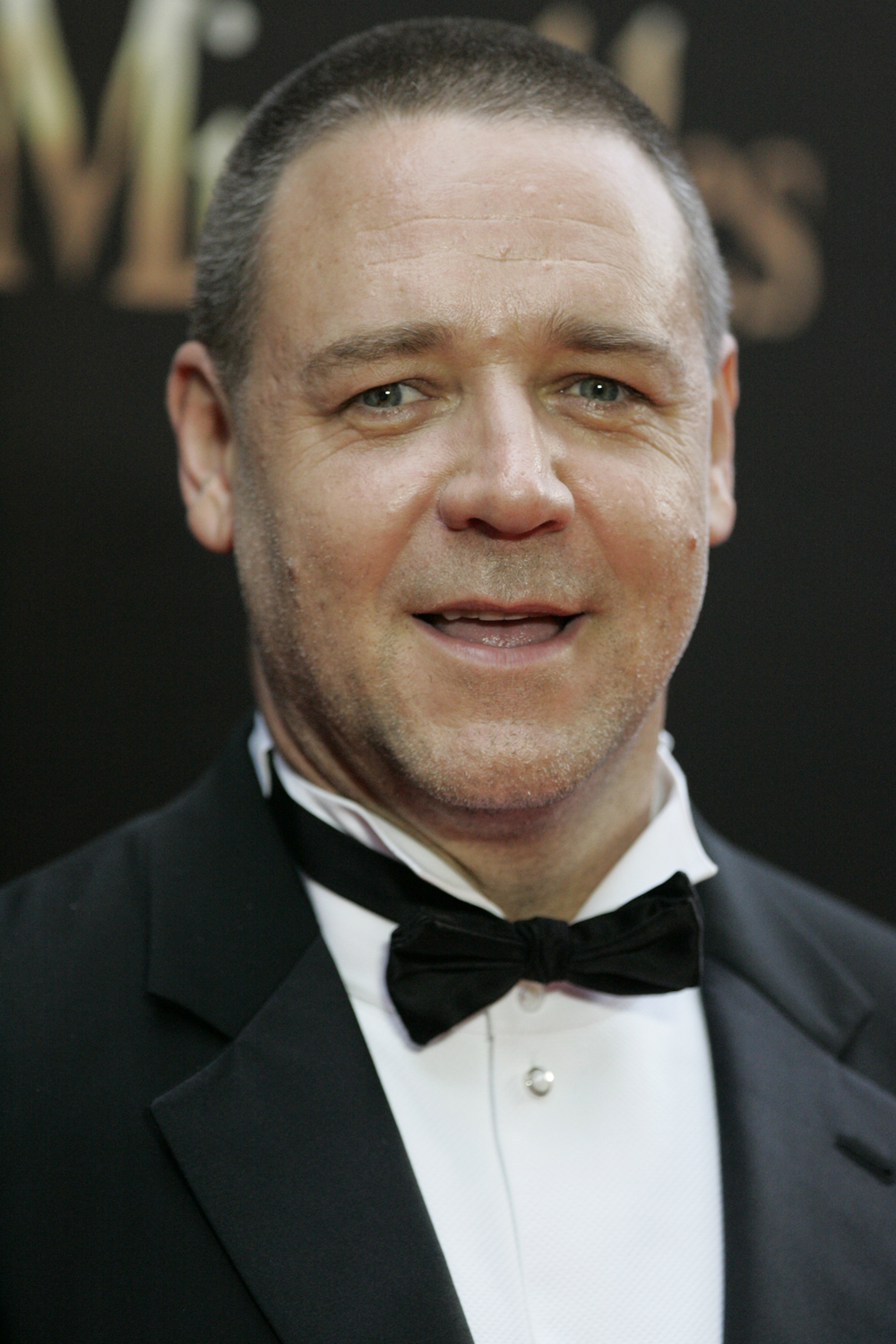
Russell Crowe, Best Actor winner

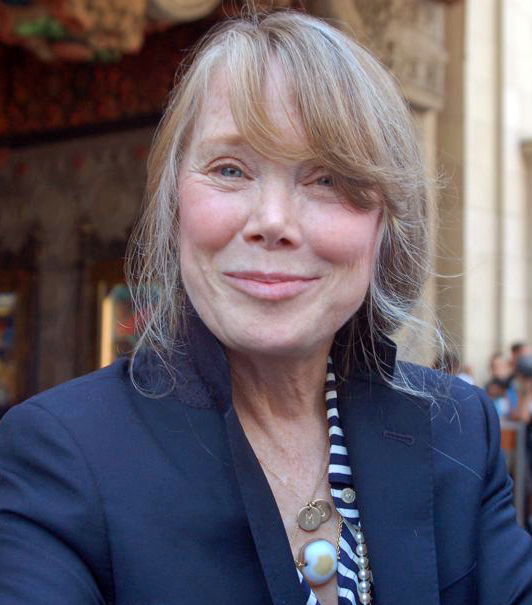
Sissy Spacek, Best Actress winner

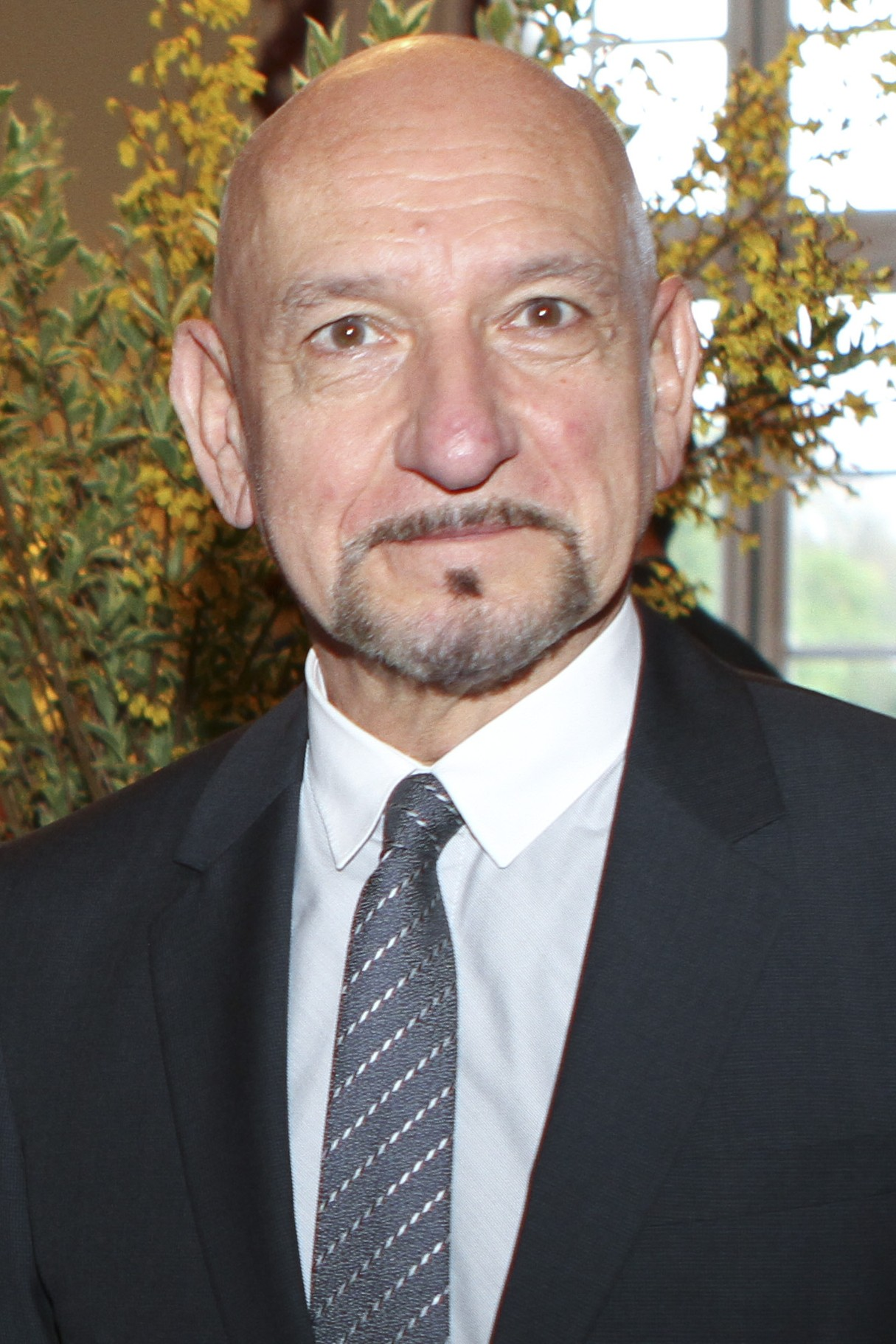
Ben Kingsley, Best Supporting Actor winner

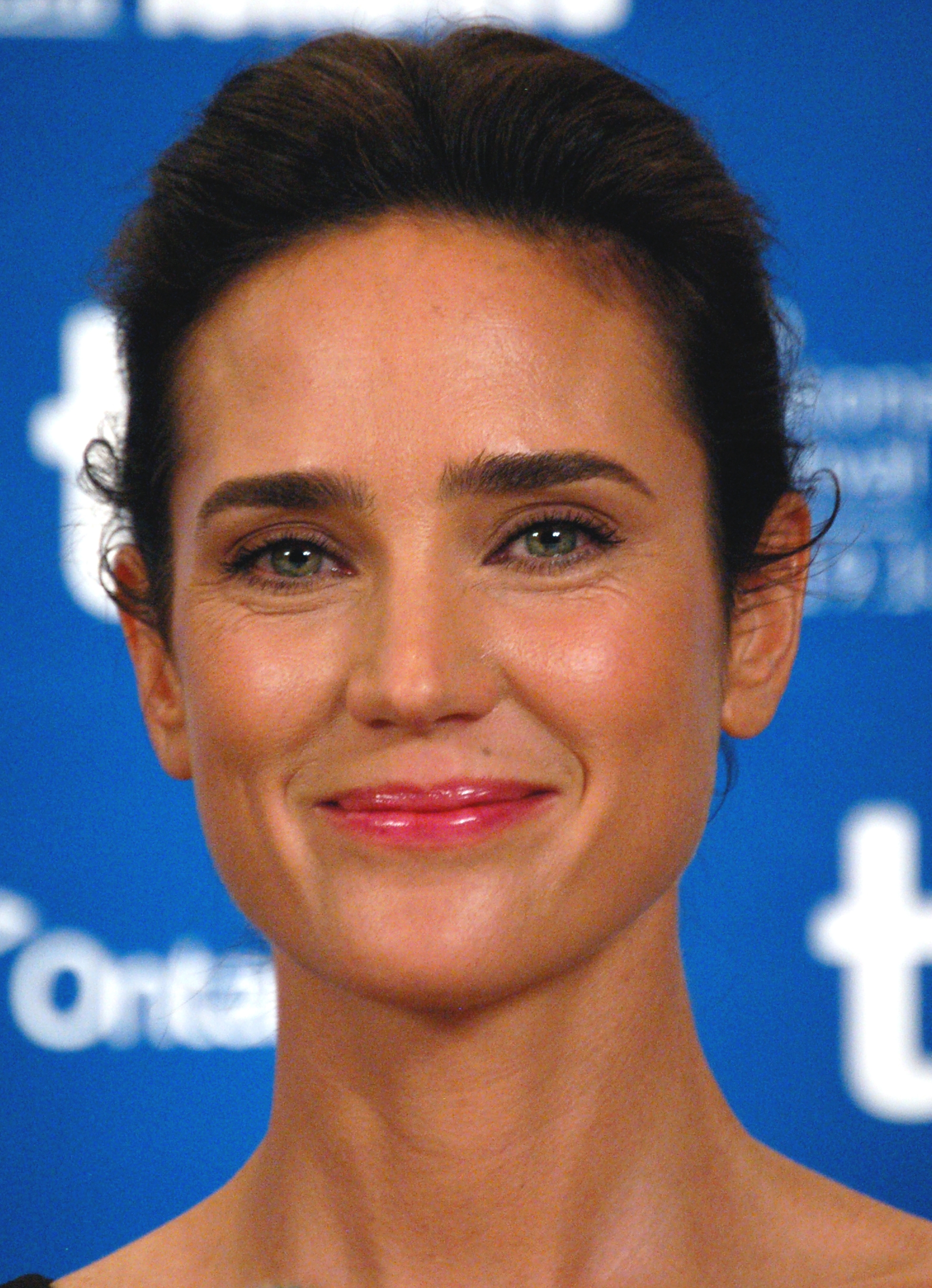
Jennifer Connelly, Best Supporting Actress winner

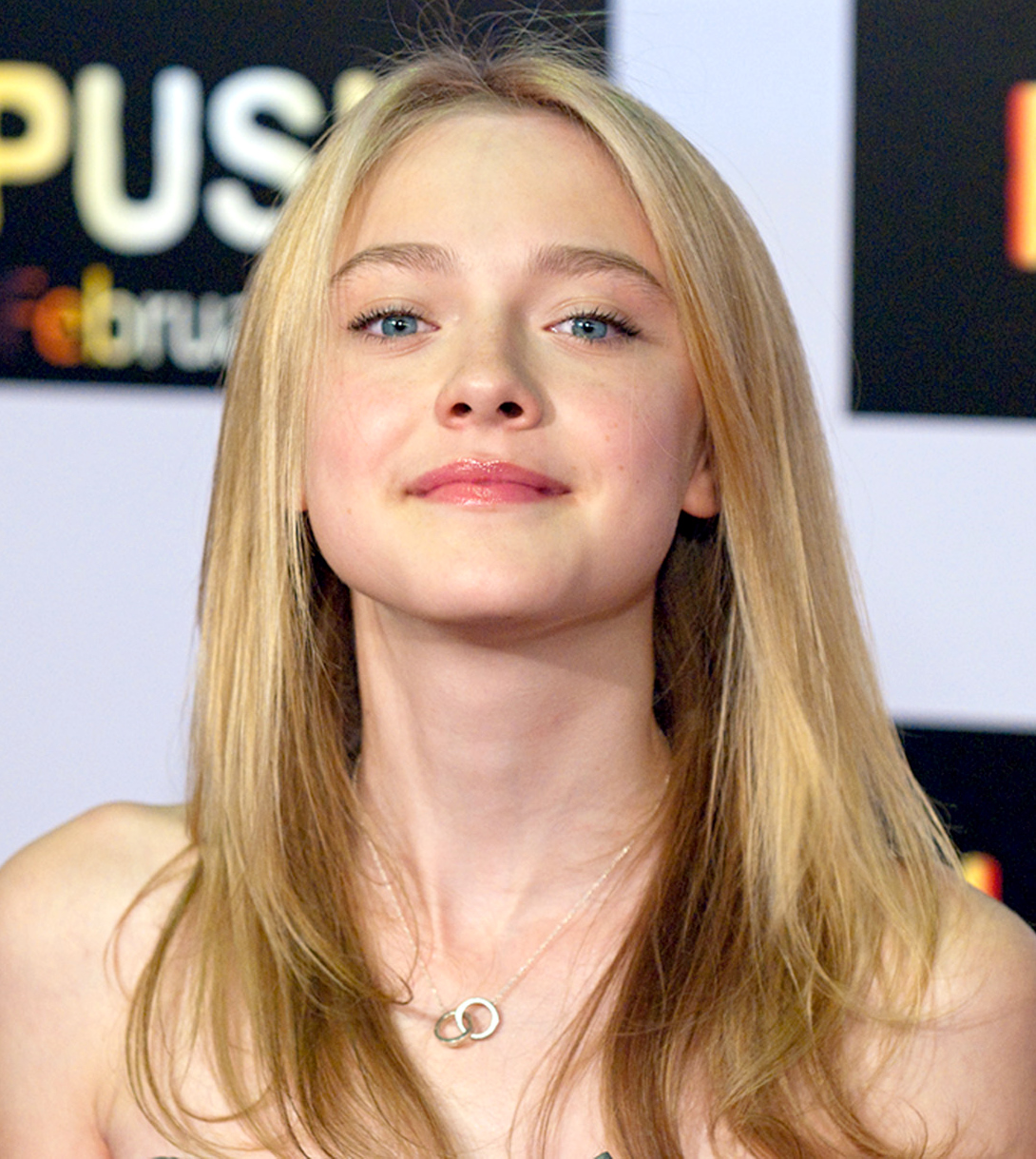
Dakota Fanning, Best Young Actor/Actress winner

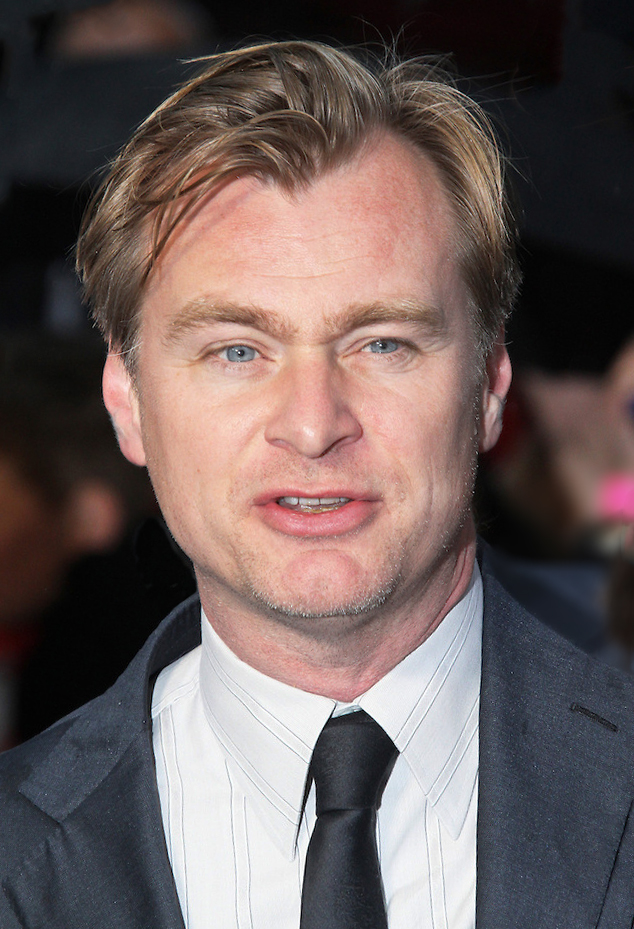
Christopher Nolan, Best Screenplay winner

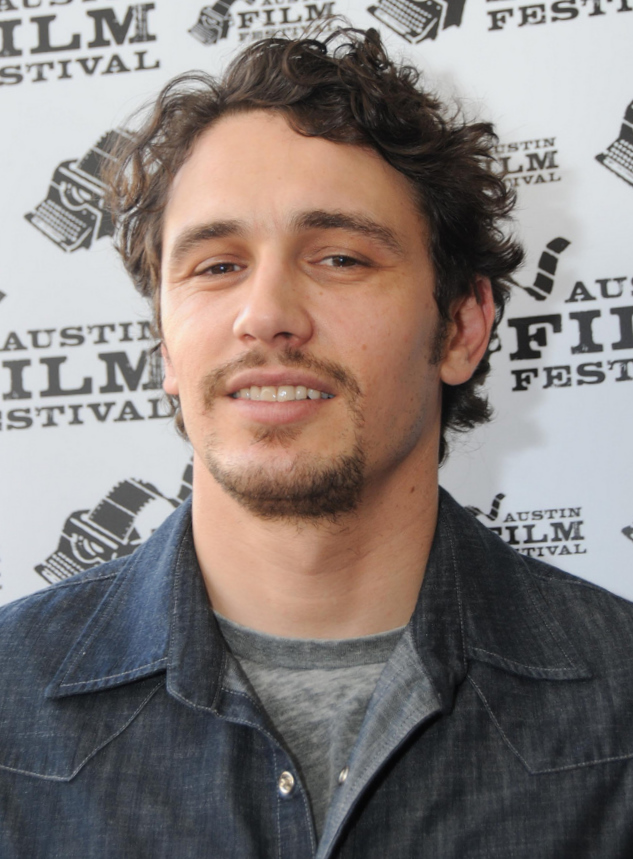
James Franco, Best Actor in a Picture Made for Television winner

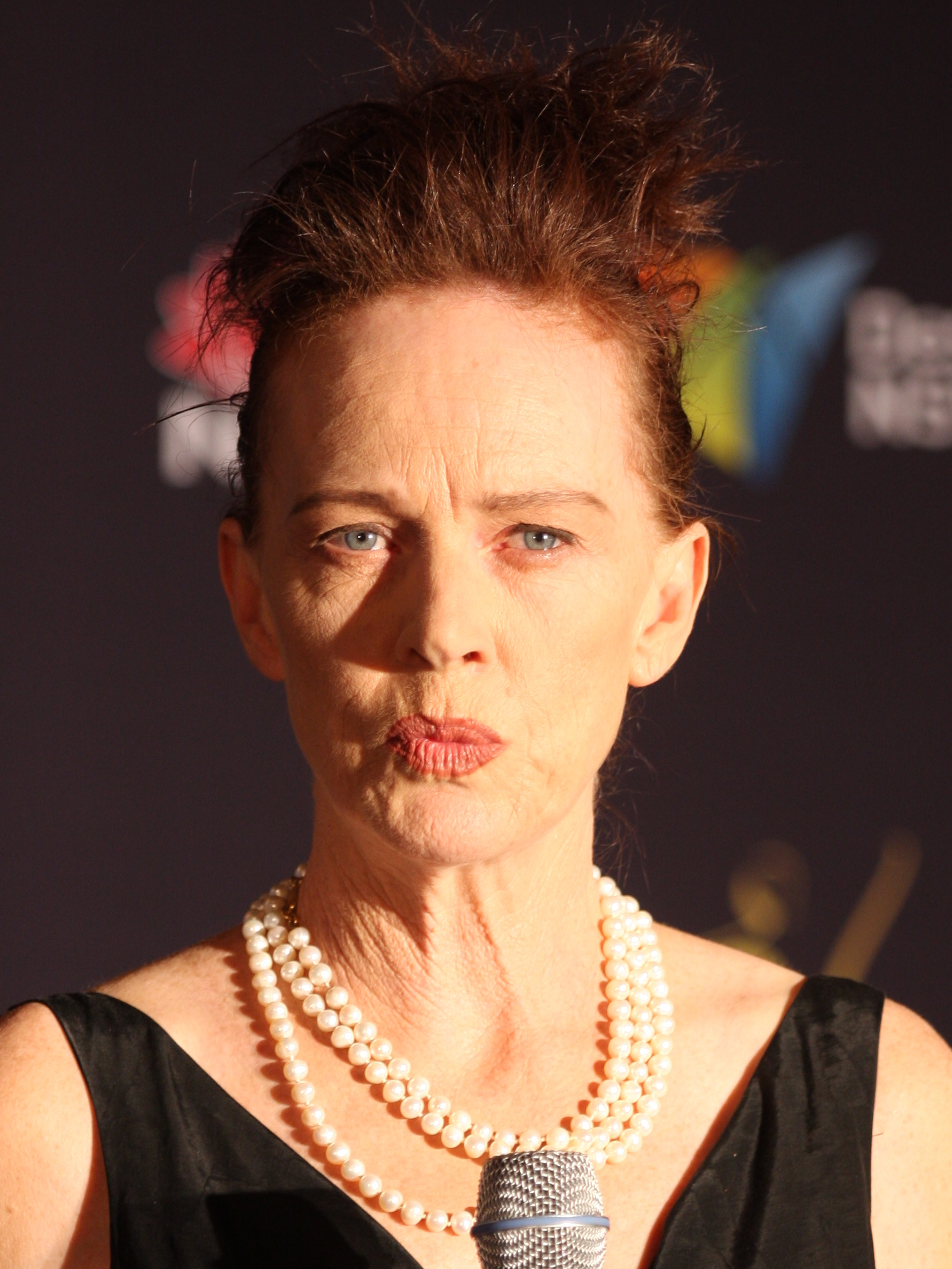
Judy Davis, Best Actress in a Picture Made for Television winner

Best Picture A Beautiful Mind: Ali; In the Bedroom; The Lord of the Rings: The Fellowship of the Ring; The Man Who Wasn't There; Memento; Moulin Rouge!; Mulholland Drive; The Shipping News; Shrek	Best Director Ron Howard – A Beautiful Mind (TIE); Baz Luhrmann – Moulin Rouge! (TIE): Peter Jackson – The Lord of the Rings: The Fellowship of the Ring
Best Actor Russell Crowe – A Beautiful Mind as John Forbes Nash Jr.: Sean Penn – I Am Sam as Sam Dawson; Will Smith – Ali as Muhammad Ali	Best Actress Sissy Spacek – In the Bedroom as Ruth Fowler: Nicole Kidman – Moulin Rouge! as Satine; Renée Zellweger – Bridget Jones's Diary as Bridget Jones
Best Supporting Actor Ben Kingsley – Sexy Beast as Don Logan: Jim Broadbent – Iris as John Bayley; Jon Voight – Ali as Howard Cosell	Best Supporting Actress Jennifer Connelly – A Beautiful Mind as Alicia Nash: Cameron Diaz – Vanilla Sky as Julianna Gianni; Marisa Tomei – In the Bedroom as Natalie Strout
Best Young Actor/Actress Dakota Fanning – I Am Sam as Lucy Dawson: Haley Joel Osment – A.I. Artificial Intelligence as David; Daniel Radcliffe – Harry Potter and the Sorcerer's Stone as Harry Potter	Best Acting Ensemble Gosford Park: Ocean's Eleven; The Royal Tenenbaums
Best Screenplay Memento – Christopher Nolan: A Beautiful Mind – Akiva Goldsman; The Man Who Wasn't There – Joel Coen and Ethan Coen	Best Animated Feature Shrek: Monsters, Inc.; Waking Life
Best Family Film Harry Potter and the Sorcerer's Stone: The Princess Diaries; Spy Kids	Best Foreign Language Film Amélie • France: In the Mood for Love • France / Hong Kong; No Man's Land • Bosnia and Herzegovina
Best Composer The Lord of the Rings: The Fellowship of the Ring – Howard Shore: A.I. Artificial Intelligence – John Williams; Harry Potter and the Sorcerer's Stone – John Williams; The Shipping News – Christopher Young	Best Song "May It Be" – The Lord of the Rings: The Fellowship of the Ring (TIE) "Vanilla Sky" – Vanilla Sky (TIE): "There You'll Be" – Pearl Harbor; "Until..." – Kate & Leopold

=== Television ===
Best Picture Made for Television Life with Judy Garland: Me and My Shadows: Band of Brothers; The Mists of Avalon
Best Actor in a Picture Made for Television James Franco – James Dean as James Dean: Hank Azaria – Uprising as Mordechai Anielewicz; Barry Pepper – 61* as Roger Maris	Best Actress in a Picture Made for Television Judy Davis – Life with Judy Garland: Me and My Shadows as Judy Garland: Salma Hayek – In the Time of the Butterflies as Minerva Mirabal; Emma Thompson – Wit as Vivian Bearing

=== Freedom Award ===
Muhammad Ali

== Statistics ==
Nominations	Film
5	A Beautiful Mind
4	The Lord of the Rings: The Fellowship of the Ring
3	Ali
3	Harry Potter and the Sorcerer's Stone
3	In the Bedroom
3	Moulin Rouge!
2	A.I. Artificial Intelligence
2	I Am Sam
2	Life with Judy Garland: Me and My Shadows
2	The Man Who Wasn't There
2	Memento
2	The Shipping News
2	Shrek
2	Vanilla Sky

Wins	Film
4	A Beautiful Mind
2	Life with Judy Garland: Me and My Shadows
2	The Lord of the Rings: The Fellowship of the Ring
