= Lonely Road (Paul McCartney song) =

- Promotional CD single cover

Promotional single by Paul McCartney

from the album Driving Rain
- Released: 1 March 2002
- Recorded: 16 February 2001
- Studio: Henson Recording Studio (Los Angeles)
- Genre: Rock
- Length: 3:16
- Label: Parlophone
- Songwriter: Paul McCartney
- Producer: David Kahne

Paul McCartney promotional singles chronology
"Your Loving Flame" (2002)	"Lonely Road" (2002)	"This Never Happened Before" (2006)

Music video
- "Lonely Road" on YouTube

"Lonely Road" is a song by Paul McCartney, released as a promotional single from his album Driving Rain in 2002. It had a music video made for it that was directed by Jonas Åkerlund.

== Background and composition ==
McCartney wrote the song on a beach vacation in India, which he states that "I don't really know what i'm doing, just blues longing". The song itself is about a woman that still admires the singer's attempts at showing his love for her even after she rejects him. The track may be best known for its debuts of McCartney's current touring guitarist and drummer, Rusty Anderson and Abe Laboriel Jr. Paul later stated on his website that "You can make of it what you want to make of [the track]. To me, it's not particularly about anything other than not wanting to be brought down." The song was recorded on 16 February 2001 onto a 16-track analogue tape then loaded into Logic for overdubs.

== Release and reception ==
In a ranking of every Paul McCartney album opener, Nick DeRiso placed it at number 23, stating that it "very much retains that vibe" of it being written in India. In an E! Online review, the site called it, alongside "It Must Have Been Magic," "Your Way" and "Back in the Sunshine" "redemption songs, not exercises in self-pity". Billboard stated it "is not only mundane, but McCartney's voice is processed to the point that one has to wonder if perhaps it's time to sit out a round and let the new kids on the block have their turn at the mike [sic]", noting that "there comes a time when it's best to herald the past and enjoy the honor that comes with being a living legend" concluding by noting that "This 'Road' simply goes nowhere." A live version appears on the 2002 live album Back in the U.S.: Live 2002. In San Francisco Chronicle, James Sullivan called it a "boisterous" album opener when talking about McCartneys U.S. tour. (Note: Pages of San Francisco Chronicle:)

== Credits and personnel ==
According to the Paul McCartney Project and the liner notes of Driving Rain:

- Paul McCartney – vocals, electric and acoustic guitars, bass guitar
- Rusty Anderson – acoustic and electric guitars, pedal steel guitar
- Abe Laboriel Jr. – drums, tambourine
- Gabe Dixon – electric piano
- David Kahne – organ
