= New York City Fire Department Ladder Company 3 =

Coordinates: 40.73320°N 73.98938°W

Ladder Company 3

Agency overview
- Established: September 11, 1865
- Employees: 25

Facilities and equipment
- Stations: 108 E. 13th St, New York City, New York
- Trucks: 1

New York City Fire Department Ladder Company 3, also known as Ladder 3, is a fire company and one of two ladder companies in the New York City Fire Department's (FDNY) 6th Battalion, 1st Division. It is housed at 108 E. 13th St., along with Battalion Chief 6, and has firefighting stewardship over a several square block area of Manhattan’s East Village. The company was created in 1865 and is one of New York’s oldest ladder companies.

== History ==
The company was established as Metropolitan Hook & Ladder Company No. 3 on September 11, 1865, which was located at 78 East 13th Street at the former quarters of Friendship Hook and Ladder Company No. 12. (Note: No. 78 East 13th Street was renumbered as No. 108 East 13th Street in the 1860s.) It is one of New York's oldest ladder companies, and was one of the first six hook and ladder companies organized when the Metropolitan Fire Department was created that same year.

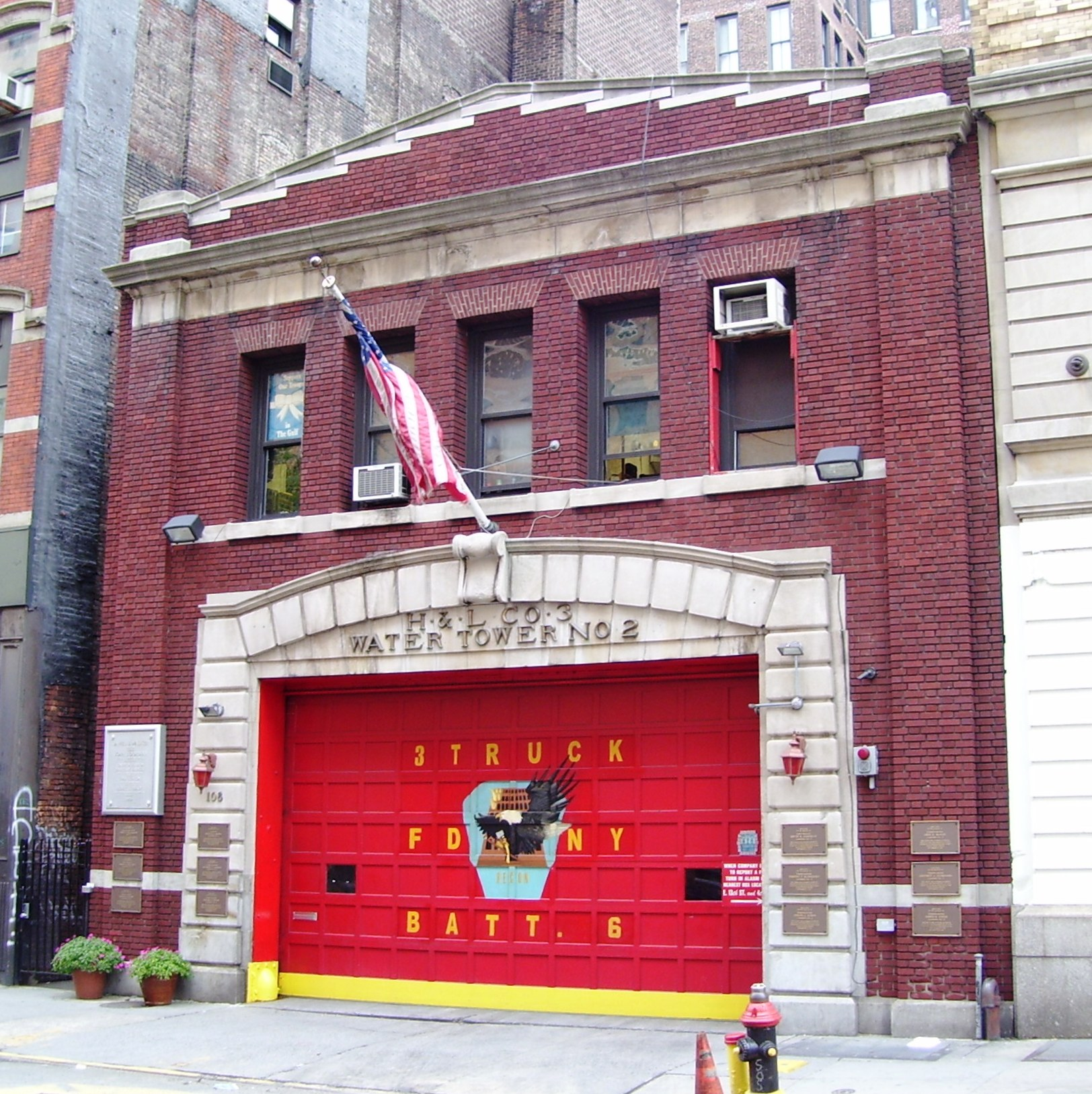
The firehouse in 2010, displaying the names of Hook & Ladder Co. 3 and Water Tower No. 2 above the entrance

The current two-story brick fire house, which was designed by architect John R. Sliney, was opened by New York City Mayor Jimmy Walker on October 8, 1929. The new fire house served as the quarters of Hook & Ladder Company 3, Water Tower No. 2 and Battalion Chief 6, replacing an earlier structure that had occupied the site. When the building opened, it housed a new water tower built by the Seagrave Corporation. Designated as Water Tower No. 2, the apparatus could be raised to a height of 65 feet (20 m) in thirty seconds and was capable of delivering 3,000 US gallons (11,000 L) of water a minute to fight fires in skyscrapers.

On July 11, 1984, a plaque was dedicated at the fire house as a memorial to the members of Ladder Company 3 and Battalion 6 that were killed in the line of duty. The plaque was installed following a visit to the fire house by the son of Francis Donelon, a firefighter from Hook and Ladder Company 3 who was killed on August 10, 1930 while fighting a fire on the Third Avenue Elevated when the ladder he was on was struck by a train.

During the September 11 attacks, the company reported to the North Tower of the World Trade Center. As the time of the attacks coincided with the morning tour change, both tours remained on duty, and the company arrived at the World Trade Center carrying more men than usual. Captain Patrick J. Brown and his men were last known to be on the 35th floor of the tower before the North Tower collapsed. Ladder Company 3 was last Chauffered by Firefighter Michael T. Carroll, and received some of the heaviest casualties of any fire company in the FDNY.

Ladder Company 3's apparatus, a Seagrave rearmount ladder truck placed in service in 1994, shop number SL9413, was parked on West Street next to Six World Trade Center. It was damaged beyond repair by the collapse of the Twin Towers and spent ten years housed at Hangar 17 at JFK Airport. In 2011, the ladder truck was made part of the National September 11 Memorial & Museum. The flag-covered, 60,000-pound (27,000 kg) truck was lowered by crane 70 feet (21 m) below ground and observed by firefighters, victims' families and other bystanders, as the FDNY Emerald Society performed "Amazing Grace" on bagpipes as they would at the funeral of a fallen FDNY member. It is intended to represent the members it lost on September 11 as well as all FDNY casualties.

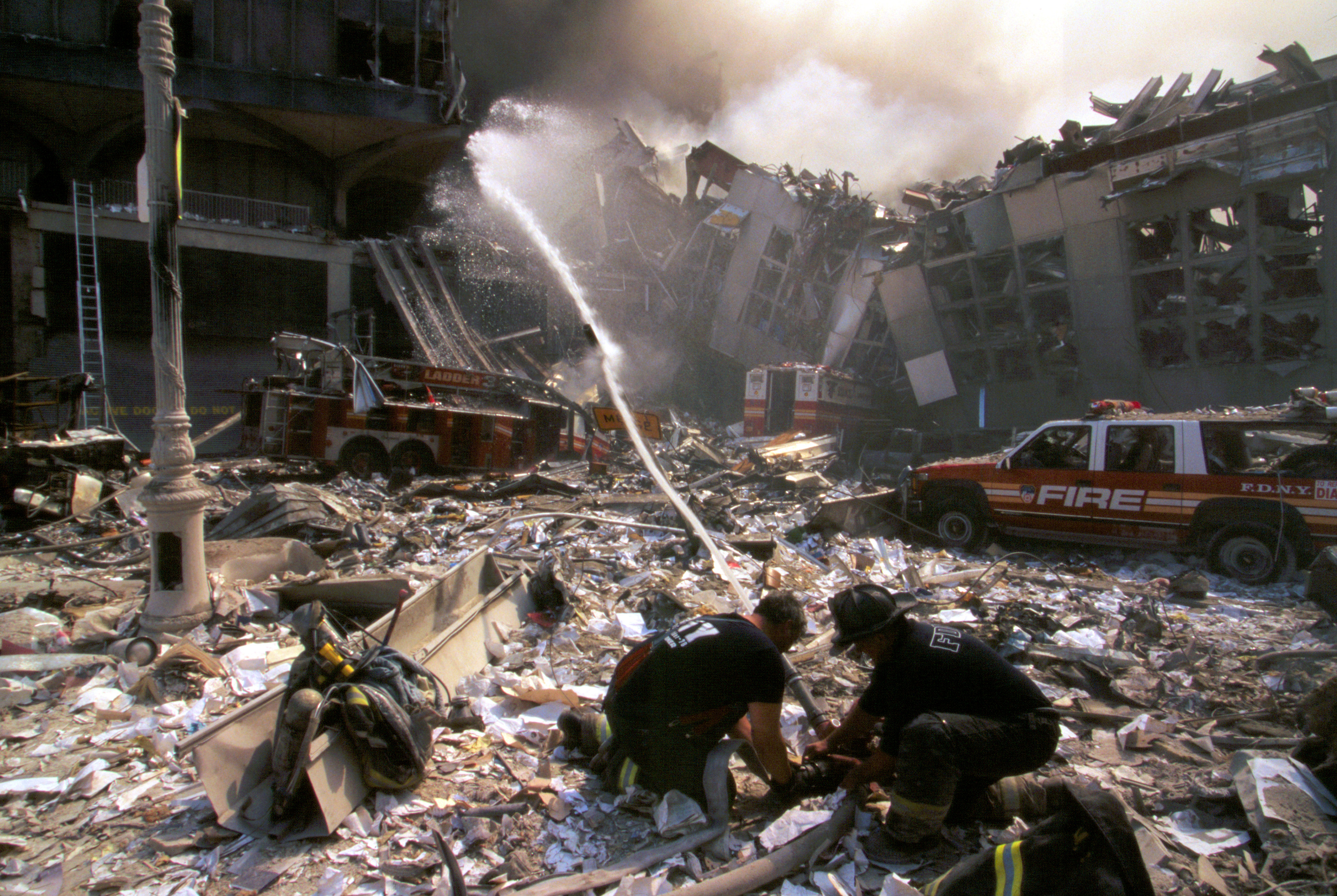
Firefighters on West Street direct a hosestream towards Six World Trade Center. Ladder 3's ladder truck is visible in the background, left of center. Right of center, partly crushed beneath the north pedestrian bridge, sits Rescue 1's apparatus.

Sheathed in plastic and US and FDNY flags, Ladder 3's ladder truck is prepared to be lowered into the National September 11 Memorial & Museum

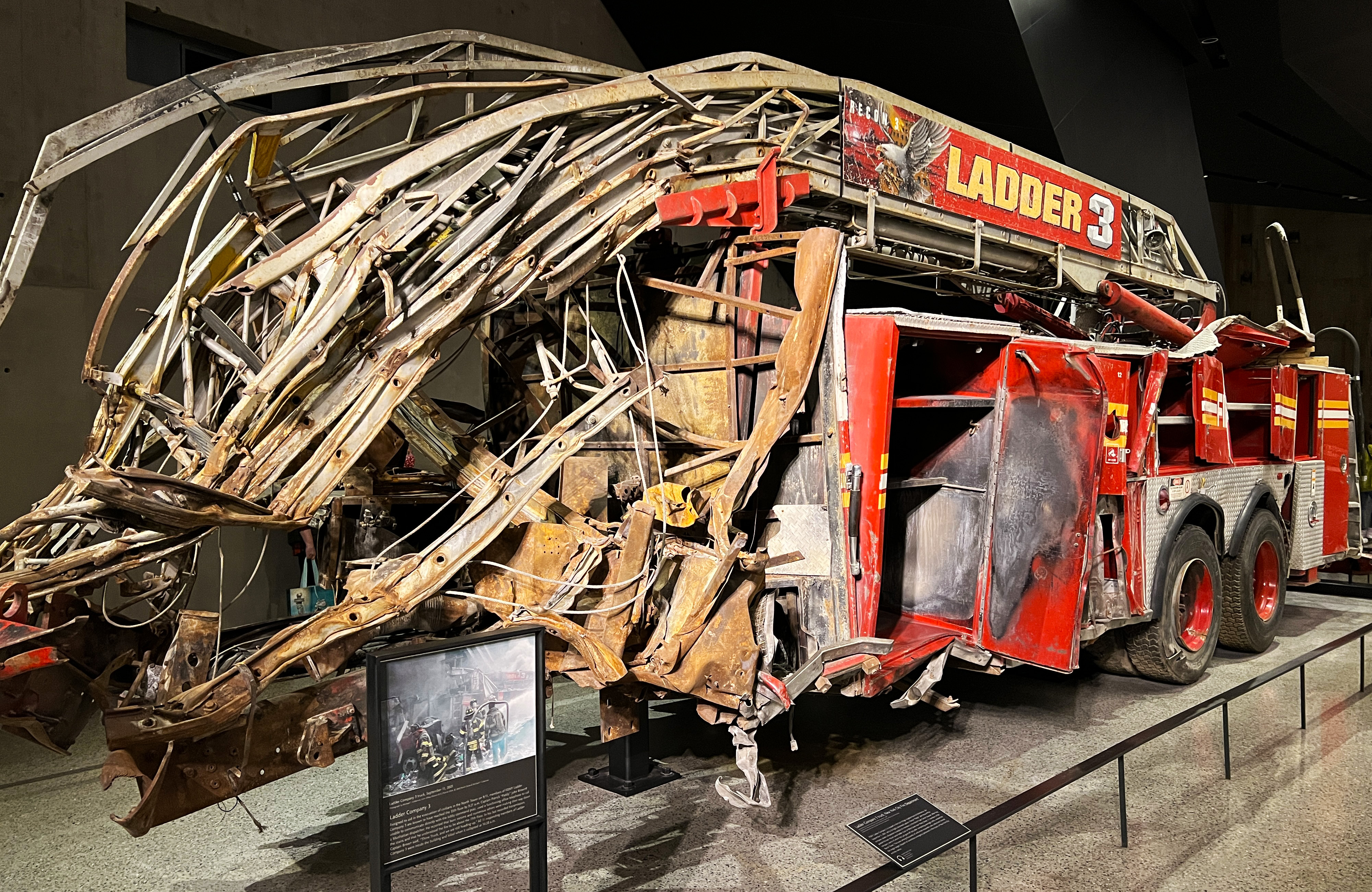
Ladder 3's truck at the National September 11 Memorial & Museum

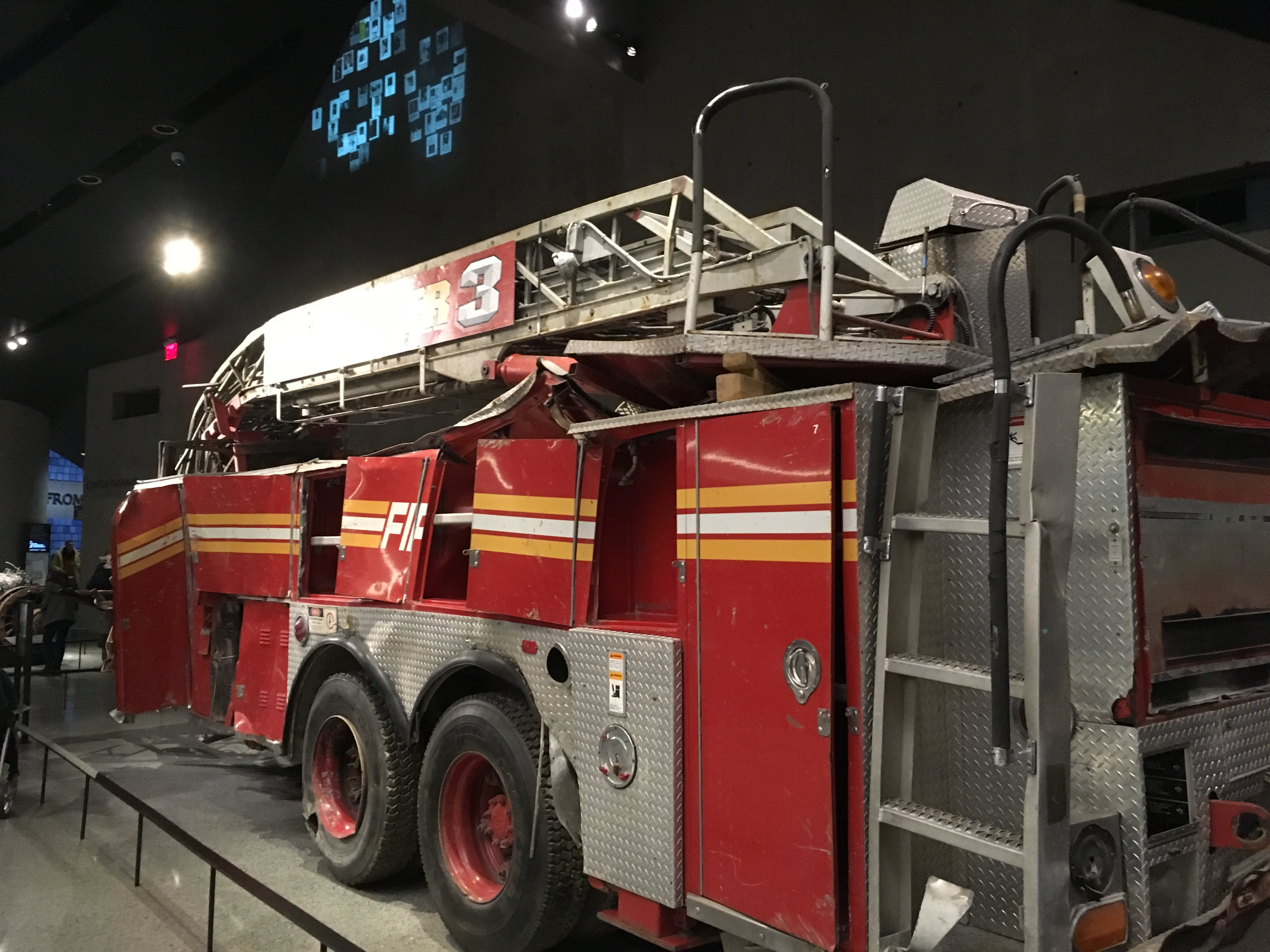
Ladder 3's destroyed ladder truck at its final resting place at the National September 11 Memorial & Museum

In December 2001, an exhibit of photos of Ladder Company 3 taken in the aftermath of the September 11 attacks was displayed at the Portland Museum of Art. The opening of the exhibit was attended by nine firefighters from Ladder Company 3 and a parade was to honor them and those that died. The following year, 60 Minutes II visited Ladder Company 3, speaking with the firefighters left after the September 11 attacks and the new firefighters that were assigned to the company as replacements. One of the firefighters interviewed was Mike Moran, who was off duty during the September 11 attacks and got caught in traffic trying to drive from his home in Rockaway Beach to the World Trade Center site. During The Concert for New York City held at Madison Square Garden on October 20, 2001, Moran had spoken to the audience, explaining that his brother and 12 members of Ladder 3 were killed on 9/11, and that the victims would not be forgotten.

In 2013, firefighters from Ladder Company 3 built a wooden simulation structure on the rooftop of the fire house, consisting of a 12-foot (3.7 m) wall and a window, which is used to practice performing rescues. The lumber used to construct the training equipment was purchased using a grant received from two insurance companies, which also enabled the purchase of new fitness equipment for the gym in the basement of the fire house. Ladder Company 3 was nominated for the award by the Gramercy Park Block Association as a tribute to the men from the fire house killed during the September 11 attacks.
