= Oona Hart =

American model and actress

- Born: Evanston, Illinois
- Occupations: Film, television actress, model

Oona Hart is a model and actress from Evanston, Illinois. She played Lynette in Vanilla Sky (2001) and also had appearances in the TV series Sliders and the film Love Jones. She is well known for her Levi's jeans ad in which she is chased into a tree by a dog. Oona and her husband, Danny Timmins homeschool their kids.
