= Driving Rain =

Studio album by Paul McCartney
- Released: 11 November 2001
- Recorded: 16 February–20 October 2001
- Studios: Henson, Hollywood, California
- Genre: Rock
- Length: 67:08
- Label: Parlophone
- Producer: David Kahne

Paul McCartney chronology
Wingspan: Hits and History (2001)	Driving Rain (2001)	Back in the U.S. (2002)

Paul McCartney studio album chronology
Run Devil Run (1999)	Driving Rain (2001)	Chaos and Creation in the Backyard (2005)

Singles from Driving Rain
- 1. "From a Lover to a Friend" Released: 29 October 2001; 2. "Freedom" Released: 5 November 2001

Driving Rain is the thirteenth solo studio album by the English musician Paul McCartney, released on 11 November 2001 as a double LP, a single cassette, and single CD.

== Background ==
Following the example of Run Devil Run's brisk production schedule, Driving Rain – except for two songs – was cut with David Kahne producing in two weeks, starting in February 2001. McCartney called on musicians who were scheduled to back him on tour.

== Album cover ==
The cover of the album features a photograph taken with a Casio wristwatch containing a built-in camera.

== Music and lyrics ==
"Back in the Sunshine Again" was co-written by McCartney and his son James. On 11 September 2001, McCartney was sitting on a plane in New York City when the terrorist attacks occurred, and was able to witness the events from his seat. Incensed at the tragedy and determined to respond, he composed "Freedom" and helped organise The Concert for New York City, a large all-star show at Madison Square Garden on 20 October.

The songs "About You" and "Heather" were written for his then-wife, Heather Mills, as thanks for helping McCartney grieve the death of his first wife, Linda.

== Release and reception ==
Professional ratings
Aggregate scores
Source	Rating
Metacritic	75/100
Review scores
Source	Rating
AllMusic	4/5 stars
Blender	4/5 stars
Dotmusic	3.5/5 stars
Drowned in Sound	7/10
The Encyclopedia of Popular Music	2/5 stars
Entertainment Weekly	B
Mojo	4.5/5 stars
NME	6/10
Rolling Stone	4/5 stars
Spin	7/10

In November 2001, Driving Rain was released to generally strong reviews but poor sales. The album sold 66,000 copies in its first week in the US. Driving Rain peaked at number 46 in the UK, and became McCartney's lowest-selling album in his homeland. The US reaction was a little stronger, with the album peaking at number 26 and being certified Gold by the RIAA.

McCartney halted the pressing of Driving Rain so that "Freedom" could appear as a hidden track (since the artwork had already been printed). The just-released "From a Lover to a Friend" (which only reached number 45 in the UK) was repackaged with "Freedom", although the single failed to re-chart.

According to the review aggregator Metacritic, the album received "generally favorable reviews" based on a weighted average score of 75 out of 100 from 12 critic scores.

Reviewing the album for Uncut magazine, Ian MacDonald commented on McCartney's spontaneous approach to its recording, saying that "In parts (for example, the lengthy closer 'Rinse The Raindrops'), the results are almost ferocious, coming as close to a McCartney-esque Tin Machine as one could reasonably imagine." MacDonald considered the more "polished and produced" tracks to be "the most successful", however, and concluded: "Possibly a grower, this album is certainly better than anything Macca's done for some while, if not the late masterpiece some of us have been hoping for." Fox News commentator Roger Friedman remarked that the chorus of the song "Tiny Bubble" is "remarkably" similar to "Piggies", written by George Harrison and released on the Beatles' 1968 self-titled double album (also known as the "White Album").

McCartney opened his tour in support of the album in April 2002. Titled the Driving USA tour, it was a commercial success, with extensions being added to the itinerary around the world. Four of the album's sixteen songs were performed: "Lonely Road", "Your Loving Flame", "Freedom" and the title track. "From a Lover to a Friend" was also performed at the Concert for New York City on October 20, 2001.

== Track listing ==
All tracks are written by Paul McCartney, except "Spinning on an Axis" and "Back in the Sunshine Again" co-written by James McCartney.

Driving Rain track listing
No.	Title	Length
1.	"Lonely Road"	3:16
2.	"From a Lover to a Friend"	3:48
3.	"She's Given Up Talking"	4:57
4.	"Driving Rain"	3:26
5.	"I Do"	2:56
6.	"Tiny Bubble"	4:21
7.	"Magic"	3:59
8.	"Your Way"	2:55
9.	"Spinning on an Axis"	5:16
10.	"About You"	2:54
11.	"Heather"	3:26
12.	"Back in the Sunshine Again"	4:21
13.	"Your Loving Flame"	3:43
14.	"Riding into Jaipur"	4:08
15.	"Rinse the Raindrops"	10:08
16.	"Freedom"	3:34
Total length:		67:08

Note: "Freedom" is unlisted on the album sleeve.

== Personnel ==
Personnel per booklet.

Musicians

- Paul McCartney – bass guitar, acoustic guitar, electric guitar, classical guitar, vocals, Ludwig Drums, Fender Rhodes electric piano, knee slaps, percussion, piano
- Abe Laboriel Jr. – drums, tambourine, Roland electronic percussion, Ludwig drums, DW drums, electronic drums, backing vocals, African drum samples, accordion
- Rusty Anderson – electric guitar, pedal steel guitar, acoustic guitar, 12-string electric guitar, Vox Bass Guitar, backing vocals, percussion, tampura
- Gabe Dixon – Wurlitzer electric piano, piano, Hammond organ, Fender Rhodes, backing vocals
- David Kahne – Roland organ, electric guitar, synths, orchestral samples, Wurlitzer, sampled strings
- James McCartney – percussion, electric guitar
- Ralph Morrison – violin
- String quartet:
  - David Campbell – viola
  - Matt Funes – viola
  - Joel Derouin – violin
  - Larry Corbett – cello
- Eric Clapton – guitar on track 16

Production

- David Leonard – mixing
- David Kahne – producer
- Paul McCartney – executive producer
- Mark Dearnley – engineer
- Jaime Sickora – assistant engineer
- Kevin Mills – 2nd assistant engineer
- Geoff Emerick, Paul Hicks – additional engineers
- Mark Dearnley, David Kahne – mixing
- Stephen Marcussen – mastering
- Stewart Whitmore – digital editing
- Norman Hathaway with Micha Weidmann, Donat Raetzo – design
- Paul McCartney, Heather Mills – photos

== Charts and certifications ==
=== Weekly charts ===
Chart (2001)	Peak position
Austrian Albums Chart	31
Canadian Albums Chart	33
Danish Albums Chart	17
Dutch Mega Albums Chart	76
French SNEP Albums Chart	33
German Media Control Albums Chart	23
Italian Albums Chart	17
Japanese Oricon Albums Chart	27
Norwegian VG-lista Albums Chart	18
Swedish Albums Chart	19
Swiss Albums Chart	62
UK Albums Chart	46
US Billboard 200	26

=== Certifications and sales ===
Region	Certification	Certified units/sales
Canada (Nielsen SoundScan)	—	20,000
Japan (Oricon Charts)	—	17,560
United Kingdom (BPI)	Silver	60,000^{^}
United States (RIAA)	Gold	399,000
Summaries
Worldwide	—	650,000
^{^} Shipments figures based on certification alone.
