= The Concert for New York City =

2001 benefit concert

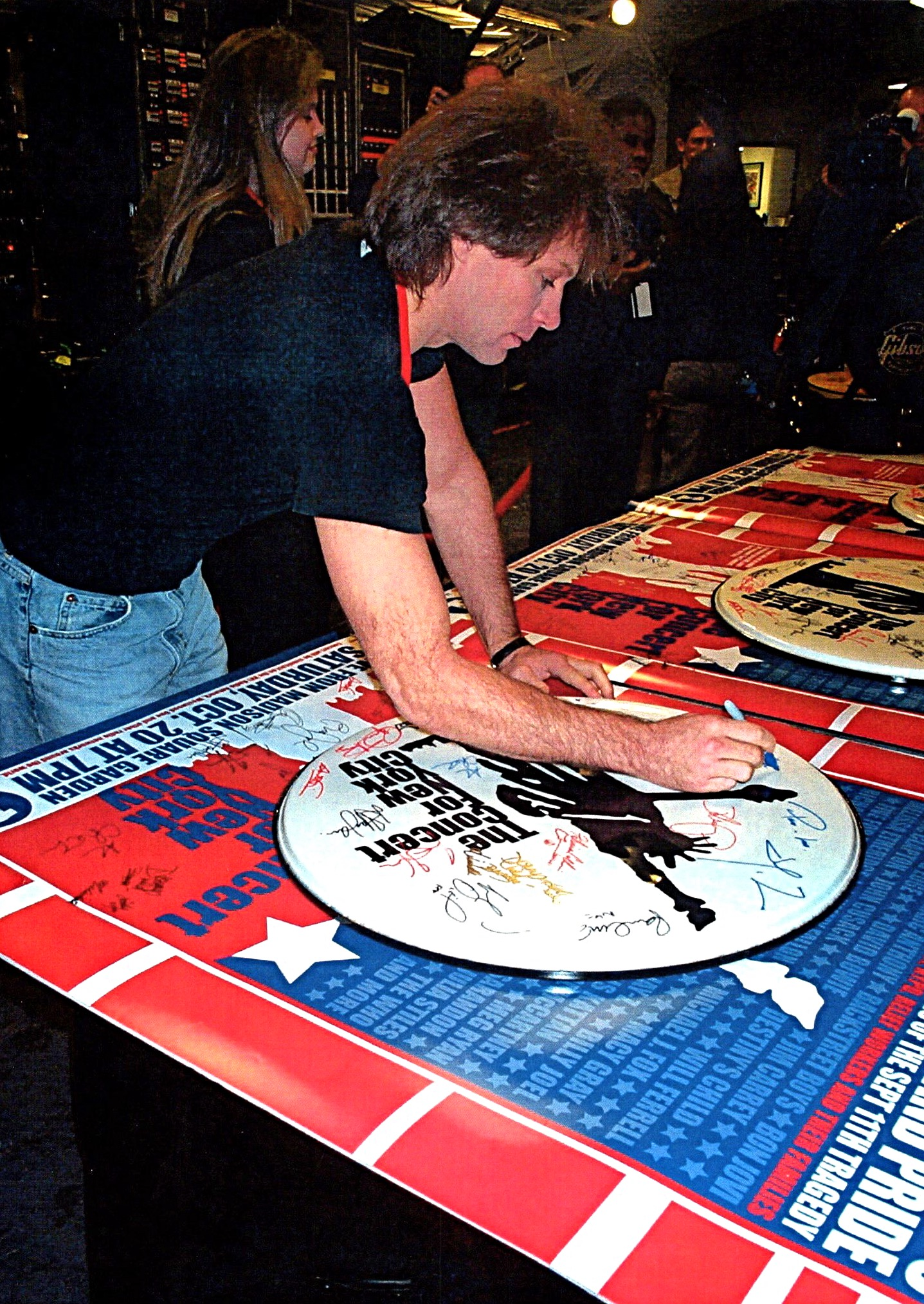
- Jon Bon Jovi signing drumhead
- Genre: Benefit concert
- Dates: October 20, 2001
- Locations: Madison Square Garden, New York City, U.S.
- Founders: Paul McCartney

The Concert for New York City was a benefit concert that took place at Madison Square Garden in New York City in response to the September 11 attacks. Aside from performing for charity, the concert honored the first responders from the New York City Fire Department and New York City Police Department, their families, and those lost in the attacks and those who had worked in the ongoing rescue and recovery efforts in the weeks since that time.

The concert was organized by Paul McCartney and included many legendary British contemporaries, including The Who, David Bowie, Elton John, Eric Clapton, and Rolling Stones bandmates Mick Jagger and Keith Richards. American artists included Bon Jovi, Jay-Z, Destiny's Child, the Backstreet Boys, James Taylor, Billy Joel, Melissa Etheridge, Five for Fighting, Goo Goo Dolls, John Mellencamp with Kid Rock, and a humorous performance by Adam Sandler as "Operaman". Paul Shaffer acted as musical director for the show and various celebrities and political figures including Howard Stern and Rudy Giuliani appeared between the acts.

Many athletes also appeared between the acts including Joe Torre, whose Yankees were on their way to competing in their fourth consecutive World Series. The concert also included several short films made by New York City's most notable filmmakers such as Woody Allen, Martin Scorsese, Spike Lee, and Kevin Smith.

Over 60 stars that participated in the concert signed unique memorabilia backstage at Madison Square Garden that were later auctioned off to support the Robin Hood Foundation. The autographed items included three large posters of the concert and three customized 24" drumheads. Other items included a complete drumset and guitar.

== Audience reaction ==
Much of the crowd itself was extremely emotional, with victims' families and colleagues holding up portraits of the dead. Three speakers were booed: actress Susan Sarandon (for plugging New York mayoralty candidate Mark Green), actor Richard Gere (for speaking about non-violent tolerance), and Hillary Clinton (for her perceived anti-police views). Gere acknowledged the crowd's jeering at his pacifist stance, stating, "That's apparently unpopular right now, but that's all right." Sarandon nearly fell when she was intentionally tripped by the wife of a missing police officer, whose foot came through the barricade fence.

Adam Sandler's appearance as Operaman was a comic highlight of the evening. He sang a humorous song about the greatness of New York City, the end of Rudy Giuliani's term as mayor, the New York Yankees who were in the middle of playing in the 2001 ALCS, the musical acts that preceded him on stage (in which he mentioned that Destiny's Child gave him a "bone-ah"), and Osama bin Laden's alleged cowardice, including the line "Osama says he's tough, Osama says he's brave/Then tell me why Osama is shitting in a cave!"

Musically, the audience responded most fervently to the Who, roaring as they came on stage with a roiling "Who Are You", drowning out the band on the famous "It's only teenage wasteland" refrain of "Baba O'Riley", and reaching a peak of excitement with "Won't Get Fooled Again". The backdrop for the band consisted of an American flag alongside a British flag, showing solidarity. Vocalist Roger Daltrey's final words to the crowd of first responders and their families were: "We could never follow what you did." Previously, during the opening chords of "Behind Blue Eyes", Daltrey said, "I'm not worthy of wearing this," when tossed a law enforcement officer's cap. Forbes described the Who's performance as a "catharsis" for the law enforcement in attendance. This performance would turn out to be bassist John Entwistle's final performance in America with the Who; he died of a heart attack only eight months later. Multi-instrumentalist Jon Carin, who had worked with the band during the group's 1996–1997 tours, played keyboards in place of longtime keyboardist John "Rabbit" Bundrick.

Other highlights included David Bowie's opening tandem of Paul Simon's "America" and his own "Heroes". New York's own Billy Joel's "Miami 2017 (Seen the Lights Go Out on Broadway)" where Joel says after singing it, "I wrote that song 25 years ago, I thought it was gonna be a science fiction song. I never thought it would really happen. But unlike the end of that song...we ain't going anywhere!" Elton John's sentimental "Mona Lisas and Mad Hatters" was also well-received, among other performances. After the Who's performance, FDNY firefighter Mike Moran spoke to the audience, explaining that his brother, 12 of his fellow members from Ladder 3 and others from his neighborhood of Rockaway Beach were killed on 9/11, and that the victims would not be forgotten. He ended by saying "In the spirit of the Irish people, Osama bin Laden, you can kiss my royal, Irish ass!" which was met with wild cheering and applause. Moran removed his cap and concluded with, "I live in Rockaway, and this is my face, bitch!" which was, again, met with cheers from the crowd.

When Pete Townshend and Roger Daltrey, the two surviving members of the Who, were given the Kennedy Center Honors in December 2008 for their contributions to American culture, a tribute performance of "Baba O'Riley" was delivered by Rob Thomas. In the end refrain of "teenage wasteland", a full choir of FDNY firemen was revealed behind a curtain – bellowing the refrain – in gratitude for the Who's performance at The Concert for New York City, seven years prior.

== Lineup and songs ==
In order of appearance:

- David Bowie – Performance: "America", "Heroes"
- Billy Crystal – Comedy Routine
- Tom Daschle – Speech
- Bon Jovi – Performance: "Livin' on a Prayer", "Wanted Dead or Alive", "It's My Life"
- Mark Wahlberg – Introducing Jay-Z
- Jay-Z – Performance: "Izzo (H.O.V.A.)"
- Goo Goo Dolls – Performance: "American Girl", "Iris"
- Susan Sarandon – Speech
- Leonardo DiCaprio and Robert De Niro – Introducing a Martin Scorsese short film
- Martin Scorsese – Short film: "The Neighborhood" (feat. Little Italy)
- Billy Joel – Performance: "Miami 2017 (Seen the Lights Go Out on Broadway)", "New York State of Mind"
- Will Ferrell – (as President George W. Bush) – Comedy Routine: On The Taliban
- Chris Kattan – Introducing Destiny's Child
- Destiny's Child – Performance: "Emotion", "Walk With Me (Gospel Medley)"
- Harrison Ford – Thank you to Sponsors, Introducing Eric Clapton
- Eric Clapton and Buddy Guy – Performance: "Hoochie Coochie Man", "Everything's Gonna Be Alright"
- Christy Turlington – Introducing an Edward Burns short film
- Edward Burns – Short film: "Lovely Day"
- James Lipton – Introducing Adam Sandler as Operaman
- Adam Sandler – (as Operaman) – Sings Operaman
- Meg Ryan – Introducing the Backstreet Boys
- Backstreet Boys – Performance: "Quit Playing Games (with My Heart)"
- David Spade – Introducing Melissa Etheridge
- Melissa Etheridge – Performance: "Come to My Window", "Born to Run"
- Halle Berry – Introducing a Spike Lee short film
- Spike Lee – Short film: "Come Rain or Come Shine" (feat. the New York Yankees and fans)
- John Cusack – Introducing The Who
- The Who – Performance: "Who Are You", "Baba O'Riley", "Behind Blue Eyes", "Won't Get Fooled Again"
- George Pataki – Speech
- John Cusack – Introducing a Woody Allen short film
- Woody Allen – Short film: "Sounds from the Town I Love" (feat. 20+ known screen & stage actors)
- Mike Myers – Introducing Mick Jagger and Keith Richards
- Mick Jagger and Keith Richards – Performance: "Salt of the Earth", "Miss You"
- Howard Stern – Introducing the short film "I'm a New Yorker" (edited by Ernie Fritz)
- Julia Stiles – Introducing Macy Gray
- Macy Gray – Performance: "With a Little Help from My Friends"
- Hillary Clinton – Introducing a Jerry Seinfeld short film
- Christian Charles – Short film: "The Greatest City on Earth" (starring Jerry Seinfeld)
- Bill Clinton – Introducing James Taylor
- James Taylor – Performance: "Fire and Rain", "Up on the Roof"
- Michael J. Fox – Introducing Rudy Giuliani
- Rudy Giuliani – Speech
- Jimmy Fallon – 80's Hits to "You Can't Touch This" and "Come On Eileen"(snippet)
- Jon Bon Jovi – Introducing a Kevin Smith short film
- Kevin Smith – Short film: "Why I Love New #$%&@ York" (feat. opinions of Jersey)
- John Mellencamp – Performance: "Peaceful World"
- John Mellencamp and Kid Rock – Performance: "Pink Houses"
- Hilary Swank – Introducing Five for Fighting
- Five For Fighting – Performance: "Superman (It's Not Easy)"
- Janet Jackson – Performance: "Together Again" (Remote Telecast)
- Natalie Portman – Introducing Elton John
- Elton John – Performance: "I Want Love", "Mona Lisas and Mad Hatters"
- Elton John and Billy Joel – Performance: "Your Song"
- Richard Gere – Introducing a Ric Burns short film
- Ric Burns – Short film: "New York: A Documentary Film"
- Jim Carrey – Introducing Paul McCartney
- Paul McCartney – Performance: "I'm Down", "Lonely Road", "From a Lover to a Friend", "Yesterday", "Freedom" (new song), "Let It Be" and "Freedom" (reprise)

== Short films ==
The following short films were shown during the concert, here sorted by director:

- Woody Allen – Sounds from a Town I Love
- Edward Burns – Lovely Day
- Ric Burns – New York: A Documentary Film
- Christian Charles – The Greatest City on Earth
- Spike Lee – Come Rain or Come Shine
- Martin Scorsese – The Neighborhood
- Kevin Smith – Why I Love New #*$%!&@ York

=== Sounds from a Town I Love ===
Sounds from a Town I Love (sometimes incorrectly referred to as Sounds from the Town I Love) is a 2001 comedy short film of approximately three minutes, written and directed by Woody Allen. The film was first shown during The Concert for New York City. The film consists purely of cell-phone conversation snippets of twenty-three random people walking through the streets of New York City. Ranging from complainers to neurotic worriers conversing about bizarre or amusing situations, they and their comments are unrelated to one another. The film ends with a message from Woody Allen: "I love this town."

John Cusack introduced the film with a message from Woody Allen: "I apologize in advance for my short movie. The cause was so worthwhile that I could not say no when approached to contribute something to this wonderful show. I did the best I could. If you hate it, I will try to make it up to you somehow in the future." In addition to longtime Allen collaborators Marshall Brickman and Tony Roberts, among the people seen in the film are Austin Pendleton, Griffin Dunne, Michael Emerson, Bebe Neuwirth, and Celia Weston.

== Critical reaction ==
In 2004, Rolling Stone magazine selected this concert, along with the earlier America: A Tribute to Heroes telethon, as one of the 50 moments that changed rock and roll. It was also voted the No. 4 greatest moment in the history of Madison Square Garden. On December 7, 2008, Pete Townshend and Roger Daltrey of the Who received Kennedy Center Honors from the President of the United States, and after several musicians performed their music, the finale was a surprise chorus of New York City police officers and rescue personnel who had been touched by their performance.

== Broadcast ==
The concert was broadcast live on VH1, and over $35 million was raised. An additional $275,000 was also raised with a connecting auction. All proceeds of the Concert for New York City and related projects went to the Robin Hood Relief Fund, which was established by the Robin Hood Foundation to help victims of the World Trade Center attacks. The five-hour broadcast was executive produced by Greg Sills and Fred Graver. The producer was Paul Flattery and the director was Louis J. Horvitz (who has directed many of the Academy Award broadcasts). It was written by Stephen Pouliot and Paul Flattery. The concert was recorded by David Hewitt and Mark Repp on Remote Recording's Silver Truck. It was nominated for two Primetime Emmy Awards for Outstanding Variety, Music or Comedy Special, and Outstanding Art Direction for a Variety or Music Program (by SNL vet Keith Raywood). The entire uncut version of the 5 1/2 hour concert was rebroadcast on VH1 Classic on January 1, 2008.

A one-hour highlight show was broadcast on CBS the following month. An album and DVD of the event were released in January 2002. An encore of the entire concert ran on September 11, 2011, to commemorate the 10th anniversary of the attacks, commercial-free and unedited, from 4 to 10 pm. Another encore of the concert aired on October 20, 2021, on MTV Classic and MTV Live in celebration of the 20th anniversary of the concert, commercial free. Another encore for the concert aired on October 20, 2026 on MTV, MTV2, VH1, and Logo TV in celebration of the 25th anniversary of the concert, commercial free.

== CD release ==
A double CD of the event was released by Sony on November 27, 2001, containing 32 tracks. The compilation has not been available on streaming and digital services, as of 2024.

=== Disc one ===
1. "America" – David Bowie
2. "Heroes" – David Bowie
3. "Livin' on a Prayer" – Bon Jovi
4. "Wanted Dead Or Alive" – Bon Jovi
5. "It's My Life" – Bon Jovi
6. "Izzo (H.O.V.A.)" – Jay-Z
7. "American Girl" – Goo Goo Dolls
8. "Miami 2017" – Billy Joel
9. "New York State of Mind" – Billy Joel
10. "Emotion" – Destiny's Child
11. "Gospel Medley" – Destiny's Child
12. "I'm Your Hoochie Coochie Man" – Eric Clapton & Buddy Guy
13. "Operaman" – Adam Sandler
14. "Quit Playing Games With My Heart" – Backstreet Boys
15. "Miss You" – Mick Jagger and Keith Richards
16. "Salt of the Earth" – Mick Jagger and Keith Richards

=== Disc two ===
1. "FDNY" – Mike Moran
2. "Who Are You" – The Who
3. "Baba O'Riley" – The Who
4. "Won't Get Fooled Again" – The Who
5. "Come to My Window" – Melissa Etheridge
6. "Born to Run" – Melissa Etheridge
7. "Fire and Rain" – James Taylor
8. "Up on the Roof" – James Taylor
9. "Peaceful World" – John Mellencamp
10. "Pink Houses" – John Mellencamp and Kid Rock
11. "Superman (It's Not Easy)" – Five for Fighting
12. "Mona Lisas and Mad Hatters" – Elton John
13. "I'm Down" – Paul McCartney
14. "Yesterday" – Paul McCartney
15. "Let It Be" – Paul McCartney
16. "Freedom" (reprise) – Paul McCartney

== Home video release ==
The concert was released by Sony both on DVD and VHS on January 29, 2002, both only in NTSC format for the US/Canadian market. The two-tape VHS set has a total running time of 296 minutes, while the double DVD runs a shorter time of 245 minutes.

== Charts ==
=== Weekly charts ===
Chart (2001)	Peak position
US Billboard 200	27

=== Year-end charts ===
Chart (2002)	Position
US Billboard 200	181

== See also ==
- America: A Tribute to Heroes
- Come Together: A Night for John Lennon's Words and Music, a New York charity concert in October 2001 which became largely a tribute to New York in the wake of 9/11
- List of highest-grossing benefit concerts
- The September Concert
- The Who Tours and Performances
- United We Stand: What More Can I Give
