= Patrick J. Brown =

American firefighter (1952–2001)

- Born: Patrick John Brown; November 9, 1952; Oak Park, Illinois, U.S.
- Died: September 11, 2001 (aged 48); North Tower, World Trade Center, New York City, U.S.
- Cause of death: Collapse of 1 World Trade Center during the September 11 attacks
- Other name: Paddy Brown
- Occupation: Fire captain
- Years active: 1977–2001
- Military career
- Allegiance: United States
- Branch: U. S. Marine Corps
- Service years: 1969–1973
- Unit: 3rd CEB
- Wars: Vietnam War

Patrick John Brown (November 9, 1952 – September 11, 2001) was an American fire captain who served in the New York City Fire Department and a Marine Corps veteran of the Vietnam War. He and his team perished during the September 11 attacks, while trying to rescue people in the North Tower of the World Trade Center. During his service in Vietnam, he was a tunnel rat and attained the rank of sergeant.

== Early life ==
Patrick John Brown was born on November 9, 1952 in Oak Park, Illinois. His father was an FBI agent, and the year after Patrick was born his family relocated to Queens Village, Queens in New York City as a result of his father being transferred. Patrick was the oldest of three siblings; his brother Michael was one year younger and his sister Carolyn was born eleven years after him.

Patrick became interested in firefighting as a child, visiting the New York City Fire Department (FDNY) fire station in his neighborhood to talk to firefighters and riding his bicycle to fire calls that he heard about from a radio scanner he kept in his bedroom. As a teenager, Patrick joined the Boy Scouts of America's Explorer Post that introduced major aspects of the fire service to participants. He later joined the New York Fire Patrol and was assigned to Fire Patrol 1 on West 30th Street in Midtown Manhattan.

In 1969, Brown enlisted in the United States Marine Corps and had to obtain the signed consent of his father because he was only 17 years old. He disliked his initial role as a clerk and petitioned for a change, obtaining a reassignment to the 3d Combat Engineer Battalion. Brown served two tours of duty in Vietnam, operating as a tunnel rat. He attained the rank of sergeant and was awarded the Combat Action Ribbon and Vietnam Service Medal.

== Career ==
In 1973, Brown rejoined the New York Fire Patrol after his discharge from the Marine Corps. He took up boxing as a sport, working out at Gleason's Gym near his assignment at Fire Patrol 1 and contended in the Golden Gloves. He joined the FDNY in 1977 and was assigned to Ladder Company 26 in Harlem.

During the 1980s, Brown was awarded five medals on the FDNY's annual Medal Day events, one for a meritorious act while he was working at Ladder Company 26 and four for meritorious acts during his time at Rescue Company 2 (following his transfer to Brooklyn in 1983).

On May 14, 1991, Brown was in command of Rescue Company 1 when he improvised a plan to perform two rope rescues at a fire in a 12-story building in Times Square. Using firefighters lying on the roof to anchor the rope line because there were no physical objects that it could be tied to, two occupants were safely rescued from the windows of the top floor in front of television cameras and hundreds of onlookers on the street below. The roof rescue was featured in the television series Rescue 911 (Episode 3.10).

In March 1992, Brown spoke out against proposed budget cuts to the FDNY during a television interview with Penny Crone on Channel 5, saying that Mayor David Dinkins should talk to firefighters before making decisions on cuts to the budget, inviting Dinkins to visit his firehouse. He was temporarily transferred to a desk job for three days as punishment before returning to Rescue Company 1.

Brown was promoted to the rank of captain in 1993 and was assigned to Engine Company 69 on 143rd Street in Harlem the following year. In 2000, he transferred to Ladder Company 3 on 13th Street in the East Village, which was located near his apartment in Stuyvesant Town.

=== September 11 attacks ===
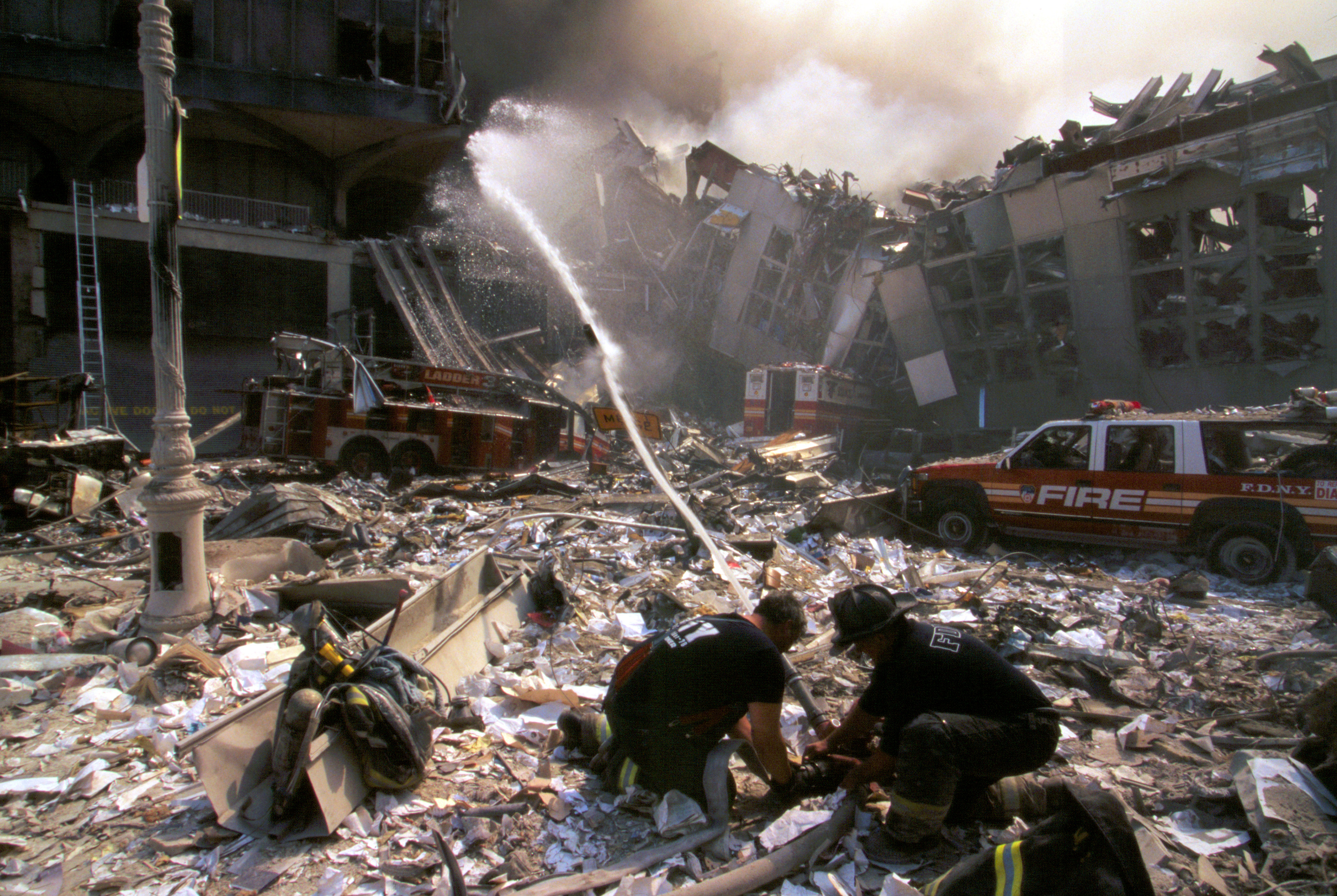
The truck from Ladder 3 at the World Trade Center site on September 11, 2001

On September 11, 2001, Brown arrived at Ladder Company 3 at 8:00 am to report for duty. The first plane struck the North Tower of the World Trade Center about 45 minutes later, as the firefighters from the overnight shift were going off duty. The truck from Ladder Company 3 reported to the World Trade Center site carrying firefighters from both shifts, parking on West Street near Vesey Street, and Brown proceeded to climb Stairwell B in the North Tower along with the men from his company. He was not captured on the footage filmed by Jules Naudet near the command center in the lobby, as it was believed that he proceeded directly to the stairwell. Captain Jay Jonas of Ladder Company 6, who first met Brown that morning, said Paddy told him, "Jay, don't even bother reporting in. They are just going to send you upstairs."

Upon reaching the 35th floor, Brown found a working telephone and called the dispatcher to give a report on the situation and asked to relay his message to the command post in the lobby. He concluded the phone call by saying, "Three Truck and we are still heading up. Okay? Thank you." After the South Tower collapsed, Ladder Company 3 and Ladder Company 6 were instructed to evacuate the building. Brown's last words were recorded in a radio transmission as saying, "This is the officer of Ladder Co. 3. I refuse the order! I am on the 44th floor and we have too many burned people with me. I am not leaving them!" He and his team perished when the North Tower collapsed.

== Legacy ==
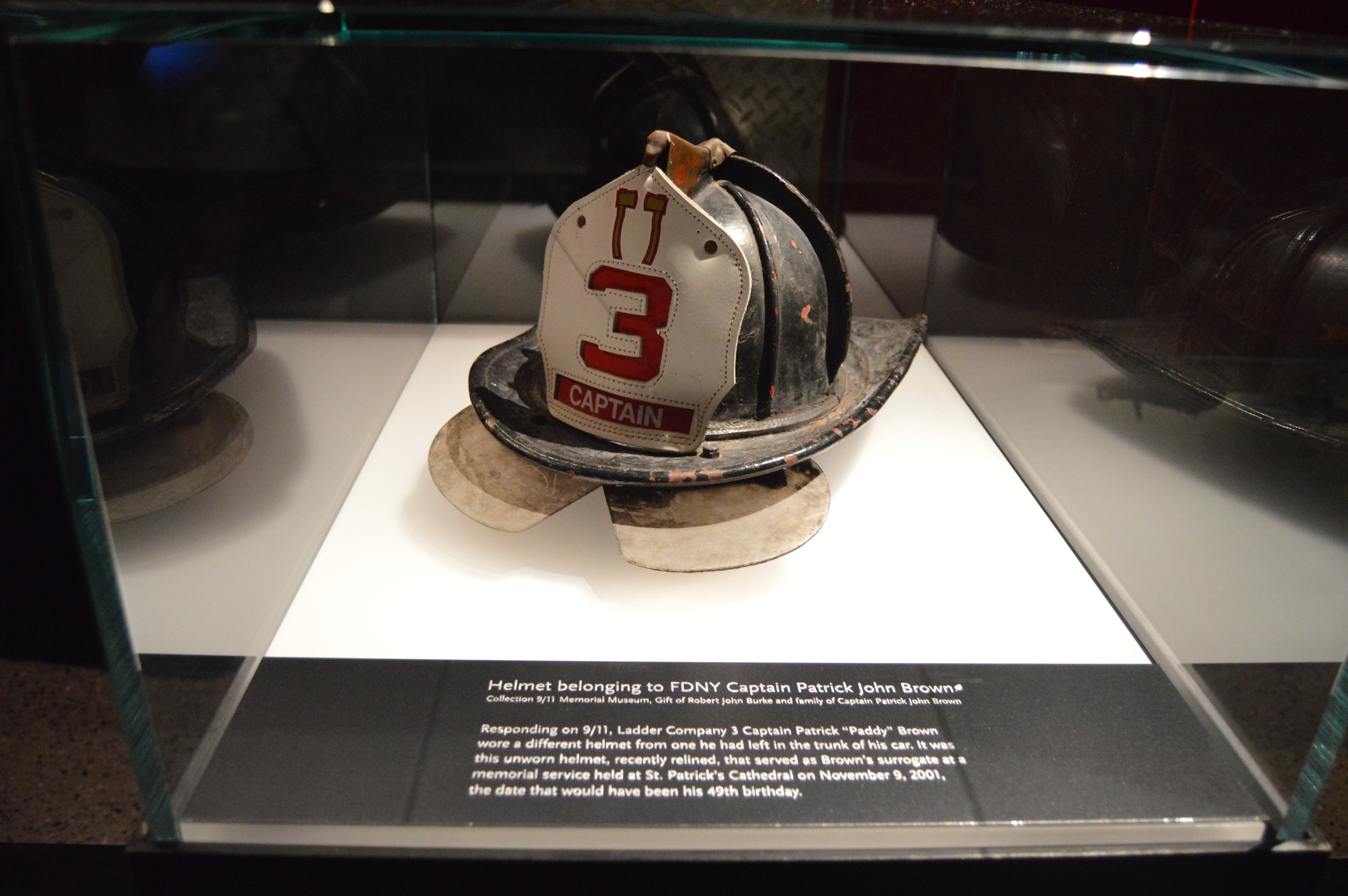
Helmet belonging to Captain Brown on display at the September 11 Museum

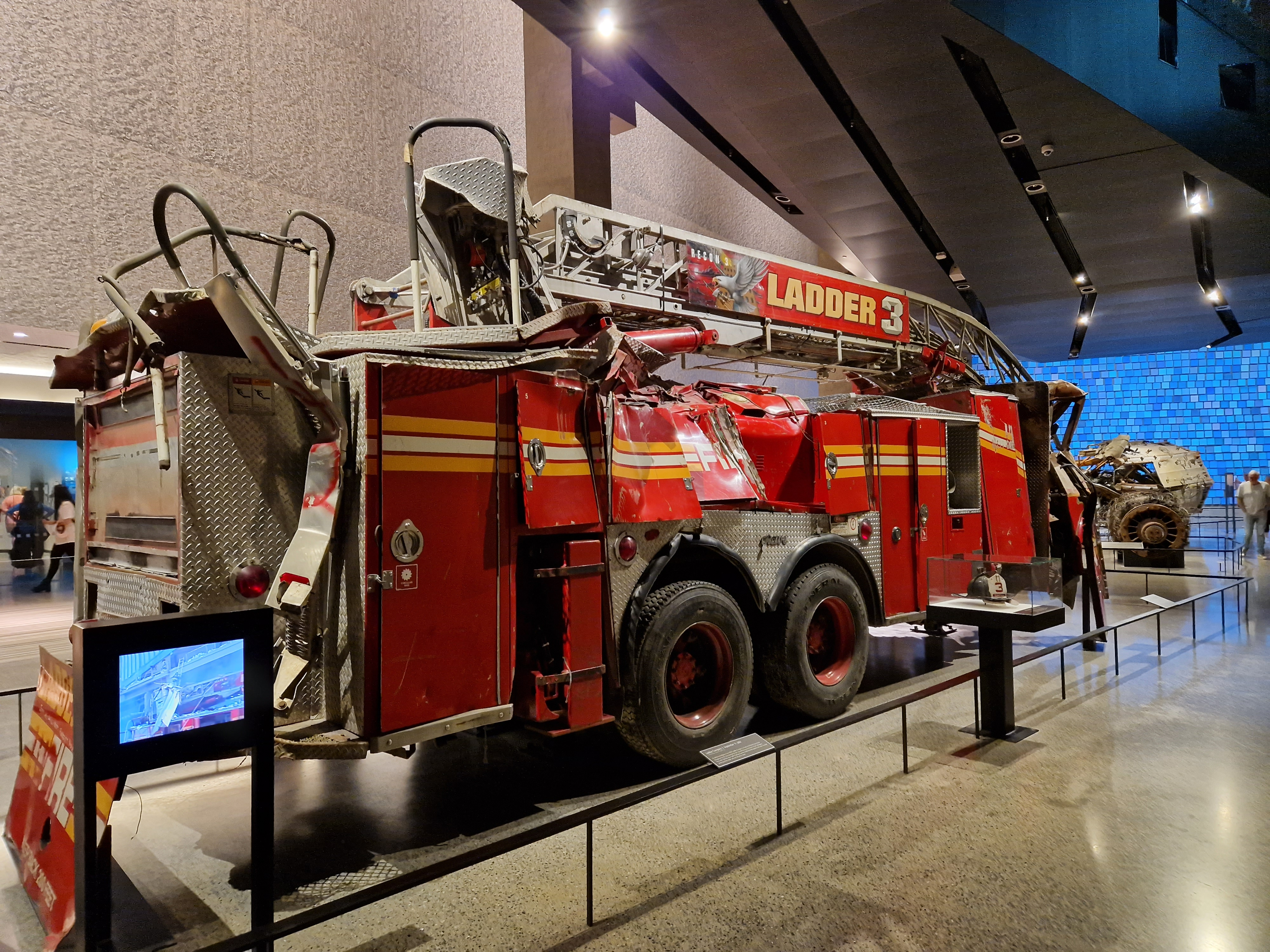
Truck from Ladder 3 on display at the September 11 Museum

Brown's remains were recovered from the rubble of the North Tower on December 14, 2001. Later that month, his ashes were spread along a path he often jogged on in Central Park, at a spot near the Great Lawn he had marked on a map. The map was included in a letter to Patrick's brother kept in his locker at Ladder Company 3 and was intended to be opened in the event of his death.

In 2002, the portion of the East River Greenway running between 14th and 18th streets in Manhattan was named the Captain Patrick J. Brown Walk. That walk is located near the apartment where he resided in Stuyvesant Town.

Brown's life and times were the subject of the 2006 film Finding Paddy. The documentary was directed by Steve McCarthy, a news producer who first met Brown in the early 1990s following his double rope rescues in Times Square and later filmed a story for Dateline about how Brown was caring for the widow and family of Captain John Drennan, who had served as Brown's mentor in the FDNY and died after being injured in a fire. The following year, Brown's former girlfriend Sharon Watts compiled a collection of articles, interviews and messages in her book Miss You, Pat.

In 2010, Michael Brown wrote What Brothers Do in honor of his brother Patrick. Before he became a medical doctor and a member of Urban Search and Rescue Nevada Task Force 1, Michael spent four years as a firefighter with the FDNY. With flights grounded after the September 11th attacks, he drove from Las Vegas to New York City and joined rescue workers at Ground Zero to searching for his brother and other missing firefighters. Jennifer Murphy's 2022 book First Responder tells the story of Patrick and Michael, who ultimately succumbed to 9/11-related cancer.

At the National September 11 Memorial & Museum, Brown is memorialized at the South Pool, on Panel S-8, along with other first responders. His name was placed next to the other firefighters from Ladder Company 3 and above Captain Terence Hatton from Rescue Company 1, a close friend. The damaged remains of the fire truck that carried Brown and the other men of Ladder Company 3 to the World Trade Center site is on display at the museum; it was lowered into the exhibition space during a ceremony on July 20, 2011. A helmet belonging to Captain Brown is also displayed at the museum.
