= Freedom (Paul McCartney song) =

Song by Paul McCartney

Single by Paul McCartney

from the album Driving Rain
- B-side: "From a Lover to a Friend"
- Released: 5 November 2001
- Recorded: 20 October 2001 (live); 23 October 2001 (overdubs)
- Studio: Quad (New York)
- Venue: Madison Square Garden (New York)
- Genre: Rock
- Length: 3:34
- Label: Capitol
- Songwriter: Paul McCartney
- Producer: David Kahne

Paul McCartney singles chronology
| "From a Lover to a Friend" (2001) | "Freedom" (2001) | "Vanilla Sky" (2001) |

"Freedom" is a song written and recorded by Paul McCartney in response to the September 11 attacks in 2001. McCartney was in New York City at the time of the attacks and witnessed the event while sitting in a plane parked on the tarmac at New York's John F. Kennedy International Airport.

== Background ==
I witnessed the last moments of the World Trade Center twin towers. Out of the window of the plane I could see the towers smoking and in flames and, like everybody, I could not believe what was happening.

— Paul McCartney

In February 2001, McCartney began recording his twelfth studio album, Driving Rain, with a set of new musicians he intended to back him on a forthcoming tour, his first since The New World Tour in 1993. By September 2001, the album was finished and ready to be released that November, with the song "From a Lover to a Friend" chosen as the first single for a planned release in October.

On 11 September 2001, McCartney was sitting in a plane parked on the tarmac at John F. Kennedy International Airport in New York when the terrorist attacks occurred, and was able to witness the events from his seat. In an immediate response to the tragedy, it was announced that the proceeds from the "From a Lover to a Friend" single would be donated to aid the families of New York firemen.

At the same time, McCartney became heavily involved in organising The Concert for New York City, a massive all star charity show planned to be staged at Madison Square Garden in front of 20,000 people on 20 October. He had also been inspired to quickly write a new song, "Freedom", which he planned to debut at the show.

== Release ==
Due to the strong audience reception after the performance of "Freedom", featuring Eric Clapton on lead guitar with McCartney's touring band, a single with re-recorded studio vocals was rush released to radio a week after the concert. A new retail CD single release was planned for 5 November, as part of a two-song disc with "From a Lover to a Friend", with the earlier version of the single recalled. All proceeds from both singles went to the Robin Hood Foundation, which distributed funds to families of the victims and to New York's emergency workers.

Additionally, Capitol Records decided to halt production of the Driving Rain album in order to include "Freedom" as a bonus track. Due to this last minute change, no mention is made of the song on the CD booklet, as it was too late to reprint it. Instead, it was promoted on a hype sticker affixed to the front of the CD jewel case.

McCartney performed the song at the Super Bowl XXXVI pregame show with a Statue of Liberty tapestry rising up in the background as a tribute to the victims of the terrorist attacks. He was joined on stage by 500 children, each representing the 180 countries who televise the event.

McCartney performed the song frequently on his 2002 Driving USA Tour. A recording of the song from a show in Dallas appeared on the accompanying live album Back in the U.S.. However he chose not to perform it on subsequent tours, such as his 2005 The 'US' Tour, as he felt the song had become "hijacked" and acquired a militaristic meaning due to the George W. Bush administration's war on terror.

== Track listing ==
All tracks are written by Paul McCartney.

| No. | Title | Length |
|---|---|---|
| 1. | "Freedom" (studio mix) | 3:34 |
| 2. | "From a Lover to a Friend" | 3:49 |
| 3. | "From a Lover to a Friend" (David Kahne remix 2) | 5:27 |
| Total length: | | 12:50 |

== Personnel ==
- Paul McCartney – vocals, acoustic guitar, bass guitar
- Rusty Anderson – rhythm guitar
- Eric Clapton – lead guitar
- Abe Laboriel, Jr. – drums

== Charts ==
Chart performance for "Freedom"
| Chart (2001) | Peak position |
|---|---|
| Austria (Ö3 Austria Top 40) | 61 |
| Romania (Romanian Top 100) | 61 |
| US Billboard Hot 100 | 97 |
| US Adult Contemporary (Billboard) | 20 |
