= Vanilla Sky (song) =

2001 single by Paul McCartney

Promotional single by Paul McCartney

from the album Music from Vanilla Sky
- Released: 4 December 2001
- Studio: Henson, Hollywood
- Genre: Folk rock
- Length: 2:46
- Label: Capitol
- Songwriter: Paul McCartney
- Producer: David Kahne

Paul McCartney singles chronology
"Freedom" (2001)	"Vanilla Sky" (2001)	"Tropic Island Hum" (2004)

"Vanilla Sky" is a song written and recorded by Paul McCartney for the 2001 film of the same name.

== Composition and recording ==
McCartney was in Los Angeles working on his album Driving Rain when director Cameron Crowe came by to ask if he would write a song for his new movie.

He showed us about a half-hour of it, and it looked very intriguing, with Tom [Cruise] acting his heart out. I said "What's the title?" He said "Vanilla Sky." I said "Oh, that's a nice title," and immediately you start thinking of rhymes with sky, fly… You know, it starts to kick off into something [that] doesn't look too difficult.

- Paul McCartney

McCartney says he got inspiration from a waiter in a restaurant:

Before the first course, he brought something we hadn't ordered. He said "Here's amuse-bouche". I said, "What is he talking about? Moozy booshy?" My limited knowledge of French, I kind of worked out that he meant like a sort of palate pleaser, or amuse your mouth, or something. So that became the first line of the song, "The chef prepares a special menu." It was gonna be "The chef prepares amuse-bouche," but I could never even pronounce [that], let alone [have it] work in the song.

It only took McCartney about a week to finish the track:

I just recorded it, and had Cameron over, and said "What do you think of this?" He said "I love it."

== Release ==
The song was nominated for a Golden Globe Award for Best Original Song, for an Academy Award for Best Original Song, for a Grammy Award for Best Song Written for Visual Media, and for a Critics' Choice Movie Award for Best Song, winning the latter.

A live version of the song is featured on the 2002 live album Back in the U.S..
