= From a Lover to a Friend =

Single by Paul McCartney

from the album Driving Rain
- B-side: "Riding Into Jaipur"
- Released: 29 October 2001
- Recorded: 27 February 2001
- Studio: Henson, Los Angeles
- Genre: Rock
- Length: 3:49 (album version)
- Label: Parlophone
- Songwriter: Paul McCartney
- Producer: David Kahne

Paul McCartney singles chronology
"Vo!ce" (1999)	"From a Lover to a Friend" (2001)	"Freedom" (2001)

Music video
- ”From A Lover To A Friend” on YouTube

"From a Lover to a Friend" is a song by Paul McCartney, featured on his 2001 album Driving Rain. It was released as a single and spent two weeks on the UK Singles Chart, peaking at #45. It also reached #6 on the Canadian Singles Chart. In the U.S. it became the b-side to his single "Freedom" and peaked at #24 on the Billboard Adult Contemporary chart.

Critics saw the song as a ballad in which McCartney tries to come to terms with the death of his wife Linda, singing "let me love again"; McCartney, however, was less certain whom the song was about in an interview on Howard Stern's radio show. The Guardian called it a "masterpiece ... so delicate and honest that it sounds pretty much perfect".

"From a Lover to a Friend" was recorded on 27 February 2001, with Paul playing bass and piano, Abe Laboriel, Jr. playing drums, Rusty Anderson on 12-string electric guitar, and Gabe Dixon on piano.

== Track listings ==
7" single

1. "From a Lover to a Friend" – 3:48
2. "Riding Into Jaipur" – 4:08

CD single

1. "From a Lover to a Friend" – 3:49
2. "From a Lover to a Friend" (David Kahne Remix 1) – 3:44
3. "From a Lover to a Friend" (David Kahne Remix 2) – 5:27

Cassette single

1. "From a Lover to a Friend" – 3:48
2. "Riding Into Jaipur" – 4:08
3. "From a Lover to a Friend" (David Kahne Remix 2) – 5:27

== Personnel ==
According to The Paul McCartney Project:

- Paul McCartney – vocals, bass, piano
- Rusty Anderson – 12-string electric guitar
- Gabe Dixon – piano
- Abe Laboriel Jr. – drums

== Charts ==
=== Weekly charts ===
Weekly chart performance for "From a Lover to a Friend"
Chart (2001)	Peak position
Netherlands (Single Top 100)	71
UK Singles (OCC)	45
US Adult Contemporary (Billboard)	24

=== Year-end charts ===
2001 year-end chart performance for "From a Lover to a Friend"
Chart (2001)	Position
Canada (Nielsen SoundScan)	102

2002 year-end chart performance for "From a Lover to a Friend"
Chart (2002)	Position
Canada (Nielsen SoundScan)	120
