= Music from Vanilla Sky =

Soundtrack album by Various artists
- Released: 4 December 2001
- Recorded: Various times
- Length: 73:46 + Extra tracks
- Label: Reprise/WEA
- Producer: Danny Bramson, Cameron Crowe, Bob Ezrin, Gerry Goffin, Bob Johnston, David Kahne, Mark Kozelek, Scott Litt, Patrick McCarthy, Paul McCartney, Josh Rouse, Todd Rundgren, Michael Tighe

Singles from Music from Vanilla Sky
- 1. "All the Right Friends" Released: 2001

Professional ratings
Review scores
Source	Rating
Allmusic	4/5 stars

Music from Vanilla Sky is the soundtrack to the 2001 film Vanilla Sky. The album has been subject to critical acclaim from its reviewers, being called "a music masterpiece" by The New York Times. The eclectic taste of the soundtrack has been said to be one of the reasons the film has become a cult classic. The eponymous song from the soundtrack, written by Paul McCartney, was nominated for an Academy Award for Best Original Song.

== Track listing ==
No.	Title	Artist	Length
1.	"All the Right Friends"	R.E.M.	2:46
2.	"Everything in Its Right Place"	Radiohead	4:09
3.	"Vanilla Sky"	Paul McCartney	2:46
4.	"Solsbury Hill"	Peter Gabriel	4:23
5.	"I Fall Apart"	Julianna Gianni	3:52
6.	"Porpoise Song"	The Monkees	2:52
7.	"Mondo '77"	Looper featuring Francis MacDonald	4:54
8.	"Have You Forgotten"	Red House Painters	5:28
9.	"Directions"	Josh Rouse	3:24
10.	"Afrika Shox"	Leftfield featuring Afrika Bambaataa	3:44
11.	"Svefn-g-englar"	Sigur Rós	9:15
12.	"Last Goodbye"	Jeff Buckley	4:33
13.	"Can We Still Be Friends"	Todd Rundgren	3:33
14.	"4th Time Around"	Bob Dylan	4:35
15.	"Elevator Beat"	Nancy Wilson	2:44
16.	"Sweetness Follows"	R.E.M.	4:19
17.	"Where Do I Begin"	The Chemical Brothers	6:29

== Additional songs ==
- "From Rusholme with Love" by Mint Royale
- "My Robot" by Looper
- "My Favorite Things" by John Coltrane
- "Keep On Pushin'" by The Impressions
- "Wrecking Ball" by Creeper Lagoon
- "Earthtime Tapestry" by Spacecraft
- "Indra" by Thievery Corporation
- "Loops of Fury" by The Chemical Brothers
- "Rez" by Underworld
- "Too Good to Be Strange" by Two Sandwiches Short of a Lunchbox and Andrea Parker
- "One of Us" by Joan Osborne
- "I Might Be Wrong" by Radiohead
- "Wild Honey" by U2
- "Jingle Bell Rock" by Bobby Helms
- "Western Union" by Five Americans
- "You Know You're Right" by Nirvana
  - Cameron Crowe revealed in 2020 that Courtney Love gave him the then-unreleased song to hide in his movie somewhere.
- "Heaven" by The Rolling Stones
- "Good Vibrations" by The Beach Boys
- "Summer's End" by Elmer Bernstein
- "The Healing Room" by Sinéad O'Connor
- "Njósnavélin (The Nothing Song)" by Sigur Rós.
  - The version used in the movie is from a never-released concert which took place in Denmark in 2000.
- "Doot-Doot" by Freur
- "Ladies and Gentlemen, We Are Floating in Space" by Spiritualized
- "Ágætis Byrjun" by Sigur Rós

== Year-end charts ==
Chart (2002)	Position
Canadian Alternative Albums (Nielsen SoundScan)	141
