= Vanilla Sky =

2001 film by Cameron Crowe

- Theatrical release poster
- Directed by: Cameron Crowe
- Screenplay by: Cameron Crowe
- Based on: Abre los ojos by: Alejandro Amenábar; Mateo Gil
- Produced by: Tom Cruise; Paula Wagner; Cameron Crowe
- Starring: Tom Cruise; Penélope Cruz; Kurt Russell; Jason Lee; Noah Taylor; Cameron Diaz
- Cinematography: John Toll
- Edited by: Joe Hutshing; Mark Livolsi
- Music by: Nancy Wilson
- Production companies: Paramount Pictures; Cruise/Wagner Productions; Vinyl Films; Summit Entertainment; Sogecine; Artisan Entertainment
- Distributed by: Paramount Pictures
- Release date: December 14, 2001
- Running time: 136 minutes
- Country: United States
- Language: English
- Budget: $68 million
- Box office: $203 million

Vanilla Sky is a 2001 American science fiction psychological thriller film starring Tom Cruise as a magazine publisher who begins to question reality after being disfigured in a car crash. Written and directed by Cameron Crowe, who also produced with Cruise and Paula Wagner, it is an English-language remake of the 1997 Spanish film Open Your Eyes, which was written by Alejandro Amenábar and Mateo Gil. The supporting cast includes Penélope Cruz (who reprises her role from the original), Kurt Russell, Jason Lee, Noah Taylor, and Cameron Diaz.

Released by Paramount Pictures on December 14, 2001, Vanilla Sky grossed $203 million worldwide against a production budget of $68 million and received mixed reviews from critics. Diaz earned Golden Globe, Critics Choice and Screen Actors Guild nominations for her performance, and Paul McCartney's song "Vanilla Sky" was nominated for the Academy Award for Best Original Song. The film later developed a cult following.

== Plot ==
David Aames Jr., the owner of a large publishing company he inherited from his father, is in prison. Wearing a prosthetic mask, David tells his life story to court psychologist Dr. Curtis McCabe. In flashbacks, David leaves the duties of the publisher to his father's trusted associates while living as a playboy in Manhattan. After his best friend, Brian Shelby, introduces him to Sofia Serrano during a party, David and Sofia spend the night together at Sofia's apartment and fall in love, unaware that David's current lover, Julie Gianni, has followed them there.

As David leaves, Julie offers him a ride and soon reveals her jealousy of Sofia. She deliberately crashes the car, killing herself and disfiguring David. Doctors cannot repair his face using plastic surgery, forcing David to wear a prosthetic mask, and the mental and physical scarring from the accident causes him to become withdrawn and depressed. David joins Brian and Sofia at a club, but they all leave after David starts an argument while drunk. After David insults them and they part ways, David passes out on the street outside the club.

The next day, Sofia returns and apologises to David. She takes him home; the two form a relationship, and he slowly begins to recover. After surgeons find a way to repair David's face despite their prior prognosis, he is plagued by bizarre experiences - such as brief flashbacks of his disfigurement and an encounter with a mysterious man at a bar who informs him that David is omnipotent, demonstrated by the entire bar falling silent at David's command. One day, while at Sofia's, David awakens to find himself in bed with Julie, whose face has replaced Sofia's in their photographs. In shock, he suffocates Julie. David is arrested and imprisoned and his facial disfigurement is mysteriously restored.

McCabe conducts several more interviews, which serve to help David to recall the name "Life Extension". Seeing a company with that name on TV, McCabe arranges to take David there under guard. Rebecca Dearborn, a company representative, explains how Life Extension uses cryonic suspension to save those with terminal illnesses until a cure can be found, keeping them in a lucid dream state to otherwise exercise their mind. David realises that he is in cryonic suspension and that the world he inhabits is his lucid dream, which has become a nightmare. He escapes McCabe and the guards while calling for "tech support", and rushes for the building's lobby, which is suddenly empty. An elevator opens, revealing the strange man from the bar. As the elevator climbs to the top of an impossibly tall building, the man explains that he is Tech Support and that David has been in suspension for 150 years.

Unable to face the twin traumas of the loss of his love, Sofia, and his facial injuries, David had opted for Life Extension, to be awakened when technology could repair his face, and left the publishing company in the hands of his father's associates, ultimately overdosing on medication and causing Brian to arrange a three-day memorial for him in his home. As part of the program, David had chosen to experience a lucid dream, in which his life would resume the morning after Sofia left him; however, a glitch in the software had caused other elements of his subconscious to distort his dream.

David and Tech Support emerge on the rooftop, high above the clouds. There, Tech Support tells David that although they have corrected the flaw, he now has a choice of either being returned to the dream or being restored to life, requiring a literal leap of faith off the roof that will wake him from his sleep. David chooses the latter, despite McCabe warning him against it. Before jumping, David envisions Brian and Sofia to say his goodbyes. He leaps from the edge of the building, and his life flashes before him. A female voice invites him to open his eyes, which he does.

== Cast ==
- Tom Cruise as David Aames, Jr.
- Cameron Diaz as Julianna "Julie" Gianni
- Penélope Cruz as Sofia Serrano
- Kurt Russell as Dr. Curtis McCabe
- Jason Lee as Brian Shelby
- Noah Taylor as Edmund Ventura / Tech Support
- Timothy Spall as Thomas Tipp
- Tilda Swinton as Rebecca Dearborn
- Michael Shannon as Aaron
- Shalom Harlow as Colleen
- Oona Hart as Lynette
- Ivana Miličević as Emma
- Johnny Galecki as Peter Brown
- Alicia Witt as Libby
- Ken Leung as art editor
- Conan O'Brien as himself
- Tommy Lee as a frozen vintage car man
- Laura Fraser as The Future (the voice at the end of the movie telling David to wake up)
- Steven Spielberg as a guest at David's party (uncredited)

== Production ==
=== Development ===
In the days after completing Almost Famous, the opportunity to keep our film-making team together was too attractive to pass up. I'd always written my own original screenplays, but Open Your Eyes, with its open-ended and impressionistic themes, felt like a great song for our 'band' to cover.

— Cameron Crowe, explaining his reason for directing Vanilla Sky.

After the American debut of Alejandro Amenábar's 1997 Spanish film Abre los ojos (Open Your Eyes) at the 1998 Sundance Film Festival, Tom Cruise and his producing partner Paula Wagner optioned the remake rights. Hoping to entice director Cameron Crowe, who collaborated with Cruise on Jerry Maguire, Cruise invited Crowe over to his house to view the film. Cruise has stated:

I've been offered a lot of films to buy and remake, and I never have because I felt it was too connected with the culture of that place, whatever country it was from. But this was a universal story that was still open-ended, that still felt like it needed another chapter to be told.

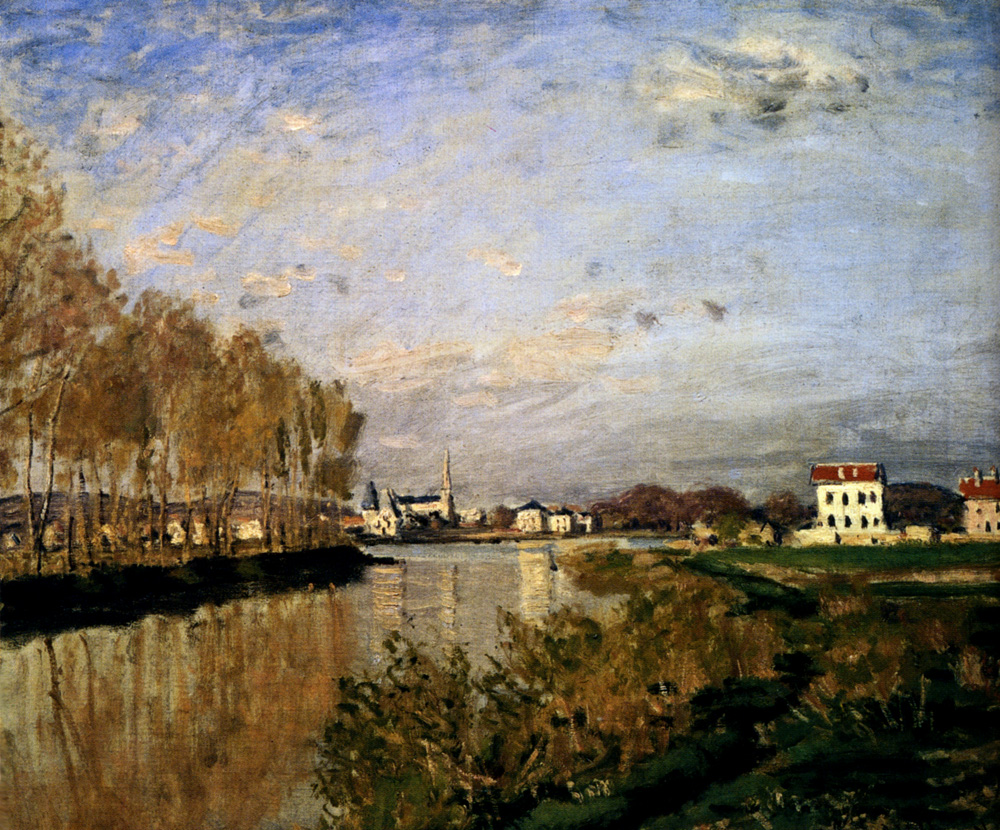
The title Vanilla Sky refers to the sky as painted by Claude Monet, specifically as in The Seine at Argenteuil (1873) which is featured in the film.

The title of the film is a reference to depictions of skies in certain paintings by Claude Monet. In addition to Monet's impressionistic artwork, the film's tone was derived from the acoustic ballad "By Way of Sorrow" by Julie Miller and a line from an early interview of Elvis Presley in which he said, "I feel lonely, even in a crowded room."

=== Filming ===
Principal photography for Vanilla Sky began in late 2000 and lasted six weeks. On November 12, 2000, shooting for the scene of the deserted Times Square in New York took place in the early hours of the day. A large section of traffic was blocked off around Times Square while the scene was shot. "There was a limit on how long the city would let us lock everything up even on an early Sunday morning when much of NYC would be slow getting up," said Steadicam operator Larry McConkey. "Several times we rehearsed with Steadicam and Crane including a mockup of an unmovable guardrail that we had to work the crane arm around. [Cruise] participated in these rehearsals as well so we shared a clear understanding of what my limitations and requirements would be."

Filming lasted for six weeks around the New York City area, which included scenes in Central Park, the Upper West Side, SoHo, and Brooklyn. One prominent location in the area was the Condé Nast Building that served as Aames Publishing and David's office. After filming finished in New York, production moved to Los Angeles, where the remaining interior shots were completed at Paramount Studios. Crowe intentionally left in shots of the World Trade Center after the September 11 attacks as a tribute.

Despite the film's distorted aspects of reality, the style of cinematography remains grounded for much of the film. "I didn't do anything that was overtly obvious, because the story revolves around the main character not knowing whether he's in a state of reality, a dream or a nightmare, so we want it to feel a little ambiguous," said cinematographer John Toll. "We want the audience to make discoveries as [Cruise]'s character does, rather than ahead of him." American Cinematographer magazine wrote a feature story on the lighting designer Lee Rose's work on the film.

=== Alternate ending ===
The 2015 Blu-ray release offers the option to watch the film with an alternative ending. This ending expands on the details at the end of the film. While it all leads to the same conclusion, there are additional scenes, alternative takes, and alternative dialogue.

After Rebecca describes the lucid dream, David rushes out of the room but does not immediately dash towards the elevator. He meets McCabe in the restroom who tries to convince him that this is all a hoax and a con and that his case is going to trial. David tells him that he's only in his imagination. Much like in the theatrical cut, the Beach Boys' "Good Vibrations" plays, but this version makes it clear that David hears the music and that he chose it; meanwhile, McCabe tries to convince him there is no music.

At this point, David dashes out of the restroom for the elevator the way he does in the theatrical cut, but the scene in the lobby is expanded: David shoots the police officer who is firing at him and is then surrounded by a SWAT team whom McCabe tries to talk down, but the SWAT team fires at both of them. They black out and wake up in the emptied lobby where McCabe continues to applaud what he believes is a performance while David gets into the elevator with Ventura, who tells him what happened at the end of his real life.

Once they reach the roof, McCabe reenters again and his pleas to David not to believe Ventura become more and more desperate until he collapses onto the ground in despair. David's interaction with Sofia is extended as he tells her he loves her but "can't settle for a dream". He then jumps off the building, screaming "I want to wake up!" as images from his life flash before his eyes. He wakes up in bed and a voice tells him "Open your eyes. You're going to be fine."

== Music ==
Vanilla Sky's score was by Crowe's then wife, Nancy Wilson, who also scored Jerry Maguire and Almost Famous. Wilson spent nine months on the film's music, which was done through experimentation of sound collages. "We were trying to balance out the heaviness of the story with sugary pop-culture music," she said. "We made sound collages of all kinds. We were channeling Brian Wilson to a large extent. I was recording things through hoses, around corners, playing guitars with cello bows, and with [music editor] Carl Kaller, we tried all kinds of wacky stuff. In the murder–sex scene sound collage, Cameron even used Brian Wilson's speaking voice from a Pet Sounds mix session."

Besides the publicly available soundtrack album, Music from Vanilla Sky, the original score was released as a "for your consideration" release for Academy Awards nomination and never released publicly for sale.

The eponymous song from the soundtrack, written and recorded by Paul McCartney, was nominated for an Academy Award for Best Original Song. Additional songs featured included Radiohead's song "Everything in Its Right Place", and "Svefn-g-englar" by the Icelandic group Sigur Rós.

== Interpretations ==
According to Cameron Crowe's commentary, there are five different interpretations of the ending:

1. "Tech support" is telling the truth: 150 years have passed since David killed himself and subsequent events form a lucid dream.
2. The entire film is a dream, evidenced by a sticker on David’s car that reads "2/30/01" (February 30 does not occur in the Gregorian calendar).
3. The events after the crash are a dream David has while comatose.
4. The entire film is the plot of the book that Brian is writing.
5. The entire film after the crash is a hallucination caused by drugs administered during David’s reconstructive surgery.

Crowe notes that the presence of a "Vanilla Sky" during the morning reunion after the nightclub scene marks the first lucid dream scene, and that everything that follows from then on is a dream.

== Reception ==
=== Box office ===
Vanilla Sky opened at number one at the box office in the United States when it was first presented on December 14, 2001. The opening weekend took in a gross income of $25,015,518 (24.9%). The final domestic gross income was $100 million while the international gross income was slightly higher at $103 million for a total worldwide gross income of $203 million.

=== Critical response ===
On Rotten Tomatoes, 41% of 173 critic reviews are positive and the average rating is 6/10. The site's consensus states: "An ambitious mix of genres, Vanilla Sky collapses into an incoherent jumble. Cruise's performance lacks depth, and it's hard to feel sympathy for his narcissistic character." On Metacritic, the film has a weighted average score of 45 out of 100 based on 33 reviews, indicating "mixed or average reviews". Audiences polled by CinemaScore gave the film a grade "D−" on a scale from A to F.

Roger Ebert's printed review of Vanilla Sky awarded the film three out of four stars:

Think it all the way through, and Cameron Crowe's Vanilla Sky is a scrupulously moral picture. It tells the story of a man who has just about everything, thinks he can have it all, is given a means to have whatever he wants, and loses it because—well, maybe because he has a conscience. Or maybe not. Maybe just because life sucks. Or maybe he only thinks it does. This is the kind of movie you don't want to analyze until you've seen it two times.

Ebert interpreted the ending as an explanation for "the mechanism of our confusion", rather than a device that tells "us for sure what actually happened." Film critic Richard Roeper ranked the film the second best of 2001.

Stephen Holden of The New York Times called Vanilla Sky a "highly entertaining, erotic science-fiction thriller that takes Mr. Crowe into Steven Spielberg territory", but then said: "As it leaves behind the real world and begins exploring life as a waking dream (this year's most popular theme in Hollywood movies with lofty ideas), Vanilla Sky loosens its emotional grip and becomes a disorganised and abstract if still-intriguing meditation on parallel themes. One is the quest for eternal life and eternal youth; another is guilt and the ungovernable power of the unconscious mind to undermine science's utopian discoveries. David's redemption ultimately consists of his coming to grips with his own mortality, but that redemption lacks conviction."

Salon called Vanilla Sky an "aggressively plotted puzzle picture, which clutches many allegedly deep themes to its heaving bosom without uncovering even an onion-skin layer of insight into any of them." The review rhetorically asked: "Who would have thought that Cameron Crowe had a movie as bad as Vanilla Sky in him? It's a punishing picture, a betrayal of everything that Crowe has proved he knows how to do right. ... But the disheartening truth is that we can see Crowe taking all the right steps, the most Crowe-like steps, as he mounts a spectacle that overshoots boldness and ambition and idiosyncrasy and heads right for arrogance and pretension—and those last two are traits I never would have thought we'd have to ascribe to Crowe." Edward Guthmann of the San Francisco Chronicle gave the film 2/4 and wrote: "The film's aim—to dazzle and inspire—is sapped by Cruise's vein-popping, running-the-marathon performance."

Peter Bradshaw of The Guardian and Gareth Von Kallenbach of the publication Film Threat compared Vanilla Sky unfavorably to Open Your Eyes. Bradshaw said that Open Your Eyes is "certainly more distinctive" than Vanilla Sky, which he described as an "extraordinarily narcissistic high-concept vanity project for producer-star Tom Cruise." Other reviewers extrapolated from the knowledge that Cruise had bought the rights to do a version of Amenábar's film. A Village Voice reviewer characterized Vanilla Sky as "hauntingly frank about being a manifestation of its star's cosmic narcissism".

Kenneth Turan of the Los Angeles Times called Cameron Diaz "compelling as the embodiment of crazed sensuality" and The New York Times reviewer said she gives a "ferociously emotional" performance. Edward Guthmann of the San Francisco Chronicle similarly said of the film, "most impressive is Cameron Diaz, whose fatal-attraction stalker is both heartbreaking and terrifying." For her performance, Diaz won multiple critics' groups awards, as well as being nominated for the Golden Globe Award, Screen Actors Guild Award, Critics' Choice Movie Award, Saturn Award, and AFI Award. Penélope Cruz's performance earned her a Razzie Award nomination for Worst Actress (in addition to her roles in Blow and Captain Corelli's Mandolin).

The film later developed a cult following.

=== Awards ===
Accolades for Vanilla Sky
Organization	Year	Category	Recipient(s)	Result	Ref.
Academy Awards	2002	Best Original Song	Paul McCartney (for the song "Vanilla Sky")	Nominated	
AFI Awards	2002	Featured Actress of the Year	Cameron Diaz	Nominated	
ALMA Awards	2002	Outstanding Actress in a Motion Picture	Penélope Cruz	Nominated	
ALMA Awards	2002	Outstanding Supporting Actress in a Motion Picture	Cameron Diaz	Nominated	
Boston Society of Film Critics Awards	2001	Best Supporting Actress	Cameron Diaz	Won	
Chicago Film Critics Association Awards	2001	Best Supporting Actress	Cameron Diaz	Won	
Critics' Choice Movie Awards	2002	Best Supporting Actress	Cameron Diaz	Nominated	
Critics' Choice Movie Awards	2002	Best Song	Paul McCartney (for the song "Vanilla Sky")	Won (Note: Tied with "May It Be" from The Lord of the Rings: The Fellowship of the Ring.)	
Dallas–Fort Worth Film Critics Association Awards	2002	Best Supporting Actress	Cameron Diaz	Nominated	
Golden Globe Awards	2002	Best Supporting Actress – Motion Picture	Cameron Diaz	Nominated	
Golden Globe Awards	2002	Best Original Song	Paul McCartney (for the song "Vanilla Sky")	Nominated	
Golden Raspberry Awards	2002	Worst Actress (Note: also for Blow and Captain Corelli's Mandolin.)	Penélope Cruz	Nominated	
Golden Reel Awards	2002	Outstanding Achievement in Sound Editing – Dialogue and ADR for Feature Film	List of sound editors (Note: Michael D. Wilhoit (supervising sound editor); Kerry Dean Williams (supervising ADR editor); Laura Harris Atkinson (supervising dialogue editor); Tammy Fearing, Eliza Pollack Zebert (ADR editors); Mark Gordon, Vic Radulich, Clare C. Freeman, Susan Kurtz (dialogue editors).)	Nominated	
Golden Reel Awards	2002	Outstanding Achievement in Sound Editing – Feature Underscore	Carlton Kaller	Nominated	
Grammy Awards	2003	Best Song Written for Visual Media	Paul McCartney (for the song "Vanilla Sky")	Nominated	
Satellite Awards	2002	Best Original Song	Paul McCartney (for the song "Vanilla Sky")	Nominated	
Satellite Awards	2002	Best Original Song	Cameron Crowe and Nancy Wilson (for the song "I Fall Apart")	Nominated	
Saturn Awards	2002	Best Science Fiction Film	Vanilla Sky	Nominated	
Saturn Awards	2002	Best Actor	Tom Cruise	Won	
Saturn Awards	2002	Best Supporting Actress	Cameron Diaz	Nominated	
Saturn Awards	2002	Best Make-Up	Michèle Burke and Camille Calvet	Nominated	
Saturn Awards	2002	Best Music	Nancy Wilson	Nominated	
Saturn Awards	2016	Best DVD or Blu-ray Special Edition Release	Vanilla Sky (Alternate Ending)	Nominated	
Screen Actors Guild Awards	2002	Outstanding Performance by a Female Actor in a Supporting Role	Cameron Diaz	Nominated	

== Home media ==
Vanilla Sky was released on DVD and VHS on May 21, 2002, Blu-ray in 2015, and Ultra HD Blu-ray in 2023.
