= Your Loving Flame =

Promotional single by Paul McCartney

from the album Driving Rain
- Released: 12 November 2001
- Recorded: 19 June 2001
- Genre: Ballad
- Length: 3:43
- Label: Parlophone
- Songwriter: Paul McCartney
- Producer: David Kahne

"Your Loving Flame" is a song by the English musician Paul McCartney. It appears as the thirteenth track on his thirteenth solo studio album Driving Rain (2001) and was also released as a promotional single. A piano-driven ballad written for McCartney's then-wife Heather Mills, it has received positive reviews from critics, often being cited as a highlight of its parent album.

== Reception ==
James Westfox of Drowned in Sound declared "Your Loving Flame" to be the album's "standout" track, calling it "indescribably beautiful" and arguing it "would've made a perfect choice for lead single".

== Charts ==
Chart (2002)	Peak position
US Adult Contemporary (Billboard)	19
