= Hello, Goodbye =

1967 single by the Beatles

- US picture sleeve

Single by the Beatles
- B-side: "I Am the Walrus"
- Released: 24 November 1967
- Recorded: 2 October – 2 November 1967
- Studio: EMI, London
- Genre: Pop, psychedelia
- Length: 3:27
- Label: Parlophone (UK); Capitol (US)
- Songwriter: Lennon–McCartney
- Producer: George Martin

The Beatles singles chronology
"All You Need Is Love" (1967)	"Hello, Goodbye" (1967)	"Lady Madonna" (1968)

Promotional film
- "Hello, Goodbye" on YouTube

"Hello, Goodbye" (sometimes titled "Hello Goodbye") is a song by the English rock band the Beatles, written by Paul McCartney and credited to Lennon–McCartney. Backed by John Lennon's "I Am the Walrus", it was issued as a non-album single in November 1967, the group's first release since the death of their manager, Brian Epstein. The single was commercially successful around the world, topping charts in the United States, the United Kingdom, France, West Germany, Canada, Australia and several other countries. In the UK, it was the Christmas number one of 1967.

McCartney later said that the lyrics take duality as their theme. The song originated when, in response to a question from Beatles aide Alistair Taylor about songwriting, McCartney sat down at a harmonium and asked Taylor to say the opposite of whatever he said. The completed song includes a musical coda, which was improvised by the Beatles when they were recording the track in October 1967. Unimpressed with the composition, Lennon pushed for "I Am the Walrus" to be the single's A-side, before reluctantly accepting that "Hello, Goodbye" was the more commercial-sounding of the two sides. The Beatles produced three promotional films for the song, one of which was shown on The Ed Sullivan Show in America. Due to the regulations against lip-syncing on British television, none of the clips were aired there.

"Hello, Goodbye" has traditionally received a varied response from music critics. While some reviewers praise the song for its classic pop qualities, others deem it unadventurous by the Beatles' standards, and inconsequential. The track was included on the expanded US release of the Magical Mystery Tour soundtrack EP, and later appeared on compilation albums such as 1967–1970 and 1. McCartney has often performed "Hello, Goodbye" in concert, beginning with his Driving World Tour in 2002. James Last, Bud Shank, Allen Toussaint, the Cure and the cast of Glee are among the acts who have also recorded the song. McCartney performed it with Stephen Colbert singing backup on the final episode of The Late Show with Stephen Colbert on 21 May 2026.

== Background ==
The answer to everything is simple. It's a song about everything and nothing ... If you have black you have to have white. That's the amazing thing about life.

— Paul McCartney, discussing "Hello, Goodbye" in a 1967 interview with Disc magazine

Although "Hello, Goodbye" is credited to Lennon–McCartney, the song was written solely by Paul McCartney. The composition came about through an exercise in word association between McCartney and Alistair Taylor, an assistant of the Beatles' manager, Brian Epstein. It originated during a period when, following the completion of their album Sgt. Pepper's Lonely Hearts Club Band in April 1967, the Beatles typically embraced randomness and simplicity as part of the creative process.

According to Taylor's recollection, he was visiting McCartney at his home in St John's Wood, London, and asked the Beatle how he went about writing a song. In response, McCartney took Taylor into the dining room, where they both sat at a harmonium; McCartney then began playing the instrument and asked Taylor to call out the opposite to each word he happened to sing. Author Steve Turner writes of the result: "And so it went – black and white, yes and no, stop and go, hello and goodbye." Taylor later reflected: "I've no memory at all of the tune ... I wonder whether Paul really made up [the melody to] that song as he went along or whether it was running through his head already."

Talking in the 1990s to his official biographer, Barry Miles, McCartney said that the lyrics address duality, reflecting his astrological sign of Gemini. He added: "It's such a deep theme in the universe, duality – man woman, black white, ebony ivory, high low, right wrong, up down, hello goodbye – that it was a very easy song to write." McCartney also said that, in "Hello, Goodbye", he was promoting "the more positive side of the duality".

Among Beatles biographers, Ian MacDonald dates the composition to late September 1967, while Bob Spitz says it was written in time for the Our World international television broadcast, in June that year. According to Spitz, McCartney suggested "Hello, Goodbye" as the Beatles' contribution to Our World, an honour that instead went to the John Lennon-composed "All You Need Is Love". (Note: Spitz's claim contradicts the more widely held view that McCartney submitted "Your Mother Should Know" for the broadcast.)

== Composition ==
"Hello, Goodbye" is in the key of C major and in 4/4 time. MacDonald describes the musical structure as "characteristically scalar" and founded on "a descending sequence in C", with "a brief touchdown on A flat as its only surprise". Musicologist Walter Everett writes that the bassline in the chorus is an inverted form of the descending scale, which is accentuated on the Beatles' recording by the lead guitar part.

In Everett's estimation, much of "Hello, Goodbye" references previous Lennon–McCartney compositions: over the verses, the parallel thirds in the vocal recall the band's unreleased song "Love of the Loved", among others; melodically, the chorus is similar to the keyboard part on "For No One"; and the complementary vocal parts in the final verse recall "Help!" Everett also suggests that, early in "Hello, Goodbye", McCartney appears to be imitating the V–VI chord "ambivalence" of "Strawberry Fields Forever". Everett describes the composition as "derivative McCartney", for the most part, "freshened up" primarily through the use of phrase lengths that deviate from a standard eight bars.

Consistent with the song title, the lyrics comprise a series of antonyms – such as yes–no, high–low and stop–go. With the narrative perspective alternating between first and second person, the composition also recalls George and Ira Gershwin's "Let's Call the Whole Thing Off".

Following the third chorus, at 2:36 on the released recording, the bassline descends chromatically to mark the start of what musicologist Alan Pollack terms the "first outro" and Everett calls a "codetta". After this false ending, the song returns with a 45-second coda, which MacDonald identifies as a "Maori finale – a mistake for 'Hawaiian' (aloha)". The coda consists of a repeated musical phrase over a pedal point in C major, accompanied by the vocal refrain "Helaheba-hello-a".

== Recording ==
The Beatles began recording "Hello, Goodbye" at EMI Studios (now Abbey Road Studios) in October 1967, towards the end of filming for their Magical Mystery Tour television special. The latter was a film project that McCartney had initiated in an effort to focus the group in the wake of Epstein's death that August. Under the working title "Hello Hello", the Beatles taped the basic track for the song on 2 October, with George Martin producing the session and Geoff Emerick and Ken Scott as engineers. Author Richie Unterberger comments that the production and recording was unusually straightforward, relative to the experimentalism that had characterised much of the Beatles' studio work since completing Sgt. Pepper. The line-up on the take selected for overdubs, take 14, was McCartney on piano, Lennon on Hammond organ, George Harrison on maracas, and Ringo Starr on drums.

The band members then added tambourine, conga drum and bongos over the coda. This last section of the song came about while the group were working in the studio. Lennon, who was otherwise highly critical of "Hello, Goodbye", approved of the addition, saying: "The best bit was the end, which we all ad-libbed in the studio, where I played the piano. Like one of my favourite bits on 'Ticket to Ride', where we just threw something in at the end." In McCartney's recollection, the coda "didn't sound quite right" until Emerick increased the reverberation on the tom-tom drums, at which point, "it just came alive." (Note: McCartney added: "we put this echo full up on the tom-toms ... We Phil Spector'd it.") Everett cites the "Maori finale" as an example of the Beatles' pioneering use of codas in their recordings; in this instance, they provided "the cold ending followed by an unrelated coda", having similarly pioneered the "fade-out–fade-in coda" at the end of "Rain" and "Strawberry Fields Forever".

The Beatles returned to the song on 19 October, two days after attending a memorial service for Epstein at the New London Synagogue on Abbey Road. At this session, Harrison added his lead guitar parts (treated with Leslie effect), McCartney recorded the lead vocal, (Note: McCartney's vocal on the song was sped up to give a "cleaner" sound.) and Lennon, McCartney and Harrison supplied backing vocals; handclaps were also overdubbed. With two reduction mixes having been carried out since 2 October, to free up space on the four-track tape for these and later overdubs, the master take was now nominally take 16. This version of the song appeared on the 1996 outtakes compilation Anthology 2. In his book The Unreleased Beatles, Unterberger writes that take 16 features a more "active" guitar line from Harrison, who answers McCartney's vocal phrasing over the opening verse with a series of descending fills. Also present on this version is a short guitar solo, which would be replaced on the official release by what Unterberger terms "some inspired Paul scat-tinged singing". Unterberger speculates that the removal of these guitar parts may have caused tension between McCartney and Harrison, anticipating the pair's disagreements regarding the lead guitarist's role on McCartney compositions such as "Hey Jude" and "Two of Us" over 1968–69.

Two violas were added to "Hello, Goodbye" at Abbey Road on 20 October. These string parts were played by classical musicians Kenneth Essex and Leo Brinbaum, and scored by Martin, who based the arrangement on a melody McCartney supplied on piano. McCartney overdubbed bass guitar on 25 October and, following a trip to Nice in France to film his "Fool on the Hill" segment for Magical Mystery Tour, added further bass to the track on 2 November. A mono mix of "Hello, Goodbye" was completed that same day, and the stereo version on 6 November.

== Release ==
That's another McCartney. Smells a mile away, doesn't it? An attempt to write a single. It wasn't a great piece.

— John Lennon, 1980

"Hello, Goodbye" was selected as the Beatles' single for the 1967 Christmas season, their first release since Epstein's death. Lennon pushed for his composition "I Am the Walrus" to be the A-side instead, but then ceded to McCartney and Martin's insistence that "Hello, Goodbye" was the more commercial of the two tracks. Lennon remained dismissive of the song; he later said: "'Hello, Goodbye' beat out 'I Am the Walrus' ... Can you believe that? I began to submerge." Everett writes that, had "I Am the Walrus" been the A-side, "[it] would probably have encouraged Lennon to lead the Beatles to new heights", whereas the decision to choose "Hello, Goodbye" was "one more nail in the Beatles coffin". (Note: Similarly unimpressed with the song, Bill Turner, a friend from the band's years in Liverpool, told McCartney, "Well to be honest with you, I thought it was a bit repetitious really, and not one of your best records.")

In Britain, Parlophone issued "Hello, Goodbye" backed by "I Am the Walrus" on 24 November 1967, with the catalogue number R 5655. Within a day of its release, the record had sold over 300,000 copies there. It went on to top the national chart compiled by Record Retailer (later the UK Singles Chart) for seven weeks, through to 23 January 1968, giving the Beatles their longest run at number 1 on that chart since "She Loves You" in 1963. In the process, the song became the group's fourth Christmas number 1 single in five years. For three weeks from 27 December 1967, the band held the top two positions in the UK, with the Magical Mystery Tour soundtrack EP trailing "Hello, Goodbye".

The single was released on 27 November in the United States, as Capitol 2056, and in the issue dated 30 December replaced the Monkees' "Daydream Believer" at number one on Billboard's Hot 100, where it remained for three weeks, becoming the band's fifteenth American chart-topper. The single was certified gold by the Recording Industry Association of America on 15 December 1967. It was later listed by Billboard magazine as the band's seventh biggest US chart hit. The single was successful in many other countries, topping charts in Australia, Canada, West Germany, Holland and Norway. It also peaked at number 2 in Ireland, Austria, Belgium and Switzerland.

"Hello, Goodbye" was included on the American Magical Mystery Tour album, which Capitol Records compiled by adding five non-album singles tracks from 1967 to the six songs issued in most other countries on the double EP. In the Magical Mystery Tour film, which aired on British television on 26 December 1967, the song's coda plays over the end credits. "Hello, Goodbye" subsequently appeared on Beatles compilation albums such as 1967–1970 and 1. As part of EMI's policy of celebrating the 20th anniversary of each Beatles single, "Hello, Goodbye" was reissued in the UK in November 1987 and peaked at number 63 on the UK Singles Chart.

== Promotional films ==
[Directing] was something I'd always been interested in, until I actually tried it ... I didn't really direct the film[s] – all we needed was a couple of cameras, some good cameramen, a bit of sound and some dancing girls ... we took our Sgt Pepper suits along.

— Paul McCartney, 2000

The band made three promotional clips for "Hello, Goodbye". Filmed on 10 November 1967 at the Saville Theatre in London, a theatre leased by Epstein since 1966, the clips were directed by McCartney. The first one shows the Beatles dressed in their Sgt. Pepper uniforms, apart from some brief cut-aways where the group are wearing their 1963-era matching collarless suits. In author John Winn's description of the three clips, this version shows the Beatles performing the song against a psychedelic backdrop, while over the coda they are joined on the stage by female hula dancers. Starr is seen playing a miniature drum kit and, unusually, Lennon appears without his granny glasses. In the second clip, the Beatles mime to the song dressed in more conventional attire and with the stage backdrop depicting a rural setting. The third version combines footage shot during these two scenes with the band playing the song before what Winn terms a "glittery pastel backdrop". (Note: According to Winn, this third film is "by far the most entertaining version", since the Beatles are seen "flirting with the dancers, running across the stage, and dancing frenetically".)

The first of the three promotional clips for "Hello, Goodbye", showing the Beatles in their Sgt. Pepper outfits, accompanied by female hula dancers

In the US, the first promo for "Hello, Goodbye" was premiered on The Ed Sullivan Show on 26 November. Author Mark Hertsgaard describes the film as "a slapdash affair featuring the hula dancers that was salvaged only by some ludicrously spastic dancing by Lennon". Music critic Robert Christgau was also unimpressed; speculating in the May 1968 issue of Esquire on the content of the Magical Mystery Tour film, which had yet to air in America, Christgau wrote: "But if Paul McCartney's work on the film clip of 'Hello Goodbye' is any indication, we would be wise not to hope for too much." In his book Rock, Counterculture and the Avant-Garde, author Doyle Greene finds it significant that Starr's miniature bass drum lacks the familiar Beatles logo, and he interprets the band's waving to the viewer while dressed in their 1963 stage attire as the Beatles "waving 'goodbye' to the mop-top era and 'hello' to the counterculture".

In Britain, the Beatles ran foul of the Musicians Union's ban on miming on television. With the first clip scheduled to premier on the 23 November edition of Top of the Pops, George Martin mixed a version of the track without violas, since no musician was seen to be playing those instruments; the Beatles then allowed the BBC to film them at work editing Magical Mystery Tour on 21 November, in the hope that this new footage would replace any sections that contravened the ban. Instead, Top of the Pops aired the song over scenes from the band's 1964 film A Hard Day's Night. For the 7 December edition of the same show, the BBC ran a clip comprising still photographs mixed with some of the editing-suite film – a combination that served as the promo for "Hello, Goodbye" throughout the remainder of its UK chart run.

The clip included in the 1996 Beatles Anthology video release consists of the Beatles' first Saville Theatre film, until the song's coda, which incorporates footage from all three of the original promo films. The first of the original promos was included in the Beatles' 2015 video compilation 1, and all three were included in the three-disc versions of the compilation, titled 1+. The BBC-compiled clip appeared as a bonus feature on the 2012 DVD reissue of Magical Mystery Tour, under the title "Top of the Pops 1967". In May 2013, a Vox electric guitar used by Lennon during part of the filming for "Hello, Goodbye" sold for US$408,000 at an auction in New York. (Note: The same guitar was played by Harrison during rehearsals for the "I Am the Walrus" segment in Magical Mystery Tour.)

== Critical reception ==
Writing in December 1967, Richard Goldstein of The New York Times said that "Hello, Goodbye" "sounds like a B-side" and described it as "interesting but subordinate". In his single review for Melody Maker, Nick Jones wrote: "Superficially it's a very 'ordinary' Beatles record without cascading sitars, and the involved, weaving hallucinogenic sounds that we've grown to love so much. However, all the Beatles soul and feeling is shining through ..." Derek Johnson of the NME welcomed the simplicity of "Hello, Goodbye", describing it as "Supremely commercial, and the answer to those who feel The Beatles are going too way out". Cash Box's reviewer said that the song's closing section was "brilliant" and wrote: "Minimum of words, minimum of melody and practically no subject at all, yet the Beatles have a new side that packs a panchromatic rainbow of sound into the narrow limits that Lennon & McCartney have chosen to work with …"

In his book Revolution in the Head, Ian MacDonald views the track as "blandly catchy" and comments that its long stay at number 1 in Britain "says more about the sudden decline of the singles chart than the quality of the song itself". Rob Sheffield of Rolling Stone considers that, at this stage in their career, "the Beatles didn't need to push – they could have hit #1 with a tape of themselves blowing their noses", which, he suggests, "would have been catchier" than both "Hello, Goodbye" and the band's next single, "Lady Madonna". Writing for Rough Guides, Chris Ingham describes "Hello, Goodbye" as a "harmless, facile word and chord-play that kept the far more challenging 'Walrus' from being the A-side of the [Beatles'] first post-Epstein single". In the opinion of cultural commentator Steven D. Stark, the song has "the catchiest of tunes" but "insipid" lyrics, which, had the Beatles' two principal songwriters been collaborating in the manner of previous years, Lennon would have insisted that McCartney rework. Peter Doggett labels it "commercial but rather inconsequential ... three minutes of contradictions and meaningless juxtapositions, with a tune that was impossible to forget".

In a 2005 review of the Magical Mystery Tour album, Sputnikmusic lauded the song for "encapsulating everything that made the Beatles such a great pop band", and praised its piano line, Starr's drumming, and the coda. Writing for AllMusic, Richie Unterberger names "Hello, Goodbye" as one of the "huge, glorious, and innovative singles" on Magical Mystery Tour, while Billboard's Chris Payne rates the track among the band's "most perfect pop songs". Scott Plagenhoef of Pitchfork cites it as an example of how McCartney "excelled at selling simplistic lyrics that risk seeming cloying", although he adds: "the kaleidoscopic, carnival-ride melody and interplay between lead and backing vocals ensure it's a much better record than it is a song."

In the NME's 2015 list of the "100 Greatest Beatles Songs" as selected by other musicians, "Hello, Goodbye" was chosen by the Cure and ranked 91st. Ultimate Classic Rock website places the track at number 45 on its list of the "Top 50 Beatles Songs", while Rolling Stone ranks it last on the magazine's "100 Greatest Beatles Songs" list, with the editor remarking: "McCartney never claimed that the irresistibly bouncy 'Hello, Goodbye' was his most profound songwriting moment." In 2006, the track appeared at number 36 in a similar list compiled by Mojo, accompanied by commentary from Alan McGee, who described it as "the greatest-ever pop song, bar none". "Hello, Goodbye" is ranked 76th by Stephen Spignesi and Michael Lewis in their book 100 Best Beatles Songs, where the authors call it a "classic" and a "fine, fresh, fun piece of pop".

== Cover versions and Paul McCartney live performances ==
James Last, the Hollyridge Strings, Bud Shank and the Soulful Strings were all among the artists who covered "Hello, Goodbye" in the year following its release in 1967. Allen Toussaint, with whom McCartney worked briefly on his and Wings' 1975 album Venus and Mars, released a version of the song in 1989. More recent covers include recordings by Dwight Twilley and the band Ash, and a novelty version by Looney Tunes characters credited to "Bugs & Friends".

The cast of the US television show Glee released a recording of "Hello, Goodbye" as the opening track of their 2010 album Glee: The Music, Volume 3 Showstoppers. This version became a hit when issued as a single. (Note: Among its international chart placings, the single peaked at number 23 in Canada and number 24 in Ireland.) In 2014, the Cure recorded the song with McCartney's son James, for inclusion on the multi-artist compilation The Art of McCartney. Classic Rock magazine described it as "Sufficiently clattery and 'Love Cats'-ish to escape comparisons with the original". Evanescence's co-founder and lead vocalist Amy Lee included a cover of "Hello, Goodbye" on her 2016 children's album Dream Too Much.

McCartney has performed "Hello, Goodbye" on many of his tours as a solo artist. These include 2002's Driving World Tour and 2003's Back in the World Tour, when he opened his concerts with the song, and the On the Run Tour in 2011–12. In addition, throughout his 1989–90 world tour, McCartney segued the coda onto the end of "Put It There". This medley was included on McCartney's 1990 triple album Tripping the Live Fantastic, while a full live rendition of "Hello, Goodbye" appeared on Back in the U.S. in 2002. McCartney performed it on the series finale of The Late Show with Stephen Colbert alongside his occasional collaborator Elvis Costello, host Stephen Colbert, and the Late Show house band.

== Personnel ==
According to Ian MacDonald: (Note: Among other commentators, however, Walter Everett credits Harrison with all of the song's guitar parts (as well as maracas on the basic track), as does Kenneth Womack, while Jean-Michel Guesdon and Philippe Margotin similarly question whether Lennon played lead guitar. According to Lennon's own recollection, in 1980, he played piano over the song's coda.)

The Beatles

- Paul McCartney – double-tracked lead and backing vocals, piano, bass, bongos, conga
- John Lennon – lead guitar, Hammond organ, backing vocals
- George Harrison – lead guitar, backing vocals
- Ringo Starr – drums, maracas, tambourine, backing vocals (over coda)

Additional musicians and production

- Kenneth Essex – viola
- Leo Birnbaum – viola
- George Martin – producer
- Geoff Emerick – sound engineer
- Ken Scott – sound engineer

== Charts ==
=== Weekly charts ===
Chart (1967–68)	Peak position
Australian Go-Set National Top 40	1
Austrian Singles Chart	2
Belgian Singles Chart	2
Canadian RPM 100	1
Danish Singles Chart (Danmarks Radio)	1
Dutch Singles Chart	1
Finnish Suomen virallinen lista	11
French SNICOP Singles	1
Irish Singles Chart	2
Italian Musica e Dischi Chart	15
New Zealand Listener Chart	1
Norwegian VG-lista Singles	1
Rhodesian Lyons Maid Chart	2
Spanish El Gran Musical Chart	3
Swedish Kvällstoppen Chart	1
Swedish Tio i Topp Chart	1
Swiss Hitparade	2
UK Record Retailer Chart	1
US Billboard Hot 100	1
US Cash Box Top 100	1
West German Musikmarkt Hit-Parade	1

=== Year-end charts ===
Chart (1967)	Rank
Canadian RPM 100	17

Chart (1968)	Rank
Australian Go-Set National Top 40	38
Austrian Singles	17
Belgian Singles	46
Canadian RPM 100	30
Dutch Singles	60

== Certifications and sales ==
Region	Certification	Certified units/sales
Denmark (IFPI Danmark)	Silver	50,000
France	—	200,000
Netherlands	—	100,000
United Kingdom	—	500,000
United States (RIAA)	Gold	1,000,000^{^}
Summaries
Worldwide	—	2,000,000
^{^} Shipments figures based on certification alone.
