= Get Back (film) =

Video by Paul McCartney
- Released: 25 October 1991
- Recorded: 1989–1990
- Genre: Rock
- Length: 85 min.
- Label: MPL
- Director: Richard Lester
- Producer: Henry Thomas; Philip Knatchbull

Paul McCartney chronology
Give My Regards to Broad Street (1984)	Get Back (1991)	Paul Is Live – The New World Tour (1994)

Get Back is a 1991 concert film starring Paul McCartney that documents the Paul McCartney World Tour of 1989–1990. The film was directed by Richard Lester, who had already directed A Hard Day's Night (1964) and Help! (1965). Carolco Pictures and New Line Cinema produced the film through the Seven Arts joint venture.

== Performances ==
All songs by Lennon–McCartney, except where noted.

1. "Band on the Run" (Paul and Linda McCartney)
2. "Got to Get You into My Life"
3. "Rough Ride" (McCartney)
4. "The Long and Winding Road"
5. "The Fool on the Hill"
6. "Sgt. Pepper's Lonely Hearts Club Band"
7. "Good Day Sunshine"
8. "I Saw Her Standing There"
9. "Put It There" (McCartney)
10. "Eleanor Rigby"
11. "Back in the U.S.S.R."
12. "This One" (McCartney)
13. "Can't Buy Me Love"
14. "Coming Up" (McCartney)
15. "Let It Be"
16. "Live and Let Die" (Paul and Linda McCartney)
17. "Hey Jude"
18. "Yesterday"
19. "Get Back"
20. "Golden Slumbers"
21. "Carry That Weight"
22. "The End"
23. "Birthday" (audio only)
