= Tripping the Live Fantastic =

Live album by Paul McCartney
- Released: 5 November 1990
- Recorded: 26 September 1989 – 30 June 1990
- Genre: Rock
- Length: 138:20
- Label: Parlophone
- Producer: Paul McCartney; Bob Clearmountain; Peter Henderson

Paul McCartney chronology
Flowers in the Dirt (1989)	Tripping the Live Fantastic (1990)	Unplugged (The Official Bootleg) (1991)

Singles from Tripping the Live Fantastic
- 1. "Birthday" Released: 8 October 1990; 2. "The Long and Winding Road" Released: 1990; 3. "All My Trials" Released: 26 November 1990

Professional ratings
Review scores
Source	Rating
AllMusic	2/5 stars
Encyclopedia of Popular Music	2/5 stars
The Essential Rock Discography	4/10
MusicHound	2.5/5
The Rolling Stone Album Guide	3/5 stars

Tripping the Live Fantastic is Paul McCartney's first official solo live album and his first release of concert material since Wings' 1976 Wings over America live package. Recorded during the Paul McCartney World Tour (1989–1990), it was released in early November 1990 as triple LP, double cassette and double CD. Tripping the Live Fantastic reached number 17 in the UK and number 26 in the US. An abridged version of the album, entitled Tripping the Live Fantastic: Highlights!, was released in the end of November.

== Overview ==
A document of the Paul McCartney World Tour, McCartney's first solo concert series, Tripping the Live Fantastic encompasses his entire musical career from his Beatles songs to his then most recent album, Flowers in the Dirt, while also including some unique covers; interspersed throughout are occasional soundcheck recordings as well.

The title is an allusion to the phrase "tripping the light fantastic", meaning to dance or move to musical accompaniment, originally from the poem L'Allegro by John Milton.

Although he had reversed the Lennon–McCartney credits on Wings over America in 1976, McCartney left the credits for his Beatles songs on Tripping the Live Fantastic in their original form.

Several songs from the tour were released as singles' b-sides and not found on the album: "Birthday" single featured "Good Day Sunshine", "P.S. Love Me Do" and "Let 'Em In"; "The Long and Winding Road" featured "C Moon" and "Mull of Kintyre"; and "All My Trials" additionally featured a medley of "Strawberry Fields Forever", "Help!" and "Give Peace a Chance".

=== Tripping the Live Fantastic: Highlights! ===
Three weeks after the release of the album, an abridged version titled Tripping the Live Fantastic: Highlights! was released as 17 track CD and 12 track LP.

Showcasing just the concert highlights, this set is notable for the exclusive inclusion of "All My Trials", not found on the original release. However, on the American edition of the album the track was replaced by "Put It There".

Not charting at all in the UK, Tripping the Live Fantastic: Highlights! reached number 141 in the US on the Billboard 200 and, proving to be a sustained seller, went platinum. The original set peaked at number 26 and failed to go gold.

== Related video releases ==
Paul McCartney: Put It There

A video produced in 1989, titled Paul McCartney: Put It There, featured McCartney and his band rehearsing for the tour.

Paul McCartney: Going Home

The Disney Channel filmed Paul McCartney: Going Home during the tour. The show highlights McCartney's return to Liverpool where he introduced a tribute to John Lennon, featured on the B-side of the "All My Trials" single, comprising "Strawberry Fields Forever", "Help!", and "Give Peace a Chance".

Get Back

A VHS concert film was also released, entitled Get Back. The video was directed by Richard Lester, the director of A Hard Day's Night and Help! It was his final project before his retirement.

== Track listing ==
All songs by Paul McCartney, except where noted.

=== Tripping the Live Fantastic ===
Disc One
No.	Title	Writer(s)	Notes	Length
1.	"Showtime"			0:38
2.	"Figure of Eight"		Recorded in Rotterdam, Netherlands, 10 November 1989.	5:32
3.	"Jet"	P. McCartney; Linda McCartney	Recorded in Wembley, London, England, 17 January 1990.	4:02
4.	"Rough Ride"		Recorded in Paris, 10 October 1989.	4:48
5.	"Got to Get You into My Life"	Lennon–McCartney	Recorded in Dortmund, Germany, 17 October 1989.	3:21
6.	"Band on the Run"	P. McCartney; L. McCartney	Recorded in Wembley, London, England, 16 January 1990.	5:09
7.	"Birthday"	J. Lennon; P. McCartney	Concurrently released as a single to commemorate what would have been John Lennon's 50th birthday, recorded in Knebworth, England, 30 June 1990.	2:43
8.	"Ebony and Ivory"		Recorded in Rotterdam, Netherlands, 8 November 1989.	4:00
9.	"We Got Married"		Recorded in Wembley, London, England, 16 January 1990.	6:38
10.	"Inner City Madness"	P. McCartney; L. McCartney; Hamish Stuart; Robbie McIntosh; Paul Wickens; Chris Whitten	Soundcheck by McCartney and his touring band, recorded in Birmingham, England, 2 January 1990.	1:22
11.	"Maybe I'm Amazed"		Recorded in Rotterdam, Netherlands, 8 November 1989.	4:41
12.	"The Long and Winding Road"	J. Lennon; P. McCartney	Recorded in Rio de Janeiro, Brazil, 19 April 1990.	4:18
13.	"Crackin' Up"	Ellas McDaniel	Recorded in Los Angeles, United States, 23 November 1989.	0:49
14.	"The Fool on the Hill"	J. Lennon; P. McCartney	Recorded in Wembley, London, England, 13 January 1990.	5:01
15.	"Sgt. Pepper's Lonely Hearts Club Band"	J. Lennon; P. McCartney	Recorded in Los Angeles, US, 23 November 1989.	6:23
16.	"Can't Buy Me Love"	J. Lennon; P. McCartney	Recorded in Munich, Germany, 21 October 1989.	2:14
17.	"Matchbox"	Carl Perkins	Recorded in Wembley, London, England, 21 January 1990.	3:09
18.	"Put It There"		Recorded in Gothenburg, Sweden, 28 September 1989. Contains the outro part of the Beatles' "Hello Goodbye".	2:43
19.	"Together"		Soundcheck, recorded in Chicago, US, 5 December 1989.	2:17
Total length:				69:48

Disc Two
No.	Title	Writer(s)	Notes	Length
1.	"Things We Said Today"	Lennon–McCartney	Recorded in Madrid, Spain, 2 November 1989.	5:01
2.	"Eleanor Rigby"	J. Lennon; P. McCartney	Recorded in Worcester, Massachusetts, 8 February 1990.	2:36
3.	"This One"		Recorded in Detroit, US, 1 February 1990.	4:28
4.	"My Brave Face"	P. McCartney; Declan MacManus	Recorded in Wembley, London, England, 19 January 1990.	3:09
5.	"Back in the U.S.S.R."	J. Lennon; P. McCartney	Recorded in Tokyo, Japan, 5 March 1990.	3:15
6.	"I Saw Her Standing There"	J. Lennon; P. McCartney	Recorded in Montreal, Canada, 9 December 1989.	3:25
7.	"Twenty Flight Rock"	Eddie Cochran; Ned Fairchild	Recorded in Wembley, London, England, 13 January 1990.	3:09
8.	"Coming Up"		Recorded in Tokyo, Japan, 3 March 1990.	5:18
9.	"Sally"	Will E. Haines; Harry Leon; Leo Towers; Ned Fairchild	Recorded in Wembley, London, England, 21 January 1990.	2:03
10.	"Let It Be"	J. Lennon; P. McCartney	Recorded in Miami, US, 14 April 1990.	3:53
11.	"Ain't That a Shame"	Fats Domino; Dave Bartholomew	Recorded in Tokyo, Japan, 9 March 1990.	2:40
12.	"Live and Let Die"	P. McCartney; L. McCartney	Recorded in Gothenburg, Sweden, 28 September 1989.	3:11
13.	"If I Were Not upon the Stage"	Thomas Sutton; Bill Turner; Stan Bowsher	A faux beginning to the next song, recorded in Cincinnati, US, 12 February 1990. (N.B. Booklet has incorrect date of 26 September 1989)	0:36
14.	"Hey Jude"	J. Lennon; P. McCartney	Recorded in Cincinnati, US, 12 February 1990.	8:03
15.	"Yesterday"	J. Lennon; P. McCartney	Recorded in Worcester, Massachusetts, 9 February 1990.	2:06
16.	"Get Back"	J. Lennon; P. McCartney	Recorded in Tokyo, Japan 13 March 1990.	4:11
17.	"Golden Slumbers/Carry That Weight/The End"	J. Lennon; P. McCartney	Recorded in Toronto, Canada, 7 December 1989.	6:41
18.	"Don't Let the Sun Catch You Crying"	Joe Greene	Recorded in Montreal, Canada, 9 December 1989.	4:31
Total length:				68:16

=== Tripping the Live Fantastic: Highlights! ===
No.	Title	Writer(s)	Notes	Length
1.	"Got to Get You into My Life"		Not available on vinyl	3:15
2.	"Birthday"			2:43
3.	"We Got Married"		Not available on vinyl	7:09
4.	"The Long and Winding Road"			3:48
5.	"Sgt. Pepper's Lonely Hearts Club Band"			6:21
6.	"Can't Buy Me Love"			2:14
7.	"All My Trials" "Put It There"	Traditional, arr. McCartney	US only	3:14; 2:44
8.	"Things We Said Today"		Not available on vinyl	5:01
9.	"Eleanor Rigby"			2:36
10.	"My Brave Face"			3:09
11.	"Back in the U.S.S.R."		Not available on vinyl	3:15
12.	"I Saw Her Standing There"			3:25
13.	"Coming Up"			5:18
14.	"Let It Be"			3:53
15.	"Hey Jude"			8:03
16.	"Get Back"			4:11
17.	"Golden Slumbers"/"Carry That Weight"/"The End"		Not available on vinyl	6:41

== Personnel ==
- Paul McCartney – lead vocals, acoustic, electric and bass guitars, piano, keyboards
- Linda McCartney – keyboards, backing vocals
- Hamish Stuart – acoustic, electric and bass guitars, backing vocals, lead vocals on "Ebony and Ivory"
- Robbie McIntosh – electric guitars, backing vocals
- Paul 'Wix' Wickens – keyboards, backing vocals
- Chris Whitten – drums, percussion

== Charts ==
=== Weekly charts ===
Tripping the Live Fantastic

Chart	Peak position
Australian Albums (ARIA)	86
Canadian RPM Albums Chart	33
Hungarian Albums (MAHASZ)	35
Japanese Oricon Albums Chart	12
Spanish Albums Chart	8
UK Albums Chart	17
US Billboard 200	26

Tripping the Live Fantastic – Highlights!

Chart	Peak position
Dutch Mega Albums Chart	35
German Media Control Albums Chart	23
New Zealand Albums Chart	21
Norwegian VG-lista Albums Chart	18
Swedish Albums Chart	27
Swiss Albums Chart	27
US Billboard 200	141

=== Certifications ===
Tripping the Live Fantastic

Region	Certification	Certified units/sales
Spain (Promusicae)	Platinum	100,000^{^}
United Kingdom (BPI)	Gold	100,000^{^}
^{^} Shipments figures based on certification alone.

Tripping the Live Fantastic – Highlights!

Region	Certification	Certified units/sales
United States (RIAA)	Platinum	1,000,000^{^}
^{^} Shipments figures based on certification alone.
