= Figure of Eight (song) =

Single by Paul McCartney

from the album Flowers in the Dirt
- B-side: "Où est le Soleil?"
- Released: 13 November 1989
- Recorded: 9 November 1987
- Studio: Hog Hill Mill (Icklesham, UK)
- Genre: Rock
- Length: 3:25 (album version); 5:11 (single version)
- Label: Parlophone
- Songwriter: Paul McCartney
- Producers: Chris Hughes; Paul McCartney; Ross Cullum

Paul McCartney singles chronology
"Où est le Soleil?" (1989)	"Figure of Eight" (1989)	"Put It There" (1990)

"Figure of Eight" is a song from Paul McCartney's 1989 album, Flowers in the Dirt.

== Single version ==
After the completion of the album, McCartney recorded a new version for single release, using his newly formed touring band. The new version is unusual in running nearly two minutes longer than the album version, rather than following the typical radio edit pattern of shortening the track for single release. Some versions of the single included an edit of the new version.

Despite this quirk, the single—which was released in seven formats including a 7", a 12", a cassingle, a CD and a 3" CD single—reached number 42 on the UK singles chart and number 92 on the Billboard Hot 100.

On various editions the single was labeled "Figure Of Eight" / "Ou Est le Soleil?" making it as double A-side.

== Other versions ==
"Figure of Eight" was the opening song throughout McCartney's 1989–1990 world concert tour. A version recorded in Rotterdam on 10 November 1989 appeared on the live album from the tour, Tripping the Live Fantastic.

== Music video ==
The official music video for the song was directed by Andy Morahan and shows footage from the concert at Hallenstadion in Zurich, Switzerland on October 29, 1989..

== Track listings ==
All tracks written by Paul McCartney except "The Long and Winding Road" written by McCartney / Lennon

7" single

1. "Figure of Eight" – 5:16
2. "Où Est le Soleil?" – 4:50

7" promo single

1. "Figure of Eight" (7" edit) – 3:59
2. "Où Est le Soleil?" – 3:57

CD, 3" CD single

1. "Figure of Eight" (7" edit) – 4:04
2. "The Long and Winding Road" – 3:54
3. "Loveliest Thing" – 3:59

12" single

1. "Figure of Eight" – 5:11
2. "The Long and Winding Road" – 3:51
3. "Loveliest Thing" – 3:58

12" single

1. "Figure of Eight" – 5:16
2. "This One" (Club Lovejoys mix) – 6:10

12" single

1. "Figure of Eight" – 5:16
2. "Où Est le Soleil?" (remix by Shep Pettibone) – 7:10
3. "Où Est le Soleil?" (Tub Dub mix) (remix by Shep Pettibone) – 4:30

Cassette, Limited edition one sided 12" single

1. "Figure of Eight" – 5:16
2. "Où Est le Soleil?" – 4:50

3" Special collector's CD single

1. "Figure of Eight" – 5:13
2. "Rough Ride" (Extended Version) – 4:54
3. "Où Est le Soleil?" (7" mix) – 4:50

== Personnel ==
Personnel are taken from the Flowers in the Dirt Archive Collection LP liner notes

- Paul McCartney – lead vocals, harmony vocals, bass, celesta, electric guitar, acoustic guitar, tambourine, handclaps
- Linda McCartney – synthesizer, handclaps
- Chris Whitten – drums, handclaps
- Trevor Horn – keyboards, handclaps
- Stephen Lipson – guitar

== Charts ==
Chart (1989)	Peak position
Canada Top Singles (RPM)	75
Ireland	25
Italy Airplay (Music & Media)	9
Netherlands (Dutch Top 40)	42
UK Singles (Official Charts)	42
US Billboard Hot 100	92
US Adult Contemporary (Billboard)	47
US Mainstream Rock (Billboard)	8
