= All My Trials =

Folk song by Bob Gibson

Song by Bob Gibson

from the album Offbeat Folksongs
- Released: 1956
- Genre: American folk song
- Label: Riverside
- Songwriter: Unknown

"All My Trials" is a folk song which became popular during the social protest movements of the late 1950s and 1960s. Alternative titles it has been recorded under include "Bahamian Lullaby" and "All My Sorrows." The origins of the song are unclear, as it appears to not have been documented in any musicological or historical records (such as the Roud Folk Song Index, Archive of American Folk Song, or an ethnomusicologist's field recordings or notes) until after the first commercial recording was released (as "Bahamian Lullaby") on Bob Gibson's 1956 debut album Offbeat Folksongs.

== History ==
In the first commercial release on the 1956 album Offbeat Folksongs, Gibson did not mention the history of the song. The next two artists to release it, Cynthia Gooding (as "All My Trials" in 1957) and Billy Faier (as "Bahaman Lullaby" in 1959), both wrote in their albums' liner notes that they each learned the song from Erik Darling. Gooding explained it was "supposed to be a white spiritual that went to the British West Indies and returned with the lovely rhythm of the Islands," presumably as told to her by Darling. Faier wrote that he heard Darling sing the song "four or five times in spring 1954," when Darling would have been performing with his folk group The Tarriers. However, bibliographic folk song indexes, such as the Traditional Ballad Index do not mention the Bahamas as an origin, listing it as unknown.

The Joan Baez Songbook (published 1964; Baez released the song as "All My Trials" in 1960) suggests it began as a pre–Civil War era American Southern gospel song, which was introduced to the Bahamas where it became a lullaby, and was forgotten in the US until it was brought back from the Bahamas and popularized during the roots revival.

== Paul McCartney version ==
"All My Trials"

Single by Paul McCartney

from the album Tripping the Live Fantastic: Highlights!
- B-side: "C Moon"
- Released: 26 November 1990
- Recorded: 27 October 1989
- Venue: Palatrussardi, Via Antonio Sant'Elia
- Genre: Rock
- Label: Parlophone
- Songwriters: Traditional, arranged by McCartney

Paul McCartney singles chronology
"The Long and Winding Road" (1990)	"All My Trials" (1990)	"Hope of Deliverance" (1992)

Paul McCartney issued the song as a single from the "Highlights" version of the Tripping the Live Fantastic live album.

Two versions of the CD single were released, having white and black covers. The b-sides of the black cover single are identical to "The Long and Winding Road" single, while the white cover single features an exclusive John Lennon tribute medley recorded in Liverpool on 28 June 1990.

The single debuted at No. 35 in December 1990 and spent six weeks on the UK Singles Chart.

=== Track listings ===
- 7-inch
1. "All My Trials" – 3:21
2. "C Moon" – 3:39
- White cover CD
1. "All My Trials" – 3:21
2. "C Moon" – 3:39
3. "Strawberry Fields Forever / Help / Give Peace a Chance" – 6:46
- Black cover CD
1. "All My Trials" – 3:21
2. "C Moon" – 3:39
3. "Mull Of Kintyre" – 5:35
4. "Put It There" – 2:34

== Other charted versions ==
- In February 1964, Dick and Dee Dee's debuted at No. 89 on the Billboard Hot 100 and stayed on the chart for three weeks.
- In August 1971, Ray Stevens released a version of the song which stayed on the Hot 100 for six weeks, peaking at No. 70 and stayed on the Easy Listening charts for eight weeks, peaking at No. 6.

== Other versions ==
- The song was recorded numerous times by folk artists, including Harry Belafonte, Bob Gibson, Pete Seeger, Dave Van Ronk, Anita Carter, Joan Baez, the Seekers, Peter, Paul and Mary, Nick and Gabrielle Drake, and the Kelly Family among many others.
- Another version of the song, "All My Sorrows", was made popular by the Kingston Trio, who recorded it in 1959, followed by the Shadows in 1961 and the Searchers in 1963 on Sugar and Spice
- The melody and chord changes were used as the basis of the Brandywine Singers' "Summer's Come and Gone" (Billboard No. 129, 1963).
- Swedish folk group The Hootenanny Singers released a Swedish-language version titled "Stanna en stund" ("Pause for a moment") in 1964.
- A fragment of the song is used in the Mickey Newbury medley "An American Trilogy", also performed by Elvis Presley.
- Fleetwood Mac guitarist Lindsey Buckingham did his own arrangement of the Kingston Trio's "All My Sorrows" on his 1992 solo album Out of the Cradle.
- Pop-rock artist Cerys Matthews released the song on her debut solo album Cockahoop in 2003.
- Swedish folk duo First Aid Kit released a version as a bonus track on their 2010 album The Big Black and the Blue.
- Syrian-American musician Bedouine released a single version "All My Trials" in 2020.
- Words exist to the tune in French (La fin du voyage [journey's end]) and German (Am Ziel meiner Reise [my journey's goal]); Nana Mouskouri has recorded all three (English in 1985, the other two in 1984).
