= Birthday (Beatles song) =

1968 Lennon-McCartney track from the White Album

- Cover of the Maclen Music sheet music

Song by the Beatles

from the album The Beatles
- Released: 22 November 1968
- Recorded: 18 September 1968
- Studio: EMI, London
- Genre: Hard rock; rock and roll
- Length: 2:42
- Label: Apple
- Songwriter: Lennon–McCartney
- Producer: Chris Thomas (credited to George Martin)

"Birthday" is a song by the English rock band the Beatles from their 1968 double album The Beatles (also known as "the White Album"). Written by John Lennon and Paul McCartney, mainly by McCartney, it is the opening track on the third side of the LP (or the second disc in CD versions of the record). Surviving Beatles Paul McCartney and Ringo Starr performed it for Starr's 70th birthday at Radio City Music Hall on 7 July 2010.

== Writing ==
The song was largely written during a recording session at EMI Studios on 18 September 1968 by John Lennon and Paul McCartney. McCartney: "We thought, 'Why not make something up?' So we got a riff going and arranged it around this riff. So that is 50–50 John and me, made up on the spot and recorded all in the same evening." During the session, the Beatles and the recording crew made a short trip around the corner to McCartney's house to watch the 1956 rock & roll movie The Girl Can't Help It which was being shown for the first time on British television. After the movie they returned to record "Birthday".

George Martin was away so his assistant Chris Thomas produced the session. His memory is that the song was mostly McCartney's: "Paul was the first one in, and he was playing the 'Birthday' riff. Eventually the others arrived, by which time Paul had literally written the song, right there in the studio." Everyone in the studio sang in the chorus and it was 5 am by the time the final mono mix was completed.

Lennon said in his Playboy interview in 1980: "'Birthday' was written in the studio. Just made up on the spot. I think Paul wanted to write a song like 'Happy Birthday Baby', the old fifties hit. But it was sort of made up in the studio. It was a piece of garbage."

"Birthday" begins with an intro drum fill, then moves directly into a blues progression in A (in the form of a guitar riff doubled by the bass) with McCartney singing at the top of his chest voice with Lennon on a lower harmony. After this section, a drum break lasting eight measures brings the song into the middle section, which rests entirely on the dominant. A repeat of the blues progression/guitar riff instrumental section, augmented by piano brings the song into a bridge before returning to a repeat of the first vocal section, this time with the piano accompaniment.

== Legacy ==
Coinciding with the 50th anniversary of its release, Jacob Stolworthy of The Independent listed "Birthday" at number 17 in his ranking of the White Album's 30 tracks. He wrote of the song: "The opening to the second-half [of the album] treads familiar Beatles ground with an improvised riff that could be the record's biggest earworm. Hilariously, Lennon would go on to call [the song] 'garbage'."

== Personnel ==
According to the book accompanying the 2018 box set The Beatles: Super Deluxe Version, the annotation on the tape box from the session offers an alternative line-up that "explodes some myths of who played what":

- Paul McCartney – lead vocal, bass, piano
- John Lennon – vocals, guitar
- George Harrison – guitar, tambourine
- Ringo Starr – drums, handclaps

Additional personnel

- Pattie Boyd – backing vocal
- Yoko Ono – backing vocal
- Mal Evans – handclaps

== Paul McCartney live version ==
"Birthday"

Single by Paul McCartney

from the album Tripping the Live Fantastic
- B-side: "Good Day Sunshine"
- Released: 8 October 1990 (UK); 16 October 1990 (US)
- Recorded: 30 June 1990
- Venue: Knebworth House, Knebworth
- Genre: Rock
- Length: 2:52
- Label: Parlophone (UK); Capitol (US)
- Songwriter: Lennon–McCartney
- Producers: Paul McCartney; Bob Clearmountain; Peter Henderson

Paul McCartney singles chronology
"Put It There" (1990)	"Birthday" (1990)	"All My Trials" (1990)

Paul McCartney released a live version on 8 October 1990 in the UK, with a US release albeit only as a cassette on 16 October. Originally appearing on Tripping the Live Fantastic, the single reached number 29 on the UK Singles Chart and number 3 in Italy. The B-side was a live version of "Good Day Sunshine". McCartney also released a 12" single and CD single with those songs and two more live tracks, "P.S. Love Me Do" and "Let 'Em In". "P.S. Love Me Do" is a combination of "P.S. I Love You" and "Love Me Do".

=== Charts ===
Chart (1990)	Peak position
Canada (RPM Top 100)	89
Europe (Eurochart Hot 100)	75
Ireland	22
Italy (Musica e dischi)	3
Japan (Oricon)	62
Netherlands (Single Top 100)	68
UK Singles (Official Charts)	29
US Mainstream Rock Airplay (Billboard)	35

== Other versions ==
Underground Sunshine recorded the song as a single in 1969. Their version was a minor hit in the US, reaching number 19 on the Cash Box chart, number 26 on the Billboard Hot 100, and number 35 in Canada.

Paul Weller covered the song for McCartney's 70th birthday. This version was available for download on 18 June 2012 for one day only. Even with this limited mode of distribution, the track reached number 64 on the UK Singles Chart.

== See also ==
- List of birthday songs
