= Underground Sunshine =

American psychedelic rock band

- Origin: Montello, Wisconsin
- Genres: Psychedelic rock; psychedelic pop
- Years active: 1969-1970
- Label: Mercury Records
- Spinoff of: The Entrance of Sound
- Past members: Berty Kohl (née Koelbl); Frank Kohl (née Koelbl); Chris Connors; Jane Little

Underground Sunshine was an American psychedelic rock band from Montello, Wisconsin. The group's only hit single came in 1969 with their cover of The Beatles' "Birthday".

In 1969, brothers Berty (vocals, bass) and Frank (drums) Kohl (née Koelbl) and friend Chris Connors (lead guitar) were performing in a group known as The Entrance To Sound. A local DJ by the name of Jonathan Little took an interest in the group and would be responsible for adding his sister, Jane Little (keyboards), to the band.

The group scored a hit single with their cover of The Beatles' song "Birthday" which hit #19 on the Cash Box charts and #26 on the Billboard Hot 100. It was recorded and distributed under the Mercury Records label.

The group subsequently appeared on American Bandstand and released a full-length album, Let There Be Light. The album hit No. 161 on the U.S. Billboard 200 chart, but their second single, "Don't Shut Me Out" (written by David Gates, later of Bread), just missed the charts. In 1970, they released two singles, "Nine to Five (Ain't My Bag)" and "Jesus Is Just Alright"; neither charted, and the group broke up soon after.

== Discography ==
=== Albums ===
- Let There Be Light (Intrepid, 1969)

=== Singles ===
- "Birthday" / "All I Want Is You" (Earth, 1969)
- "Birthday" / "All I Want Is You" (Intrepid, 1969)
- "Don't Shut Me Out" / "Take Me, Break Me" (Intrepid, 1969)
- "Jesus Is Just Alright" / "Six O'Clock" (Intrepid, 1969)
- "9 To 5 (Ain't My Bag)" / "Rotten Woman Blues" (Intrepid, 1969)
