= The Paul McCartney World Tour =

1989–1990 concert tour by Paul McCartney

- Debut tour by Paul McCartney
- Cover of the tour booklet
- Location: Europe • North America • South America
- Associated album: Flowers in the Dirt
- Start date: 26 September 1989
- End date: 29 July 1990
- Legs: 9
- No. of shows: 103

Paul McCartney concert chronology
- The Paul McCartney World Tour (1989–90); Unplugged Tour 1991 (1991)

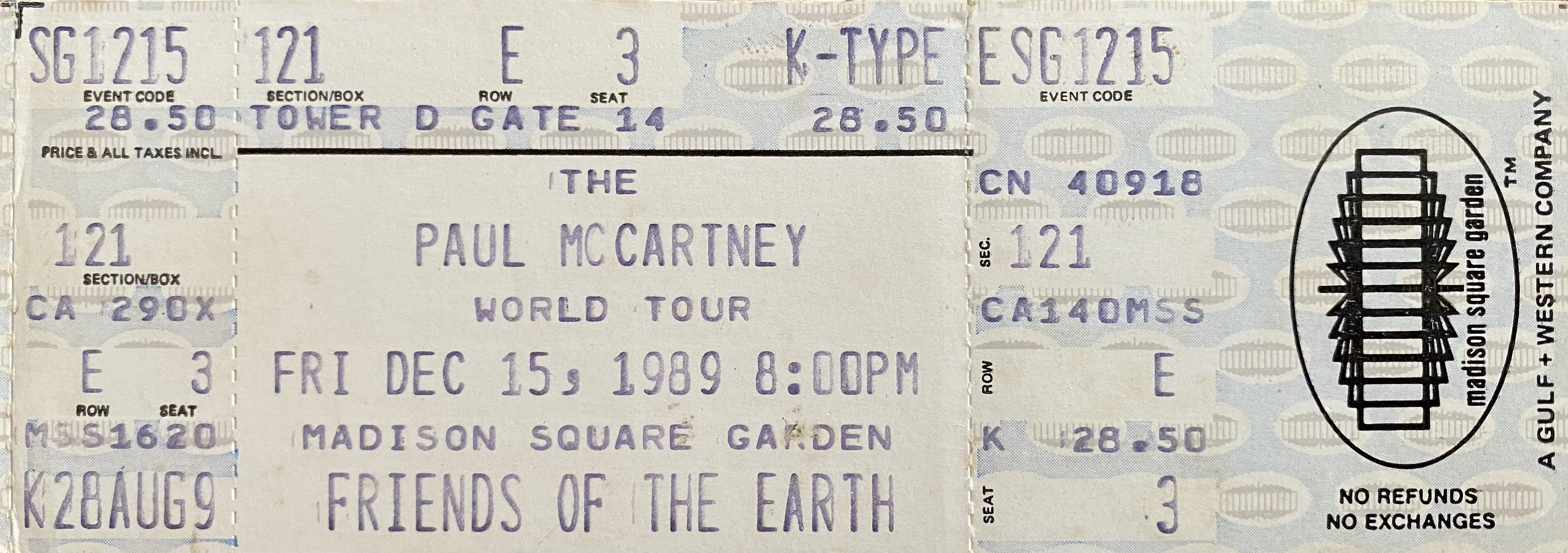
Concert ticket for 15 December 1989

The Paul McCartney World Tour was a worldwide concert tour by Paul McCartney, notable for being McCartney's first tour under his own name, and for the monumental painted stage sets by artist Brian Clarke. The 103-gig tour, which ran from 1989 through 1990, included a concert played to what was then the largest stadium crowd in the history of rock and roll.

== Tour ==
The tour was Paul McCartney's first world tour under his own name; it was also his first major tour outing in ten years, following the Wings UK Tour 1979, and his first world tour since the 1976 Wings Over the World Tour , both also with Linda McCartney.

While the tour coincided with the release of the solo album Flowers in the Dirt, and promoted that record by inclusion of its songs in the set list, the Paul McCartney World Tour has been characterised as thematically more about him embracing his Beatles past; for the first time in any of his tours, a substantial number of Beatles songs were featured in the set list.

The tour was documented by the 1990 live albums Tripping the Live Fantastic and Tripping the Live Fantastic: Highlights!, and the 1991 concert film Get Back. A one-hour tour documentary was also aired on Channel 4 in the UK, titled From Rio to Liverpool.

=== Set designs ===
The sets for the tour were designed by regular McCartney collaborator, the artist Brian Clarke, who together with Linda McCartney created the album cover for Flowers in the Dirt. The hand-painted stage set backdrops, notable for their scale, were executed under Clarke’s supervision by the scenic painters Elms Lesters, at the Los Angeles Painting Rooms. The scale designs for the tour, individual artworks by Clarke in acrylic and paper collage on Velin, were first publicly exhibited in 1990, at the Mayor Gallery in London. Elements from the sets appear as the graphic basis of much of the promotional material.

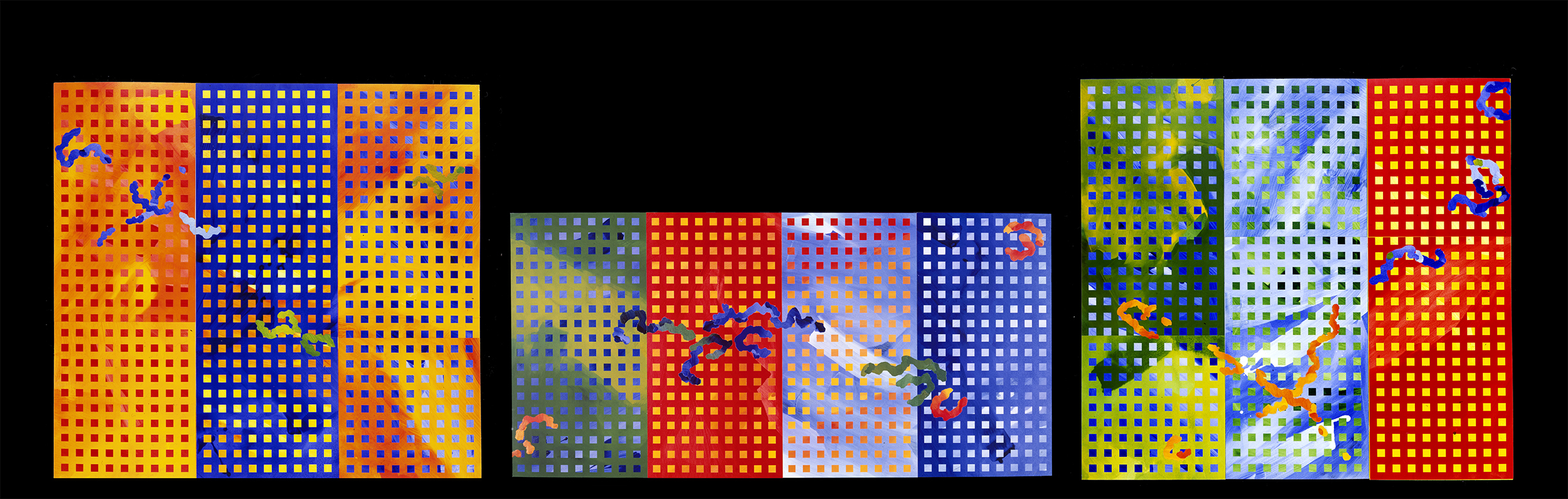
Brian Clarke’s painted and collaged set designs for the tour, showing the original backdrops for the arena concerts, and the additional wings designed for shows in larger stadiums.

=== Tour booklet ===
Concert attendees received, free of additional charge, a lavish 9x12-inch 98-me page booklet, containing the tour itinerary, lengthy profiles of the band members, descriptions of the tour's stage and logistics, and an extended description of Friends of the Earth's mission. Two-thirds of the booklet consisted of McCartney's reflections upon his life and career, illustrated by many photographs.

== Set list ==
The following set list is from the September 28, 1989 concert in Scandinavium, Gothenburg. It is not intended to represent all dates throughout the tour.

1. "Figure of Eight"
2. "Jet"
3. "Rough Ride"
4. "Got to Get You into My Life"
5. "Band on the Run"
6. "Ebony and Ivory"
7. "We Got Married"
8. "Maybe I'm Amazed"
9. "The Long and Winding Road"
10. "The Fool on the Hill"
11. "Sgt. Pepper's Lonely Hearts Club Band"
12. "Good Day Sunshine"
13. "Can't Buy Me Love"
14. "Put It There"
15. "Things We Said Today"
16. "Eleanor Rigby"
17. "This One"
18. "My Brave Face"
19. "Back in the U.S.S.R."
20. "I Saw Her Standing There"
21. "Twenty Flight Rock"
22. "Coming Up"
23. "Let It Be"
24. "Ain't That a Shame"
25. "Live and Let Die"
26. "Hey Jude"

Encore

27. "Yesterday"
28. "Get Back"
29. "Golden Slumbers"
30. "Carry That Weight"
31. "The End"

== Tour dates ==
List of 1989 concerts
Date	City	Country	Venue
26 September	Drammen	Norway	Drammenshallen
28 September	Gothenburg	Sweden	Scandinavium
29 September	Stockholm	Sweden	Isstadion
30 September	Stockholm	Sweden	Isstadion
3 October	Hamburg	West Germany	Alsterdorfer Sporthalle
4 October	Hamburg	West Germany	Alsterdorfer Sporthalle
6 October	Frankfurt	West Germany	Festhalle
7 October	Frankfurt	West Germany	Festhalle
9 October	Paris	France	Palais Omnisports de Paris-Bercy
10 October	Paris	France	Palais Omnisports de Paris-Bercy
11 October	Paris	France	Palais Omnisports de Paris-Bercy
16 October	Dortmund	West Germany	Westfalenhalle
17 October	Dortmund	West Germany	Westfalenhalle
20 October	Munich	West Germany	Olympiahalle
21 October	Munich	West Germany	Olympiahalle
22 October	Munich	West Germany	Olympiahalle
24 October	Rome	Italy	Palaeur
26 October	Milan	Italy	Palatrussardi
27 October	Milan	Italy	Palatrussardi
29 October	Zürich	Switzerland	Hallenstadion
30 October	Zürich	Switzerland	Hallenstadion
2 November	Madrid	Spain	Palacio de los Deportes
3 November	Madrid	Spain	Palacio de los Deportes
5 November	Lyon	France	Halle Tony Garnier
7 November	Rotterdam	Netherlands	Rotterdam Ahoy
8 November	Rotterdam	Netherlands	Rotterdam Ahoy
10 November	Rotterdam	Netherlands	Rotterdam Ahoy
11 November	Rotterdam	Netherlands	Rotterdam Ahoy
23 November	Inglewood	United States	Great Western Forum
24 November	Inglewood	United States	Great Western Forum
27 November	Inglewood	United States	Great Western Forum
28 November	Inglewood	United States	Great Western Forum
29 November	Inglewood	United States	Great Western Forum
3 December	Rosemont	United States	Rosemont Horizon
4 December	Rosemont	United States	Rosemont Horizon
5 December	Rosemont	United States	Rosemont Horizon
7 December	Toronto	Canada	SkyDome
9 December	Montreal	Canada	Montreal Forum
11 December	New York City	United States	Madison Square Garden
12 December	New York City	United States	Madison Square Garden
14 December	New York City	United States	Madison Square Garden
15 December	New York City	United States	Madison Square Garden

List of 1990 concerts
Date	City	Country	Venue
2 January	Birmingham	England	National Exhibition Centre
3 January	Birmingham	England	National Exhibition Centre
5 January	Birmingham	England	National Exhibition Centre
6 January	Birmingham	England	National Exhibition Centre
8 January	Birmingham	England	National Exhibition Centre
9 January	Birmingham	England	National Exhibition Centre
11 January	London	England	Wembley Arena
13 January	London	England	Wembley Arena
14 January	London	England	Wembley Arena
16 January	London	England	Wembley Arena
17 January	London	England	Wembley Arena
19 January	London	England	Wembley Arena
20 January	London	England	Wembley Arena
21 January	London	England	Wembley Arena
23 January	London	England	Wembley Arena
24 January	London	England	Wembley Arena
26 January	London	England	Wembley Arena
1 February	Auburn Hills	United States	The Palace of Auburn Hills
2 February	Auburn Hills	United States	The Palace of Auburn Hills
4 February	Pittsburgh	United States	Civic Arena
5 February	Pittsburgh	United States	Civic Arena
8 February	Worcester	United States	Worcester Centrum
9 February	Worcester	United States	Worcester Centrum
12 February	Cincinnati	United States	Riverfront Coliseum
14 February	Indianapolis	United States	Market Square Arena
15 February	Indianapolis	United States	Market Square Arena
18 February	Atlanta	United States	The Omni
19 February	Atlanta	United States	The Omni
3 March	Tokyo	Japan	Tokyo Dome
5 March	Tokyo	Japan	Tokyo Dome
7 March	Tokyo	Japan	Tokyo Dome
9 March	Tokyo	Japan	Tokyo Dome
11 March	Tokyo	Japan	Tokyo Dome
13 March	Tokyo	Japan	Tokyo Dome
29 March	Seattle	United States	Kingdome
31 March	Berkeley	United States	California Memorial Stadium
1 April	Berkeley	United States	California Memorial Stadium
4 April	Tempe	United States	Sun Devil Stadium
7 April	Irving	United States	Texas Stadium
9 April	Lexington	United States	Rupp Arena
12 April	Tampa	United States	Tampa Stadium
14 April	Miami Gardens	United States	Joe Robbie Stadium
15 April	Miami Gardens	United States	Joe Robbie Stadium
20 April	Rio de Janeiro	Brazil	Maracanã Stadium
21 April	Rio de Janeiro	Brazil	Maracanã Stadium
23 June	Glasgow	Scotland	S.E.C.C. Arena
28 June	Liverpool	England	King's Dock
30 June	Stevenage	England	Knebworth Park
4 July	Washington, D.C.	United States	RFK Stadium
6 July	Washington, D.C.	United States	RFK Stadium
9 July	East Rutherford	United States	Giants Stadium
11 July	East Rutherford	United States	Giants Stadium
14 July	Philadelphia	United States	Veterans Stadium
15 July	Philadelphia	United States	Veterans Stadium
18 July	Ames	United States	Cyclone Stadium
20 July	Cleveland	United States	Cleveland Stadium
22 July	Raleigh	United States	Carter–Finley Stadium
24 July	Foxborough	United States	Foxboro Stadium
26 July	Foxborough	United States	Foxboro Stadium
29 July	Chicago	United States	Soldier Field

== Box office score data ==
Venue	City	Tickets sold / available	Gross revenue
The Palace of Auburn Hills	Auburn Hills	35,294 / 35,294	$1,005,879
Civic Arena	Pittsburgh	29,365 / 29,365	$836,903
Worcester Centrum	Worcester	29,600 / 29,600	$728,545
Riverfront Coliseum	Cincinnati	14,545 / 14,545	$414,533
Market Square Arena	Indianapolis	30,650 / 30,650	$873,525
The Omni	Atlanta	29,784 / 29,784	$848,844
California Memorial Stadium	Berkeley	118,352 / 118,352	$3,550,560
Sun Devil Stadium	Tempe	66,546 / 66,546	$1,996,380
Texas Stadium	Irving	57,337 / 57,337	$1,863,453
Rupp Arena	Lexington	19,951 / 19,951	$568,604
Tampa Stadium	Tampa	58,241 / 58,241	$1,747,230
Joe Robbie Stadium	Miami Gardens	95,410 / 95,410	$2,862,300
RFK Stadium	Washington, D.C.	91,892 / 91,892	$2,756,760
Giants Stadium	East Rutherford	105,082 / 105,082	$3,415,165
Veterans Stadium	Philadelphia	102,695 / 102,695	$3,107,980
Cyclone Stadium	Ames	53,763 / 53,763	$1,747,298
Cleveland Stadium	Cleveland	66,476 / 66,476	$1,994,280
Carter–Finley Stadium	Raleigh	51,260 / 51,260	$1,537,800
Foxboro Stadium	Foxborough	85,938 / 85,938	$2,578,110
Soldier Field	Chicago	55,630 / 55,630	$1,807,975
Total		1,197,811 / 1,197,811 (100%)	$36,242,124

== Personnel ==
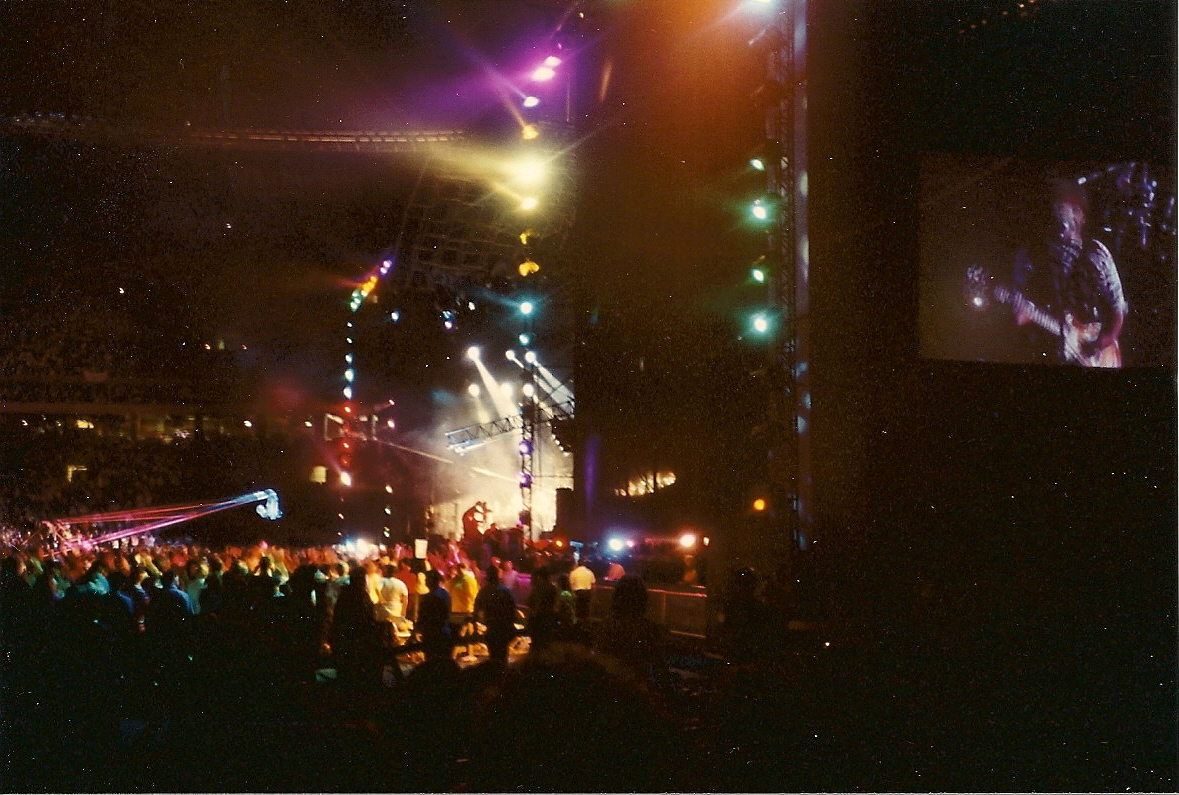
Outdoor stage and show, 14 July 1990 at Philadelphia's Veterans Stadium

- Paul McCartney – lead vocals, guitars (acoustic, electric and bass), keyboards
- Linda McCartney – backing vocals, keyboards, percussion
- Hamish Stuart – backing vocals, guitars (acoustic, electric and bass)
- Robbie McIntosh – backing vocals, electric guitar
- Paul "Wix" Wickens – backing vocals, keyboards
- Chris Whitten – drums, percussion

== See also ==
- List of most-attended concerts
