= Flowers in the Dirt =

Studio album by Paul McCartney
- Released: 5 June 1989
- Recorded: 1 October 1987 – 12 January 1989
- Studios: Hogg Hill Mill, Icklesham, UK; Olympic, London; AIR, London; Hot Nights Ltd., London; Mad Hatter, Los Angeles; Soundcastle, Los Angeles
- Genre: Rock
- Length: 53:42
- Labels: Parlophone (UK); Capitol (US)
- Producers: Paul McCartney; Mitchell Froom; Neil Dorfsman; Elvis Costello; Trevor Horn; Steve Lipson; Chris Hughes; Ross Cullum; David Foster; Phil Ramone (on CD reissue tracks)

Paul McCartney chronology
Сно́ва в СССР (1988)	Flowers in the Dirt (1989)	Tripping the Live Fantastic (1990)

Paul McCartney studio album chronology
Сно́ва в СССР (1988)	Flowers in the Dirt (1989)	Off the Ground (1993)

Singles from Flowers in the Dirt
- 1. "My Brave Face" Released: 8 May 1989; 2. "This One" Released: 17 July 1989 (UK); 3. "Où est le Soleil?" Released: July 1989 (US); 4. "Figure of Eight" Released: 13 November 1989; 5. "Put It There" Released: 5 February 1990

Flowers in the Dirt is the ninth solo studio album by the English musician Paul McCartney. The album was released on 5 June 1989 on Parlophone, as he was embarking on his first world tour since the Wings Over the World tour in 1975–76. It earned McCartney some of his best reviews for an album of original songs since Tug of War (1982). The album made number one in the United Kingdom and Norway and produced several hit singles (the first being "My Brave Face"). The album artwork was a collaboration between artist Brian Clarke, who painted the canvas and arranged the flowers, and Linda McCartney, who produced the cover photography.

The album was reissued in an expanded form under the Paul McCartney Archive Collection project in March 2017, with the original demos recorded by McCartney and Elvis Costello included as part of the release.

== Background and recording ==
After the meagre sales for Press to Play, Paul McCartney realised that he needed to work much harder on his follow-up. Thus, he not only teamed up with several different producers, but also spent the better part of 18 months perfecting Flowers in the Dirt. A highlight of the sessions was Paul McCartney's alliance with Elvis Costello, with whom he composed many new songs. In his 2015 autobiography, Unfaithful Music & Disappearing Ink, Costello described the track "That Day Is Done" as, "the unhappy sequel to 'Veronica'", which they had also co-written. Despite Costello's similarities to John Lennon, the partnership was not to endure. McCartney's then manager, Richard Ogden, confided at the time to Beatles historian Mark Lewisohn that the relationship between Costello and the former Beatle was "not entirely harmonious" and that at points McCartney had gone as far as to rant at him regarding Costello's attitude and approach to the sessions. Costello would appear on the album, even co-singing "You Want Her Too" with McCartney. Another guest included was his friend David Gilmour from Pink Floyd, who plays the guitar on "We Got Married".

The album was recorded in several sessions, mainly at Hogg Hill Mill Studio. Apart from "We Got Married", whose basic track had been recorded back in 1984, the first sessions for Flowers in the Dirt took place in October 1987, when two songs were recorded: “Rough Ride” and “Figure of Eight”. Both were co-produced by Steve Lipson and Trevor Horn.

The next sessions took place between January and March 1988. The band consisted of McCartney, Elvis Costello, Hamish Stuart (guitar), Kevin Armstrong (guitar) and Chris Whitten (drums). This line-up recorded nine songs co-written by McCartney and Costello, including "My Brave Face" (remade later), "You Want Her Too", "Don't Be Careless Love" and "That Day Is Done". However, some disagreements arose, and after a while, guitarist Kevin Armstrong left the project.

The next batch of sessions (April-May 1988) produced three more songs that would be part of the album ("Distractions", "Put It There" and "This One"). Other material from these sessions was later used as B-sides. On "Put It There", McCartney used an old Buddy Holly trick, the knee-percussion, that McCartney recorded on the same day as the backing track.

Between June and September, another group of sessions took place with Steve Lipson and Trevor Horn, resulting in the recordings of "How Many People" and "Ou Est le Soleil".

In October 1988, McCartney moved to Olympic Studios, where he reworked "My Brave Face" with producer Mitchell Froom and engineer Neil Dorfsman. Dorfsman later told author Luca Perasi: "We wanted to make it slightly edgier and pop-sounding, because we all thought it was a single."

The last song recorded was "Motor of Love" (January-February 1989). This was another remake, entrusted to producers Ross Cullum and Chris Hughes. Greg Hawkes played the keyboards and Fairlight synthesiser.

== Cover art ==
The album cover was conceived and designed by the McCartneys' friend and collaborator, the British artist Brian Clarke, who painted the background painting in oil on canvas. Clarke arranged the flowers and foliage and the cover was photographed by Linda McCartney. The two collaborated on multiple unique arrangements, resulting in Linda's series of Cibachrome images. Clarke was also responsible for designing stage sets and promotional material for the world tour which accompanied the album. A series of Flowers in the Dirt paintings and arrangements were made, and the full set of collaborative photographs that produced the cover artwork were exhibited that same year at the Mayor Gallery in London.

== Release ==
Professional ratings
Review scores
Source	Rating
AllMusic	3/5 stars
Deseret News	(highly favourable)
The Encyclopedia of Popular Music	3/5 stars
The Essential Rock Discography	6/10
Los Angeles Times	4/5 stars
MusicHound	3/5
The New York Times	(favourable)
Q	4/5 stars
Rolling Stone	4/5 stars
The Rolling Stone Album Guide	3/5 stars
Time	(favourable)

With the intention of launching the biggest tour of his career, McCartney assembled a band to take out on the road, and who would appear in various forms on Flowers in the Dirt. Hamish Stuart was best known for his tenure in Average White Band, while Robbie McIntosh had been a member of the Pretenders. Filling out the sound would be Chris Whitten on drums and Paul "Wix" Wickens joining McCartney's wife Linda McCartney on keyboards. The Paul McCartney World Tour opened on 26 September 1989 and featured concerts in Europe, North America, Japan and Brazil until the following July.

Finally, early in 1989, the project was ready for release. In May, the Beatlesque "My Brave Face" was released as a single and promptly gave McCartney a US hit, reaching number 25, while reaching number 18 in the UK. In June, Flowers in the Dirt was released to high anticipation and went to number 1 in the UK charts, garnering very positive reviews from all around. In the US, the reaction was better than Press to Play, with the album reaching number 21, staying on the charts for a year and going gold, though it still sold beneath expectations. The second single, "This One", also reached number 18 in the UK. The follow-ups "Figure of Eight"/"Où est le Soleil?" and "Put It There" would all be minor UK hits.

A limited-edition "World Tour Pack" of Flowers in the Dirt, sold in a facsimile trunk, was issued in Britain in October 1989, and America (with British catalogue numbers) in January 1990. The set included a bonus single of "Party Party" (mixed by Bruce Forest and released on a one-sided 7" single in vinyl editions of the "World Tour Pack" and a 3" CD-single in compact disc editions of the "World Tour Pack").

In March 1990, another limited edition of the album that featured a bonus disc with b-sides and exclusive track, studio version of "P.S. Love Me Do", was released exclusively in Japan and re-entered the country's chart.

== Critical reception ==
In a retrospective review for AllMusic, critic Stephen Thomas Erlewine wrote of the album: "Paul McCartney must not only have been conscious of his slipping commercial fortunes, he must have realised that his records hadn't been treated seriously for years, so he decided to make a full-fledged comeback effort with Flowers in the Dirt."

Writing for the Chicago Tribune, David Silverman wrote that the album was "a welcome, if not wholly fantastic, return from the fabbest of the Fab Four".

== Track listing ==
Side one
No.	Title	Writer(s)	Producer(s)	Length
1.	"My Brave Face"	Paul McCartney; Declan MacManus	McCartney; Mitchell Froom; Neil Dorfsman	3:18
2.	"Rough Ride"	McCartney	Trevor Horn; McCartney; Steve Lipson	4:43
3.	"You Want Her Too" (with Elvis Costello)	McCartney; MacManus	McCartney; Dorfsman; Froom; Costello	3:11
4.	"Distractions"	McCartney	McCartney	4:38
5.	"We Got Married"	McCartney	McCartney; David Foster	4:57
6.	"Put It There"	McCartney	McCartney	2:07

Side two
No.	Title	Writer(s)	Producer(s)	Length
1.	"Figure of Eight"	McCartney	Horn; McCartney; Lipson	3:25
2.	"This One"	McCartney	McCartney	4:10
3.	"Don't Be Careless Love"	McCartney; MacManus	McCartney; Costello; Froom	3:18
4.	"That Day Is Done"	McCartney; MacManus	McCartney; Costello; Dorfsman; Froom	4:19
5.	"How Many People"	McCartney	Horn; McCartney; Lipson	4:14
6.	"Motor of Love"	McCartney	Chris Hughes; McCartney; Ross Cullum	6:18

Additional CD and cassette track

No.	Title	Writer(s)	Producer(s)	Length
13.	"Ou est le Soleil?"	McCartney	Horn; McCartney; Lipson	4:45

Bonus single on the World Tour Pack edition

No.	Title	Writer(s)	Producer(s)	Length
1.	"Party Party"	Paul McCartney; Linda McCartney; Robbie McIntosh; Hamish Stuart; Chris Whitten; Paul "Wix" Wickens	McCartney	5:36

1990 Japanese special edition bonus disc
No.	Title	Writer(s)	Length
1.	"Message"		0:28
2.	"The Long and Winding Road"	McCartney–Lennon	3:51
3.	"Loveliest Thing"	McCartney	3:59
4.	"Rough Ride" (extended version)	McCartney	4:53
5.	"Ou Est Le Soleil?" (7" mix)	McCartney	4:50
6.	"Mama's Little Girl" (Paul McCartney & Wings)	McCartney	3:41
7.	"Same Time Next Year" (Paul McCartney & Wings)	McCartney	3:06
8.	"Party, Party"	Paul McCartney; Linda McCartney; Robbie McIntosh; Hamish Stuart; Chris Whitten; Paul "Wix" Wickens	5:35
9.	"P.S. Love Me Do"	Lennon–McCartney	3:40

== Reissues ==
A remastered CD was released in 1993 as part of The Paul McCartney Collection with three bonus tracks: "Back on My Feet", "Flying to My Home" and "Loveliest Thing".

=== Archive Collection reissue ===
The album was re-issued on 24 March 2017, by Capitol Music Group as the tenth release in the ongoing Paul McCartney Archive Collection. Formats included a two-disc (CD) Special Edition (the second disc included McCartney and Costello's demos recorded prior to the album's sessions), a two LP vinyl edition, and a three disc (CD) and DVD Deluxe Edition Box Set that featured previously unreleased demos, unseen archival videos, a notebook of Paul's handwritten lyrics and notes, Linda McCartney Flowers in the Dirt Exhibition Catalogue, and a 112-page hardcover book documenting the making of the album.

The album features the song "The Lovers That Never Were". Costello said of the song:

The real lost gem from that batch of songs – one of these days one of us should cut it – is "The Lovers That Never Were." In its original condition, it's like something Dusty Springfield or Jackie DeShannon would have recorded. Paul straightened it out in the studio [for 1993's Off the Ground album] and wanted it to go a different way, but the demo is, I'd say, one of the great vocal performances of his solo career. He's standing up playing a twelve-string guitar and, weirdly enough, I'm playing piano, just thinking, 'Don't fuck up! He's really singing this!' He's singing a ballad in the voice of "I'm Down"! He's right over my shoulder singing all this wild, distorted stuff! I had never heard him do that before.

"So Like Candy" and "Playboy to a Man" appear in finished versions on Elvis Costello's 1991 album Mighty Like a Rose.

- Special edition two-CD; the original 13-track album on the first disc, plus 9 bonus tracks of Paul and Elvis's previously unreleased original demos on a second disc;
- Best Buy special edition two-CD + 7-inch single; same as Special Edition with additional "My Brave Face" b/w "Flying to My Home" limited collectors 7-inch vinyl coloured single;
- Deluxe edition three-CD/one-DVD;
  - the original 13-track disc one remastered for all the new configurations at Abbey Road Studios;
  - 18 bonus audio tracks across two discs, featuring previously unreleased demos, written and performed by Paul with Elvis Costello;
  - three unheard cassette demos, as well as a collection of original B-sides, remixes and single edits as digital downloads only;
  - a 32-page notebook of Paul's handwritten lyrics and notes, a catalogue for Linda McCartney's 1989 Flowers in the Dirt photo exhibition, a 64-page photo book featuring the music videos for "This One", and a 112-page book telling the story of making of the album;
  - a DVD includes all the music videos from the album, three new short films with unseen archive material that show some of the creation process of the album and the documentary Put It There originally released on VHS in 1989;
  - an access to downloadable 24bit 96 kHz high-resolution audio versions of the remastered album and bonus audio tracks.
- Remastered vinyl two-album with a download card. The first album includes the remastered album but in keeping with the original vinyl release does not include "Où Est Le Soleil?" (this track is available with the accompanying digital download). The second album includes McCartney's and Costello's previously unreleased original demos;
- Digital download Digital album available as both standard and special versions.
- Record Store Day 2017 exclusive three-track cassette with demos of "I Don't Want to Confess", "Shallow Grave" and "Mistress and Maid" as in deluxe edition

Disc 1 The original 13-track album.

Disc 2 – Paul McCartney and Elvis Costello original demos
All songs written and performed by Paul McCartney and Declan McManus (Elvis Costello), as an acoustic duo.

1. "The Lovers That Never Were" – 3:58
2. "Tommy's Coming Home" – 4:09
3. "Twenty Fine Fingers" – 2:27
4. "So Like Candy" – 3:29
5. "You Want Her Too" – 2:40
6. "That Day Is Done" – 4:16
7. "Don't Be Careless Love" – 3:43
8. "My Brave Face" – 2:40
9. "Playboy to a Man" – 3:15
  - "The Lovers That Never Were" (Geoff Emerick mix) – 4:05

The Geoff Emerick mix of "The Lovers That Never Were" is a hidden bonus track.

Disc 3 – Paul McCartney and Elvis Costello 1988 demos
All songs written and performed by Paul McCartney and Declan McManus (Elvis Costello), with full band accompaniment.

1. "The Lovers That Never Were" – 3:50
2. "Tommy's Coming Home" – 5:03
3. "Twenty Fine Fingers" – 2:47
4. "So Like Candy" – 3:48
5. "You Want Her Too" – 3:20
6. "That Day Is Done" – 4:22
7. "Don't Be Careless Love" – 3:25
8. "My Brave Face" – 3:30
9. "Playboy to a Man" – 2:55

Disc 4 – DVD

Music videos

1. "My Brave Face"
2. "My Brave Face" (version 2)
3. "This One" (version 1)
4. "This One" (version 2)
5. "Figure of Eight"
6. "Party Party"
7. "Ou Est Le Soleil?"
8. "Put It There"
9. "Distractions"
10. "We Got Married"

Creating Flowers in the Dirt

1. Paul and Elvis
2. Buds in the Studio
3. The Making of "This One" (The Dean Chamberlain One)

Put It There

1. Put It There Documentary

Digital download only – original B-sides, remixes and single edits
All songs written by Paul McCartney except "Back on My Feet" written with Declan McManus (Elvis Costello), "The First Stone" written with Hamish Stuart, and "Party Party" written with Linda McCartney, Robbie McIntosh, Hamish Stuart, Chris Whitten, and Paul "Wix" Wickens.

1. "Back on My Feet" – 4:24
2. "Flying to My Home" – 4:15
3. "The First Stone" – 4:06
4. "Good Sign" – 6:59
5. "This One" (Club Lovejoys mix) – 6:11
6. "Figure of Eight" (12-inch Bob Clearmountain mix) – 5:14
7. "Loveliest Thing" – 4:03
8. "Ou Est Le Soleil?" (12-inch mix) – 7:06
9. "Ou Est Le Soleil?" (Tub Dub mix) – 4:30
10. "Ou Est Le Soleil?" (7-inch mix) – 4:53
11. "Ou Est Le Soleil?" (instrumental) – 4:29
12. "Party Party" (original mix) – 5:32
13. "Party Party" (club mix) – 6:21

Digital download only – Paul McCartney and Elvis Costello cassette demos
All songs written and performed by Paul McCartney and Declan McManus (Elvis Costello).

1. "I Don't Want to Confess" – 2:21
2. "Shallow Grave" – 2:14
3. "Mistress and Maid" – 2:29

Digital-only bonus tracks Available only on Paulmccartney.com

1. "Distractions" (demo) – 4:56
2. "This One" (demo) – 3:26
3. "Back on My Feet" (demo) – 3:23

== Personnel ==
- Paul McCartney – vocals (lead and backing), guitar (acoustic, bass guitar, electric, 12-string and Mexican), piano, synthesizer, drums, tambourine, percussion, celeste, sitar, wine glasses, harmonium, hand claps, finger snaps, mellotron, flugelhorn, bongos, keyboards, woodsaw, orchestration on "Put It There"
- Linda McCartney – Minimoog, backing vocals, hand claps
- Robbie McIntosh – guitar (acoustic and electric)
- Hamish Stuart – guitar (electric, acoustic and bass guitar), percussion, backing vocals
- Chris Whitten – drums, percussion, hand claps, synth drums
- Paul Wickens – keyboards
- Elvis Costello – vocals (backing and co-lead), keyboards
- David Gilmour – electric guitar on "We Got Married"
- Greg Hawkes – keyboards on "Motor of Love"
- David Foster – keyboards on "We Got Married"
- Dave Mattacks – drums on "We Got Married"
- Jerry Marotta - drums on "Don't Be Careless Love"
- Guy Barker – trumpet
- Stephen Lipson – computer & drum programming, guitar (electric and bass), keyboards
- Peter Henderson – computer programming
- Trevor Horn – keyboards, hand claps, backing vocals
- Nicky Hopkins – piano
- Mitchell Froom – keyboards
- David Rhodes – EBow guitar on "My Brave Face"
- Judd Lander – harmonica
- Chris Davis – saxophone
- Chris White – saxophone
- Dave Bishop – saxophone
- John Taylor – cornet
- Tony Goddard – cornet
- Ian Peters – euphonium
- Ian Harper – tenor horn
- Jah Bunny – tongue styley
- Eddie Klein – additional computer programming
- Clare Fischer – orchestral arrangement on "Distractions"
- George Martin – orchestration on "Put It There", with McCartney

== Accolades ==
=== Grammy Awards ===
Year	Nominee / work	Award	Result
1990	Flowers in the Dirt	Best Engineered Non-classical Album	Nominated

=== Brit Awards ===
Year	Nominee / work	Award	Result
1990	"My Brave Face"	Best Music Video	Nominated

== Charts ==
=== Weekly charts ===
Original album
Chart (1989/90)	Peak position
Australian ARIA Albums Chart	18
Austrian Albums Chart	18
Canadian RPM Albums Chart	16
Dutch Mega Albums	15
French SNEP Albums Chart	8
German Media Control Albums Chart	9
Japanese Oricon Weekly Albums Chart^{[A]}	9
Norwegian VG-lista Albums Chart	1
Swedish Albums Chart	2
Spanish Albums Chart	4
Swiss Albums Chart	13
UK Albums Chart	1
US Billboard 200	21

Reissue
Chart (2017)	Peak position
German Albums (Offizielle Top 100)	30
UK Albums Chart	41
US Billboard 200	33

=== Year-end charts ===
Chart (1989)	Position
Austrian Albums Chart	69
Canadian Albums Chart	84
Dutch Albums Chart	74
French Albums Chart	49
German Albums Chart	39
Spanish Albums Chart	6
UK Albums Chart	71

1990 year-end chart performance for Flowers in the Dirt
Chart (1990)	Peak position
Soviet Albums (Moskovskij Komsomolets)	8

== Certifications and sales ==
Region	Certification	Certified units/sales
Canada (Music Canada)	Gold	50,000^{^}
France (SNEP)	Gold	100,000^{*}
Germany (BVMI)	Gold	250,000^{^}
Italy	—	160,000
Japan (RIAJ)	Gold	86,000^{[B]}
Spain (Promusicae)	2× Platinum	260,000
Sweden (GLF)	Gold	50,000^{^}
Switzerland (IFPI Switzerland)	Gold	25,000^{^}
United Kingdom (BPI)	Platinum	300,000^{^}
United States (RIAA)	Gold	600,000
Summaries
Europe	—	1,000,000
^{*} Sales figures based on certification alone.^{^} Shipments figures based on certification alone.

Notes

- A Aside from standard version, Double-CD deluxe edition subtitled Special Package released in Japan. In 1990, it peaked at No. 27 on the chart and entered there for 4 weeks.
- B Combined sales of standard edition and its expanded reissue.
