= Good Day Sunshine =

- Cover of the Northern Songs sheet music (licensed to Sonora Musikförlag)

Song by the Beatles

from the album Revolver
- Released: 5 August 1966
- Recorded: 8–9 June 1966
- Studio: EMI, London
- Genre: Pop; pop rock; psychedelia; music hall
- Length: 2:09
- Label: Parlophone
- Songwriter: Lennon–McCartney
- Producer: George Martin

"Good Day Sunshine" is a song by the English rock band the Beatles from their 1966 album Revolver. It was written mainly by Paul McCartney and credited to the Lennon–McCartney partnership. McCartney intended it as a song in the style of the Lovin' Spoonful's contemporaneous hit single "Daydream". The recording includes multiple pianos played in the barrelhouse style and evokes a vaudevillian mood.

The composition contains key changes and metric anomalies, and closes with voices chanting the song title. Together with its lyrics celebrating romantic love and sunshine, the recording contrasts with the more austere and experimental aesthetic of Revolver. Among music critics, some writers have welcomed the song's lightheartedness while others view it as a track that dilutes the album's strengths.

"Good Day Sunshine" has been covered by the Tremeloes, Claudine Longet and Robbie Williams. McCartney re-recorded the song for his 1984 film Give My Regards to Broad Street and has regularly performed it in concert. The song was used as the wake-up music on the Space Shuttle mission STS-135. In November 2005, McCartney played it live to the crew of the International Space Station as part of a concert link-up to the space station.

== Background and inspiration ==
Paul McCartney wrote "Good Day Sunshine" at Kenwood, John Lennon's house in Surrey. Drawing inspiration from the sunny day, McCartney composed the melody on Lennon's piano. He later said that Lennon helped write the song, but "it was basically mine." Lennon recalled that the song was McCartney's and that he perhaps "threw in a line or something".

McCartney said that he was influenced by the Lovin' Spoonful's hit single "Daydream" and was trying to write a song in that vein. Lennon and George Harrison had attended the Lovin' Spoonful's concert at the Marquee in London in April 1966; the Beatles and members of the Rolling Stones soon lauded them as the "hot new group". Author Steve Turner writes that the Kinks' "Sunny Afternoon" could have been another source of inspiration for McCartney.

== Composition ==
The song uses the keys of A major and D major. Following a four-bar introduction, it opens with the chorus. Thereafter, the structure comprises three rounds of verse and chorus, in the second of which the verse section contains an instrumental passage; the song ends with a repetition of the chorus, followed by a fadeout coda. Musicologist Alan Pollack likens the musical form to that of a folk ballad with a pop element made explicit through the intro, instrumental passage and coda.

The chords used in the introduction (E throughout) and chorus (B, F♯, E and E^{7}) suggest a key of B major. In musicologist Walter Everett's description, however, the B chord "reveals itself to be the V of V of A" once the verse is heard for the first time. The key change to D major occurs midway through the second verse, for the piano solo.

The six-bar choruses depart from the standard 4/4 time signature by including bars in 3/4 and 5/4 time. Music critic Ian MacDonald describes the chorus as a section that "drop[s] beats left, right, and centre" in contrast to the "barrelhouse 4/4" of the verse. In his analysis of the song, Pollack says that while he had long considered the chorus's metre to vary in this way, the effect is more one of syncopation within 4/4, rather than formal changes in time signature. Within the three two-bar pairings, he continues, this is achieved through rhythmic accents falling on beats 1 and 4 of the first bar and beat 3 of the second bar. (Note: According to Pollack, any "metrical disruption" in McCartney's songs tends to fit the 4/4 framework whereas Lennon's approach is to disregard it entirely.)

Like the Revolver track "She Said She Said", the song closes with an imitative canon in the voices. Author Mark Prendergast likens the ending to that of "I Want to Tell You", saying that where the latter closes with an uplifting Indian devotional quality, "Good Day Sunshine" features a "raga-like edge to its vocal climax". The ending is given extra emphasis through the melody ascending a semitone from the final chorus, to an F^{7} chord.

According to author Mark Hertsgaard, the lyrics combine an appreciation of the sun's life-affirming qualities with a "standard boy–girl love story". In focusing on the latter theme, the song serves as a comparative rarity on Revolver, where the Beatles otherwise avoid the subject of love. As with some of his other songs on the album, this trait set McCartney apart from Lennon and Harrison, whose lyrics increasingly addressed existential concerns. (Note: MacDonald describes Lennon's 1967 song "Good Morning Good Morning" as "in effect, a bilious riposte to McCartney's blithe 'Good Day Sunshine'".)

== Recording ==
The Beatles rehearsed "Good Day Sunshine" extensively in the studio on 8 June 1966, before recording three full takes of the basic track. Take 1 was selected for overdubbing, which they completed the following day. The basic track consisted of piano, bass guitar and drums. MacDonald was unsure if Lennon played guitar. According to Everett, where the Spoonful's "Daydream" includes "a Beatlesque staggering of the entrances of four differently textured guitars", "'Good Day Sunshine' has no guitars at all." In his description of the recording sessions for the song, Beatles historian Mark Lewisohn makes no mention of a guitar track.

Lennon and Harrison added harmony vocals during the choruses, supporting McCartney's lead. On 9 June, the three singers overdubbed further vocals at the end of the track. During the same session, Ringo Starr supplemented his drum part with additional contributions on snare, bass drum and crash cymbals, the latter at the end of the intro and over the choruses, and McCartney played a second piano part. (Note: Author Robert Rodriguez writes that the "crashing breakthrough" of Starr's cymbals undermines any languorous ambience that "Good Day Sunshine" might have borrowed from "Daydream". He comments that the two songs "sounded nothing like each other" and "sonic commonality came from their shared old-timey soft-shoe sensibility".) George Martin contributed the piano solo, played in the barrelhouse style and recorded with the tape speed reduced. Music critic Richie Unterberger writes that Martin's contribution heightens the "old-timey vaudevillian feel" of the song.

Mono and stereo mixes were created, with the only significant difference being the presence of Starr's bass drum during the coda, heard only in the mono version. Automatic double tracking, a technique invented by the EMI engineers at the start of the Revolver sessions, was added to the main vocal track late in the song. For the stereo version, both tracks containing vocals were panned across the stereo image, heightening the effect of multiple voices singing the song title. The final mixes were carried out on 22 June, the day before the band flew to Munich to begin their 1966 world tour. At this point, the song received its formal title, having been documented as "A Good Day's Sunshine" since the first session.

== Release ==
In Britain, EMI gradually distributed Revolver's songs to radio stations throughout July, preparing listeners for the more sophisticated sounds and techniques adopted by the Beatles. EMI's Parlophone label issued the album on 5 August 1966, with "Good Day Sunshine" sequenced as the opening track on side two of the LP. (Note: MacDonald comments that the song thereby forms the first of four consecutive tracks that end in a different key from the key they start in.) Pattie Boyd, Harrison's wife, recalled holidaying on the French Riviera while the Beatles were away on tour, and giving local DJs an acetate of the song to play in the nightclubs she and her fellow model Zouzou visited there.

The album's release took place midway through an unusually hot summer in the UK. It followed Time magazine's recognition of London as the "Swinging City" of international youth culture, a phenomenon in which the Beatles played a principal role, and coincided with an atmosphere of national celebration. According to author Howard Sounes: "The sun seemed to shine every day during the summer of 1966; English music and youth style was applauded; the England soccer team won the World Cup; and the Beatles' Revolver was the soundtrack album of the season."

== Critical reception ==
In their joint review of Revolver for Record Mirror, Peter Jones and Richard Green both praised the song and McCartney's vocal, with Jones adding: "Reminds me somehow, structurally, of some of the Spoonful stuff ... Paul's great. A voice with character, power – but also subtlety. Watch the fade-finish." Writing in Crawdaddy!, Paul Williams commented, "The impact of the Lovin' Spoonful on British groups is excellent evidence of how alive rock 'n' roll is today; everyone learns from everyone else and the music just keeps getting better." Williams admired the lyrics and piano playing on "Good Day Sunshine", saying, "It grows on you like lichen, humble, unspectacular, but very lovable."

"Good Day Sunshine" was one of the few songs that the Kinks' Ray Davies enthused about when invited to give a rundown of Revolver in Disc and Music Echo. Feeling that the album's experimental tone would alienate their fanbase, Davies said of the track: "This'll be a giant. It doesn't force itself on you, but it stands out like 'I'm Only Sleeping'. This is back to the real old Beatles." The song was much admired by American composer and orchestral conductor Leonard Bernstein. When presenting the CBS News documentary Inside Pop: The Rock Revolution in April 1967, Bernstein praised "Good Day Sunshine" for its rhythmic surprises and key changes, citing these as examples of why the Beatles' music was superior to most of their contemporaries' work.

Ian MacDonald considered the track to be the band "at their effortless best" and especially admired McCartney's vocal and Martin's production. He described the song as "both blissfully simple and full of the free-spirited musical jesting with which The Beatles amazed classical critics". In his song review for AllMusic, Richie Unterberger says that it "radiates optimism and good vibes, even by the high standards the Beatles themselves set in those categories". He highlights the group's harmony singing as "some of their most uplifting", particularly over the fadeout, where the vocal effect suggests that "the good vibes ... will not end when the record does, but echo around the skies indefinitely". Mark Hertsgaard cites "Good Day Sunshine" as an example of how "one of the best things about the Beatles' music is it makes you happy", and he deems it "a song whose joy is irresistible". Writing in Barry Miles's The Beatles Diary, Peter Doggett describes the track as "Simple, effective and stunning" and "the ideal complement to the darker Revolver songs".

Less impressed, Bill Wyman of Vulture ranks "Good Day Sunshine" last in his list of the 213 Beatles songs. He views the title as "inane" and the piano playing as a McCartney parody, and concludes: "It's the worst song in the Beatles' classic period. And it ruins Revolver, otherwise the most consistent and mind-blowing collection of pop-rock songs ever conceived by man." Writing for Salon in 2016, Scott Timberg paired it with "Got to Get You into My Life" as examples of the less inspired songs on Revolver. He called them "musically derivative and emotionally forced" and, along with "Yellow Submarine", the three Revolver tracks that provide a welcome lightening of the album's austere mood but "tear its fabric a little bit".

== Cover versions and performances by McCartney ==
That McCartney's songwriting on Revolver retained elements recognisable as both adult-oriented pop and reflective of the new psychedelic aesthetic ensured that his songs were the most widely covered. The Tremeloes recorded "Good Day Sunshine" in 1966 soon after parting company with singer Brian Poole. Released as a single, it failed to become a hit. Beatles biographer Robert Rodriguez views this as surprising, given that McCartney's songs "Here, There and Everywhere", "Good Day Sunshine" and "Got to Get You into My Life" "were all the stuff from which hit singles are made", yet only the last of the three was immediately successful when covered by another artist. (Note: In Doggett's view, it was the composition's various "melodic twists and turns" that "put it beyond the reach of most would-be cover artists".) In 1967, a recording by Claudine Longet peaked at number 100 on the Billboard Hot 100 in the US and number 36 on Billboard's Easy Listening chart.

McCartney re-recorded "Good Day Sunshine" for the soundtrack to his 1984 film Give My Regards to Broad Street. Martin again played the piano solo but although Starr appeared in the film, he refused to contribute to McCartney's new versions of the Beatles' songs. McCartney has also included the song in the set list for his tours, starting with his 1989–90 world tour. A live version from this tour was issued as the B-side of his 1990 single "Birthday".

"Good Day Sunshine" was used as the wake-up music on the Space Shuttle mission STS-135. McCartney played the song live to the crew of the International Space Station on 13 November 2005 in the first concert link-up to the space station.

In 1974, after Harrison withdrew permission for the use of his 1969 song "Here Comes the Sun" in the stage musical John, Paul, George, Ringo ... and Bert, the producers replaced it with "Good Day Sunshine". The song was performed by Barbara Dickson. In 2016 Robbie Williams sang it in the "Good Day Sunshine" episode of Beat Bugs, a children's animated TV series based on the Beatles' songs.

== Personnel ==
According to Jean-Michel Guesdon and Philippe Margotin in their book All the Songs (except where noted). The authors include a question mark beside Lennon's guitar contribution and beside the bass guitar credit, unsure of whether the latter is played by Harrison or McCartney, yet they list Harrison as the player in their description of the band recording the basic track. Mark Lewisohn states that the piano, bass and drums were all taped at the same time.

The Beatles

- Paul McCartney – lead and backing vocals, pianos, handclaps
- John Lennon – harmony and backing vocals, handclaps
- George Harrison – harmony and backing vocals, bass guitar, handclaps
- Ringo Starr – drums, supplementary drums and cymbal, handclaps

Additional musician

- George Martin – piano solo

== Sources ==
- Clayson, Alan (2003). Paul McCartney. London: Sanctuary. ISBN 1-86074-482-6.
- Everett, Walter (1999). The Beatles as Musicians: Revolver Through the Anthology. New York, NY: Oxford University Press. ISBN 978-0-19-512941-0.
- Frontani, Michael R. (2007). The Beatles: Image and the Media. Jackson, MS: University Press of Mississippi. ISBN 978-1-57806-966-8.
- Goldsmith, Melissa Ursula Dawn (2019). Listen to Classic Rock! Exploring a Musical Genre. ABC-CLIO. ISBN 9781440865794.
- Guesdon, Jean-Michel; Margotin, Philippe (2013). All the Songs: The Story Behind Every Beatles Release. New York, NY: Black Dog & Leventhal. ISBN 978-1-57912-952-1.
- Hertsgaard, Mark (1996). A Day in the Life: The Music and Artistry of the Beatles. London: Pan Books. ISBN 0-330-33891-9.
- Lewis, Michael; Spignesi, Stephen J. (2009). 100 Best Beatles Songs A Passionate Fan's Guide. Running Press.
- Lewisohn, Mark (2005) [1988]. The Complete Beatles Recording Sessions: The Official Story of the Abbey Road Years 1962–1970. London: Bounty Books. ISBN 978-0-7537-2545-0.
- MacDonald, Ian (2005). Revolution in the Head: The Beatles' Records and the Sixties (Second Revised ed.). London: Pimlico. ISBN 1-84413-828-3.
- Miles, Barry (2001). The Beatles Diary Volume 1: The Beatles Years. London: Omnibus Press. ISBN 0-7119-8308-9.
- Prendergast, Mark (2003). The Ambient Century: From Mahler to Moby – The Evolution of Sound in the Electronic Age. New York, NY: Bloomsbury. ISBN 1-58234-323-3.
- Rodriguez, Robert (2012). Revolver: How the Beatles Reimagined Rock 'n' Roll. Milwaukee, WI: Backbeat Books. ISBN 978-1-61713-009-0.
- Savage, Jon (2015). 1966: The Year the Decade Exploded. London: Faber & Faber. ISBN 978-0-571-27763-6.
- Schaffner, Nicholas (1978). The Beatles Forever. New York, NY: McGraw-Hill. ISBN 0-07-055087-5.
- Simonelli, David (2013). Working Class Heroes: Rock Music and British Society in the 1960s and 1970s. Lanham, MD: Lexington Books. ISBN 978-0739170519.
- Sounes, Howard (2010). Fab: An Intimate Life of Paul McCartney. London: HarperCollins. ISBN 978-0-00-723705-0.
- Turner, Steve (2016). Beatles '66: The Revolutionary Year. New York, NY: Ecco. ISBN 978-0-06-247558-9.
- Winn, John C. (2009). That Magic Feeling: The Beatles' Recorded Legacy, Volume Two, 1966–1970. New York, NY: Three Rivers Press. ISBN 978-0-307-45239-9.
- Womack, Kenneth (2014). The Beatles Encyclopedia: Everything Fab Four. Santa Barbara, CA: ABC-CLIO. ISBN 978-0-313-39171-2.
