= The Long and Winding Road =

1970 song by the Beatles

- US picture sleeve

Single by the Beatles

from the album Let It Be
- B-side: "For You Blue"
- Released: 11 May 1970
- Recorded: 26 January 1969; 1 April 1970
- Studio: Apple and EMI, London
- Genre: Pop; rock; orchestral soul
- Length: 3:38
- Label: Apple
- Songwriter: Lennon–McCartney
- Producer: Phil Spector

The Beatles US singles chronology
"Let It Be" (1970)	"The Long and Winding Road" (1970)	"Got to Get You into My Life" (1976)

Official audio
- "The Long and Winding Road" on YouTube

"The Long and Winding Road" is a song by the English rock band the Beatles from their 1970 album Let It Be. A piano ballad, it was composed by Paul McCartney in 1968 as the Beatles were growing increasingly bitter towards each other. When writing it, he "imagined it was going to be done by someone like Ray Charles". Principal recording took place in January 1969 during the Get Back album project (later renamed Let It Be) and featured a sparse arrangement of piano, bass, guitar, and percussion. However, the Get Back project soon stagnated and no album resulted, and so John Lennon and George Harrison lent the band's January recordings, including that of "The Long and Winding Road", to producer Phil Spector so that he would try assembling an album out of them. He added lavish orchestral and choral overdubs to the song.

McCartney, along with the rest of the band, sent Spector a telegram sanctioning his arrangements. However, by late April, he had grown to dislike them. The Beatles' producer George Martin and their engineer during the Get Back sessions, Glyn Johns, also disapproved of them. McCartney firmly asked the band's manager Allen Klein to curtail Spector's production, which he did not. When McCartney made his case in the English High Court for the dissolution of the Beatles' legal partnership, he cited the treatment of "The Long and Winding Road" as one of six reasons justifying the split. In his defence, Spector argued that the bass playing on the song, done by Lennon, was poor and had to be covered, and that McCartney had been consulted before its release.

"The Long and Winding Road" was released as part of Let It Be in May 1970, a month after McCartney announced the band's breakup. Critics reacted unfavourably to Let It Be and condemned Spector's overdubs on the song, which reviewer John Mendelsohn called "oppressive mush". Nonetheless, the listening public elevated it to number one on the US Billboard Hot 100 for two weeks in June 1970, the band's second number one of the year and their overall twentieth and final number one hit on that chart. Retrospective reviews have taken more kindly to the song; Ian MacDonald, for instance, thought it was "one of the most beautiful things McCartney ever wrote". Brian Wilson considered it his favourite Beatles song. The original non-overdubbed recording of "The Long and Winding Road" was later released on Anthology 3, and another January 1969 take features on Let It Be... Naked (2003), an album partly born of McCartney's distaste for the song's final version. "The Long and Winding Road" has been covered by Cilla Black, Aretha Franklin, and Ray Charles, among many others.

== Inspiration ==
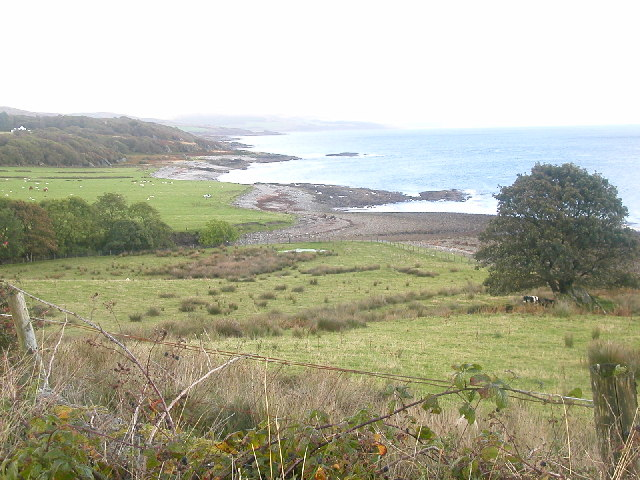
Coastline of the Kintyre peninsula where McCartney composed "The Long and Winding Road" at his High Park farm

Paul McCartney said he came up with the title The Long and Winding Road during an early visit to his property High Park Farm, near Campbeltown, Scotland, which he bought in 1966. The phrase was inspired by the sight of a road "stretching up into the hills" in the remote Highlands surroundings of lochs and distant mountains. (Note: According to Beatles biographer Steve Turner, the road was most likely the B842.) Two years later, he recalls in his Lyrics, this image incarnated as a song. It was inspired by the growing tension among the Beatles. Based on other comments McCartney has made, author Howard Sounes writes, the lyrics can be seen as McCartney expressing his anguish at the direction of his personal life, as well as a nostalgic look back at the Beatles' history.

McCartney recalled: "I just sat down at my piano in Scotland, started playing and came up with that song, imagining it was going to be done by someone like Ray Charles. I have always found inspiration in the calm beauty of Scotland and again it proved the place where I found inspiration." John Lennon said in 1980: "Paul had a little spurt just before we split. I think the shock of Yoko Ono and what was happening gave him a creative spurt including 'Let It Be' and 'The Long and Winding Road,' 'cause that was the last gasp from him." While McCartney penned the song, it is credited to the Lennon–McCartney partnership.

== Composition ==
The secrets of [McCartney's] success are to be found in the manner in which novel approaches to form and harmonic structure underscore the emotional core of the song, and belie whatever curbside surface clichés it has which may initially turn you off.

— Alan W. Pollack

The composition takes the form of a piano-based ballad, with conventional chord changes. McCartney described the chords as "slightly jazzy" and in keeping with Charles's style. The song's home key is E-flat major, but it also uses the relative C minor. The opening theme is repeated throughout. The song lacks a traditional chorus, and the melody and lyrics are ambiguous about the opening stanza's position in the piece. In this way, according to musicologist Alan W. Pollack, it is unclear whether the song has just begun, is in the verse, or is in the bridge. As for the genre, "The Long and Winding Road" has variably been described as a pop, rock, and orchestral soul song.

McCartney told his biographer Barry Miles in the 1990s: "The Long and Winding Road" is "rather a sad song. I like writing sad songs, it's a good bag to get into because you can actually acknowledge some deeper feelings of your own and put them in it. It's a good vehicle, it saves having to go to a psychiatrist." He also commented that the song was "all about the unattainable; the door you never quite reach ... the road that you never get to the end of."

== Recording ==
=== Demo ===
Once back in London, in 1968, McCartney recorded a demo of "The Long and Winding Road" during one of the recording sessions for the White Album. Later, he offered the song to Tom Jones on the condition that the singer release it as his very next single. In Jones's recollection, his record company made the offer impossible since it was about to issue "Without Love" as a single.

=== January 1969 ===
McCartney premiered "The Long and Winding Road" on 7 January 1969 during the Beatles' filmed rehearsals at Twickenham Film Studios. At the time, the band was working on the album Get Back, an attempted return to the group's roots after experimenting with opulent, intricate music. Their greatest influences as young musicians in the 1950s were skiffle, a largely guitar-based genre blending American folk and blues, and, more so, rock and roll such as in the style of Eddie Cochran. McCartney planned, in Beatles historian Chris Ingham's telling, "to learn some songs, record them without frills, play them at a concert and film the whole thing." While the live album and documentary eventually fell out of favour, (Note: But the band did perform live on the rooftop of Apple Studios on 30 January, and a documentary was released the next year donning the title Let It Be.) the idea of a roots album stayed. The Get Back sessions struggled under the air of conflict and weariness within the band, such that after some time, "the only member with any real enthusiasm for the project was Paul". (Note: Still, several accounts show that the group's friendliness and energy lingered on throughout the sessions, and some of their recordings from this time were humorous.) George Martin, their producer, detached himself more and more from the group's affairs, leaving sound engineer Glyn Johns to do his work.

The band recorded several takes of "The Long and Winding Road" at their Apple Studio in central London on 26 January and again on 31 January. The line-up was McCartney on lead vocals and piano, Lennon on six-string bass guitar, George Harrison on electric guitar played with a Leslie speaker effect, Ringo Starr on drums, and guest keyboardist Billy Preston on electric piano. As Lennon only occasionally played bass, he made several mistakes on the recording, Beatles scholar Ian MacDonald finds.

As seen in Peter Jackson's documentary Get Back, following the 26 January recording session, the band discussed the possibility of adding an orchestral accompaniment to the song. "The only way I've ever heard it in my head," McCartney said, "is like Ray Charles's band... We were planning to do it anyway for a couple of numbers, just to have a bit of brass and a bit of strings." Harrison supported the idea of a brass accompaniment: "It would be nice with some brass just doing the sustaining chord thing, moving and just holding notes."

In May 1969, Glyn Johns, who had been asked by the Beatles to compile and mix an album from the sessions, selected the 26 January recording. The 31 January take, which had slightly different lyrics and was recorded with Johns in an unofficial producer's role, was used in the film, subsequently titled Let It Be. But the tapes handed to Johns were of poor quality—in Lennon's words, "the shittiest load of badly recorded shit"—and the band refused Johns's two takes at a Get Back album.

=== April 1970 ===
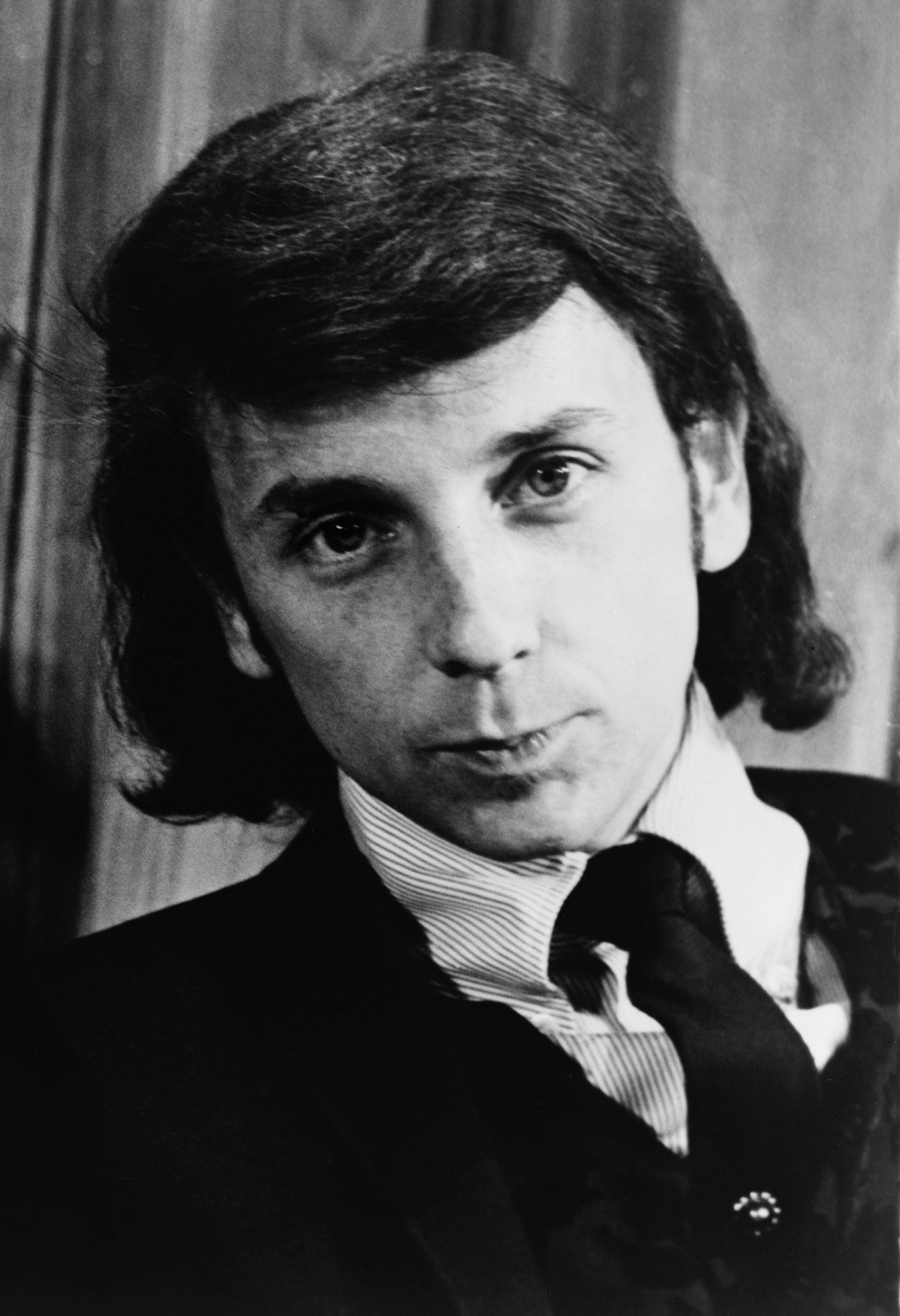
Producer Phil Spector added orchestral overdubs to the recording of "The Long and Winding Road" which featured on the Let It Be album.

In January 1970, Lennon and Harrison turned over the January 1969 recordings to American producer Phil Spector, in the hope of salvaging an album fit for release. Spector had already produced the Plastic Ono Band single "Instant Karma!" to Lennon's liking. At this point, the Get Back project as originally imagined had been abandoned; it would be renamed to Let It Be. McCartney had become estranged from his bandmates due to his opposition to Klein's appointment as manager. Several weeks were lost before McCartney replied to messages requesting his approval for Spector to begin working on the recordings. Spector chose to return to the same 26 January recording of "The Long and Winding Road".

Spector made various changes to the songs. His most dramatic embellishments occurred on 1 April 1970, the last ever Beatles recording session, when he added orchestral overdubs to "The Long and Winding Road", "Across the Universe", and "I Me Mine" at EMI Studios. The only member of the Beatles present was Starr, who played drums with the session musicians to create Spector's characteristic Wall of Sound. Already known for his eccentric behaviour in the studio, Spector was in a peculiar mood that day, according to balance engineer Peter Bown: "He wanted tape echo on everything, he had to take a different pill every half-hour and had his bodyguard with him constantly. He was on the point of throwing a wobbly, saying 'I want to hear this, I want to hear that. I must have this, I must have that.'" The orchestra became so annoyed by Spector's behaviour that the musicians refused to play any further; at one point, Bown left for home, forcing Spector to telephone him and persuade him to return after Starr had told Spector to calm down.

Spector nonetheless succeeded in overdubbing "The Long and Winding Road", using eighteen violins, four violas, four cellos, three trumpets, three trombones, two guitars, and a choir of fourteen women. The orchestra was scored and conducted by Richard Hewson, a young London arranger who had worked with Apple Corps artists Mary Hopkin and James Taylor. According to technical engineer Brian Gibson, Spector removed one of McCartney's vocal tracks on the original recording to accommodate his arrangements. Additionally, writers Jean-Michel Guesdon and Philippe Margotin comment that Harrison's guitar and Preston's piano parts "disappeared" as Spector produced the final mix. This lush orchestral treatment directly contradicted the Beatles' stated intentions for a "real" recording when they began work on Get Back. However, Apple executive Neil Aspinall would later recall: "I'm not sure that anyone said, 'It's got to be what a four or five piece band could do, Phil; no overdubbing and orchestras ... They just gave the tapes to him and he did what Phil Spector does."

On 2 April, Spector sent each of the Beatles an acetate of the completed album with a note saying: "If there is anything you'd like done to the album, let me know and I'll be glad to help ... If you wish, please call me about anything regarding the album tonight", along with a lengthy letter justifying his changes. All four Beatles, including McCartney, sent Spector a telegram giving their approval.

== Dispute over Spector's overdubs ==
McCartney sent Allen Klein a letter in April 1970 concerning Phil Spector's production on "The Long and Winding Road".

According to author Peter Doggett, McCartney had felt the need to accommodate his bandmates when accepting Spector's version of Let It Be. However, following his announcement of the Beatles' breakup in a press release accompanying the release of his debut solo album, McCartney, on 9 April, he became dissatisfied with Spector's additions, particularly on "The Long and Winding Road". He had hoped for a simple production and a documentary aesthetic. On 14 April, with manufacturing underway for Let It Be, he sent a terse letter to Klein, demanding that the harp be removed from the song and that the other added instrumentation and voices be reduced. McCartney concluded the letter with the words: "Don't ever do it again." Klein tried to phone McCartney but he had changed his number without informing Apple; Klein then sent a telegram asking McCartney to contact him or Spector about his concerns. According to Klein, "The following day, a message was relayed to me [from McCartney] that the letter spoke for itself." With Let It Be scheduled for release in advance of the film, Klein allowed the production process to continue with Spector's version of "The Long and Winding Road" intact.

In an interview published by the Evening Standard in two parts on 21 and 22 April 1970, McCartney said:

The album was finished a year ago, but a few months ago American record producer Phil Spector was called in by John Lennon to tidy up some of the tracks. But a few weeks ago, I was sent a re-mixed version of my song "The Long and Winding Road" with harps, horns, an orchestra and women's choir added. No one had asked me what I thought. I couldn't believe it. I would never have female voices on a Beatles record.

The band's usual producer, George Martin, called the remixes "so uncharacteristic" of the Beatles. Johns, whom Lennon denied a production credit, later described Spector's embellishments as "revolting ... just puke", while Derek Taylor, the group's press officer, "took the view that nobody should have ever interfered with their music". On the other hand, Harrison liked Spector's arrangements on the song as well as on Let It Be. Journalist Bill Harry suggests that Lennon too did not mind them, as Spector worked on his solo album, John Lennon/Plastic Ono Band; he also worked on Harrison's All Things Must Pass.

Around this time, McCartney asked Klein to dissolve the Beatles' partnership, but was refused. He took the case to the High Court in London in early 1971, naming Klein and the other Beatles as defendants. Among the six reasons McCartney gave for dissolving the Beatles was that Klein's company, ABKCO, had imposed changes to "The Long and Winding Road" without consulting McCartney. In his written affidavit, Starr countered this statement by saying that when Spector had sent acetates of Let It Be to each of the Beatles for their approval, with a request also for feedback: "We all said yes. Even at the beginning Paul said yes. I spoke to him on the phone, and said, 'Did you like it?' and he said, 'Yeah, it's OK.' He didn't put it down." Starr added: "And then suddenly he didn't want it to go out. Two weeks after that, he wanted to cancel it." Author Nicholas Schaffner commented that, in light of McCartney's contention in the High Court, it was surprising that he personally accepted the band's Grammy Award for Let It Be in March 1971 and that he chose to feature his wife Linda's voice so prominently on his post-Beatles recordings.

Soon after the overdubbing sessions, Spector said he had asked the Beatles whether they wanted to help him produce the album, and none of them did. He later disclosed, as reported in the 2009 documentary The Agony and the Ecstasy of Phil Spector, that he was forced into orchestrating "The Long and Winding Road" to cover the poor quality of Lennon's bass playing; Spector also denied that McCartney was not consulted, saying that he had first contacted McCartney about the choice of musical arranger. In his book Revolution in the Head, MacDonald writes: "In particular, it features some atrocious bass-playing by Lennon, prodding clumsily around as if uncertain of the harmonies and making many comical mistakes. ... Lennon's crude bass playing on 'The Long and Winding Road', though largely accidental, amounts to sabotage when presented as finished work." (Note: According to Guesdon and Margotin, instead of inserting orchestral overdubs, Spector could have lowered the bass part in the recording to dilute it.) In 2003, Spector called McCartney's criticism "hypocritical", alleging that "Paul had no problem picking up the Academy Award [Grammy Award] for the Let It Be movie soundtrack, (Note: McCartney accepted the Grammy in Los Angeles in March 1971, but when a month later, the film won the Academy Award for Best Original Song Score, none of the Beatles were in attendance. Producer and composer Quincy Jones collected the reward on their behalf.) nor did he have any problem in using my arrangement of the string and horn and choir parts when he performed it during 25 years of touring on his own. If Paul wants to get into a pissing contest about it, he's got me mixed up with someone who gives a shit."

== Release ==
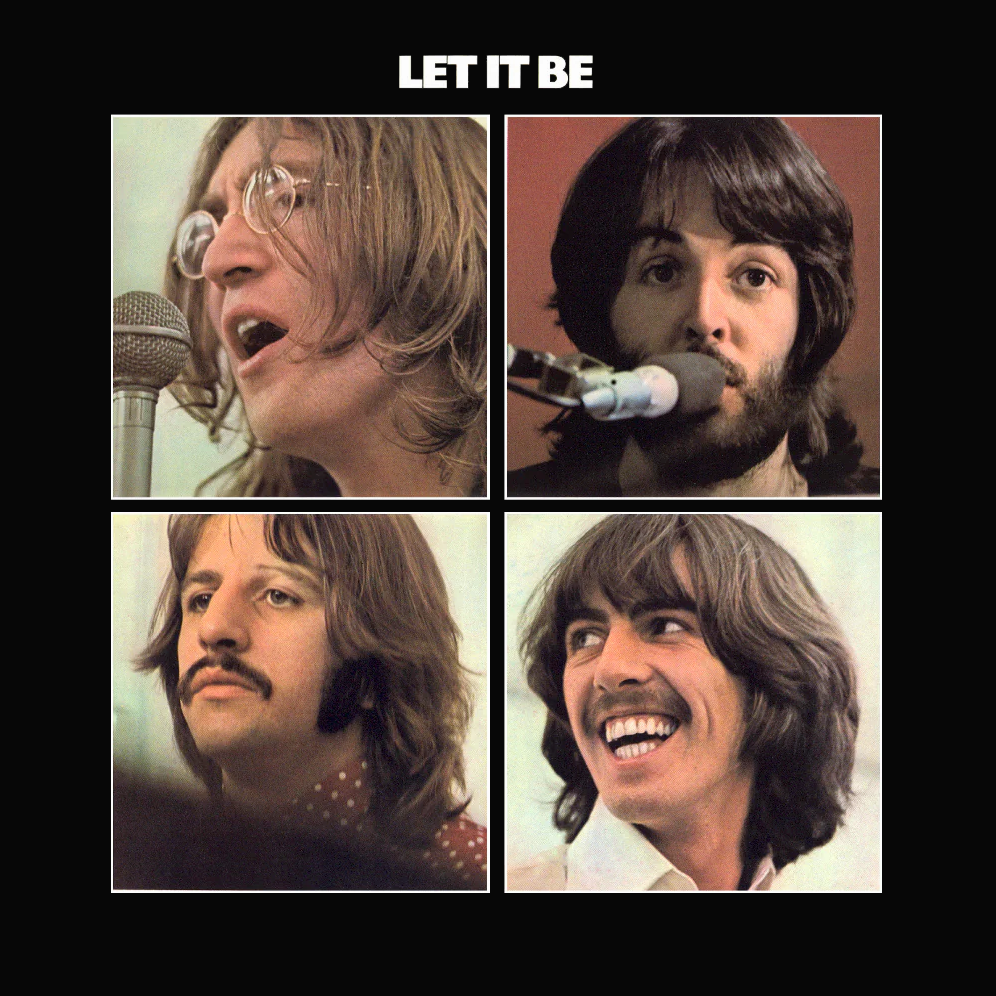
"The Long and Winding Road" was released on Let It Be (1970).

The song was released on the Let It Be album on 8 May 1970. McCartney had announced the Beatles' disbanding one month prior. On 11 May, only one week before the album's North American release, Apple issued "The Long and Winding Road" as a single in the United States with "For You Blue" on the B-side. It was their last single released in the US while the band was still active. The single was released in several European countries but not the United Kingdom. In the context of the recent news regarding the Beatles' split, the song captured the sadness that many listeners felt.

In the US, "For You Blue" gained sufficient radio airplay for Billboard to chart the two songs together, as a double-sided hit. The record was similarly listed as a double A-side when it topped Canada's singles chart. On 13 June 1970, it became the Beatles' twentieth and final number-one single on the Billboard Hot 100 chart, holding the top position for a second week. The band thereby set the all-time record for number of chart-topping singles on the Billboard Hot 100. The Beatles achieved this feat in a period of less than six and a half years, starting with "I Want to Hold Your Hand" on 1 February 1964, during which they topped the Hot 100 in one out of every six weeks. "The Long and Winding Road" also topped the US charts compiled by Cash Box and Record World, giving the band their 22nd and 23rd number-one hits on those charts.

The single had a relatively brief run on the Billboard Hot 100, and its contemporary US sales were insufficient for gold accreditation by the Recording Industry Association of America (RIAA). In February 1999, the RIAA certified it platinum for amassing a million sales.

== Critical reception ==
Let It Be largely received unfavourable reviews from music critics, many of whom ridiculed Spector's use of orchestration, particularly on "The Long and Winding Road". In his album review for Melody Maker, Richard Williams wrote that "Paul's songs seem to be getting looser and less concise, and Spector's orchestrations add to the Bacharach atmosphere. The strings add a pleasant fullness in places, but intrude badly near the end and the harps are too much." Rolling Stone's reviewer, John Mendelsohn, was especially critical of Spector's work, saying: "He's rendered 'The Long and Winding Road' ... virtually unlistenable with hideously cloying strings and a ridiculous choir that serve only to accentuate the listlessness of Paul's vocal and the song's potential for further mutilation at the hands of the countless schlock-mongers who will undoubtedly trip all over one another in their haste to cover it." Mendelsohn said that while the song was a "slightly lesser chapter in the ongoing story of McCartney as facile romanticist", "it might have eventually begun to grow on one as unassumingly charming" without Spector's "oppressive mush". Robert Christgau gave Let It Be a good review but made a sole exception for McCartney's song: "The [album's] one mistake is 'The Long and Winding Road,' sunk in a slush of strings worthy of its shapeless philosophizing. But even the great are allowed to falter now and then."

In 1973, musicologist and critic Wilfrid Mellers wrote: "The music has a tremendous expectancy ... Whether or not Paul approved of the plush scoring of 'The Long and Winding Road', it works not because it guys the feeling but because the feeling has integrity." MacDonald said: "With its heart-breaking suspensions and yearning backward glances from the sad wisdom of the major key to the lost loves and illusions of the minor, 'The Long and Winding Road' is one of the most beautiful things McCartney ever wrote. Its words, too, are among his most poignant, particularly the reproachful lines of the brief four-bar middle section. A shame Lennon didn't listen more generously." Guesdon and Margotin, focusing on Spector's production, noted: "The result was clearly not in the best taste", arguing that his Wall of Sound ran counter to the Beatles' musical style.

According to Williams, writing in his book Phil Spector: Out of His Head, Spector's mistake was in "taking McCartney at his face value" and emphasising the sentimental qualities that George Martin's orchestral arrangements for the Beatles had successfully tempered. Williams added: "Some might say that this track, above all others, epitomises Paul McCartney, and that when Spector sent the saccharine strings sweeping in after the first line of vocal, he was merely highlighting the reality." In a 2003 review for Mojo, shortly after the announcement that McCartney planned to issue "a string-less Let It Be", John Harris opined: "As someone who experiences a Proustian rush every time the orchestra crash-lands in 'The Long and Winding Road', I can only implore him to think again. Besides, underneath all the Wagnerian gloop, John's bass playing is horribly out of tune ..." Referring to the version subsequently released without the controversial overdubs, Adam Sweeting of The Guardian said the song was "indubitably improved by the removal of Spector's wall of schmaltz" but "still teeth-clenchingly mawkish." In 2011, Rolling Stone placed "The Long and Winding Road" at number 90 on its list of "The 100 Greatest Beatles Songs". On a similar list compiled by Mojo in 2006, the song appeared at number 27. In his commentary for the magazine, Brian Wilson called it his very favourite Beatles song, saying that while the Beatles were "genius songwriters", "The Long and Winding Road" was distinguished by a "heart-and-soul melody". Wilson concluded: "When they broke up I was heartbroken. I think they should have kept going."

== Other Beatles and McCartney versions ==
McCartney has released six additional recordings since the song's original release in 1970. He had resisted playing Beatles songs with his band Wings, but played fragments of "The Long and Winding Road" and others during One Hand Clapping. He included it in the set list for Wings' 1975–76 world tour, which produced the live version on the 1976 album Wings over America.

McCartney re-recorded "The Long and Winding Road" for the soundtrack to his 1984 film Give My Regards to Broad Street. George Martin produced the track, which includes saxophone accompaniment and what authors Chip Madinger and Mark Easter describe as a Las Vegas-style musical arrangement. (Note: Madinger and Easter comment that the 1984 version fails to support how "near and dear to his heart" the song was and McCartney's complaint that Spector had "overproduced" the Beatles' recording. Beatles biographer Kenneth Womack views it as an "outrageous jazz reading" and the "ridiculous nadir" of McCartney's attempts to revisit the song.) A second new studio recording of the song was made by McCartney in 1989 and used as a B-side of single releases from his Flowers in the Dirt album, starting with the "Postcard Pack" vinyl format of "This One". On McCartney's 1989–90 world tour in support of Flowers in the Dirt, the song was performed with a musical backing that, in Kenneth Womack's view, "clearly attempts to replicate" the strings added by Spector in 1970. The version released on the live album from the tour, Tripping the Live Fantastic, and also as a single was the only song taken from McCartney's two April 1990 shows at the Maracanã Stadium in Rio de Janeiro. (Note: With his 21 April concert there, McCartney broke the attendance record held by Frank Sinatra by performing to a crowd estimated at around 184,000. The Guinness Book of Records recognised it as "the largest paying audience ever to see a rock concert by a single artist".)

The 1996 Beatles' outtakes compilation Anthology 3 includes the original 26 January 1969 take, without Spector's overdubs. "The Long and Winding Road" provided the working title for Neil Aspinall's early version of the documentary film that became the 1995 TV series The Beatles Anthology. The title was changed in the 1990s after Harrison objected to the project being named after McCartney's song.

By 2003, McCartney had obtained permission from Harrison, who died in 2001, Starr, and Yoko Ono to release Let It Be... Naked, a remix conceived by him. It attempted to create what the band had first wanted with Let It Be but also to produce a modern, cleaner sounding version; one of its many changes was erasing Spector's garnishes and some overdubs. McCartney said that his long-standing dissatisfaction with the released version of "The Long and Winding Road" was partly the impetus for the new version. The album included a take of the song from 31 January 1969. With no added strings and diluted instrumentation, it approached the Beatles' original intention better than the 1970 version. Journalist David Crossley argued that of all the album's tracks, "The Long and Winding Road" "underwent the most profound transformation". This take is also heard in the film Let It Be and on the Beatles' 2015 video compilation 1. Starr said of the Let It Be... Naked version: "There's nothing wrong with Phil's strings [on the 1970 release]; this is just a different attitude to listening. But it's been 30-odd years since I've heard it without all that and it just blew me away."

"The Long and Winding Road" remains a staple of McCartney's concert repertoire as a solo artist. He performed it at the end of his set at the 2005 Live 8 concert in London. On his 2009 tours, McCartney played it as part of a nostalgia-filled set that included tributes to Linda McCartney, Lennon, and Harrison. While performing "The Long and Winding Road", a screen displayed Linda's photos of the family's Arizona ranch, including the horse trail she and McCartney rode shortly before her death.

== Cover versions ==
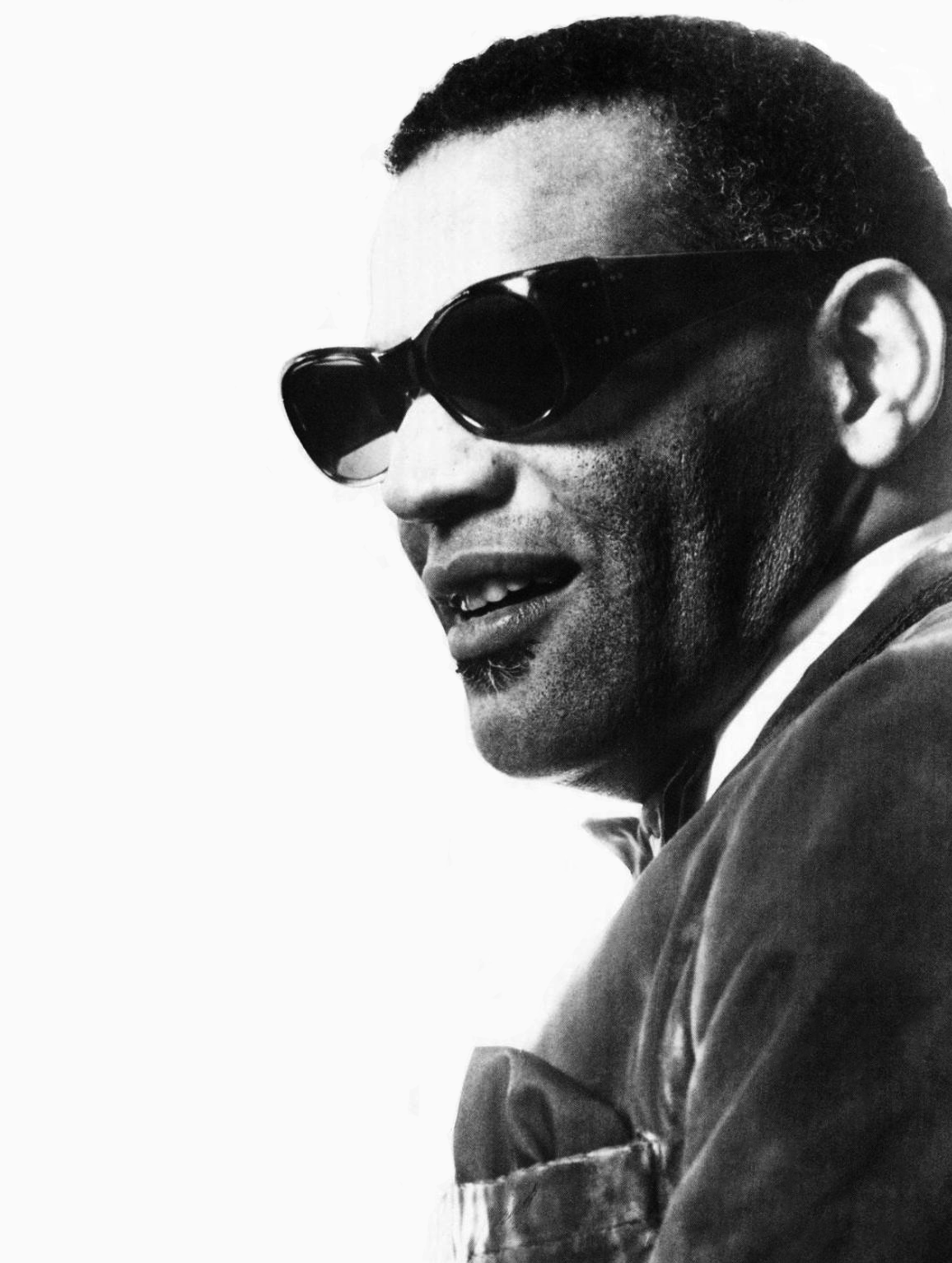
Among the many artists who covered "The Long and Winding Road" was Ray Charles. McCartney modelled the song after his musical style.

"The Long and Winding Road" was one of several McCartney compositions from the Beatles era that became widely covered by easy listening artists and persuaded adults that the younger generation's musical tastes had merit. Ultimate Classic Rock estimates it had been covered 367 times by 2024, making it one of the most recorded Beatles songs.

As McCartney had first envisaged, Ray Charles released a cover on the 1971 album Volcanic Action of My Soul. GQ's David Levesley includes it in his list of Charles's fifteen songs that show the singer's talent; he labels it "mournful and gospel-infused ... So sad, so broken, so hopeful all at once". A later version includes contributions from the Count Basie Orchestra. Aretha Franklin released a recording of "The Long and Winding Road" on her 1972 album Young, Gifted and Black, a version that Rolling Stone writer Rob Sheffield crowns "the greatest of all Beatle covers". And Cilla Black, a Liverpudlian whose first single was written for her by Lennon and McCartney, released a version in 1973; McCartney described this recording as the definitive version of the song. (Note: In August 2015, the Beatles' recording of "The Long and Winding Road" was played at Black's funeral as the coffin left the church.)

Other notable versions include a 2010 performance at the White House by Faith Hill when Barack Obama gave McCartney the Gershwin Prize. Journalist Kal Palmer references Billy Ocean's 1985 cover when depicting a general mood of Ocean's "sad" songs—that they "talk of sadness but attempt to move you away from it". In 2002, British Pop Idol series one contestants Will Young and Gareth Gates recorded a version released as a double A-side with Gates' solo cover of "Suspicious Minds"; the single topped the UK Singles Chart and the Scottish Singles Chart. Music writer Rob Copsey finds a close likeness between their cover and the style of English pop duo Robson & Jerome. In a 2026 interview, McCartney disclosed that Prince had performed "The Long and Winding Road" during a rehearsal. While still to be released, McCartney said he has heard it, noting its "rocky" sound and Prince's guitar work, and hoped to "make it into something really good".

== Personnel ==
According to Walter Everett, except where noted:

The Beatles

- Paul McCartney – vocal, piano
- John Lennon – six-string bass
- George Harrison – electric guitar
- Ringo Starr – drums

Additional musicians

- Billy Preston – electric piano
- Uncredited orchestral musicians – eighteen violins, four violas, four cellos, harp, three trumpets, three trombones, two guitars, fourteen female voices
- Richard Hewson – orchestral arrangement
- John Barham – choral arrangement

== Charts ==
=== Weekly charts ===
1970 weekly chart performance
Chart (1970)	Peak position
Australia (Go-Set National Top 60)	6
Australia (Kent Music Report)	7
Belgium (Ultratop Flanders)	8
Belgium (Ultratop 50 Wallonia)	15
Canada Singles Chart (RPM)	1
Italy (Musica e dischi)	5
Netherlands (Single Top 100)	11
New Zealand (Listener)	3
Sweden (Tio i Topp)	7
Switzerland (Swiss Hitparade)	8
US Billboard Hot 100	1
US Billboard Easy Listening	2
US Cash Box Top 100	1
West German Musikmarkt Singles	26

1990–91 weekly chart performance for the 1990 Paul McCartney recording
Chart (1990–91)	Rank
Italy (Musica e dischi)	6

=== Year-end charts ===
1970 year-end chart performance
Chart (1970)	Rank
Canada RPM Top Singles	11
US Billboard Year-End	41
US Cash Box Year-End	36

1991 year-end chart performance for the 1990 Paul McCartney recording
Chart (1991)	Rank
Italy (Musica e dischi)	93

== Certifications ==
Certifications for "The Long and Winding Road"
Region	Certification	Certified units/sales
New Zealand (RMNZ)	Gold	15,000^{‡}
United Kingdom (BPI)	Silver	200,000^{‡}
United States (RIAA)	Platinum	1,000,000^{^}
^{^} Shipments figures based on certification alone.^{‡} Sales+streaming figures based on certification alone.
