= Alan W. Pollack =

American musicologist

- Born: United States
- Occupations: Musicologist, professor
- Years active: 1989–present

Alan W. Pollack is an American musicologist best known for having analyzed most songs released by the British band the Beatles. He started the task in 1989 and finished in 2000, with 187 original songs and 25 cover songs. The analyses have come to be known as the "Notes on ..." series, as each is entitled "Notes on 'Love Me Do'", "Notes on 'Help!'" etc. The notes were released weekly on the rec.music.beatles usenet group.

== Academic career ==
Pollack holds a B.A. in music from Brooklyn College and both an M.A. and PhD from the University of Pennsylvania in music theory and composition. He was an instructor of music theory and composition at Yale University from 1975 to 1977. From 1978 through 2013 he pursued a career in software engineering. Since 2014 he has been working as a freelance classical pianist and musical commentator.

== The Beatles ==
Gary Burns, editor of the journal Popular Music and Society, groups Pollack with authors and academics such as Wilfrid Mellers, Terence J. O'Grady and Walter Everett who have each advanced the field of musicological study into the Beatles' work.

Pollack's song analyses and comments on unifying themes were later incorporated by Everett in his two-volume study The Beatles as Musicians (1999; 2001). The "Notes on …" series is also among the "Recommended Resources" in author and critic Kenneth Womack's 2014 book The Beatles Encyclopedia.
