= Put It There =

Single by Paul McCartney

from the album Flowers in the Dirt
- B-side: "Mama's Little Girl"; "Same Time Next Year" (12" and CD single only); (Paul McCartney & Wings)
- Released: 5 February 1990
- Recorded: 22 April 1988; 28 November 1988
- Studio: Hog Hill Mill (Icklesham, UK); AIR (London, UK)
- Genre: Rock
- Length: 2:09
- Label: Parlophone
- Songwriter: Paul McCartney
- Producer: Paul McCartney

Paul McCartney singles chronology
"Figure of Eight" (1990)	"Put It There" (1990)	"Birthday" (1990)

"Put It There" is a 1990 single from Paul McCartney's 1989 album, Flowers in the Dirt. The song reached number 32 on the UK singles chart. The lyrics were inspired by an expression of friendship and solace that McCartney learned from his father, "Put it there if it weighs a ton".

== Overview ==
Despite achieving modest chart success, the song, like all the other tracks from Flowers in the Dirt, has not yet been included on any Paul McCartney compilation album to date.

The 7" single also included "Mama's Little Girl", a Wings song that had been originally recorded in 1972 but had been remixed and produced in its current version in 1987 by McCartney, co-producer Chris Thomas and engineer Bill Price.

The 12" single included "Same Time Next Year", a second Wings song which had been recorded on 5 and 6 May 1978 at RAK Studios, as a possible theme for the film Same Time, Next Year.

The 12" single was also released as limited edition (12 RS6246) with an art print from the cover illustration. The cover illustration was drawn by McCartney.

According to the liner notes from Geoff Baker, the song was issued as single because of the Parisian crowd from the concerts at the Palais Omnisports in October 1989, as the girls were grabbing partners and bobbing to "Put It There".

"Put It There" is also the name of an hour-long documentary on the making of Flowers in the Dirt, produced by Chips Chipperfield and directed by Geoff Wonfor (who later made The Beatles Anthology), originally released in September 1989 and later included on the 2017 remastered version of the album.

== Track listing ==
All songs written by Paul McCartney, except "Mama's Little Girl" by Paul and Linda McCartney.

=== 7" and cassette single ===
1. "Put It There" – 2:08
2. "Mama's Little Girl" – 3:40

=== 12" single ===
Side one

1. "Put It There" – 2:08
2. "Mama's Little Girl" – 3:40

Side two

1. "Same Time Next Year" – 3:07

=== CD single ===
1. "Put It There" – 2:08
2. "Mama's Little Girl" – 3:40
3. "Same Time Next Year" – 3:07

== Personnel ==
Personnel are taken from the Flowers in the Dirt Archive Collection LP liner notes

- Paul McCartney – lead vocals, backing vocals, percussion, acoustic guitar, orchestration
- Chris Whitten – hi-hat, percussion
- Hamish Stuart – bass, percussion
- George Martin – orchestration

== Charts ==
Chart (1990)	Peak position
Canada Top Singles (RPM)	28
Germany (GfK)	60
Ireland	17
Netherlands (Single Top 100)	82
UK Singles (Official Charts)	32
US Adult Contemporary (Billboard)	11
