= The New World Tour =

1993 concert tour by Paul McCartney

- World tour by Paul McCartney
- Location: Europe • North America • South America • Oceania
- Associated album: Off the Ground
- Start date: 18 February 1993
- End date: 16 December 1993
- Legs: 7
- No. of shows: 77

Paul McCartney concert chronology
- Unplugged Tour 1991 (1991); The New World Tour (1993); Driving World Tour (2002)

In 1993, Paul McCartney and his band embarked upon The New World Tour, spanning almost the entire year and almost the entire globe. This tour featured a controversial pre-concert film (starting in the U.S leg of the tour), which was shown before all of the concerts and had graphic animal test footage in the film. The tour incorporated painted stage sets (at the time the world's largest, measuring 16,400 square feet), projections, and promotional material designed by a regular McCartney collaborator, the artist Brian Clarke.

The 1993 World Tour was Paul's last tour for nine years, after his wife and band member Linda McCartney was diagnosed with breast cancer in 1995, as well as Linda's last tour during her lifetime, before she died in 1998 at the age of 56.

== Promotion ==
The tour was intended to promote McCartney's ninth studio album Off the Ground. Despite having released three albums of live material in the space of the previous three years (Tripping the Live Fantastic, Tripping the Live Fantastic: Highlights!, and Unplugged), the tour was followed by the live album Paul Is Live, consisting of material taken from The New World Tour. However, the release was not embraced by record-buyers, becoming McCartney's lowest-selling live album.

== Touring ==
McCartney's touring band consisted of himself, wife Linda McCartney, Hamish Stuart, Robbie McIntosh, Paul "Wix" Wickens and Blair Cunningham. The final North American stop, in Charlotte, North Carolina, was broadcast live across the United States, with some songs replaced by commercials, by the Fox Television Network. This was McCartney's final tour of the 20th century. Several venues on the tour featured McCartney's first concert appearance there since his touring days with The Beatles.

This was the third and second times Paul McCartney toured Australia and New Zealand, respectively. A proposed further tour to Australia in 2002 was cancelled after the Bali Bombings. His next visit to Australia and New Zealand finally occurred for the first time in over twenty-four years on the One on One tour in 2017. In 1993, before Paul McCartney played the South American leg of the tour, Parlophone/MPL released the album Paul Is Live which had songs taken from his concerts in North America and Australia. In 2002, Paul McCartney released a concert DVD from the tour titled Paul Is Live in Concert on the New World Tour.

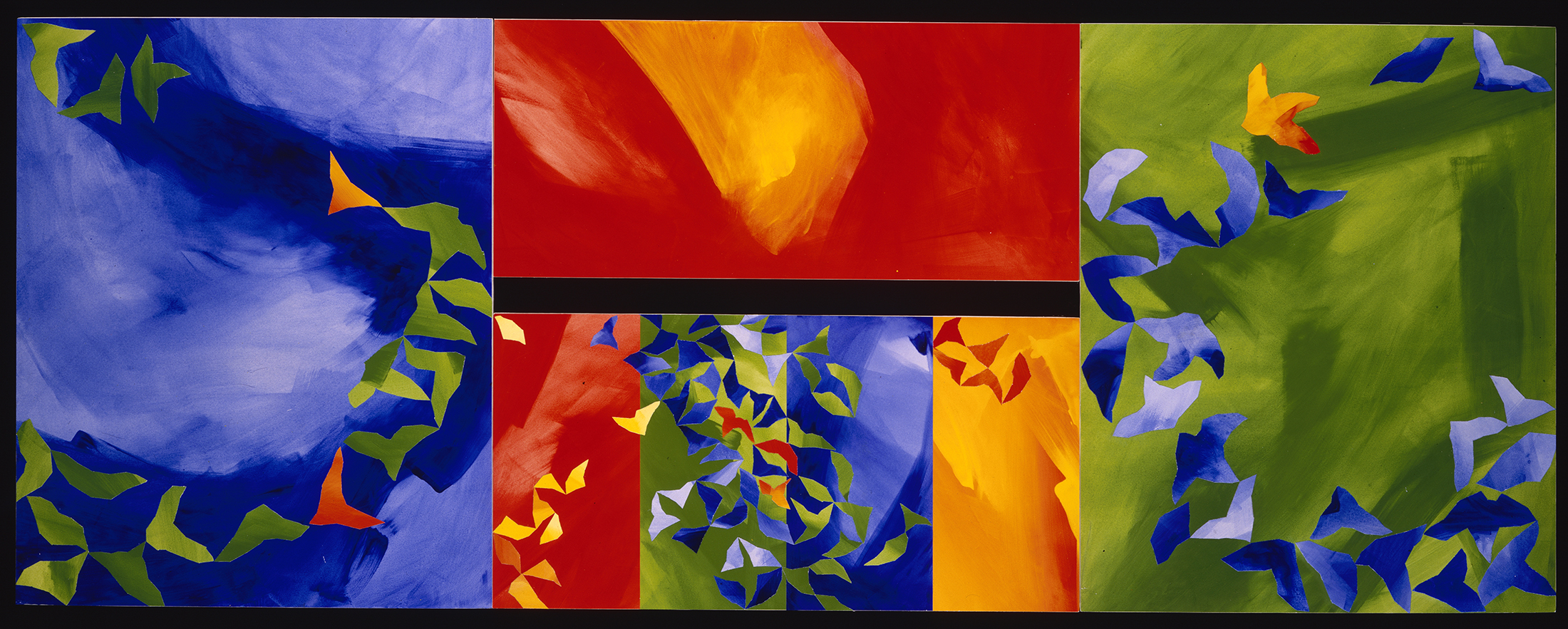
The designs for the New World Tour stage sets by Brian Clarke, executed as oil on rolled canvas and at the time the largest stage sets in history.

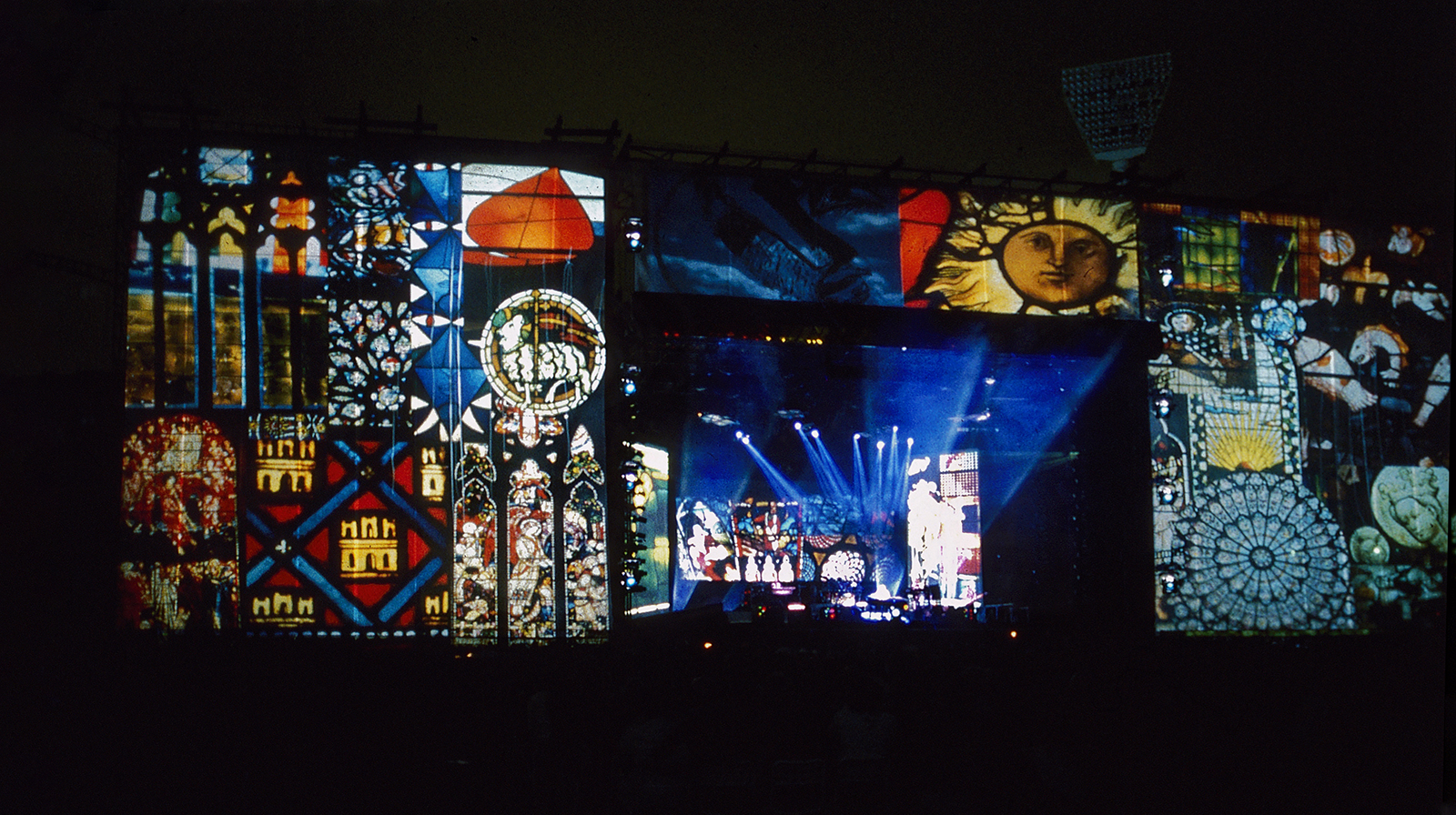
Projections designed by Clarke as part of the New World Tour stage sets, a collage of the history of stained glass, which were projected during the song 'Let It Be'.

== Personnel ==
- Paul McCartney – lead vocals, guitars (acoustic, electric and bass), piano, drums
- Linda McCartney – backing vocals, keyboards, percussion, autoharp
- Hamish Stuart – backing vocals, guitars (acoustic, electric, acoustic bass and electric bass)
- Robbie McIntosh – backing vocals, guitars (electric and acoustic)
- Paul "Wix" Wickens – backing vocals, keyboards, accordion, acoustic guitar, percussion
- Blair Cunningham – drums, percussion

== Tour dates ==
List of 1993 concerts
Date	City	Country	Venue	Tickets sold / Available	Revenue
18 February	Milan	Italy	Forum di Assago	—N/a	—N/a
19 February	Milan	Italy	Forum di Assago	—N/a	—N/a
22 February	Frankfurt	Germany	Festhalle	—N/a	—N/a
23 February	Frankfurt	Germany	Festhalle	—N/a	—N/a
5 March	Perth	Australia	Subiaco Oval	—N/a	—N/a
9 March	Melbourne	Australia	Melbourne Cricket Ground	—N/a	—N/a
10 March	Melbourne	Australia	Melbourne Cricket Ground	—N/a	—N/a
13 March	Adelaide	Australia	Adelaide Oval	—N/a	—N/a
16 March	Sydney	Australia	Sydney Entertainment Centre	27,880 / 30,000	$1,150,443
17 March	Sydney	Australia	Sydney Entertainment Centre	27,880 / 30,000	$1,150,443
20 March	Sydney	Australia	Sydney Entertainment Centre	27,880 / 30,000	$1,150,443
22 March	Sydney	Australia	Parramatta Stadium	—N/a	—N/a
23 March	Sydney	Australia	Parramatta Stadium	—N/a	—N/a
27 March	Auckland	New Zealand	Western Springs Stadium	—N/a	—N/a
14 April	Las Vegas	United States	Sam Boyd Silver Bowl	30,850 / 30,850	$1,002,625
17 April	Anaheim	United States	Anaheim Stadium	48,560 / 48,560	$1,698,410
20 April	Las Cruces	United States	Aggie Memorial Stadium	30,058 / 30,058	$1,002,625
22 April	Houston	United States	Astrodome	38,728 / 38,728	$1,258,660
24 April	New Orleans	United States	Louisiana Superdome	38,971 / 41,211	$843,850
27 April	Memphis	United States	Liberty Bowl Memorial Stadium	42,003 / 42,003	$1,013,364
29 April	St. Louis	United States	Busch Stadium	43,866 / 43,866	$1,202,468
1 May	Atlanta	United States	Georgia Dome	46,352 / 46,352	$1,301,820
5 May	Cincinnati	United States	Riverfront Stadium	38,000 / 40,000	$1,156,513
7 May	Columbia	United States	Williams-Brice Stadium	37,646 / 39,662	$858,089
9 May	Orlando	United States	Citrus Bowl	42,614 / 42,614	$1,163,061
21 May	Winnipeg	Canada	Winnipeg Stadium	37,430 / 45,095	$1,038,964
23 May	Minneapolis	United States	Hubert H. Humphrey Metrodome	40,287 / 40,287	$1,187,680
26 May	Boulder	United States	Folsom Field	37,245 / 39,137	$1,210,463
29 May	San Antonio	United States	Alamodome	46,716 / 46,716	$1,513,200
31 May	Kansas City	United States	Arrowhead Stadium	42,934 / 42,934	$1,132,576
2 June	Milwaukee	United States	Milwaukee County Stadium	47,013 / 47,013	$1,527,923
4 June	Pontiac	United States	Pontiac Silverdome	49,378 / 49,378	$1,291,778
6 June	Toronto	Canada	CNE Stadium	32,442 / 40,000	$922,200
11 June	East Rutherford	United States	Giants Stadium	53,013 / 53,013	$1,722,923
13 June	Philadelphia	United States	Veterans Stadium	45,711 / 45,711	$1,288,394
15 June	Charlotte	United States	Blockbuster Pavilion	17,683 / 17,683	$507,655
3 September	Berlin	Germany	Waldbühne	—N/a	—N/a
5 September	Vienna	Austria	Wiener Stadthalle	—N/a	—N/a
6 September	Vienna	Austria	Wiener Stadthalle	—N/a	—N/a
9 September	Munich	Germany	Olympiahalle	—N/a	—N/a
11 September	London	England	Earls Court Exhibition Centre	—N/a	—N/a
14 September	London	England	Earls Court Exhibition Centre	—N/a	—N/a
15 September	London	England	Earls Court Exhibition Centre	—N/a	—N/a
18 September	Dortmund	Germany	Westfalenhalle	—N/a	—N/a
19 September	Dortmund	Germany	Westfalenhalle	—N/a	—N/a
21 September	Dortmund	Germany	Westfalenhalle	—N/a	—N/a
23 September	Stuttgart	Germany	Hanns-Martin Schleyerhalle	—N/a	—N/a
25 September	Gothenburg	Sweden	Scandinavium	—N/a	—N/a
27 September	Oslo	Norway	Oslo Spektrum	—N/a	—N/a
28 September	Oslo	Norway	Oslo Spektrum	—N/a	—N/a
1 October	Stockholm	Sweden	The Globe	—N/a	—N/a
3 October	Mannheim	Germany	Maimarkthalle	—N/a	—N/a
5 October	Stuttgart	Germany	Hanns-Martin Schleyerhalle	—N/a	—N/a
6 October	Frankfurt	Germany	Festhalle	—N/a	—N/a
9 October	Rotterdam	Netherlands	Ahoy Sportpaleis	—N/a	—N/a
10 October	Rotterdam	Netherlands	Ahoy Sportpaleis	—N/a	—N/a
13 October	Paris	France	Palais Onmisports de Bercy	—N/a	—N/a
14 October	Paris	France	Palais Onmisports de Bercy	—N/a	—N/a
17 October	Ghent	Belgium	Flanders Expo	—N/a	—N/a
20 October	Toulon	France	The Zenith	—N/a	—N/a
22 October	Florence	Italy	Palasport	—N/a	—N/a
23 October	Florence	Italy	Palasport	—N/a	—N/a
26 October	Barcelona	Spain	Palau Sant Jordi	—N/a	—N/a
27 October	Barcelona	Spain	Palau Sant Jordi	—N/a	—N/a
12 November	Tokyo	Japan	Tokyo Dome	—N/a	—N/a
14 November	Tokyo	Japan	Tokyo Dome	—N/a	—N/a
15 November	Tokyo	Japan	Tokyo Dome	—N/a	—N/a
18 November	Fukuoka	Japan	Fukuoka Dome	—N/a	—N/a
19 November	Fukuoka	Japan	Fukuoka Dome	—N/a	—N/a
25 November	Mexico City	Mexico	Autódromo Hermanos Rodríguez	101,910 / 101,910	$6,564,416
27 November	Mexico City	Mexico	Autódromo Hermanos Rodríguez	101,910 / 101,910	$6,564,416
3 December	São Paulo	Brazil	Estádio do Pacaembu	—N/a	—N/a
5 December	Curitiba	Brazil	Pedreira Paulo Leminski	—N/a	—N/a
10 December	Buenos Aires	Argentina	Estadio River Plate	—N/a	—N/a
11 December	Buenos Aires	Argentina	Estadio River Plate	—N/a	—N/a
12 December	Buenos Aires	Argentina	Estadio River Plate	—N/a	—N/a
16 December	Santiago	Chile	Estadio Nacional	—N/a	—N/a
Total				303,635 / 315,656 (96%)	$7,874,398

== Instruments played by band members ==
Songs	Paul McCartney	Stuart	McIntosh	Wix	Cunningham	Linda McCartney
"Drive My Car"	Bass	Electric guitar	Electric guitar	Keyboards	Drums	Tambourine
"Coming Up"	Bass	Electric guitar	Electric guitar	Keyboards	Drums	Keyboards
"Looking for Changes"	Bass	Electric guitar	Electric guitar	Keyboards	Drums	Tambourine
"Jet" or "Another Day"	Bass	Electric guitar or Acoustic guitar	Electric guitar	Keyboards or Acoustic guitar	Drums	Keyboards
"All My Loving"	Bass	Acoustic guitar	Electric guitar	Acoustic guitar	Drums	Tambourine
"Let Me Roll It"	Electric guitar	Bass	Electric guitar	Keyboards	Drums	Keyboards
"Peace in the Neighbourhood"	Electric guitar	Bass	Electric guitar	Keyboards	Drums	Keyboards
"Off the Ground"	Electric guitar	Bass	Electric guitar	Keyboards	Drums	Bell Stick
"Can't Buy Me Love"	Electric guitar	Bass	Electric guitar	Keyboards	Drums	Keyboards
Robbie's Bit	None	None	Acoustic guitar	None	None	None
"Good Rockin' Tonight"	Acoustic guitar	Acoustic bass	Acoustic guitar	Accordion	Drums	Drum
"We Can Work It Out"	Acoustic guitar	Acoustic bass	Acoustic guitar	Accordion	Drums	Tambourine
"I Lost My Little Girl" or "And I Love Her"	Acoustic guitar	Acoustic bass	Acoustic guitar	Maracas or Keyboards	Drums	Shaker or Keyboards
"Ain't No Sunshine" or "Every Night"	Drums or Acoustic guitar	Acoustic bass	Acoustic guitar	Keyboards	Triangle or Drums	Shaker or Tambourine
"Hope of Deliverance"	Acoustic guitar	Bass	Acoustic guitar	Acoustic guitar	Drums	Autoharp
"Michelle"	Acoustic guitar	Bass	Acoustic guitar	Shaker/Accordion	Drums	Maracas
"Biker Like an Icon"	Acoustic guitar	Bass	Electric guitar	Accordion	Drums	Keyboards
"Here, There and Everywhere"	Acoustic guitar	Bass	Acoustic guitar	Accordion	Drums	Keyboards
"Yesterday"	Acoustic guitar	None	None	Keyboards	None	None
"My Love"	Piano	Bass	Electric guitar	Keyboards	Drums	Keyboards
"Lady Madonna"	Piano	Bass	Electric guitar	Keyboards	Drums	Tambourine
"C'Mon People"	Piano	Bass	Electric guitar	Keyboards	Drums	Keyboards
"Magical Mystery Tour"	Piano	Bass	Electric guitar	Keyboards	Drums	Keyboards
"Let It Be"	Piano	Bass	Electric guitar	Keyboards	Drums	Keyboards
"Live and Let Die"	Piano	Bass	Electric guitar	Keyboards	Drums	Keyboards
"The Long and Winding Road" (only in some cities)	Piano	Bass	Electric guitar	Keyboards	Drums	Keyboards
"Paperback Writer"	Bass	Electric guitar	Electric guitar	Keyboards	Drums	Keyboards
"Fixing a Hole" (only in some cities)	Bass	Electric guitar	Electric guitar	Keyboards	Drums	Keyboards
"Back in the U.S.S.R."	Bass	Electric guitar	Electric guitar	Keyboards	Drums	Keyboards
"Penny Lane"	Bass	Electric guitar	Electric guitar	Keyboards	Drums	Keyboards
"Sgt. Pepper's Lonely Hearts Club Band/Sgt. Pepper's Lonely Hearts Club Band (reprise)"	Electric guitar	Bass	Electric guitar	Keyboards	Drums	Keyboards
"Band on the Run"	Bass	Electric guitar/Acoustic guitar	Electric guitar	Keyboards	Drums	Keyboards
"I Saw Her Standing There"	Bass	Electric guitar	Electric guitar	Keyboards	Drums	Keyboards
"Hey Jude"	Piano	Bass	Electric guitar	Keyboards	Drums	Tambourine/Keyboards
