= Paul Is Live =

1993 live album by Paul McCartney

Live album by Paul McCartney
- Released: 8 November 1993
- Recorded: 22 March – 15 June 1993
- Genre: Rock
- Length: 77:07
- Label: Parlophone
- Producer: Paul McCartney

Paul McCartney chronology
The Paul McCartney Collection (1993)	Paul Is Live (1993)	Strawberries Oceans Ships Forest (1993)

Paul Is Live – The New World Tour

Video by Paul McCartney
- Released: 22 March 1994
- Recorded: 1993
- Genre: Rock
- Length: 85 min.
- Labels: MPL; Rounder Home Video
- Director: Aubrey Powell
- Producer: Steven J. Swartz

Paul McCartney chronology
Get Back (1991)	Paul Is Live – The New World Tour (1994)	Live at the Cavern Club (2000)

Paul Is Live is a live album by Paul McCartney, released in 1993 during the New World Tour in support of his studio album Off the Ground, released that same year. Paul Is Live contains live recordings of McCartney and his touring band—which at the time included his wife Linda and guitarist Robbie McIntosh—performing songs by McCartney's former bands the Beatles and Wings, as well as songs from his solo career. The tracks included on the album were recorded at various concerts during his New World Tour, in several American cities and in Australia.

The title of Paul Is Live is a parody of the "Paul is dead" conspiracy theory, and the album's cover artwork, which is based on that of the Beatles' 1969 album Abbey Road, contains multiple references to the theory. Paul Is Live was McCartney's last live album for nine years, until the release of the double live album Back in the U.S., which coincided with his 2002 Driving World Tour.

== Title and cover ==
The album's title is a response to the "Paul is dead" rumours after the 1969 release of the Beatles' penultimate studio album, Abbey Road. The photograph used for the cover is from the same August 1969 photo session as the photo used for the Abbey Road album cover, with some digital manipulation. Differences between the two photos include different people and vehicles in the background, and on the Abbey Road cover, George Harrison is partly obscuring the left rear corner of the white Volkswagen Beetle, which is parked half up on the kerb on the left, whereas the cover of Paul Is Live gives a clear view of the car.

Apart from these, intentional differences between the two are:

- The "LMW281F" on the Volkswagen Beetle's number plate – which was mis-read as "LMW28IF", purportedly meaning that McCartney would have been 28 if he had lived (though McCartney was in fact 27 when Abbey Road was released in 1969, having been born in 1942) – is edited to read "51IS", indicating that he is alive and his age at the time was 51.
- McCartney is wearing shoes; on Abbey Road he had appeared with bare feet, while the other Beatles had shoes. This mismatch was viewed as an eyecatch to the hoax, in reference to the custom of burying the dead without shoes.
- McCartney is putting his left foot forward; on Abbey Road he is seen with his right foot forward, out of step with the others, and this was purportedly meant to symbolise his being on a different plane of existence.
- McCartney, who is left-handed, is seen holding a cigarette with his right hand on Abbey Road, supporting the idea that it was an impostor; in this cover, McCartney is holding the dog leash with his left hand.

The dog featured on the cover is an Old English Sheepdog McCartney owned named Arrow. Arrow was the offspring of McCartney's pet Martha, inspiration for the Beatles 1968 song "Martha My Dear".

== Release ==
Excerpted from his shows in Australia, as well as from various cities in the United States, Paul Is Live followed McCartney's previous live album Tripping the Live Fantastic by only three years. It became his lowest-selling live album, peaking at number 34 in the UK and number 78 in the US.

A concert film subtitled The New World Tour was subsequently released on VHS, and later on DVD. It was directed by Aubrey Powell. The video release includes the controversial pre-concert film, which features vintage footage of the Beatles, solo-era live footage of "Maybe I'm Amazed" and "Bluebird" from the Rockshow film, then switches tone by including graphic animal test footage (all of which is underscored by "Live and Let Die" and "Helter Skelter"), and, finally, warmup footage of the band. The program starts with the warm-up footage, and is played in full at the conclusion of the concert. The packaging included a disclaimer warning regarding the graphic nature of the animal footage.

Afterwards, McCartney took an extended break from his solo career to begin the Beatles Anthology project in early 1994 with George Harrison, Ringo Starr and George Martin. This took up much of his time for the next two years, before Flaming Pie in 1997.

== Reception ==
Professional ratings
Review scores
Source	Rating
AllMusic	2/5 stars
Calgary Herald	C−
Encyclopedia of Popular Music	2/5 stars
Entertainment Weekly (album)	B+
Entertainment Weekly (video)	B
The Essential Rock Discography	4/10
MusicHound	2.5/5 stars
The Rolling Stone Album Guide	3/5 stars

Stephen Thomas Erlewine, in a review of the album for AllMusic, called its tracks "competent but utterly unnecessary", and writing that, "it smacks of overkill to release this record, which has the exact same band and tone as Tripping the Live Fantastic." Conversely, Tom Sinclair of Entertainment Weekly wrote that "the most appealing thing about Paul Is Live is the spontaneity of the old boy's performances. What could easily have been a schmaltz revue sounds like 77 minutes of unpretentious rock & roll".

Reviewing the concert film, Entertainment Weekly's Ron Giver wrote: "The appeal of McCartney's rather restrained delivery is undercut, however, by the deadening way in which shots from different performances of the same song have been edited together into a hyperkinetic montage-and the airless way in which crowd noise has been eliminated."

== Track listing ==
=== Album ===
All tracks are written by Paul McCartney, except where noted.

No.	Title	Writer(s)	Venue	Length
1.	"Drive My Car"	John Lennon, McCartney	Arrowhead Stadium, Kansas City, Missouri, US 31 May 1993	2:32
2.	"Let Me Roll It"	McCartney, Linda McCartney	Folsom Field, Boulder, Colorado, US 26 May 1993	4:12
3.	"Looking for Changes"		Arrowhead Stadium, Kansas City, Missouri, US 31 May 1993	2:40
4.	"Peace in the Neighbourhood"		Folsom Field, Boulder, Colorado, US 26 May 1993	4:54
5.	"All My Loving"	Lennon–McCartney	Giants Stadium, East Rutherford, New Jersey, US 11 June 1993	2:16
6.	"Robbie's Bit (Thanks Chet)"	Robbie McIntosh	Blockbuster Pavilion, Charlotte, North Carolina, US 15 June 1993	1:57
7.	"Good Rockin' Tonight"	Roy Brown	Blockbuster Pavilion, Charlotte, North Carolina, US 15 June 1993	2:51
8.	"We Can Work It Out"	Lennon–McCartney	Giants Stadium, East Rutherford, New Jersey, US 11 June 1993	2:39
9.	"Hope of Deliverance"		Giants Stadium, East Rutherford, New Jersey, US 11 June 1993	3:32
10.	"Michelle"	Lennon–McCartney	Folsom Field, Boulder, Colorado, US 26 May 1993	2:56
11.	"Biker Like an Icon"		Folsom Field, Boulder, Colorado, US 26 May 1993	3:40
12.	"Here, There and Everywhere"	Lennon–McCartney	Parramatta Stadium, Parramatta, Sydney, Australia 22 March 1993	2:29
13.	"My Love"	P. McCartney, L. McCartney	Alamodome, San Antonio, Texas, US 29 May 1993	4:06
14.	"Magical Mystery Tour"	Lennon–McCartney	Parramatta Stadium, Parramatta, Sydney, Australia 22 March 1993	3:15
15.	"C'Mon People"		Arrowhead Stadium, Kansas City, Missouri, US 31 May 1993	5:38
16.	"Lady Madonna"	Lennon–McCartney	Georgia Dome, Atlanta, Georgia, US 1 May 1993	2:30
17.	"Paperback Writer"	Lennon–McCartney	Blockbuster Pavilion, Charlotte, North Carolina, US 15 June 1993	2:36
18.	"Penny Lane"	Lennon–McCartney	Folsom Field, Boulder, Colorado, US 26 May 1993	3:02
19.	"Live and Let Die"	P. McCartney, L. McCartney	Folsom Field, Boulder, Colorado, US 26 May 1993	3:53
20.	"Kansas City"	Jerry Leiber, Mike Stoller	Arrowhead Stadium, Kansas City, Missouri, US 31 May 1993	3:53
21.	"Welcome to Soundcheck" (link)			0:41
22.	"Hotel in Benidorm" (soundcheck)		Folsom Field, Boulder, Colorado, US 26 May 1993	2:00
23.	"I Wanna Be Your Man" (soundcheck)	Lennon–McCartney	Parramatta Stadium, Parramatta, Sydney, Australia 22 March 1993	2:36
24.	"A Fine Day" (soundcheck)		Giants Stadium, East Rutherford, New Jersey, US 11 June 1993	6:19
Total length:				77:07

Notes

- "Robbie's Bit (Thanks Chet)" is a solo performance by guitarist Robbie McIntosh, "inspired by Chet Atkins".
- Tracks 5, 8, 9, and 24 were recorded at Giants Stadium, East Rutherford, New Jersey, on 11 June 1993; they are described on the vinyl, CD, and digital releases of the album as having been recorded "Live in New York".

=== Video release ===
1. "Drive My Car" (Lennon–McCartney)
2. "Let Me Roll It" (P. McCartney, L. McCartney)
3. "Looking for Changes"
4. "Peace in the Neighbourhood"
5. "All My Loving" (Lennon–McCartney)
6. "Good Rocking Tonight" (Brown)
7. "We Can Work It Out" (Lennon–McCartney)
8. "Hope of Deliverance"
9. "Michelle" (Lennon–McCartney)
10. "Biker Like an Icon"
11. "Here, There and Everywhere" (Lennon–McCartney)
12. "Magical Mystery Tour" (Lennon–McCartney)
13. "C'Mon People"
14. "Lady Madonna" (Lennon–McCartney)
15. "Paperback Writer" (Lennon–McCartney)
16. "Penny Lane" (Lennon–McCartney)
17. "Live and Let Die" (P. McCartney, L. McCartney)
18. "Kansas City" (Leiber, Stoller)
19. "Let It Be" (Lennon–McCartney)
20. "Yesterday" (Lennon–McCartney)
21. "Hey Jude" (Lennon–McCartney)

== Band line-up ==
- Paul McCartney – lead vocals, acoustic, electric and bass guitars, piano
- Linda McCartney – backing vocals, keyboards, percussion, autoharp
- Hamish Stuart – acoustic and electric guitars, acoustic and electric bass guitars, backing vocals
- Robbie McIntosh – acoustic and electric guitars, backing vocals
- Paul 'Wix' Wickens – keyboards, accordion, acoustic guitar, percussion, backing vocals
- Blair Cunningham – drums, percussion

== Charts ==
=== Weekly charts ===
Album release

Chart (1993–1994)	Position
Austrian Albums Chart	38
Dutch Mega Albums Chart	60
German Media Control Albums Chart	44
Japanese Oricon Albums Chart	16
Spanish Albums Chart	13
Swedish Albums Chart	23
UK Albums Chart	34
US Billboard 200	78

=== Certifications ===
Album release

Region	Certification	Certified units/sales
Spain (Promusicae)	Gold	50,000^{^}
^{^} Shipments figures based on certification alone.

Video release

Region	Certification	Certified units/sales
United States (RIAA)	Gold	50,000^{^}
^{^} Shipments figures based on certification alone.
