= Dave Griffiths (musician) =

English musician

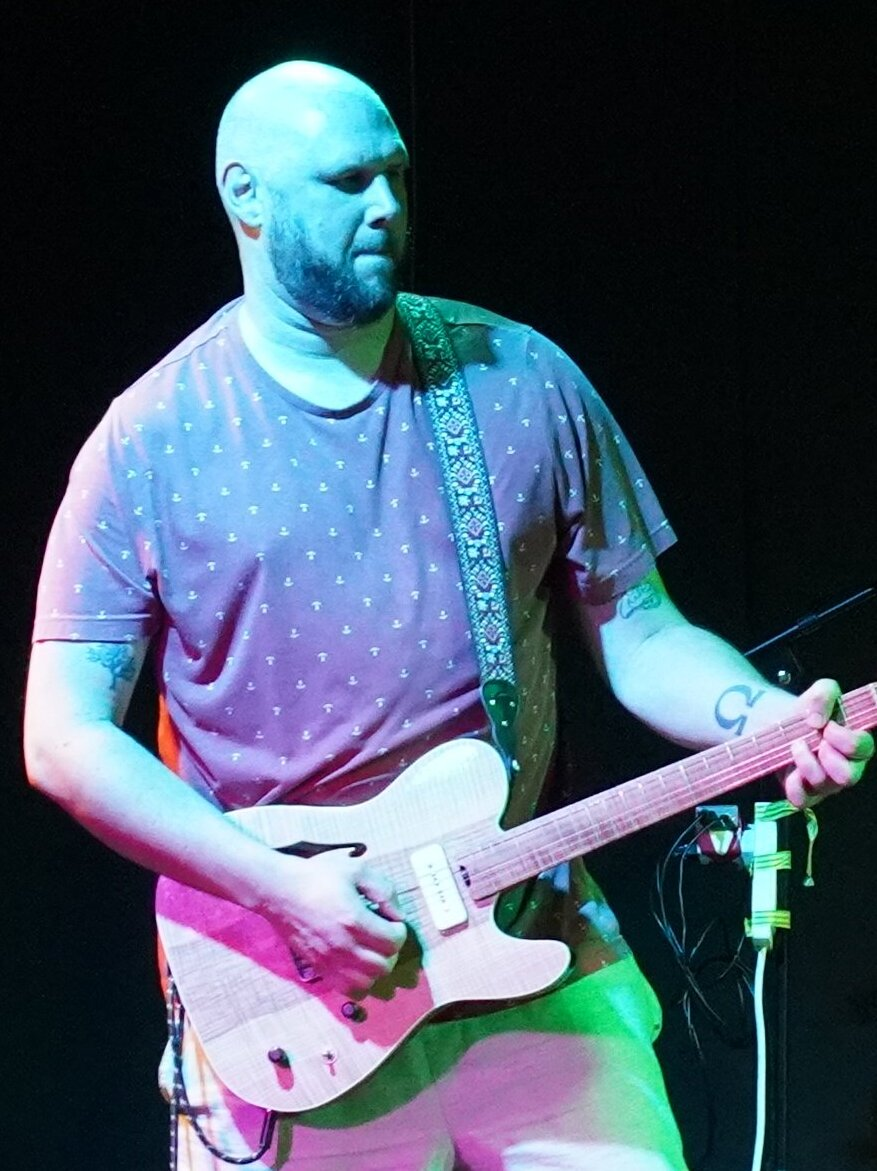
- Griffiths with Held By Trees in 2025

Background information
- Also known as: David Joseph
- Born: David Joseph Griffiths; 21 November 1983 (age 42); Reading, Berkshire, England
- Genres: Worship; Christian pop; pop rock; ambient; post rock; progressive rock
- Occupations: Singer, songwriter, guitarist, producer
- Instruments: Vocals, guitar, piano, bass, drums, percussion
- Years active: 1996–present
- Labels: Risen Records, Tweed Jacket Music, Lasgo
- Website: davegriff.net

David Joseph Griffiths (born 21 November 1983) is an English Christian musician and guitarist, who plays a Christian pop and Christian rock music. He has released three extended plays, Horizons (2005) and The Way Through the Land (2013), The Brutal Years (2017), and a studio album, Here & Now (2016). In 2018 Dave began releasing instrumental ambient music that heavily used field recordings. In 2020 Dave began Held By Trees and began using David Joseph, his middle name, for the promotional campaign so as to distinguish between projects.

== Early life ==
David Joseph Griffiths was born on 21 November 1983, in Reading, England, before his family moved to Bournemouth where he was raised with brother and fellow band member of Bosh, Michael "Mike" Griffiths, and sister, Amy.

== Music career ==
His music career began in 1996, with his band, Bosh along with Mike Griffiths. The brothers experimented with home recording with equipment borrowed from their school and family friends before David worked all summer on leaving school so he could buy his own digital eight-track recorder. Bosh recorded several collections at home and featured future Fat White Family member, Adam Harmer. In 2004 the line-up settled with Grant Howard, Matt Gainsford and James Grant. Bosh released several recordings and toured extensively in their later years, finally disbanding in 2011.

From 2011 - 2021 Dave recorded and released music with various friends as Chaos Curb Collaboration, which was aimed at a Christian audience and tried to push boundaries in worship music.

Dave's first solo project was a home recorded album Ancient Lights AD1905 named after a wooden sign hung beneath his bedroom window, where he recorded most of the music. Dave played every instrument on the album himself. This was distributed on CDRs with home-printed artwork in 2002. A self-released studio-recorded extended play, Horizons, was released in 2005 and featured the members of Bosh. He released, The Way Through The Land, in 2013, another extended play. His first proper studio album, Here & Now, released in 2016.

A further EP, The Brutal Years followed in 2017, drawing heavily on the influence of Sonic Youth, Graham Coxon and Weezer.

In 2018 Dave released a compilation of 'curios and collaborations' featuring previously unreleased Bosh, Chaos Curb and solo songs and instrumental compositions. The instrumental Dorset was picked up by Salt of the Sound and became popular in ambient music playlists. Dave then began to compose and release more instrumental music including the series The Liturgy of the Hours. In 2019 Dave released Dawn Returning with Tim Renwick, touring guitarist with Pink Floyd and Eric Clapton, two of Dave's biggest influences.

In 2020 Dave began an instrumental project called Held By Trees which has released two LPs and three EPs and brought musicians together such as Robbie McIntosh, Eric Bibb, Martin Smith, and members, touring members and former members of Supergrass, Wire, Blur, Primal Scream, Slowdive, Band of Susans, Dire Straits, Bark Psychosis, Swans, My Bloody Valentine, and Pink Floyd. Held By Trees continues to be Dave's prime musical focus.

In 2023 Dave released a compilation of his retro-pop/synthwave and 1980s inspired music across Chaos Curb, his solo work, and aborted projects like The Future Dances. Analogue Sunset is only available on streaming services.

== Discography ==
Studio albums

- Here & Now (2016)

EPs

- Horizons (2005)
- The Way Through the Land (2013)
- The Brutal Years (2017)

Compilations

- Inter-sessions (2018)
- Analogue Sunset (2023)
