= Off the Ground (song) =

- Photo taken 1977.

Single by Paul McCartney

from the album Off the Ground
- B-side: "Cosmically Conscious" (7"); "Style Style" (CD Single); "Sweet Sweet Memories" (CD Single); "Soggy Noodle" (CD Single)
- Released: 19 April 1993
- Recorded: December 1991 – July 1992
- Studio: Hogg Hill Mill (Icklesham, UK)
- Genre: Rock, pop
- Length: 3:39
- Label: Parlophone/EMI
- Songwriter: Paul McCartney
- Producers: Paul McCartney; Julian Mendelsohn

Paul McCartney singles chronology
"C'Mon People" (1993)	"Off the Ground" (1993)	"Biker Like an Icon" (1993)

"Off the Ground" is a song by the English musician Paul McCartney and is from the album from the same name. This was one of McCartney's first songs made using a computer. The video can be seen on the DVD collection, The McCartney Years. The video was shot by Industrial Light & Magic. Some behind the scenes footage can be seen on the out of print VHS, Movin' On. The video features "Soggy Noodle", a short acoustic piece played as an intro which can be found as a B-side on the single release. In the US, it reached number 27 on the Adult Contemporary chart.

The song was played live during the New World Tour that followed the release of the album; however, the song was not included on the live album, Paul Is Live.

== Track listings ==
7" single

1. "Off the Ground"
2. "Cosmically Conscious"

CD single

1. "Off the Ground" – 3:38
2. "Cosmically Conscious" – 4:39
3. "Style Style" – 5:59
4. "Sweet Sweet Memories" – 4:02
5. "Soggy Noodle" - 0:28

Promo CD single 1

1. "Off the Ground" (Bob Clearmountain Remix) – 3:40

Promo CD single 2

1. "Off the Ground" (Keith Cohen Remix) – 3:42

Promo CD single 3

1. "Off the Ground" (Keith Cohen AC Remix) – 3:38

== Personnel ==
According to The Paul McCartney Project:

- Paul McCartney – lead and backing vocals, drums, percussion
- Linda McCartney – backing vocals
- Robbie McIntosh – electric guitar, percussion
- Paul Wickens – backing vocals, computer programming, keyboards, piano, synth-bass
- Hamish Stuart – backing vocals, percussion

== Charts ==
Chart performance for "Off the Ground"
Chart (1993)	Peak position
Australia (ARIA)	66
Canada Top Singles (RPM)	37
Germany (GfK)	54
US Adult Contemporary (Billboard)	27
