= Here, There and Everywhere =

1966 song by the Beatles

- Cover of the Northern Songs sheet music (licensed to Sonora Musikförlag)

Song by the Beatles

from the album Revolver
- Released: 5 August 1966
- Recorded: 14–17 June 1966
- Studio: EMI, London
- Genre: Soft rock; pop
- Length: 2:29
- Label: Parlophone
- Songwriter: Lennon–McCartney
- Producer: George Martin

Music video
- "Here, There and Everywhere" on YouTube

"Here, There and Everywhere" is a song by the English rock band the Beatles from their seventh studio album, Revolver (1966). Credited to Lennon–McCartney, it was written by Paul McCartney at John Lennon's home in June 1966. McCartney was heavily inspired by the Beach Boys' 1966 song "God Only Knows", enthused by the group's harmonies. Described as a soft rock and pop song, the lyrics were inspired by Jane Asher, McCartney's girlfriend at the time.

The song was recorded on 14 June 1966 at EMI Studios in London, with additional overdubbing taking place on 16 and 17 June. On the first day, they taped the song four times before taping it another nine times. They eventually settled on the fourteenth take, adding various overdubs to take thirteen. The recording was produced by George Martin and engineered by Geoff Emerick.

"Here, There and Everywhere" was released on 5 August 1966 through EMI's Parlophone, appearing on Revolver. The song received positive reviews from critics upon its release, with many deeming it a standout on the album. McCartney considers it one of his favourite Beatles songs, and as a solo artist, he has included the song on various live albums and live performances of his. "Here, There and Everywhere" often features high up in rankings of the Beatles' discography, and it was named by Mojo as the fourth greatest song of all time in 2000. It has been covered by Emmylou Harris, as well as by Sean Lennon and Elvis Costello for McCartney's 80th birthday. In April 2025, the song was certified silver by the British Phonographic Industry (BPI).

== Background and recording ==
Following the critical acclaim of Rubber Soul (1965), the Beatles began recording their next studio album, Revolver, in April 1966. During Paul McCartney's stay at John Lennon's house in June 1966 at Weybridge, he began developing "Here, There and Everywhere". (Note: While written by McCartney, the song was credited to the Lennon–McCartney songwriting partnership.) After hearing the Beach Boys' album Pet Sounds (1966), he was influenced by the track "God Only Knows", particularly by the group's harmony arrangements. According to his recollection, McCartney was waiting for Lennon to wake up while he was out by Lennon's pool with his guitar, and then began strumming in E major. By the time Lennon had woken up, he had written most of the song, and they went inside to finish it. The lyrics were written about McCartney's then girlfriend, Jane Asher.

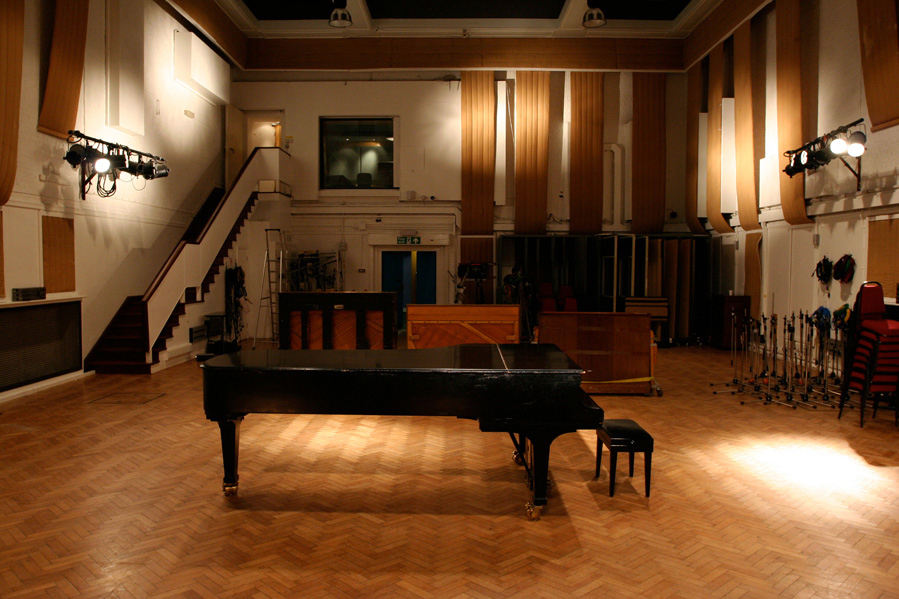
Abbey Road Studio Two (formerly EMI Studios), where "Here, There and Everywhere" was recorded

"Here, There and Everywhere" was the second to last song recorded for Revolver. It was recorded on 14 June 1966 at EMI Studio Two in London, with overdubbing sessions taking place on 16 and 17 June. George Martin produced it, and Geoff Emerick engineered it. During the period of seven hours on the first day of recording, they recorded the song four times, with McCartney providing rhythm guitar and guide vocals. The recording featured harmonies, double-tracked vocals and layered guitars. After McCartney and Ringo Starr further recorded it, they settled on the fourth take, and received an overdub of three-part block harmonies. The band later returned to the studio, this time with Lennon and George Harrison present. Unsatisfied with the fourth take, they recorded it another nine times with Harrison on lead guitar. Lennon, although present, did not play on the track. The drums, bass and electric guitar parts were all completed by the thirteenth take. The group settled on take fourteen, overdubbing new backing vocals onto take thirteen. McCartney and Harrison recorded additional overdubs on 17 June, and the final song was completed in mono and stereo mixing on 21 June.

== Composition and musical structure ==
"Here, There and Everywhere" is a ballad in the soft rock and pop genres. It follows a 4/4 time signature and switches between the keys of G major and B♭ major. It comprises an opening intro, followed by a verse and a refrain, both repeated twice before ending with an outro. The verse is based on an ascending major chord sequence, while the middle eight (four bars in length) modulates to the relative major of the tonic (I chord). The introduction beginning with "To lead a better life" opens in the key of G major and involves a I–iii–♭III–ii–V^{7} progression. The ♭III (B♭ chord) on "I need my love to be here" (arpeggiated in the melody line) is a dissonant substitute for the more predictable VI (E^{7}) that would normally lead to the ii (Am) chord.

The first verse also opens in G major (with a simultaneous I (G chord) and melody G note) and moves to a I–ii–iii–IV chord shift (G–Am–Bm–C) through "making each day of the year". This repeats on "Changing my life with a wave", but immediately after (in bar five), the song changes on "of her hand". It goes down six semitones from the IV (C chord) to a vii (F♯m) [adding a non-G scale C♯] then a V-of-vi (B^{7}) chord [adding a non-G scale D♯] which briefly modulates towards a new tonic E minor. McCartney mostly sings a B note ("of her hand") over both F♯ minor, where it is the eleventh, and the B^{7}, where it is the tonic. When the sequence is repeated ("nobody can"), McCartney sings both B and C natural over the F♯ minor note – the C natural producing a tritone.

During the bridge starting with "I want her everywhere", the key centre shifts via an F^{7} chord (a ♭VII in the old G key and a V^{7} in the new B♭ key) to a I–vi–ii (B♭–Gm–Cm) chord progression in B♭ major. It then shifts again via a D^{7} chord (a III^{7} in the old B♭ key and a V^{7} in the new Gm key) to G minor where there is a i–iv (Gm–Cm chord) progression. Finally, the pivot of D^{7} takes the scale back to the G major tonic and reinforcing G melody note of the song. The staff of Rolling Stone states: "The tune's chord sequence bears Brian Wilson's [of the Beach Boys] influence, ambling through three related keys without ever fully settling into one, and the modulations – particularly the one on the line 'changing my life with a wave of her hand' – deftly underscore the lyrics, inspired by McCartney's girlfriend, actress Jane Asher."

== Release and reception ==
EMI's Parlophone label issued "Here, There and Everywhere" in the United Kingdom on 5 August 1966, as part of side one on Revolver. It was sequenced between "Love You To" and "Yellow Submarine". "Here, There and Everywhere" subsequently featured on the 1977 compilation album Love Songs and as a B-side to the CD edition of "Real Love", which included the seventh and thirteenth takes combined into one. A re–recorded version was included in McCartney's 1984 film, Give My Regards to Broad Street. In December 2022, a music video for the song, directed by Rok Predina, was uploaded the band's official YouTube channel to promote the 2022 deluxe edition of Revolver.

McCartney (pictured in 1970) has stated that "Here, There and Everywhere" is one of his favourite Beatles songs.

"Here, There and Everywhere" received positive reviews from critics, and some have considered it a standout track on Revolver. In his book The Album, James Perone describes it as a "mid 1960s love ballad that could find its way into the set list for bands at a senior prom" and a track that may sound "syrupy and mushy" to listeners. Richie Unterberger, in his review for AllMusic, describes "Here, There and Everywhere" as one of its author's "outstanding contribution[s]" to love balladry and a song with "the sound of an instant standard". Tim Riley says that "Here, There and Everywhere" "domesticates" the "eroticisms" of "Love You To", and he praises the composition as "the most perfect song" that McCartney had written up to that point. Journalist Hunter Davies referred to "Here, There and Everywhere" as "a pearl of a song". Scott Plagenhoef, writing for Pitchfork, called "Here, There and Everywhere" "a model of sepia-toned sentimentality". Chris Coplan of Consequence of Sound compared it with "Got to Get You into My Life", in his view, both feel "out of place" amid the overtly psychedelic and experimental music on Revolver. Both Lennon and McCartney have called it one of their favourite Beatles songs. On 11 April 2025, "Here, There and Everywhere" was certified silver by the British Phonographic Industry, indicating sales of over 200,000.

"Here, There and Everywhere" often appears near the top of Beatles songs rankings. Music critic Jim Bevigila classified "Here, There and Everywhere" as the 26th best Beatles song in his book Counting Down The Beatles: Their 100 Finest Songs (2017), calling it the "heart" of Revolver. In 2000, Mojo named it the fourth greatest song of all time, and it also appeared at number 25 in Rolling Stone's 2010 list of the 100 best Beatles songs. "Here, There and Everywhere" made an NME list of the 100 greatest Beatles songs in 2015 as chosen by popular musicians and critics, with the English singer-songwriter Little Boots nominating it, who called it a "touching and intimate song". Bill Wyman of Vulture ranked it at number seven out of 214 in his ranking of every Beatles song, Mark Beaumont of NME placed it at number 34 out of 188, and music journalist Michael Gallucci listed it at 45 out of 229. Since its release, "Here, There and Everywhere", has become highly popular among mainstream recording artists.

== Covers and live renditions ==
The American singer-songwriter Emmylou Harris recorded a cover for her third studio album, Elite Hotel (1975). McCartney has performed "Here, There and Everywhere" several times as a solo artist, including during his 1991 Unplugged Tour, the New World Tour (1993), the 2002 Driving World Tour and the 2003 Back in the World tour. It has also appeared on his live albums Unplugged (The Official Bootleg) (1991), Paul Is Live (1993), Back in the U.S. (2002), and Back in the World (2003). In 2022, Lennon's son, Sean, and the English musician Elvis Costello both performed a cover of "Here, There and Everywhere" in celebration of McCartney's 80th birthday.

== Personnel ==
According to Ian MacDonald, except where noted:

- Paul McCartney – double-tracked lead vocals, rhythm guitar, acoustic guitar, bass, finger-snaps
- John Lennon – backing vocals, finger-snaps
- George Harrison – lead guitar, backing vocals, finger-snaps
- Ringo Starr – drums, finger-snaps

== Certifications ==
Certifications for "Here, There And Everywhere"
Region	Certification	Certified units/sales
United Kingdom (BPI)	Silver	200,000^{‡}
^{‡} Sales+streaming figures based on certification alone.
