= Biker Like an Icon =

Single by Paul McCartney

from the album Off the Ground
- B-side: 1. "Things We Said Today" (live) (7"); 2. "Biker Like an Icon" (live) (CD Single 2); 3. "Midnight Special" (live) (CD Single 3); 4. "Mean Woman Blues" (live) (Promo CD Single)
- Released: 8 November 1993
- Recorded: 25 November 1991
- Studio: Hog Hill Mill, Icklesham
- Genre: Rock
- Length: 3:24
- Label: Parlophone
- Songwriter: Paul McCartney
- Producers: Paul McCartney; Julian Mendelsohn

Paul McCartney singles chronology
"Off the Ground" (1993)	"Biker Like an Icon" (1993)	"Transpiritual Stomp" (1993)

"Biker Like an Icon" is a song by Paul McCartney from his 1993 album Off the Ground. It was released a fourth single from the album as 7-inch and CDs.

== Music video ==
The music video for the song first aired on MTV's First Look television show. The clip was repeated the following day.

== B-sides ==
A live version of the song "Biker Like an Icon" is taken from Paul Is Live album. The songs "Things We Said Today" and "Midnight Special" were recorded live at the MTV Unplugged in 1991 but not included on McCartney's Unplugged (The Official Bootleg) live album. Additional track from MTV Unplugged, "Mean Woman Blues", was released only on promotional single.

== Track listing ==
7-inch single, CD single version 1

1. "Biker Like an Icon" – 3:24
2. "Things We Said Today" (live) – 3:55

CD single version 2

1. "Biker Like an Icon" – 3:24
2. "Biker Like an Icon" (live) – 3:40

CD single version 3

1. "Biker Like an Icon" – 3:24
2. "Midnight Special" (live) – 4:42
3. "Things We Said Today" (live) – 3:48
4. "Biker Like an Icon" (live) – 3:40

Promo CD single

1. "Biker Like an Icon" – 3:24
2. "Things We Said Today" (live) – 3:55
3. "Mean Woman Blues" (live) – 3:03
4. "Midnight Special" (live) – 5:11

== Personnel ==
According to The Paul McCartney Project:

- Paul McCartney – lead and backing vocals, acoustic guitar, percussion
- Linda McCartney – keyboards
- Robbie McIntosh – slide guitar
- Hamish Stuart – backing vocals, bass
- Paul Wickens – keyboards, piano
- Blair Cunningham – drums
