= Held By Trees =

English post-rock band

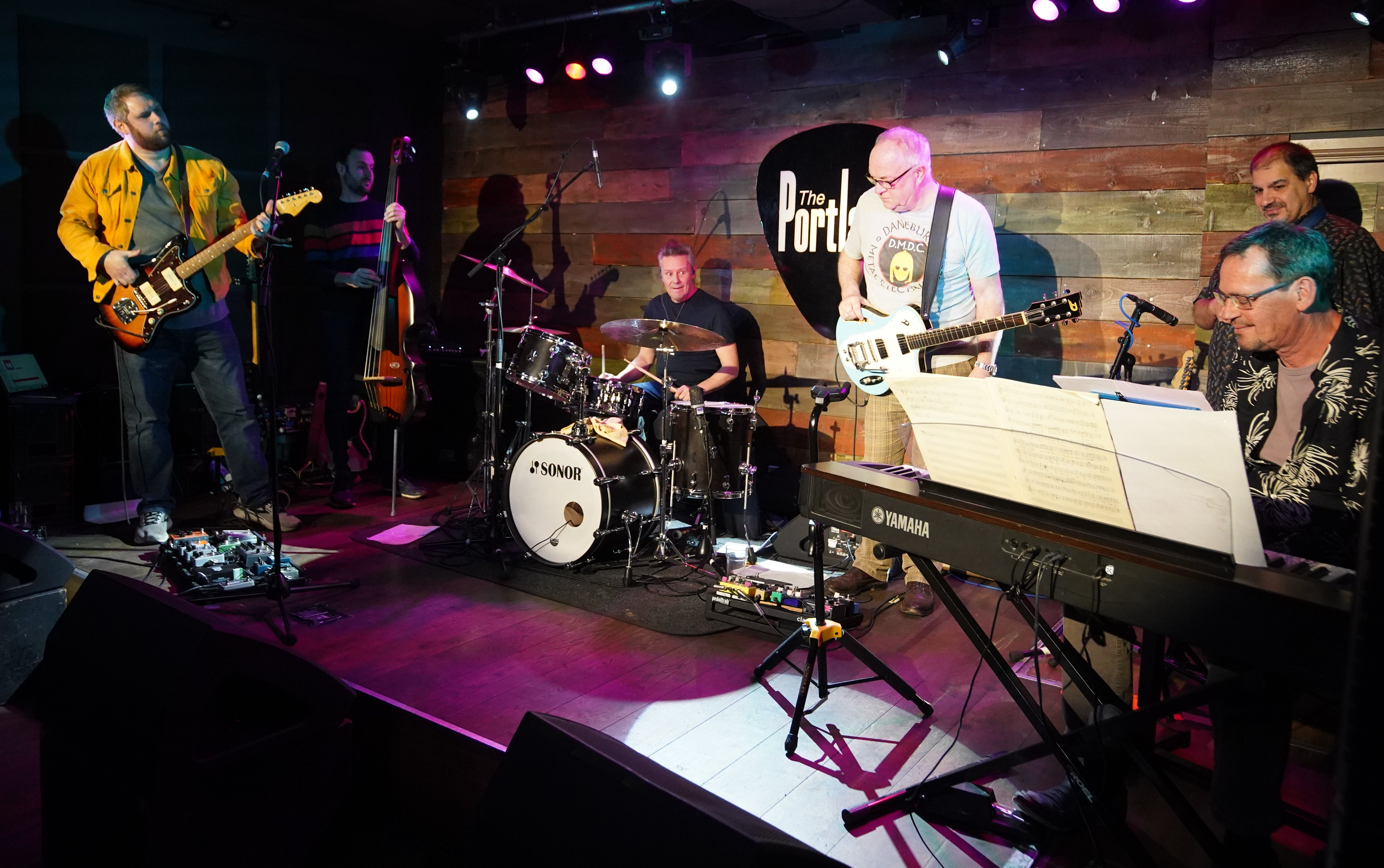
- Held By Trees performing in Cambridge in 2023

Background information
- Genres: Post-rock; instrumental rock; progressive rock
- Years active: 2021–present
- Members: David Joseph; Robbie McIntosh; Laurence Pendrous; Andy Panayi; James Grant; Paul Beavis
- Past members: Martin Ditcham; Simon Edwards

Held By Trees are an English instrumental post rock project, founded by multi-instrumentalist David Joseph. The group's main influence is Talk Talk and Mark Hollis, specifically the albums The Colour Of Spring (1986), Spirit Of Eden (1988), Laughing Stock (1991), as well as Mark Hollis (1998).

The project was founded by Joseph during the first COVID-19 lockdown, he had previously collaborated with guitarist Tim Renwick who introduced him to Talk Talk audio engineer Phill Brown, who then got him in contact with percussionist Martin Ditcham, another Talk Talk associate. Through studio owner Steve Smith, he was also put in contact with guitarist Robbie McIntosh, an associate of Talk Talk, Paul McCartney and the Pretenders. The two then reached out to pianist Laurence Pendrous, woodwind player Andy Panayi (both of whom played on Mark Hollis), and to late era Talk Talk bassist Simon Edwards. They all agreed to join the project.

The group released their first album, Solace, in April 2022, charting on the indie and physical sales charts in the UK. It featured Joseph, McIntosh, Ditcham, Pendrous, Panayi, Edwards, Renwick, David Knopfler, Eric Bibb and Gary Alesbrook among others.

When the group started touring, they consisted of Joseph, McIntosh, Pendrous and Panayi, as well as bassist James Grant (formerly of David's previous bands BOSH and Chaos Curb) and drummer Paul Beavis (Andy Fairweather-Low and Robbie McIntosh Band). The group has since recorded two live albums, Solace ~ Live at Real World Studios and Live in the Field, featuring the usual touring group.

The group have also released a second EP, Eventide in September 2023, which features pieces written in the rehearsals for their first live dates, as well as improvised compositions, and was recorded at Peter Gabriel’s Real World Studios. and features guests Grant Howard (Hammond organ, Wurlitzer piano, synths) and Matt Gainsford (additional guitar pad on "Grow Dark").

In 2024, the group teamed up with vocalist Martin Smith and guitarist Stuart Gerrard, both formerly of Delirious?, and recorded a new self titled EP, also featuring Grant Howard (Hammond organ, synth), Daniel Newberry (saxophone), Ryan Rich (synth bass), Anita Tatlow (vocals). The group also played two live dates with Smith in November 2024.

Held By Trees released their second full LP, Hinterland, in April 2025, returning to their instrumental sound. The album features many of the core musicians from previous releases but includes Charlie Hollis, son of Mark Hollis, on piano on four pieces. Also contributing parts; Rob Coombes of Supergrass, Matt Simms of Wire, Norman Westberg of Swans, Robert Poss of Band of Susans, Simon Scott of Slowdive, Mark Simnett, formerly of Bark Psychosis, and Simone Marie Butler of Primal Scream. The album explores themes of ambiguity and is more ambient and also more heavy than their largely pastoral debut.

== Members ==
Core Members and current live band

- David Joseph – guitar, piano, occasional vocals (2021–present)
- Robbie McIntosh – lead guitar (2021–present)
- Laurence Pendrous – piano, keyboards (2021–present)
- Andy Panayi – flute, saxophone, clarinet (2021–present)
- James Grant – double bass, bass (2022–present)
- Paul Beavis – drums (2022–present)

Studio contributors

- Martin Ditcham – drums, percussion
- Simon Edwards – bass, double bass
- Gary Alesbrook - trumpet
- Eric Bibb - guitar
- Charlie Hollis - piano
- Tim Renwick - guitar
- Ben Taylor - double bass
- Chris Mears - bowed guitar
- Steve Smith - Hammond organ
- David Knopfler - guitar
- Mike Smith - saxophone
- Phill Brown - sound effects, mix engineer
- Grant Howard - keyboards, synths
- Peter Moon - synthesiser, electric viola, piano, variophon
- Matt Gainsford - guitar
- Mary Apperley - cello
- Oskar Apperley - viola
- Tristan Apperley - violin
- Stuart Garrard - guitar
- Martin Smith - vocals, guitar
- Daniel Newberry - saxophone
- Ryan Rich - synth bass
- Sven Atterton- fretless bass
- Anita Tatlow - vocals
- Jason Upton - vocals
- Marc James - vocals
- Emilia Griffiths - backing vocals
- Lloyd Griffiths - backing vocals
- Naomi Griffiths - backing vocals
- Graeme Duffin - backing vocals
- Deborah Hartup - backing vocals
- Benjamin Tatlow - programming, keyboards, production
- Mark Simnett - drums, percussion
- Ruben Harsant - drums
- Clive Deemer - drums
- Paul Beavis - drums
- Johnnie Walker - drums
- Jen Macro - guitar
- Stephen Gilchrist - drums
- Norman Westberg - guitar
- Matt Simms - guitar
- Robert Poss - guitar
- Rob Coombes - Hammond organ
- Simon Scott - field recordings
- Simone Marie Butler - synthesisers, field recordings
- Chris Pedley - bass
- James Grant - bass
- Mike Griffiths - guitar
- Tom Kay - guitar
- Justin Klienst - guitar
- James Sharp - guitar
- Ivan Kaiser - cello
- David Evans - tape loops, additional mixing
- Jonnie Walker - percussion, studio engineer
- Denis Blackham - mastering engineer

== Discography ==
=== Album ===
- Solace (2022)
- Hinterland (2025)
- The Call of Home (2026)

=== EPs ===
- Eventide (2023)
- Solace - Live at Real World Studios (2023)
- Held By Trees & Martin Smith (2024) with Martin Smith

=== Singles ===
- "Next to Silence" (2021)
- "In the Trees" (2021)
- "Lay Your Troubles Down" (2024)
