= Off the Ground =

1993 studio album by Paul McCartney

Studio album by Paul McCartney
- Released: 1 February 1993
- Recorded: 1 September 1991 – 30 June 1992
- Studio: Hogg Hill Mill (Icklesham, UK); Hit Factory (London)
- Genre: Rock
- Length: 50:12
- Label: Parlophone (UK); Capitol (US)
- Producer: Paul McCartney; Julian Mendelsohn

Paul McCartney chronology
| Paul McCartney's Liverpool Oratorio (1991) | Off the Ground (1993) | The Paul McCartney Collection (1993) |

Paul McCartney studio album chronology
| Flowers in the Dirt (1989) | Off the Ground (1993) | Flaming Pie (1997) |

Singles from Off the Ground
- 1. "Hope of Deliverance" Released: 29 December 1992; 2. "C'Mon People" Released: 22 February 1993; 3. "Off the Ground" Released: 19 April 1993; 4. "Biker Like an Icon" Released: 8 November 1993

Off the Ground is the tenth solo studio album by the English musician Paul McCartney. It was released on 1 February 1993, through Parlophone in the United Kingdom and Capitol Records in the United States. The record was produced by McCartney with Julian Mendelsohn. As his first studio album of the 1990s, it is also the follow-up to the well-received Flowers in the Dirt (1989).

In contrast with the extensive list of personnel showcased on McCartney's previous albums, Off the Ground saw McCartney utilize a live-in-the-studio recording approach using only his touring band. Lyrically, the album sees McCartney delve deeper into social issues on songs such as "C'Mon People" and the animal rights anthem "Looking for Changes". Additionally, the record includes two tracks co-written with Elvis Costello, whom McCartney had previously worked with on Flowers in the Dirt.

Off the Ground was released to varying critical and commercial success. While the album reached number 5 in the UK and gained a top 20 hit with lead single "Hope of Deliverance", it only reached number 17 in the US, with the single stalling at number 83. The record was much more successful in Japan, where it sold better than its predecessor, and in mainland Europe, especially Germany, where it has become McCartney's most successful album.

== Recording and structure ==
After planning another world tour, the New World Tour, in 1993, to promote the album, McCartney chose to record Off the Ground with his touring band. Blair Cunningham joined on drums to replace Chris Whitten, who left to join Dire Straits.

McCartney decided to record the album "live in the studio", meaning that the band would rehearse an entire song then record it in one take, instead of recording each vocal track and instrumental track separately. This approach gave a raw, direct feel to the work.

The compositions, some of which were outtakes from Flowers in the Dirt, seemed less complex than those on the earlier album. "Mistress and Maid" and "The Lovers That Never Were", which emerged from McCartney's songwriting collaboration with Elvis Costello, made their appearance on this album. Costello, who had performed on Flowers in the Dirt, did not appear on Off the Ground.

McCartney chose co-producer Julian Mendelsohn to co-produce the album. He later told author Luca Perasi that McCartney "wanted spontaneity". The first two songs taped were "Biker like an Icon" and "Peace in the Neighbourhood", both derived from some album rehearsals in November 1991. Hamish Stuart played the bass on both tracks, using his Music Man Stingray 5-string.

Recording resumed in December 1991 and continued until at least July 1992, including overdubs. On 30 June 1992 George Martin arranged a large orchestra for "C'Mon People", while a trio of Latin percussion was overdubbed onto "Hope of Deliverance" on 17 July 1992.

McCartney's increased interest in social issues came to prominence on this album, with the anti-animal cruelty rocker "Looking for Changes" (McCartney and his wife Linda both being long-time vegetarians by this time) and paeans for a better world ("Hope of Deliverance" and "C'Mon People"). The B-Side "Big Boys Bickering" lambasted politicians, with the phrase "Big boys bickering, fucking it up for everyone" showing a more aggressive side of McCartney and rare use of a swear word in the song. Another notable B-Side is "Long Leather Coat", a protest song co-written by Linda McCartney.

The CD's hidden track, a short excerpt of "Cosmically Conscious", was written by McCartney in 1968 during The Beatles' stay in Rishikesh, India. A full-length version of the recording was released as the B-Side of the "Off the Ground" single and later included on Off the Ground: The Complete Works.

McCartney would ask Youth, an electronic music producer, to remix tracks from the album for potential releases as 12" singles. These remixes would evolve into the Strawberries Oceans Ships Forest album, the first release by the McCartney and Youth collaboration, The Fireman. A remix of "Hope of Deliverance" by Steve Anderson would be released as a 12" single instead, titled "Deliverance".

The feet on the album cover are of McCartney, his wife Linda, and his touring band.

This album was the penultimate McCartney studio album to feature vocals and participation from Linda, who died of breast cancer in 1998.

== Release and reception ==
Professional ratings
Review scores
| Source | Rating |
|---|---|
| AllMusic | 2/5 stars |
| Calgary Herald | B− |
| Chicago Tribune | (favourable) |
| Encyclopedia of Popular Music | 2/5 stars |
| Entertainment Weekly | C− |
| The Essential Rock Discography | 4/10 |
| Houston Chronicle | 3.5/5 stars |
| Los Angeles Times | 2.5/4 stars |
| MusicHound | 2.5/5 stars |
| Music Week | 3/5 stars |
| The New York Times | (favourable) |
| Q | 2/5 stars |
| Rolling Stone | 3.5/5 stars |
| The Rolling Stone Album Guide | 3/5 stars |

The lead single, "Hope of Deliverance", was released on 29 December 1992, and the album followed on 1 February 1993. Off the Ground was the first Paul McCartney album to contain no sizeable US hit singles since Wings' Wild Life in 1971. The album's first single barely reached the top 20, hitting number 18, in the UK, where "C'Mon People" became a minor hit as well. In the US, the album's title track also entered the Adult Contemporary chart at number 27. Singles from Off the Ground floundered on the US and the UK charts. However, "Hope of Deliverance" achieved commercial success elsewhere. It became McCartney's first international hit single since "Say, Say, Say" with Michael Jackson in 1983, cracking the top 5 on the charts in over five European territories except his homeland and selling over 250,000 copies in Germany alone.

In the United Kingdom, the album itself debuted at number 5 and quickly fell off the chart, spending only six weeks inside the top 100. In the United States, it peaked at the number 17 on the Billboard 200 with the first-week sales of only 53,000 copies, managing to receive Gold by the Recording Industry Association of America (RIAA). Although it met with mixed reviews from critics and suffered from lackluster sales in the UK and North America, the album fared better in other key markets such as Spain. In Japan, it surpassed its predecessor Flowers in the Dirt in cumulative sales. In Germany, Off the Ground has been McCartney's best-selling album, spending 20 weeks on the top-ten and eventually achieving Platinum for shipments of over half a million copies.

Some weeks after its release, McCartney launched the New World Tour, playing many shows across the world during the summer months. These concerts were documented on the album Paul Is Live, which followed at the end of 1993.

== Track listing ==
All tracks are written by Paul McCartney, except "Mistress and Maid" and "The Lovers That Never Were" by McCartney and Declan MacManus.

Off the Ground track listing
| No. | Title | Length |
|---|---|---|
| 1. | "Off the Ground" | 3:40 |
| 2. | "Looking for Changes" | 2:45 |
| 3. | "Hope of Deliverance" | 3:21 |
| 4. | "Mistress and Maid" | 2:58 |
| 5. | "I Owe It All to You" | 4:51 |
| 6. | "Biker Like an Icon" | 3:26 |
| 7. | "Peace in the Neighbourhood" | 5:06 |
| 8. | "Golden Earth Girl" | 3:44 |
| 9. | "The Lovers That Never Were" | 3:42 |
| 10. | "Get Out of My Way" | 3:31 |
| 11. | "Winedark Open Sea" | 5:26 |
| 12. | "C'Mon People" "Cosmically Conscious" (excerpt) | 7:42 |
| Total length: | | 50:12 |

Note: Initial Japanese pressings of the album included a bonus single containing "Long Leather Coat" and "Kicked Around No More".

== Off the Ground: The Complete Works ==
Off the Ground: The Complete Works

Studio album (reissue) by Paul McCartney
- Released: 1 December 1993
- Recorded: 25 January 1991, December 1991 – July 1992
- Studio: Hogg Hill Mill (Icklesham, UK); Hit Factory (London); Limehouse Studios (Wembley)
- Genre: Rock
- Length: 99:25
- Label: Parlophone; MPL
- Producer: Paul McCartney; Julian Mendelsohn

Off the Ground: The Complete Works is a two-disc set released in Germany, the Netherlands, and Japan. The first disc contains the original Off the Ground album, with the second collecting various B-sides and two previously unreleased tracks from his 1991 MTV Unplugged concert, "Things We Said Today" and "Midnight Special", which were later released as B-sides to the single "Biker Like an Icon".

Despite the title, the set is missing two B-sides, three promo remixes, one promo B-side, and one international single mix:

- "Deliverance" and "Deliverance (Dub Mix)", dance-oriented reworkings by Steve Anderson of the song "Hope of Deliverance", released as B-sides of the "C'mon People" CD single No. 1.
- The three promo remixes of "Off the Ground" released to American radio, namely the Bob Clearmountain remix, the Keith Cohen remix, and the Keith Cohen AC remix.
- The MTV Unplugged outtake "Mean Woman Blues", which was a B-side of the "Biker Like An Icon" promo CD single.
- The single mix of "Off the Ground" contained on the EU and Japanese CD singles.

Off the Ground: The Complete Works has not been reissued and is now out of print and not legally for sale as a digital download.

=== Track listing ===
All tracks are written by Paul McCartney, except where noted.

Off the Ground: The Complete Works disc two
| No. | Title | Writer(s) | B-side of | Length |
|---|---|---|---|---|
| 1. | "Long Leather Coat" | McCartney; Linda McCartney | "Hope of Deliverance" | 3:34 |
| 2. | "Keep Coming Back to Love" | McCartney; Hamish Stuart | "C'Mon People" | 4:59 |
| 3. | "Sweet Sweet Memories" | | "Off the Ground" | 4:03 |
| 4. | "Things We Said Today" | Lennon–McCartney | "Biker Like an Icon" | 3:44 |
| 5. | "Midnight Special" | traditional, arranged by McCartney | "Biker Like an Icon" | 4:55 |
| 6. | "Style Style" | | "Off the Ground" | 6:00 |
| 7. | "I Can't Imagine" | | "C'Mon People" | 4:36 |
| 8. | "Cosmically Conscious" | | "Off the Ground" | 4:40 |
| 9. | "Kicked Around No More" | | "Hope of Deliverance" | 5:23 |
| 10. | "Big Boys Bickering" | | "Hope of Deliverance" | 3:20 |
| 11. | "Down to the River" | | "C'Mon People" | 3:31 |
| 12. | "Soggy Noodle" | | "Off the Ground" | 0:28 |
| Total length: | | | | 49:13 |

== Personnel ==
- Paul McCartney – vocals, bass guitar, piano, mellotron, celesta, Wurlitzer electric piano, electric guitars, acoustic guitars, Spanish guitar, ocarina, percussion, sitar, drums
- Linda McCartney – vocals, autoharp, celesta, harmonium, minimoog, keyboards, percussion, whistle
- Hamish Stuart – vocals, electric guitar, acoustic guitar, 12 string guitar, bass guitar, percussion, piano
- Robbie McIntosh – electric guitars, acoustic guitars, Spanish guitar, slide guitar, mandolin, backing vocals
- Paul Wickens – keyboards, piano, hammond organ, clavinet, synthesizer, accordion, LinnDrum, drum programming, percussion, backing vocals
- Blair Cunningham – drums, congas, percussion, backing vocals

== Charts ==
=== Weekly charts ===
Weekly chart performance for Off the Ground
| Chart (1993) | Peak position |
|---|---|
| Australian ARIA Albums Chart | 8 |
| Austrian Albums Chart | 4 |
| Canadian RPM Albums Chart | 22 |
| Dutch Mega Albums Chart | 5 |
| European Albums Chart | 2 |
| German Media Control Albums Chart | 2 |
| Hungarian Albums Chart | 21 |
| Japanese Oricon Weekly Albums Chart | 5 |
| New Zealand Albums Chart | 4 |
| Norwegian Albums Chart | 2 |
| Spanish Albums Chart | 3 |
| Swedish Albums Chart | 10 |
| Swiss Albums Chart | 5 |
| UK Albums Chart | 5 |
| US Billboard 200 | 17 |

=== Year-end charts ===
Year-end chart performance for Off the Ground
| Chart (1993) | Position |
|---|---|
| Austrian Albums Chart | 23 |
| Japanese Albums Chart | 192 |
| Spanish Albums Chart | 21 |

== Certifications and sales ==
Certifications and sales for Off the Ground
| Region | Certification | Certified units/sales |
|---|---|---|
| Australia (ARIA) | Gold | 35,000^{^} |
| Austria (IFPI Austria) | Gold | 25,000^{*} |
| Canada (Music Canada) | Gold | 50,000^{^} |
| France (SNEP) | Gold | 100,000^{*} |
| Germany (BVMI) | Platinum | 500,000^{^} |
| Japan (RIAJ) | Gold | 92,000 |
| Spain (Promusicae) | Platinum | 100,000^{^} |
| Switzerland (IFPI Switzerland) | Gold | 25,000^{^} |
| United Kingdom (BPI) | Silver | 60,000^{^} |
| United States (RIAA) | Gold | 500,000^{^} |
^{*} Sales figures based on certification alone.^{^} Shipments figures based on certification alone.
