= Hope of Deliverance =

1992 single by Paul McCartney

Single by Paul McCartney

from the album Off the Ground
- B-side: "Long Leather Coat"; "Big Boys Bickering"; "Kicked Around No More"
- Released: 29 December 1992
- Recorded: 17 July 1992
- Studio: Hogg Hill Mill (Icklesham, UK)
- Genre: Rock; Latin
- Length: 3:22
- Label: Parlophone
- Songwriter: Paul McCartney
- Producers: Paul McCartney; Julian Mendelsohn

Paul McCartney singles chronology
"Save the Child" (1991)	"Hope of Deliverance" (1992)	"C'Mon People" (1993)

Music video
- "Hope of Deliverance" on YouTube

"Hope of Deliverance" is a song by English singer-songwriter Paul McCartney, released in December 1992 by Parlophone as the lead single from his ninth solo studio album, Off the Ground (1993). The rock and Latin song was written by McCartney and produced by him with Julian Mendelsohn. It reached number 18 on the UK Singles Chart and became a top-five hit in Austria, Canada, Germany, Italy, Norway, and Switzerland. The accompanying music video was directed by Andy Morahan. The song was recorded during sessions for Off the Ground, which took place on 17 July 1992. The overdub session is described in detail by Italian percussionist Maurizio Ravalico in the book Paul McCartney: Recording Sessions (1969–2013).

== Critical reception ==
J.D. Considine from The Baltimore Sun complimented the "lilting, Latin cadences" of "Hope of Deliverance". Larry Flick from Billboard magazine remarked that McCartney "continues to embrace warm and positive visions on this first glimpse into his upcoming Off the Ground collection." He explained, "A soft, acoustic-anchored arrangement clips along at a breezy pace. Spanish cultural influences and handclappin' rhythms gives the track a unique and refreshing vibe that will please programmers at pop, AC, and album-rock levels. Like a visit from a dear old friend." Randy Clark from Cash Box felt the single "is certainly not representative of the more brilliant musical work Paul has done over his 30-plus year career, although it's refreshing that he continues to enjoy the process." He added, "The intended inspiration of this track offers no solutions to "...the darkness that surrounds us", but it could be comforting for some to know Mr. Happy McMoneybags can still write a positive little pop song about anything."

A reviewer from Evening Herald noted the "uplifting pop panache" of the song. Irish Independent declared it as "simple, efficient pop". Liverpool Echo stated that it "sees Paul entering 1993 with optimism", adding further, "The single that grows and grows like most McCartney songs. It highlights his, optimistic side and his acoustic gift. It has flashbacks of the hit single 'Goodnight Tonight'." In his weekly UK chart commentary, James Masterton described it as "a gentle acoustic ballad". Alan Jones from Music Week wrote, "A jangly guitar intro ushers in a double-tracked Macca on a quirky but ultimately undistinguished and rather corny track, with an insipid middle eight. McCartney last breached the Top 10 in 1987 and this, sadly, isn't the song to end his drought." Parker Puterbaugh from Rolling Stone said it is "one of those perfect little tunes McCartney plucks from his songwriter's subconscious like a pearl from a shell. Deceptively wispy, effortlessly catchy, it finds McCartney breezily proffering a positive attitude toward the days ahead".

== Chart performance ==
"Hope of Deliverance" became a hit in McCartney's native UK, reaching number 18 on the UK Singles Chart. It did not fare well on the US Billboard Hot 100, peaking at number 83, but it did better on the Billboard Adult Contemporary chart, reaching number nine, and in Canada, where it reached number five. It also did very well in Germany, peaking at number three. Remix versions were released on 15 January 1993, and picked up massive airplay in clubs.

== Music video ==
The official music video for the song was directed by British director Andy Morahan. It received heavy rotation on MTV Europe in March 1993.

== Live performances ==
The song was featured in the set list of 1993's The New World Tour. It was in hiatus until McCartney performed it again in Bogotá, Colombia on 19 April 2012 during his On the Run Tour—the first time performing a song from Off the Ground with his 2012 lineup. During the Out There Tour, McCartney performed "Hope of Deliverance" with all musicians in his band playing guitar, including the tour opener in Belo Horizonte.

== Steve Anderson remix ==
"Hope of Deliverance" was remixed by Steve Anderson under the title "Deliverance" and released as a 12-inch single. Remixes were also released as b-sides to "C'Mon People" CD single. The music video directed by Richard Helsop was also released.

== Track listings ==
- 7-inch single
1. "Hope of Deliverance" – 3:20
2. "Long Leather Coat" (P. McCartney/L. McCartney) – 3:33
- CD maxi
1. "Hope of Deliverance" – 3:20
2. "Big Boys Bickering" – 3:19
3. "Long Leather Coat" (P. McCartney/L. McCartney) – 3:33
4. "Kicked Around No More" – 5:25
- Audio cassette
1. "Hope of Deliverance" – 3:20
2. "Long Leather Coat" (P. McCartney/L. McCartney) – 3:33
- 12-inch
1. "Deliverance"
2. "Deliverance" (Dub Mix)
3. "Hope of Deliverance"

== Personnel ==
- Paul McCartney – bass, guitars, vocals
- Linda McCartney – autoharp, backing vocals
- Hamish Stuart – backing vocals
- Robbie McIntosh – guitars
- Paul "Wix" Wickens – piano, LinnDrum, drum programming, percussion, backing vocals
- Blair Cunningham – drums, percussion, backing vocals
- Davide Giovannini – percussion
- Dave Pattman – percussion
- Maurizio Ravalico – percussion

== Charts ==
=== Weekly charts ===
Chart (1993)	Peak position
Australia (ARIA)	29
Austria (Ö3 Austria Top 40)	4
Belgium (Ultratop 50 Flanders)	7
Canada Top Singles (RPM)	5
Canada Adult Contemporary (RPM)	8
Denmark (IFPI)	6
Europe (Eurochart Hot 100)	8
Europe (European Hit Radio)	2
France (SNEP)	13
Germany (GfK)	3
Iceland (Íslenski Listinn Topp 40)	7
Ireland (IRMA)	28
Italy (Musica e dischi)	2
Japan (Oricon)	88
Netherlands (Dutch Top 40)	8
Netherlands (Single Top 100)	9
New Zealand (Recorded Music NZ)	20
Norway (VG-lista)	4
Panama (UPI)	4
Sweden (Sverigetopplistan)	26
Switzerland (Schweizer Hitparade)	5
UK Singles (Official Charts)	18
UK Airplay (Music Week)	11
UK Club Chart (Music Week)	13
US Billboard Hot 100	83
US Adult Contemporary (Billboard)	9
US Cash Box Top 100	87

=== Year-end charts ===
Chart (1993)	Position
Belgium (Ultratop)	70
Canada Top Singles (RPM)	50
Canada Adult Contemporary (RPM)	76
Europe (Eurochart Hot 100)	32
Europe (European Hit Radio)	14
Germany (Media Control)	22
Iceland (Íslenski Listinn Topp 40)	60
Netherlands (Dutch Top 40)	70
Netherlands (Single Top 100)	71
Switzerland (Schweizer Hitparade)	10

== Certifications ==
Region	Certification	Certified units/sales
Germany (BVMI)	Gold	250,000^{^}
^{^} Shipments figures based on certification alone.

== Release history ==
Region	Date	Format(s)	Label(s)	Ref(s).
United Kingdom	29 December 1992	7-inch vinyl; CD; cassette	Parlophone	
Australia	18 January 1993	CD; cassette	Parlophone; EMI	
Japan	27 January 1993	Mini-CD	Odeon	
