= Magical Mystery Tour (song) =

- Sheet music cover

Song by the Beatles

from the EP and album Magical Mystery Tour
- Released: 27 November 1967 (US LP); 8 December 1967 (UK EP)
- Recorded: 25 April – 3 May and 7 November 1967
- Studio: EMI, London
- Genre: Psychedelic rock; psychedelic pop
- Length: 2:51
- Label: Parlophone (UK), Capitol (US)
- Songwriter: Lennon–McCartney
- Producer: George Martin

Audio sample
- file; help

"Magical Mystery Tour" is a song by the English rock band the Beatles and the title track to the December 1967 television film of the same name. It was released on the band's Magical Mystery Tour soundtrack record, which was a double EP in Britain and most markets but an album in America, where Capitol Records supplemented the new songs with tracks issued on the Beatles' 1967 singles. The song was written primarily by Paul McCartney and credited to the Lennon–McCartney partnership.

The Beatles recorded the track in April and May 1967, soon after completing work on their album Sgt. Pepper's Lonely Hearts Club Band, and several months before committing to make the Magical Mystery Tour film. The song serves as an introduction to the audience, in the style of McCartney's opening title track to Sgt. Pepper, and includes ringmaster calls, a trumpet fanfare and traffic sounds.

== Composition ==
"Magical Mystery Tour" is credited to Lennon–McCartney, although written primarily by Paul McCartney. McCartney said it was co-written by the pair. John Lennon said, "Paul's song. Maybe I did part of it, but it was his concept." In 1972, Lennon said, "Paul [wrote it]. I helped with some of the lyric." According to Hunter Davies' contemporary account of the recording sessions for the song, McCartney arrived with the chord structure but only the opening refrain ("Roll up / Roll up for the mystery tour"). McCartney asked Mal Evans, the Beatles' assistant and former road manager, to search local bus stations for posters with text that could be adapted for the song, in the manner of Lennon's "Being for the Benefit of Mr. Kite!" When Evans was unsuccessful, a brainstorming discussion took place in the studio the following day to complete the lyrics.

The lyrics explain in a general way the premise of the film: a charabanc mystery tour of the type that was popular in Britain when the Beatles were young. McCartney said that he and Lennon expanded the tour to make it magical, which allowed it to be "a little more surreal than the real ones", and that the song was "very much in our fairground period". There are also interpretations of the lyric as an explicit reference to drugs, since the Beatles were experimenting with acid in those years. McCartney himself said about the song:

Because those were psychedelic times it had to become a magical mystery tour, a little bit more surreal than the real ones to give us a licence to do it. But it employs all the circus and fairground barkers, "Roll up! Roll up!", which was also a reference to rolling up a joint. We were always sticking those little things in that we knew our friends would get; veiled references to drugs and to trips. "Magical Mystery Tour is waiting to take you away," so that's a kind of drug, "it's dying to take you away" so that's a Tibetan Book of the Dead reference ... Magical Mystery Tour was the equivalent of a drug trip and we made the film based on that.

== Recording ==
The first session for "Magical Mystery Tour" took place at EMI Studios in London on 25 April 1967, less than a week after the final sessions for Sgt. Pepper's Lonely Hearts Club Band. Since the song was not complete, much of the time was spent rehearsing before the group attempted a recording. Three takes were required to achieve a basic track, with a line-up comprising McCartney on piano, Lennon on acoustic guitar, George Harrison on lead guitar, and Ringo Starr on drums. During reduction mixing of this performance, flanging effect was added to Harrison's guitar part and to the piano over the song's coda. On 26 April, McCartney overdubbed his bass guitar part and the four band members, together with Evans and Neil Aspinall, added percussion such as maracas, tambourine, cowbell and extra drums; Lennon, McCartney and Harrison then taped heavily echoed, vocalised shouts. The following night, McCartney added his lead vocal while Lennon and Harrison sang backing vocals, including the "Roll up / Roll up for the mystery tour" lines. The backing vocals were recorded at a far slower speed so that the voices sounded higher when the tape speed was corrected.

On 3 May, a brass fanfare and other trumpet parts were added in a disorganised session where the four trumpet players, including David Mason and Elgar Howarth, began the evening without a score. According to Philip Jones, a friend of the session players, they became so impatient at the lack of activity that Howarth wrote out the score himself. A glockenspiel part was also overdubbed over the coda.

In author Ian MacDonald's description, the slow progress on the recording was indicative of the Beatles' drug intake during this period and, in the case of Lennon and Harrison, their disinterest in McCartney's film project at the time. The band committed to making Magical Mystery Tour in early September, after the death of their manager, Brian Epstein. The sessions for the soundtrack music ended on 7 November, when McCartney recorded a new barker-style introduction for "Magical Mystery Tour" and traffic sounds were added. The tape loop of traffic sounds was taken from a recording made on a bridge overlooking the M1 motorway and mixed to pan across the stereo image. (Note: The traffic noises were recorded in stereo by an EMI engineer. He recalled capturing the sounds on a Sunday, when the light traffic flow allowed him to record vehicles individually.) The spoken introduction replaced an effort by Lennon, which was nevertheless retained in the version heard in the film. The latter version, which includes Lennon promising "the trip of a lifetime", in the middle of the track, also had additional applause and different bus sounds. (Note: Another comment exclusive to the film mix is Lennon urging, "Hurry, hurry, hurry" over the intro. In the instrumental break, following what music critic Richie Unterberger terms his "frankly sardonic" spiel containing the "trip of a lifetime" comment, Lennon utters in a heavily echoed voice: "The incredible Magical Mystery Tour!")

Although he did not participate in the song, The Moody Blues member Mike Pinder recalls being in the studio, just a few feet away from the microphone, during the recording of the vocal intro ("Roll up! Roll up!").

== Release ==
"Magical Mystery Tour" was released as the title track to a six-song double EP in the United Kingdom on 8 December 1967. It was the first example of a double EP in Britain. The format was chosen over a single-disc EP playing at 33⅓ rpm because the Beatles were unwilling to accept the loss of audio fidelity inherent in the latter option. In the United States, the double EP was stretched to an LP by adding five songs previously released as singles. Although Billboard magazine announced that the US release was to take place in mid December, the album was issued on 27 November.

The song plays over the opening scene in the Magical Mystery Tour film, which was broadcast on BBC1 in the UK on 26 December, and as a reprise at the end. (Note: Lasting just 1:10, the reprise includes a spoken farewell from Lennon.) Although the television film was savaged by critics, earning the Beatles their first public and critical failure, the soundtrack record was highly successful. With regard to the unusual format, Nick Logan of the NME referred to it as "the Beatles' new six-track EP, mini-LP or extended single, whatever you like to call it!" In the UK, it peaked at number 2 on the singles chart compiled by Record Retailer (later adopted as the UK Singles Chart) while the band's "Hello, Goodbye" held the top position. The EP was number 1 on Melody Maker's singles chart, demoting "Hello, Goodbye" for a week. The song itself reached number two on Sweden's Tio i Topp chart.

"Magical Mystery Tour" later appeared on the Beatles' 1973 greatest hits compilation 1967–1970 and their 1982 themed compilation Reel Music. During the CD era, the LP version of Magical Mystery Tour was issued on CD in all markets.

== Charts ==
Weekly chart performance for "Magical Mystery Tour"
Chart (1967–1968)	Peak position
Italy (Musica e dischi)	27
Netherlands (Single Top 100)	2
Norway (VG-lista)	5
Switzerland (Schweizer Hitparade)	6
Sweden (Tio i Topp)	2
UK Singles (OCC)	2

== Critical reception ==
It you're ready, then climb aboard. "Magical Mystery Tour" sets us off and John and Paul sing about taking us away. There's a lot of rollicking "Sergeant Pepper"-type roll and swing about this one, with an almost Herb Alpert trumpet in the background and a piano break ... We fade out to tinkling bells and what sounds like the clatter of milk bottles.

— Nick Logan, NME, November 1967

In Melody Maker, Bob Dawbarn cited the sound quality of the EP as an example of why singles should be available in stereo in the UK, and he described "Magical Mystery Tour" as "a massive storming piece with Paul singing lead over a tom-tom beat. The effect is mainly of guitars and brass with piano taking over at the end." Hit Parader's reviewer said that the soundtrack showed the Beatles extending their supremacy over "80 scillion other groups" and displaying a self-discipline in their arrangements and production that was absent on the Rolling Stones' new album, Their Satanic Majesties Request. The writer concluded: "In the opening song, the Beatles announce that they will take us away on their Magical Mystery Tour and they do indeed. You must listen in stereo."

Having been one of the few critics to review Sgt. Pepper unfavourably, Richard Goldstein of The New York Times complained that the Beatles were once more relying on studio artifice at the expense of true rock values and were over-focused on motif. Pairing "Magical Mystery Tour" with "Your Mother Should Know", he wrote: "Both ... are motifs disguised as songs. Both declare their moods (in stock musical phrases) but neither succeeds in establishing them. Instead, these cuts are as tedious and stuffy as an after-dinner speech." Rex Reed of HiFi/Stereo Review wrote a scathing critique in which he derided the group's singing and writing on the album, saying that "gimmicks don't compensate for confused musical ideas", and "Magical Mystery Tour" was "no more than a Radio City Music Hall parody. Nothing different or clever here." Robert Christgau of Esquire described the title song as "disappointing" and "perfunctory", although he conceded that the Beatles' new music should be viewed in the context of the television film. Writing in The Village Voice in 1976, in his retrospective on albums released during 1967, Christgau dismissed "Magical Mystery Tour" as "the lame theme to their worst movie" and said that along with "The Fool on the Hill", which followed it on the US LP, it had led listeners to overlook the quality of the remaining soundtrack songs.

In his book Revolution in the Head, Ian MacDonald writes of the song: "While energetic, the result is manufactured, its thin invention undisguised by a distorted production tricked out with unconvincing time and tempo changes ... The main idea – 'Roll up', etc. – is shop-worn, while the contrasting section – 'The Magical Mystery Tour is coming', etc. – does little more than transpose the verse sequence of 'Lucy in the Sky with Diamonds'." Writing for Rough Guides, Chris Ingham describes it as "the bare bones of a song accompanied by faintly tired brassy parping". Musicologist Walter Everett states: "I agree with those who call 'Magical Mystery Tour' a warmed-over 'Sgt. Pepper'-type fanfare/invitation to what's to follow … The transcendent modulation is not accompanied by compelling enough lyrics or sufficient melodic interest … to rise to greatness."

Reviewing for Mojo in 2002, Charles Shaar Murray admired the song, saying that "[McCartney's] lead vocal at its richest and most 'blaring' meets Lennon's filtered, vinegary backing part in one of the most inspired juxtapositions of Britain's two most distinctive rock voices". He added: "The sheer enthusiasm and excitement with which the song welcomes an uncharted but benign future represents the same archetypal '60s vision which informed the original Star Trek: that there is a better world ahead, and that it's gonna be fun." Rob Sheffield of Rolling Stone cites the track as an example of how the 2009 remasters of the Beatles' CDs transformed their sound, particularly with regard to Starr's drums. In his description, "'Magical Mystery Tour' goes from a likeable psychedelic trifle to a heavy krautrock blow-out."

== Legacy ==
The song was featured in the 2023 film Indiana Jones and the Dial of Destiny, in which the title character is awoken by the song being loudly played by his neighbours. The song was also featured in the teaser trailer, among other promotional material, for the 2025 film A Minecraft Movie.

== Other versions ==
In 1976, the American band Ambrosia covered "Magical Mystery Tour" for All This and World War II, a film that set new recordings of 30 Lennon–McCartney compositions to newsreel footage from World War II. The song appears at the start of the film, accompanied by footage of German cavalry advancing into Poland in September 1939. Released as a single in the US, Ambrosia's version peaked at number 39 on the Billboard Hot 100. The song has also been covered by Cheap Trick, Jive Bunny and the Mastermixers, and Don Latarski. The band Chicago also covered the song, doing so alongside a call-in show on the Beatles Channel on Sirius XM.

McCartney performed "Magical Mystery Tour" throughout his 1993 New World Tour. A live version from the tour was included on his album Paul Is Live and in the accompanying concert film, directed by Aubrey Powell.

== Personnel ==
According to Mark Lewisohn and Walter Everett, except where noted:

The Beatles

- Paul McCartney – lead and backing vocals, piano, bass guitar, ringmaster's voice, percussion
- John Lennon – lead and backing vocals, acoustic guitar, percussion
- George Harrison – harmony vocal, lead guitar, percussion
- Ringo Starr – drums, percussion

Additional musicians

- Mal Evans – percussion
- Neil Aspinall – percussion
- David Mason – trumpet
- Elgar Howarth – trumpet
- Roy Copestake – trumpet
- John Wilbraham – trumpet

== Sources ==
- Castleman, Harry; Podrazik, Walter J. (1976). All Together Now: The First Complete Beatles Discography 1961–1975. New York, NY: Ballantine Books. ISBN 0-345-25680-8.
- Everett, Walter (1999). The Beatles as Musicians: Revolver through the Anthology Project. New York, NY: Oxford University Press. ISBN 0-19-512941-5.
- Frontani, Michael R. (2007). The Beatles: Image and the Media. Jackson, MS: University Press of Mississippi. ISBN 978-1-57806-966-8.
- Guesdon, Jean-Michel; Margotin, Philippe (2013). All the Songs: The Story Behind Every Beatles Release. New York, NY: Black Dog & Leventhal. ISBN 978-1-57912-952-1.
- Ingham, Chris (2006). The Rough Guide to the Beatles (2nd ed.). London: Rough Guides/Penguin. ISBN 978-1-84836-525-4.
- Larkin, Colin (2006). Encyclopedia of Popular Music. New York, NY: Oxford University Press. ISBN 0-19-531373-9.
- Lewisohn, Mark (2005) [1988]. The Complete Beatles Recording Sessions: The Official Story of the Abbey Road Years 1962–1970. London: Bounty Books. ISBN 978-0-7537-2545-0.
- MacDonald, Ian (1998). Revolution in the Head: The Beatles' Records and the Sixties (1st rev. ed.). London: Pimlico. ISBN 0-7126-6697-4.
- Miles, Barry (1997). Paul McCartney: Many Years from Now. New York, NY: Henry Holt and Company. ISBN 0-8050-5249-6.
- Neaverson, Bob (1997). The Beatles Movies. London: Cassell. ISBN 978-0-304337965. Archived from the original on 2 October 2009 – via beatlesmovies.co.uk (chapter: "Magical Mystery Tour Part 1 – Background and Production").
- Pollack, Alan (1992). "Notes on 'The Fool on the Hill'".
- Schaffner, Nicholas (1978). The Beatles Forever. New York, NY: McGraw-Hill. ISBN 0-07-055087-5.
- Unterberger, Richie (2006). The Unreleased Beatles: Music & Film. San Francisco, CA: Backbeat Books. ISBN 978-0-87930-892-6.
- Winn, John C. (2009). That Magic Feeling: The Beatles' Recorded Legacy, Volume Two, 1966–1970. New York, NY: Three Rivers Press. ISBN 978-0-307-45239-9.
- Womack, Kenneth (2014). The Beatles Encyclopedia: Everything Fab Four. Santa Barbara, CA: ABC-CLIO. ISBN 978-0-313-39171-2.
