= Andy Panayi =

British musician

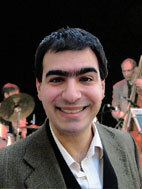
Panayi in 2006

Andy Panayi is a British jazz musician, composer and arranger. He plays flute, saxophones and clarinet and leads a selection of jazz and classical groups.

== British Jazz Scene ==
Born in Islington in north London and interested in music from an early age, Andy studied at the Trinity College of Music before embarking on a professional music career.

Andy is a leading member of the British jazz scene having performed and recorded with a selection of artists including Shirley Bassey, Paul McCartney, Salena Jones and Helen Shapiro.

He's also worked alongside or supported many other leading musicians and groups including The Moscow City Ballet, Ronnie Scott & his Side-men, BBC Big Band, John Dankworth and Cleo Laine, Humphrey Lyttelton, Suzi Quatro, and others.

He now works with the Associated Board of the Royal Schools of Music (ABRSM) as a consultant specialising in developing the Jazz syllabus for future examinations.

== Awards ==
Panayi has won several awards during his career including; The Marty Paich Arranging Award, The John Dankworth Soloist Award, The Worshipful Company of Musicians Jazz Medal, British Jazz Awards for Jazz Flute.

== Discography ==
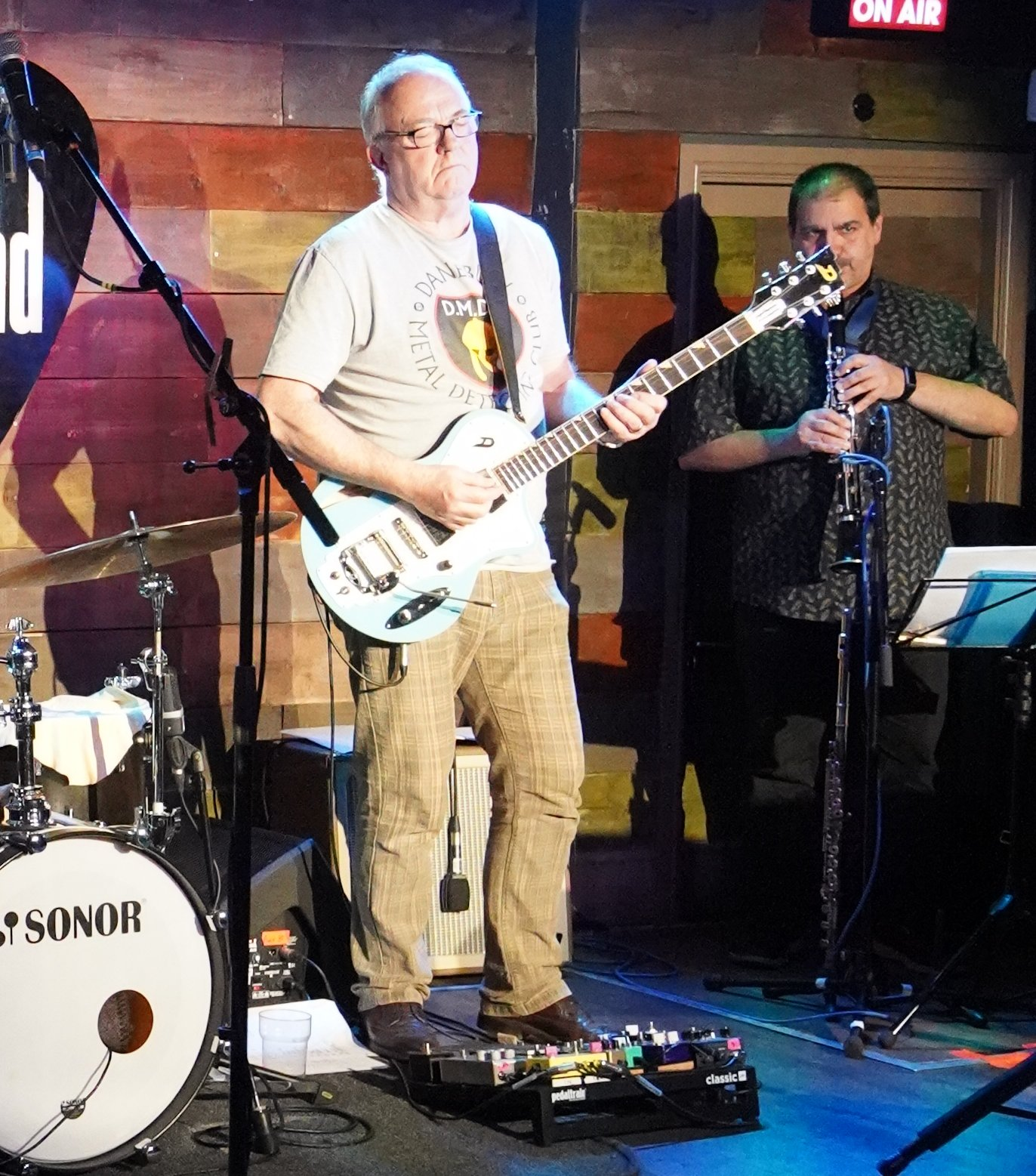
Panayi (right) and Robbie McIntosh performing with Held by Trees in 2023

- Annie Get Your Gun - 1986 London Cast - plays woodwinds in the album from the first London revival of Irving Berlin's musical Annie Get Your Gun, starring Suzi Quatro as Annie Oakley and Eric Flynn as Frank Butler
- "News from Blueport" - The Andy Panayi Quartet plays a tribute to Gerry Mulligan
- "Uschi's House" - Flux (Latin Jazz/House music CD) playing flutes & saxes
- "Blown Away" -The Andy Panayi Quartet - on Ronnie Scott's Jazz House A top 10 album of the year in the Jazz Journal of 2001
- "Whooeeee" - The Andy Panayi Quartet - on Mainstem Records featured as CD OF THE WEEK in The Observer.
- "Time Displaced" - The Andy Panayi Jazz Flute - on Mainstem Records featured as CD OF THE WEEK in The Observer.
