= Mistress and Maid (song) =

Song by Paul McCartney

from the album Off the Ground
- Released: 1 February 1993
- Length: 2:58
- Label: Parlophone; Capitol
- Songwriters: Paul McCartney; Declan MacManus
- Producers: Paul McCartney; Julian Mendelsohn

"Mistress and Maid" is a song by English musician Paul McCartney, released on his ninth solo studio album Off the Ground (1993). The song was co-written by McCartney and Elvis Costello (real name Declan MacManus) and produced by McCartney with Julian Mendelsohn.

== Composition ==
Described by American Songwriter editor Jim Beviglia as a "piercing character sketch", "Mistress and Maid" concerns a woman who has been "unofficially but essentially demoted" by an "uncaring husband". Nick DeRiso of Ultimate Classic Rock describes the song as "a cutting attack on male chauvanism." The first song to be written by McCartney and Costello, it was inspired by McCartney bringing a postcard depicting the painting Mistress and Maid (c. 1667) by Johannes Vermeer to a writing session.

Musically, "Mistress and Maid" is a waltz with "Beatles-like" orchestral elements, and keyboard textures which DeRiso likens to the Beatles' "Being for the Benefit of Mr. Kite!" (1967). Beviglia identifies a "circus-like atmosphere" within the song due to the use of violins and a brass section.

== Reception ==
"Mistress and Maid" has received positive reviews from critics, commonly being picked as a highlight from its parent album. DeRiso considers the track to be the most underrated song from Off the Ground, stating it "pulls no punches", an element he credited to Costello's involvement. Beviglia named it the fifth best song from McCartney and Costello's songwriting partnership; while he laments the "busy" production, which he feels compromises the "simple, sad prettiness" of the melody, Beviglia still considers the track to be "songwriting excellence". Melissa Ruggeri of USA Today named it as the 40th-best song from McCartney's career, calling it a "gorgeous waltz" with "devastating" lyrics.
