= C'Mon People =

1993 single by Paul McCartney

"C'mon People"

Single by Paul McCartney

from the album Off the Ground
- B-side: "I Can't Imagine; "Keep Coming Back to Love"; "Down to the River"; "Deliverance"
- Released: 22 February 1993
- Recorded: December 1991 – July 1992
- Studio: Hog Hill Mill, Icklesham
- Length: 5:47
- Label: Parlophone
- Songwriter: Paul McCartney
- Producers: Paul McCartney; Julian Mendelsohn

Paul McCartney singles chronology
"Hope of Deliverance" (1992)	"C'mon People" (1993)	"Off the Ground" (1993)

"C'mon People" is a song by the English singer-songwriter Paul McCartney, released in February 1993, by Parlophone, as the second single from his ninth album, Off the Ground (1993). The song reached number 41 on the UK Singles Chart.

== Music video ==
The accompanying music video for "C'mon People" was directed by ex-10cc member Kevin Godley and shows McCartney at the piano singing the song while workmen speedily deconstruct it and re-build it around him. It was produced by Iain Brown/Geoff Foulkes for Medialab and released in February 1993. Described by Godley as a "cross between a Bing Crosby Christmas Special on acid and 'All You Need Is Love' on wheels", the video was shot over three days at Bray Studios in Windsor. A further week in a motion control studio incorporated difference mattes, a technique which created the illusion of a piano transforming from a shell into a complete Steinway.

== Track listings ==
All songs were written by Paul McCartney except "Keep Coming Back to Love", co-written by Hamish Stuart.

- 7-inch single
1. "C'mon People" – 5:45
2. "I Can't Imagine" – 4:30
- CD single
1. "C'mon People" – 5:45
2. "I Can't Imagine" – 4:30
3. "Keep Coming Back to Love" – 4:59
4. "Down to the River" – 3:30
- CD single
1. "C'mon People" – 5:45
2. "Deliverance" – 8:44
3. "Deliverance" (dub mix) – 7:41

== Personnel ==
Personnel are taken from The Paul McCartney Project.

- Paul McCartney – lead and backing vocals, piano, celeste, electric guitar, whistle
- Linda McCartney – backing vocals, moog synthesizer
- Robbie McIntosh – acoustic guitar, electric guitar
- Hamish Stuart – backing vocals, bass
- Paul Wickens – synthesizer, congas
- Blair Cunningham – drums, congas
- Violin – Donald Weekes, Galina Solodchin, Michael Rennie, David Ogden, Roger Garland, Roy Gillard, Pauline Lowbury, Irvina Arditti, Alan Brind, Benedict Cruft, Miranda Fulleylove, Rita Manning, Bernard Partridge, Jonathan Rees, Celia Sheen, Barry Wilde, Jeremy Williams, David Woodcock
- Viola – John Underwood, Ken Essex, Roger Chase, Andrew Parker, George Robertson, Graeme Scott
- Cello – Robert Bailey, Paul Kegg, Ben Kennard, Anthony Pleeth, Roger Smith, Jonathan Williams
- Bass – Paul Cullington, Chris Laurence
- Trumpet – Guy Barker, Derek Watkins
- Horn – Frank Lloyd, Nicholas Busch
- Oboe – Josephine Lively, Richard Morgan
- Flute – Martin Parry, Jane Pickles
- Harp – Skaila Kanga
- Percussion – Tristan Fry, Terence Emery

== Charts ==
Chart (1993)	Peak position
Australia (ARIA)	132
Canada Top Singles (RPM)	80
Europe (European Hit Radio)	33
Germany (Media Control)	41
Iceland (Íslenski Listinn Topp 40)	33
Netherlands (Dutch Top 40 Tipparade)	4
Netherlands (Single Top 100 Tipparade)	15
UK Singles (OCC)	41

== Release history ==
Region	Date	Format(s)	Label(s)	Ref.
United Kingdom	22 February 1993	7-inch vinyl; CD1; cassette	Parlophone	
United Kingdom	1 March 1993	CD2	Parlophone	
Japan	28 April 1993	Mini-CD	Odeon	
Australia	3 May 1993	CD; cassette	Parlophone; EMI	
