= Bosh (band) =

- Origin: Bournemouth, England
- Genres: Alternative rock, Christian rock
- Years active: 1996–2011
- Label: Risen Records
- Members: David Griffiths; Mike Griffiths; James Grant; Steve Coates; Grant Howard; Matt Gainsford
- Website: www.boshmusic.com

Bosh were an English Christian rock band based in Bournemouth, England. The band formed in 1996 around brothers David and Michael Griffiths. Bosh are noted as one of bands that started the Nth Degree Community and Risen Records in the early 2000s.

Bosh released four CDs on Risen Records, the EP VII in 2005, and the live album Middle of Somewhere in 2007. Sound the Alarms was released in 2008 produced by a team that included Steve Ennever and Paul Burton. The Gloaming Hour EP was released in 2009. They were also a regular feature in the Christian music scene in the UK, playing at Nth Fest, Creation Fest, Greenbelt festival, Grace Festivals, and the Big Church Day Out Festival. They also played outside the Christian music scene and opened for bands such as Frightened Rabbit.

The band's final line-up consisted of David Griffiths, Mike Griffiths, Steve Coates, James Grant, and touring keys player Dave Evans. Former keyboard player Grant Howard left the band in March 2010 to move to Kitchener, Ontario, Canada. He was followed in July 2010 by guitarist Matt Gainsford who left to continue studying in Wisconsin.

In 2011, the band decided to enter indefinite hiatus to pursue other projects. They played their last show on 2 September 2011 in Bournemouth. David Griffith's next project, Chaos Curb Collaboration, which included contributions from former members Mike, James, Grant, Dave Evans, was signed to Joining the Dots distribution in 2012. David Griffiths released a solo album in 2016 featuring contributions from former members Mike, Grant, James, and Dave Evans.

== Members ==
Final lineup

- David Griffiths (1996–2011)
- Mike Griffiths (1996–2011)
- James Grant (2003–2011)
- Steve Coates (2010–2011)

Touring members

- Dave Evans – keyboards (2010–2011)

Former members

- Grant Howard – keyboards (2004–2010)
- Matt Gainsford – guitar (2004–2010)
