= Salt of the Sound =

Christian music band

- Origin: London, England, UK
- Genres: Christian, Ambient
- Years active: 2013–present
- Label: Independent
- Members: Anita Tatlow; Ben Tatlow
- Website: saltofthesound.com

Salt of the Sound is a Christian music band composed of husband-and-wife duo Anita and Ben Tatlow and is currently based in Hong Kong. The band has released three albums and six EPs. Their sound has been described as "evocative", "atmospheric", and "reflective".

== Recordings ==
The duo's debut album Journeys was released in November 2013 and immediately found favour with eminent Christian music publications, including Cross Rhythms.

Their second collection of original music, Through The Mist, was released on September 16, 2014.

== Discography ==
=== Studio albums ===
- Journeys (2013)
- Echoes of Wonder (2015)
- Beyond Here (2018)
- Made Whole (2021)

=== EPs ===
- Through the Mist (2014)
- From the Steepest Slopes (2016)
- Waiting for the Dawn (2016)
- In Prayer (2017)
- Lent, Vol. 1 (2018)
- And on Earth, Peace (2019)
- Lent, Vol. 2 (2021)
- Hymns for Eventide (2021)

=== Compilations ===
- Meditations, Vol. 1 (2014)
- Meditations, Vol. 2 (2016)
- Meditations, Vol. 3 (2018)
- Meditations, Vol. 4 (2020)
