= Winter Mountain =

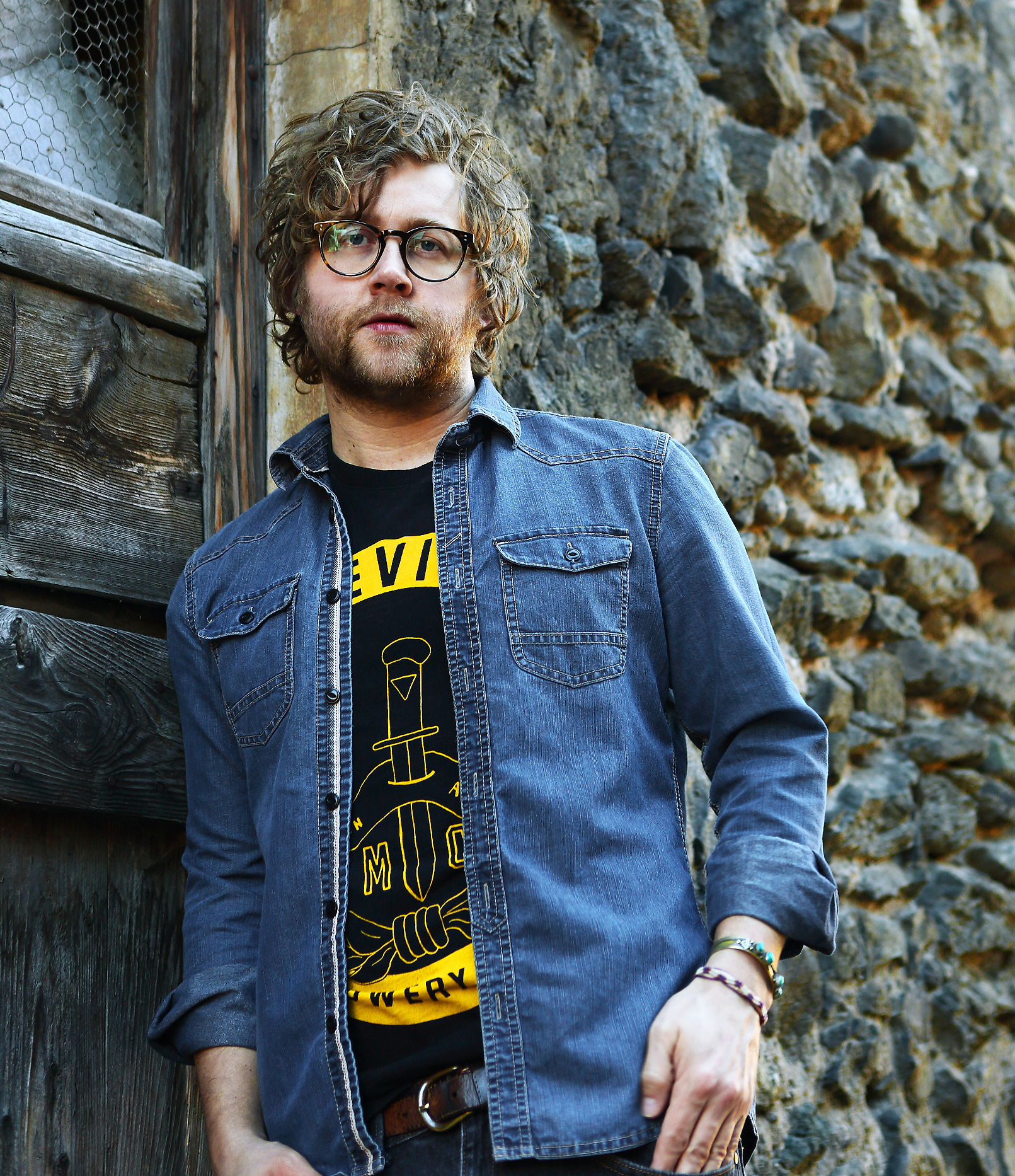
Winter Mountain in 2016

Joseph Francis, better known by the stage name Winter Mountain, is an English singer-songwriter, based in Cornwall. He is a multi-instrumentalist, playing guitar, bass, piano, and harmonica, whose music is predominantly indie folk/rock.

The Winter Mountain project began in 2009 as a duo of Francis and Irish songwriter Marty Smyth, releasing one album. Since 2016, Francis has used the name for his solo work, releasing a further album.

== Career ==
=== 2009–2015: As a duo ===
Winter Mountain began as a duo of Francis and Irish songwriter Marty Smyth, who met in 2009 while both were traveling by train to Memphis, Tennessee. After they performed and wrote together in Memphis, and later New York City, Francis visited Smyth at his home in Donegal, Ireland, and they shortly afterwards formed Winter Mountain. They began touring after winning a battle of the bands competition in Derry, Northern Ireland. Their prize was a two-day session at a local recording studio, which they used to record their five-track debut EP.

After a year of performing in pubs and folk clubs across the UK and Ireland, Winter Mountain were introduced by Northern Irish folk singer Cara Dillon to Dillon's husband and manager Sam Lakeman, and signed to Dillon and Lakemans's new label Charcoal Records in 2011. Their debut album Winter Mountain, produced by Lakeman and recorded at various studios in the UK, was released in 2013. Soon after the release Winter Mountain signed to Faber Music Publishing.

In 2015, after releasing one album together, Smyth left Winter Mountain, and Francis retained the name for his solo work.

=== 2016-present: As a solo artist ===
In summer 2016 Francis performed his first solo shows as Winter Mountain, opening for Seal, The Feeling, and Guy Garvey.

Winter Mountain released the self-produced I Swear I Flew on his Astral Fox Records label in November 2016. A song from the record, "The Lucky Ones", received radio play across the UK and Europe. The band went on a two-week tour of the UK in spring with a full band. Francis performed solo support sets for folk musician and occasional collaborator Seth Lakeman on his March 2017 UK tour. In June 2017, Francis toured as support for singer Ben Ottewell in Ireland and the UK.

== Discography ==
- Winter Mountain
- I Swear I Flew
