= Martin Ditcham =

English drummer, percussionist and songwriter

Martin Ditcham is an English drummer, percussionist and songwriter.

Ditcham is a prolific session musician, working with artists such as Henry Cow, Status Quo, Elton John, The Rolling Stones, Roger Daltrey, Sade, Mary Black, Nik Kershaw, Chris Rea, Tina Turner, Tom Robinson, Talk Talk, Everything but the Girl, Latin Quarter, Mark Knopfler, The Waterboys, Brian May and Held By Trees. He resides in Brazil, with his wife, Silvana.
