= Driving World Tour =

2002 concert tour by Paul McCartney

- Transcontinental tour by Paul McCartney
- Location: Asia • North America
- Associated album: Driving Rain
- Start date: April 1, 2002
- End date: November 18, 2002
- Legs: 4
- No. of shows: 58
- Box office: US $125.9 million ($225.36 in 2025 dollars)

Paul McCartney concert chronology
- The New World Tour (1993); Driving World Tour (2002); Back in the World Tour (2003)

The Driving World Tour was a concert tour by English musician Paul McCartney. It marked his first tour of the 21st century and of any kind since 1993's New World Tour. For the first time in nearly a decade, McCartney returned to the road following the death of first wife, Linda McCartney, the death of George Harrison, and 9/11. This was in promotion of his 2001 album Driving Rain. Paul "Wix" Wickens returned on keyboards and is credited as musical director. New to the fold were Americans Rusty Anderson, Brian Ray, and Abe Laboriel Jr. Paul McCartney's then-fiancée Heather Mills accompanied him on the tour and was in the audience for every American performance.

== Background ==
The tour began on April 1, 2002, when the American leg was kicked off in Oakland, California. The official release chronicling the first U.S. leg of the tour was the CD and DVD Back in the U.S., which itself would be promoted by another leg in the States. The second American leg was followed by visits to Mexico and Japan. A remix of The Fireman tracks and a performance by Cirque du Soleil opened each show.

== Personnel ==
- Paul McCartney – lead vocals, acoustic, electric and bass guitars, piano, ukulele
- Rusty Anderson – backing vocals, acoustic and electric guitars
- Brian Ray – backing vocals, acoustic, electric and bass guitars
- Paul "Wix" Wickens – backing vocals, keyboards, accordion, acoustic guitar
- Abe Laboriel, Jr. – backing vocals, drums, percussion

== Tour dates ==
List of 2002 concerts
| Date | City | Country | Venue | Attendance | Revenue |
|---|---|---|---|---|---|
| 1 April | Oakland | United States | The Arena in Oakland | 14,401 / 18,503 | $1,725,754 |
| 3 April | San Jose | United States | HP Pavilion | 14,330 / 18,113 | $1,672,915 |
| 5 April | Las Vegas | United States | MGM Grand Garden Arena | 23,341 / 24,712 | $5,591,700 |
| 6 April | Las Vegas | United States | MGM Grand Garden Arena | 23,341 / 24,712 | $5,591,700 |
| 10 April | Chicago | United States | United Center | 32,178 / 32,178 | $4,066,030 |
| 11 April | Chicago | United States | United Center | 32,178 / 32,178 | $4,066,030 |
| 13 April | Toronto | Canada | Air Canada Centre | 16,169 / 16,169 | $1,346,594 |
| 16 April | Philadelphia | United States | First Union Center | 15,536 / 15,536 | $1,868,760 |
| 17 April | East Rutherford | United States | Continental Airlines Arena | 16,740 / 16,740 | $1,961,431 |
| 19 April | Boston | United States | FleetCenter | 14,607 / 14,607 | $1,952,755 |
| 21 April | Uniondale | United States | Nassau Veterans Memorial Coliseum | 14,248 / 14,248 | $1,836,490 |
| 23 April | Washington, D.C. | United States | MCI Center | 29,946 / 29,946 | $3,810,367 |
| 24 April | Washington, D.C. | United States | MCI Center | 29,946 / 29,946 | $3,810,367 |
| 26 April | New York City | United States | Madison Square Garden | 31,402 / 31,402 | $4,050,500 |
| 27 April | New York City | United States | Madison Square Garden | 31,402 / 31,402 | $4,050,500 |
| 29 April | Cleveland | United States | Gund Arena | 17,564 / 17,564 | $2,146,615 |
| 1 May | Auburn Hills | United States | The Palace of Auburn Hills | 17,356 / 17,356 | $1,938,315 |
| 4 May | Los Angeles | United States | Staples Center | 15,805 / 15,805 | $2,148,387 |
| 5 May | Anaheim | United States | Arrowhead Pond of Anaheim | 13,739 / 13,739 | $1,780,035 |
| 7 May | Denver | United States | Pepsi Center | 14,700 / 14,700 | $1,762,935 |
| 9 May | Dallas | United States | Reunion Arena | 30,009 / 30,009 | $4,071,970 |
| 10 May | Dallas | United States | Reunion Arena | 30,009 / 30,009 | $4,071,970 |
| 12 May | Atlanta | United States | Philips Arena | 28,810 / 28,810 | $3,476,918 |
| 13 May | Atlanta | United States | Philips Arena | 28,810 / 28,810 | $3,476,918 |
| 15 May | Tampa | United States | Ice Palace | 16,128 / 16,128 | $1,979,845 |
| 17 May | Sunrise | United States | National Car Rental Center | 29,321 / 29,321 | $3,752,002 |
| 18 May | Sunrise | United States | National Car Rental Center | 29,321 / 29,321 | $3,752,002 |
| 21 September | Milwaukee | United States | Bradley Center | 16,584 / 17,082 | $1,985,585 |
| 23 September | St. Paul | United States | Xcel Energy Center | 15,797 / 15,797 | $2,183,430 |
| 24 September | Chicago | United States | United Center | 16,154 / 16,154 | $2,199,100 |
| 27 September | Hartford | United States | Hartford Civic Center | 13,638 / 13,638 | $1,920,240 |
| 28 September | Atlantic City | United States | Boardwalk Hall | 12,752 / 12,752 | $2,258,000 |
| 30 September | Boston | United States | FleetCenter | 29,097 / 29,097 | $4,050,530 |
| 1 October | Boston | United States | FleetCenter | 29,097 / 29,097 | $4,050,530 |
| 4 October | Cleveland | United States | Gund Arena | 15,752 / 17,500 | $2,014,460 |
| 5 October | Indianapolis | United States | Conseco Fieldhouse | 15,121 / 15,121 | $1,845,410 |
| 7 October | Raleigh | United States | RBC Center | 13,916 / 13,916 | $1,686,275 |
| 9 October | St. Louis | United States | Savvis Center | 14,878 / 14,878 | $1,791,485 |
| 10 October | Columbus | United States | Value City Arena | 15,124 / 15,124 | $2,132,005 |
| 12 October | New Orleans | United States | New Orleans Arena | 12,906 / 12,906 | $1,509,715 |
| 13 October | Houston | United States | Compaq Center | 12,440 / 12,440 | $1,758,235 |
| 15 October | Oklahoma City | United States | Ford Center | 14,847 / 14,847 | $1,956,090 |
| 18 October | Portland | United States | Rose Garden | 15,576 / 15,576 | $1,847,150 |
| 19 October | Tacoma | United States | Tacoma Dome | 17,648 / 17,648 | $2,325,855 |
| 21 October | Sacramento | United States | ARCO Arena | 13,737 / 13,737 | $1,714,148 |
| 22 October | San Jose | United States | HP Pavilion | 14,220 / 14,220 | $1,892,330 |
| 25 October | Anaheim | United States | Arrowhead Pond of Anaheim | 13,588 / 16,192 | $1,795,675 |
| 26 October | Las Vegas | United States | MGM Grand Garden Arena | 12,654 / 12,654 | $2,517,900 |
| 28 October | Los Angeles | United States | Staples Center | 15,866 / 16,143 | $2,194,319 |
| 29 October | Phoenix | United States | America West Arena | 14,878 / 15,125 | $1,967,187 |
| 2 November | Mexico City | Mexico | Palacio de los Deportes | 52,451 / 52,451 | $4,787,211 |
| 3 November | Mexico City | Mexico | Palacio de los Deportes | 52,451 / 52,451 | $4,787,211 |
| 5 November | Mexico City | Mexico | Palacio de los Deportes | 52,451 / 52,451 | $4,787,211 |
| 11 November | Tokyo | Japan | Tokyo Dome | 120,429 / 121,419 | $14,406,218 |
| 13 November | Tokyo | Japan | Tokyo Dome | 120,429 / 121,419 | $14,406,218 |
| 14 November | Tokyo | Japan | Tokyo Dome | 120,429 / 121,419 | $14,406,218 |
| 17 November | Osaka | Japan | Osaka Dome | 80,284 / 80,944 | $8,208,891 |
| 18 November | Osaka | Japan | Osaka Dome | 80,284 / 80,944 | $8,208,891 |
| Total | | | | 996,667 / 1,012,947 | $125,887,762 |

== See also ==
- List of highest-grossing concert tours
