= Robbie McIntosh =

English guitarist (born 1957)

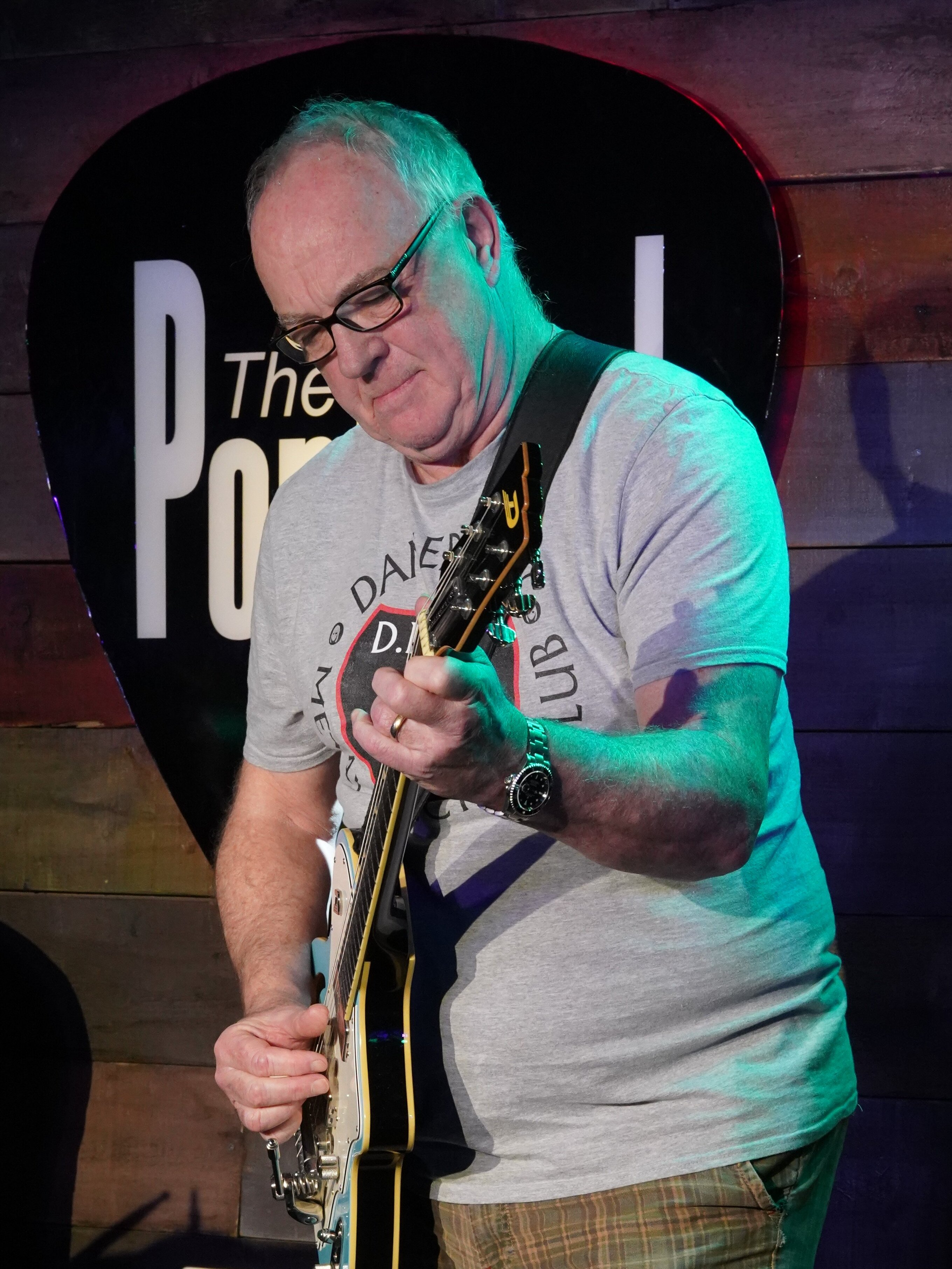
- McIntosh with Held By Trees in 2023

Background information
- Born: 25 October 1957 (age 68): Sutton, Surrey, England, United Kingdom
- Genres: Rock; blues
- Occupations: Musician; composer; guitarist
- Instruments: Guitar; bass guitar; vocals
- Years active: 1970s–present
- Member of: Held By Trees
- Formerly of: The Pretenders; 70% Proof; Roger Daltrey; Paul McCartney Band; John Mayer; The Foster Brothers; The Robbie McIntosh Band; Filthy McNasty; Daryl Hall; Jerry Harrison; Talk Talk; Norah Jones

Robbie McIntosh (born 25 October 1957) is an English guitarist. McIntosh is best known as a session guitarist and member of the Pretenders from 1982 until 1987. In 1988 he began doing session guitar work for Paul McCartney, joining his band full-time until early 1994. He continues to play sessions and has performed both with his own band and as a sideman with John Mayer.

McIntosh performed session guitar work for many artists throughout his career including Winter Mountain, Aynsley Lister, Kevin Ayers, Boyzone, Cher, Diane Tell, Eric Bibb, George Martin, Gordon Haskell, Heather Small, Joe Cocker, Daryl Hall, John Mayer, Kirsty McColl, Luz Casal, Mike and the Mechanics, Nine Below Zero, Paul Carrack, Paul Young, Mark Knopfler, John Illsley, Roger Daltrey, Russell Watson, Mark Hollis, Talk Talk, Tasmin Archer, Tears for Fears, Eros Ramazzotti, Thea Gilmore, Tina Arena, Tori Amos, Vin Garbutt, and Norah Jones.

== Early life and influences ==
McIntosh was born in Sutton, Surrey, and started playing the guitar at the age of ten, picking out things from any records listened to at the time. His father owned records by jazz artists such as Fats Waller, Django Reinhardt, and Louis Armstrong, and his mother played piano. His two older sisters introduced him to the Beatles, the Rolling Stones, the Kinks, the Spencer Davis Group, and Jimi Hendrix. At age 13, he started taking classical guitar lessons from a teacher called Michael Lewin, who later became a professor and head of the Guitar department at the Royal Academy of Music and passed his grade eight music exams.

== Career ==
=== 70% Proof and The Foster Brothers ===
McIntosh's first band was called 70% Proof. They played original material and also covers by others including Humble Pie, the Who, Free and Stevie Wonder. The other band members Paul Eager, Russell Ayles and Graham Mincher had all left school and he used to rehearse on Sunday afternoons with them at the local works canteen. McIntosh took A-levels at school but was not able to study biology at university as he had hoped. This lead him to join Raynes Park band the Foster Brothers. He toured and recorded with this band throughout 1977 before the band folded in 1978.

=== Filthy McNasty and Night ===
McIntosh worked for about six months as a lorry driver for a builder's supply company. Unexpectedly he received a phone call from Chris Thompson who at the time was the singer in Manfred Mann's Earth Band and had a casual band called Filthy McNasty who played the London Club Circuit and he employed McIntosh as lead guitarist. In November 1978 the band travelled to Los Angeles to record with Richard Perry for his Planet Record label. The name of the band was changed to Night. The band toured in America for most of 1979, supporting the Doobie Brothers.

=== Chris Thompson and the Islands and Dean Martin's Dog ===
Night disbanded during 1980 but Thompson and McIntosh stayed together and formed Chris Thompson and the Islands with Malcolm Foster, Paul "Wix" Wickens (who later joined McIntosh in Paul McCartney's band in 1989) and Mick Clews. He left at the end of 1981. McIntosh formed a jam band to play the local pub circuit called "Dean Martin's Dog" along with Malcolm Foster, Mick Clews, Jez Wire, Rupert Black and Mike Dudley. The band won Time Out magazine "band name of the year".

=== The Pretenders ===
During 1977 and 1978, McIntosh had become friends with James Honeyman-Scott of the Pretenders, who contacted McIntosh in 1982 with a view to his joining the Pretenders to fill out the band's live sound. Honeyman-Scott died in June 1982 and was replaced by Billy Bremner. During the Christmas period the same year, McIntosh joined the Pretenders. He toured extensively with the band and was also credited on the albums Learning to Crawl (1984) and Get Close (1986), before leaving in September 1987.

=== Roger Daltrey ===
In 1985, McIntosh became the main guitarist on Roger Daltrey's sixth solo album Under a Raging Moon, a tribute to the Who's former drummer Keith Moon who had died in 1978. The album was Daltrey's best charting success in the US and McIntosh was featured on the music video for "Let Me Down Easy" aside Daltrey opposite to Bryan Adams also playing guitar.

=== Jerry Harrison and Kevin McDermott Orchestra ===
He appeared on several Talking Heads Jerry Harrison's solo albums including the critically acclaimed Casual Gods album, which included the US Album Rock Tracks chart hit "Rev It Up", which reached number seven in early 1988. He was also credited on the first Kevin McDermott Orchestra album Mother Nature's Kitchen. Robbie still plays periodically with this band in Glasgow.

=== Paul McCartney ===
He left K.M.O. in 1988, taking on session work and became the lead guitarist for Paul McCartney's band, touring and playing on all McCartney's albums from 1989 to 1993. He can be seen in the concert films Get Back and Paul Is Live.

=== The Robbie McIntosh Band ===
After leaving McCartney's band, he realised his long-time ambition to have the time to form his own band and is quoted as saying: "I decided to pick some of my favourite players for a band that I thought would give a particular sound and edge to my songs. So I grabbed Paul Beavis, Pino Palladino, Mark Feltham and Melvin Duffy to form The Robbie McIntosh Band in 1998. We did some gigs and recorded Emotional Bends as a debut album." Earlier instrumentals became the basis of a second album Unsung inspired by Douglas Adams.

=== Norah Jones and John Mayer ===
In 2004 McIntosh joined Norah Jones's touring band staying in the band a year for the "Feels Like Home" world tour playing slide, acoustic and electric guitar, mandolin and backing vocals. He toured with John Mayer from 2006 to 2010 providing rhythm and lead guitar, dobro and mandolin. He performed all slide guitar parts during that period as well.

=== Winter Mountain, sessions and Turn Up for the Books ===
In 2012 McIntosh played acoustic and electric guitar on multiple songs from Winter Mountain's self-titled debut album, including the band's debut single "Shed a little light" on which he played slide guitar. McIntosh played live with Sinéad O'Connor, Tom Jones, Bluesclub and Los Pacaminos. He released his fifth album Turn Up for the Books in September 2013. This album has contributions by Paul Beavis, Stephen Darrell Smith, Mark Feltham, Pino Palladino, Steven Wilson, Jess Upton and Peter Hope-Evans.

=== Seaworld and Fortuneswell ===
In May 2017 he once again joined John Mayer on stage to perform the song "Daughters” in London. In June 2021 Robbie released another album of songs called Seaworld, featuring Stephen Darrell Smith on keyboards, Paul Beavis on drums, Steve Wilson on bass, Jody Linscott on percussion and Peter Hope Evans on harmonica. McIntosh and Smith shared production credits and his former McCartney bandmate Paul "Wix" Wickens mastered the album. In December 2021 he released the album Fortuneswell, solely as a download from Bandcamp. All profits from this went to the Fortuneswell Cancer Trust.

=== Held By Trees ===
During the first COVID-19 lockdown, McIntosh was invited by musician David Joseph to contribute to his Talk Talk inspired instrumental post-rock project called Held By Trees. The project, at that point, involved other Talk Talk associates, Martin Ditcham (drums, percussion), Lawrence Pendrous (piano), Andy Panayi (woodwinds) and Simon Edwards (bass). The group released their first album, Solace, in 2022. This was followed by live shows which featured bassist James Grant (replacing Edwards) and drummer Paul Beavis.

== Discography ==
Robbie McIntosh

- Unsung (Compass Records, 1999)
- Hush Hour (Flying Sparks, 2003)
- Turn up for the Books (Not On Label, 2013)
- Seaworld (Mighty Village, 2021)
- Fortuneswell (Not On Label, 2021)

With Tori Amos

- Scarlet's Walk (Epic Records, 2002)

With Tasmin Archer

- Great Expectations (Capitol Records, 1992)

With Bee Gees

- This Is Where I Came In (Polydor Records, 2001)

With BluesClub

- Rollin' and Tumblin' Vol. 1 (2011)

With Boyzone

- Where We Belong (Polydor Records, 1998)

With Paul Carrack

- Groove Approved (Chrysalis Records, 1989)
- Blue Views (I.R.S. Records, 1995)
- Old, New, Borrowed and Blue (Carrack, 2007)
- These Days (Carrack, 2018)
- One on One (Carrack, 2021)

With Joe Cocker

- No Ordinary World (Parlophone Records, 1999)

With Roger Daltrey

- Under a Raging Moon (10 Records, 1985)

With Jim Diamond

- Desire for Freedom (A&M Records, 1986)

With Céline Dion

- Let's Talk About Love (Columbia Records, 1997)

With Aretha Franklin

- With Everything I Feel in Me (Atlantic Records, 1974)

With Thea Gilmore

- Rules For Jokers (Flying Sparks Records, 2001)
- Songs From The Gutter (Hungry Doc Records, 2002)
- Avalanche (Flying Sparks Records, 2003)
- John Wesley Harding (Fullfill, 2011)
- Regardless (2013)
- Ghosts and Graffiti (2015)
- The Counterweight (2017)

With Josh Groban

- Awake (143 Records, 2006)

With Daryl Hall

- Three Hearts in the Happy Ending Machine (RCA Records, 1986)

With Colin Hay

- Looking for Jack (Columbia Records, 1987)

With Mark Hollis

- Mark Hollis (Polydor Records, 1998)

With John Illsley

- Testing the Water (Creek Touring, 2014)
- Long Shadows (Blue Barge, 2016)
- VII (100% Records, 2022)

With Duncan James

- Future Past (EMI, 2006)

With Howard Jones

- In the Running (EastWest, 1992)

With Norah Jones

- Not Too Late (Blue Note Records, 2007)

With Ronan Keating

- Time of My Life (Universal, 2016)

With Mark Knopfler

- Down the Road Wherever (EMI, 2018)

With Barry Manilow

- Barry Manilow (Arista Records, 1989)

With John Mayer

- Battle Studies (Columbia Records, 2009)

With Paul McCartney

- Flowers in the Dirt (Parlophone Records, 1989)
- Off the Ground (Parlophone Records, 1993)

With The Robbie McIntosh Band

- Emotional Bends (Vandeleur, 1999)
- Wide Screen (Compass Records, 2001)

With Willie Nile

- Places I Have Never Been (Columbia Records, 1991)

With Mark Owen

- In Your Own Time (Universal, 2003)

With The Pretenders

- Learning to Crawl (Real Records, 1984)
- Get Close (Real Records, 1986)
- Last of the Independents (WEA Records, 1994)

With Propaganda

- 1234 (Virgin Records, 1990)

With Jennifer Rush

- Credo (EMI, 1997)

With Ron Sexsmith

- Hangover Terrace (Cooking Vinyl, 2025)

With Michael W. Smith

- Live the Life (Reunion Records, 1998)

With Rod Stewart

- Human (Atlantic Records, 2001)

With Talk Talk

- It's My Life (EMI, 1984)
- The Colour of Spring (EMI, 1986)
- Spirit of Eden (Parlophone Records, 1988)

With Tears For Fears

- The Seeds of Love (Fontana Records, 1989) lead guitar (tracks 2, 7), slide guitar (track 2)

With Chris Thompson

- Out of the Night (Ultraphone, 1984)
- High Cost of Living (Atlantic Records, 1986)

With Russell Watson

- The Voice (Decca Records, 2000)

With Bill Wyman

- Back to Basics (Proper Records, 2015)
- Drive My Car (BMG, 2024)

With Paul Young

- Other Voices (Columbia Records, 1990)
- Paul Young (EastWest Records, 1997)
