= Blair Cunningham =

American drummer (born 1957)

- Born: October 11, 1957 (age 69); Memphis, Tennessee, U.S.
- Occupation: Drummer
- Instrument: Drums
- Years active: 1970s–present
- Member of: Haircut One Hundred
- Formerly of: The Pretenders, Sharks, Paul McCartney Band

Blair Cunningham (born October 11, 1957, Memphis, Tennessee) is an American drummer who has played for many bands and artists including Denise LaSalle, Robert Johnson, the Detroit Emeralds, Frederick Knight, Echo & the Bunnymen, Haircut One Hundred, John Foxx, the Pretenders, Paul McCartney, Alison Moyet, Sade, Paul Rutherford, Indigo Girls, Roxy Music, Tina Turner, Lionel Richie, Mick Jagger, Ray Davis, Andy Taylor, Marius Müller-Westernhagen, Kevin Rowland and the Big Dish. He played drums at a one-off gig by Sharks, and on "All Things Are Nice" and "My Baby" from Blancmange's album Mange Tout.

Blair is the son of Kelly Cunningham Sr. and Ernestine Cunningham. Blair is the youngest of 13 children, 10 boys and 3 girls. His oldest brother Kelly Cunningham Jr. taught all of the brothers to play drums and was his biggest influence. His brother Carl Cunningham was drummer with Stax group the Bar-Kays. Carl died in the same plane crash that killed Otis Redding in December 1967, when Blair was 10 years old.
