= I Me Mine =

- Cover of the original Hansen Publishing sheet music

Song by the Beatles

from the album Let It Be
- Released: 8 May 1970
- Recorded: 3 January and 1 April 1970
- Studio: EMI, London
- Genre: Rock; folk; blues
- Length: 2:26
- Label: Apple
- Songwriter: George Harrison
- Producer: Phil Spector

"I Me Mine" is a song by the English rock band the Beatles from their 1970 album Let It Be. Written by George Harrison, it was the last new track the group recorded before their break-up in April 1970. The song originated from their January 1969 rehearsals at Twickenham Film Studios when they were considering making a return to live performance. Written at a time of acrimony within the group, the lyrics lament humankind's propensity for self-centredness and serve as a comment on the discord that led to Harrison temporarily leaving the Beatles. The musical arrangement alternates between waltz-time verses and choruses played in the hard rock style.

The song reflects Harrison's absorption in Hindu texts such as the Bhagavad Gita and their denouncement of ego in favour of universal consciousness. When Harrison presented "I Me Mine" at Twickenham, John Lennon showed little interest and instead waltzed with Yoko Ono while the other Beatles rehearsed the song. Footage of the couple dancing was included in the Let It Be documentary film. In January 1970, by which point Lennon had privately left the group, the three remaining members formally recorded the song without his involvement at EMI Studios in London for the Let It Be album. When preparing the album for release, producer Phil Spector extended the track by repeating the chorus and second verse, in addition to adding orchestration and a female choir.

Among music critics, several writers have identified "I Me Mine" as a powerful final performance by the Beatles and an apt statement from Harrison. The song has been referenced by some religious scholars in their commentary on egoism. Harrison titled his 1980 autobiography I, Me, Mine after the track. The original recording, lasting just 1:34, appeared on the Beatles' 1996 outtakes compilation Anthology 3, introduced by a mock announcement from Harrison referring to Lennon's departure.

== Background and inspiration ==
I kept coming across the words I, me and mine in books about yoga and stuff ... [about the difference between] the real you and the you that people mistake their identity to be ... I, me and mine is all ego orientation. But it is something which is used all the time ... "No one's frightened of saying it, everyone's playing it, coming on strong all the time. All through your life, I me mine."

— George Harrison, 1997

George Harrison wrote "I Me Mine" on 7 January 1969, during the second week of the Beatles' filmed rehearsals at Twickenham Film Studios in west London. The film project – which became known as Get Back and eventually Let It Be – formed part of the Beatles' proposed return to live performance for the first time since 1966. Harrison recalled that after spending two months in the United States in late 1968, he was "quite optimistic" about the new project, but the situation within the group "was just the same as it had been when we were last in the studio ... There was a lot of trivia and games being played". For Harrison, the power struggle between John Lennon and Paul McCartney, and the constant presence of Lennon's girlfriend, avant-garde artist Yoko Ono, created an atmosphere that contrasted sharply with the creative freedom and camaraderie he had recently enjoyed with Bob Dylan and the Band in upstate New York.

The 7 January rehearsal was marked by acrimony, as the Beatles argued over the direction of the project. Hours were given over to rehearsing McCartney's "Maxwell's Silver Hammer" with little improvement, and McCartney confronted Lennon over his lack of new songs, drawing a sarcastic response from Lennon. (Note: Lennon had become addicted to heroin over the previous months and had written little since the Beatles completed their self-titled double album (also known as the "White Album") in October 1968. He later attributed his descent into addiction to the other Beatles' hostility towards Ono, Lennon's constant companion from the start of the White Album sessions.) Since the start of the project, Harrison had presented several new songs for consideration, only to see them given laborious treatment by the band or overlooked entirely. That day, he confronted his bandmates about their attitude to his songs; he later complained that due to their greater experience as songwriters, Lennon and McCartney viewed their own material as the priority and "I'd have to wait through ten of their songs before they'd even listen to one of mine". Harrison wrote the song at home that night, drawing inspiration from the divisive atmosphere in the band. The melody was inspired by either the incidental music on a BBC television programme he watched, Europa – The Titled and the Untitled, played by an Austrian brass band. or incidental music, composed by Tristram Cary for an episode of Out of the Unknown which aired prior to that programme on BBC2.

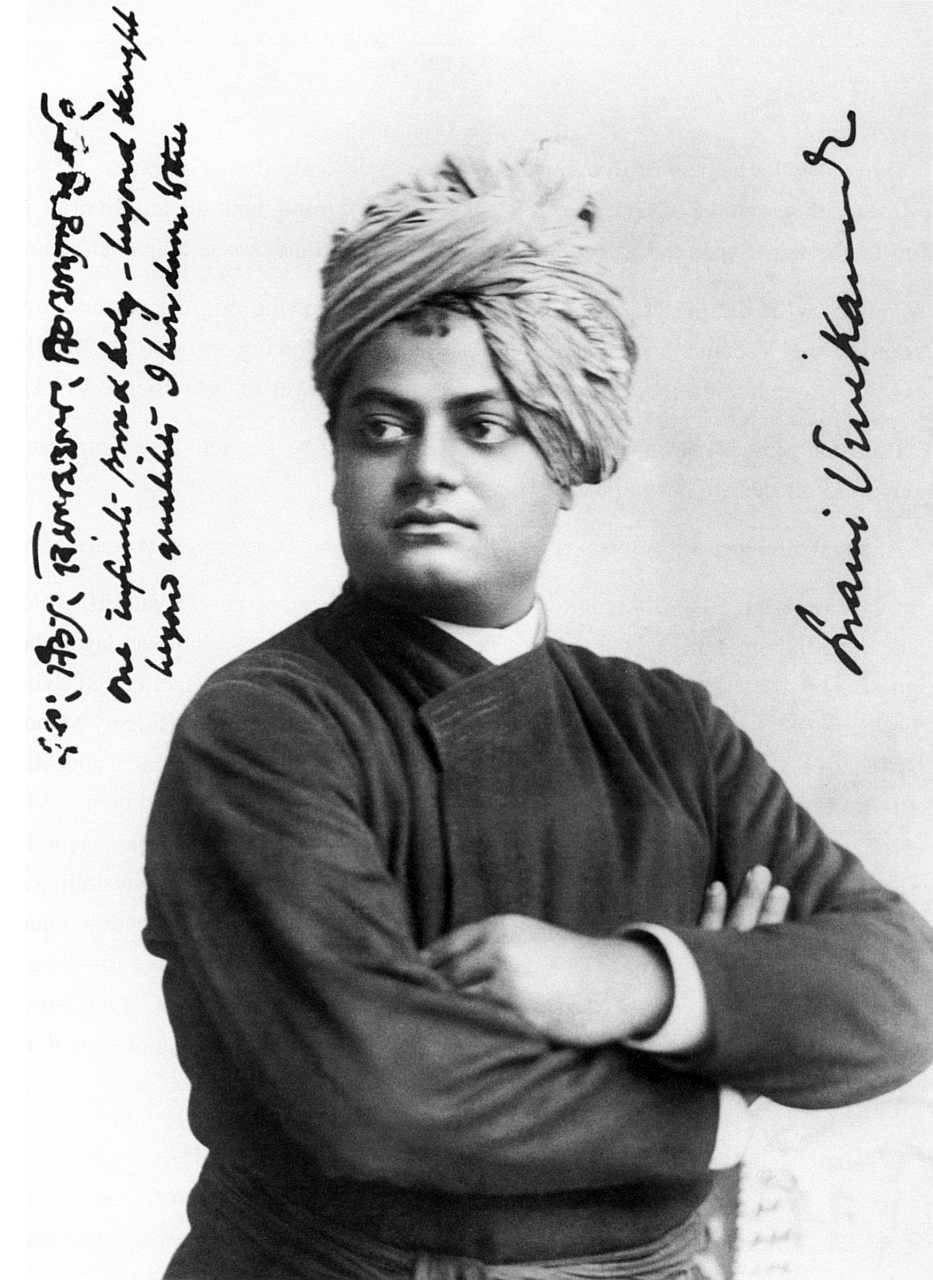
The song's message was partly inspired by the teachings of Hindu monk Swami Vivekananda.

When discussing "I Me Mine", Harrison said he was addressing the "eternal problem" of egoism and that his perspective was informed by his past experiences with the hallucinogenic drug LSD. He said the concept was in keeping with Swami Vivekananda's teaching that an individual's goal in life was to realise their divine qualities by transcending ego concerns, which Harrison called "the little 'i'", and seeing themselves as part of "the big 'I'; i.e. OM, the complete whole, universal consciousness that is devoid of duality and ego".

Author Jonathan Gould describes the song as a "commentary on the selfishness" of Lennon and McCartney, while musicologist Walter Everett says that after Harrison had written "Not Guilty" in 1968 as a "defense against the tyranny of his songwriting comrades", "I Me Mine" was his "mocking complaint about their stifling egos". In their study of the tapes from the Get Back project, authors Doug Sulpy and Ray Schweighardt write that Lennon and McCartney regularly overlooked Harrison's compositions, even when his songs were "far better than their own".

== Composition ==
The verses of "I Me Mine" are in the key of A minor while the chorus is in A major. This technique of parallel minor/major contrast is common in the Beatles' songwriting and had been employed by Harrison in his 1968 songs "While My Guitar Gently Weeps" and "Savoy Truffle". (Note: It also appears in Lennon–McCartney compositions such as "The Fool on the Hill", "Fixing a Hole", "Michelle", "Things We Said Today", "Do You Want to Know a Secret" and "Norwegian Wood (This Bird Has Flown)".) Everett likens the melody of the verses to the European folk music typified by Mary Hopkin's debut single for the Beatles' Apple record label, "Those Were the Days". He views this folk aspect as "well suited" to Harrison's use of the same "F-against-E7 sound" he first adopted in "I Want to Tell You". (Note: Author Simon Leng describes the melody as "gently undulating" in the style of "If I Needed Someone" and Harrison's recent collaboration with Dylan, "I'd Have You Anytime".) The composition originally included a flamenco-style instrumental passage but Harrison subsequently replaced this section with a chorus repeating the line "I me-me mine". In its final form, the structure comprises an intro, two combinations of verse and chorus, followed by a verse. The verse and chorus are also differentiated by their time signature: the former is in 3/4 time while the latter is in 4/4.

Musicologist Alan Pollack describes the song as "an interesting folk/blues stylistic hybrid with more than just a touch of the hard rocking waltz beat". The verse begins with two repeated phrases, each consisting of a shift from the i minor (Am) chord to a IV (D7), emphasising the Dorian mode, followed by ♭VII (G), V7 (E7) and i minor chords. The verse continues with a minor iv (Dm) chord for two bars before shifting to V7 (E7), after which a ♭9 (F natural) melody note results in what musicologist Dominic Pedler terms the "dark drama" of an E7♭9 chord and an example of the Beatles' employment of an "exotic intensifier". There then follows a chromatically descending bass line over the i minor chord, leading to VI (F7) and the transition into the 4/4 chorus. The latter presents as a heavy rock 12-bar blues but is abbreviated to 10 bars since the V chord functions as a re-transition to the verse. Pedler also comments on the unusual aspect of the song concluding on an ♭VI (Fmaj7) chord in A minor key.

The set of pronouns that form the song's title are a conventional way of referring to the ego in Hindu and Buddhist philosophy. The lyrics reference the Bhagavad Gita 2:71-72, part of which advocates a life "devoid of any sense of mineness or egotism". (Note: These final verses in Chapter 2 of the Gita can be translated as: "They are forever free who renounce all selfish desires and break away from the ego-cage of 'I', 'me' and 'mine' to be united with the Lord. This is the supreme state. Attain to this, and pass from death to immortality.") According to spiritual biographer Gary Tillery, the song targets McCartney and Lennon "for being so fixated on their own interests" but also laments all of humankind's propensity for egocentricity. The lyrics state that this self-centredness is constant and in all actions and desires. Tillery says that the message is both ironic and tragic from a Hindu perspective, which contends that ego is merely an illusion; egocentricity is therefore akin to a single drop of water focusing on its own course at the expense of the ocean surrounding it.

== Twickenham rehearsals ==
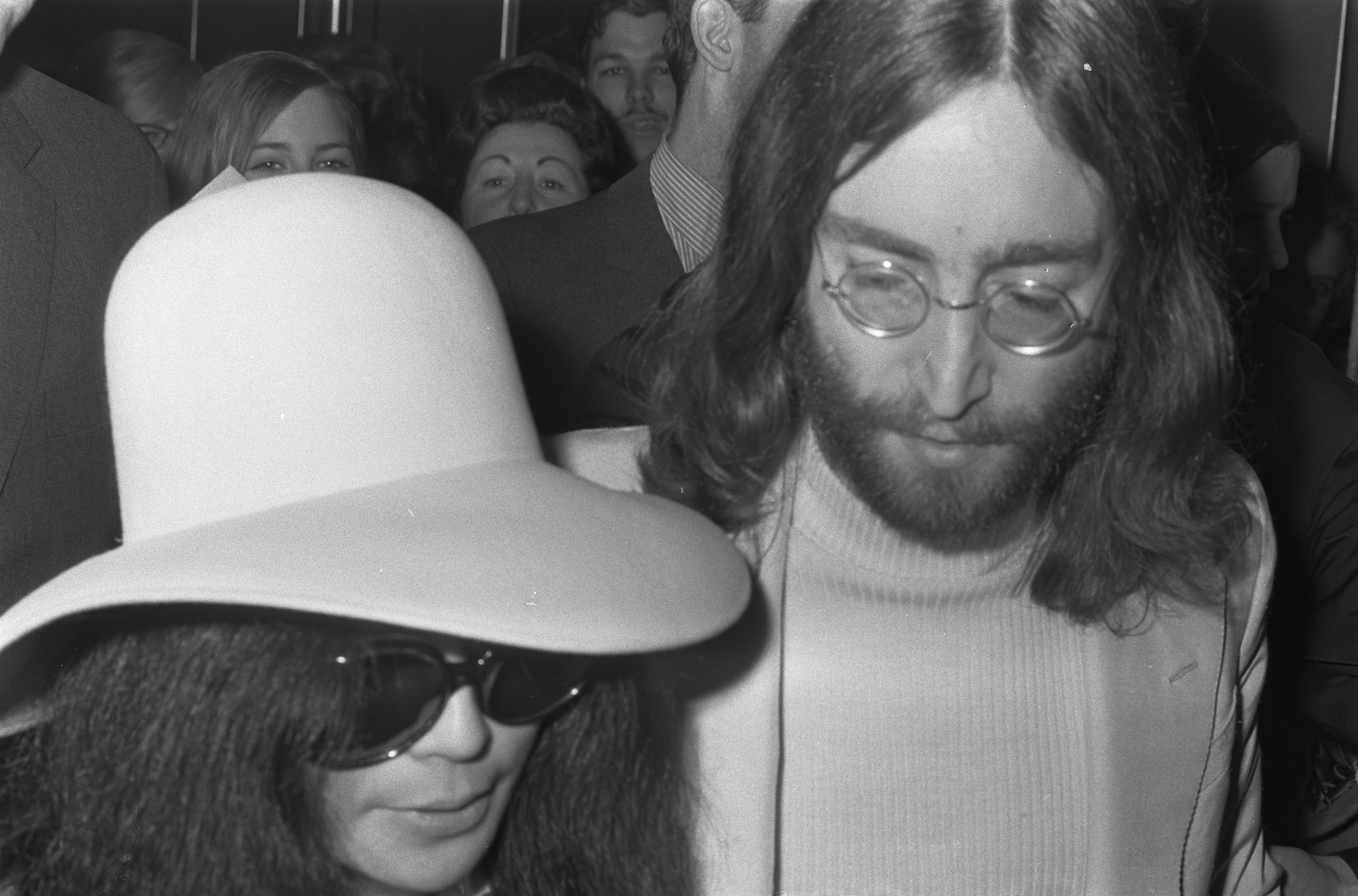
John Lennon's dependence on Yoko Ono (left) contributed to the divisive atmosphere that Harrison sought to address in the song.

The rehearsals at Twickenham Film Studios were filmed and recorded by director Michael Lindsay-Hogg with the intention that the documentary film would accompany a televised concert by the Beatles. On the morning of 8 January, Harrison played "I Me Mine" to Ringo Starr while they waited for Lennon and McCartney to arrive. He introduced the song as a "heavy waltz" and joked to Starr, with reference to McCartney's plans for the concert: "I don't care if you don't want it in your show." Harrison said he might use the song in a musical he was planning to write with Apple press officer Derek Taylor about the company.

The Beatles spent considerable time rehearsing "I Me Mine" on 8 January, performing it a total of 41 times. As rehearsed, the song was just a minute and a half in length. McCartney and Starr provided enthusiastic support, according to author John Winn, while Lennon "mostly opts out". Lennon ridiculed the song. In Sulpy and Schweighardt's description of the rehearsals, Lennon "jokes that a collection of freaks can dance along with George's waltz" and he tells Harrison to "get lost – that the Beatles only play rock and roll and there's no place in the group's playlist for a Spanish waltz". McCartney also mocked "I Me Mine" by singing in a Spanish accent. According to Beatles biographer Kenneth Womack, Lennon's derision, which followed his ignoring suggestions from Harrison regarding musical arrangements over the previous days, was an example of Lennon "baiting" his bandmate. Womack says this was informed by Harrison being the most outspoken of the Beatles in objecting to Ono's constant presence, and by Lennon's annoyance at Harrison's abundance of new songs. In Everett's view, Lennon's comments about "I Me Mine" suggest he was "jealous at Harrison's widening vocal range as well as his confidence in his compositional abilities". (Note: Everett states that whereas Lennon's songwriting had been "central" to the White Album, "Harrison's twelve new compositions in January 1969 (including the untaped 'Wah-Wah') are far more interesting than those of his elder".)

Lennon made similarly derogatory remarks that day about McCartney's ballads "Let It Be" and "The Long and Winding Road". According to Gould, Harrison was particularly upset that his bandmates griped about the time spent learning "I Me Mine" yet then indulged in "a laborious rehearsal of a song like 'Maxwell's Silver Hammer' which struck George as a paragon of pop inanity". On 10 January, Harrison walked out of the sessions, weary of what he considered to be McCartney's overbearing attitude and Lennon's lack of engagement with the project.

== Production ==
=== Recording ===
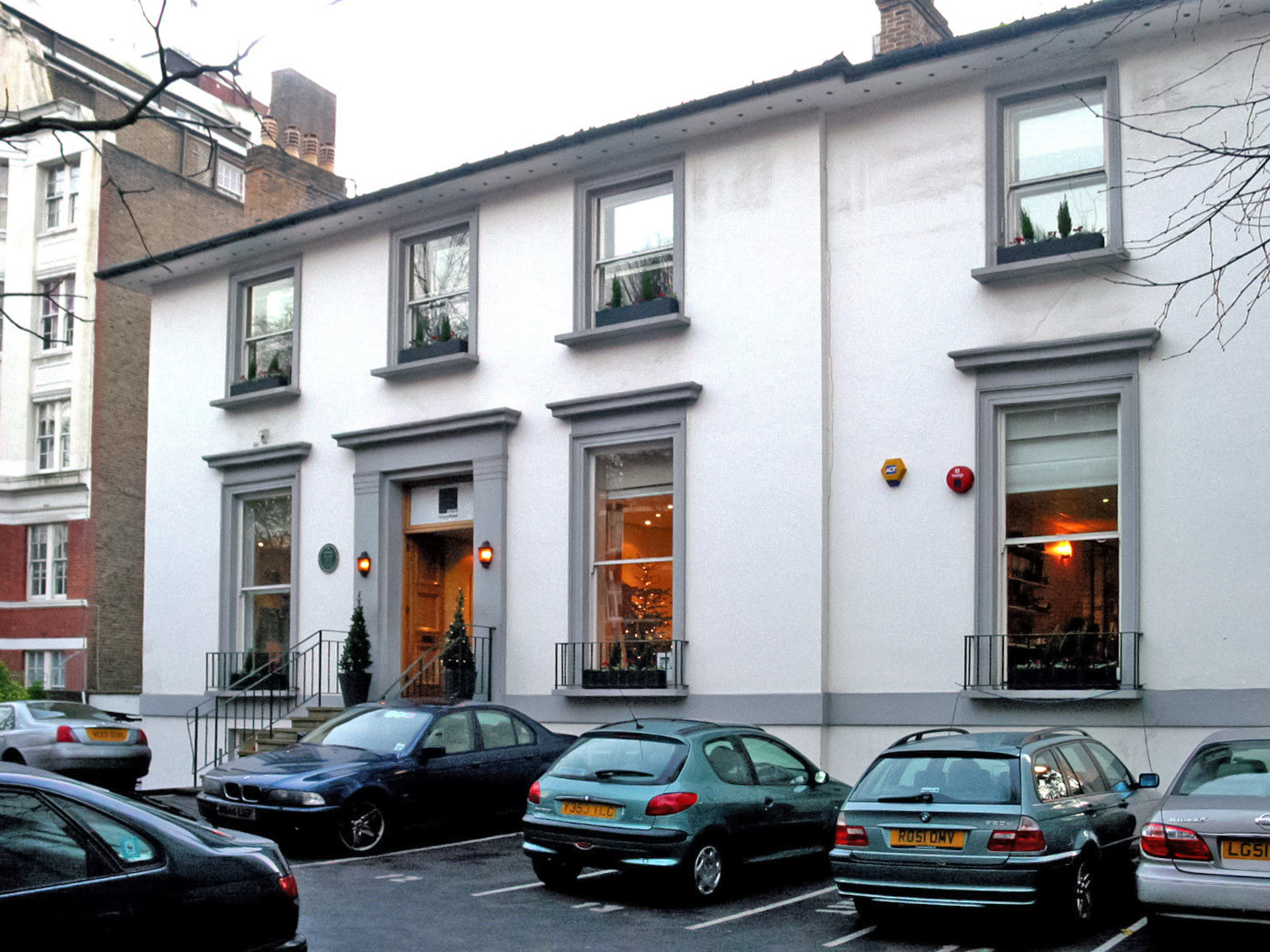
Abbey Road Studios (formerly EMI Studios) in 2005. "I Me Mine" was the last new song recorded by the Beatles before their break-up in April 1970.

In October 1969, Lindsay-Hogg completed an edit of the documentary film, which included footage of Harrison playing "I Me Mine" for Starr. (Note: His comment that "I don't care if you don't want it in your show" was also included, with a stray guitar note added to mask an expletive.) Harrison, Starr and McCartney were then shown performing the song while Lennon danced with Ono. Since the scenes were relatively prominent, the Beatles had to record the song for inclusion on the accompanying soundtrack album, still titled Get Back but soon to become Let It Be. On 3 January 1970, Harrison, McCartney and Starr met at EMI Studios (now Abbey Road Studios) to work on the track with producer George Martin. Lennon did not attend the session; having privately left the band in September, he and Ono were on holiday in Denmark at the time.

You all will have read that Dave Dee is no longer with us. But Mickey and Tich and I would just like to carry on the good work that's always gone down in number two [EMI Studio 2].

— Harrison's announcement before take 15 of "I Me Mine", referring to Lennon's departure from the Beatles

The group recorded 16 takes of the basic track, with Harrison on acoustic guitar and singing a guide vocal, McCartney on bass guitar, and Starr playing drums. Beatles historian Mark Lewisohn describes the session as an efficient one in which the bandmates indulged in an instrumental jam after take 6 and also played a "delightful" cover of Buddy Holly's "Peggy Sue Got Married", sung by Harrison before beginning take 12. At the start of take 15, Harrison delivered a mock press statement in which he made a joking reference to Lennon's absence by recasting the four Beatles as members of the British pop group Dave Dee, Dozy, Beaky, Mick & Tich.

Aside from vocals, the overdubs on take 16 were two distorted electric lead guitars (Harrison) and lead acoustic parts (Harrison and McCartney), and McCartney's Hammond organ and electric piano. The recorded track lasted 1 minute 34 seconds. When engineer Glyn Johns compiled the proposed Get Back album, he retained the studio chatter that preceded take 16, as Harrison says, "All right. Are you ready, Ringo?" and Starr replies, "Ready, George!" The pre-take 15 announcement, followed by take 16 of "I Me Mine", was released on the Anthology 3 outtakes compilation in 1996.

=== Track extension and orchestral overdubs ===
As with Johns' May 1969 version of Get Back, the Beatles rejected his January 1970 submission of the album. Lennon and Harrison then asked American producer Phil Spector to rework Let It Be. (Note: Lennon and Harrison invited Spector to salvage the project after being impressed with his production of Lennon's Plastic Ono Band single "Instant Karma!") Spector decided to extend the length of "I Me Mine" by repeating the rock-style chorus in the middle of the song and the second verse. The extension was carried out on 23 March, with Harrison present for much of the remixing session. It was achieved by copying the tape from the 1:20 mark, after the line "flowing more freely than wine", thereby adding a further 51 seconds to the running time.

Along with "The Long and Winding Road" and "Across the Universe", Spector chose to augment "I Me Mine" with his signature Wall of Sound. On 1 April, he overdubbed a 27-piece string section, six brass players, and additional drums by Starr. Although Lewisohn states that the female choir hired by Spector for the session did not sing on "I Me Mine", music critic Richie Unterberger lists their contribution among the song's Wall of Sound characteristics. To the consternation of the EMI engineers, Spector also insisted on hearing the tracks with full tape, plate and chamber echo in place – effects that were usually introduced during final mixing and proved difficult to add.

As the last of the three songs to be amended by Spector on 1 April, these additions to "I Me Mine" were the final overdubs on a Beatles track before the group's break-up. The final version, as "re-produced" by Spector, was included on Let It Be. A similar edit, without the orchestral overdubs but retaining the repeated portion, was made available on the Let It Be... Naked album in 2003.

== Album and film release ==
Let It Be was issued on 8 May 1970 with "I Me Mine" sequenced as the fourth track, between "Across the Universe" and "Dig It". The release followed a month after McCartney's public announcement that he was leaving the Beatles, which had resulted in the group's break-up. For Harrison, the break-up provided the impetus for starting work, with Spector as his co-producer, on the triple album All Things Must Pass, which includes songs that had been overlooked by the Beatles.

The pre-release press screening of the Let It Be film took place in London on 18 May. Unaware of the events at Twickenham Films Studios in January 1969, Nina Hibbin commented in the socialist newspaper Morning Star: "George Harrison, with his strong-boned face and shut-in expression, looks as if he could fit into any tough and isolated position – as a shepherd in Bulgaria or the manager of a suburban post office." Music critic Tim Riley includes the scene where Harrison debuts "I Me Mine" for Starr among the documentary's "knockabout moments", but adds that the film's "emotional undertow is an impenetrable dance of egos", as demonstrated by Lennon and Ono waltzing to the song. (Note: He also cites the scenes where Lennon remains silent apart from when singing, McCartney's disapproval of Lennon's vocal in "I've Got a Feeling", and Harrison's curt response to musical directions from McCartney.)

According to critic Garry Mulholland, the scene featuring Lennon and Ono waltzing, "in love, temporary oblivious to the band politics", provides "the only glimpse of pleasure" in the Twickenham-based portion of the film, which is otherwise "all about McCartney, holding court, talking in that phoney mid-Atlantic twang". Media theorist Stephanie Fremaux writes that the "I Me Mine" segment shows Harrison resolutely ignoring his surroundings, as "Throughout the film, he confronts the idea of image and persona, commenting that, like solo music, each Beatle should just be themselves rather than continually try to contrive images to adhere to." (Note: Fremaux rues that Lindsay-Hogg's final edit omits many of Harrison's remarks regarding image. She highlights a conversation about the band's 1968 meditation sojourn in India where Lennon and McCartney agree that the Beatles hid their true personalities, a contention that Harrison describes as "the biggest joke", since the purpose of the trip had been to be their true selves, and adds: "if you were really yourself, you wouldn't be any of who we are now.")

== Critical reception ==
Among contemporary reviews of the album, Alan Smith of the NME derided Let It Be as "a cheapskate epitaph" and a "sad and tatty end" to the band's career, but he admired the "Russian-flavoured 'I Me Mine'" as "a strong ballad with a frantic centre". In Melody Maker, Richard Williams wrote: "'I Me Mine' has a great organ/guitar intro, meditative verses and a tempo switch in and out of the rocking chorus, which has guitar riffs one step away from Chuck Berry. George put a lot of strength into this." (Note: In his January 1971 review of All Things Must Pass, Williams commented: "Harrison's light has been hidden under the egos of McCartney and Lennon. From time to time there have been hints on several of their albums that he was more than he was being allowed to be.") Reviewing for Rolling Stone, John Mendelsohn ridiculed Spector's use of lush orchestration, particularly on "The Long and Winding Road", adding: "'I Me Mine,' the waltz sections of which reminds one very definitely of something from one of The Al Jolson Story's more maudlin moments, almost benefits from such treatment ... As [Spector has] left it, though, it, like 'Winding Road,' is funny enough to find cloying but not funny enough to enjoy laughing at."

In 2002, David Fricke of Rolling Stone included the song in his list of the "25 Essential Harrison Performances" and said: "Harrison signed off [from the Beatles] in style; his angry, grinding guitar is the honest sound of exhaustion and hard-won freedom." Dave Lewis of Classic Rock ranked "I Me Mine" at number 6 in his 2016 list of the ten songs that "highlight George Harrison's profound contribution to The Beatles". He said that it "hinted at the egos at play" that led to the break-up.

According to Beatles biographer Ian MacDonald, "I Me Mine" "would have been a more truthful choice" for the B-side of the Beatles' final single, "The Long and Winding Road", rather than Harrison's "For You Blue", which was chosen instead. He says the song "juxtaposes a self-pitying Gallic waltz (complete with Piaf wobble) against a clamorous blues shuffle – suggesting that selfishness, personal or collective, subtle or crude, is always the same". Although he describes Harrison's lyric as "typically thoughtful", MacDonald finds that it "touches a nadir of worldly pessimism in the line 'Even those tears: I me mine'". In a 2003 review for Mojo, John Harris described Harrison's vocal as "frequently pitched just short of falsetto" and a "delight", and admired the string arrangement for "teas[ing] out the sense of camp" underlying the song."

Author Mark Hertsgaard includes "I Me Mine" among the "honorable mentions" that counter Let It Be's reputation as a substandard final album by the band. He comments that Spector's orchestral overdubs were less intrusive than on "The Long and Winding Road" and "Across the Universe" because "the Beatles' playing was already so compelling", and he highlights Harrison's guitar playing and the changes in time signature as elements that lifted a potentially bleak theme and "gave the song real bite". Less impressed, Tim Riley rues that Spector's orchestration and choir fail to explore the ironies behind the joyful rock 'n' roll chorus "mocking the hubris of the verses", as his additions instead "virtually drown them". Riley concludes: "As unfettered rock 'n' roll with acoustic verses, Harrison's song answers greed with a crude groove; with Spector's ornaments, the track is a washout."

== Legacy ==
Let It Be is the sound of four grown men with shared histories and diverging futures trying to squeeze blood from stones ... "I Me Mine" famously stands as the last new Beatles song recorded before the group's split. Funny that it's a Harrison tune – and a corker at that, an attack on egotism that turns from doomy 6/8 orch-pop ballad to scorching '50s-style rocker.

— Kenneth Partridge, Billboard, May 2015

Although a session on 20 August 1969, to oversee the creation of the master tape of their Abbey Road album, marked the last time that all four Beatles were present in the recording studio, "I Me Mine" was the last new song recorded by the Beatles. In his book Revolution in the Head, MacDonald writes that this was a "poetic stroke of fate", given the song's subject matter. Harrison titled his 1980 autobiography after the song. It was the first autobiography by a former Beatle and originally published by Genesis Publications as a luxury leather-bound edition in the style of the same company's Log of HMS Bounty. The title was intended as an ironic comment on the falseness of adhering to a self-focused perspective. According to Harrison's foreword, he titled the book I, Me, Mine to acknowledge that it "could also be seen as 'a little ego detour'" of his own. (Note: Originally issued in a limited edition of 2000 copies, the book's retail price was £148 (equivalent to £635 in 2025). The foreword concludes: "I have suffered for this book; now it's your turn.")

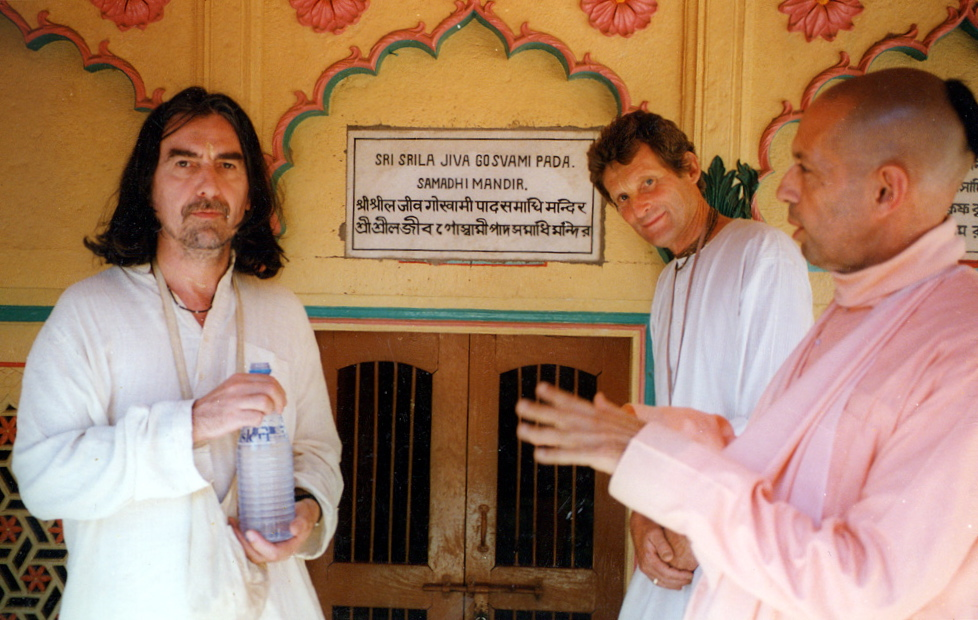
Harrison (left) with friends from the Hare Krishna movement in 1996. The song helped establish his legacy as one of rock music's most overtly spiritual songwriters.

"I Me Mine" came to symbolise Harrison's perspective on an ego-less and depersonalised existence. According to Christian historian and theologian Dale Allison, this theme is one of three ways in which Harrison's body of work represents a "religious scheme of salvation", the first of which he identifies as: "Our problem is that our individual egos attach themselves to the material world ... Engrossed with things that don't really matter, we become preoccupied with the visible, with the transient instead of the transcendent ..." In an article coinciding with the release of Martin Scorsese's 2011 documentary George Harrison: Living in the Material World, Steve Rabey of the Religion News Service cited "I Me Mine" among the Beatles songs that contributed to Harrison's standing as "perhaps the most explicitly and consistently theological rock star of the last half-century". Rabey added: "he nudged his bandmates – and his listener fans – a bit further to the East, encouraging audiences to open themselves to new (or very old) spiritual influences."

Author and academic Jeffery D. Long, an advocate for religious pluralism, credited Harrison, followed by the 1982 film Gandhi and the work of writer Fritjof Capra, as the influences that led him to study the Bhagavad Gita and embrace Hindu Dharma. In a 2015 interview, Long quoted "I Me Mine" when outlining how the concepts of self and consciousness differ in the Hindu, Buddhist and Jain traditions. Speaking at a TED Conference in June 2007, Tibetan Buddhist Robert Thurman referenced the song when he discussed the power of true empathy that accompanies the realisation that "you are the other being", adding:

Somehow by that opening, you can see the deeper nature of life. And you can get away from this terrible iron circle of I, me-me, mine. Like the Beatles used to sing. You know, they really learned everything in the '60s. Too bad nobody ever woke up to it, and they're trying to suppress it since then. I, me-me, mine. It's like a perfect song, that song. A perfect teaching.

In March 2015, the NME listed the track at number 94 in its list "100 Greatest Beatles Songs As Chosen By Music's A-Listers". One of the members of the indie rock band Gengahr commented that "When exploring music at a young age I remember this song's weird change of time signatures and rhythm between sections confusing me as to how it was able to exist as one song, but it just does", and he recognised the drum sound and rhythm as a precursor to early hip hop.

Marc Ford recorded a version of "I Me Mine" for the album Songs from the Material World: A Tribute to George Harrison, released in February 2003 to coincide with what would have been Harrison's 60th birthday. Beth Orton recorded the song as a medley with "Dig It" for Let It Be Revisited, a CD included with the October 2010 issue of Mojo. At the George Fest tribute to Harrison in 2014, "I Me Mine" was performed by Britt Daniel of the band Spoon, who said that it was his favourite song by Harrison. Elliott Smith and Laibach have each covered the song.

== Personnel ==
According to Ian MacDonald and Mark Lewisohn, except where noted:

The Beatles

- George Harrison – lead and harmony vocals, acoustic and electric guitars
- Paul McCartney – harmony vocal, bass guitar, Hammond organ, electric piano
- Ringo Starr – drums

Additional musicians

- Uncredited – 18 violins, four violas, four cellos, harp, three trumpets, three trombones
- Uncredited – female choir
- Richard Hewson – brass and string arrangements

== Sources ==
- Allison, Dale C. Jr (2006). The Love There That's Sleeping: The Art and Spirituality of George Harrison. New York, NY: Continuum. ISBN 978-0-8264-1917-0.
- Badman, Keith (2001). The Beatles Diary Volume 2: After the Break-Up 1970–2001. London: Omnibus Press. ISBN 978-0-7119-8307-6.
- The Beatles (2000). The Beatles Anthology. San Francisco, CA: Chronicle Books. ISBN 0-8118-2684-8.
- Clayson, Alan (2003). George Harrison. London: Sanctuary. ISBN 1-86074-489-3.
- Doggett, Peter (2011). You Never Give Me Your Money: The Beatles After the Breakup. New York, NY: It Books. ISBN 978-0-06-177418-8.
- The Editors of Rolling Stone (2002). Harrison. New York, NY: Rolling Stone Press. ISBN 978-0-7432-3581-5.
- Everett, Walter (1999). The Beatles as Musicians: Revolver Through the Anthology. New York, NY: Oxford University Press. ISBN 0-19-512941-5.
- Fremaux, Stephanie (2018). The Beatles on Screen: From Pop Stars to Musicians. New York, NY: Bloomsbury Academic. ISBN 978-1-5013-2713-1.
- Gould, Jonathan (2007). Can't Buy Me Love: The Beatles, Britain and America. London: Piatkus. ISBN 978-0-7499-2988-6.
- Hamelman, Steve (2009). "On Their Way Home: The Beatles in 1969 and 1970". In Womack, Kenneth (ed.). The Cambridge Companion to the Beatles. Cambridge, UK: Cambridge University Press. ISBN 978-0-521-68976-2.
- Harrison, George (2002) [1980]. I, Me, Mine. San Francisco, CA: Chronicle Books. ISBN 978-0-8118-5900-4.
- Harry, Bill (2003). The George Harrison Encyclopedia. London: Virgin Books. ISBN 978-0-7535-0822-0.
- Hertsgaard, Mark (1996). A Day in the Life: The Music and Artistry of the Beatles. London: Pan Books. ISBN 0-330-33891-9.
- Inglis, Ian (2010). The Words and Music of George Harrison. Santa Barbara, CA: Praeger. ISBN 978-0-313-37532-3.
- Leng, Simon (2006). While My Guitar Gently Weeps: The Music of George Harrison. Milwaukee, WI: Hal Leonard. ISBN 978-1-4234-0609-9.
- Lewisohn, Mark (2005) [1988]. The Complete Beatles Recording Sessions: The Official Story of the Abbey Road Years 1962–1970. London: Bounty Books. ISBN 978-0-7537-2545-0.
- MacDonald, Ian (2005). Revolution in the Head: The Beatles' Records and the Sixties. London: Pimlico. ISBN 1-84413-828-3.
- Miles, Barry (2001). The Beatles Diary Volume 1: The Beatles Years. London: Omnibus Press. ISBN 0-7119-8308-9.
- Mulholland, Garry (2010). Popcorn: Fifty Years of Rock 'n' Roll Movies. London: Hachette. ISBN 978-1-409112204.
- O'Gorman, Martin (2003). "Film on Four". Mojo Special Limited Edition: 1000 Days of Revolution (The Beatles' Final Years – Jan 1, 1968 to Sept 27, 1970). London: Emap. pp. 68–75.
- Pedler, Dominic (2003). The Songwriting Secrets of the Beatles. London: Omnibus Press. ISBN 978-0-7119-8167-6.
- Riley, Tim (2002) [1988]. Tell Me Why – The Beatles: Album by Album, Song by Song, the Sixties and After. Cambridge, MA: Da Capo Press. ISBN 978-0-306-81120-3.
- Spizer, Bruce (2003). The Beatles on Apple Records. New Orleans, LA: 498 Productions. ISBN 0-9662649-4-0.
- Strawson, Galen (2000). "The Phenomenology and Ontology of the Self". In Zahavi, Dan (ed.). Exploring the Self: Philosophical and Psychopathological Perspectives on Self-Experience. Amsterdam: John Benjamins Publishing. ISBN 978-9-02725143-5.
- Sulpy, Doug; Schweighardt, Ray (1999). Get Back: The Unauthorized Chronicle of the Beatles' Let It Be Disaster. New York, NY: St. Martin's Griffin. ISBN 0-312-19981-3.
- Tillery, Gary (2011). Working Class Mystic: A Spiritual Biography of George Harrison. Wheaton, IL: Quest Books. ISBN 978-0-8356-0900-5.
- Unterberger, Richie (2006). The Unreleased Beatles: Music & Film. San Francisco, CA: Backbeat Books. ISBN 978-0-87930-892-6.
- Winn, John C. (2009). That Magic Feeling: The Beatles' Recorded Legacy, Volume Two, 1966–1970. New York, NY: Three Rivers Press. ISBN 978-0-307-45239-9.
- Womack, Kenneth (2007). Long and Winding Roads: The Evolving Artistry of the Beatles. New York, NY: Continuum. ISBN 978-0-8264-1746-6.
- Womack, Kenneth (2014). The Beatles Encyclopedia: Everything Fab Four. Santa Barbara, CA: ABC-CLIO. ISBN 978-0-313-39171-2.
