= Dig a Pony =

- Northern Songs sheet music cover

Song by the Beatles

from the album Let It Be
- Released: 8 May 1970
- Recorded: 30 January 1969
- Studio: EMI and Olympic Sound, London
- Venue: Apple Corps rooftop, London
- Genre: Blues, hard rock
- Length: 3:52
- Label: Apple
- Songwriter: Lennon–McCartney
- Producer: Phil Spector

Audio sample
- "Dig a Pony": file; help

"Dig a Pony" is a song by the English rock band the Beatles from their 1970 album Let It Be. It was written by John Lennon and credited to Lennon–McCartney. The band recorded the song on 30 January 1969, during their rooftop concert at the Apple Corps building on Savile Row in central London.

== Composition ==
"Dig a Pony" is in the key of A major and in 3/4 time. It was originally called "All I Want Is You". John Lennon said the song was "a piece of garbage", though he expressed similar scorn for many of his own songs. It was written for his soon-to-be wife Yoko Ono, and features a multitude of strange, seemingly nonsensical phrases strung together in what Lennon referred to as a Bob Dylan style of lyric.

In author Ian MacDonald's description, the lyrics "celebrat[e] countercultural claims that society's old values and taboos were dead, that life was a game and art a free-for-all, and (especially) that words meant whatever the hell one wished them to".

"Dig a Pony" was among the first songs the Beatles worked on during day one of their filmed rehearsals for a planned return to live performance, in January 1969. Lennon introduced it to George Harrison soon after arriving at Twickenham Film Studios on 2 January, as the pair ran through their latest songs.

== Recording ==
"Dig a Pony" was one of the songs on Let It Be recorded at the rooftop concert on 30 January 1969. Kevin Harrington, the band's roadie, held up Lennon's lyrics for him while he sang. It begins with a false start, caused by Ringo Starr yelling "Hold it!" because he was putting out his cigarette and had both of his drum sticks in his right hand. On the recording, the sound of someone blowing his nose right after Starr's interjection can be heard, which Mark Lewisohn attributes to Lennon.

A studio take of the song from 22 January appears on the 1996 Anthology 3 outtakes compilation. The sessions took place at the Beatles' Apple Studio after they had abandoned the filmed rehearsals at Twickenham. When Glyn Johns compiled an album titled Get Back for the band's consideration in 1969, he favoured the 22 January recording of "Dig a Pony" over the rooftop performance. As originally included in the rooftop performance also, the studio recording begins and ends with the line "All I want is ..." When Phil Spector prepared the album (now titled Let It Be) for release in March 1970, he selected the 30 January live version but shortened the track by cutting the opening and closing "All I want is ..." refrains. These edits were retained for the Let It Be... Naked mix of the rooftop version, issued in 2003, which also omits the false start.

== Release and reception ==
Apple Records issued Let It Be on 8 May 1970 with "Dig a Pony" sequenced as the second track, between "Two of Us" and "Across the Universe". The release followed a month after McCartney's comments in a questionnaire promoting his self-titled solo album had resulted in the Beatles' break-up. Early American pressings of Let It Be mistitled the song as "I Dig a Pony".

Reviewing the album for Melody Maker, Richard Williams said that "Dig a Pony" was the only genuinely new song by Lennon and he admired the "tremendously funky unison guitar riff", adding that "the insane words and wandering tune are typical contemporary Lennon". Having bemoaned Spector's addition of orchestral and choral overdubs elsewhere on Let It Be, John Mendelsohn of Rolling Stone welcomed the song as an example of the producer's minimal alteration of some of the January 1969 recordings. He described it as "crossword-puzzlish" and said that the combination of "urgent old rocker's vocal" and similarity to "such earlier Lennonisms as 'Happiness Is a Warm Gun'" almost made up for Spector's omission of "Don't Let Me Down" and "Save the Last Dance for Me".

Writing for Mojo in 2001, John Harris dismissed the track as "pretty execrable" and an example of Lennon's reduced creativity during Let It Be, as well as a reason that Lennon's criticism of Harrison's songwriting in one of the Twickenham sessions contributed to Harrison's decision to leave the band. Neil McCormick of The Daily Telegraph views "Dig a Pony" as "embarrassing", saying that Lennon was "the guiltiest party" with regard to the generally uninspiring songs on Let It Be.

Among Beatles biographers, Ian MacDonald described the song as "inconsequential fun", saying of the counterculture-inspired lyrics: "Suspect even in 1967, such whimsy was looking distinctly bedraggled by 1969, but enough people wanted it to be true to ensure that it survived in the minds of progressive educationalists for the next twenty years." In his view, the track benefits from the discipline imposed on the Beatles by having to perform in public, resulting in a "real ensemble performance ... and even a hint of swing". Mark Hertsgaard deems it a "lyrically muddled love call to Yoko" and lacking in melody, yet the combination of McCartney's high harmony singing and the inventiveness of Harrison's lead guitar part "made it seem more interesting than it actually was". Citing the lyrics, Peter Doggett says that Lennon was rightly dismissive of the song, while Chris Ingham calls it "riffily convoluted gobbledygook" with a "lugubrious chromatic approach" that Spector's editing wisely pared back.

== Personnel ==
According to Walter Everett:

The Beatles

- John Lennon – lead vocal, rhythm guitar
- Paul McCartney – harmony vocal, bass guitar
- George Harrison – lead guitar
- Ringo Starr – drums

Additional musician

- Billy Preston – electric piano

== Sources ==
- Everett, Walter (1999). The Beatles as Musicians: Revolver Through the Anthology. New York, NY: Oxford University Press. ISBN 978-0-19-512941-0.
- Hertsgaard, Mark (1996). A Day in the Life: The Music and Artistry of the Beatles. London: Pan Books. ISBN 0-330-33891-9.
- Ingham, Chris (2006). The Rough Guide to the Beatles. London: Rough Guides/Penguin. ISBN 978-1-84836-525-4.
- Lewisohn, Mark (1992). The Complete Beatles Chronicle: The Definitive Day-by-Day Guide to the Beatles' Entire Career. New York, NY: Harmony Books. ISBN 0-517-58100-0.
- MacDonald, Ian (1998). Revolution in the Head: The Beatles' Records and the Sixties. London: Pimlico. ISBN 978-0-7126-6697-8.
- Miles, Barry (2001). The Beatles Diary Volume 1: The Beatles Years. London: Omnibus Press. ISBN 0-7119-8308-9.
- Sheff, David (2000) [1981]. All We Are Saying: The Last Major Interview with John Lennon and Yoko Ono. New York, NY: St. Martin's Press. ISBN 0-312-25464-4.
- Spizer, Bruce (2003). The Beatles on Apple Records. New Orleans, LA: 498 Productions. ISBN 0-9662649-4-0.
- Sulpy, Doug; Schweighardt, Ray (1999). Get Back: The Unauthorized Chronicle of the Beatles' Let It Be Disaster. New York, NY: St. Martin's Griffin. ISBN 0-312-19981-3.
- Winn, John C. (2009). That Magic Feeling: The Beatles' Recorded Legacy, Volume Two, 1966–1970. New York, NY: Three Rivers Press. ISBN 978-0-307-45239-9.
