= For You Blue =

- US picture sleeve

Single by the Beatles

from the album Let It Be
- A-side: "The Long and Winding Road"
- Released: 11 May 1970
- Recorded: 25 January 1969, 8 January 1970
- Studio: Apple and Olympic Sound, London
- Genre: Country blues
- Length: 2:32
- Label: Apple
- Songwriter: George Harrison
- Producer: Phil Spector

The Beatles US singles chronology
"Let It Be" (1970)	"The Long and Winding Road" / "For You Blue" (1970)	"Got to Get You into My Life" (1976)

"For You Blue" is a song by the English rock band the Beatles from their 1970 album Let It Be. The track was written by George Harrison as a love song to his wife, Pattie Boyd. It was also the B-side to the "Long and Winding Road" single, issued in many countries, but not Britain, and was listed with that song when the single topped the US Billboard Hot 100 and Canada's national chart in June 1970. On the Cash Box Top 100 chart, which measured the US performance of single sides individually, "For You Blue" peaked at number 71.

The song is a twelve-bar blues in the country blues style. When writing "For You Blue", Harrison was partly influenced by his stay with Bob Dylan and the Band in Woodstock over November–December 1968. Whereas that visit had been a musically rewarding experience for Harrison, the Beatles first worked on the song amid an atmosphere of discord, during the filmed rehearsals that made up part of the Let It Be documentary film. Recorded at the group's Apple Studio in London in late January 1969, the song includes a lap steel guitar part played by John Lennon. Among music critics, some have admired the track for its lighthearted qualities and as a good band performance. Other commentators identify it as an inconsequential song, particularly in relation to some of the Harrison compositions that his bandmates rejected over the Let It Be period.

In 1976, Capitol Records included "For You Blue" on the compilation album The Best of George Harrison. An alternative take of the track appeared on the Beatles' 1996 compilation Anthology 3. A live version recorded during Harrison's 1974 North American tour received a limited release on the Songs by George Harrison EP in 1988. Paul McCartney performed the song at the Concert for George in November 2002, a year after Harrison's death.

== Background and composition ==
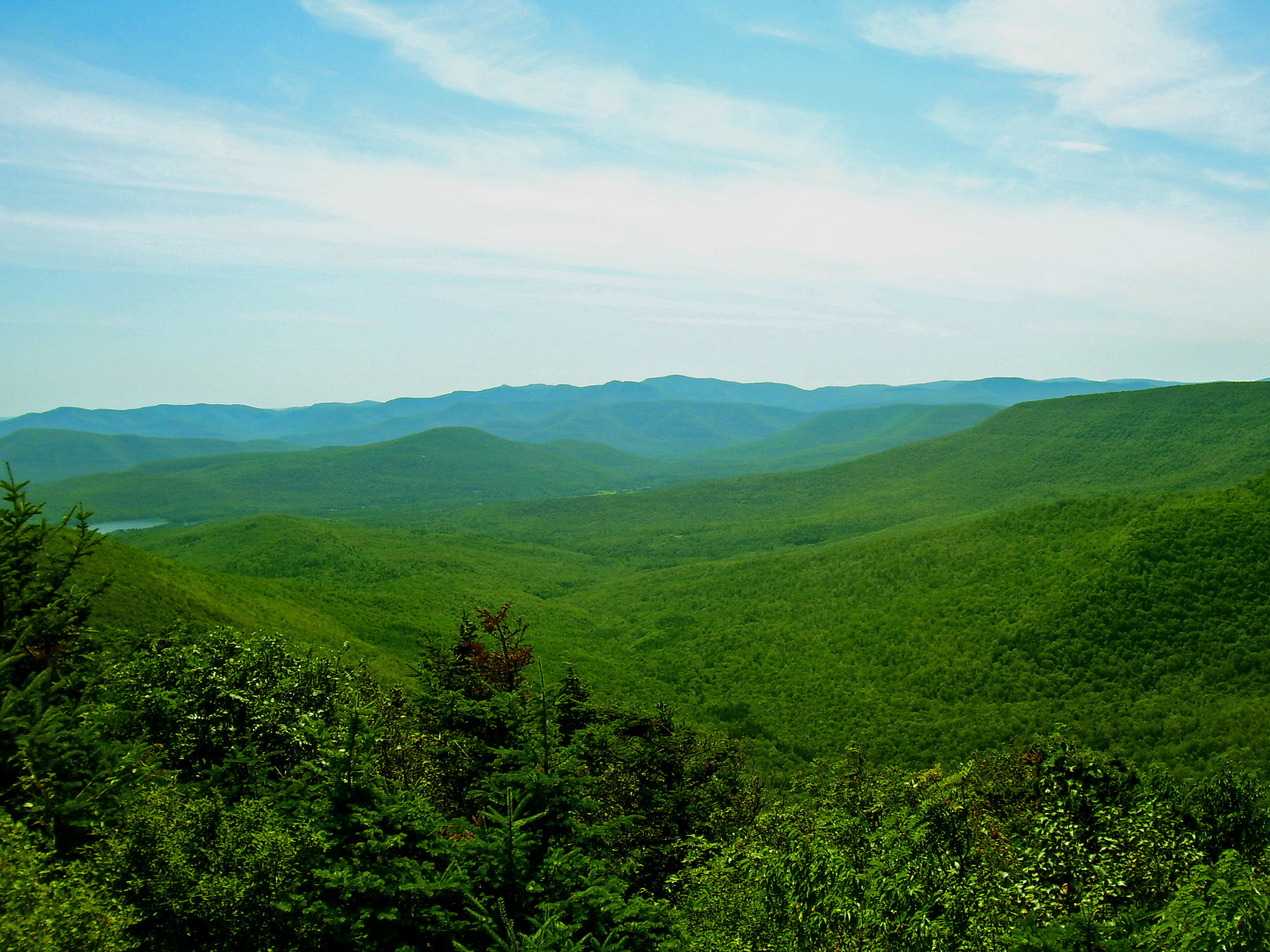
The Catskill Mountains in upstate New York. Harrison's late 1968 visit to Woodstock, where he spent time with Bob Dylan and the Band, served as part of his musical inspiration for the song.

George Harrison wrote "For You Blue" in late 1968 as a love song to his wife Pattie Boyd. In his autobiography, I, Me, Mine, he describes the composition as "a simple twelve-bar song following all the normal principles except it's happy-go-lucky!" The song was partly influenced by Harrison's recent stay in Woodstock in upstate New York, where he had collaborated with Bob Dylan and jammed with the Band. The visit allowed Harrison to experience a musical camaraderie that contrasted with the tense atmosphere in the Beatles over much of 1968, particularly during the recording of their self-titled double album (also known as "the White Album"). In addition, the creative equality Harrison enjoyed among these musicians, as on his recent collaborations with Eric Clapton, contrasted with the continued dominance of John Lennon and Paul McCartney in the Beatles during a period when Harrison was emerging as a prolific songwriter.

"For You Blue" is a country blues song in the musical key of D. Aside from the introduction, it is one of the few original songs by the Beatles in which every section follows the twelve-bar blues (I-IV-V) pattern. The five-bar introduction deviates from the pattern due to its length and the inclusion of what musicologist Alan Pollack terms a "V-of-V" chord – namely, E7 in the home key. On the Beatles' recording, Harrison performs this opening section alone, playing a series of "elegant introductory hammer-ons", according to musicologist Walter Everett. The song's bluesy feel is accentuated by the addition to the minor pentatonic scale of a ♭7 note on each of the I (D7), IV (G7) and V (A7) chords. (Note: Harrison uses a capo on the fifth fret of his guitar, allowing him to play chord shapes as if the song was a twelve-bar in the key of A.) Harrison opts for a popular variant within the twelve-bar blues formula, by moving briefly to the IV chord for the second bar, rather than remaining on I until the fifth bar.

The composition comprises two verses, a two-round instrumental break, and two further verses. In his lyrics, Harrison unashamedly states his love for Boyd; Pollack describes the message as "unusually unmuddled romantic euphoria". Early in the song, Harrison tells her, "I loved you from the moment I saw you", and by the last verse, in the description of author Ian Inglis, "[Boyd's] 'sweet and lovely' personality makes her irresistible ... he now loves her 'more than ever.'"

As reproduced in I, Me, Mine, Harrison's original handwritten lyrics show the song title as "For You Blues". The song was named "George's Blues (Because You're Sweet and Lovely)" when the Beatles recorded it in late January 1969, and then "Because You're Sweet and Lovely" when mixing began on the unreleased Get Back album two months later. By the time that album had been presented to the Beatles for their approval, in late May, the song was listed as "For You Blue".

== Twickenham rehearsals ==
"For You Blue" was one of the many new songs that the Beatles rehearsed at Twickenham Film Studios in south-west London, in January 1969. The film project, which became known as Get Back and eventually Let It Be, formed part of the band's proposed return to live performance for the first time since their 1966 North American tour. Harrison said that after coming back from Woodstock in December 1968, he was "quite optimistic" about the new project, especially the plan to return to a more ensemble-based approach to playing. (Note: In addition to his time with the Band, Harrison had enjoyed jamming with musicians in Los Angeles during the sessions for Is This What You Want?, an album by Jackie Lomax that Harrison produced for the Beatles' Apple record label. These session musicians included members of the Wrecking Crew such as Hal Blaine and Larry Knechtel.) The rehearsals were filmed and recorded by director Michael Lindsay-Hogg with the intention that the documentary film would accompany a televised concert by the Beatles.

Harrison presented an early draft of the song on 7 January, during a day marked by acrimony within the group. In their study of the tapes from the Get Back project, authors Doug Sulpy and Ray Schweighardt write that the Beatles rehearsed "For You Blue" half-heartedly, amid heated discussions about their future and with Harrison in disagreement with McCartney over the proposed concert. Adding to Harrison's dissatisfaction since the start of the Twickenham rehearsals, his compositions "All Things Must Pass", "Let It Down" and "Hear Me Lord" had received little enthusiasm from Lennon and McCartney. The Beatles returned to "For You Blue" on 9 January, by which time Harrison had completed the lyrics. He suggested that the song required an acoustic arrangement akin to skiffle or, citing slide guitarist Son House as an example, traditional country blues. The following day, Harrison walked out of the sessions, weary of what he considered to be McCartney's overbearing attitude and Lennon's lack of engagement with the project.

== Production ==
=== Recording ===
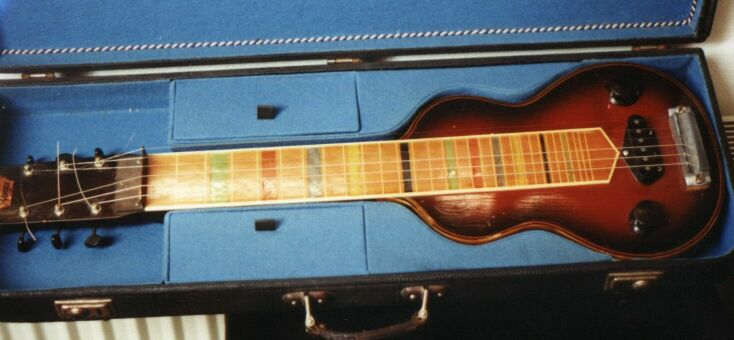
A lap steel guitar. The song features Lennon soloing on a Höfner Hawaiian Standard lap steel.

As a condition of Harrison's return to the group, the Beatles abandoned the idea of a concert and relocated to their Apple Studio in central London, on 22 January, to record an album of some of the songs rehearsed at Twickenham. Until Lindsay-Hogg chose to include footage relating to "I Me Mine" in the documentary, necessitating a formal recording of that song in January 1970, "For You Blue" was the only Harrison composition recorded for the album. Music critic John Harris remarks on the surprising decision to include "For You Blue", in light of the more substantial compositions that Harrison had presented. Like Harris, author Elliot Huntley considers that Harrison deliberately refrained from pushing for the inclusion of his best material, believing that his bandmates would not do justice to songs such as "All Things Must Pass", "Let It Down" and the similarly overlooked "Isn't It a Pity" and "Something". (Note: Harris describes this situation as one that "speaks volumes about George's predicament" over 1968–69, when Harrison's output as a songwriter had outgrown his junior status to Lennon and McCartney. While Everett considers that the songs submitted by Harrison throughout January 1969 were "far more interesting" than Lennon's, Sulpy and Schweighardt write that Lennon and McCartney routinely rejected Harrison's contributions "even though some were far better than their own".)

The session for "For You Blue" took place at Apple on 25 January, with Glyn Johns and George Martin sharing the role of producer. According to Sulpy and Schweighardt, the band played the song with a "complete focus" that contrasted with their indecisive approach that day when working on McCartney's "Let It Be" and "Two of Us". With regard to Harrison's suggestion for a light acoustic arrangement on "For You Blue", Sulpy and Schweighardt describe the group's performance as being closer to the urban blues style.

Take 6 was selected as the master take. The recording features Harrison on acoustic guitar and Lennon playing lap steel guitar. Lennon performs the first solo over the instrumental break, after which McCartney plays a piano solo. According to various commentators, Lennon used either a cigarette lighter, a shotgun shell, or the standard slide that came with the Höfner lap steel. To achieve Harrison's request for a "bad honky tonk piano" sound, Martin and McCartney intertwined newspaper between the strings of the piano. (Note: While neither Ian MacDonald nor Kenneth Womack list a bass guitar part in their respective credits for the track, Harrison said in a 1987 interview with Creem that McCartney also played bass. Author Simon Leng credits Harrison for the bassline, performed on acoustic guitar.) Ringo Starr contributed a drum part that, in Everett's description, provides a "heavy backbeat" throughout the performance.

=== Overdubbing and mixing ===
After the film project was revived in January 1970, for a proposed cinema release under the new title of Let It Be, Harrison chose to re-record his lead vocal for the track. With Johns producing the session, Harrison overdubbed the vocal part at Olympic Sound Studios in south-west London on 8 January. Harrison's ad-libbed comments during the instrumental breaks – including "Go, Johnny, go!" and a reference to Mississippi bluesman Elmore James – originated from this session also. (Note: When recording the song at Apple, Harrison had included a mention of the group's Blüthner piano as McCartney played his solo.)

When Phil Spector remixed "For You Blue" for inclusion on the Let It Be album, on 30 March 1970, he added a spoken introduction by Lennon in the style of a newspaper headline: "Queen Says 'No' to Pot-Smoking FBI Member." This comment was edited in from dialogue recorded at Twickenham Film Studios on 8 January 1969. Described by Beatles historian Mark Lewisohn as a "most interesting" idea, Spector created a tape loop of the song's instrumental break over which he inserted other items of dialogue from the film, including contrasting reactions from members of the public to the Beatles' Apple rooftop concert on 30 January 1969. The tape was possibly intended to help promote Let It Be but never released. Despite Johns' extensive contribution, Lennon denied him a producer's credit on the album, which was instead credited to Spector.

== Release ==
Apple Records issued Let It Be on 8 May 1970 with "For You Blue" sequenced as the penultimate track, between "The Long and Winding Road" and "Get Back". The release came four weeks after the Beatles' break-up and shortly before the premiere of the Let It Be documentary film. The song's appearance in the film signalled the change of location for the troubled Get Back project, from Twickenham to Apple Studio.

The song was selected as the B-side to "The Long and Winding Road", a single released in the United States on 11 May, but not issued in Britain. In the US, "For You Blue" gained sufficient radio airplay for Billboard to list the two songs together, as a double-sided hit, when the record topped the magazine's Hot 100 chart. The release was similarly treated as a double A-side when it topped Canada's singles chart and peaked at number 6 on Australia's Go-Set national chart. On the US listings compiled by Cash Box, which continued to monitor single-sides individually, "For You Blue" peaked at number 71.

"For You Blue" was one of Harrison's most successful songs on the Billboard charts, both as a member of the Beatles and as a solo artist. In 1976, it was among the seven Beatles tracks that Capitol Records selected for inclusion on the compilation The Best of George Harrison. Recognising that its status as a US chart-topper was due to Billboard's policy at the time, however, Apple did not include the track on the Beatles' 1 compilation, released in 2000.

The first take of "For You Blue" from the 25 January 1969 session was released on the Beatles' Anthology 3 compilation in 1996. The edit of the song as used in the Let It Be film – a composite of takes 9 and 6 – was issued as a promotional video for the compilation. A new mix of this film version was included on the Anthology DVD in 2003. That same year, a remix of the original album track, without the introductory dialogue added by Spector, was issued on the album Let It Be… Naked.

== Critical reception ==
Among contemporary reviews of Let It Be, Alan Smith of the NME described "For You Blue" as "another strong one from George, a whispery chunky rocker ...'Elmore James,' he calls out at one point, 'got nothin' on this baby!'" Melody Maker's Richard Williams considered it to be "an amusing trifle", citing Lennon's "camped-down bottleneck guitar" and the reference to James. Less impressed, John Gabree of High Fidelity magazine found the lap-steel playing the only point of interest on an "otherwise boring" track.

In a 2003 review for Mojo, John Harris highlighted "For You Blue" as one of the tracks that remained true to McCartney's original concept for a "return to the group's beginnings" with the Get Back project. Harris admired the song's "mesh of piano, acoustic guitar and lap steel" as "quietly wonderful". Writing in Acoustic Guitar magazine that same year, David Simons said that, along with other "standout"s such as "Here Comes the Sun" and "I Me Mine", "For You Blue" exemplified Harrison's creativity as a rhythm guitarist and introduced a new element to the band's sound, through the composition's origins on capo-ed acoustic guitar.

Among Beatles biographers, Ian MacDonald dismisses the song as a "forgettable twelve-bar", while Mark Hertsgaard terms it "a slight blues boogie" and considers that Harrison would have been better served on the album by the superior "All Things Must Pass" and "Let It Down". Walter Everett writes that the "promise" offered in Harrison's acoustic guitar introduction remains unfulfilled, such that the principal interest lies in "Lennon's only lap-steel performance with the Beatles, one that seems both clumsy and polished at the same time". Ian Inglis welcomes the song's lightheartedness as evidence that, amid Harrison's usual preoccupation with spirituality and enlightenment, he was nevertheless able to produce "an uncomplicated and enjoyable love song". Inglis concludes: "Its directness, and his obvious enjoyment, reinforce the sincerity of his words." Music journalist Kit O'Toole recognises "For You Blue" as an example of a Beatles B-side that was "just as good, if not better" than the single's lead side. While remarking on the contrast between the song's upbeat and optimistic qualities and the tense atmosphere within the band in January 1969, O'Toole likens the performance to "the four sitting in a living room, just jamming for fun".

Like Harris, Justin Gerber of Consequence of Sound considers "For You Blue" to be in keeping with the group's intended back-to-basics approach, although he pairs it with "I Me Mine" as Harrison compositions that are "not bad, but pale in comparison to his offerings on [the White Album]". Pitchfork's Mark Richardson admires the song's "prickly rhythmic drive" and groups it with tracks such as "Two of Us" and "Get Back" as examples of how Let It Be still contains quality material even though "little ... feels consequential to the Beatles' legacy".

== Live performances and cover versions ==
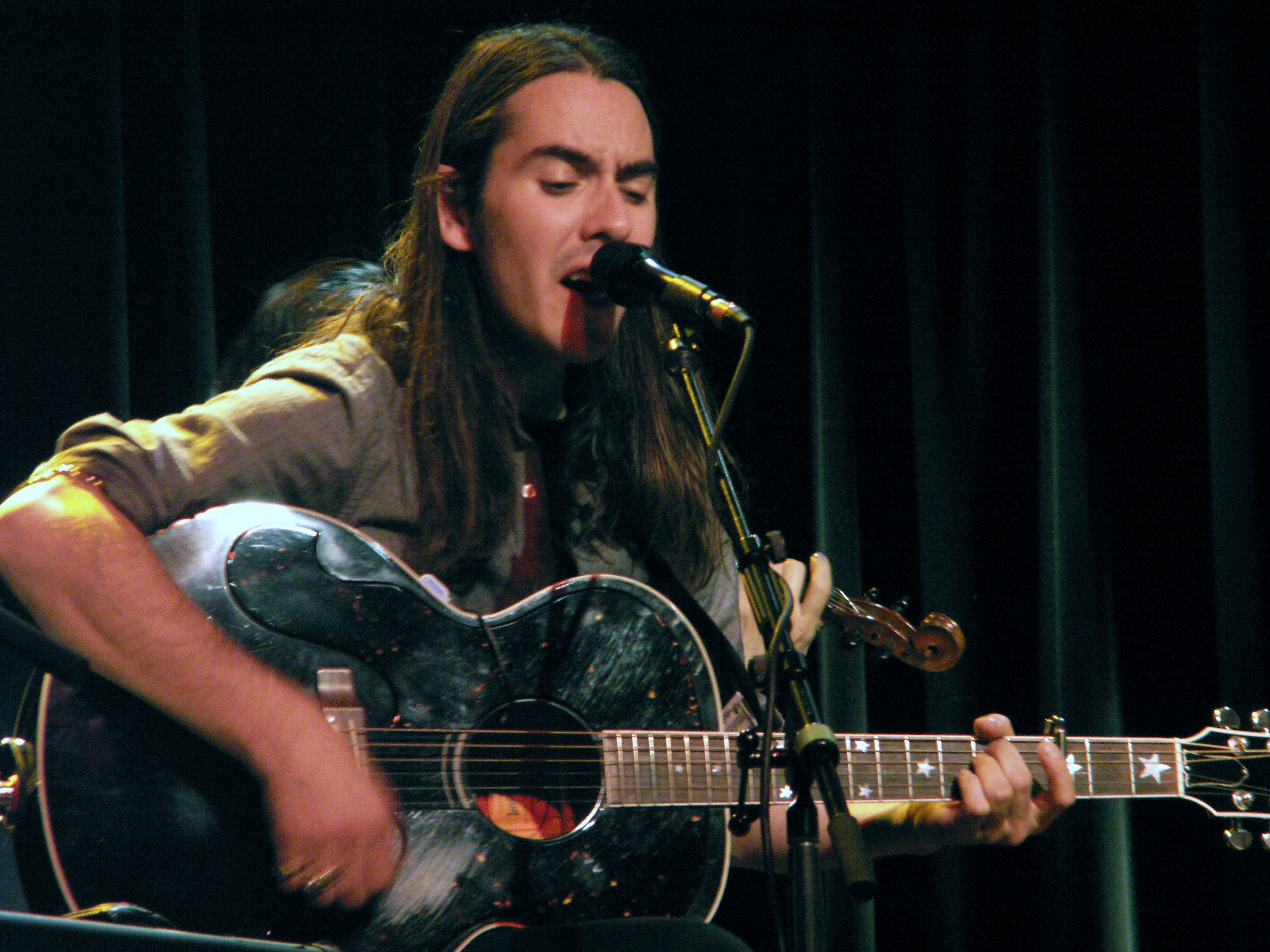
Dhani Harrison (pictured in 2010) was among the musicians who performed "For You Blue" with McCartney at the Concert for George in 2002. He also recorded a cover of the track in 2013.

"For You Blue" was part of Harrison's set on his Dark Horse Tour of North America in 1974. Harrison performed the song as a jam track during which he introduced the musicians in his tour band. A live version, featuring solos by Robben Ford, Emil Richards and Willie Weeks – on guitar, percussive bells and bass, respectively – appeared on the disc accompanying Songs by George Harrison, a limited-edition illustrated book published by Genesis Publications in 1988.

On 29 November 2002, McCartney sang "For You Blue" at the Concert for George, held at the Royal Albert Hall in London on the first anniversary of Harrison's death. McCartney was backed by a large band that included Starr, Clapton, and Harrison's son, Dhani, with Marc Mann playing slide guitar.

Pete Molinari covered the song for Mojo's Let It Be Revisited CD, included with the October 2010 issue of the magazine. In 2013, Dhani Harrison recorded "For You Blue" as a charity release in aid of the Christopher and Dana Reeve Foundation, a project supported by the Harrison family's Material World Charitable Foundation. Dhani was accompanied by Blake Mills, Aaron Embry and Jim Keltner, the last of whom also played drums on Harrison's 1974 live version of the song and on McCartney's performance in 2002.

== Personnel ==
According to Ian MacDonald:

- George Harrison – lead vocal, acoustic guitar
- John Lennon – lap steel guitar
- Paul McCartney – piano
- Ringo Starr – drums

== Chart positions ==
Chart (1970)	Peak position
Australian Go-Set National Top 60	6
Canadian MLS Singles	1
US Billboard Hot 100	1
US Cash Box Top 100	71

== Sources ==
- Badman, Keith (2001). The Beatles Diary Volume 2: After the Break-Up 1970–2001. London: Omnibus Press. ISBN 978-0-7119-8307-6.
- The Beatles (2000). The Beatles Anthology. San Francisco, CA: Chronicle Books. ISBN 0-8118-2684-8.
- Castleman, Harry; Podrazik, Walter J. (1976). All Together Now: The First Complete Beatles Discography 1961–1975. New York, NY: Ballantine Books. ISBN 0-345-25680-8.
- Clayson, Alan (2003). George Harrison. London: Sanctuary. ISBN 1-86074-489-3.
- Doggett, Peter (2011). You Never Give Me Your Money: The Beatles After the Breakup. New York, NY: It Books. ISBN 978-0-06-177418-8.
- The Editors of Rolling Stone (2002). Harrison. New York, NY: Rolling Stone Press. ISBN 978-0-7432-3581-5.
- Everett, Walter (1999). The Beatles as Musicians: Revolver Through the Anthology. New York, NY: Oxford University Press. ISBN 0-19-512941-5.
- Guesdon, Jean-Michel; Margotin, Philippe (2013). All the Songs: The Story Behind Every Beatles Release. New York, NY: Black Dog & Leventhal. ISBN 978-1-57912-952-1.
- Harrison, George (2002). I, Me, Mine. San Francisco, CA: Chronicle Books. ISBN 978-0-8118-5900-4.
- Hertsgaard, Mark (1996). A Day in the Life: The Music and Artistry of the Beatles. London: Pan Books. ISBN 0-330-33891-9.
- Hoffmann, Frank (1983). The Cash Box Singles Charts, 1950–1981. Metuchen, NJ: The Scarecrow Press. ISBN 978-0-8108-1595-7.
- Huntley, Elliot J. (2006). Mystical One: George Harrison – After the Break-up of the Beatles. Toronto, ON: Guernica Editions. ISBN 1-55071-197-0.
- Inglis, Ian (2010). The Words and Music of George Harrison. Santa Barbara, CA: Praeger. ISBN 978-0-313-37532-3.
- Leng, Simon (2006). While My Guitar Gently Weeps: The Music of George Harrison. Milwaukee, WI: Hal Leonard. ISBN 978-1-4234-0609-9.
- Lewisohn, Mark (2005) [1988]. The Complete Beatles Recording Sessions: The Official Story of the Abbey Road Years 1962–1970. London: Bounty Books. ISBN 978-0-7537-2545-0.
- MacDonald, Ian (2005). Revolution in the Head: The Beatles' Records and the Sixties (2nd rev. edn). Chicago, IL: Chicago Review Press. ISBN 978-1-55652-733-3.
- Madinger, Chip; Easter, Mark (2000). Eight Arms to Hold You: The Solo Beatles Compendium. Chesterfield, MO: 44.1 Productions. ISBN 0-615-11724-4.
- Miles, Barry (2001). The Beatles Diary Volume 1: The Beatles Years. London: Omnibus Press. ISBN 0-7119-8308-9.
- O'Gorman, Martin (2003). "Film on Four". Mojo Special Limited Edition: 1000 Days of Revolution (The Beatles' Final Years – Jan 1, 1968 to Sept 27, 1970). London: Emap. pp. 68–75.
- Pedler, Dominic (2003). The Songwriting Secrets of the Beatles. London: Omnibus Press. ISBN 978-0-7119-8167-6.
- Rowley, David (2013). All Together Now: The ABC of The Beatles' Songs and Albums. Leicester, UK: Troubadour Publishing. ISBN 978-1-78088-440-0.
- Spizer, Bruce (2003). The Beatles on Apple Records. New Orleans, LA: 498 Productions. ISBN 0-9662649-4-0.
- Sulpy, Doug; Schweighardt, Ray (1999). Get Back: The Unauthorized Chronicle of the Beatles' Let It Be Disaster. New York, NY: St. Martin's Griffin. ISBN 0-312-19981-3.
- Winn, John C. (2009). That Magic Feeling: The Beatles' Recorded Legacy, Volume Two, 1966–1970. New York, NY: Three Rivers Press. ISBN 978-0-307-45239-9.
- Womack, Kenneth (2014). The Beatles Encyclopedia: Everything Fab Four. Santa Barbara, CA: ABC-CLIO. ISBN 978-0-313-39171-2.
