= James Apollo =

American singer, bandleader and producer

- Born: December 25, 1982 (age 43); Northwest Arkansas
- Genres: blues, soul, indie rock
- Instruments: vocals, guitar, piano
- Label: Marterry
- Website: jamesapollo.com

James Apollo (born December 25, 1982) is an American singer, bandleader and producer. He was born in Northwest Arkansas and spent formative years in Minneapolis, San Francisco, New York City and Tennessee. He currently lives and works out of Los Angeles.

The Scotsman dubbed Apollo "King of the Road", in regards to a young life of touring. He is best known for creating emotionally textured soundscapes, often gaining musical and lyrical citations to William Faulkner, Tom Waits, and classic sounds of the West. According to Allmusic, "Apollo's broken, bluesy tenor moans out his tale of broken hearts and substance abuse". His songs have been featured in a number of independent films, including the feature, "Sun Dogs" and award winning film 38 témoins

== Members ==
Current

- James Apollo – vocals
- Jack Chandelier – percussion
- Matt Palin – bass
- Ben Obee – bass, vocals
- John Thomlinson – organ
- Lauren Trew – reeds
- Scott Morning – brass

== Background ==
After touring the USA for several years, Apollo was picked up by Marterry Records, which released the debut, "Til Your Feet Bleed."

First touring Europe with then Brooklyn band Grizzly Bear, James Apollo was invited by Tom Robinson to perform live on the BBC. This led to numerous radio appearances, and a live television session on Channel M in Manchester, gaining the singer a wide audience throughout the UK. He has since continued performing in both the United States and the UK.

Apollo released his UK debut album Till Your Feet Bleed on the Marterry label. The album gained positive reaction from the press. Mojo awarded the album four (out of five) stars. "A record that's shrouded in nocturnal melancholy, the singer-songwriter presiding over its dark delights with both a ghoulish air of danger and a charming fragility". Uncut also gave it four out of five stars. "You could accuse him of over-emoting, but there's something intrinsically beautiful in how accordion, guitar and brushed drums are woven together to such doleful, quietly epic effect".

Apollo also contributed the track "One After 909" to Mojo's recreation of The Beatles record Let It Be album, given away free with the September 2010 edition of the magazine.

Apollo then recorded the vinyl only, "Angels we have Grown apart" which features a number of prominent New York musicians such as members of Antibalas Clifton Hyde, Stefan Zeniuk, and Jesse Selengut.

James Apollo began working with acclaimed indie artist Damien Jurado who produced the record "Little War, Little Less" which was recorded at the famous Bear Creek Studio in Washington's Cascade Mountains. The album's single "Blessed or Bust" reached No. 17 on the UK singles chart.

Always an eccentric supporter of music in film, James Apollo was tapped to contribute sounds to 2013's award winning film The Notebook, which showcased some of the artist's epicly dark soundscapes.

In 2019 James Apollo released "Beat the Mark Inside", a record Clash described as "Strident and passionate, with a full throat and a belly full of fury." It was after this release that James Apollo was invited to tour with LA based Lord Huron, a move which brought Apollo's material to an entirely new audience.

Danger Mouse (musician) is currently working with James Apollo on his next release.
