= Let It Be... Naked =

Remix album by the Beatles
- Released: 17 November 2003
- Recorded: 4 February 1968, 2–31 January 1969, 3 January 1970
- Venues: Apple Corps rooftop, London
- Studios: Apple, EMI and Twickenham, London
- Genres: Rock; blues
- Length: 34:49
- Labels: Apple; Parlophone; Capitol
- Producers: Paul Hicks; Guy Massey; Allan Rouse

The Beatles chronology
1 (2000)	Let It Be... Naked (2003)	The Capitol Albums, Volume 1 (2004)

Let It Be... Naked is an alternative mix of the Beatles' 1970 album Let It Be, released on 17 November 2003 by Apple Records. The project was initiated by Paul McCartney, who felt that the original album's producer, Phil Spector, did not capture the group's stripped-down, live-to-tape aesthetic intended for the album. Naked consists largely of newly mixed versions of the Let It Be tracks while omitting the excerpts of incidental studio chatter and most of Spector's embellishments. It also omits two tracks from the 1970 release – "Dig It" and "Maggie Mae" – replacing them with "Don't Let Me Down", which was the non-album B-side of the "Get Back" single.

== Background ==
The album is presented in a form which Paul McCartney considered closer to its original artistic vision: to "get back" to the rock and roll sound of their early years rather than the orchestral overdubs and embellishments which were added by Phil Spector to three of the songs in the production of the final Let It Be album. McCartney in particular was always dissatisfied with Spector's mixes of these three tracks, especially for the song "The Long and Winding Road". George Harrison gave his approval for the Naked project before he died.

McCartney's attitude contrasted with Lennon's from his December 1970 interview with Rolling Stone magazine. Lennon had defended Spector's work, saying, "He was given the shittiest load of badly recorded shit – and with a lousy feeling to it – ever. And he made something out of it ... When I heard it, I didn't puke." Harrison and Ringo Starr also remained complimentary about Spector's contribution, Starr saying: "I like what Phil did … There's no point bringing him in if you're not going to like the way he does it".

== Differences ==
Two songs that had been included on the original album – the traditional Liverpool folk song "Maggie Mae" and the improvisational piece "Dig It" – were excised, as they "were fine for a soundtrack album ... but they didn't fit comfortably with the concept of a straight album", according to album remixer Allan Rouse. Lennon's "Don't Let Me Down" was added to the running order, although Naked features a composite edit of the two versions from the rooftop concert, rather than the version featured as the B-side to the "Get Back" single. "I've Got a Feeling" was also presented in a new composite edit of its two rooftop-concert takes. On "The Long and Winding Road", the Naked producers used the final take, recorded five days after the rough run-through Spector had selected for the original album.

Track-by-track details

- "Get Back" – a remix of the take recorded on 27 January 1969 used for both the single and album; without the coda recorded on 28 January featured in the single version or framing dialogue from the studio and rooftop concert added to the album version.
- "Dig a Pony" – a remix of the take from the rooftop concert on 30 January 1969; framing dialogue and false start removed; error in second chorus (the "because" in Lennon's vocal track) digitally corrected.
- "For You Blue" – a remix of the 25 January 1969 take used on the album, including Harrison's re-recorded lead vocal from 8 January 1970 and reinstating his rhythm guitar; framing dialogue removed.
- "The Long and Winding Road" – the final take recorded on 31 January 1969, instead of the album take from 26 January. Previously unreleased.
- "Two of Us" – a remix of the take recorded on 31 January 1969 used on the album; framing dialogue removed; minor error in Lennon's acoustic guitar performance digitally corrected.
- "I've Got a Feeling" – a composite edit of two takes from the rooftop concert.
- "One After 909" – a remix of the take from the rooftop concert; final impromptu rendition of "Danny Boy" removed.
- "Don't Let Me Down" – a composite edit of two takes from the rooftop concert. Previously unreleased.
- "I Me Mine" – a remixed, slightly different recreation of Spector's edit (which had increased the track's length by copy/pasting the second chorus at the end) of the track recorded on 3 January 1970; orchestra removed, guitar overdubs and organ parts mixed in and out to make the repeated verse sound different.
- "Across the Universe" – a remix of the original version recorded on 4 February 1968, without speed/pitch alteration, sound effects, piano, maracas and backing vocals; with echo effects unique to this version.
- "Let It Be" – a remix of take 27A from 31 January 1969 used for George Martin's single version and Spector's album version, with edit pieces including Harrison's guitar solo from take 27B edited in.

== Release ==
On 13 November 2003, the completed Let It Be... Naked album had its world premiere with a two-hour radio special from Infinity Broadcasting. The special featured: a 50-minute documentary of the original Get Back/Let It Be sessions, including interviews with all four Beatles; an uninterrupted broadcast of the new Let It Be... Naked album; and a 20-minute roundtable discussion hosted by Pat O'Brien. The roundtable discussion featured analysis from musicians Sheryl Crow, J.C. Chasez, Billy Joel, and Fred Durst, record producers Alan Parsons and Jimmy Iovine, music critic David Fricke, journalist Geraldo Rivera and Breakfast with the Beatles host Chris Carter.

== Reception ==
Professional ratings
Aggregate scores
Source	Rating
Metacritic	68/100
Review scores
Source	Rating
AllMusic	4/5 stars
The Encyclopedia of Popular Music	4/5 stars
The Guardian	3/5 stars
Pitchfork	7.0/10
Rolling Stone	3/5 stars

AllMusic's Rovi Staff writes: 'Let It Be... Naked sets the record straight, revisiting the contentious sessions (... and) enhances the album's power, reclaiming the raw, unadorned quality that was meant to be its calling card from the beginning.' Dominique Leone of Pitchfork called the album "not essential ... though immaculately presented". Anthony DeCurtis of Rolling Stone noted that "[while] the sonic improvements to the album as a whole are undeniable ... novices should still get the original". Producer Rick Rubin said he had "mixed feelings"; although excited about a new Beatles release and especially the sound of "Two of Us", he expressed admiration for the original Phil Spector production that Let It Be... Naked stripped out, especially on "The Long and Winding Road".

Adam Sweeting of The Guardian commented: "Technically, they've done a fine job ... it may be intriguing to hear a version of 'Across the Universe' featuring only Lennon and some echo effects, but the new mix merely emphasises the song's droning vapidity. 'The Long and Winding Road' is indubitably improved by the removal of Spector's wall of schmaltz, but it's still teeth-clenchingly mawkish". Salon's Thomas Bartlett lamented that Let It Be... Naked "stripped the original album of both John's sense of humour and Phil Spector's wacky, and at least slightly tongue-in-cheek, grandiosity".

== Track listing ==
All tracks are written by Lennon–McCartney except "For You Blue" and "I Me Mine", which were written by George Harrison.

Side one
No.	Title	Lead vocals	Length
1.	"Get Back"	McCartney	2:34
2.	"Dig a Pony"	Lennon	3:38
3.	"For You Blue"	Harrison	2:27
4.	"The Long and Winding Road"	McCartney	3:34
5.	"Two of Us"	McCartney with Lennon	3:20
6.	"I've Got a Feeling"	McCartney and Lennon	3:30
Total length:			19:07

Side two
No.	Title	Lead vocals	Length
1.	"One After 909"	Lennon with McCartney	2:44
2.	"Don't Let Me Down"	Lennon	3:18
3.	"I Me Mine"	Harrison	2:21
4.	"Across the Universe"	Lennon	3:38
5.	"Let It Be"	McCartney	3:55
Total length:			15:58

All songs published by Northern Songs, except tracks 3 and 9 published by Harrisongs.

=== Fly on the Wall bonus disc ===
The 22-minute bonus disc contains song excerpts and dialogue from the many hours of tape which accumulated during the Let It Be sessions. Some of the removed dialogue that had appeared on the original album appears on this disc. In total, the track is 21 minutes and 55 seconds long and brings the album's total length to 56:59.

Compiled and edited by Kevin Howlett. All songs credited to Lennon–McCartney except where noted.

Side three

- "Sun King" – 0:17
- "Don't Let Me Down" – 0:35
- "One After 909"– 0:09
- "Because I Know You Love Me So" – 1:32
- "Don't Pass Me By" (Richard Starkey) – 0:03
- "Taking a Trip to Carolina" (Starkey) – 0:19
- "John's Piano Piece" (Lennon) – 0:18
- "Child of Nature" (Lennon) – 0:24
- "Back in the U.S.S.R." – 0:09
- "Every Little Thing" – 0:09
- "Don't Let Me Down" – 1:01
- "All Things Must Pass" (Harrison) – 0:21

Side four

- "She Came In Through the Bathroom Window" – 0:05
- "Paul's Piano Piece" (McCartney) – 1:01
- "Get Back" – 0:15
- "Two of Us" – 0:22
- "Maggie Mae" (Traditional, arranged by Lennon–McCartney–Harrison–Starkey) – 0:22
- "Fancy My Chances with You" – 0:27
- "Can You Dig It?" (Lennon–McCartney–Harrison–Starkey) – 0:31
- "Get Back" – 0:32

The album was released in some regions with the Copy Control protection system.

== Personnel ==
The Beatles

- John Lennon – vocals, guitars, six-string bass guitar, lap steel guitar
- Paul McCartney – vocals, bass guitar, piano, acoustic guitars, electric piano, Hammond organ
- George Harrison – guitars, vocals, sitar, tambura
- Ringo Starr – drums

Additional musicians

- George Martin – Hammond organ
- Linda McCartney – backing vocals
- Billy Preston – electric piano, Hammond organ

Technical

- Paul Hicks – co-producer, mixing
- Guy Massey – co-producer, mixing
- Allan Rouse – co-producer, mixing
- Steve Rooke – mastering
- The Beatles – co-producer (original recordings)
- George Martin – co-producer (original recordings)
- Glyn Johns – engineer
- Ethan Russell – photography
- Wherefore Art? – design
- Kevin Howlett – liner notes, compilation and editing (Fly on the Wall)
- Brian Thompson – technical assistance (Fly on the Wall)

== Charts ==
=== Weekly charts ===
Weekly chart performance for Let It Be... Naked
Chart (2003–04)	Peak position
Australian Albums (ARIA)	11
Austrian Albums (Ö3 Austria)	8
Belgian Albums (Ultratop Flanders)	13
Belgian Albums (Ultratop Wallonia)	33
Canadian Albums (Billboard)	8
Danish Albums (Hitlisten)	5
Dutch Albums (Album Top 100)	8
Finnish Albums (Suomen virallinen lista)	35
French Albums (SNEP)	14
German Albums (Offizielle Top 100)	13
Irish Albums (IRMA)	7
Italian Albums (FIMI)	6
Norwegian Albums (VG-lista)	6
New Zealand Albums (RMNZ)	23
Portuguese Albums (AFP)	29
Swedish Albums (Sverigetopplistan)	2
Swiss Albums (Schweizer Hitparade)	21
UK Albums (Official Charts)	7
US Billboard 200	5

2013 chart performance for Let It Be... Naked
Chart (2013)	Peak position
Belgian Albums (Ultratop Flanders)	43
Belgian Albums (Ultratop Wallonia)	75
Danish Albums (Hitlisten)	40
Dutch Albums (Album Top 100)	49
French Albums (SNEP)	142
Italian Albums (FIMI)	63
Norwegian Albums (VG-lista)	23
UK Albums (Official Charts)	95
US Billboard 200	32

=== Year-end charts ===
2003 year-end chart performance for Let It Be... Naked
Chart (2003)	Position
Dutch Albums (Album Top 100)	97
Swedish Albums (Sverigetopplistan)	37
UK Albums (OCC)	81
Worldwide Albums (IFPI)	24

2004 year-end chart performance for Let It Be... Naked
Chart (2004)	Position
US Billboard 200	56

== Certifications ==
Certifications and sales for Let It Be... Naked
Region	Certification	Certified units/sales
Australia (ARIA)	Gold	35,000^{^}
Germany (BVMI)	Gold	100,000^{^}
Japan (RIAJ)	2× Platinum	500,000^{^}
Spain (Promusicae)	Gold	50,000^{^}
Sweden (GLF)	Gold	30,000^{^}
United Kingdom (BPI)	Gold	100,000^{^}
United States (RIAA)	Platinum	1,211,000
^{^} Shipments figures based on certification alone.

== See also ==
- Outline of the Beatles
- The Beatles timeline
