= Anthology 3 =

Compilation album by the Beatles
- Released: 28 October 1996
- Recorded: 28 May 1968 – 3 January 1970 (except 22 February 1967 for the final chord of "A Day in the Life")
- Studios: EMI Studios and Apple Studios, London
- Genre: Rock
- Length: 145:33
- Labels: Apple, Capitol
- Producer: George Martin

The Beatles chronology
Anthology 2 (1996)	Anthology 3 (1996)	Yellow Submarine Songtrack (1999)

Professional ratings
Review scores
Source	Rating
AllMusic	4/5 stars
Robert Christgau	(choice cut)
The Encyclopedia of Popular Music	3/5 stars
Entertainment Weekly	B
MusicHound	3/5
Q	4/5 stars
Rolling Stone	4/5 stars
The Rolling Stone Album Guide	3/5 stars

Anthology 3 is a compilation album by the Beatles, released on 28 October 1996 by Apple Records as part of The Beatles Anthology series. The album includes rarities and alternative tracks from the final two years of the band's career, ranging from the initial sessions for The Beatles (better known as "the White Album") to the last sessions for Let It Be and Abbey Road in 1969 and early 1970. It is the third in a quartet of albums with Anthology 1 and Anthology 2, and Anthology 4, all of which tie in with the televised special The Beatles Anthology.

The album was certified 3× Platinum by the RIAA and was the group's third double album in a row to reach number one on the US charts, equalling a record set by Donna Summer in the 1970s.

The Anthology albums were remastered and made available digitally on the iTunes Store on 14 June 2011, individually and as part of the Anthology Collection box set.

== Content ==
Following "Free as a Bird" on Anthology 1 and "Real Love" on Anthology 2, a third John Lennon solo demo entitled "Now and Then" was to be reworked by the three surviving members of The Beatles (George Harrison, Paul McCartney and Ringo Starr) for Anthology 3. However, this project was shelved due to Harrison's dislike of the quality of the song recording. McCartney later stated that Harrison called Lennon's demo recording "fucking rubbish". McCartney told Q Magazine in 1997 that "George didn't like it. The Beatles being a democracy, we didn't do it." The song would eventually be finished and released in 2023. In its place is "A Beginning", an orchestral instrumental track by the band's producer George Martin, initially intended for the White Album as the intro to "Don't Pass Me By".

Connecting to the previous Anthology albums, the cover image painted by Klaus Voormann features a collage of Beatles-related imagery designed to appear as a wall of peeling posters and album covers. An updated picture of Voormann can be seen in Harrison's hair in a segment of the Revolver album cover.

== Track listing ==
All tracks in stereo, except where noted.

All tracks are written by Lennon–McCartney, except where noted.

Disc one
No.	Title	Writer(s)	Recording date and location	Length
1.	"A Beginning" (instrumental)	George Martin	22 July 1968 EMI Studios, London, UK	0:50
2.	"Happiness Is a Warm Gun" (home demo; mono)		28 May 1968 Kinfauns, Esher, UK	2:15
3.	"Helter Skelter" (Take 2 edited; mono)		18 July 1968 EMI Studios	4:38
4.	"Mean Mr. Mustard" (home demo)		29 May 1968 Kinfauns	1:58
5.	"Polythene Pam" (home demo)		29 May 1968 Kinfauns	1:26
6.	"Glass Onion" (home demo)		28 May 1968 Kinfauns	1:51
7.	"Junk" (home demo)	Paul McCartney	28 May 1968 Kinfauns	2:25
8.	"Piggies" (home demo; mono)	George Harrison	28 May 1968 Kinfauns	2:01
9.	"Honey Pie" (home demo)		28 May 1968 Kinfauns	1:19
10.	"Don't Pass Me By" (Takes 3 & 5)	Richard Starkey	5–6 June 1968 EMI Studios	2:42
11.	"Ob-La-Di, Ob-La-Da" (Take 5)		3–5 July 1968 EMI Studios	2:56
12.	"Good Night" (Takes 22 & 34)		28 June & 22 July 1968 EMI Studios	2:38
13.	"Cry Baby Cry" (Take 1)		16 July 1968 EMI Studios	2:46
14.	"Blackbird" (Take 4)		11 June 1968 EMI Studios	2:19
15.	"Sexy Sadie" (Take 6)		19 July 1968 EMI Studios	4:07
16.	"While My Guitar Gently Weeps" (Acoustic Version: Take 1)	Harrison	25 July 1968 EMI Studios	3:28
17.	"Hey Jude" (Take 2)		29 July 1968 EMI Studios	4:21
18.	"Not Guilty" (Take 102)	Harrison	8–9 & 12 August 1968 EMI Studios	3:22
19.	"Mother Nature's Son" (Take 2)		9 August 1968 EMI Studios	3:17
20.	"Glass Onion" (original mono mix)		11–13, 16 & 26 September 1968 EMI Studios	2:08
21.	"Rocky Raccoon" (Take 8)		15 August 1968 EMI Studios	4:13
22.	"What's the New Mary Jane" (Take 4)		14 August 1968 & 26 November 1969 EMI Studios	6:12
23.	"Step Inside Love / Los Paranoias" (jam)	John Lennon; McCartney / Lennon; McCartney; Harrison; Starkey	16 September 1968 EMI Studios	2:31
24.	"I'm So Tired" (Takes 3, 6 & 9)		8 October 1968 EMI Studios	2:14
25.	"I Will" (Take 1)		16 September 1968 EMI Studios	1:55
26.	"Why Don't We Do It in the Road?" (Take 4; mono)		9 October 1968 EMI Studios	2:15
27.	"Julia" (Take 2)		13 October 1968 EMI Studios	1:58
Total length:				74:05

Disc two
No.	Title	Writer(s)	Recording date and location	Length
1.	"I've Got a Feeling" (Savile Row sessions)		23 January 1969 Apple Studio, Savile Row, London	2:49
2.	"She Came In Through the Bathroom Window" (Savile Row sessions)		22 January 1969 Apple Studio	3:37
3.	"Dig a Pony" (Savile Row sessions)		22 January 1969 Apple Studio	4:18
4.	"Two of Us" (Savile Row sessions)		24 January 1969 Apple Studio	3:27
5.	"For You Blue" (Take 1)	Harrison	25 January 1969 Apple Studio	2:23
6.	"Teddy Boy" (Savile Row sessions)	McCartney	24 & 28 January 1969 Apple Studio	3:18
7.	"Medley: Rip It Up / Shake, Rattle and Roll / Blue Suede Shoes" (Savile Row sessions)	Robert Blackwell; John Marascalco / Charles Calhoun / Carl Perkins	26 January 1969 Apple Studio	3:11
8.	"The Long and Winding Road" (Savile Row sessions; master track with Phil Spector alterations removed)		26 January 1969 Apple Studio	3:42
9.	"Oh! Darling" (Savile Row sessions)		27 January 1969 Apple Studio	4:07
10.	"All Things Must Pass" (demo)	Harrison	25 February 1969 EMI Studios	3:05
11.	"Mailman, Bring Me No More Blues" (Savile Row sessions)	Ruth Roberts; Bill Katz; Stanley Clayton	29 January 1969 Apple Studio	1:56
12.	"Get Back" (Live at the Beatles' rooftop concert)		30 January 1969 Apple Building rooftop, Savile Row	3:09
13.	"Old Brown Shoe" (demo)	Harrison	25 February 1969 EMI Studios	3:03
14.	"Octopus's Garden" (Takes 2 & 8)	Starkey	26 April 1969 EMI Studios	2:49
15.	"Maxwell's Silver Hammer" (Take 5)		9 July 1969 EMI Studios	3:50
16.	"Something" (demo; mono)	Harrison	25 February 1969 EMI Studios	3:19
17.	"Come Together" (Take 1)		21 July 1969 EMI Studios	3:40
18.	"Come and Get It" (demo by McCartney)	McCartney	24 July 1969 EMI Studios	2:30
19.	"Ain't She Sweet" (jam)	Milton Ager; Jack Yellen	24 July 1969 EMI Studios	2:08
20.	"Because" (a cappella)		4 August 1969 EMI Studios	2:24
21.	"Let It Be" (Savile Row sessions)		25 January 1969 Apple Studio	4:05
22.	"I Me Mine" (Take 16)	Harrison	3 January 1970 EMI Studios	1:48
23.	"The End" (remix featuring final chord of "A Day in the Life")		22 February 1967; 23 July; 5, 7–8, 15 & 18 August 1969 EMI Studios	2:53
Total length:				71:31

== Charts ==
=== Weekly charts ===
Weekly chart performance for Anthology 3
Chart (1996)	Peak position
Australian Albums (ARIA)	3
Austrian Albums (Ö3 Austria)	15
Belgian Albums (Ultratop Flanders)	15
Belgian Albums (Ultratop Wallonia)	11
Canada Top Albums/CDs (RPM)	3
Dutch Albums (Album Top 100)	12
Finnish Albums (Suomen virallinen lista)	7
French Albums (SNEP)	9
German Albums (Offizielle Top 100)	9
Italian Albums (FIMI)	27
Japanese Albums (Oricon)	5
New Zealand Albums (RMNZ)	10
Norwegian Albums (VG-lista)	13
Swedish Albums (Sverigetopplistan)	5
Swiss Albums (Schweizer Hitparade)	23
UK Albums (Official Charts)	4
US Billboard 200	1

=== Year-end charts ===
1996 year-end chart performance for Anthology 3
Chart (1996)	Position
Canada Top Albums/CDs (RPM)	62
Japanese Albums (Oricon)	174
UK Albums (OCC)	81
US Billboard 200	159

1997 year-end chart performance for Anthology 3
Chart (1997)	Position
US Billboard 200	107

== Certifications and sales ==
Certifications and sales for Anthology 3
Region	Certification	Certified units/sales
Australia (ARIA)	Gold	35,000^{^}
Canada (Music Canada)	2× Platinum	200,000^{^}
Japan (RIAJ)	Gold	181,000
United Kingdom (BPI)	Platinum	300,000^{‡}
United States (RIAA)	3× Platinum	1,500,000^{^}
^{^} Shipments figures based on certification alone.^{‡} Sales+streaming figures based on certification alone.

== See also ==
- Outline of the Beatles
- The Beatles timeline
