= Don't Let Me Down (Beatles song) =

1969 single by the Beatles with Billy Preston

- Picture sleeve for 1989 UK reissue

Single by the Beatles with Billy Preston
- A-side: "Get Back"
- Released: 11 April 1969
- Recorded: 28 January 1969, February 1969
- Studio: Apple, London
- Genre: Rock; R&B; soul; blue-eyed soul
- Length: 3:35
- Label: Apple
- Songwriter: Lennon–McCartney
- Producers: Glyn Johns; George Martin

The Beatles singles chronology
"Hey Jude" (1968)	"Get Back" / "Don't Let Me Down" (1969)	"The Ballad of John and Yoko" (1969)

Billy Preston singles chronology
"Hey Brother" (1968)	"Get Back" / "Don't Let Me Down" (1969)	"That's the Way God Planned It" (1969)

Audio sample
- Don't Let Me Down: file; help

Music video
- "Don't Let Me Down" on YouTube

"Don't Let Me Down" is a song by the English rock band the Beatles, recorded in 1969 during the Let It Be/Get Back sessions. It was written by John Lennon and credited to the Lennon–McCartney songwriting partnership. The band recorded the song with keyboardist Billy Preston; the single release with "Get Back" was credited to "the Beatles with Billy Preston". Originally released as a B-side, producer Phil Spector excluded the song from Let It Be. The song's first album appearance in stereo was on the North American collection Hey Jude, released in 1970, and on the global market collection 1967–1970, released in 1973.

== Composition ==
Written by John Lennon as an anguished love song to Yoko Ono, it was interpreted by Paul McCartney as a "genuine plea", with Lennon saying to Ono, "I'm really stepping out of line on this one. I'm really just letting my vulnerability be seen, so you must not let me down."

The song is in the key of E major and is in 4/4 time during the verse, chorus and bridge, but changes to 5/4 in the pick-up to the verse. It grew (like "Sun King") from the F♯m^{7}–E changes from Fleetwood Mac's "Albatross" with McCartney arranging instrumental and vocal parts and George Harrison adding a descending two-part lead guitar accompaniment to the verse and a countermelody in the bridge. Alan W. Pollack states that "the counterpoint melody played in octaves during the Alternate Verse by the bass and lead guitars is one of the more novel, unusual instrumental touches you'll find anywhere in the Beatles catalogue."

== Recording and release ==
Multiple versions of "Don't Let Me Down" were recorded by the Beatles during the Get Back (Let It Be) recording sessions. The version recorded on 28 January 1969, with vocal overdubs in early February, was released as a B-side to the single "Get Back", recorded the same day. "Get Back" reached number one and "Don't Let Me Down" reached number 35 on the US Billboard Hot 100. When the "Get Back" project was revisited, Phil Spector dropped "Don't Let Me Down" from the Let It Be (1970) album.

The Beatles performed "Don't Let Me Down" twice during their rooftop concert of 30 January 1969, and the first performance was included in the Let It Be (1970) film, directed by Michael Lindsay-Hogg. In November 2003, a composite edit of the two rooftop versions was released on Let It Be... Naked. Both versions were seen in the 2022 film The Beatles: Get Back - The Rooftop Concert and are featured on the live album.

The B-side version of the song was included on the Beatles' compilations Hey Jude, 1967–1970, Past Masters Volume 2 and Mono Masters. The same recording also appears on the soundtrack to the 1988 documentary, Imagine: John Lennon.

In 2021, numerous versions of the song were included on Let It Be: Special Edition, including the Get Back LP version and a new mix of the original B-side version with an added dialogue introduction.

== Reception ==
Richie Unterberger of AllMusic called it "one of the Beatles' most powerful love songs", Stephen Thomas Erlewine of AllMusic described the song as "heart-wrenching soul" and Roy Carr and Tony Tyler called it "a superb sobber from misery-expert J. W. O. Lennon, MBE. And still one of the most highly underrated Beatle underbellies." Author Ian MacDonald praised "Don't Let Me Down" and declared that "this track vies with 'Come Together' for consideration as the best of Lennon's late-style Beatles records". "Don't Let Me Down" is the most viewed video on the Beatles' YouTube channel, with over 510 million views.

== Notable cover versions ==
The country-rock duo Dillard & Clark included "Don't Let Me Down" as the final track on their 1969 album Through the Morning, Through the Night.

American alternative rock band Wilco covered the song along with "Dig a Pony" in 2021. The covers were released exclusively on Amazon Music for a promotional campaign marking the release of the Let It Be: Special Edition reissue.

== Personnel ==
- John Lennon – lead vocal, rhythm guitar
- Paul McCartney – bass guitar, harmony vocal
- George Harrison – lead guitar, backing vocal
- Ringo Starr – drums
- Billy Preston – electric piano

Personnel per Ian MacDonald

No official producer's credit was included for the single release owing to "the confused roles of George Martin and Glyn Johns". However, the 1967–1970 compilation liner notes credited Martin as the song's producer.

== Charts ==
Chart performance for "Don't Let Me Down"
Chart (1969)	Peak position
US Billboard Hot 100	35
