= Across the Universe (message) =

2008 interstellar radio message

Across the Universe is an interstellar radio message (IRM) consisting of the song "Across the Universe" by the Beatles that was transmitted on 4 February 2008, at 00:00 UTC by NASA in the direction of the star Polaris. This transmission was made using a 70-meter "DSS-63" dish in the NASA Deep Space Network's (DSN) Madrid Deep Space Communication Complex, located in Robledo, near Madrid, Spain. The transmission ran in the 4.2-cm band (around 7.14 GHz, C band) at a power of 18 kilowatt. The format was digital, transmitted at a rate of 128 kbps, lasting 3.6 minutes – the normal speed and data rate for a digital recording on Earth.

This action was done in order to celebrate the 40th anniversary of the song's recording, the 45th anniversary of the DSN, and the 50th anniversary of NASA. The idea was hatched by Beatles historian Martin Lewis, who encouraged all Beatles fans to play the track as it was beamed towards the distant star. The event marked the third time a song had ever been intentionally transmitted into deep space (the first being Russia's Teen Age Message in 2001, and the second being the 2003 Cosmic Call 2 message which included "Starman" by David Bowie and music from the Hungarian band KFT), and was approved by Paul McCartney, Yoko Ono, and Apple Records.

A. L. Zaitsev, part of the Teen Age Message project, argues that the NASA project is only a publicity stunt. The compressed digital format used makes the data more fragile to errors compared to TAM's analogue approach, not to mention aliens would not have knowledge on human audio compression algorithms. The transmission data rate is also too high to allow for a remote radio station to faithfully receive; a data rate 300,000 times lower would be required. Finally, the choice of Polaris also makes the message unlikely to reach any alien lifeform should they exist.

== See also ==
- List of interstellar radio messages
