= One After 909 =

1970 song by the Beatles

- Cover of the song's sheet music

Song by the Beatles

from the album Let It Be
- Released: 8 May 1970
- Recorded: 30 January 1969
- Venue: Apple Corps rooftop, London
- Genre: Rock and roll; roots rock
- Length: 2:52
- Label: Apple
- Songwriter: Lennon–McCartney
- Producer: Phil Spector

Audio sample
- file; help

"One After 909" (sometimes entitled "The One After 909" in early recordings) is a song by the English rock band the Beatles from their 1970 album Let It Be. It was written by John Lennon, with input from Paul McCartney, and credited to their joint partnership. The album version is the live performance from the rooftop concert which took place on 30 January 1969. This performance is also included in the Let It Be film. The song was written no later than spring 1960 and perhaps as early as 1957, and is one of the first Lennon–McCartney compositions. "One After 909" is perhaps more reminiscent of early American rock and roll than any of the other songs from the rooftop show, and as a joke for the rooftop chatter, Lennon sings a variant on the opening line of "Danny Boy" after the song is finished.

== Origin ==
In his 1980 Playboy interview Lennon explained, "That was something I wrote when I was about seventeen. I lived at 9 Newcastle Road. I was born on the ninth of October, the ninth month [sic]. It's just a number that follows me around, but, numerologically, apparently I'm a number six or a three or something, but it's all part of nine."

McCartney said, "It's not a great song but it's a great favourite of mine because it has great memories for me of John and I trying to write a bluesy freight-train song. There were a lot of those songs at the time, like 'Midnight Special', 'Freight Train', 'Rock Island Line', so this was the 'One After 909'; she didn't get the 9:09, she got the one after it."

== Different versions ==
John Lennon, Paul McCartney, and George Harrison first recorded the song in early 1960 under The Quarrymen name, but the recording does not survive. In mid-1960, the Beatles recorded the song again, on a home demos tape, but the recording has not been officially released.

On 5 March 1963, the Beatles recorded a version of the song in five takes during the same session that produced their third single, "From Me to You", and its B-side "Thank You Girl". They were unhappy with the result and that version was not released at the time. Various takes from the 5 March session, and an edit of them, were released in 1995 on the Anthology 1 compilation.

The song was then shelved for six years, until the Beatles re-recorded it in January 1969 for their Get Back project, and the rooftop concert performance of the song was released on Let It Be. "One After 909" is also included on 2003's Let It Be... Naked, in a remixed and remastered version of the concert take. A preceding studio take of the song from January 1969 (take three) was released as part of the 2021 re-release of Let It Be.

== Personnel ==
=== Let It Be (1970, recorded 1969) ===
According to Mark Lewisohn:

The Beatles

- John Lennon – lead vocals, rhythm guitar
- Paul McCartney – backing vocals, bass guitar
- George Harrison – lead guitar
- Ringo Starr – drums

Additional musician

- Billy Preston – electric piano

=== Anthology 1 (1995, recorded 1963) ===
According to Ian MacDonald:

The Beatles

- John Lennon – lead vocal, rhythm guitar, harmonica
- Paul McCartney – harmony vocal, bass
- George Harrison – lead guitar
- Ringo Starr – drums

== Cover versions ==
The song has been covered by various artists including Ricky Nelson, Terry Manning, Laibach, Willie Nelson, Helen Reddy, Carmen Rasmusen, the Long Ryders, and The Smithereens. James Apollo recorded a version of the song in 2010 for Mojo's 40th Anniversary recreation Let It Be Revisited. Caspar Babypants released a children's version in 2015.
