= The Beatles' rooftop concert =

Final public performance of the Beatles

Coordinates: 51°30′37.5″N 0°08′23.0″W

- Concert by the Beatles
- Venue: Apple Corps headquarters rooftop, London
- Date: 30 January 1969
- Duration: 42:00

The Beatles concert chronology
- 1966 US tour; The Beatles' rooftop concert

On 30 January 1969, the Beatles performed a concert from the rooftop of their Apple Corps headquarters at 3 Savile Row, in central London's office and fashion district. Joined by guest keyboardist Billy Preston, the band played a 42-minute set before the Metropolitan Police arrived and told them to reduce the volume. It was the final public performance of their career. They performed nine takes of five new songs as crowds of onlookers, many on lunch breaks, congregated in the streets and on the rooftops of nearby buildings to listen. The concert ended with "Get Back", and John Lennon jokingly said, "I'd like to say thank you on behalf of the group and ourselves, and I hope we've passed the audition."

The performance was filmed and recorded. The first performance of "I've Got a Feeling" and single takes of "One After 909" and "Dig a Pony" were included on Let It Be, the band's 12th and final studio album, while footage was used in the 1970 documentary film Let It Be.

Footage was later used in the 2021 documentary series The Beatles: Get Back. On 28 January 2022, the audio of the performance was released by Apple Corps, Capitol Records, and Universal Music Enterprises to streaming services under the title Get Back – The Rooftop Performance. In February 2022, Disney released the concert sequence from The Beatles: Get Back in IMAX as The Beatles: Get Back – The Rooftop Concert.

== Background ==
Although the rooftop concert was unannounced, the original intention behind the Beatles' Get Back project had been for the band to stage a comeback as live performers. The idea of a large public show was sidelined, however, as one of George Harrison's conditions for returning to the group after he had walked out of the filmed rehearsals on 10 January. Another of Harrison's stipulations was that they move from Twickenham Film Studios to their Apple Corps headquarters and record their new songs in the basement of Apple Studio. On 22 January, Harrison brought in keyboardist Billy Preston as an additional musician, in the hope that a talented outsider would encourage the band to be tight and focused. Paul McCartney and Michael Lindsay-Hogg, the director of the project, continued to hope that the Beatles would end the recording sessions with a live performance in front of an audience.

There was a plan to play live somewhere. We were wondering where we could go – "Oh, the Palladium or the Sahara". But we would have had to take all the stuff, so we decided, "Let's get up on the roof."

— Ringo Starr, 2000

According to Beatles historian Mark Lewisohn, it is uncertain who thought of a rooftop concert, but the idea was conceived just days before the actual event. In Preston's recollection, it was John Lennon who suggested it. In his autobiography Sound Man, audio engineer Glyn Johns said the idea for the concert was his. He recalled that it originated from a lunchtime discussion, when Ringo Starr mentioned that there was a great view of London's West End from the roof and took Johns and Lindsay-Hogg up to see it. Mal Evans, the Beatles' road manager, recorded in his diary that the idea came about "after we'd taken a breath of fresh air on the roof after lunch" on 26 January. Peter Jackson's documentary series The Beatles: Get Back shows Johns and Lindsay-Hogg presenting McCartney with the idea and McCartney being excited about it.

Starr was initially determined not to play, and Harrison was reluctant. The 29 January audio tapes for Lindsay-Hogg's production capture McCartney pleading with Lennon that a live performance was essential to maintain the Beatles' connection with their audience, and the band members merely needed to overcome their stage fright. In a group discussion at the end of that day, Harrison talked enthusiastically about the upcoming show for the first time and joked about performing for an audience of chimneys. Consistent with a decision he made during the Twickenham rehearsals, however, Harrison declined to have any of his songs included in the set.

== Preparation ==
Evans arranged for the building of a stage on the Apple rooftop and the setting up of the band's equipment. The instruments used during the performance were Lennon's stripped-back Epiphone Casino, McCartney's signature Höfner "violin" bass, Harrison's new, custom-made rosewood Fender Telecaster, and Starr's recently acquired Ludwig drum kit, plus a Fender Rhodes electric piano for Preston. Johns and assistant engineer Alan Parsons purchased women's stockings from a local Marks & Spencer store to protect the microphones from the winter wind. Plans to hire a helicopter to capture aerial footage were abandoned.

The audio was recorded on two eight-track recorders in the basement studio at Apple by Johns and Parsons. Lindsay-Hogg's crew used six cameras to film several angles of the performance. In addition to cameras located on the rooftop with the band, one camera was placed, without permission, on the roof of a building across the street; a camera was hidden behind a two-way mirror in the reception area of the building, ready to capture any disruption caused by the loud music; and two cameras were on the street to film interviews and reactions from passers-by.

== Performance ==
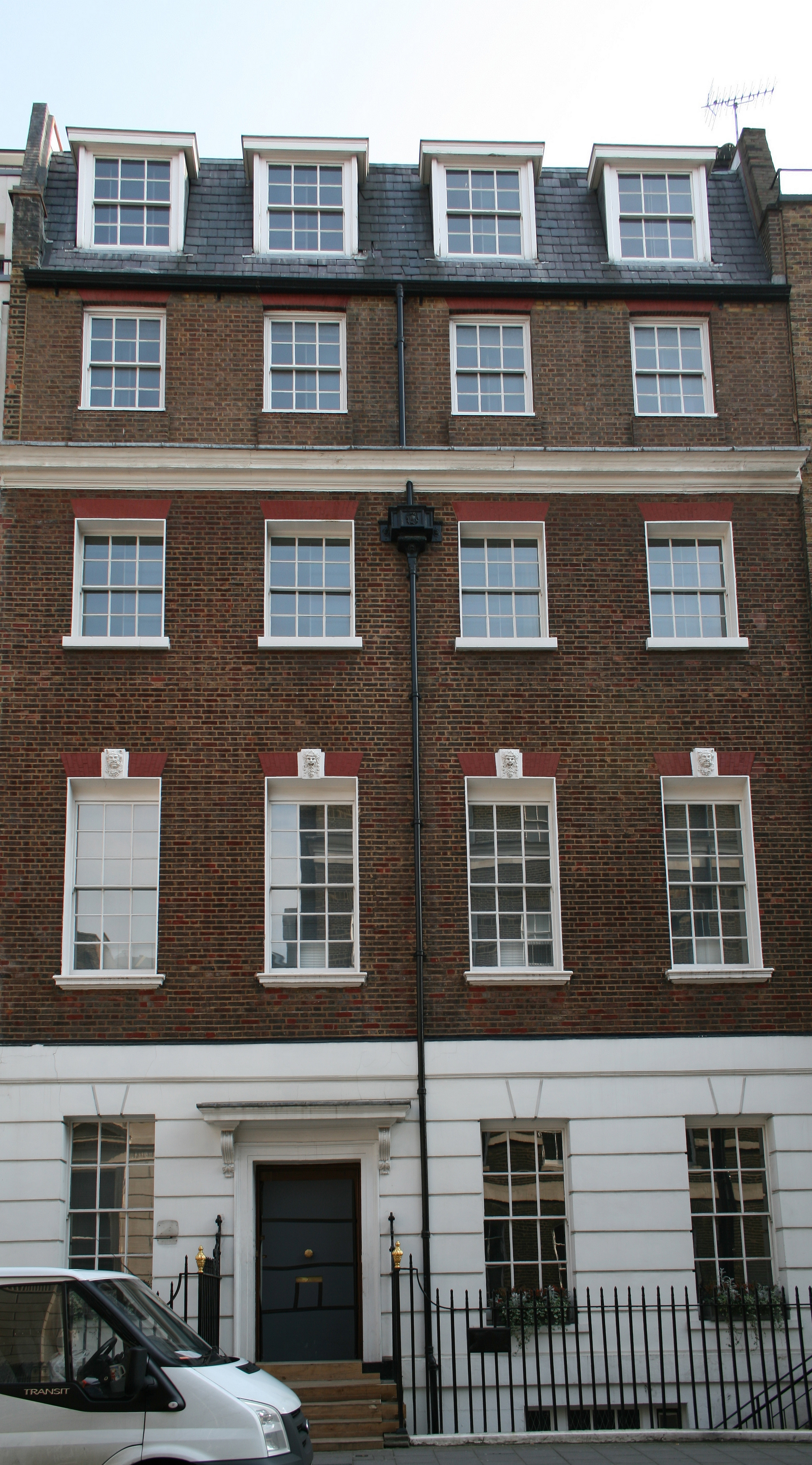
3 Savile Row, London, the location of the concert (pictured in 2007)

Until the last minute, according to Lindsay-Hogg, the Beatles were still undecided about performing the concert. He recalled that they had discussed it and then gone silent, until "John said in the silence, 'Fuck it – let's go do it.'"

The four Beatles and Preston arrived on the roof at around 12:30 pm. When they began to play, there was confusion nearby among members of the public, many of whom were on their lunch break. As the news of the event spread, crowds began to congregate in the streets and on the flat rooftops of nearby buildings. While most responded positively to the concert, the Metropolitan Police grew concerned about noise and traffic issues, having received complaints from local businesses. The film cameras captured police officers Ray Dagg and Ray Shayler arriving at Apple to stop the performance. Apple employees initially kept the officers in the reception area and refused to let them up to the roof, but acquiesced when threatened with arrest.

According to Johns, the band fully expected to be interrupted by the police, since there was a police station not far along Savile Row. The authorities' intervention satisfied a suggestion made by McCartney earlier in January, that the Beatles should perform their concert "in a place we're not allowed to do it ... like we should trespass, go in, set up and then get moved ... Getting forcibly ejected, still trying to play your numbers, and the police lifting you."

The officers ascended to the roof just as the Beatles began the second take of "Don't Let Me Down". During the next number – the final version of "Get Back" – McCartney improvised the lyrics to reflect the situation: "You've been playing on the roofs again, and that's no good, 'cause you know your Mummy doesn't like that ... she gets angry ... she's gonna have you arrested!" Acting on the police officers' instructions, Evans turned off Lennon and Harrison's guitar amplifiers mid-song, only for Harrison to turn his amplifier back on. Evans then turned Lennon's back on as the band continued to play.

The concert came to an end with the conclusion of "Get Back". McCartney said "Thanks Mo", in response to enthusiastic applause and cheers from Maureen Starkey, Starr's wife. It was raining and Starr played wearing his wife's red raincoat. Lennon said: "I'd like to say thank you on behalf of the group and ourselves, and I hope we've passed the audition."

== Set list ==
Get Back – The Rooftop Performance

Live album by the Beatles
- Released: 28 January 2022
- Recorded: 30 January 1969
- Studio: Apple
- Genre: Rock
- Length: 38:28
- Label: Calderstone Productions
- Producers: Glyn Johns and George Martin
- Compilers: Giles Martin and Sam Okell

The Beatles chronology
| Let It Be: Special Edition (2021) | Get Back – The Rooftop Performance (2022) | Revolver: Special Edition (2022) |

The rooftop concert consisted of nine complete takes of five Beatles songs: three takes of "Get Back"; two each of "Don't Let Me Down" and "I've Got a Feeling"; and one take each of "One After 909" and "Dig a Pony". On 28 January 2022, the audio of the full rooftop performance was released in Dolby Atmos to streaming services as Get Back – The Rooftop Performance. The album version reproduced the set list in its performance order. As seen in the 2021 Disney+ documentary series The Beatles: Get Back, a short take of "Get Back" was also played and filmed before takes one and two, as part of the preliminary sound check, and "Dig a Pony" was preceded by a false start. After "I've Got a Feeling" (Take 2), Lennon introduced the following song as "And for the First Time" and the band started playing another take of "Get Back" before he corrected himself, introducing the right song as "Don't Let Me Down". The concert also included a short take of the British national anthem "God Save the Queen". Track times are taken from the streaming version released in 2022.

All tracks are written by John Lennon and Paul McCartney, except where noted:

1. "Get Back" (Take 1) – 4:43
2. "Get Back" (Take 2) – 3:24
3. "Don't Let Me Down" (Take 1) – 3:22
4. "I've Got a Feeling" (Take 1) – 4:44
5. "One After 909" – 3:09
6. "Dig a Pony" – 5:52
7. "God Save the Queen" (Traditional, arranged by Lennon, McCartney, Harrison, and Starkey) – 0:26
8. "I've Got a Feeling" (Take 2) – 5:35
9. "Don't Let Me Down" (Take 2) – 3:30
10. "Get Back" (Take 3) – 3:47

== Releases ==
The audio recording and film footage of the concert have been released in various formats.

The first releases were in May 1970. Let It Be, the band's 12th and final studio album, includes the first performance of "I've Got a Feeling" and the recordings of "One After 909" and "Dig a Pony". Footage of the concert was included in Let It Be, the documentary film directed by Michael Lindsay-Hogg for the Beatles' Apple Corps media company.

In 1996, the third live performance of "Get Back"—the last song of the Beatles' final live performance—was included on Anthology 3, the band's third compilation album.

Let It Be... Naked, a 2003 remix of the 1970 album, includes an edit of the two takes of "Don't Let Me Down" and a composite of the two takes of "I've Got a Feeling".

The 2021 special edition of the Let It Be album includes the first performance of "Don't Let Me Down", along with brief jams of "I Want You (She's So Heavy)" (after the first "Get Back") and "God Save the Queen" (after "Dig a Pony"), recorded while Parsons changed tapes. Lennon sang lines from "Danny Boy" and "A Pretty Girl Is Like a Melody" respectively after the songs "One After 909" and "I've Got a Feeling" (Take 2).

Footage from the concert appears in the third and final episode of the 2021 documentary series The Beatles: Get Back, which also uses other footage recorded for the 1970 documentary. The concert sequence was remastered for IMAX and released in February 2022 by Disney as The Beatles: Get Back – The Rooftop Concert.

On 28 January 2022, the audio of the performance was released by Apple Corps, Capitol Records, and Universal Music Enterprises to streaming services under the title Get Back – The Rooftop Performance.

== Legacy ==
The Beatles' rooftop concert marked the end of an era for the group. The group recorded one more album, Abbey Road, for which work started the following month, but in September 1969 Lennon left the band. At the time, many observers believed that the concert was a trial run for a return to live performances and touring, with the band re-engaging with their rock 'n' roll roots. The concert footage provided the climax of Lindsay-Hogg's documentary, originally planned as a TV special but released as the Let It Be film in May 1970, a month after the Beatles' break-up.

Author James Perone wrote in 2005 that the concert had achieved "iconic status" among fans as the Beatles' final live appearance; and in the history of rock music on the level of the Monterey Pop, Woodstock, and Altamont festivals. He argued that the show was not technically a concert because of the secrecy surrounding its presentation, so the band's last concert occurred on 29 August 1966 in San Francisco—but it captured an unpredictability typical of live rock performances in 1969.

=== Homages ===
The Rutles' "Get Up and Go" sequence in the 1978 film All You Need Is Cash mimics the footage of the rooftop concert, and uses similar camera angles. In January 2009, tribute band the Bootleg Beatles attempted to stage a 40th-anniversary concert in the same location, but were refused permission by Westminster City Council because of licensing problems.

U2 paid homage to the Beatles and this concert in their 1987 video for "Where the Streets Have No Name", which featured a similar rooftop concert in Los Angeles. To promote the release of their 2009 album No Line on the Horizon, they performed a rooftop concert atop the BBC's Broadcasting House.

Manchester indie band James performed a similar rooftop gig on the 22nd anniversary of the Beatles' version (30 January 1991) atop the Piccadilly hotel. The band performed five songs before ending the set, reputedly because Larry Gott's fingers had become frozen to his fretboard.

In The Simpsons 1993 fifth-season episode "Homer's Barbershop Quartet", the Be Sharps (Homer's eponymous quartet with Apu, Barney and Principal Skinner) perform a rendition of one of their previous hits, "Baby on Board", on the rooftop of Moe's Tavern. Harrison, who guest-starred in the episode, is shown driving by the tavern in his limousine, briefly looks out the window at the scene, and dismissively says: "It's been done!" before driving off. As the song ends and the episode end credits roll, Homer repeats Lennon's famous end quip about "passing the audition," and everyone laughs, including Barney, until he says, "I don't get it."

In the 2007 film Across the Universe, a musical made up of Beatles music, Sadie's band performs a rooftop concert in New York City that mimics the original. It is interrupted and closed down by the New York Police Department.

McCartney played a surprise mini-concert in midtown Manhattan from the top of the marquee of the Ed Sullivan Theater on 15 July 2009, where he was recording a performance for the Late Show with David Letterman. News of the event spread via Twitter and word of mouth, and nearby street corners were closed off to accommodate the crowd.

The music video for Kazuyoshi Saito's 2010 song "Zutto Suki Datta" faithfully recreates the rooftop performance of "Get Back" with Saito as McCartney, Lily Franky as Lennon, Hiroyuki Kobori as Harrison, and Gaku Hamada as Starr. It won Best Male Video at the 2011 Space Shower Music Video Awards.

== Personnel ==
=== The Beatles ===
- John Lennon – lead and backing vocals, rhythm guitar; lead guitar on "Get Back"
- Paul McCartney – lead and backing vocals, bass guitar
- George Harrison – backing vocals, lead guitar; rhythm guitar on "Get Back"
- Ringo Starr – drums

=== Additional musician ===
- Billy Preston – electric piano

== See also ==
- Outline of the Beatles
- The Beatles timeline
- List of the Beatles' live performances

== Sources ==
- Babiuk, Andy (2002). Beatles Gear: All the Fab Four's Instruments, from Stage to Studio. San Francisco, CA: Backbeat Books. ISBN 978-0-87930-731-8.
- The Beatles (2000). The Beatles Anthology. Chronicle Books. ISBN 978-0-8118-3636-4.
- The Beatles (2021). The Beatles: Get Back. London: Callaway Arts & Entertainment. ISBN 978-0-935112962.
- Everett, Walter (1999). The Beatles as Musicians: Revolver through the Anthology. New York, NY: Oxford University Press. ISBN 978-0-19-512941-0.
- Johns, Glyn (2014). Sound Man. New York, NY: Plume. ISBN 978-0-14-751657-2.
- MacDonald, Ian (2005). Revolution in the Head: The Beatles' Records and the Sixties (3rd (2007) ed.). Chicago Review Press. ISBN 978-1-55652-733-3.
- Lewisohn, Mark (2010) [1992]. The Complete Beatles Chronicle: The Definitive Day-by-Day Guide to the Beatles' Entire Career. Chicago Review Press. ISBN 978-1-56976-534-0.
- Miles, Barry (2001). The Beatles Diary Volume 1: The Beatles Years. London: Omnibus Press. ISBN 0-7119-8308-9.
- Perone, James E. (2005). Woodstock: An Encyclopedia of the Music and Art Fair. Westport, CT: Greenwood Press. ISBN 978-0-313-33057-5.
- Sulpy, Doug; Schweighardt, Ray (1999). Get Back: The Unauthorized Chronicle of the Beatles' Let It Be Disaster. New York, NY: St. Martin's Griffin. ISBN 0-312-19981-3.
- Womack, Kenneth (2014). The Beatles Encyclopedia: Everything Fab Four. Santa Barbara, CA: ABC-CLIO. ISBN 978-0-313-39171-2.
