= Jesse Selengut =

American jazz musician

Background information
- Born: September 9, 1968 (age 58); Dover, New Jersey, U.S.
- Genres: Jazz, free jazz, avant-garde jazz
- Instruments: Trumpet, vocals

Jesse Selengut (born September 9, 1968) is an American trumpeter, composer, and singer. Selengut led the contemporary jazz group NOIR. He is also the singer and trumpet player for the swing band Tin Pan. CD's Hound's Tooth 2009 & Yes, Yes, Yes 2015

He earned a master's degree in jazz studies from New York University.
