= I've Got a Feeling =

- Sheet music cover

Song by the Beatles

from the album Let It Be
- Released: 8 May 1970
- Recorded: 30 January 1969
- Studio: EMI and Olympic Sound, London
- Venue: Apple Corps rooftop, London
- Genre: Blues rock; hard rock
- Length: 3:37
- Label: Apple
- Songwriter: Lennon–McCartney
- Producer: Phil Spector

"I've Got a Feeling" is a song by the English rock band the Beatles from their 1970 album Let It Be. It was recorded on 30 January 1969 during the Beatles' rooftop concert. It is a combination of two unfinished songs: Paul McCartney's "I've Got a Feeling" and John Lennon's "Everybody Had a Hard Year". The song features Billy Preston on electric piano.

A studio take of the song, recorded about a week earlier, was released on the Anthology 3 compilation in 1996. The 2003 remix album Let It Be... Naked includes a version of the song that is a composite edit of the rooftop concert take used on Let It Be and a second attempt at the song from the same concert.

With Lennon's vocals isolated out during the production of Peter Jackson's Get Back documentary, McCartney performed the song live as a virtual duet on his 2022 Got Back tour.

== Composition ==
Lennon's song was a litany where every line started with the word "everybody". The song had been recorded twice before by Lennon, prior to the Let It Be sessions. The first occurred in early December 1968 at Lennon's Kenwood estate on a portable cassette tape. For this, the lyric was "Everyone had a hard year" instead of the later "Everybody". Later in December 1968, with the lyric changed to "everybody," Lennon was filmed performing the song in the back garden of Kenwood. This footage was used in the Yoko Ono art film Rape: Film No. 6, which was broadcast on Austrian television on 31 March 1969.

== Personnel ==
Personnel per Ian MacDonald

The Beatles

- Paul McCartney – bass guitar, lead vocals
- John Lennon – rhythm guitar, lead vocals
- George Harrison – lead guitar, backing vocals
- Ringo Starr – drums

Additional musicians

- Billy Preston – Fender Rhodes piano

== Sources ==
- Lewisohn, Mark (1988). The Beatles Recording Sessions. New York: Harmony Books. ISBN 0-517-57066-1.
- MacDonald, Ian (2005). Revolution in the Head: The Beatles' Records and the Sixties (Second Revised ed.). London: Pimlico (Rand). ISBN 1-84413-828-3.
- Winn, John C. (2009). That Magic Feeling: The Beatles' Recorded Legacy, Volume Two, 1966–1970. New York, NY: Three Rivers Press. ISBN 978-0-307-45239-9.
