= Two of Us (Beatles song) =

1970 song by the Beatles

- Cover of the song's sheet music

Song by the Beatles

from the album Let It Be
- Released: 8 May 1970
- Recorded: 31 January 1969
- Studio: Apple, London
- Genre: Folk rock
- Length: 3:33
- Label: Apple
- Songwriter: Lennon–McCartney
- Producer: Phil Spector

Audio sample
- "Two of Us": file; help

Music video
- "Two Of Us" on YouTube

"Two of Us" is a song written by Paul McCartney and credited to the Lennon–McCartney partnership. The song was recorded by the Beatles on 31 January 1969.

"Two of Us" was originally released as the opening track on Let It Be (1970) and a remix of that recording was later included on Let It Be... Naked (2003). An outtake of the song, recorded on 24 January 1969, was released on Anthology 3 (1996).

The song's title was used for the 2000 TV movie Two of Us, which depicts a fictionalized version of a 1976 reunion between McCartney and Lennon.

== History ==
McCartney wrote this song about his travel adventures with his then-girlfriend, Linda Eastman, whom he married in March 1969. As the Beatles were breaking up, it took on new meaning as a gesture of affection to Lennon.

The song was originally titled "On Our Way Home". Ian MacDonald suggested that the lyrics (e.g.: "you and I have memories/longer than the road that stretches out ahead" or "you and me chasing paper/getting nowhere") sounded like McCartney was probably addressing Lennon and contractual troubles. "You Never Give Me Your Money", a McCartney composition on Abbey Road, also refers to the Beatles' contract with Allen Klein as "funny paper".

The song is also an ode to one of Lennon and McCartney's influences, the harmonies of the Everly Brothers.

An early performance of the song, in a guitar-driven rock style, can be seen in the Let It Be film and later in the documentary series The Beatles: Get Back. Unsatisfied with this style, which McCartney described as "chunky", the band reworked the song around acoustic guitars. The Beatles performed a finished version of the song live at Apple Studios on 31 January 1969; this performance was included in both the Let It Be film and album. The clip was also broadcast on The Ed Sullivan Show on 1 March 1970 as the final appearance by the Beatles on the program.

In between several takes of the song on 24 January 1969, the band spontaneously started playing a hammed-up version of traditional Liverpudlian song "Maggie Mae". The 38-second song would also end up on the Let It Be album, but is omitted in Let It Be... Naked. A version of "Two of Us" from that day is featured on Anthology 3.

In May 1969, McCartney produced a recording of the song using this title by the group Mortimer, a New York City trio that briefly recorded for Apple, but this recording was never released.

On the Let It Be album, producer Phil Spector added, as a spoken introduction to the song, a remark by Lennon, who says: "'I Dig A Pygmy' by Charles Hawtrey and the Deaf-Aids! Phase one, in which Doris gets her oats!" This intro was removed in the Let It Be... Naked version, but it can still be found in the Get Back documentary.

== Personnel ==
According to Ian MacDonald:

- Paul McCartney – lead vocal, acoustic guitar
- John Lennon – co-lead vocal, acoustic guitar
- George Harrison – lead guitar (bass part on a six-string Fender Telecaster)
- Ringo Starr – drums

== In popular culture ==
- Two of Us is the title of a 2000 VH1 television drama which offers a fictionalised account of 24 April 1976, the day Lorne Michaels of Saturday Night Live offered the Beatles $3,000 to appear on the program, when by coincidence McCartney was visiting Lennon at his New York apartment and watching the program.
- At D5 Conference in 2007, Steve Jobs got emotional with Bill Gates about their friendship. He described their friendship with the song: "You and I have memories longer than the road that stretches out ahead."
- "Two of Us" is included in the soundtrack of the 2026 film Project Hail Mary. It appears towards the end of the movie when the protagonist launches four space probes, which are named for the Beatles. The lyric "We're on our way home" is prominent as the probes leave for Earth.
