= Across the Universe =

1969 song by the Beatles

Song by the Beatles

from the album No One's Gonna Change Our World
- Released: 12 December 1969
- Recorded: 4 and 8 February 1968; 2 October 1969
- Studio: EMI, London
- Genre: Psychedelia
- Length: 3:49
- Label: Regal Starline
- Songwriter: Lennon–McCartney
- Producer: George Martin

"Across the Universe" is a song by the English rock band the Beatles. It was written by John Lennon and credited to Lennon–McCartney. The song first appeared on the 1969 various artists' charity compilation album No One's Gonna Change Our World and later, in a different form, on their 1970 album Let It Be, the group's final released studio album. The original version featured on two different albums both titled Rarities: a 1978 British release and a 1980 US release. It was also included on their 1988 album Past Masters, Volume Two. The song has been covered by many artists, including David Bowie on his 1975 album Young Americans, which featured contributions from Lennon.

== Composition ==
One night in 1967, the phrase "words are flowing out like endless rain into a paper cup" came to Lennon after listening to the voice of his then-wife Cynthia:

I was lying next to my first wife in bed, you know, and I was irritated, and I was thinking. She must have been going on and on about something and she'd gone to sleep and I kept hearing these words over and over, flowing like an endless stream. I went downstairs and it turned into a sort of cosmic song rather than an irritated song, rather than a "Why are you always mouthing off at me?" [The words] were purely inspirational and were given to me as boom! I don't own it you know; it came through like that.

The flavour of the song was heavily influenced by Lennon's and the Beatles' interest in Transcendental Meditation in late 1967 – early 1968, when the song was composed. On this basis, he added the mantra "Jai guru deva om" (Sanskrit: जय गुरुदेव ॐ) to the piece, which became the link to the chorus. The Sanskrit phrase is a tribute to Maharishi Mahesh Yogi's spiritual teacher, "All glory to Guru Dev".

The song's lyrical structure is straightforward: three repetitions of a unit consisting of a verse, the line "Jai guru deva om" and the line "Nothing's gonna change my world" sung four times. The lyrics are highly image-based, with abstract concepts personified with phrases like thoughts "meandering", words "slithering", and undying love "shining". The title phrase "across the universe" appears at intervals to finish lines, although it never cadences, always appearing as a rising figure, melodically unresolved. It finishes on the leading note; to the Western musical ear, the next musical note would be the tonic and would therefore sound complete.

In his 1970 interview with Rolling Stone, Lennon referred to the song as perhaps the best, most poetic lyric he ever wrote: "It's one of the best lyrics I've written. In fact, it could be the best. It's good poetry, or whatever you call it, without chewin' it. See, the ones I like are the ones that stand as words, without melody. They don't have to have any melody, like a poem, you can read them."

== Musical structure ==
On a standard-tuned guitar (EADGBE) the song is played in the key of D; however, the recording was slowed electronically, resulting in a lower C♯ tuning to the ear. The verse beginning "Words are flowing out" (I (D) chord) is notable for a prolonged vi (Bm)–iii (F♯m) to ii^{7} (Em^{7}) minor drop to the dominant chord V^{7} (A^{7}) on "across the universe" in the 4th bar. On the repeat of this chord sequence a turn following the ii^{7} (Em^{7}) through a iv minor (Gm) brings the verse to a close before moving on directly to the tonic on the "Jai Guru Deva Om" refrain. The vi–ii minor drop leading to V was also used in "I Will" (on "how long I've loved you") and George Harrison had utilised a shorter vi–iii minor alternation to delay getting back to the dominant (V) in "I Need You". The verse beginning "Words are flowing out like endless rain ..." is also notable for the suitably breathless phrasing and almost constant 8th-note rhythm (initially four D melody notes, then C♯, B, A, B).

== Recording and version history ==
Complete recording and mixing history
Date	Activity
4 February 1968	Takes one–two and four–seven recorded. Overdub onto take seven. Reduction into take eight. Overdub onto take eight. Sound effects on tracks one–three.
8 February 1968	Overdub onto take eight. Bird sounds overdubbed onto take eight. Mono mixing from take eight.
2 October 1969	Bird sounds overdubbed onto take eight. Stereo mixing from take eight. Version released on the album No One's Gonna Change Our World and later on Past Masters.
5 January 1970	Stereo mixing from take eight. Version to have been released on 5 January Get Back album.
23 March 1970	Stereo mixing from take eight.
1 April 1970	Reduction into take nine. Orchestral and choral overdubs onto take nine.
2 April 1970	Stereo mixing from take nine. Version released on the Let It Be album.

=== February 1968 recordings ===
In February 1968, the Beatles convened at the EMI Abbey Road studios to record a single for release during their absence on their forthcoming trip to India. Paul McCartney had written "Lady Madonna", and Lennon had "Across the Universe". Both tracks were recorded along with Lennon's "Hey Bulldog" and the vocal track for Harrison's "The Inner Light" between 3 and 11 February.

The basic track was taped on 4 February. Along with acoustic guitar, percussion and tambura, it featured an overdubbed sitar introduction by Harrison. Deciding the song needed a high-pitched voice to sing the refrain "Nothing's gonna change my world", McCartney approached fans waiting outside the studio and asked if anyone could hold a high note. Lizzie Bravo and Gayleen Pease answered yes. Shortly after, the band's road manager, Mal Evans, came out and ushered the two girls into the recording studio to record the backing vocals. Although the girls' voices are not heard on the version of "Across the Universe" on the album Let It Be, their background vocals are heard on the albums No One's Gonna Change Our World, Rarities and Past Masters.

Lennon was still not satisfied with the feel of the track, and several sound effects were taped, including 15 seconds of humming and a guitar and a harp-like sound, both to be played backwards; however, none of these were used on the released version. The track was mixed to mono and put aside as the group had decided to release "Lady Madonna" and "The Inner Light" as the single. On their return from India, the group set about recording the many songs they had written there, and "Across the Universe" remained on the shelf. In the autumn of 1968, the Beatles seriously considered releasing an EP including most of the songs for the Yellow Submarine album and "Across the Universe", and went as far as having the EP mastered.

=== World Wildlife Fund version ===
During the February 1968 recording sessions, Spike Milligan dropped into the studio and, on hearing the song, suggested the track would be ideal for release on a charity album he was organising for the World Wildlife Fund. At some point during the sessions, the Beatles agreed to this proposal. In keeping with the "wildlife" theme of the album, sound effects of birds were added to the beginning and end. The original (mono) mix from February 1968 is 3:37 in length. After the effects were added, the track was sped up so that even with 20 seconds of effects, it is only 3:49. Speeding up the recording also raised the key to E-flat. By October 1969, it was decided that the song needed to be remixed into stereo. This was done by Geoff Emerick immediately prior to the banding of the album. "Across the Universe" was first released in this version on the Regal Starline SRS 5013 album No One's Gonna Change Our World in December 1969.

This version was issued, in its stereo form, on four Beatles compilation albums: the British version of Rarities, the different American version of Rarities, The Beatles Ballads, and the second disc of the two-CD Past Masters album, released in 1988. The original mono mix, which had been considered for an aborted Yellow Submarine EP, was finally released on Mono Masters, part of The Beatles in Mono box set, in 2009. In the 2018 White Album anniversary box set, liner notes author Kevin Howlett corrected a dating error from the 2009 Mono Masters collection. Howlett clarified that the included mono version is actually the original February 1968 mono mix, rather than a unique mix created in January 1969.

=== Let It Be version ===
"Across the Universe"
- Sheet music cover

Song by the Beatles

from the album Let It Be
- Released: 8 May 1970
- Recorded: 4 and 8 February 1968; 1 April 1970
- Studio: EMI, London
- Genre: Psychedelia
- Length: 3:47
- Label: Apple
- Songwriter: Lennon–McCartney
- Producer: Phil Spector

The Beatles took the song up again during the Get Back/Let It Be rehearsal sessions of January 1969; footage of Lennon playing the song appeared in the Let It Be movie. Bootleg recordings from the sessions include numerous full group performances of the song, usually with Lennon–McCartney harmonies on the chorus. To ensure the album tied in with the film, it was decided that the song must be included on what by January 1970 had become the Let It Be album.

Although the song was extensively rehearsed on the Twickenham Studios soundstage, the only recordings were mono transcriptions for use in the film soundtrack. No multitrack recordings were made after the group's move to Apple Studios. Thus in early January 1970 Glyn Johns remixed the February 1968 recording. The new mix omitted the teenage girls' vocals and the bird sound effects of the World Wildlife Fund version. As neither of the Glyn Johns Get Back albums were officially released until 2021, the most well-known version of the song came from Phil Spector, who in late March and early April 1970 remixed the February 1968 recording yet again and added orchestral and choral overdubs. Spector also slowed the track to 3:47, close to its original duration. According to Lennon, "Spector took the tape and did a damn good job with it".

=== Other versions ===
A previously unreleased February 1968 alternative take of the song (recorded before the master), without heavy production, appeared on Anthology 2 in 1996. This is often referred to as the "psychedelic" recording because of the strong Indian sitar and tambura sound, and illustrates the band's original uncertainty over the best treatment for the song.

The February 1968 master was remixed again for inclusion on Let It Be... Naked in 2003, at its original speed but stripped of most of the instrumentation and digitally processed to correct tuning issues.

In 2018, take 6 of the song was released on The Beatles: 50th Anniversary Edition (also known as the "White Album"). This version is a bit more sparse than the Let It Be... Naked version and lasts 15 seconds longer.

=== Later reflections ===
Lennon was unhappy with the song as it was recorded. In his 1980 Playboy interview, Lennon said that the Beatles "didn't make a good record of it" and said of the Let It Be version that "the guitars are out of tune and I'm singing out of tune ... and nobody's supporting me or helping me with it and the song was never done properly". He further accused McCartney of ruining the song:

Paul would ... sort of subconsciously try and destroy a great song ... usually we'd spend hours doing little detailed cleaning-ups of Paul's songs; when it came to mine ... somehow this atmosphere of looseness and casualness and experimentation would creep in. Subconscious sabotage.

== Personnel ==
=== No One's Gonna Change Our World (1969) ===
According to Ian MacDonald:

The Beatles

- John Lennon – lead and backing vocals, lead and acoustic rhythm guitar
- Paul McCartney – backing vocal, piano
- George Harrison – backing vocal, sitar, tambura
- Ringo Starr – maracas, tom tom

Additional musicians and production

- George Martin – Hammond organ; producer
- Lizzie Bravo – backing vocal
- Gayleen Pease – backing vocal

=== Let It Be (1970) ===
According to John C. Winn:

The Beatles

- John Lennon – lead vocal, acoustic and electric guitar
- Paul McCartney – piano
- George Harrison – tambura
- Ringo Starr – drums, maracas

Additional musicians and production

- Phil Spector – producer
- uncredited session musicians – choir, cellos, violas, harp, violins, trumpets, trombones

== Critical reception and legacy ==
Music critic Richie Unterberger of AllMusic said the song was "one of the group's most delicate and cosmic ballads" and "one of the highlights of the Let It Be album". Neil Finn of Crowded House and Split Enz named the song as possibly his favorite written song of all time.

Music critic Ian MacDonald was critical of the song, calling it a "plaintively babyish incantation" and saying "its vague pretensions and listless melody are rather too obviously the products of acid grandiosity rendered gentle by sheer exhaustion".

=== NASA transmission ===
On 4 February 2008, at 00:00 UTC, NASA transmitted the Interstellar Message "Across the Universe" in the direction of the star Polaris, 431 light-years from Earth. The transmission was made using a 70-metre antenna in the Deep Space Network's Madrid Deep Space Communication Complex, located outside of Madrid, Spain. It was done with an "X band" transmitter, radiating into the antenna at 18 kW. This was done to celebrate the 40th anniversary of the song's recording, the 45th anniversary of the Deep Space Network (DSN), and the 50th anniversary of NASA. The idea was hatched by Beatles historian Martin Lewis, who encouraged all Beatles fans to play the track as it was beamed to the distant star. The event marked the third time a song had ever been intentionally transmitted into deep space, and was approved by McCartney, Yoko Ono, and Apple Corps.

== Certifications ==
Region	Certification	Certified units/sales
United Kingdom (BPI) 2010 release	Silver	200,000^{‡}
^{‡} Sales+streaming figures based on certification alone.

== Cover versions ==
=== David Bowie version ===
"Across the Universe"

Song by David Bowie

from the album Young Americans
- Released: 7 March 1975
- Recorded: c. 12–15 January 1975
- Studio: Electric Lady, New York
- Genre: Blue-eyed soul
- Length: 4:29
- Label: RCA
- Songwriter: Lennon–McCartney
- Producers: David Bowie, Harry Maslin

"Across the Universe" was covered by English singer-songwriter David Bowie in 1975 on his ninth studio album Young Americans. He recorded his cover at Electric Lady Studios in New York City in January 1975, on the same day as "Fame". A blue-eyed soul reworking, his cover is notable for featuring Lennon on guitar and backing vocals. The cover also features Carlos Alomar and Earl Slick on guitar and backing vocals, Emir Ksasan on bass guitar, and Dennis Davis on drums.

Reflecting on his contribution, Lennon later said: "I thought, great, because I'd never done a good version of that song myself. It's one of my favourite songs, but I didn't like my version of it." Bowie concurred, calling the Beatles' original version "very watery" and wanting to "hammer the hell out of it."

Bowie's cover of "Across the Universe" has received predominantly negative reviews from music critics and biographers. Douglas Wolk of Pitchfork calls it "the album's one genuine embarrassment, Vegas-y and bathetic." Biographer Chris O'Leary agrees, calling it "one of his most utterly tasteless recordings." Author Peter Doggett similarly describes it as "bombastic", "mannered", and a "bizarre way of impressing Lennon." Despite being generally regarded as one of Bowie's low points in his "golden years", biographer Nicholas Pegg gave the recording a positive review, calling it "exquisitely beautiful".

==== Personnel ====
According to Chris O'Leary:

- David Bowie – lead and backing vocals
- John Lennon – acoustic guitar, backing vocals
- Carlos Alomar – rhythm guitar
- Earl Slick – lead guitar
- Emir Ksasan – bass
- Dennis Davis – drums

Technical

- David Bowie – producer
- Harry Maslin – producer
- Eddie Kramer – engineer

=== Other versions ===
The song was released as a single in 1988 from album Let It Be by Laibach with a music video appearing in next year.

In 1998, Fiona Apple recorded and released the song as part of the Pleasantville motion picture soundtrack. Pitchfork named it Apple's best cover, highlighting how it suits the film.

In 2002, Rufus Wainwright recorded a cover version for the film I Am Sam. In 2017, the song reached number 71 on the midweek UK Singles Chart Update.

In 2005, Alicia Keys, Alison Krauss, Billie Joe Armstrong, Bono, Brian Wilson, Norah Jones, Steven Tyler, Stevie Wonder, Tim McGraw and Velvet Revolver performed a cover at the 47th Grammy Awards. The performance was recorded as a tribute to the 2004 tsunami victims. It was released on 13 February 2005 and debuted at number 22 on the Billboard Hot 100 chart as a digital download.

In 2011, Beady Eye released a cover of "Across the Universe" as a charity single available to download through their website from 4 April 2011 until 17 April 2011. All proceeds from the sale of the track went directly toward the British Red Cross Japan Tsunami Appeal. The single charted at #88 in the UK.

In 2019, Norwegian singer Aurora recorded a Like a Version for Australian radio station Triple J. In 2023, the cover placed 86th in the Hottest 100 of Like a Version.
