= Stella McCartney =

English fashion designer (born 1971)

Stella McCartney CBE
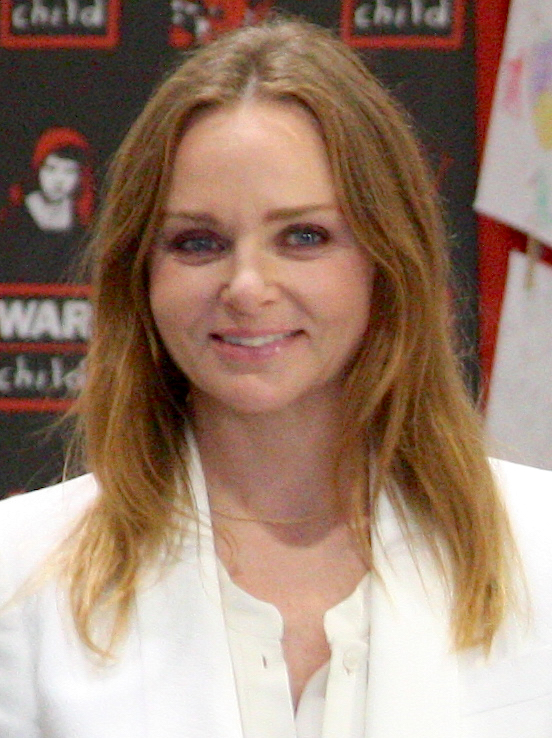
- McCartney in 2014
- Born: Stella Nina McCartney; 13 September 1971 (age 55); Camberwell, London, England
- Education: Ravensbourne University London
- Occupation: Fashion designer
- Spouse: Alasdhair Willis (m. 2003)
- Children: 4
- Parents: Paul McCartney (father); Linda McCartney (mother)
- Relatives: Mary McCartney (sister); James McCartney (brother); Heather McCartney (maternal half-sister); Beatrice McCartney (paternal half-sister); Mike McCartney (paternal uncle); Lee Eastman (maternal grandfather); Rose Frisch (maternal great-aunt)

Stella Nina McCartney (born 13 September 1971) is an English fashion designer. She is the daughter of English musician Paul McCartney and American photographer and activist Linda McCartney. McCartney is most widely known for her self-titled fashion label, Stella McCartney, which began in 1997. Prior to the launch of her brand, she worked and learned from a series of renowned luxury and haute couture designers and their respective labels. McCartney is an environmentalist and active supporter of animal rights, often basing her designs around vegan production methods. In addition to her self-titled brand, McCartney has designed in collaboration with Adidas since 2004.

== Early life ==
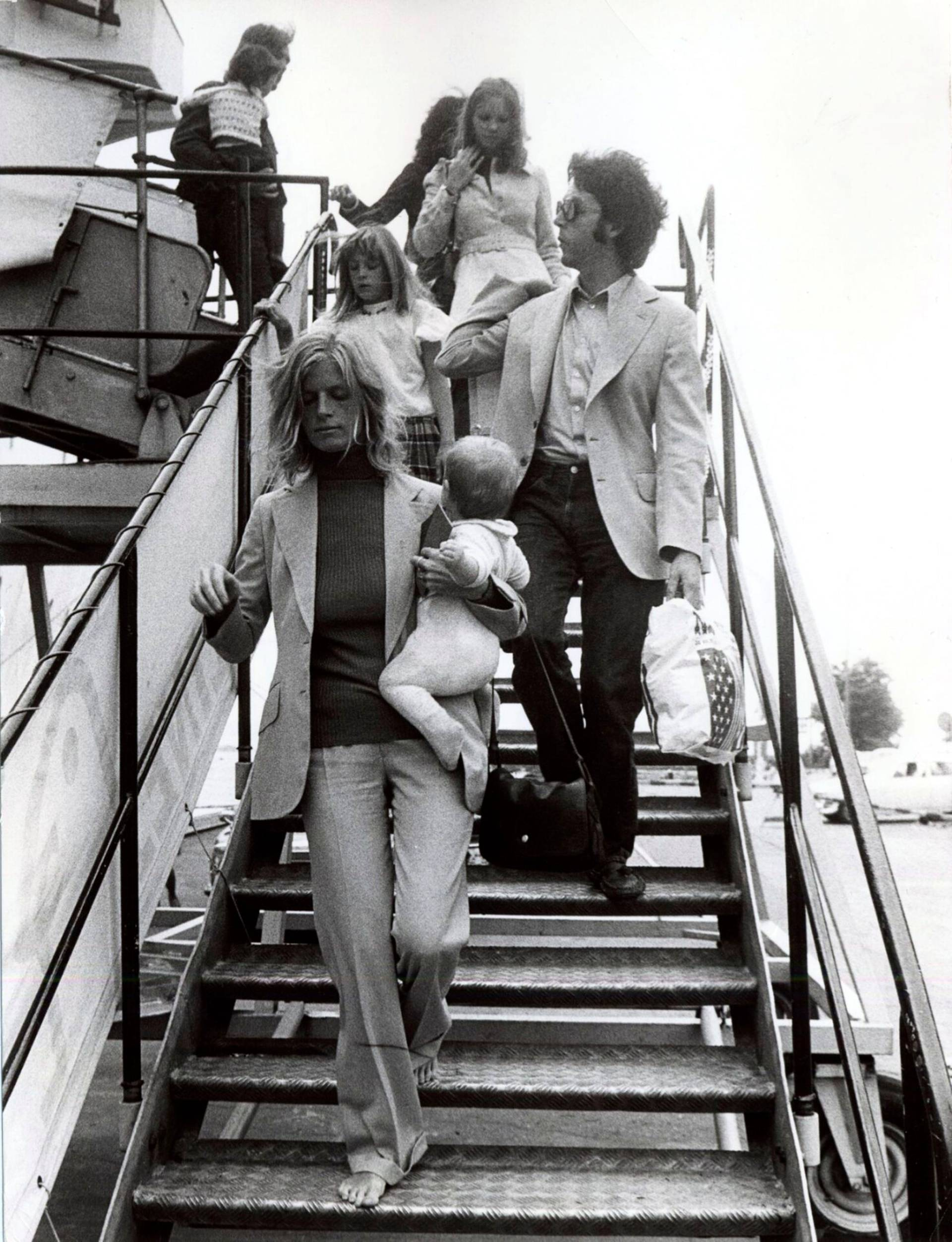
Wings arriving in Finland, August 1972: Linda McCartney is seen carrying baby Stella.

Stella Nina McCartney was born on 13 September 1971 at King's College Hospital in Denmark Hill, Camberwell, London. She was named after her maternal great‑grandmothers, both of whom were called Stella. As a child, McCartney travelled internationally with her parents and their band Wings, alongside her siblings: older half-sister Heather, who was legally adopted by Paul; older sister Mary; and younger brother James. According to her father, the band's name was inspired by Stella's difficult delivery. While she was being born by emergency caesarean section, Paul waited outside the operating theatre and prayed that she would arrive "on the wings of an angel".

Despite their public profile, the McCartneys sought to give their children as ordinary an upbringing as possible. Stella and her siblings therefore attended local state schools in East Sussex, including Bexhill College. McCartney has said that she experienced bullying while at state school, and has also acknowledged that she had bullied others.

== Career ==
=== Beginning ===
McCartney became interested in clothing design at a young age. At 13, she created her first jacket. Three years later, she undertook an internship with Christian Lacroix, contributing to her first haute couture collection, and subsequently refined her skills while working for Edward Sexton, her father's Savile Row tailor, for several years.

She completed her foundation studies at Ravensbourne College of Design and Communication, now Ravensbourne University London, before studying fashion design at Central Saint Martins in the early 1990s, graduating in 1995. Her graduation collection was modelled without fee by friends and supermodels Naomi Campbell, Yasmin Le Bon, and Kate Moss, at the college's runway show, which was presented to a song written especially for the occasion by her father, "Stella May Day".

A lifelong vegetarian, McCartney uses no leather or fur in her designs. In 2015, The Guardian described her as a "consistent and vocal" supporter of animal rights. Several of her designs feature text that reinforces her "no animal" policy; one Adidas jacket includes a sleeve printed with "suitable for sporty vegetarians". A pair of her vinyl and ultrasuede boots was marketed as vegan-friendly, although her reliance on oil-based synthetics still prompted ecological concerns.

=== Rise to prominence ===
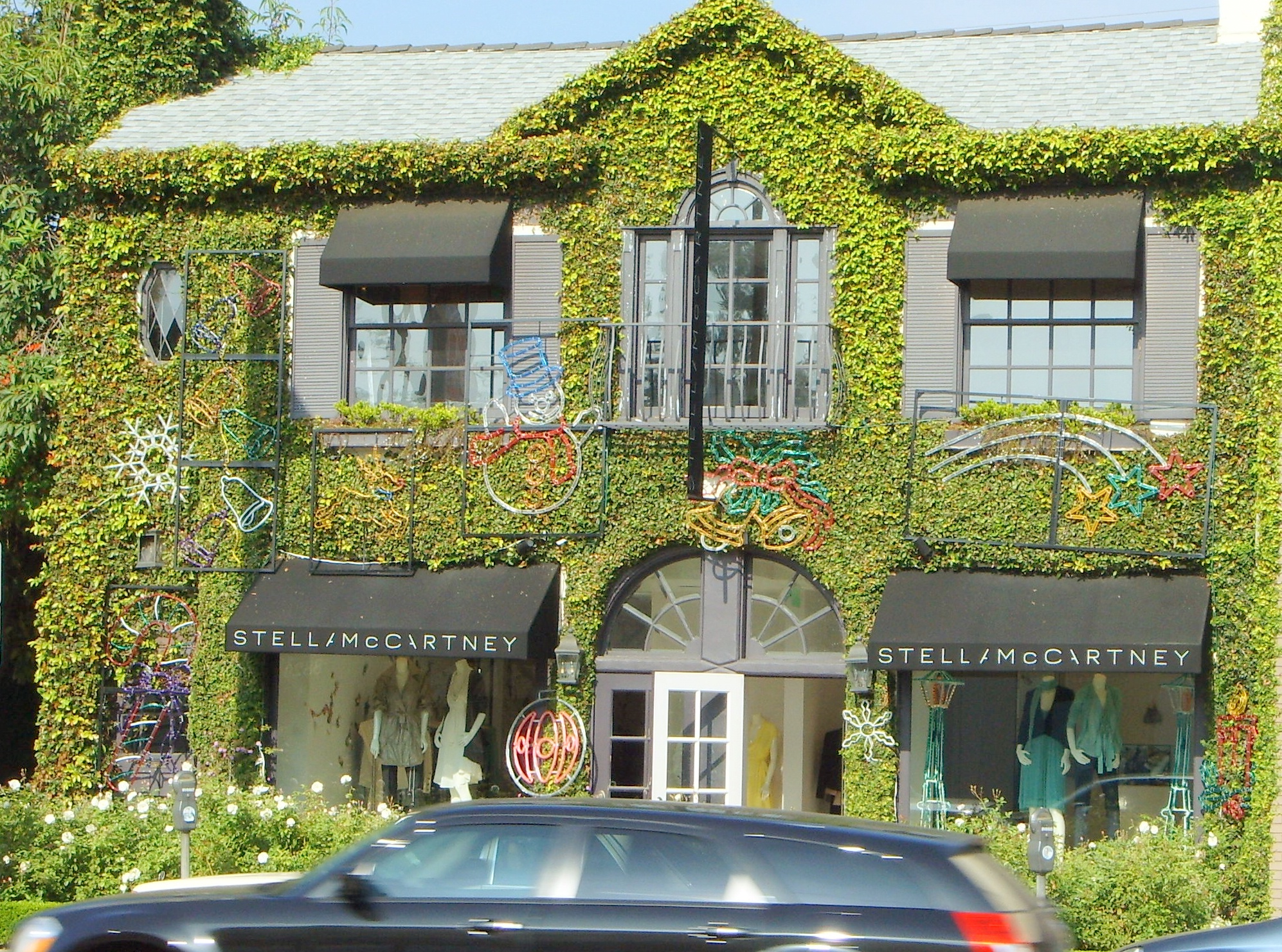
Stella McCartney's store in West Hollywood

In 1997, McCartney was named creative director of Chloé, a position she held until 2001. That year, she launched her eponymous fashion house in a joint venture with the Gucci Group (now Kering) and presented her first collection in Paris. She now operates 51 freestanding stores in locations including Manhattan's Soho, London's Mayfair, LA's West Hollywood, Paris's Palais Royal, Barcelona's Passeig de Gracia, Milan, Rome, Miami and Houston, among others.

In 2003, McCartney launched her first perfume, Stella. In January 2007, she introduced a 100% organic skincare line, CARE, comprising seven products ranging from a cleansing milk made with lemon balm and apricot to a floral water containing green tea and linden blossom. In 2008, she launched a lingerie line with the Bendon Group, followed in November 2010 by the Stella McCartney Kids collection for newborns and children up to age 12.

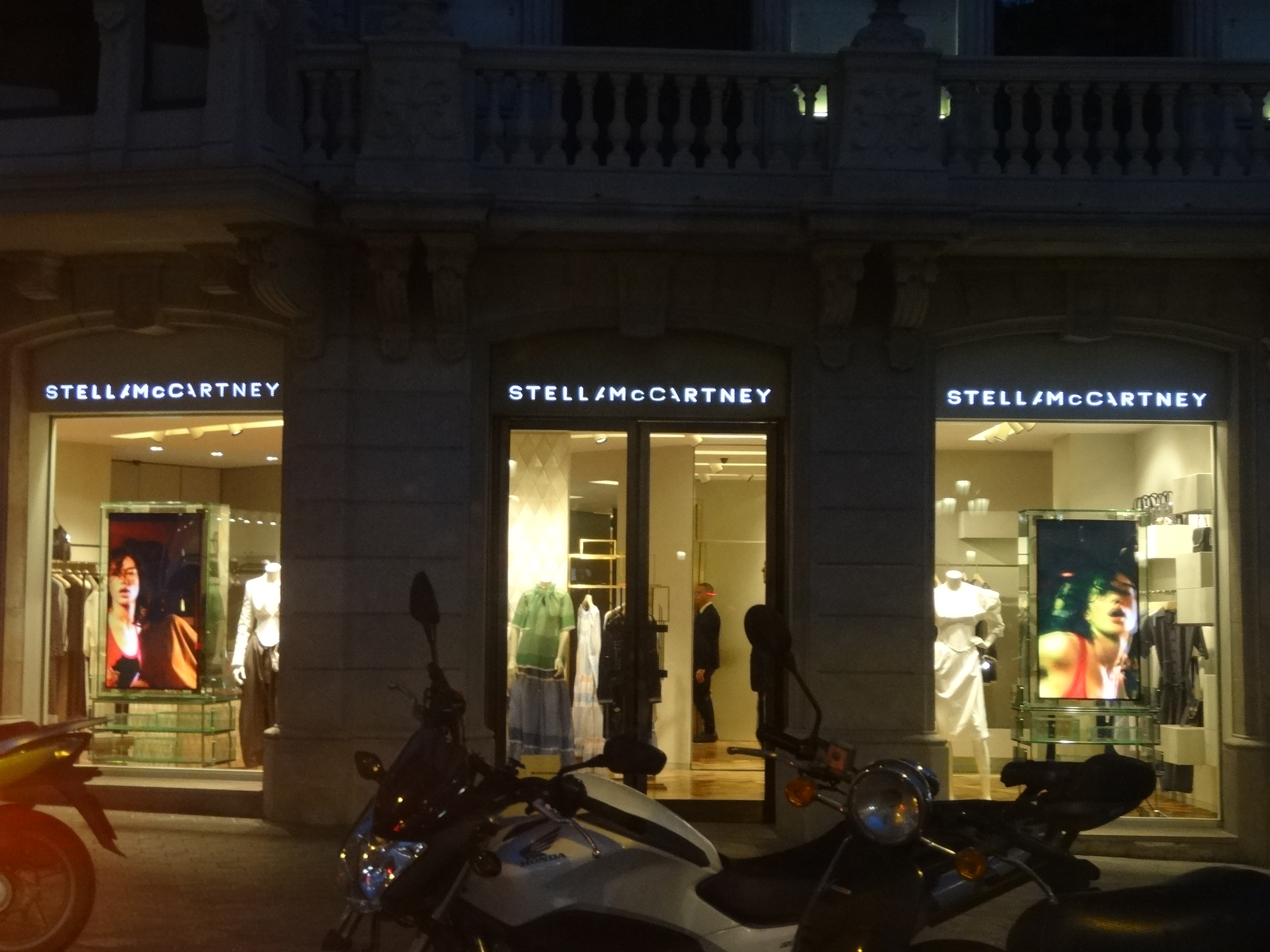
Stella McCartney's store in Passeig de Gràcia, Barcelona

In June 2012, McCartney invited the Soul Rebels Brass Band to perform at her 2013 spring presentation at the New York Marble Cemetery. Guests included Anne Hathaway, Jim Carrey, Anna Wintour, Annie Leibovitz, Lauren Hutton, Amy Poehler, Solange Knowles, P'Trique, Greta Gerwig and André Leon Talley. Also in 2012, she contributed to The Sustainable Fashion Handbook. In November 2016, she launched her first menswear collection, featuring athleisure and pyjama-inspired casual pieces; she cited her father and the comedian Jethro as influences.

In April 2018, after 17 years of partnership with Kering, McCartney purchased its stake in her company and assumed full control of her global fashion house. The following year, she entered a strategic partnership with LVMH. She designed the wedding‑reception dress worn by Meghan Markle and later created 46 replicas for her "Made With Love" capsule collection, each priced at £3,500.

On 15 October 2018, McCartney launched the Stella McCartney Cares Foundation, a breast‑cancer charity established in memory of her mother, Linda, who died in 1998. The foundation aimed to donate 1,000 Louis Listening post‑operative mastectomy compression bras to women undergoing treatment. On 21 November 2021, she released "The Beatles: Get Back", a collection inspired by the Beatles. In 2023, she performed a spoken-word piece at the Coronation Concert for Charles III and Camilla.

In January 2025, Stella McCartney repurchased the minority stake in her eponymous fashion house that had been held by LVMH, marking a return to full independent ownership. The 49% stake had been acquired by LVMH in 2019, following McCartney's earlier buyback of her stake from Kering. McCartney's management and LVMH issued a joint statement describing the transaction as a way for the designer to "write a new page" independently, while noting that she will continue to advise the conglomerate's executive team on sustainability issues as a global ambassador.

=== Collaborations ===
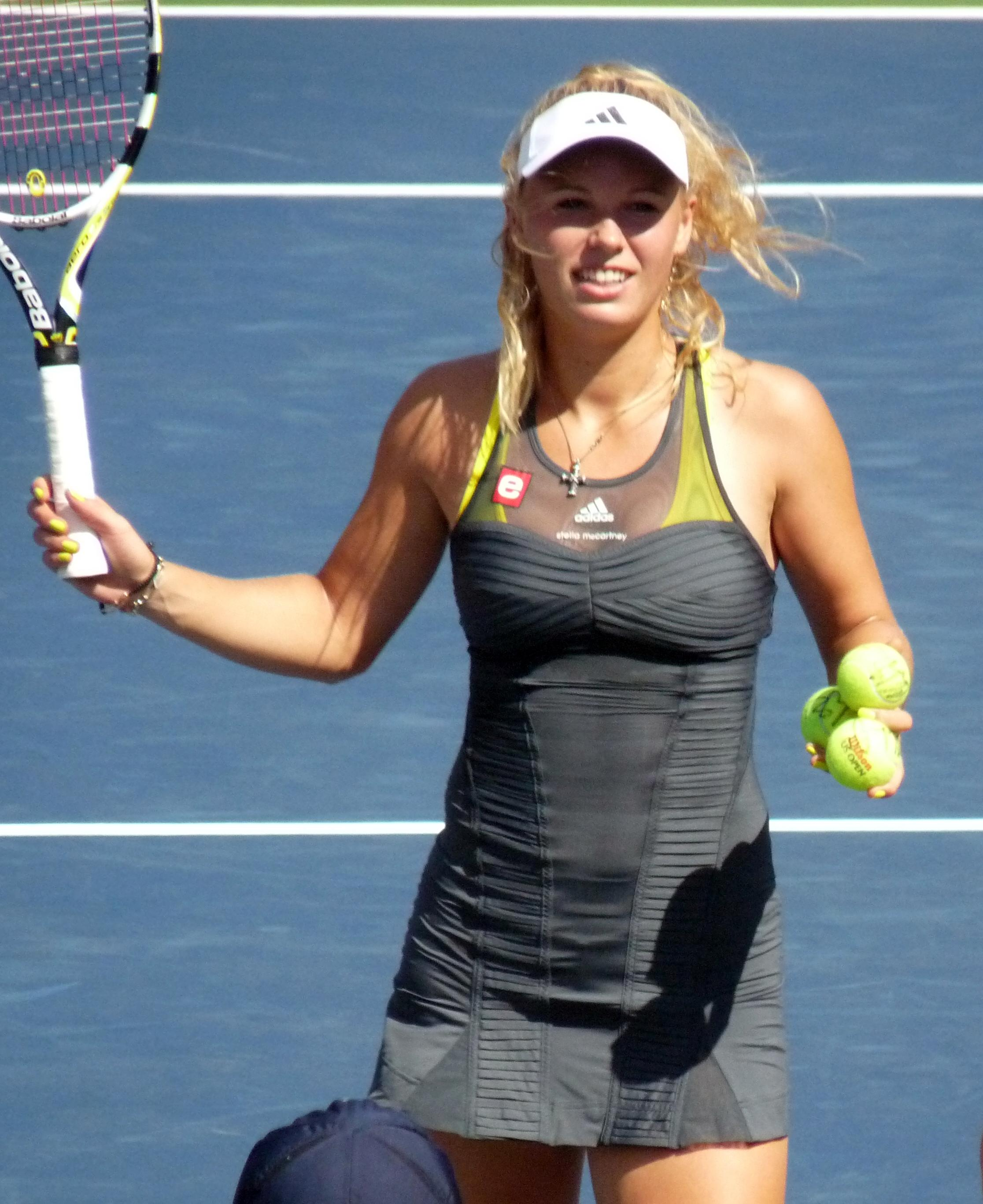
"Stella McCartney"–branded dress worn by Caroline Wozniacki at the 2010 US Open

McCartney launched a joint-venture line with Adidas in September 2004, establishing a long‑term partnership with the corporation. The collaboration produced a women's sports‑performance collection. In January 2010, she announced a jewellery collaboration with Disney inspired by Alice in Wonderland. In July that year, working with People for the Ethical Treatment of Animals (PETA) and eco-designer Atom cianfarani, McCartney petitioned the British Ministry of Defence to end the use of Canadian black bears for the fur on the guards' hats; the military has yet to make the change.

In July 2011, McCartney appeared on the catwalk at The Brandery fashion show in Barcelona. In December 2018, she announced the launch of a new fashion-industry charter for climate action, created in collaboration with the United Nations to encourage sustainable business practices. In August 2019, American singer-songwriter Taylor Swift partnered with McCartney on a fashion line inspired by Swift's seventh studio album, Lover, released under the title "Stella X Taylor Swift".

=== Team GB ===
In September 2010, McCartney was appointed Team GB's Creative Director for the 2012 Olympics by Adidas – the first time in the Games' history that a leading fashion designer created the apparel for a country's athletes across all competitions for both the Olympic and Paralympic Games. The Team GB kit was publicly unveiled in March 2012. McCartney continued in this role for the 2016 Summer Olympics.

== Personal life ==
McCartney married British publisher Alasdhair Willis on 30 August 2003 at Mount Stuart House on the Isle of Bute. Her wedding dress was an updated version of the dress worn by her mother in 1969. The couple have four children. Her children later appeared with her on the cover of Vogue. Willis was named creative director of Adidas in March 2022.

McCartney has a younger half-sister, born in 2003 to her father and his second wife, Heather Mills. In 2018, McCartney said: "When my mum died in 1998, Dad, my brother and I went to see the Maharishi... I had quite a reaction that I didn't feel in control of. I possibly suppressed my emotions and I started having panic attacks, physical reactions to that loss." She added that transcendental meditation made an almost immediate difference to her ability to cope, stating: "It really did help me at a time when I really needed some help."

In 2023, McCartney's plan to build a house in a remote part of Scotland, which involved cutting down trees, received more than 50 objections to the local council, many on environmental grounds.

== Honours, awards and media ==
McCartney received the VH1/Vogue Designer of the Year award in 2000 in New York. Her father Paul presented the award to her; she thanked him in her acceptance speech and dedicated the award to her late mother Linda. This was followed by the Woman of Courage Award for work against cancer at the prestigious Unforgettable Evening event (2003, Los Angeles), the Glamour Award for Best Designer of the Year (2004, London), the Star Honoree at the Fashion Group International Night of the Stars (2004, New York), the Organic Style Woman of the Year Award (2005, New York), the Elle Style Award for Best Designer of the Year Award (2007, London), Best Designer of the Year at the British Style Awards (2007, London), Best Designer of The Year at the Spanish Elle Awards (2008, Barcelona), and the Green Designer of the Year at the ACE Awards (2008, New York).

In 2009, she was honoured by the NRDC, featured in the Time 100 and recognised as Glamour Woman of the Year. In November 2011, she was presented with the Red Carpet Award by the British Fashion Council; and in the 2013 New Year Honours, she was appointed Officer of the Order of the British Empire (OBE) for services to fashion. In 2012, McCartney was among the British cultural icons selected by artist Sir Peter Blake to appear in a new version of his artwork – the album cover for The Beatles' Sgt. Pepper's Lonely Hearts Club Band – to celebrate the British cultural figures of his life that he most admires. The same year, McCartney won the 'Designer of the Year' and the 'Designer Brand' awards at the Fashion Awards.

In February 2013 she was assessed as one of the 100 most powerful women in the United Kingdom by Woman's Hour on BBC Radio 4. In June 2017, McCartney appeared on BBC Radio 4's Desert Island Discs, selecting "Road to Nowhere" by Talking Heads and "Blackbird" by the Beatles, and her favourite "God Only Knows" by the Beach Boys. She would later receive the Special Recognition Award for Innovation at the 2017 Fashion Awards She was appointed Commander of the Order of the British Empire (CBE) in the 2022 Birthday Honours in recognition of her services to fashion and sustainability. In 2024, PETA named McCartney their "Person of the Year," citing her work as a designer to "embrace creative, animal-friendly materials."

== Bibliography ==
Vegan cookery

- McCartney, Linda (with Paul, Mary, and Stella McCartney). Linda McCartney's Family Kitchen: Over 90 Plant-Based Recipes to Save the Planet and Nourish the Soul. (Voracious/Little, Brown, and Co., 2021) ISBN 978-0-316-49798-5
