= Grace Wyshak =

American biostatistician (1927–2024)

- Born: August 31, 1927; Chestnut Hill, MA
- Died: September 12, 2024 (aged 97)
- Education: Smith College; Harvard University; Yale University
- Scientific career
- Fields: Biostatistics

Grace G. Wyshak (August 31, 1927 – September 12, 2024) was an American biostatistician known for her work on twins and heritability of genetic information and in defining the factors impacting girls as they develop into young women. She held a position at the Harvard T.H. Chan School of Public Health.

== Education and career ==
Wyshak graduated from Smith College in 1949, and from Harvard University in 1956. She earned her Ph.D. in public health (biometry) from Yale University. From 1975, Wyshak was an associate professor in public health at Yale University. At Harvard University she served in the Department of Social Medicine and Health Policy. She was also a corresponding member of the Faculty of Psychiatry in the Cambridge Health Alliance, a Harvard-affiliated teaching hospital in Cambridge. From 2022, Wyshak was a senior scientist at the Harvard T.H. Chan School of Public Health.

== Research ==
Wyshak's epidemiological research helped clarify observed relationships between physical activity (exercise) and reduced breast cancer and depression risks. While at Yale, Wyshak used twins as a model to examine survival statistics for twins and to examine inheritance of genes. She also investigated people's willingness to engage in risky behavior, a topic she examined based on a comparison between doctors and lawyers.

Wyshak and Rose Frisch's collaborative work determined that exercise reduced risk of certain cancers, and that drinking carbonated beverages increased the likelihood of bone fractures in young girls. Wyshak went on to investigate the link between soda consumption by adolescent girls and bone fractures, research that was broadly covered by the media. Her research also demonstrated that female athletes have a reduced risk of breast cancer in their later years, she uncovered historical shifts in the age of menstruation for girls, and examined delayed menstruation in young ballerinas.

== Death ==
Wyshak died on September 12, 2024, at the age of 97.

== Selected publications ==
- Wyshak, Grace (1961). Cardiacs and Diabetics in Industry: A Study in Work Experience. Thomas.
- White, Colin; Wyshak, Grace (1964-11-05). "Inheritance in Human Dizygotic Twinning". New England Journal of Medicine. 271 (19): 1003–1005. doi:10.1056/NEJM196411052711908. ISSN 0028-4793. PMID 14198054.
- Wyshak, Grace; Frisch, Rose E. (1982-04-29). "Evidence for a Secular Trend in Age of Menarche". New England Journal of Medicine. 306 (17): 1033–1035. doi:10.1056/NEJM198204293061707. ISSN 0028-4793. PMID 7062994.
- Wyshak, Grace; Honeyman, Merton S.; Flannery, John T.; Beck, Alice S. (1983). "Cancer in Mothers of Dizygotic Twins2". JNCI: Journal of the National Cancer Institute. doi:10.1093/jnci/70.4.593. ISSN 1460-2105.
- Barsky, Arthur J.; Wyshak, Grace; Klerman, Gerald L. (1990). "The Somatosensory Amplification Scale and its relationship to hypochondriasis". Journal of Psychiatric Research. 24 (4): 323–334. doi:10.1016/0022-3956(90)90004-A. PMID 2090830.
- Wyshak, Grace; Frisch, Rose E. (1994). "Carbonated beverages, dietary calcium, the dietary calcium/phosphorus ratio, and bone fractures in girls and boys". Journal of Adolescent Health. 15 (3): 210–215. doi:10.1016/1054-139X(94)90506-1. PMID 8075091.
- Wyshak, Grace (2000-06-01). "Teenaged Girls, Carbonated Beverage Consumption, and Bone Fractures". Archives of Pediatrics & Adolescent Medicine. 154 (6): 610–613. doi:10.1001/archpedi.154.6.610. ISSN 1072-4710. PMID 10850510.
