= Priscilla Frisch =

American astronomer (1943–2025)

- Born: Priscilla Diane Chapman; November 13, 1943; Los Angeles, California, U.S.
- Died: April 2, 2025 (aged 81); Chicago, Illinois, U.S.
- Occupations: Astronomer, college professor
- Relatives: David H. Frisch (father-in-law); Rose Frisch (mother-in-law)

Priscilla Diane Chapman Frisch (November 13, 1943 – April 2, 2025) was an American astronomer. She was a senior scientist in astronomy and astrophysics at the University of Chicago. She worked with NASA on two unmanned missions to explore beyond the solar system.

== Early life and education ==
Frisch was born in Los Angeles, the daughter of Richard Courtney Chapman Jr. and Patricia Blasdel Chapman. Frisch first learned to rock climb at CU Boulder, where she studied before transferring to the University of California, Berkeley. There, she served as the president of the Berkeley Hiking club. At Berkeley, she earned a bachelor's degree in 1966, and a Ph.D. in astronomy in 1977 with a dissertation titled "The Scorpius-Ophiuchus Diffuse Interstellar Cloud".

== Career ==
Frisch began working at the University of Chicago Laboratory of Space and Astronomy in 1974. She studied the heliosphere and the interstellar medium, "the wispy matter that lies between stars". She worked with NASA on the Interstellar Boundary Explorer (IBEX) and on the Interstellar Mapping and Acceleration Probe. Frisch published over 160 research papers, in scientific journals including The Astrophysical Journal, Science, Space Science Reviews, Journal of Geophysical Research, Advances in Space Research, and Astronomy & Astrophysics.

To study the magnetic-field orientation of the region of space surrounding the Northern and Southern Hemispheres, Priscilla compiled a program in 2005 that observed and recorded polarized-starlight measurements from those regions. Using these observations as a starting point, Frisch published analyses demonstrating that weak polarization form nearby stars can be utilized to trace the local interstellar magnetic field and constraining how that field helps shape the heliosphere, later comparing polarization derived fields directions with IBEX “Ribbon” measurements to refine the field orientation near the sun.

Frisch also contributed to multidisciplinary synthesis research on the larger galactic context of the heliosphere. In addition to compiling research from various disciplines, including astronomy, heliophysics, and space science, she edited volume 338 of Solar Journey: "The Significance of Our Galactic Environment for the Heliosphere and Earth (2006)" on how changes in local interstellar conditions may impact heliospheric structure and the nearby space around Earth.

== Scientific Contributions and Impact ==
Over more than four decades, Priscilla Frisch researched the interaction between the solar system and the heliosphere (region surrounding the solar system), choosing to focus on the heliosphere’s structure and dynamics. Across her 160 publications, her work consistently examined the physical properties of nearby interstellar matter such as gas velocity distributions, ionization states, and the role of dust and magnetic fields in shaping heliospheric boundaries.

In the early 2000s, she began using observations of polarized starlight from nearby stars to study the orientation of the local interstellar magnetic field, and she was later able to prove that even weak polarization signals could be used to deduce the structure of this field. These results were combined with data from NASA’s Interstellar Boundary Explorer (IBEX) mission, and they greatly contributed to refinements in models describing the heliosphere’s interaction with its environment. Several of her papers such as “Morphology and Ionization of the Interstellar Cloud Surrounding the Solar System” (1994) and “Characteristics of nearby interstellar matter” (1995) are frequently cited in heliophysics literature and contributed to establishing observational constraints used in later space missions. As editor of Solar Journey: The Significance of Our Galactic Environment for the Heliosphere and Earth (2006), she integrated observational data with theoretical models to see how changes in the Sun’s galactic environment may influence heliospheric structure and near-Earth space conditions.

Overall, her work helped contribute to a broader understanding in heliophysics and space weather research. It is cited in numerous studies and it continues to inform models used in current and planned space missions investigating the solar system’s galactic environment.

== Publications ==
- "High-resolution observations of the Lyman alpha sky background" (1977, with T. F. Adams)
- "The physical properties of the 'local fluff'" (1986)
- "Morphology and Ionization of the Interstellar Cloud Surrounding the Solar System" (1994)
- "Characteristics of nearby interstellar matter" (1995)
- "Consequences of a change in the galactic environment of the Sun" (1999, with Gary P. Zank)
- "Dust in the Local Interstellar Wind" (1999, with fifteen other authors)
- "The galactic environment of the Sun" (2000)
- "The Velocity Distribution of the Nearest Interstellar Gas" (2002, with Lauren Grodnicki and Daniel E. Welty)
- "The Ionization of Nearby Interstellar Gas" (2002, with Jonathan D. Slavin)
- "The chemical composition and gas-to-dust mass ratio of nearby interstellar matter" (2003, with Jonathan D. Slavin)
- "Heliospheric Response to Different Possible Interstellar Environments" (2006, with Hans-Reinhard Mueller, Vladimir Florinski, and Gary P. Zank)
- Solar Journey: The Significance of Our Galactic Environment for the Heliosphere and Earth (2006, editor)
- "The boundary conditions of the heliosphere: photoionization models constrained by interstellar and in situ data" (2008, with J. D. Slavin)
- "The Interstellar Medium Surrounding the Sun" (2011, with Seth Redfield and Jonathan D. Slavin)
- "Whence the interstellar magnetic field shaping the heliosphere?" (2022, with 17 other authors)

== Personal life ==
Frisch was involved in various athletic activities, including hiking, climbing, and folk-dancing. When the male members of the Berkeley Hiking Club went on a hike without inviting the women, Frisch scaled the Berkeley Sather Tower, which rises 307 feet. With her sister assisting as a belayer, she secured a large red bow around the spire. In August of 1994, Frisch reunited with Berkeley Hiking Club members at the club’s reunion near Boulder, CO. She and other members from the 60s were photographed by Helen McGinnis, and Frisch is listed under photographs as Pris Chapman Frisch.

Chapman married physicist Henry J. Frisch; his parents David H. Frisch and Rose Frisch were both noted scientists. Frisch gave birth to her first daughter in 1974, the same year she was granted her own office in the UChicago Laboratory of Space and Astronomy building in the Enrico Fermi Institute. She had her second daughter in 1977. She died in 2025, at the age of 81, at her home in Hyde Park, Chicago. She is survived by her husband, two daughters, and three grandchildren.
