= Rose Frisch =

American fertility researcher (1918–2015)

Rose Epstein Frisch
- Frisch in the early 1980's
- Born: Rose Epstein; July 7, 1918; The Bronx, New York City, United States
- Died: January 30, 2015 (aged 96); Cambridge, Massachusetts, USA
- Education: Smith College (B.A.); Columbia University (M.S.); University of Wisconsin (Ph.D.)
- Known for: discovery of leptin; work in infertility, specifically her discovery that low body fat was a contributing factor to infertility
- Spouse: David H. Frisch
- Relatives: Lee Eastman (brother); Linda McCartney (niece); Priscilla Frisch (daughter-in-law); Heather McCartney (grandniece); Mary McCartney (grandniece); Stella McCartney (grandniece); James McCartney (grandnephew)
- Awards: Guggenheim Fellowship – 1975–1976 Sigma Xi national lecturer – 1988–1990 Fellow of the Bunting Institute – 1993–1994; Fellow of the American Academy of Arts and Sciences; Rally Day Medal for Medical Research and Reproductive Health (awarded by Smith College) Professor Emeritus Award of Merit, Harvard School of Public Health
- Scientific career
- Fields: Women's health, women's biology, leptin, obesity, fat, infertility, public health, population health, biology
- Workplaces: Manhattan Project at Los Alamos National Laboratory, Los Alamos, NM; Harvard School of Public Health
- Website: www.hsph.harvard.edu/news/features/in-memoriam-rose-epstein-frisch-expert-in-womens-fertility-2/

Rose Epstein Frisch (born Rose Epstein; July 7, 1918 – January 30, 2015) was a pioneering American scientist in fertility and human development whose work was instrumental in the discovery of leptin. She researched infertility and discovered that low body fat is a contributing factor to infertility.

== Early life and education ==
She was born Rose Epstein in 1918, in the Bronx, to Russian-Jewish immigrants Louis and Stella Epstein. Her brother Lee Eastman (born Leopold Vail Epstein) is Linda McCartney's father. Frisch attended Smith College in Northampton, Massachusetts, where she received a Bachelor of Arts in 1939. She earned her master's degree in zoology the following year at Columbia University, and her Ph.D. in genetics from the University of Wisconsin in 1943. She met her husband, David H. Frisch, while she was at Smith and he was at Princeton. The two worked on the atomic bomb project at Los Alamos National Laboratory during the second World War.

== Research ==
Focusing on the role of adipose tissue (fat) in fertility, Frisch discovered that low body fat (under 17%) could cause infertility, late menarche, and oligomenorrhea. This discovery was published in the journal Science in 1974. In her work with Grace Wyshak she also discovered that athletes were at lower risk of breast cancer.

Frisch began her research career as a doctoral student at the University of Wisconsin, where she worked with Drosophila melanogaster. After her doctorate, she became a human computer for the Manhattan Project. Once her children were older, she took a research position at the Harvard Center for Population and Development Studies in Cambridge, Massachusetts. Frisch remained at Harvard for the rest of her career, studying swimmers, dancers, and other athletes to learn how body fat affects fertility and the propensity for diseases such as breast cancer.

Before her death, Frisch was involved with the Cambridge-based Center for Population and Development Studies of the Harvard T.H. Chan School of Public Health.

== Legacy ==
Frisch was widely respected by athletic women, who were often able to achieve a pregnancy in part by applying knowledge gathered from her research.

== Honors and awards ==
- Guggenheim Fellowship – 1975–1976
- Sigma Xi national lecturer – 1988–1990
- Fellow of the Bunting Institute – 1993–1994
- Fellow of the American Academy of Arts and Sciences
- Rally Day Medal for Medical Research and Reproductive Health (awarded by Smith College)
- Professor Emeritus Award of Merit, Harvard School of Public Health

== Selected publications ==
- Frisch RE, McArthur JW (1974). "Menstrual cycles: fatness as a determinant of minimum weight for height necessary for their maintenance or onset". Science. 185 (4155): 949–51. Bibcode:1974Sci...185..949F. doi:10.1126/science.185.4155.949. PMID 4469672. S2CID 25005866.
- Frisch RE, Wyshak G, Albright NL, Albright TE, Schiff I, Jones KP, Witschi J, Shiang E, Koff E, Marguglio M (1985). "Lower prevalence of breast cancer and cancers of the reproductive system among former college athletes compared to non-athletes". Br. J. Cancer. 52 (6): 885–91. doi:10.1038/bjc.1985.273. PMC 1977263. PMID 4074640.
- Frisch, Rose E. (2004). Female fertility and the body fat connection (Paperback ed.). Chicago, Ill.: University of Chicago Press. ISBN 9780226265469.
- Frisch, Rose E. Plants that Feed the World. (1966). Van Nostrand; First Edition (1966). ASIN: B0000CNBFC - children’s book on nutrition
- Frisch, Rose E. (Ed.). Adipose Tissue and Reproduction (March 1990). S Karger Publishers. ISBN 978-3805550666.

== See also ==
- Linda McCartney
