= Lee Eastman =

American attorney and art collector, father of Linda McCartney (1910–91)

- Lee Eastman (left) and his wife Monique in 1987
- Born: Leopold Vail Epstein; January 12, 1910; New York City, U.S.
- Died: July 30, 1991 (aged 81); New York City, U.S.
- Occupation: Show business lawyer
- Spouses: Louise Lindner (div. 1962); Monique de T. Schless
- Children: 4, including Linda
- Relatives: Rose Frisch (sister); Paul McCartney (son-in-law); Heather McCartney (granddaughter); Mary McCartney (granddaughter); Stella McCartney (granddaughter); James McCartney (grandson)

Lee Eastman (born Leopold Vail Epstein; January 12, 1910 – July 30, 1991) was an American show business lawyer and art collector from New York City.

One of his four children was Linda McCartney, the first wife of former Beatle Paul McCartney. Eastman became McCartney's business manager shortly before the breakup of The Beatles, while his son John Eastman represented McCartney during his 1970 lawsuit to dissolve the group legally. He is the maternal grandfather of potter Heather McCartney, photographer Mary McCartney, fashion designer Stella McCartney, and musician/sculptor James McCartney. Eastman was also the friend and longtime lawyer for and collector of the works of the abstract expressionist painter Willem de Kooning. His sister Rose Frisch became a noted scientist who worked on issues of women's fertility and population studies. His family was Jewish.

== Involvement with Apple Corps ==
When the Beatles' company Apple Corps was in business trouble early in 1969, Eastman and Allen Klein were both considered to take the reins of the company, and of the band's careers. John Lennon favoured Klein. Lennon was impressed that Klein knew and understood Lennon's lyrics, and called Klein very intelligent. McCartney wanted Eastman, but was out-voted 3–1, as George Harrison and Ringo Starr sided with Lennon and Klein. For a short period, Klein managed Apple Corps and the personal careers of Lennon, Harrison, and Starr while Eastman was the corporate counsel and managed McCartney. The Klein/Eastman combination did not work, and after a contentious meeting, Eastman was out. Subsequent disagreements over decisions made by Klein and the other Beatles prompted McCartney — represented by Eastman — to sue them to dissolve the partnership, and he eventually succeeded.

Klein made some successful deals for the Beatles, and they made more money during their short tenure with Klein than they had during the years they were managed by Brian Epstein. Lennon, Harrison, and Starr eventually soured on Klein, and after a series of suits and countersuits, Klein left Apple Corps with a multimillion-dollar buyout.

== Manager of McCartney ==
Eastman and his son successfully managed McCartney's solo career, leaving McCartney the wealthiest of the former Beatles. In 1984, McCartney cited one example of advice he received from Eastman:

The music publishing I own is fabulous. Beautiful. I owe it all to Linda's dad Lee Eastman and her brother John. Linda's dad is a great business brain. He said originally, 'If you are going to invest, do it in something you know. If you invest in building computers or something, you can lose a fortune. Wouldn't you rather be in music? Stay in music.' I said, 'Yeah, I'd much rather do that.' So he asked me what kind of music I liked. And the first name I said was Buddy Holly. Lee got on to the man who owned Buddy Holly's stuff and bought that for me. So I was into publishing now."

McCartney's music publishing investments have paid off. In 1984, he estimated that half his income came from recording, and half from his music publishing business.

== Personal life ==
Eastman had four children with his first wife Louise Lindner, herself the daughter of a prominent Cleveland department store executive. Lindner died in a plane crash in 1962. He later remarried Monique de T. Schless. Eastman died of a stroke on July 30, 1991, in a New York City hospital; he was 81. His son John Eastman died on August 10, 2022, of pancreatic cancer, at the age of 83.
