= David H. Frisch =

American physicist (1918–1991)

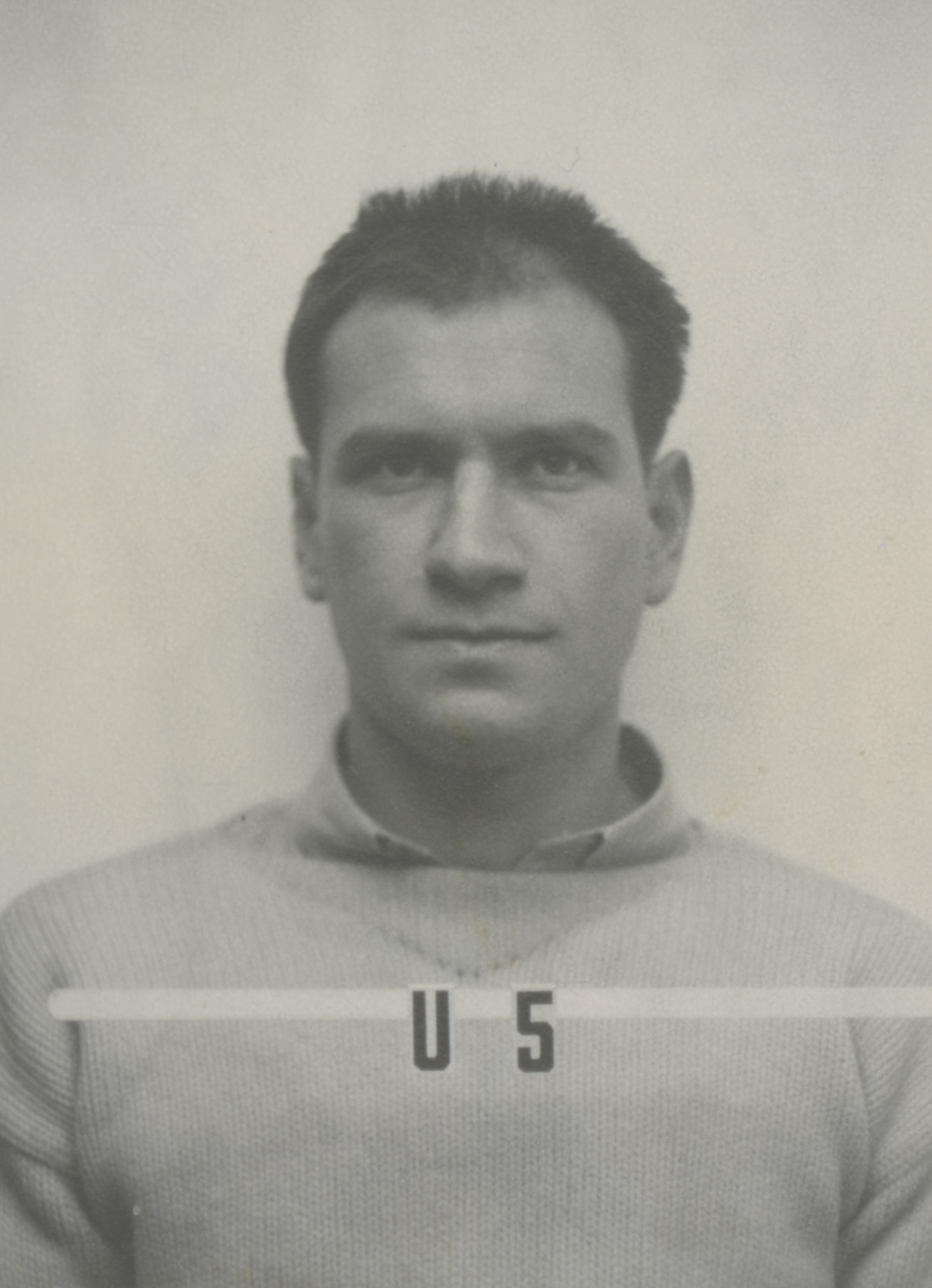
- David H. Frisch Los Alamos wartime security badge.
- Born: March 12, 1918; New York City, New York
- Died: May 23, 1991 (aged 73)
- Education: Princeton
- Known for: Helped develop the atom bomb in World War II
- Spouse: Rose Epstein Frisch
- Awards: Fellow of the American Physical Society
- Scientific career
- Fields: Physics
- Institutions: Los Alamos
- Thesis: (1947)
- Doctoral advisor: Victor Weisskopf
- Doctoral students: George Smoot

David Henry Frisch (March 12, 1918 – May 23, 1991) was an American physicist who helped develop the atom bomb in World War II and later became active in the disarmament movement. He was also the husband of Rose Epstein Frisch.

== Biography ==
Born in New York, Frisch grew up in San Antonio and graduated from Princeton in 1940. He was a graduate assistant at the University of Wisconsin–Madison from 1940 to 1942, and then worked at Los Alamos from 1943 to 1945. After the war he moved to MIT, beginning as a research associate in 1946, obtained his PhD in 1947 and was appointed an assistant professor in 1948, associate professor in 1952 and full professor in 1958. He retired in 1988.

Frisch was a fellow of the American Physical Society and of the American Academy of Arts and Sciences. He was the recipient of Fulbright, Guggenheim, Alfred P. Sloan and National Science Foundation research fellowships.

Frisch served on the Physics Advisory Committee of the National Science Foundation, on the Brookhaven High Energy Advisory Committee, and was chairman of the Long-Range Planning committee of the Fermi National Accelerator Laboratory.

Frisch was active in the field of nuclear disarmament, participating in the Moscow Pugwash Conference in 1960, editing the book Arms Reduction in 1961, and participating in the 1962 Woods Hole Summer Study on Inspection.

Among his scientific publications was a 1963 paper in which he and James H. Smith succeeded in showing objective time dilation in the decay of cosmic muons. A thirty-five-minute movie describing this experiment performed both on the top of Mount Washington in New Hampshire as well as at MIT is available online.

He was married to biologist Rose Frisch. His son, Henry Jonathan Frisch (born 1944), is a high-energy physicist and professor of physics at the University of Chicago. Henry's wife Priscilla Frisch was a noted astronomer.

== Selected publications ==
- D.H. Frisch and J.H. Smith, Am. J. Phys., 31, 342-355 (1963).
