= Linda McCartney =

American photographer and musician (1941–1998)

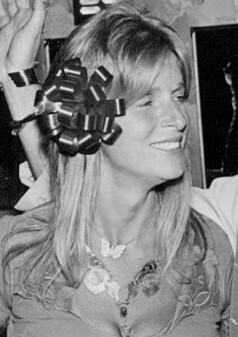
- McCartney in 1976
- Born: Linda Louise Eastman; September 24, 1941; Scarsdale, New York, U.S.
- Died: April 17, 1998 (aged 56); Tanque Verde, Arizona, U.S.
- Occupations: Photographer; musician; vegetarian cook book author; activist
- Years active: 1965–1998
- Spouses: Joseph See Jr. (m. 1962; div. 1965); Paul McCartney (m. 1969)
- Children: 4, including Mary, Stella and James
- Father: Lee Eastman
- Relatives: Rose Frisch (aunt)
- Musical career
- Instruments: Vocals; keyboards; percussion
- Formerly of: Wings; Paul McCartney Band
- Website: lindamccartney.com

Linda Louise, Lady McCartney (née Eastman; September 24, 1941 – April 17, 1998) was an American photographer, musician, cookbook author, and activist. She was the keyboardist and harmony vocalist in the band Wings, which she had formed with her husband Paul McCartney of the Beatles.

Beginning in the mid-1960s, Linda began a career as a photographer, landing with Town & Country, where she soon gained assignments to photograph various musicians and entertainers. By the late 1960s, she was a regular fixture at the Fillmore East, a New York concert venue, where she became the unofficial house photographer capturing numerous performances at the legendary club, and was the first woman to have a photograph on the cover of the influential music magazine Rolling Stone. Her photographs were displayed in galleries and museums such as the Victoria and Albert Museum, and were collected in several books.

Linda had been learning to play keyboards from her husband, and after the 1970 breakup of the Beatles, Paul and Linda recorded the album Ram together. They formed the band Wings in 1971. She continued to play alongside Paul following Wings' breakup in 1981 until The New World Tour in 1993.

She was an animal rights activist. Linda's Kitchen: Simple and Inspiring Recipes for Meatless Meals, the second of her two vegetarian cookbooks, was nominated for a James Beard Award in 1996. She also founded the vegetarian Linda McCartney Foods company with her husband.

== Early years ==
Linda McCartney was born Linda Louise Eastman in Scarsdale, New York, on September 24, 1941. She had one older brother named John, and two younger sisters named Laura and Louise Jr. Her mother, Louise Sara Eastman (née Lindner), was from a German-Jewish family. Her maternal grandfather was Max J. Lindner, founder of the Lindner Company clothing store in Cleveland, Ohio. Her father, Lee Eastman (born Leopold Vail Epstein), was the son of Belarusian-Jewish immigrants Louis and Stella (Shkolnick) Epstein from Gomel. His sister Rose Frisch became a recognized scientist who worked on women's fertility and population studies. Her father practiced entertainment law in New York and counted among his famous clients Harold Arlen, Tommy Dorsey, Willem de Kooning, Jack Lawrence, and Mark Rothko. At Eastman's request, Lawrence wrote the song "Linda" when she was one year old. It was recorded by Buddy Clark in 1947 and went to No. 2 on the Billboard Best Sellers chart, and was recorded again in 1963 by duo Jan and Dean.

Eastman graduated from Scarsdale High School in 1959. She then attended Vermont College in Montpelier, Vermont, where she received an Associate of Arts in 1961. Her brother John, who studied law like their father, later became the attorney and manager of her husband Paul McCartney. She preferred nature and animals while growing up and enjoyed horseriding as a child. After graduating from Vermont College, she attended the University of Arizona and majored in fine arts while taking up nature photography as a hobby. While she was studying there, her mother was killed in the 1962 crash of American Airlines Flight 1 in Jamaica Bay, New York. She then left the University of Arizona without graduating, and married Joseph Melville See Jr. (in June 1962). Their daughter Heather was born in December 1962. They divorced in 1965, and Linda resumed using her maiden name.

== Career ==
=== Photography ===
Linda became a receptionist and editorial assistant for Town & Country magazine. In 1965, she became romantically involved with photographer David Dalton. She studied how he worked during photo shoots, how he set up shots and managed lighting and composition. When she began her own shoots, such as with music groups, he said he was "astonished" at how easily she could take control of unruly or uncooperative musicians. He said that shooting rock groups was "a bloody pain in the neck. But with the lovely Linda, all this changed ... Now their eyes were pinned on her."

Dalton was also impressed by the intelligence of Eastman's daughter. "Linda and I would get high and Heather would say the most amazing things ... I'd think, 'This is André Breton at six years old!'" He added that he found Linda's relationship with Heather a "very charming aspect of her life with this wonderful child."

When the magazine received an invitation to photograph the Rolling Stones during a record promotion party on a yacht, Eastman immediately volunteered to represent the publication. The photo shoot marked a turning point in her life:

I was the only photographer they allowed on the yacht. I just kept clicking away with the camera, and they enjoyed it and I enjoyed it, and suddenly I found that taking pictures was a great way to live and a great way to work.

Eastman's father wanted her to undertake formal training with a professional photographer. "Well, I never had the patience for that," she said. "I had to trust my feelings." But she had studied the photography of horses at college in Arizona under Hazel Larsen Archer and became an avid nature hobbyist, using a Leica camera. A few months after her Rolling Stones shoot, she was allowed backstage at Shea Stadium, where the Beatles performed.

Eastman had gained some experience in celebrity photography and became an unofficial house photographer at Bill Graham's Fillmore East concert hall. Among the artists she photographed there were Todd Rundgren, Aretha Franklin, Grace Slick, Jimi Hendrix, Bob Dylan, Janis Joplin, Eric Clapton, Simon & Garfunkel, the Who, the Doors, the Animals, John Lennon, and Neil Young. Her photo of Young, taken in 1967, was used on the cover of Sugar Mountain – Live at Canterbury House 1968 in 2008.

She photographed Clapton for Rolling Stone magazine and became the first woman to have a photograph on the cover (May 11, 1968). After she married McCartney, her photo of the two of them appeared on the cover of Rolling Stone on January 31, 1974, making her the only person to appear on the magazine's cover who was also the photographer. Her photographs were later exhibited in more than 50 galleries internationally, and at the Victoria and Albert Museum in London. A collection of photographs from that time, Linda McCartney's Sixties: Portrait of an Era, was published in 1992. She also took the photograph for the cover of Paul McCartney and Michael Jackson's single "The Girl Is Mine."

=== Music ===
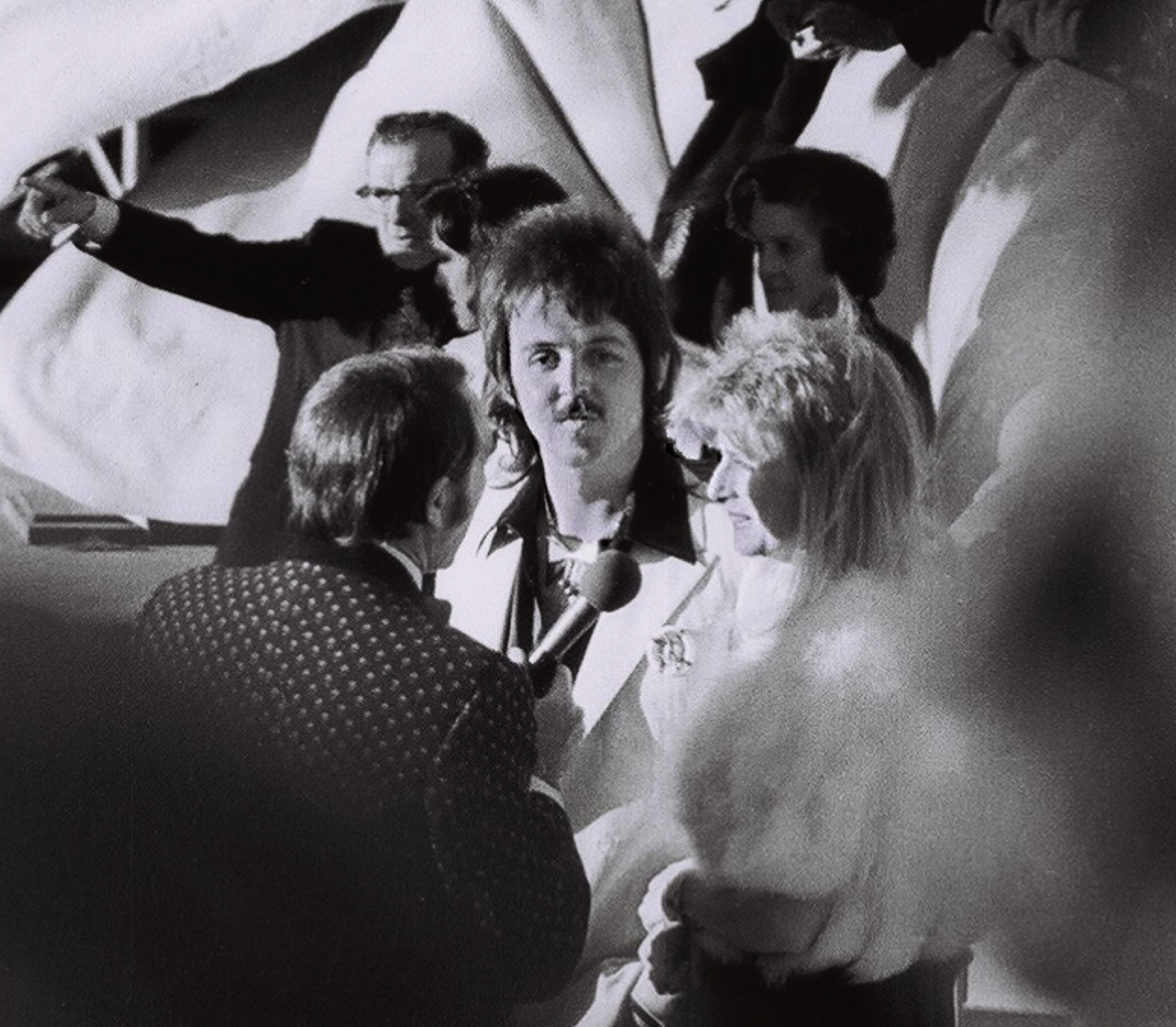
Paul and Linda McCartney at the Academy Awards at the Dorothy Chandler Pavilion April 2, 1974

After the Beatles broke up in 1970, Paul taught Linda to play keyboards and recorded an album with her, Ram, as a duo. The couple formed the band Wings. They garnered several Grammy Awards, becoming one of the most successful British bands of the 1970s, but had to endure gibes about Linda's singing.

In 1977 the reggae-inspired single "Seaside Woman" was released by an obscure band called Suzy and the Red Stripes on Epic Records in the United States. Suzy and the Red Stripes were Wings, with Linda (who wrote the song) on lead vocals. The song, recorded by Wings in 1972, was written in response to allegations from Paul's publisher that Linda's co-writing credits were inauthentic and that she was not a real songwriter. In 1971 Northern Songs and Maclen Music filed a lawsuit alleging that Paul McCartney had violated an exclusive rights agreement by collaborating with Linda on the song "Another Day," which had the effect of transferring a 50% share of the publishing royalties to his own McCartney Music company. The lawsuit was "amicably settled," according to an ATV spokesman, in June 1972.

The McCartneys shared an Oscar nomination for the song "Live and Let Die"; they were photographed together at the event in April 1974. Linda's album Wide Prairie, which included "Seaside Woman," was released posthumously in 1998. Along with eight other British composers, Paul contributed to the choral album A Garland for Linda, and he dedicated his classical album Ecce Cor Meum (1999) to Linda.

=== Vegetarian cookbooks and company ===
Linda and Paul decided to become vegetarians in 1975. This shift led to the creation of cookbooks and a company. In 1989, she released her first vegetarian cookbook, Linda McCartney's Home Cooking (she credits author Peter Cox "for all of his help and research" on the copyright page). Next in 1991, Linda started her own company called Linda McCartney Foods, that served frozen vegetarian meals. In 1999, the H. J. Heinz Company acquired the company, and in 2007, the Hain Celestial Group bought it.

Her second vegetarian cookbook, Linda's Kitchen: Simple and Inspiring Recipes for Meatless Meals, was published in 1995, and was nominated for a James Beard Foundation Award in the Vegetarian Books category in 1996. A few decades later, Paul, Stella, and Mary McCartney updated her previous cookbooks and released them as the 2021 cookbook, Linda McCartney's Family Kitchen: Over 90 Plant-Based Recipes to Save the Planet and Nourish the Soul, which was nominated for an IVFF award in 2021.

== Personal life ==
=== Marriages ===
==== Joseph See Jr. (1962–1965) ====
Eastman's first marriage was to Joseph Melville See Jr., whom she met in college. He gained a geology degree from Princeton and pursued graduate studies at the University of Arizona in Tucson. Eastman followed him there, where she enrolled at the university to study art history. While she was there her mother was killed in the March 1, 1962 crash of American Airlines Flight 1 over Jamaica Bay, New York.

She married See on June 18, 1962, and their daughter Heather Louise was born on December 31, 1962. The couple had dissimilar lifestyles, became increasingly unhappy, and divorced in June 1965. He was an academic who spent much of his time studying and doing research, while she preferred a home life. She loved the wide open spaces in Arizona and enjoyed riding horses through the desert landscape. The settings, with saguaro cacti, reminded her of scenery from western films, which inspired her to take up photography as a hobby.

==== Paul McCartney (1969–1998) ====
On May 15, 1967, while on a photo assignment in London, Eastman met Paul McCartney at the Bag O'Nails club, where Georgie Fame was performing. They met again four days later at the launch party for Sgt. Pepper's Lonely Hearts Club Band at Brian Epstein's house. When her assignment was completed, she flew back to New York City.

They got together again the following May in New York, while McCartney and John Lennon were there to inaugurate Apple Records. A few months after he returned to London, McCartney invited Eastman to spend some time with him there. When she arrived, they went to his home, where they spent the evening. "He must have been really happy that night," said one of the fans who often loitered outside his home. "He sat on the windowsill with his acoustic guitar and sang 'Blackbird' to us from his upstairs room".

McCartney was attracted to Eastman for a number of reasons, which he explained later: "I liked her as a woman; she was good-looking with a good figure, so physically I was attracted to her". McCartney also liked her sense of independence:

"Her mental attitude was quite rebellious ... [growing up] she was the kind of kid who would hang out in the kitchen with the black maids" to learn cooking. She disliked socializing. They both liked natural surroundings, he said, and they shared a love of nature, which became one of their most important emotional links. He knew that because of her "very free spirit", she was considered a rebel and a black sheep by her family for avoiding excelling in education, unlike her father and brother. "She was an artist", Paul said, "and was not cut out to be an academic".

Linda's daughter, Heather, created another strong bond between them, since he had always liked and wanted children of his own. When McCartney first met Heather, who was nearly six, he insisted that she and Linda move to London to live with him. After they did, he devoted time to Heather, playing with her, reading her stories, and drawing cartoons with her. He sang her to sleep at bedtime.

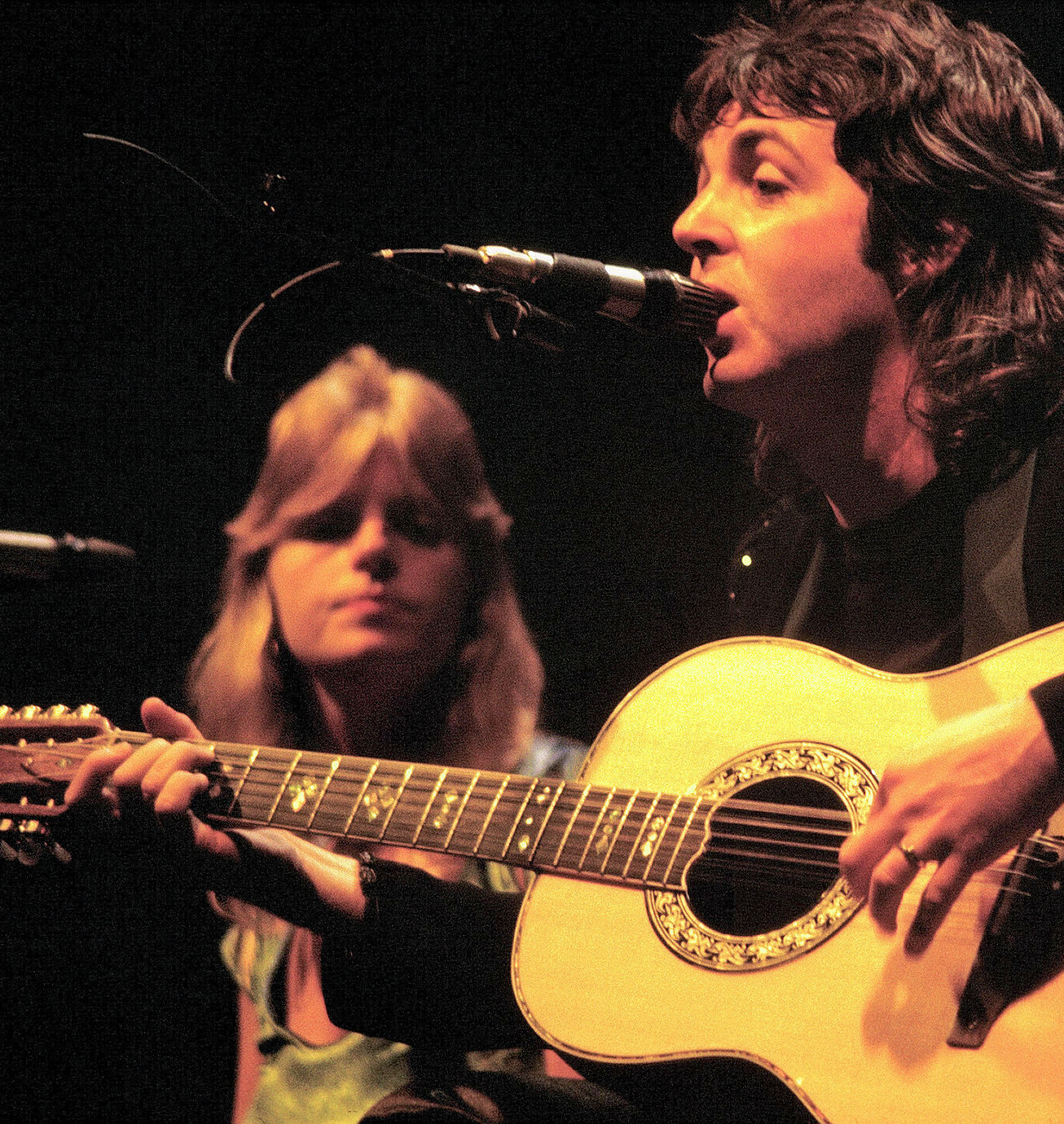
Linda McCartney performing in 1976 with Paul McCartney and Wings

Biographer Philip Norman observed that Linda had some personality aspects which Paul admired. She seemed less concerned with clothing or her public appearance, preferring to dress casually, even in semi-formal settings. She typically held his arm when they were together, often "gazing up at him in awe", and seeming to idolize him. Paul's friends said that he began to be less formal, whether shaving less often or just wearing simpler clothes. "He could go on the bus down to Apple", said his maid, "and no one would recognize him."

Linda's relaxed attitude about everyday things began to affect him in other ways. He recalls once feeling guilty because he was exhausted from work and, having trained himself to never appear tired, apologized to her. She simply replied, "it's allowed", which amazed him. "I remember thinking, Fucking hell! That was a mind-blower. I'd never been with anyone who thought like that ... it was patently clear that it was allowed to be tired".

They were married in a small civil ceremony at Marylebone Town Hall on March 12, 1969. British fans reacted negatively, partly because his marriage ended McCartney's status as the last unattached Beatle. John Lennon married Yoko Ono a week later, and both women were perceived by fans as reasons for the group's breakup. Lennon at one point publicly criticized the way the press treated Linda: "She got the same kind of insults, hatred, absolute garbage thrown at her for no reason whatsoever other than she fell in love with Paul McCartney".

In late 1969, Paul fell into a deep depression due to the Beatles' pending breakup after John Lennon's departure. He spent days in bed and drank excessively, wondering what to do with his life. McCartney later said that Linda helped him pull out of that crisis by praising his work as a songwriter and persuading him to continue writing and recording.

After a few troubled months, Paul McCartney wrote "Maybe I'm Amazed" in Linda's honour. He explained during an interview that the song was written "for me and Linda", and that with the Beatles breaking up,

"that was my feeling: Maybe I'm amazed at what's going on ... Maybe I'm a man and maybe you're the only woman who could ever help me; Baby won't you help me understand ... Maybe I'm amazed at the way you pulled me out of time, hung me on the line, Maybe I'm amazed at the way I really need you". He added that "every love song I write is for Linda".

His marriage to Linda, viewed as such a disastrous misstep at the time, became by far the happiest and most durable in pop. Despite the immensity of his fame and wealth, the couple managed to lead a relatively normal domestic life and prevent their children from becoming the usual pampered, neglected, screwed-up rock-biz brats. If the public never quite warmed to Linda, thanks mainly to her militant vegetarianism and animal-rights activism, she was acknowledged to have been the right one for him, just as Yoko had been for John.

— Biographer Philip Norman

During their 29-year marriage, the McCartneys had four children: she brought her daughter Heather (whom Paul later formally adopted) from her first marriage, and together the couple had Mary (b. August 28, 1969), Stella (b. September 13, 1971), and James (b. September 12, 1977).

They sometimes went to his farmhouse retreat in the west of Scotland which he had originally purchased to "escape Beatlemania." They both liked and needed time away from the city, and were equally attracted to natural surroundings, writes biographer Barry Miles. "We'd just enjoy sitting out in nature", Paul said. The song "Two of Us" on Let it Be was written by Paul during one of their country drives. "This song was about that: doing nothing, trying to get lost ... [and] the wonderfully free attitude we were able to have."

Linda recalled the setting:

Scotland was like nothing I'd ever lived in. It was the most beautiful land you have ever seen, way at the end of nowhere. To me it was the first feeling I'd ever had of civilization dropped away ... so different from all the hotels and limousines and the music business, so it was quite a relief.

McCartney began writing more of his songs away from the studio. "I found that I was enjoying working alone", he said. He wrote the song "The Lovely Linda" for his debut solo album while they were staying in Scotland. In 1971, they recorded the album Ram.

She became Lady McCartney when her husband was knighted in 1997. Her brother, entertainment lawyer John Eastman, had represented McCartney since the Beatles' breakup, until his death in 2022.

=== Lifestyle ===
==== Animal rights activist ====
A strong advocate of animal rights, Linda lent her support to many organizations, such as People for the Ethical Treatment of Animals (PETA), the Council for the Protection of Rural England, and Friends of the Earth. She was also a patron of the League Against Cruel Sports. She narrated a TV advertisement for PETA in which she said: "Have you ever seen a fish gasping for breath when you take it out of the water? They're saying, 'Thanks a lot for killing me. It feels great, you know.' No! It hurts!" After her death, PETA created the Linda McCartney Memorial Award.

==== Marijuana ====
In 1984, McCartney was arrested in Barbados for possession of marijuana; her husband had been arrested in 1975 in Los Angeles on the same charge. After flying to Heathrow Airport, she was arrested on charges of possession. She later said that, while hard drugs were "disgusting," marijuana was "pretty lightweight."

== Diagnosis and death ==
McCartney in 1992

McCartney was diagnosed with breast cancer in 1995, and her condition worsened when the cancer metastasized to her liver. Paul was aware of the prognosis and later said, "The doctors had told me privately that we'd caught it too late, that she'll have about 18 months. And that was what she had." She died from the disease at the age of 56 on April 17, 1998, at the McCartney family ranch in Tanque Verde, near Tucson, Arizona. Her family was with her when she died.

McCartney was cremated in Tucson, and her ashes were scattered at the McCartney family's farm in Sussex. Paul later suggested that fans remember her by donating to breast cancer research charities that did not support animal testing, "or the best tribute: go veggie." A memorial service was held at St. Martin-in-the-Fields in London, which was attended by George Harrison, Ringo Starr, Billy Joel, Elton John, David Gilmour, Peter Gabriel, and other celebrities among a congregation of 700. A memorial service was also held at Riverside Church in Manhattan two months after her death. Paul said at her funeral, "She was my girlfriend. I lost my girlfriend."

McCartney left all of her property to Paul, including royalties from books and records and rights to her photos. He pledged to continue her line of vegetarian food and to keep it free from GMOs.

=== Tributes and dedications ===
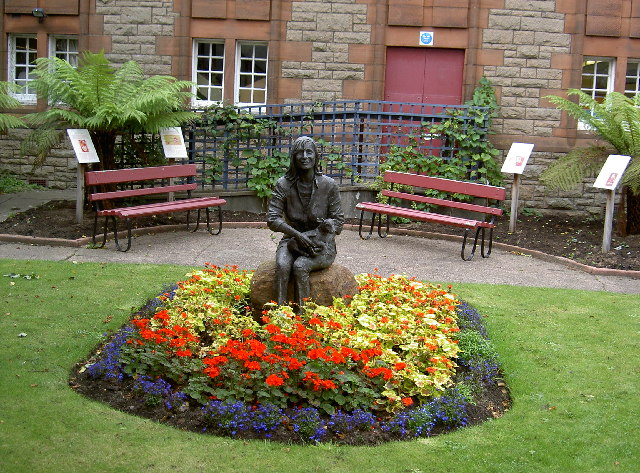
The Linda McCartney Memorial Garden and bronze statue in Campbeltown, Scotland

In June 1998, the artist Brian Clarke exhibited The Glass Wall (Dedicated to Linda McCartney), a 1,012-square-foot (94.0 m^{2}) artwork in stained glass, at the Tony Shafrazi Gallery in New York. Created by Clarke between 1997–98, a period in which he and McCartney exhibited their collaborations in photography and stained glass together at the Swiss National Museum of Glass Arts in Romont, the artwork—which takes as its motif the fleur-de-lys or lily, cited as Linda's favourite flower—was renamed in tribute to her after her death. The exhibition, of the same name, ran until September 1998, after which The Glass Wall was acquired by the Corning Museum of Glass, and installed as part of its permanent collection in Corning, Steuben County, New York. After her death, the Edinburgh International Film Festival premiered Wide Prairie, a six-minute cartoon fantasy film McCartney made with director Oscar Grillo.

In April 1999, Paul McCartney performed at the "Concert for Linda" tribute at the Royal Albert Hall, organized by two of their friends, Chrissie Hynde and Carla Lane. Among the artists who performed, besides Paul, were George Michael, the Pretenders, Elvis Costello, Tom Jones, and Neil Finn. Paul closed the concert by dedicating the event to Linda, whom he called his "beautiful baby," and their children.

On 19 July 1999, Paul opened the Linda McCartney Children's Play Area in Calderstones Park in Liverpool, unveiling a plaque at the entrance and planting a cypress oak tree nearby overlooking the play area.

In January 2000, Paul made donations in excess of $2,000,000 for cancer research at the Memorial Sloan-Kettering Cancer Center in New York and the University of Arizona Cancer Center in Tucson, where Linda received treatment. The donations, through the Garland Appeal, were made on the condition that no animals would be used for testing. Also in 2000, the Linda McCartney Centre, a cancer clinic, opened at The Royal Liverpool University Hospital. In November 2002, the Linda McCartney Kintyre Memorial Trust opened a memorial garden in Campbeltown Library and Museum near where the family's Scottish farmhouse was located, with a bronze statue of her created by sculptor Jane Robbins, Paul's cousin.

== Representation in media ==
Elizabeth Mitchell and Gary Bakewell played the McCartneys in the 2000 TV film The Linda McCartney Story. She was portrayed by Catherine Strauss in the 1985 TV film John and Yoko: A Love Story. The McCartneys guest-starred as themselves in The Simpsons 1995 episode "Lisa the Vegetarian."

She appears in the 2021 Peter Jackson documentary The Beatles: Get Back.

On October 31, 2025 it was announced that Saoirse Ronan will be portraying McCartney in The Beatles – A Four-Film Cinematic Event directed by Sam Mendes, due to be released in April 2028.

== Discography ==
=== Albums ===
- Ram (1971) (with Paul McCartney)
- Wide Prairie (1998)

=== Solo singles ===
Year	Title	UK	Album
1998	"Wide Prairie"	74	Wide Prairie
1999	"The Light Comes from Within"	56	Wide Prairie

=== Session work ===
- Paul McCartney – McCartney (1970)
- Denny Laine – Holly Days (1977)
- Denny Laine – Japanese Tears (1980)
- Paul McCartney – McCartney II (1980)
- Paul McCartney – Tug of War (1982)
- Paul McCartney – Pipes of Peace (1983)
- Paul McCartney – Give My Regards to Broad Street (1984)
- Paul McCartney – Press to Play (1986)
- Paul McCartney – Flowers in the Dirt (1989)
- Paul McCartney – Off the Ground (1993)
- Paul McCartney – Flaming Pie (1997)

== See also ==
- List of animal rights advocates
- List of vegetarians

== Bibliography ==
- McCartney, Linda. Linda McCartney's Home Cooking: Quick, Easy, And Economical Vegetarian Dishes for Today. (Arcade, 1990) ISBN 978-1559700979
- McCartney, Linda. Linda's Kitchen: Simple And Inspiring Recipes For Meatless Meals. (Arcade, 1995) ISBN 978-0821221235
- McCartney, Linda (with Paul, Mary, and Stella McCartney). Linda McCartney's Family Kitchen: Over 90 Plant-Based Recipes to Save the Planet and Nourish the Soul. (Voracious/Little, Brown, and Co., 2021) ISBN 978-0-316-49798-5
