= Mary McCartney =

English photographer and cookbook author (born 1969)

- Born: Mary Anna McCartney; 28 August 1969 (age 57); London, England
- Occupations: Photographer, documentary filmmaker, cookbook author, activist
- Spouses: Alistair Donald (m. 1998; div. 2007); Simon Aboud (m. 2010)
- Children: 4
- Parents: Paul McCartney (father); Linda McCartney (mother)
- Relatives: James McCartney (brother); Stella McCartney (sister); Heather McCartney (maternal half-sister); Beatrice McCartney (paternal half-sister); Mike McCartney (paternal uncle); Lee Eastman (maternal grandfather); Rose Frisch (maternal great-aunt)

Mary Anna McCartney (born 28 August 1969) is an English photographer, documentary filmmaker, plant-based and vegetarian cookbook author, and activist. She is the Global Ambassador for Meat-Free Monday.

== Early life ==
Mary Anna McCartney was born at Avenue Clinic in the St John's Wood area of London on 28 August 1969, the daughter of American photographer Linda McCartney (1941–1998) and English musician Paul McCartney (born 1942). She is the younger maternal half-sister of Heather McCartney (born 1962), the older sister of Stella McCartney (born 1971) and James McCartney (born 1977), and the older paternal half-sister of Beatrice McCartney (born 2003).

All of the children in her family were raised as vegetarians (both of her parents were notable vegetarian activists), and in 2009, McCartney (along with Paul and Stella) launched Meat-free Mondays in the United Kingdom.

== Career ==
=== Photography and film ===
In 2015, McCartney was chosen to photograph Queen Elizabeth II as part of a campaign to celebrate the "longest-reigning British monarch in more than 1,000 years".

It was announced in January 2021 that McCartney would direct a documentary about Abbey Road Studios. She said, "Some of my earliest memories as a young child come from time spent at Abbey Road [...] I've long wanted to tell the story of this historic place." As well as her father Paul McCartney, the documentary would feature interviews with Jimmy Page, Kate Bush, Noel Gallagher, Liam Gallagher, Pink Floyd, John Williams, Celeste, Elton John, Giles Martin, and Shirley Bassey. McCartney said, "What I wanted from the interviews was to drill down into how those musicians really feel about Abbey Road. 'Do you really care about Abbey Road? It's a building and you recorded here, but whatever. Do you really care?' And I think from the interviews, you can really see they are thinking fondly about it." The documentary, If These Walls Could Sing, was created as the centrepiece of Abbey Road Studios' 90th anniversary celebrations in November 2022.

=== Cooking ===
==== Cookbooks ====
McCartney has written two vegetarian cookbooks, Food: Vegetarian Home Cooking (2012) and At My Table: Vegetarian Feasts for Family and Friends (2015). In 2023, she published the plant-based cookbook Feeding Creativity: A Cookbook for Friends and Family that features 60 recipes created for celebrities.

In 2021, Mary, Paul, and Stella turned 90 of Linda's vegetarian recipes into the plant-based cookbook Linda McCartney's Family Kitchen: Over 90 Plant-Based Recipes to Save the Planet and Nourish the Soul. Linda McCartney's Family Kitchen was nominated for an IVFF award in 2021.

==== Cooking show ====
McCartney launched Season 1 of the Discovery+/Food Network plant-based cooking show, Mary McCartney Serves It Up, in February 2021, Season 2 in November 2021, and Season three in November 2022. The show was nominated for a Daytime Emmy Award in 2022.

== Personal life ==
McCartney married Alistair Donald on 26 September 1998, and they had two sons together before divorcing in 2007. She married Simon Aboud in 2010. They have two sons together.

== Nominations and awards ==
=== Daytime Emmy Awards ===
Year	Category	Recipient/Nominated work	Role(s)	Result	Ref
2022 (49th)	Daytime Emmy Award for Outstanding Culinary Program	Mary McCartney Serves It Up	Host	Nominated	

== Publications ==
=== Cookbooks ===
- Feeding Creativity: A Cookbook for Friends and Family. Taschen America, 2023. ISBN 978-3836589420.
- McCartney, Linda (with Paul, Mary, and Stella McCartney). Linda McCartney's Family Kitchen: Over 90 Plant-Based Recipes to Save the Planet and Nourish the Soul.. Voracious/Little, Brown, 2021. ISBN 978-0-316-49798-5.
- At My Table: Vegetarian Feasts for Family and Friends. Chatto & Windus, 2014. ISBN 978-0-70118-937-2.
- Food: Vegetarian Home Cooking. Chatto & Windus, 2012. ISBN 978-0-70118-625-8.
- The Meat Free Monday Cookbook: A Full Menu for Every Monday of the Year. Kyle, 2011. ISBN 978-0-85783-067-8. Foreword by Paul, Stella, and Mary McCartney.

=== Photography ===
- Mary McCartney: From Where I Stand. Thames & Hudson, 2010. ISBN 978-0-50054-392-4.
- Mary McCartney: Monochrome & Colour. GOST, 2014. ISBN 978-1-91040-101-9.
- Mary McCartney: Twelfth Night 15.12.13. HENI, 2016. ISBN 978-0-9933161-1-1.
- Mary McCartney: The White Horse. Rizzoli, 2018. ISBN 978-0-8478-5849-1.
- Mary McCartney: Paris Nude. HENI, 2019. ISBN 978-1-912122-23-3.

== Photography exhibitions ==
- Off Pointe: A Photographic Study of the Royal Ballet After Hours, The Royal Opera House, London (2004) and presented by The Royal Photographic Society at Photo London (2019)
- British Style Observed, National History Museum, London (2008)
- From Where I Stand, National Portrait Gallery and Michael Hoppen Gallery, London (2010)
- Linda McCartney and Mary McCartney: Mother, Daughter, Gagosian Gallery, New York (2015); and at Fotografiska, Stockholm (2018)
- Undone. (2017, Toronto)

== Films ==
- If These Walls Could Sing (2022) – director
