= Break-up of the Beatles =

Account of the factors leading to the Beatles' dissolution

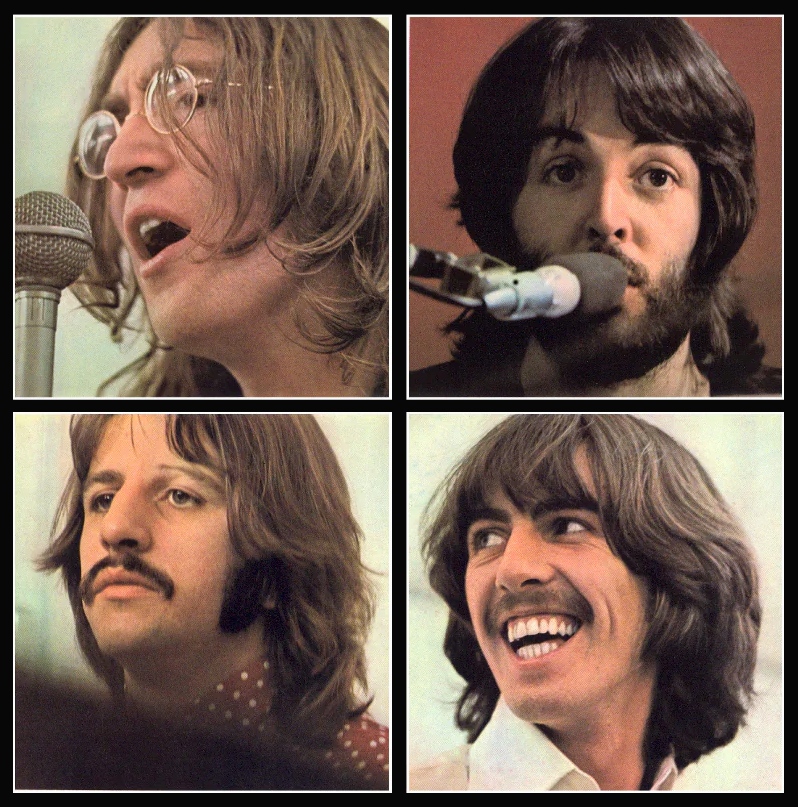
Four separated portraits of the individual Beatles used on the cover of Let It Be, their last studio album

The Beatles were an English rock band, active from 1960 to 1970. From 1962 onwards, the band's members were John Lennon, Paul McCartney, George Harrison and Ringo Starr. Their disbandment is attributed to numerous factors, including the strain of the Beatlemania phenomenon, the 1967 death of their manager Brian Epstein, bandmates' discontent with McCartney's leadership of the band, Lennon's heroin use and his relationship with Yoko Ono, Harrison's increasingly prolific songwriting, the floundering of Apple Corps, the Get Back project (renamed Let It Be in 1970), and managerial disputes.

During the latter half of the 1960s, each of the band's members began to assert individual artistic agendas. Their disunity became most evident on 1968's The Beatles (also known as "the White Album"), and quarrels and disharmony over musical matters soon permeated their business discussions. Starr left the group for two weeks during the White Album sessions, and Harrison quit for five days during the Get Back rehearsals. Starting in the autumn of 1968, the group quarrelled regarding who should handle their business affairs. McCartney lobbied for the entertainment lawyers Lee and John Eastman but was outvoted by his bandmates in favour of the businessman Allen Klein.

The final time that the four members recorded together was the session for Abbey Road's "The End" on 20 August 1969, a date which also saw further mixing and editing for "I Want You (She's So Heavy)"; their final meeting with all four present was two days later at a photo session held at Lennon's Tittenhurst estate. On 20 September, Lennon privately informed his bandmates at a meeting at Apple, without Harrison present, that he was leaving the Beatles, although it was unclear to the other members whether his departure was permanent. On 10 April 1970, McCartney said in a press release that he was no longer working with the group, which sparked a widespread media reaction and worsened the tensions between him and his bandmates. Legal disputes continued long after his announcement, and the dissolution was not formalised until 1974.

Rumours of a reunion persisted throughout the 1970s, as the members occasionally reunited for collaboration, but never with all four simultaneously. Starr's "I'm the Greatest" (1973) and Harrison's "All Those Years Ago" (1981) are the only tracks that feature three ex-Beatles. After Lennon's murder in 1980, the surviving members reunited for the Anthology project in 1994, using the unfinished Lennon demos "Free as a Bird", "Real Love" and "Now and Then" as the basis for new songs recorded and released as Beatles material, though the latter remained unreleased until 2023.

== Background ==
In an interview with Dan Rather which aired on AXS TV on 10 May 2024, Ringo Starr stated that "we didn't get along, we were four guys, we had rows," noting that their relationship was getting more tense even by the time he had children. Nevertheless, according to Starr, the band could still last as long as it did due to their music ambitions.

Epstein's management style was to let the group pursue their musical notions and projects, while often mediating when there was a conflict. This role began to diminish after the band stopped touring in 1966, although Epstein still exercised a strong influence over the band's interpersonal relations and finances. In mid-1967, a tax shelter endeavour was initiated under Epstein's oversight, comprising a revised legal partnership (of the four Beatles) and an associated corporation named Apple Corps (to which most Beatles revenue would be paid). However, on 27 August, Epstein died of a drug overdose; the consequences of his absence, combined with the Beatles' inexperience as businessmen, led to an unexpectedly chaotic venture that added stress for the band during the coming months.

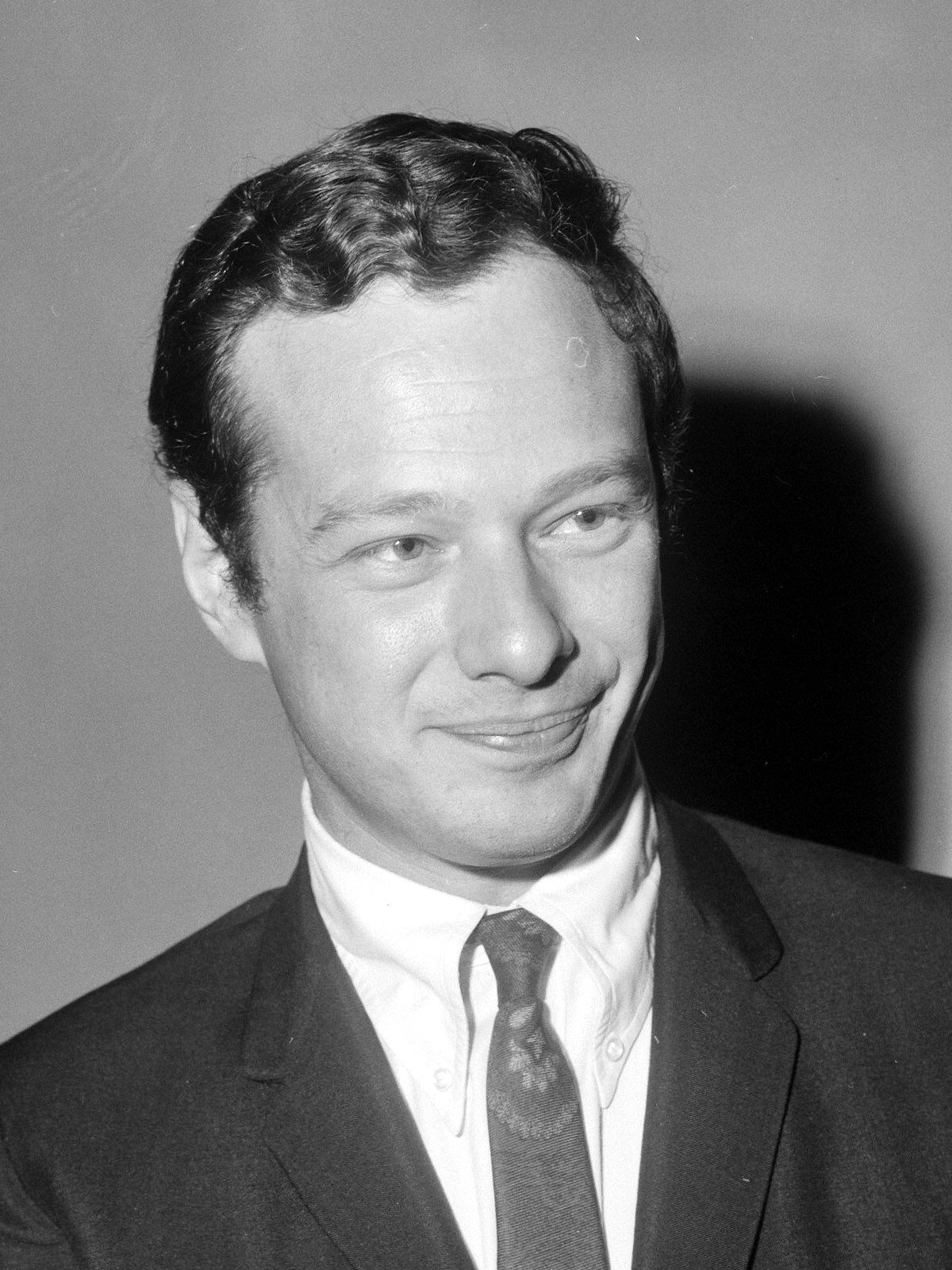
Brian Epstein, the Beatles' manager from 1961 until his death in 1967

Epstein's death left the Beatles disoriented and fearful about the future. McCartney sought to initiate projects for the group, although his bandmates grew perturbed by his growing domination in musical as well as other group ventures. Lennon later reflected that McCartney's efforts were important for the survival of the band, but he still believed that McCartney's desire to help came from his own misgivings about pursuing a solo career. McCartney felt that the four members' evolution from musicians to businessmen was central to the band's disintegration. Epstein's role as band manager was never replaced, and ultimately the lack of strong managerial leadership contributed significantly to the break-up.

When the group convened to record The Beatles in May 1968, there was still a camaraderie and desire to collaborate as musicians; however, their individual differences were becoming more apparent. To a greater extent than the others, McCartney maintained a deep interest in the pop musical trends and styles emerging both in the United Kingdom and the United States, whereas Harrison developed an interest in Indian music and religion, and John Lennon's compositions became more introspective and experimental. In Beatles historian Mark Lewisohn's opinion, Sgt. Pepper represented the group's last unified effort, displaying a cohesion that deteriorated immediately after the album's April 1967 completion and entirely disappeared by 1968.

Another factor in the split was Harrison's growth as a composer during the second half of their career. Many of his song ideas were rejected by Lennon and McCartney, especially from 1968 onwards. (Note: In the early years, Lennon and McCartney were the band's primary songwriters and vocalists, with Harrison and Starr taking supporting roles. Lennon and McCartney would often compose one song per album for Starr to sing, while Harrison would either cover an old standard or record one of his own compositions. From 1965 onwards, Harrison's compositions started to mature and become more appealing in their quality. Gradually, the other band members acknowledged Harrison's potential as a songwriter.) Although this was partly indicative of the increased competition for space on album sides, with three songwriters in the band, Harrison's frustration fostered in him a sense of alienation from the Beatles. He later reflected that at first he was content to make occasional contributions as a composer, and he only came to resent Lennon and McCartney's domination when he offered songs "that were better than some of theirs and we'd have to record maybe eight of theirs before they'd listen to mine." Harrison became the first member of the group to release a solo album, with Wonderwall Music, much of which was recorded in Bombay in January 1968.

== White Album and Get Back rehearsals ==
In May 1968, the band met at Harrison's home in Esher to record demos of songs later recorded for their November 1968 release The Beatles (also known as "the White Album"). Contemporaneous reviews and retrospective commentary by the Beatles acknowledged that the double album reflected the development of autonomous composers, musicians and artists. Rolling Stone later described it as "four solo albums under one roof." McCartney described the sessions as a turning point for the group because "there was a lot of friction during that album. We were just about to break up, and that was tense in itself," while Lennon said that "the break-up of the Beatles can be heard on that album."

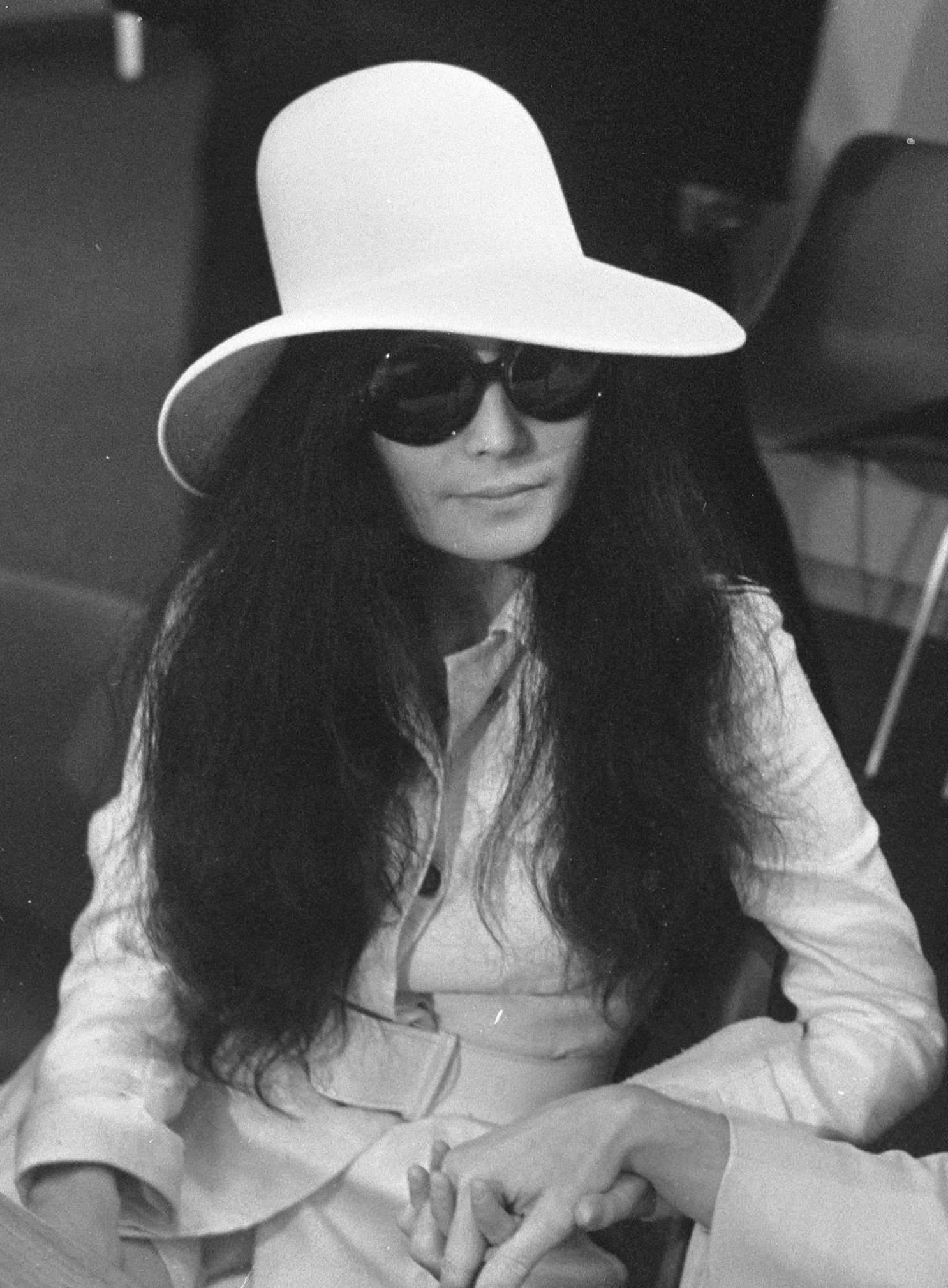
Lennon's wife Yoko Ono, March 1969

The sessions marked the first appearance in the studio of Lennon's new domestic and artistic partner, Yoko Ono, who accompanied him to EMI Studios to work on "Revolution 1" and who would thereafter be a more or less constant presence at all Beatles sessions. Ono's presence was highly unorthodox, as prior to that point, the Beatles had generally worked in isolation, rarely inviting wives and girlfriends to recording sessions. (Note: McCartney's girlfriend at the time, Francie Schwartz, was also present at some sessions, as were the other two Beatles' wives, Pattie Harrison and Maureen Starkey.) Lennon's devotion to Ono over the other Beatles made working conditions difficult by impeding the intuitive aspect that had previously been essential to the band's music. Ono's presence was regarded as intrusive and became a particular source of rancour with Harrison because, since 1965, he and Lennon had bonded over their experimentation with LSD and Indian spirituality – two experiences that McCartney had approached with a level of caution.

Lennon's and McCartney's artistic avenues became more disparate, with McCartney disapproving of Lennon and Ono's experimental sound collage "Revolution 9", and Lennon contemptuous of light-hearted McCartney songs such as "Martha My Dear" and "Honey Pie". Harrison continued to develop as a songwriter, yet he received little support from within the band during the sessions. Feeling resentment from Lennon and McCartney for his role in leading the Beatles to the Maharishi, Harrison's composition "Not Guilty" reflected his state of mind after their return from India.

Ringo Starr became increasingly dissatisfied with the standard of his drumming. According to author Mark Hertsgaard, this was "a feeling that [McCartney] in particular had done much to encourage." Distressed also by the sour and tense atmosphere that was characteristic of the recording sessions, Starr felt so isolated that he left the band for several weeks and holidayed with his family in Sardinia. He returned in early September to find his drum kit decorated with flowers, which were a gift from Harrison.

With the release of The Beatles in November, the band no longer gave collective interviews or recorded appearances, and public relations were carried out individually. Other evidence of the group's collective alienation came with the release of their 1968 Christmas fan club recording; the contributions were entirely individual and Lennon made disparaging remarks about his bandmates' apparent disdain for Ono.

By the end of 1968, the Beatles' status as a group entity was in limbo. McCartney suggested a group project involving rehearsing, recording and then performing a set of songs for a live concert. The project soon adopted a working title of Get Back. Although the sessions for their double album had involved a degree of ensemble playing, the band were ill-prepared to settle comfortably back into this mode; in particular, Lennon had descended into heroin addiction, leaving him variously incommunicative or highly critical of the venture. On 10 January 1969, eight days after filmed rehearsals commenced at Twickenham Film Studios, Harrison's frustration and resentment peaked and he informed his bandmates that he was leaving. Having enjoyed rewarding collaborations outside the Beatles during much of 1968, particularly with Eric Clapton, Bob Dylan and the Band, Harrison began to feel stifled by the combined patronising by McCartney and estrangement from Lennon. The band were at an impasse and on the verge of collapse.

Ultimately, complicated negotiations brought Harrison back into the group's activities. At his insistence, McCartney's plans for a full concert were abandoned and the project was relocated to the band's Apple Studio in Savile Row, with the focus now on merely completing a new album of some of the songs rehearsed at Twickenham. The Beatles gave their last public performance on the rooftop of Apple's headquarters on 30 January 1969, as a substitute for an audience-based concert.

== Business difficulties ==
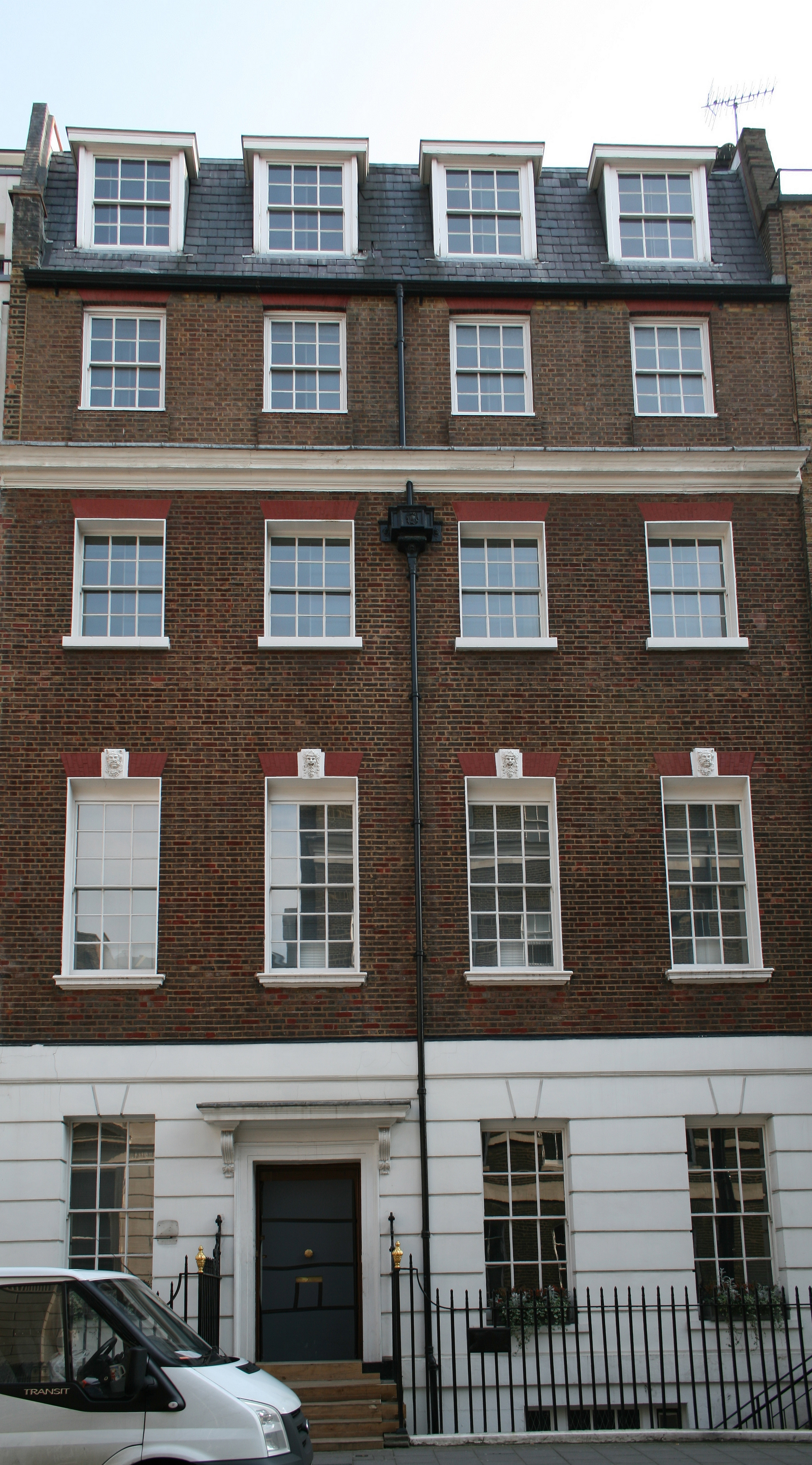
Apple Corps building at 3 Savile Row

In early 1969, Apple Corps was plagued by mismanagement and was losing money. On 26 January, Lennon and Ono met with Allen Klein, the founder of ABKCO Records, regarding managerial advice. Lennon requested that Klein represent his business interests in the band. McCartney chose to be represented by American entertainment lawyers Lee and John Eastman, the father and brother of his girlfriend Linda Eastman, whom he married on 12 March. In April, after a series of rancorous meetings between Klein, the Eastmans and the Beatles, Klein was appointed as the band's business manager on an interim basis, with the Eastmans as the Beatles' lawyers. The band members' quarrels and disharmony over musical matters soon permeated their business discussions.

Dick James, the managing director of Northern Songs (publisher of the Lennon–McCartney song catalogue) became increasingly concerned over the band's dissension and resentment towards him due to his refusal to renegotiate their royalty rate. Without informing Lennon or McCartney, James and Northern Songs' chairman Emmanuel Silver accepted a bid from the British entertainment conglomerate Associated Television (ATV) to sell their 32% stake in the company and recommended other shareholders do the same, which would give ATV a controlling interest. Lennon and McCartney, who together owned 26% of the stock, made a bid to gain a controlling interest in Northern Songs but were unsuccessful. The Eastmans and Klein soon developed an adversarial relationship given their disparate advice and counsel. Conflicting advice regarding an offer to purchase Epstein's NEMS Enterprises, which still collected 25% of the Beatles' income, resulted in a missed opportunity and the Epstein family sold their 90% stake to Triumph Investment Trust instead.

Given a choice between Klein and the Eastmans, Harrison and Starr opted for Klein. The Eastmans were dismissed as the Beatles' legal representation, and on 8 May, Lennon, Harrison and Starr signed a contract with Klein to be the band's business manager. This further aggravated the underlying mistrust and antipathy experienced within the band. Rob Sheffield, listing Klein, Yoko Ono, Linda Eastman and Phil Spector as significant arrivals in the Beatles' lives, states that "Klein is easily the least famous of the four, but arguably the one who played the biggest role in their demise."

== Abbey Road and Lennon's departure ==
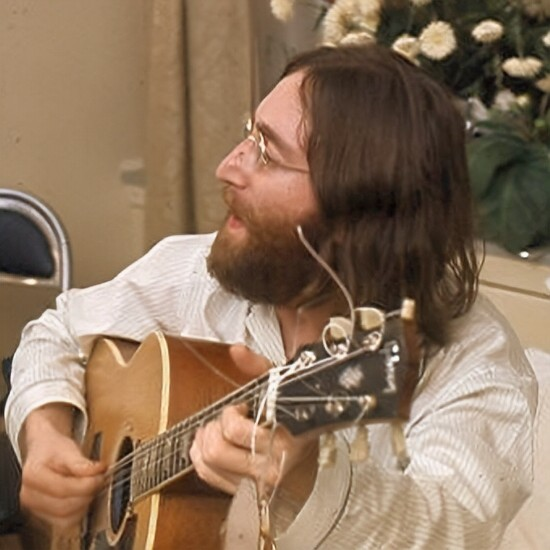
Lennon rehearsing "Give Peace a Chance", June 1969

With the troubled Get Back project put on hold, the group continued to record together sporadically during the spring and early summer of 1969. Otherwise, the band members became increasingly involved in activities outside the band; among these, Lennon launched an international peace campaign with Ono, spearheaded by their single "Give Peace a Chance"; Harrison continued to focus on producing Apple Records signings, including Jackie Lomax, Billy Preston and devotees from the London Radha Krishna Temple; and Starr began to establish himself as a film actor. Their occasional sessions together over the first half of the year ultimately paved the way for the Beatles' last studio recording project, Abbey Road. The 18 August session for "The End" marked the final occasion that all four members recorded collectively. The last time the foursome were together in the same studio was for the completion and mixing of "I Want You (She's So Heavy)" two days later.

On 8 September, Starr was admitted to London's Middlesex Hospital for intestinal issues. While he was hospitalized, Lennon, McCartney and Harrison met on 9 September to discuss recording a follow-up to Abbey Road. In the meeting Lennon and Harrison expressed frustration with having to compete with McCartney to get their songs recorded. Lennon proposed a different approach to songwriting by ending the Lennon–McCartney pretence and having four compositions apiece from Lennon, McCartney and Harrison, with two from Starr and a lead single around Christmas. (Note: In 2019, Beatles biographer Mark Lewisohn said the existence of a tape of this conversation, which had been recorded for Starr's benefit, was "revelatory" and challenged the assumption that the band had never intended to record together again.) Harrison referred to the possibility of a new Beatles album in an interview he gave in November, and he called this songwriting arrangement "an equal rights thing". McCartney later dismissed the new division of songwriting, saying it "wasn't the right balance" and was "too democratic for its own good". Speaking to Melody Maker in September, Lennon said: "The trouble is we've got too much material. Now that George is writing a lot, we could put out a double album every month ..." During the 9 September meeting, McCartney expressed that, before Abbey Road, he "thought that George's songs weren't that good", to which Lennon reacted by saying none of the other Beatles liked McCartney's "Ob-La-Di, Ob-La-Da" and "Maxwell's Silver Hammer" and that those types of songs should be given to other artists to record.

Soon after the sessions for Abbey Road, Lennon's heroin use inspired him to record "Cold Turkey" with his and Ono's conceptual group, the Plastic Ono Band, after the Beatles had rejected the song for release as a single. The formation of the Plastic Ono Band was conceived as an artistic outlet for Lennon and Ono, but the enthusiastic reception afforded their performance at the Toronto Rock and Roll Revival on 13 September 1969 ostensibly crystallised Lennon's decision to leave the Beatles, which he made on the flight back to London. During a band meeting at Apple on 20 September, he informed McCartney, Starr and Klein of his decision (Harrison was not present at the meeting), telling them he wanted a "divorce". That same day, the band signed a renegotiated recording contract with Capitol Records, guaranteeing them a higher royalty rate. The sensitivity of the negotiations with Capitol led to Klein and McCartney urging Lennon to keep his announcement private, which Lennon agreed to do.

On 25 November, Lennon's comments from a recent radio interview were reported in an NME article titled "The Beatles on the Brink of Splitting". Among his remarks, Lennon said that the running of Apple had superseded the band's music-making and he went "off and on" the idea of the group recording together again. McCartney later recalled that in the three or four months after Lennon's announcement, he, Harrison and Starr would phone each other asking, "Well, is this it, then?" McCartney said that they suspected that it might be "one of John's little flings" and that Lennon might change his mind, since he "did kind of leave the door open". In early January 1970, while visiting Denmark with Ono, Lennon told a journalist that "we're not breaking up the band, but we're breaking its image" and added that none of the Beatles were millionaires, which is why before long they would record a new album.

== Announcement ==
=== Release of McCartney and Let It Be ===
Having long attempted to maintain cohesiveness within the Beatles, McCartney secluded himself with his new family at his Scottish farm, distraught at Lennon's departure. After being tracked down by reporters from Life magazine in late October 1969 to quell rumours that he had died, McCartney said that "the Beatle thing is over", although the full meaning of this remark was still unclear. Effectively estranged from his bandmates and deeply depressed, McCartney had begun making a series of home recordings in London during December. Operating under strict secrecy, he privately agreed on a release date for this proposed solo album, titled McCartney, with Apple Records executive Neil Aspinall.

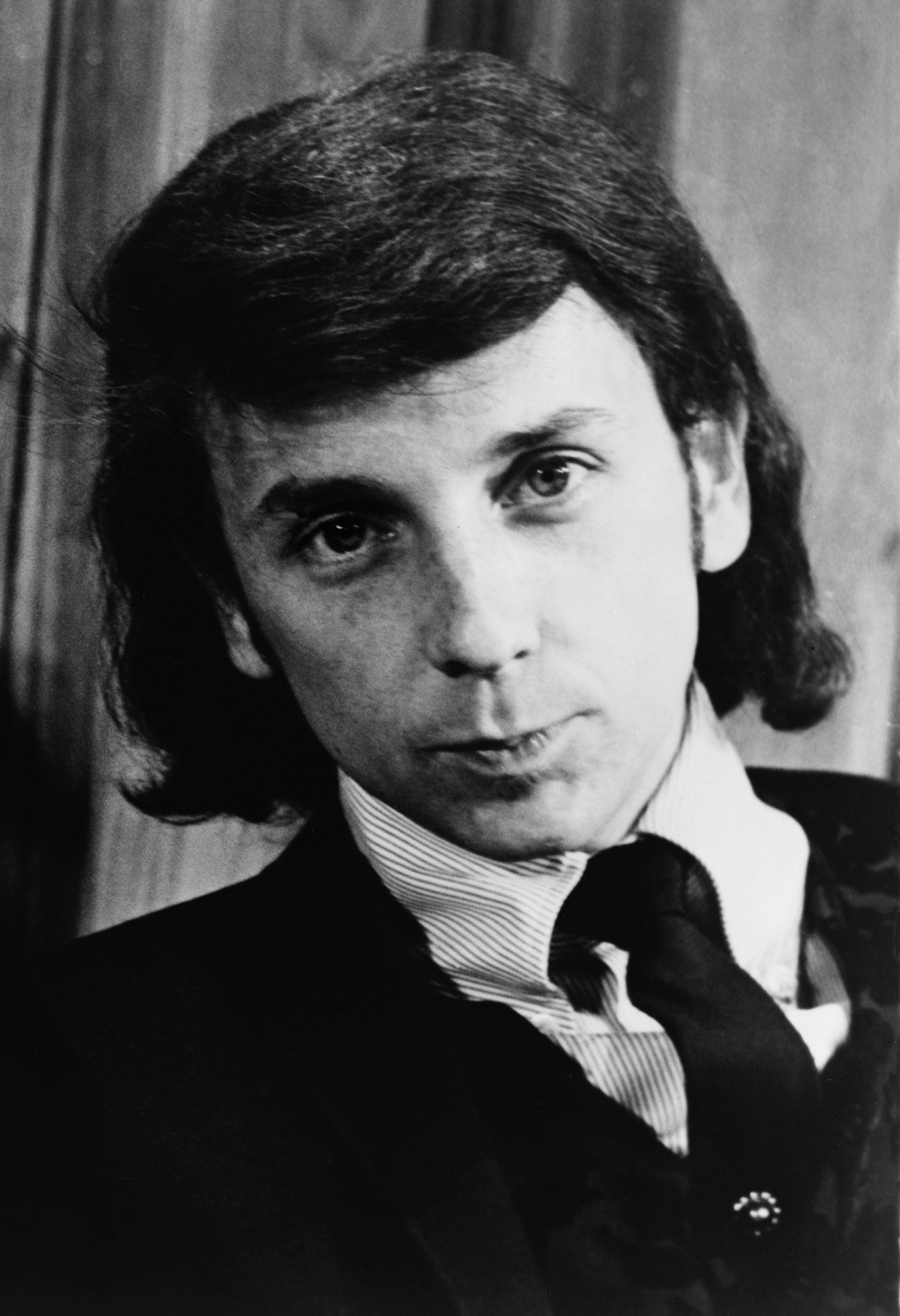
Let It Be producer Phil Spector (1965)

On 3 and 4 January 1970, less than four months after Lennon's departure and the release of Abbey Road, McCartney, Harrison and Starr reconvened at EMI Studios to record Harrison's "I Me Mine" and complete work on McCartney's song "Let It Be". (Note: Lennon did not participate as he was in Denmark at the time.) Both tracks were needed for the Let It Be album, as the threat of legal action by American film company United Artists led to a decision to finally prepare the Get Back recordings and footage for release. In March, producer Phil Spector was invited to work on the tapes. Although McCartney has claimed that he was unaware of Spector's involvement until receiving an acetate of the Let It Be album in April, Peter Doggett writes of work being delayed for "several weeks" until McCartney returned "a string of messages" requesting his approval for Spector to start working on the tapes.

Once Lennon, Harrison and Starr became aware that McCartney intended to release his solo album on 17 April, the date was immediately deemed an issue, due to the existing items on the Apple release schedule – Let It Be and Starr's own solo debut, Sentimental Journey. On 31 March, Starr went to McCartney's house to tell him personally of the decision to delay the release of McCartney, news to which he reacted badly, dismissing Starr from his home and refusing to cede the date agreed to with Aspinall. Stunned at his bandmate's outburst, Starr relayed the situation to Harrison and Lennon, and McCartney's album was reinstated on the release schedule for 17 April. McCartney's bitterness over this episode contributed to him publicly announcing his departure from the Beatles. He also cited Spector's treatment of some songs on the Let It Be album, particularly "The Long and Winding Road", as another factor. The chronological relevance of the latter claim is disputed by Starr, however, who stated that, when acetates of the album were sent out for each of the Beatles' approval, on 2 April: "We all said yes. Even at the beginning Paul said yes. I spoke to him on the phone, and said, 'Did you like it?' and he said, 'Yeah, it's OK.' He didn't put it down."

McCartney's announcement came via a press release distributed to select UK journalists on 9 April, with advance copies of McCartney. The press release took the form of a Q&A in which McCartney discussed his album and, with Lennon's exit still being withheld from the public for business reasons, matters pertaining to the Beatles' immediate future. McCartney did not state that the group had broken up, but he talked of his "break with the Beatles" and having no plans to work with the band in the future; he also emphasised his distance from Klein's management and ruled out the likelihood of ever writing songs with Lennon again. Although McCartney said that Apple's press officer, Derek Taylor, submitted the questions, Taylor said that those concerning the Beatles were added by McCartney. (Note: Peter Brown, another Apple executive who helped in the promotion, said that all the questions were written by McCartney.)

Amid the uproar that ensued, McCartney returned to the issue of Spector's work on Let It Be. McCartney had conceived of "The Long and Winding Road" as a simple piano ballad, but Spector overdubbed orchestral and female choral accompaniment. On 14 April, McCartney sent a letter to Klein demanding that the new instrumentation be reduced, the harp part removed, and added: "Don't ever do it again." Arriving twelve days after Spector had distributed the acetates with a request for any of the Beatles to contact him immediately with proposed changes, McCartney's demands went unheeded. Klein claimed to have sent McCartney a telegram in reply to the 14 April letter (McCartney having changed his telephone number without informing Apple), but he received no response. Klein therefore went ahead with the manufacturing of the new Beatles album. McCartney blamed Klein for Spector's involvement, since Klein had brought the producer over to London to work with the Beatles. McCartney resolved to end his ties to Apple and the Beatles as the only means to extricate himself from Klein.

=== Aftermath and reaction ===
Newspapers around the world interpreted McCartney's remarks as an announcement that the band had broken up. On 10 April, having been among the recipients of the Q&A, Don Short of The Daily Mirror reported on McCartney's departure from the Beatles under the front-page headline "Paul Quits The Beatles". McCartney's bandmates viewed his announcement as a betrayal, particularly since he had used it to promote his solo album. He was vilified by the group's fans and the press for his perceived role in the break-up. McCartney later said that he did not view his comments in the self-interview as an official announcement. According to Beatles confidant Ray Connolly, McCartney was "devastated" at the reaction his words had caused.

From 10 April, reporters and some of the band's fans began gathering outside the Apple Corps offices at 3 Savile Row. A CBS News team reported that "The event is so momentous that historians may, one day, view it as a landmark in the decline of the British Empire ... The Beatles are breaking up." Inside Apple, where he was being filmed for an episode of the BBC1 program Fact or Fantasy?, Harrison refused to speak to the media; after completing the filming, he watched an early edit of the documentary film The Long and Winding Road (later expanded into the 1995 series The Beatles Anthology). Asked for their response to McCartney's comments, Starr said, "This is all news to me", and Lennon said: "It was nice to find that he was still alive. Anyway, you can say I said jokingly, 'He didn't quit, I sacked him!'" Taylor issued a press release, which stated in part:

[The Beatles] do not want to split up, but the present rift seems to be part of their growing up ... at the moment they seem to cramp each other's styles. Paul has called a halt to the Beatles' activities. They could be dormant for years ... It is no secret that Klein and Paul have never hit it off ... He opposed the appointment of Klein and wanted to make his father-in-law [Lee] Eastman, a New York lawyer, manager.

In the 18 April issue of Melody Maker, Richard Williams commented that, since the Q&A did not categorically state that McCartney had left the Beatles or would never record with them again, "What else is new? All these facts existed at the time of Abbey Road, but it didn't stop that album being made." Williams dismissed the news as "possibly the non-event of the year", since he believed the Beatles would continue as before. In an interview for Rolling Stone that week, Lennon said that it was merely McCartney "causing chaos" in the same way that he used to "sulk" if Epstein would not let him have his way. Lennon also said: "The cartoon is this – four guys on a stage with a spotlight on them; second picture, three guys on stage breezing out of the spotlight; third picture, one guy standing there shouting 'I'm leaving.'"

In an interview he gave in New York in late April, Harrison stated that, even though he was about to record a solo album with Spector as his producer, it would be "very selfish" if the Beatles did not put aside their differences and record together again soon, given how much their music meant to listeners around the world. He said that, from its launch in 1968, McCartney had led Apple into financial problems and the others had then had to step in and try to remedy the situation. McCartney was unable to accept that he had less control than before, Harrison continued, and that, with their appointment of Klein, the others were putting the Beatles and Apple first rather than "trying to do what's best for Paul and his in-laws". Harrison's message that the Beatles would regroup after each member had completed their solo projects was syndicated internationally. Lennon also suggested that he was interested in recording again with the Beatles, saying of the current turn of events: "It could be a rebirth or a death. We'll see what it is. It'll probably be a rebirth."

== High Court suit and public sparring ==
McCartney's wish to dissolve the 1967 partnership was problematic, since it would expose them all to enormous tax liability, and his pleas to be released from Apple were ignored by Lennon, Harrison and Starr. McCartney said he struggled all through the summer of 1970 with the idea of having to sue his bandmates in order to be free of Apple and Klein. Anticipating the suit, Klein suggested that the other Beatles invite McCartney to a recording session in October where Lennon and Harrison were due to work on Starr's song "Early 1970". Klein reasoned that if McCartney attended, it would show that the Beatles' musical partnership was still active and undermine McCartney's case. McCartney did not accept the invitation. In December, Harrison and McCartney met in New York to discuss their differences but the meeting went badly. The press nevertheless interpreted the meeting as a truce between the two parties and, since Lennon was also in New York that month, reports insisted that the Beatles would soon re-form.

On 31 December, McCartney filed a lawsuit against the other three Beatles in London's High Court of Justice for dissolution of the band's contractual partnership. For Beatles fans, news of McCartney's legal action and the publication of Lennon's two-part "Lennon Remembers" interview in Rolling Stone increased the distasteful atmosphere surrounding the group's demise. (Note: In addition, McCartney took out full-page advertisements in the music press, in which, as an act of mockery towards Lennon and Ono, he and Linda extended Christmas greetings while dressed in clown costumes and wrapped up in a bag.) Time magazine dubbed the confrontation "Beatledämmerung", in reference to Wagner's opera about a war among the gods. By contrast, according to Guardian journalist Kitty Empire, writing in 2011, Harrison's All Things Must Pass triple album "functioned as a kind of repository for grief" for the band's fans. In Doggett's description, the Beatles-related songs on Harrison's album "offered a teasing glimpse into an intimate world that had previously been off-limits to the public", and they introduced a self-referential trait in the ex-Beatles' songwriting that, for fans and the press, came to represent episodes in a public soap opera.

The case opened in the Chancery Division of the High Court on 19 January 1971. McCartney's counsel, David Hirst, told the court that the Beatles' finances were in a "grave state" and outlined the three reasons behind McCartney's claim for dissolution: the group had long ceased working together; in appointing Klein as the band's exclusive business manager, the other Beatles had acted in breach of the partnership deed; and throughout the four years of its existence, McCartney had yet to receive audited accounts of the partnership. On 18 February, the day before proceedings began, the press announced three further reasons: Klein's attempt to postpone the release of McCartney; Klein and ABKCO's altering of "The Long and Winding Road" without first consulting McCartney; and ABKCO's transferral of the Let It Be film rights from Apple to United Artists without McCartney's approval.

During the subsequent proceedings, McCartney's legal team focused on portraying Klein as a disreputable businessman, and McCartney took the stand to state the case that the Beatles had long ceased to be a functioning band and their differences were irreconcilable. The court heard affidavits from Lennon, Harrison and Starr in which they stated their past difficulties of working with McCartney but said that these had largely been surmounted and there was no reason that the band could not continue. On 12 March, High Court judge Blanshard Stamp found in McCartney's favour and a receiver was appointed.

McCartney released his second album, Ram, in May. It included a riposte to "Lennon Remembers" with the song "Too Many People", in which, he told Playboy in 1984, he addressed Lennon's "preaching". Lennon detected other examples of McCartney attacking him within the album's lyrics and responded with the song "How Do You Sleep?" Harrison and Starr (the latter a non-participant) joined Lennon for the recording of "How Do You Sleep?", which was released on Lennon's Imagine album in September. Lennon and McCartney continued their public feud through the letters page of Melody Maker, with some of Lennon's correspondence requiring censorship by the magazine's editor. McCartney later wrote "Dear Friend", a truce offering to Lennon, and included it on the album Wild Life with his band, Wings, in December.

== Legal dissolution ==
The subsequent negotiations were lengthy as McCartney continued to demand his freedom from the Beatles and Apple, yet his own advisors were now giving him the same warnings regarding the potential tax liability as Klein had identified. The other Beatles soon came to doubt Klein's ability to negotiate a successful settlement with McCartney, given the pair's ongoing antipathy; they were also disillusioned with Klein for his mismanagement of Harrison's Bangladesh aid project, and Lennon felt betrayed by Klein's lack of support for his and Ono's increasingly political music. Lennon, Harrison and Starr formally severed their ties with Klein in March 1973, initiating a wave of lawsuits in London and New York. In November, they sued Klein for misrepresentation and breach of fiduciary duty. Klein then countersued Apple for $19 million in unpaid fees. The cases were settled out of court in January 1977 with Apple paying Klein $5,009,200, equivalent to approximately £2.9 million at the time. Klein credited the "tireless efforts and Kissinger-like negotiating brilliance of Yoko Ono Lennon" in achieving a settlement to his satisfaction.

With Klein no longer managing Apple, the four former bandmates were able to work cooperatively towards a settlement. This document, known as "The Beatles Agreement", was signed by the four in December 1974. Photographer Bob Gruen recalled Lennon's bemusement at the length and intricacy of the settlement document, saying: "He told me that the original agreement between Klein and the Beatles had been two or three paragraphs on a single piece of paper. Now it was going to take an eighty-seven-page document to dissolve." The formal dissolution of the partnership took place in London on 9 January 1975. Apple Corps was not dissolved and as of January 2026 is still operating.

== Partial and attempted reunions in the 1970s ==
During the 1970s, the band members occasionally collaborated, but never with all four Beatles simultaneously. In a 1971 interview, Lennon stated that he could not foresee working with McCartney again, though "Maybe about a year or two after all the money thing's settled, we might have dinner or forget about it." He was nonetheless willing to collaborate with Harrison and Starr; Harrison and Starr often performed on each other's records and separately on Lennon's. McCartney opted against using the pool of session musicians favoured by his bandmates and reflected: "I felt that it was a bit too predictable, that everyone would leave the Beatles and go with old Phil Spector, or the drummer Jim Keltner. It was like a clique, and I just didn't want to join that clique."

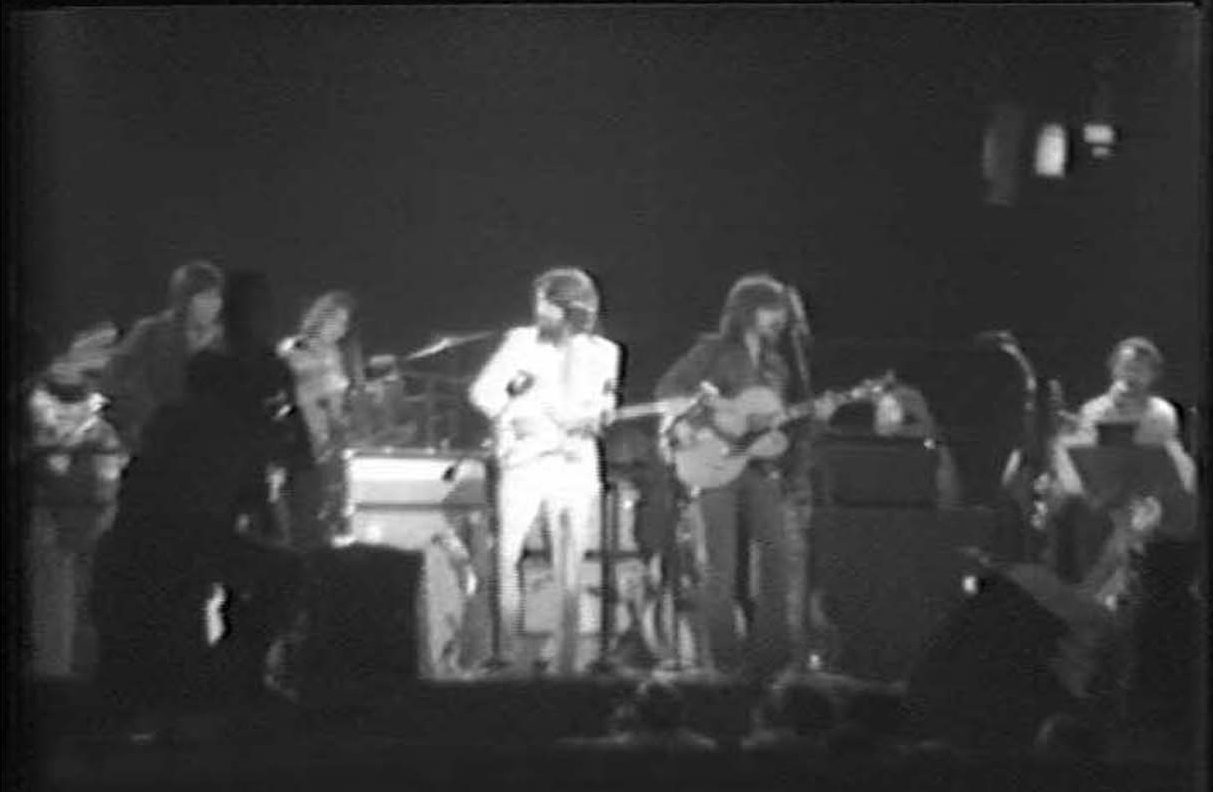
Harrison at the Concert for Bangladesh, August 1971

In 1971, Harrison invited his former bandmates to perform with him at the Concert for Bangladesh in August. Starr accepted, but Lennon and McCartney did not. McCartney refused because he was wary of Klein potentially taking the credit for having organised a Beatles reunion. Lennon agreed on the condition that Ono could also participate, but Harrison politely stated that he invited Ono to be in the audience, not on the stage. He refused to invite Ono on the grounds that the concert was intended as an exclusive gathering of rock stars, not an avant-garde festival. (Note: Lennon's condition and Harrison's refusal were not publicly known until after Lennon's death.) Following the concert, much of the media attention was focused on the ostensible reunion of Starr and Harrison.

In March 1973, Harrison joined Lennon, Starr and bassist Klaus Voormann for the recording of "I'm the Greatest", released on Starr's 1973 album Ringo. To Lennon's dismay, Harrison suggested that they form a group with this line-up. Amid the numerous financial and legal disputes plaguing the foursome, Lennon stated: "The only talk about Beatle reunions comes from people at the side of the Beatles who want to put us together and make millions and millions of dollars. And I'm not interested in that, or in playing with the old team again." However, he also said, "There's always a chance [of us reuniting]. As far as I can gather from talking to them all, nobody would mind doing some work together again. But if we did do something, I'm sure it wouldn't be permanent. We'd do it just for that moment." At Starr's request, McCartney also appears on Ringo, for the song "Six O'Clock". This made it the only post-breakup album to include compositions and performances by all four former Beatles, albeit on separate songs.

Later in 1973, McCartney attempted to organise a reunion as a means of mitigating their collective legal burden. In February 1974, it was widely reported that the Beatles would soon reform, but although all four members were present in Los Angeles the next month, they chose not to meet. During the promotional run for his December album Dark Horse, Harrison remarked: "It's all a fantasy, putting the Beatles back together. If we ever do that, it's because everybody is broke. ... Having played with other musicians, I don't think the Beatles were that good ... I'd join a band with John Lennon any day, but I couldn't join a band with Paul. That's not personal, but from a musical point of view."

With their business quarrels settled in early 1975, Lennon found himself keen to approach songwriting with McCartney again. McCartney, according to his wife Linda, was likewise "desperate to write with John again" and invited Lennon to a recording session in New Orleans. By this time, Lennon had separated from Ono and had entered a romantic partnership with May Pang. According to Pang, Ono phoned Lennon at the end of January and "told him ... that he should come over to the Dakota. I told him I didn't like him going over there, and he said, 'Stop it!'. He was yelling at me, 'What's your problem? I'll be home by dinner; we'll go have a late dinner, and then we'll make plans to go to New Orleans and see Paul and Linda.'" Pang said that when he returned that night, "He was a different person about Paul. It wasn't the same. He was saying, 'Oh, you know when Paul and Linda used to visit us? Well, I couldn't stand it.'" Lennon subsequently stayed with Ono until his death; he later told Taylor that Linda was repeatedly suggesting that he work with McCartney again, but, "I can't really see it myself."

On 19 May 1979, three of the ex-Beatles (McCartney, Harrison, and Starr) attended Pattie Boyd and Eric Clapton's wedding reception. The three ex-Beatles performed a concert at Boyd and Clapton's wedding, marking the first time at least three former Beatles performed live together since 1969. Boyd wrote in her memoirs that she heard from John Lennon afterwards that he would have attended if he had known about it. She expressed her regret that it, and the four of them performing together, never happened and soon afterwards never would happen.

== Entrepreneurial offers ==
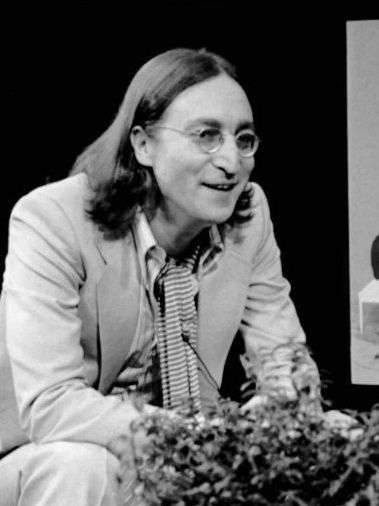
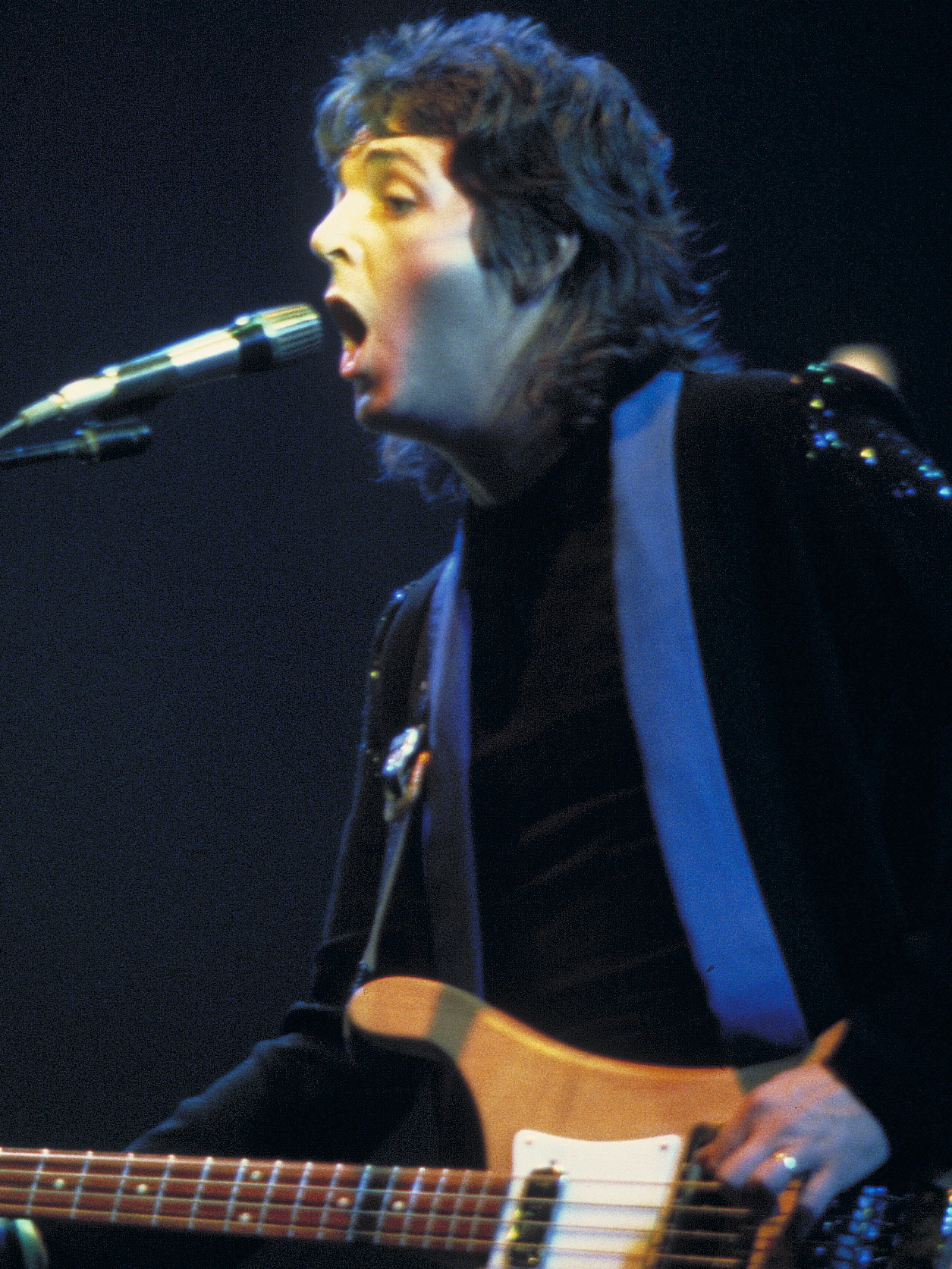
Lennon in 1975 and McCartney in 1976

A wave of Beatles nostalgia and persistent reunion rumours in the US during the 1970s led several entrepreneurs to make public offers to the Beatles for a reunion concert.

- 1974 – Promoter Bill Sargent first offered the Beatles $10 million for a reunion concert. He raised his offer to $30 million in January 1976 and then to $50 million the following month.
- 24 April 1976 – During a broadcast of Saturday Night Live, producer Lorne Michaels offered the Beatles $3,000 to reunite on the show. Lennon and McCartney were watching the live broadcast at Lennon's apartment at the Dakota in New York, which was within walking distance of the NBC studio where the show was being broadcast. The former bandmates briefly entertained the idea of going to the studio and surprising Michaels by accepting his offer, but decided not to as they were simply too tired.
- June 1976 – Entrepreneur Alan Amron created the International Committee to Reunite the Beatles, asking Beatles fans worldwide to send in one dollar to then offer the money to the Beatles to reunite.
- September 1976 – Concert promoter Sid Bernstein ran full-page newspaper advertisements inviting the Beatles to reunite for a concert that would raise $230 million for charity.
- January 1977 – Amron partnered with boxer Muhammad Ali for a proposal to the Beatles to reunite to help create a $200 million charity fund.
- March 1978 – An environmental group called Project Interspeak announced to the media that they were planning a concert to raise money for anti-whaling efforts and suggested the Beatles would participate.
- September 1979 – Bernstein again appealed to the Beatles with a full-page newspaper advertisement asking them to perform three concerts to benefit the Vietnamese boat people. At the same time another effort to reunite the Beatles for the same cause was sponsored by United Nations Secretary-General Kurt Waldheim. Those discussions led to the Concerts for the People of Kampuchea in December featuring McCartney and his band Wings but not the rumoured Beatles reunion.

== Collaborations after Lennon's murder ==
After Lennon's murder in 1980, Harrison tailored the lyrics to his song "All Those Years Ago" to serve as a personal tribute to Lennon. The song was originally offered to Starr, who played drums on the basic track, which was recorded prior to Lennon's death. McCartney (along with his Wings bandmates Linda McCartney and Denny Laine) overdubbed backing vocals.

In 1994 and 1995, the remaining three reunited for the Anthology project, using the unfinished Lennon demos "Free as a Bird" and "Real Love" as a basis for new songs recorded and released as the Beatles. Also attempted were "Grow Old with Me" and "Now and Then", by Lennon, and the rumoured McCartney/Harrison collaboration "All for Love". These sessions were marked by tension, particularly between Harrison and McCartney. At the time, Harrison wryly commented that he felt the sessions were "just like being back in the Beatles", while McCartney later said: "George had some business problems and it didn't do a lot for his moods over the last couple of years. He's not been that easy to get on with."

More than 20 years after Harrison's death in 2001, "Now and Then" was completed by McCartney and Starr, and was released as a new Beatles single in 2023.

== See also ==
- Outline of the Beatles
- The Beatles timeline

== Sources ==
- Badman, Keith (2001). The Beatles Diary Volume 2: After the Break-Up 1970–2001. London: Omnibus Press. ISBN 978-0-7119-8307-6.
- The Beatles (2000). The Beatles Anthology. San Francisco, CA: Chronicle Books. ISBN 0-8118-2684-8.
- Brown, Peter; Gaines, Steven (2002) [1983]. The Love You Make: An Insider's Story of the Beatles. New York, NY: New American Library. ISBN 978-0-4512-0735-7.
- Clayson, Alan (2003a). George Harrison. London: Sanctuary. ISBN 1-86074-489-3.
- Clayson, Alan (2003b). Ringo Starr. London: Sanctuary. ISBN 1-86074-488-5.
- Coleman, Ray (1984). Lennon. McGraw-Hill. ISBN 0-07-011786-1.
- Doggett, Peter (2009). The Art and Music of John Lennon. Omnibus Press. ISBN 978-0-85712-126-4.
- Doggett, Peter (2011). You Never Give Me Your Money: The Beatles After the Breakup. New York, NY: It Books. ISBN 978-0-06-177418-8.
- The Editors of Rolling Stone (2002). Harrison. New York, NY: Rolling Stone Press. ISBN 978-0-7432-3581-5.
- Emerick, Geoff; Massey, Howard (2006). Here, There and Everywhere: My Life Recording the Music of The Beatles. New York, NY: Gotham. ISBN 978-1-59240-179-6.
- Goodman, Fred (2015). Allen Klein: The Man Who Bailed Out the Beatles, Made the Stones, and Transformed Rock & Roll. Boston, New York: Houghton Mifflin Harcourt. ISBN 978-0-547-89686-1.
- Gould, Jonathan (2007). Can't Buy Me Love: The Beatles, Britain, and America. New York, NY: Harmony Books. ISBN 978-0-307-35337-5.
- Harry, Bill (2000). The John Lennon Encyclopedia. London: Virgin Books. ISBN 978-0-7535-0404-8.
- Harry, Bill (2002). The Paul McCartney Encyclopedia. London: Virgin. ISBN 978-0-7535-0716-2.
- Hertsgaard, Mark (1996). A Day in the Life: The Music and Artistry of the Beatles. London: Pan Books. ISBN 0-330-33891-9.
- Hunt, Chris, ed. (2005). NME Originals: Beatles – The Solo Years 1970–1980. London: IPC Ignite!.
- Ingham, Chris (2006). The Rough Guide to the Beatles (2nd edn). London: Rough Guides/Penguin. ISBN 978-1-84836-525-4.
- Leng, Simon (2006). While My Guitar Gently Weeps: The Music of George Harrison. Milwaukee, WI: Hal Leonard. ISBN 978-1-4234-0609-9.
- Lewisohn, Mark (2005) [1988]. The Complete Beatles Recording Sessions: The Official Story of the Abbey Road Years 1962–1970. London: Bounty Books. ISBN 978-0-7537-2545-0.
- Lewisohn, Mark (2010) [1992]. The Complete Beatles Chronicle: The Definitive Day-by-Day Guide to the Beatles' Entire Career. Chicago, IL: Chicago Review Press. ISBN 978-1-56976-534-0.
- MacDonald, Ian (1998). Revolution in the Head: The Beatles' Records and the Sixties. London: Pimlico. ISBN 0-7126-6697-4.
- Miles, Barry (2001). The Beatles Diary Volume 1: The Beatles Years. London: Omnibus Press. ISBN 0-7119-8308-9.
- Miles, Barry (1997). Paul McCartney: Many Years from Now. Vintage. ISBN 978-0-7493-8658-0.
- Mojo: The Beatles' Final Years Special Edition. London: Emap. 2003.
- The New Rolling Stone Encyclopedia of Rock & Roll. New York, NY: Fireside/Rolling Stone Press. 1995. ISBN 0-684-81044-1.
- Norman, Philip (2008). John Lennon: The Life. New York, NY: Ecco. ISBN 978-0-06-075402-0.
- Rodriguez, Robert (2010). Fab Four FAQ 2.0: The Beatles' Solo Years, 1970–1980. Milwaukee, WI: Backbeat Books. ISBN 978-1-4165-9093-4.
- Rodriguez, Robert (2012). Revolver: How the Beatles Reimagined Rock 'n' Roll. Milwaukee, WI: Backbeat Books. ISBN 978-1-61713-009-0.
- Schaffner, Nicholas (1978). The Beatles Forever. New York, NY: McGraw-Hill. ISBN 0-07-055087-5.
- Snow, Mat (2013). The Beatles Solo: The Illustrated Chronicles of John, Paul, George, and Ringo After The Beatles (Volume 3: George). New York, NY: Race Point Publishing. ISBN 978-1-937994-26-6.
- Soocher, Stan (2015). Baby You're a Rich Man: Suing the Beatles for Fun and Profit. Lebanon, NH: University Press of New England. ISBN 978-1-61168-380-6.
- Sounes, Howard (2010). Fab: An Intimate Life of Paul McCartney. London: HarperCollins. ISBN 978-0-00-723705-0.
- Spizer, Bruce (2005). The Beatles Solo on Apple Records. New Orleans, LA: 498 Productions. ISBN 0-9662649-5-9.
- Sulpy, Doug; Schweighardt, Ray (1997). Get Back: The Unauthorized Chronicle of The Beatles' Let It Be Disaster. New York, NY: St. Martin's Griffin. ISBN 0-312-19981-3.
- Sutherland, Steve, ed. (2003). NME Originals: Lennon. London: IPC Ignite!.
- Turner, Steve (1999). A Hard Day's Write: The Stories Behind Every Beatles Song (2nd edn). New York, NY: Carlton/HarperCollins. ISBN 0-06-273698-1.
- Wiener, Jon (1991). Come Together: John Lennon in His Time. Urbana, IL: University of Illinois Press. ISBN 978-0-252-06131-8.
- Williams, Richard (2003). Phil Spector: Out of His Head. London: Omnibus Press. ISBN 978-0-7119-9864-3.
- Winn, John C. (2009). That Magic Feeling: The Beatles' Recorded Legacy, Volume Two, 1966–1970. New York, NY: Three Rivers Press. ISBN 978-0-307-45239-9.
- Woffinden, Bob (1981). The Beatles Apart. London: Proteus. ISBN 0-906071-89-5.
- Womack, Kenneth, ed. (2009). The Cambridge Companion to the Beatles. Cambridge Companions to Music. Cambridge University Press. ISBN 978-1-139-82806-2.
- Womack, Kenneth (15 October 2019). Solid State: The Story of "Abbey Road" and the End of the Beatles. Cornell University Press. ISBN 978-1-5017-4686-4.
