= Vegan design =

Use of vegan products in design

Vegan design is the use of vegan products in such contexts as interior design, fashion design, household goods and the arts. Such products are also known as "humane" or "cruelty-free" and "[do] not originate from any living creature, [are] not an animal byproduct and [are] not tested on animals".

Vegan design is seen as an outgrowth of the vegan food movement, based on related ethical stances and claims of sustainability. Not all designers who practice vegan design, however, agree on the underlying claims, such as those for sustainability.

The first exhibition dealing with veganism took place in Eindhoven, the Netherlands, in October 2016. During Salone Del Mobile 2018, an exhibition called Vegan Design or The Art of Reduction brought the subject to the forefront.

Materials used by vegan designers are often plant-based. Examples include leather substitutes made from pineapple, and apple skins and cores. Feathers and wool may be replaced with materials from buckwheat, bamboo or cotton.
