= The Black Album (compilation album) =

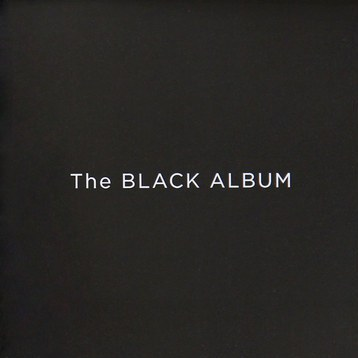

Compilation album by the Beatles
- Released: 21 July 2014
- Recorded: December 1969 – February 1995
- Genres: Rock, pop
- Length: 3:17:11
- Compiler: Ethan Hawke

The Black Album (stylised as The BLACK ALBUM) is an unofficial compilation album of solo material by members of the British rock group the Beatles. It was created by the American actor Ethan Hawke, and became widely known as a result of its inclusion in Richard Linklater's 2014 film Boyhood. Hawke compiled the record to give to his daughter Maya on her 13th birthday in 2011, including personalised liner notes; it was then incorporated into Boyhood in scenes shot later that year, with Hawke's character giving it to his son as a birthday present.

The compilation contains 51 tracks from Beatles members following the band's breakup in 1970. Critical reaction to The Black Album was generally positive: The Desert Sun described it as "a great listen", while USA Today called it "quite a compilation". In an analysis for the New York Daily News, Jim Farber suggested that the record was "a metaphor for divorce".

== Concept ==
A lifelong fan of the Beatles, Hawke compiled The Black Album for his daughter Maya following his divorce from her mother Uma Thurman, and presented it to her on her 13th birthday on 8 July 2011. The record consisted of 51 songs from the Beatles' members following their breakup in 1970. John Lennon had 19 songs on the compilation from his solo career and his collaborations with the Plastic Ono Band, Paul McCartney had 20 from his solo career and his collaborations with Wings and Linda McCartney, George Harrison had seven songs from his solo career, and Ringo Starr had four. Additionally, the song "Real Love"—a Lennon demo reworked and overdubbed by McCartney, Harrison and Starr for the compilation Anthology 2—was included on The Black Album. Included with the three-disc collection was a set of liner notes in the form of a personalised letter from Hawke to his daughter, explaining his motivation for creating the album.

== Usage in Boyhood ==
"Mason, I wanted to give you something for your birthday that money couldn't buy, something that only a father could give a son, like a family heirloom. This is the best I could do."

— Mason Sr. explains The Black Album

Since 2002, Hawke had been starring in Boyhood, an ongoing 12-year film project directed by the American director Richard Linklater. Boyhood chronicles the life of Mason Evans (Ellar Coltrane) from the ages of six to 18, with scenes shot each year between 2002 and 2013. Hawke portrays Mason's father, Mason Evans Sr. While filming scenes in 2011 for Mason's 15th birthday, Linklater decided to incorporate The Black Album into the film, by having Mason Sr. gift the compilation to his son as a birthday present. In the film, Mason Sr. explains: "Whenever you listen to too much of the solo stuff it kind of becomes a drag, you know? But you put them next to each other, right, and they start to elevate each other. And then you can hear it: it's the Beatles." He describes the record as being the "perfect segue" of solo Beatles material.

During promotion of the film, Linklater was asked at a Q&A in Chicago if the album actually existed. Linklater confirmed that it did, and explained that he and Hawke were looking for a way to distribute its full track listing to the public. Hawke eventually revealed the track listing and an adaptation of its liner notes on 21 July 2014 in an exclusive article for the website BuzzFeed.

== Reception ==
Critical reaction to Hawke's compilation was generally positive. In an analysis of The Black Album, Jim Farber of the New York Daily News suggested that the record was "a metaphor for divorce", and noted that Hawke had selected tracks that were recorded as the Beatles' members were approaching maturity and writing songs about more mature subject matter. Trey Barrineau of USA Today said the album was "quite a compilation", while Peter Howell of the Toronto Star called it "unique". The Desert Sun described it as "a great listen" and were inspired to create their own shorter version of the album, which featured only 12 tracks consisting of solo material from 1970 to 1971.

== Track listing ==
Disc one
No.	Title	Artist	Length
1.	"Band on the Run" (from Band on the Run, 1973)	Paul McCartney & Wings	5:10
2.	"My Sweet Lord" (from All Things Must Pass, 1970)	George Harrison	4:38
3.	"Jealous Guy" (from Imagine, 1971)	John Lennon	4:17
4.	"Photograph" (from Ringo, 1973)	Ringo Starr	3:56
5.	"How?" (from Imagine, 1971)	John Lennon	3:43
6.	"Every Night" (from McCartney, 1970)	Paul McCartney	2:31
7.	"Blow Away" (from George Harrison, 1979)	George Harrison	4:00
8.	"Maybe I'm Amazed" (from McCartney, 1970)	Paul McCartney	3:53
9.	"Woman" (from Double Fantasy, 1980)	John Lennon	3:32
10.	"Jet" (from Band on the Run, 1973)	Paul McCartney & Wings	4:06
11.	"Stand by Me" (from Rock 'n' Roll, 1975)	John Lennon	3:26
12.	"No No Song" (from Goodnight Vienna, 1974)	Ringo Starr	2:33
13.	"Junk" (from McCartney, 1970)	Paul McCartney	1:54
14.	"Love" (from John Lennon/Plastic Ono Band, 1970)	John Lennon	3:21
15.	"The Back Seat of My Car" (from Ram, 1971)	Paul McCartney & Linda McCartney	4:26
16.	"Watching the Wheels" (from Double Fantasy, 1980)	John Lennon	3:35
17.	"Mind Games" (from Mind Games, 1973)	John Lennon	4:13
18.	"Bluebird" (from Band on the Run, 1973)	Paul McCartney & Wings	3:22
19.	"Beautiful Boy (Darling Boy)" (from Double Fantasy, 1980)	John Lennon	4:02
20.	"What Is Life" (from All Things Must Pass, 1970)	George Harrison	4:22
Total length:			75:00

Disc two
No.	Title	Artist	Length
1.	"God" (from John Lennon/Plastic Ono Band, 1970)	John Lennon	4:09
2.	"Listen to What the Man Said" (from Venus and Mars, 1975)	Wings	4:01
3.	"Crippled Inside" (from Imagine, 1971)	John Lennon	3:47
4.	"You're Sixteen" (from Ringo, 1973)	Ringo Starr	2:48
5.	"Let Me Roll It" (from Band on the Run, 1973)	Paul McCartney & Wings	4:47
6.	"Power to the People" (from "Power to the People", 1971)	John Lennon/Plastic Ono Band	3:22
7.	"Another Day" (from "Another Day", 1971)	Paul McCartney	3:41
8.	"If Not For You (2001 Digital Remaster)" (from All Things Must Pass, 1970)	George Harrison	3:29
9.	"(Just Like) Starting Over" (from Double Fantasy, 1980)	John Lennon	3:56
10.	"Let 'Em In" (from Wings at the Speed of Sound, 1976)	Wings	5:10
11.	"Mother" (from John Lennon/Plastic Ono Band, 1970)	John Lennon	5:34
12.	"Helen Wheels" (from "Helen Wheels", 1973)	Paul McCartney & Wings	3:44
13.	"I Found Out" (from John Lennon/Plastic Ono Band, 1970)	John Lennon	3:37
14.	"Uncle Albert/Admiral Halsey" (from Ram, 1971)	Paul McCartney & Linda McCartney	4:49
15.	"Instant Karma!" (from "Instant Karma!", 1970)	Lennon/Ono with the Plastic Ono Band	3:21
16.	"Not Guilty (2004 Digital Remaster)" (from George Harrison, 1979)	George Harrison	3:35
17.	"Heart of the Country" (from Ram, 1971)	Paul McCartney & Linda McCartney	2:23
18.	"Oh Yoko!" (from Imagine, 1971)	John Lennon	4:20
19.	"Mull of Kintyre" (from "Mull of Kintyre", 1977)	Wings	4:44
20.	"It Don't Come Easy" (from "It Don't Come Easy", 1971)	Ringo Starr	3:00
Total length:			78:17

Disc three
No.	Title	Artist	Length
1.	"Grow Old with Me (2010 Remaster)" (from Milk and Honey, 1984)	John Lennon	3:07
2.	"Silly Love Songs" (from Wings at the Speed of Sound, 1976)	Wings	5:54
3.	"Real Love" (from Anthology 2, 1996)	The Beatles	3:54
4.	"My Love" (from Red Rose Speedway, 1973)	Paul McCartney & Wings	4:08
5.	"Oh My Love" (from Imagine, 1971)	John Lennon	2:50
6.	"Give Me Love (Give Me Peace on Earth)" (from Living in the Material World, 1973)	George Harrison	3:36
7.	"Pipes of Peace" (from Pipes of Peace, 1983)	Paul McCartney	3:56
8.	"Imagine" (from Imagine, 1971)	John Lennon	3:01
9.	"Here Today" (from Tug of War, 1982)	Paul McCartney	2:27
10.	"All Things Must Pass" (from All Things Must Pass, 1970)	George Harrison	3:44
11.	"And I Love Her" (from Unplugged (The Official Bootleg), 1991)	Paul McCartney	4:17
Total length:			40:54

== See also ==
Works that explore similar concepts

- Everyday Chemistry
- "The Twelfth Album"
