= The Twelfth Album =

1998 short story by Stephen Baxter

- Short story by Stephen Baxter
- The album cover of "God" as it is described in the story
- Language: English
- Genres: Alternative history, science fiction

Publication
- Published in: Interzone (magazine)
- Publication type: Print (Magazine)
- Publication date: April 1998

"The Twelfth Album" is an alternative history short story by Stephen Baxter, first published in Interzone in April 1998. It is about an imaginary twelfth album recorded by the Beatles, called God. The album features songs that were written and recorded as solo projects by the group's members in reality, but in a parallel universe where the Beatles did not split up following the release of Let It Be, resulting in these songs being recorded by the group. In the universe where it was recorded, the Earth was apparently destroyed by a hail of comets, which shocks the two middle-aged men who find the album in their deceased workmate's room on board the docked Titanic Hotel in Liverpool.

In reality, the Beatles did release twelve albums, thirteen if Magical Mystery Tour is included. The story ignores one of them, Yellow Submarine, because it is considered by the characters more a George Martin score than a Beatles album, and the other, Magical Mystery Tour, was only released as an EP in the United Kingdom until 1976.

== Track listing ==
Side 1

1. "Gimme Some Truth", actually released on John Lennon's Imagine album.
2. "It Don't Come Easy", from Ringo Starr's 1971 non-album single
3. "Every Night", from Paul McCartney's album McCartney
4. "All Things Must Pass", from George Harrison's album All Things Must Pass.
5. "Child of Nature", a Lennon song auditioned for The White Album that later had its lyrics rewritten to become "Jealous Guy" from Imagine.
6. "The Back Seat of My Car", a McCartney duet with Linda McCartney from their album Ram. On the God album, the song is a traditional Beatles three part harmony.

Side 2

1. "Instant Karma!", the famous Lennon single.
2. "Isn't It a Pity", a Harrison song, auditioned during the Get Back/Let It Be sessions, later two versions were recorded and released on All Things Must Pass.
3. "Junk", a McCartney song auditioned during the Get Back/Let It Be sessions, later recorded for McCartney.
4. "Wah-Wah", a Harrison solo song released on All Things Must Pass.
5. "God", a Lennon song from Plastic Ono Band.
6. "Maybe I'm Amazed", a McCartney song from McCartney. This version, in the story, is a full Beatles recording, with Lennon providing vocals.

== See also ==
- The Black Album – a compilation album that explores a similar concept
- Everyday Chemistry
