= Teddy Boy (song) =

1970 song by Paul McCartney

- Cover of the song's sheet music

Song by Paul McCartney

from the album McCartney
- Released: 17 April 1970
- Recorded: December 1969 – February 1970
- Studio: Morgan and McCartney's home, London
- Length: 2:25
- Label: Apple
- Songwriter: Paul McCartney
- Producer: Paul McCartney

McCartney track listing
- 13 tracks Side one: 1. "The Lovely Linda"; 2. "That Would Be Something"; 3. "Valentine Day"; 4. "Every Night"; 5. "Hot as Sun/Glasses"; 6. "Junk"; 7. "Man We Was Lonely"; Side two: 8. "Oo You"; 9. "Momma Miss America"; 10. "Teddy Boy"; 11. "Singalong Junk"; 12. "Maybe I'm Amazed"; 13. "Kreen-Akrore"

"Teddy Boy" is a song by Paul McCartney included on his first solo album McCartney, released in April 1970. According to Ernie Santosuosso of The Boston Globe, it describes the way in which a close relationship between a widow and her grown son Teddy boy is destroyed by her new romantic interest.

== Background ==
Paul McCartney wrote "Teddy Boy" during the Beatles' 1968 visit to India. In 1970, McCartney described the song as, "Another song I started in India and completed in Scotland, and London gradually. This one was recorded for the Get Back film, but later not used."

== Recording ==
=== January 1969 ===
"Teddy Boy"

Song by the Beatles

from the album Anthology 3
- Released: 28 October 1996
- Recorded: 24 and 28 January 1969
- Studio: Apple Studios, London
- Length: 3:18
- Label: Apple
- Songwriter: Paul McCartney
- Producer: George Martin

McCartney first played the song to the other Beatles on 9 January 1969. The Beatles did not return to the song until 24 January, recording several takes. (Note: Sulpy and Schweighardt write it was six renditions. Beatles historian Mark Lewisohn writes, "The group recorded three versions – two breakdowns and a complete 5:42 take in which Paul showed the others how to play the song, adding, at the end, '[there's] that one for further consideration.'") This recording includes some instances of guitar feedback. During one rendition of the song, John Lennon is heard calling "do-si-do" and other square-dance steps, something both musicologist Walter Everett and Beatles historian Mark Lewisohn ascribe to Lennon's boredom with the song. Musicologist and writer Ian MacDonald writes that any attempts at recording the song "were sabotaged by Lennon's continuous burble of parody". MacDonald describes "Teddy Boy" as an "annoyingly whimsical ditty – notable solely for its key change from D major to F sharp major".

The Beatles recorded "Teddy Boy" again on 28 and 29 January.

=== December 1969 – February 1970 ===
McCartney recorded the McCartney version of "Teddy Boy" at his home in Cavendish Avenue, St John's Wood. He began the album around Christmas 1969, recording on a recently delivered Studer four-track tape recorder, without a mixing desk, and therefore with no VU displays as a guide for recording levels. McCartney described his home-recording set-up as "Studer, one mike, and nerve". He had finished recording the basic track of "Teddy Boy" by 12 February 1970, when he brought his tapes to Morgan Studios. These tapes were transferred from four- to eight-track tape, adding an audible hiss to the recording. At Morgan Studios, McCartney completed the track by overdubbing drums, a bass drum and clapping.

== Release and reception ==
=== The Beatles ===
The Beatles asked engineer Glyn Johns to mix an LP from their January 1969 recordings. Johns selected take two of "Teddy Boy" from 24 January for his first mix of Get Back. Authors Doug Sulpy and Ray Schweighardt view this selection as "poor judgement" on the engineer's part. Johns mixed the track for stereo on 10 March 1969 at Olympic Sound Studios. Bootleg copies of the mix circulated under titles such as Hot as Sun and Kum Back. In October 1969, Ernie Santosuosso obtained a version of Johns' Get Back and reviewed it for The Boston Globe, writing of "Teddy Boy" that "'Mama, Don’t Worry, Your Teddy Boy’s Here' offers a persistent repetition of theme larded with square dance calls and deft guitar chord changes." As there was no footage of the Beatles playing "Teddy Boy" in the Let It Be film, Johns removed it from his second version of Get Back, replacing it with "Across the Universe" and "I Me Mine". Lewisohn writes that it is also possible that on 4 January 1970 McCartney told Johns that he was about to re-record the song for his solo album.

Due to the Beatles' dissatisfaction with Johns' two attempts, Lennon passed the Get Back tapes on to Phil Spector. Although Johns omitted "Teddy Boy" from the LP, Spector, assisted by engineers Peter Brown and Roger Ferris, made two mixes of the song on 25 March 1970. He kept one at its full length and edited another down from 7:30 to 3:10. (Note: Sulpy and Schweighardt write that Spector's edited version pairs take two from 24 January with another unknown take.) This mix, which Sulpy and Schweighardt describe as a "butchered version", has never been officially released. A later mix included on the 1996 compilation album Anthology 3 comprises three portions of the 28 January take joined to two segments of the 24 January take.

=== McCartney ===
In his album review for the Chicago Tribune, Robb Baker wrote that "'Teddy Boy' exists only as a bad example of the story song genre that McCartney usually does so well." Jared Johnson of The Morning Call said that the Beatles' version as heard on bootlegs had "substance, force and conviction", while "The finished product, though more refined, is shallow and superficial, threatened with fading away into nothingness." According to Santosuosso, the song "tells of filial alienation from a widowed mother who falls in love again. The recurring refrain is the guts of this song."

== Personnel ==
McCartney

Personnel per Howard Sounes:

- Paul McCartney – lead vocals, guitar, bass, drums
- Linda McCartney – backing vocals

Anthology 3

Personnel per Ian MacDonald:

- Paul McCartney – vocal, acoustic guitar
- John Lennon – vocal
- George Harrison – lead guitar
- Ringo Starr – drums
