= Everyday Chemistry =

- Photograph of the cassette casing. The MP3's artwork depicted the cassette itself.

Remix album credited to the Beatles by James Richards
- Released: 9 September 2009
- Genre: Mashup
- Length: 40:53
- Producer: James Richards

Everyday Chemistry is a remix album that was made available as a free digital download on 9 September 2009. The album was released along with a story of anonymous authorship. It mashes up various songs from the Beatles' individual solo careers, including tracks from 27 albums. The album portrays itself as being taken from an alternative universe in which the Beatles had not broken up.

== Context ==
On 9 September 2009, a website with the URL thebeatlesneverbrokeup.com was created. This date coincided with an official Beatles anniversary campaign, including the 2009 remasters box set, an Apple-shaped USB drive containing the remasters, and The Beatles: Rock Band. The website includes a download link to the entire album on MP3.

The website was accompanied by a fictional short story (purporting to be true) written by an anonymous person under the pen name "James Richards" (a pseudonym drawn from the legal first names of Paul McCartney and Ringo Starr, the two surviving Beatles, who were born James Paul McCartney and Richard Starkey respectively).

In the story, Richards describes driving through the Del Puerto Canyon road in California, when he had to pull over to let his dog use the restroom. The dog begins to chase a rabbit, leading to Richards knocking himself unconscious after tripping into a rabbit hole.

He wakes up with a bandage on his head in the home of a man named Jonas. Jonas tells Richards that he found him 20 feet away (despite the location being bare beforehand), and Richards realises he has woken up in a parallel universe. In this universe, ketchup is purple, cassette tapes are more common than the compact disc, and the Beatles never broke up. Jonas shows Richards his tape collection, with most of them being ones he recorded. Some of them are tapes of new Beatles albums, with one of them being Everyday Chemistry.

Jonas and Richards both discuss their enjoyment of the Beatles, and just before leaving the parallel universe and travelling back to his own, Richards steals the tape of Everyday Chemistry, despite being told by Jonas to never take anything from another dimension.

Richards explains why the album sounds like mashups of the Beatles' solo work, stating that "even though in the alternate universe The Beatles hadn't broken up, that didn't mean their future music ideas disappeared".

The website also included photographs of the cassette tape and the location in which Richards claimed to have gone unconscious.

== Album artwork ==
Everyday Chemistry was not given official artwork. Instead, photographs of the cassette tape were used for the cover. The first photograph (which appears on the main page of the website) includes the cassette's case, with the album title & track list being written on ruled paper. The other photograph (which has been used on the MP3 download of the album) is the tape itself, which is a General Electric 60-minute cassette tape. This photograph is unique as it doesn't match with the photographs that appear on the website.

Because of the lack of an official album artwork, fans would take it upon themselves to create their own. The most popular interpretation would include an art piece created in circa 1967 by Michael Leonard of what the Beatles would look like at the age of 64, an art piece inspired from the song "When I'm Sixty Four".

== Critical reception ==
Despite the criticism of Richards' story, Everyday Chemistry has been met with praise for its mixing, production and mashup choices.

== Track listing ==
No.	Title	Length
1.	"Four Guys"	4:17
2.	"Talking to Myself"	3:38
3.	"Anybody Else"	6:03
4.	"Sick to Death"	2:56
5.	"Jenn"	3:34
6.	"I'm Just Sitting Here"	3:23
7.	"Soldier Boy"	3:22
8.	"Over the Ocean"	3:36
9.	"Days Like These"	3:23
10.	"Saturday Night"	3:22
11.	"Mr Gator's Swamp Jamboree"	3:24
Total length:		40:48

=== Samples ===
"Four Guys"

- "I'm Moving On" (John Lennon)
- "Band on the Run" (Paul McCartney)
- "When We Was Fab" (George Harrison)
- "Vertical Man" (Ringo Starr)
- "Beatlemania In Action" (The Beatles' Story)
- "We were four guys ... that's all (Interview Anthology 1)" (The Beatles)

"Talking to Myself"

- "I'm Losing You" (John Lennon)
- "Uncle Albert/Admiral Halsey" (Paul McCartney)
- "Stuck Inside a Cloud" (George Harrison)
- "Early 1970" (Ringo Starr)

"Anybody Else"

- "One Day (At a Time)" (John Lennon)
- "Somedays" (Paul McCartney)
- "Ballad of Sir Frankie Crisp (Let It Roll)" (George Harrison)
- "Monkey See – Monkey Do" (Ringo Starr)

"Sick to Death"

- "Gimme Some Truth" (John Lennon)
- "No More Lonely Nights (playout version)" (Paul McCartney)
- "Between the Devil and the Deep Blue Sea" (George Harrison)
- "All By Myself" (Ringo Starr)

"Jenn"

- "God Save Oz" (John Lennon)
- "Jet" (Paul McCartney)
- "Teardrops" (George Harrison)
- "Hard Times" (Ringo Starr)

"I'm Just Sitting Here"

- "Watching the Wheels" (John Lennon)
- "Call Me Back Again" (Paul McCartney)
- "Give Me Love (Give Me Peace on Earth)" (George Harrison)
- "Loser's Lounge" (Ringo Starr)

"Soldier Boy"

- "Isolation" (John Lennon)
- "Phil and John 1" (John Lennon)
- "Listen to What the Man Said" (Paul McCartney)
- "Woman Don't You Cry For Me" (George Harrison)
- "I Don't Believe You" (Ringo Starr)
- "John Lennon Becomes A DJ For A Day At KHJ Radio 27 September 1974 (and now back to your local station)" (John Lennon)

"Over the Ocean"

- "You Are Here" (John Lennon)
- "Heather" (Paul McCartney)
- "I Dig Love" (George Harrison)
- "Marwa Blues" (George Harrison)
- "Back Off Boogaloo" (Ringo Starr)

"Days Like These"

- "Nobody Told Me" (John Lennon)
- "Write Away" (Paul McCartney)
- "Soft-Hearted Hana" (George Harrison)
- "Christmas Eve" (Ringo Starr)

"Saturday Night"

- "Cold Turkey" (John Lennon)
- "Night Out" (Paul McCartney)
- "P2 Vatican Blues (Last Saturday Night)" (George Harrison)
- "Runaways" (Ringo Starr)

"Mr. Gator's Swamp Jamboree"

- "Sunday Bloody Sunday" (John Lennon)
- "Momma Miss America" (Paul McCartney)
- "Tired of Midnight Blue" (George Harrison)
- "$15 Draw" (Ringo Starr)

== See also ==
- The Black Album
- "The Twelfth Album"
