= Let It Be (1970 film) =

1970 documentary about the Beatles by Michael Lindsay-Hogg

- Theatrical release poster
- Directed by: Michael Lindsay-Hogg
- Produced by: Neil Aspinall
- Starring: The Beatles
- Cinematography: Anthony B. Richmond
- Edited by: Tony Lenny
- Music by: John Lennon; Paul McCartney; George Harrison; Ringo Starr
- Production companies: Apple Films; ABKCO Industries
- Distributed by: United Artists
- Release dates: 13 May 1970 (New York City); 20 May 1970 (United Kingdom)
- Running time: 80 minutes
- Country: United Kingdom
- Language: English

Let It Be is a 1970 British documentary film starring the Beatles and directed by Michael Lindsay-Hogg. The film documents the group's rehearsing and recording songs in January 1969 for what was to become their twelfth and final studio album Let It Be. The film ends with an unannounced rooftop concert by the group, their last public performance together.

The film was originally planned as a television documentary that would accompany a concert broadcast. When plans for the concert were dropped, the project became a feature film production. Although Let It Be does not dwell on the dissension within the Beatles at the time, it provides some glimpses into the dynamics that would lead to their break-up. After the film's release, John Lennon, Paul McCartney, George Harrison and Ringo Starr won an Academy Award for Best Original Song Score. Footage filmed for Let It Be was later restored and re-edited for Peter Jackson's 2021 documentary The Beatles: Get Back.

Let It Be had not been officially available on home video since the 1980s, although bootleg copies of the film still circulated. While attempts to release the film on DVD and Blu-ray have not come to fruition, a restored 4K version of the film was made available to stream on Disney+ for the first time on 8 May 2024.

== Content ==
The film observes the Beatles (John Lennon, Paul McCartney, George Harrison and Ringo Starr) from a "fly on the wall" perspective, without narration, scene titles or interviews with the main subjects. The first portion of the film shows the band rehearsing on a sound stage at Twickenham Film Studios. The songs are works in progress, with discussions among the band members about ways to improve them. McCartney dominates the proceedings while his bandmates show comparatively little interest. Also appearing are Mal Evans, providing the hammer blows on "Maxwell's Silver Hammer", and Yoko Ono at Lennon's side at all times.

At one point, McCartney seems to criticise Harrison's guitar part on "Two of Us" and a mildly tense conversation takes place between them. McCartney says "I always hear myself annoying you" and tells Harrison that this is not his intention. Harrison responds that McCartney no longer annoys him and that he is content to play what McCartney wishes or to not play at all.

The Beatles individually arrive at Apple headquarters, where they begin the studio recording process with Harrison singing "For You Blue" while Lennon plays lap steel guitar. Starr and Harrison work on the structure for "Octopus's Garden" and then demonstrate it for George Martin. Billy Preston accompanies the band on impromptu renditions of several rock and roll covers, as well as Lennon's improvised jam "Dig It", while Linda Eastman's daughter Heather plays around the studio. Lennon listens in silence while McCartney expresses his concern about the band's inclination to stay confined to the recording studio. The Beatles conclude their studio work with complete performances of "Two of Us", "Let It Be" and "The Long and Winding Road".

In the final portion of the film, the Beatles and Preston give an unannounced concert from the studio rooftop. They perform "Get Back", "Don't Let Me Down", "I've Got a Feeling", "One After 909" and "Dig a Pony", intercut with reactions and comments from surprised Londoners gathering on the streets below. The police eventually make their way to the roof and try to bring the show to a close, as it was disrupting businesses' lunch hour nearby. This prompts some ad-libbed lyrical asides from McCartney during the last performance of "Get Back". The concert ends with applause from the people on the rooftop and Lennon quipping, "I'd like to say thank you on behalf of the group and ourselves, and I hope we passed the audition!"

== Production ==
=== Concept ===
After the stressful sessions for The Beatles (also known as the "White Album") wrapped up in October 1968, McCartney concluded that the group needed to return to their roots for their next project. The plan was to give a live performance featuring new songs, broadcast as a television special and recorded for release as an album. Unlike their recent albums, their new material would be designed to work well in concert, without the benefit of overdubs or other recording tricks. Lennon approved of the idea while Harrison, who spent the final months of the year recording in Los Angeles and visiting Bob Dylan and the Band in upstate New York, agreed that the "new approach" to recording had merit.

Many ideas were floated concerning the location of the concert. Conventional venues such as the Roundhouse in London were discussed, but they also considered more unusual locations such as a disused flour mill and an ocean liner. The location that received the most consideration was a Roman amphitheatre in Sabratha, Libya. None of the ideas gained unanimous enthusiasm and with time limited by Starr's upcoming commitment to the film The Magic Christian (1969), it was agreed to start rehearsals without a firm decision on the concert location.

Denis O'Dell, head of Apple's film division, suggested filming the rehearsals in 16 mm for use as a separate "Beatles at Work" television documentary which would supplement the concert broadcast. To facilitate filming, rehearsals would take place at Twickenham Film Studios in London. Michael Lindsay-Hogg was hired as the director, having previously worked with the Beatles on promotional films for "Paperback Writer", "Rain", "Hey Jude" and "Revolution".

=== Filming ===
The Beatles assembled at Twickenham Film Studios on 2 January 1969, accompanied by the film crew, and began rehearsing. Cameraman Les Parrott recalled: "My brief on the first day was to 'shoot The Beatles.' The sound crew instructions were to roll/record from the moment the first Beatle appeared and to record sound all day until the last one left. We had two cameras and just about did the same thing." The cold and austere conditions at Twickenham, along with nearly constant filming and sessions starting much earlier than the Beatles' preferred schedule, constrained creativity and exacerbated tensions within the group. The sessions were later described by Harrison as "the low of all-time" and by Lennon as "hell ... the most miserable sessions on earth".

The infamous exchange between McCartney and Harrison (in which Harrison resented McCartney instructing him on what to play) occurred on Monday, 6 January. Around lunchtime on Friday, 10 January, tensions came to a head and Harrison told the others that he was leaving the band. This entire episode is omitted from the film. He later recalled: "I thought, 'I'm quite capable of being happy on my own, and if I'm not able to be happy in this situation I'm getting out of here.' So I got my guitar and went home and that afternoon wrote 'Wah-Wah'." Rehearsals and filming continued for a few more sessions; the finished film only used a boogie-woogie piano duet by McCartney and Starr, although it was included in such a way that Harrison's absence was not apparent. Towards the end of the 10 January rehearsal, Lennon raised the idea of drafting in Eric Clapton to play lead guitar if Harrison did not rejoin the band early the following week. Lennon was captured on tape saying, "I think if George doesn't come back by Monday or Tuesday, we ask Eric Clapton to play", adding that this would be congenial to Clapton since the Beatles, unlike Clapton's previous band Cream, "would give him full scope to play his guitar". Years later, Clapton dismissed this idea: "The problem with that was I had bonded or was developing a relationship with George, exclusive of them. I think it fitted a need of his and mine, that he could elevate himself by having this guy that could be like a gunslinger to them. Lennon would use my name every now and then for clout, as if I was the fastest gun. So, I don't think I could have been brought into the whole thing because I was too much a mate of George's."

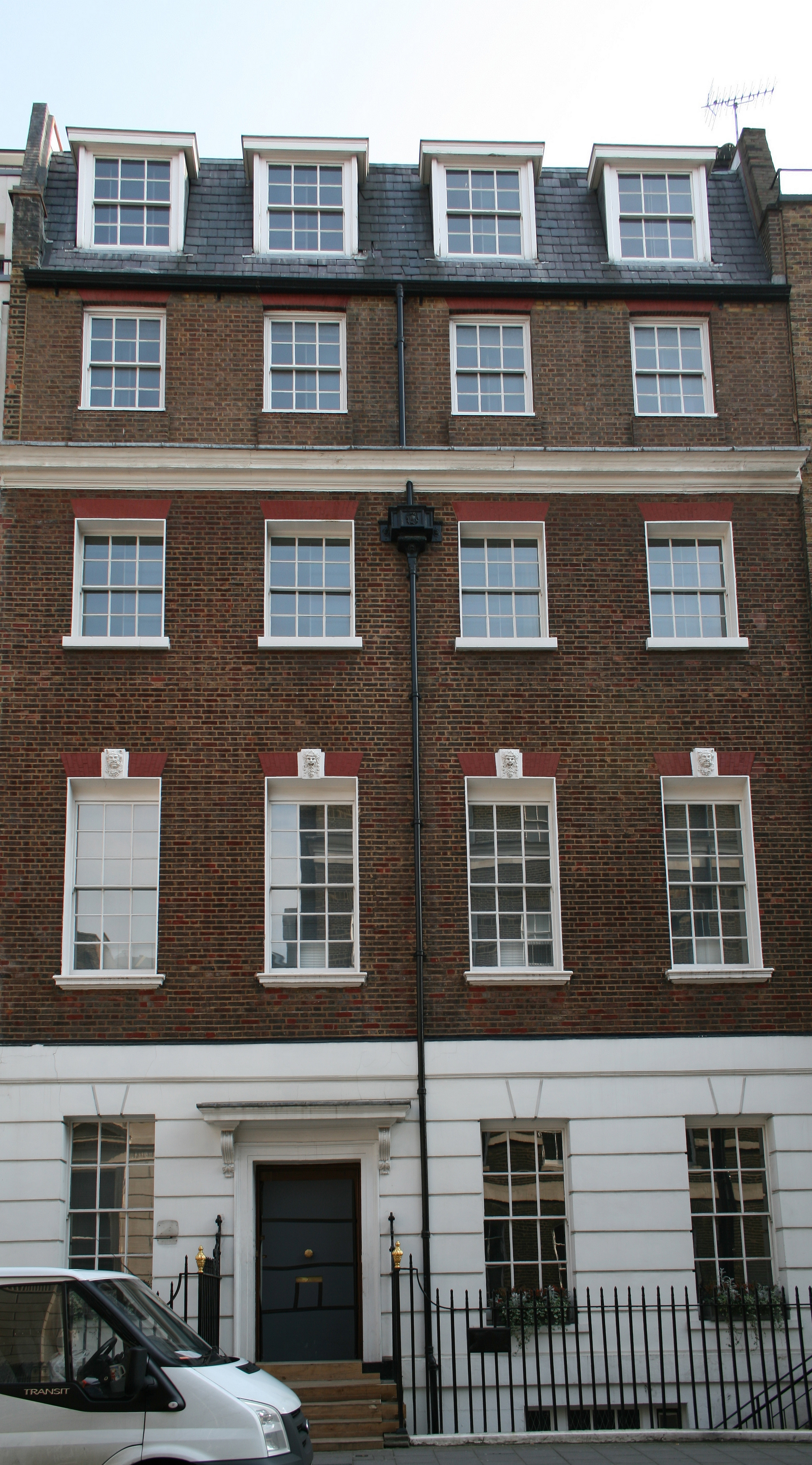
Former Apple Building, 3 Savile Row, 2007

At a meeting on 15 January, Harrison agreed to return with the conditions that elaborate concert plans be dropped and that work would resume at Apple's new recording studio. At this point, with the concert broadcast idea abandoned, it was decided that the footage being shot would be used to make a feature film. Filming resumed on 21 January at the basement studio inside Apple headquarters on Savile Row in London. Harrison invited keyboardist Billy Preston to the studio to play electric piano and organ. Harrison recalled that when Preston joined them, "straight away there was 100% improvement in the vibe in the room. Having this fifth person was just enough to cut the ice that we'd created among ourselves." Filming continued each day for the rest of January.

During the sessions, the Beatles played many songs that were not featured in the film. Some would end up on Abbey Road ("I Want You (She's So Heavy)", "She Came in Through the Bathroom Window"); others were destined for future albums by McCartney ("The Back Seat of My Car", "Teddy Boy", "Every Night"), Lennon ("Gimme Some Truth", "Child of Nature" – later reworked as "Jealous Guy") and Harrison ("All Things Must Pass", "Isn't It a Pity"). The group also experimented with some of their previous songs ("Love Me Do", "Help!", "Lady Madonna", "You Can't Do That") and played "I Lost My Little Girl" – which was the first song written by McCartney, when he was 14.

Trying to come up with a conclusion for the film, it was suggested that the band play an unannounced lunchtime concert on the roof of the Apple building. On 30 January, the Beatles and Preston played on the rooftop in the cold wind for 42 minutes, about half of which ended up in the film. The Beatles started with a rehearsal of "Get Back", then played the five songs which are shown in the film. After repeating "I've Got a Feeling" and "Don't Let Me Down", takes which were left out of the film, the Beatles are shown in the film closing with another pass at "Get Back" as the police arrive to shut down the show. On 31 January, the last day of filming and recording, the Beatles reconvened in the Apple building's basement studio. They played complete performances of "Two of Us", "The Long and Winding Road" and "Let It Be", which were included in the film as the end of the Apple studio segment, before the closing rooftop segment.

=== Post-production ===
A rough cut of the movie was screened for the Beatles on 20 July 1969. Lindsay-Hogg recalled that the rough cut was about an hour longer than the released version: "There was much more stuff of John and Yoko, and the other three didn't really think that was appropriate because they wanted to make it a 'nicer' movie. They didn't want to have a lot of the dirty laundry, so a lot of it was cut down." After viewing the released version, Lennon said he felt that "the camera work was set up to show Paul and not to show anybody else" and that "the people that cut it, cut it as 'Paul is God' and we're just lyin' around". He described Let It Be as a film "set up by Paul for Paul" that was typical of the projects that, in alienating himself and Harrison, had brought about the Beatles' break-up.

Lindsay-Hogg omitted any reference to Harrison leaving the sessions and temporarily quitting the group, but managed to keep some of the interpersonal strains in the final cut, including the McCartney–Harrison exchange which he had captured by deliberately placing the cameras where they would not be noticed. He also retained the scene that he described as "the back of Paul's head as he's yammering on and John looks like he's about to die from boredom".

In early 1970, it was decided to change the planned name of the film and the associated album from Get Back to Let It Be, matching the group's March 1970 single release. The final version of the film was blown-up from full-frame (1.33:1) aspect ratio 16 mm to 35mm film 1.85:1 aspect ratio for theatrical release, which increased the film's graininess. To create the wider theatrical aspect ratio, the top and bottom of the frame was cropped, necessitating the repositioning of every single shot for optimal picture composition.

== Soundtrack ==
While the album Let It Be contains many of the songs featured in the film, in most cases they are different performances. The film has additional songs not included on the album.

Songs listed in the order of appearance, written by Lennon–McCartney except as noted:

- "Paul's Piano Intro"
  - based on "Adagio for Strings" (Samuel Barber), and titled "Paul's Piano Piece" on Let It Be... Naked
- "Don't Let Me Down"
- "Maxwell's Silver Hammer"
- "Two of Us"
- "I've Got a Feeling"
- "Oh! Darling"
- "Just Fun"
- "One After 909"
- "Jazz Piano Song" (McCartney/Starkey)
- "Across the Universe"
- "Dig a Pony"
- "Suzy Parker" (Lennon/McCartney/Harrison/Starkey)
- "I Me Mine" (Harrison)
- "For You Blue" (Harrison)
- "Bésame Mucho" (Consuelo Velázquez/Sunny Skylar)
- "Octopus's Garden" (Starkey)
- "You've Really Got a Hold on Me" (Smokey Robinson)
- "The Long and Winding Road"
- Medley:
  - "Rip It Up" (Robert Blackwell/John Marascalco)
  - "Shake, Rattle and Roll" (Jesse Stone, under his working name Charles E. Calhoun)
- Medley:
  - "Kansas City" (Jerry Leiber/Mike Stoller)
  - "Miss Ann" (Richard Penniman/Enotris Johnson)
  - "Lawdy Miss Clawdy" (Lloyd Price)
- "Dig It"
- "Let It Be"
- "Get Back"

== Release ==
The world premiere of the film was in New York City on 13 May 1970. One week later, UK premieres were held at the Liverpool Gaumont Cinema and the London Pavilion. Though none of the Beatles attended any of the premieres, Lennon's ex-wife Cynthia did so, where she was accompanied by Jane Asher, McCartney's ex-girlfriend. The Beatles won an Oscar for Let It Be in the category "Original Song Score", which Quincy Jones accepted on their behalf. The soundtrack also won a Grammy for "Best Original Score". Only Lennon, McCartney and Harrison were named as recipients by the Recording Academy due to the belief that they were the sole composers. They mistakenly overlooked Starr's writing credit on the song "Dig It".

== Critical reception ==
=== Contemporaneous reviews ===
Initial reviews were generally unfavourable. Critics took issue with the film's technical and conceptual qualities, but in light of the Beatles' recent break-up, focused particularly on it as a document of the fractured relationships within the band. The British press were especially critical, with The Sunday Telegraph commenting that "it is only incidentally that we glimpse anything about their real characters – the way in which music now seems to be the only unifying force holding them together, and the way Paul McCartney chatters incessantly even when, it seems, none of the others are listening." The same reviewer lamented that "Watching an institution such as the Beatles in their film Let It Be is rather like watching the Albert Hall being dismantled into a block of National Coal Board offices", while Penelope Gilliatt of The New Yorker deemed it "a very bad film and a touching one ... about the breaking apart of this reassuring, geometrically perfect, once apparently ageless family of siblings". Time said that "rock scholars and Beatles fans will be enthralled" while others may consider it only a "mildly enjoyable documentary newsreel".

=== Retrospective reviews ===
Review aggregator website Rotten Tomatoes reports that 81% of 54 critics' reviews are positive, with an average rating of 7.3/10. The consensus reads, "So close and yet so far away from The Beatles as their union sunsets in real time, Let It Be observes the band from an emotionally chilly distance but gives audiences a valuable peek into their artistic process." On Metacritic, the film has a weighted average score of 72 out of 100, based on 13 critics, indicating "generally favorable" reviews.

Leonard Maltin rated the film as 3 out of 4 stars, calling it "uneven" and "draggy" but "rescued" by the Beatles' music. The TLA Video & DVD Guide, also rating it as 3 out of 4 stars, described the film as a "fascinating look at the final days of the world's most famous rock group, punctuated by the Beatles' great songs and the legendary 'rooftop' concert sequence. ... It is important viewing for all music fans." Owen Gleiberman of Variety considers the film to be "extraordinary", stating that "It was grainy and moody and desultory ... It contained moments that, after multiple viewings [...] are lodged in my soul." He adds that though it has not been given a release on home media in recent years, "[Let It Be] has a place in film history; it's a scraggly elegy, capturing a certain wistful moment of reckoning that's part of the Beatles' story."

Lindsay-Hogg told Entertainment Weekly in 2003 that reception to Let It Be within the Beatles camp was "mixed". He believed McCartney and Lennon both liked the film, while Harrison disliked it because "it represented a time in his life when he was unhappy ... It was a time when he very much was trying to get out from under the thumb of Lennon–McCartney." According to Jann Wenner, Lennon cried watching the film in a theatre. In 2007, McCartney stated that he could not bear to watch the film.

== Home media ==
=== Original 1980s home media releases ===
The film was first released on VHS, Betamax and LaserDisc in 1981 by Magnetic Video and on RCA CED videodisc in 1982. The transfer to video was not considered high quality; in particular, the already-cropped theatrical version was again cropped to a 4:3 aspect ratio for television. The lack of availability has prompted considerable bootlegging of the film, first on VHS and later on DVD, derived from copies of the early 1980s releases. The film was also released on VHS and Betamax in Germany and the Netherlands in the 1980s. These versions were not the same transfer as the US release, as they were based on the native 4:3 aspect ratio from the original 16mm negative, thus presenting the film as less cropped than the US releases.

=== Anthology excerpts and cancelled Let It Be... Naked re-release ===
The Let It Be movie was remastered from the original 16 mm film negative by Apple Corps in 1992, with some footage seen in the 1995 documentary The Beatles Anthology. After additional remastering, a DVD release containing additional footage (tentatively titled Let It A, B, C) was planned to accompany the 2003 release of Let It Be... Naked, including a second DVD of bonus material, but it never materialised. The remaster was done by Ron Furmanek, except he cropped the image below, and despite not having an official release, this remaster was leaked and became another bootleg edition. In February 2007, Apple Corps' Neil Aspinall said, "The film was so controversial when it first came out. When we got halfway through restoring it, we looked at the outtakes and realised: this stuff is still controversial. It raised a lot of old issues." During the 2000s the fan-restored DVD known as The Get Back Chronicles was released through many Beatles-fan sites, being a bootleg recording. It featured extended scenes pulled from leaks obtained on the Internet as well as several excerpts from Anthology.

=== Further re-release attempts ===
An anonymous industry source told the Daily Express in July 2008 that, according to Apple insiders, McCartney and Starr blocked the release of the film on DVD. The two were concerned about the effect on the band's "global brand ... if the public sees the darker side of the story. Neither Paul nor Ringo would feel comfortable publicising a film showing the Beatles getting on each other's nerves ... There's all sorts of extra footage showing more squabbles but it's questionable if the film will ever see a reissue during Paul and Ringo's lifetime."

However, in 2016, McCartney stated he was not opposed to an official re-release, saying, "I keep bringing it up, and everyone goes, 'Yeah, we should do that.' The objection should be me. I don't come off well."

=== The Beatles: Get Back ===
2024 restored version poster

In September 2018, McCartney stated that Let It Be would most likely be re-released on Blu-ray and DVD in 2020 to coincide with its fiftieth anniversary, and that the creation of a "new version" of the film featuring sequences not present in the theatrical release was being considered by Apple.

It was announced on 30 January 2019, the fiftieth anniversary of the Beatles' rooftop concert, that the new film, built around "55 hours of never-before-seen footage and 140 hours of audio" from the original 1969 sessions, was to be directed by Peter Jackson using the same restoration techniques as his acclaimed World War I documentary They Shall Not Grow Old. The intention of the documentary was to provide a new level of insight into the band's dynamics during the album's creation, and was made with the cooperation of McCartney, Starr, Yoko Ono and Olivia Harrison. Clare Olssen and Jabez Olssen, the producer and editor of They Shall Not Grow Old, reprised their roles for the film, while Ken Kamins, Jeff Jones and Jonathan Clyde acted as executive producers.

Jackson's film was to be followed by a remastered re-release of Lindsay-Hogg's original film. The new documentary was officially announced in March 2020 with the title The Beatles: Get Back and a theatrical release date was originally set by distributor Walt Disney Studios Motion Pictures for 4 September 2020, but was then rescheduled to 27 August 2021 due to restrictions imposed in response to the COVID-19 pandemic. The theatrical release was subsequently repurposed for the documentary premiering on Disney+, which it did as a three-part miniseries on 25, 26 and 27 November 2021. Lindsay-Hogg qualified the differences between the two projects in 2023, by describing his version as a "great short story" and Jackson's as a "great novel".

=== 2024 re-release ===
On 16 April 2024, it was announced that Let It Be had been restored by Peter Jackson's Park Road Post and would be made available in 4K on the streaming service Disney+, marking the first time it had been officially released since 1982. Jackson said about the film version: "Let It Be is the climax of Get Back, while Get Back provides a vital missing context for Let It Be". It was released on 8 May 2024.

== Bibliography ==
- The Beatles (2000). The Beatles Anthology. Chronicle Books. ISBN 0-8118-2684-8.
- Lewisohn, Mark (2000) [1992]. The Complete Beatles Chronicle. Hamlyn. ISBN 0-600-60033-5.
- Matteo, Stephen (2004). Let It Be. 33⅓ series. Continuum International. ISBN 0-8264-1634-9.
- Sulpy, Doug; Schweighardt, Ray (1999). Get Back: The Unauthorized Chronicle of the Beatles' 'Let It Be' Disaster. Macmillan. ISBN 0-312-19981-3.
- Unterberger, Richie (2006). The Unreleased Beatles: Music & Film. Backbeat Books. ISBN 0-87930-892-3.
- Rathjen, Friedhelm (2018). Get Back. Die Beatles in Twickenham, 2.–14. Januar 1969 (in German). Edition ReJoyce. ISBN 978-3-947261-08-6.
- Rathjen, Friedhelm (2019). Let It Be. Die Beatles im Apple-Studio, 21.–31. Januar 1969 (in German). Edition ReJoyce. ISBN 978-3-947261-09-3.
