= The Lovely Linda =

Song by Paul McCartney

from the album McCartney
- Published: Northern Songs (UK)/Maclen Music (US)
- Released: 17 April 1970
- Recorded: December 1969
- Studio: McCartney's home, London
- Genre: Folk rock
- Length: 0:42
- Label: Apple
- Songwriter: Paul McCartney
- Producer: Paul McCartney

McCartney track listing
- 13 tracks Side one: 1. "The Lovely Linda"; 2. "That Would Be Something"; 3. "Valentine Day"; 4. "Every Night"; 5. "Hot as Sun/Glasses"; 6. "Junk"; 7. "Man We Was Lonely"; Side two: 8. "Oo You"; 9. "Momma Miss America"; 10. "Teddy Boy"; 11. "Singalong Junk"; 12. "Maybe I'm Amazed"; 13. "Kreen-Akrore"

"The Lovely Linda" is a song by English musician Paul McCartney, released as the opening track of his debut solo album, McCartney, in April 1970. McCartney wrote the song to his first wife, Linda McCartney.

== History ==
Paul McCartney wrote "The Lovely Linda" in Scotland during 1969, when he and wife Linda McCartney were living at their farm, High Park, in Campbeltown. The song is dedicated to McCartney's first wife and was a reply-of-sorts to Beatles bandmate John Lennon's public declarations of love for his wife, Yoko Ono. "The Lovely Linda" was released as the opening track on McCartney's eponymous debut solo album, and was the first song taped for the album. McCartney recorded the composition shortly before Christmas in December 1969, in order to test his then-new 4-track recorder, which he had installed in his home studio in London.

At 42 seconds, it is the shortest song in McCartney's solo catalogue. The recording features him on all instruments, including what authors Chip Madinger and Mark Easter term "percussive handslaps on a book", and ends with the sound of laughter. On release in April 1970, McCartney stated that "The Lovely Linda" was a "trailer to the full song which will be recorded in the future", but he has yet to release a more complete version. The song appeared on the 2001 compilation Wingspan: Hits and History.

== Reception ==
In a review for the McCartney album, Langdon Winner of Rolling Stone described "The Lovely Linda", along with "That Would Be Something", as having "virtually no verbal or melodic content whatsoever."

George Harrison disregarded the song during an interview in 1970, stating: "'That Would Be Something' and 'Maybe I'm Amazed' I think are great and everything else I think is fair, you know. It's quite good, but a little disappointing, but maybe I shouldn't be disappointed, it's best not to expect anything, then everything's a bonus. I think those two tracks are very good and the others just don't do anything for me."

== Personnel ==
- Paul McCartney – lead vocals, guitar, bass, hand percussion

Personnel per The Beatles Bible.

== Sources ==
- Blake, John (1981). All You Needed Was Love: The Beatles After the Beatles. Middlesex: Hamlyn Paperbacks. ISBN 0-600-20466-9.
- Castleman, Harry; Podrazik, Walter J. (1976). All Together Now: The First Complete Beatles Discography 1961–1975. New York, NY: Ballantine Books. ISBN 0-345-25680-8.
- Madinger, Chip; Easter, Mark (2000). Eight Arms to Hold You: The Solo Beatles Compendium. Chesterfield, MO: 44.1 Productions. ISBN 0-615-11724-4.
- Sounes, Howard (2010). Fab: An Intimate Life of Paul McCartney. London: HarperCollins. ISBN 978-0-00-723705-0.
- Spizer, Bruce (2005). The Beatles Solo on Apple Records. New Orleans, LA: 498 Productions. ISBN 0-9662649-5-9.
