= That Would Be Something =

Song by Paul McCartney

from the album McCartney
- Released: 17 April 1970
- Recorded: December 1969
- Studio: McCartney's home, London
- Genre: Folk-pop, blues
- Length: 2:43
- Label: Apple
- Songwriter: Paul McCartney
- Producer: Paul McCartney

McCartney track listing
- 13 tracks Side one: 1. "The Lovely Linda"; 2. "That Would Be Something"; 3. "Valentine Day"; 4. "Every Night"; 5. "Hot as Sun/Glasses"; 6. "Junk"; 7. "Man We Was Lonely"; Side two: 8. "Oo You"; 9. "Momma Miss America"; 10. "Teddy Boy"; 11. "Singalong Junk"; 12. "Maybe I'm Amazed"; 13. "Kreen-Akrore"

"That Would Be Something" is a song written by Paul McCartney which was first released on his McCartney album on 17 April 1970.

== Recording ==
McCartney sings and plays acoustic guitar, bass, electric guitar, tom tom and a cymbal. This song and "Valentine Day" were mixed at Abbey Road Studios on 22 February 1970. McCartney would also record "Every Night" and "Maybe I'm Amazed" the same day. In the song McCartney also performs vocal percussion to simulate a drum kit.

== Release and reception ==
Shortly after the McCartney album's release, George Harrison described this song and "Maybe I'm Amazed" as "great". Stephen Thomas Erlewine of AllMusic said the song was "light folk-pop".

In a review for the McCartney album, Langdon Winner of Rolling Stone described "That Would Be Something", along with "The Lovely Linda", as having "virtually no verbal or melodic content whatsoever."

"That Would Be Something" was also released on the 1991 album Unplugged (The Official Bootleg). The song was first performed live by McCartney, in Barcelona, on 8 May 1991.

== Personnel ==
- Paul McCartney – vocals, guitar, bass guitar, tom tom, cymbal, vocal percussion

== Cover versions ==
The Grateful Dead played this song in concert 16 times between 1991 and 1995. The first time they played the song live is available on Dick's Picks Volume 17.

In 2010, Jack White interpolated a bridge of "That Would Be Something" into his performance of "Mother Nature's Son", another one of McCartney's compositions, during a concert held at the White House during which McCartney was awarded the Gershwin Prize.
