= When I'm Sixty-Four =

- Cover of the US sheet music for the song

Song by the Beatles

from the album Sgt. Pepper's Lonely Hearts Club Band
- Released: 26 May 1967
- Recorded: 6–21 December 1966
- Studio: EMI, London
- Genre: Pop; music hall; vaudeville
- Length: 2:37
- Label: Parlophone
- Songwriter: Lennon–McCartney
- Producer: George Martin

"When I'm Sixty-Four" is a song by the English rock band the Beatles, written by Paul McCartney (credited to Lennon–McCartney) and released on the 1967 album Sgt. Pepper's Lonely Hearts Club Band. It was one of the first songs McCartney wrote; he was about 14, probably in April or May 1956. The song was recorded in a different key from the final version; it was sped up at McCartney's request to make his voice sound younger. It prominently features a trio of clarinets (two B♭ clarinets and one bass clarinet).

== Composition ==
Paul McCartney wrote the melody to "When I'm Sixty-Four" when he was about 14, probably at 20 Forthlin Road in April or May 1956. In 1987, McCartney recalled, "Rock and roll was about to happen that year, it was about to break, [so] I was still a little bit cabaret minded", and in 1974, "I wrote a lot of stuff thinking I was going to end up in the cabaret, not realising that rock and roll was particularly going to happen. When I was fourteen there wasn't much of a clue that it was going to happen."

The song is sung by a young man to his lover, and is about his plans of their growing old together. Although the theme is ageing, it was one of the first songs McCartney wrote. Beatles historian Mark Lewisohn suggests it was McCartney's second composition, after "Call It Suicide" but before "I Lost My Little Girl". It was in the Beatles' setlist in their early days as a song to perform when their amplifiers broke down or the electricity went off. Lewisohn and George Martin speculated that McCartney may have thought of the song when recording began for Sgt. Pepper's Lonely Hearts Club Band in December 1966 because his father, Jim McCartney, had turned 64 earlier that year.

In 1967, John Lennon said of the song, "Paul wrote it in the Cavern days. We just stuck a few more words on it like 'grandchildren on your knee' and 'Vera, Chuck and Dave' … this was just one that was quite a hit with us." In 1972, Lennon said, "I think I helped Paul with some of the words, like 'Vera, Chuck and Dave' and 'Doing the garden, digging the weeds'". Lennon's contribution of the children's names were likely made in the studio. McCartney's manuscript for the song sold for $55,700 (equivalent to US$121,000 in 2025) at Sotheby's, London in September 1994.

The song uses applied dominants more than the rest of Sgt. Pepper, in the refrain (B–2–3), in a tonicization of VI in the bridge (B) and, as musicologist Walter Everett puts it, in "the wide array of jaunty chromatic neighbors and passing tones comparable to those in McCartney's dad's 'Walking in the Park with Eloise'".

=== Instrumentation ===
A clarinet trio (two B♭ clarinets and a bass clarinet) features prominently in the song. Martin said they were added at McCartney's request to "get around the lurking schmaltz factor" by using them "in a classical way". One clarinet provides an alto countermelody in the third verse. The bass clarinet doubles the line played by McCartney's bass guitar for the retransitional arpeggiation of V^{7} at C–1–2. During the chorus, the clarinets add texture by playing legato quarter notes while the bass clarinet plays staccato quarter notes. In the song's final verse, the clarinet is played in descant with McCartney's vocal. Supporting instruments include piano, bass, drum set, tubular bells and electric guitar.

== Recording ==
The Beatles recorded two takes of the song on 6 December 1966, during one of the first sessions for the as-yet-unnamed album that became Sgt. Pepper's Lonely Hearts Club Band. Martin produced, supported by engineers Geoff Emerick and Phil McDonald. McCartney overdubbed his lead vocal onto take two without the other Beatles present on 8 December. On 20 December, McCartney, Lennon and George Harrison overdubbed backing vocals and Ringo Starr added the sound of bells.

Martin made two reduction mixes (takes three and four) with the latter best. On 21 December, session musicians Robert Burns, Henry MacKenzie and Frank Reidy overdubbed two clarinets and a bass clarinet onto take four. Emerick later said, "The clarinets on that track became a very personal sound for me; I recorded them so far forward that they became one of the main focal points." Martin recalled, "I remember recording it in the cavernous Number One studio at Abbey Road and thinking how the three clarinet players looked as lost as a referee and two linesmen alone in the middle of Wembley Stadium." On the same day, Martin remixed the song for mono three times, although this was only a demo version. (Note: An acetate of this demo sold at auction in September 1992.) He made four new mono mixes on 29 December.

On 30 December, unsatisfied by all of these attempts, McCartney suggested speeding up the track to raise it by around a semitone from its original key of C major to D♭ major. Martin remembered that McCartney suggested this change to make his voice sound younger. McCartney said, "I wanted to appear younger, but that was just to make it more rooty-tooty; just lift the key because it was starting to sound turgid." Martin, Emerick and Richard Lush made the sped-up remix from take four on 17 April 1967. Musicologist Michael Hannan said of the completed track: "The rich timbres of the clarinets give the mix a fuller, fatter sound than many of the other tracks on the album."

== Release ==
The song was nearly released on a single as the B-side of either "Strawberry Fields Forever" or "Penny Lane". It was instead held over to be included as an album track. Everett said the protagonist of "When I'm Sixty-Four" is sometimes associated with the Lonely Hearts Club Band concept, but that he believes the song is thematically unconnected to the rest of the album.

According to author George Case, contemporary listeners perceived all the songs on Sgt. Pepper as drug-inspired, with 1967 marking the pinnacle of LSD's influence on pop music. Some fans viewed the lyric "digging the weeds" from "When I'm Sixty-Four" as a possible drug allusion. In August 1967, The Beatles Book published an article discussing whether the album was "too advanced for the average pop fan". One reader complained that all the songs except "Sgt. Pepper" and "When I'm Sixty-Four" were "over our heads", adding, "The Beatles ought to stop being so clever and give us tunes we can enjoy."

"When I'm Sixty-Four" was included in the Beatles' 1968 animated film Yellow Submarine. It was also used over the opening credits of the 1982 film The World According to Garp.

Giles Martin remixed the song for inclusion on the album's 50th anniversary release in 2017. He mixed it from the original tapes rather than their subsequent mixdowns. Take 2 of the song was included as a bonus track on the deluxe edition. (Note: On take 2, the song is still at its original speed and includes only McCartney on vocal, piano and bass and Starr on drums.)

== Critical reception ==
Reviewing Sgt. Pepper for The New Yorker, Lillian Ross described "When I'm Sixty-Four" as a charming and tasteful parody, "but, like the best parody, it is written with affection, and it has an excellence in its own right, independent of its value as parody." Peter Clayton of Gramophone magazine called the song a pastiche of George Formby (for example, "When I'm Cleaning Windows"), but added it has "a kind of gentle affectionateness about it – and a certain meaty substance – which raise it well above mere kidding". In his review of the album for The Times, William Mann calls the song a vaudeville number, "which comments pointedly on this old-time vogue and its relevance for modern beat song."

In Richard Goldstein's scathing review of the album for The New York Times, he said that the song is not mocking in tone, but complained that "an honest vision is ruined by the background which seeks to enhance it."

In his book Revolution in the Head, Ian MacDonald describes the song as "aimed chiefly at parents, and as a result got a cool reception from the group's own generation". He adds that the song borrows heavily from Formby's English music hall style while invoking the illustrator Donald McGill's seaside postcards. Allan Moore views it as a synthesis of ragtime and pop, adding that its position following Harrison's "Within You Without You" – a blend of Indian classical music and pop – demonstrates the diversity of the album's material. He says the music hall atmosphere is reinforced by McCartney's vocal delivery and the recording's use of chromaticism, a harmonic pattern that can be traced to Scott Joplin's "The Ragtime Dance" and Johann Strauss's The Blue Danube. He says the complementary nature of young and old found in the song influenced the composition of Oasis's 1995 song "She's Electric".

Tim Riley writes that "When I'm Sixty-Four" represents "the McCartney side of Elvis's corny hokum". Walter Everett agrees with Riley's description, adding, "this penchant for the audience-charming vaudeville sketch led to McCartney preferences that Lennon detested the most." BBC Music critic Chris Jones calls the song "pure nostalgia for his parents' golden age" and cites it as an example of Sgt. Pepper being "less a kicking out of the jams, more a spreading them on scones at teatime".

== Personnel ==
According to MacDonald and Lewisohn:

The Beatles

- Paul McCartney – lead vocals, piano, bass
- John Lennon – backing vocals, guitar
- George Harrison – backing vocals, guitar
- Ringo Starr – drums, chimes

Additional musicians

- Robert Burns – clarinet
- Henry MacKenzie – clarinet
- Frank Reidy – bass clarinet

== Legacy ==
On the occasion of McCartney's 64th birthday in June 2006, a month after the singer's separation from his wife Heather Mills, Paul Vallely of The Independent wrote an appreciation that focused on the song's message. Describing McCartney's birthday as "a cultural milestone for a generation", Vallely said the widespread support for McCartney and corresponding derision of Mills "tells us more about us than it does about her". To mark the occasion, McCartney's grandchildren recorded a new version of "When I'm Sixty-Four" for him at Abbey Road. In The New York Times, Sam Roberts likened McCartney's failure to fulfil the song's promise of retirement-age contentment with Mills to America's divorce rates and other socioeconomic problems afflicting citizens in their sixties.

== Certification ==
Region	Certification	Certified units/sales
United Kingdom (BPI)	Silver	200,000^{‡}
^{‡} Sales+streaming figures based on certification alone.
