= I Lost My Little Girl =

Song by Paul McCartney

from the album Unplugged (The Official Bootleg)
- Released: May 20, 1991
- Recorded: January 25, 1991
- Genre: Rock
- Length: 1:45
- Label: Parlophone/EMI
- Songwriter(s): Paul McCartney
- Producer(s): Paul McCartney

Audio sample
- "I Lost My Little Girl": file; help

"I Lost My Little Girl" is one of the first songs written by Paul McCartney and the first he wrote for guitar. McCartney wrote the song in 1956 or 1957, around the age of 14 or 15, shortly after his mother's death.

== Composition ==
Some writers, including musicologist Walter Everett, describe the song as McCartney's first composition. McCartney himself has also described it as "the first song I ever wrote". Beatles historian Mark Lewisohn clarifies,

As it was written on the guitar, which he only began playing after rock's breakthrough, and as he always said he wrote the two piano songs ("Call It Suicide" and what would become "When I'm Sixty-Four") before rock arrived, "I Lost My Little Girl" was not his first song but his first guitar song—a distinction he, as the creator, was entitled to make.

McCartney wrote "I Lost My Little Girl" in 1956 or 1957. In his official biography, Paul McCartney: Many Years from Now, McCartney says he wrote the song "when I was fourteen just after I'd lost my mother". In The Beatles: The Biography, Bob Spitz writes McCartney wrote the song in 1956 soon after his mother Mary's death on 29 October 1956 and that, "McCartney remains vague about a correlation between the two events." Writer and research fellow Dave Laing writes McCartney wrote the song sometime between his mother's death and the summer of 1957. Lewisohn writes McCartney wrote the song in late 1957, around the time John Lennon wrote “Hello Little Girl”. In particular, Lewisohn notes that when McCartney sings the song he includes "a [Buddy] Holly hiccup, pinpointing its creation to post-September 1957," the month McCartney and Lennon first heard the Crickets' song "That'll Be the Day". Everett agrees with Lewisohn that the Holly-like vocalizations in lines 8–10 of the song likely post-date McCartney's first hearing Holly in late 1957, but contends that those were later additions and that he had already written the rest of the song before that point.

McCartney wrote the song with his first guitar, a Framus Zenith acoustic guitar. In The Beatles Anthology, McCartney recalls, "All my first songs, including that one, were written on the Zenith; songs like 'Michelle' and 'I Saw Her Standing There'. It was on this guitar that I learnt 'Twenty Flight Rock', the song that later got me into the group The Quarry Men." It is unclear whether he wrote the words or the melody first, though there is likely nothing beyond a few verses. In a 1976 interview, McCartney describes it as "A funny little song, a nice little song, a corny little song, based on three chords—G, G^{7} and C." In a 1991 performance, he clarifies, "I'm gonna play a song which was the first song I ever wrote, when I was fourteen... You see, you take a G [nut-position chord] and you take a G^{7} and a C, that's all it is really; a bit of F, I must admit."

Lewisohn writes the influence of Buddy Holly in the songs composition is "crystal clear", being "steeped in the Crickets' sound". Everett writes that the song did not originally have a contrasting section with the B-section added later. He also writes that the song is representative of most of the Beatles' earliest compositions in being "thoroughly diatonic, grounded solidly in the major scale". In interviews, McCartney often expresses embarrassment over his rhyming "girl" with "her hair didn't always curl." Lewisohn writes that the strength of the song instead lies in its melodic counterpoint, indicating McCartney's early skills. In The Beatles Anthology, McCartney says, "I liked the way one melody line went down and the other went up, which I think is called contrary motion. It was a very innocent little song."

After writing the song, McCartney often played it for other people. In a 1989 interview, he recalled, "I liked the idea of being able to say 'I wrote this'". Ian James, a classmate of McCartney's, recalled an early demonstration:

I was in Forthlin Road once when Paul said, "I've written this song." I couldn't imagine what it would be like but we went up to his bedroom and while I stood there he sat on the edge of his bed and played me "I Lost My Little Girl." Whether it was a good tune or not, I was impressed by the fact that he'd written something. I'd never thought about writing a song—I was only interested in playing what had been recorded. He didn't only want to strum to Elvis Presley or Jerry Lee Lewis, he was more interested in creating something himself. That spark was there from the start.

== Recording ==
In the early 1970s rumours circulated about the existence of an early 1962 rehearsal of the Beatles performing "I Lost My Little Girl", amongst several other songs. Everett writes that these rumours have never been substantiated. The earliest known taping of the song is the Beatles performing a version in January 1969 during their Get Back sessions. (Note: This recording is on the 1991 bootleg, Get Back and 22 Other Songs.) John Lennon is on lead vocal while McCartney supplies a repeated sustained upper descant. McCartney recorded another early version on a crude home tape in the mid-1970s. (Note: This recording is on the 1992 bootleg The Piano Tape, likely recorded around 1974.) It includes a slightly different melodic line which Everett believes is more historically accurate to the original composition.

McCartney began performing the song on radio, TV and in concert in 1977. On 25 January 1991, McCartney performed the song for a live audience. This performance is captured on his 1991 album, Unplugged (The Official Bootleg). According to the album's liner notes, the Unplugged record marked the first official release of the song.
