= Unplugged (The Official Bootleg) =

Live album by Paul McCartney
- Released: 20 May 1991
- Recorded: 25 January 1991
- Venue: Limehouse Studios, Wembley, UK
- Genre: Acoustic; folk; country; blues
- Length: 58:29
- Label: Parlophone
- Producer: Paul McCartney

Paul McCartney chronology
| Tripping the Live Fantastic (1990) | Unplugged (The Official Bootleg) (1991) | Paul McCartney's Liverpool Oratorio (1991) |

Professional ratings
Review scores
| Source | Rating |
|---|---|
| AllMusic | 4/5 stars |
| Encyclopedia of Popular Music | 3/5 stars |
| The Essential Rock Discography | 6/10 |
| The Rolling Stone Album Guide | 4/5 stars |

Unplugged (The Official Bootleg) is a live album of Paul McCartney's MTV Unplugged performance, recorded and released in 1991.

== Overview ==
Using the same line-up that had recently backed him on the 1989–1990 Paul McCartney World Tour (save for Blair Cunningham who had replaced Chris Whitten), Paul McCartney recorded his performance for the acoustic-only show MTV Unplugged on 25 January 1991 in the UK at Limehouse Studios, Wembley. McCartney performed three songs from his 1970 debut album McCartney, alongside several covers and six Beatles songs. The performance was broadcast by MTV the same day.

Subsequently, McCartney was the first in a long line of artists to release an album of their performance on the show.

== Songs ==
Several tracks performed in the show were not included on the album, as follows: "Mean Woman Blues", "Midnight Special", "Matchbox", "The Fool" and "Things We Said Today".

"Things We Said Today" and "Midnight Special" would see official release two years later in 1993 as B-sides to the "Biker Like an Icon" single. "Mean Woman Blues" was also released on promotional single only.

Songs rehearsed by the band but not performed at all include: "Mother Nature's Son", "Tequila", "Cut Across Shorty", "Cumberland Gap", "Hey Liley, Liley, Lo", "Froggie Went A-Courtin'", "Love Me Tender", "Rock Island Line" and "Freight Train".

== Release ==
Critical response to Unplugged (The Official Bootleg) was very warm. Initially released in a limited edition, individually numbered run in 1991, Unplugged (The Official Bootleg)—with artwork that recalls Снова в СССР's—was reissued in a more permanent fashion in the late 1990s. Upon its original issue, it reached number 7 in the UK and became McCartney's highest-peaking US album in almost ten years, reaching number 14.

== Track listing ==
Unplugged (The Official Bootleg)
| No. | Title | Writer(s) | Length |
|---|---|---|---|
| 1. | "Be-Bop-A-Lula" | Gene Vincent; Tex Davis | 4:04 |
| 2. | "I Lost My Little Girl" | Paul McCartney | 1:45 |
| 3. | "Here, There and Everywhere" | Lennon–McCartney | 3:16 |
| 4. | "Blue Moon of Kentucky" | Bill Monroe | 4:21 |
| 5. | "We Can Work It Out" | Lennon–McCartney | 2:48 |
| 6. | "San Francisco Bay Blues" | Jesse Fuller | 3:29 |
| 7. | "I've Just Seen a Face" | Lennon–McCartney | 3:01 |
| 8. | "Every Night" | McCartney | 3:24 |
| 9. | "She's a Woman" | Lennon–McCartney | 3:39 |
| 10. | "Hi-Heel Sneakers" | Robert Higginbotham | 4:08 |
| 11. | "And I Love Her" | Lennon–McCartney | 4:17 |
| 12. | "That Would Be Something" | McCartney | 4:02 |
| 13. | "Blackbird" | Lennon–McCartney | 2:09 |
| 14. | "Ain't No Sunshine" | Bill Withers | 4:05 |
| 15. | "Good Rockin' Tonight" | Roy Brown | 3:42 |
| 16. | "Singing the Blues" | Melvin Endsley | 3:46 |
| 17. | "Junk" (instrumental) | McCartney | 2:26 |

== Personnel ==
- Paul McCartney – acoustic guitar, vocals, drums on "Ain't No Sunshine", harmony vocals on "And I Love Her"
- Linda McCartney – Indian harmonium, percussion, vocals
- Hamish Stuart – acoustic bass guitar, acoustic guitar and lead vocals on "And I Love Her" and "Ain't No Sunshine"
- Robbie McIntosh – acoustic guitars, Dobro, vocals, piano on "Ain't No Sunshine"
- Paul "Wix" Wickens – piano, keyboards, accordion, percussion, vocals, acoustic bass on "Ain't No Sunshine"
- Blair Cunningham – drums, percussions, vocals

== Charts ==
Chart performance for Unplugged (The Official Bootleg)
| Chart (1991) | Peak position |
|---|---|
| Australian Albums (ARIA) | 81 |
| Dutch Albums (Album Top 100) | 42 |
| Norwegian Albums (VG-lista) | 13 |
| Swedish Albums (Sverigetopplistan) | 20 |
| Swiss Albums (Schweizer Hitparade) | 39 |
| UK Albums (OCC) | 7 |
| US Billboard 200 | 14 |
