= Momma Miss America =

Instrumental song by Paul McCartney

Song by Paul McCartney

from the album McCartney
- Released: 17 April 1970
- Recorded: 23-30 December 1969
- Studio: McCartney's home. London
- Genre: Rock
- Length: 4:04
- Label: Apple
- Songwriter: Paul McCartney
- Producer: Paul McCartney

McCartney track listing
- 13 tracks Side one: 1. "The Lovely Linda"; 2. "That Would Be Something"; 3. "Valentine Day"; 4. "Every Night"; 5. "Hot as Sun/Glasses"; 6. "Junk"; 7. "Man We Was Lonely"; Side two: 8. "Oo You"; 9. "Momma Miss America"; 10. "Teddy Boy"; 11. "Singalong Junk"; 12. "Maybe I'm Amazed"; 13. "Kreen-Akrore"

"Momma Miss America" is an instrumental by Paul McCartney from his debut solo album McCartney released in 1970.

== Recording ==
The song was recorded completely at McCartney's home in St. John's Wood. McCartney said in 1970: "An instrumental recorded completely at home. Made up as I went along – first a sequence of chords, then a melody on top."

McCartney later said of the song, "Originally it was two pieces, but they ran into each other by accident and became one." The original title of ‘Momma Miss America’ was ‘Rock ‘N’ Roll Springtime’, as shouted at the start of the recording. The edit of the two parts can be heard at the 1’57” point.

== Personnel ==
- Paul McCartney - piano, bass, acoustic and electric guitars, drums
