= Junk (song) =

- Cover of the song's sheet music

Song by Paul McCartney

from the album McCartney
- Published: Northern Songs Ltd.
- Released: 17 April 1970
- Recorded: 17 January and 18 February 1970
- Studio: Morgan, London
- Genre: Lo-fi
- Length: 1:54 ("Junk"); 2:36 ("Singalong Junk")
- Label: Apple
- Songwriter: Paul McCartney
- Producer: Paul McCartney

McCartney track listing
- 13 tracks Side one: 1. "The Lovely Linda"; 2. "That Would Be Something"; 3. "Valentine Day"; 4. "Every Night"; 5. "Hot as Sun/Glasses"; 6. "Junk"; 7. "Man We Was Lonely"; Side two: 8. "Oo You"; 9. "Momma Miss America"; 10. "Teddy Boy"; 11. "Singalong Junk"; 12. "Maybe I'm Amazed"; 13. "Kreen-Akrore"

"Junk" is a song written by English musician Paul McCartney and released on his debut studio album McCartney (1970). He started writing the song in 1968 with the Beatles while the group were studying Transcendental Meditation in India. After the band's return from India, he recorded a demo of the song at Kinfauns, George Harrison's home, before sessions for The Beatles (also known as "the White Album") took place. It was ultimately passed over for inclusion on The Beatles and Abbey Road in 1969. After John Lennon privately announced his departure from the band, McCartney recorded the song for inclusion on McCartney. A slightly longer, instrumental version of the song, titled "Singalong Junk", also appears on the album.

== History ==
McCartney started writing "Junk", along with another McCartney track, "Teddy Boy", during the Beatles' visit to India in 1968. The song was one of several the Beatles demoed at George Harrison's Kinfauns home before the recording of The Beatles (colloquially referred to as the White Album) in May 1968. It was released — along with six of the other so-called “Esher demos”, named after the town where Harrison’s house was located — on Anthology 3 in 1996. It was also included on the Super Deluxe Edition of the White Album in 2018, which featured all 27 Esher demos as a bonus disc. While the song was considered for the album, it was ultimately left off; neither did it find a place on Abbey Road. Having completed the song by early 1970, McCartney eventually recorded the song, along with "Teddy Boy", in February of the same year for his debut solo album McCartney. The song's working title was "Jubilee", and it was also referred to as "Junk in the Yard".

"Junk" was included on an EP (along with "Another Day", "Oh Woman, Oh Why" and "Valentine Day") released only in Mexico. Although McCartney has rarely performed the song live, his affinity for the tune (albeit without vocals, hence "Singalong Junk") is evident from its inclusion in his famous MTV Unplugged performance in 1992, nearly 25 years after it was originally written, during the credits. It was also included on the compilations Wingspan: Hits and History (2001) and Pure McCartney (2016).

== Composition ==
The lyrics of "Junk" feature the narrator describing various items found in a junk shop, including "parachutes", "army boots", and "sleeping bags for two" in the first two verses, and "candlesticks" and "building bricks" in the third one. The song's chorus ("'Buy, buy!', says the sign in the shop window / 'Why, why?', says the junk in the yard") reflects the fate of these objects. The song's lyrics have been interpreted as a meditation on the transience of human existence, and it has been speculated that they may also indirectly allude to the breakup of the Beatles and Paul McCartney's feelings about it.

Apart from the absence of vocals, "Singalong Junk" features mellotron strings and the melody played on a piano, as well as more prominent drums. It is said that "Singalong Junk" was originally the instrumental backing over which McCartney planned to sing, but he ultimately chose a simpler arrangement for the vocal version instead.

== Reception ==
Since release, "Junk" has received positive reviews from music critics, with many considering it a highlight of its parent album. In a review for McCartney on initial release, Langdon Winner of Rolling Stone complimented the album's use of simplicity, saying that it "works very well". Winner praised "Junk" and "Teddy Boy", describing both as "low pressure compositions with gentle, poignant lessons to convey" that are "very tasteful and fun to listen to." In a later article, the magazine ranked it as McCartney's 7th greatest solo song.

Donald A. Guarisco of AllMusic considers "Junk" one of the "finest moments" on McCartney, describing it as "a melancholy charmer of a ballad that has become a cult favorite with McCartney fans." Guarisco further praises McCartney's vocal performance, writing that it "captures [the song's] wistful mood nicely." In a retrospective review for McCartney, Record Collector has highlighted "Junk", along with "Every Night" and "Maybe I'm Amazed", as songs that "still sound absolutely effortless and demonstrate the man's natural genius with a melody". Joe Tangari of Pitchfork similarly evaluated both "Junk" and "Singalong Junk", with "Maybe I'm Amazed", as the "peaks" of McCartney.

== Personnel ==
"Junk"

- Paul McCartney – lead and harmony vocals, acoustic guitars, bass guitar, xylophone, drums

"Singalong Junk"

- Paul McCartney – acoustic and electric guitar, bass guitar, piano, Mellotron, drums

== Live versions ==
- "Junk" appeared on McCartney's 1991 album Unplugged (The Official Bootleg) but it is performed without vocals, effectively making it "Singalong Junk". However, it is not listed as such on the album.
- McCartney first performed "Junk" live in the Ghost Suite at the Royal Albert Hall, on 3 November 2006.

== Cover versions ==
- Sandie Shaw: a capella version on Reviewing the Situation, 1969 (with "Junk" included as bonus track on reissues from 2004 onwards)
- Chet Atkins: on Pickin' My Way, 1970
- Roger Williams: on Love Story, 1971
- Cilla Black: on Images, 1971
- John Denver: on Poems, Prayers, and Promises, 1971
- Anne Sofie von Otter and Elvis Costello: on For the Stars, 2001, combined in a medley with "Broken Bicycles" by Tom Waits
- Jeff Lynne: on The Art of McCartney, 2014
- Hailey Tuck: on Junk, 2018.

== Media appearances ==
- "Singalong Junk" has been included in the Jerry Maguire (1996), Hanging Up (2000) and My Wife Is an Actress (2001) soundtracks.
- It is featured in the opening episode of Season 3 of Parenthood.

== Bibliography ==
- Madinger, Chip; Easter, Mark (2000). Eight Arms to Hold You: The Solo Beatles Compendium. Chesterfield, MO: 44.1 Productions. ISBN 0-615-11724-4.
- Sulpy, Doug; Schweighardt, Ray (1997). Get Back: The Unauthorized Chronicle of The Beatles' Let It Be Disaster. New York, NY: St. Martin's Griffin. ISBN 0-312-19981-3.
- Winn, John C. (2009). That Magic Feeling: The Beatles' Recorded Legacy, Volume Two, 1966–1970. New York, NY: Three Rivers Press. ISBN 978-0-307-45239-9.
