= Maybe I'm Amazed =

1970 song by Paul McCartney

- 1970 Northern Songs sheet music cover

Song by Paul McCartney

from the album McCartney
- Published: Northern Songs
- Released: 17 April 1970
- Recorded: 15 February 1970 (Note: Older sources list a date of 22 February 1970.)
- Studio: EMI, London
- Genre: Soft rock; blue-eyed soul
- Length: 3:49
- Label: Apple
- Songwriter: Paul McCartney
- Producer: Paul McCartney

McCartney track listing
- 13 tracks Side one: 1. "The Lovely Linda"; 2. "That Would Be Something"; 3. "Valentine Day"; 4. "Every Night"; 5. "Hot as Sun/Glasses"; 6. "Junk"; 7. "Man We Was Lonely"; Side two: 8. "Oo You"; 9. "Momma Miss America"; 10. "Teddy Boy"; 11. "Singalong Junk"; 12. "Maybe I'm Amazed"; 13. "Kreen-Akrore"

Audio sample
- "Maybe I'm Amazed": file; help

Music video
- "Maybe I'm Amazed" on YouTube

"Maybe I'm Amazed" is a song by the English musician Paul McCartney first released on his 1970 debut solo album McCartney. He wrote it as a love song to his wife Linda, who helped him through a challenging period following the Beatles' break-up. The song was recorded in February 1970 at EMI Studios in London; McCartney played all instruments and produced the track, while Linda contributed backing vocals. A ballad, it is a confession spoken in the first-person that pours out bewilderment and fear at the love he feels along with thankfulness at his loved one's company.

The original recording was never released as a single, although the song received airplay and a promotional film. It has since appeared on several compilation albums. The song has since been a mainstay in McCartney's live performances. A 1976 live recording by McCartney's band Wings from the album Wings over America was released as a single in February 1977; this version became a top-ten hit in the United States and reached number 28 in the United Kingdom.

Critics praised "Maybe I'm Amazed" on its release as a standout of the McCartney album, and it has since been considered one of McCartney's best songs. Rolling Stone magazine ranked it one of the "500 Greatest Songs of All Time" in 2003 and later the best solo song by McCartney as well as by a former Beatle. The 1977 live recording was also praised, with some calling it the song's definitive version. Faces and Billy Joel are among the artists who have covered "Maybe I'm Amazed".

== Background and recording ==
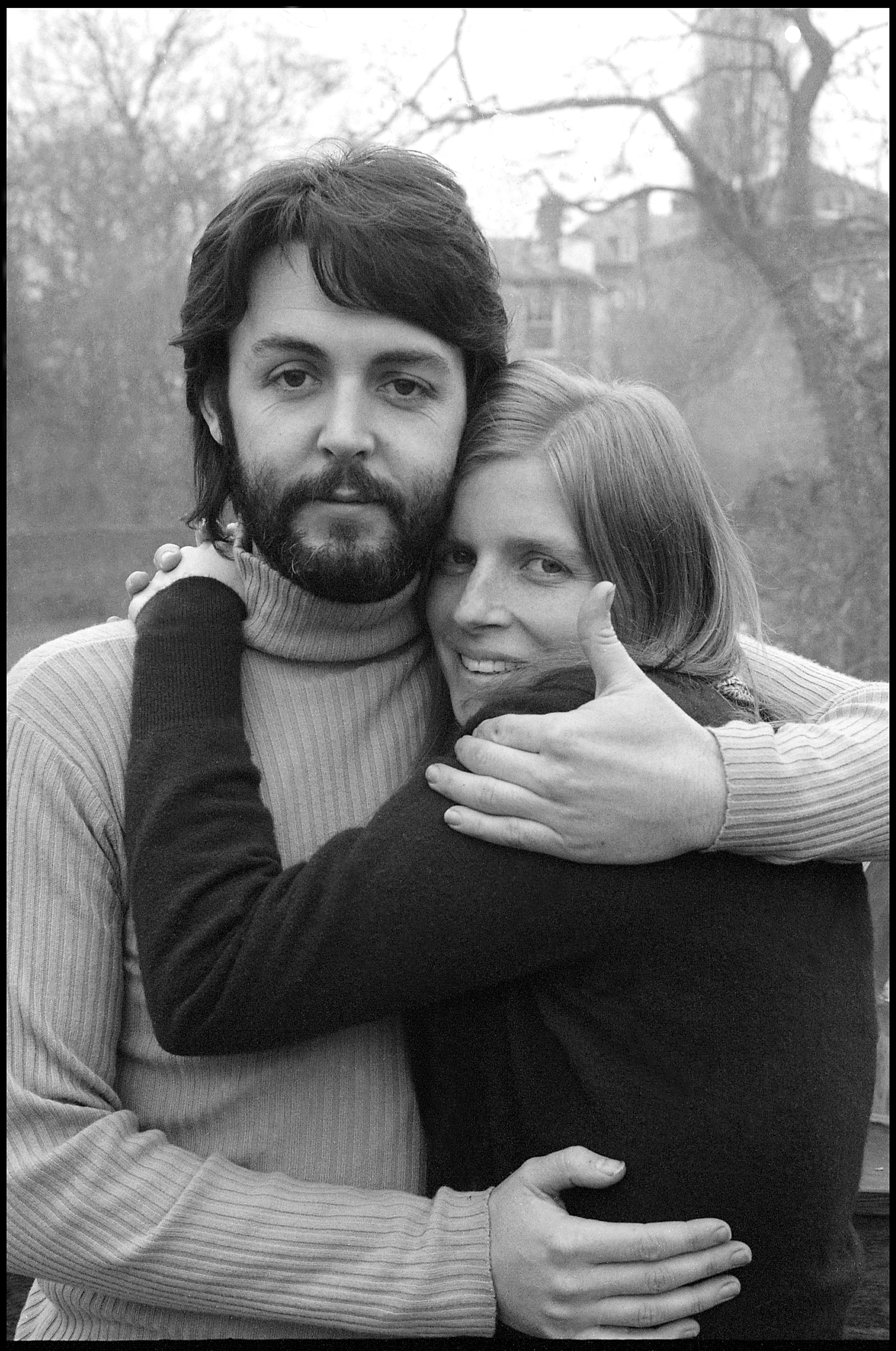
Paul McCartney wrote "Maybe I'm Amazed" as a love song to his wife Linda (pictured in 1969).

Paul McCartney wrote "Maybe I'm Amazed" on the piano in London sometime between 1968 and 1969. The song is about his wife Linda, whom he credited with helping him get through a difficult period following the break-up of the Beatles. Speaking with Paul Gambaccini for the 1976 book In His Own Words, Paul said: "It's like when you write millions of love songs, and finally when you're in love you'd like to write one for the person you're in love with." In another discussion with Beatles historian Mark Lewisohn, he said that the song "kind of wrote itself—reflecting my feelings towards her". In the book The Lyrics: 1956 to the Present (2021), he stated that the song's main idea was that "there's so often a split between the inner and outer". Paul also wrote "The Lovely Linda" about her.

Although most of his debut solo album was recorded at his London home, McCartney recorded "Maybe I'm Amazed" in EMI's Number Two studio in Abbey Road on 15 February 1970. He played all the instruments himself: guitars, bass, piano, organ and drums, and even produced the track. He sang lead vocals, while Linda contributed a small backing vocal part. EMI assigned Phil McDonald as the balance engineer, and Alan Parsons assisted him; Parsons remembered being impressed by Paul's efficiency and work ethic. Due to the quick recording pace, McCartney chose not to fix any mistakes. According to author Luca Perasi, the sound of drumsticks hitting each other is audible 44 seconds into the track; this was erased for the track's 2011 remaster.

== Composition ==
"Maybe I'm Amazed" is a first-person confession that conveys the speaker's fear and awe at the love he has as well as his need for company in times of trouble—all with a sense of gratitude and surprise, such as in the lines "the way you help me sing my song" and "you right me when I'm wrong". Author John Blaney describes the song as one of "deliverance and self-realisation". In The Lyrics, McCartney explained that it presents a relationship unconventionally, as it depicts "the fragility of love". He suggested the words, such as "Maybe I'm afraid of the way I love you", evoke pronounced fear and solitude. In a 2001 interview, he added:

It was to try and get a little deeper into a love song. The sort of stuff that you don't say to a girl except in a song. I think a lot of people relate to it. It's a quirky song, but people know what it means – it's the 'maybe' I'm amazed. A straight love song would say, 'I'm amazed at the way you love me.' But the 'maybe' is like a guy not quite wanting to admit it.

The song has been classified as a ballad in the soft rock and blue-eyed soul genres. Perasi compares its musical make-up to the Band's 1968 song "To Kingdom Come", which the Beatles had rehearsed during the Get Back sessions. "Maybe I'm Amazed" features various key changes, major-minor shifts and an unusual chord progression. Its introduction begins in D major before turning to a B♭ major chord to transition into C major for the verses and back to D major for the bridge. According to music professor Vincent Benitez Jr., McCartney's shifting between D major and C major in the opening reflects his personal insecurities, and his use of C minor, A♭ major and E♭ major chords "enhance[s] the expression" of the line "And maybe I'm amazed at the way I really need you". In the bridge, McCartney shifts from a melodic ballad voice to a harder, raw rock tone. The coda contains a false ending before continuing the main guitar solo and culminating in a fade-out.

== Release ==
"Maybe I'm Amazed" was released as the eleventh and penultimate track on the McCartney album on 17 April 1970 in the United Kingdom and 20 April in the United States. The song received substantial airplay but was not released as a single, a decision commentators have since questioned. McCartney later said of this choice:

Sometimes we're a bit daft here. We have a bit of funky organisation, you know, which isn't that clued in to picking up tracks off albums. At the time, we thought 'Maybe I'm Amazed' was a good track and maybe we should do that as a single, which it probably should have been ...

He ultimately decided to not release any singles from McCartney. Author John Winn wondered if McCartney did this to spite the Beatles' manager Allen Klein, whose company ABKCO would have profited from the single's sales.

A promotional film was made, directed by David Putnam and produced by Charlie Jenkins. It features some of Linda's still photographs of Paul, herself and their daughter Heather; it aired in the UK on 19 April 1970 on LWT in its own slot and later as part of an episode of CBS's Ed Sullivan Show. According to the chronicler Keith Badman, the London airing was an unprecedented decision for a promotional film of pop music.

=== Later releases ===
The original recording of "Maybe I'm Amazed" has been included on the compilation albums All the Best! (1987; only on the UK release), Wingspan: Hits and History (2001) and Pure McCartney (2016). McCartney and his band Wings recorded a new studio version live at Abbey Road Studios on 28 August 1974 for the documentary One Hand Clapping. The recording was left unreleased until it appeared on the 2011 reissue of McCartney and later on the One Hand Clapping live album in 2024. An orchestral version came out on McCartney's classical music album Working Classical in 1999.

A modified version of "Maybe I'm Amazed" appears in "Lisa the Vegetarian", a 1995 episode of the American animated sitcom The Simpsons; Paul and Linda starred as themselves in the episode. In it, Paul tells Lisa Simpson that playing "Maybe I'm Amazed" backwards will reveal "a recipe for a really rippin' lentil soup". Showrunner David Mirkin had McCartney record the recipe, which was added in reverse over the original song. Known as the "Recipe Remix", this version of the song plays in the final scene, then over the episode's closing credits. McCartney thought it amusing that the writing staff wanted to "send up the whole cult thing" of backmasking on the Beatles' songs, saying: "A secret lentil soup recipe seemed a nice parody of that."

== Critical reception ==
Although music critics castigated McCartney, "Maybe I'm Amazed" was generally praised on its original release. Langdon Winner of Rolling Stone described it as a powerful track that states "one of the main sub-themes of the record, that the terrible burden of loneliness can be dispelled by love". Winner continued: "This is the only song on the album that even comes close to McCartney's best efforts of the past. It succeeds marvelously." Additionally, Melody Maker's Richard Williams argued that the song would have been a classic had it been released on Abbey Road (1969). Robert Hilburn of the Los Angeles Times argued that "Maybe I'm Amazed" was one of the only "rewarding" songs on McCartney, and one that would be a "strong element on any Beatles album". He also thought McCartney sang it "with just the right spark of outrageous abandonment". McCartney's former bandmates John Lennon and George Harrison showed appreciation for the song as well. The former sang a verse of it during a 1972 interview with his wife Yoko Ono, and the latter admitted that he did not care for the McCartney album but thought "Maybe I'm Amazed" was "great".

In retrospective reviews for McCartney, "Maybe I'm Amazed" is generally highlighted as one of the album's standouts. Record Collector has noted "Maybe I'm Amazed", along with "Every Night" and "Junk", as songs that "still sound absolutely effortless and demonstrate [McCartney's] natural genius with a melody". Joe Tangari of Pitchfork similarly evaluated it, along with "Junk" and "Singalong Junk", as the "peaks" of McCartney. Writing for AllMusic, Stephen Thomas Erlewine said that only a few tracks on McCartney stand as classics, and "Maybe I'm Amazed" is one of them. In another review, Erlewine said the song was arguably McCartney's greatest composition. Consequence of Sound's Karina Halle describes the song as "timeless" and "heartbreakingly sincere". Rob Sheffield of Rolling Stone calls it McCartney's "most soulful, passionate, unforgettable love song".

McCartney's biographers have also praised "Maybe I'm Amazed". Chip Madinger and Mark Easter consider it McCartney's "first classic solo" song. Perasi holds it to be "the most representative and noteworthy song in McCartney's solo career", while Allan Kozinn and Adrian Sinclair say the song equalled his greatest work with the Beatles in quality. Peter Ames Carlin agrees, saying that "Maybe I'm Amazed" was the only song on McCartney that nearly "recaptur[ed] the majesty" of the Beatles' latest record to date, Abbey Road. Author John Winn argues the guitar solo is one of McCartney's finest. Philip Norman described the song as "a soaring ballad whose unspoken eroticism matched the best of Cole Porter".

"Maybe I'm Amazed" was placed at number 347 in Rolling Stone's 2003 list of the "500 Greatest Songs of All Time". The same magazine also ranked it McCartney's best solo song in 2020 and the best solo song by a former Beatle four years later. Staff writers called it a "triumph" of McCartney's solo era and "an understated but perfect beginning to a truly remarkable second act". In 2022, Chris Willman of Variety ranked it McCartney's fourth best song overall and crowned it "one of pop's great ecstatic experiences". It was also featured in an Ultimate Classic Rock list compiling the 200 best rock songs of the 1970s. In a late 2009 Q&A with journalists held in London to promote his live album Good Evening New York City, McCartney said "Maybe I'm Amazed" was the song he would most wish to be remembered for. He explained: "Because John [Lennon] would sing it."

== Live recordings ==
"Maybe I'm Amazed"

Single by Wings

from the album Wings over America
- B-side: "Soily"
- Released: 4 February 1977
- Recorded: 29 May 1976
- Venue: Kemper Arena, Kansas City, Missouri
- Genre: Rock
- Length: 5:11; 3:43 (radio edit)
- Label: Parlophone; Capitol
- Songwriter: Paul McCartney
- Producer: Paul McCartney

Wings singles chronology
"Let 'Em In" (1976)	"Maybe I'm Amazed" (1977)	"Seaside Woman" (1977)

Following its original release, "Maybe I'm Amazed" became a staple of McCartney's live shows, appearing on most of his concert tours both with Wings and as a solo performer. (Note: The song has been excluded from the Wings University Tour (1972), the Unplugged Tour (1991) and the Good Evening Europe Tour (2009).) A version from the Wings Over the World tour, recorded on 29 May 1976 at the Kemper Arena in Kansas City, Missouri, was released on the live album Wings over America in December 1976. This version has a slower tempo than the original McCartney version, at 70 beats per minute compared to the original's 80, and a longer coda. Because the live album was a commercial success, EMI executives sought to extend the album's chart run by releasing a single from it; they chose "Maybe I'm Amazed" since the song had never been issued as a single. For its B-side, the label selected "Soily", which had yet to be officially released.

The single was released by Parlophone on 4 February 1977 in the UK and by Capitol Records three days later in the US. Promotional discs were issued for radio stations, which trimmed it from 5:11 to 3:43. It was a commercial success and reached number 10 on the US Billboard Hot 100 and number 28 on the UK singles chart. This single later featured on The 7" Singles Box in 2022.

The live version also received positive reviews from critics, being called "superb", "emotional", "brilliant", "alive" and "right on target". Roy Carr of the NME described it as one of McCartney's "finest hours" and "a truly majestic cut" from Wings over America that was "almost as good" as cover versions by Rod Stewart and the Faces. Record World wrote: "Already a classic and familiar track, this version comes without the false ending. You'll be amazed, too." Billboard described the live version as "grittier" and displaying "more rock roots" than the original studio recording. Professor Dario Martinelli referred to this live recording as the definitive version of the song.

Live performances of the song typically featured an extended coda to showcase McCartney's vocals. According to Martinelli, McCartney has tended to perform "Maybe I'm Amazed" in the style of the Wings over America live version rather than the McCartney studio recording. The song has since appeared on several other McCartney live albums. These include Tripping the Live Fantastic (1990) and Back in the U.S. (2002). Additional live recordings have appeared on the Paul McCartney Archive Collection releases of McCartney (2011), Wings over America (2013) and Wings over Europe (2018), as well as in the Wings Over the World television film (1979).

== Cover versions ==
Since its original release, "Maybe I'm Amazed" has been covered by numerous artists. One of the first covers was by a band called Fickle Pickle, who released a cover as a single on Philips Records on 13 August 1970. The Faces recorded a studio version of the song in 1970 and released it as a US-only single, while a live version appeared on their 1971 album Long Player. In a review for Long Player, AllMusic's Stephen Thomas Erlewine calls their version an "extraordinary reworking" that "soars in ways Macca's exceptional original never did". In 1998, Carleen Anderson's version of the song reached number 26 in the UK. Billy Joel covered the song for the 2014 tribute album The Art of McCartney.

== Personnel ==
According to author John C. Winn:

McCartney studio version:

- Paul McCartney – lead and backing vocals, lead and rhythm guitars, bass, piano, organ, drums
- Linda McCartney – backing vocals

== Charts ==
=== Weekly charts ===
Chart (1977)	Peak position
Canada RPM Top Singles	9
UK Singles Chart	28
US Billboard Hot 100	10
US Cash Box Top 100	10

=== Year-end charts ===
Chart (1977)	Position
Canada	96
US Cash Box	94

== Certifications ==
Certification for "Maybe I'm Amazed"
Region	Certification	Certified units/sales
New Zealand (RMNZ)	Gold	15,000^{‡}
^{‡} Sales+streaming figures based on certification alone.
