= Cavendish Avenue =

Street in St John's Wood, London, England

Coordinates: 51°31′53.9″N 0°10′21.73″W

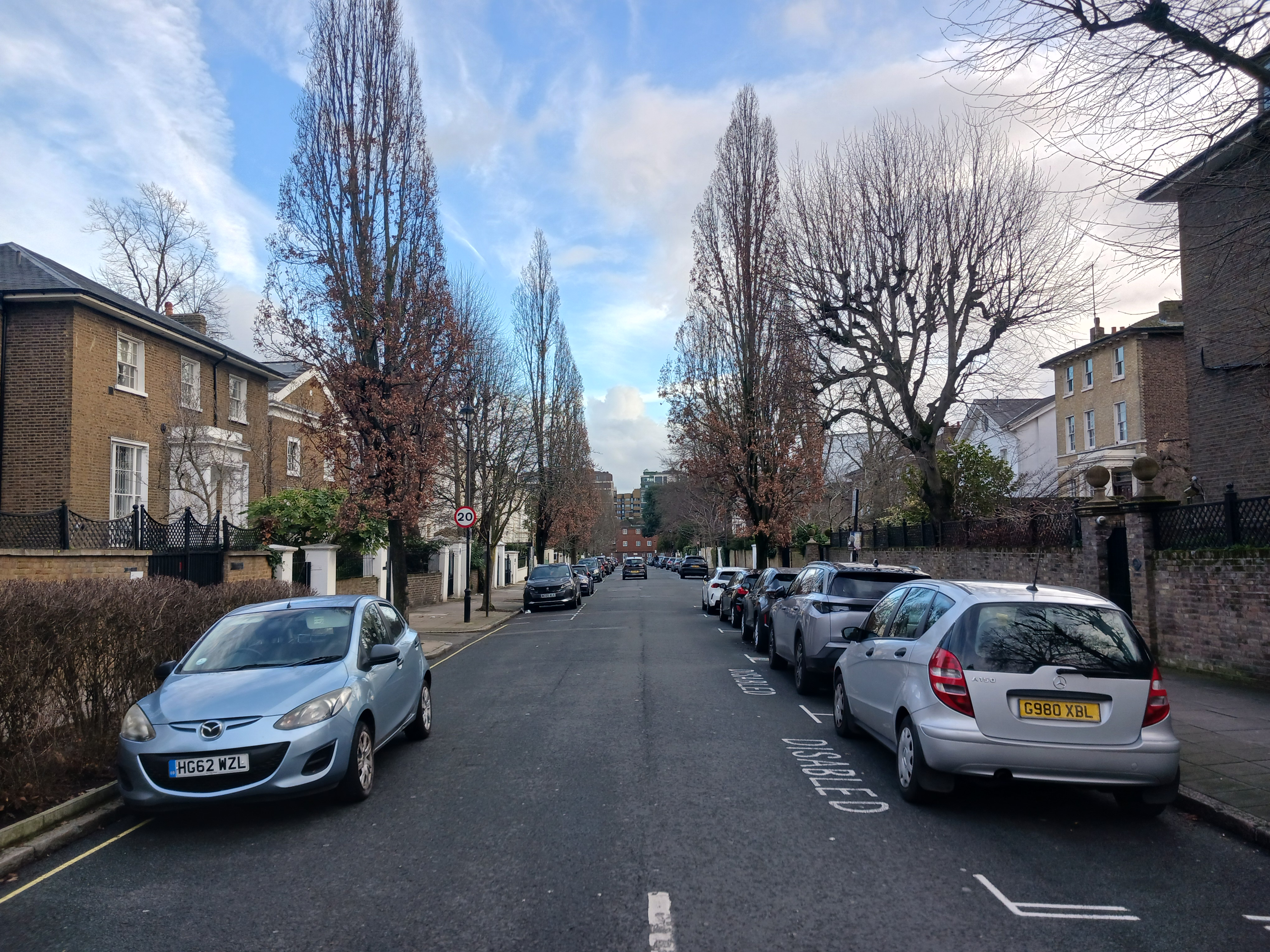
Cavendish Avenue, facing south

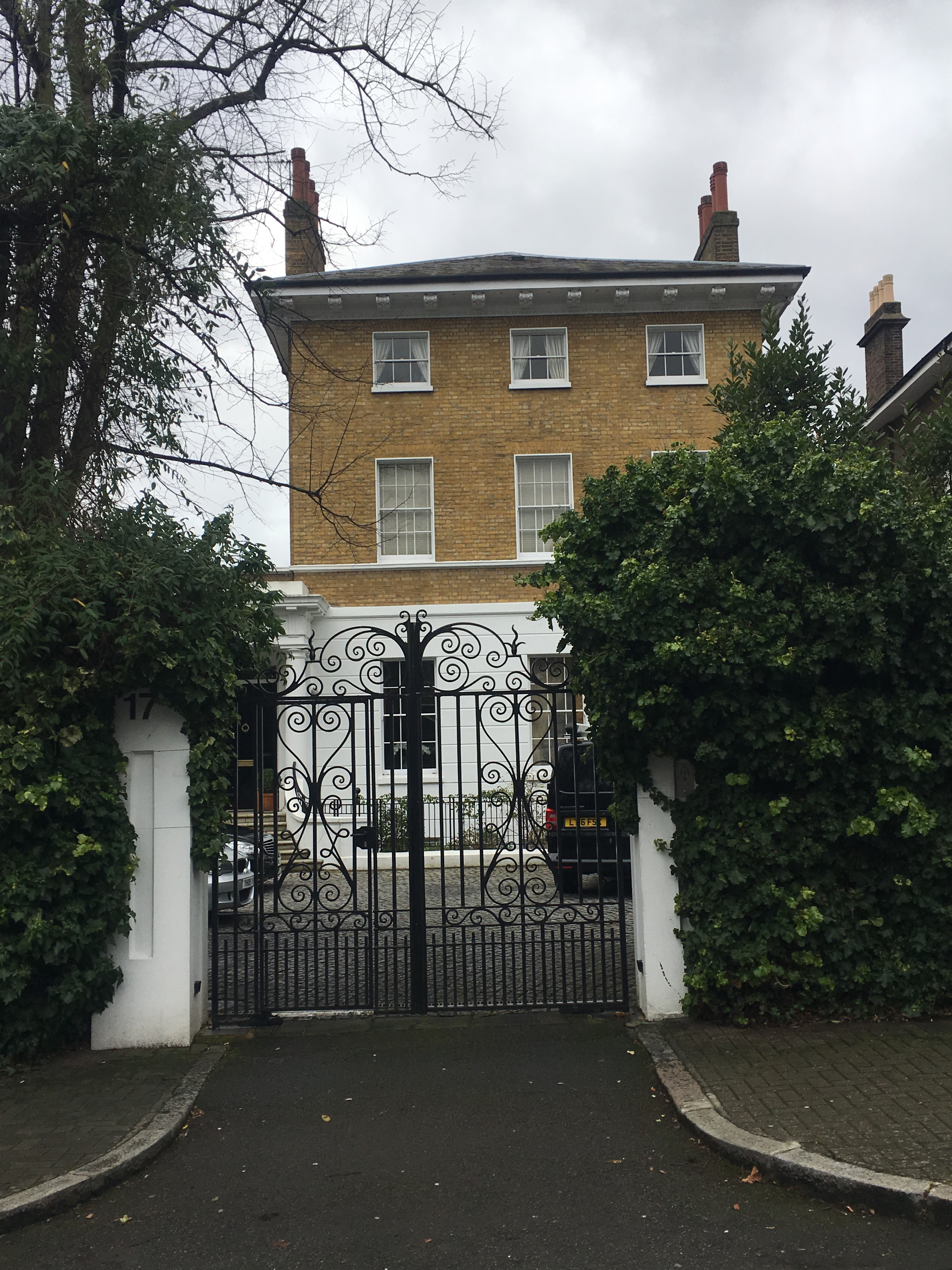
17 Cavendish Avenue

Cavendish Avenue is a street in St John's Wood, London, England.

Cavendish Avenue runs north to south from Circus Road to Wellington Place, and is parallel to Wellington Road to the east. At its southern end lies Lord's Cricket Ground. The street is named after the Cavendish family, who were prominent landowners in the area.

Number 7 has been Paul McCartney's London home since he bought it in April 1965 for £40,000, from Desmond O'Neill, a doctor. It lies close to Abbey Road Studios.

Another notable resident was Billy Fury, who lived at Number 1.
