= McCartney (album) =

Studio album by Paul McCartney
- Released: 17 April 1970
- Recorded: 1 December 1969 – 25 February 1970
- Studio: McCartney's home, London; Morgan, Willesden, London; EMI, London
- Genre: Lo-fi
- Length: 34:22
- Label: Apple
- Producer: Paul McCartney

Paul McCartney chronology
The Family Way (1967)	McCartney (1970)	Ram (1971)

McCartney is the debut solo studio album by the English rock musician Paul McCartney, released on 17 April 1970 by Apple Records. McCartney recorded it in secrecy, mostly using basic home-recording equipment at his house in St John's Wood. Mixing and some recording took place at professional London studios. In its loosely arranged performances, McCartney eschewed the polish of the Beatles' records in favour of a lo-fi style. Apart from occasional vocal contributions by his wife, Linda, McCartney performed the entire album alone by overdubbing on four-track tape.

McCartney recorded the album during a period of depression and confusion, following John Lennon's private departure from the Beatles in September 1969. Conflicts over the release of McCartney's album further estranged him from his bandmates, as he refused to delay the album's release to allow for Apple's previously scheduled titles, notably the Beatles' album Let It Be. A press release in the form of a self-interview supplied with UK promotional copies of McCartney led to the Beatles' break-up.

McCartney received mostly unfavorable reviews, while McCartney himself was vilified for seemingly ending the Beatles. The record was widely criticised for being under-produced and for its unfinished songs, although the ballad "Maybe I'm Amazed" was consistently singled out for praise. Commercially, McCartney benefited from the publicity surrounding the break-up; it held the number 1 position for three weeks on the US Billboard Top LPs before yielding that position to Let It Be. It peaked at number 2 in Britain.

In later years, the retrospective reviews became more favourable, and the album was credited for influencing DIY musicians and lo-fi music styles. McCartney also recorded two successor albums: McCartney II (1980) and McCartney III (2020). In 2011, the first McCartney record was reissued with bonus tracks as part of the Paul McCartney Archive Collection.

== Background ==
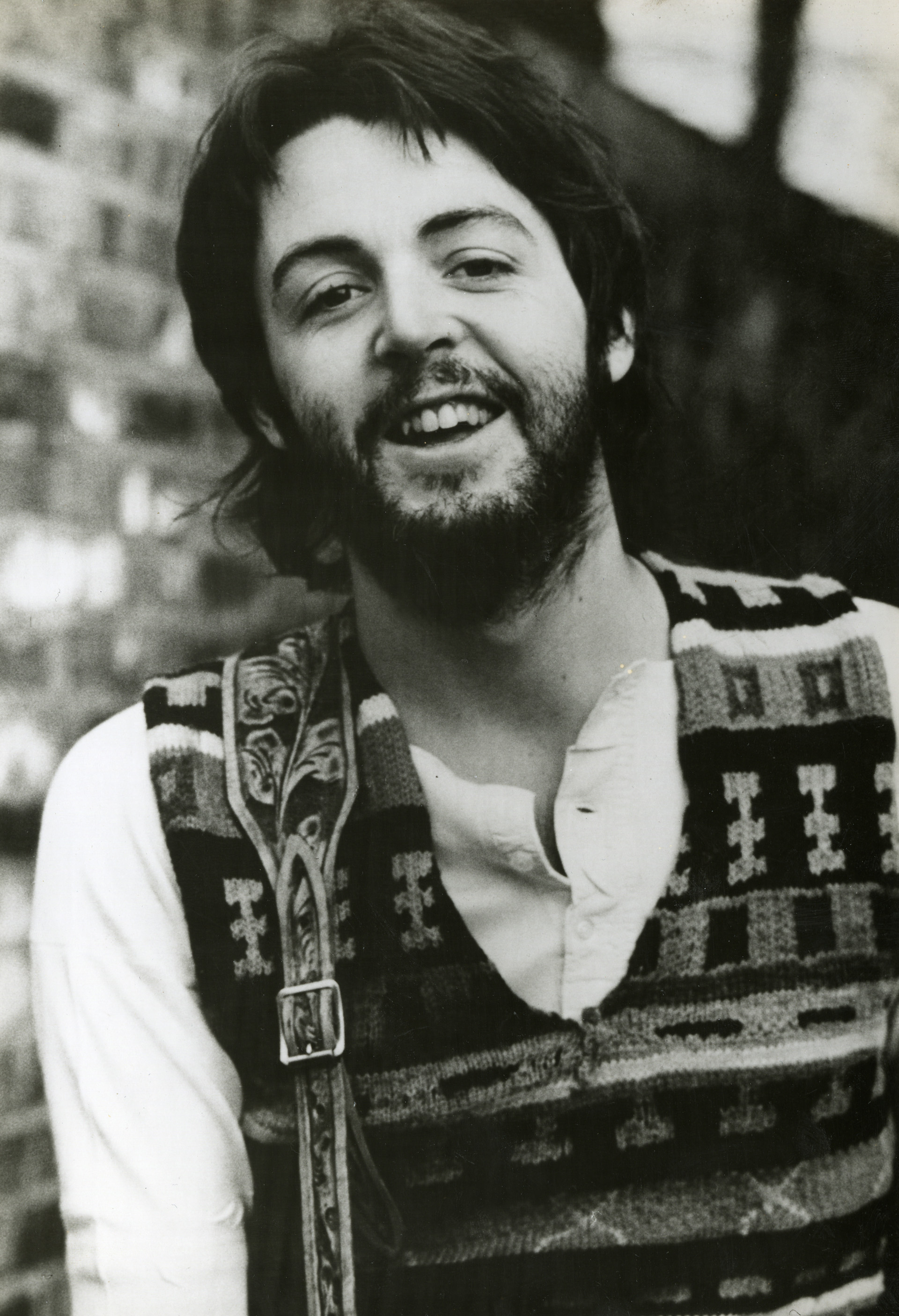
McCartney at his home in 1969, around the time he recorded tracks for McCartney

After John Lennon requested a "divorce" from the Beatles in a band meeting on 20 September 1969, Paul McCartney withdrew to his farm in Campbeltown, Scotland. Author Robert Rodriguez describes his frame of mind as "brokenhearted, shocked, and dispirited at the loss of the only job he had ever known". While Lennon's departure was not made official, partly for business reasons, McCartney's period in seclusion with his family coincided with widespread rumours in America that he had died – an escalation of the three-year-old "Paul Is Dead" rumour. The rumour was dispelled by journalists from BBC Radio and Life magazine, who tracked him down at his farm, High Park.

I nearly had a breakdown. I suppose the hurt of it all, and the disappointment, and the sorrow of losing this great band, these great friends ... I was going crazy.

— McCartney to daughter Mary, 2001

McCartney's two months in Scotland created an estrangement between him and his bandmates, further to the division caused by their appointment of Allen Klein as business manager in May that year. McCartney later cited Klein's appointment as the first "irreconcilable difference" within the Beatles, since he continued to favour New York lawyers Lee Eastman and John Eastman – father and brother, respectively, of his wife Linda. For McCartney, the period following Lennon's departure was also marked by a bout of severe depression, during which, in his own estimation, he came close to suffering a nervous breakdown.

In his book Fab: An Intimate Life of Paul McCartney, Howard Sounes writes of the McCartneys' exile at High Park: "This was grim for Linda. She had a seven-year-old and a baby to look after, with a husband who was depressed and drunk. She later told friends it was one of the most difficult times in her life, while Paul reflected that he might have become a rock 'n' roll casualty at this point in his career." With Linda's encouragement, McCartney began to consider a future outside the Beatles, by writing or finishing songs for his first solo album, McCartney.

== Content and recording ==
=== Studer home recordings, December 1969 – January 1970 ===
I was like a professor in his laboratory. Very simple [set-up], as basic as you can get ... Even now that album has an interesting sound. Very analogue, very direct.

— McCartney, 2001

McCartney and his family returned to London shortly before Christmas 1969, and he started work on the album at his home in Cavendish Avenue, St John's Wood. The recordings were carried out on a recently delivered Studer four-track tape recorder, without a mixing desk, and therefore without VU displays as a guide for recording levels. McCartney described his home-recording set-up as "Studer, one mic, and nerve". He played all the musical instruments on the album – from acoustic and electric guitars and bass to keyboards, drums and various percussion instruments – with Linda supplying backing vocals on some songs.

The album's recordings eschewed the musical sophistication that distinguished the Beatles' work with producer George Martin, particularly the band's 1969 release Abbey Road. According to The New Rolling Stone Encyclopedia of Rock & Roll, McCartney is "a one-man-studio-band LP" with "a pronounced homemade quality; it was spare and sounded almost unfinished". Rodriguez writes that in his avoidance of the Abbey Road studio aesthetic, "In his own way, [McCartney] was fulfilling the 'as-nature-intended' theme of the aborted 'Get Back' sessions, albeit as a one-and-a-half man band."

McCartney first taped a 45-second portion of a song he wrote in Campbeltown, "The Lovely Linda". As with much of the album, McCartney sang the composition accompanied by acoustic guitar before filling the remaining tracks on the Studer with a second guitar part, bass and percussive accompaniment. Although this performance of "The Lovely Linda" was only intended as a test of the new equipment, it would be included on the official release, as the opening track, complete with the sound of McCartney giggling at the end of the recording. Reflected in the sequencing of the album, the second and third songs McCartney taped were "That Would Be Something", also written in Scotland, and the instrumental "Valentine Day". The latter was one of three selections on McCartney that its creator "ad-libbed on the spot", he later said, along with the similarly rock-oriented "Momma Miss America" and "Oo You".

On 3 January 1970, he interrupted work on McCartney to participate in the Beatles' final recording session, when he, George Harrison and Ringo Starr recorded the Harrison composition "I Me Mine" at EMI Studios (now Abbey Road Studios); Lennon and Yoko Ono were on holiday in Denmark at the time. The next day, the three musicians revisited McCartney's "Let It Be", a song recorded by the band in January 1969 for their forthcoming Get Back film project.

=== Morgan Studios, February 1970 ===
On 12 February, McCartney took his Studer tapes to Morgan Studios, in the north-west London suburb of Willesden, to copy all the four-track recordings onto eight-track tape, to allow for further overdubbing. To maintain the project's secrecy, McCartney worked at Morgan under the pseudonym "Billy Martin". (Note: Linda McCartney, a New Yorker, booked the studio dates, choosing to use the name of Major League Baseball star Billy Martin, who played with the New York Yankees for much of the 1950s and later managed the team.) By this point, he had also taped "Junk" and "Teddy Boy" at Cavendish Avenue, two songs he began writing during the Beatles' 1968 visit to India and had rehearsed with the band in January 1969. The other recordings transferred to eight-track included "Glasses" – a sound effects piece featuring "wineglasses played at random", in McCartney's description – and "Singalong Junk", an instrumental version of "Junk" to which he now added a strings part played on a Mellotron. Among other overdubs on these eight-track mixes, McCartney supplied a vocal to the previously instrumental "Oo You".

While at Morgan, he also taped "Hot as Sun", a "Polynesian-influenced" instrumental dating from the late 1950s, according to author Bruce Spizer, and "Kreen-Akrore", which Sounes describes as an "experimental percussion track". Recorded on 15 February, "Kreen-Akrore" was McCartney's attempt to describe sonically a hunt by the Kreen-Akrore tribespeople of the Brazilian Amazon, after he had watched an ATV documentary on their way of life. Amid musical interludes featuring electric guitar, organ and piano, McCartney used a bow and arrow he purchased at the Knightsbridge department store Harrods, according to engineer Robin Black. The latter was among the few people who knew that McCartney was making a solo album. Linda contributed the breathing and animal-like sounds, with McCartney, on "Kreen-Akrore".

=== EMI Studios, February–March 1970 ===
"Maybe I'm Amazed"
A 25-second sample of the song

On 21 February 1970, McCartney moved to the more familiar EMI Studios, with the booking again under the name of Billy Martin. There, he carried out further mixing on the previously recorded material, as well as taping new selections. On 22 February, McCartney recorded "Every Night" – another composition rehearsed during the Get Back sessions, and a song that authors Chip Madinger and Mark Easter note as the "first 'professional' recording" on the finished album, given its position as track 4, following "Valentine Day". On 15 February McCartney recorded "Maybe I'm Amazed", a piano-based ballad dedicated to Linda, and, in Madinger and Easter's description, "the most elaborate instrumental track on the LP". The final new recording for McCartney was "Man We Was Lonely", which he taped on 25 February, having composed it earlier that day. It is the track on the album on which Linda's vocals are most audible.

Final mixes of songs such as "Junk" and "Teddy Boy" were completed at Morgan Studios along with the remaining tracks on the album. During this process, "Hot as Sun" and "Glasses" were segued into a medley, ending with a snippet of McCartney performing the song "Suicide" on piano. Unacknowledged in the track listing for the album, "Suicide" was a composition that he had intended for Frank Sinatra to record. (Note: A full performance of the song by McCartney was released on the 2011 reissue of McCartney.) He also edited two separate instrumental pieces into one for "Momma Miss America"; McCartney can be heard shouting the first portion's original title, "Rock 'n' Roll Springtime", on the recording.

On 23 March, while American producer Phil Spector began mixing the Get Back tapes for release as the Beatles' Let It Be album in EMI's Studio 4, McCartney completed work on his album in Studio 2. Although McCartney has frequently maintained that he was ignorant of Spector's involvement until receiving an acetate copy of Let It Be for approval, author Peter Doggett writes that after "several weeks", McCartney had finally "answered the string of messages he'd received about Phil Spector" and had agreed to let him prepare Let It Be for release.

== Artwork ==
Back cover of the McCartney album; photo by Linda McCartney

For the album's gatefold cover, artist Gordon House and designer Roger Huggett worked on a design concept by McCartney. Photos by Linda McCartney featured throughout the packaging, including a collage of 21 family snapshots in the jacket's inner spread. The images depicted Paul, Linda, seven-year-old Heather (Linda's daughter by her first marriage), newborn Mary, and the McCartneys' sheepdog, Martha. The gatefold cover of McCartney was the first of close to 30 years of albums by her husband to feature Linda McCartney's photography.

Set against a black background, the front cover image consisted of a bowl of cherry-red liquid placed on a cream-coloured wall and surrounded by loose red cherries, as if the fruit had been emptied from the bowl. On the back cover, a photo taken by Linda in Scotland showed her husband with Mary tucked inside his fur-lined leather jacket. Madinger and Easter comment that, unlike Lennon, McCartney did not feel the need to include his wife on the cover, and her back-cover photo was a "stunning" contribution from the former professional photographer. In a 2013 news article recalling the album's release, the Philadelphia radio station WMMR described the photo of McCartney and his baby daughter as "iconic" and reflective of "his ultimate message: 'Home, family (and) love'."

== Release ==
=== Scheduling conflict ===
Maybe John was right. Maybe the Beatles were crap. The sooner I get this album out and get it over with the better.

— McCartney commenting after finishing work on his debut solo album

McCartney said that he "boycotted" Apple's offices after Klein's arrival in 1969 and his continued isolation in 1970 led to Lennon, Harrison and Starr making business decisions without McCartney's input. One decision concerned the release of the Let It Be documentary, a necessity in order to fulfil the Beatles' contractual obligations to film company United Artists. (Note: Although the 1968 animated feature Yellow Submarine was intended as the last of three Beatles films owed to United Artists, the band themselves appeared only briefly at the end of the film. By mid 1969, the threat of possible litigation between the Beatles and United Artists led to director Michael Lindsay-Hogg preparing Let It Be for a cinema release, rather than for airing as a television special as originally planned.) McCartney privately agreed to a mid-April release date for McCartney with Apple Records executive Neil Aspinall, one of the few people associated with the Beatles who was aware of the project. Its late addition to Apple's schedule clashed with the imminent release of the Let It Be album, and of Starr's solo debut, Sentimental Journey, which was due out on 27 March. On 25 March, after discovering that Klein arranged to have the release of McCartney postponed, McCartney received an assurance from Harrison, as a director of Apple Records, that his solo album would be issued on 17 April, as planned. (Note: After learning of Klein's attempts to delay the album, McCartney had instructed John Eastman to retrieve the master tape, after which McCartney threatened Apple's US distributor, Capitol Records, that he would release it with a different record company unless they issued the album straight away.)

The situation then changed when Spector reported that work on the Let It Be album was almost complete, meaning that it could be issued to coincide with the film's world premiere, which was scheduled for 28 April, in New York. Doggett writes that "the solution was obvious", since Let It Be was "a multimedia package" and, as a band venture rather than a solo album, it "should automatically take precedence". Harrison and Lennon therefore wrote to McCartney on 31 March to say that they had instructed EMI, Apple's parent label, to postpone his album until 4 June; they also explained the need to stagger the various new releases, particularly in America, where the Hey Jude compilation had been issued on 26 February. Rather than have a member of staff deliver the letter to McCartney at Cavendish Avenue, Starr decided to take it to him personally.

McCartney later described the tone of Starr's message as "the party line", to which he reacted badly: "I told [Starr] to get out. I had to do something like that in order to assert myself because I was just sinking ... I was getting pummelled about the head, in my mind anyway." According to Starr, McCartney "went crazy", threatening: "I'll finish you now. You'll pay!" Although the other Beatles backed down over the release of McCartney, the confrontation initiated what Rodriguez terms "a three-against-one war" within the band.

=== Press release and the Beatles' break-up ===
On 9 April, McCartney released a Q&A package to the British press, in which he explained his reasons for making his solo album and described its overall theme as "Home, Family, Love". Compiled with the help of Apple executives Derek Taylor and Peter Brown, the self-interview also contained questions McCartney imagined he would be asked regarding the possibility of the Beatles splitting up. While stopping short of saying that the band was finished, McCartney stated that he did not know whether his "break with the Beatles" would be temporary or permanent and that it was based on business, personal and creative differences. He also said that he had not missed Starr's drumming, nor any of his bandmates' contributions, when making the album, and could not envisage a time when he and Lennon would write together again. When asked whether Klein and his company ABKCO would be "in any way involved with the production, manufacturing, distribution or promotion of this new album", McCartney said, "Not if I can help it", and he stressed that Klein was in no way his business representative. Although McCartney later recalled that he was responding to questions put to him, Brown said that McCartney wrote all the questions, as did Taylor. (Note: Taylor added: "He was only supposed to write out information explaining how he made his album. Instead he hands us this interview with himself asking questions such as would he miss Ringo. It was entirely gratuitous.")

That same day, McCartney called Lennon at the clinic where he was undergoing primal scream therapy with his wife, Yoko Ono. McCartney told him that he was following Lennon's example and leaving the Beatles, but he made no mention of making his departure public. Doggett suggests that McCartney's intention was not necessarily to break up the band, and cites Beatles confidant Ray Connolly's recollection that McCartney was "devastated" by the media's interpretation of his self-interview. The first reaction from the press was a piece by Don Short of the Daily Mirror, on 10 April, titled "PAUL IS QUITTING THE BEATLES". From there, in author Mark Hertsgaard's description, "newspaper headlines around the world reduced the story to screaming variations of PAUL BREAKS UP THE BEATLES".

=== Sales and promotion ===
It's a simple fact that [McCartney] can't have his own way, so he's causing chaos. I put out four albums last year, and I didn't say a fucking word about quitting.

— John Lennon, May 1970

McCartney was released in Britain on 17 April 1970 (as Apple PCS 7102), and three days later in America (Apple STAO 3363). While the reports about the Beatles' break-up caused McCartney's standing among Beatles fans to plummet, they also ensured that the album was highly publicised. Adding to this exposure in the US, McCartney commissioned a second set of print advertisements for the album, to counter what Doggett describes as Klein's "incendiary statement of fact" in the official advertisements that Apple was "an ABKCO-managed company".

In the UK, McCartney debuted at number 2, where it remained for three weeks behind the best-selling album of 1970, Simon and Garfunkel's Bridge Over Troubled Water. By 15 May, McCartney had sold over 1 million copies in the US, and from 23 May, began a three-week stay at number 1 on the Billboard Top LPs chart, eventually going double platinum. Despite "Maybe I'm Amazed" receiving considerable airplay on US radio, McCartney refused to issue it or any other song from the album as a single. (Note: Incorporating still photographs taken by Linda, a 35mm promotional film for "Maybe I'm Amazed" aired on The Ed Sullivan Show and other US entertainment shows.)

McCartney's former bandmates viewed his making the band's break-up public as a betrayal in light of how Lennon had acquiesced to the group's interests by staying silent about his departure the previous year, and as McCartney using the end of the Beatles as a way to promote his solo album. When asked for his opinion of the album shortly after its release, Harrison described "Maybe I'm Amazed" and "That Would Be Something" as "great", but the rest, he said, "just don't do much for me". Harrison added that, unlike Lennon, Starr and himself, McCartney was probably too "isolated" from other musicians, such that: "The only person he's got to tell him if the song's good or bad is Linda." In a December 1970 interview with Rolling Stone editor Jann Wenner, which was re-published the following year as the book Lennon Remembers, Lennon dismissed McCartney as "rubbish" and "Engelbert Humperdinck music"; he said that his primal therapy-inspired album John Lennon/Plastic Ono Band would "probably scare [McCartney] into doing something decent". Lennon rejected Wenner's interpretation of the back cover portrait as a possible reference to Ono's recent miscarriage; instead, he read it as an example of the McCartneys slavishly following his and Ono's lead by releasing a family-oriented album. (Note: For the front cover of their 1969 LP Life with the Lions, Lennon and Ono had used a picture of themselves taken in their hospital room in November 1968 following Ono's first miscarriage.)

McCartney was followed by two sequels, McCartney II (released in 1980), and McCartney III (released in December 2020), both sharing the same recording technique as this album.

== Critical reception ==
=== Contemporary reviews ===
On release, McCartney was widely criticised for being under-produced and for its unfinished songs. In addition, according to Nicholas Schaffner in his 1978 book The Beatles Forever, McCartney's attempt to use the Beatles' break-up to promote his solo album, while presenting himself as a happy family man, "apparently backfired", since "many observers found the whole thing contrived, tasteless, and rather vicious." Madinger and Easter write of the album receiving a "critical lambasting" and that the "general sentiment" among reviewers was "something to the effect of 'He broke up the Beatles for this?!?'" Richard Williams of Melody Maker suggested that "With this record, [McCartney's] debt to George Martin becomes increasingly clear ..." Williams found "sheer banality" in all the tracks save for "Maybe I'm Amazed" and described "Man We Was Lonely" as "the worst example of his music-hall side".

In a favourable assessment, for the NME, Alan Smith wrote that while on first listen he found McCartney "too harmlessly mild", his view had changed with time, such that: "Listening to it is like hearing a man's personal contentment committed to the sound of music. Most of the sounds, effects and ideas are sheer brilliance; much of the aura is of quiet songs on a hot summer night; and virtually all of the tracks reflect a kind of intangible roundness. 'Excitement' is not a word to use for this album ... 'warmth' and 'happiness' are." In his combined review of all the former Beatles' 1970 solo releases, Geoffrey Cannon of The Guardian dismissed it as an album that had "no substance". Cannon continued: "Paul reveals himself in it as a man preoccupied with himself, and his own situation. The music is boastfully casual ... He seems to believe that anything that comes into his head is worth having. And he's wrong." John Gabree of High Fidelity magazine similarly bemoaned the expectation that "we should dig his every little noise" and found the reasons for the album's failure evident in the Let It Be film, where McCartney appeared to be "the only Beatle who has stagnated as a human being", as well as "incredibly arrogant" in his treatment of his bandmates. Gabree added that "Perhaps the greatest disappointment lies in the songs, although most of them could have been saved by better performances, especially the instrumentals." In The Minnesota Star Tribune, Marshall Fine found the album "musically solid but lacks substance".

Writing for Rolling Stone, Langdon Winner found the songs "distinctly second rate" relative to McCartney's best compositions as a Beatle, with only "Maybe I'm Amazed" "even com[ing] close" to matching that high standard, but he admired McCartney's vocals and added: "if one can accept the album in its own terms, McCartney stands as a very good, although not astounding, piece of work." Winner admitted to being repelled by the "tawdry propaganda" surrounding the release, however, about which he emphasised: "Remember, this is all stuff that Paul himself deliberately included [in the album's press kit], not just some idle comments he let slip to a probing journalist." (Note: According to author Michael Frontani, Winner rewrote his original, more favourable assessment of McCartney, following Jann Wenner's instructions that he address the issue of McCartney's controversial promotion for the album.) The reviewer concluded: "I like McCartney very much. But I remember that the people of Troy also liked that wooden horse they wheeled through their gates until they discovered that it was hollow inside and full of hostile warriors."

=== Retrospective assessments ===
Professional ratings
Review scores
Source	Rating
AllMusic	4/5 stars
The A.V. Club	B
Blender	4/5 stars
Christgau's Record Guide	B
Consequence of Sound	4/5 stars
Encyclopedia of Popular Music	3/5 stars
MusicHound	3.5/5
Pitchfork	7.9/10
Record Collector	3/5 stars
The Rolling Stone Album Guide	2.5/5 stars

In the 2004 edition of The Rolling Stone Album Guide, Greg Kot deems the album "so modest it barely registers" in comparison with Lennon's Plastic Ono Band, adding: "Only the white soul of 'Maybe I'm Amazed' distinguishes otherwise unbearably slight confections such as 'Lovely Linda.'" Stephen Thomas Erlewine of AllMusic writes that McCartney possesses "an endearingly ragged, homemade quality", with "That Would Be Something", "Every Night", "Teddy Boy" and "Maybe I'm Amazed" all "full-fledged McCartney classics". Although he notes that "the throwaway nature of much of the material ... has become charming in retrospect", Erlewine adds: "Unfortunately, in retrospect it also appears as a harbinger of the nagging mediocrity that would plague McCartney's entire solo career." Record Collector has highlighted "Every Night", "Junk" and "Maybe I'm Amazed" as songs that "still sound absolutely effortless and demonstrate the man's natural genius with a melody".

Among Beatle biographers, Robert Rodriguez includes McCartney in his chapter covering the worst solo albums issued by the former band members between 1970 and 1980, saying: "For anyone wanting to get to the root of the most common rap against Paul's solo output, look no further ..." While bemoaning the lack of quality control that allowed "charmless ditties" such as "Teddy Boy" to go under-developed, Rodriguez writes: "What made McCartney so frustrating a listen was not the absence of compelling musical ideas; it was the abundance of them. Had melodies like 'Momma Miss America' been teased out into compositions with a beginning, middle, end, and point, McCartney could have ended up as highly regarded in its own way as Plastic Ono Band: a full slate of focused, listener-friendly pop confections that might very well have given fans far less cause for bitterness at the Beatles' breakup."

In 1999, Neil Young inducted McCartney into the Rock and Roll Hall of Fame and praised McCartney, saying: "I loved that record because it was so simple. And there was so much to see and to hear. It was just Paul. There was no adornment at all ... There was no attempt made to compete with the things he had already done. And so out he stepped from the shadow of the Beatles." McCartney subsequently told Rolling Stone that, given the album's homemade qualities, he considered it to be rock music's first indie album, adding: "Y'know, it's now what would be called an 'indie' thing. To me, then, it was just ... knockin' around experimentin' with some sounds and not worrying how it was gonna turn out. I think that was one of the secrets." Citing its home recording and mixing, Brent Day of Paste felt that McCartney was arguably "one of the first big lo-fi records of its day." It was one of McCartney's two post-Beatle albums that was included in 1001 Albums You Must Hear Before You Die.

== Reissues ==
McCartney was released on CD on 7 June 1993, along with six other studio albums McCartney made during the 1970s, including Ram (with Linda) and Band on the Run (with their band Wings).

On 13 June 2011, the album and McCartney's second official solo work, McCartney II, were reissued together by Hear Music/Concord Music Group as part of The Paul McCartney Archive Collection. The album re-entered the charts in the UK, the Netherlands, France and Japan. On 17 November 2017, McCartney was re-released by Capitol/UMe without bonus tracks as part of McCartney's 2016 return to Capitol Records and a catalogue service agreement taking over from Concord Records and Hear Music.

McCartney received a special 50th-anniversary release in a limited-edition half-speed mastered vinyl pressing for Record Store Day on 26 September 2020.

The album was reissued on 5 August 2022 in a boxset entitled McCartney I II III, consisting of 3 LPs or 3 CDs, along with the second and third albums of the trilogy.

== Track listing ==
All songs written by Paul McCartney.

Side one

1. "The Lovely Linda" – 0:43
2. "That Would Be Something" – 2:38
3. "Valentine Day" – 1:39
4. "Every Night" – 2:31
5. "Hot as Sun/Glasses" – 2:07
6. "Junk" – 1:54
7. "Man We Was Lonely" – 2:56

Side two

1. "Oo You" – 2:48
2. "Momma Miss America" – 4:04
3. "Teddy Boy" – 2:22
4. "Singalong Junk" – 2:34
5. "Maybe I'm Amazed" – 3:53
6. "Kreen-Akrore" – 4:15

== Archive Collection reissue ==
For its June 2011 reissue, McCartney was released in multiple formats:

- Standard edition 1-CD; the original 13-track album
- Special edition 2-CD; the original 13-track album on the first disc, plus seven bonus tracks on a second disc
- Deluxe edition 2-CD/1-DVD; the original 13-track album, the bonus tracks disc, a 128-page hardcover book with unpublished photos and liner notes
- Remastered vinyl 2-LP version containing the special edition and a download link to the material

Disc 1 – the original album The original 13-track album.

Disc 2 – bonus tracks All tracks are previously unreleased.

1. "Suicide" (outtake) – 2:48
2. "Maybe I'm Amazed" (from One Hand Clapping, 1974) – 4:53
3. "Every Night" (live at Glasgow, 1979) – 4:30
4. "Hot as Sun" (live at Glasgow, 1979) – 2:27
5. "Maybe I'm Amazed" (live at Glasgow, 17 December 1979) – 5:11
6. "Don't Cry Baby" (outtake) – 3:07
7. "Women Kind" (mono demo) – 2:09

Note: Tracks 2–4 performed by Paul McCartney and Wings.

Disc 3 – DVD

1. "The Album Story"
2. "The Beach"
3. "Maybe I'm Amazed" (music video)
4. "Suicide" (from One Hand Clapping, 1974)
5. "Every Night" (live at the Concert for the People of Kampuchea, 1979)
6. "Hot as Sun" (live at the Concert for the People of Kampuchea, 1979)
7. "Junk" (MTV Unplugged, 1991)
8. "That Would Be Something" (MTV Unplugged, 1991)

== Personnel ==
According to author Bruce Spizer:

- Paul McCartney – vocals, acoustic & electric guitar, bass guitar, drums, piano, organ, percussion, wineglasses, Mellotron, effects
- Linda McCartney – harmony vocals

== Charts ==
Weekly charts

Chart (1970–71)	Peak position
Australian Kent Music Report	3
Canadian RPM Albums Chart	1
Dutch Mega Albums Chart	3
French SNEP Albums Chart	4
Japanese Oricon LPs Chart	13
Norwegian VG-lista Albums Chart	2
Spanish Albums Chart	4
Swedish Kvällstoppen Albums Chart	2
UK Albums Chart	2
US Billboard Top LPs	1
West German Media Control Albums Chart	15

Chart (2011)	Peak position
Dutch Albums Chart	85
French Albums Chart	91
Japanese Albums Chart	27
Spanish Albums Chart	74
UK Albums Chart	88
US Billboard 200	50
US Top Pop Catalog Albums	7

Year-end charts

Chart (1970)	Position
Australian Albums Chart	17
French Albums Chart	11
UK Albums Chart	10
US Billboard Year-End	25

== Certifications ==
Region	Certification	Certified units/sales
Canada (Music Canada)	Platinum	100,000^{^}
United States (RIAA)	2× Platinum	2,000,000^{^}
^{^} Shipments figures based on certification alone.

== Sources ==
- Badman, Keith (2001). The Beatles Diary Volume 2: After the Break-Up 1970–2001. London: Omnibus Press. ISBN 978-0-7119-8307-6.
- The Beatles (2000). The Beatles Anthology. San Francisco, CA: Chronicle Books. ISBN 0-8118-2684-8.
- Blake, John (1981). All You Needed Was Love: The Beatles After the Beatles. Middlesex: Hamlyn Paperbacks. ISBN 0-600-20466-9.
- Brown, Peter; Gaines, Steven (2002) [1983]. The Love You Make: An Insider's Story of the Beatles. New York, NY: New American Library. ISBN 978-0-4512-0735-7.
- Carlin, Peter Ames (2009). Paul McCartney: A Life. New York, NY: Touchstone/Simon & Schuster. ISBN 978-1-4165-6223-8.
- Carr, Roy; Tyler, Tony (1978). The Beatles: An Illustrated Record. London: Trewin Copplestone Publishing. ISBN 0-450-04170-0.
- Castleman, Harry; Podrazik, Walter J. (1976). All Together Now: The First Complete Beatles Discography 1961–1975. New York, NY: Ballantine Books. ISBN 0-345-25680-8.
- Christgau, Robert (1981). Christgau's Record Guide: Rock Albums of the '70s. Boston, MA: Da Capo Press. ISBN 0-306-80409-3.
- Clayson, Alan (2003). Ringo Starr. London: Sanctuary. ISBN 1-86074-488-5.
- Doggett, Peter (2011). You Never Give Me Your Money: The Beatles After the Breakup. New York, NY: It Books. ISBN 978-0-06-177418-8.
- Frontani, Michael (2009). "The Solo Years". In Womack, Kenneth (ed.). The Cambridge Companion to the Beatles. Cambridge, UK: Cambridge University Press. ISBN 978-1-1398-2806-2.
- Goodman, Fred (2015). Allen Klein: The Man Who Bailed Out the Beatles, Made the Stones, and Transformed Rock & Roll. New York, NY: Houghton Mifflin Harcourt. ISBN 978-0-547-89686-1.
- Graff, Gary; Durchholz, Daniel, eds. (1999). MusicHound Rock: The Essential Album Guide. Farmington Hills, MI: Visible Ink Press. ISBN 1-57859-061-2.
- Hertsgaard, Mark (1996). A Day in the Life: The Music and Artistry of the Beatles. London: Pan Books. ISBN 0-330-33891-9.
- Hunt, Chris (ed.) (2005). NME Originals: Beatles – The Solo Years 1970–1980. London: IPC Ignite!.
- Kozinn, Allan; Sinclair, Adrian (2022). The McCartney Legacy Volume 1: 1969-73 (1st ed.). New York: HarperCollins. ISBN 978-0-063-00072-8.
- Larkin, Colin (2006). The Encyclopedia of Popular Music (4th ed.). New York, NY: Oxford University Press. ISBN 0-19-531373-9.
- MacDonald, Ian (1998). Revolution in the Head: The Beatles' Records and the Sixties. London: Pimlico. ISBN 0-7126-6697-4.
- Madinger, Chip; Easter, Mark (2000). Eight Arms to Hold You: The Solo Beatles Compendium. Chesterfield, MO: 44.1 Productions. ISBN 0-615-11724-4.
- Miles, Barry (1998). Paul McCartney: Many Years from Now. London: Secker & Warburg. ISBN 978-0-436-28022-1.
- Miles, Barry (2001). The Beatles Diary Volume 1: The Beatles Years. London: Omnibus Press. ISBN 0-7119-8308-9.
- Mojo: The Beatles' Final Years Special Edition. London: Emap. 2003.
- The New Rolling Stone Encyclopedia of Rock & Roll. New York, NY: Fireside/Rolling Stone Press. 1995. ISBN 0-684-81044-1.
- Norman, Philip (2008). John Lennon: The Life. New York, NY: Ecco. ISBN 978-0-06-075402-0.
- Norman, Philip (2016). Paul McCartney: The Life. New York, NY: Little, Brown and Company. ISBN 978-0-316-32796-1.
- Perasi, Luca (2013). Paul McCartney: Recording Sessions (1969–2013). L.I.L.Y. Publishing. ISBN 978-88-909122-1-4.
- Rodriguez, Robert (2010). Fab Four FAQ 2.0: The Beatles' Solo Years, 1970–1980. Milwaukee, WI: Backbeat Books. ISBN 978-1-4165-9093-4.
- Schaffner, Nicholas (1978). The Beatles Forever. New York, NY: McGraw-Hill. ISBN 0-07-055087-5.
- Sounes, Howard (2010). Fab: An Intimate Life of Paul McCartney. London: HarperCollins. ISBN 978-0-00-723705-0.
- Spizer, Bruce (2005). The Beatles Solo on Apple Records. New Orleans, LA: 498 Productions. ISBN 0-9662649-5-9.
- Sulpy, Doug; Schweighardt, Ray (1997). Get Back: The Unauthorized Chronicle of The Beatles' Let It Be Disaster. New York, NY: St. Martin's Griffin. ISBN 0-312-19981-3.
- Winn, John C. (2009). That Magic Feeling: The Beatles' Recorded Legacy, Volume Two, 1966–1970. New York, NY: Three Rivers Press. ISBN 978-0-307-45239-9.
- Woffinden, Bob (1981). The Beatles Apart. London: Proteus. ISBN 0-906071-89-5.
