= Every Night (Paul McCartney song) =

1970 Paul McCartney song

- 1981 live promotional single version from Concert for Kampuchea

Song by Paul McCartney

from the album McCartney
- Released: 17 April 1970
- Recorded: 22 February 1970
- Studio: EMI, London
- Genre: Folk Rock
- Length: 2:30
- Label: Apple
- Songwriter(s): Paul McCartney
- Producer(s): Paul McCartney

"Every Night" is a song by the English musician Paul McCartney, released on his debut solo album McCartney in April 1970. He wrote the song while he was on holiday in Greece, and recorded it at EMI Studios in London on 22 February 1970. McCartney first performed it live on 23 November 1979 in Liverpool.

== Lyrics and music ==
The lyrics of "Every Night" reflect the difficult situation McCartney was dealing with at the time the song was written, which was in light of the imminent break-up of the Beatles; the words do, however, convey some optimism for the future.

According to James McGrath, the last line, "But tonight I just wanna stay in / And be with you," is the key to the song, in that it "quietly challenges the uneasy relationship between rock and domesticity." McGrath points out that Bob Dylan's song from the previous year, "Tonight I'll Be Staying Here with You," ended on a similar note. The vocalised bridge begins with the same melody that begins McCartney's Beatles song, "You Never Give Me Your Money".

"The structure of 'Every Night' is different from many McCartney songs [as rather than] a true chorus, the vocal refrain of 'every night' occurs at the beginning of each verse. The repeated section, which could be nominally classed as [the] chorus, [comprises] 'oo' vocalisations."

== Origin ==
Paul McCartney would recall having come up with the first two lines of "Every Night" in the mid-1960s, but the song only began to develop during the January 1969 Twickenham Studios sessions for the Beatles' Get Back/Let It Be: specifically on 21 and 24 January 1969 McCartney and his bandmates jammed around McCartney's initial musical idea, giving the song a brief run through with John Lennon on slide guitar. McCartney completed the song while in the Corfiot village of Benitses where he and his wife Linda McCartney vacationed in May–June 1969, along with McCartney's stepdaughter Heather McCartney.

== Later release ==
"Every Night" is also included on:

- The live albums Concerts for the People of Kampuchea (1981), Unplugged (The Official Bootleg) (1991),Back in the U.S. (2002) and Back in the World Live (2003).
- The compilation albums Wingspan: Hits and History (2001) and Pure McCartney (4-CD edition) (2016)

== Personnel ==
According to author John C. Winn, except where noted:

- Paul McCartney – lead vocal, three acoustic guitars, electric guitar, bass guitar, drums

== Other versions ==
"Every Night"

Single by Phoebe Snow

from the album Against the Grain
- B-side: "Random Time" "Keep a Watch on the Shoreline" (UK)
- Released: November 1978
- Recorded: 1978
- Studio: A&R Recording (NYC)
- Genre: Rock
- Length: 3:32
- Label: Columbia
- Songwriter(s): Paul McCartney
- Producer(s): Phil Ramone, Barry Beckett

Phoebe Snow singles chronology
"Reelin'" (Garland Jeffreys duet) (1978)	"Every Night" (1978)	"Sometimes Love Forgets" (Steve Goodman duet) (1980)

Billy Joe Royal had an August 1970 single release of "Every Night": notable as the first release recorded at Studio One in Doraville, the single failed to become a major hit peaking in the Bubbling Under Hot 100 chart in Billboard at #113.

Phoebe Snow recorded "Every Night" for her 1978 album Against the Grain, an album Snow would recall as a "disaster [that] tried to be a rock album but had too many opinions. Everybody who played, sang or cleaned up the studio produced that album", adding that "putting 'Every Night' was the one idea of mine that filtered through." Released as the album's lead single in November 1978, "Every Night" failed to become a major U.S. hit despite garnering sufficient attention to rank on the Singles Chart 101–150 in Record World for twelve weeks rising as high as #129 "Every Night" would become Snow's only charting single in the UK with a #37 peak and also her only major hit in Australia reaching #22 on the AR1A singles chart. In New Zealand "Every Night" would chart as high as #6 matching Snow's previous NZ chart best: her 1977 single "Shakey Ground".

"Every Night" has also been covered by Odetta (on her 1970 album Odetta Sings), Claudine Longet (on her 1972 album Let's Spend the Night Together), Richie Havens (on his 1980 album Connections), The 5th Dimension on their 1971 album Love's Lines, Angles and Rhymes and Carry The Zero (on the 2009 McCartney tribute album Looking for Change). In 2014 Jamie Cullum covered the song on The Art of McCartney covers album., The Drifters (on the 1972 atlantic/bell compilation 24 original hits from 1975 and LP THE DRIFTERS NOW)
