= George Harrison's house =

George Harrison's house may refer to:

- 12 Arnold Grove, the birthplace and early childhood home of George Harrison in Liverpool, England
- Kinfauns, in Esher, Surrey, where Harrison lived from 1964 to 1970
- Friar Park in Henley-on-Thames, where Harrison lived from 1970 until his death in 2001

== See also ==
- John Lennon's house (disambiguation)
