= Maureen Starkey Tigrett =

First wife of Ringo Starr (1946–1994)

- Cox in 1968
- Born: Mary Cox; 4 August 1946; Liverpool, England
- Died: 30 December 1994 (aged 48); Seattle, Washington, US
- Other name: Mo Starkey
- Occupation: Hairdresser
- Spouses: Ringo Starr (m. 1965; div. 1975); Isaac Tigrett (m. 1989)
- Children: 4, including Zak Starkey

Maureen Starkey Tigrett (born Mary Cox; 4 August 1946 – 30 December 1994), also known as Mo Starkey, was a hairdresser from Liverpool, England, best known as the first wife of Ringo Starr, the Beatles' drummer. When she was a trainee hairdresser in Liverpool, she met him at the Cavern Club, where the Beatles were performing. Starr proposed marriage at the Ad Lib Club in London on 20 January 1965. They married at the Caxton Hall Register Office in London that same year but they divorced in 1975.

The Starkeys first lived at 34 Montagu Square, Marylebone, then bought Sunny Heights, in St George's Hill, Weybridge. In 1973, they bought Tittenhurst Park from John Lennon. They had three children together: sons Zak and Jason, and daughter Lee.

== Early life ==
Mary Cox was born on 4 August 1946, in Liverpool, Lancashire, (now Merseyside), England. She was the only child of Florence Cox (née Barrett) and Joseph Cox, a ship's steward. As a teenager, she remembered turning her school uniform around to make it look like a frock, and paying a school friend ten cigarettes a day to teach her how to "smoke properly". She left convent school at 14, began her career as a trainee manicurist/hairdresser at Ashley du Pre, in Liverpool, and changed her name to Maureen but was known as "Mo" to her friends.

== Ringo Starr ==
At 15, Cox became a regular at the Cavern Club, and remembered the long queues and violent competition for access to the Beatles. Although Ringo, whom she called "Ritchie" (for Richard), kissed her, he did not immediately notice her among his numerous fans. All the Beatles were supposed to be officially unattached, for image purposes, and when Ringo started dating Cox in 1962, she was often threatened, and once scratched in the face by a rival. She even had to stop working as a hairdresser because of the threats. In September 1963, with her parents' permission, she travelled to Greece with Starr, Paul McCartney, and Jane Asher.

On the eve of an international tour, Starr collapsed during a photo session at a studio in Barnes, London. Stricken with a 102 °F (39 °C) fever and tonsillitis, he was rushed to hospital, where Cox visited every day to help him recuperate. Afterwards, they became a monogamous couple. On 20 January 1965, Starr proposed marriage to Cox at the Ad Lib Club, above the Prince Charles Theatre, London.

=== Marriage ===
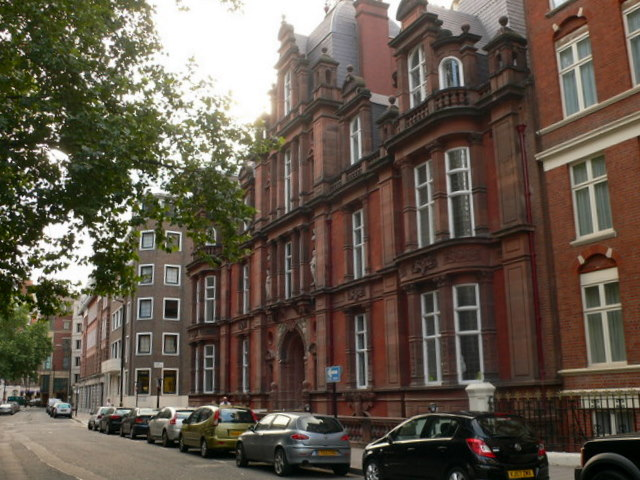
Caxton Hall, London, where the Starkeys were married

After finding out that she was pregnant in late January 1965, 18-year-old Maureen married Starr at the Caxton Hall registry office in London on 11 February 1965.

Because of the pregnancy, the Beatles' manager Brian Epstein arranged the wedding very quickly, hoping it would be private, with John Lennon telling her there should be no tears, or she 'wouldn't be one of the gang'. McCartney was in Tunisia at the time and could not attend. After the wedding, George Harrison (who had arrived on a bicycle) jokingly said "Two down, two to go", meaning that the only two Beatles who were not married were Harrison and McCartney. The Starrs had a brief honeymoon for three days at the holiday home of Epstein's lawyer, David Jacobs, in Prince's Crescent, Hove, but gave an interview in the back garden on their wedding day, as they were being besieged by numerous reporters, with 100 photographers. Starr then had to depart for the Bahamas for the filming of Help!, on 22 February. She made it clear from the start that she would not give interviews, as a Beatles spokesperson explained: "She doesn't want to get mixed up in publicity, and Ringo doesn't want her to, either."

The Starkeys were living at 34 Montagu Square, Marylebone, when Epstein's accountant suggested that the group members should move to houses near his, in Esher. Lennon bought a house called Kenwood in St George's Hill, Weybridge, Harrison bought Kinfauns on a nearby estate in Esher, and on 24 July 1965, the Starrs bought Sunny Heights, on South Road, St George's Hill, for £30,000. Ken Partridge was asked to redesign the interior of the six-bedroom house, incorporating a private pub above the garage, called The Flying Cow, which had a mirrored bar, pool table, jukebox, and a portrait of Lennon and McCartney on the wall. A TV was usually turned on in every room, and a go-kart track was laid in the grounds. Although Cox cooked for the family, the Starkeys had a nanny who lived in the house, and a cleaning woman who visited every day.

After Lennon moved away, the Starkeys sold Sunny Heights for £50,000 and bought a 16th-century mansion in Elstead, from Peter Sellers, which they soon sold to Stephen Stills, before moving into Roundhill, on Compton Avenue, Highgate, London, on 25 April 1969. They bought Lennon's home at Tittenhurst Park on 18 September 1973.

Cox enjoyed the closeness of Cynthia Lennon and Pattie Boyd, as they often went on holiday, shopped, and celebrated Christmas together. Starr promised that he would set up a nationwide hairdressing business for his wife, but the idea was later shelved, as she had to deal with caring for their children and being the wife of a Beatle. This would entail waiting with other Beatles' partners, at clubs like the Speakeasy Club, the Ad Lib, or the Scotch of St. James, or staying up all night, waiting with a cooked meal for Starr when he came home after a recording session. She was also asked to look after voluminous fan club mail and would personally answer letters. The Starrs were both interested in various arts, and collaborated on photo montages, paintings and simple sculptures together.

On 19 February 1968, the Starkeys travelled to Rishikesh, India, with McCartney and Asher. They joined the Lennons and the Harrisons, who had arrived three days earlier. Maureen took an instant dislike to the spiders, mosquitoes, and flies that were ever-present in the ashram. The division between the sexes was emphasised by the male musicians sitting outside at night composing songs, while their partners would gather together in one of their rooms, often talking about life as the wife or partner of a Beatle. The Starkeys left India on 1 March, saying the unfamiliar food was not to their liking, and they were missing their children.

Maureen Starkey sang backup vocals on "The Continuing Story of Bungalow Bill" (from The White Album) and was, along with Yoko Ono and Linda McCartney, in attendance at the Apple Corps' rooftop concert in 1969, which was filmed for Let It Be, showing her sitting next to the chimney stack with Ono to keep warm. Responding to applause, McCartney can be heard saying "Thanks, Mo" after the final performance of "Get Back" on the album Let It Be.

=== Frank Sinatra's birthday song ===
The first song in the Apple Records catalogue was a private recording by Frank Sinatra. In 1968, as a favour to Starr, Sinatra recorded this special version of his previously released song "The Lady Is a Tramp" for Maureen's birthday. Sammy Cahn rewrote the lyrics, and personalised them: "She married Ringo, and she could have had Paul/That's why the lady is a champ". Sinatra's recording was pressed as a single in Los Angeles and notated as Apple 1. Starr presented his wife with the single on her 22nd birthday, 4 August 1968. Only a few copies were pressed before the master tape was destroyed; the song is still in demand by record collectors. A poor quality copy of the song began circulating in collector circles, and is now available on several bootleg albums. Starr and his wife attended a Sinatra concert in London on 8 May 1970.

=== Children ===
Zak Starkey was born on 13 September 1965, at Queen Charlotte's and Chelsea Hospital, the same day as the single "Yesterday" was released in the US. She said at the time: "I'd like the baby to be like Ringo, but he need not necessarily follow in his father's footsteps." Starr said his son was "a little smasher", but also said that "I won't let Zak be a drummer." She did not get her wish, as his son later went on to play with the Who and Oasis. Jason Starkey was born on 19 August 1967, and daughter Lee Parkin Starkey was born on 11 November 1970, both at Queen Charlotte and Chelsea Hospital in Hammersmith, London.

=== Marital problems and divorce ===
When the Beatles broke up in 1970, so did the Starkeys' marriage, as Ringo's infidelities were becoming more frequent, and his alcoholism was escalating. Ringo’s heavy drinking resulted in him sometimes hitting Maureen. Her depression and disappointment in this regard led her to have an affair with George Harrison. George’s wife, Patti, one day found them in bed together in their home, after suspecting that there was something going on between her husband and her good friend. She told George that in all fairness Ringo needed to be told what was happening. When the Harrisons were visiting the Starkeys, Harrison confessed to Ringo that he was in love with Maureen, and telling of the affair was inevitable.. Ringo, dumbfounded, replied that at least it was someone that they knew and loved. However, it led to much tension in the Starkey marriage, as Ringo was very angry. John Lennon was equally angry with Harrison, describing the affair as being "virtual incest".

Despite the couple's problems, notwithstanding extramarital affairs, Maureen did not want to divorce Starr, but eventually, on 17 July 1975, their divorce was finalised on the grounds of Starr's affair with American fashion model Nancy Lee Andrews. Starr agreed to give his ex-wife custody of their children and a one-off payment of £125,000, along with £23,000 a year plus £2,500 a year for each of their children. The end of her marriage depressed her deeply; she once rode a motorbike into a brick wall in a suicide attempt.

In November 1987, Maureen Starkey instructed her counsel, Thayne Forbes QC, to sue Withers LLP, the London firm of solicitors that had handled her divorce settlement, for an alleged "breach of contract and negligence", saying that a partner, Charles Doughty, had not fully investigated Starr's finances at the time and had not given enough consideration to the settlement amount and her personal needs. She was present for every day of the three-week court case, and when called to give evidence, she referred to herself as "thick as two short planks", and Starr as being a "sodding great Andy Capp" (a womanising, drunk cartoon character). Finding in favour of Doughty and Withers, Mr Justice Bush said that Starr was "a generous man" as he had increased her yearly payments twice since their divorce. He ordered her to pay the whole bill for the case, estimated to be over £200,000.

== Later life and death ==
In 1976, Maureen started to live with Isaac Tigrett, best known as one of the founders of the Hard Rock Cafe and the House of Blues. They were married in Monaco on 27 May 1989. Tigrett, known for collecting memorabilia, once said that Maureen was his "ultimate collectable". During her relationship and marriage to Tigrett, she often used the phrase, "Just give me furs, jewels and property, thank you." They had one daughter together, Augusta King Tigrett, born on 4 January 1987 in Dallas, Texas.

Maureen attended the funeral of drummer Keith Moon on 13 September 1978, at the Golders Green Crematorium, along with 120 guests, including Eric Clapton, Bill Wyman and Charlie Watts.

On 8 December 1980, Lennon's ex-wife Cynthia Lennon was staying at Maureen's home in London when Maureen received a phone call from Starr after Lennon had been murdered in New York City.

Maureen and Starr became grandparents when Tatia Jayne Starkey was born on 7 September 1985, to their eldest son, Zak, and his wife, Sarah Starkey (née Menikides), in England.

Maureen died at age 48 on 30 December 1994, from complications from leukemia following unsuccessful treatment at the Fred Hutchinson Cancer Center in Seattle, Washington. She had received bone marrow from her son, Zak, who then donated blood platelets and white blood cells. Maureen's four children, her 82-year-old mother, husband Tigrett, and ex-husband Starr were all at her bedside when she died. Following her death, Paul McCartney wrote the song "Little Willow", which appears on his tenth solo studio album, Flaming Pie (1997), in her memory and with a dedication to her children.

== In popular culture ==
Maureen will be portrayed by actress Mia McKenna-Bruce in the upcoming The Beatles — A Four-Film Cinematic Event by Sam Mendes. The films are expected to be released in April 2028.
