= John Lennon's house =

John Lennon's house may refer to:

- 251 Menlove Avenue or Mendips, the childhood home of John Lennon in Liverpool, England
- Kenwood, St George's Hill, in Weybridge, Surrey, where Lennon lived from 1964 to 1968
- Tittenhurst Park in Sunningdale, Berkshire, where Lennon lived from 1969 to 1971

== See also ==
- The Dakota, an apartment building in New York City, US, where Lennon lived from 1973 until his murder in 1980
- George Harrison's house (disambiguation)
