= Unfinished Music No. 2: Life with the Lions =

Studio album by John Lennon and Yoko Ono
- Released: 9 May 1969
- Recorded: 4–25 November 1968, 2 March 1969
- Venues: Lady Mitchell Hall, Cambridge University, Cambridge
- Studios: Room 1, Second West Ward, Queen Charlotte's Hospital, London
- Genres: Avant-garde; sound collage; musique concrète; noise
- Length: 50:56
- Label: Zapple
- Producers: John Lennon, Yoko Ono

John Lennon and Yoko Ono chronology
Unfinished Music No. 1: Two Virgins (1968)	Unfinished Music No. 2: Life with the Lions (1969)	Wedding Album (1969)

Unfinished Music No. 2: Life with the Lions is the second of three collaborative experimental albums of avant-garde music by John Lennon and Yoko Ono, released in May 1969 on Zapple, a sub label of Apple. It was a successor to 1968's highly controversial Unfinished Music No. 1: Two Virgins, and was followed by the Wedding Album. The album peaked in the United States at number 174, 50 places lower than the previous album. The album, whose title is a play on words of the BBC Radio show Life with The Lyons, was recorded at Queen Charlotte's Hospital in London and live at Cambridge University, in November 1968 and March 1969, respectively. The Cambridge performance, to which Ono had been invited and to which she brought Lennon, was Lennon and Ono's second as a couple. A few of the album's tracks were previewed by the public, thanks to Aspen magazine. The album was remastered in 1997.

== Background ==
Beatle John Lennon and Yoko Ono's "Unfinished Music" series was an attempt by Lennon and Ono to make a record of their life together. With Ono's Grapefruit in mind, Lennon and Ono imagined that the sound wasn't printed into the vinyl's grooves, but was meant to be thought of by the listener's mind. Lennon described "Unfinished Music" as "saying whatever you want it to say. It is just us expressing ourselves like a child does, you know, however he feels like then. What we're saying is make your own music. This is Unfinished Music." A few of the tracks that ended up on the album were released as a mono 8" square flexi record that was given away with copies of the American magazine Aspen. The record, which featured mostly Ono on the first side, with Lennon contributing the whole second side as one track, edited by Mario Amaya, (Note: All by Ono, except where noted. Side one: "Song for John"/"Let's Go on Flying"/"Snow Is Falling All the Time", "Mum's Only Looking for Her Hand in the Snow", "No Bed for Beatle John" (Ono and Lennon). Side two: "Radio Play" (Lennon).) was recorded at Queen Charlotte's Hospital. Before Lennon and Ono were together as a couple, Ono was asked to perform at a free jazz concert in Lady Mitchell Hall at Cambridge University, by organiser Anthony Barnett. (Note: The concert came about as Barnett "wanted to put on a concert of new, improvised music".) Ono, who was going to cancel her performance, was persuaded by Lennon to perform. Lennon and Ono had their first performance together for The Rolling Stones' Rock and Roll Circus film, where they were part of the band The Dirty Mac.

== Recording and content ==
Fluxus art concepts and practices were used for the album. The album opens with an improvised recording titled "Cambridge 1969", (Note: With Ono, The Flaming Lips made a remix of "Cambridge 1969", re-titled "Cambridge 1969/2007", that was included on the album Yes, I'm a Witch.) recorded on 2 March 1969 at Cambridge University, before a live audience, which became Lennon and Ono's second performance together, but their first released performance (Note: The Rolling Stones' Rock and Roll Circus would be shelved until 1996.) and the first performance by a Beatle without the rest of the band since their main line-up's formation. The piece takes up all of side one and consists of Ono's vocalisations and screaming accompanied by loud, brash and distorted electric guitar feedback from Lennon. Saxophonist John Tchicai and percussionist John Stevens join Ono and Lennon near the end of the piece. Throughout the performance, Lennon kept his back to the audience. The original version of the piece was longer. In a 2010 interview with Cambridge News, Tchicai said that the concert was split in two: the first set was Lennon and Ono, and the other consisted of jazz improvisation players. Recalled Tchicai, Lennon and Ono said to the players: "If you would like to join us for some improvisation, please do." Barnett said that Lennon had been "trying to show off and be more avant-garde than anyone in avant-garde music".

Side two of the album was recorded on a cassette tape in their suite at Queen Charlotte's Hospital in London. "No Bed for Beatle John" consists of Lennon and Ono singing the text of press clippings about themselves, including reports of the hospital not giving Lennon a bed to stay in during Ono's miscarriage, and EMI refusing to carry Unfinished Music No.1: Two Virgins because of its controversial sleeve, in a cappella chant style. (Note: Lennon would employ a similar style to a song in a Bob Dylan-like voice, in November 1978, known as "News of the Day (From Reuters)".) "Baby's Heartbeat" is a looped infant mortality recording, made with a Nagra microphone, of John Ono Lennon II's ill-fated actual palpitations. Ono first referenced infant mortality in her book Grapefruit, then in her song "Greenfield Morning I Pushed an Empty Baby Carriage All Over the City" from her album Yoko Ono/Plastic Ono Band. "Two Minutes Silence" follows; made as a tribute to composer John Cage's 4'33" in that, similar to Cage's avant garde composition, though Lennon and Ono's track is completely silent. The album closes with "Radio Play", which includes sounds of a radio with brief moments of Lennon and Ono having a conversation and Lennon making a phone call in the background. An edited version of this recording was released on the flexi record that was given away with Aspen.

"Song for John", one of the songs that was included on the flexi record, features a "Dear Prudence"-like chord progression, in a medley with "Let's Go on Flying" and "Snow Is Falling All the Time". It was written by Ono before she had met Lennon. The entire medley was recorded at Queen Charlotte's Hospital. By this time, Ono was looking to sign a record contract, and "Song for John" was going to be part of her first album. Ono commented, "A record company had suggest I do an album of my sort of freak-type freestyle things, one of which was Song For John." Ono wrote the song when "thinking about wanting to meet somebody who could fly with me". Lennon became the first person to hear the demo, so Ono "felt a sentimental reason for the name to be John." Ono later did a re-make of the song for her album Approximately Infinite Universe. "Snow Is Falling All the Time", similar to a nursery rhyme, was re-made as the B-side to "Happy Xmas (War Is Over)", retitled "Listen, the Snow Is Falling". "Mum's Only Looking for Her Hand in the Snow", which features Lennon on acoustic guitar, is an early version of what would become "Don't Worry Kyoko (Mummy's Only Looking for Her Hand in the Snow)". This version was later included on the Rykodisc issue of Lennon and Ono's Wedding Album.

== Release ==
Unfinished Music No.2: Life with the Lions was released on 9 May 1969 in the UK (Note: UK Zapple ZAPPLE 01) and 26 May 1969 in the US, (Note: LP: US Zapple ST 3357; 8-track: 8XT-3357) on the Apple subsidiary label Zapple. While EMI didn't act as distributor for Unfinished Music No.1: Two Virgins, they did for Unfinished Music No.2: Life with the Lions. The album still failed to chart in the UK, but it managed a number 174 peak in the US. The album sold about 60,000 copies in the US, while about 5,000 were sold in the UK. Lennon was disappointed that Apple hadn't given any promotion to the album. The title is both a parody on the name of the BBC radio comedy Life with the Lyons, and a reference to the press, who would follow Lennon and Ono everywhere. The album's original inner sleeve was printed with the song titles and the names of the musicians for each track. The album was released in Japan by Zapple; (Note: Japan Zapple AP-8782) a promo edition of the album was released on red vinyl. A reissue included, instead of the inner sleeve, a four-page sheet with lyrics. (Note: Japan Zapple EAS-80701)

Cover art by Kosh with front cover photo was taken by Susan Wood while Ono was bedridden in Room 1, Second West Ward, at Queen Charlotte's Hospital. The back cover was a news photo of Lennon and Ono leaving Marylebone Police Station on 19 October 1968, after their arrest for hashish possession the previous day, at 34 Montagu Square, Lennon's residence. The arrest later caused problems for Lennon with US immigration authorities. The back cover also carried a "quote" from Beatles producer George Martin: "No comment". The couple followed the album with the Wedding Album in 1969. Unfinished Music No.2: Life with the Lions was reissued through Rykodisc under the observation of Ono, with two bonus tracks, "Song for John" and "Mulberry", on 3 June 1997. (Note: US Rykodisc RCD10412) The album was reissued on LP, CD, and digitally by Secretly Canadian on November 11, 2016 with bonus tracks and rare photos.

== Critical reception ==
Professional ratings
Review scores
Source	Rating
AllMusic	1.5/5 stars
Encyclopedia of Popular Music	1/5 stars
The Great Rock Discography	3/10
MusicHound	woof!
Pitchfork	5.9/10
The Rolling Stone Album Guide	1/5 stars

Contemporaneously, Ed Ward wrote in Rolling Stone that the album was "utter bullshit" and "in poor taste". The Boston Sunday Globe writer Gregory McDonald advised readers not to buy the album, and described "Cambridge 1969" as resembling "a well recorded vocal by a mosquito". Alan Jones of Lincolnshire Echo warned that the album ranged "from Yoko singing their press cuttings in a high cat-like voice to John twiddling the dial on the radio", and did not advise the record for those "on small record-buying budgets." The Sault Star were more favourable, deeming its contents and artwork to "sum up the total of rock as a revolutionary force." In a review for Cambridge Evening News, Douglas Oliver said the Cambridge concert was "strange and chilling. Not in a bad sense, but because there was so much unusual texture. At no time did the music become comforting. It was an extraordinary experience." Record Mirror's reviewer described Life with the Lions as "a fine example of how two young people CAN amuse themselves without television".

In a retrospective review, AllMusic's William Ruhlmann wrote of Lennon and Ono: "If, as they suggested, their lives were their art, then this is, too. Maybe." Seth Colter Walls of Pitchfork deemed the album "less idyllic" than Two Virgins, and wrote that while "Cambridge 1969" does not "create most interest over its 26 minutes", it reveals that Ono's more successful performances work because they typically find her "switching up [her] extreme textures with greater frequency." Uncut reviewer Neil Spencer similarly described the album as the product of "a troubled phase in the couple's lives", but found "Cambridge 1969" was more arresting than the other tracks, noting: "It was Lennon’s first public performance outside The Beatles, and you can sense the relish he took in it." Tom Carson of Entertainment Weekly described the album as a "notoriously oblique" sound collage. Martin C. Strong of The Great Rock Discography said the album continued Lennon and Ono's "anti-commercial, free-form direction, the songs mainly recorded on a small cassette player." while in The Encyclopedia of Popular Music, Colin Larkin said the album saw Lennon continue "his marvellous joke on us".

== Track listing ==
All pieces by John Lennon and Yoko Ono.

Side one

1. "Cambridge 1969" – 26:31

Side two

2. "No Bed for Beatle John" – 4:41
3. "Baby's Heartbeat" – 5:10
4. "Two Minutes Silence" – 2:00
5. "Radio Play" – 12:35

CD bonus tracks

6. "Song for John" – 1:29
7. "Mulberry" – 8:47

== Personnel ==
Track numbering refers to CD and digital releases of the album.

- Yoko Ono – vocals, radio
- John Lennon – vocals, guitar, feedback
- John Tchicai – saxophone (track 1 only)
- John Stevens – percussion (track 1 only)
- Mal Evans – watch (track 1 only)
- John Ono Lennon II – heartbeat (track 3 only)

== Charts ==
Chart (1969)	Peak position	Total weeks
U.S. Billboard 200	174	8
