= Unfinished Music No. 1: Two Virgins =

Studio album by John Lennon and Yoko Ono
- Released: 11 November 1968
- Recorded: 3–4 May 1968 at Kenwood, Surrey
- Genres: Avant-garde; sound collage; musique concrète; noise
- Length: 29:27
- Labels: Apple; Track (UK); Tetragrammaton (US)
- Producers: John Lennon, Yoko Ono

John Lennon and Yoko Ono chronology
Unfinished Music No. 1: Two Virgins (1968)	Unfinished Music No. 2: Life with the Lions (1969)

Alternative cover
- The album as it was sold in stores, with the original cover underneath a brown bag.

Unfinished Music No. 1: Two Virgins is the debut and first of three collaborative experimental albums released by John Lennon and Yoko Ono on Apple Records. It was the result of an all-night session of musical experimentation with Ono in Lennon's home studio at Kenwood, while his wife, Cynthia Lennon, was on holiday in Greece. Lennon and Ono's 1968 debut recording is known not only for its avant-garde content, but also for its cover, which shows the couple naked. This made the album controversial to both the public and the parent record company EMI, which refused to distribute it. In an attempt to avoid controversy, the LP record was sold in a brown paper bag, and distributed by Track and Tetragrammaton in the United Kingdom and the United States respectively. Two Virgins, while failing to chart in the UK, reached number 124 in the US. The album was followed six months later by Unfinished Music No. 2: Life with the Lions.

== Background ==
John Lennon met Yoko Ono in November 1966 at the Indica Gallery in London after he received an invitation from its owner, John Dunbar, to preview an exhibition by an obscure Japanese artist. Lennon described the exhibition as "positive" and kept in touch with Ono. Two years later, Cynthia Lennon, feeling miserable and increasingly distanced from her husband, decided to go on holiday to Greece with her friends Jenny Boyd and Magic Alex. (Note: John told them that if he was not working on a new Beatles album, he would have joined them.) While on his own, Lennon called Ono and invited her over for the night. The genesis of the album came about when Ono expressed an interest in Lennon's avant-garde home recordings, after he had asked "Do you want to hear some of the things I've been playing around at in my studio?" Lennon then played her some of his tapes, which consisted of comedy recordings and electronic sounds, both of which he knew the other Beatles would not allow on their albums. After hearing the tapes, Ono insisted that they make their own recording. Cynthia returned home unexpectedly the next day to find them sitting cross-legged on the floor in matching white robes, staring into each other's eyes.

The Unfinished Music series was an attempt by the pair to keep a record of their life together. With Ono's Grapefruit in mind, they had imagined that the sound was not etched into the vinyl's grooves but was meant to be created by the listener's mind. Lennon described Unfinished Music as "saying whatever you want it to say. It is just us expressing ourselves like a child does, you know, however he feels like then. What we're saying is make your own music. This is Unfinished Music."

== Recording ==
The recordings that ended up on the album consisted largely of tape loops, playing while Lennon tried out different instruments (piano, organ, drums) and sound effects (including reverb, delay and distortion), changed tapes and played other recordings, and conversed with Ono, who vocalised ad-lib in response to the sounds. Both of them had experience in avant-garde music: Ono had staged various multimedia events in New York during the early 1960s, and Lennon had worked on audio experimentation in the Beatles. Lennon's longtime friend Peter Shotton recalled later in his memoir that many of the loops heard on the album were made by Lennon and himself in the days before the recording. Lennon recorded directly to two-track stereophonic, but much of the source material was monophonic. The song "Together", written by George Buddy DeSylva, Lew Brown, and Ray Henderson, can be heard playing in the background.

Shortly after the release of Two Virgins, Lennon stated in an interview that he believed the album "can change people", as others "have changed my head, just with their records." He then claimed "that's what Yoko and my singing is, to change it like that". Lennon talked about making the album and Ono's influence on him, in an interview in 1980 with Playboy's David Sheff: "Well, after Yoko and I met, I didn't realize I was in love with her. I was still thinking it was an artistic collaboration, as it were – producer and artist, right? [...] My ex-wife was away [...] and Yoko came to visit me. [...] instead of making love, we went upstairs and made tapes. I had this room full of different tapes where I would write and make strange loops and things like that for the Beatles' stuff. So we made a tape all night. She was doing her funny voices and I was pushing all different buttons on my tape recorder and getting sound effects. And then as the sun rose we made love and that was Two Virgins." This was Lennon's first recording project that did not feature any help from the other Beatles; parts of the album were reminiscent of later editions of the Beatles' Christmas flexi recordings.

== Cover ==
Lennon and Ono used a time-delay camera, which was set up by Tony Bramwell, to take nude photographs of themselves for the album's cover: these were taken at 34 Montagu Square, in early October 1968. Lennon explained that they "were both a bit embarrassed when we peeled off for the picture, so I took it myself with a delayed action shutter." The front cover showed them frontally nude while the rear cover showed them nude from behind. Lennon's idea was to have the nude shot for the front album cover. Neil Aspinall recalled that Lennon gave the roll of film to an Apple employee called Jeremy, with instructions to develop the photographs. Jeremy claimed that the pictures were "mind-blowing"; Aspinall wryly observed that "Everything was always 'mind-blowing' to Jeremy" and then went on to say "but – just that one time – he was actually right. He couldn't believe it."

The cover provoked an outrage, prompting distributors to sell the album in a plain brown wrapper. Quotes from Genesis 2, chosen by Derek Taylor, were placed on the back of the brown bag. The album's title arose from the couple's feeling that they were "two innocents, lost in a world gone mad", and because after making the recording, the pair consummated their relationship. Lennon said that the cover "just seemed natural for us. We're all naked really." Ono viewed the cover as a significant declaration: "I was in the artistic community, where a painter did a thing about rolling a naked woman with blue paint on her body on a canvas; [...] that was going on at the time. The only difference was that we were going to stand together, which I thought was very interesting [...] it was just standing straight. I liked that concept." The album was regarded by some authorities as being obscene and copies were impounded in several jurisdictions (including 30,000 copies in New Jersey in January 1969). Lennon commented that the uproar seemed to have less to do with the explicit nudity, and more to do with the fact that the pair were rather unattractive; he described it later as a picture of "two slightly overweight ex-junkies".

== Release and aftermath ==
Professional ratings
Review scores
Source	Rating
AllMusic	1.5/5 stars
MusicHound	woof!
The Rolling Stone Album Guide	1.5/5 stars
Pitchfork	6.8/10

Unfinished Music No.1: Two Virgins was released by Apple Records in the US in electronically rechanneled stereo on 11 November 1968, (Note: LP: US Apple T 5001; 8-track: US Apple TNM-85001) and in the UK in mono and electronically rechanneled for stereo on 29 November 1968. (Note: Mono LP: UK Apple APCOR 2; Stereo LP: UK Apple SAPCOR 2) The mono version was available only in the UK by mail order. The album was distributed by Track Records in the UK and Tetragrammaton Records in the US after EMI refused to produce the cover or sleeve to the record, unless it was changed. (Note: EMI's chairman Joseph Lockwood once commented "Why don't you use Paul instead? He's much better looking.") EMI, however, pressed the record in Britain, while the album cover was printed by Technik. Apple employee Jack Oliver got around the sleeve packing problem by hiring several Apple scruffs to package the album into sleeves "in the basement of the old Apple shop".

It took Lennon six months to persuade his fellow band members to agree to the release of the album, and despite not approving of the front cover, Paul McCartney was asked to provide a note for it which read: "When two great Saints meet, it is a humbling experience. The long battles to prove he was a Saint." In the UK, McCartney's quote and the album title were placed on its back cover. Unfinished Music No.1: Two Virgins failed to chart in the UK (and only 5,000 British copies were ever pressed), but managed to reach number 124 in the US, after 25,000 copies were sold. Several months after its release, Capitol gave away promotional blank picture disc copies of the album to its employees.

The cover art was changed for each of the album's three 8-track issues: Tetragrammaton/Ampex Tapes replaced the front cover with the back cover; North America Leisure Corp (NAL) reinstated the original front cover, and General Recorded Tape (GRT) released the 8-track with a paper sheet sleeve. The album was re-issued (albeit unlicensed and unauthorized) in the US during the 1970s and 1980s. One edition on the Rock Classics label, (Note: Rock Classics SSI 9999) which was released in January 1993, claimed to be distributed by Tetragrammaton (which was defunct by 1970) and not mastered from the original tape, but was merely transferred from a copy of the record with audible surface noise. The fake-stereo mix of the album was officially re-issued on Rykodisc on 3 June 1997, (Note: US Rykodisc RCD 10411) under the observation of Ono, with an additional bonus track—"Give Peace a Chance"'s B-side "Remember Love". This edition of the album is slightly edited; it is missing about 30 seconds of audio from the end of the second side, as well as a few seconds from the start of side two. Several unauthorized versions of the album, cassette tape and compact disc also exist.

Critics and the public abhorred the album. Actress Sissy Spacek, using the pseudonym Rainbo, recorded the song "John, You Went Too Far This Time" in response to the album's cover. (Note: US Roulette R-7030) In a retrospective assessment, William Ruhlmann of AllMusic remarked that it was "not unlike what you might get if you turned on a tape recorder for a random half-hour in your home", calling the music "naked". More favourable, Pitchfork reviewer Seth Colter Walls considered the album the "fascinating" product "of a first date", while noting "it has plenty of competition" with other Fluxus-inspired sound artefacts from the era. He also wrote that "Revolution 9", created by Lennon and Ono with George Harrison, is a "much tighter" sound collage than Two Virgins.

Lennon and Ono went on to release a further two related recordings: Unfinished Music No.2: Life with the Lions and the Wedding Album.

The album was reissued on LP, CD, and digitally by Secretly Canadian on 11 November 2016. The LP was a brand-new remaster of the unedited fake-stereo mix. The CD was identical to the Rykodisc CD edition.

== Track listing ==
All selections by John Lennon and Yoko Ono, except where noted.

Side one

1. "Two Virgins Side One" – 14:14
  - "Two Virgins No. 1"
  - "Together" performed by Nick Lucas (George "Buddy" DeSylva, Lew Brown, Ray Henderson)
  - "Two Virgins No. 2"
  - "Two Virgins No. 3"
  - "Two Virgins No. 4"
  - "Two Virgins No. 5"

Side two

1. "Two Virgins Side Two" – 14:45
  - "Two Virgins No. 6"
  - "Hushabye Hushabye" ("I'd Love to Fall Asleep and Wake Up in My Mammy's Arms" performed by Fred Douglas and his orchestra) (Sam M. Lewis, Joe Young, Fred E. Ahlert)
  - "Two Virgins No. 7"
  - "Two Virgins No. 8"
  - "Two Virgins No. 9"
  - "Two Virgins No. 10"

Bonus track

3. "Remember Love" (Ono) – 4:05

== Personnel ==
- John Lennon – vocals, spoken dialogue, screaming, piano, organ, mellotron, percussion, guitars, various instruments, tape loops, sound effects
- Yoko Ono – vocals, spoken dialogue, screaming, piano, percussion, various instruments, tape loops, sound effects
- Pete Shotton – tape loops

== Charts ==
Chart (1968)	Peak position	Total weeks
U.S. Billboard 200	124	8
