= 10 Admiral Grove =

Childhood home of Ringo Starr

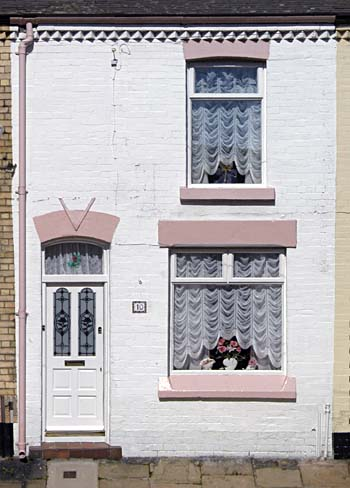
- Interactive map of the 10 Admiral Grove area

General information
- Type: Terraced house
- Architectural style: Victorian
- Location: 10 Admiral Grove, Liverpool, L8 8BH
- Coordinates: 53°23′21″N 2°57′41″W

10 Admiral Grove, a property in Toxteth, Liverpool, England, is the house in which Ringo Starr lived for twenty years before he rose to fame with the Beatles.

Starr's infant school, St. Silas Primary School, on Pengwern Street, was yards away from his front door. He was a sickly child and, due to his many absences from school, was taught to read and write at home. A severe bout of peritonitis resulted in him spending much of his seventh year at the Royal Children's Hospital. He subsequently recuperated at 10 Admiral Grove, causing him to miss a significant amount of schooling. During "Beatlemania", the documentary The Mersey Sound, filmed by BBC producer Don Haworth, showed Starr being mobbed by fans on Admiral Grove as he made his way to George Harrison's open-topped sports car.

== Birthplace in Madryn Street ==
On 7 July 1940, Richard Starkey was born at 9 Madryn Street in the Welsh Streets in the Liverpool district known as Toxteth. The neighbourhood was heavily damaged by aerial bombing during the Second World War. His parents, Richard and Elsie, rented a house at 9 Madryn Street for 10 shillings (£0.50) a week. His parents separated when Starr was three years old, and Elsie and her son moved to the smaller, less expensive two-up two-down house at 10 Admiral Grove. This remained Starr's home until 1963, when he became famous.

In 2010, it was announced that Starr's Madryn Street birthplace, as well as other houses in the Welsh Streets region, was to be demolished. Local groups called for its preservation, and the city had to board up the house due to relic hunters stealing bricks. An online petition demanding that the house be preserved by the National Trust collected nearly 4,000 signatures. In 2012, Housing Minister Grant Shapps confirmed that the house would be saved from demolition. In January 2013, it was announced that local residents had backed a development plan that would include the restoration of 9 Madryn Street. However, the Department for Communities and Local Government announced in September 2013 that it would hold a public inquiry into the plans.

In The Beatles Anthology, Starr is quoted as saying: "I don’t remember the inside of our house in Madryn Street, I was a baby". However, he does remember his grandparents' house, which was also on Madryn Street.

== Legacy ==
Elsie and Harry were persuaded to leave Admiral Grove for a house Starr had bought them in the Gateacre district of Liverpool. Starr would pay homage to both his Madryn Street and Admiral Grove addresses in his 2008 song "Liverpool 8".

In 2016, the house at 10 Admiral Grove was purchased by a Beatles fan who also owns houses owned previously by George Harrison and John Lennon's mother Julia.

== See also ==
- 12 Arnold Grove – birthplace of George Harrison
- 20 Forthlin Road – childhood home of Paul McCartney; a National Trust property
- 251 Menlove Avenue – childhood home of John Lennon; another National Trust property
