= Nuffield Health =

British healthcare charity

- Type: Not-for-profit, limited by guarantee
- Industry: Healthcare
- Founded: 1957
- Headquarters: Epsom, England
- Key people: Alex Perry, CEO (2024–present)
- Products: Hospitals, medical centres, health clinics, fitness and wellbeing gyms, physiotherapy, employee wellbeing and health assessments
- Revenue: £1.358 billion GBP (2023)
- Number of employees: 18,000
- Website: www.nuffieldhealth.com

Nuffield Health is the United Kingdom's largest healthcare charity. Established in 1957 the charity operates 37 Nuffield Health Hospitals and 110 Nuffield Health Fitness & Wellbeing Centres. It is independent of the National Health Service and is constituted as a registered charity. Its objectives are to 'advance, promote and maintain health and healthcare of all descriptions and to prevent, relieve and cure sickness and ill health of any kind, all for the public benefit'.

As a trading charity, it charges fees for access to its hospital and fitness services. In 2024, Nuffield Health had a group turnover of £1.453 billion, making it the largest charity operating in the UK.

Alongside its paid for services, Nuffield Health also runs free community programmes to address unmet health needs in underserved communities. In 2023 its community programmes delivered £100 million in Social Value.

== History ==
On 14 January 1957, the British United Provident Association (BUPA) established the Nursing Homes Charitable Trust to acquire and build community facilities equipped for the demands of modern medicine. In 1957 the President of BUPA, William Morris, 1st Viscount Nuffield, suggested the charity might benefit from incorporating his name so was re-registered as the Nuffield Nursing Homes Trust (NNHT).

At this time the Trust purchased the Strathallan nursing home in Bournemouth for £23,150. It was closed for ten months to be refurbished and reopened as the first Nuffield Hospital. In its first ten years, the Trust acquired and modernised a total of six dilapidated nursing homes and built seven new ones, together providing more than 400 beds.

The earliest purpose-built hospital opened at Woking in 1962; others followed at Exeter, Shrewsbury, Hull, Birmingham and Slough. In 1966, NNHT opened a new flagship hospital, the Fitzroy Nuffield Nursing Home, in London's Bryanston Square, at a cost of over half a million pounds. It had 46 beds, two operating theatres, consulting rooms, and X-ray and pathology departments. This was renamed in 1983 as the Fitzroy Nuffield Hospital.

By 1982, NHHT had grown to 31 hospitals and 1,076 beds. In 1983, the trading name was changed to Nuffield Hospitals, the 'nursing homes' element no longer conveyed the focus on modern hospitals rather than nursing homes. Fitzroy Nuffield Hospital closed in October 1996. In 1997, it was demolished, apart from the facade, and rebuilt as Ellerton House, an apartment block. The trust ran all sites on a strictly self-supporting, though non-profit-making, basis. Charges from patients were expected to cover not only operating costs but repairs and depreciation.

A new direction was taken in 2005, when Tweed Park and Sona Fitness were acquired and merged to become Proactive Health, a new business arm providing clinical health services to public and corporate members. In 2007, Cannons Health & Fitness was acquired, increasing services to include physiotherapy, weight management and health assessments.

In July 2008, Nuffield Hospitals, Proactive Health and Cannons merged to become Nuffield Health, connecting fitness, prevention and treatment under a single brand, governance and management structure. The acquisition in 2014 of a further nine health clubs from Virgin Active, LA Fitness in Chester and in 2015, a further two sites in London (CityPoint, Moorgate and Market Sports, Shoreditch) broadened the Nuffield Health national network of Fitness & Wellbeing Gyms to 77 branches.

In November 2025, Nuffield Health permanently closed its Nuffield Health at St Bartholomew's Hospital and handed back the lease of the £70 million facility. The NHS subsequently announced plans to take over the site.

== Development ==
In 2016, Nuffield Health acquired 35 Virgin Active clubs. Unconfirmed rumours put the value of the acquisition at £80 million.

In 2021 Nuffield Health completed the acquisition of five hospitals from Aspen Healthcare, and in May 2022 Nuffield Health at St Bartholomew's Hospital opened, becoming the first independent hospital in the City of London.

=== Permanently closed ===
The Nuffield Health gym at Merton Abbey was closed on 17 November 2024, reducing the total number of gyms in the chain to 110.

Nuffield Health at St Bartholomew's Hospital's elective operations formally ceased on 12 November 2025, and the facility was officially archived from active operations on 16 December 2025.

== Awards ==
Nuffield Health has won multiple awards, including:

- Silver Award 2025 - Defence Employer Recognition Scheme
- Most Effective Contribution to Integrated Health and Care 2025 – HSJ Partnership Awards
- Healthy Community Award 2022 – ukactive Awards
- Infection Prevention Society Practitioner of the Year 2016, Sue Millward – IPS Awards
- Best Healthcare & Social Employer runner up 2016 – Bloomberg Best Employers
- Bronze Award 2016 from the Defence Employer Recognition Scheme
- Best brand architecture solution bronze, Best use of typography bronze and Best visual identity from the healthcare and pharmaceuticals sector bronze 2016 – Transform Awards
- Best workplace wellbeing provider 2012, 2013, and 2014 – Health Insurance Awards
- Integrated Corporate Wellbeing 2008, 2009, 2010 and 2011 – Flame
- Management Excellence 2010 – Laing and Buisson
- Risk Management 2009 – Laing and Buisson

== See also ==
- Private healthcare in the United Kingdom
- List of hospitals in England
- List of hospitals in Scotland
