= Isaac Tigrett =

American businessman (born 1948)

- Born: Isaac Burton Tigrett; November 28, 1948 (age 77); Jackson, Tennessee, U.S.
- Education: Centre College
- Occupations: Founder of Hard Rock Café and House of Blues
- Spouse: Maureen Cox (m. 1989; died 1994)
- Children: 1

Isaac Burton Tigrett (born November 28, 1948) is an American businessman, best known as the co-founder of Hard Rock Café and House of Blues.

He is the widower of the late Maureen Cox Tigrett (formerly Starkey), the ex-wife of Beatle drummer Ringo Starr. His wife died of leukemia in 1994.

== Early life ==
Isaac Tigrett belonged to a well-to-do business family and was raised in Jackson, Tennessee, until the age of 15. His grandfather, also Isaac Burton Tigrett, was a banker who acquired, developed and merged railroads in the Deep South. The younger Tigrett was a boarding student at McCallie School in Chattanooga, Tennessee, but was expelled. He then enrolled at Baylor School in Chattanooga, from where he graduated. He is an alumnus of Centre College, which later gave him an honorary degree (in 1997) for promoting African American culture and racial harmony.

== Career ==
On June 14, 1971, he and Peter Morton started the first Hard Rock Café (HRC) restaurant in London's fashionable Mayfair district. The restaurant combined rock music, memorabilia related to rock 'n' roll and American cuisine.

The cafe-music-museum concept became very popular and soon the restaurant opened units in different parts of the globe. HRC was the first theme restaurant chain in the world. Tigrett bought Morton out, and took on the original Cafe in London along with rights to the name in most of the world including the U.S. states East of the Mississippi; Morton had rights to the name in states West of the Mississippi and in Israel, Colombia and Australia. Eventually both sold their interests in HRC to the Rank Organisation.

In 1992, Tigrett started the House of Blues (HOB) with partner Dan Aykroyd. Harvard University was an initial investor in the business and a prototype was opened in Cambridge, Massachusetts. Soon after Disney and Andrew Filipowski invested in the venture. Differences of opinion between Tigrett and the other HOB board members over operations resulted in Tigrett leaving the venture in 1998.

In the late 1990s, Tigrett launched The Spirit Channel, an enterprise offering services related to spirituality and health through the Internet, traditional media and physical locations. The venture failed to take off. In 2004, Tigrett launched yet another new venture, the Bozo Project, focusing on the restaurant business.

Tigrett was influenced by his guru, Sathya Sai Baba. In the BBC documentary The Secret Swami, Tigrett stated that he believed that there was truth to the rumors of Sai Baba's actions of pedophilia and sexual abuse towards some of his young male followers. He also stated that such behavior would not change his belief in Sai Baba.

== Personal life ==
In 1989, Tigrett married Maureen Cox Starkey, the ex-wife of Beatle drummer Ringo Starr. She died of leukemia in 1994.
