= 20 Forthlin Road =

Childhood home of Paul McCartney in Liverpool

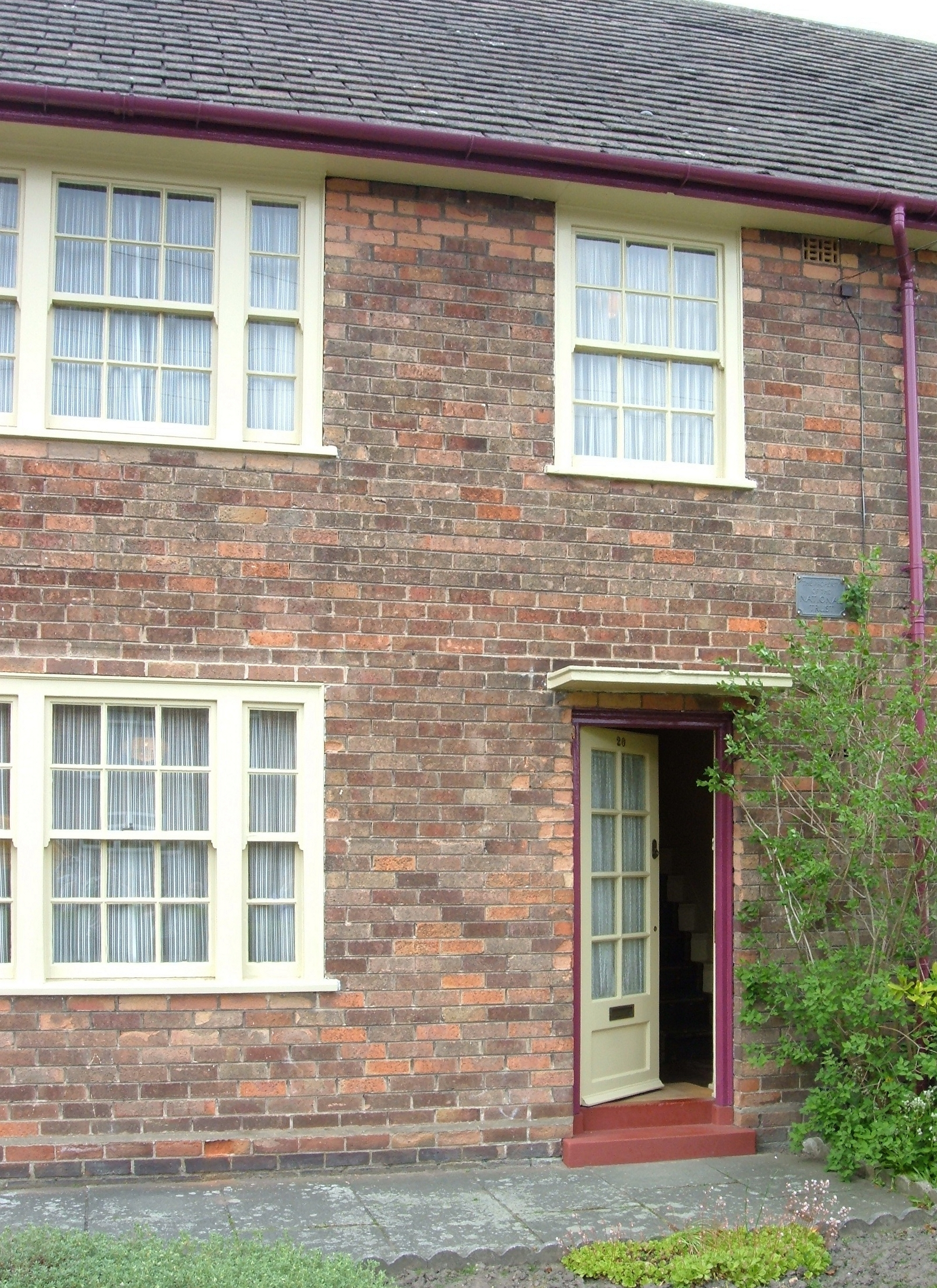

General information
- Type: Terraced house
- Location: 20 Forthlin Road, Liverpool, L18 9TN
- Coordinates: 53°22′11″N 2°53′52″W
- Owner: National Trust

Website
- www.nationaltrust.org.uk/beatles-childhood-homes/

20 Forthlin Road is a National Trust property in Allerton in Liverpool, Merseyside, England. It is the house in which Paul McCartney lived for several years before he rose to fame with the Beatles, and it is labelled by the National Trust as "the birthplace of the Beatles". It was also the home of his brother Mike and the birthplace of the comedy, poetry and music trio the Scaffold, of which Mike was a member.

== History ==
The house was built in 1949 and owned by the local authority, and the McCartney family moved into it in 1955, when Paul was at secondary school.

In 1965, Paul bought his father Jim a house in Heswall, a wealthy part of the Wirral.

The house has been owned by the National Trust since 1995. The Trust markets the house as "the birthplace of the Beatles", since this is the place where the Beatles composed and rehearsed their earliest songs.

Unlike Mendips, the childhood home of John Lennon, which was commemorated with an English Heritage blue plaque on 7 December 2000, the day before the 20th anniversary of his death, 20 Forthlin Road has not received a blue plaque. Under English Heritage criteria, individuals must have been deceased for at least 20 years or have reached the centenary of their birth before a plaque is awarded.

In February 2012, both this house and Lennon's childhood home at 251 Menlove Avenue were Grade II listed by Historic England.

The home was featured in an edition of Carpool Karaoke, which aired on 22 June 2018, episode of The Late Late Show with James Corden. Corden visited there with Paul McCartney, who said it was his first visit to the home since he moved away in his late teens.

== See also ==
- 251 Menlove Avenue – childhood home of John Lennon; another National Trust property
- 12 Arnold Grove – birthplace of George Harrison
- 10 Admiral Grove – Ringo Starr's childhood home
