= Ian Sommerville (technician) =

British electronics technician and computer programmer

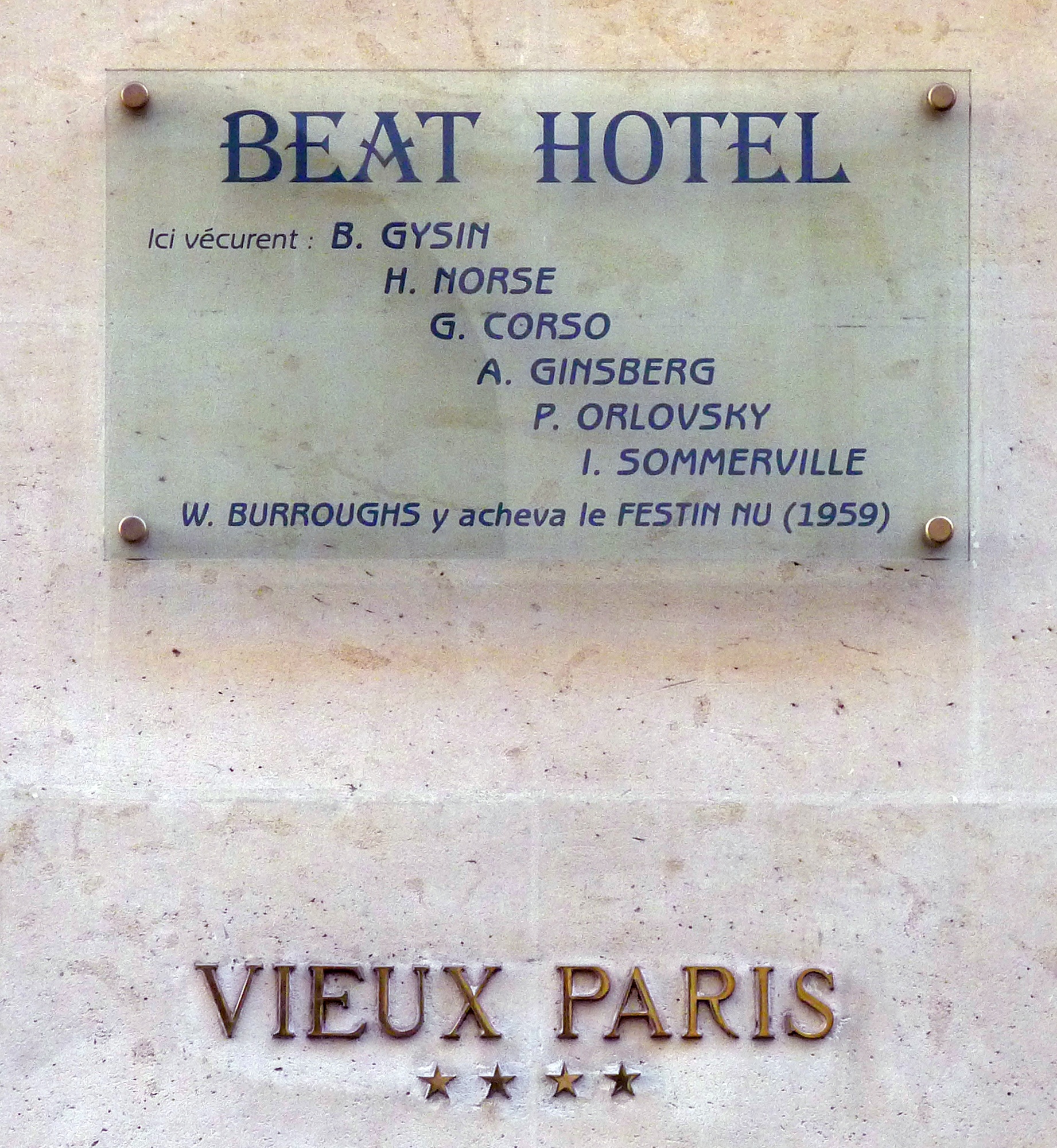
Plaque at the Beat Hotel

Ian Sommerville (3 June 1940 – 5 February 1976) was an electronics technician and computer programmer. He is primarily known through his association with William S. Burroughs's circle of Beat Generation figures, and lived at Paris's so-called "Beat Hotel" by 1960, when they were regulars there, becoming Burroughs's lover and "systems adviser".

Sommerville was educated at the King's School, Canterbury, and at Corpus Christi College, Cambridge. Around 1960, he programmed a random-sequence generator that Brion Gysin used in his cut-up technique. He and Gysin also collaborated in 1961 in developing the Dreamachine, a phonograph-driven stroboscope described as "the first art object to be seen with the eyes closed", and intended to affect the viewer's brain alpha wave activity.

Sommerville and Burroughs made the 5-minute tape "Silver Smoke of Dreams" in the early 1960s, and later provided the basis for the quarter-hour audio "cut-up" and "K-9 Was in Combat with the Alien Mind-Screens" around 1965. The following year Sommerville also installed two Revox reel-to-reel machines for Paul McCartney in Ringo Starr's apartment at 34 Montagu Square, Marylebone, London, and recorded Burroughs on the machine.

Sommerville along with Gysin and Burroughs collaborated on Let The Mice In, published in 1973. Burroughs' book My Education: A Book of Dreams, indeed largely composed of accounts of his dreams, includes dreams of talking with Sommerville.

He died in a car accident on William Burroughs's birthday, 5 February 1976. Burroughs's biographer Barry Miles reports that Ian had sent Burroughs a telegram that day saying, "Happy birthday. Lots of love. No realisation. Ian". "No realisation" referred to Ian's unsuccessful search for a job as a computer programmer in America.
