= 34 Montagu Square, Marylebone =

Address of a London flat once leased by Ringo Starr

Coordinates: 51.51864°N 0.16004°W

34 Montagu Square
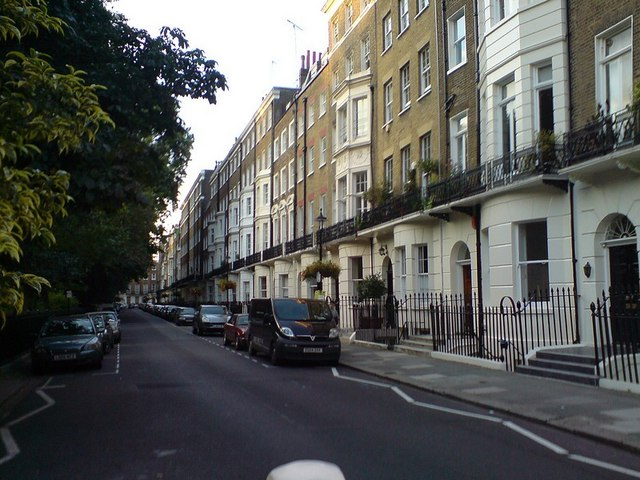
- Regency Houses in Montagu Square

General information
- Type: Residential
- Architectural style: Regency
- Location: 34 Montagu Square, Marylebone, London, London, England
- Construction started: 1810
- Owner: Reynold D' Silva (since 2002)

Technical details
- Floor count: Six (including basement)

Design and construction
- Architect: Joseph T. Parkinson

34 Montagu Square is the address of a London ground floor and basement flat once leased by Beatles member Ringo Starr during the mid-1960s. Its location is 1.3 miles (2.09 km) from the Abbey Road Studios, where The Beatles recorded. Many well-known people have lived at the address, including a British Member of Parliament, Richard Hanbury Gurney, and the daughter of the Marquess of Sligo, Lady Emily Charlotte Browne. The square was named after Elizabeth Montagu, who was highly regarded by London society in the late 18th century.

Paul McCartney recorded demo songs there, such as "I'm Looking Through You", and worked on various compositions, including "Eleanor Rigby". With the help of Ian Sommerville he converted the flat to a studio for Apple Corps' avant-garde Zapple label, recording William S. Burroughs for spoken-word Zapple albums. Jimi Hendrix and his manager, Chas Chandler, later lived there with their girlfriends. While living there, Hendrix composed "The Wind Cries Mary".

For three months, John Lennon and Yoko Ono rented the flat, taking a photograph that would become the cover of their Two Virgins album. After the police raided the flat looking for drugs, the landlord of the property sought an injunction against Starr to prevent it from being used for anything untoward or illegal. Starr sold the lease in February 1969.

In 2010, after a 10-year campaign by proposer, Peter Davies, English Heritage agreed to commemorate John Lennon's London address with a blue marker plaque at the site, making it an English Heritage "building of historical interest". On 23 October 2010, Yoko Ono unveiled the plaque with the inscription 'JOHN LENNON Musician and Songwriter 1940–1980 lived here in 1968'.

34 and the adjoining 33 Montagu Square have been listed Grade II on the National Heritage List for England since December 1987.

== History and occupants ==
Joseph T. Parkinson designed and built the houses in Montagu Square as part of the Portman Estate, between 1810 and 1815. It was named after the Yorkshire-born Elizabeth Montagu: a social reformer, patron of the arts, salonist, literary critic, and writer. She had lived nearby, in Montagu House, Portman Square, until her death on 25 August 1800. The square is an example of Regency terrace residential architecture that was popular in the 19th century, with a communal garden located in the centre; surrounded by iron railings and padlocked so its use would be limited to residents. No. 34 was built as one of the square's many tall buildings which were originally intended for use as whole family homes instead of apartments. A Victorian writer was especially caustic when talking about the architecture: "Montagu Square and Bryanston Square are twin deformities, [which were built by] economical modern builders ... [to] dispose of with profit to those who wish to live near the great".

Richard Hanbury Gurney, a banker and M.P. for Norwich, lived at No. 34 in 1830. He was the half-brother of Hudson Gurney, who became an M.P. for Newtown, Isle of Wight in 1816. In the book, A local index to the list of proprietors of East India stock, John White was cited as living there in 1848, and according to the Royal Pharmaceutical Society's journals, one Thomas Hopkins, a pharmacist, was living in the house in 1849. Aged 86, Lady Emily Charlotte Browne died at the address on 14 March 1916. She was the 5th daughter of Peter Howe, the Marquess of Sligo, and of royal blood. The English model and actress, Chrissie Shrimpton (Mick Jagger's girlfriend from 1963 to 1966), lived close to No. 34 in the 1960s.

=== Starr's lease ===
Starr leased Flat 1 in 1965, shortly before his marriage to Maureen Cox. It consisted of the ground floor and lower-ground floor (the cellar/basement in the original house), and entrance was gained by walking down the steps leading to the lower-ground floor door, or the front door at ground level. The ground floor had an en-suite bathroom (with a pink bath sunk into the floor) a bedroom and a sitting room. Downstairs was a kitchen, a bathroom and a bedroom/sitting room, which had its original fireplace. A resident of the square, Lord Mancroft, welcomed Starr, saying to a journalist, "We're a very distinguished square, and I'm sure we'll welcome such a distinguished gentleman and his lady."

The Swiss Embassy was, and is, located at the back of the house at 16–18 Montagu Place, but in August 1965, an embassy spokesperson complained that Beatles' fans were defacing their back wall (in Bryanston Mews), with messages meant for Starr: "Our back wall is now very unsightly and we shall have to redecorate. Our chauffeur, who is French and took part in the first World War, says the language some of these young people use is worse than anything he ever heard in the trenches".

The Starrs lived there until Brian Epstein's accountant suggested that the group members should move to houses near his, in Esher. On 24 July 1965, Starr bought Sunny Heights for £30,000 ($72,000), on South Road, St George's Hill, but retained the lease on the flat. He rented the flat to The Fool, who were employed by Apple for various endeavours, such as painting the Apple Boutique in Baker Street, London, and designing psychedelic clothes for all four Beatles, as well as The Hollies, Marianne Faithfull, Procol Harum, Donovan, and Cream.

== McCartney and Hendrix ==
Paul McCartney rented the flat from Starr in 1965, and asked Ian Sommerville to install recording equipment (including two Revox reel-to-reel tape machines); planning to use it as a demo studio, and for recordings of spoken-word albums. The house was not far from the Abbey Road studio where The Beatles recorded, and Jane Asher's parents' house at 57 Wimpole Street, London, where McCartney was living at the time. He recorded a demo version of "I'm Looking Through You" at Montagu Square in late March 1965, and worked on the composition of "Eleanor Rigby". Sommerville moved into the flat, even though it was supposed to only be used as a studio, but defended the move by stating that he had to be "on call at all times". Sommerville recorded Burroughs there, for Apple's Zapple label offshoot, but discouraged other people who were interested, believing he was working for McCartney exclusively. During the time Sommerville was recording Burroughs, a friend of McCartney, Barry Miles, visited the apartment:

Ian [Sommerville] was in the strange position of playing host in Ringo's expensive apartment, fixing everyone drinks, fussing about, cautioning everyone not to lean against the green watermarked silk wallpaper in the sitting room.

McCartney later gave up the flat, and it remained empty until Starr sub-let it to Jimi Hendrix with Kathy Etchingham, and Chas Chandler with Lotta Null, in December 1966, for £30 ($63) a month (£265.12—$625.15 today). Hendrix and Echingham lived on the lower-ground floor, and Hendrix composed "The Wind Cries Mary" there, after an argument with Echingham about her cooking skills. For three months, between 1966 and 1967, Hendrix shared the apartment with Gordon Haskell, a bassist who played with the psychedelic band Les Fleur de Lys. When Hendrix was under the effects of LSD, he threw whitewash over the walls, forcing Starr to evict him. Starr also lent the flat to other pop stars and friends over the next few years, when they needed a place to stay in London. John Lennon's mother-in-law, Lillian Powell, stayed at Montagu Square rather than at the Lennons' home, Kenwood, in Weybridge, when she visited her daughter, Cynthia Lennon.

=== Lennon and Ono ===
When Lennon started a relationship with Yoko Ono in 1968, his wife and son moved into the flat on 21 June 1968, living there for three months, before returning to Kenwood, as Lennon and Ono preferred to live at Montagu Square, rather than in isolated Weybridge. The two lived in the Montagu Square flat for several months, as the White Album was being recorded. Visitors remembered that the flat was in a state of squalor, with dirty plates, cups, clothes, newspapers and magazines littering the floor, with the couple living on "a diet of champagne, caviar, and heroin". Lennon and Ono's experimental Two Virgins album had been recorded at Kenwood, but its notorious nude cover photos were taken at 34 Montagu Square. An Apple employee, Tony Bramwell, set up the camera so Lennon could take the photograph after Bramwell had left. Ono was pregnant during their stay, and they were also in the throes of heroin addiction.

At 11:30 am on 18 October 1968, the flat was raided by Sgt. Norman Pilcher, of Scotland Yard's Drugs Squad. In 1974, Lennon remembered that Ono answered the front door as a female voice had said (over the intercom), that there was a message from the Apple office. Ono opened the door and saw the female with five men, who were all dressed in plain-clothes. She panicked and closed the door, thinking they were Beatles' fans. Meanwhile, at the back window, another person was banging on the window and holding up a search warrant for Lennon to read. As Lennon was also panicking—not knowing at that point that they were all police officers—the raid consisted of seven police officers and two police dogs—he played for time and refused to open the window. Because of this, Pilcher later accused Lennon of obstruction of justice, which was a crime. Inside the flat, the police searched every room thoroughly, even though Lennon was supposed to accompany them whilst they did so, according to the law. Pilcher then summoned Lennon and pointed to a binocular case on a mantelpiece, asking him, "Is this yours?" Lennon replied in the affirmative, and was then shown 219 grams of hashish, which was in the case.

Lennon:

Don Shorter [a Daily Express reporter] had told us, 'They're coming to get you', three weeks before. So, believe me, I'd cleaned the house out, because Jimi Hendrix had lived there in the apartment, and I'm not stupid. I went through the whole damn house.

Both were arrested, with Lennon pleading guilty to hashish possession, absolving Ono, who miscarried not long after. Lennon was fined £150 ($360). Note: in November 1973, Pilcher was arrested for conspiracy to pervert the course of justice after it was alleged he had committed perjury. He was convicted and sentenced to four years imprisonment. After the raid, the landlord sought an injunction against Starr on 19 February 1969, forbidding anyone but Starr or his family to live there, and allowing no music or instruments to be played. Starr appealed, and a compromise was offered; only Starr or a family member would live in the flat. To finally settle the case, Starr sold the lease on 28 February 1969.

== Legacy ==
A music label owner, Reynold D’Silva, bought the flat for £550,000 in 2002, beating a rival bid from Noel Gallagher. D’Silva considered opening it as a music museum, but decided to rent it instead, for £795 per week. Author Barry Miles contended that 34 Montagu Square "clearly qualifies as a candidate for one of the blue marker plaques that the City of Westminster fixes to buildings of historical interest". On Saturday 23 October 2010, following a 10-year campaign by proposer, Peter Davies, and in front of 100 people, Yoko Ono unveiled a Blue Plaque at 34 Montagu Square: "John Lennon, 1940–1980, Musician and songwriter, lived here in 1968". Beatles' biographer, Hunter Davies, started the unveiling ceremony, with Rod Davis, from Lennon's first group, The Quarrymen, in the gathering. Ono said:

I am very honoured to unveil this blue plaque and thank English Heritage for honouring John in this way. This particular flat has many memories for me and is a very interesting part of our history. In what would have been John's 70th year, I am grateful to you all for commemorating John and this particular part of his London life, one which spawned so much of his great music and great art.

Davis also commented:

He [Lennon] would think it highly amusing that they've put up a plaque here, considering what happened here. If only they'd mentioned the drugs bust on the bottom of the plaque. Wherever he is, he would have a great chuckle about this one.
