= Joseph Lockwood =

British businessman (1904–1991)

Sir Joseph Lockwood
- Born: Joseph Flawith Lockwood; 14 November 1904; Southwell, Nottinghamshire, England
- Died: 6 March 1991 (aged 86); Buckinghamshire, England
- Occupations: Businessman, record and entertainment company executive

Sir Joseph Flawith Lockwood (14 November 1904 – 6 March 1991), was a British industrialist and businessman, whose initial reputation was as an executive of a flour milling company. Later, as chairman of EMI between 1954 and 1974, he oversaw the company's expansion in the music business, and the signing and marketing of acts including The Beatles. He was knighted in 1960.

== Early life ==
He was born in Southwell, Nottinghamshire, the second son of flour mill owner Joseph Agnew Lockwood and his wife, Mabel (née Caudwell). Through his father he was a distant cousin to the actress Margaret Lockwood and to Solicitor General Sir Frank Lockwood, their common ancestor being Joseph Lockwood (c. 1758 – 1837), a former Mayor of Doncaster, Yorkshire. Lockwood attended schools in Southwell, Lincoln and Newark, but left at the age of 16 without qualifications and described his education as "little more than rudimentary".

== Flour milling and related activities ==
He worked at the family mill before travelling to Chile at the age of 19, and becoming manager of a flour mill in Santiago, later moving to Concepción. He returned to England in about 1928, and began working for Ernest Simon in his family firm of mill builders, Henry Simon (later known as Simon Carves). Despite his lack of engineering qualifications he successfully supervised the rebuilding of a mill in Belgium, and moved up through the company's management until he was appointed to the board around 1934. With his enthusiasm for research and development, the company expanded under his direction, becoming the world's largest manufacturer of flour mills. He wrote the standard book on the subject of mill technology, Flour Milling, in 1945, and also researched and wrote on the subject of pelletised animal feed and its manufacture.

At the start of the Second World War, he took charge of measures to protect from firebombs in north west England, and became a member of a working party on wartime food supplies in Europe. Towards the end of the war, working with SHAEF, he followed the advancing troops in order to supervise the storage and production of grain, flour and foodstuffs in areas of Europe that were becoming liberated; he was in Lüneburg when Himmler committed suicide and in Berlin soon after the death of Hitler.

He became chairman of Henry Simon Ltd. in 1950, and in 1951 became a director of the National Research Development Corporation.

== Management of EMI ==
In early 1954, he was approached by Sir Edward de Stein to join the board of EMI, and he became its chairman on his fiftieth birthday later in the year. At the time, EMI was losing some £0.5 million per year and was on the verge of bankruptcy. He instigated a run-down of the gramophone and radio manufacturing side of the company, giving it a greater focus on industrial electronic equipment through a partnership with Thorn Electrical Industries. He also started to oversee substantial growth in EMI's involvement in the record industry, buying and developing the American Capitol company in the late 1950s, and appointing George Martin to take charge of the Parlophone label. By 1960, EMI's annual profits were some £5 million. Joseph Lockwood was appointed Knight Bachelor in the 1960 New Year Honours list.

He prioritised the production and sale of popular records, rather than classical records aimed at a prestige market. He also changed marketing and distribution arrangements; previously, only a small handful of record shops in Britain had been permitted to sell EMI records, and Lockwood pioneered new ways of ensuring the rapid distribution of hit records to shops. By 1973, EMI was reported to be the largest record company in the world. Lockwood also led the involvement of EMI in the British film industry.

Lockwood was regarded as close to the Beatles, who generated a large share of EMI's profits during the 1960s. It has been suggested that his relationship with the group was eased because both he and the Beatles' manager Brian Epstein were both Jewish and gay. Lockwood occasionally intervened personally in areas of dispute, for example to insist on the release of the "Penny Lane" / "Strawberry Fields Forever" single, and in ensuring that the Beatles rather than EMI would be held legally responsible if there were objections from celebrities pictured on the cover of the Sgt. Pepper's Lonely Hearts Club Band album. He was seen as willing to overlook "eccentricities" such as their drug use, saying "I never pursued it... largely because they were so successful". However, he refused to allow EMI to distribute the Two Virgins album because of its controversial sleeve design.

== Later years and death ==
Lockwood retired as chairman of EMI in 1974. He died at his home in Buckinghamshire in 1991 at the age of 86.
