= Wedding Album =

Studio album by John Lennon and Yoko Ono
- Released: 20 October 1969
- Recorded: 25–31 March 1969; 22 and 27 April 1969
- Studios: Room 902, Hilton Hotel, Amsterdam; EMI, London
- Genres: Avant-garde; spoken word
- Length: 47:38
- Label: Apple
- Producers: John Lennon, Yoko Ono

John Lennon and Yoko Ono chronology
| Unfinished Music No. 2: Life with the Lions (1969) | Wedding Album (1969) | Live Peace in Toronto 1969 (with The Plastic Ono Band) (1969) |

Wedding Album is the third and final in a succession of three collaborative experimental albums by John Lennon and Yoko Ono. It followed Unfinished Music No. 1: Two Virgins and Unfinished Music No. 2: Life with the Lions. In Britain, the album was released credited by "John and Yoko", without last names mentioned. In the United States, it was released credited by "John Ono Lennon & Yoko Ono Lennon."

== Recording ==
"John & Yoko", the first side, a recording made on 22 and 27 April 1969, is of Lennon and Ono calling out each other's names, through a range of volume, tempos, and emotions, over the sound of their heartbeats. The two recorded on individual microphones. Lennon described the heartbeats as being "like African drums", and the piece being "like an extended, very extreme "John and Marsha" that was out years ago by Stan Freberg. It really makes your hair stand on end." Lennon edited the two together on 1 May 1969.

"Amsterdam", the second side, had been recorded first, in a hotel room at the Hilton Hotel in Amsterdam, the Netherlands during 25–31 March 1969. The piece consists of interviews explaining their campaign for peace, conversations and captured sounds during the couple's "Bed-In" honeymoon. An early form of what would become "John John Let's Hope for Peace" forms the beginning of "Amsterdam". There were also four other musical interludes including Lennon performing a blues-style composition on acoustic guitar, featuring the words "Goodbye Amsterdam Goodbye". Ono sings "Grow Your Hair", a song regarding peace. Lennon sings a brief excerpt in a cappella of the Beatles song "Good Night". The last interlude is a short recitation of the words "Bed peace" and "Hair peace".

Outtakes and interviews from Lennon and Ono's Bed-In were released as promo 7" vinyl acetates by Bell.

== Release and reception ==
Professional ratings
Review scores
| Source | Rating |
|---|---|
| AllMusic | 1.5/5 stars |
| MusicHound | woof! |
| The Rolling Stone Album Guide | 1.5/5 stars |

Wedding Album was initially released on Apple on 20 October 1969 in the US, (Note: US Apple SMAX 3361) and 7 November 1969 in the UK. (Note: UK Apple SAPCOR 11) The record came as an elaborate box set designed by John Kosh, including sets of photos, comic strip drawings by Lennon, a reproduction of the marriage certificate, (Note: Lennon and Ono's marriage was held in Gibraltar on 20 March 1969.) a picture of a slice of wedding cake (inside a white sleeve), and a booklet of press clippings about the couple. It also included a Mylar bag that had the word "Bagism" printed on it. The album did not chart in the UK, but managed to peak at number 178 in the US, staying on the charts for three weeks. Regarding the limited success, Lennon later addressed it saying, "It was like our sharing our wedding with whoever wanted to share it with us. We didn't expect a hit record out of it. It was more of a... that's why we called it Wedding Album. You know, people make a wedding album, show it to the relatives when they come round. Well, our relatives are the... what you call fans, or people that follow us outside. So that was our way of letting them join in on the wedding". The album was available on vinyl, cassette tape and 8-track tape, each with the same deluxe packaging. The album was also advertised through magazine print advertisements, which Lennon and Ono's previous two albums had not been. The album was reissued in 1997 through Rykodisc with three bonus cuts – two of them B-sides by The Plastic Ono Band composed by Ono. The album was reissued again in March 2019 on Sean Lennon's Chimera label in collaboration with Secretly Canadian. This edition was released with the two original tracks. The release commemorated the 50th anniversary of the famous Bed-In in the Amsterdam Hilton Hotel in March 1969.

Melody Maker critic Richard Williams was given two single-sided test pressings for his review (which appeared on the front page of the November 15th issue). Each had a blank side featuring only an engineer's test signal, but Williams mistook it for a double album. In his review, he noted that sides two and four consisted entirely "of single tones maintained throughout, presumably produced electronically", and that the pitch of the notes appeared to change slightly. Lennon and Ono sent a telegram to Williams thanking him for his review and writing: "We both feel that this is the first time a critic topped the artist. We are not joking."

== Track listing ==
All pieces by John Lennon and Yoko Ono, except where noted.

Side one
| No. | Title | Length |
|---|---|---|
| 1. | "John & Yoko" | 22:44 |

Side two
| No. | Title | Length |
|---|---|---|
| 1. | "Amsterdam" | 25:00 |

CD bonus tracks
| No. | Title | Writer(s) | Length |
|---|---|---|---|
| 3. | "Who Has Seen the Wind?" | Ono | 2:05 |
| 4. | "Listen, the Snow Is Falling" | Ono | 3:25 |
| 5. | "Don't Worry Kyoko (Mummy's Only Looking for Her Hand in the Snow)" (demo) | Ono | 2:15 |

- The bonus tracks are not present on the 2019 reissue.

== Personnel ==
- John Lennon – guitars, keyboards, heartbeat sounds, vocals
- Yoko Ono – vocals, rare sounds, heartbeat sounds
- Klaus Voormann – electric guitar, bass guitar (track 4)
- Nicky Hopkins – piano, chimes (track 4)
- Hugh McCracken – piano, chimes (track 4)

== Charts ==
| Chart (1969) | Peak position | Total weeks |
|---|---|---|
| U.S. Billboard 200 | 178 | 3 |
