= Susan Wood (photographer) =

American photographer (born 1932)

- Born: March 25, 1932
- Occupation: Photographer
- Website: www.susanwood.com

Susan Wood (born March 25, 1932) is a photographer who worked for Life, People, and New York magazines from the 1960s to the 1980s.

Her first employment was with Life magazine cutting up negatives for documentary photographer Margaret Bourke-White. Wood worked with 20th Century Fox, Paramount Pictures and United Artists and documented the movie sets of Easy Rider and Modesty Blaise. She also took photos of John Lennon and Yoko Ono for Look magazine and took the cover photograph for their album Unfinished Music No. 2: Life with the Lions.

In 2023 a retrospective exhibition of her work called Wind Up! Susan Wood Photographs: 1960s and beyond was held by the Irish Georgian Society in the City Assembly House, Dublin. Also in 2023 an exhibition featuring her film-related work called Susan Wood: On Location was held in Sag Harbor Cinema, featuring her work on the films Easy Rider, Hatari!, and Mirage.

== Bibliography ==
- Women: Portraits 1960–2000. Pointed Leaf Press, 2018. ISBN 978-1938461453
- Ireland. The Lilliput Press, 2018. ISBN 978-1843517450
