= Embassy of Switzerland, London =

Embassy of Switzerland in London
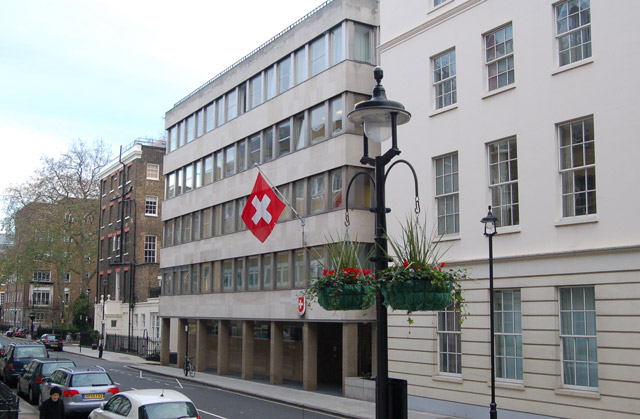
- Location: Marylebone, London
- Address: 16/18 Montagu Place, London, W1H 2BQ
- Coordinates: 51.5185°N 0.1608°W
- Ambassador: Markus Leitner (since 2021)

The Embassy of Switzerland (German: Schweizerische Botschaft im Vereinigten Königreich, French: Ambassade de Suisse au Royaume-Uni, Italian: Ambasciata di Svizzera nel Regno Unito) in London is the diplomatic mission of Switzerland in the United Kingdom. It consists of a large nineteenth-century building with a modern addition and is located halfway between Montagu Square and Bryanston Square. There is a commemorative stone at the entrance to the embassy marking its rebuilding in 1970.

== Gallery ==
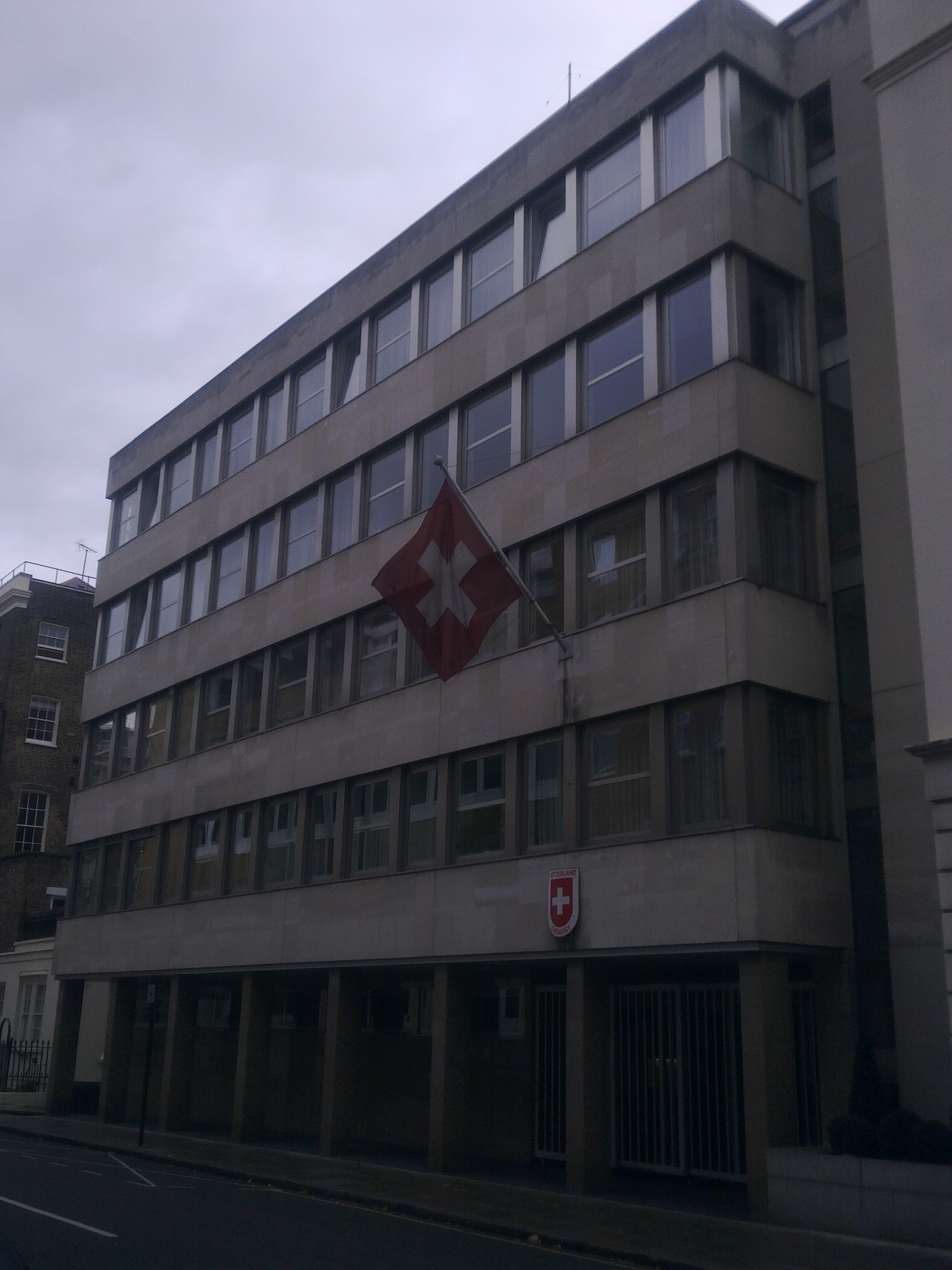
The embassy with the Flag of Switzerland

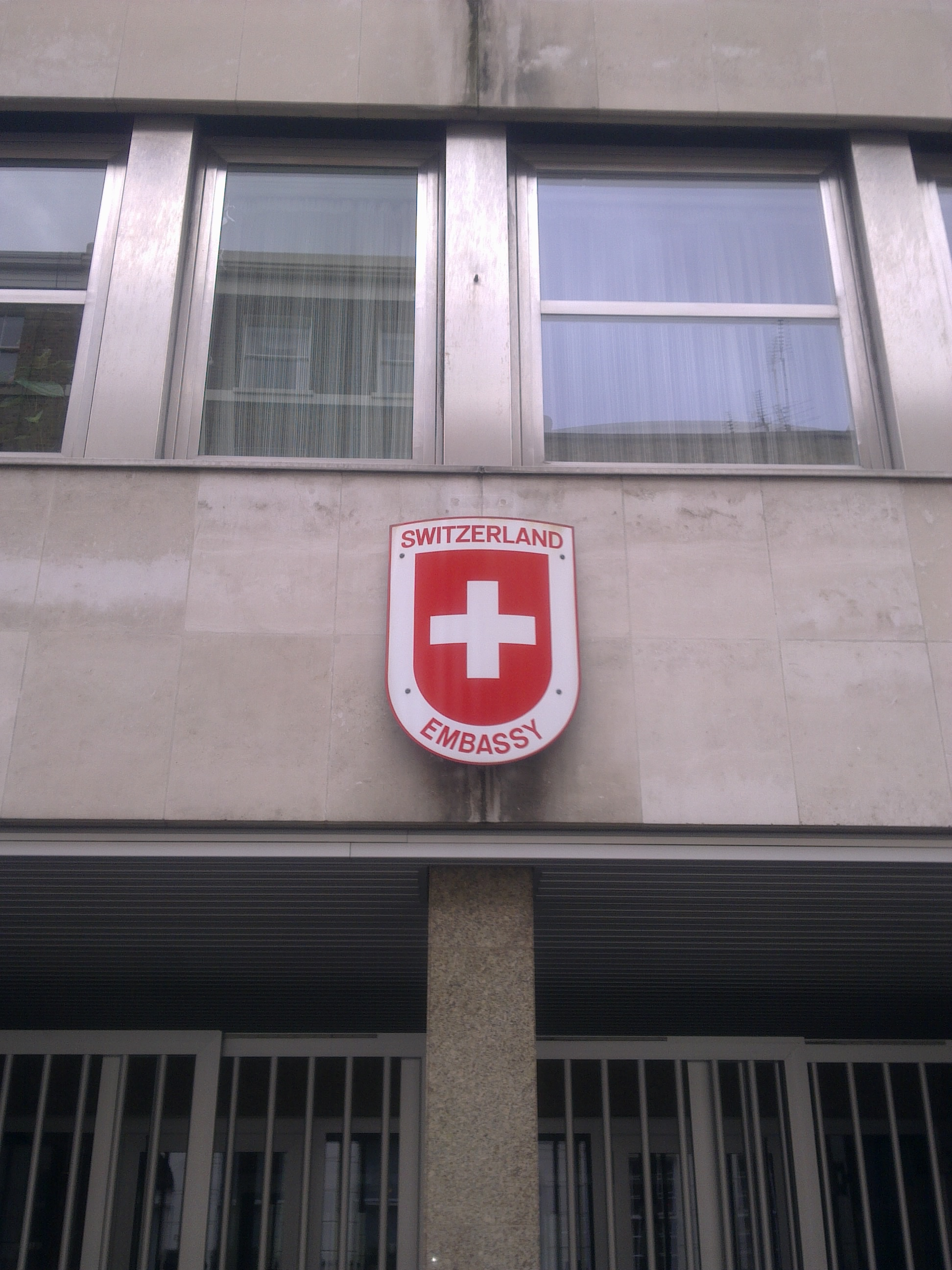
Plaque outside the embassy depicting the Coat of arms of Switzerland

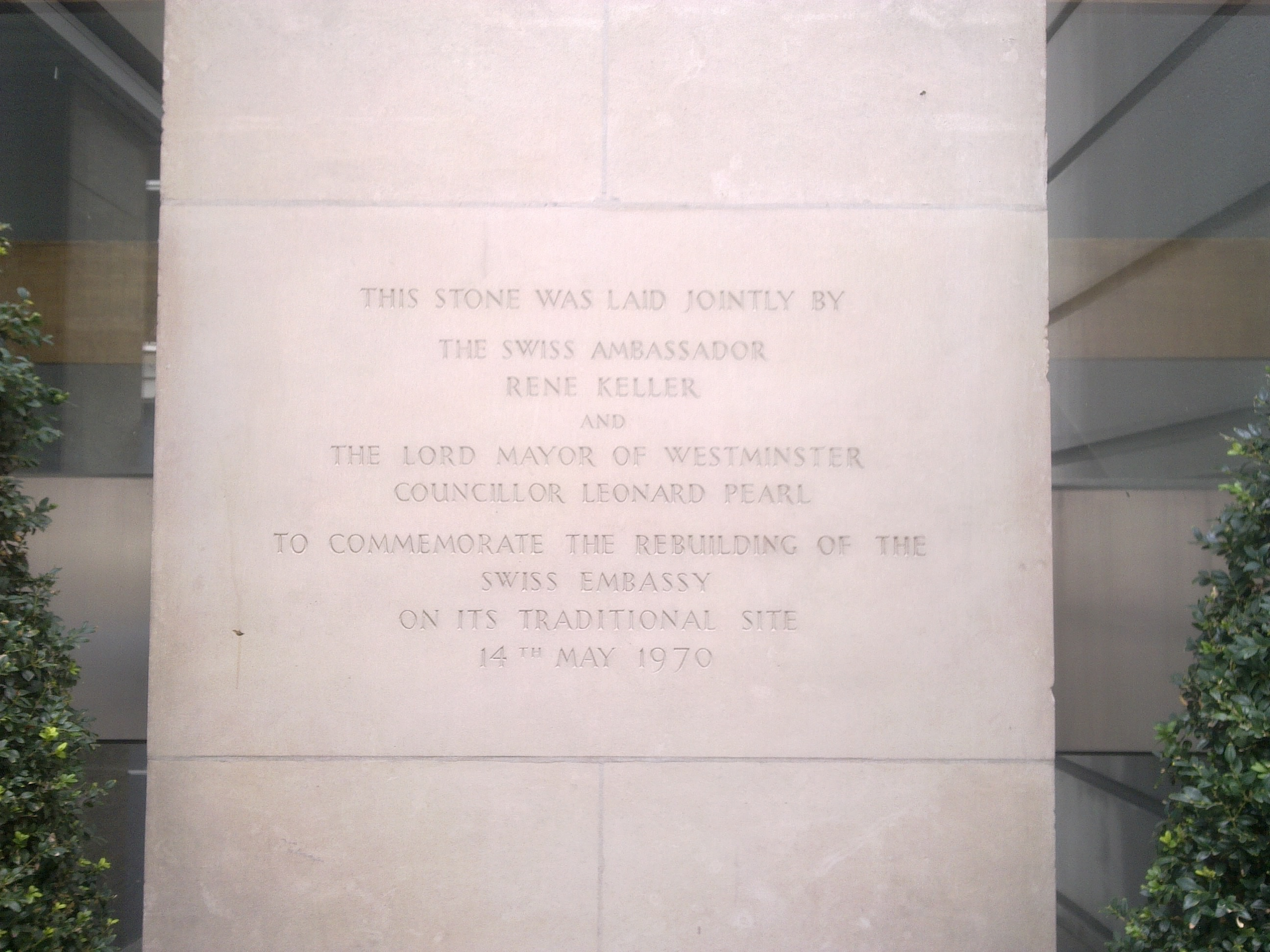
Commemorative stone outside the embassy

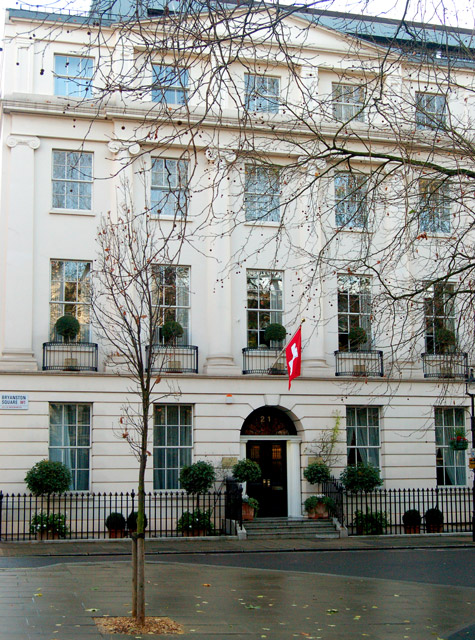
Residence of the Amabassador of Switzerland on 21 Bryanston Square

== See also ==
- Foreign relations of Switzerland
- List of diplomatic missions of Switzerland
