= 12 Arnold Grove =

Childhood home of George Harrison in Liverpool, England

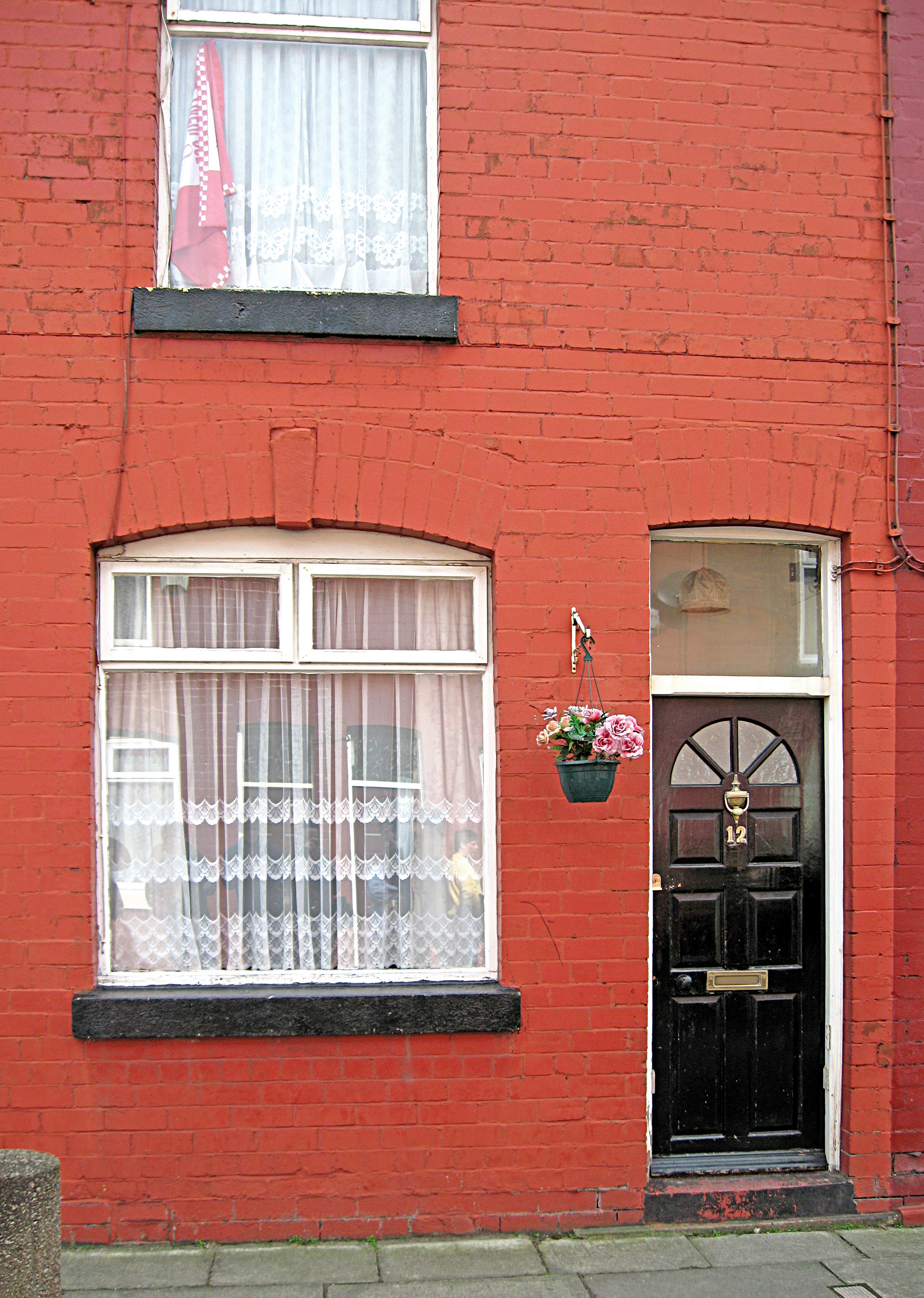
- 12 Arnold Grove in March 2008
- Interactive map of the 12 Arnold Grove area

General information
- Type: Terraced house
- Architectural style: Victorian
- Location: 12 Arnold Grove, Liverpool, L15 8HP
- Coordinates: 53°23′56″N 2°55′00″W

12 Arnold Grove is the birthplace and early childhood home of former Beatle George Harrison. Located in Wavertree, Liverpool, near Picton Clock Tower, it is a small terraced house in a cul-de-sac, with a small alley to the rear. Harrison's parents, Harold and Louise, moved to the house in 1931 following their marriage. The rent was ten shillings a week. Here their four children were born: Louise (16 August 1931 – 29 January 2023), Harry (20 July 1934-), Peter (20 July 1940 – 1 June 2007) and George (25 February 1943 – 29 November 2001).

Harrison lived in the property for seven years, by the end of which his family had been living there for nearly 20 years. They finally moved out to 25 Upton Green in the Speke district of Liverpool in 1950. His eldest brother Harry recalled: "Our little house was just two rooms up and two rooms down, but, except for a short period when our father was away at sea, we always knew the comfort and security of a very close-knit home life."

Harrison recalled that the only heating was a single coal fire, and the house was so cold in winter that he and his brothers dreaded getting up in the morning because it was freezing cold and they had to use the outside toilet. The house had tiny rooms – only ten feet by ten (three metres by three; 100 ft^{2}, about 9 m^{2}) – and a small iron cooking stove in the back room, which was used as a kitchen. Describing the back garden, Harrison wrote it had "a one-foot [30-centimetre] wide flowerbed, a toilet, a dustbin fitted to the back wall (and) a little hen house where we kept cockerels."

Harrison once said of the house, "Try and imagine the soul entering the womb of a woman living at 12 Arnold Grove, Wavertree, Liverpool 15. There were all the barrage balloons, and the Germans bombing Liverpool. All that was going on. I sat outside the house a couple of years ago, imagining 1943, nipping through the spiritual world, the astral level, getting back into a body in that house. That really is strange when you consider the whole planet, all the planets there may be on a spiritual level. How do I come into that family, in that house at that time, and who am I anyway?"

In February 2024, it was announced that the home would receive a blue plaque, one of the first located outside of London; this was installed on 24 May 2024.

== See also ==
- Kinfauns – later Harrison home
- Friar Park – later Harrison home
- 251 Menlove Avenue – Childhood home of Beatle John Lennon, a National Trust property
- 20 Forthlin Road – Not the birthplace, but the later family home of Beatle Paul McCartney, another National Trust property
- 10 Admiral Grove – Ringo Starr's childhood home
