= 251 Menlove Avenue =

Childhood home of John Lennon in Liverpool, England

Mendips, Menlove Avenue
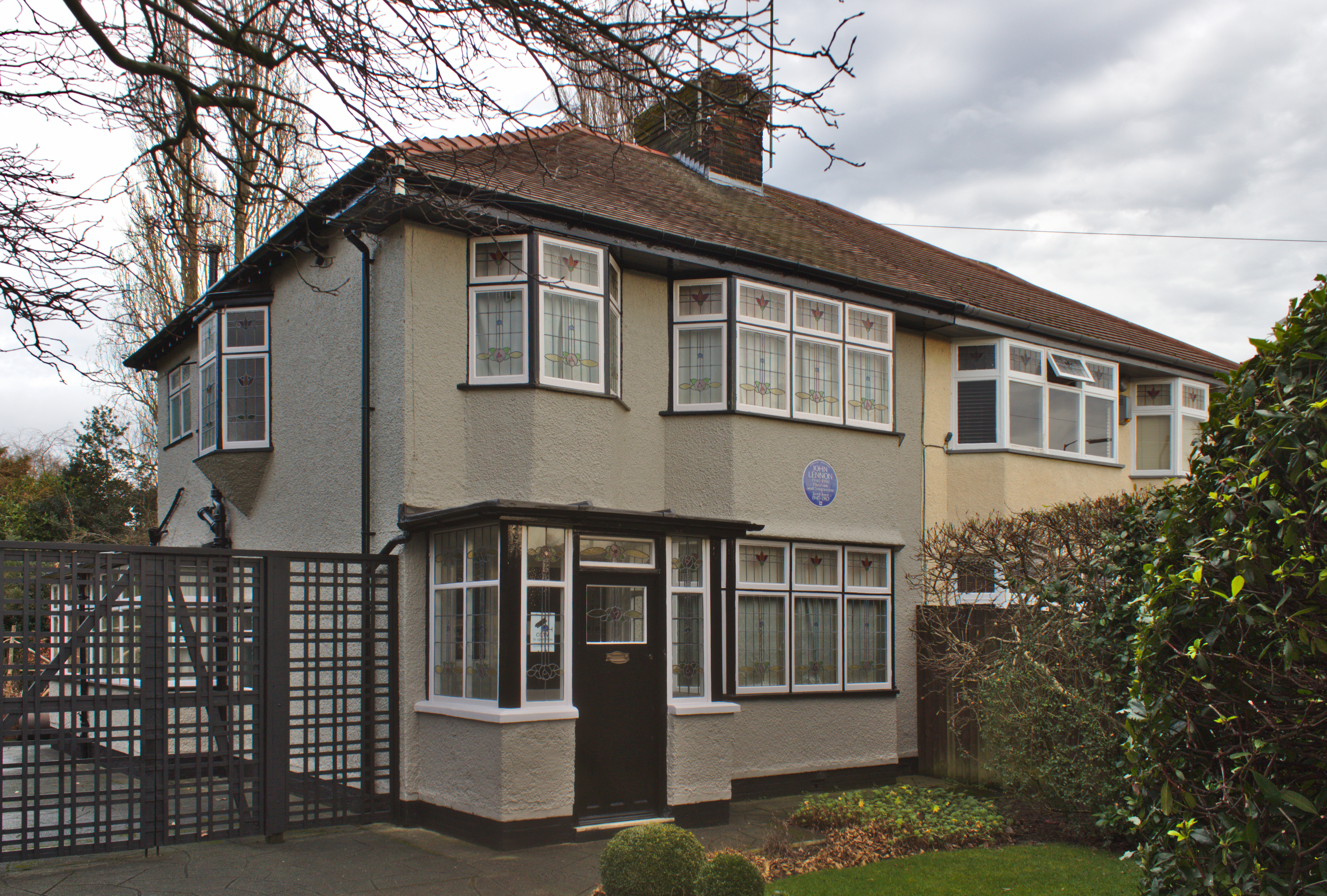
- Mendips, the childhood home of John Lennon

General information
- Type: Semi-detached
- Location: 251 Menlove Avenue, Liverpool, L25 7SA
- Coordinates: 53°22′38″N 2°52′53″W
- Owner: National Trust

Website
- www.nationaltrust.org.uk/beatles-childhood-homes/

251 Menlove Avenue is the childhood home of the Beatles' John Lennon. Located in the Woolton suburb of Liverpool, it was named Mendips after the Mendip Hills. The Grade II listed building is preserved by the National Trust.

== Residence of John Lennon ==
The 1933-built semi-detached property, which belonged to John Lennon's aunt Mimi and her husband George Smith, is in Woolton, south Liverpool. Lennon moved there in July 1946 at the age of five from 9 Newcastle Road in the nearby suburb of Wavertree. He lived at Mendips after his mother, who was living with her boyfriend, was persuaded that it would be better for his Aunt Mimi and George to take care of him. He remained at Mendips until mid-1963, when he was 22 years old. It was approximately 30 metres north west of this house that Lennon's mother Julia was hit by a car and killed on the evening of 15 July 1958.

In 1965 Mimi sold the property, taking away some of the furnishings and giving away others.

== National Trust acquisition ==
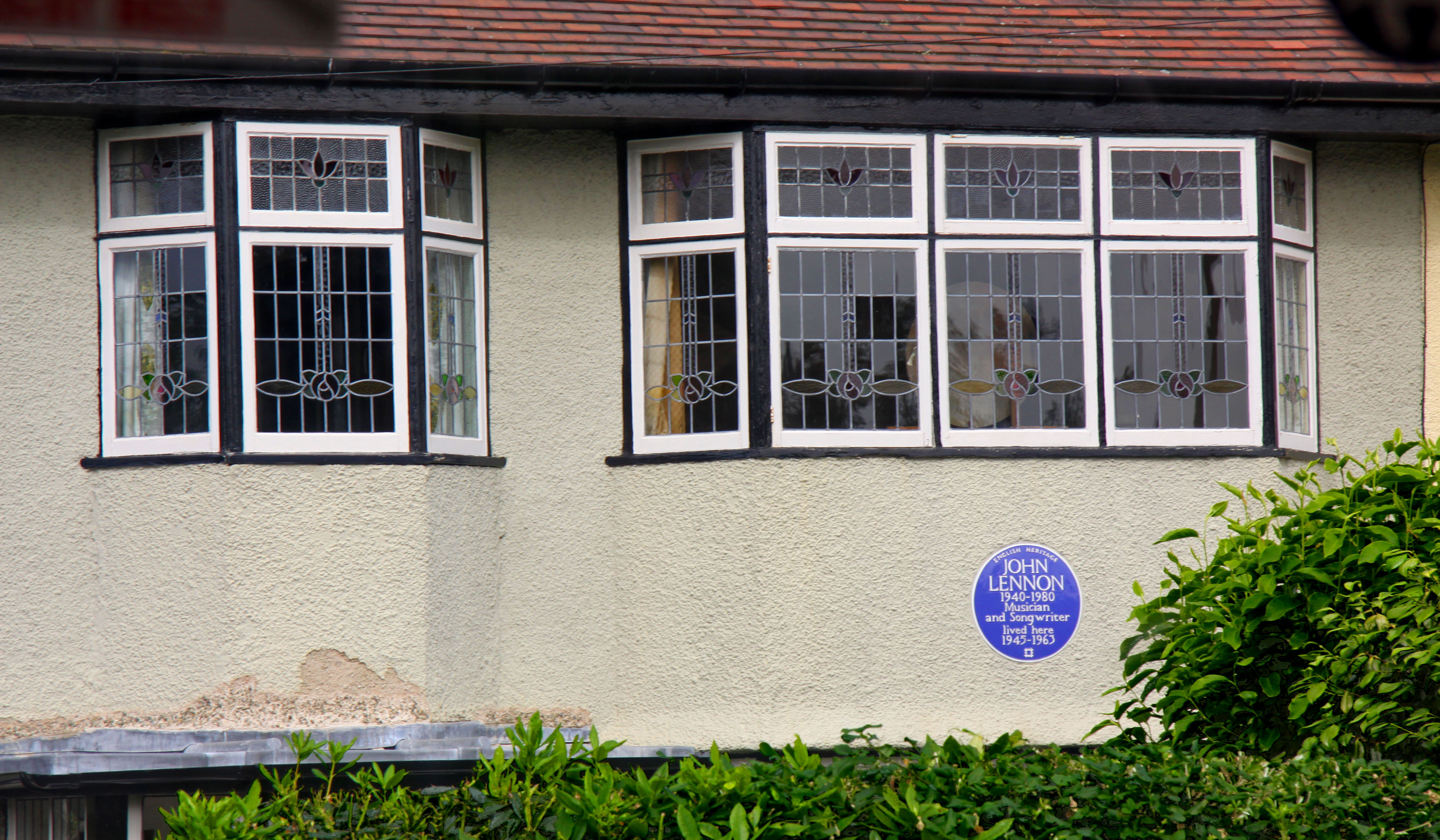
Lennon's bedroom was upstairs, left. The blue plaque was added as part of the English Heritage scheme.

Despite having purchased 20 Forthlin Road, the childhood residence of Paul McCartney, the National Trust showed no interest in acquiring Mendips, claiming that, unlike McCartney's home, no Beatles songs had been composed there. However, McCartney recalls at least one song, "I'll Get You", being written there. "Please Please Me" was also written there.

During the filming of the American TV film In His Life: The John Lennon Story in 2000, the then-owner of the house allowed the film crew inside, and also allowed them to knock down a downstairs wall to make room for the cameras. This resulted in 150 bricks being removed, which were later sold to Beatles fans.

On 7 December 2000, the day before the 20th anniversary of John Lennon's death, 251 Menlove Avenue was adorned with an English Heritage blue plaque, carrying the text "JOHN LENNON 1940–1980 Musician and Songwriter lived here 1945–1963".

Lennon's widow Yoko Ono bought the house in March 2002, and donated it to the National Trust in order to save it from further demolition and property speculators. The house was then restored to its 1950s appearance. At a joint press conference with the National Trust in March 2003, when it was announced that the restoration work was finished and the house would be opened to the public, Yoko Ono said: "When John's house came up for sale I wanted to preserve it for the people of Liverpool and John Lennon and Beatles fans all over the world."

Every year on the anniversary of his birthday (9 October) and death (8 December), the National Trust leave the bedroom light on in John Lennon's childhood home, all night.

In February 2012, both this house and Paul McCartney's childhood home at 20 Forthlin Road were Grade II listed by English Heritage.

== In popular culture ==
- The house is featured on the sleeve of Oasis' single "Live Forever".
- Menlove Ave. is a John Lennon album, posthumously released in 1986 under the supervision of Yoko Ono.

== See also ==
- 12 Arnold Grove: childhood home of George Harrison
- 10 Admiral Grove: childhood home of Ringo Starr
- 20 Forthlin Road: childhood home of Paul McCartney
- Kenwood
- Tittenhurst Park
- The Dakota
