= Kinfauns =

Large house in Surrey, England

Coordinates: 51.35960°N 0.36848°W

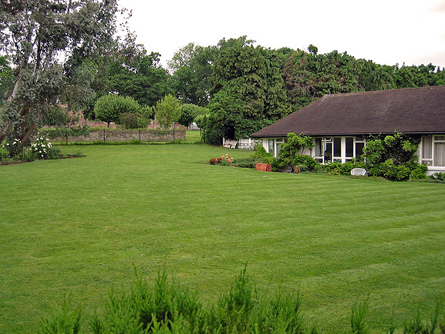
- View of George Harrison and Pattie Boyd's former home Kinfauns
- Interactive map of the Kinfauns area

General information
- Architectural style: Bungalow
- Location: Kinfauns /(or) 16, Claremont Drive, Esher, Surrey, KT10 9LU, Esher, Surrey, England
- Completed: 1950s
- Demolished: 2003

Kinfauns was a large 1950s deluxe bungalow in Esher in the English county of Surrey, on the Claremont Estate. From 1964 to 1970, it was the home of George Harrison, lead guitarist of the Beatles. It was where many of the demo recordings for the band's 1968 self-titled double album (also known as the "White Album") were made. The bungalow has since been demolished, and another house built in its place.

== Purchase by Harrison ==
Harrison bought Kinfauns for £20,000 (equivalent to £350,000 in 2025) on 17 July 1964, on the advice of Walter Strach, the Beatles' accountant. Going house-hunting, Harrison said later, "It was the first one I saw, and I thought, that'll do." He was joined there months later by his girlfriend Pattie Boyd. Harrison and Boyd were married on 21 January 1966, and lived in the house until 1970, when Harrison purchased Friar Park in Henley-on-Thames, Oxfordshire.

== Renovation ==
During 1967, Harrison and Boyd painted the outside of the house in psychedelic patterns; a mural around the fireplace was created by design collective the Fool, who also painted several Beatles musical instruments and Harrison's Radford Mini de Ville GT. At the rear of the house was a guitar-shaped swimming pool, while gold discs and the awards the band had achieved adorned the sitting room walls. In front, a tall 15-foot (4.6 m) sliding door kept unauthorised visitors out of the garden. The door was soon covered in fans' signatures and autographs.

== Beatles gatherings ==
Kinfauns was probably the home the Beatles gathered at most, as it was only a short drive from the homes of John Lennon (Kenwood) and Ringo Starr (Sunny Heights), both in St George's Hill. It was where Harrison, Lennon and their wives retreated during their first LSD experience in 1965, and in May 1968, it was where many of the demo recordings for the White Album were made, on Harrison's Ampex four-track tape recorder. These demos have been released on various bootleg albums; seven of them appear on the Beatles' Anthology 3 compilation album, and 27 appear on the 50th anniversary edition of The Beatles (also known as the "White Album") as the "Esher Demos" CD.

Harrison was the first Beatle to own or use a Moog synthesizer, and he recorded "Under the Mersey Wall" with his Moog at Kinfauns. The track filled one side of his Electronic Sound album, released in May 1969.

Kinfauns was where police arrested Boyd and Harrison for hashish possession in March 1969, as Lennon and Yoko Ono had been months earlier while staying at Starr's flat at Montagu Square in London. Both couples insisted the drugs found had been planted on the premises.

== Sale and demolition ==
After moving to Friar Park, Harrison sold Kinfauns; both houses were listed as assets of the Beatles' company Apple Corps. It was later home to songwriter Barry Mason and wife Sylvan Mason.

The site of Kinfauns lies within the historic garden walls of the adjacent Claremont, a 19th-century royal residence. Following a series of planning applications in the early 21st century, the bungalow was substantially demolished in 2003 and replaced with a new two-storey house, though the windows of the studio were incorporated into the new structure.

== See also ==
- 12 Arnold Grove, Harrison birthplace and boyhood home
