= Bryanston Square =

Square in Marylebone, Westminster, London, England

Coordinates: 51°31′03″N 0°09′39″W

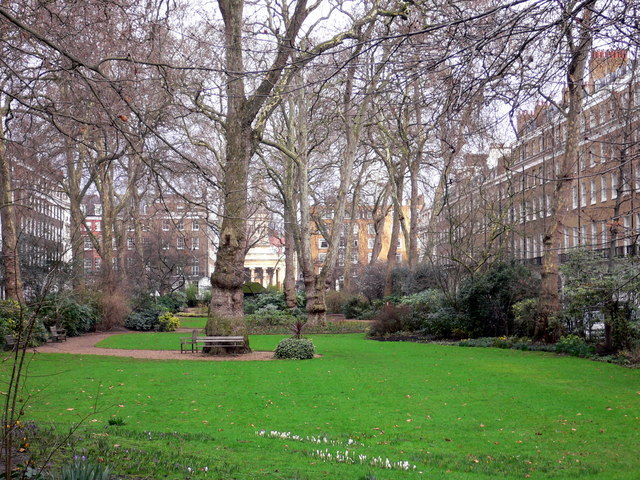
The green centre and west, north and east façades of some of the square and the round portico cupola of the church on the horizon after the rectangle has narrowed to form Wyndham Place.

A map showing the Bryanston Square ward of St Marylebone Metropolitan Borough as it appeared in 1916.

Bryanston Square is an 800-by-200-foot (244 by 61 m) garden square in Marylebone, London. Terraced buildings surround it — often merged, converted or sub-divided, some of which remain residential. The southern end has the William Pitt Byrne memorial fountain. Next to both ends are cycle parking spaces.

The most notable merged building is the Swiss Embassy at the north-east end. The square's narrow northern and southern ends are joined by broad approach streets of the same British Regency date. More recent style flanks the mid-west range of the square in the form of No.s 31, 32 and 33 which are three times an ordinary range of its widths, meaning the numbering scheme today skips ten following numbers, destroyed to make room for these, to culminate with No.s 44 to 50 and the highest-numbered buildings of Great Cumberland Place – its corner houses, No.s 63 and 68. That street, this square and Wyndham Place run broad and straight for 750 metres without building projections between an 1821-built church and Marble Arch, moved to its permanent site in 1851.

Traffic circulates clockwise around the square and numbering runs anti-clockwise.

== Amenities and neighbours ==
=== Wyndham Place ===
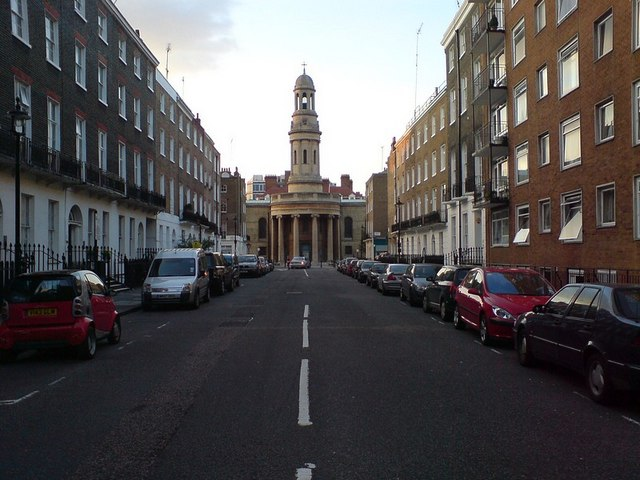
Wyndham Place from the square's north end that overlaps Crawford Street

Wyndham Place (its mainstay No.s 1 to 16) including front, railed space of its buildings forms a purposeful gap (known building line) 60 feet (18 m) across which runs north from that end of the square to become a 190-foot-wide forecourt, with seated areas, to the Church of St Mary's – built in 1821 to designs by Robert Smirke. The church is Grade I listed. Its No.s 3 to 6 and 9 to 16 are alike light-brown brick terraces with white, ashlar-style stucco to the lower floors, by Parkinson, and completed by 1823, they are Grade II listed (this is the lowest and dominant of three categories).

=== Great Cumberland Place ===
This equally broad street with parking spaces flanking runs 350 metres (1,150 ft) south. Mid-way it broadens into a green crescent, Wallenberg Place, the arc of which is fronted by five buildings including Western Marble Arch Synagogue. The thoroughfare culminates with, across an approach to Oxford Street, Marble Arch aligned just off-centre before which, flanking, are: Cumberland Court and the Cumberland Hotel, which incorporates the entrance to the Marble Arch tube station and a walkway to Hyde Park. Its predominant use classes are homes and hotels.

=== Architectural context and features ===
The square, taken at its greatest, is 2/3 the size of Portman Square. It has roads, broad pavements and a private tree-planted garden. Wetherby Preparatory School occupies part of the south west corner. Listed are:

- the east side, №s 1 to 21 and so 1A
- the north-west side, №s 25, 25A and 26
- most of the west side:
  - №s 27, 27A, 28, 29, 30, 31, 32
  - №s 44 to 48
- the south-west side, *№s 49, 50 and 63 Gt. Cumberland. Pl.
- the south-east side, 68 Great Cumberland Place

The neat (geometric) façades contrast with fluctuations in colour and height. Slightly varied ochre brickwork from building to building (historically referred to as 'yellow bricks') is accompanied in by differing mansard roofs, mostly of grey slate. A little facing red-brown brick is used. Decorative black balconies above the first level are accompanied by a white chamfered band course at the penultimate level before the mansard. At the divide of the mansards or parapet roofs with roof gardens is a longer such course forming a more pronounced white band course (the main cornice). All of the casements are tall white, multi-pane sash windows of uniform height and distribution. The first-listed above was finished in 1811 to designs by Joseph Parkinson. The doric and ionic orders are used but symmetry is stressed. No.s 10 to 12 and 19 to 21 were rebuilt to match, due to war damage.

In the south is the William Pitt Byrne Memorial Fountain, erected in 1862, a Grade II (initial category) listed monument under the statutory protection scheme, as is an ornamental water pump at the opposite end.

=== Ambassadorial presence ===
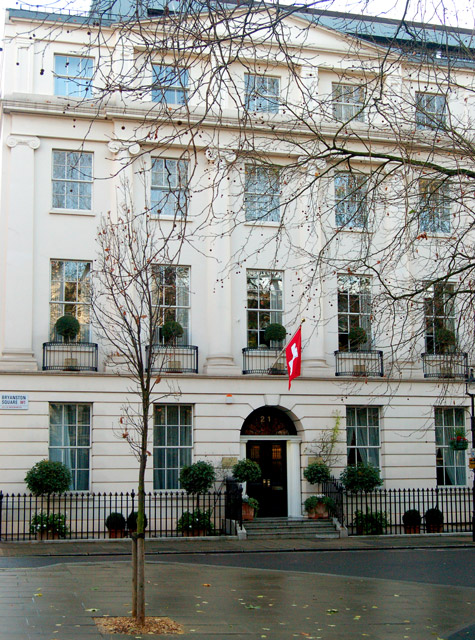
Swiss ambassador's residence

The Swiss Embassy in London is at 16/18 Montagu Place, with the ambassador's residence at № 21 Bryanston Square, formerly known as №s 16 to 22.

== History ==
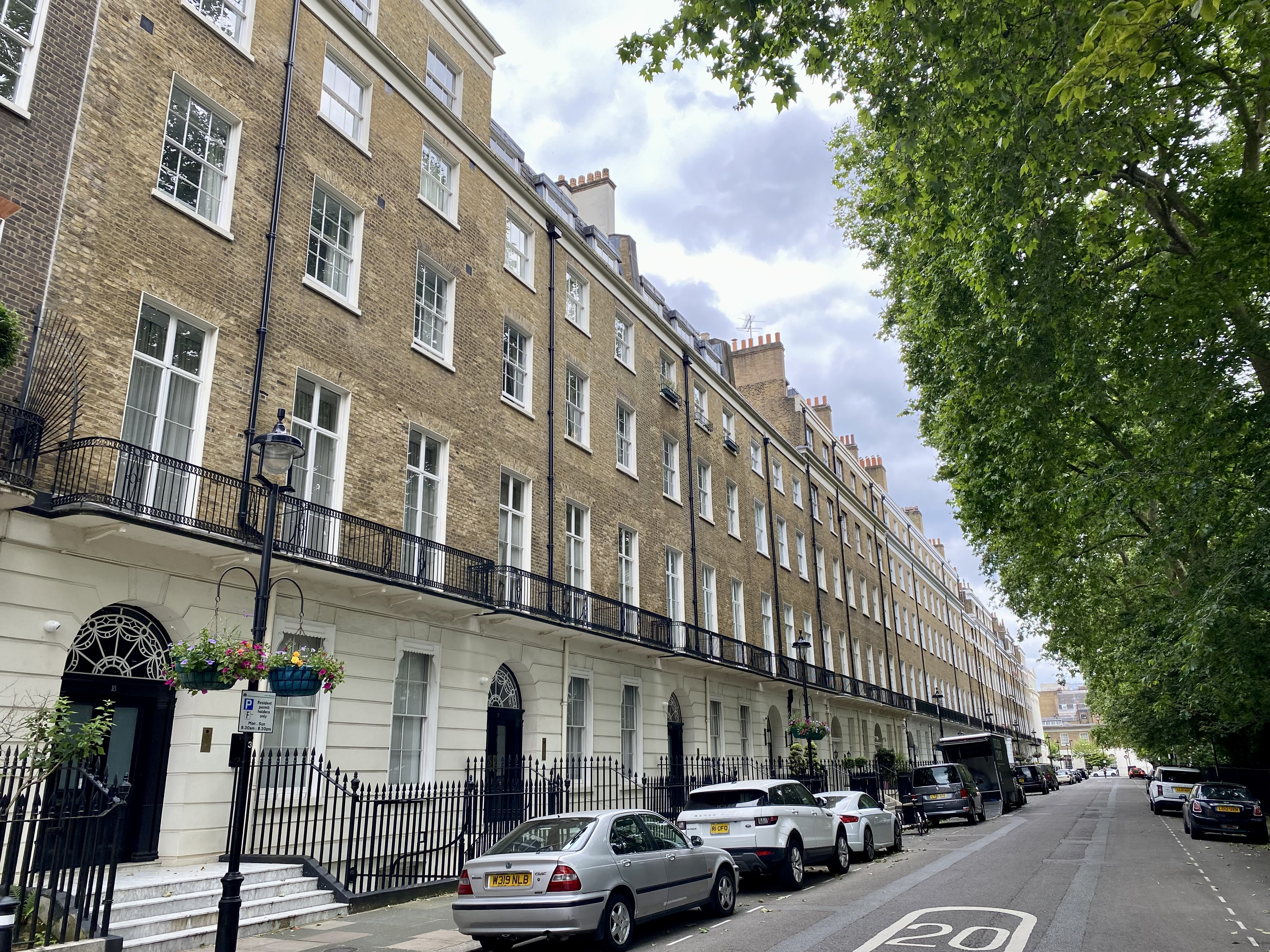
№ 1 to № 18, on the eastern row of Bryanston Square

Named after its founder Henry William Portman's village of Bryanston in Dorset, where he was lord of the manor, the square was built as part of the Portman Estate between 1810 and 1815, along with Montagu Square beyond the nominally-associated eastern Mews. Second-World-War bombing left parts of Bryanston Square in need of extensive repair. A local report in March 1946 noted that several houses on the east side, including No. 11, were still awaiting reinstatement under the War Damage Commission scheme. Estate papers held at the National Archives record the post-war repairs carried out to Nos 10–12.

=== Notable people ===
- George Shaw-Lefevre, 1st Baron Eversley (1831–1928) minister of state and co-founder of the Commons Preservation Society to protect among others Hampstead Heath and Epping Forest
- Mustafa Reşid Pasha in 1839, at № 1
- Osmond Barnes (1834–1930), Indian Army officer, was born at №7 on 23 December 1834. As Chief Herald of India he proclaimed Queen Victoria Empress of India at Delhi in 1877.
- Emma Elizabeth Thoyts (1860–1949) historian was born in a house on the square.
- Julia Duckworth (1846–1895, later Stephen) and her husband Herbert at №38, 1867–1870
- Abe Bailey (1864–1940) South African politician, businessman and sportsman, at №38. The talks which led to David Lloyd George succeeding H. H. Asquith as Prime Minister of the United Kingdom took place in Bailey's house in December 1916. (Note: Number 38 was demolished in 1940 due to damage during the Blitz)
- H Lyndoch Gardiner (1820–1897) Queen's Equerry, at №31.
- Sir Reginald Hanson, 1st Baronet, one of the two Members of Parliament for The City of London - 1891 to 1900. Bryanston Square was the territorial designation of this baronetcy, extinct 1996.
- Allan Octavian Hume, Indian Civil Services, born at 6 Bryanston Square
- 1st–3rd Lords Farrer, the first of whom was a senior civil servant statistician in the mid 19th century.
- Wallis Simpson, the future wife of Edward VIII lived at the square just before his abdication in December 1936.
- William Dodge James died at his home, №28.
- American Heiress Ellen Stager and her husband Arthur Butler, 4th Marquess of Ormonde, lived at №11 from 1925 and were still there in 1938.

=== Hospitals ===
- №s. 10–12 were opened by the Nuffield Nursing Homes Trust as the Fitzroy Nuffield Nursing Home in 1966, with 46 beds, two operating theatres, consulting rooms, and X-ray and pathology departments. This was renamed in 1983 as the Fitzroy Nuffield Hospital and closed in October 1996. In 1997, it was demolished, apart from the facade, and rebuilt as Ellerton House, an apartment block.
- № 48 was Lady Carnarvon's Hospital for Officers between 1916 and 1919. It was financed by Lady Carnarvon's godfather Alfred de Rothschild and opened in January 1916 with forty beds, after relocating from Highclere Castle.
- № 37 was a Royal Flying Corps Hospital between May 1916 and 1919 and had twenty beds. The house was lent by Lady Tredegar, and Princess Helena made contributions to it. Subsidiary to the main Royal Flying Corps Hospital in Dorset Square, in March 1917 it was visited by King George V and Queen Mary.

== Tributes ==
The Bryanston suburb of Johannesburg, South Africa, is named after the square.
