= Kenwood, St George's Hill =

House on the St. George's Hill estate, Weybridge

Coordinates: 51.355522°N 0.446335°W

Kenwood
- Interactive map of the Kenwood area

General information
- Architectural style: Tudor Revival
- Location: Weybridge, Surrey, England
- Completed: 1913
- Client: Norman H. Johnson

Design and construction
- Architect: Theophilus Arthur Allen

Kenwood is a house on the St George's Hill estate, Weybridge, Surrey, England. Originally called the Brown House, it was designed by architect T. A. Allen, and built in 1913 by Love & Sons, a local building firm. The estate was constructed around the Weybridge Golf Club, which was designed in 1912 by Harry Colt.

John Lennon, of the Beatles, bought Kenwood for £20,000 (equivalent to £354,200 in 2025) on 15 July 1964, on the advice of the Beatles' accountants, Walter Strach and James Isherwood. Lennon was resident from the summer of 1964 until the late spring of 1968. Film of the gate and the exterior of the house was included in an ITN programme called Reporting 66 in 1966. Parts of a home movie showing Lennon at Kenwood in 1967 were featured in the 1988 documentary film Imagine: John Lennon.

Kenwood is close to Sunny Heights, the former home of Ringo Starr, and a short drive from Kinfauns, George Harrison's former home in Esher. In October 2006, Kenwood went back on the market at a price of £5.95 million; it was sold in January 2007 for £5.8 million.

== History ==
Located on Wood Lane, off Cavendish Road, Kenwood was built in a mock-Tudor style in 1913, and was originally called The Brown House. The footprint and gardens cover 1.5 acres (0.61 ha), of which—under the rules of the building scheme—the house must occupy no more than one fifth and the plot may not be subdivided into more than one home. It was designed in 1913 by architect Theophilus Arthur Allen, who had been commissioned by local man Norman H. Johnson. Allen employed a local firm called Love & Sons in the construction of Kenwood. The hill was divided into lots around the Weybridge Golf Club, which was designed by Harry Colt in 1912. Many of the original houses on the estate were built by master builder Walter George Tarrant, whose firm constructed Kenwood's original external garage c. 1920 (it was demolished c. 1995).

== Purchase and renovations by John Lennon ==
John Lennon bought the house on 15 July 1964, on the advice of the Beatles' accountants, Walter Strach and James Isherwood. Cliff Richard and Tom Jones had earlier bought homes on the St George's Hill estate. Though reportedly not liking Kenwood (describing it as a "stop-over" on the way to something better), Lennon spent £40,000 (were it cash for ordinary expenditure equivalent to £708,000 in 2025) on renovations, reducing its 22 rooms to 17, landscaping the grounds, and building an outdoor swimming pool, constructed by a local skilled tradesman, Fred Borley. Much of the initial decoration was left to interior designer Kenneth Partridge, whom Lennon employed after being impressed by his design work at a lavish party held by Beatles' manager Brian Epstein to celebrate the Beatles' departure for their first tour of the United States. However, when Partridge had completed his work, Lennon and then-wife Cynthia immediately made a number of further alterations which better reflected their taste. Cynthia's mother was given an allowance to fill the shelves of the house with antiques and antiquarian books, and a heavy sliding wooden door was installed at the gate entrance to keep out fans.

Kenwood has three floors. On the ground floor during the Lennon period the front door opened onto an entrance hall, wherein Lennon placed a suit of armour and a gorilla suit. Across the hall was a large living room, which had black carpets, two 18-foot sofas and a marble fireplace. To the left of the hall was a toilet, and through the living room was a dining room, where purple velvet wallpaper was put up. Adjacent to the dining room, at the back of the house, was a small sunroom. This was decorated with various pictures, caricatures and stickers, such as the one from Safe as Milk (the 1967 debut album by Captain Beefheart & His Magic Band) and one advertising the Monterey Pop Festival. Photos published by The Beatles Book Monthly show the shelves of the sunroom filled with articles such as a large, ornate cross, a Mickey Mouse doll, and a mortar and pestle, reportedly used by Lennon to mix various combinations of cocaine, amphetamine, barbiturates and LSD. There was also a yellow sofa or chaise-longue upon which Lennon would spend much of his time. This was a present from his aunt Elizabeth Smith (née Stanley), also known as Mimi. Behind the sunroom was the split-level kitchen where state-of-the-art appliances were installed, so complex that a tutor had to come and give the Lennons lessons in their use.

Completing the ground floor was a smaller lounge, and a large garage. The main staircase to the upper floors was situated in the entrance hall. The house had six bedrooms, with five on the first floor. The giant master bedroom featured a huge double bed, white carpets and an en-suite bathroom complete with sunken bathtub, shower, Jacuzzi and 'his and hers' wash basins. Lennon wanted the guest bedrooms to contain works of art by students of the Liverpool Art College. In particular, two drawings by late Beatles' bassist Stuart Sutcliffe were hung, for what Lennon described as "sentimental reasons". The first floor also had a study. On the top floor was the attic, which Lennon claimed as his own, painting the ceiling one bright colour, then changing to another when the paint ran out, and installing most of his musical equipment there. Outside the house, seen to the right when looking down from the sunroom, lay the swimming pool. In 1967, Lennon suggested a mirrored bottom for the pool; being advised that this would be not only impractical and expensive, but potentially dangerous to swimmers, he settled for a large eye mosaic set in the side. The mosaic was based on the Eye of Knowledge, which was part of the teachings of the Maharishi Mahesh Yogi.

=== Staff ===
The Lennons initially had problems recruiting reliable staff, but eventually employed a cook/housekeeper (Dorothy Jarlett, or Dot), a chauffeur (Les Anthony), and a groundskeeper. Lennon was surprised and impressed to discover that the groundskeeper had "dropped out" of university to pursue his love of horticulture. Others employed at Kenwood included Lennon's schoolfriend Pete Shotton, who worked as his personal assistant in the early part of 1968, and Pauline Jones, who was the girlfriend (later wife) of Lennon's father, Alfred Lennon. Jones worked as an au pair and secretary, answering the large volume of fan mail received at Kenwood, during late 1967.

=== Songwriting ===
Lennon did much of his songwriting in the attic, where he had several Studer tape recorders. Little was done with them until fellow Beatle Paul McCartney visited and helped re-install them in sequence, so overdubs could be made. Lennon could thus record his own double-tracked song demos. (These demos, and some other, more avant garde sound recordings also made in the attic, have appeared on various bootlegs). The attic also contained a mellotron, an electronic organ, a piano, a Vox AC30 amplifier and several guitars (including his first Rickenbacker 325, a Höfner Senator, and a Rickenbacker 1996), all of which were used when songwriting. Lennon also wrote on an upright piano in the sunroom.

=== Recreation ===
Aside from the mini-studio, the attic contained two other rooms: a small guest bedroom and a games room used for recreation. Lennon filled it with three full sets of the model car racing game Scalextric. When not in the attic, Lennon could usually be found in the sunroom watching television or reading newspapers. He would also walk in the garden with his black cat on his shoulder (he had ten cats in total). His drug intake, particularly LSD and hashish, but also amphetamine, was high for much of the time he lived at Kenwood. Drugs were taken there in the company of people such as Marianne Faithfull's ex-husband John Dunbar and art dealer Robert Fraser. At one stage, under the influence of transcendental meditation, Lennon renounced both meat-eating and drugs, and buried a huge quantity of LSD in the garden, which had been obtained by representatives of the Beatles at the Monterey Pop Festival from Augustus Stanley Owsley III. He later tried to find the LSD, but could not remember where he had buried it. Although none of the lavish parties they had planned took place – which remained a source of disappointment to Cynthia – various guests (including Monkee Michael Nesmith and his wife Phyllis, Bob Dylan and Peter Cook) stayed or dined at the house, together with old friends like Ivan Vaughan and Shotton from Liverpool, or strangers Lennon had met at a party or nightclub, such as the Ad Lib. Cynthia and Lennon were beginning to lead separate lives by 1967, and it was not uncommon for Cynthia to wake up in the morning to find the house filled with people in various states of intoxication whom Lennon had met the previous night in clubs. Large parts of the house were unused by the Lennons, and visitors remarked that there was frequently a strange atmosphere.

=== Lennon, Yoko Ono, and Cynthia ===
In 1968, Cynthia went on vacation to Greece, leaving Lennon at Kenwood with Shotton. After several days of taking LSD and smoking marijuana, Lennon convened a meeting at the Beatles' business HQ to inform the others that he felt he was the reincarnation of Jesus Christ. Later that day he phoned his artist friend Yoko Ono, whose husband Tony Cox was in Paris on business, and invited her to Kenwood. Shotton left the two alone, whereupon Lennon invited Ono (who had also taken LSD) up to the attic to hear his largely experimental non-Beatles recordings. For the rest of the night the two collaborated on what became the Two Virgins album, and then "made love at dawn", according to Lennon. Cynthia returned early from her vacation, and discovered Lennon and Ono sitting cross-legged on the floor and staring intently into each other's eyes (Ono was wearing one of Cynthia's bathrobes). In a state of shock, Cynthia then left to stay with friends for a few days, although Lennon and Cynthia were reconciled for a time upon her return to Kenwood.

It was during Cynthia's next holiday in Italy that Lennon and Ono finally entered into a permanent relationship, and Lennon asked for a divorce. Cynthia, together with Julian and her mother, moved back into Kenwood for the summer, where Paul McCartney visited her to offer his support. On the journey to Kenwood he composed the song "Hey Jude", which eventually became the Beatles' biggest-selling single. Lennon and Ono, meanwhile, were without a permanent address for a time. They stayed with McCartney at his house in Cavendish Avenue and with Peter Brown and then Neil Aspinall, before moving into an apartment leased by Ringo Starr at 34 Montagu Square, Marylebone, in London. They were evicted from this flat by the owner following a raid by the drug squad on 18 October 1968, and subsequent November trial, and so moved back into Kenwood for a short time, which had been vacated by Cynthia. In the new year Ono and Lennon moved into the Dorchester Hotel in London, leaving Kenwood for the last time.

=== Film/interview/photos ===
Film of the exterior of the house and the gate was included in Reporting 66, a programme produced by ITN, in 1966. Parts of a home movie showing Lennon at Kenwood, in 1967, were featured in the film Imagine: John Lennon. This had Lennon in the company of his son Julian Lennon, Starr, and the gardener at Kenwood. It also shows Lennon standing in the sunroom. Lennon and Yoko Ono were filmed at the side of the house singing the "Everybody had a hard year" section of the Beatles' song "I've Got a Feeling", and made two art films in the grounds in 1968: Number 5 a.k.a. Smile, and Two Virgins. Lennon was interviewed several times on audio tape at Kenwood; interviewers included Ray Coleman and Kenny Everett. Several photo sessions also took place at Kenwood, the most famous of which provided the cover photo for the Beatles' 1965 album Rubber Soul.

== Kenwood after the Lennons ==
As Lennon and Cynthia were getting divorced, it became clear that Lennon did not wish to keep Kenwood, and Cynthia could not afford to maintain it on her own, so it was sold in December 1968, for a reputed £40,000 (equivalent to £611,700 in 2025). to Bill Martin, writer of songs such as "Puppet on a String" and "Congratulations". Kenwood has had a succession of owners, and some major renovations. The interior now little resembles the house in which Lennon lived. The sunroom has been completely rebuilt. The exterior and grounds are similar. After being displayed at the Liverpool International Garden Festival in 1984, the psychedelic eye mosaic was unclaimed, and left in a field. It was rediscovered and restored by Tom Lorimer, a laboratory technician at the Liverpool John Moores University, to be displayed at the Museum of Liverpool Life. Items from Lennon's Kenwood period have also appeared for auction, including towels and cutlery, a caviar jar, and the table that sat in the sunroom. Lennon kept the Kenwood house sign after he left, but gave it to Andy Eccles, a gardener at Tittenhurst Park, in 1972. It was sold for US$20,400 in 2003. In October 2006, Kenwood went back on the market, initially seeking up to £150,000 more, was sold early the following year for £5.8 million. It has been claimed each owner after the Lennons has sold it owing to divorce.

== See also ==
- 251 Menlove Avenue
- Tittenhurst Park
- The Dakota
