= Amoeba Gig =

2019 Live album by Paul McCartney

Live album by Paul McCartney
- Released: 12 July 2019
- Recorded: 27 June 2007
- Venue: Amoeba Music
- Genre: Rock
- Length: 79:00
- Label: Capitol Records
- Producer: Steve Orchard; Randy Merrill; Darrell Thorp

Paul McCartney chronology
Wings 1971–73 (2018)	Amoeba Gig (2019)	McCartney III (2020)

Professional ratings
Review scores
Source	Rating
AllMusic	3.5/5 stars

Amoeba Gig is a live album by Paul McCartney taken from the recordings of a secret performance at Amoeba Music in Hollywood, California, on 27 June 2007, and released in July 2019. Tracks from the recordings were previously released in 2007 on Amoeba's Secret and as B-sides to the single "Ever Present Past". The album features the complete concert recording of that secret performance.

== Previous releases ==
=== Amoeba's Secret ===
Amoeba's Secret

Live album by Paul McCartney
- Released: November 2007
- Recorded: 27 June 2007

Paul McCartney chronology
Memory Almost Full (2007)	Amoeba's Secret (2007)	Electric Arguments (2008)

Paul McCartney and his touring band played a secret show at Amoeba Music in Hollywood, California, as part of the promotion for Memory Almost Full on 27 June 2007. The performance was later released in November 2007 as Amoeba's Secret, a limited edition 12" vinyl record. The low-resolution album art is intentional, as to make the EP resemble a bootleg recording. The back of the sleeve features an incomplete word search whose letters contain hidden details of the recording.

In January 2009 it received wider release on CD and download formats.

=== "Ever Present Past" single ===
Three tracks from the Amoeba's Secret release were also released as B-sides for the "Ever Present Past" single in November 2007.

=== Live in Los Angeles ===
The Live in Los Angeles album was released only in the United Kingdom and Ireland through a special promotion run in 2010 by The Mail on Sunday and the Irish Sunday Mail. Four of the album's twelve tracks (2, 4, 5, and 12) were previously released on Amoeba's Secret, while track 3 was previously released as the b-side to the "Ever Present Past" single.

On 16 November 2012, the Paul McCartney website released an extended version of the Amoeba show titled Live in Los Angeles – The Extended Set free to "premium" members of the website, adding the songs "Nod Your Head" and "House of Wax" to the tracklisting, the latter also being a b-side to the "Ever Present Past" single.

== Amoeba Gig ==
The complete Amoeba Gig show, with all 21 songs and remixed by McCartney's engineer Steve Orchard, was finally released on 12 July 2019 on CD, vinyl, and digital download.

== Track listing ==
For Amoeba's secret:

1. "Only Mama Knows" (Paul McCartney) – 3:47
2. "C Moon" (P. McCartney, Linda McCartney) – 3:17
3. "That Was Me" (P. McCartney) – 3:03
4. "I Saw Her Standing There" (Lennon–McCartney) – 3:25

For Live in Los Angeles:

1. "Drive My Car" (John Lennon, Paul McCartney) – 2:33
2. "Only Mama Knows" (McCartney) – 3:54
3. "Dance Tonight" (McCartney) – 3:09
4. "C Moon" (McCartney, Linda McCartney) – 3:22
5. "That Was Me" (McCartney) – 3:02
6. "Blackbird" (Lennon, McCartney) – 2:37
7. "Here Today" (McCartney) – 2:38
8. "Back in the U.S.S.R." (Lennon, McCartney) – 2:59
9. "Get Back" (Lennon, McCartney) – 3:53
10. "Hey Jude" (Lennon, McCartney) – 7:08
11. "Lady Madonna" (Lennon, McCartney) – 3:12
12. "I Saw Her Standing There" (McCartney, Lennon) – 3:25

For Live in Los Angeles – The Extended Set:

Live in Los Angeles – The Extended Set
No.	Title	Writer(s)	Length
1.	"Drive My Car"	Lennon–McCartney	2:33
2.	"Only Mama Knows"	Paul McCartney	3:54
3.	"Dance Tonight"	P. McCartney	3:10
4.	"C Moon"	P. McCartney, Linda McCartney	3:22
5.	"That Was Me"	P. McCartney	3:02
6.	"Blackbird"	Lennon–McCartney	2:37
7.	"Here Today"	P. McCartney	2:34
8.	"Back in the U.S.S.R."	Lennon–McCartney	3:02
9.	"Nod Your Head"	P. McCartney	1:20
10.	"House of Wax"	P. McCartney	5:08
11.	"Get Back"	Lennon–McCartney	3:52
12.	"Hey Jude"	Lennon–McCartney	7:09
13.	"Lady Madonna"	Lennon–McCartney	3:07
14.	"I Saw Her Standing There"	Lennon–McCartney	3:33
Total length:			48:15

For Amoeba Gig:

All tracks are written by Lennon-McCartney except where noted.

No.	Title	Length
1.	"Drive My Car"	2:41
2.	"Only Mama Knows" (Paul McCartney)	3:47
3.	"Dance Tonight" (McCartney)	3:25
4.	"C Moon" (Paul & Linda McCartney)	3:13
5.	"The Long and Winding Road"	3:34
6.	"I'll Follow the Sun"	2:56
7.	"Calico Skies" (McCartney)	2:57
8.	"That Was Me" (McCartney)	3:03
9.	"Blackbird"	3:44
10.	"Here Today" (McCartney)	3:13
11.	"Back in the U.S.S.R."	4:08
12.	"Nod Your Head" (McCartney)	2:00
13.	"House of Wax" (McCartney)	6:02
14.	"I've Got a Feeling"	5:56
15.	"Matchbox" (Carl Perkins)	3:31
16.	"Get Back"	4:21
17.	"Baby Face" (Harry Akst, Benny Davis)	0:54
18.	"Hey Jude"	8:01
19.	"Let It Be"	3:54
20.	"Lady Madonna"	3:34
21.	"I Saw Her Standing There"	3:25

Bonus track on the vinyl edition
No.	Title	Length
22.	"Coming Up (Soundcheck)" (McCartney)	4:25

== Personnel ==
- Paul McCartney – lead vocals, bass, guitar, mandolin, keyboards
- Rusty Anderson – guitar, vocals
- Abe Laboriel Jr. – drums, vocals
- Brian Ray – guitar, bass, vocals
- David Arch – keyboards
- Steve Orchard – 2019 remix sound engineer

== Nominations ==
Two tracks from Amoeba's Secret were nominated for Grammy Awards in 2008 for the 51st Grammy Awards on 8 February 2009: "That Was Me" for Best Male Pop Vocal Performance and "I Saw Her Standing There" for Best Solo Rock Vocal Performance. Neither song won, and both lost to John Mayer tracks ("Say" and "Gravity", respectively). McCartney performed "I Saw Her Standing There" with Dave Grohl on drums during the ceremony.

== Reception ==
Professional ratings
Review scores
Source	Rating
AllMusic	3/5 stars

Writing for AllMusic, Stephen Thomas Erlewine commented on Amoeba's Secret: "Sadly, this is just a taste of the full 20-song set, but it's a good one, containing two songs from Memory (the best being "That Was Me," sounding randy and funny in a way it wasn't on LP), a giddy run through "C Moon," and an energetic closer of "I Saw Her Standing There." It's a little of everything from Sir Paul, all of it good, all enough to make you wish you were there, or at least that the whole thing came out on CD."

== Charts ==
For Amoeba's Secret:

Chart (2009)	Peak position
US Billboard 200	119

For Amoeba Gig:

Chart (2019)	Peak position
Belgian Albums (Ultratop Flanders)	149
Belgian Albums (Ultratop Wallonia)	44
Dutch Albums (Album Top 100)	83
German Albums (Offizielle Top 100)	28
Japanese Albums (Oricon)	24
Scottish Albums (OCC)	19
Spanish Albums (PROMUSICAE)	51
UK Albums (OCC)	82

== Release details ==
Country	Date	Label	Format	Catalog number
United States	13 November 2007	Hear Music	12" EP	HMLP-30607 (8 88072 30607 3)
United States	27 January 2009	Hear Music	CD	HRM-31306-02 (8 88072 31306 4)
United States	27 January 2009	Hear Music	download	HRM-31306-25
