= Dena Tauriello =

American drummer

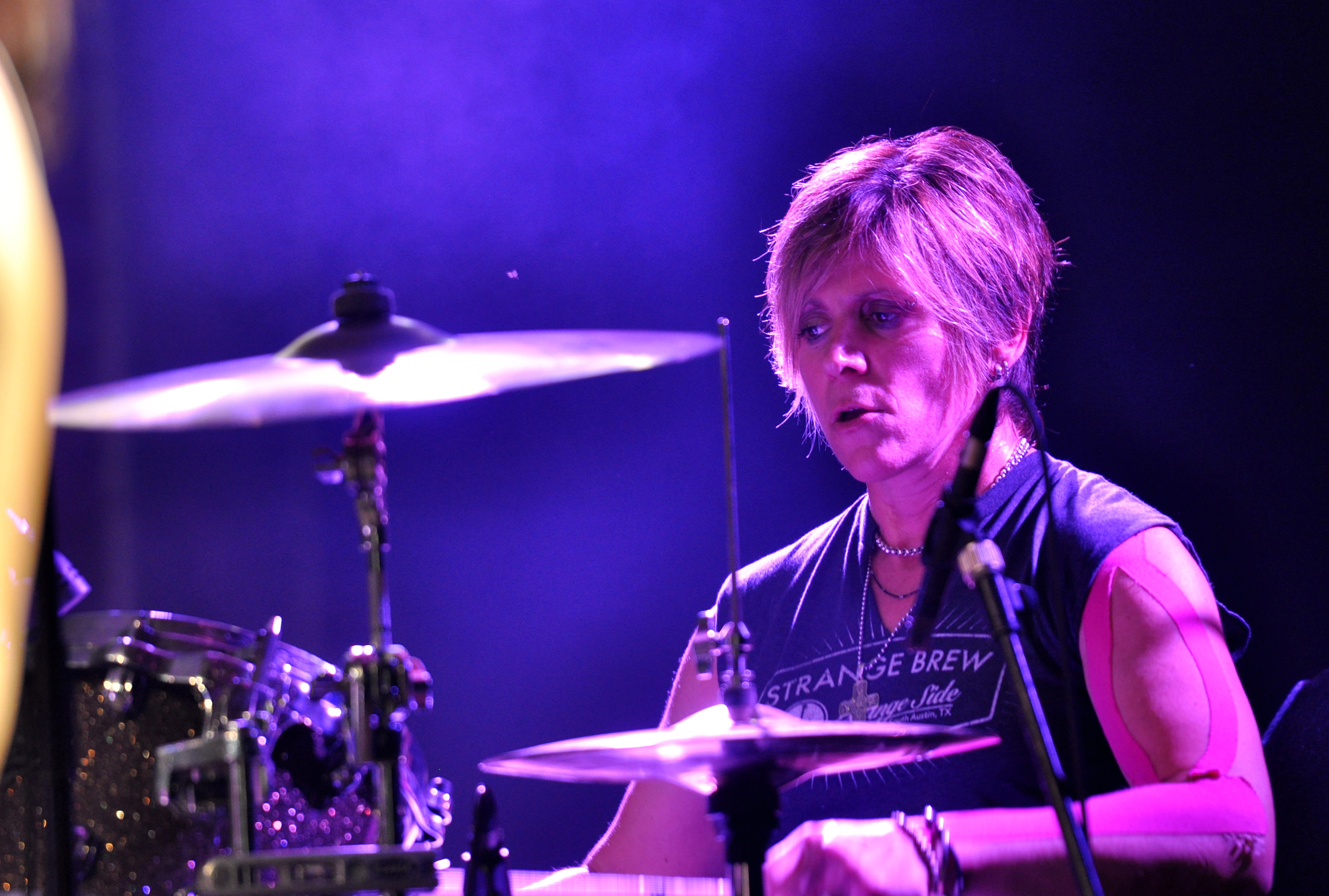
Dena Tauriello performing with Antigone Rising in 2016

Dena Tauriello is a New Jersey–based drummer, educator, and author.

== Early life ==
Tauriello grew up in Montville, New Jersey, and attended Montville Township High School, where she played softball and earned 11 varsity letters.

After seeing Karen Carpenter play the drums during a live performance, she was able to meet with her. This meeting inspired her to begin playing drums. She took drum lessons as a child, and continued taking private lessons for eight years.

Dena played drums in the all female cover band "Good Girl's Don't". GGD was a major attraction on the East Coast's cover band circuit drawing major crowds wherever they performed. They also opened for many signed artists like Korn and Fuel.

In 1998, Dena replaced Kristen Henderson (guitar, bass), who originally played drums in Antigone Rising, before taking up guitar. Dena was the only drummer to audition for the band at that time, having less than 24 hours to prepare. She joined the band a short time after her audition.

Dena was also one of the original members of New Jersey's pop/punk/rock band "From The Desk of Sally". While in FDOS, Dena recorded the band's first demo and recorded all drum tracks for the band's first official release "Everything and Nothing". Dena departed before its release in 1999.

She lists The Carpenters, The Beatles and The Pretenders as some of her musical influences.

== Antigone Rising ==
The band released four independent albums before they signed with a major label. Lava Records offered them a record deal in 2003, after Jasom Flom, the founder of Lava, saw one of their shows. Their major label debut From the Ground Up was released exclusively through Starbucks coffeeshops, in conjunction with Starbucks' Hear Music series.

The band was recently released from its contract with Atlantic Records. They are now signed to Starbucks record label. They are currently recording their upcoming album tentatively scheduled for release in the summer of 2007.

== Recognition ==
Dena is featured in the September 2018 issue of Modern Drummer magazine.
