= Memory Almost Full =

Studio album by Paul McCartney
- Released: 4 June 2007
- Recorded: October 2003, February 2004; March 2006 – February 2007
- Studios: Abbey Road, AIR and RAK, London; Henson Recording, Los Angeles; Hogg Hill Mill, Icklesham
- Genres: Rock; art pop
- Length: 42:00
- Label: Hear Music
- Producer: David Kahne

Paul McCartney chronology
Ecce Cor Meum (2006)	Memory Almost Full (2007)	Amoeba's Secret (2007)

Paul McCartney studio album chronology
Chaos and Creation in the Backyard (2005)	Memory Almost Full (2007)	Kisses on the Bottom (2012)

Singles from Memory Almost Full
- 1. "Ever Present Past" Released: 20 April 2007; 2. "Dance Tonight" Released: 18 June 2007; 3. "Nod Your Head" Released: 28 August 2007

Memory Almost Full is the fifteenth solo studio album by English musician Paul McCartney. It was released in the United Kingdom on 4 June 2007 and in the United States a day later. The album was the first release on Starbucks' Hear Music label. It was produced by David Kahne and recorded at Abbey Road Studios, Henson Recording Studios, AIR Studios, Hog Hill Mill Studios and RAK Studios between October 2003, and from 2006 to February 2007. In between the 2003 and 2006 sessions, McCartney was working on another studio album, Chaos and Creation in the Backyard (2005), with producer Nigel Godrich.

Memory Almost Full reached the Top 5 in both the UK and US, as well as Denmark, Sweden, Greece, and Norway. The Grammy-nominated album has sold over 2 million copies worldwide and has been certified gold by the RIAA for shipments of over 500,000 copies just in the United States. The album was released in three versions: a single disc, a 2-CD set, and a CD/DVD deluxe edition, the latter of which was released on 6 November 2007.

== Background ==
Nine demos were recorded at Hog Hill Mill studio in September 2003 by Paul McCartney and his touring band. A month later, in October, album sessions for Memory Almost Full began, and were produced by David Kahne and recorded at Abbey Road Studios. McCartney and the band recorded the songs "You Tell Me", "Only Mama Knows", "Vintage Clothes", "That Was Me", "Feet in the Clouds", "House of Wax", "The End of the End", and "Whole Life". (Note: The latter of which, originally recorded in 1995, was released as its own CD, separate from the Memory Almost Full album.) However, the sessions were cut short and put on hiatus when McCartney started another album, Chaos and Creation in the Backyard, with producer Nigel Godrich.

In the website constructed for the album, McCartney stated: "I actually started this album, Memory Almost Full, before my last album Chaos and Creation in the Backyard, released September 2005. (...) When I was just finishing up everything concerned with Chaos and had just got the Grammy nominations (2006) I realised I had this album to go back to and finish off. So I got it out to listen to it again, wondering if I would enjoy it, but actually I really loved it. All I did at first was just listen to a couple of things and then I began to think, 'OK, I like that track – now, what is wrong with it?' And it might be something like a drum sound, so then I would re-drum and see where we would get to. (...) In places it's a very personal record and a lot of it is retrospective, drawing from memory, like memories from being a kid, from Liverpool and from summers gone. The album is evocative, emotional, rocking, but I can't really sum it up in one sentence".

== Recording ==
Many songs from Memory Almost Full were from a group of songs, which also included songs from Chaos and Creation in the Backyard, and some intended for the former nearly ended up on the latter. Any songs that were started, but not finished, for Chaos and Creation in the Backyard, McCartney didn't want to re-do for Memory Almost Full. As sessions for the album progressed McCartney wrote some more songs, something that McCartney used to do when he was in the Beatles. An early version of "Ever Present Past" was recorded at either one of the three following studios: RAK Studios, AIR Studios or Ocean Way Studios; sometime between November 2003 and April 2005. Two years after the 2003 session, sessions for the album started again. The book Paul McCartney: Recording Sessions (1969–2013). A Journey Through Paul McCartney's Songs After the Beatles reports that the recordings of the album were started in September–October 2003 and resumed in February 2004 at Abbey Road, with other sessions taking place between March 2006 and February 2007.

New tracks were recorded at the following studios: McCartney's home studio in Sussex, Hog Hill Mill, Los Angeles' Henson Studios, London's RAK Studios and AIR Studios, and New York's SeeSquared Studios. The songs recorded at those studios were "Nod Your Head", "In Private", "222", "Gratitude", "Mr Bellamy", "See Your Sunshine", and "Ever Present Past". Of those songs, "Mr Bellamy", "Ever Present Past", "Gratitude", "Nod Your Head", and "In Private" were all recorded on the same day, in March 2006. As well as working on songs from the first Memory Almost Full album session in 2003, "Why So Blue" was re-recorded. In total, between 20 and 25 songs were recorded for the album. "Dance Tonight" was recorded, along with "Feet in the Clouds" and "222" being reworked, between January and February 2007 at RAK Studios, as the last song recorded for the album. The album was mixed by Kahne and Andy Wallace.

== Songs ==
In an interview with Billboard magazine in May 2007, McCartney said that the album's material was "in some ways a little bit retrospective. Some of them are of now, some of them hark back to the past, but all of them are songs I'm very proud of." McCartney played mandolin on the song "Dance Tonight". He comments that "In searching the instrument to try and find chords, which I did with the guitar when I was 14, probably, that freshness was brought back." "Ever Present Past", which McCartney called "personal", originally started out as a song called "Perfect Lover". This early version was more folk-like, similar to Chaos and Creation in the Backyard's "Friends to Go". "Perfect Lover" went through a minor lyrical change, the bridge was changed, and an overhaul of its musical arrangement, before it finally became "Ever Present Past". The track also includes references to the Beatles. In June 2007, McCartney revealed that "See Your Sunshine" "is pretty much an out-and-out love song for Heather. A lot of the album was done before, during and after our separation. I didn't go back and take out any songs to do with her." "You Tell Me" is about McCartney's memories of his previous wife, Linda.

"Mr Bellamy", the sixth song on the album, was thought by online fans to be about McCartney's then-recent divorce. McCartney invited Radiohead frontman Thom Yorke to play piano on the song, but he declined. The press ran articles claiming that Yorke had "snubbed" McCartney, but Yorke later revealed that he "really liked the song" but felt he would be unable to perform to the required standard. "Gratitude" is reportedly about the divorce between Heather Mills and McCartney.

The album features a five song-medley (starting off with "Vintage Clothes" and ending with "The End of the End"), which in an interview with Billboard magazine, McCartney said that it was previously "something I wanted to revisit" as "nobody had been doing that for a while." The medley was a set of intentionally written material, whereas the medley that McCartney had worked on for the Beatles' Abbey Road was actually made up of "bits we had knocking around." The medley starts off with "Vintage Clothes", which McCartney "sat down one day" to write, that was "looking back, [and] looking back.", about life. It was followed by the bass-led "That Was Me", which is about his "school days and teachers", the medley, as McCartney stated, then "progressed from there." The next songs are "Feet in the Clouds", about the inactivity while one is growing up, and "House of Wax", about the life of being a celebrity. The final song in medley, "The End of the End", was written at McCartney's Cavendish Avenue home while playing on his father, Jim's, piano.

== Packaging ==
Some people mentioned that the album's title, Memory Almost Full, is an anagram of "for my soulmate LLM" (the initials of Linda Louise McCartney). When asked if this was intentional, McCartney replied; "Some things are best left a mystery". In an interview with Pitchfork Media, McCartney clarified, "I must say, someone told me [there is an anagram], and I think it's a complete mystery, because it's so complete. There does appear to be an anagram in the title. And it's a mystery. It was not intentional." The album's title was actually inspired by a message that came up on his mobile phone. He thought the phrase summed up modern life.

A significant proportion of the CD release of Memory Almost Full incorporated a cover insert whose top-right corner was intentionally folded down to the center of the insert, leaving the CD tray visible. The folded-down white corner covers up the corner of the armchair image, but has the artist and album names printed so that the text is complete despite the fold. Upon opening and flattening out the cover insert, the armchair is complete, but the portion of the text which is printed on the folded-down corner is not printed on the front of the cover, leaving the text incomplete. This was the first time such an artistic intervention occurred within a standard jewel-case, and at first glance had the possibility of being viewed as a mis-manufactured copy. McCartney on the CD case/album artwork stated, "I really wanted to make the CD a desirable object. Something that I know I'd want to pick up from the shelf, something that would make people curious."

The chair on the cover is the etching Black Love Chair by Humphrey Ocean printed by Maurice Payne and chosen by Paul McCartney after a visit to Miankoma Studio, Amagansett, Long Island.

== Release and promotion ==
The album was his first for Starbucks' Hear Music record label, after previously having a 45-year-old relationship with Capitol/EMI. The recording contract with Capitol/EMI ended a few months prior to the release of the album, after McCartney had found out that EMI were planning to take six months to set up a promotional plan for the album. McCartney was the first artist to sign to Hear Music. The Rock Radio website leaked a track listing for the album on 12 April 2007. A day later, producer David Kahne stated on the same site that the leaked listing was bogus. The first US single, "Ever Present Past", made its radio debut on 20 April. A music video for "Dance Tonight" premiered on 23 May via YouTube. The album was released on 4 June 2007 in the UK, (Note: Standard edition: Europe Hear Music 723 0348; Special CD casing: Europe Hear Music 723 0357) and a day later on the 5th in the US, (Note: US Hear Music HMCD-30348) and with a vinyl edition later in the month on 25 June. (Note: Europe Hear Music 723 0383)

It was also McCartney's first album to be available as a digital download. The lead single for the rest of the world is "Dance Tonight", released on McCartney's 65th birthday in the UK, 18 June as a digital download, with a physical release a month later, on 23 July of a CD single and a 10" shaped picture disc. The music video features Natalie Portman and Mackenzie Crook, and was directed by Michel Gondry. The third single, "Nod Your Head", was released as a digital download single on 28 August via the iTunes Store. "Ever Present Past" was released as a single in the UK, on 5 November, as a CD single and 7" single.

Promotion for the album came in several forms, such as a worldwide listening party at over 10,000 Starbucks stores on the day of the album's US release, with an approximation of 6 million people hearing the album. At ten of the Starbucks stores, fans contributed in a video tribute, that aired on the internet on 18 June 2007. Other promotions included a limited edition Paul McCartney Starbucks card, similar to what they had done for Ray Charles's Genius Loves Company, the Starbucks-owned satellite radio station XM Channel made a program about McCartney and the album, released one song prior to the album on iTunes, performed at iTunes Festival: London, and playing free shows. On 6 November 2007, the album was re-released as Memory Almost Full – Deluxe Edition. The set included one CD and one DVD. The CD included the standard album plus the three extra songs from the 2-CD edition. The DVD contained five tracks recorded live at The Electric Ballroom in London, and two music videos.

== Reception ==
Professional ratings
Aggregate scores
Source	Rating
Metacritic	69/100
Review scores
Source	Rating
AllMusic	4/5 stars
The A.V. Club	B+
Entertainment Weekly	A−
The Guardian	2/5 stars
Los Angeles Times	2.5/4 stars
musicOMH	4/5 stars
The Observer	5/5 stars
Pitchfork	6.4/10
PopMatters	5/10
Rolling Stone	3/5 stars

Memory Almost Full received positive reaction. At Metacritic, the album earned an average score of 69 based on 23 reviews from critics, which indicates "generally favorable reviews". Neil Spencer of The Observer remarked that a substantial portion of Memory Almost Full was reminiscent of McCartney's solo band Wings at their best, particularly their album Band on the Run; Spencer found it to be "a way more focused album [from McCartney] than usual." Entertainment Weekly's Chris Willman noted the album's nostalgic lyrical themes "drifting toward weightier thoughts on mortality and the passing of time," likening the album to a more pop-friendly version of Bob Dylan's Time Out of Mind (1997) and hailing it McCartney's best work since Flowers in the Dirt (1989). Evan Serpick of Rolling Stone magazine compared the medley of five songs in the second part of the album to the medley in the Beatles' Abbey Road. The A.V. Club's Steven Hyden did likewise, praising McCartney's signature "insanely catchy fragments" throughout the album and dubbing the project "an eccentric triumph".

musicOMH staffer Jenni Cole saw Memory Almost Full as an effort flush with "perfect pop songs" which were influenced by various musical themes and motifs throughout McCartney’s career, pondering if the title and nostalgia in the music could qualify as a retrospective on his career. She observed that "See Your Sunshine" and "Vintage Clothes" sounded as if they could have been songs for Wings, while "Ever Present Past" harkened back to McCartney's work in the early 1980s. AllMusic reviewer Stephen Thomas Erlewine wrote that despite McCartney having "mortality on the mind," the album "is startlingly bright and frequently lively", starkly contrasting the downcast nature of Chaos and Creation in the Backyard.

Pitchfork gave the record a mixed response, with Stuart Berman criticising the album's marketing strategy with Starbucks and dismissing the opening track "Dance Tonight" as stereotypically "too safe, too typical, too square". However, he ultimately conceded that it was "a lot more idiosyncratic than its coffee-chain marketing plan suggests," praising the album's second half especially. Jude Rogers of The Guardian expected a "sorrowful, sombre, post-divorce album," but was surprised to find that "Gratitude" seemed to be the only one with much reference to the subject. On the other hand, Rogers lamented that "his frequent, chirpy nods to his past [...] sound lumpishly heavy." In his review for The Los Angeles Times, Randy Lewis found the album to be occasionally over-indulgent in nostalgia, opining that "his sugary romanticism often goes unchecked in this virtual one-man show."

This album was ranked number 22 on Rolling Stone's list of the Top 50 Albums of 2007.

== Commercial performance ==
In the US, Memory Almost Full debuted at number 3 on the Billboard 200 with about 161,000 copies sold within the first week, making it McCartney's highest-charting album there since 1997's Flaming Pie. 47% of the album sales from the opening week were from Starbucks coffee shops, which were the best sales for any album in the history of Starbucks. While it was announced that copies of the album sold in the Starbucks coffee shops in the UK would not be counted by the Official UK Charts, because they are not registered in the copies counting system, Memory Almost Full, however, still managed to hit number 5 on the UK Album Charts. The album also peaked at number 1 on Billboard Internet Sales Chart, and number 3 on Billboard Top Internet Albums Downloads.

It was ranked at number 90 on the top-100 of the Billboard Year-end chart, and number 177 on the UK year-end chart. The album won awards for the Best PR Campaign award at the Music Week Awards ceremony, and the Online/Digital Campaign award by New Media Age. The album reportedly sold 105,000 copies in his homeland before the standard version of the CD in a unique slip-case was given away free as part of a promotion with British newspaper The Mail on Sunday (18 May 2008).

"Ever Present Past" peaked at number 10 on the Billboard Bubbling Under Hot 100, and charted at number 16 on the Adult Contemporary chart. "Dance Tonight" peaked at number 46 on Hot Digital Songs, number 58 on the Pop 100, and finally at number 69 on the Billboard Hot 100.

== Track listing ==
All songs written by Paul McCartney.

No.	Title	Length
1.	"Dance Tonight"	2:54
2.	"Ever Present Past"	2:57
3.	"See Your Sunshine"	3:20
4.	"Only Mama Knows"	4:17
5.	"You Tell Me"	3:15
6.	"Mr. Bellamy"	3:39
7.	"Gratitude"	3:19
8.	"Vintage Clothes"	2:22
9.	"That Was Me"	2:38
10.	"Feet in the Clouds"	3:24
11.	"House of Wax"	4:59
12.	"The End of the End"	2:57
13.	"Nod Your Head"	1:58
Total length:		41:59

Japanese bonus track
No.	Title	Length
14.	"Why So Blue"	3:11
Total length:		45:10

iTunes bonus track
No.	Title	Length
14.	"Dance Tonight (Acoustic version)" (iTunes Store pre-order bonus)	2:47
Total length:		44:46

Deluxe edition bonus tracks
No.	Title	Length
14.	"In Private"	2:08
15.	"Why So Blue"	3:11
16.	"222"	3:38
Total length:		50:56

2CD limited edition bonus disc
No.	Title	Length
1.	"In Private"	2:08
2.	"Why So Blue"	3:11
3.	"222"	3:38
4.	"Paul talks about the music of Memory Almost Full"	26:04
Total length:		35:01

Deluxe edition bonus DVD: Live at the Electric Ballroom, London, 7th June 2007
No.	Title	Writer(s)	Length
1.	"Drive My Car"	Lennon–McCartney
2.	"Dance Tonight"
3.	"House of Wax"
4.	"Nod Your Head"
5.	"Only Mama Knows"
6.	"Dance Tonight" (music video)
7.	"Ever Present Past" (music video)

== Personnel ==
Personnel per booklet.

Musicians

Paul McCartney – all instruments except for "Only Mama Knows", "You Tell Me", "Vintage Clothes", "That Was Me", "Feet in the Clouds", and "House of Wax", where he was joined by the following musicians (all from his touring band):

- Paul Wickens – keyboards
- Rusty Anderson – guitar
- Brian Ray – bass
- Abe Laboriel Jr. – drums

Production

- David Kahne – producer and programming
- Adam Noble, David Kahne, Steve Orchard, Geoff Emerick, Paul Hicks – engineers
- Jamie Kirkham, Eddie Klein, Adam Noble, Chris Bolster, Kevin Mills, Mirek Stiles – assistant engineers
- David Kahne, Andy Wallace – mixing
- Bob Ludwig – mastering
- Humphrey Ocean – cover art front: black love chair (aquatint) and cover art back: black love chair (gouache)
- Max Vadukul – inlay photography
- Rebecca and Mike – ideas

== Grammy nominations ==
Memory Almost Full has been nominated in the following categories:

- Best Pop Vocal Album for Memory Almost Full (2008)
- Best Male Pop Vocal Performance for "Dance Tonight" (2008)
- Best Solo Rock Vocal Performance for "Only Mama Knows" (2008)
- Best Male Pop Vocal Performance for "That Was Me" (2009)

== Charts ==
=== Weekly charts ===
Chart (2007)	Peak position
Australian Albums (ARIA)	33
Austrian Albums (Ö3 Austria)	17
Belgian Albums (Ultratop Flanders)	25
Belgian Albums (Ultratop Wallonia)	25
Canadian Albums (Billboard)	6
Danish Albums (Hitlisten)	2
Dutch Albums (Album Top 100)	6
European Albums Chart	3
Finnish Albums (Suomen virallinen lista)	33
French Albums (SNEP)	13
German Albums (Offizielle Top 100)	18
Greek Albums (IFPI)	4
Hungarian Albums (MAHASZ)	28
Irish Albums (IRMA)	30
Italian Albums (FIMI)	8
Japanese Albums (Oricon)	17
Mexican Albums (AMPROFON)	17
Norwegian Albums (VG-lista)	4
Scottish Albums (Official Charts)	6
Spanish Albums (Promusicae)	17
Swedish Albums (Sverigetopplistan)	3
Swiss Albums (Schweizer Hitparade)	20
UK Albums (Official Charts)	5
US Billboard 200	3
US Top Rock Albums (Billboard)	1

=== Year-end charts ===
Chart (2007)	Position
French Albums (SNEP)	200
Italian Albums (FIMI)	179
UK Albums (OCC)	177
US Billboard 200	90
US Top Rock Albums (Billboard)	17

=== Certifications and sales ===
Region	Certification	Certified units/sales
Canada (Music Canada)	Gold	50,000^{^}
Denmark (IFPI Danmark)	Gold	15,000
Japan (Oricon)	—	43,563
Russia (NFPF)	Platinum	20,000^{*}
United Kingdom (BPI)	Gold	105,010
United States (RIAA)	Gold	634,000
^{*} Sales figures based on certification alone.^{^} Shipments figures based on certification alone.

Notes:

- On the article that Concord Music Group posted on their official site in February 2007 (a month before Memory Almost Full was certified gold by the Recording Industry Association of America), Hear Music announced that shipments of the album reached a platinum status in the US. The label also claimed that the album gained a gold in other countries like Norway, though International Federation of the Phonographic Industry has not certified the album at any label there as of 2014.

== 2007 mini-tour releases ==
In the summer and autumn of 2007, Paul embarked on a promotional mini-tour playing concerts to small audiences - including The Olympia, in Paris, when he performed with The Beatles in 1964 - all in support of his album Memory Almost Full. Four of the performances were later released in various formats.

=== The Electric Ballroom ===
Five songs from this 7 June 2007 show at the Electric Ballroom in London were released as video tracks on the Memory Almost Full deluxe edition bonus DVD (see Track Listing above).

=== Amoeba Gig ===
On 27 June 2007, Paul and his band played unannounced at Amoeba Music in Hollywood, California. The performance was released as follows:

- in 2007, a 4-track EP called Amoeba's Secret
- also in 2007, 4 tracks were released on B-sides of different versions of the single "Ever Present Past" (see table below)
- in 2010, a 12-track UK/Ireland promotional CD called Live in Los Angeles
- in 2012, a 14-track digital release on his website to premium members, called Live in Los Angeles – The Extended Set
- in 2019, the full 21-song performance was finally released as Amoeba Gig

Amoeba performance track listings

Secret	EPP	L.A.	Ext.	Gig	Song	Length
		1	1	1	"Drive My Car"	2:41
1	UK CD	2	2	2	"Only Mama Knows"	3:47
	UK CD	3	3	3	"Dance Tonight"	3:25
2		4	4	4	"C Moon"	3:13
				5	"The Long and Winding Road"	3:34
				6	"I'll Follow the Sun"	2:56
				7	"Calico Skies"	2:57
3	iTunes	5	5	8	"That Was Me"	3:03
		6	6	9	"Blackbird"	3:44
		7	7	10	"Here Today"	3:13
		8	8	11	"Back in the U.S.S.R."	4:08
			9	12	"Nod Your Head"	2:00
	UK 7"		10	13	"House of Wax"	6:02
				14	"I've Got a Feeling"	5:56
				15	"Matchbox"	3:31
		9	11	16	"Get Back"	4:21
				17	"Baby Face"	0:54
		10	12	18	"Hey Jude"	8:01
				19	"Let It Be"	3:54
		11	13	20	"Lady Madonna"	3:34
4		12	14	21	"I Saw Her Standing There"	3:25

=== iTunes Festival: London ===
On 5 July 2007, Paul and his band played for 350 fans in the Institute of Contemporary Arts (ICA) on The Mall in London as part of the first ever iTunes Festival. On 21 August 2007, a 6-track digital EP iTunes Festival: London became available only on iTunes. All tracks written by Paul McCartney except where noted.

No.	Title	Writer(s)	Length
1.	"Coming Up"		3:39
2.	"Only Mama Knows"		3:38
3.	"That Was Me"		2:48
4.	"Jet"	Paul & Linda McCartney	4:13
5.	"Nod Your Head"		1:58
6.	"House of Wax"		4:55
Total length:			19:23

=== BBC Electric Proms ===
On 25 October 2007 Paul and his band played the Roundhouse in London as part of the BBC Electric Proms 2007. The band was joined by a string section for "Only Mama Knows", "Calico Skies" and "Eleanor Rigby". More than seven years later, on 3 December 2014, 17 of the 24 songs from the concert were released on iTunes, but soon after removed inexplicably in February 2015.

No.	Title	Writer(s)	Length
1.	"Magical Mystery Tour"	Lennon–McCartney	2:36
2.	"Flaming Pie"	Paul McCartney	2:25
3.	"Got to Get You into My Life"	Lennon–McCartney	2:46
4.	"Dance Tonight"	Paul McCartney	2:52
5.	"Only Mama Knows"	Paul McCartney	3:53
6.	"Blackbird"	Lennon–McCartney	2:28
7.	"Calico Skies"	Paul McCartney	2:28
8.	"Eleanor Rigby"	Lennon–McCartney	2:15
9.	"Band on the Run"	Paul & Linda McCartney	5:10
10.	"Back in the U.S.S.R."	Lennon–McCartney	3:03
11.	"Live and Let Die"	Paul & Linda McCartney	3:06
12.	"Baby Face"	Harry Akst, Benny Davis	0:49
13.	"Hey Jude"	Lennon–McCartney	6:32
14.	"Let It Be"	Lennon–McCartney	3:43
15.	"Lady Madonna"	Lennon–McCartney	2:23
16.	"I Saw Her Standing There"	Lennon–McCartney	3:01
17.	"Get Back"	Lennon–McCartney	3:36
Total length:			60:53

The seven songs not released from this performance are "C Moon", "The Long and Winding Road", "I'll Follow the Sun", "That Was Me", "Here Today", "House of Wax" and "I've Got a Feeling".
