= Ever Present Past =

Single by Paul McCartney

from the album Memory Almost Full
- B-side: "House of Wax (live at Amoeba Music)" (7"); "Only Mama Knows (live at Amoeba Music)" (CD)
- Released: 15 May 2007 (US); 5 November 2007 (UK)
- Recorded: March 2006
- Studio: Hog Hill Mill (Icklesham, UK)
- Genre: Rock
- Length: 2:59
- Label: MPL; Hear Music
- Songwriter: Paul McCartney
- Producer: David Kahne

Paul McCartney singles chronology
"This Never Happened Before" (2006)	"Ever Present Past" (2007)	"Dance Tonight" (2007)

Memory Almost Full track listing
- 13 tracks: 1. "Dance Tonight"; 2. "Ever Present Past"; 3. "See Your Sunshine"; 4. "Only Mama Knows"; 5. "You Tell Me"; 6. "Mr. Bellamy"; 7. "Gratitude"; 8. "Vintage Clothes"; 9. "That Was Me"; 10. "Feet in the Clouds"; 11. "House of Wax"; 12. "End of the End"; 13. "Nod Your Head"

Music video
- "Ever Present Past" on YouTube

"Ever Present Past" is a song by Paul McCartney and is the second track on his 2007 album Memory Almost Full. The song was also released as the first single from that album in the United States on 15 May 2007. The video for the song was premiered on 1 October 2007. McCartney played all the instruments on the song.

The song was released as the second British single from Memory Almost Full on 5 November 2007 and debuted a week later at #85 in the UK Singles Chart. The single package included a unique "cut out and make your own mobius strip" insert.

== Music video ==
The video was directed by British director Phil Griffin. McCartney enters an elegant hall, where a group of black-dressed and very similar female dancers walk around. He meets his doppelgänger, who starts dancing with the others while singing the song. The two McCartneys meet up two more times. At the end, McCartney is left alone in the middle of the room, bends on his knee and fades away slowly. This and the presence of the doppelgänger have been interpreted as contemporary references to the Paul is dead urban legend.

== Personnel ==
Personnel per Andrew Grant Jackson

- Paul McCartney – electric guitar w/ tone pedal Vox AC30, bass, harpsichord, flugelhorn, acoustic guitar, clavioline

== Track listing ==
UK 7" (723 0621)

1. "Ever Present Past" – 2:59
2. "House of Wax" (live) – 5:18
  - Recorded at Amoeba Music Los Angeles, 27 June 2007

UK CD (723 0620)

1. "Ever Present Past" – 2:59
2. "Only Mama Knows" (live) – 3:49
  - Recorded at Amoeba Music Los Angeles, 27 June 2007
3. "Dance Tonight" (live) – 3:15
  - Recorded at Amoeba Music Los Angeles, 27 June 2007

iTunes download

1. "Ever Present Past" – 2:57
2. "Only Mama Knows" (live) – 3:45
  - Recorded at Amoeba Music Los Angeles, 27 June 2007
3. "That Was Me" (live) – 3:05
  - Recorded at Amoeba Music Los Angeles, 27 June 2007

== Chart performance ==
"Ever Present Past" debuted the week ending 6 June 2007 on Billboard's Bubbling Under Hot 100 chart at number 10 and the Pop 100 chart at number 93. A week later as Memory Almost Full debuted at number 3 in the Billboard 200, the song debuted at number 27 on Billboard's Adult Contemporary chart, mirroring the placement of McCartney's 2006 single "This Never Happened Before", ultimately reaching number 16 on that chart. The song also reached number 42 in Japan, number 1 in Russia, number 29 in Scotland, number 48 on the Canadian Adult Contemporary chart, number 16 on the US Adult Alternative Songs chart and number 25 on the UK Physical Singles Chart.
