= Mr. Bellamy (song) =

Song by Paul McCartney

from the album Memory Almost Full
- Released: 4 June 2007
- Genre: Operatic pop
- Length: 3:39
- Label: Hear Music
- Songwriter: Paul McCartney
- Producer: David Kahne

Memory Almost Full track listing
- 13 tracks: 1. "Dance Tonight"; 2. "Ever Present Past"; 3. "See Your Sunshine"; 4. "Only Mama Knows"; 5. "You Tell Me"; 6. "Mr. Bellamy"; 7. "Gratitude"; 8. "Vintage Clothes"; 9. "That Was Me"; 10. "Feet in the Clouds"; 11. "House of Wax"; 12. "End of the End"; 13. "Nod Your Head"

"Mr. Bellamy" is a song by the English musician Paul McCartney from his 2007 album Memory Almost Full.

== Background ==
McCartney tried to get Radiohead frontman Thom Yorke to play on the song. Yorke later revealed why he didn't play on the song, stating "Uhh, 'cause I can't play the piano," he added. "Not like that. I had to explain to him that, I listened to the tune – 'Mr Bellamy' – and I really liked the song, but the piano playing involved two hands doing things separately. 'I don't have that skill available.' I said to him, 'I strum piano, that's it." McCartney later mentioned his daughter wanted him to collab with Yorke, saying "[My daughter] keeps saying to me, 'Ring Thom and just go into the studio and just see what you come out with." According to author Paul Du Noyer in his book Conversations with McCartney, it is a "tale of a would-be suicide".

== Reception ==
BBC Music critic Daryl Easlea stated in a review of the album that Paul McCartney managed to sound like the English rock band 10cc on the song. Pitchfork critic Stuart Berman states that it "rates as a worthy addition to his canon of stodgy-English-folk character studies, colored by baroque flourishes, baritone backing vocals and a coda reminiscent of the eerie, dying moments of 'Magical Mystery Tour'".

== Anagram of "Mills Betray Me" incident ==
On a Paul McCartney forum, contributors to the forum urged McCartney to release the song as a single, as they believed the name to be an anagram aimed towards his former wife Heather Mills that read "Mills Betray Me". McCartney posted on his website about the Memory Almost Full album, stating: "Who is Mr Bellamy? Well, I never know who these people are. Who is Chuck and Dave from 'When I'm 64'? Who is Eleanor Rigby? Who is Desmond and Molly from 'Ob-La-Di Ob-La-Da'? I don't know, I just make them up." "Mr. Bellamy" is also an anagram for almost 18,000 other words in the English language.

== Personnel ==
According to the booklet:

- Paul McCartney – all instruments and vocals
