= Dance Tonight =

2007 single by Paul McCartney

Single by Paul McCartney

from the album Memory Almost Full
- B-side: "Nod Your Head" (Sly David Short mix) (International CD)
- Released: 5 June 2007
- Recorded: January–February 2007
- Studio: RAK (London, UK)
- Length: 2:54
- Label: MPL Communications, Hear Music
- Songwriter: Paul McCartney
- Producer: David Kahne

Paul McCartney singles chronology
"Ever Present Past" (2007)	"Dance Tonight" (2007)	"Nod Your Head" (2007)

Music video
- "Dance Tonight" on YouTube

Memory Almost Full track listing
- 13 tracks: 1. "Dance Tonight"; 2. "Ever Present Past"; 3. "See Your Sunshine"; 4. "Only Mama Knows"; 5. "You Tell Me"; 6. "Mr. Bellamy"; 7. "Gratitude"; 8. "Vintage Clothes"; 9. "That Was Me"; 10. "Feet in the Clouds"; 11. "House of Wax"; 12. "End of the End"; 13. "Nod Your Head"

"Dance Tonight" is a song by Paul McCartney, the opening track to his 2007 album Memory Almost Full. The song was released as a download single in the United Kingdom on 18 June 2007, McCartney's 65th birthday. A week later, the song debuted at number 34 in the UK Singles Chart. The UK single was also issued as a picture disc that came in a plastic sleeve with a cardboard insert. On 1 July, the song peaked at number 26 on the UK Singles Chart. In the United States, it was released as the second single from the album, debuting and peaking at number 69 on the Billboard Hot 100. It marked McCartney's final appearance in the Hot 100 until 2015. The song was also nominated for Best Male Pop Vocal Performance at the 2008 Grammy Awards.

McCartney performed the song live as a duet with Australian singer Kylie Minogue on Jools Holland's 2007 New Year's Eve television special Hootenanny. In 2020, it was covered by American country music star Jeannie Seely as a duet with Ray Stevens for her album An American Classic.

== Origin ==
The left-handed mandolin used for the song, shown delivered to him by mail in the music video, was purchased by McCartney from a guitar shop he frequents in London. Whenever he would play the mandolin, his three-year-old daughter Beatrice would be moved to dance, after which McCartney states that the song "wrote itself". It was the last song recorded for the album, and it was included on the album at the last minute.

The song is also included in an iPod + iTunes advertisement featuring a black and white McCartney walking down a colourful, animated street while performing the song. It saw frequent airplay in summer 2007.

== Recording ==
"Dance Tonight" was recorded in January–February 2007 at RAK Studios in London, with McCartney playing mandolin, electric guitar, bass, drums, keyboards, percussion and güiro.

== Music video ==
A music video for the song was directed by Michel Gondry, features Natalie Portman and Mackenzie Crook, and is choreographed by Blanca Li using the technique Pepper's ghost to interject both Paul's home and the ghosts making them appear in the house. It begins with a Royal Mail postman (Crook) delivering a package to McCartney's Home. The postman invites himself in for a cup of tea; thinking it was a cricket bat that McCartney ordered however it turned out that inside the package was a left-handed mandolin. McCartney then decided to play a chord on the mandolin trying it out. As soon as McCartney starts playing the song, a mandolin themed ghost (Portman) emerges from the package and starts dancing. More extravagantly dressed ghosts emerge from other places (an open drawer, the fireplace, the washing machine etc.) and dance around McCartney while he plays and sings in various rooms. The ghosts also play tricks on the postman, floating around him and making him levitate, which scares him away from the house. During the song's second-to-last verse, Portman steals McCartney's mandolin, which reverses the situation, making her come alive while turning McCartney into a ghost. He chases her and the other ghosts until she slips back into the package, dragging McCartney in with her as well, with some of the ghosts mistakenly swapping places (Twigs in the cutlery drawer, the fireplace ghost in the washing machine, etc.) as they returned to their world. As the song ends, the ghosts' world (inside the package) is revealed to be a wild party, where all the ghosts, now fully alive, have fun (the postman is there as well), while McCartney plays bass, accompanied by a drummer (Gondry). The final shot of the video is of the postman's van, left empty on the side of the road with the door left open as if spirited away.

The video was posted exclusively on YouTube on 22 May 2007. It is now available on the DVD compilation Michel Gondry 2: More Videos (Before and After DVD 1) and on the Deluxe CD/DVD Edition of McCartney's album Memory Almost Full.

== Track listings ==
Originally the single was to be released simultaneously via download, 7" and CD, but the release was scaled back to just a download on 18 June 2007. According to the official album website, a picture disc 7" was released in the UK on 23 July 2007, while the CD was released internationally on a date to be announced. The song still managed to chart in the United States, despite not being released in any form there, except an acoustic version available on iTunes from the Summer of Love 1967 double issue of Rolling Stone magazine.

7"

1. "Dance Tonight"

International CD

1. "Dance Tonight"
2. "Nod Your Head" (Sly David Short mix)
  - This mix of album track "Nod Your Head" features additional production by Sly Dunbar and vocals by Lady Saw, Sizzla and Cherine.

== Personnel ==
- Paul McCartney – Vocals, mandolin, drums, percussion, lead guitar, bass guitar, keyboard, güiro

== Charts ==
Chart (2007)	Peak position
Czech Republic Airplay (ČNS IFPI)	98
UK Singles (OCC)	26
UK Downloads (Official Charts Company)	15
US Billboard Hot 100	69
US Adult Alternative Airplay (Billboard)	19
US Billboard Pop 100	58

== In popular culture ==
The song was used in the advertising on PBS network Thirteen for its May 2013 lineup.
