= Consider Me Gone (disambiguation) =

"Consider Me Gone" is a 2009 song by Reba McEntire.

Consider Me Gone may also refer to:

- "Consider Me Gone", the final episode (24 March 1990) of the TV series ALF
- "Consider Me Gone", a 2007 single by Hilary McRae, subsequently appearing on her first album
- "Consider Me Gone", a song by Sting on his 1985 debut solo album The Dream of the Blue Turtles
