= From the Ground Up (Antigone Rising album) =

Studio album by Antigone Rising
- Released: May 11, 2005
- Genres: Pop rock, folk rock
- Length: 59:30
- Label: Hear Music/Lava Records

Antigone Rising chronology
From the Ground Up (2005)	23 Red (2011)

Professional ratings
Review scores
Source	Rating
AllMusic	3.5/5 stars
Entertainment Weekly	
Michigan Daily	(unfavorable)
Robert Christgau	(choice cut)
Sacramento News & Review	(mixed)

From the Ground Up is the major-label debut album by all-female rock band Antigone Rising. It was released on the Starbucks-owned label Hear Music on May 11, 2005 as part of a promotional deal with Starbucks, where the album was sold exclusively until September 13, 2005. It was the first album to be released as part of the "Hear Music Debut" series, which highlights new and emerging artists.

== Recording ==
From the Ground Up was recorded live in front of a small audience of fans.

== Commercial performance ==
From the Ground Up had sold 31,000 copies at Starbucks alone, as of June 6, 2005. It debuted at No. 93 on the Billboard Comprehensive Albums Chart.

== Track listing ==
All songs written by Kristen Henderson, except where noted.

1. "Hello" 3:17
2. "Waiting, Watching, Wishing" (Chris Trapper) 4:43
3. "She's Not Innocent" 3:31
4. "Open Hearts & Doors" 4:32
5. "Michael" 4:13
6. "What?" 4:14
7. "Happy Home" 3:21
8. "Longshot" 4:15
9. "Don't Look Back" 4:27
10. "Better" 4:25
11. "She Lived Here" 4:47
12. "You're The Reason" 3:10
13. "Rosita" 4:30
14. "Broken" 6:11

== Charts ==
Chart	Peak position
US Heatseekers Albums (Billboard)	20

== Personnel ==
- Cassidy - lead vocals
- Cathy Henderson - guitars
- Kristen Henderson - guitars
- Dena Tauriello - drums
- Jen Zielenbach - bass
