= Kristen Henderson =

American singer-songwriter

Kristen Ellis-Henderson
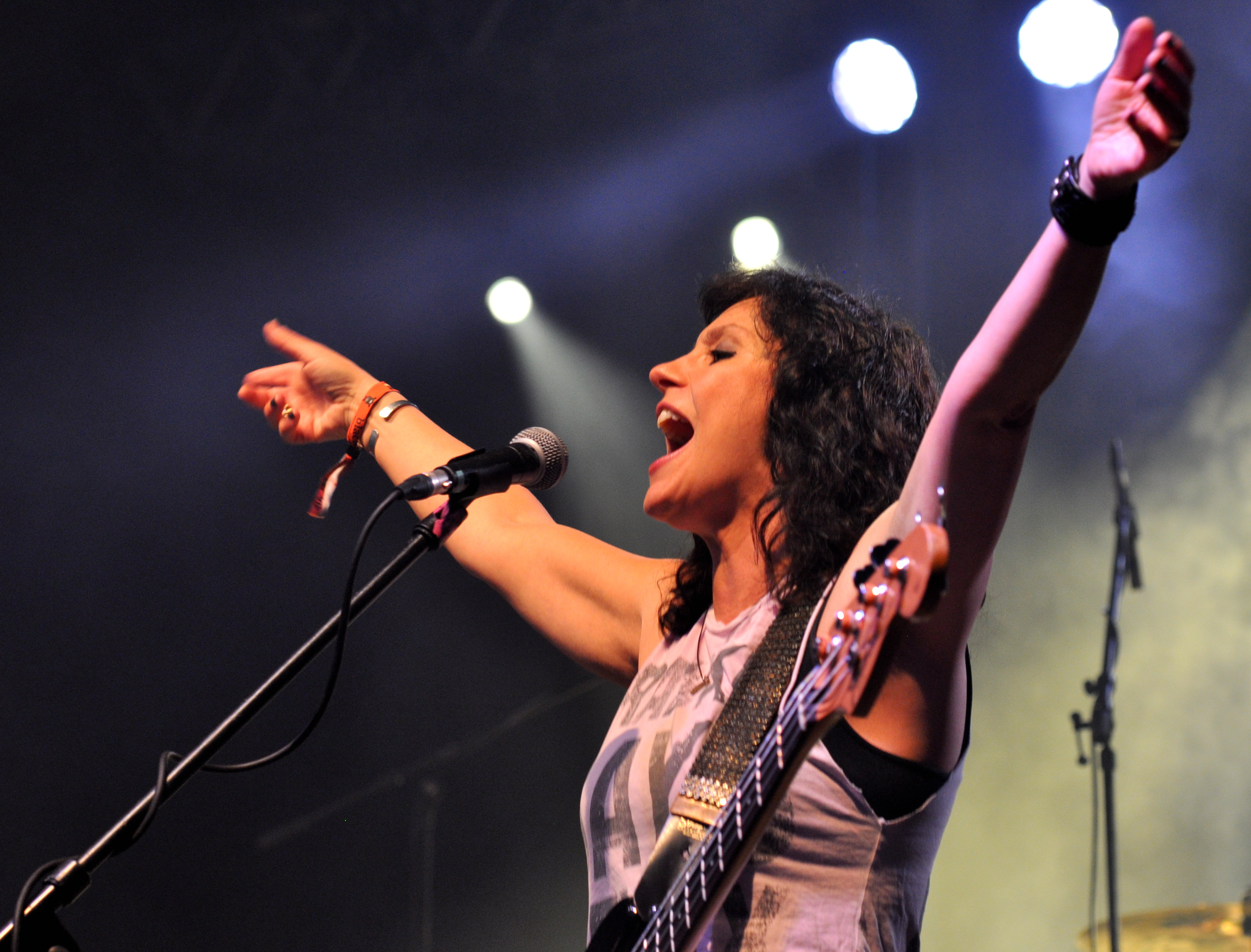
- Kristen Henderson performing with Antigone Rising in 2016

Background information
- Origin: New York City
- Genres: Rock
- Occupations: Guitarist and songwriter
- Spouse: Sarah Kate Ellis (m. 2011)

Kristen Ellis-Henderson is a founding member of the all-female rock band Antigone Rising. She is also the author of a memoir, Times Two: Two Women in Love and the Happy Family They Made, and a children's book, All Moms. She and her wife, Sarah Kate Ellis, are vocal advocates on LGBT issues, especially marriage and family equality.

== Personal life ==
Henderson grew up on Long Island in Glen Cove, NY. After graduating from Glen Cove High School she attended Bucknell University. The band known as Antigone Rising began in Greenwich Village, New York and consisted of Kristen and Cathy Henderson and two other girls from Bucknell. The members have changed over the years, but Kristen and Cathy stayed at the heart of the band. During their NYC circuit, they met both their drummer Dena Tauriello and lead singer Nina Camps who joined in 2008.

Henderson married Sarah Kate Ellis on October 22, 2011. Their wedding was the first performed in the Episcopal Church of New York after marriage equality passed in the state senate in June 2011. Henderson and Ellis were featured in a special New York Times Style section devoted to marriage equality on the day it became legal in New York, July 24, 2011. The Huffington Post also did a 3-part feature web series titled "Here Come the Brides", documenting the couple's wedding, from dress shopping to their eventual "I dos."

Henderson and Ellis (president & CEO of GLAAD - Gay & Lesbian Alliance Against Defamation), got pregnant on exactly the same day in May, 2008, and gave birth in February 2009; Henderson to their son Thomas, and Ellis to their daughter, Kate Spencer. They wrote a memoir about the experience titled Times Two, Two Women in Love and the Happy Family They Made, which came out on April 4, 2011, through Free Press, an imprint of Simon & Schuster. In 2013, both Henderson and Ellis were featured kissing on the cover of TIME Magazine as part of a feature on same-sex marriage in the United States.

== Antigone Rising ==
The band's first show was at Cafe Figaro on Bleecker St. in New York City's Greenwich Village. In 1998 Antigone Rising won a Levi's contest and played several of Sara McLachlan's New York area Lilith Fair dates, one in New York City's Bryant Park on June 1 in front of 10,000 people. From 2000 to 2008 the band spent most of its time touring the country and building a massive grassroots following playing up to 280 shows a year. In 2003, Antigone Rising signed a major label record deal with Jason Flom at Lava Records/Atlantic Records, and on May 11, 2005, their major label debut From the Ground Up was released in conjunction with Starbucks Hear Music label. The first single, "Don't Look Back," was co-written with Rob Thomas from Matchbox Twenty. Howard Schultz, now the former CEO of Starbucks, introduced them as a "band our entire company is very proud to call one of our own," before a performance at a Starbucks plant in York, PA, in 2010 and has continued to play Antigone Rising's music in Starbucks locations around the country. The band has toured with The Rolling Stones, Aerosmith, The Allman Brothers, Rob Thomas, The Bangles, Dave Matthews Band, Joan Jett and the Blackhearts and more.

In 2012, the United States government invited Antigone Rising to travel to Israel and the West Bank of Palestine to act as cultural ambassadors. The band toured the region extensively, performing in remote villages and schools during the day as part of an outreach program, and doing large concerts at night in nightclubs and theaters.

The band is currently signed to the distribution division of Joan Jett's Blackheart Records label, where they released a full-length CD in 2011 titled "23 Red." Funded entirely by fans through a Kickstarter campaign, the band raised close to $40K to complete their project.

The band's 2013 single, "That Was the Whiskey," was released on March 19, 2013. Henderson co-wrote the single with lead singer Nini Camps and Nashville songwriter Lori McKenna. The video for the single, directed by Mikki DelMonico, was in heavy rotation on CMT and CMT.com.
