= Sarah Kate Ellis =

American media executive (born 1971)

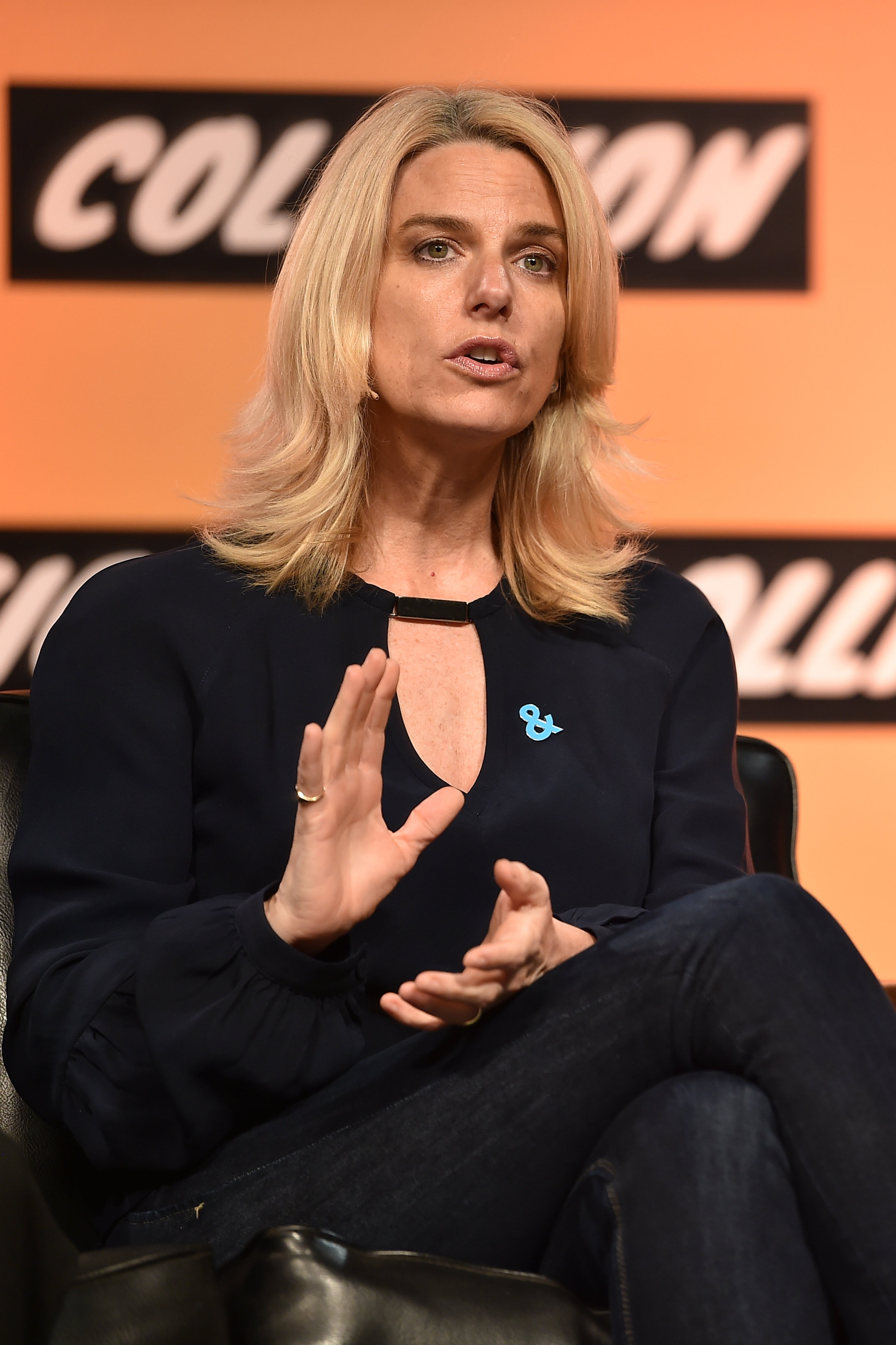
- Ellis in 2017
- Born: November 27, 1971 (age 54); Staten Island, New York, U.S.
- Education: Russell Sage College (BA)
- Occupations: Media executive, activist
- Spouse: Kristen Ellis-Henderson (m. 2011)

Sarah Kate Ellis (born November 27, 1971) is an American media executive and activist.

After Ellis's graduation from Russell Sage College in 1993 with a degree in Sociology and minor in Women's Studies, she began her career in media through the re-launch of Condé Nast's House & Garden.

In January 2014, Ellis was appointed president and CEO of GLAAD, the largest U.S. lesbian, gay, bisexual, and transgender (LGBT) media advocacy organization.

== Early years ==
Ellis was born and raised on Todt Hill, Staten Island, New York City, where she attended Staten Island Academy. She and her older brother Spencer were raised by their parents, Barbara and Ken Ellis. During her youth, Ellis was an athlete; she participated in field hockey and was a Junior Olympic swimmer. While attending Russell Sage College, Ellis led a media campaign against the college administration's attempt to shut down the only women's center on campus and, in her senior year of college, Ellis came out of the closet as a lesbian. In 2011, Ellis attended the Tuck Executive Education program at Tuck School of Business Dartmouth College and completed it in 2012.

== Media work ==
In 1995, Ellis began her profession in media. She first worked at mass media company Condé Nast, which laid the groundwork for her career advancement. Initially, Ellis worked at Condé Nast's House and Garden. From there, she moved to New York magazine as a senior manager, then to In Style as a director. Following her tenure at In Style, Ellis launched and directed the turnaround of Real Simple, which led her to Vogue where she oversaw ten lifestyle group brands. Ellis specialized in marketing and took on leadership roles. Extending the reach of her efforts, Ellis involved herself as co-chair of OUT at Time Inc., the company's LGBT employee resource group, where she led programming to spotlight the diversity of the LGBT community (2008–2013).

== LGBTQ rights activism ==
Ellis began her activism in 1992, when she marched on Washington to support women's access to abortion and then marched again in 1993 to support the rights of LGBT people.

On January 1, 2014, Ellis began as president and CEO of GLAAD, which works to move lesbian, gay, bisexual and transgender (LGBT) equality forward through improving media representation.

One of the first campaigns Ellis pursued at GLAAD was the organization's 2014 protest against the New York City St. Patrick's Day Parade, specifically the parade's ban of lesbian and gay participants. In an article in the New York Daily News, Ellis wrote about her Irish-American heritage and sexual orientation, calling on parade organizers to end the ban.

In 2015, Ellis was named to OUT Magazine’s annual OUT100 list of the most impactful and influential LGBTQ+ people.

In 2023, TIME Magazine included Ellis on its annual Time 100 list of the most influential people, and in 2024 was also named to Forbes Magazine's 50 Over 50 women's list.

In January 2024, on behalf of GLAAD, Ellis accepted the Governors Award at the Academy of Television Arts & Sciences’ 75th Primetime Emmy Awards in recognition of GLAAD's work “over nearly four decades to secure fair, accurate and diverse representation of the LGBTQ community in the media and entertainment industries and to advocate for LGBTQ equality.”

In August 2024, Ellis and GLAAD were the subjects of a The New York Times report that explored the organization's reimbursements of Ellis's "pattern of lavish spending", including luxury travel, home renovations and vacation property rentals. In response, GLAAD released a statement defending their commitment to Ellis's leadership and their payments towards her business expenses. A subsequent Washington Blade op-ed by former GLAAD vice-president Zeke Stokes contested The New York Times reporting as "riddled with bad reporting, innuendo, lies, mistruths, facts out of context, and misinformation."

In an October 2024 interview with Variety Magazine, Ellis responded noting that the Times article lacked “context of why those decisions were made — not for lavish reasons, but to answer a business need.” She also criticized the Times article for failing to disclose the fact that GLAAD was engaged in an ongoing campaign alleging bias in the publication's coverage of issues and topics related to transgender people and issues.

== Personal life ==
In 2011, Ellis married Kristen Henderson, co-founder of the all-female rock band Antigone Rising. Their wedding was the first official marriage ceremony for a same-sex couple in the Episcopal Church in the State of New York following passage of the state's Marriage Equality Act. In 2013, the couple was featured on the "Gay Marriage Already Won" cover of TIME Magazine.

Together, Ellis and Henderson have co-authored a memoir titled Times Two, Two Women in Love and the Happy Family They Made, released in 2011. The autobiography chronicled their simultaneous pregnancies and road to motherhood, and was nominated for a Stonewall Book Award. In 2023, the couple also published a children's book titled All Moms.

Prior to her tenure at GLAAD, Ellis and her wife were also profiled in a special New York Times Style section about marriage equality following its legalization in New York State and were the subjects of The Huffington Post's three-part documentary web series titled "Here Come the Brides." They were named one of GO Magazine's Most Captivating Couples of 2012.

== See also ==
- LGBTQ culture in New York City
- List of LGBTQ people from New York City
- List of LGBTQ rights activists
- List of LGBTQ writers
- New Yorkers in journalism
- NYC Pride March
