= Nod Your Head =

Single by Paul McCartney

from the album Memory Almost Full
- B-side: "222" (Only 7” Version)
- Released: 28 August 2007
- Recorded: March 2006
- Studio: Hog Hill Mill (Icklesham, UK)
- Genre: Noise rock
- Length: 1:58
- Label: MPL, Hear Music
- Songwriter: Paul McCartney
- Producer: David Kahne

Paul McCartney singles chronology
"Dance Tonight" (2007)	"Nod Your Head" (2007)	"Heal the Pain" (2008)

Memory Almost Full track listing
- 13 tracks: 1. "Dance Tonight"; 2. "Ever Present Past"; 3. "See Your Sunshine"; 4. "Only Mama Knows"; 5. "You Tell Me"; 6. "Mr. Bellamy"; 7. "Gratitude"; 8. "Vintage Clothes"; 9. "That Was Me"; 10. "Feet in the Clouds"; 11. "House of Wax"; 12. "End of the End"; 13. "Nod Your Head"

"Nod Your Head" is a song by Paul McCartney and the closing track to his 2007 album Memory Almost Full. The song was the third single from the album and it was released as a free download on 28 August 2007 via the iTunes Store, packaged with a music video. McCartney played all the instruments on the song.

== Track listing ==
1. "Nod Your Head" - 1:58
2. "Nod Your Head" (video) - 1:59

== Personnel ==
According to The Paul McCartney Project:

- Paul McCartney - vocals, electric guitar, bass, piano, keyboards, synthesizers, drums
