= Rasputin Music =

Independent chain of record stores

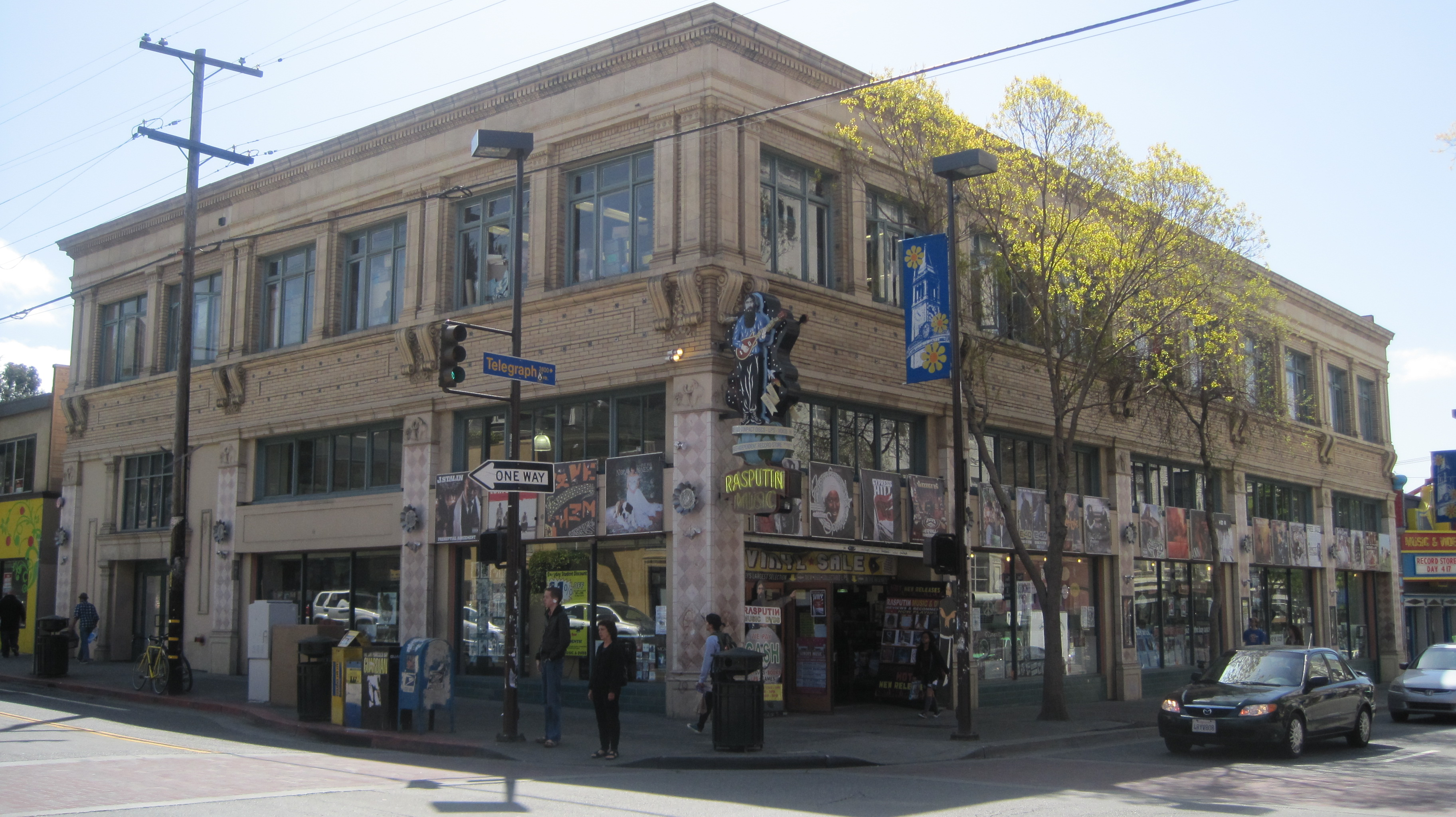
- Rasputin Music in Berkeley
- Industry: Record Stores
- Predecessor: Rasputin Records
- Founded: 1971; 55 years ago in Berkeley, California, United States
- Founder: Ken Sarachan
- Number of locations: 5 (Note: Down from a peak of 11 locations in 2015.)
- Area served: San Francisco Bay Area, California
- Website: Official website

Rasputin Music is the largest independent chain of record stores in the San Francisco Bay Area, California. It was founded as "Rasputin Records" in 1971 in Berkeley, California by entrepreneur Ken Sarachan. It is named after an early 20th century Russian political/religious figure Grigori Rasputin.

Rasputin Music operates five locations: the flagship store in Berkeley, Campbell, Pleasant Hill, Modesto and Fresno. Rasputin formerly operated stores in Mountain View (closed on May 1, 2016), Stockton (closed on March 24, 2019), Newark, Vallejo (moved to Fairfield, then closed on March 24, 2019), San Lorenzo (closed March 2020) and San Francisco (first location near Union Square and later moved to Haight Street, closed in 2020).

== History ==
The original Rasputin Music store was located at 2523 Durant Avenue where Sweetheart Café & Tea is located. They moved to Telegraph Avenue in the space now occupied by Blondie's Pizza, which was then also owned by Ken Sarachan. Rasputin moved across the street into a larger space at 2401 Telegraph Avenue when Odyssey Records went out of business. In the late 1970s it split into two separate locations, with one store specializing in rock music and the other in soul, jazz and other music genres. In July 1982, a fire at next-door Steve the Greek's restaurant destroyed the soul and jazz store. Rasputin's Berkeley operations were then consolidated into a single location. It currently operates at the corner of Telegraph Avenue and Channing Way.

Although in recent years its prices have become more commensurate with those of other music stores, Rasputin was known for offering low prices on new and used CDs, DVDs, and vinyl records compared to other Berkeley music stores like Leopold and Tower Records. Its selection of new vinyl is unusually rich, as is its selection of used CDs and DVDs.

Rasputin occasionally features in-store performances by top musicians and bands. Metallica made its first in-store appearance in almost a decade at the Rasputin Mountain View store as part of the April 19, 2008 "Record Store Day". Metallica also performed there on record store day in 2016.

== Ken Sarachan business practices and properties ==
Ken Sarachan is considered a controversial figure in Berkeley because of the apparent neglect of several properties he owns on Telegraph Avenue. His other businesses and properties include Bear Basics and Anastasia's Vintage Clothing. After much planning and negotiation with the city, Mad Monk Center for Anachronistic Media opened in April 2016, a 10,000 sq ft book and record store with plans to open a cafe and become an event venue. It abruptly closed permanently on February 26, 2018. He also owns 2503 and 2509 Haste and an empty lot at 2501 Haste Street.

The lot at 2501 Haste was the site of a former single room occupancy hotel which catered to low-income residents. It was damaged beyond repair by fires in 1986 and 1990. The lot has been vacant for over 25 years and is the subject of innumerable blight complaints. It was purchased in 1991 in an apparent attempt to prevent the expansion or move of the Amoeba Music to the address. According to Aaron Cometbus in issue 51 of Cometbus, The Loneliness of the Electric Menorah, Sarachan personally delivered more than a million dollars to the property owner in a suitcase to buy the lot out from under Amoeba and the developer. In 2005, Sarachan filed plans to build an apartment and retail complex on the site, but these never came to fruition. In January 2012, the City of Berkeley sued Sarachan over the property. Sarachan eventually sold the property to the development company West Builders, and a student dorm building was completed in 2020.

Sarachan is also known for placing new copycat businesses next to perceived competitors. In addition to his actions to prevent Amoeba's expansion in Berkeley, Rasputin Music opened a location in 2013 on Haight Street in San Francisco less than a block from an Amoeba Records location. In 2013, following the success of independent ice cream shop CREAM, Inc. at the corner of Channing and Telegraph and contentious Berkeley city hearings, Sarachan opened an ice cream counter called Scoop Dreams directly across the street. Scoop Dreams, which is now closed, was located at the former security counter in the front of Rasputin Music, about ten yards from CREAM.

== Acquisition of former Tower Records locations ==
Rasputin Music acquired the leases of four former Tower Records locations: Concord (where the Pleasant Hill store was relocated), Mountain View, Fresno, and Stockton. The Concord store, despite having been under Rasputin's management since 2007, still carried Tower Records signage with no mention of Rasputin; a poster displayed in the window called the Tower Records signage a "Historical Anomaly." The Concord location closed in 2013 and moved back to its original Pleasant Hill location.

The Mountain View store at San Antonio Road and El Camino Real was closed at the end of 2011. It reopened two weeks later at a new location about a mile southeast on El Camino Real. On May 1, 2016, that Mountain View location closed. The Stockton store located at 6623 Pacific Ave in Lincoln Center South which opened in the former Tower Records building on April 28, 2007, closed on May 6, 2016, and was officially evicted on May 10, 2016.
