= Amoeba Music =

American independent record store chain

Coordinates: 37.76892°N 122.45265°W

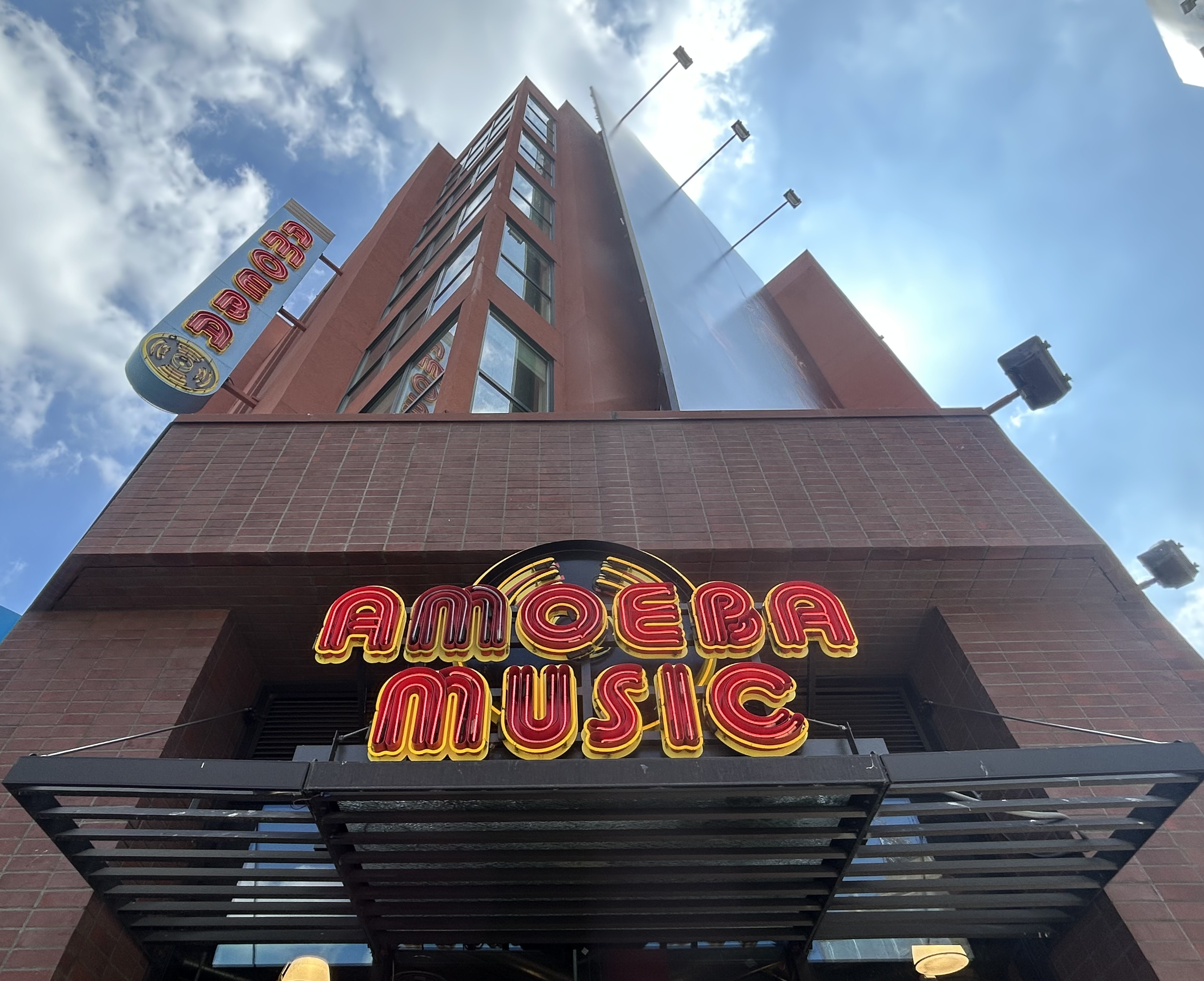
- The Amoeba Music store on Hollywood Blvd in Los Angeles, California
- Type: Private
- Industry: Retail
- Founded: 1990; 36 years ago Berkeley, California, U.S.
- Headquarters: U.S.
- Number of locations: 3
- Area served: California, United States (San Francisco Bay Area and Los Angeles)
- Products: Records, compact discs, home video, posters, books, collectibles, accessories
- Owners: Jim Henderson, one of four co-owners
- Website: www.amoeba.com

Amoeba Music is an American independent music store chain with locations in the California cities of Berkeley, San Francisco, and Hollywood, Los Angeles. It stocks media, primarily music via vinyl records, compact disc, and cassette tapes, but also films and television programs via DVD and VHS. Its music selection includes rock, pop, blues, soul, funk, rap, and jazz. It is popular as a tourist destination for fans of physical media or music in general. It was founded in 1990 in Berkeley, California, and remains in operation, having survived the decline of CD sales in the 2000s. Amoeba stores generally focus on vinyl and compact discs.

== History ==
=== Original Berkeley store (1990) ===
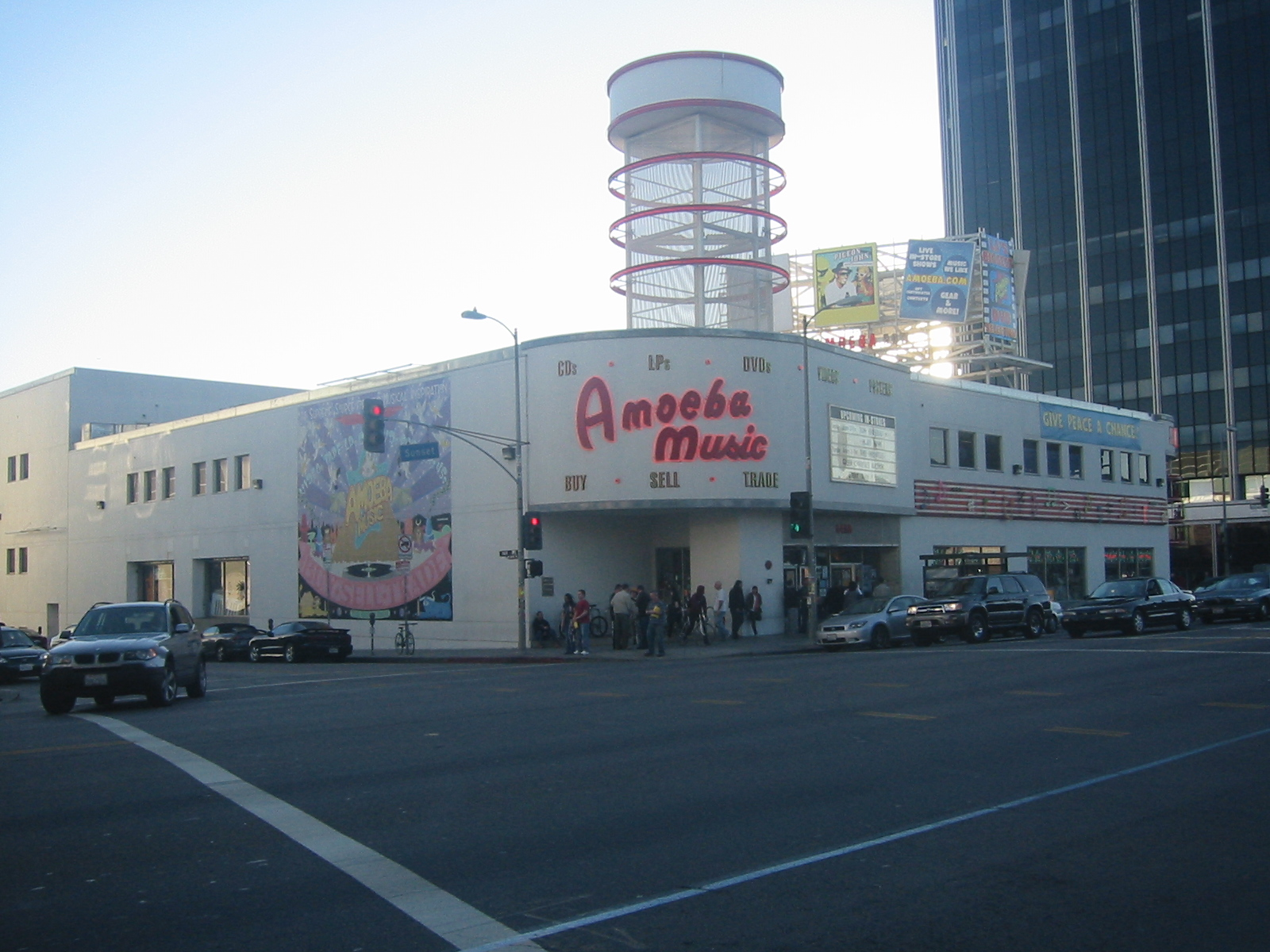
The former Amoeba Music building on Sunset Boulevard in Hollywood

Amoeba Music was founded by former employees of nearby Rasputin Records and opened on Telegraph Avenue in Berkeley in 1990. The original founding members were Marc Weinstein, Dave Prinz, and Mike Boyder. The Amoeba logo was designed by comic book artist Shepherd Hendrix. Primarily operating on reselling used goods, Amoeba has survived the decline of CD sales since the early 2000s with its trade-in program and the advent of the vinyl revival.

=== Second store (San Francisco, 1997) ===
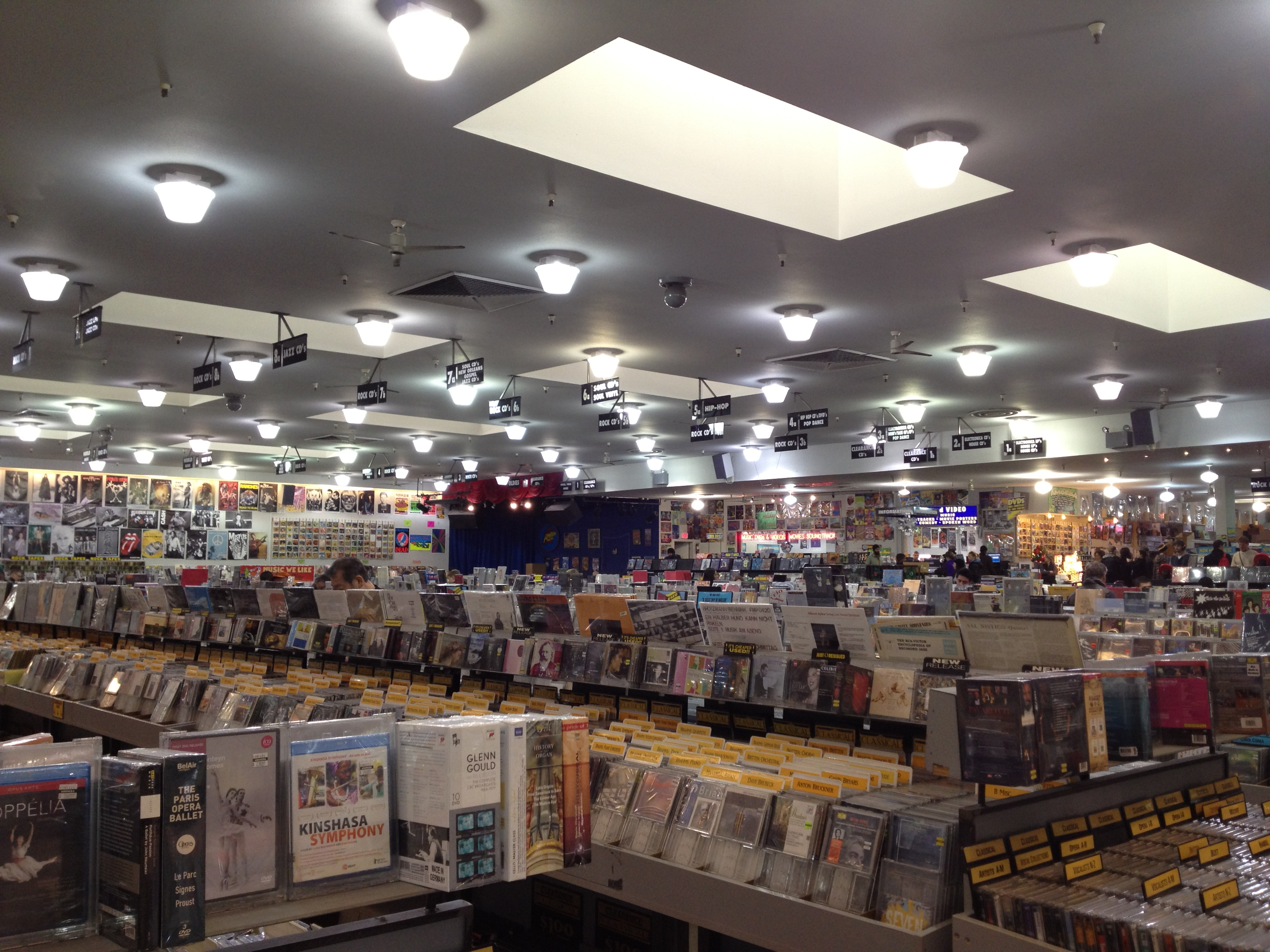
Inside Amoeba Music in San Francisco in 2011

A second location, in San Francisco, opened on November 15, 1997, in the Haight-Ashbury neighborhood near Golden Gate Park. It is located in the former 24,000-square-foot (2,200 m^{2}) Park Bowl bowling alley. It regularly stocks upwards of 100,000 CDs, vinyl records, and audio cassettes, both new and used.

=== Third store (Los Angeles, 2001) ===
A third location, in Los Angeles, opened on November 17, 2001, on Sunset Boulevard at Cahuenga Boulevard in Hollywood. At the time of its opening, the store planned to stock as many as 250,000 titles, which would have placed it among the largest independent music stores in the world. According to Los Angeles Times writer Michael Hiltzik, the location "instantly became a Hollywood landmark."

Amoeba's world music department was headed by Robert Leaver, co-founder of the Round World Music record shop and label in San Francisco. He also worked as a buyer of international records for Amoeba's Berkeley location. The stores also trade in movies, though secondarily to their music business. Each location has a smaller collection of movies on DVD, VHS, Laserdisc, and Blu-ray. In addition, each store maintains a selection of music-related posters and artwork for purchase, as well as Amoeba-branded merchandise. The Sunset Boulevard store had an entire second floor dedicated to DVD and Blu-ray at its original location. In addition, Amoeba Music frequently held free shows during store hours with locally and nationally known artists from a wide variety of genres.

In 2015, Amoeba sold the Sunset Boulevard property to a holding company but continued to lease the space. In 2018, it was announced that the owners would demolish the site and replace it with a contemporary glass-and-steel tower with residential units and commercial space, and Amoeba would be moving. On April 27, 2020, Amoeba announced that due to the COVID-19 pandemic, the Sunset Boulevard location was closed permanently ahead of schedule. Along with the statewide stay-at-home order issued by California governor Gavin Newsom in the COVID-19 pandemic, many non-essential stores were told to close to prevent the spread of COVID-19. Amoeba subsequently started a fundraising campaign on GoFundMe to pay the bills, as most of their income is derived from in-store purchases.

=== Relocated Los Angeles store (2021) ===
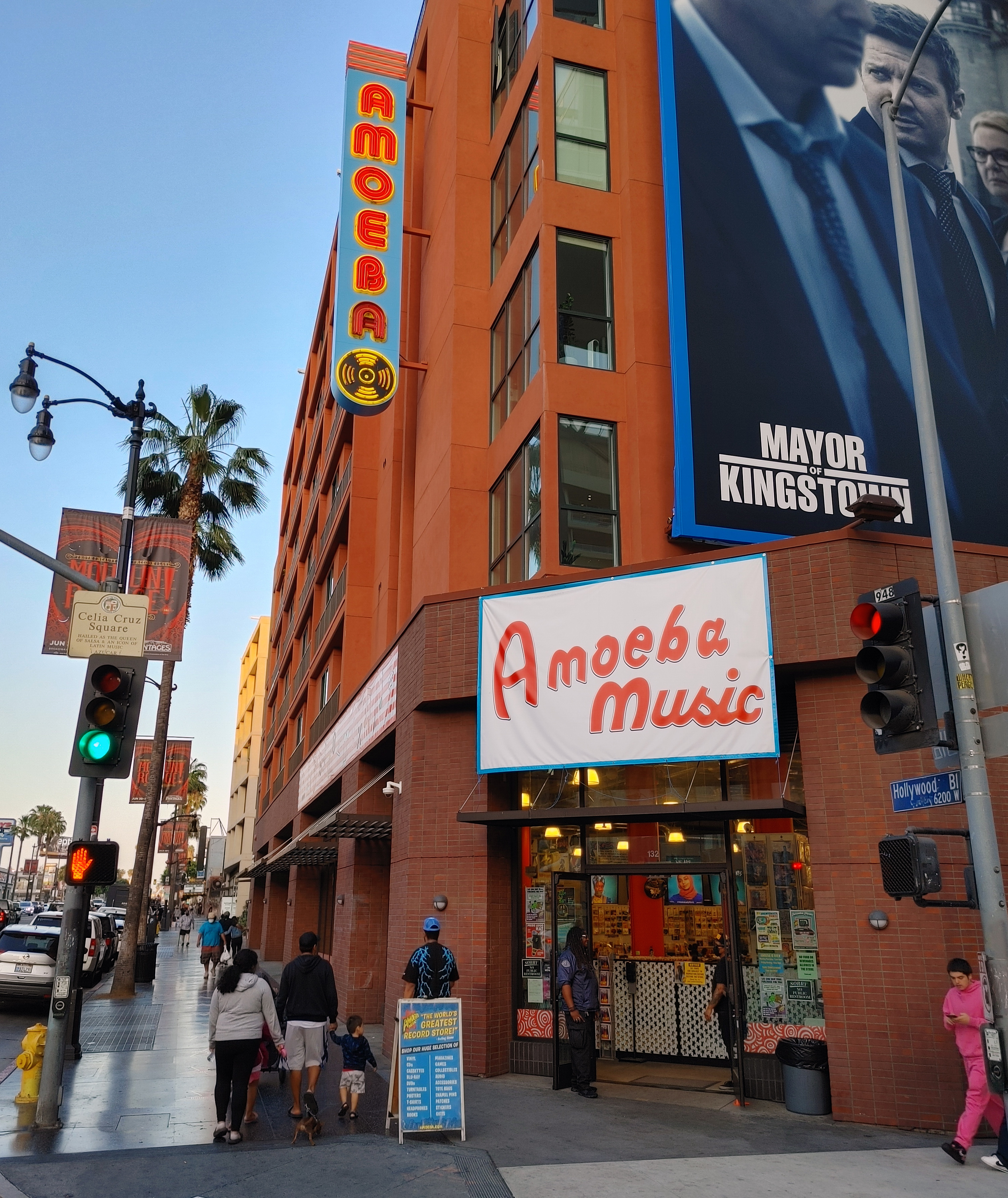
New Amoeba Music store on Hollywood Blvd in the Hollywood and Vine area in Los Angeles, 2022

Amoeba found a new location for its Los Angeles store on Hollywood Boulevard at Argyle Avenue. It is located inside a newly constructed apartment complex, the El Centro. The store's vast collections of music CDs, LPs, DVDs, and books were temporarily in storage during construction at the new site during 2020 and 2021. The new location opened on April 1, 2021.

The new Amoeba Music store is located near the popular Pantages and Fonda Theatres in the Hollywood and Vine area. Continuing the tradition of free live shows for customers at the store, the new Amoeba Music frequently holds free shows during store hours with locally and nationally known artists from a wide variety of genres. The band Red Hot Chili Peppers gave a free live performance at the store for Amoeba Music customers after receiving a star on the Hollywood Walk of Fame near the entrance to the Amoeba Music store on March 31, 2022. George Clinton, Woody Harrelson, and Bob Forrest unveiled the star at the ceremony.

== YouTube channel ==
Amoeba's YouTube channel was created on January 27, 2006, and is home to interviews, recordings of live performances at Amoeba locations, and the award-winning series What's In My Bag? with various "featuring artists and tastemakers sharing what they found shopping at Amoeba."

== Popular culture ==
The Hollywood store was included as a playable venue in the 2008 music game Guitar Hero World Tour. Paul McCartney recorded his EP Amoeba's Secret (which was also released as Amoeba Gig in its entirety in 2019) at an unannounced live performance at the Hollywood location on June 27, 2007.

== Gallery ==
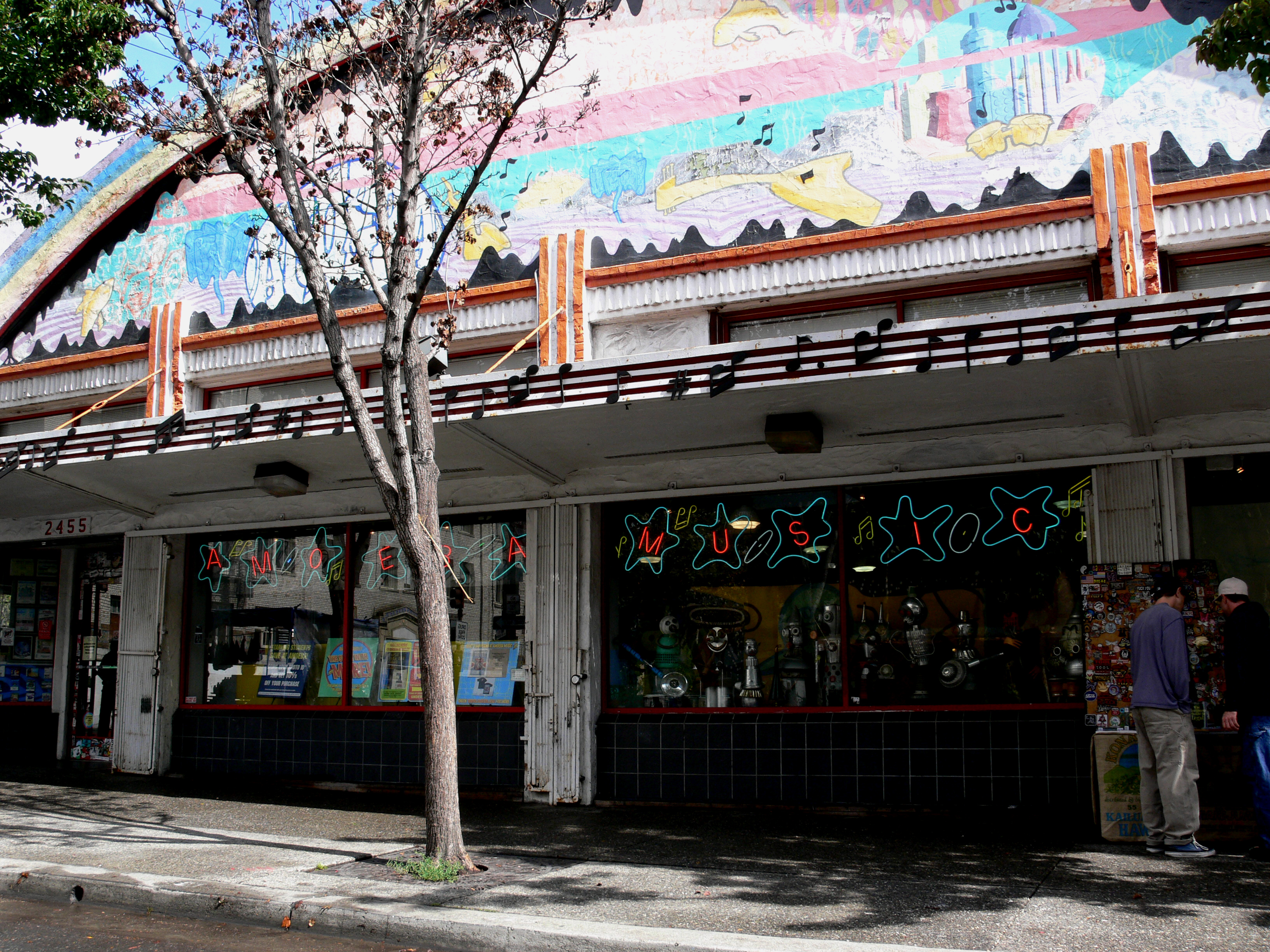
Berkeley store

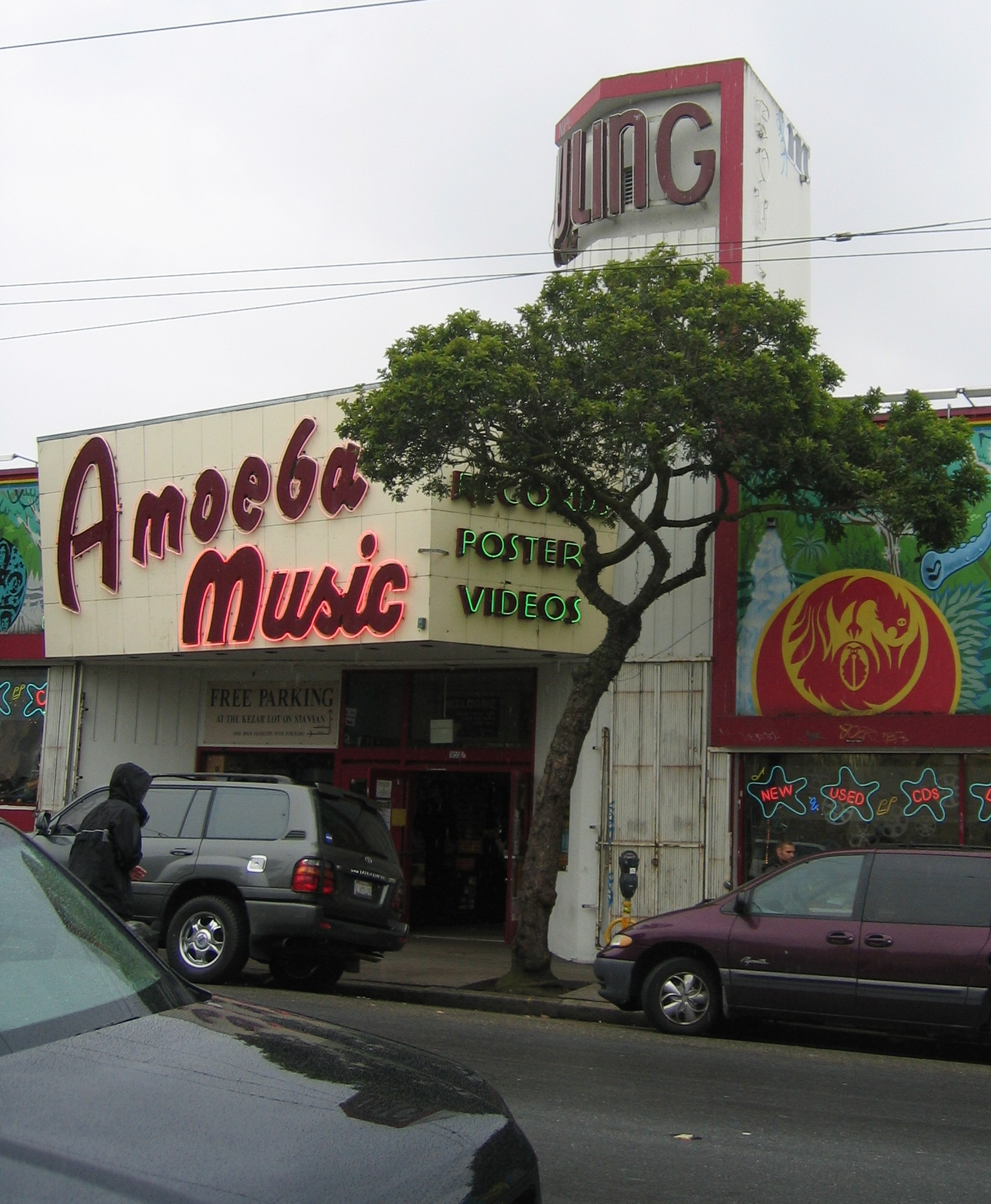
San Francisco store

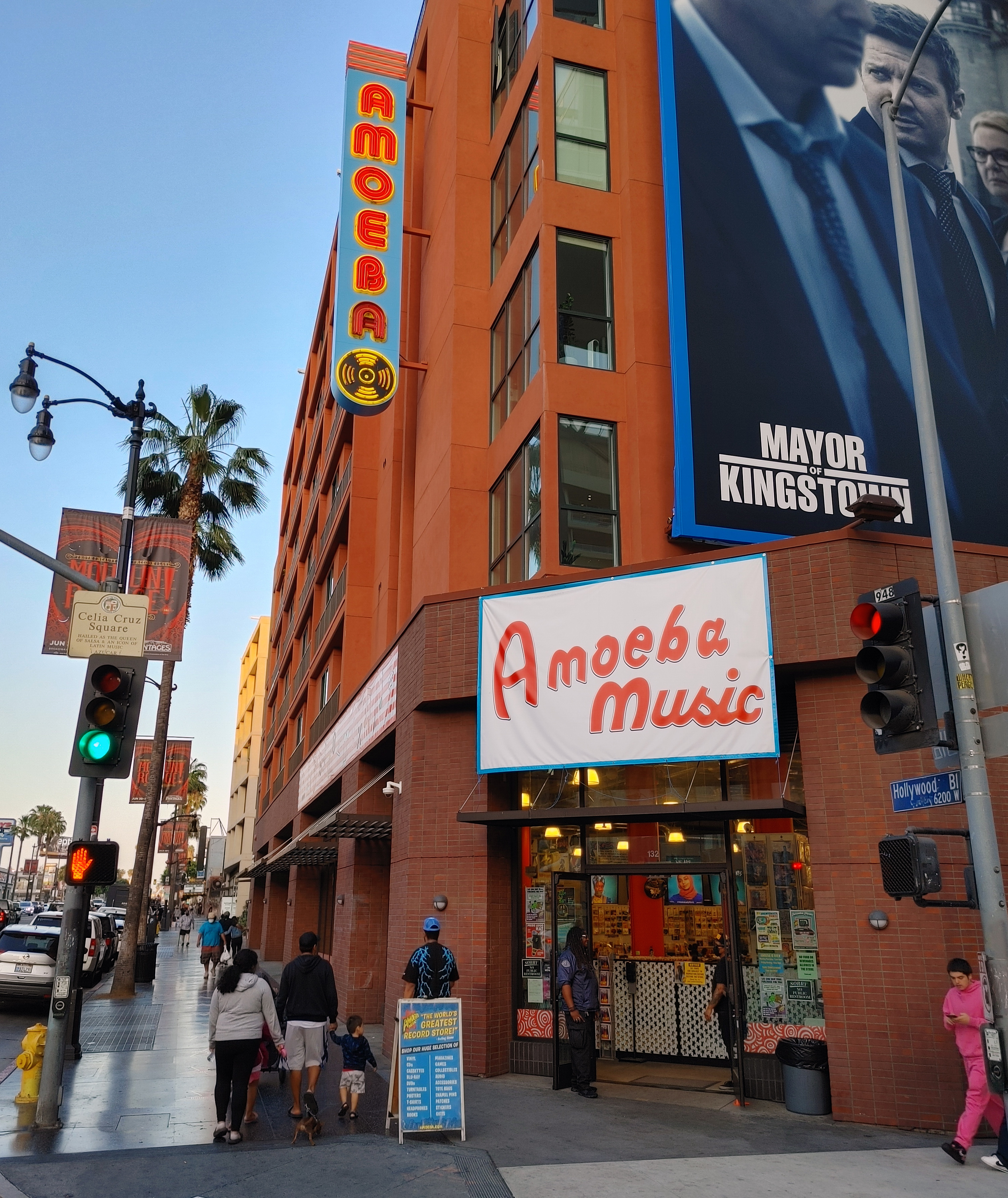
Hollywood store

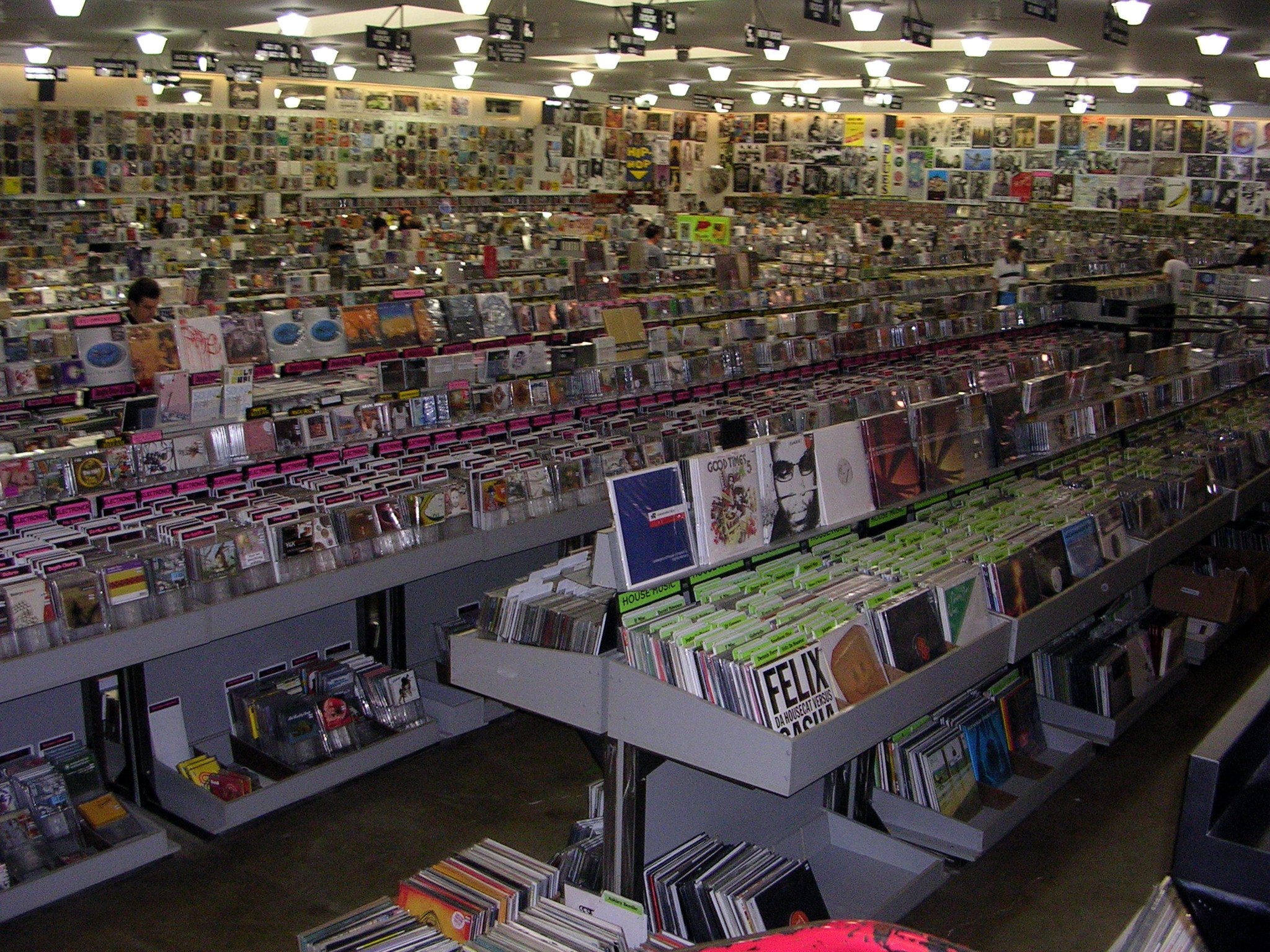
Inside the San Francisco location

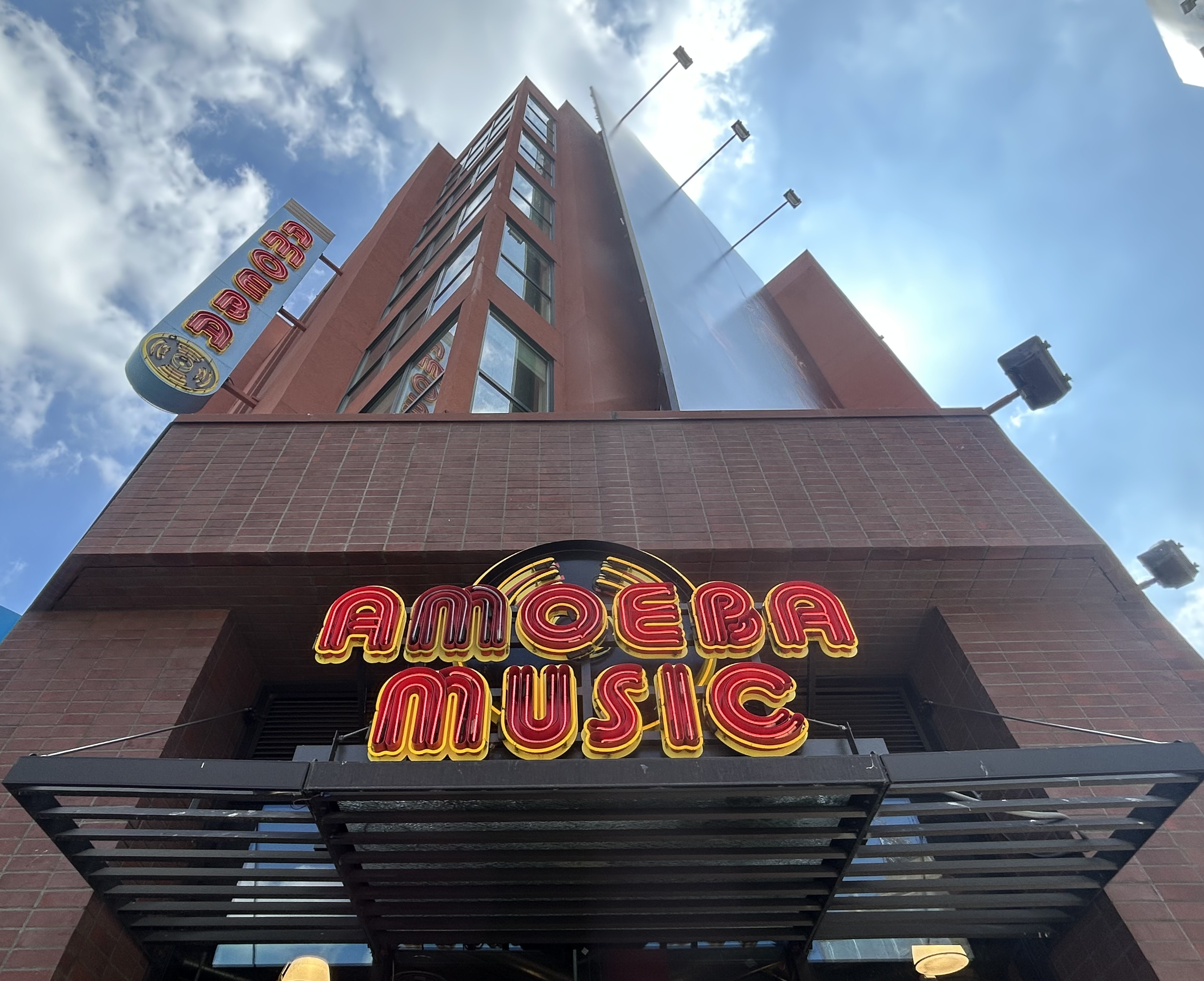
Hollywood store, September 2025
