= Nini Camps =

American folk rock singer-songwriter

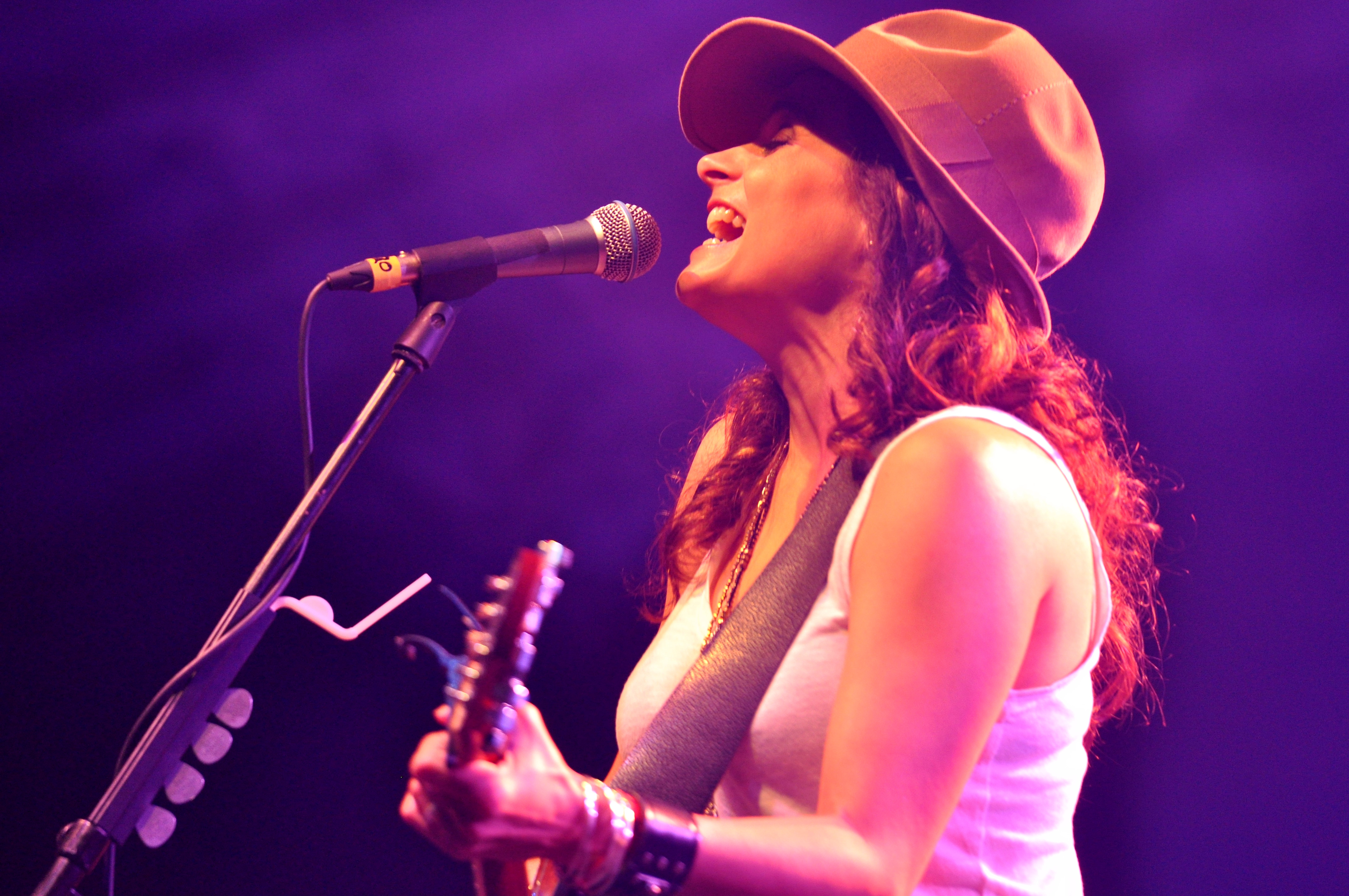
Camps performing with Antigone Rising in 2016

Nini Camps is an American folk rock singer-songwriter. She writes music for films and TV shows, and also performs as the lead singer of the all-female band Antigone Rising.

== Personal life ==
In 2009, Camps and music executive Brooke Primont were married in a civil ceremony in Toronto, Canada.

== Discography ==
- Love Pie
- So Long
- Driving You Out
