= Etymology of place names in Los Angeles County, California =

The following is a non-exhaustive list of the etymologies of the place names in Los Angeles, California.

== A-K ==
Place name	Source
Abbot Kinney Boulevard	Abbot Kinney, founder of Venice, California
Aliso Street	Named after the aliso, the old sycamore that stood at the entrance of Jean-Louis Vignes' winery
Alvarado Street	Juan Bautista Alvarado, Mexican Governor of Alta California
Baldwin Hills neighborhood	E. J. "Lucky" Baldwin, mining and real estate investor
Beaudry Avenue	Prudent Beaudry, Los Angeles mayor
Bel-Air neighborhood	Alphonzo E. Bell, Sr., owner of the "Buenos Aires Ranch"
Brooklyn Avenue	After Brooklyn, New York, in honor of the many Jewish Americans living in Boyle Heights at the time
Cahuenga Boulevard; Cahuenga Pass	Cahuenga, the Spanish name for the Tongva village of Kawengna, meaning place of the mountain
César E. Chávez Avenue	César Chávez Mexican-American farm worker, labor leader, and civil rights activist
Crenshaw neighborhood Crenshaw Boulevard	George Crenshaw, banker and real estate developer
Figueroa Avenue; Figueroa Street	José Figueroa, Mexican Governor of Alta California
Glassell Park neighborhood	Andrew Glassell real estate lawyer and owner
Griffith Park and Griffith Observatory	Griffith J. Griffith, Welsh-American industrialist and philanthropist
Huntington Drive	Henry E. Huntington, railroad magnate and business man

== L-Z ==
Place name	Source
La Brea Avenue	La Brea, the Spanish name for the oil fields near present-day Hancock Park, meaning tar
Lankershim Boulevard	Isaac B. Lankershim, German-American landowner
Leimert Park	Walter H. "Tim" Leimert
Los Feliz neighborhood Los Feliz Boulevard	Rancho Los Feliz, originally granted to José Vincente Feliz
Micheltorena Street	Manuel Micheltorena, Mexican Governor of Alta California
Mulholland Drive; Mulholland Highway	William Mulholland, water-services pioneer in Southern California
Olvera Street	Augustín Olvera, early Los Angeles judge
Olympic Boulevard	Formerly 10th Street; First referred to as Olympic Blvd in 1931 in honor of X Olympiad in 1932 (name change official in 1935)
Pico Boulevard	Pío Pico, last Mexican Governor of Alta California
Rosecrans Avenue	William Rosecrans, Civil War general and owner of Rancho San Pedro
Sepulveda Boulevard; Sepulveda Pass	Sepúlveda family
Sherman Oaks neighborhood Sherman Way	Moses Sherman, land developer and streetcar line owner
Silver Lake neighborhood Silver Lake Boulevard; Silver Lake Reservoir	Herman Silver
Slauson Avenue	J. S. Slauson, land developer
Tarzana neighborhood	Tarzana Ranch, owned by the creator of Tarzan, Edgar Rice Burroughs
Tujunga neighborhood Tujunga Avenue	From the Tongva term Tuyunga, meaning mountain range from tu'xuu = old woman tu'xuunga = place of the old woman
Van Nuys neighborhood Van Nuys Boulevard	Isaac Newton Van Nuys, businessman, banker and real estate developer
Vignes Street	Jean Louis Vignes, French settler in Los Angeles who planted European grapes
Watts neighborhood	Charles H. Watts, real estate developer
Wilmington neighborhood	Wilmington, Delaware, birthplace of founder Phineas Banning
Wilshire Boulevard	Gaylord Wilshire, land developer, publisher and outspoken socialist
Workman Street, Lincoln Heights	William H. Workman, Los Angeles mayor
