= Antigone Rising =

American rock band

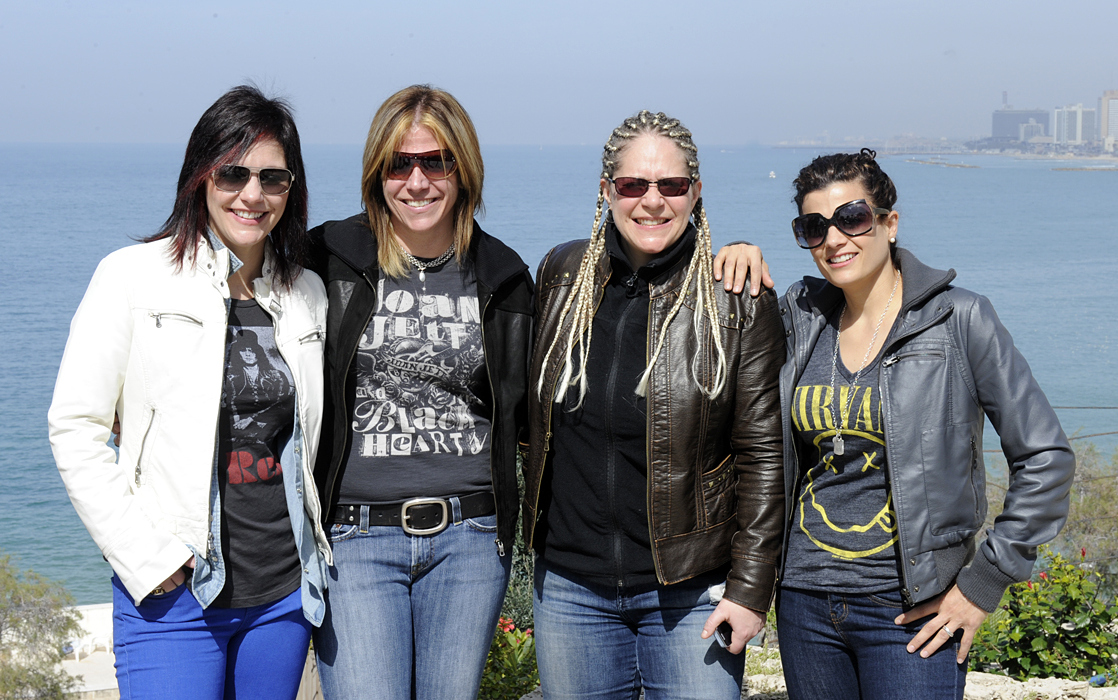
- Antigone Rising in 2012 (l-r): Kristen Henderson, Dena Tauriello, Cathy Henderson, Nini Camps

Background information
- Origin: New York City, New York
- Genres: Rock, alternative country
- Years active: 1998–present
- Labels: Lava Records/Atlantic Records; Hear Music; Blackheart Records; Rising Shine Records
- Members: Kristen Henderson; Cathy Henderson; Nini Camps
- Past members: Susan "Cassidy" Catanzaro; Dena Tauriello; Penelope "Peppy" Kokines; Suzanne Obolsky; Jen Zielenbach
- Website: www.antigonerising.com

Antigone Rising is a rock band based in New York City. The band's current line up is Cathy Henderson (lead guitar), Kristen Henderson (bass guitar and drums), and Nini Camps (lead vocals and rhythm guitar). The band formed a nonprofit called Girls Rising in 2014 to inspire girls and LGBTQ youth to pursue nontraditional careers. The annual Girls Rising music festival takes place annually and has featured artists such as Shawn Colvin, Lisa Loeb, Paula Cole, Carnie Wilson amongst others. Melissa Etheridge and Joan Jett have both created Girls Rising grants to help kids pursue nontraditional paths.

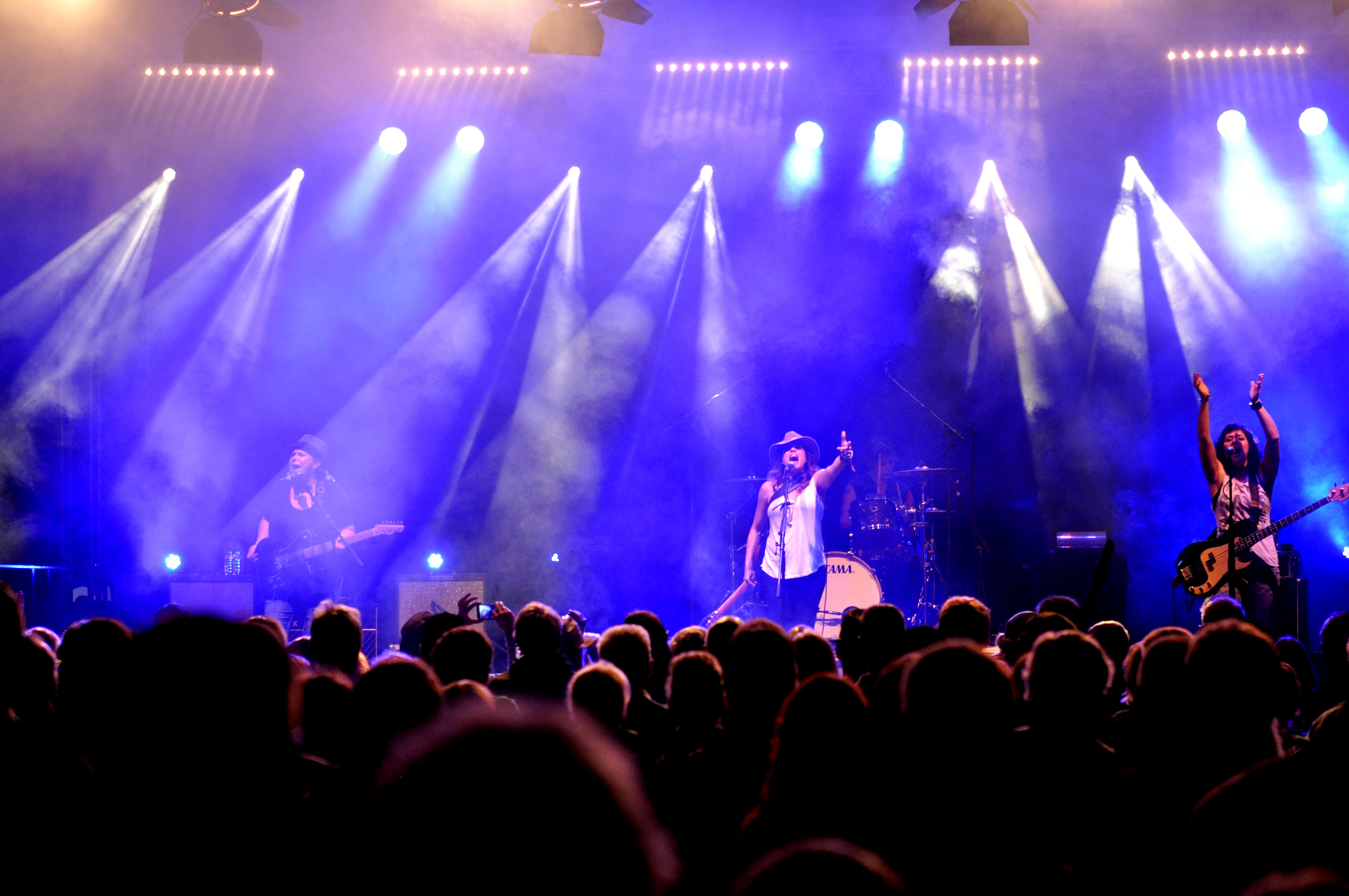
Antigone Rising performing live at the Blacksheep Festival (Germany) 2016

== History ==
The band originally met at Bucknell University and was formed in Greenwich Village, New York City, with sisters Cathy (guitar) and Kristen Henderson (guitar/drums), Penelope "Peppy" Kokines as lead vocalist and Suzanne Obolsky on vocals and percussion.

In 1999, the band recruited Cassidy as the lead singer.

Their first four albums were recorded mostly with independent labels and financed through fan donations. In 2003, they signed up with Lava Records, a label personally run by Atlantic Records chairman Jason Flom.

In 2005, they became the first artists to be promoted in Starbucks' Hear Music Series, created to discover and spotlight new music. The high visibility, exclusive sale, in-store promotion and airplay at Starbucks across the United States helped the band's acoustic album, From the Ground Up, sell over 450,000 copies by the end of 2005. The album's single, "Don't Look Back", gained popularity among country audiences after its video received heavy airplay on CMT.

Flom departed Lava in 2005. The band's deal with the label continued until 2008. A new album, Tales From Wonderland was recorded in 2007 but not released.

In 2008, Cassidy left the band. Cassidy released the band's final album, Tales From Wonderland without permission as Sink Or Swim under the name The Cassidy Project. The other band members were not happy about this, with Kristen Henderson publicly voicing their displeasure. Two songs were removed from "Sink Or Swim" before its release, where Cassidy's name did not appear on the writing credits.

In 2009, Nini Camps, having made several guest appearances with the band, officially joined as the lead singer and rhythm guitarist. Kristen Henderson, now known as Kristen Ellis-Henderson, shifted from rhythm guitar to bass. Also in 2009, both Ellis-Henderson and Camps became mothers to children.

A studio CD, 23 Red, was released in 2011, distributed through Joan Jett's Blackheart Records Group.

The band line up as of 2013 was Kristen Ellis-Henderson on bass guitar and backing vocals, Cathy Henderson on lead guitar and backing vocals, Dena Tauriello on drums and Nini Camps on rhythm guitar and lead vocals.

The band's 2013 single, "That Was The Whiskey", was co-written with the Nashville songwriter Lori McKenna.

In 2014, the band released an EP, Whiskey & Wine Vol. I. Concurrent with the EP's release, the band also announced a fundraising drive for their ongoing tour, with 5 percent of the proceeds being donated to the pro-LGBTQ advocacy organization GLAAD.

In 2015, the band released another EP, Whiskey & Wine Vol. II.

== Touring ==
In their early years, Antigone Rising toured widely, and have shared stages with the Bangles, Joan Jett, the Rolling Stones, moe., Rob Thomas, Aerosmith, and the Allman Brothers. They performed at the Lilith Fair in 1998 and at SXSW in 2005.

== Members ==
- Nini Camps - lead vocals, rhythm guitar
- Kristen Henderson - drums, bass guitar, vocals
- Cathy Henderson - lead guitar, vocals
- Cassidy Joy Catanzaro - lead vocals through 1999-2008. Bio, Interview
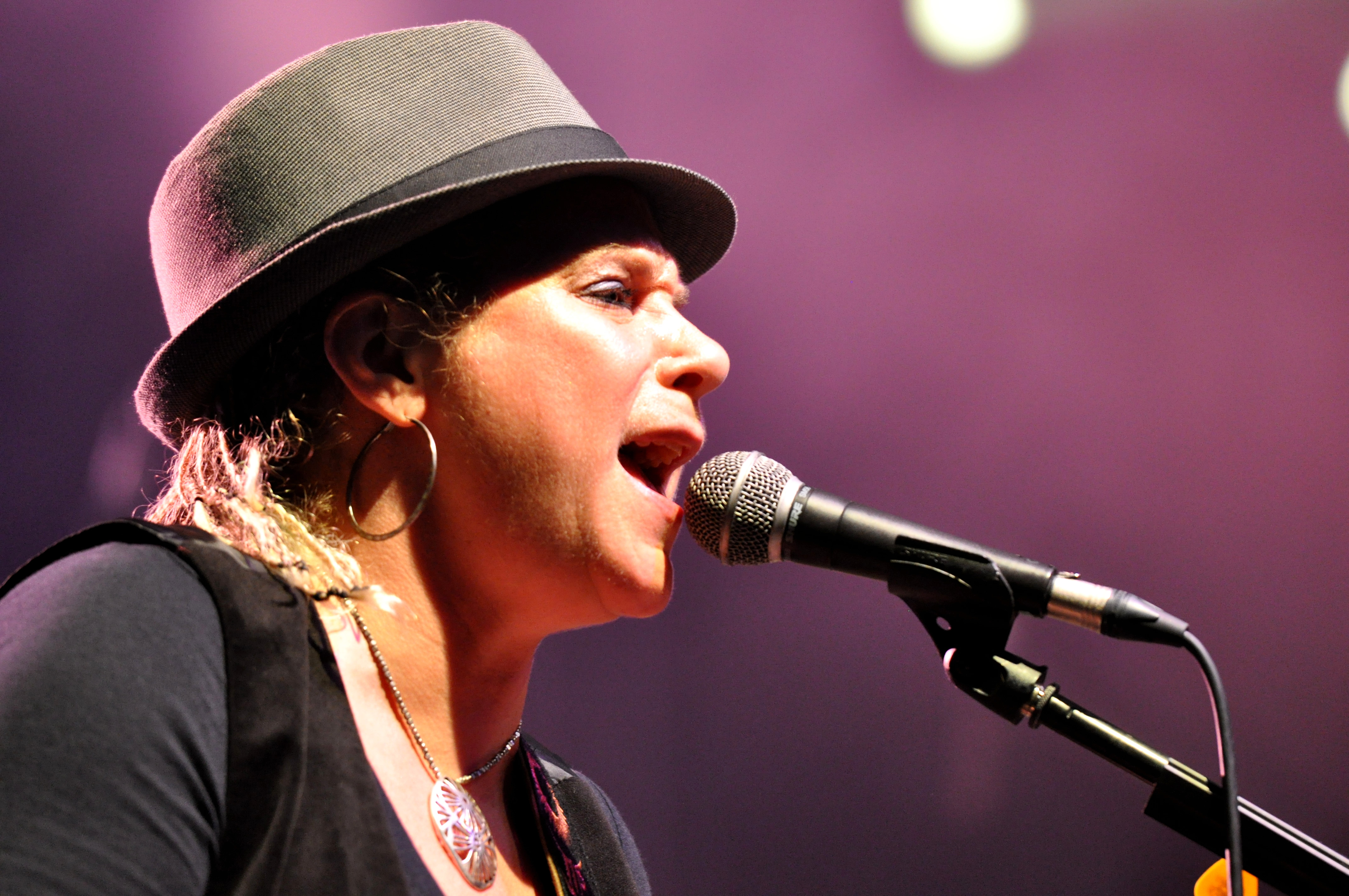
Cathy Henderson in 2016

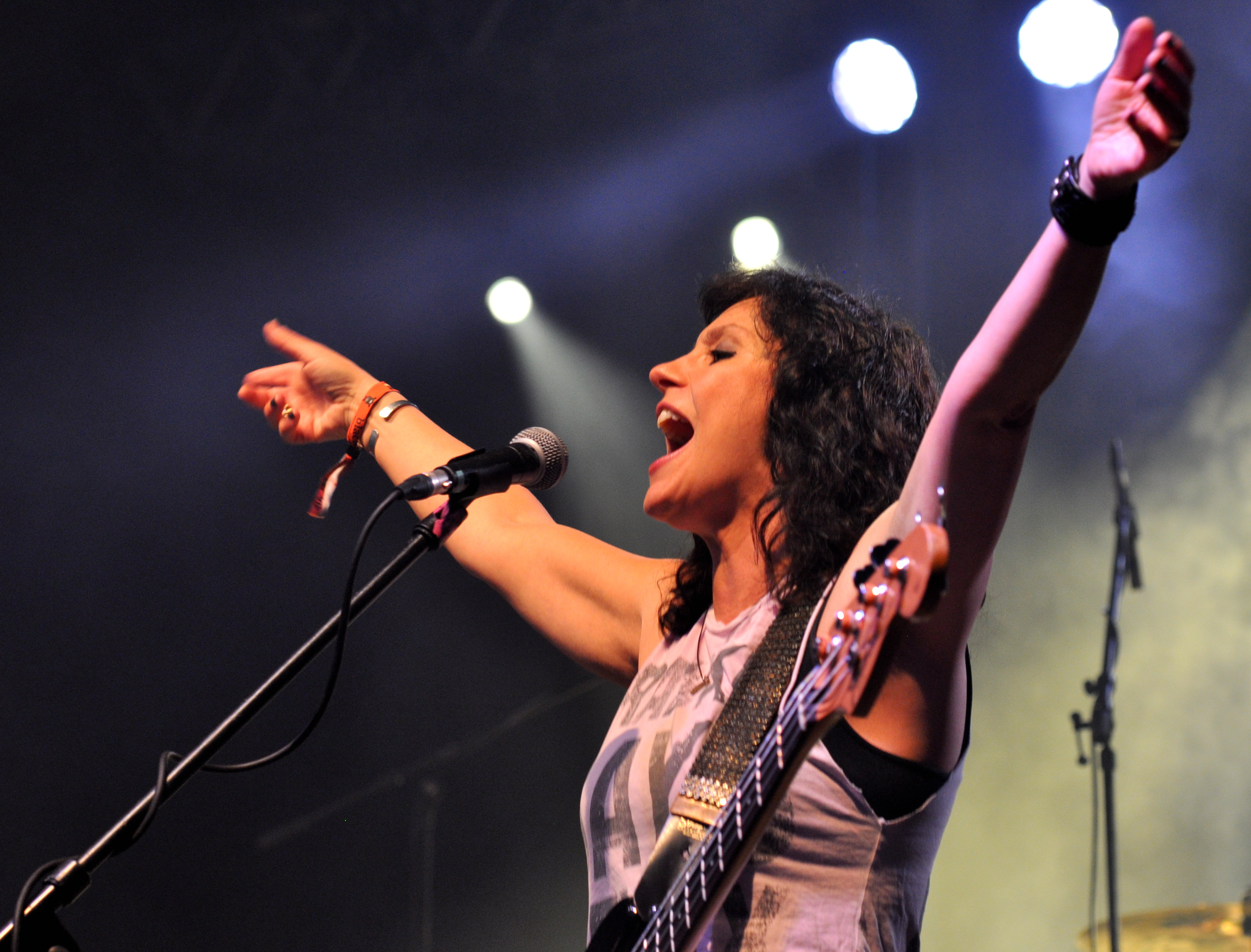
Kristen Henderson in 2016

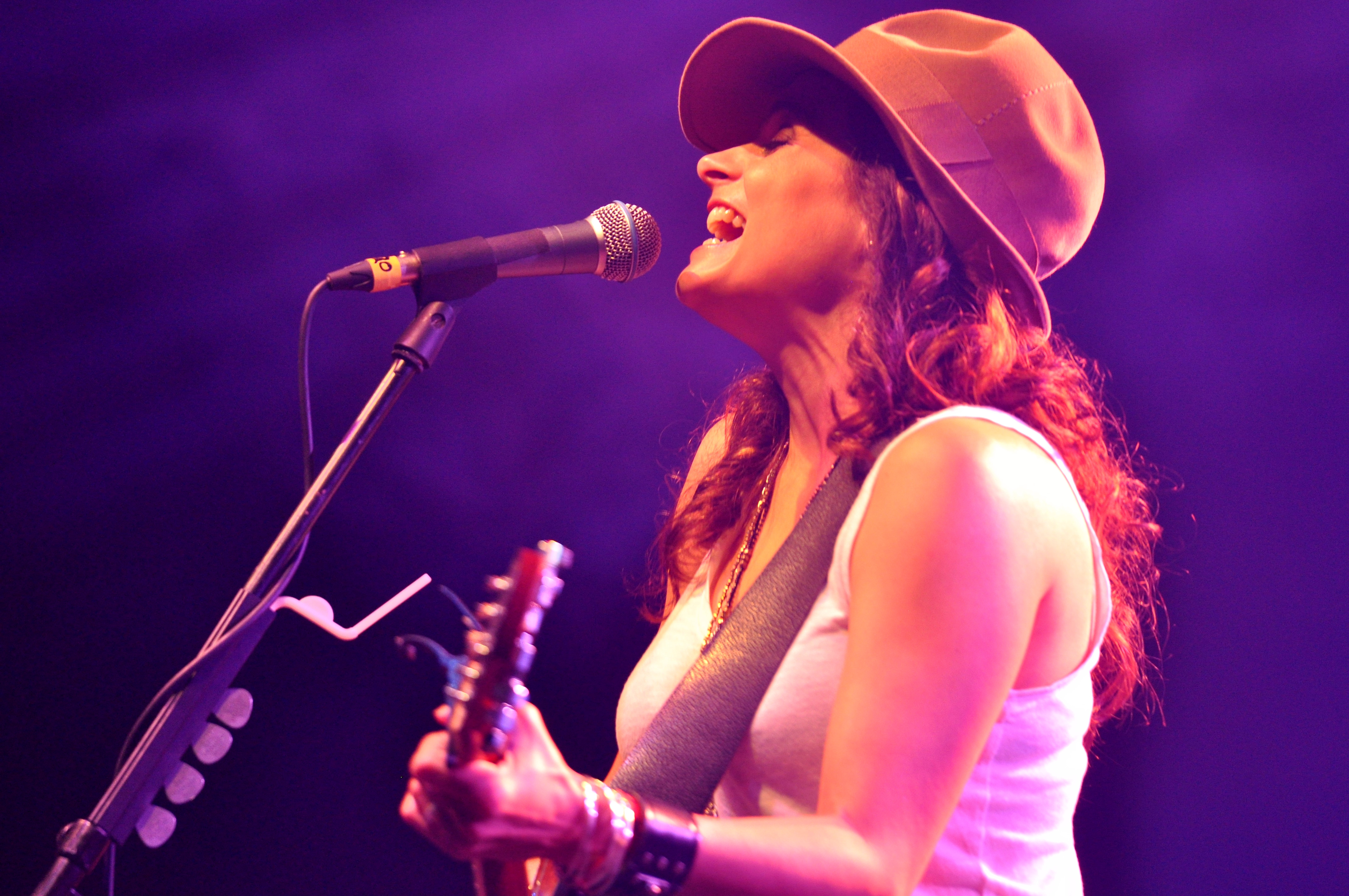
Nini Camps in 2016

== Discography ==
=== Albums ===
- She's Gone A Little Mad (1996)
- Snapshot (1998)
- New and Used (1999)
- Rock Album (2000)
- SaY iT! an-TIG-uh-nee (2002) (live)
- Antigone Rising's Traveling Circus (2003) (live)
- From the Ground Up (2005) (Hear Music)
- Tales from Wonderland (released as Sink or Swim - The Cassidy Project in 2009)
- Live From NYC (EP) (2010) (recorded live at The Bitter End in NYC, includes one studio track)
- This Christmas (2010) (download only single)
- 23 Red (Rising Shine Records) (August 2011)
- Whiskey & Wine, Vol. 1 (EP) (2014)
- Whiskey & Wine, Vol. 2 (EP) (2015)
- True Joy (2022)

=== Singles ===
- "Don't Look Back" (from From The Ground Up, May 11, 2005)
- "This Christmas" (2010)
- "Everywhere Is Home" (from 23 Red, August 5, 2011)
- "That Was The Whiskey" (from Whiskey & Wine, Vol. 1 EP, 2014)

=== Compilation ===
- "Fat Bottomed Girls", from the album Killer Queen: A Tribute to Queen (2005)

=== Videos ===
- Antigone Rising - "Don't Look Back"
- Antigone Rising - "No Remedy"
- Antigone Rising in Jerusalem and the West Bank
- Antigone Rising - "That Was The Whiskey"
