= Cherine =

Cherine is a female given name. Notable people with the name include:

- Chérine (born 1995), Belgian singer
- Cherine Abdellaoui (born 1998), Algerian Paralympic judoka
- Cherine Anderson (born 1984), Jamaican actress and vocalist
- Cherine Fahd (born 1974), Australian artist
- Cherine Alexander, Miss Continental 1984
