= Hilary McRae =

American pop singer-songwriter (born 1986)

- Born: July 23, 1986 (age 38); Boynton Beach, Florida, U.S.
- Genres: Pop, rock
- Occupation: Singer-songwriter

Hilary McRae (born July 23, 1986) is an American pop singer-songwriter. She was the first 'developing artist' to release an album on the Starbucks Cafe and Concord Music Group's label, Hear Music.

== Career ==
Hilary McRae, born in Boynton Beach, Florida, began writing songs at age 16. After attending Boston's Berklee School of Music she toured Central and South America as the keyboardist and backing vocalist for Latin musician Cristian Castro. She was discovered by producer Zach Ziskin, who produced and recorded her self penned debut album entitled "Through These Walls", which led to a deal with Starbucks' Hear Music label.

She became popular in late 2007 when 1.5 million digital downloads of her song "Consider Me Gone" were promoted as the "Song of the Day" at all U.S. Starbucks stores. "Through These Walls" was released April 15, 2008, on the Hear Music record label. The album attained Billboard top "Heatseeker" status for 4 consecutive weeks, peaking at No. 17. Her pop single, "Every Day (When Will You Be Mine)", was on the Billboard Adult Contemporary chart for eleven consecutive weeks, peaking at No. 22 for the week ending September 6, 2008. McRae, a Yamaha-endorsed artist, has opened for recording artists such as Fergie, Natasha Bedingfield, Teddy Geiger, Leon Russell, Huey Lewis, and Todd Rundgren, and completed her first nationwide tour in late 2008. She made her national television debut on the CBS Early Show which aired May 24, 2008.

== Discography ==
- Through These Walls (Hear Music, 2008)
