= Hear Music =

American record label

- Parent company: Concord Music Group and Starbucks
- Founded: 1990 (as catalog company); 2007 (as record label)
- Status: Defunct
- Distributor: Concord Music Group
- Genre: Rock, pop
- Country of origin: U.S.
- Official website: Official site

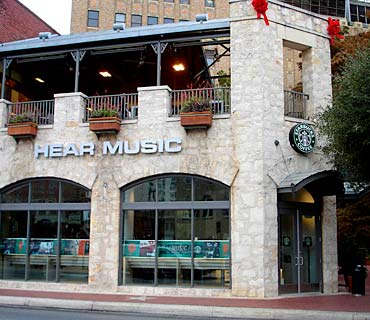
Starbucks' second Hear Music Coffeehouse at the South Bank development adjacent to the River Walk

Hear Music was a record label that was founded in 2007 in a partnership between Concord Music Group and Starbucks. Hear Music began as a catalog company in Cambridge, Massachusetts, in 1990 before being purchased by Starbucks in 1999.

== Concept ==
The Hear Music brand had four components: the music that each location played; in-store CD sales, including Starbucks exclusives; branded retail stores, which opened shortly after the catalog was formed, and a label which distributed their recordings.

As of December 2006, there were four Starbucks Hear Music Coffeehouses: Santa Monica, California, on the Third Street Promenade; San Antonio, Texas, on the River Walk; Miami, Florida, on the Lincoln Road shopping promenade; and Bellevue, Washington, in Bellevue Square. The original, now-defunct Hear Music Store was located in at 1809 Fourth St in Berkeley, California. Ten Starbucks locations also had Hear Music "media bars," a service which uses tablet PCs to allow customers to create their own mix CDs. The media bars were located in Seattle and in Austin, Texas. The music section in Canadian bookstore chain Chapters was at one time a licensed version of the Hear Music concept; however, the company no longer uses the brand name.

Their biggest seller was Ray Charles' Grammy-winning Genius Loves Company, with sales of 2.86 million records; 25% of those were sold at Starbucks locations.

In 2005, Starbucks announced a partnership with singer/songwriter Alanis Morissette. In a six-week deal, Morissette sold an acoustic version of Jagged Little Pill in Starbucks stores only. The acoustic version was released on June 13, 2005, to mark the album's tenth anniversary. This limited availability led to a dispute between Maverick Records and HMV Canada, who retaliated by removing Morissette's other albums from store shelves for the duration of Starbucks' exclusive sale.

In April 2008, Starbucks announced that it was refining its entertainment strategy and turning over the day-to-day management of Hear Music to Concord.

At the same time that Starbucks closed 600 coffeehouses in July 2008, it was announced that the Hear Music label would be shutting down. One of the four Hear Music stores, in Santa Monica, California, indicated that its music operation would be permanently closed approximately September 20, 2008. Another Hear Music store in Bellevue, Washington was converted to a regular Starbucks. The Lincoln Road Miami Beach location was downgraded as well, since November 2008.

== Creation as a record label ==
On March 12, 2007, Starbucks and Concord Music Group launched the Hear Music record label. The company's first artist signing was Paul McCartney, leaving his long-time label EMI on March 21, 2007.

In July 2007, the label signed Joni Mitchell and announced that her first album of new material in nearly ten years, Shine, would be released on September 25, 2007.

In March 2008, it was announced that Carly Simon had signed with the label and would be releasing a new album entitled This Kind of Love in late April 2008, her first collection of original songs since 2000's The Bedroom Tapes. She blamed poor sales on Hear Music's failure to promote the album. She sued the company and lost.

== Roster ==
- Anjulie
- Antigone Rising
- The Cars
- The Chieftains
- Elvis Costello
- James Hunter
- Carole King
- Paul McCartney
- John Mellencamp
- Hilary McRae
- Joni Mitchell
- Playing for Change
- Sia
- Paul Simon
- Carly Simon
- Sonic Youth
- James Taylor
