= Got Back =

2022–2025 concert tour by Paul McCartney

- World tour by Paul McCartney
- Official poster for the first North American leg
- Location: Europe; North America; Oceania; South America
- Start date: 28 April 2022
- End date: 25 November 2025
- Legs: 8
- No. of shows: 79
- Website: paulmccartneygotback.com

Paul McCartney concert chronology
- Freshen Up (2018–2019); Got Back (2022–2025)

Got Back was a concert tour by English musician Paul McCartney. The tour started on 28 April 2022 at the Spokane Arena in Spokane, Washington, and ended on 25 November 2025 at United Center in Chicago, Illinois. The tour was McCartney's first following the COVID-19 pandemic that resulted in the cancellation of a planned European leg of his Freshen Up tour in 2020, which included a planned performance at Glastonbury Festival. McCartney performed at Glastonbury on 25 June 2022, as a conclusion to the first leg of the Got Back tour.

The setlist for Got Back, as with McCartney's other concert tours as a solo artist, included songs by his former bands the Beatles and Wings, as well as songs from his solo career. In addition to McCartney, the tour band included Rusty Anderson on guitar, Brian Ray on guitar and bass, Paul "Wix" Wickens on keyboards, and Abe Laboriel Jr. on drums, along with the brass trio Hot City Horns. Originally planned for fourteen stops on the tour, a second date in both Oakland, California, and Boston were later added, for a total of sixteen concerts across the United States. On July 31, 2023, McCartney announced he would resume the Got Back tour, beginning with seven shows in Australia, followed by a Latin American leg. A second Latin American leg, with shows in cities where the tour had not previously visited, was announced in June 2024, followed by a second European leg. On June 20, 2024, McCartney announced two more concerts in Mexico. On July 10, 2025, McCartney announced a second North American leg of the tour beginning in September 2025 in Palm Springs, California.

== Background ==
Got Back was McCartney's first series of live shows since 2019. The COVID-19 pandemic resulted in the cancellation of the final European leg of his previous tour in 2020, which included a planned performance at Glastonbury Festival as the final show. During the pandemic in 2020, McCartney recorded and released his 18th solo album, McCartney III. In 2021, the three-part documentary series The Beatles: Get Back, directed and produced by Peter Jackson, was released on Disney+. The series covers the making of the album Let It Be by McCartney's former band the Beatles, utilizing footage and audio captured for a 1970 documentary film of the same name.

The dates for the Got Back tour were announced on 18 February 2022. The tour was originally planned to have fourteen stops. On 25 February 2022, it was announced that a second concert would be held at Fenway Park in Boston, Massachusetts, on 8 June, in addition to the already-announced concert on 7 June. On 11 March, it was then announced that the concert planned for 6 May at Oakland Arena in Oakland, California, would be followed by a second concert in the same venue on 8 May (Mother's Day), bringing the total number of planned stops on the tour to sixteen.

Following the conclusion of the North American leg of the tour, McCartney headlined at the Glastonbury Festival on 25 June 2022, in a 160-minute set, with special guests Dave Grohl and Bruce Springsteen.

== Overview ==
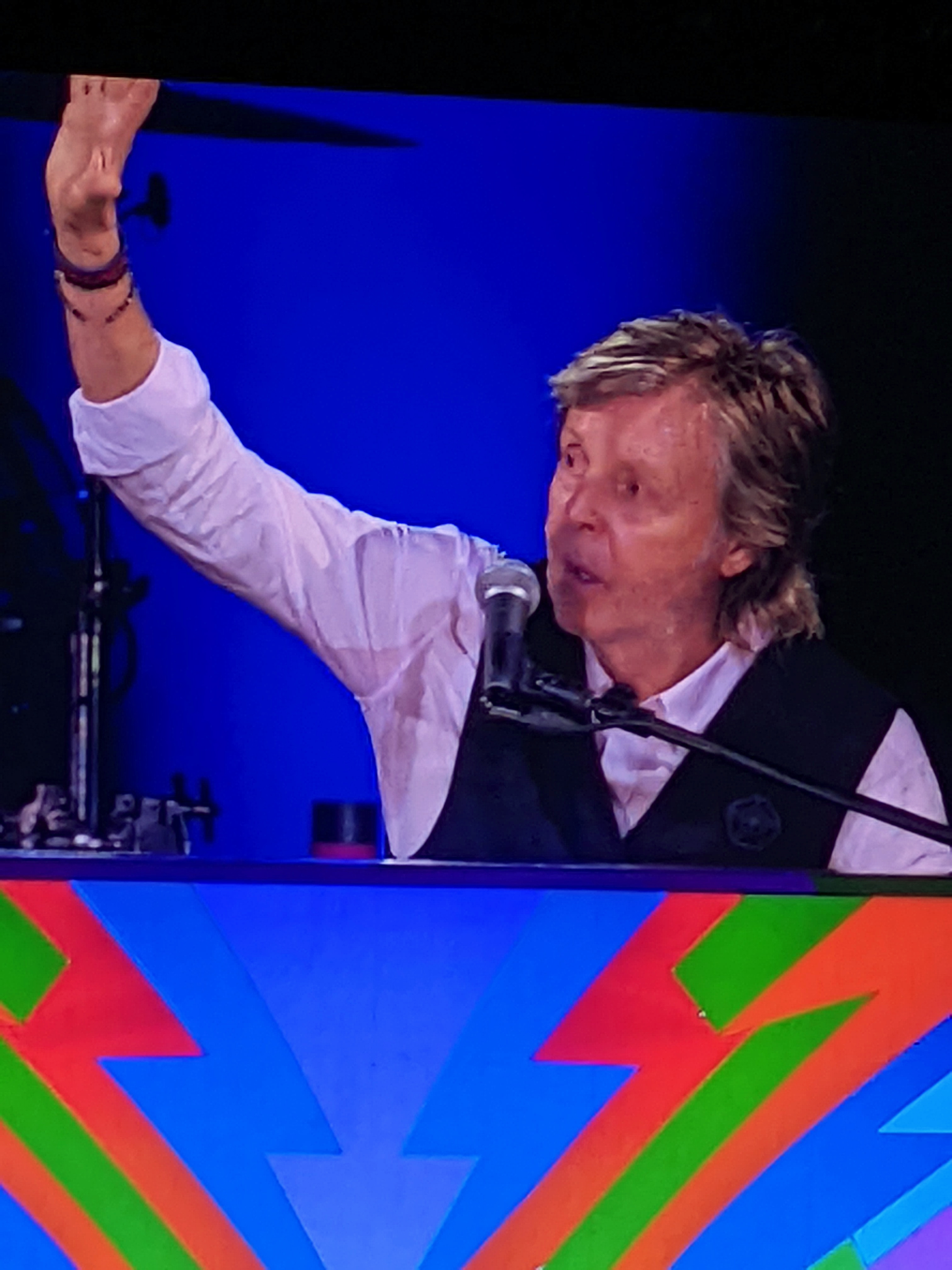
McCartney at his upright piano at Camping World Stadium in Orlando, Florida

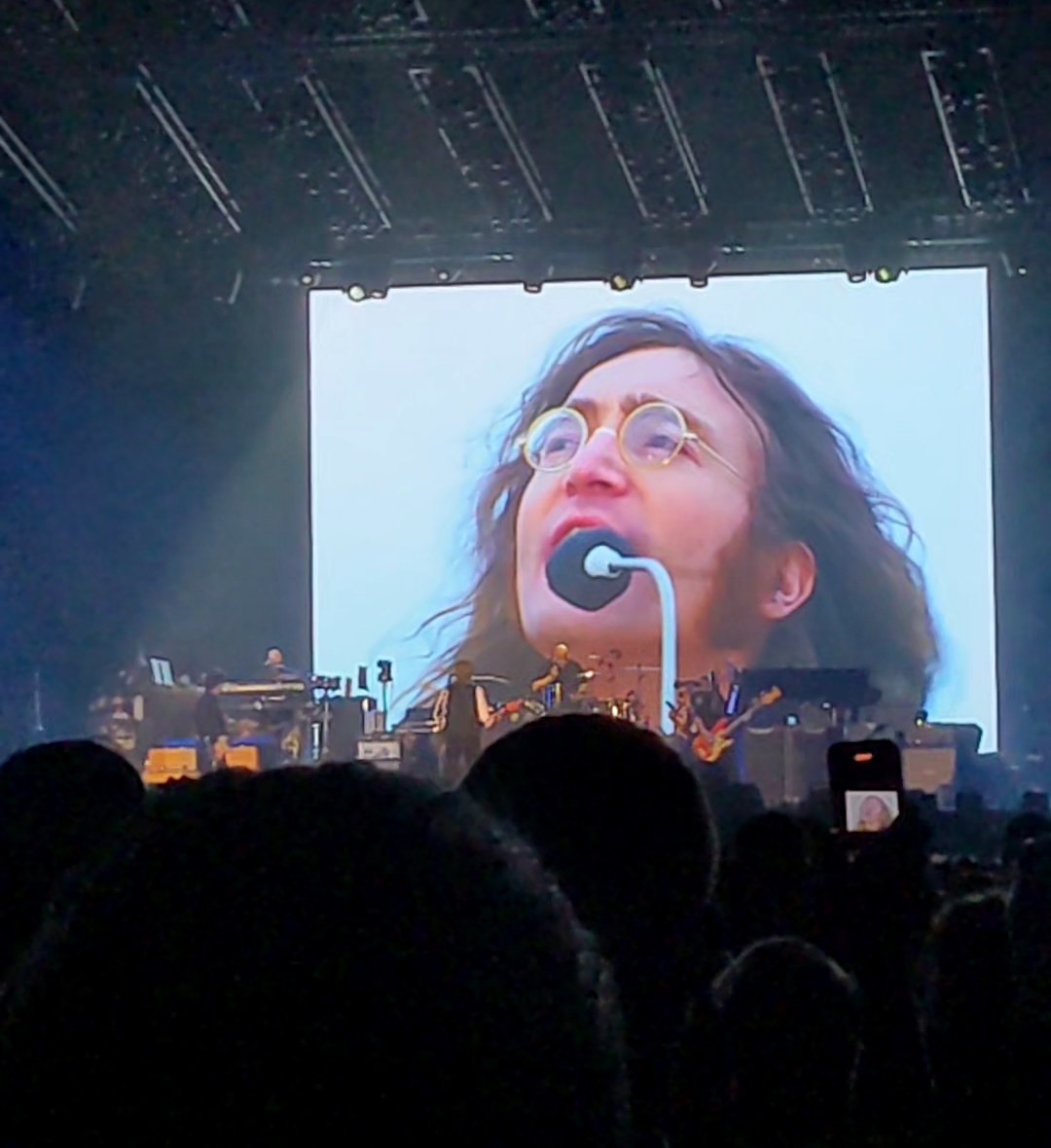
McCartney performing "I've Got a Feeling" as a "video duet" with footage of John Lennon

The setlist for the Got Back tour consisted of over 30 songs, including songs by the Beatles and Wings, as well as songs from McCartney's solo career. Each concert ran for around 2 hours and 40 minutes. The pre-show featured a scrolling video slide show of images of McCartney and the Beatles, culminating in an animated image of McCartney's Höfner bass.

The sixth song on the setlist was Wings' "Let Me Roll It", which segued into a snippet of "Foxy Lady" as a tribute to Jimi Hendrix. The ninth song on the setlist was "My Valentine", a song from McCartney's solo career, accompanied by a video of Natalie Portman and Johnny Depp gesturing in sign language. The 16th song on the setlist, the Beatles' "Blackbird", featured McCartney singing while playing acoustic guitar, elevated about six metres (20 feet) in the air, in front of a large LED display. "Blackbird" was followed by another acoustic performance, "Here Today", a song which McCartney wrote about his former Beatles bandmate John Lennon after Lennon's murder in 1980. The 22nd song on the setlist, the George Harrison-penned "Something", began with McCartney playing a ukulele which Harrison gave to him. The 28th song on the setlist, Wings' "Live and Let Die", involves the use of pyrotechnics, including flames and fireworks.

The Spokesman-Review and The Dallas Morning News noted the absence of the Beatles song "Back in the U.S.S.R.", a usual staple of McCartney's live concerts, from the setlist, in light of the 2022 Russian invasion of Ukraine. Immediately preceding the encore at each stop on the tour, McCartney and his fellow band members left the stage and each returned with a flag: the flag of the United Kingdom, the flag of the country they were performing in, an LGBT pride flag, and, in 2022, the flag of Ukraine, as well as the state flag of whichever US state the concert took place in (for example, the flag of Texas at the show in Fort Worth, Texas, and the flag of Florida at the show in Hollywood, Florida).

The encore of the show was composed of the Beatles songs "I've Got a Feeling", "Birthday" / “Sgt. Pepper’s Lonely Hearts Club Band (Reprise)", Helter Skelter", and "Golden Slumbers" / "Carry That Weight" / "The End". "I've Got a Feeling" was originally written and sung by McCartney and John Lennon and included on the Let It Be album. The performances of this song during the tour included a "video duet" between McCartney and Lennon, using footage restored for the Get Back documentary of Lennon performing the song with the Beatles during their 1969 rooftop concert. Jackson had isolated the vocals of Lennon after conceiving the idea of having Lennon "sing" along with McCartney and his live band; he told McCartney, "We can extract John's voice, and he can sing with you," to which McCartney replied, "Oh, yeah!"

On the final stop of the North American leg of the tour, on 16 June 2022 at MetLife Stadium in East Rutherford, New Jersey, McCartney was joined on stage during the concert by New Jersey-born musicians Bruce Springsteen and Jon Bon Jovi. Springsteen, with McCartney and McCartney's band, performed the Springsteen song "Glory Days", as well as the Beatles' "I Wanna Be Your Man". During the show's encore, Bon Jovi appeared on stage with balloons and sang "Happy Birthday" to McCartney, who turned 80 years old two days later on 18 June. Springsteen returned during the final song, "The End", playing guitar.

During the 2024 leg in Latin America, McCartney debuted "Now and Then" which was accompanied by clips of the song's music video.

McCartney also held meet and greet events for competition-winning fans for the first time since COVID. When interviewed about the encounters before his Buenos Aires shows in Argentina, he said "It’s great because they are always super pleased to see me, and they each have an interesting story. For example, one guy today told me he just got married, and another fan mentioned she is getting married to someone she met at my show soon which is so lovely to hear."

== Reception ==
Reviewing the 13 May concert held at Inglewood, California's SoFi Stadium, Chris Willman of Variety commended McCartney's singing voice and made note of the show's structure: "a rocking opening stretch highly reliant on '70s rockers [...] a partially acoustic, 'Storytellers'-like magical history tour of the Beatles' rise as the backbone of Act 2, [...] and then, letting the third hour be birthday songs, na-na-na-na-na-na-na-ing and Abbey Road medley-izing. That structure indisputably works, and so, as part of a winning formula, does a band that has now been together for many more years than the Beatles ever were".

The Charlotte Observer's Théoden Janes, reviewing the 21 May concert at Truist Field at Wake Forest in Winston-Salem, North Carolina, praised the show, calling the setlist "thoughtfully curated" and writing that "the entire night was one big nonstop highlight". However, Janes suggested that the production "skip the music video that plays during 'My Valentine,'" stating, "We want to think about someone we love during that song. Not about Depp and Amber Heard"; they also criticized the heavy traffic around the stadium and the management of it by stadium officials and local police.

Grant Albert of the Miami New Times, in a review of the 25 May concert held at Hollywood, Florida's Hard Rock Live, wrote that McCartney "can't hit the high notes like he used to. Still, his 60-plus year discography, showmanship, and influence didn't stop the nearly 7,000 attendees from enjoying the rock polymath perform"; he added, "McCartney injected loads of humor, visuals, lasers, and a genuine intention to put on a good show".

Reviewing the 7 June concert at Fenway Park in Boston, Marc Hirsh of the Boston Globe noted "some small noticeable vulnerabilities from age" in McCartney's singing voice, "But it otherwise maintained its essential McCartneyness". Hirsh also wrote, "Eleven days shy of turning 80, he was spry and up for the endurance challenge of playing upward of 30 songs over the course of two hours and 40 minutes at the first of two sold-out shows."

== Personnel ==
Rusty Anderson (Backing vocals, electric guitar, acoustic guitar)	Paul McCartney (Lead vocals, bass, acoustic guitar, piano, electric guitar, ukulele, mandolin)	Brian Ray (Backing vocals, electric guitar, acoustic guitar, bass, electric sitar)
Paul "Wix" Wickens (Backing vocals, keyboards, electric guitar, acoustic guitar, bongos, percussion, harmonica, accordion)	Paul McCartney (Lead vocals, bass, acoustic guitar, piano, electric guitar, ukulele, mandolin)	Abe Laboriel Jr. (Backing vocals, drums, percussion)

=== Additional musicians ===
Hot City Horns

- Mike Davis – trumpet
- Kenji Fenton – saxophone
- Paul Burton – trombone

== Set lists ==
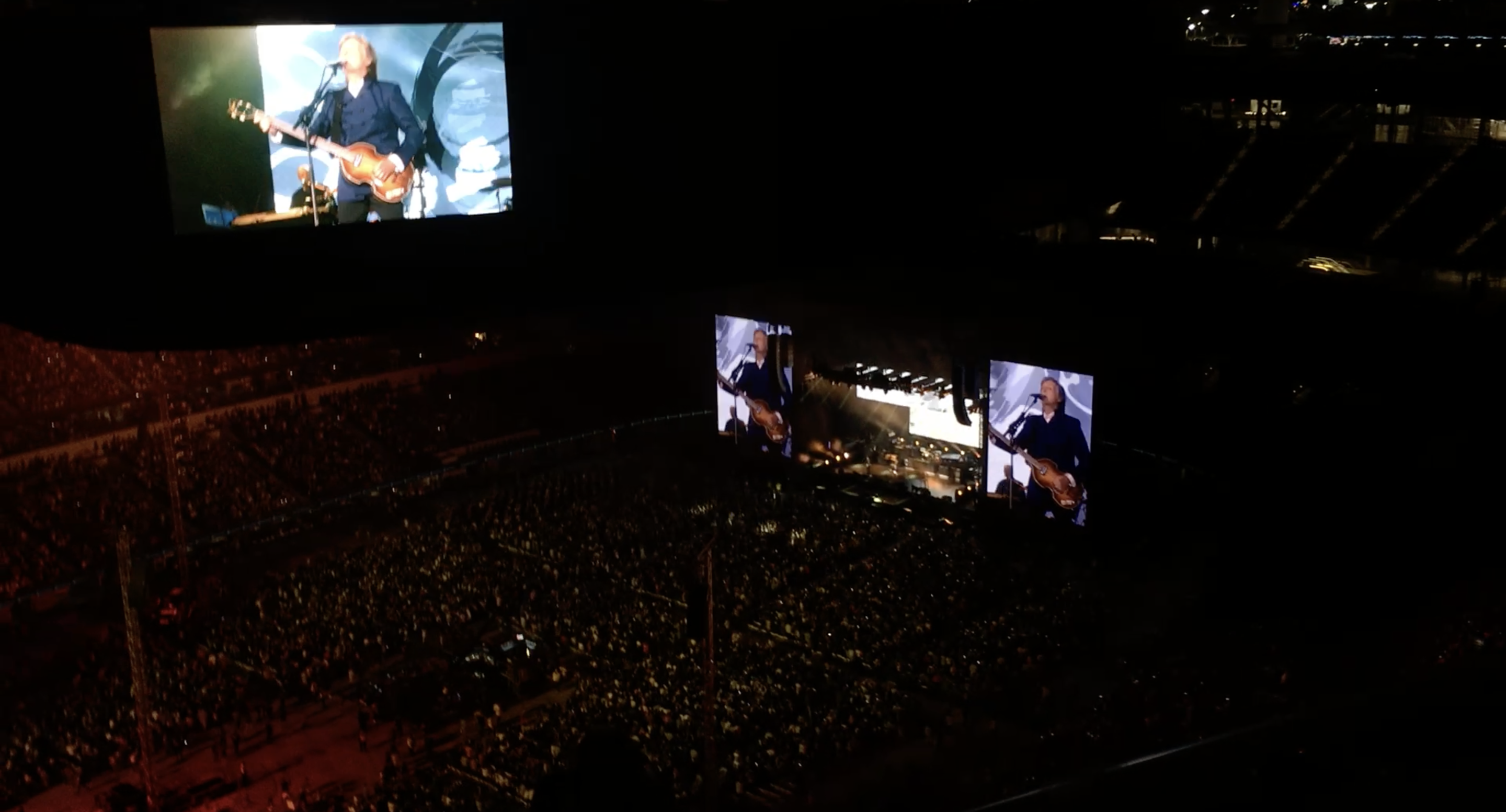
McCartney performing at SoFi Stadium in Inglewood, California

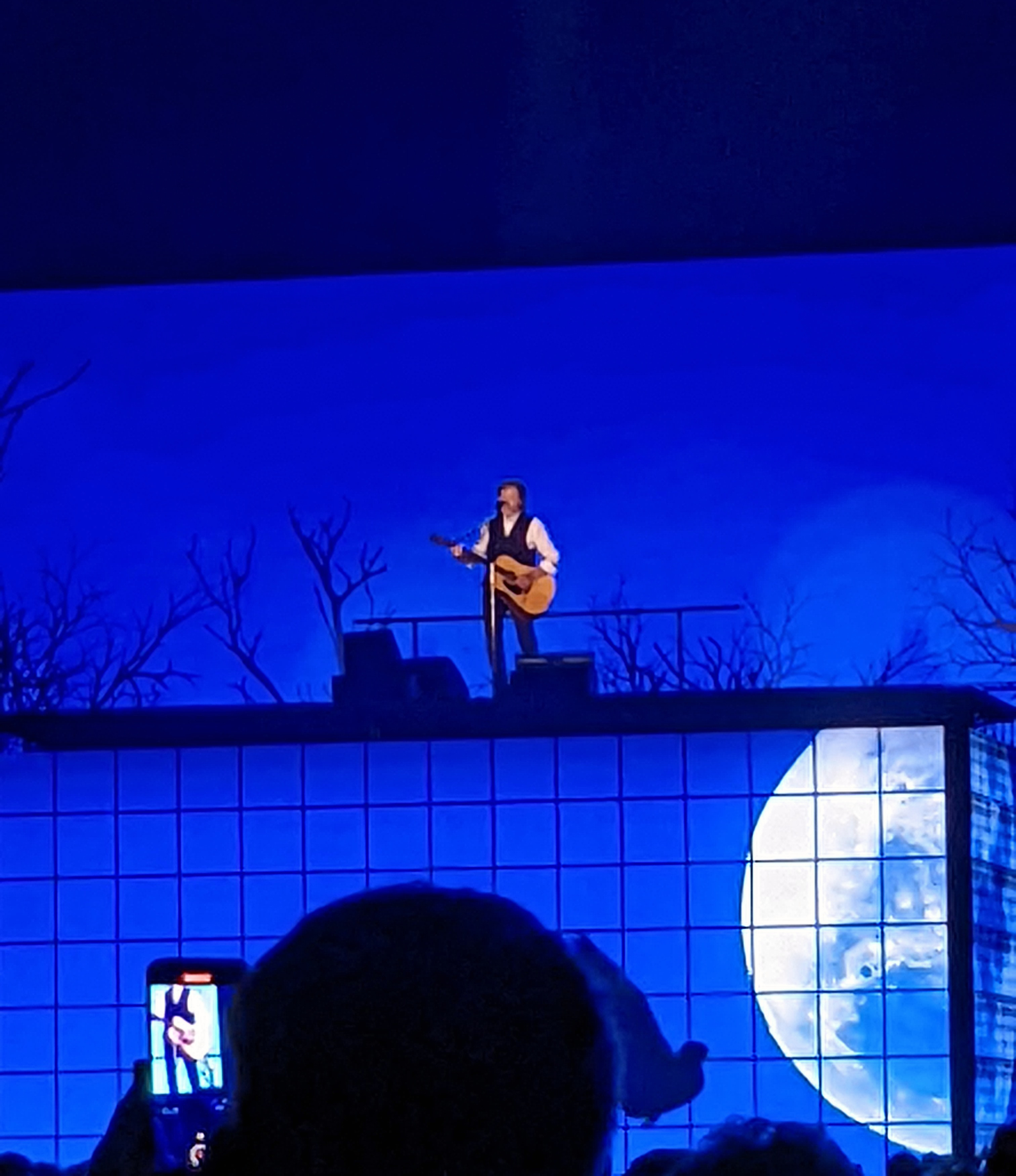
McCartney performing "Blackbird" at Camping World Stadium in Orlando, Florida

=== 2022 ===
1. "Can't Buy Me Love"
2. "Junior's Farm"
3. "Letting Go"
4. "Got to Get You into My Life"
5. "Come On to Me"
6. "Let Me Roll It" (with "Foxy Lady" coda)
7. "Getting Better"
8. "Let 'Em In" or "Women and Wives"
9. "My Valentine"
10. "Nineteen Hundred and Eighty-Five"
11. "Maybe I'm Amazed"
12. "I've Just Seen a Face" or "We Can Work It Out"
13. "In Spite of All the Danger"
14. "Love Me Do"
15. "Dance Tonight"
16. "Blackbird"
17. "Here Today"
18. "New" or "Queenie Eye"
19. "Lady Madonna"
20. "Fuh You"
21. "Jet" (added from 8 June)
22. "Being for the Benefit of Mr. Kite!"
23. "Something"
24. "Ob-La-Di, Ob-La-Da"
25. "You Never Give Me Your Money"
26. "She Came In Through the Bathroom Window"
27. "Get Back"
28. "Band on the Run"
29. "Let It Be"
30. "Live and Let Die"
31. "Hey Jude"

Encore

32. "I've Got a Feeling" (virtual duet with John Lennon)
33. "Birthday"
34. "Helter Skelter"
35. "Golden Slumbers"
36. "Carry That Weight"
37. "The End"

=== 2023 ===
1. "Can't Buy Me Love" or "A Hard Day's Night"
2. "Junior's Farm"
3. "Letting Go"
4. "She's A Woman" or "Drive My Car"
5. "Got to Get You into My Life"
6. "Come On to Me" or "Coming Up"
7. "Let Me Roll It" (with "Foxy Lady" coda)
8. "Getting Better"
9. "Let 'Em In"
10. "My Valentine"
11. "Nineteen Hundred and Eighty-Five"
12. "Maybe I'm Amazed"
13. "I've Just Seen a Face"
14. "In Spite of All the Danger"
15. "Love Me Do"
16. "Dance Tonight"
17. "Blackbird"
18. "Here Today"
19. "New" or "Queenie Eye"
20. "Lady Madonna"
21. "Fuh You" (Removed from 4 December)
22. "You Never Give Me Your Money" (Removed from 4 December)
23. "She Came In Through the Bathroom Window" (Removed from 4 December)
24. "Jet"
25. "Being for the Benefit of Mr. Kite!"
26. "Something"
27. "Ob-La-Di, Ob-La-Da"
28. "Band on the Run"
29. "Get Back"
30. "Let It Be"
31. "Live and Let Die"
32. "Hey Jude"

Encore

33. "I've Got a Feeling" (virtual duet with John Lennon)
34. "Birthday" or "I Saw Her Standing There" or "Day Tripper"
35. "Sgt. Pepper's Lonely Hearts Club Band (Reprise)"
36. "Helter Skelter"
37. "Golden Slumbers"
38. "Carry That Weight"
39. "The End"

=== 2024 ===
1. "Can't Buy Me Love" or "A Hard Day's Night"
2. "Junior's Farm"
3. "Letting Go"
4. "She's A Woman" or "Drive My Car" or "All My Loving"
5. "Got to Get You into My Life"
6. "Come On to Me"
7. "Let Me Roll It" (with "Foxy Lady" coda)
8. "Getting Better"
9. "Let 'Em In"
10. "My Valentine"
11. "Nineteen Hundred and Eighty-Five"
12. "Maybe I'm Amazed"
13. "I've Just Seen a Face"
14. "In Spite of All the Danger"
15. "Love Me Do"
16. "Michelle" (only in Paris)
17. "Dance Tonight"
18. "Blackbird"
19. "Here Today"
20. "Now and Then"
21. "New"
22. "Lady Madonna"
23. "Jet"
24. "Being for the Benefit of Mr. Kite!"
25. "Something"
26. "Ob-La-Di, Ob-La-Da"
27. "Band on the Run"
28. "Wonderful Christmastime" (only in Manchester and London)
29. "Get Back"
30. "Let It Be"
31. "Live and Let Die"
32. "Hey Jude"

Encore

31. "I've Got a Feeling" (virtual duet with John Lennon)
32. "Birthday" or "Hi, Hi, Hi" or "I Saw Her Standing There" or "Day Tripper"
33. "Sgt. Pepper's Lonely Hearts Club Band (Reprise)"
34. "Helter Skelter"
35. "Golden Slumbers"
36. "Carry That Weight"
37. "The End"

=== 2025 ===
1. "Help!"
2. "Coming Up"
3. "Got to Get You into My Life"
4. "Drive My Car"
5. "Letting Go"
6. "Come On to Me"
7. "Let Me Roll It" (with "Foxy Lady" coda)
8. "Getting Better"
9. "Let 'Em In"
10. "My Valentine"
11. "Nineteen Hundred and Eighty-Five"
12. "Maybe I'm Amazed"
13. "I've Just Seen a Face"
14. "Michelle" (only in Montreal)
15. "In Spite of All the Danger"
16. "Love Me Do"
17. "Dance Tonight"
18. "Blackbird"
19. "Here Today"
20. "Now and Then"
21. "Lady Madonna"
22. "Jet"
23. "Being for the Benefit of Mr. Kite!"
24. "Something"
25. "Ob-La-Di, Ob-La-Da"
26. "Band on the Run"
27. "Get Back"
28. "Let It Be"
29. "Live and Let Die"
30. "Hey Jude"

Encore

30. "I've Got a Feeling" (virtual duet with John Lennon)
31. "Mull of Kintyre" (only in Hamilton)
32. "Sgt. Pepper's Lonely Hearts Club Band (Reprise)"
33. "Helter Skelter"
34. "Golden Slumbers"
35. "Carry That Weight"
36. "The End"

== Tour dates ==
List of 2022 concerts
Date	City	Country	Venue	Attendance	Revenue
28 April	Spokane	United States	Spokane Arena	10,760 / 10,760	$3,438,893
2 May	Seattle	United States	Climate Pledge Arena	30,324 / 30,324	$7,983,322
3 May	Seattle	United States	Climate Pledge Arena	30,324 / 30,324	$7,983,322
6 May	Oakland	United States	Oakland Arena	28,599 / 28,599	$7,580,903
8 May	Oakland	United States	Oakland Arena	28,599 / 28,599	$7,580,903
13 May	Inglewood (Note: Labelled as Los Angeles in promotional material.)	United States	SoFi Stadium	43,658 / 43,658	$12,046,695
17 May	Fort Worth	United States	Dickies Arena	12,093 / 12,093	$3,985,850
21 May	Winston-Salem	United States	Truist Field at Wake Forest	33,222 / 33,222	$7,256,101
25 May	Hollywood	United States	Hard Rock Live	6,720 / 6,720	$3,347,447
28 May	Orlando	United States	Camping World Stadium	42,662 / 42,662	$8,848,665
31 May	Knoxville	United States	Thompson–Boling Arena	16,037 / 16,037	$4,651,316
4 June	Syracuse	United States	JMA Wireless Dome	35,599 / 35,599	$7,815,181
7 June	Boston	United States	Fenway Park	71,380 / 71,380	$15,305,355
8 June	Boston	United States	Fenway Park	71,380 / 71,380	$15,305,355
12 June	Baltimore	United States	Oriole Park at Camden Yards	40,733 / 40,733	$9,806,025
16 June	East Rutherford	United States	MetLife Stadium	51,872 / 51,872	$13,012,034
24 June (Note: The concert on 24 June 2022 in Frome, part of the Frome Festival, was a secret warm-up show for the performance at the Glastonbury Festival.)	Frome	England	Cheese and Grain	—	—
25 June (Note: The concert on 25 June 2022 in Pilton was part of the Glastonbury Festival.)	Pilton	England	Worthy Farm	—	—

List of 2023 concerts
Date	City	Country	Venue	Attendance	Revenue
18 October	Adelaide	Australia	Adelaide Entertainment Centre	8,490 / 8,490	$1,801,112
21 October	Melbourne	Australia	Marvel Stadium	52,152 / 52,152	$8,945,988
24 October	Newcastle	Australia	McDonald Jones Stadium	25,631 / 25,631	$4,287,589
27 October	Sydney	Australia	Allianz Stadium	69,402 / 69,402	$11,770,049
28 October	Sydney	Australia	Allianz Stadium	69,402 / 69,402	$11,770,049
1 November	Brisbane	Australia	Suncorp Stadium	38,688 / 38,688	$6,215,622
4 November	Gold Coast	Australia	Heritage Bank Stadium	26,108 / 26,108	$4,039,435
14 November	Mexico City	Mexico	Foro Sol	118,088 / 118,088	$16,429,326
16 November	Mexico City	Mexico	Foro Sol	118,088 / 118,088	$16,429,326
28 November (Note: The concert on 28 November 2023 in Brasília was a secret warm-up show for the performance at the Arena BRB Mané Garrincha. The show, limited to 300 assistants, was announced the same morning.)	Brasília	Brazil	Clube do Choro de Brasília	—	—
30 November	Brasília	Brazil	Arena BRB Mané Garrincha	53,578 / 53,578	$4,225,330
3 December	Belo Horizonte	Brazil	Arena MRV	81,001 / 81,001	$5,955,622
4 December	Belo Horizonte	Brazil	Arena MRV	81,001 / 81,001	$5,955,622
7 December	São Paulo	Brazil	Allianz Parque	149,226 / 149,226	$16,233,151
9 December	São Paulo	Brazil	Allianz Parque	149,226 / 149,226	$16,233,151
10 December	São Paulo	Brazil	Allianz Parque	149,226 / 149,226	$16,233,151
13 December	Curitiba	Brazil	Estádio Couto Pereira	43,633 / 43,633	$4,301,288
16 December	Rio de Janeiro	Brazil	Maracanã Stadium	62,305 / 62,305	$5,360,278

List of 2024 concerts
Date	City	Country	Venue	Attendance	Revenue
1 October	Montevideo	Uruguay	Estadio Centenario	—	—
5 October	Buenos Aires	Argentina	River Plate Stadium	—	—
6 October	Buenos Aires	Argentina	River Plate Stadium	—	—
11 October	Santiago	Chile	Estadio Monumental	—	—
15 October	São Paulo	Brazil	Allianz Parque	—	—
16 October	São Paulo	Brazil	Allianz Parque	—	—
19 October	Florianópolis	Brazil	Estádio da Ressacada	—	—
23 October	Córdoba	Argentina	Estadio Mario Alberto Kempes	—	—
27 October	Lima	Peru	Estadio Nacional	—	—
1 November	Bogotá	Colombia	Estadio El Campín	—	—
5 November	San José	Costa Rica	Estadio Nacional	—	—
8 November	Guadalupe (Note: Labelled as Monterrey in promotional material.)	Mexico	Estadio BBVA	—	—
12 November	Mexico City	Mexico	Estadio GNP Seguros	—	—
14 November	Mexico City	Mexico	Estadio GNP Seguros	—	—
17 November (Note: The concert on 17 November 2024 in Mexico City is part of the Corona Capital music festival.)	Mexico City	Mexico	Autódromo Hermanos Rodríguez	—	—
4 December	Paris	France	La Défense Arena	—	—
5 December	Paris	France	La Défense Arena	—	—
9 December	Madrid	Spain	WiZink Center	—	—
10 December	Madrid	Spain	WiZink Center	—	—
14 December	Manchester	England	Co-op Live	—	—
15 December	Manchester	England	Co-op Live	—	—
18 December	London	England	The O_{2} Arena	—	—
19 December	London	England	The O_{2} Arena	—	—

List of 2025 concerts
Date	City	Country	Venue	Attendance	Revenue
29 September	Palm Desert	United States	Acrisure Arena	—	—
4 October	Paradise	United States	Allegiant Stadium	—	—
7 October	Albuquerque	United States	Isleta Amphitheater	—	—
11 October	Denver	United States	Coors Field	—	—
14 October	Des Moines	United States	Casey’s Center	—	—
17 October	Minneapolis	United States	U.S. Bank Stadium	—	—
22 October	Tulsa	United States	BOK Center	—	—
25 October	San Antonio	United States	Alamodome	—	—
29 October	New Orleans	United States	Smoothie King Center	—	—
2 November	Atlanta	United States	State Farm Arena	—	—
3 November	Atlanta	United States	State Farm Arena	—	—
6 November	Nashville	United States	The Pinnacle	—	—
8 November	Columbus	United States	Nationwide Arena	—	—
11 November	Pittsburgh	United States	PPG Paints Arena	—	—
14 November	Buffalo	United States	KeyBank Center	—	—
17 November	Montréal	Canada	Bell Centre	—	—
18 November	Montréal	Canada	Bell Centre	—	—
21 November	Hamilton	Canada	TD Coliseum	—	—
24 November	Chicago	United States	United Center	—	—
25 November	Chicago	United States	United Center	—	—
Total				1,151,961 / 1,151,961	$194,642,577

== Image gallery ==
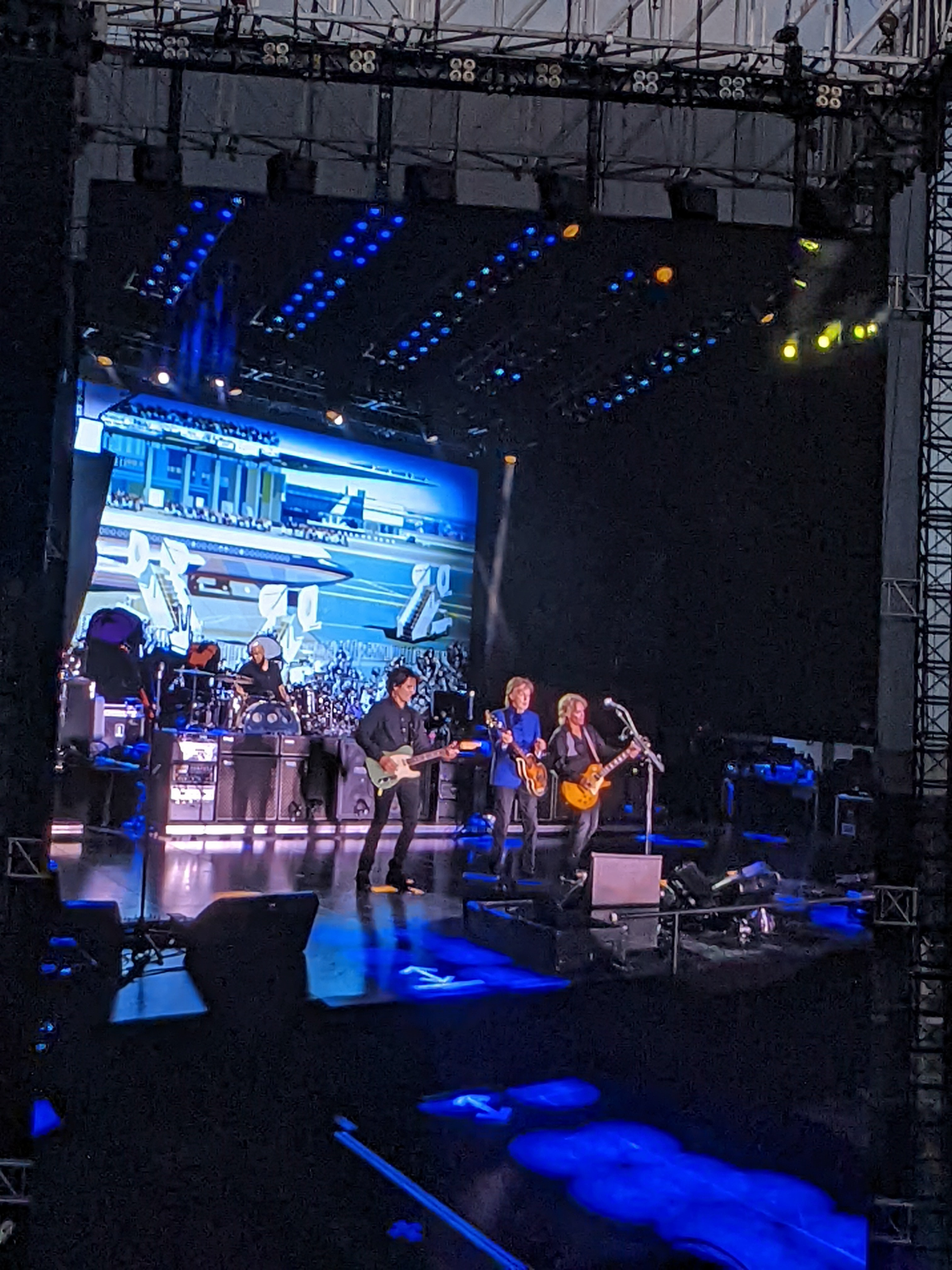
McCartney, Laboriel Jr., Anderson, and Ray performing at Camping World Stadium in Orlando, Florida

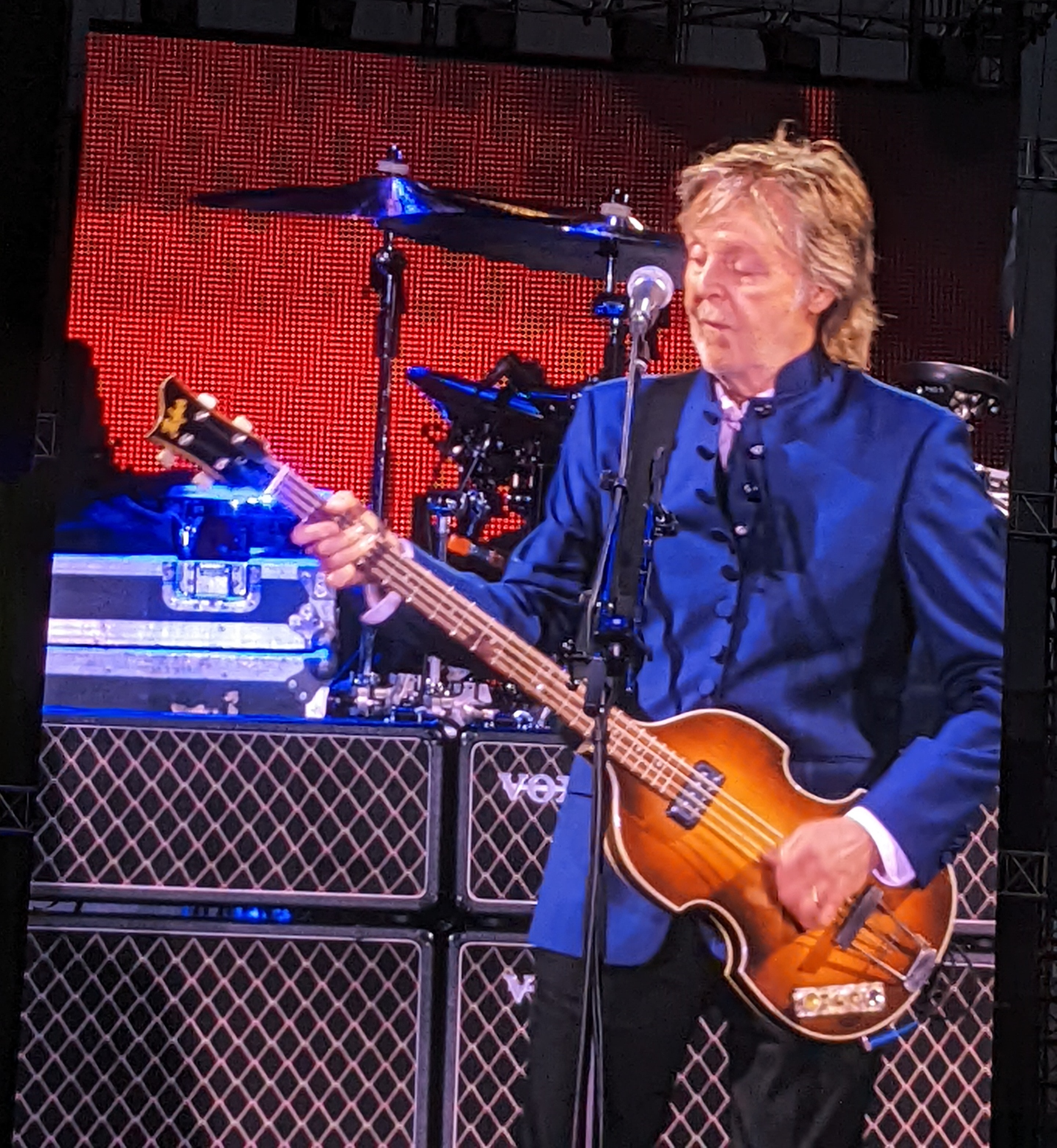
McCartney playing bass at Camping World Stadium

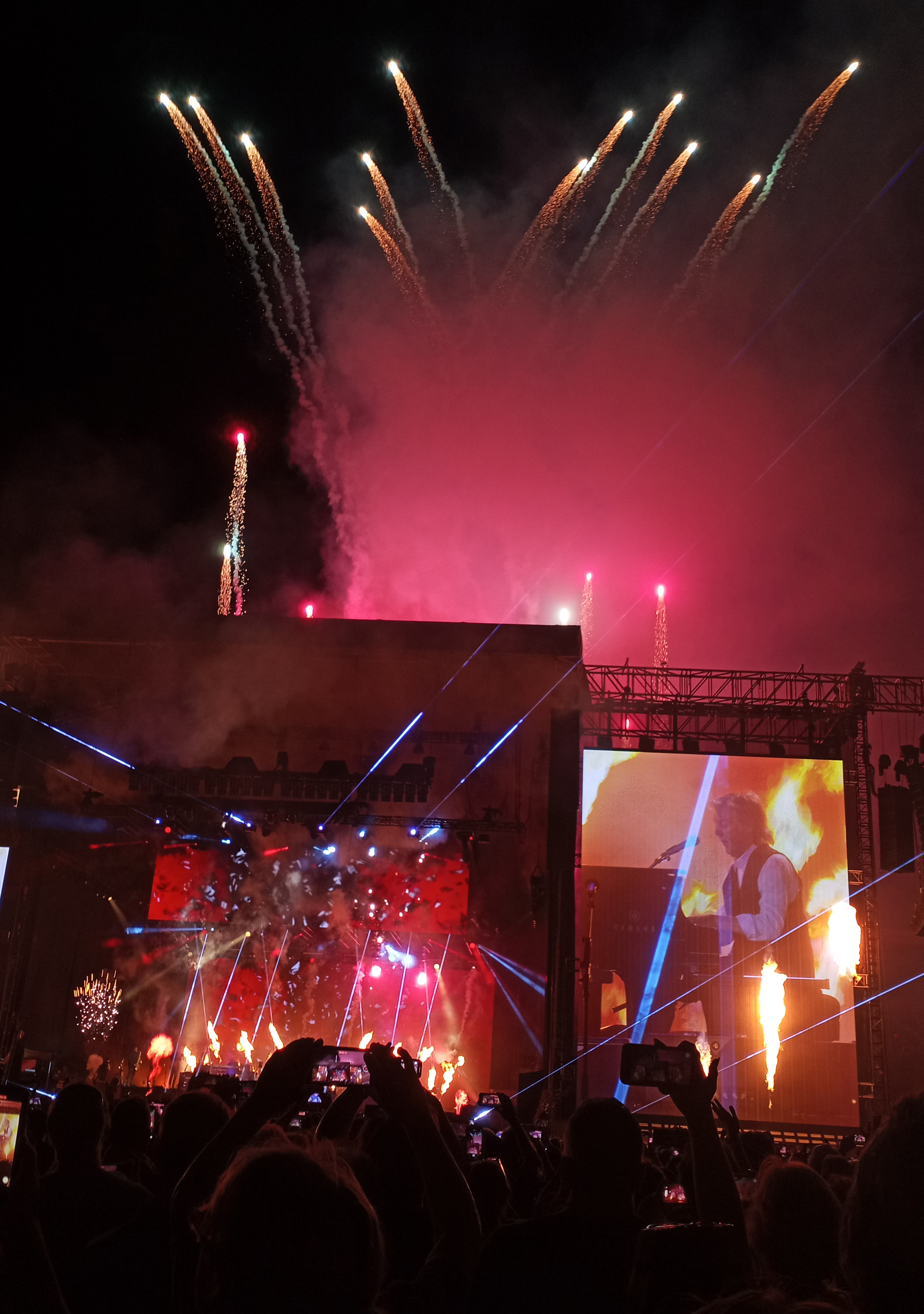
McCartney performing "Live and Let Die" at Camping World Stadium

== See also ==
- List of Paul McCartney concert tours
- List of Billboard Boxscore number-one concert series of the 2020s
