= Freshen Up (tour) =

2018–2019 concert tour by Paul McCartney

- Transcontinental tour by Paul McCartney
- Location: Asia; Europe; North America; South America
- Associated album: Egypt Station
- Start date: 17 September 2018
- End date: 13 July 2019
- Legs: 6
- No. of shows: 39

Paul McCartney concert chronology
- 2018 Secret Gigs (2018); Freshen Up (2018–2019); Got Back (2022–2025)

Freshen Up was a concert tour by English musician Paul McCartney that commenced on 17 September 2018 with a four-concert leg in Canada. The tour was McCartney's first tour after the release of his album Egypt Station, which was released on 7 September. As with McCartney's other concert tours as a solo artist, the setlist for the Freshen Up tour was composed of songs by his former bands the Beatles and Wings, as well as songs from his solo career.

Prior to the announcement of the tour, McCartney revealed he would headline the 17th Austin City Limits Music Festival at Zilker Park, in October 2018. In November 2019, the tour was extended into the following year, to include McCartney's first concerts in Italy since his Out There tour. In the end, the tour was performed across venues in North America, Japan, Europe, and South America. A headlining appearance at the 2020 Glastonbury Festival was to be the final concert of the tour; however, it was cancelled due to the COVID-19 pandemic, which later led to the cancelation of all the concerts scheduled for 2020.

== Personnel ==
Rusty Anderson (Backing vocals, electric guitar, acoustic guitar)	Paul McCartney (Lead vocals, bass, acoustic guitar, piano, electric guitar, ukulele, mandolin)	Brian Ray (Backing vocals, electric guitar, acoustic guitar, bass)
Paul Wickens (Backing vocals, keyboards, electric guitar, acoustic guitar, bongos, percussion, harmonica, accordion)	Paul McCartney (Lead vocals, bass, acoustic guitar, piano, electric guitar, ukulele, mandolin)	Abe Laboriel, Jr. (Backing vocals, drums, percussion)

== Tour dates ==
List of 2018 concerts
Date	City	Country	Venue	Attendance	Revenue
17 September	Quebec City	Canada	Videotron Centre	14,935 / 14,935	$2,260,730
20 September	Montreal	Canada	Bell Centre	16,135 / 16,135	$2,403,773
28 September	Winnipeg	Canada	Bell MTS Place	12,610 / 12,610	$1,881,926
30 September	Edmonton	Canada	Rogers Place	15,310 / 15,310	$2,531,810
5 October (Note: The concerts on 5 October 2018 and 12 October 2018 in Austin were part of the Austin City Limits Music Festival.)	Austin	United States	Zilker Park	—N/a	—N/a
12 October	Austin	United States	Zilker Park	—N/a	—N/a
31 October	Tokyo	Japan	Tokyo Dome	—N/a	—N/a
1 November	Tokyo	Japan	Tokyo Dome	—N/a	—N/a
5 November	Tokyo	Japan	Ryōgoku Kokugikan	—N/a	—N/a
8 November	Nagoya	Japan	Nagoya Dome	—N/a	—N/a
28 November	Paris	France	Paris La Défense Arena	36,663 / 36,663	$3,851,577
30 November	Copenhagen	Denmark	Royal Arena	15,143 / 15,143	$3,275,200
3 December	Kraków	Poland	Tauron Arena Kraków	17,497 / 17,497	$1,948,007
5 December	Vienna	Austria	Wiener Stadthalle	21,134 / 21,134	$3,643,559
6 December	Vienna	Austria	Wiener Stadthalle	21,134 / 21,134	$3,643,559
12 December	Liverpool	England	Echo Arena Liverpool	9,032 / 9,032	$1,382,519
14 December	Glasgow	Scotland	SSE Hydro	10,737 / 10,737	$1,501,001
16 December	London	England	The O_{2} Arena	15,651 / 15,651	$2,110,660

List of 2019 concerts
Date	City	Country	Venue	Attendance	Revenue
20 March	Santiago	Chile	Estadio Nacional Julio Martínez Prádanos	49,900 / 49,900	$4,214,200
23 March	Buenos Aires	Argentina	Campo Argentino de Polo	61,940 / 61,940	$5,404,680
26 March	São Paulo	Brazil	Allianz Parque	90,384 / 90,384	$8,733,620
27 March	São Paulo	Brazil	Allianz Parque	90,384 / 90,384	$8,733,620
30 March	Curitiba	Brazil	Estádio Couto Pereira	41,609 / 41,609	$3,650,750
23 May	New Orleans	United States	Smoothie King Center	14,789 / 14,789	$2,449,710
27 May	Raleigh	United States	PNC Arena	14,805 / 14,805	$2,719,928
30 May	Greenville	United States	Bon Secours Wellness Arena	12,123 / 12,123	$2,351,190
1 June	Lexington	United States	Rupp Arena	19,153 / 19,153	$2,785,200
3 June	Fort Wayne	United States	Allen County War Memorial Coliseum	10,695 / 10,695	$1,779,313
6 June	Madison	United States	Kohl Center	12,710 / 12,710	$2,130,572
8 June	Green Bay	United States	Lambeau Field	49,416 / 49,416	$6,529,928
11 June	Moline	United States	TaxSlayer Center	10,613 / 10,613	$1,943,909
14 June	Arlington	United States	Globe Life Park	45,024 / 45,024	$6,313,791
22 June	San Diego	United States	Petco Park	40,224 / 40,224	$6,017,239
26 June	Phoenix	United States	Talking Stick Resort Arena	13,837 / 13,837	$2,717,939
28 June	Las Vegas	United States	T-Mobile Arena	29,822 / 29,822	$7,202,945
29 June	Las Vegas	United States	T-Mobile Arena	29,822 / 29,822	$7,202,945
6 July	Vancouver	Canada	BC Place	40,973 / 40,973	$4,601,154
10 July	San Jose	United States	SAP Center	13,937 / 13,937	$3,241,678
13 July (Note: McCartney reunited with former bandmate Ringo Starr to play Sgt. Pepper's Lonely Hearts Club Band (Reprise) and Helter Skelter. For The End, Joe Walsh made a guest appearance.)	Los Angeles	United States	Dodger Stadium	48,767 / 48,767	$6,410,157
Total				805,868 / 805,868 (100%)	$107,988,665

=== Cancelled shows ===
List of cancelled concerts, showing date, city, country, venue and reason for cancellation
Date	City	Country	Venue	Reason
23 May 2020	Lille	France	Stade Pierre-Mauroy	COVID-19 pandemic
26 May 2020	Paris	France	Paris La Défense Arena	COVID-19 pandemic
29 May 2020	Nijmegen	Netherlands	Goffertpark	COVID-19 pandemic
31 May 2020	Bordeaux	France	Matmut Atlantique	COVID-19 pandemic
4 June 2020	Hannover	Germany	HDI Arena	COVID-19 pandemic
7 June 2020	Lyon	France	Groupama Stadium	COVID-19 pandemic
10 June 2020	Naples	Italy	Piazza del Plebiscito	COVID-19 pandemic
13 June 2020 (Note: The concert on 13 June 2020 in Lucca was due to be part of the Lucca Summer Festival.)	Lucca	Italy	Mura Storiche	COVID-19 pandemic
17 June 2020	Barcelona	Spain	Estadi Olímpic Lluís Companys	COVID-19 pandemic
21 June 2020 (Note: The concert on 21 June 2020 in Werchter was due to be part of TW Classic Festival.)	Werchter	Belgium	Werchter Festival Grounds	COVID-19 pandemic
27 June 2020 (Note: The concert on 27 June 2020 in Pilton was due to be part of the Glastonbury Festival.)	Pilton	England	Worthy Farm	COVID-19 pandemic

== Setlist ==
=== Typical set list ===
1. "A Hard Day's Night"
2. "Hi, Hi, Hi" or "Junior's Farm" or "Save Us"
3. "Can't Buy Me Love" or "All My Loving"
4. "Letting Go"
5. "Who Cares"
6. "Got to Get You Into My Life" (since Tokyo)
7. "Come On To Me"
8. "Let Me Roll It" (with "Foxy Lady" coda)
9. "I've Got a Feeling"
10. "Let 'Em In"
11. "My Valentine"
12. "Nineteen Hundred and Eighty-Five"
13. "Maybe I'm Amazed"
14. "I've Just Seen a Face" or "We Can Work It Out"
15. "In Spite of All the Danger"
16. "From Me To You"
17. "Dance Tonight" (since Copenhagen)
18. "Love Me Do"
19. "Blackbird"
20. "Here Today"
21. "Queenie Eye"
22. "Lady Madonna"
23. "Eleanor Rigby"
24. "Fuh You"
25. "Being for the Benefit of Mr. Kite!"
26. "Something"
27. "Ob-La-Di, Ob-La-Da"
28. "Band on the Run"
29. "Back in the U.S.S.R."
30. "Let It Be"
31. "Live and Let Die"
32. "Hey Jude"
  - Encore
33. "Yesterday" or "Birthday" or "I Saw Her Standing There"
34. "Sgt. Pepper's Lonely Hearts Club Band (Reprise)"
35. "Helter Skelter"
36. "Golden Slumbers"/"Carry That Weight"/"The End"

=== Set lists ===
Austin City Limits Music Festival 1 (October 2018)
1. "A Hard Day's Night"
2. "Hi, Hi, Hi"
3. "Can't Buy Me Love"
4. "Letting Go"
5. "Come On To Me"
6. "Let Me Roll It"
7. "I've Got a Feeling"
8. "My Valentine"
9. "Nineteen Hundred and Eighty-Five"
10. "Maybe I'm Amazed"
11. "I've Just Seen a Face"
12. "In Spite Of All The Danger"
13. "From Me To You"
14. "Love Me Do"
15. "Blackbird"
16. "Here Today"
17. "Lady Madonna"
18. "FourFiveSeconds"
19. "Being For The Benefit Of Mr Kite"
20. "Something"
21. "Ob-La-Di, Ob-La-Da"
22. "Band on the Run"
23. "Back in the U.S.S.R."
24. "Let It Be"
25. "Live and Let Die"
26. "Hey Jude"
  - Encore:
27. "Sgt. Pepper's Lonely Hearts Club Band (Reprise)"
28. "Helter Skelter"
29. "Golden Slumbers"/"Carry That Weight"/"The End"

== See also ==
- List of Paul McCartney concert tours
