= Despite Repeated Warnings =

Song by Paul McCartney

from the album Egypt Station
- Released: 7 September 2018
- Studio: Henson, Hogg Hill Mill, Abbey Road
- Genre: Rock; Progressive pop
- Length: 6:58
- Label: Capitol
- Songwriter: Paul McCartney
- Producers: Greg Kurstin; Paul McCartney

"Despite Repeated Warnings" is a song by the English musician Paul McCartney from his 2018 album Egypt Station.

== Lyrics ==
During a July 2017 speech at the Liverpool Institute of Performing Arts, McCartney revealed that his next album would contain a song about United States president Donald Trump. He did not say if the song was positive or negative towards Trump, only that he felt that he had to write it. In promotional material for Egypt Station, McCartney explained that the title of the song was inspired by a newspaper he read in Japan that contained the phrase while discussing climate change. McCartney was later asked in a BBC News interview about the "mad captain" the song refers to. McCartney stated that while primarily being about Trump, it was also referring to any other leaders who thought climate change was a hoax. McCartney has denied that the repeated "lock him up" lyric was a reference to Trump's use of the phrase "lock her up" in relation to Hillary Clinton. While explaining the song's lyrics in his 2021 book The Lyrics: 1956 to the Present, McCartney refers to Trump as a "braggart" who is "not necessarily the smartest" despite being "the loudest".

== Composition ==
In an interview with Rolling Stone, album producer Greg Kurstin discussed the song as being like McCartney's other "epic, extended songs" such as "Band on the Run" and "Live and Let Die". Kurstin said that the idea to make a song with multiple sections and movements was McCartney's. The song, which grew to nearly seven minutes, required an orchestra and multiple session musicians to complete the arrangement. McCartney described the song as "a little bit operatic" and "something of an epic," with multiple changes in tempo and key throughout the song.

== Critical reception ==
The song received generally positive reviews. Zoya Teirstein of the environmental magazine Grist reviewed the song, calling it a "climate anthem" and praising its composition and message. In Rolling Stone's review of Egypt Station, music journalist Rob Sheffield compared the song to "Uncle Albert/Admiral Halsey" while saying that "Paul's gonna Paul. As he always should." Kitty Empire of The Observer said the song was "another highly characteristic McCartney piano ballad gone funny" and criticized McCartney's use of the name "Janet" to rhyme with "Planet". Slant Magazine's Jeremy Winograd praised the song as one of "McCartney's most exciting and grandiose efforts in years", alongside album closer "Hunt You Down/Naked/C-Link".

== Personnel ==
According to the Egypt Station website:

- Paul McCartney – vocals, piano, harmonium, bass, drums, percussion, acoustic guitar, electric guitar, Moog
- Greg Kurstin – piano, harpsichord, Moog synths, drums and percussion programming
- Wix Wickens – Rhodes, orchestral synths, Hammond
- Abe Laboriel Jr – drums, backing vocals
- Rusty Anderson – acoustic guitar, electric guitar, backing vocals
- Brian Ray – acoustic guitar, electric guitar, backing vocals
- Various orchestra and session musicians
