= Come On to Me (Paul McCartney song) =

Single by Paul McCartney

from the album Egypt Station
- A-side: "I Don't Know"
- Released: 20 June 2018
- Recorded: January 2016 – February 2018
- Studio: Henson, Los Angeles; Hogg Hill Mill, Icklesham; Abbey Road, London
- Genre: Rock
- Length: 4:10
- Label: Capitol
- Songwriter: Paul McCartney
- Producers: Greg Kurstin; Paul McCartney

Paul McCartney singles chronology
"We're On The Road Again" (2017)	"I Don't Know" / "Come On to Me" (2018)	"Fuh You" (2018)

Music video
- "Come On to Me" on YouTube

"Come On to Me" is a song by the English musician Paul McCartney, released by Capitol Records on 20 June 2018 as a double A-side single alongside "I Don't Know", both taken from McCartney's 17th studio album Egypt Station.

"Come On to Me" is described on McCartney's web site as a "raucous stomper that fans that first spark of chemistry into a rocking blaze". The song peaked at No. 10 on Billboard's Adult Contemporary Songs chart, McCartney's first top 10 appearance since 1993.

== Composition and recording ==
In the Words Between Tracks episode about writing a song, McCartney said:

"Come On to Me" is sort of a pick-up song, and I'm imagining myself, probably in the sixties, going to a party and seeing someone and thinking, "Okay, how do I make an approach here?" So it's a sort of, it's an imaginary song, a fantasy song about a guy seeing someone and thinking, "We should try and find a place to be alone here, and maybe exchange information and stuff, and hey you look like you flashed a smile and said to me you wanted so much more than casual conversation. So would you come on to me, or am I going to come on to you?"

The track was recorded at Henson Studios in Los Angeles, with additional sessions recorded at Hog Hill Mill in Sussex and Abbey Road Studios. It was engineered by Steve Orchard, Alex Pasco, Julian Burg, and Greg Kurstin.

== Release ==
"Come On to Me" was released on 20 June 2018. The official Paul McCartney website announced on 11 October 2018 that the exclusive version of the double A-side single would be released as part of Record Store Day. The hand-numbered vinyl was limited to 5,000 copies and was available at independent record stores around the world on 23 November 2018. As of August 2021, the song has over fifteen million streams on Spotify.

== Live performances ==
McCartney's first live performance of "Come On to Me" took place during a surprise show at the Philharmonic Dining Rooms in his native Liverpool on 9 June 2018, which was filmed as part of his "Carpool Karaoke" segment for The Late Late Show with James Corden.

McCartney performed "Come On to Me" live at most of his 2018 Secret Gigs tour. The only concert of the impromptu tour where "Come On to Me" wasn't included in the setlist was a gig at the Liverpool Institute for Performing Arts. On the eve of Egypt Station's release, McCartney performed the song live on The Tonight Show with Jimmy Fallon. The song was also included in the setlist of his Freshen Up tour.

== Personnel ==
- Paul McCartney – lead and backing vocals, electric and acoustic guitars, keyboards, percussion, harmonica
- Paul "Wix" Wickens – keyboards
- Rusty Anderson – electric guitar
- Brian Ray – electric guitar, bass guitar
- Abe Laboriel Jr. – drums
- Greg Phillinganes – piano
- Tim Loo – cello
- Greg Kurstin – electric guitar, percussion
- Muscle Shoals Rhythm Section – horns

== Charts ==
=== Weekly charts ===
Chart (2018)	Peak position
Argentina (Radio)	37
Belgium (Ultratip Bubbling Under Flanders)	18
Belgium (Ultratip Bubbling Under Wallonia)	45
Canada Digital Songs (Billboard)	40
Croatia (HRT)	1
France (SNEP)	147
Hungary (Single Top 40)	18
Japan Hot 100 (Billboard)	26
Japan Hot Overseas (Billboard)	1
Mexico Ingles Airplay (Billboard)	42
Netherlands Digital Songs (Billboard)	8
Poland (LP3)	32
Russia (Tophit)	8
Scotland Singles (OCC)	55
UK Singles Downloads (OCC)	58
US Adult Alternative Airplay (Billboard)	6
US Adult Contemporary (Billboard)	10
US Digital Song Sales (Billboard)	36
US Hot Rock & Alternative Songs (Billboard)	24

=== Year-end charts ===
Chart (2018)	Position
US Adult Contemporary (Billboard)	37
