= Undressing Underwater =

Studio album by Rusty Anderson
- Released: late 2003; re-released 13 September 2005
- Genre: Indie rock
- Length: 40:51
- Label: Surfdog Records
- Producer: Rusty Anderson; David Kahne; Mudrock; Parthenon Huxley

Rusty Anderson chronology
Undressing Underwater (2003)	Born on Earth (2009)

Alternative cover

Undressing Underwater is the debut solo album by Rusty Anderson, originally released on Anderson's own Oxide Records in late 2003, and re-released on September 13, 2005 through Surfdog Records.

== Background ==
Undressing Underwater was recorded at Oxide Studios in Southern California, Sunset Sound and Henson Studios. The album was self-produced by Anderson, along with David Kahne, Mudrock and Parthenon Huxley.

The title of the album was picked by Anderson from a boyscout handbook of the early sixties that listed various things to do underwater, including getting undressed.

The leading track "Hurt Myself" features most of the touring Paul McCartney band, with McCartney on bass and backing vocals, Abe Laboriel Jr. on drums, David Kahne on keyboards and production duties, and Wix Wickens adding additional keyboards.

Anderson stated in an interview that the majority of the recordings "were done in between touring" with Paul McCartney. In that same interview, Anderson mentions that "the songs are mostly about facing one's demons and attempting to bottle them".

== Track listing ==
1. "Hurt Myself" – 3:21
2. "Devil’s Spaceship" – 4:36
3. "Electric Trains" – 4:20
4. "Damaged Goods" – 4:29
5. "Coming Down To Earth" – 4:10
6. "Ol’ Sparky" – 4:04
7. "Catbox Beach" – 4:28
8. "ishmael" -3:45
9. "Sentimental Chaos" – 4:14
10. "Everybody Deserves An A in This Country" – 3:30

== Reception ==
Professional ratings
Review scores
Source	Rating
Allmusic	3.5/5 stars

The reception of Undressing Underwater was generally positive. Gary Glauber of PopMatters stated that the album was "an impressive debut from a startlingly talented musician who has taken a lot of time to get things right". Some reviewers praised Anderson for the number of big-ticket guest stars on the album, from McCartney to Parthenon Huxley. Anderson’s guitar playing ability, experimental views to rock music, and striving to create new combinations of music were mentioned among the positives of the album.

However, reviewers noted that the album did not live up to the greatness that was expected, as stated by a reviewer: "The material itself seems somewhat limited... most of them don't seem to reverberate very far". Reviewer Meredith Williams stated that Rusty Anderson "provides the oh-so-common rock-pop appeal of a catchy chorus, with guitar solos echoing in the background — but not always effectively".

== Personnel ==
- Rusty Anderson - Organ, Guitars, Bass, Strings, Tambourine, Vocals, Producer, Engineer, Vibraphone, Cover Art Concept
- Laura Anne - Photography
- Abe Baruck - Drums
- Gregg Bernstein - Design
- Karl Brown - Piano, Vocals (background)
- Paul Bushnell - Bass
- Lenny Castro - Percussion
- Greg Collins - Mixing
- Scot Coogan - Drums
- Stewart Copeland - Drums
- Paul DuGre - Engineer
- Ted Falcon - Violin
- Evan Frankfort - Mixing
- Probyn Gregory - Fuglehorn
- Parthenon Huxley - Vocals, Producer
- David Kahne - Keyboards, Producer, Engineer, Drum Programming
- Anna Kalinka - Design
- John Krovoza - Cello
- Nicky Panicci Aka Nicky P. - Additional Guitar (Bends) on Catbox Beach
- Abe Laboriel Jr. - Drums
- Paul McCartney - Bass, Guitar (Electric), Vocals
- Ofer Moses - Cover Art Concept
- Gene Nash - Engineer
- Clif Norrell - Engineer
- Brian Ray - Acoustic Guitar
- Dusty Rocherolle - Drums
- Wayne Rodriguez - Drum Programming
- Ralf Strathmann - Photography
- Louie Teran - Mastering
- Gordon Townsend - Drums
- Bob Wartenbee - Engineer
- Randy Wine - Engineer, Mixing
