= Who Cares (Paul McCartney song) =

- The CD cover of the song.

Single by Paul McCartney

from the album Egypt Station
- Released: 17 December 2018
- Recorded: January 2016 – February 2018
- Studio: Henson, Los Angeles
- Genre: Rock
- Length: 3:13 (album version); 5:33 (full length); 6:21 (video version)
- Label: Capitol
- Songwriter: Paul McCartney
- Producers: Greg Kurstin; Paul McCartney

Paul McCartney singles chronology
"Fuh You" (2018)	"Who Cares" (2018)	"Get Enough" (2019)

"Who Cares" (sometimes credited as "Who Cares? I Do!") is a song by English musician Paul McCartney, released as the third single from Egypt Station on 17 December 2018. The song was previously released as a promo track ahead of the album on September 6, 2018.

== Background, composition, and recording ==
In the 'Words Between Tracks' about writing a song, McCartney said:

"With Who Cares, I was thinking about a song where you actually are talking to the people who may listen to it. And in my case I was imagining young fans, or young people who might hear this, and who are going through some sort of problem where they’re being picked on, being put on. These days it would be internet bullying, trolls and all that. In my school days, it would have just been bullies and people just generally picking on each other. So I know that has happened all over the world to millions of people. So my thing was to kind of try and help, try and help, almost kind-of give some sort of advice. So the song says, you know: "have you ever been fed up with being bullied?" Has this ever happened when people have called you names, have done mean things? Has this ever happened to you? Well, who cares. And then in a twist at the end of that chorus is like "Who cares? I do"."

McCartney cited American singer-songwriter Taylor Swift as his main inspiration for the song, said "I was actually thinking about Taylor Swift and her relationship to her young fans". The track was recorded at Henson Studios in Los Angeles. It was engineered by Billy Bush, Steve Orchard, Alex Pasco, Julian Burg and Greg Kurstin.

== Release ==
The song was officially issued on 6 September 2018 with Egypt Station. In December 2018, a short film video was recorded with McCartney and Emma Stone and released as the third single from the album. The video follows a story of a woman played by Stone visiting a behavioural hypnotist (and meteorologist) played by McCartney.

== Personnel ==
- Paul McCartney – lead vocals, bass guitar, acoustic guitar
- Paul "Wix" Wickens – Farfisa and Hammond organs
- Abe Laboriel Jr. – backing vocals, drums
- Rusty Anderson – backing vocals, electric guitar
- Brian Ray – backing vocals, electric guitar
