= Back in Brazil =

Promotional single by Paul McCartney

from the album Egypt Station
- Released: 16 September 2018
- Recorded: October 2017
- Studio: KLB Studios, São Paulo, Brazil
- Genre: Bossa nova; dance
- Length: 3:19
- Label: Capitol
- Songwriter: Paul McCartney
- Producers: Greg Kurstin; Paul McCartney

Music video
- "Back in Brazil " on YouTube

"Back in Brazil" is a song by English musician Paul McCartney, released by Capitol Records. The song was released as a promotional single on 16 September 2018, and is featured on McCartney's 2018 album Egypt Station.

== Recording ==
Rolling Stone called the song one of the weirdest tracks on the album, while noting that McCartney played over nine instruments in the song. The song starts out with a lounge beat, but also included guitar, Wurlitzer piano, conga drums, and a triangle. The chorus of the song consists of McCartney shouting the word "Ichiban!," which is strange because it is a Japanese word and not Portuguese, the language widely spoken in Brazil. When asked why "Ichiban" was included in the song, McCartney explained:

Well, I originally blocked in that little phrase with "hechibam, hechibam" thinking that later - when I went to Brazil - someone would say "Oh, that's very similar to a proper Brazilian word." I was getting a massage in Brazil - and it happened to be by a Japanese lady - and somehow the word "Ichiban" came up in conversation. I said, "That's Japanese, isn't it?" and she said, "Yeah it is! It means great, fabulous, number one!" I thought, "Oh wow, that's it! That's the word!" And the rationale for it was that the largest population of Japanese people - outside Japan - is in Brazil. So I said to her, "Have you got a group of mates that could sing, who could help? I'd like to just record that word ‘Ichiban'!" She said, "Yeah, I could probably..." So I asked, "Do you think they could come to a studio tomorrow?" as I was about leave the country. She said, "Sure, I think I can get some people together!" So I said, "About 6 o'clock or something?" as I was due to leave at around 8 o'clock. She said, "No, no, they'll still be working." So I asked "7 o'clock?" and she said, "Yeah!" So I organised a little studio on the way out to the airport, and managed to arrange for her friends to come! So, I came in and told them what I wanted to do, and we had a lot of fun! It only took about half an hour or so, and I got them to shout "Ichiban! Ichiban!" and we had to try and get it in time, and accurate.

McCartney's producer Greg Kurstin stated that "It was one of the trickier songs to get the feel of, to get the drum groove and all that stuff," and that McCartney "labored for hours working on the song." The song reached number 8 on the Brazilian iTunes chart.

== Music video ==
A music video for the song was released on 16 September 2018. The video follows a story of a beautiful Brazilian woman who invites her boyfriend to a Paul McCartney concert. While stuck at work, the boyfriend cannot go and they nearly break up. At the concert McCartney invites her on stage to dance, and because of that moment she forgives her boyfriend when he comes back to apologize. The concert sequence was recorded during the McCartney's performance in Salvador, 20 October 2017 for the One on One Tour.

== Personnel ==
- Paul McCartney – lead vocals, bass guitar, congas, acoustic guitar, electric guitar, Wurlitzer, harmonium, bird recording, triangle
- Greg Kurstin – wurlitzer, bass FX
- Abe Laboriel Jr. – drums, backing vocals
- Pedro Eustache – bamboo flute, duduk
- String quartet (Abbey Road)

== Charts ==
Chart (2018)	Peak position
Russia (Tophit)	13
UK Top (YouTube)	136
