= Paul McCartney's band =

Studio and touring band of Paul McCartney

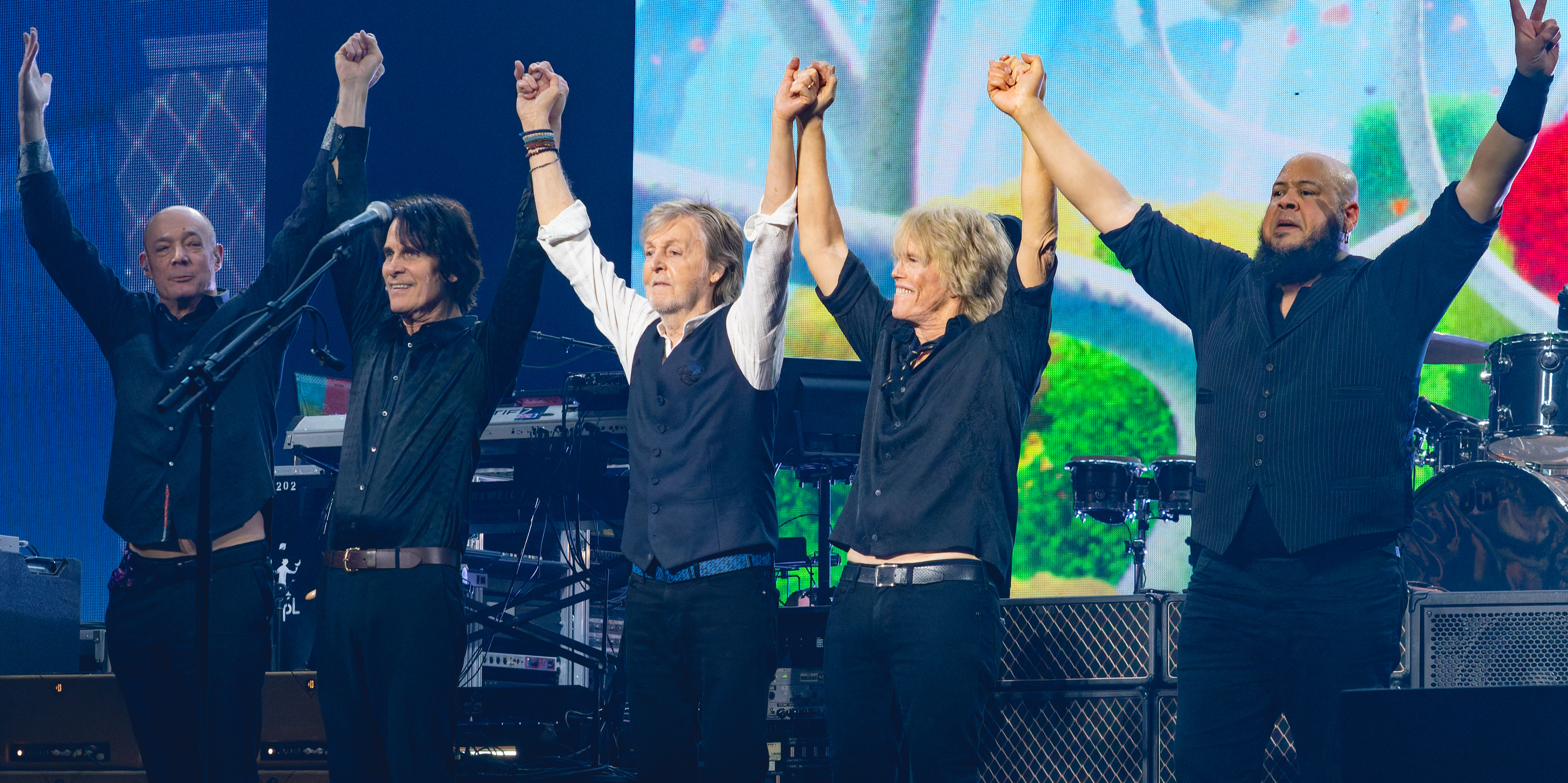
- Paul McCartney and his band at the O2 Arena in 2024. From left: Wix Wickens, Rusty Anderson, Paul McCartney, Brian Ray, and Abe Laboriel Jr.

Background information
- Genres: Rock; pop
- Years active: 1989–1993; 2002–present
- Members: Paul McCartney; Wix Wickens; Rusty Anderson; Abe Laboriel Jr.; Brian Ray; Mike Davis; Paul Burton; Kenji Fenton
- Past members: Blair Cunningham; Linda McCartney; Robbie McIntosh; Hamish Stuart; Chris Whitten
- Website: paulmccartney.com

Paul McCartney has been accompanied live and in the studio by various musicians since the breakup of Wings in 1981. The core line-up of his band has been steady since 2002, and includes Wix Wickens on keyboards and serving as musical director, Rusty Anderson on guitar, Brian Ray on guitar and bass, and Abe Laboriel Jr. on drums. The Hot City Horns joined the band lineup in 2018.

== History ==
McCartney has had two significant incarnations of a backing band since the breakup of Paul McCartney and Wings in 1981. The former band, active from 1989 to 1993 with occasional appearances thereafter, included his wife Linda McCartney on vocals and keyboards, Hamish Stuart on guitar and bass, Wickens on keyboards, and former Pretenders Robbie McIntosh and Blair Cunningham on guitar and drums respectively. Wickens' former collaborator in Edie Brickell & New Bohemians, drummer Chris Whitten, also featured early in this lineup. This lineup played on McCartney's studio albums Flowers in the Dirt and Off the Ground and the live albums Tripping the Live Fantastic, Unplugged (The Official Bootleg), and Paul Is Live.

McCartney began to coalesce a new band on his next few albums following Linda's death in 1998. Driving Rain featured Anderson and Laboriel; Ray was recruited one day before McCartney performed "Freedom" at Super Bowl XXXVI and joined the band on Chaos and Creation in the Backyard. Memory Almost Full returned Wickens to the lineup. New and Egypt Station featured all four. Anderson and Laboriel also appeared on one track of McCartney III, an album on which all instruments other than theirs were played by McCartney himself.

McCartney credits the band's familiarity for their continued cohesiveness. He said in 2014, "I trust the guys. They know what I'm going to do, I know what they are going to do. We surprise each other—and even if it's like, 'I didn't know you were going to do that,' we can all follow it. That's the great thing with a band. And all of us just come to play music. There's no other thing on the agenda. We just love playing together."

The quintet has also been the backbone of two decades of world tours. They appear on the live albums and DVDs Back in the U.S., Back in the World Live, Paul McCartney in Red Square, The Space Within US, Good Evening New York City, and Live in Los Angeles, the latter with David Arch filling in for Wickens. The lineup returned to the Super Bowl for McCartney's halftime show in 2005. In 2010, they played together at the White House when McCartney received the Gershwin Prize from President Barack Obama.

The current incarnation has been together longer than any of McCartney's other bands, including the Beatles and Wings. McCartney noted in 2014, "A couple of years ago, I kind of looked at them and said: 'You know what guys? We're a band. We're a real band. I think up until then we'd just been thinking: 'We're getting together, and playing some songs.' But we're a band now—and that elevated our performance, I think. When we realized that, we sort of felt so much better about what we were doing."

== Members ==
=== Current lineup ===
- Paul McCartney – lead vocals, bass, rhythm and lead guitars, piano, keyboards, ukulele, mandolin, percussion, drums (1989–present)
- Rusty Anderson – lead and rhythm guitars, backing vocals (2002–present)
- Brian Ray – rhythm and lead guitars, bass, percussion, backing vocals (2002–present)
- Paul "Wix" Wickens – keyboards, accordion, rhythm guitar, bass, harmonica, percussion, backing vocals (1989–present)
- Abe Laboriel Jr. – drums, percussion, backing and occasional lead vocals (2002–present)
- Hot City Horns – Mike Davis (trumpet), Paul Burton (trombone), Kenji Fenton (saxophones)

=== Past members ===
- Linda McCartney – co-lead vocals, keyboards, autoharp, percussion (1989–1993; died in 1998)
- Robbie McIntosh – lead guitar, piano, backing vocals (1989–1993)
- Hamish Stuart – rhythm guitar, bass, backing and occasional lead vocals (1989–1993)
- Chris Whitten – drums, percussion (1989–1990)
- Blair Cunningham – drums, percussion (1990–1993)
