= In Spite of All the Danger =

1958 song by the Quarrymen

- Original 78 rpm acetate

Song by the Quarrymen

from the album Anthology 1
- A-side: "That'll Be the Day"
- Released: 20 November 1995
- Recorded: c. May–July 1958 (Note: Regarding the date of recording, Mark Lewisohn writes: The session cannot be dated with any certainty because the group's name doesn't show in the studio logbook, save for a note on the inside cover that reads merely "Arthur Kelly of Quarrymen." A plaque above the door of the house, unveiled in 2005, gives a precise session date of (Monday) 14 July 1958, but how this was arrived at has never been convincingly demonstrated; it could have been a month or two earlier.)
- Studio: Phillips Sound Recording Service, Liverpool
- Genre: Doo-wop
- Length: 3:25 (Original acetate); 2:42 (Anthology 1)
- Label: Apple Records
- Songwriters: Paul McCartney and George Harrison (Note: In an interview with Mark Lewisohn, McCartney recalls: It says on the label that it was me and George but I think it was actually written by me and George played the guitar solo! We were mates and nobody was into copyrights and publishing, nobody understood—we actually used to think when we came down to London that songs belonged to everyone. I've said this a few times but it's true, we really thought they just were in the air, and that you couldn't actually own one. So you can imagine the publishers saw us coming! 'Welcome boys, sit down. That's what you think, is it?' So that's what we used to do in those days—and because George did the solo we figured that he 'wrote' the solo. That wouldn't be the case now: [Bruce] Springsteen writes the record and the guy who plays the solo doesn't 'write' it.")
- Producer: Percy Phillips

"In Spite of All the Danger" is the first song recorded by the Quarrymen, then consisting of John Lennon, Paul McCartney, George Harrison, pianist John Lowe, and drummer Colin Hanton.

McCartney wrote the song and Harrison provided the guitar solo, and so the song is credited to McCartney–Harrison. Recording took place sometime between May and July 1958 at Percy Phillips' home studio in Liverpool.

== Composition and structure ==
Paul McCartney wrote the song on his own, likely around January 1958 and possibly at George Harrison's family home in Upton Green. The song uses the B^{7} chord, which McCartney discovered with Harrison after a multi-bus trip across Liverpool to the home of a stranger who knew the chord. Harrison wrote both of the song's guitar solos, and so McCartney gave him a joint credit. In The Beatles Anthology, McCartney describes it as, "a self-penned little song very influenced by Elvis [Presley]." In an interview with Beatles historian Mark Lewisohn, McCartney goes further and explains that the song is very similar to a specific Elvis song, though he avoids mentioning which particular one. Lewisohn writes that, though McCartney wrote the track on his own, it is heavily based on the melody of Elvis's "Tryin' to Get to You", which also includes the similar lyric, "[in] spite of all that I've been through." Musicologist Walter Everett agrees, writing that "its cadence comes close". Chris Ingram says it was "clearly inspired" by it, and John C. Winn says it was "fashioned after" it.

Everett writes that most of the Beatles' earliest compositions were "thoroughly diatonic, grounded solidly in the major scale," and includes this song as an example.

The song is in the key of E and follows a standard I-I^{7}-IV-V^{7}-I-IV-I (E-E^{7}-A-B^{7}-E-A-E) progression. Here the harmonic development initially arises with the move (in bar 5 on "I'll do anything for you") to a subdominant or IV (a chord built on the 4th degree of the E major scale), but without the intervening range of chords prolonging harmonic tension that so characterised later Beatles songwriting. The resolution back to the tonic comes as the V chord (B^{7} in bar 8 on "you want me to") shifts to the I (E chord on "true to me"). Everett writes that the bridge "[culminates] in a stop-time retransition on a blue-note colored V." This "dramatic placement of stop time ... at the end of the bridge" was something the Beatles saw regularly, including in "Come Go with Me", before they used it in "In Spite of All the Danger". They used the technique again in their later compositions "There's a Place" and "This Boy".

== Recording ==
Around July 1958, the Quarrymen paid for a recording session at Percy Phillips' home in Kensington, Liverpool, recording a cover of Buddy Holly's "That'll Be the Day" and "In Spite of All the Danger". Lennon, McCartney and Harrison all played guitar, (Note: Walter Everett writes that the guitars are amplified acoustic guitars. Mark Lewisohn writes Lennon and McCartney play acoustic while Harrison uses "a pickup through Paul's Elpico amp.") John "Duff" Lowe the piano and Colin Hanton the drums. Recording was achieved with a single microphone suspended from the ceiling, no volume balancing possible. Curtains and carpets were put in the downstairs living room to dampen the noise of traffic from the street outside. At nearly three and a half minutes, the song is much longer than most pop recordings of the time. (Note: The median length of 1958 chart numbers was 2:25. Of the 200 new tracks that made it on the British Hit Parade in 1958, only two were longer than 3:30.) Lewisohn writes, "anecdotes have Percy Phillips waving his arms at them, hurrying them to a finish, because he could see the disc-cutting lathe reaching its ultimate point, almost at the center label."

The recording was cut directly to a single two sided shellac-on-metal 78-rpm disc. (Note: Lewisohn explains, An acetate, or lacquer, was an aluminum disc with a nitrocellulose lacquer coating; because the grooves were softer than a conventionally pressed record, the sound quality deteriorated by degrees each time it was played. Acetates were much used in the music business as the quickest and easiest means of distributing recorded sound.) The disc likely cost the group 17s 6d. In a 1977 interview, Phillips recalled that the group initially only paid 15 shillings and someone returned a few days later with the remaining amount and to buy the record.

The only earlier recording of the Quarrymen is a reel-to-reel tape-recording made by an audience member on 6 July 1957, during the Quarrymen's last set for the 1957 Rose Queen garden fête at St. Peter's Church, Woolton, Liverpool.

== Release and reception ==
With only one copy of the recording made, the group members shared the disc for a week each. Lowe was the last to have it, keeping it for nearly 25 years. In 1981, he prepared to sell it at auction, but McCartney intervened and purchased it directly from him. McCartney had engineers restore as much of the record's sound quality as possible and then made approximately 50 copies of the single that he gave as personal gifts to family and friends. In 2004, Record Collector magazine named the original pressing the most valuable record in existence, estimating its worth at £100,000, with the 1981 copies made by McCartney coming in second on the list at £10,000 each.

"In Spite of All the Danger" was not released to the public until it appeared on the 1995 compilation album Anthology 1 along with "That'll Be the Day", though the former was shortened to 2:42 from its original 3:25 runtime.

Lewisohn describes the song as "a chugging and melodic country-flavored number". He further writes that the record "[is] not representative of their sound at any time other than this moment, which was a long way from the rough skiffle scuffle of tea-chest bass, washboard and banjo that was its start." Everett calls the song "Les Paul-like". Musicologist and writer Ian MacDonald writes that the song is "a dreary doo-wop pastiche" which "has little to recommend it".

== Performances ==
McCartney played the song throughout his 2004 Summer and 2005 US tours and would continue to perform it through his 2016–17 One on One, 2018–19 Freshen Up and 2022–24 Got Back tours. At the 2005 promotional concert Chaos and Creation at Abbey Road, Paul performed an acoustic version after explaining the background of the song. A recording of McCartney's concert at The Cavern Club in 2018, which featured a performance of the song with his touring band, was broadcast on Christmas Day 2020 on BBC One.

== In popular culture ==
The song appears in the 2009 biographical film Nowhere Boy, directed by Sam Taylor-Johnson, where it is performed by Aaron Taylor-Johnson as John Lennon, Thomas Brodie-Sangster as Paul McCartney, and Sam Bell as George Harrison. The scene occurs near the end of the film.

== Personnel ==
According to MacDonald, except where noted:

- John Lennon – lead vocal, rhythm guitar
- Paul McCartney – backing vocal, (Note: In an interview with Mark Lewisohn, McCartney says, " ... I sang the lead, I think so anyway. It was my song. It's very similar to an Elvis song. It's me doing an Elvis". In The Beatles Anthology, McCartney says "John and I sang it ..." In an April 1975 radio interview with Paul Drew, Lennon recalled of the session, " ... I sang both sides. I was such a bully in those days I didn't even let Paul sing his own song." Everett writes, "we hear Lennon singing lead with McCartney providing only a simple descant ..." Lewisohn writes, "John again sings lead on 'In Spite of All the Danger', Paul provides more fine harmonies throughout ..." Musicologist and writer Ian MacDonald agrees that Lennon sings the lead vocal.) rhythm guitar
- George Harrison – lead guitar, backing vocal
- John "Duff" Lowe – piano
- Colin Hanton – drums

== Sources ==
- The Beatles (2000). The Beatles Anthology. San Francisco: Chronicle Books. ISBN 978-0-8118-2684-6.
- Everett, Walter (2001). The Beatles As Musicians: The Quarry Men through Rubber Soul. Oxford and New York: Oxford University Press. ISBN 978-0-19-514105-4.
- Ingham, Chris (2006). The Rough Guide to The Beatles (2nd ed.). London: Rough Guides. ISBN 978-1-84353-720-5.
- Lewisohn, Mark (1988). The Complete Beatles Recording Sessions. New York: Harmony. ISBN 978-0-517-57066-1.
- Lewisohn, Mark (2013). The Beatles – All These Years, Volume One: Tune In. Crown Archetype. ISBN 978-1-4000-8305-3.
- MacDonald, Ian (2005). Revolution in the Head: The Beatles' Records and the Sixties (2nd revised ed.). London: Pimlico. ISBN 978-1-84413-828-9.
- Pedler, Dominic (2003). The Songwriting Secrets of The Beatles. London: Omnibus. ISBN 978-0-7119-8167-6.
- Winn, John C. (2008). Way Beyond Compare: The Beatles' Recorded Legacy, Volume One, 1957–1965. New York: Three Rivers Press. ISBN 978-0-307-45157-6.
