= I Don't Know (Paul McCartney song) =

2018 single by Paul McCartney

Single by Paul McCartney

from the album Egypt Station
- A-side: "Come On to Me"
- Released: 20 June 2018
- Recorded: January 2016 – February 2018
- Studio: Henson Recording, Hollywood; Hog Hill Mill, Icklesham; Abbey Road, London
- Genre: Ballad
- Length: 4:27
- Label: Capitol
- Songwriter: Paul McCartney
- Producers: Greg Kurstin; Paul McCartney

Paul McCartney singles chronology
"Hope for the Future" (2014)	"I Don't Know" / "Come On to Me" (2018)	"Fuh You" (2018)

"I Don't Know" is a song by English musician Paul McCartney, released by Capitol Records as a double A-side single alongside "Come On to Me", ahead of McCartney's 17th studio album, Egypt Station.

McCartney's website described "I Don't Know" as a "plaintive, soul-soothing ballad as only Paul can deliver."

In the 'Casual Conversation with Jarvis Cocker at LIPA' (25 July 2018), McCartney said that in his opinion John Lennon would like this song.

== Background, composition, and recording ==
In the 'Words Between Tracks' about writing a song, McCartney said:

"I wrote this after going through a difficult period. Like people have nothing sort of madly serious or anything, but just one of those days when it’s like, "Oh my god, am I doing wrong here", you know. And sometimes that’s a good way to write a song, because you’re coming from your soul. And we often used to say that writing a song was like talking to a psychiatrist, a therapist or something. Because you’re saying it… You are saying it in a song rather than in a room to a specialist. Yeah, so it was me just thinking this problem out, and putting it into a song."

The track was recorded at Henson Studios in Los Angeles, with additional sessions recorded at Hog Hill Mill (Sussex) and Abbey Road Studios. "I Don't Know" was also engineered by Steve Orchard, Alex Pasco, Billy Bush, Julian Burg and Greg Kurstin.

== Release ==
The song was officially issued on 20 June 2018. On 11 October 2018, the official Paul McCartney website announced that the exclusive version of the double A-side single would be released as part of Record Store Day. The hand-numbered vinyl was limited to 5,000 copies and was available at independent record stores around the world on 23 November 2018.

== Reception ==
"I Don't Know" received favorable reviews from critics. In The Guardian, Alexis Petridis wrote that "I Don't Know" is "impossibly sumptuous" and "shows [McCartney's] extraordinary melodic facility is completely intact". Pitchfork described it as having a "bleakness ... almost unprecedented in McCartney's catalog". A review in The Times praised its "beautiful piano melody" and compared it to McCartney's early solo work—"equally breezy and sad".

== Personnel ==
- Paul McCartney – lead and backing vocals, bass guitar, acoustic guitar, piano, percussion, drums
- Greg Kurstin – electric guitar, Mellotron, synthesizer, cello, clarinet, timpani
- Rob Millett – cimbalom

== Charts ==
Chart (2018)	Peak position
Belgium (Ultratip Bubbling Under Flanders)	18
Belgium (Ultratip Bubbling Under Wallonia)	45
France (SNEP)	107
Russia (Tophit)	6
UK Vinyl Singles (OCC)	3
US Hot Rock & Alternative Songs (Billboard)	39
US Rock Digital Songs (Billboard)	12
