= Get Enough =

Single by Paul McCartney
- Released: 1 January 2019 (streaming) 10 & 17 May 2019 (CD)
- Recorded: January 2016 – February 2018
- Studio: Hogg Hill Mill, Icklesham; Patriot, Los Angeles
- Genre: Pop
- Length: 2:58
- Label: Capitol
- Songwriters: Paul McCartney; Ryan Tedder; Zach Skelton
- Producers: Ryan Tedder; Paul McCartney; Zack Skelton

Paul McCartney singles chronology
"Who Cares" (2018)	"Get Enough" (2019)	"Nothing For Free" (2019)

"Get Enough" is a song by English musician Paul McCartney, released as a surprise single on 1 January 2019.

== Release ==
"Get Enough" was a surprise release with no promotion from McCartney or his label prior to its release. The song is a non-album track and does not feature on his Egypt Station studio album standard (or Target) version but later featured on CD (only) on the "Traveller's Edition" and "Explorer's Edition" box sets version of the album (a strictly limited Deluxe edition of 3,000 copies released on 10 May 2019 for the former version and a widespread edition released on 17 May 2019 for the latter version). The release of the song marked 2019 as the 59th consecutive year (since 1961) either The Beatles, or a member of that group, has released a single or an album during the calendar year. The song reached number 21 on the Brazilian iTunes chart.

== Composition ==
"Get Enough" is a piano ballad that features heavy use of Auto-Tune to alter McCartney's voice. McCartney was originally concerned about the possible backlash of using Auto-Tune, but decided to use it based on The Beatles' willingness to embrace new production techniques.

The song was co-written and produced with McCartney by Ryan Tedder and Zach Skelton and was one of three songs McCartney produced with Tedder during the recording of his album Egypt Station, the other two being "Fuh You" and "Nothing for Free".

== Track listing ==
- Streaming single / CD box set edition
1. "Get Enough" – 2:58

== Personnel ==
- Paul McCartney – lead vocal, bass guitar, piano, acoustic guitar, harpsichord, synthesizer, synth-bass and drums
- Ryan Tedder – programming, background vocals
- Zach Skelton – editing and programming 9
