= Rusty Anderson =

American guitarist (born 1959)

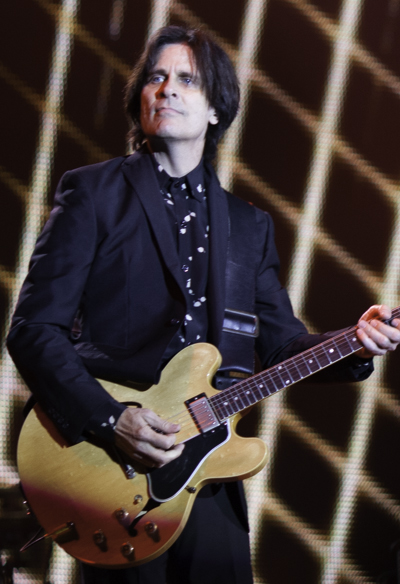
- Anderson in 2014

Background information
- Born: January 20, 1959 (age 67); La Habra, California, U.S.
- Genre: Rock
- Occupations: Musician; songwriter
- Instruments: Guitar, vocals
- Member of: Rusty Anderson Afternoon
- Formerly of: Ednaswap
- Website: rustyanderson.com

Rusty Anderson (born January 20, 1959) is an American musician best known for his work as lead guitarist for Paul McCartney's touring band since 2001. He has worked with an extensive list of other artists in addition to his own solo career.

== Career ==
Anderson became a professional musician at age 14 with his first band, Eulogy. Eulogy won a sizeable local following in Los Angeles, playing with bands such as the Police, Van Halen, the Runaways, Quiet Riot, Rick Derringer, Eddie Money and the Motels. Later, Anderson formed The Living Daylights, which shared the stage with Fishbone and OMD. The Living Daylights was a psychedelic/progressive rock band and Anderson's first as primary songwriter. The Living Daylights put out a record on the Greenworld Label, but subsequently disbanded when Anderson signed a solo development deal at Columbia Records.

In 1993, along with Scott Cutler and Anne Preven, Carla Azar and Paul Bushnell, Anderson formed Ednaswap. Ednaswap shared the stage with Sublime and Social Distortion, and toured as opener for No Doubt and Weezer. The band released four major label records on East West and Island Records, and penned the worldwide Number One hit song "Torn".

For his debut solo album Undressing Underwater, Anderson invited Paul McCartney to play bass and the rest of the McCartney band to sing backup vocals on the lead track, "Hurt Myself". Friend and former bandmate Stewart Copeland also came in to play drums on the song "Catbox Beach". The album was self-produced by Anderson, along with David Kahne, Mudrock and Parthenon Huxley. Undressing Underwater was originally released in late 2003 by his own Oxide Records, and re-released in September 2005 on Surfdog Records, iTunes and Amazon.

Anderson's second album Born on Earth was released October 2009. His third release was a compilation album titled Until We Meet Again, and released in the spring of 2012 with pre-release copies available during the winter 2011 leg of Paul McCartney's On the Run tour.

Anderson's 2022 solo single, "Firefly," again with Copeland on drums, was described on WAER as " neo-Bossa nova ... destined for adult contemporary radio."

=== Rusty Anderson Afternoon ===
Joining with his longtime collaborator, Todd O'Keefe, Anderson formed his new band, Rusty Anderson Afternoon, in 2013. O'Keefe is a Los Angeles musician known for his work with Ray Davies, Black Francis, and The 88. O'Keefe and Anderson had played together for several years in Anderson's solo group, introduced variously as "Rusty Anderson Band" and "Rusty Anderson and Friends". The band performed in cities throughout the United States, The UK and Iceland. Once Anderson and O'Keefe began sharing songwriting and lead vocal duties it was time to pick a name for the new band. A contest was held online. Fans voted for their favorite band name and the winner was "Rusty Anderson Afternoon." The brand new band was showcased at the Gibson Beverly Hills showroom debut of the Rusty Anderson Gibson ES-335 signature guitar, in coordination with the Natural Resources Defense Council, an environmental charity.

Now officially a band, Rusty Anderson Afternoon released their first single, "Effortless", on April 30, 2013. "Effortless" made it to No. 1 at Sirius Radio's "20 on 20". The band released Rusty Anderson Afternoon II on the Oxide Records label on July 31, 2014, produced by Anderson and Paul Ratazcjack, whom Anderson worked with years earlier with the bands Soldier and The Living Daylights. The band's second single, a version of the Stewart and Gouldman song "I'm Not in Love" began in rotation on "The Blend," a Sirius radio station, in August 2014.

Rusty Anderson Afternoon was a featured act at SXSW 2014. In addition to a club performance, the band was featured at SXSW's tribute to Jimi Hendrix. Anderson and O'Keefe performed Hendrix's "Little Wing" and "Spanish Castle Magic" for the debut of the United States Postal Service Jimi Hendrix Forever Stamp in Butler Park in Austin, Texas. The band also performed at the Leo Fender Museum Center in Fullerton, California in 2014 and the Hard Rock Casino in Lake Tahoe, Nevada, in 2015.

In April 2016 the band premiered its next single, "Evidence" on the syndicated worldwide show "Passport Approved", airing on over 30 alternative radio stations. Their first full album, RAA, produced by Anderson and Ratazcjack on Anderson's Oxide label, was released shortly thereafter in May 2016 and debuted in the Top Ten on iTunes Alternative New Releases chart the week of its release. Early media responses to the record described it as "most accomplished and brilliant. During 2016–2017 the band performed several shows in California, including San Juan Capistrano and at Pepperdine University in Malibu. In 2019, Rusty Anderson Afternoon performed at the Duesenberg Imperial Charity Ball.

=== Paul McCartney ===
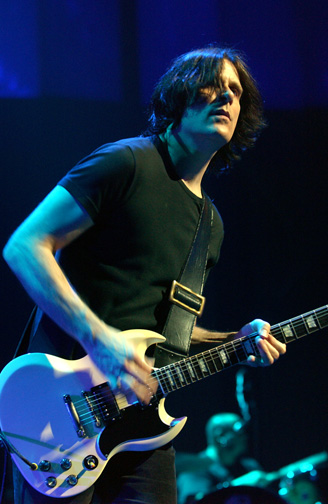
Anderson in 2006

In 2001, Anderson, along with drummer Abe Laboriel Jr., got a call from producers Mo Jackson and David Kahne to play and sing on Paul McCartney's studio album Driving Rain. This became the birth of McCartney's widely praised band, which Variety called "as tight a unit as they come". After finishing the record and performing at The Concert for New York City, the band began the Driving World Tour in April 2002, playing well over 100 shows in the US, Japan, and Mexico. The Driving World Tour was Billboard's Top Tour of 2002. The Back in the World tour followed in 2003. Subsequent high-profile performances included the Roman Colosseum, Live 8 UK and Red Square in Moscow.

Following the success of this tour three multi-Platinum DVDs were released, all featuring Anderson on guitar: Back in the U.S., Paul McCartney in Red Square, and The Space Within US. Anderson also performed with McCartney at the Super Bowl twice, in 2002 and 2005. Anderson played guitar on McCartney's Chaos and Creation in the Backyard in 2005 and contributed guitar and vocals to the 2007 release, Memory Almost Full. He also took part in Good Evening New York City, playing lead guitar on its Grammy winning song "Helter Skelter", and Good Evening Europe.

Anderson continued performing during the Summer Live '09 Tour and the Up and Coming Tour. In 2010, the McCartney band performed at the White House for President Barack Obama and First Lady Michelle Obama for the PBS series In Performance at the White House. Several prominent performances in 2012 included the Olympics opening ceremony, the Queen's Diamond Jubilee Concert and the Grammy Awards.

McCartney released New in 2013 on which Anderson played guitar and sang backing vocals. McCartney's Out There tour also began in 2013 in South America and continued through 2015. Anderson won critical praise during the tour for the many highlights he contributed to the musical arrangements. In 2015, Anderson performed with McCartney on the Saturday Night Live 40th Anniversary Special on NBC. The 2016–2017 worldwide One on One tour was described in Salon as "perfect and life-affirming—well-sequenced, well-paced and incredibly satisfying". Argentina's La Nación said during the tour "Anderson is the virtuoso of the six strings, the greatest rocker of all". The Detroit Free Press noted that the band is "brimming with class, chops and energetic focal points in guitarist Rusty Anderson."

After the 2018 announcements of McCartney's Egypt Station album and Freshen Up Tour, Anderson performed with McCartney at "secret" gigs at Abbey Road Studio in London, the Cavern Club in Liverpool, and New York City's Grand Central Station. McCartney also headlined the Austin City Limits Music Festival in Texas.

The 2022 Got Back Tour began in Spokane with a sold-out show, with the tour's American dates preceding the Glastonbury Festival.

=== Other collaborations and performances ===
Anderson's recordings include music by Elton John, Little Richard, New Radicals, Willie Nelson, Tim McGraw, Faith Hill, Michael Bublé, Sinéad O'Connor, the Wallflowers, Jewel, Santana, Stevie Nicks, Ronan Keating, Joe Cocker, and the surf riff in Ricky Martin's "Livin' La Vida Loca", inducted in 2022 into the National Recording Registry of the U.S. Library of Congress. Also, the Bangles, Lisa Marie Presley, Matthew Sweet, Neil Diamond, Animal Logic (with Copeland and Stanley Clarke), Belinda Carlisle, Susanna Hoffs, Renée Fleming, k.d. lang, Parthenon Huxley, Carole King, Gwen Stefani, Perry Farrell, Steven Tyler, Regina Spektor, Gaby Moreno, Dido, Aimee Mann, Cat Stevens, Miley Cyrus, Eros Ramazzotti, Nelly Furtado, Lana Del Rey, Enrique Iglesias, OPM, Mandy Moore, and Robi Draco Rosa. Anderson also played guitar for the multi-artist tribute project The Art of McCartney, which featured such musicians as Bob Dylan, Barry Gibb, B.B. King, Chrissie Hynde, Billy Joel, and Brian Wilson.

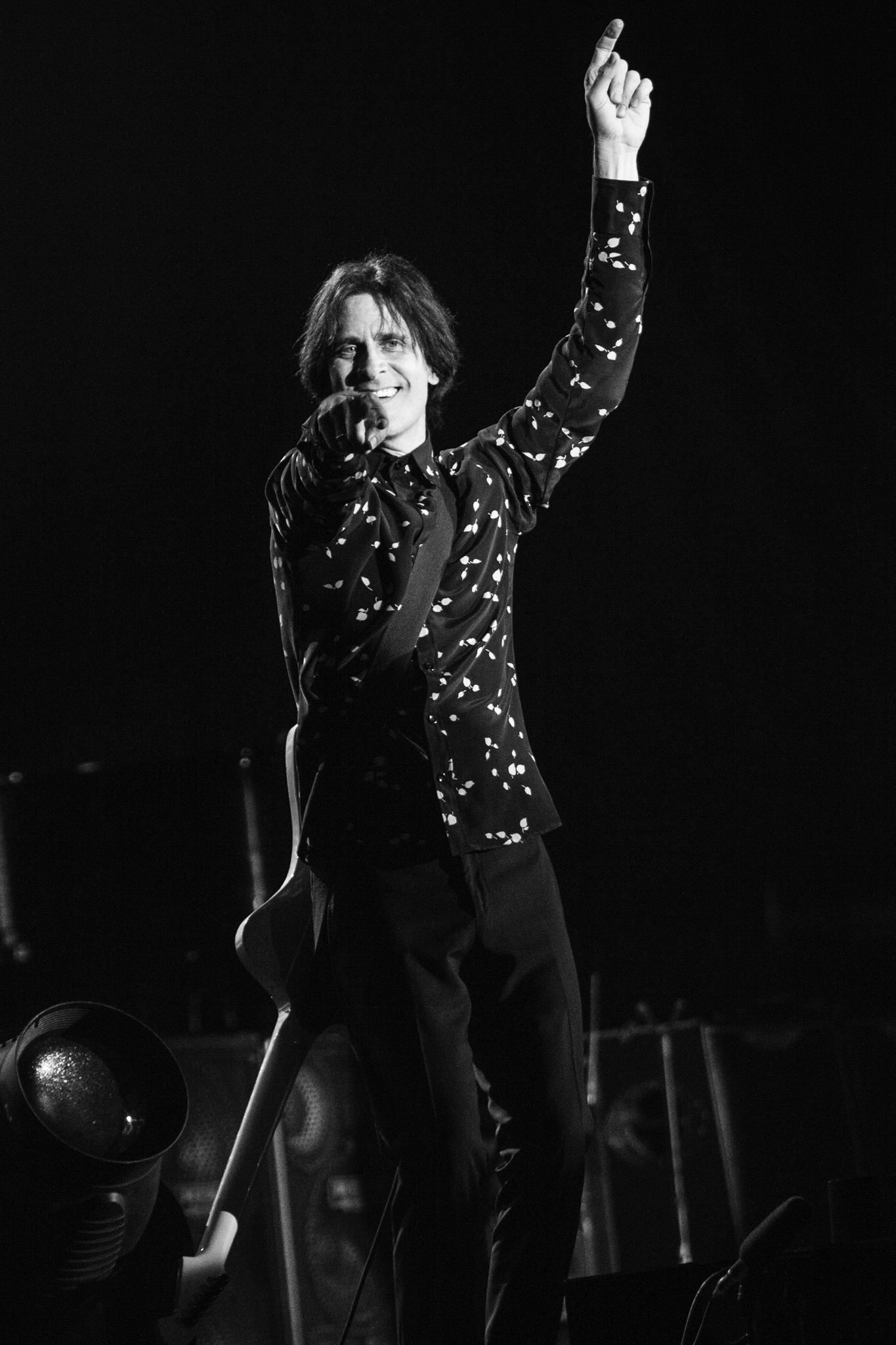
Anderson performing in 2014

He has performed live with such notables as Ringo Starr, Stevie Wonder, Neil Young, Doug Pinnick, Ron Wood, Rihanna, Robbie Krieger, Bruce Springsteen, Joe Walsh, Dave Grohl, Slash, Steve Lukather, Joe Sumner, Mary Bridget Davies, Bob Weir, Brittany Howard, Diana Krall, Krist Novoselic, and Wayne Kramer; Anderson has also played "The Star Spangled Banner" live on solo guitar at Dodger Stadium.

=== Producer and composer ===
In addition to Anderson's solo songwriting career, he has written with and produced acts such as Chris Shaffer of the Why Store, Jordan Lawhead, and Emma Burgess, resulting in song uses in TV shows Cold Case, Men in Trees, Kyle XY, and Wildfire. Other soundtrack credits include Highlander, Highlander II, and Beyond Westworld. The Rusty Anderson Afternoon song "Points of Interest" was featured on the hit CBS comedy The Big Bang Theory in 2014.

== Discography ==
- Undressing Underwater (2005)
- Born on Earth (2009)
- Rusty Anderson Afternoon II (2014)
- RAA (2016)

== Collaborations ==
With Bryan Adams

- Tracks of My Years (Polydor Records, 2014)
- Get Up (Polydor Records, 2015)
- Shine a Light (Polydor Records, 2019)

With The Bangles

- Different Light (Columbia Records, 1986)

With Michael Bublé

- Crazy Love (Reprise Records, 2009)
- Christmas (Reprise Records, 2011)
- To Be Loved (Reprise Records, 2013)
- Higher (Reprise Records, 2022)

With Belinda Carlisle

- Live Your Life Be Free (MCA Records, 1991)

With Melanie C

- Reason (Virgin Records, 2003)

With Joe Cocker

- Respect Yourself (EMI, 2002)

With Miley Cyrus

- Breakout (Hollywood Records, 2008)

With Taylor Dayne

- Satisfied (Adrenaline, 2008)

With Lana Del Rey

- Honeymoon (Polydor Records, 2015)

With Neil Diamond

- Lovescape (Columbia Records, 1991)

With Dido

- No Angel (Arista Records, 1999)
- Life for Rent (Arista Records, 2003)

With Nelly Furtado

- Loose (Interscope Records, 2006)
- The Spirit Indestructible (Interscope Records, 2012)

With The Graces

- Perfect View (A&M Records, 1989)

With Geri Halliwell

- Scream If You Wanna Go Faster (EMI, 2001)

With Nona Hendryx

- Skin Diver (Private Music, 1989)

With Taylor Hicks

- Taylor Hicks (Arista Records, 2006)

With Susanna Hoffs

- When You're a Boy (Columbia Records, 1991)

With Enrique Iglesias

- Enrique (Interscope, 1999)
- Escape (Interscope, 2001)

With Yusuf Islam

- An Other Cup (Atlantic Records, 2006)

With Courtney Jaye

- Traveling Light (Island Records, 2005)

With Jewel

- 0304 (Atlantic Records, 2003)

With Elton John

- Songs from the West Coast (Mercury Records, 2001)

With Ronan Keating

- Ronan (Polydor Records, 2000)
- Destination (Polydor Records, 2002)
- Fires (Polydor Records, 2012)

With Tonio K.

- Olé (Gadfly Records, 1997)

With Carole King

- Love Makes the World (Koch Records, 2001)

With k.d. lang

- Invincible Summer (Warner Bros. Records, 2000)

With Ricky Martin

- Vuelve (Columbia Records, 1998)
- Ricky Martin (Columbia Records, 1999)
- Sound Loaded (Columbia Records, 2000)
- Life (Columbia Records, 2005)

With Paul McCartney

- Driving Rain (Parlophone Records, 2001)
- Chaos and Creation in the Backyard (Parlophone Records, 2005)
- Memory Almost Full (Hear Music, 2007)
- New (Hear Music, 2013)
- Egypt Station (Capitol Records, 2018)
- McCartney III (Capitol Records, 2020)

With Tim McGraw

- Emotional Traffic (Curb Records, 2012)
- Damn Country Music (Big Machine Records, 2015)

With Ingrid Michaelson

- Human Again (Mom + Pop Music, 2012)

With Billie Myers

- Vertigo (Universal, 2000)

With Stevie Nicks

- Trouble in Shangri-La (Reprise Records, 2001)

With Sinéad O'Connor

- Faith and Courage (Atlantic Records, 2000)

With OPM

- Menace to Sobriety (Atlantic Records, 2000)

With Hope Partlow

- Who We Are (Virgin Records, 2005)

With Lisa Marie Presley

- To Whom It May Concern (Capitol Records, 2003)

With The Pussycat Dolls

- Doll Domination (Interscope Records, 2008)

With Jessica Riddle

- Key of a Minor (Hollywood Records, 2000)

With Richie Sambora

- Aftermath of the Lowdown (Dangerbird Records, 2012)

With Santana

- Shaman (Arista Records, 2002)

With Ron Sexsmith

- Long Player Late Bloomer (Thirty Tigers, 2011)

With Michael W. Smith

- Stand (Reunion, 2006)

With Patty Smyth

- Patty Smyth (MCA Records, 1992)

With Gwen Stefani

- Love. Angel. Music. Baby. (Interscope Records, 2004)

With Matthew Sweet

- Inside (Sony Music, 1986)

With Rob Thomas

- ...Something More (Melisma Records, 2005)
- Cradlesong (Atlantic Records, 2009)
- Someday (Atlantic Records, 2010)

With Kim Wilde

- Love Is (MCA Records, 1992)
