= Paul McCartney's 2018 Secret Gigs =

Impromptu live shows by Paul McCartney

- Transcontinental tour by Paul McCartney
- Location: Europe • North America
- Associated album: Egypt Station
- Start date: 9 June 2018
- End date: 7 September 2018
- No. of shows: 5

Paul McCartney concert chronology
- One on One (2016–17); 2018 Secret Gigs (2018); Freshen Up (2018–2019)

Paul McCartney's 2018 Secret Gigs were an impromptu tour of five free shows – four Spring/Summer 2018 shows in England in small private venues and one Summer 2018 show in the United States in a bigger private venue – by Paul McCartney, scheduled to promote the forthcoming release (on 7 September 2018) of his Egypt Station studio album. Three of the four shows in England occurred in McCartney's hometown, Liverpool.

== Tour dates ==
List of 2018 concerts
Date	City	Country	Venue	Attendance
9 June	Liverpool	England	Philharmonic Dining Rooms	
23 July	London	England	Abbey Road Studios	
25 July	Liverpool	England	Liverpool Institute for Performing Arts	
26 July	Liverpool	England	The Cavern Club	175
7 September	New York City	United States	Grand Central Terminal's Vanderbilt Hall	

== See also ==
- List of Paul McCartney concert tours
