= The Why Store =

American rock band

- Also known as: Emerald City
- Origin: Muncie, Indiana, United States
- Genre: Rock
- Years active: c. 1988–2000, 2005, 2007–present
- Label: MCA Records
- Members: Dan Hunt; Charlie Bushor; Troy Seele; Chris Shaffer
- Website: www.thewhystore.com

The Why Store is an American rock band formed in the late 1980s in Muncie, Indiana when bassist Greg Gardner and guitarist Michael David Smith, both Ball State University students, met up with Indianapolis drummer (Graig) Omar Adams.

== History ==
After being joined a couple of months later by lead singer Chris Shaffer, also a Ball State student, the band played a few gigs as Emerald City. Adams left Emerald City in 1991 and was replaced by drummer Charlie Bushor in 1992. That same year, the band switched to a new name, The Why Store, the name of a former Muncie haberdashery.

In 1993, the band independently recorded Welcome to the Why Store. One year later the band recorded Inside the Why Store. Both albums were huge regional successes, and The Why Store began getting attention from record labels. At this time, touring keyboard player Jeff Pedersen was made an official member of the group, and in 1995 The Why Store signed to MCA's subsidiary Way Cool Music for their first major–label effort, a self–titled LP, which was released in 1996.

The song "Lack of Water", the band's most successful single, received steady airplay on Alternative Radio and reached #1 for two weeks on the Billboard AAA charts. In 1997, The Why Store toured the country opening for John Mellencamp's successful "Mr. Happy Go Lucky" tour, and made an appearance on Late Night with Conan O'Brien. The band released Two Beasts in June 1998, and in 1999 released the double–disc concert set Live at Midnight.

The Why Store split up in 2000 citing creative differences, though each member has continued onto different projects. Chris Shaffer recorded several solo discs as well as recording with his first post-Why Store band, Shaffer Street. Michael David Smith recorded with his new project with Gregory Gardner and Charlie Bushor, Lost in Lodi, releasing the CD "Elvador" in 2001. Jeff Pedersen continued his education, eventually receiving a PhD in Education Curriculum Design and operates Connecting Learning Assures Successful Students as V.P. of Operations.

The band reunited in April 2005 to play a handful of reunions shows, which were well received by fans and critics alike. The band played their last gig together on December 31, 2005, before separating again.

In 2007 Shaffer resurrected the band name, billing his own group first as "Chris Shaffer's Why Store," then simply as "The Why Store" at various venues around the region.

In 2011 Greg Gardner released a solo album under the name "Gregory Shock". Michael David Smith eventually moved to Meridian, Mississippi to take the role of Product Development Manager for Peavey Electronics Corporation's Mississippi division.

Omar Adams now owns and operates a recording studio in Indianapolis called "The Purple Room."

In 2016, Live at The Slippery Noodle was released, featuring six previously unreleased songs.

In 2021, Charlie Bushor rejoined Shaffer in The Why Store, and the band is active playing in the Midwest.

== Members ==
- Chris Shaffer – Lead Vocals/Guitar (1988–present)
- Troy Seele – Lead Guitar (2005–2008, 2015–present)
- Michael David Smith – Guitar (1988–2005)
- Gregory(Gardner) Shock – Bass/Background Vocals (1988–2005)
- Charlie Bushor – Drums (1992–2005, 2021–present)
- Jeff Pedersen – Keyboards (1994–2005)
- (Graigory)Omar Adams- Drummer (1988–1992)
- John Gray- Drums and background vocals (2014–2016)
- Dan Hunt – Bass/Background Vocals (2005–present)
- Benito Dibartoli – Lead Guitar (2007–2010)
- Harvey Moesteller – Lead Guitar (2010–2013)
- Mikie Mo – Merchandise (1992–2005)
- Jerome Rieskamp - Drummer (2005–2014, 2016–2021)
- Deric Rush - Lead Guitar (2008–2009, 2013–2016)

== Discography ==
=== Studio albums ===
- Welcome to the Why Store, 1993
- Inside the Why Store, 1994
- The Why Store, 1996
- Two Beasts, 1998
- Life on Planet Six Ball, 2000
- VIM, 2011
- Mothership, 2024

=== Live albums ===
- Live at Midnight, 1999
- Live at The Slippery Noodle, 2016

=== Singles ===
- Lack Of Water, 1996 (#27 Mainstream Rock Tracks, #37 Alternative Rock Tracks, #1 Triple-A) (#9 Canada, POP [RPM Chart]
- Father, 1996 (#32 Mainstream Rock Tracks)
