= Chris Shaffer =

American singer-songwriter

- Origin: United States
- Genres: Indie rock
- Years active: 2000 – Present
- Member of: The Why Store

Chris Shaffer is a singer/songwriter from Indiana who is best known as the frontman of The Why Store and their biggest single, "Lack of Water." Shaffer performed with The Why Store until it split in 2000 and was among the members who reunited in 2005 for a handful of reunion shows.

Shaffer has remained continuously active in the Indiana music scene. After The Why Store disbanded in 2000, Shaffer continued writing and performing new music. His first project, Shaffer Street, included his then wife, Heather Marie Shaffer, who contributed vocals and songwriting. After a number of incarnations, Shaffer eventually began to simply use only the name "Chris Shaffer." Since 2007, Shaffer has fronted a new band named The Why Store, though it features no other original members.

== Discography ==
=== with The Why Store ===
- Welcome To The Why Store, 1993
- Inside The Why Store, 1994
- The Why Store, 1996
- Two Beasts, 1998
- Live At Midnight, 1999
- Life On Planet Six Ball, 2000
- Vim, 2007
- Vim, 2009
- LIVE At The Slippery Noodle, 2016

=== with Shaffer Street ===
- Four Walls, 2000
- No Way Back, 2002

=== Solo ===
- Chris Shaffer, 2003

== Members ==
- Chris Shaffer: Lead Vocalist, Guitar
- Troy Seele: Guitar
- Dan Hunt: Bass
- Charlie Bushor: Drums
