= Egypt Station =

Studio album by Paul McCartney
- Released: 7 September 2018
- Recorded: January 2016 – February 2018
- Studios: Henson Recording Studios, Los Angeles; Patriot Studios, Los Angeles; Uno Mas, Brentwood; Abbey Road Studios, London; Hogg Hill Mill, Icklesham; KLB Studios, Sao Paulo; Emmanuel Presbyterian Church, Los Angeles
- Genre: Rock
- Length: 57:30
- Label: Capitol
- Producers: Greg Kurstin; Paul McCartney; Ryan Tedder (on "Fuh You")

Paul McCartney chronology
Pure McCartney (2016)	Egypt Station (2018)	Wings 1971–73 (2018)

Paul McCartney studio album chronology
New (2013)	Egypt Station (2018)	McCartney III (2020)

Singles from Egypt Station
- 1. "I Don't Know / Come On to Me" Released: 20 June 2018; 2. "Fuh You" Released: 15 August 2018; 3. "Who Cares" Released: 17 December 2018; 4. "Nothing for Free" Released: July 1, 2019

Egypt Station is the eighteenth solo studio album by the English singer-songwriter Paul McCartney, released on 7 September 2018 through Capitol Records.

Egypt Station was produced by Greg Kurstin and co-produced by McCartney, with the exception of one track produced by Ryan Tedder. The album is McCartney's first studio release since 2013's New. The album's lead single, a double A-side consisting of the songs "I Don't Know" and "Come On to Me", was released on 20 June 2018.

The name "Egypt Station" is shared by one of McCartney's paintings from 1988, from which the cover art is derived. It became his first number one album in the United States since 1982's Tug of War and his first to debut atop the Billboard 200.

== Recording ==
Egypt Station was recorded in studios in Los Angeles, London, São Paulo, and Sussex. McCartney began working with producer Greg Kurstin some time after the release of his 2013 album New and mentioned their working together several times leading up to the 20 June 2018 announcement of Egypt Station's release.

McCartney also wrote and recorded three songs with Ryan Tedder. One of the songs, "Fuh You", was released on the standard edition album. "Nothing for Free" was released on the Traveller's and Explorer's editions of the album. The song "Get Enough" was also recorded with Tedder for the album, but was instead released New Year's Day 2019 as a non-album single.

The song "Back in Brazil" was recorded at KLB Studios in the city of São Paulo.

== Composition ==
Egypt Station contains 16 tracks, including opening and penultimate ambient pieces entitled "Opening Station" and "Station II", respectively. Tracks include the singles "I Don't Know" and "Come On to Me". "Happy with You" is described as "acoustic meditation on present day contentedness", "People Want Peace" is called a "timeless anthem that would fit on virtually any album of any McCartney era", and "Despite Repeated Warnings" is called "an epic multi-movement closer".

On the inspiration for the album's title and theme, McCartney said:

I liked the words 'Egypt Station'. It reminded me of the 'album' albums we used to make. ... 'Egypt Station' starts off at the station on the first song, and then each song is like a different station. So it gave us some idea to base all the songs around that. I think of it as a dream location that the music emanates from.

In the promotional event "Casual Conversation", McCartney further clarified his creative process behind recording Egypt Station and described it as a loose concept album.

== Promotion ==
On 10 June 2018, all content was removed from McCartney's Instagram page. That day, all of McCartney's social media pages began posting cryptic photos of symbols and McCartney playing various instruments, fueling speculation of an impending announcement. The title Egypt Station was first announced on 18 June 2018, McCartney's 76th birthday. One day later, McCartney officially announced the release of the album's first (double A-side) single, consisting of the two songs "I Don't Know" and "Come On to Me". The two songs were released on 20 June 2018. The same day, McCartney's website officially announced the title and release date of Egypt Station, also providing information on the album's recording and creative process.

McCartney agreed to film a "Carpool Karaoke" segment for The Late Late Show with James Corden in Liverpool on 9 June 2018. As part of the segment, McCartney played a small gig at Liverpool's Philharmonic Dining Rooms, where he performed "Come On to Me" live for the first time. The segment was broadcast the week of 17 June 2018 in conjunction with the release of the album's first single. An extended version of the segment, titled "When Corden Met McCartney (Live from Liverpool)", was broadcast by CBS on 20 August 2018.

On 3 July 2018, the Freshen Up tour was announced through the official McCartney website. The tour started on 17 September 2018 in Quebec City, Canada.

On 19 July 2018, McCartney posted an image on his Instagram asking fans, "Why do you think you should attend a secret event in London with Paul next week"? Fans were asked to "post a short video using the hashtag #UnderTheStaircase". The winners of the contest were treated to a secret concert at Abbey Road Studios with a number of other celebrity guests in attendance. The set list included four songs from the upcoming album, including "Come On to Me" and the live debuts of "Confidante", "Fuh You", and a song that had been previously unmentioned, called "Who Cares". Later the same week, McCartney played a surprise concert at The Cavern Club in Liverpool.

On 25 July 2018, McCartney held a talk titled "Casual Conversation" at the Liverpool Institute for Performing Arts (LIPA). Moderated by Jarvis Cocker, the event was live-streamed on Facebook, and he answered questions from LIPA students as well as viewers online.

On 15 August 2018, McCartney released "Fuh You" as the second single from the album. On 3 September 2018, McCartney's YouTube channel released a series of videos titled "Egypt Station – Words Between the Tracks". The videos feature McCartney briefly describing the composition and inspiration of each track from the standard edition album.

On 7 September 2018, to celebrate the launch of the album, McCartney performed a "secret" concert at Grand Central Terminal that was live-streamed on YouTube. Music only videos of each performance were later uploaded to his YouTube channel.

During the lead-up promotion to the album's release date, lyric videos were released on YouTube for the first singles "Come On To Me", "I Don't Know", and "Fuh You". Since Egypt Station's release, official music videos were released for "Fuh You", "Back In Brazil" and "Come On To Me". The music videos are a creative departure from many of McCartney's previous music videos in that they each focus on the lives of ordinary people with McCartney only appearing briefly (on stage) in the conclusion of "Back In Brazil".

== Critical reception ==
Professional ratings
Aggregate scores
Source	Rating
Metacritic	74/100
Review scores
Source	Rating
AllMusic	3.5/5 stars
Consequence of Sound	B−
The Daily Telegraph	4/5 stars
The Guardian	4/5 stars
musicOMH	4/5 stars
NME	4/5 stars
The Observer	4/5 stars
Pitchfork	5.8/10
Rolling Stone	4/5 stars
Slant Magazine	2.5/5 stars

Egypt Station has been well received by music critics. On Metacritic, the album has an overall score of 74 out of 100 compiled from the scores of 25 music critics, indicating "generally favourable reviews".

In the review for AllMusic, Stephen Thomas Erlewine opined that "all the slower songs are peppered with haunting images of darkness creeping at the edges, while McCartney revives the carnality that marked Press – not just on the straightforward 'Fuh You,' but 'Come on to Me,' a considerably better song than the Tedder exercise. Such twists are welcome, but what's satisfying about Egypt Station is what's always satisfying about a McCartney record: the hooks and imagination that are so rampant they seem effortless." Dan Stubbs from NME gave the album 4 out of 5 stars, saying, "McCartney’s always been about inclusivity and openness, but this latest glimpse into his life feels like a particularly enlightening one." Reviewing the album for The Observer, Kitty Empire also gave the album 4 out of 5 stars. In the review she states that "the finest songs here land immediately and hum with urgency."

Writing a four-star review in Rolling Stone, Rob Sheffield claimed, "Make a list of all the songwriters who were composing great tunes in 1958. Now make an overlapping list of the ones who are still writing brilliant songs in 2018. Your list reads: Paul McCartney." Chris Willman at Variety stated, "If it doesn't make for McCartney's most coherent collection, it's endearing how enthusiastically he strives, at 76, to avoid doing just one thing when he can do a dozen. Bitch, he's Macca."

In 2019, Egypt Station was nominated for the Fryderyk Music Award (in Poland) for the best foreign album of 2018, but did not win, losing the award to Anthem of the Peaceful Army by Greta Van Fleet.

== Commercial performance ==
Egypt Station debuted at number one on the US Billboard 200 in the issue dated 22 September 2018, earning 153,000 album equivalent units (of which 147,000 were pure album sales). It is McCartney's first US number one album since Tug of War in 1982, as well as his eighth number one album overall and his first to debut atop the chart. The album dropped to number eight in its second week, earning an additional 37,000 album-equivalent units in the United States.

== Track listing ==
All tracks produced by Greg Kurstin and McCartney, except "Fuh You" by Ryan Tedder and McCartney, "Nothing for Free" and "Get Enough" by Ryan Tedder, Zach Skelton and McCartney.

All tracks are written by Paul McCartney, except where noted.

Egypt Station track listing
No.	Title	Writer(s)	Length
1.	"Opening Station"		0:42
2.	"I Don't Know"		4:27
3.	"Come On to Me"		4:11
4.	"Happy with You"		3:34
5.	"Who Cares"		3:13
6.	"Fuh You"	McCartney; Ryan Tedder	3:23
7.	"Confidante"		3:04
8.	"People Want Peace"		2:59
9.	"Hand in Hand"		2:35
10.	"Dominoes"		5:02
11.	"Back in Brazil"		3:21
12.	"Do It Now"		3:17
13.	"Caesar Rock"		3:29
14.	"Despite Repeated Warnings"		6:58
15.	"Station II"		0:46
16.	"Hunt You Down/Naked/C-Link"		6:22
Total length:			57:30

Egypt Station – Target edition / Japanese edition / European edition bonus tracks
No.	Title	Writer(s)	Length
17.	"Get Started"		3:41
18.	"Nothing for Free" (feat. Ryan Tedder)	McCartney; Tedder	3:15
Total length:			64:26

Egypt Station II — "Traveller's Edition" / "Explorer's Edition" (Disc 2)
No.	Title	Writer(s)	Length
1.	"Get Started"		3:41
2.	"Nothing for Free" (feat. Ryan Tedder)	McCartney; Tedder	3:15
3.	"Frank Sinatra's Party"		2:44
4.	"Sixty Second Street"		3:57
5.	"Who Cares" (full length)		5:33
6.	"Get Enough"	McCartney; Tedder; Zach Skelton	2:58
7.	"Come On to Me" (live at Abbey Road Studios)		4:19
8.	"Fuh You" (live at The Cavern Club)		3:35
9.	"Confidante" (live at LIPA)		3:16
10.	"Who Cares" (live at Grand Central Station)		3:02
Total length:			36:20

== Personnel ==
- Paul McCartney – lead and backing vocals (2–14, 16), acoustic guitar (2–5, 7–14, 16), keyboards (2–4, 6–14, 16), bass guitar (2, 4–8, 10–14, 16), percussion (2, 3, 8, 10, 11, 13, 14, 16), drums (2, 8, 10, 12–14, 16), electric guitar (3, 8, 10, 11, 14, 16), harmonica (3), tape loops (10), co-production

with

- Greg Kurstin – production, engineering, arrangements, keyboards (2, 4, 8, 11, 14), electric guitar (2, 3), mellotron (2), percussion (3, 12), backing vocal (8), marimba (10), sound effects (11), vibraphone (16)
- Rob Millett – cimbalom (2, 4, 10)
- Wix Wickens – keyboards (3, 5, 13, 14)
- Abe Laboriel Jr. – drums (3, 5, 11, 13, 14), percussion (4, 12, 16), tack piano (4), backing vocals (5, 11–14, 16)
- Rusty Anderson – electric guitar (3, 5, 12–14, 16), backing vocals (5, 12–14, 16), acoustic guitar (14)
- Brian Ray – electric guitar (3, 5, 13, 14, 16), bass guitar (3), backing vocals (5, 13, 14, 16), acoustic guitar (14)
- Tim Loo – cello (3, 16)
- Greg Phillinganes – piano (3)
- Pedro Eustache – flute (4, 9, 11), duduk (11)
- Ryan Tedder – backing vocals (6), programming (6), co-production (6)
- Zach Skelton – programming (6), co-production (6)
- Inara George, Alex Pasco, Matt Tuggle, Collin Kadlec – backing vocals (8)
- Vanessa Freebairn-Smith – cello (8, 9)
- Jodi Burnett – cello (9)
- Jamie Hovorka, Kye Palmer, Tony Guerrero – trumpets (14)
- Caroline Le'gene, Roy Bennett – backing vocals (13)
- Julian Burg – backing vocal (8), engineering
- Session musicians – orchestration and choir (1–4, 6, 11, 12, 14–16)
- Mark "Spike" Stent – mixing
- Steve Orchard, Mauricio Cersosimo, Al Schmitt, Billy Bush, Rich Rich, Alex Pasco – engineering

== Charts ==
=== Weekly charts ===
Weekly chart performance for Egypt Station
Chart (2018)	Peak position
Australian Albums (ARIA)	4
Austrian Albums (Ö3 Austria)	2
Belgian Albums (Ultratop Flanders)	2
Belgian Albums (Ultratop Wallonia)	3
Canadian Albums (Billboard)	3
Czech Albums (ČNS IFPI)	3
Danish Albums (Hitlisten)	7
Dutch Albums (Album Top 100)	2
Finnish Albums (Suomen virallinen lista)	45
French Albums (SNEP)	4
German Albums (Offizielle Top 100)	1
Hungarian Albums (MAHASZ)	22
Irish Albums (IRMA)	7
Italian Albums (FIMI)	5
Japan Hot Albums (Billboard Japan)	4
Japanese Albums (Oricon)	6
Japanese International Albums (Oricon)	1
New Zealand Albums (RMNZ)	12
Norwegian Albums (VG-lista)	3
Polish Albums (ZPAV)	15
Portuguese Albums (AFP)	8
Scottish Albums (Official Charts)	1
Slovak Albums (ČNS IFPI)	12
Spanish Albums (Promusicae)	2
Swedish Albums (Sverigetopplistan)	4
Swiss Albums (Schweizer Hitparade)	5
UK Albums (Official Charts)	3
US Billboard 200	1
US Top Rock Albums (Billboard)	1
US Indie Store Album Sales (Billboard)	1

=== Year-end charts ===
2018 year-end chart performance for Egypt Station
Chart (2018)	Position
Belgian Albums (Ultratop Flanders)	71
Belgian Albums (Ultratop Wallonia)	57
Dutch Albums (MegaCharts)	97
French Albums (SNEP)	170
German Albums (Offizielle Top 100)	49
Swiss Albums (Schweizer Hitparade)	85
US Billboard 200	175
US Top Rock Albums (Billboard)	33

2019 year-end chart performance for Egypt Station
Chart (2019)	Position
US Top Rock Albums (Billboard)	78

== Certifications ==
Certifications for Egypt Station
Region	Certification	Certified units/sales
France (SNEP)	Gold	50,000^{‡}
^{‡} Sales+streaming figures based on certification alone.
