= Fuh You =

Single by Paul McCartney

from the album Egypt Station
- Released: 15 August 2018
- Recorded: January 2016 – February 2018
- Studio: Patriot, Los Angeles; Hogg Hill Mill, Icklesham; Uno Mas, Brentwood
- Genre: Pop
- Length: 3:25
- Label: Capitol
- Songwriters: Paul McCartney; Ryan Tedder
- Producers: Paul McCartney; Ryan Tedder

Paul McCartney singles chronology
"I Don't Know" / "Come On to Me" (2018)	"Fuh You" (2018)	"Who Cares" (2018)

"Fuh You" is a song by the English musician Paul McCartney that was released as the second single from the album Egypt Station on 15 August 2018.

== Background, composition, and recording ==
The song was one of several co-written and produced with Ryan Tedder but the only one to make it on the album. Other songs from this collaboration included "Nothing for Free", which was released as a bonus track on the album's deluxe edition, and "Get Enough", which was released as a single in 2019. On writing the song and working with Tedder, McCartney said:

So out of all the producers that were suggested, I liked Ryan, rung him up and we chatted. He said, "What do you hope to get [out of this]?" I was like, "Oh I don't know." And then I thought, "Come on Paul, don't be so shy." So I said, "A hit?" And he was like, "Yeah! Now you're talking my language! The world loves a hit!" So that was our brief. To do something commercial. In a week, we ended up with three songs and one of them was "Fuh You".

The title of the song is wordplay, making "For You" sound like "Fuck You". This came about during the recording when McCartney sang "I just wanna shag you" in the song's chorus as a joke. Amused, he decided to make it questionable whether the listener could hear the words "for you" or "fuck you" in the finished song. McCartney had previously used wordplay for sexual suggestiveness multiple times; during his time in the Beatles, songs like "Girl" and "Day Tripper" (though these lyrics were penned by Lennon) featured similar wordplay. In 1972, his band Wings released the single "Hi, Hi, Hi", which contained similarly suggestive lyrics which led to the song being banned by the BBC.

McCartney said of this wordplay, "And then you do 'Why Don't We Do It in the Road?', 'Tit-tit-tit-tit-tit-tit.' [...] 'She's a prick teaser.' It's kind of pathetic, but actually a great thing in its pathos because it's something that makes you laugh. So what's wrong with that?"

== Release ==
The song was issued on 15 August 2018 to promote McCartney's album Egypt Station. The song was released on streaming services, and a lyric video was uploaded to YouTube. On 10 September, a music video was uploaded to YouTube to promote the single. According to Rolling Stone magazine, "The black-and-white video opens with a teenage couple sharing a kiss on a front doorstep before the girl's mother intrudes and sends the boy home. The enamored young protagonist then wanders the streets of Liverpool, singing and dancing along with 'Fuh You' as he makes his way home."

== Critical reception ==
Despite positive reviews for Egypt Station, "Fuh You" received largely negative responses from music critics. In a review of the album, Pitchfork wrote, "Where 'FourFiveSeconds' benefitted from minimalism, 'Fuh You' is a maximalist jumble of modernist nonsense in which producer Ryan Tedder forces Paul to follow his playbook". The Guardian wrote: "...there is still something depressing about a Paul McCartney song that sounds as if it was assembled on a latter day pop production line. Not least because it doesn't sound like the kind of undeniable smash that latter day pop production lines occasionally come up with, but the stuff they palm off to pad out albums."

== Personnel ==
- Paul McCartney – lead vocals, bass guitar, harpsichord, piano, acoustic guitar, Wurlitzer
- Ryan Tedder – backing vocals, programming
- David Angell – violin
- Alicia Enstrom – violin
- Betsy Lamb – viola
- Paul Nelson – cello
- Jack Jezzro – string bass
- Brandon Michael Collins – strings arrangement, strings producer

== Charts ==
Chart (2018)	Peak position
Belgium (Ultratip Bubbling Under Flanders)	19
Belgium (Ultratip Bubbling Under Wallonia)	7
Russia (Tophit)	4
US Hot Rock & Alternative Songs (Billboard)	37
