= Abe Laboriel Jr. =

American drummer (born 1971)

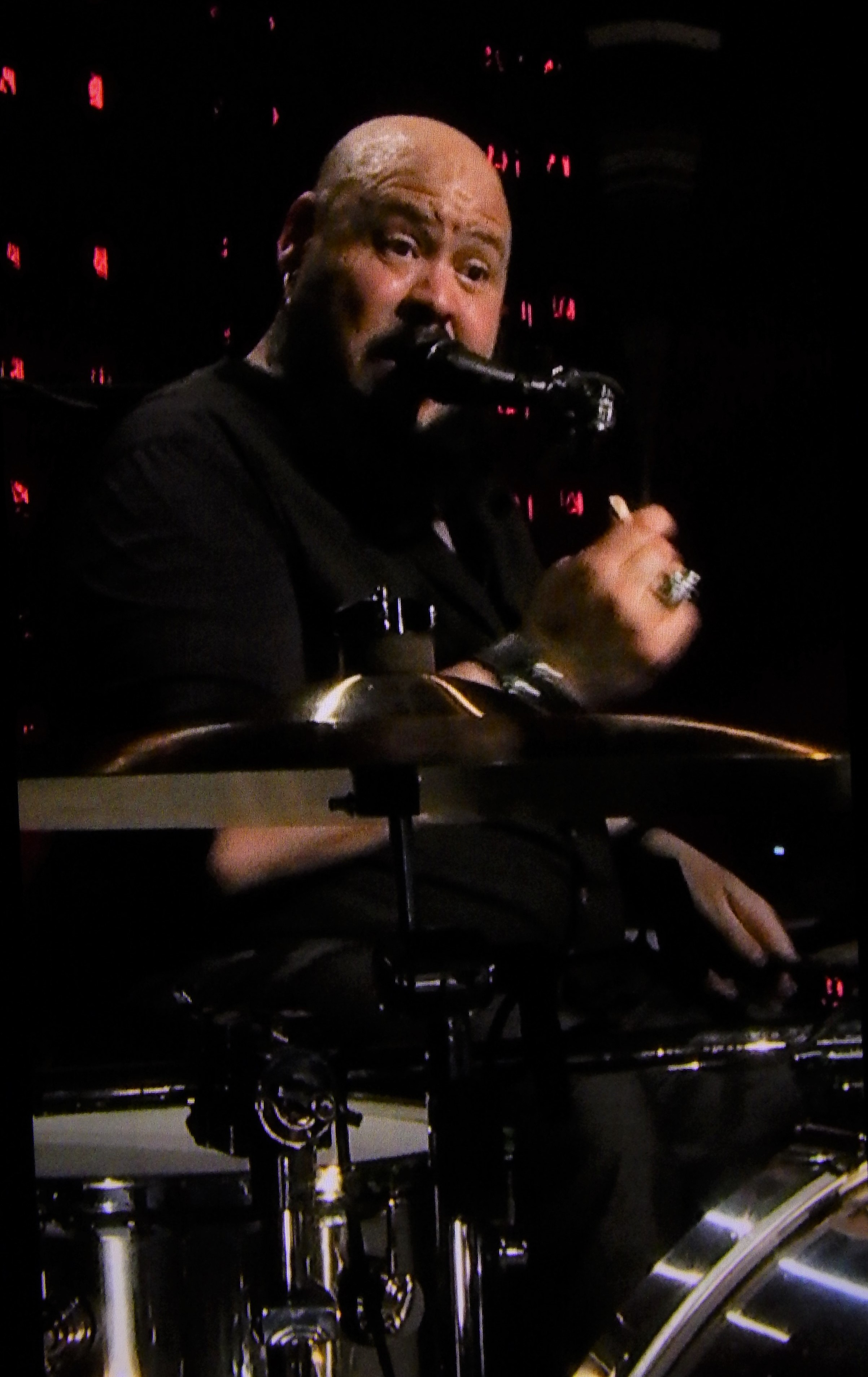
- Playing as sideman with Paul McCartney, 2019

Background information
- Born: Abraham Laboriel Jr. March 23, 1971 (age 55)
- Origin: Boston, Massachusetts, U.S.
- Genres: Rock; pop
- Occupation: Drummer
- Years active: 1980s–present

Abraham Laboriel Jr. (born March 23, 1971) is an American musician who is best known as the drummer and backing vocalist of Paul McCartney's touring band since 2001.

He is the son of Mexican bass guitarist Abraham Laboriel, nephew of rock musician Johnny Laboriel, and brother of record producer, songwriter and film composer Mateo Laboriel.

== Early life ==
The son of jazz bass player Abraham Laboriel, Abe grew up playing drums starting at age four. His mother is a classically trained singer.

Laboriel was mentored by well-known percussionists and drummers, including Jeff Porcaro, Chester Thompson, along with Bill Maxwell and Alex Acuña, who had formed the band Koinonia with his father in the 1980s.

He attended the Dick Grove School of Music, studying with Peter Donald, during his junior year in high school. He also attended the Hamilton High School Academy of Music in Los Angeles in his senior year. Here he first experienced the use of programming and became a member of a marching band. He formed a jazz trio with Vernell Brown and Mike Elizondo. In 1989, he was honored by the National Foundation for Advancement in the Arts and Down Beat magazine. He then enrolled at the Berklee College of Music, where he graduated in 1993.

== Career ==
Laboriel's first break as a drummer was a tour with guitarist Steve Vai. He then toured with Seal, where he was seen by record producers around Los Angeles which led to session work. Laboriel next toured with k.d. lang where Sting saw him and invited Laboriel to join Sting's touring band. He also toured and recorded in studio with former Menudo member Robi Draco Rosa on his album Vagabundo.

Laboriel has also recorded and performed with Fiona Apple, Jonatha Brooke, Crystal Lewis, Shakira, B.B. King, Pearl Jam, Steven Curtis Chapman, Eric Clapton, Johnny Hallyday, Jenifer, Steve Winwood, Les Paul, Ashlee Simpson, LeAnn Rimes, Mylène Farmer, Letters to Cleo, Vanessa Carlton, Kelly Clarkson, David Tao, Lady Gaga, Tyler Bryant, Steve Lukather, Jerry Cantrell and others. Lewis and Laboriel were also both a part of the Nickelodeon television series, Roundhouse in the 1990s.

For his 2001 album, Driving Rain, Paul McCartney told producer David Kahne he wanted to return to the spontaneity he remembered when working with The Beatles. He recalled that his bandmates and producer would often be hearing the songs he had written for the first time at the start of the recording session, having had no time to learn or rehearse. McCartney felt this made the recordings sound "fresh," and told Kahne he wanted to record this album the same way. To achieve this, Kahne assembled a band of session musicians, Laboriel included, who had never met McCartney until their first day in the studio together. Laboriel has been part of McCartney's recording and touring band ever since.

Laboriel was part of a power trio called The Raging Honkies, together with Michael Landau. He is part of the collective that is Chocolate Genius, Inc.

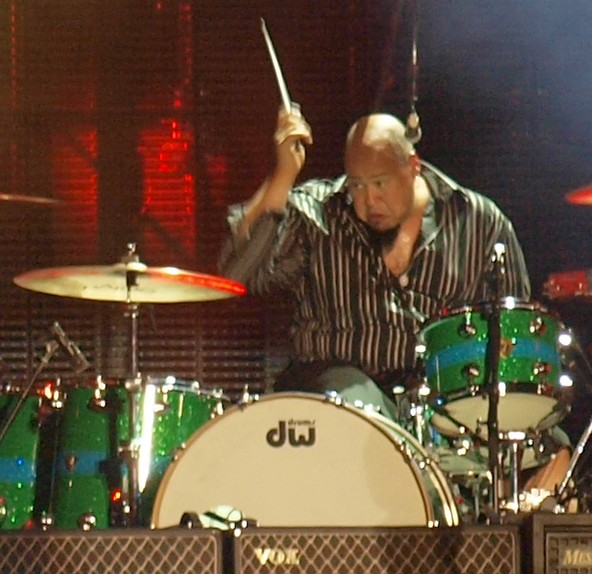
Laboriel performing in 2008

In 2006 during the show "Avant que l'ombre... à Bercy" ("Before the shadow... at Bercy"), Laboriel sang a duet "Les Mots" ("The words") with Mylène Farmer. He also played with Sting at the Montreux Jazz Festival that year. Laboriel toured with Eric Clapton and Steve Winwood on their 14-date American Tour in 2009 following their Japanese tour the year before. He made his live debut with Paul McCartney at The Concert for New York City in 2001, and has played on every McCartney tour since then.

In addition to drums, Laboriel also sings and plays bass, guitar and keyboards. When touring with McCartney, he will occasionally switch to one of these instruments to accommodate certain songs and on his 2013 solo album Naked, he played every instrument.

In 2021, Laboriel played drums on Jerry Cantrell's album Brighten. In 2022, he contributed drums and percussion to "Mrs. Mills" on the solo album Earthling from Pearl Jam singer Eddie Vedder.

In 2026, Laboriel was announced as the new drummer for Pearl Jam.

== Style ==
About his playing, Laboriel noted: "As much as I would love to say I have an original sound, I think the truth is I have an original filter. I'd listen so much and so hard to so many different people that what's original about me is not necessarily what I play but how I play it, how I interpret it hasn't already been done. It's more about the energy and the intensity, it's not about the specific fills, it's more about the intention."

== Equipment ==
Laboriel endorses Drum Workshop drums, Paiste cymbals, Remo drumheads and Vic Firth drumsticks.

DW Collector's series drums:

- 26x14" or 28x20" kick drum
- 14x10" or 15x12" rack tom
- 16x14" or 18x16" floor tom
- 18x16" or 20x16" floor tom
- 14x7" or 14x8" snare drum

Paiste cymbals:

- 15" 2002 Sound Edge Hi Hats
- 20" 2002 Crash
- 22" 2002 Crash
- 24" 2002 Ride
- 24" Giant Beat Crash
- 24" 2002 Crash

Laboriel has his own signature Vic Firth drumstick which is similar to a regular 2B wood tip drumstick but in 17" length.
