= List of awards and nominations received by Paul McCartney =

Sir Paul McCartney awards and nominations
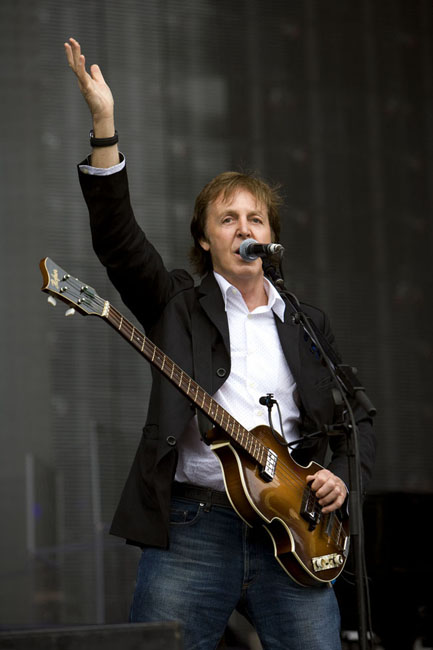
- McCartney performing in 2000
Awards and nominations
Award	Wins	Nominations
Academy Awards	1	3
Emmy Awards	1	3
Golden Globes	0	3
Grammy Awards	19	86

Totals (Note: Certain award groups do not simply award one winner. They acknowledge several different recipients, have runners-up, and have third place. Since this is a specific recognition and is different from losing an award, runner-up mentions are considered wins in this award tally. For simplification and to avoid errors, each award in this list has been presumed to have had a prior nomination.)
- Wins: 67
- Nominations: 125

Sir Paul McCartney is an English songwriter, musician and composer. He has received numerous accolades including an Academy Award, 19 Grammy Awards, and a Emmy Award. He was knighted by Queen Elizabeth II in 1997 and was awarded the French Legion of Honour in 2017. He was inducted into the Songwriters Hall of Fame in 1987, the Rock & Roll Hall of Fame in 1999, and honored with the Library of Congress Gershwin Prize for Popular Song and Kennedy Center Honors in 2010, and Rolling Stone listed him as one of the 200 Greatest Singers of All Time.

As a member of The Beatles, his songwriting partnership with John Lennon produced "some of the most popular music in rock and roll history". In 1965, they won the Grammy Award for Best New Artist and Best Performance by a Vocal Group for A Hard Day's Night. They won the Grammy Award for Song of the Year for "Michelle" in 1967 and the Grammy Award for Album of the Year for their eighth studio album Sgt. Pepper's Lonely Hearts Club Band in 1968. They won the Grammy Award for Best Score Soundtrack for Visual Media for Let It Be in 1971.

As a member of Wings, he won the Grammy Award for Best Pop Performance by a Duo or Group with Vocals for "Band on the Run" in 1975 and the Grammy Award for Best Rock Instrumental Performance for "Rockestra Theme" in 1980. As a solo artist, he won Grammy Awards for Best Traditional Pop Vocal Album for Kisses on the Bottom in 2013, and the Best Rock Song for "Cut Me Some Slack" in 2014.

For film, as part of the Beatles, he won the Academy Award for Best Original Score for Let It Be from the 1970 film of the same name. He was further Oscar-nominated for Live and Let Die from the 1973 film of the same name and Vanilla Sky from the 2001 film of the same name. He received three nominations for the Golden Globe Award for Best Original Song for "No More Lonely Nights" from Give My Regards to Broad Street (1984), "Vanilla Sky" from the 2001 film of the same name, and "(I Want to) Come Home" from Everybody's Fine (2009).

On television, he won the Primetime Emmy Award for Outstanding Documentary or Nonfiction Series for Disney+ documentary miniseries The Beatles: Get Back (2021). He was previously Emmy-nominated for Outstanding Classical Music-Dance Program for Paul McCartney's Standing Stone (1989) and Outstanding Variety, Music or Comedy Special for the concert special Paul McCartney in Red Square (2005).

In addition to his 19 Grammy wins, McCartney received the academy's MusiCares Person of the Year award in 2012. McCartney was honoured with a Grammy Lifetime Achievement Award twice. The first in 1990 for his solo work and then with The Beatles in 2014. The Beatles were also honoured with a Grammy Trustees Award in 1972. McCartney has also received eight BRIT Awards, two American Music Awards, one Classical Brit Awards, one Critics' Choice Movie Award, one MTV Video Music Award, and one MTV Europe Music Award.

== Major associations ==
=== Academy Awards ===
Year	Category	Nominated work	Result	Ref.
1971	Best Original or Adaptation Score	Let It Be (from Let It Be)	Won	
1974	Best Original Song	"Live and Let Die" (from Live and Let Die)	Nominated	
2002	Best Original Song	"Vanilla Sky" (from Vanilla Sky)	Nominated	

=== BAFTA Awards ===
Year	Category	Nominated work	Result	Ref.
British Academy Film Awards
1964	Most Promising Newcomer to Leading Film Roles	A Hard Day's Night	Nominated	
1985	Best Original Song	"No More Lonely Nights"	Nominated	

=== Critics' Choice Awards ===
Year	Category	Nominated work	Result	Ref.
Critics' Choice Movie Awards
2001	Best Song	"Vanilla Sky" (from Vanilla Sky)	Won	
2009	Best Song	"(I Want to) Come Home" (from Everybody's Fine)	Nominated	

=== Emmy Awards ===
Year	Category	Nominated work	Result	Ref.
Primetime Emmy Awards
1998	Outstanding Classical Music-Dance Program	Paul McCartney's Standing Stone	Nominated	
2006	Outstanding Variety, Music or Comedy Special	McCartney in St. Petersburg	Nominated	
2022	Outstanding Documentary or Nonfiction Series	The Beatles: Get Back	Won	

=== Golden Globe Awards ===
Year	Category	Nominated work	Result	Ref.
1985	Best Original Song	"No More Lonely Nights"	Nominated	
2002	Best Original Song	"Vanilla Sky"	Nominated	
2010	Best Original Song	"(I Want to) Come Home"	Nominated	

=== Grammy Awards ===
Year	Category	Nominated work	Result	Ref.
1965	Record of the Year	"I Want to Hold Your Hand"	Nominated	
1965	Song of the Year	"A Hard Day's Night"	Nominated	
1965	Best New Artist	The Beatles	Won	
1965	Best Performance by a Vocal Group	A Hard Day's Night	Won	
1965	Best Rock & Roll Recording	A Hard Day's Night	Nominated	
1965	Best Score Soundtrack for Visual Media	A Hard Day's Night	Nominated	
1966	Album of the Year	Help!	Nominated	
1966	Best Performance by a Vocal Group Performance	Help!	Nominated	
1966	Best Contemporary (R&R) Performance	Help!	Nominated	
1966	Best Score Soundtrack for Visual Media	Help!	Nominated	
1966	Record of the Year	"Yesterday"	Nominated	
1966	Song of the Year	"Yesterday"	Nominated	
1966	Best Vocal Performance, Male	"Yesterday"	Nominated	
1966	Best Contemporary (R&R) Vocal Performance – Male	"Yesterday"	Nominated	
1966	Best Contemporary (R&R) Single	"Yesterday"	Nominated	
1967	Album of the Year	Revolver	Nominated	
1967	Song of the Year	"Michelle"	Won	
1967	Best Vocal Performance, Male	"Eleanor Rigby"	Nominated	
1967	Best Contemporary (R&R) Performance	"Eleanor Rigby"	Won	
1967	Best Contemporary (R&R) Recording	"Eleanor Rigby"	Nominated	
1968	Album of the Year	Sgt. Pepper's Lonely Hearts Club Band	Won	
1968	Best Contemporary Album	Sgt. Pepper's Lonely Hearts Club Band	Won	
1968	Best Performance by a Vocal Group	Sgt. Pepper's Lonely Hearts Club Band	Nominated	
1968	Best Contemporary (R&R) Performance	Sgt. Pepper's Lonely Hearts Club Band	Nominated	
1968	Best Arrangement, Instrumental and Vocals	"A Day in the Life"	Nominated	
1969	Album of the Year	Magical Mystery Tour	Nominated	
1969	Record of the Year	"Hey Jude"	Nominated	
1969	Song of the Year	"Hey Jude"	Nominated	
1969	Best Pop Performance by a Duo or Group with Vocals	"Hey Jude"	Nominated	
1970	Album of the Year	Abbey Road	Nominated	
1970	Best Contemporary Vocal Performance by a Group	Abbey Road	Nominated	
1970	Best Score Soundtrack for Visual Media	Yellow Submarine	Nominated	
1971	Record of the Year	"Let It Be"	Nominated	
1971	Song of the Year	"Let It Be"	Nominated	
1971	Best Contemporary Song	"Let It Be"	Nominated	
1971	Best Pop Performance by a Duo or Group with Vocals	Let It Be	Nominated	
1971	Best Score Soundtrack for Visual Media	Let It Be	Won	
1972	Best Arrangement Accompanying Vocalist(s)	"Uncle Albert/Admiral Halsey" (with Linda McCartney)	Won	
1974	Best Pop Performance by a Duo or Group with Vocals	"Live and Let Die"	Nominated	
1974	Best Score Soundtrack for Visual Media	Live and Let Die	Nominated	
1975	Album of the Year	Band on the Run	Nominated	
1975	Best Pop Vocal Performance by a Duo, Group or Chorus	"Band on the Run"	Won	
1977	Best Arrangement Accompanying Vocalist(s)	"Let 'Em In"	Nominated	
1980	Best Rock Instrumental Performance	"Rockestra Theme"	Won	
1981	Best Rock Vocal Performance, Male	"Coming Up (Live at the Glasgow)"	Nominated	
1982	Best Spoken Word Album	The McCartney Interview	Nominated	
1983	Album of the Year	Tug of War	Nominated	
1983	Record of the Year	"Ebony and Ivory" (with Stevie Wonder)	Nominated	
1983	Best Pop Performance by a Duo or Group with Vocals	"Ebony and Ivory" (with Stevie Wonder)	Nominated	
1983	Best R&B Performance by a Duo or Group with Vocals	"What's That You're Doing?"	Nominated	
1984	Best Pop Performance by a Duo or Group with Vocals	"The Girl Is Mine" (with Michael Jackson)	Nominated	
1986	Best Music Video, Short Form	"Do They Know It's Christmas?" (as featured artist)	Nominated	
1987	Best Music Video, Short Form	"Rupert and the Frog Song"	Nominated	
1996	Best Historical Album	Live at the BBC	Nominated	
1997	Best Long Form Music Video	The Beatles Anthology	Won	
1997	Best Pop Performance by a Duo or Group with Vocals	"Free as a Bird"	Won	
1997	Best Short Form Music Video	"Free as a Bird"	Won	
1998	Album of the Year	Flaming Pie	Nominated	
2001	Best Alternative Music Album	Liverpool Sound Collage	Nominated	
2003	Best Song Written for Visual Media	"Vanilla Sky" (from Vanilla Sky)	Nominated	
2005	Best Pop Collaboration with Vocals	"Something" (with Eric Clapton)	Nominated	
2006	Album of the Year	Chaos and Creation in the Backyard	Nominated	
2006	Best Pop Vocal Album	Chaos and Creation in the Backyard	Nominated	
2006	Best Male Pop Vocal Performance	"Fine Line"	Nominated	
2007	Best Male Pop Vocal Performance	"Jenny Wren"	Nominated	
2008	Best Pop Vocal Album	Memory Almost Full	Nominated	
2008	Best Male Pop Vocal Performance	"Dance Tonight"	Nominated	
2008	Best Solo Rock Vocal Performance	"Only Mama Knows"	Nominated	
2009	Best Male Pop Vocal Performance	"That Was Me"	Nominated	
2009	Best Solo Rock Vocal Performance	"I Saw Her Standing There"	Nominated	
2011	Best Solo Rock Vocal Performance	"Helter Skelter" (from Good Evening New York City)	Won	
2012	Best Historical Album	Band on the Run (Paul McCartney Archive Collection)	Won	
2013	Best Traditional Pop Vocal Album	Kisses on the Bottom	Won	
2014	Best Rock Song	"Cut Me Some Slack" (Note: (with Dave Grohl, Pat Smear and Krist Novoselic))	Won	
2014	Best Music Film	Live Kisses	Won	
2014	Best Historical Album	Ram (Paul McCartney Archive Collection)	Nominated	
2016	Best Rap Performance	"All Day" (Note: (with Kanye West, Theophilus London and Allan Kingdom))	Nominated	
2016	Best Rap Song	"All Day"	Nominated	
2017	Best Boxed Or Special Limited Edition Package	Tug of War (Paul McCartney Archive Collection)	Nominated	
2021	Best Boxed Or Special Limited Edition Package	Flaming Pie (Collector's Edition)	Nominated	
2022	Best Rock Song	"Find My Way"	Nominated	
2022	Best Rock Album	McCartney III	Nominated	
2025	Record of the Year	"Now and Then"	Nominated	
2025	Best Rock Performance	"Now and Then"	Won	
2027	Best Traditional Pop Vocal Album	The Boys of Dungeon Lane	Pending	
2027	Best Music Film	Man on the Run	Pending	
2027	Best Audio Book, Narration & Storytelling Recording	The Man on the Run	Pending	
Grammy Trustees Award
1972	Trustees Award	The Beatles	Honored	
Grammy Lifetime Achievement Award
1990	Lifetime Achievement Award	Paul McCartney	Honored	
2014	Lifetime Achievement Award	The Beatles	Honored	
Grammy Hall of Fame
1993	Hall of Fame (The Beatles)	Sgt. Pepper's Lonely Hearts Club Band	Inducted	
1995	Hall of Fame (The Beatles)	Abbey Road	Inducted	
1997	Hall of Fame (The Beatles)	"Yesterday"	Inducted	
1998	Hall of Fame (The Beatles)	"I Want to Hold Your Hand"	Inducted	
1999	Hall of Fame (The Beatles)	Revolver	Inducted	
1999	Hall of Fame (The Beatles)	"Strawberry Fields Forever"	Inducted	
2000	Hall of Fame (The Beatles)	Rubber Soul	Inducted	
2000	Hall of Fame (The Beatles)	A Hard Day's Night	Inducted	
2000	Hall of Fame (The Beatles)	The Beatles (White Album)	Inducted	
2001	Hall of Fame (The Beatles)	"Hey Jude"	Inducted	
2001	Hall of Fame (The Beatles)	Meet the Beatles!	Inducted	
2002	Hall of Fame (The Beatles)	"Eleanor Rigby"	Inducted	
2004	Hall of Fame (The Beatles)	"Let It Be"	Inducted	
2008	Hall of Fame (The Beatles)	"Help!"	Inducted	
2011	Hall of Fame (The Beatles)	"Penny Lane"	Inducted	
2013	Hall of Fame (Wings)	Band on the Run	Inducted	

== Miscellaneous awards ==
Organizations	Year	Category	Work	Result	Ref.
American Music Awards	1975	Favorite Pop/Rock Band/Duo/Group	Wings	Nominated	(Note: Numerous sources here:)
American Music Awards	1983	Favorite Pop/Rock Male Artist	Paul McCartney	Nominated	(Note: Numerous sources here:)
American Music Awards	1983	Favorite Pop/Rock Song	"Ebony and Ivory" (with Stevie Wonder)	Nominated	(Note: Numerous sources here:)
American Music Awards	1986	Merit	Paul McCartney	Honored	(Note: Numerous sources here:)
American Music Awards	1997	Favorite Pop/Rock Album	The Beatles Anthology	Nominated	(Note: Numerous sources here:)
American Music Awards	2015	Collaboration of the Year	"FourFiveSeconds" (with Rihanna and Kanye West)	Nominated	(Note: Numerous sources here:)
Brit Awards	1977	British Group	The Beatles	Won	
Brit Awards	1977	Outstanding Contribution to Music	The Beatles	Won	
Brit Awards	1977	British Album of the Year	Sgt. Peppers Lonely Hearts Club Band	Won	
Brit Awards	1977	British Single of the Year	"She Loves You"	Nominated	
Brit Awards	1983	British Male Solo Artist	Paul McCartney	Won	
Brit Awards	1983	Sony Trophy Award for Technical Excellence	Paul McCartney	Won	
Brit Awards	1983	Outstanding Contribution to Music	The Beatles	Won	
Brit Awards	1984	British Male Solo Artist	Paul McCartney	Nominated	
Brit Awards	1985	British Male Solo Artist	Paul McCartney	Nominated	
Brit Awards	1985	Soundtrack/Cast Recording	Give My Regards to Broad Street	Nominated	
Brit Awards	1990	British Single of the Year	"Ferry Cross the Mersey"	Nominated	
Brit Awards	1990	British Video of the Year	"My Brave Face"	Nominated	
Brit Awards	2008	Outstanding Contribution to Music	Paul McCartney	Honored	
BMI Latin Awards	1997	Award-winning song	"Dame Tu Mano Ven (I Want to Hold Your Hand)"	Won	
Classic Brit Awards	2007	Album of the Year	Ecce Cor Meum	Won	
MusiCares Person of the Year	2012	Person of the Year	Paul McCartney	Honored	
MTV Video Music Awards	1984	Video Vanguard Award	The Beatles	Honored	
MTV Europe Music Awards	2008	Ultimate Legend Award	Paul McCartney	Honored	
MVPA Awards	2008	Best International Video	"Dance Tonight"	Won	
MVPA Awards	2008	Best International Video	"Ever Present Past"	Nominated	
NME Awards	1963	World Vocal Group	The Beatles	Won	
NME Awards	1963	British Vocal Group	The Beatles	Won	
NME Awards	1963	Best British Disc Of The Year – "She Loves You"	The Beatles	Won	
NME Awards	1964	Outstanding Vocal Group	The Beatles	Won	
NME Awards	1964	British Vocal Group	The Beatles	Won	
NME Awards	1965	British Vocal Group	The Beatles	Won	
NME Awards	1965	World Vocal Group	The Beatles	Won	
NME Awards	1966	British Vocal Group	The Beatles	Won	
NME Awards	1966	Best British Disc This Year – ‘Eleanor Rigby’	The Beatles	Won	
NME Awards	1968	World Vocal Group	The Beatles	Won	
NME Awards	1968	British Vocal Group	The Beatles	Won	
NME Awards	1968	Best British Disc This Year – ‘Hey Jude’	The Beatles	Won	
NME Awards	1970	Top British Group	The Beatles	Won	
NME Awards	1970	1970's Best British LP – ’Let It Be’	The Beatles	Won	
NME Awards	1971	Top British Group	The Beatles	Won	
NME Awards	1971	Best British LP – ‘Let It Be’	The Beatles	Won	
NME Awards	1974	Best bass guitarist	Paul McCartney	Won	
NME Awards	1976	Best bass guitarist	Paul McCartney	Won	
NME Awards	1980	For Outstanding Services to Music	Paul McCartney	Won	
NME Awards	2000	Best Band Ever	The Beatles	Won	
NME Awards	2005	Best Event	Paul McCartney	Won	
NME Awards	2014	The Songwriter's Songwriter	Paul McCartney	Won	
Q Awards	1990	Merit Award		Won}	
Q Awards	1996	Best Reissue/Compilation Album	The Beatles Anthology, The Beatles	Won	
Q Awards	1997	Songwriter Award		Honored	
Q Awards	2007	Icon Award		Honored	
Q Awards	2010	Classic Album	Band on the Run, Wings	Won	
National Video Game Reviewers Awards	2014	Song, Original or Adapted	Paul McCartney – "Hope for the Future"	Nominated	

== Honorary awards ==
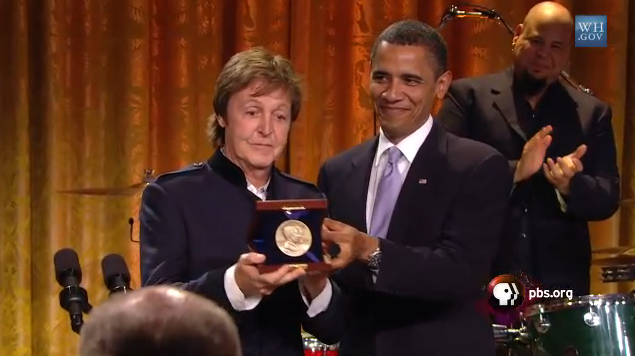
McCartney receiving the Gershwin Prize from US President Barack Obama in June 2010

Organizations	Year	Notes	Result	Ref.
Library of Congress	2010	Gershwin Prize	Honored	
John F. Kennedy Center for the Performing Arts	2010	Kennedy Center Honors	Honored	
Queen Elizabeth II	1965	Most Excellent Order of the British Empire (MBE)	Honored	
Queen Elizabeth II	1997	Knight Bachelor	Honored	
Songwriters Hall of Fame	1987	Induction	Honored	
Rock & Roll Hall of Fame	1999	Induction	Honored	
The Republic of Peru	2011	Grand Cross of the Order of the Sun	Honored	
National Library of Peru	2011	Medal of Honor	Honored	
French President François Hollande	2012	Legion of Honour	Honored	
Hollywood Walk of Fame	2012	Star at 1750 N. Vine Street.	Honored	
Queen Elizabeth II	2017	Order of the Companions of Honour (CH)	Honored	
Rolling Stone	2023	Inclusion at #67 on its list of the 200 Greatest Singers of All Time	Honored	

== State and Commonwealth honors ==
Date	Country	Ribbon	Award
12 Jun 1965	United Kingdom		Member of the Most Excellent Order of the British Empire (MBE).
Dec 1993	Chile		Order of Merit (unknown grade).
31 Dec 1996	United Kingdom		In the 1997, McCartney was knighted for his services to music.
5 Dec 2010	United States		Kennedy Center Honors.
5 May 2011	Peru		Grand Cross of the Order of the Sun, the highest award bestowed by the nation of Peru (Note: in a private ceremony while visiting the country for a concert in the city of Lima).
9 May 2011	Peru		La Orden del Árbol de la Quina, an order given by the Ministry of Environment of Peru for his environmental work.
9 May 2011	Peru		Medal of Honor of the National Library of Peru.
8 Sep 2012	France		Officer of the Legion of Honour for services to music, awarded by French President François Hollande at the Élysée Palace.
16 Jun 2017	United Kingdom		In the 2017, McCartney was appointed to the Order of the Companions of Honour (CH) for his services to music.

Sir Paul was also considered for a Peerage in March 2022 for his 80th birthday.
