= Pure McCartney (Paul McCartney album) =

Compilation album by Paul McCartney
- Released: 10 June 2016
- Recorded: 1970–2013
- Genre: Rock
- Length: 150:01 (Standard edition); 157:34 (Vinyl edition); 257:13 (Deluxe edition)
- Label: Concord Music Group
- Producers: Paul McCartney; Linda McCartney; Youth; Nigel Godrich; Paul Epworth; George Martin; Chris Thomas

Paul McCartney chronology
New (2013)	Pure McCartney (2016)	Egypt Station (2018)

Pure McCartney is the fourth compilation album by Paul McCartney, released on 10 June 2016. It features mostly solo material but also includes tracks recorded with Wings and the Fireman.

== Background ==
The album was first teased in late March 2016 by cryptic video posts placed on McCartney's Facebook and Twitter pages. He also says: There are no cover versions, which may be in line with the "pure" concept.

When the album was announced by McCartney on 31 March 2016, he downplayed the use of "career" in describing the collection, rather referring to it as representative of a "musical adventure". He also noted he and his team compiled the tracks for the alternate track listings "with nothing else in mind other than having something fun to listen to" in different settings.

The album features tracks from all of his official pre-2016 vocal studio albums (solo, or with Wings) with the exception of Снова в СССР, Flowers in the Dirt, Run Devil Run and Driving Rain, nor does it include material from any of his classical albums.

== Critical reception ==
Pablo Gorondi from ABC News says: "Pure McCartney is a substantial, honest and gratifying introduction to the long and winding career of a pop music giant, a tasting menu whetting the appetite for more". AllMusic's Stephen Thomas Erlewine gave the compilation 4.5 out of 5 stars, saying: "Pure McCartney gets closer to capturing the full range of his career than any of his previous compilations, but it's still only an introduction to one of the richest bodies of work in pop music." Chris Gerard of PopMatters also praised the collection, giving it an 8/10. Reviewing the deluxe edition, he stated: "Despite its flaws, Pure McCartney is an excellent introduction to the legend's solo work for the newly initiated and a fantastic opportunity for old fans to rediscover many of the key tracks in his catalog in a new and different light. It's a collection rich with terrific songwriting and performances, a monumental testament to Paul McCartney's legacy that extends far beyond the Beatles." Erlewine, Gerard and Goldmine's John Borack primarily criticised the "overrepresentation" of some albums, such as Band on the Run and Flaming Pie, the exclusion of several of McCartney's studio albums, particularly Flowers in the Dirt, and some of the song choices. Classic Rock magazine's David Quantick praised the compilation, giving it 4.5 out of 5 stars, but believed it "only scratches the surface" of McCartney's catalogue.

== Track listing ==
Three versions of the album have been released, a two-disc CD of 39 tracks, a four-disc LP of 41 tracks (adding tracks "New" and "Too Many People") and a four-disc CD (and deluxe digital edition) of 67 tracks. All songs are written by Paul McCartney, except where noted.

=== Standard edition ===
==== Disc 1 ====
No.	Title	Writer(s)	Album	Length
1.	"Maybe I'm Amazed"		McCartney, 1970	3:51
2.	"Heart of the Country"	Linda McCartney, Paul McCartney	Ram, 1971	2:24
3.	"Jet"	L. McCartney, P. McCartney	Band on the Run, 1973	4:09
4.	"Warm and Beautiful"	L. McCartney, P. McCartney	Wings at the Speed of Sound, 1976	3:14
5.	"Listen to What the Man Said"	L. McCartney, P. McCartney	Venus and Mars, 1975	4:03
6.	"Dear Boy"	L. McCartney, P. McCartney	Ram	2:15
7.	"Silly Love Songs"	L. McCartney, P. McCartney	Wings at the Speed of Sound	5:55
8.	"The Song We Were Singing"		Flaming Pie, 1997	3:55
9.	"Uncle Albert/Admiral Halsey"	L. McCartney, P. McCartney	Ram	4:56
10.	"Another Day"	L. McCartney, P. McCartney	non-album single, 1971	3:43
11.	"Sing the Changes"		Electric Arguments, 2008 (under the name "The Fireman" with Youth)	3:45
12.	"Jenny Wren"		Chaos and Creation in the Backyard, 2005	3:48
13.	"Save Us"	Paul Epworth, P. McCartney	New, 2013	2:40
14.	"Mrs. Vandebilt"	L. McCartney, P. McCartney	Band on the Run	4:40
15.	"Mull of Kintyre"	Denny Laine, P. McCartney	non-album single, 1977	4:45
16.	"Let 'Em In"	L. McCartney, P. McCartney	Wings at the Speed of Sound	5:11
17.	"Let Me Roll It"	L. McCartney, P. McCartney	Band on the Run	4:50
18.	"Nineteen Hundred and Eighty-Five"	L. McCartney, P. McCartney	Band on the Run	5:31
19.	"Ebony and Ivory" (with Stevie Wonder)		Tug of War, 1982	3:46
Total length:				77:21

==== Disc 2 ====
No.	Title	Writer(s)	Album	Length
1.	"Band on the Run"	L. McCartney, P. McCartney	Band on the Run	5:14
2.	"Arrow Through Me"		Back to the Egg, 1979	3:38
3.	"My Love"	L. McCartney, P. McCartney	Red Rose Speedway, 1973	4:10
4.	"Live and Let Die"	L. McCartney, P. McCartney	Live and Let Die soundtrack, 1973	3:13
5.	"Too Much Rain"		Chaos and Creation in the Backyard	3:26
6.	"Goodnight Tonight"		non-album single, 1979	4:22
7.	"Say Say Say" (with Michael Jackson; radio edit; 2015 remix)	Michael Jackson, P. McCartney	Pipes of Peace, 1983	3:40
8.	"My Valentine"		Kisses on the Bottom, 2012	3:16
9.	"The World Tonight"		Flaming Pie	4:06
10.	"Pipes of Peace"		Pipes of Peace	3:57
11.	"Dance Tonight"		Memory Almost Full, 2007	2:56
12.	"Here Today"		Tug of War	2:29
13.	"Wanderlust"		Tug of War	3:51
14.	"Great Day"		Flaming Pie	2:09
15.	"Coming Up"		McCartney II, 1980	3:52
16.	"No More Lonely Nights" (radio edit)		Give My Regards to Broad Street soundtrack, 1984	4:43
17.	"Only Mama Knows"		Memory Almost Full	4:19
18.	"With a Little Luck" (DJ edit)		London Town, 1978	3:13
19.	"Hope for the Future"		Destiny video game soundtrack, 2014	4:09
20.	"Junk"		McCartney	1:57
Total length:				72:40

=== Vinyl edition ===
Side 1
No.	Title	Writer(s)	Album	Length
1.	"Maybe I'm Amazed"		McCartney
2.	"Heart of the Country"	L. McCartney, P. McCartney	Ram
3.	"Jet"	L. McCartney, P. McCartney	Band on the Run
4.	"Warm and Beautiful"	L. McCartney, P. McCartney	Wings at the Speed of Sound
5.	"Listen to What the Man Said"	L. McCartney, P. McCartney	Venus and Mars
6.	"Dear Boy"	L. McCartney, P. McCartney	Ram

Side 2
No.	Title	Writer(s)	Album	Length
1.	"Silly Love Songs"	L. McCartney, P. McCartney	Wings at the Speed of Sound
2.	"The Song We Were Singing"		Flaming Pie
3.	"Uncle Albert/Admiral Halsey"	L. McCartney, P. McCartney	Ram
4.	"Another Day"	L. McCartney, P. McCartney	non-album single
5.	"New"		New

Side 3
No.	Title	Writer(s)	Album	Length
1.	"Mull of Kintyre"	Laine, P. McCartney	non-album single
2.	"Sing the Changes"		Electric Arguments
3.	"Jenny Wren"		Chaos and Creation in the Backyard
4.	"Mrs. Vandebilt"	L. McCartney, P. McCartney	Band on the Run
5.	"Save Us"		New

Side 4
No.	Title	Writer(s)	Album	Length
1.	"Let 'Em In"	L. McCartney, P. McCartney	Wings at the Speed of Sound
2.	"Let Me Roll It"	L. McCartney, P. McCartney	Band on the Run
3.	"Ebony and Ivory" (with Stevie Wonder; 2015 remix)		Tug of War
4.	"Nineteen Hundred and Eighty-Five"	L. McCartney, P. McCartney	Band on the Run

Side 5
No.	Title	Writer(s)	Album	Length
1.	"Band on the Run"	L. McCartney, P. McCartney	Band on the Run
2.	"Arrow Through Me"		Back to the Egg
3.	"My Love"	L. McCartney, P. McCartney	Red Rose Speedway
4.	"Live and Let Die"	L. McCartney, P. McCartney	Live and Let Die
5.	"Too Much Rain"		Chaos and Creation in the Backyard

Side 6
No.	Title	Writer(s)	Album	Length
1.	"Say Say Say" (with Michael Jackson; radio edit; 2015 remix)	Jackson, P. McCartney	Pipes of Peace
2.	"My Valentine"		Kisses on the Bottom
3.	"Goodnight Tonight"		non-album single
4.	"The World Tonight"		Flaming Pie
5.	"Pipes of Peace"		Pipes of Peace

Side 7
No.	Title	Album	Length
1.	"Dance Tonight"	Memory Almost Full
2.	"Here Today" (radio edit)	Tug of War
3.	"Wanderlust" (radio edit)	Tug of War
4.	"Great Day"	Flaming Pie
5.	"Coming Up"	McCartney II
6.	"No More Lonely Nights" (radio edit)	Give My Regards to Broad Street

Side 8
No.	Title	Album	Length
1.	"Too Many People"	Ram
2.	"Only Mama Knows"	Memory Almost Full
3.	"With a Little Luck" (DJ edit)	London Town
4.	"Hope for the Future"	Destiny
5.	"Junk"	McCartney

=== Deluxe edition ===
==== Disc 1 ====
No.	Title	Writer(s)	Album	Length
1.	"Maybe I'm Amazed"		McCartney	3:52
2.	"Heart of the Country"	L. McCartney, P. McCartney	Ram	2:25
3.	"Jet"	L. McCartney, P. McCartney	Band on the Run	4:10
4.	"Warm and Beautiful"	L. McCartney, P. McCartney	Wings at the Speed of Sound	3:14
5.	"Listen to What the Man Said"	L. McCartney, P. McCartney	Venus and Mars	4:03
6.	"Dear Boy"	L. McCartney, P. McCartney	Ram	2:15
7.	"Silly Love Songs"	L. McCartney, P. McCartney	Wings at the Speed of Sound	5:55
8.	"The Song We Were Singing"		Flaming Pie	3:55
9.	"Uncle Albert/Admiral Halsey"	L. McCartney, P. McCartney	Ram	4:57
10.	"Early Days"		New	4:08
11.	"Big Barn Bed"	L. McCartney, P. McCartney	Red Rose Speedway	3:51
12.	"Another Day"	L. McCartney, P. McCartney	non-album single	3:43
13.	"Flaming Pie"		Flaming Pie	2:31
14.	"Jenny Wren"		Chaos and Creation in the Backyard	3:49
15.	"Too Many People"		Ram	4:12
16.	"Let Me Roll It"	L. McCartney, P. McCartney	Band on the Run	4:51
17.	"New"		New	2:58
Total length:				64:49

==== Disc 2 ====
No.	Title	Writer(s)	Album	Length
1.	"Live and Let Die"	L. McCartney, P. McCartney	Live and Let Die	3:15
2.	"English Tea"		Chaos and Creation in the Backyard	2:14
3.	"Mull of Kintyre"	Laine, P. McCartney	non-album single	4:46
4.	"Save Us"	Epworth, P. McCartney	New	2:41
5.	"My Love"	L. McCartney, P. McCartney	Red Rose Speedway	4:10
6.	"Bip Bop"	L. McCartney, P. McCartney	Wild Life, 1971	4:13
7.	"Let 'Em In"	L. McCartney, P. McCartney	Wings at the Speed of Sound	5:11
8.	"Nineteen Hundred and Eighty-Five"	L. McCartney, P. McCartney	Band on the Run	5:32
9.	"Calico Skies"		Flaming Pie	2:32
10.	"Hi, Hi, Hi"	L. McCartney, P. McCartney	non-album single, 1972	3:10
11.	"Waterfalls"		McCartney II	4:46
12.	"Band on the Run"		Band on the Run	5:14
13.	"Appreciate"		New	4:30
14.	"Sing the Changes"		Electric Arguments	3:46
15.	"Arrow Through Me"		Back to the Egg	3:39
16.	"Every Night"		McCartney	2:34
17.	"Junior's Farm"	L. McCartney, P. McCartney	non-album single, 1974	4:23
18.	"Mrs. Vandebilt"		Band on the Run	4:41
Total length:				71:16

==== Disc 3 ====
No.	Title	Writer(s)	Album	Length
1.	"Say Say Say" (with Michael Jackson; 2015 remix)	Jackson, P. McCartney	Pipes of Peace	3:57
2.	"My Valentine"		Kisses on the Bottom	3:16
3.	"Pipes of Peace"		Pipes of Peace	3:57
4.	"The World Tonight"		Flaming Pie	4:06
5.	"Souvenir"		Flaming Pie	3:40
6.	"Dance Tonight"		Memory Almost Full	2:56
7.	"Ebony and Ivory" (with Stevie Wonder)		Tug of War	3:46
8.	"Fine Line"		Chaos and Creation in the Backyard	3:07
9.	"Here Today"		Tug of War	2:29
10.	"Press"		Press to Play, 1986	4:47
11.	"Wanderlust"		Tug of War	3:51
12.	"Winedark Open Sea"		Off the Ground, 1993	5:28
13.	"Beautiful Night"		Flaming Pie	5:08
14.	"Girlfriend"		London Town	4:43
15.	"Queenie Eye"	Epworth, P. McCartney	New	3:49
16.	"We All Stand Together"		Rupert and the Frog Song soundtrack, 1984	4:25
Total length:				63:11

==== Disc 4 ====
No.	Title	Writer(s)	Album	Length
1.	"Coming Up"		McCartney II	3:54
2.	"Too Much Rain"		Chaos and Creation in the Backyard	3:26
3.	"Good Times Coming/Feel the Sun"		Press to Play	4:57
4.	"Goodnight Tonight"		non-album single	4:22
5.	"Baby's Request"		Back to the Egg	2:51
6.	"With a Little Luck" (DJ edit)		London Town	3:13
7.	"Little Willow"		Flaming Pie	2:58
8.	"Only Mama Knows"		Memory Almost Full	4:20
9.	"Don't Let It Bring You Down"	Laine, P. McCartney	London Town	4:36
10.	"The Back Seat of My Car"		Ram	4:31
11.	"No More Lonely Nights" (7" single version)		Give My Regards to Broad Street	4:44
12.	"Great Day"		Flaming Pie	2:09
13.	"Venus and Mars/Rock Show" (radio edit)	L. McCartney, P. McCartney	Venus and Mars	3:48
14.	"Temporary Secretary"		McCartney II	3:16
15.	"Hope for the Future"		Destiny	4:09
16.	"Junk"		McCartney	1:57
Total length:				59:12

== Charts ==
=== Weekly charts ===
Weekly chart performance for Pure McCartney
Chart (2016)	Peak position
Australian Albums (ARIA)	26
Austrian Albums (Ö3 Austria)	14
Belgian Albums (Ultratop Flanders)	3
Belgian Albums (Ultratop Wallonia)	4
Canadian Albums (Billboard)	48
Czech Albums (ČNS IFPI)	1
Dutch Albums (Album Top 100)	7
French Albums (SNEP)	17
German Albums (Offizielle Top 100)	7
Irish Albums (IRMA)	7
Italian Albums (FIMI)	17
New Zealand Albums (RMNZ)	15
Norwegian Albums (VG-lista)	26
Portuguese Albums (AFP)	46
Spanish Albums (Promusicae)	7
Swedish Albums (Sverigetopplistan)	50
Swiss Albums (Schweizer Hitparade)	25
UK Albums (Official Charts)	3
US Billboard 200	15
US Top Rock Albums (Billboard)	2

=== Year-end charts ===
Year-end chart performance for Pure McCartney
Chart (2016)	Position
Belgian Albums (Ultratop Flanders)	74
Belgian Albums (Ultratop Wallonia)	90
US Top Rock Albums (Billboard)	73

== Certifications ==
Certifications for Pure McCartney
Region	Certification	Certified units/sales
United Kingdom (BPI)	Gold	100,000^{‡}
^{‡} Sales+streaming figures based on certification alone.

== See also ==
- Wings Greatest (1978), a compilation of hits by McCartney from 1971 to 1978, mostly done by Wings.
- All the Best! (1987), a compilation of McCartney's hits as a solo artist and with Wings between 1970 and 1987.
- Wingspan: Hits and History (2001), a compilation of McCartney's solo and Wings material from 1970's McCartney to 1984's Give My Regards to Broad Street.
