= The Space Within US =

Video by Paul McCartney
- Released: 14 November 2006
- Recorded: September – December 2005
- Genre: Rock
- Length: 115 min.
- Labels: MPL; A&E Home Video
- Director: Mark Haefeli
- Producers: Paul McCartney; Mark Haefeli; Delia Fine; Ryan Harrington; David Kahne (music producer)

Paul McCartney chronology
Paul McCartney in Red Square (2005)	The Space Within US (2006)	The McCartney Years (2007)

Professional ratings
Review scores
Source	Rating
Allmusic	3.5/5 stars
Blogcritics	(?)

The Space Within US is a live DVD by Paul McCartney, directed by Mark Haefeli and released in November 2006. It features footage taken during McCartney's 2005 'US' Tour and interviews with him, the band, and various celebrities; weaving reflections on peace and connection with a symbolic message about “space” as both an outer and inner realm. It also includes a live connection with the astronauts of ISS Expedition 12 in collaboration with NASA, during which McCartney performs two songs for them.

A Blu-ray version was released on 18 November 2008. It reached number 3 in the US video charts.

== Chapter listing ==
1. "Intro"
2. "Magical Mystery Tour"
3. "Flaming Pie"
4. "Let Me Roll It" / "Foxy Lady"
5. "Drive My Car"
6. "Till There Was You"
7. "I'll Get You"
8. "Eleanor Rigby"
9. "Maybe I'm Amazed"
10. "Got to Get You into My Life"
11. "Fine Line"
12. "I Will"
13. "I'll Follow the Sun"
14. "Good Day Sunshine"
15. "For No One"
16. "Hey Jude" (fragment)
17. "Fixing a Hole"
18. "Penny Lane"
19. "Too Many People" / "She Came in Through the Bathroom Window"
20. "Let It Be" (montage)
21. "English Tea"
  - Played live as a "wake-up" call to the crew of the International Space Station nearing the end of the Anaheim, California concert on 12 November 2005 (13 November on the east coast of the United States).
22. "I've Got a Feeling"
23. "Follow Me"
24. "Jenny Wren"
25. "Helter Skelter"
26. "Yesterday"
27. "Get Back"
28. "Please Please Me"
29. "Credits"

=== Extra features ===
- Sound check songs: "Whole Lotta Shakin' Goin' On", "Friends to Go", "How Kind of You"
- More About US – Interviews with Paul McCartney, the band, and the US tour crew
- US tour pre-show film
- On the Road With US
- Liner notes introduction by Cameron Crowe
- Song selection

== Awards ==
- Cinema Audio Society, USA: 2007 C.A.S. Award
  - Winner: Outstanding Achievement in Sound Mixing for Television – Non-Fiction, Variety or Music – Series or Specials
    - Matt Foglia (re-recording mixer); David Kahne (music mixer)

== Charts ==
Chart (2006)	Peak position
Australian Music DVDs Chart	16
Czech Republic Music DVDs Chart	19
Danish Music DVDs Chart	7
Dutch Music DVDs Chart	15
Hungarian Music DVDs Chart	8
Italian Music DVDs Chart	8
Norwegian Music DVDs Chart	7
Spanish Music DVDs Chart	15
US Music Videos Chart	3

== Certifications ==
Region	Certification	Certified units/sales
Argentina (CAPIF)	Platinum	8,000^{^}
Australia (ARIA)	Gold	7,500^{^}
Canada (Music Canada)	2× Platinum	20,000^{^}
France (SNEP)	Gold	10,000^{*}
United States (RIAA)	Platinum	100,000^{^}
^{*} Sales figures based on certification alone.^{^} Shipments figures based on certification alone.
