= The 'US' Tour =

2005 concert tour by Paul McCartney

- Continental tour by Paul McCartney
- Location: North America
- Associated album: Chaos and Creation in the Backyard
- Start date: 16 September 2005
- End date: 30 November 2005
- No. of shows: 37
- Box office: U.S. $77 million ($126.93 in 2025 dollars)

Paul McCartney concert chronology
- '04 Summer Tour (2004); The 'US' Tour (2005); Secret Tour 2007 (2007)

The 'US' Tour was a concert tour by English musician Paul McCartney to promote his 2005 album Chaos and Creation in the Backyard. The tour, his second North American venture of the 21st century, began on 16 September 2005 in Miami, United States, and concluded on 30 November 2005 in Los Angeles. It was a commercial success, grossing $77 million from 37 shows across North America and selling over 565,000 tickets. Rusty Anderson, Brian Ray, Paul "Wix" Wickens, and Abe Laboriel, Jr. returned as the backing band, the first to fully remain intact for more than one solo McCartney tour, following the previous year's summer jaunt in the UK. McCartney's then-wife Heather Mills and their daughter, Beatrice, accompanied him on the tour and were in the audience every night.

On 12 November 2005 in Anaheim, California, two songs and some dialogue from the concert were broadcast to the International Space Station and astronauts Valeri Tokarev and Bill McArthur. The songs played were The Beatles' "Good Day Sunshine" and McCartney's "English Tea", a song from his Chaos and Creation in the Backyard album. A concert film and documentary of the tour was released the following year. It is available on the DVD The Space Within US.

== Set list ==
1. "Magical Mystery Tour"
2. "Flaming Pie"
3. "Jet"
4. "I'll Get You"
5. "Drive My Car"
6. "Till There Was You"
7. "Let Me Roll It/Foxy Lady"
8. "Got to Get You into My Life"
9. "Fine Line"
10. "Maybe I'm Amazed"
11. "The Long and Winding Road"
12. "In Spite of All the Danger"
13. "I Will"
14. "Jenny Wren"
15. "For No One"
16. "Fixing a Hole"
17. "English Tea"
18. "I'll Follow the Sun"
19. "Follow Me"
20. "Blackbird"
21. "Eleanor Rigby"
22. "Too Many People/She Came In Through the Bathroom Window"
23. "Good Day Sunshine"
24. "Band on the Run"
25. "Penny Lane"
26. "I've Got a Feeling"
27. "Back in the U.S.S.R."
28. "Hey Jude"
29. "Live And Let Die"
  - Encore 1
30. "Yesterday"
31. "Get Back"
32. "Helter Skelter"
  - Encore 2
33. "Please Please Me"
34. "Mull of Kintyre" (only in Canada)
35. "Let It Be"
36. "Sgt. Pepper's Lonely Hearts Club Band (Reprise)/The End"

== Tour dates ==
List of 2005 concerts
Date	City	Country	Venue	Attendance	Revenue
16 September	Miami	United States	American Airlines Arena	15,011 / 15,536	$2,137,915
17 September	Tampa	United States	St. Pete Times Forum	15,268 / 16,325	$2,277,952
20 September	Atlanta	United States	Philips Arena	14,096 / 14,096	$1,930,941
22 September	Philadelphia	United States	Wachovia Center	32,930 / 32,930	$4,665,795
23 September	Philadelphia	United States	Wachovia Center	32,930 / 32,930	$4,665,795
26 September	Boston	United States	TD Banknorth Garden	29,582 / 29,582	$3,814,392
27 September	Boston	United States	TD Banknorth Garden	29,582 / 29,582	$3,814,392
30 September	New York City	United States	Madison Square Garden	63,867 / 63,867	$8,495,513
1 October	New York City	United States	Madison Square Garden	63,867 / 63,867	$8,495,513
4 October	New York City	United States	Madison Square Garden	63,867 / 63,867	$8,495,513
5 October	New York City	United States	Madison Square Garden	63,867 / 63,867	$8,495,513
8 October	Washington, D.C.	United States	MCI Center	15,813 / 15,813	$2,011,464
10 October	Toronto	Canada	Air Canada Centre	16,924 / 16,924	$2,385,658
14 October	Auburn Hills	United States	The Palace of Auburn Hills	33,511 / 33,511	$4,733,526
15 October	Auburn Hills	United States	The Palace of Auburn Hills	33,511 / 33,511	$4,733,526
18 October	Chicago	United States	United Center	32,647 / 32,647	$4,087,404
19 October	Chicago	United States	United Center	32,647 / 32,647	$4,087,404
22 October	Columbus	United States	Schottenstein Center	15,051 / 15,051	$1,978,288
23 October	Milwaukee	United States	Bradley Center	16,764 / 16,764	$2,090,400
26 October	St. Paul	United States	Xcel Energy Center	16,515 / 16,515	$2,377,200
27 October	Des Moines	United States	Wells Fargo Arena	14,204 / 14,204	$1,620,717
30 October	Omaha	United States	Qwest Center Omaha	15,162 / 15,162	$1,690,185
1 November	Denver	United States	Pepsi Center	15,091 / 15,091	$1,994,777
3 November	Seattle	United States	KeyArena	13,492 / 13,511	$2,105,150
4 November	Portland	United States	Rose Garden	15,834 / 15,933	$1,948,380
7 November	San Jose	United States	HP Pavilion	28,012 / 28,012	$3,649,232
8 November	San Jose	United States	HP Pavilion	28,012 / 28,012	$3,649,232
11 November	Anaheim	United States	Arrowhead Pond of Anaheim	28,632 / 28,632	$3,394,958
12 November	Anaheim	United States	Arrowhead Pond of Anaheim	28,632 / 28,632	$3,394,958
16 November	Sacramento	United States	ARCO Arena	14,623 / 14,773	$1,971,370
19 November	Houston	United States	Toyota Center	14,151 / 14,151	$2,068,565
20 November	Dallas	United States	American Airlines Center	15,095 / 15,095	$2,116,940
23 November	Glendale	United States	Glendale Arena	14,802 / 14,802	$2,295,285
25 November	Paradise	United States	MGM Grand Garden Arena	29,535 / 29,535	$5,058,113
26 November	Paradise	United States	MGM Grand Garden Arena	29,535 / 29,535	$5,058,113
29 November	Los Angeles	United States	Staples Center	31,149 / 31,149	$4,144,879
30 November	Los Angeles	United States	Staples Center	31,149 / 31,149	$4,144,879
Total				567,761 / 569,611	$77,044,999

== Personnel ==
- Paul McCartney – lead vocals, acoustic guitar, electric guitar, bass guitar, and piano
- Rusty Anderson – backing vocals, acoustic and electric guitars
- Brian Ray – backing vocals, acoustic, electric and bass guitars
- Paul "Wix" Wickens – backing vocals, keyboards, accordion, electric guitar, harmonica, percussion
- Abe Laboriel, Jr. – backing vocals, drums, percussion
