= Never Stop Doing What You Love =

Compilation album by Paul McCartney
- Released: 1 September 2005
- Recorded: 1970–1995
- Genre: Rock
- Length: 58:33
- Label: EMI Special Markets
- Producer: Paul McCartney; George Martin; Phil Ramone; Jeff Lynne

Paul McCartney chronology
Chaos and Creation in the Backyard (2005)	Never Stop Doing What You Love (2005)	Ecce Cor Meum (2006)

Never Stop Doing What You Love is a not-for-resale compilation of various Paul McCartney and Wings songs created for the employees and clients of Fidelity Investments, a company in the financial services industry. The ex-Beatle became the mutual fund giant's new spokesman in 2005 in a campaign entitled "This Is Paul", and the disc was issued in support of the 'US' Tour of the same year. On the day of its release, company employees were treated to a special recorded message by Paul himself informing them that "Fidelity and I have a lot in common" and urging them "never [to] stop doing what you love." McCartney received considerable criticism for his celebrity endorsement of Fidelity Investments, which some considered to be a vulgar attempt to increase his already astounding wealth.

The cover features Paul playing his famous Höfner "Beatle" bass. The label side of the CD is printed to look like a vinyl record. The tracks for the compilation were chosen by McCartney and an executive from Fidelity, which had been given rights to McCartney's legacy catalog.

== Track listing ==
All songs written by Paul McCartney; and performed by Paul McCartney except where noted.

1. "Another Day" – 3:42
2. "Jet" – 4:06
  - Paul McCartney & Wings
3. "Let 'Em In" – 5:08
  - Wings
4. "With a Little Luck" – 3:12
  - Wings
5. "Live and Let Die" – 3:12
  - Paul McCartney & Wings
6. "Listen to What the Man Said"– 3:54
  - Wings
7. "My Love" – 4:07
  - Paul McCartney & Wings
8. "Take It Away" – 4:02
9. "No More Lonely Nights" – 4:38
10. "Silly Love Songs" – 5:52
  - Wings
11. "Put It There" – 2:06
12. "Once Upon a Long Ago" – 4:13
  - This marks the first time this song has been officially released in the United States.
13. "The World Tonight" – 4:03
14. "Bluebird" – 3:20
  - Paul McCartney & Wings
15. "Calico Skies" – 2:29
