= Beaconsfield High School =

Location
- Wattleton Road; Beaconsfield, Buckinghamshire, HP9 1RR; England; 51°36′14″N 0°38′38″W

Information
- Type: Grammar school; Academy
- Motto: Disciplina et Doctrina (Discipline and Principles)
- Local authority: Buckinghamshire
- Department for Education URN: 140893 Tables
- Ofsted: Reports
- Headteacher: Tina Bond
- Staff: 103
- Gender: Girls
- Age: 11 to 18
- Enrolment: 1,098
- Colour: Royal Blue
- Website: http://www.beaconsfieldhigh.bucks.sch.uk/

Beaconsfield High School is a girls' grammar school in Beaconsfield, Buckinghamshire. The school teaches girls between the ages of 11 and 18. Admission is based on the 11+ examination. The school has approximately 1,100 pupils with around 180 in each year group. The school has around 60 classrooms and built a new 'sixth form area' in 2010 which provided 12 new classrooms, a computer room, a new canteen and a new common room.

== History ==
Katharine, Duchess of Kent officially opened the site at 2.30pm on October 2 1967.

== Academics ==
In September 1997, the Department for Education and Skills (DfES) awarded the school specialist school status as a Technology College. It has been awarded a second specialism as a Language College. The school converted to academy status in September 2014.

In 2008 it achieved a 100% pass rate at GCSE with an average of 502 points per candidate, and a 100% pass rate at A Level with an average points score of 397 per candidate. As of 2012, the school obtained the best A-level results in Buckinghamshire.

The school is also one of only 45 schools to be rated 'Exceptional' by Ofsted in 2019.

== Head Teacher ==
Penny Castagnoli became the head teacher in 1995 and resigned from her post in August 2009. Owain Johns, deputy head and the head of design and technology department was the acting headteacher, although the school made a decision to employ Sally Jarrett who was offered the role and then stepped down. In April 2012 Annette France was appointed as headteacher; she resigned from her post in 2015. Rachel Smith was appointed headteacher in April 2015 until she retired in 2022. She was succeeded by Tina Bond, who was previously Acting Head Teacher in her capacity as Deputy Head.

== Notable former pupils ==
- Simone Ashley, actress
- Serena Evans, actress
- Elisabeth Kendall, Arabist
- Catherine Little, civil servant
- Beth Rigby, journalist
- Jane Treays, documentary maker
- Melanie Windridge, physicist
- Lauren Torley, rugby union player
