= Pedro Eustache =

Venezuelan musician (born 1959)

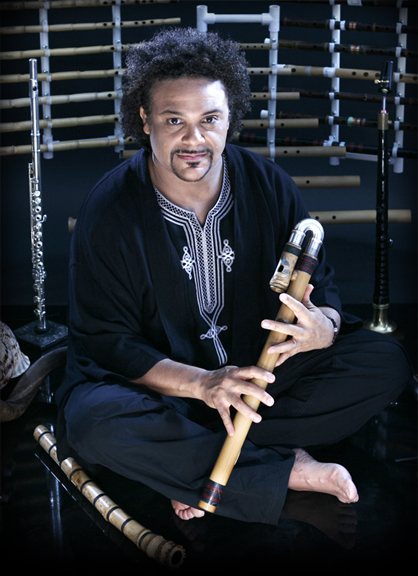
- Eustache in 2008

Background information
- Also known as: Flute Guy
- Born: August 18, 1959 (age 66); Caracas, Venezuela
- Genres: Classical; jazz; world; Latin; pop; electronic
- Occupation: Musician
- Instruments: Flute; saxophone; bass clarinet
- Years active: 1988–present
- Label: Gynook Productions Inc.
- Website: www.pedroflute.com

Pedro Eustache (born August 18, 1959), also known by the nickname "Flute Guy", is a Venezuelan flutist, reed player, woodwind player, composer, instrument maker, and collector.

Born and raised in Caracas, Venezuela, he has worked as a composer for various feature films and video games, and as a soloist for live concerts.

He gained notoriety online after his enthusiastic musical performance for the annual arrangement combining various melodies from Game Of The Year candidates, most notably Xenoblade Chronicles 3, at The Game Awards 2022, being often referred to as "Flute Guy" online.

== Education ==
Eustache studied first in Venezuela under Michel Eustache (his brother), Ernesto Santini, Antonio Jose Naranjo and Glenn Egner while he was a member of José Antonio Abreu's "Venezuelan Youth National Orchestra" (currently known as El Sistema). Upon graduation, he received a scholarship from the Venezuelan government to study in Europe at the Hector Berlioz Conservatoire and L'École de Musique d'Asnières, with Raymond Guiot and Pierre-Yves Artaud respectively, with advanced studies with Aurèle Nicolet in Basel, Switzerland. He also has a M.F.A. in jazz from the California Institute of the Arts, U.S.

== Career ==
In February 2009, Eustache premiered his composition "Suite Concertante for World Woodwinds & Symphony Orchestra". Eustache performed on 21 solo woodwind instruments under the baton of his fellow-countryman Gustavo Dudamel with his "Orquesta Sinfónica Simón Bolívar" in Caracas, Venezuela.

Eustache performed a "Multidirectional Flute" solo concert at the Conservatoire National Supérieure de Musique et Danse de Paris-France. He was the opening soloist at the third International Spanish Flute Convention "Gala concert" in Seville 2014.

Eustache was a featured soloist with the wind ensemble of Samford University, under the baton of soloist and conductor Demondrae Thurman, Birmingham Alabama, Oct. 2014. In 2008 and 2015 he gave solo concerts in Beirut, Lebanon at the "Palais de L'UNESCO" under the aegis of the Middle Eastern Bible Society [Lebanon], directed by Dr. Michel Bassous. He was also one of the guest's soloists invited by the Armenian government and Garik Israelian for the six hour long '80 years Anniversary Tribute-Concert' in Yerevan, Armenia.

He has also performed and/or recorded as a featured soloist with the Orchestra dell'Accademia Nazionale di Santa Cecilia, L'Orchestre Symphonique Du Bal de Vienne, Orquesta Sinfónica Simón Bolívar [principal solo flute "chair" for three years], London Symphony Orchestra, Prague Symphony Orchestra, Venezuela Symphony Orchestra [first flute chair for two years], and the Caracas Symphonietta.

=== Film scores ===
Eustache has often provided solo woodwind for recording sessions in Los Angeles, California. He has done studio sessions for movies as a flute/woodwinds instrumentalist, including being the main world woodwinds soloist for Mel Gibson's The Passion of the Christ soundtrack, written by John Debney.

He won the 2007 Film & TV Music Award for Best Instrumental Performance by a Soloist in a Film or Television Score category for his work in Hans Zimmer's Pirates of the Caribbean: At World's End.

He played Middle-Eastern flutes, reeds, and Armenian duduk featured in Steven Spielberg's Munich (nominated for both the 2006 Oscars and the 49th Grammy Awards for "Best Soundtrack"), composed and conducted by John Williams, as well as King Kenacho & Bs. Persian Ney in "Indiana Jones and the Kingdom of the Crystal Skull". He also soloed extensively in Middle-Eastern woodwinds & duduk with the London Symphony Orchestra for the film, The Body. He played the Chinese flute dizi solo for Oogway Ascends from Kung Fu Panda in Hans Zimmer Live.

He worked with Hans Zimmer on the woodwinds music for the film Dune in 2021, as well as its sequel Dune: Part Two in 2024.

=== Collaborations ===
Eustache's world flutes and woodwinds solos are featured on Paul McCartney's songs "Jenny Wren", and "Growing Up Falling Down" which appears on the single Fine Line. For ten years, he was the principal flute of Yanni Orchestra. He later performed on McCartney's 2018 album, Egypt Station. He was a featured soloist in the 2005 Grammy Award winner "Concert For George".

He collaborated on 2014 Persian traditional music album Beyond Any Form.

He played with Hans Zimmer on the 2025 Hans Zimmer Live Tour in the Qudos Stadium at Sydney Olympic Park on 26th and 27th April 2025.

=== Other performances ===
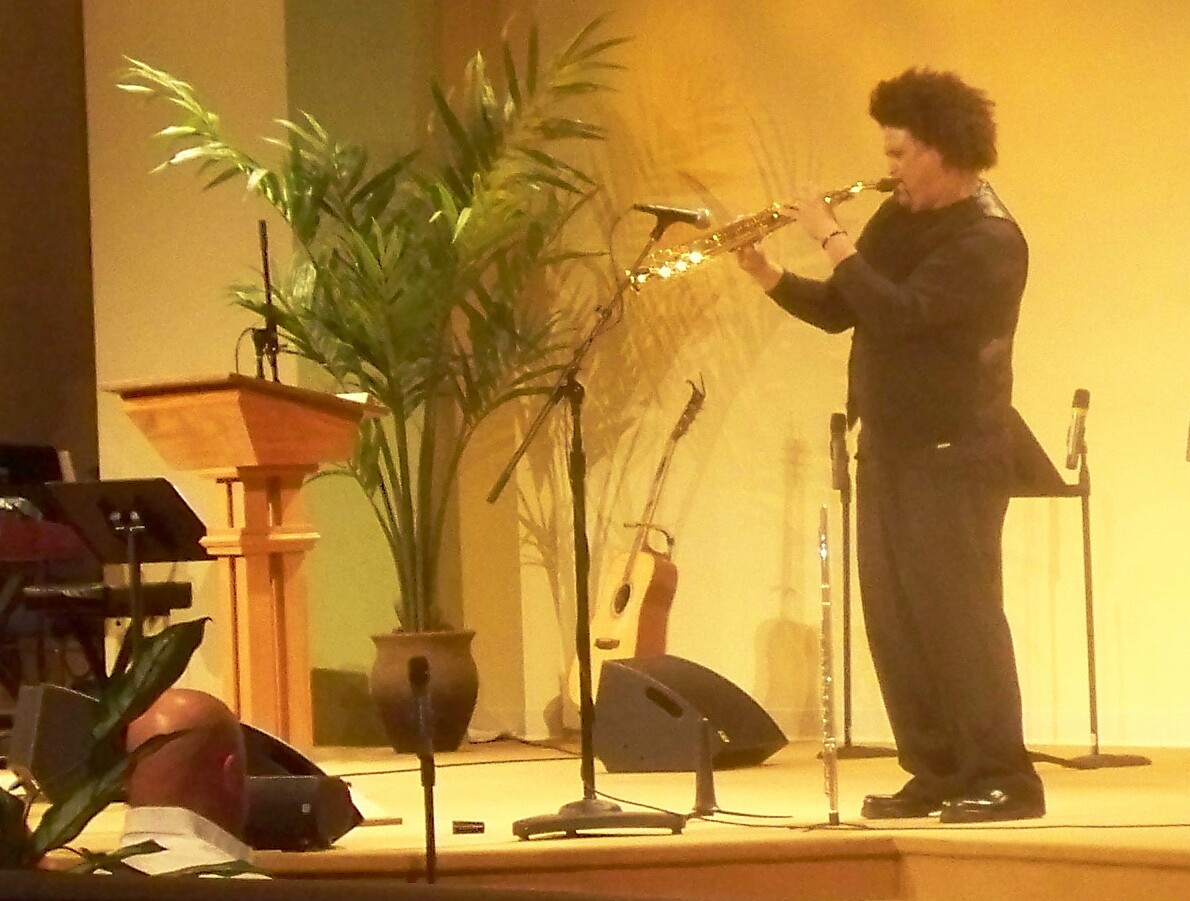
Eustache performing in Santa Clarita, California in May 2009

Eustache was the featured winds soloist on Ramin Djawadi's/HBO's "Game of Thrones - Live Music Experience" international tour of 2017. In 2017, he was also the featured solo wind soloist in "Hans Zimmer Live" world tour.

Eustache was a featured performer of South American woodwinds and Afro-Venezuelan percussion on Gustavo Dudamel's "Libertador" orchestral suite, with the Los Angeles Philharmonic at the Hollywood Bowl in the "Noche de Cine" concert special, July 30, 2014. He has been the woodwinds featured soloist with Yanni's orchestra since 1995, most recently during the 2003-2004 Ethnicity and 2005 Yanni Live! tours. He is the featured flute, sax, and world winds soloist with Persian-pop diva, Googoosh.

Eustache was brass section leader (tenor saxophone), for the Inside Job U.S. West-Coast tour for Don Henley. He was also a house band member for Edward James Olmos' Americanos Concert with Latin Superstars Cachao Lopez, Gloria Estefan, Paquito D'Rivera, José Feliciano, Juan Luis Guerra, Sheila E., held at the Kennedy Center, Washington D.C., for the PBS Presents series. With the ORF Radio Symphony Orchestra, he played flute and cuatro at the Hollywood in Vienna 2018 dedicated to Hans Zimmer score film music.

At The Game Awards 2022, Eustache's enthusiastic performance with the Game Awards Orchestra, of which he was a part since 2017, led to him becoming a fan-favorite of the show. His seamless transitions between several wind instruments were immediately noted by viewers, most notably during the Xenoblade Chronicles 3 section of the Orchestra's medley, who kept the hashtag #FluteGuy trending on Twitter throughout the night and were regarded by many as the highlight of the entire awards show. The positive responses to Eustache's performance led to him returning to perform at subsequent Game Awards ceremonies, again performing with the Game Awards Orchestra before the Game of the Year announcement. At 2025's Game Awards, Eustache also debuted a new type of flute made out of PVC pipe that he made specifically for use in the Game of the Year performance.

=== Teaching ===
In October 2014, he was an artist-in-residence at Samford University, teaching master-classes in music fundamentals, musical aesthetics, western classical performance, jazz improvisation, and world music winds.

Eustache has also taught Classical western flute in the Venezuelan National Youth Symphony's Conservatory, the Children's Orchestra Conservatory; Jazz flute in 1993–95 at the California Institute of the Arts, and more recently [in 2008], in a renewed connection with his native country, "Introduction to Music Technology", "Improvisation for Non-Improvisers" Parts I & II & "World Music I: Introduction to The Classical Music of North India" [extension courses] at the Instituto Universitario de Estudios Musicales.

== Discography ==
As a Soloist:

- Hymns Of Yesterday & Today (2007)
- Global Mvission (2004)
- The Giant Sleeps (1995)
- Strive for Higher Realities (1993)
- Dune: Part Two (2024)
