= Melanie Windridge =

British plasma physicist

Dr Melanie Windridge
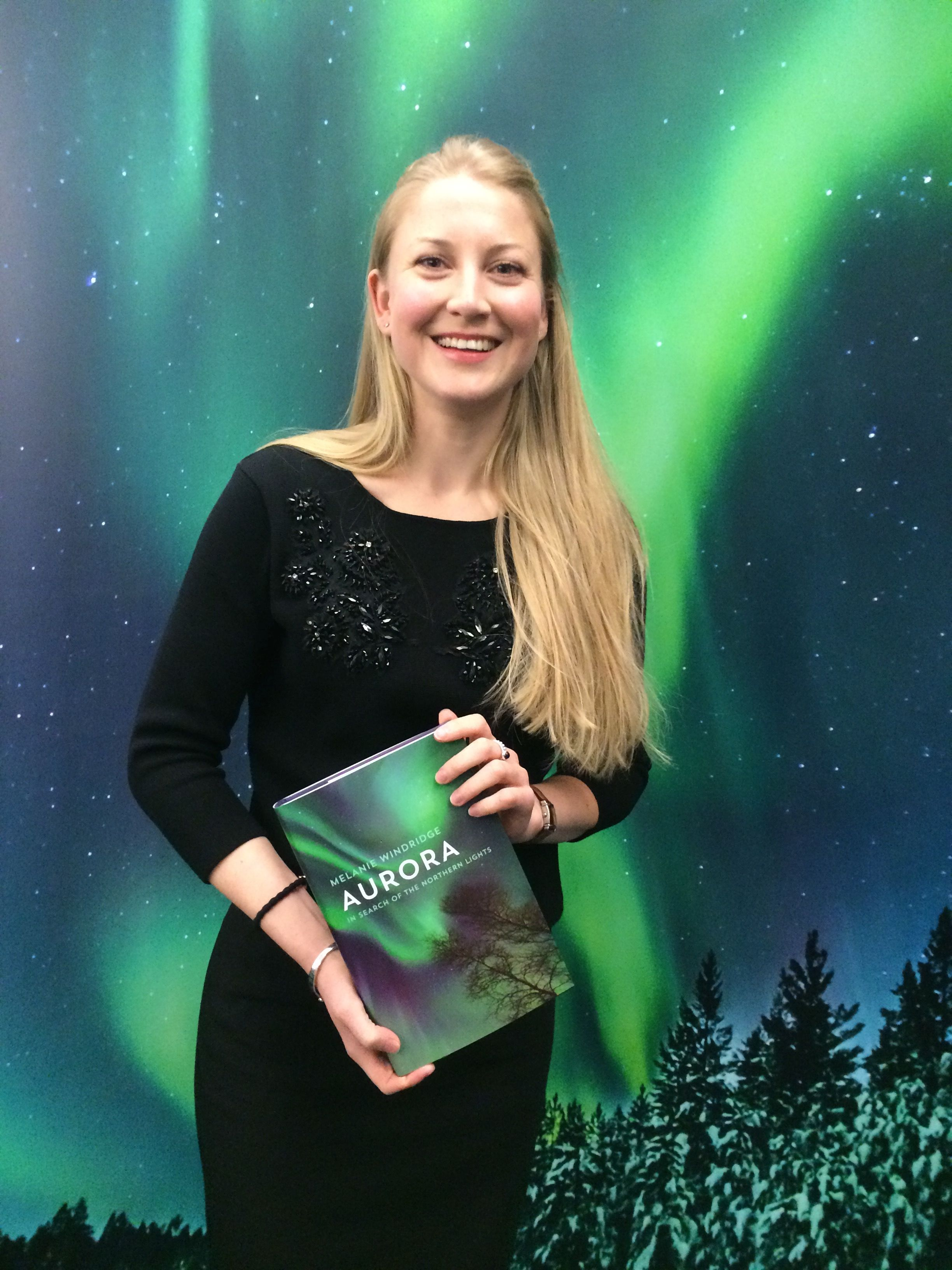
- Melanie Windridge with her book, Aurora, photographed before speaking at the Institute of Physics in London, UK, on 2 March 2016.
- Education: Ecole Nationale Superieure de Physique de Grenoble; Bristol University (MSc); Imperial College London (PhD)
- Known for: Books Aurora: In search of the Northern Lights and Star Chambers: The Race for Fusion Power
- Scientific career
- Fields: fusion energy, plasma physics

Melanie Windridge is a British plasma physicist and science communicator best known for her book Aurora: In Search of the Northern Lights and her educational work on fusion energy with the Institute of Physics and the Ogden Trust.

She is the CEO of Fusion Energy Insights.

== Early life ==
She attended Beaconsfield High School in Buckinghamshire, taking A-levels in Economics, Maths, Further Maths, and Physics in 1998. Her sister Rhian also attended.

Windridge graduated from Bristol University with an MSc in Physics in 2002. She spent her undergraduate third year in France at the Ecole Nationale Superieure de Physique de Grenoble. In 2009 she was awarded a PhD in Plasma Physics (specialising in fusion energy) from Imperial College London. Her thesis discussed the vertical stability of rings of plasma in spherical tokamaks and investigated one of the consequences of the ring becoming unstable – halo currents. This research was undertaken on the Mega Ampere Spherical Tokamak (MAST) at Culham Centre for Fusion Energy. Melanie showed that MAST plasmas may be more unstable to vertical disruptions than other tokamaks due to a combination of the magnetic field structure and the lack of a close-fitting wall.

== Career ==
Following her PhD, Windridge was chosen as the Institute of Physics Schools and Colleges Lecturer for 2010, which launched her science communication career. While travelling the country speaking to schools about fusion energy she wrote a collection of blogs on the subject, which were later published as an introductory book on fusion, Star Chambers: the Race for Fusion Power.

She subsequently worked with a Swiss start-up, Iprova, making inventions for high-profile clients, with whom she has various patents. She is currently named as an inventor on 8 patents for Philips spanning lighting, healthcare and medical devices.

Windridge is an academic visitor in the Plasma Physics group of Imperial College London. She is an Educational Consultant for the Ogden Trust, a founder advocate and ambassador of the Your Life campaign and a member of the Institute of Physics (IOP) Stimulating Physics Network Advisory Group. She is also a member of the IOP Science Communicators group and Women in Physics group. She won the STEM Ambassador Award 2015 from Science Oxford for her outreach work with schools.

Her interests include nuclear fusion, the aurora and exploration and she is a regular speaker on these subjects. In 2013 she embarked on a series of trips to the Arctic investigating the history, the science and the landscapes of the northern lights.

Windridge climbed Mount Everest in Spring 2018, reaching the summit on 21 May.

She is currently the Communications Consultant at Tokamak Energy.

== Books ==
=== Aurora: In search of the Northern Lights ===
Aurora explores the beauty of the Northern Lights. Windridge's book also features some of her journeys to Arctic destinations such as Sweden, Norway, Canada, Iceland and Svalbard. The book was published by William Collins in February 2016.

Windridge received the 2016 ASLI Choice Award in the Popular Category for Aurora, as well as the Institute of Physics' Rutherford Plasma Physics Communications Prize 2017.

=== Star Chambers: The Race for Fusion Power ===
Star Chambers discusses the basics of nuclear fusion and how it can be used to generate power. The book was based on blog posts written for the Institute of Physics and lectures given in 2010.
