= This Never Happened Before =

- Promo CD single

Promotional single by Paul McCartney

from the album Chaos and Creation in the Backyard
- B-side: "This Never Happened Before" (album version)
- Released: 2006
- Recorded: November 2003
- Studio: RAK, London
- Genre: Rock
- Length: 3:26 (album version); 3:13 (radio edit)
- Label: Capitol
- Songwriter: Paul McCartney
- Producer: Nigel Godrich

Paul McCartney promo singles chronology
"Lonely Road" (2002)	"This Never Happened Before" (2006)	"Sing the Changes" (2008)

"This Never Happened Before" is a song by English musician Paul McCartney, released as the twelfth track on his fourteenth studio album Chaos and Creation in the Backyard (2005).

== Background and composition ==
"This Never Happened Before" was written by Paul McCartney as a love song inspired by Burt Bacharach. He told Gary Crowley about the structure of the song in a Chaos and Creation in the Backyard interview disc:

It's [sic] Never Happened Before is a straight love song [...] The chords, it's always a big help if you get a nice little chord sequence and the opening chords to the verse of that go a nice place so they settle you down with your melody and you feel like you're going somewhere, so that was what was happening and wrote it and recorded it, one of the very first things we did with Nigel at Rak, that was one of the things to see if we could sort of get it on and I thought, 'This is good. We're going to go somewhere with this'.

— Paul McCartney, talking about the chord structure of "This Never Happened Before", Chaos and Creation in the Backyard Interview Disc

"This Never Happened Before" is in the key of E major, despite the song's vocal-piano songbook, which lists it as being in the key of A minor.

== Track listing ==
- Promo CD DPRO-49684-2
1. "This Never Happened Before" (edit 2) - 3:13
2. "This Never Happened Before" (album version) - 3:23

== Personnel ==
Per booklet.

- Paul McCartney – vocals, Yamaha grand piano, Höfner bass guitar, Epiphone Casino electric guitar, Ludwig drums
- Millennia Ensemble – strings, brass
- Joby Talbot – conducting, arrangement

== Use in media ==
"This Never Happened Before" was used in the 2006 film The Lake House and was included on the film's soundtrack album.

== Charts ==
Chart performance for "This Never Happened Before"
Chart (2005)	Peak position
US Adult Contemporary (Billboard)	27
