= Queenie, Queenie, who's got the ball? =

Children's game

"Queenie, Queenie, who's got the ball" is a common children's playground game. It is played with a ball by four or more players.

A girl is picked to be "Queenie," and she turns her back on everyone else. "Queenie" then throws the ball over her shoulder and one of the other players needs to catch it or pick it up. Everyone, except "Queenie", puts their hands behind their backs so that "Queenie" does not know who has the ball. "Queenie" then turns around and the others shout:

"Queenie, Queenie, who's got the ball?
Is she fat or is she tall?
Is she hairy, or is she bald?
You don't know because you don't have the ball!"

Another version of the chant is:

Queenio, Cokio, who's got the ballio?
I haven't got it
It isn't in my pocket
Queenio, Cokio, who's got the ballio?

Another version

Queenie Queenie who's got the ball, are they short or are they tall are they fat or are the thin or are they like a rolling pin. (East London 1950's)

The "Queenie" has to guess who has the ball through a process of elimination. If the girl with the ball is the last one to be picked, that girl becomes the new "queenie." The player must admit to having the ball or will automatically be "out". The player who is the "Queenie" must not look when throwing the ball or the "Queenie" herself will be "out".

== Popular culture ==
Paul McCartney's song Queenie Eye includes a variation of this chant as chorus lyrics.

Comic Peter Kay refers to the game during his Stand-Up comedy special ‘Live at the Top of the Tower’. Referencing a memory of his sister playing the game and reciting the lyrics: Queenio, Cokio, who’s got the ballio? It’s not in my pocket.

Benidorm tv show uncle Bertie reveals his identity to Kenneth by reciting the chant.
