= Beth Rigby =

British journalist, currently Sky News Political Editor

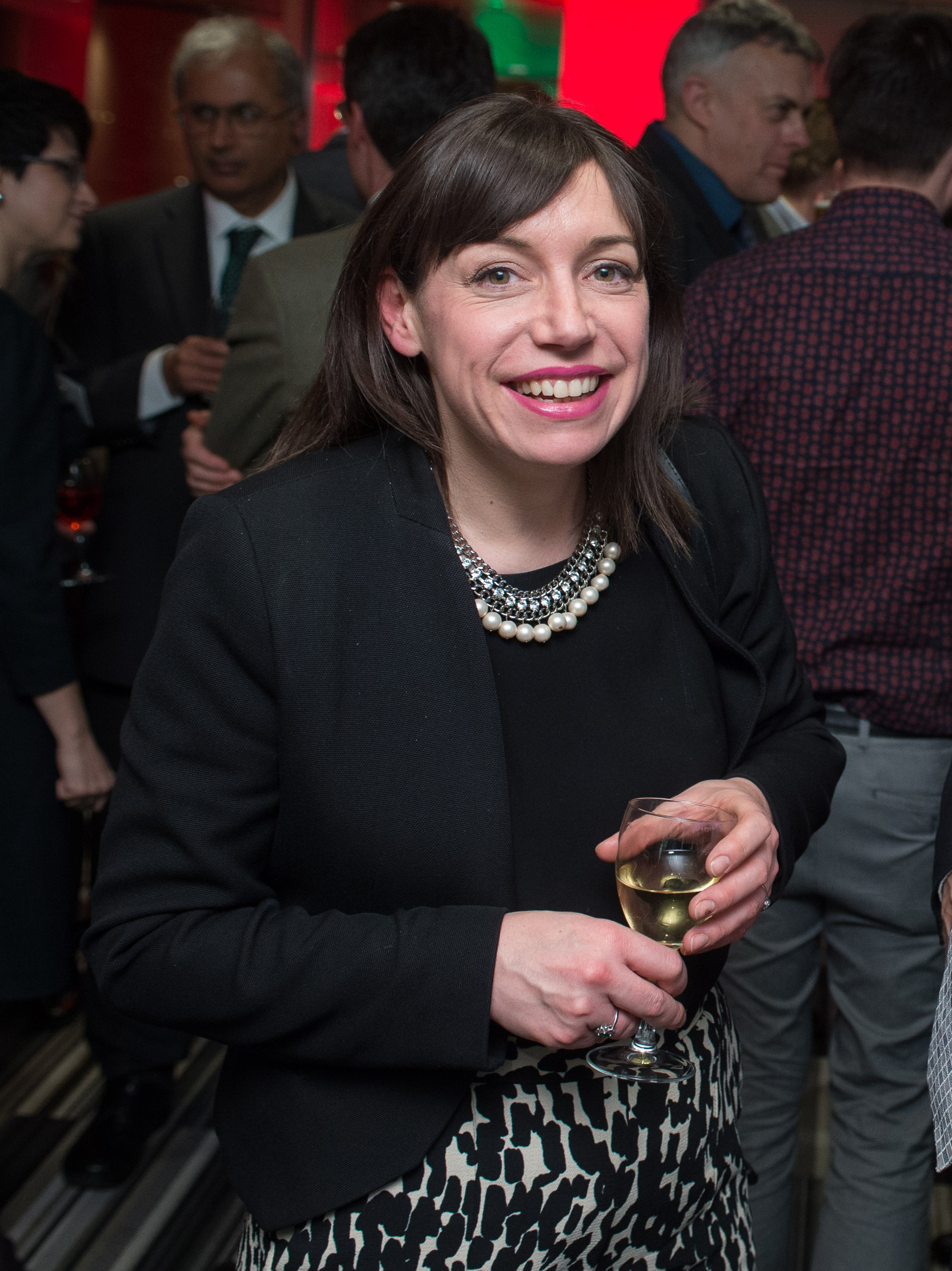
- Rigby in 2014
- Born: Elizabeth Frances Rigby; 19 February 1976 (age 50); Colchester, Essex, England
- Education: Beaconsfield High School
- Alma mater: Fitzwilliam College, Cambridge (BA); University of London (MA)
- Occupation: Journalist
- Years active: 2000–present
- Employer: Sky News (2016–present)
- Title: Political Editor
- Partner: Angelo Acanfora
- Children: 2

Elizabeth Frances Rigby (born 19 February 1976) is a British journalist. She has worked for Sky News since 2016, and was appointed Political Editor in 2019. Rigby has previously worked as a newspaper journalist for the Financial Times and The Times. Rigby presents a talk show on Thursday nights on Sky News called Beth Rigby Interviews, which launched in March 2022.

Rigby is a co-host of the weekly politics podcast Electoral Dysfunction, alongside Ruth Davidson and Harriet Harman. Jess Phillips was previously a co-host, but stepped down in July 2024 due to a government appointment. However, after resigning from her Ministerial office in June 2026, Phillips has begun to appear again on the podcast.

== Early life and education ==
Rigby was born in Colchester, Essex. She grew up in Buckinghamshire, and attended Beaconsfield High School, a girls' grammar school. Her father was a businessman and her mother was a headteacher from Makerfield. Rigby graduated with a first in social and political science from Fitzwilliam College, Cambridge. She went on to gain a master's degree in economics and development studies from the Institute of Latin American Studies at the University of London.

== Career ==
After graduation Rigby spent a period of time teaching English in Portugal, before joining the Financial Times as a graduate trainee in 1998. Her roles at the newspaper included hedge fund correspondent, retail correspondent and consumer industries editor, before she became chief political correspondent in 2010 and deputy political editor in January 2013. She joined The Times in 2015 as media editor before moving to Sky News in 2016, initially as senior political correspondent, before being promoted in July 2018 to deputy political editor. In February 2019 she was appointed political editor and took up the post on 12 April 2019, replacing Faisal Islam, who had joined BBC News as economics editor.

According to the i, Rigby is known for "her trademark dark bob and red lipstick, her distinctive diction and [...] her persistent questioning of senior politicians".

In December 2020 Rigby was criticised for breaching London's tier 2 COVID-19 restrictions by attending a restaurant to celebrate the birthday of Sky presenter Kay Burley, and was taken off air until March 2021. Rigby had offered to resign over the breach, later saying, "it was potentially damaging for the channel... it had upset my colleagues, and I felt absolutely wretched about that". John Ryley, the head of Sky News, declined her offer to resign.

Following Laura Kuenssberg's announcement of her departure as BBC News' political editor, Rigby was associated with the position. However, she stayed at Sky News and Chris Mason became the BBC's political editor. Rigby presented a talk show on Thursday nights on Sky News called Beth Rigby Interviews, which launched in March 2022 and ran for one season. During the 2024 general election, Rigby hosted a televised town hall leaders’ event on 12 June 2024 with Keir Starmer and Rishi Sunak, in which they took questions from an audience in Grimsby.

Rigby was twice shortlisted for the 2022 Royal Television Society awards for Political Journalist of the Year and Network Interview of the Year, for her exchange with Boris Johnson over parties in No 10.

Rigby won Political Journalist of Year at the 2024 Royal Television Society awards. The judges said of Rigby: "From a very strong set of entries, Beth Rigby was the stand-out winner. Her work is absolutely box office. She is always exciting to watch and her packaging is excellent, always asking the questions we are all yelling at the telly. She does a great democratic service and is a political editor at the top of her game".

Rigby won the inaugural Woman of the Year 2024 award (alongside Cathy Newman and Sam Poling) at the Women in Journalism awards for her "incisive election coverage". The judges described her as "a leading authority in an unpredictable political landscape".

Rigby currently hosts a weekly political podcast with Harriet Harman and Ruth Davidson called Electoral Dysfunction, which began on 1 March 2024. The show covers current affairs in British politics, notable for being a podcast with three women hosts in a male-dominated field.

== Personal life ==
She has two children with her partner Angelo Acanfora. She lives in north London.

Her mother died of lung cancer at the age of 62, and her brother Alex died of thymic carcinoma at the age of 42.

In 2025 she raised £18,000 for the North London Hospice by running the London Marathon, in memory of a friend. She ran the marathon again in 2026 for the same charity.

Media offices
Preceded by Faisal Islam	Political Editor of Sky News; 2019–present	Incumbent
