= New (album) =

Studio album by Paul McCartney
- Released: 11 October 2013
- Recorded: January 2012 – March 2013
- Studio: Henson (Los Angeles); Avatar (New York City); Abbey Road, AIR, and Wolf Tone (London); Hogg Hill Mill (Icklesham)
- Genre: Rock
- Length: 46:11
- Label: MPL; Hear Music; Universal
- Producer: Giles Martin; Paul Epworth; Ethan Johns; Mark Ronson

Paul McCartney chronology
Kisses on the Bottom (2012)	New (2013)	Pure McCartney (2016)

Paul McCartney studio album chronology
Kisses on the Bottom (2012)	New (2013)	Egypt Station (2018)

Singles from New
- 1. "New" Released: 2 September 2013; 2. "Queenie Eye" Released: 24 October 2013

New is the seventeenth solo studio album by English musician Paul McCartney, released on 11 October 2013 through MPL Communications, Hear Music, and Universal International. The album was his first since 2007's Memory Almost Full to consist entirely of new compositions.

The album was executive produced by Giles Martin, with production by Martin, Mark Ronson, Ethan Johns and Paul Epworth and it was mastered by Ted Jensen at Sterling Sound, New York. McCartney has stated that New was inspired by recent events in his life as well as memories of his pre-Beatles history. He added that some of the arrangements are unlike his usual rock recordings, and that he specifically sought out younger producers to work with. He and his stage band performed in various venues to promote the album, along with promotional events held through social media. It was McCartney's final album released on Hear Music before he returned to his old label Capitol Records.

The first single, "New", and the album were met with a generally favourable reception from music critics. The album peaked at number 3 on the UK Albums Chart and on the US Billboard 200.

== Recording ==
McCartney had initially intended to work on a trial basis with four of his favourite producers and select the best to record the whole album with. He ended up recording with all four: Mark Ronson, Ethan Johns, Paul Epworth and Giles Martin. Martin produced the majority of the tracks and acted as executive producer on the album. Recording took place at Henson Recording Studios in Los Angeles; Avatar Studios in New York; Abbey Road Studios, Air Studios and Wolf Tone Studios in London; and Hog Hill Mill in East Sussex. The recording sessions started in January 2012 with Paul Epworth (at Wolf Tone and The Mill) and then resumed at Abbey Road during February–March with other songs taped with Ethan Johns. The sessions with Ronson took place probably around January 2012, with work resuming in July and then later in 2013. Songs produced by Martin were recorded at AIR Studios during March 2013 and in Los Angeles, very likely during the spring, according to author Luca Perasi.

Ronson had been selected following his set as DJ at McCartney's wedding to Nancy Shevell two years before production began. The producer was preoccupied with his own wedding, which occurred at about the same time, and had almost forgotten to call McCartney back to accept the offer. A few months after Ronson served as DJ for another McCartney event in New York, Ronson received a call inviting him into the studio. In total Ronson recorded three tracks – "New", "Alligator" and "Secret Life of a Party Girl" – although the last of these does not appear on the album.

== Composition ==
I just started knocking something out on the piano, he started drumming to it, and I stuck a bit of bass on it and we had the basis of the song worked out.

— McCartney on songwriting with Paul Epworth, August 2013

Speaking to BBC News in August 2013, McCartney said that the album would be "very varied", adding: "I worked with four producers and each of them brought something different." The tracks produced by Epworth "weren't written" but improvised. McCartney remarked of "New" that it was "a love song but it's saying, 'Don't look at me, I haven't got any answers.' It says, 'I don't know what's happening, I don't know how it's all happening, but it's good and I love you.'"

Other tracks are autobiographical. McCartney wrote "On My Way to Work" about his pre-fame past, alluding to a time when he worked as a driver's mate for Speedy Prompt Delivery in Liverpool. On the day that McCartney composed "Early Days", he had been reminiscing about his past in Liverpool with John Lennon: "I started to get images of us in the record shop listening to early rock and roll and looking at the posters and the joy that that gave me remembering all those moments." The refrain of "Queenie Eye" was taken from a game McCartney used to play during his childhood.

Regarding contemporary inspiration, McCartney acknowledged that the album had been influenced by his marriage to Shevell, about which he said: "This is a happy period in my life, having a new woman – so you get new songs when you get a new woman." He felt that New was generally joyful, but with an undercurrent of "pain getting changed to laughter". Ronson referred to the track "Alligator" in particular as being "brooding" and "quite tough". McCartney revealed that "Alligator" was the oldest song on the album. McCartney wrote "Everybody Out There" specifically to "get the audience singing along"; he said that he was particularly proud of "Early Days" and the hidden track "Scared".

== Promotion ==
"New" was released as a single to the iTunes Store and SoundCloud on 28 August 2013. The single was accompanied by an announcement that the album would be released on 14 October in the United Kingdom, and a day later in the United States. A deluxe edition of New was also announced, featuring two bonus tracks. An official McCartney Instagram account launched at the same time as the album was revealed. McCartney debuted the songs "Save Us" and "Everybody Out There" at the third annual iHeartRadio Music Festival.

On 23 September, McCartney's news blog unveiled the final artwork for New, replacing the earlier minimal black-and-white logo used as a placeholder for online retailers. The logo and cover concept was conceived by UK art and design team Rebecca and Mike, with CGI created by Ben Ib. The imagery of fluorescent lights was inspired by the sculptural work of Dan Flavin. The titles of the deluxe edition bonus tracks were also announced as "Turned Out" and "Get Me Out of Here". Promotion later included a Twitter interview, on 4 October, when McCartney answered fan questions related to the album.

On 6 October, full-album listening events took place in the form of drive-ins: in the Los Angeles area, fans brought their vehicles to the Vinland Drive-In, while in New York City, listeners were taken to the rooftop of an Open Road Volkswagen dealership to sit in new cars belonging to the company. The drive-in idea came about late into the promotional campaign, when McCartney had been listening to the album in his own car about a week before the event took place.

On 10 October, McCartney and his band performed a surprise concert in New York's Times Square, after posting two short tweets announcing the event about an hour before it occurred. The fifteen-minute performance consisted of four tracks off the album: "New", "Save Us", "Everybody Out There" and "Queenie Eye". The event gathered a large crowd and came a day after another surprise concert to 400 students at the Frank Sinatra School of the Arts in Queens, New York. The latter performance was streamed on Yahoo! on 14 October. McCartney also performed songs from the album on Jimmy Kimmel Live and Late Night with Jimmy Fallon.

McCartney was a sponsor of the 2013 Kyushu honbasho, and the sleeve for New was displayed on banners during the tournament's final day on 24 November, with McCartney in attendance.

== Reception ==
Professional ratings
Aggregate scores
Source	Rating
Metacritic	77/100
Review scores
Source	Rating
AllMusic	4/5 stars
Clash	7/10
The Daily Telegraph	5/5 stars
Entertainment Weekly	A−
The Guardian	3/5 stars
NME	7/10
Pitchfork	7.8/10
PopMatters	7/10
Rolling Stone	4/5 stars
Slant Magazine	2.5/5 stars

"New" was selected as BBC Radio 2's "Record of the Week" and received praise from Mojo magazine, Rolling Stone and The Daily Telegraph. Writing for Rolling Stone, Will Hermes admired the song's "bouncy harpsichord-laden melody" and likened the track to the Beatles' "Got to Get You into My Life".

The album received generally favourable reviews, according to Metacritic's aggregate score of 77 (out of 100), compiled from a sample of 31 music critics. In his review for PopMatters, J.C. Maçek III wrote: "New is no Abbey Road, but it is a remarkable album from the 71-year-old version of the man who has brought us decades of great rock 'n' roll songs." In Rolling Stone, Will Hermes opined: "New feels energized and full of joyous rock & roll invention. More than a sentimental journey, it's an album that wants to be part of the 21st-century pop dialogue." Hermes highlighted "On My Way to Work" as "[t]he most Beatles-ish track" and described "Early Days" as "the head turner … a wistful, mostly acoustic memoir-reverie echoing George Harrison's 'All Those Years Ago,' albeit with some genteel bitchiness". In December that year, Rolling Stone ranked New the 4th best album of 2013.

Helen Brown of The Daily Telegraph noted McCartney's "fresh attitude" compared with the more introspective Memory Almost Full, and added that "Though they're produced by men young enough to be his sons, these 12 songs are vintage Macca …" Brown wrote of the singer's efforts to address his past: "He needn't be so defensive, or so concerned about detractors – this album proves his talent is timeless."

Less impressed, Jesse Cataldo of the website Slant Magazine identified the album's "defining condition" as the same "middling, innocuous quality" typical of McCartney's solo career, and bemoaned that none of the four producers had "any real idea of how to adequately update his sound". Cataldo welcomed the songs that showed McCartney "at war with himself", and concluded: "while the brave-faced, sunny music that defines the album's back half may be as contrived as his jolly public persona, it's the touches of humanizing anxiety that make New significant, revealing active signs of creative life." Writing for the NME, Barry Nicolson considered the album to be McCartney's "most enjoyable record in years" and, contrary to the title, "the sound of an old dog having fun with some old tricks". While also highlighting the Ronson-produced tracks "New" and "Alligator", Nicolson remarked on the Beatles influence on "Early Days", but found the latter song "marred by McCartney's longstanding preoccupation with ensuring everyone knows he was John Lennon's equal".

== Commercial performance ==
The album debuted at number 3 on both the Billboard 200 and Billboard Canadian Albums in North American charts, with first-week sales of 67,000 copies in the United States and 8,500 units in Canada, respectively. The album has sold 217,000 copies in the United States as of May 2016.

"New" received extensive airplay on Japanese radio stations, also peaking at number 4 on the country's Hot 100. Anticipation for McCartney's subsequent tour also boosted sales of New in Japan, providing the artist with his first album to chart in the top three positions there since Tug of War in 1982. The album reached the top five in at least ten countries; in Norway, McCartney topped the chart for the first time since his album Flowers in the Dirt in 1989. By the end of 2013, 15,000 copies of New had been sold in Brazil.

== Track listing ==
All tracks are written by Paul McCartney, except where noted.

New – standard edition
No.	Title	Writer(s)	Producer(s)	Length
1.	"Save Us"	Paul McCartney; Paul Epworth	Paul Epworth	2:39
2.	"Alligator"		Mark Ronson	3:27
3.	"On My Way to Work"		Giles Martin	3:43
4.	"Queenie Eye"	Paul McCartney; Paul Epworth	Epworth	3:47
5.	"Early Days"		Ethan Johns	4:07
6.	"New"		Ronson	2:56
7.	"Appreciate"		Martin	4:28
8.	"Everybody Out There"		Martin	3:21
9.	"Hosanna"		Johns	3:29
10.	"I Can Bet"		Martin	3:21
11.	"Looking at Her"		Martin	3:05
12.	"Road" "Scared" (hidden track)	Paul McCartney; Paul Epworth	Epworth; Martin	7:39
Total length:				46:11

== Other editions ==
A deluxe edition was released with two bonus tracks, "Turned Out" and "Get Me Out of Here". The Target version comes packaged with a DVD featuring the 22-minute documentary A Rendez-Vous with Paul McCartney.

The special collector's edition, released in 2014, is a 2CD/DVD reissue of New. It contains exclusive content that tells the story of the making of the album as well as capturing unique moments during the international promotion campaign, such as concerts, pop up shows in New York and London, an album Q&A filmed at The Shard in London, chat show performances and footage of a signing session at HMV's flagship store in London. The second CD includes two previously unreleased tracks ("Hell to Pay" and "Demons Dance") taken from the album recording sessions as well featuring 'Struggle' which was previously released as a Japanese bonus track. The second CD also includes live versions of "Save Us", "New", "Queenie Eye" and "Everybody Out There" recorded at the Tokyo Dome, Japan in November 2013.

The DVD contains a documentary Something New directed by Don Letts, a collection of behind-the-scenes footage from the international promotional trail, and music videos for "Queenie Eye", "Save Us", "Appreciate" and "Early Days". Also included is footage from the making of the "Queenie Eye", "Appreciate" and "Early Days" videos

=== Track listing ===
New – deluxe and collector's editions bonus tracks
No.	Title	Producer(s)	Length
13.	"Turned Out"	Johns, additional work by Martin	2:59
14.	"Get Me Out of Here" (includes "Scared" as a hidden track)	Martin	6:15

New – Collector's edition bonus disc
No.	Title	Producer(s)	Length
1.	"Struggle"	Epworth	4:50
2.	"Hell to Pay"	Giles Martin	4:00
3.	"Demons Dance"	Ethan Johns	3:51
4.	"Save Us" (live at Tokyo Dome 2013)		2:41
5.	"New" (live at Tokyo Dome 2013)		2:40
6.	"Queenie Eye" (live at Tokyo Dome 2013)		3:42
7.	"Everybody Out There" (live at Tokyo Dome 2013)		3:50
Total length:			25:35

== Personnel ==
Adapted from liner notes.

- Paul McCartney – vocals (1–14), guitars (1–5, 8–11, 13, 14), bass guitar (1–4, 6, 8–13), percussion (2, 4–6, 10–13), synthesizer (2, 4, 10, 11, 13), celeste (2, 12), glockenspiel (2), Play-Me-A-Song book (2), cigar box guitar (3, 7), piano (4, 6, 8, 12), drums (3, 7, 10, 11, 13), lap steel guitar (4), Mellotron (4, 6, 8, 11), upright bass (5), harmonium (5), harpsichord (6), Fender Rhodes electric piano (6, 10), bouzouki (6), keyboards (7, 8, 12, 13), tape loops (9, 10), tubular bells (13); ngoni, washboard, and thimbles (14)
- Rusty Anderson – guitars (2, 3, 5–8, 10, 11, 13), bouzouki (6, 7), backing vocals (6, 7), water bottle (14)
- Brian Ray – guitars (2, 3, 6–8, 13), dulcimer (5), backing vocals (6, 7, 14), baritone guitar (7), congas (14)
- Paul Wickens – keyboards (2), guitars (3), piano (3), accordion (3), backing vocals (6), Hammond organ (10)
- Abe Laboriel Jr. – drums (2, 6–8, 13), backing vocals (5–7, 13, 14), djembe (14)
- Steve Sidwell – trumpet
- Jamie Talbot – tenor saxophone
- Dave Bishop – baritone saxophone
- Toby Pitman – programming (3, 7, 8, 10, 11), keyboards (8, 11)
- Ethan Johns – drums (5), percussion (5), iPad Tambora app (9), guitar (13)
- Paul Epworth – drums (1, 4, 12)
- Giles Martin – foot stamp (8)
- McCartney Family Chorus (8)
- Eliza Marshall, Anna Noakes – flute (8)
- Cathy Thompson, Laura Melhuish, Patrick Kiernan, Nina Foster – violin
- Peter Lale, Rachel Robsin – viola
- Caroline Dale, Katherine Jenkinson, Chris Worsey – cello
- Richard Pryce, Steve McManus – double bass

== Charts and certifications ==
=== Weekly charts ===
Chart (2013)	Peak position
Australian Albums (ARIA)	22
Austrian Albums (Ö3 Austria)	6
Belgian Albums (Ultratop Flanders)	6
Belgian Albums (Ultratop Wallonia)	3
Canadian Albums (Billboard)	3
Croatian International Albums (HDU)	5
Danish Albums (Hitlisten)	2
Dutch Albums (Album Top 100)	6
Finnish Albums (Suomen virallinen lista)	27
French Albums (SNEP)	2
German Albums (Offizielle Top 100)	6
Hungarian Albums (MAHASZ)	18
Irish Albums (IRMA)	12
Italian Albums (FIMI)	4
Japanese Albums (Oricon)	2
New Zealand Albums (RMNZ)	27
Norwegian Albums (VG-lista)	1
Polish Albums (ZPAV)	18
Scottish Albums (Official Charts)	3
Spanish Albums (Promusicae)	8
Swedish Albums (Sverigetopplistan)	9
Swiss Albums (Schweizer Hitparade)	12
UK Albums (Official Charts)	3
US Billboard 200	3
US Top Rock Albums (Billboard)	2

=== Year-end charts ===
Chart (2013)	Position
Belgian Albums (Ultratop Flanders)	167
Belgian Albums (Ultratop Wallonia)	101
Danish Albums (Hitlisten)	85
French Albums (SNEP)	161
Japanese Albums (Oricon)	93
US Top Rock Albums (Billboard)	56
Chart (2014)	Position
US Top Rock Albums (Billboard)	66

=== Certifications and sales ===
Region	Certification	Certified units/sales
Japan (RIAJ)	Gold	100,000^{^}
Poland (ZPAV)	Gold	10,000^{*}
United States	—	217,000
^{*} Sales figures based on certification alone.^{^} Shipments figures based on certification alone.

== Release history ==
Region	Date	Format	Label
Germany	11 October 2013	Digital download	MPL/Hear Music/Universal
Australia	11 October 2013	Digital download	MPL/Hear Music/Universal
South Korea	14 October 2013	Digital download	Universal
United Kingdom	14 October 2013	Digital download	MPL/Hear Music/Universal
United States	15 October 2013	Digital download	MPL/Hear Music/Universal
