= Kate Royal =

English opera singer

Kate Royal (born April 1979) is an English lyric soprano.

Kate Laura Royal was born in London and attended Talbot Heath School in Bournemouth, Dorset. She later studied at the Guildhall School of Music and Drama and then the National Opera Studio, graduating in the summer of 2004. In that same year, she won the Kathleen Ferrier Award.

Royal began to attract wider notice as an understudy for the role of Pamina in Mozart's Die Zauberflöte at Glyndebourne Festival Opera in 2004, when she replaced the lead soprano at one performance. With Glyndebourne on Tour, she has sung the Countess in Le nozze di Figaro. She has performed in recital with the pianists Graham Johnson and Roger Vignoles. In 2006 with Glyndebourne on Tour, she sang The Governess in Benjamin Britten's The Turn of the Screw. Later the same year, she signed a recording contract with EMI Classics, and her first disc of songs and arias was released in September 2007. She dedicates five months per year to song recitals.

Royal and her husband, actor and singer Julian Ovenden, have a son and a daughter. The couple married in December 2010, officiated by Ovenden's father, Canon John Ovenden.

== Discography ==
Solo

- Kate Royal: Academy of St Martin in the Fields, Edward Gardner (EMI Classics, 2007)
- The Songs of Robert Schumann Vol. 10: Eichendorff Liederkreis, Op 39, with Graham Johnson, Felicity Lott, and Ann Murray (Hyperion, 2007)
- Midsummer Night: Orchestra of English National Opera & Crouch End Festival Chorus, Edward Gardner (2007) EMI Records Ltd. Barcode 0094639441952
- A Lesson in Love, with Malcolm Martineau (piano) (EMI 2010)

Other

- Ian Bostridge featuring Kate Royal: Great Handel (EMI Classics, 2007)
- Paul McCartney featuring Kate Royal: Ecce Cor Meum (EMI Classics, 2006)
- Choir of King's College, Cambridge featuring Kate Royal: Purcell: Music for Queen Mary
- DVD Paul McCartney: Ecce Cor Meum (2007)
- DVD Mozart: Die Zauberflöte, 2013 Easter Festival in Baden-Baden (2013)
