= Jane Treays =

British documentary maker

- Born: Cornwall, England
- Occupation: Documentary filmmaker
- Years active: 1984–present
- Known for: Inside Claridge's, Painted Babies, The Queen’s Green Planet
- Partner: David Pearson (divorced)
- Children: 2

Jane Treays is a British documentary film maker best known for her observational documentaries for the BBC and Channel 4, including Inside Claridge’s (2012) and Painted Babies (1996).

== Early career ==
In 1984, Treays was a researcher working on documentaries for the BBC. She worked on the series Our House. In 1988, she produced The Diary of Jack Dancy for Timewatch. In 1995, she produced Situation Vacant, about the endurance test for the Royal Marines (a six-part series for BBC Two).

== Films ==
- I Don't Want to Be Remembered as a Chair (1990, Timewatch), about the Shakers
- Painted Babies (1996), about child beauty pageants, which was watched by 3.5 million people
- Under the Sun (BBC Two, 1998), about a male prostitute in Melbourne
- Agas and Their Owners (BBC Two, 1998), "a quaint study of English class attitude"
- Public Enemy: Mother and Son (ITV, 1999), about Sante Kimes
- One Man, Six Wives and 29 Children: Real Life, about polygyny
- Ken and Me, about William Roache and Ken Barlow (2000)
- True Stories: Men in the Woods (Channel 4, 2001), about flashers
- This Model Life, about fashion models, including Daphne Selfe and Ruth Crilly
- Extraordinary Families: The Seven Wives of Alexander Spencer (Channel 4, 2005), about bigamy
- What Sort of Gentleman Are You After?, about male prostitution
- A Child's Life: Aged 12, and Looking After the Family (Channel 4, 2007), about young carers
- The Man with the 7-Second Memory, about Clive Wearing
- The Virgin Daughters (2008), about the American purity movement
- Mum, Heroin and Me (2008)
- Inside Claridge's (2012)
- Land of Hope and Glory: British Country Life (2016, BBC Two), about the magazine Country Life
- The Queen's Green Planet (2018, ITV)

Treays made a film about travelling with The Rolling Stones on tour, but it has not been broadcast.

== Critical response ==
Treays has been described as "a film-maker unafraid to ask a blunt question and capture a telling moment". She has been compared to Molly Dineen, Lucy Blakstad and Nick Broomfield.

John Crace, in The Guardian, wrote of her 2012 documentary Inside Claridges, "Director Jane Treays never actually appeared on camera, but she was a presence throughout with her off-screen questions. Unlike some documentary-makers who have the knack of putting their subjects on the defensive, she gnawed away at hers with love and was repaid time and again with delightful indiscretions ... Nor did Treays shy away from asking the difficult questions".

Treays has said of her film-making, "I got better at it when I had children and I've got better since I've been divorced because of the sadness I felt. If I'd never experienced pain or sadness I would find it hard to identify. Documentary-making is an area people get better at as they get older. You have to know yourself. You have to be very tender in your relationship with the person you're making a film about ... everything I do is made with love and is about love in its many different forms and perversions."

Her film True Stories: Men in the Woods (2001) was described by Gareth McLean in The Guardian as "On the whole interesting ... [but] Occasionally melodramatic and self-indulgent". Anita Biressi and Heather Nunn place it within the genre of feminist autobiography and write that "the fantasy nature precisely depicted the act of telling and retelling a traumatic childhood event".

== Personal life ==
Treays is Cornish. She was married to David Pearson, also a film-maker. They have two children, and are divorced.
