= Paul McCartney in Red Square =

Video by Paul McCartney
- Released: 14 June 2005
- Recorded: 24 May 2003; 20 June 2004
- Genre: Rock
- Length: 153 min.
- Label: MPL; A&E Home Video
- Director: Mark Haefeli
- Producer: Paul McCartney; Mark Haefeli; David Kahne (music producer)

Paul McCartney chronology
Wingspan (2001)	Paul McCartney in Red Square (2005)	The Space Within US (2006)

Paul McCartney in Red Square is a live DVD by Paul McCartney, directed by Mark Haefeli and released in June 2005. It features footage of McCartney's concerts in Moscow's Red Square and Saint Petersburg's Palace Square, interspersed with interviews from McCartney and others narrating how The Beatles’ music contributed to the decline of communism.

Both Paul McCartney in Red Square and Paul McCartney in St. Petersburg earned Mark Haefeli Grammy nominations for 'Best Music, Variety and Comedy Special". Paul McCartney in Red Square also won The Mipcon for Best DVD of the year in 2007.

== Songs – In Red Square ==
1. "Getting Better"
2. "Band on the Run"
3. "Can't Buy Me Love"
4. "Two of Us"
5. "I Saw Her Standing There"
6. "We Can Work It Out"
7. "I've Just Seen A Face"
8. "Live And Let Die"
9. "Let 'Em In"
10. "The Fool on the Hill"
11. "Things We Said Today"
12. "Birthday"
13. "Maybe I'm Amazed"
14. "Back in the U.S.S.R."
15. "Calico Skies"
16. "Hey Jude"
17. "She's Leaving Home"
18. "Yesterday"
19. "Let It Be"
20. "Back in the U.S.S.R. (Reprise)"

== Songs – St. Petersburg ==
1. Intro
2. "Jet"
3. "Got to Get You into My Life"
4. "Flaming Pie"
5. "Let Me Roll It"
6. "Drive My Car"
7. "Penny Lane"
8. "Get Back"
9. "Back in the U.S.S.R."
10. "I've Got a Feeling"
11. "Sgt. Pepper's Lonely Hearts Club Band (Reprise)"/"The End"
12. "Helter Skelter"

== Personnel ==
- Paul McCartney – lead vocals, bass guitar, electric and acoustic guitars, piano
- Brian Ray – rhythm guitar, bass guitar, backing vocals
- Rusty Anderson – lead guitar, backing vocals
- Abe Laboriel Jr. – drums, backing vocals
- Wix Wickens – keyboards, backing vocals

== Charts ==
Chart (2005)	Peak position
Australian Music DVDs Chart	3
Belgian (Wallonia) Music DVDs Chart	9
Danish Music DVDs Chart	6
Dutch Music DVDs Chart	12
Hungarian Music DVDs Chart	4
Italian Music DVDs Chart	3
New Zealand Music DVDs Chart	5
Norwegian Music DVDs Chart	10
Spanish Music DVDs Chart	11
US Music Videos Chart	2

== Certifications ==
Region	Certification	Certified units/sales
Argentina (CAPIF)	Platinum	8,000^{^}
Australia (ARIA)	2× Platinum	30,000^{^}
Canada (Music Canada)	2× Platinum	20,000^{^}
United States (RIAA)	Platinum	100,000^{^}
^{^} Shipments figures based on certification alone.
