= Too Much Rain =

Song by Paul McCartney

from the album Chaos and Creation in the Backyard
- Released: 12 September 2005
- Studio: AIR, London
- Genre: Rock
- Length: 3:24
- Label: Parlophone; Capitol; EMI
- Songwriter: Paul McCartney
- Producer: Nigel Godrich

"Too Much Rain" is a song by Paul McCartney and is the seventh track on his 2005 album Chaos and Creation in the Backyard. The song was recorded at George Martin's AIR Studios in central London with producer Nigel Godrich. It was inspired by the theme to the 1936 film Modern Times, written by Charlie Chaplin and commonly known as "Smile" (lyrics were added to Smile in 1954 by John Turner and Geoffrey Parsons).

The lyrics of "Too Much Rain" concern hope in the face of adversity ("Laugh when your eyes are burning/Smile when your heart is filled with pain..."). In addition to "Smile," McCartney has said the song was also inspired by his second wife, Heather Mills, who had "a lot of tough times in her life."
