= Chaos and Creation in the Backyard =

- Cover photo by Mike McCartney

Studio album by Paul McCartney
- Released: 12 September 2005
- Recorded: September 2003 – April 2005
- Studios: RAK (London); AIR (London); Ocean Way (Hollywood)
- Genre: Rock
- Length: 46:53
- Labels: Parlophone (UK); Capitol (US); Capitol Records/Universal Music Enterprises (2018 reissue)
- Producer: Nigel Godrich

Paul McCartney chronology
Twin Freaks (2005)	Chaos and Creation in the Backyard (2005)	Never Stop Doing What You Love (2005)

Paul McCartney studio album chronology
Driving Rain (2001)	Chaos and Creation in the Backyard (2005)	Memory Almost Full (2007)

Singles from Chaos and Creation in the Backyard
- 1. "Fine Line" Released: 29 August 2005; 2. "Jenny Wren" Released: 21 November 2005

Alternative cover
- Special Edition paper sleeve (CD with DVD). It features an ambigram of McCartney's name.

Chaos and Creation in the Backyard is the fourteenth solo studio album by Paul McCartney, released on 12 and 13 September 2005. Some 18 months in the making, the album was produced by Radiohead and Beck collaborator Nigel Godrich at George Martin's suggestion.

McCartney plays almost all of the instruments, similar to his 1970 album McCartney, the 1980 McCartney II album and the 2020 McCartney III album. In addition, Chaos and Creation in the Backyard marks the first time since 1984's Give My Regards to Broad Street that McCartney was not credited as producer or co-producer of one of his studio albums.

Chaos and Creation in the Backyard was McCartney's last rock album release for longtime label EMI. He signed a deal with Hear Music, owned by Starbucks, in March 2007. He later returned to his old label Capitol Records in 2016.

== Production ==
Upon being asked to produce an album with McCartney, Godrich admitted, "My initial reaction was one of terror, not only because it's a very important person, but I really wasn't sure how willing he would be to get his hands dirty."

The two tentatively began a collaboration, recording the songs "This Never Happened Before" and "Follow Me" which was enough to convince both of them that they could develop an album. Godrich's participation was active: he inspired McCartney to write the song "At the Mercy", added piano loops on "How Kind of You" and worked with McCartney to slow the tempo of "Riding to Vanity Fair" which McCartney says "changed the mood completely".

Although initially taken aback, McCartney appreciated Godrich's tenacity and honesty. "I've been on a lot of records, on my own, I've had a lot of hits. He said, 'I just want to make a great album, and for the album to be you', Once we got in the studio, and we're playing head to head on a couple of songs that I thought as good and he didn't, I thought of immediately firing him. I just thought, 'I don't have to take this.' But the point is, 'This is why you're working with him.'"

According to McCartney, Godrich was at times blunt in his appraisal of McCartney's songs-in-progress during the making of Chaos and Creation in the Backyard:

Nigel ... refused to allow me to sing songs that he didn't like, which was very cheeky of him.

== Recording ==
Recording sessions for the album covered a period of some 18 months, with many pauses. First sessions were held at RAK Studios, London in September 2003 by McCartney and his band. After a few takes, Godrich said to McCartney he wanted to work with him alone, not involving the band. After some months' break, sessions resumed at Ocean Way Studios, Los Angeles in April 2004, with more sessions in September. Final recordings took place at AIR Studios, London in April 2005.

== Artwork ==
The cover for Chaos and Creation in the Backyard is from a photograph of McCartney strumming a guitar in his family's back yard at 20 Forthlin Road, Liverpool, taken in 1962 by his brother Mike McCartney (aka Mike McGear) and originally titled Paul Under Washing, before being retitled Our Kid Through Mum's Net Curtains.

== Release and promotion ==
The first single, the upbeat "Fine Line", was released in late August 2005, ahead of the release of Chaos and Creation in the Backyard, and reached No. 20 in the UK. A second single, "Jenny Wren", reached No. 22 in the UK that November. "Fine Line" and "Jenny Wren" appeared on singles with their running time shortened. The singles also included five non-album b-sides: "Comfort of Love", "Growing Up Falling Down" ("Fine Line"), "Summer of '59" (vinyl edition of "Jenny Wren"), "This Loving Game" and "I Want You to Fly" (CD edition of "Jenny Wren").

The Japanese CD release of the album included the song "She Is So Beautiful". The song was also offered as a free download in Windows Media Audio format to US customers who purchased the CD at Target stores. Other bonus downloadable songs were made available to people who bought the CD at certain other stores, such as Best Buy and Wal-Mart. PaulMcCartney.com offered an exclusive download of the live version of "Jenny Wren".

The 'US' Tour in 2005 helped to promote the album in the US and Canada.

There was also a promotional concert for the album held at Abbey Road Studios, called Chaos and Creation at Abbey Road. During the show McCartney played acoustic versions of various songs, demonstrated some instruments and told stories. At the end he and the audience recorded a short track together.

The album was reissued in 2018 on vinyl in black and gold editions.

== Reception ==
Professional ratings
Aggregate scores
Source	Rating
Metacritic	78/100
Review scores
Source	Rating
AllMusic	4/5 stars
Entertainment Weekly	B
The Guardian	4/5 stars
Los Angeles Times	3/4 stars
Mojo	3/5 stars
NME	6/10
Q	3/5 stars
Rolling Stone	4/5 stars
Uncut	4/5 stars
USA Today	3/4 stars

At Metacritic, the album holds an average Metascore of 78 out of 100, based on 19 reviews, which indicates a generally favourable reception. Reviewing for the BBC, Daryl Easlea described Chaos and Creation as "Very, very good", and added: "'Riding to Vanity Fair', 'Too Much Rain', 'Anyway' and 'How Kind of You' are full of subtle nuances, killer hooks and sweet surprises. They really do rank among his very best work." In The New York Times, Jon Pareles wrote that McCartney's return to a multi-instrumentalist role "makes the songs more intimate and less conventional", while remarking of the project: "Sir Paul chose a producer who favored the experimental side: Nigel Godrich … Sir Paul also lined up his best backup band since the Beatles: himself." AllMusic's Stephen Thomas Erlewine argued the album, along with its predecessors Flaming Pie (1997), Run Devil Run (1999) and Driving Rain (2001), represented a late-career renaissance for McCartney. He also felt Chaos was a more cohesive record than Flaming Pie, further praising Chaos's meditative and reflective mood throughout.

In the US, Chaos and Creation in the Backyard debuted at No. 6 on the Billboard 200 with sales of 91,545 copies. It stayed on chart for a total of 21 weeks, selling over 530,000 copies up to 2007. In the UK, the album peaked at No. 10 with cumulative sales of around 45,000 units. According to the annual report published by EMI, Chaos and Creation in the Backyard had sold 1.3 million copies worldwide by the end of March 2006. The album received four Grammy nominations at the 48th Annual Grammy Awards in 2006, including a nomination for Album of the Year.

== Track listing ==
All tracks are written by Paul McCartney.

Chaos and Creation in the Backyard track listing
No.	Title	Length
1.	"Fine Line"	3:06
2.	"How Kind of You"	4:48
3.	"Jenny Wren"	3:47
4.	"At the Mercy"	2:38
5.	"Friends to Go"	2:44
6.	"English Tea"	2:12
7.	"Too Much Rain"	3:25
8.	"A Certain Softness"	2:42
9.	"Riding to Vanity Fair"	5:07
10.	"Follow Me"	2:32
11.	"Promise to You Girl"	3:10
12.	"This Never Happened Before"	3:25
13.	"Anyway"	3:52
14.	"I've Only Got Two Hands" (unlisted instrumental)	3:15
Total length:		46:53

Japanese edition bonus track
No.	Title	Length
15.	"She Is So Beautiful"	3:01
Total length:		49:54

=== Special edition DVD ===
- "Between Chaos and Creation" – Documentary (30 mins)
- "Fine Line" – Studio Performance Video (4 mins)
- "Line Art" – 12 Minute Animated Film – drawings by the artist Brian Clarke. Animation by Momoco. (Includes 3 instrumental tracks: "Riding To Vanity Fair", "At the Mercy" and "Anyway").
- "How Kind of You" – DVD Menu (5 mins)
- Executive producer: Paul McCartney
- Director and editor: Simon Hilton
- Producer: James Chads
- Production company: Maguffin
- DVD mastering: Abbey Road Interactive

== Personnel ==
Personnel per booklet.

Musicians

- Paul McCartney – acoustic guitar, autoharp, Baldwin spinet, bass guitar, cello, classical guitar, drums, drum machine, electric guitar, electric piano, flugelhorn, gong, güiro, harmonium, acoustic guitar loops, maracas, melodica, moog synthesizer, B3 organ, tambourine on snare, recorders, tubular bells, 12 string guitar, tambourine, triangle, toy glockenspiel, percussion, piano, vibrachimes, violin, vocals, woodblock.
- Millennia Ensemble – strings, brass instrument
- Joby Talbot – string arrangement, conducting, brass arrangement
- Nigel Godrich – piano and Epiphone acoustic guitar loops
- Pedro Eustache – duduk
- Jason Falkner – electric guitar, classical guitar
- James Gadson – drums
- Joey Waronker – bass drum, bongos, shaker
- The Los Angeles Music Players – strings
- David Campbell – string arrangement
- Rusty Anderson – acoustic guitar
- Brian Ray – acoustic guitar
- Abe Laboriel Jr. – percussion, block, tambourine

Production

- Nigel Godrich – producer
- Dan Grech-Marguerat – production assistant
- Darrell Thorp – engineer
- Alan Yoshida – mastering
- Photo of Paul Mccartney taken by Mike McCartney, Paul's brother – cover
- Brian Clarke – inlay
- Bill Bernstein – back cover
- Paul McCartney, Stylorouge London – art direction

== Accolades ==
=== Grammy Awards ===
Year	Nominee / work	Award	Result
2006	Chaos and Creation in the Backyard	Album of the Year	Nominated
2006	Chaos and Creation in the Backyard	Best Pop Vocal Album	Nominated
2006	"Fine Line"	Best Male Pop Vocal Performance	Nominated
2006	Nigel Godrich	Non-Classical Producer of the Year	Nominated
2007	"Jenny Wren"	Best Male Pop Vocal Performance	Nominated

== Charts ==
=== Weekly charts ===
Weekly chart performance for Chaos and Creation in the Backyard
Chart (2005–2006)	Peak position
Australian Albums (ARIA)	33
Austrian Albums (Ö3 Austria)	13
Belgian Albums (Ultratop Flanders)	15
Belgian Albums (Ultratop Wallonia)	10
Canadian Albums (Billboard)	6
Danish Albums (Hitlisten)	5
Dutch Albums (Album Top 100)	8
Finnish Albums (Suomen virallinen lista)	20
French Albums (SNEP)	3
German Albums (Offizielle Top 100)	4
Irish Albums (IRMA)	32
Italian Albums (FIMI)	3
Japanese Albums (Oricon)	19
Norwegian Albums (VG-lista)	8
Scottish Albums (Official Charts)	9
Spanish Albums (Promusicae)	9
Swedish Albums (Sverigetopplistan)	3
Swiss Albums (Schweizer Hitparade)	9
UK Albums (Official Charts)	10
US Billboard 200	6

=== Year-end charts ===
Year-end chart performance for Chaos and Creation in the Backyard
Chart (2005)	Position
French Albums (SNEP)	103

== Certifications and sales ==
Certifications and sales for Chaos and Creation in the Backyard
Region	Certification	Certified units/sales
Canada (Music Canada)	Gold	50,000^{^}
France (SNEP)	Gold	100,000^{*}
Japan (ORICON)	—	139,000
Russia (NFPF)	Gold	10,000^{*}
United Kingdom (BPI)	Gold	100,000^{^}
United States (RIAA)	Gold	547,000
Summaries
Worldwide (IFPI)	—	1,300,000
^{*} Sales figures based on certification alone.^{^} Shipments figures based on certification alone.
