= New (Paul McCartney song) =

2013 single by Paul McCartney

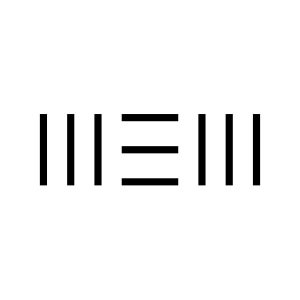

Single by Paul McCartney

from the album New
- Released: 2 September 2013
- Recorded: January 2012 – March 2013
- Studio: Hogg Hill Mill, Icklesham, UK; Avatar, New York City; AIR, London
- Genre: Pop
- Length: 2:57
- Label: Universal (UK); Hear Music (US)
- Songwriter: Paul McCartney
- Producer: Mark Ronson

Paul McCartney singles chronology
"Out Of Sight" (2013)	"New" (2013)	"Queenie Eye" (2013)

Music video
- "New" (Lyric Video) on YouTube

"New" is a song written by Paul McCartney. It was originally recorded by McCartney and produced by English musician Mark Ronson for McCartney's sixteenth studio album New, and appears as the sixth track on the album. After being released early on the iTunes Store as a track available to download from New on 28 August 2013, the song was released as a single on 2 September 2013 and available exclusively on Amazon.com. The single's premiere on 28 August was concurrent with the official reveal of New on the same day. The single gained heavy airplay on Japanese radio stations, where it became a number 4 hit on the Japan Hot 100.

The single joined BBC Radio 2's playlist and the album of the same name was their Record of the Week.

The song appears in both the opening and the end credits of Sony Pictures Animation's 2013 animated film Cloudy with a Chance of Meatballs 2.

== Reception ==
"New" was greeted positively by critics and the musical press. As well as being selected as BBC Radio 2's Record of the Week and placed on their A-list, the track was greeted as the "Track of the Day" by Mojo which praised its "doe-eyed optimism, irresistible melody" and "orchestrated pop arrangements". Rolling Stone's Will Hermes, praised its "bouncy harpsichord-laden melody", giving it a four-star rating and drawing comparisons to the Beatles' "Got to Get You into My Life", a view shared by The Daily Telegraph which described it as a "jaunty, Beatles-esque stomp".

== Live performances ==
McCartney performed the song live on late night shows such as Jimmy Kimmel Live and Late Night with Jimmy Fallon as well as at the iHeartRadio Music Festival where he premiered it as well as several other songs off the new album.

== Personnel ==
- Paul McCartney – vocals, bass guitar, harpsichord, piano, mellotron, Wurlitzer electric piano, congas, maracas, bouzouki
- Rusty Anderson – backing vocals, guitar, bouzouki
- Brian Ray – backing vocals, guitar
- Abe Laboriel Jr. – backing vocals, drums
- Paul Wickens – backing vocals
- Steve Sidwell – trumpet
- Jamie Talbot – tenor saxophone
- Dave Bishop – baritone saxophone

== Track listing ==
Digital download
No.	Title	Length
1.	"New"	2:57

== Chart performance ==
Chart (2013)	Peak position
Belgium (Ultratip Bubbling Under Flanders)	12
Belgium (Ultratip Bubbling Under Wallonia)	12
Japan Hot 100 (Billboard)	4
Mexico Ingles Airplay (Billboard)	25
Poland (LP3)	32
UK Singles (OCC)	105
US Adult Alternative Airplay (Billboard)	21
US Adult Contemporary (Billboard)	18
US Hot Rock & Alternative Songs (Billboard)	46

== Release history ==
Region	Date	Format	Label
United Kingdom	2 September 2013	Digital download	Universal Music Group International
United States	3 September 2013	Digital download	Hear Music
