= Queenie Eye =

Single by Paul McCartney

from the album New
- Released: 24 October 2013
- Recorded: January 2012
- Studio: Hog Hill Mill, Icklesham
- Genre: Rock
- Length: 3:47
- Label: Universal Music Group (UK); Hear Music (US)
- Songwriters: Paul McCartney, Paul Epworth
- Producer: Paul Epworth

Paul McCartney singles chronology
"New" (2013)	"Queenie Eye" (2013)	"Hope for the Future" (2014)

Music video
- "Queenie Eye" on YouTube

"Queenie Eye" is a song by Paul McCartney, written by McCartney and producer Paul Epworth. It is the second single from McCartney's solo album New, released in 2013.

McCartney explained that the song name and chorus lyrics were from a children's game he would play when he was young called "Queenie, Queenie, who's got the ball?" (the "Queenie" was alternatively called "Queenie Eye" or "Queenio"), and used the version of the chant he remembered from the game in the song.

== Music video ==
The music video for the song was directed by Simon Aboud, husband of McCartney's daughter Mary. The video is notable for the array of famous people that appear in it including: actors Johnny Depp, Jeremy Irons, Chris Pine, Jude Law, Sean Penn, Alice Eve, actor-comedian James Corden, Meryl Streep, actress-comedienne Tracey Ullman, models Kate Moss, Lily Cole, Laura Bailey, singers George Ezra, Jack Savoretti, Gary Barlow, artist Peter Blake, designer Tom Ford, comedian Howard Long, prima ballerina Tamara Rojo, model Daphne Selfe, and many others who are shown dancing to the song.

Members of the public were also invited to participate in the video by way of a Twitter post on Paul McCartney's newsfeed. The Tweet asked people to send a photograph taken that day (Saturday) alongside their name and day's date. They were also asked to wear clothing that they would then wear at the video recording the following week (Wednesday) "somewhere in Central London". After a selection process by McCartney and his team, participants were advised by telephone on the Monday and Tuesday that they had been selected to appear in the music video. At that stage, they were advised of the location – ABBEY ROAD STUDIOS and then had to agree to a social media embargo until the video shoot was complete. They were also issued with the lyrics to the song which they were requested to learn ahead of the video shoot. Participants then spent the day at Abbey Road studios alongside the stars being filmed that day. Some were featured prominently in the video with others appearing in background shots.

== Live performances ==
McCartney performed "Queenie Eye" on the 56th Annual Grammy Awards telecast in 2014, with fellow former Beatle Ringo Starr on drums as well as during his Out There and One on One tours. The song was also included in the setlist of Freshen Up tour as the only song from "New".

== Personnel ==
Credits sourced from the original album liner notes

- Paul McCartney – vocals, guitar, bass guitar, lap steel guitar, piano, synthesizers, mellotron, tambourine
- Paul Epworth – drums

== Chart positions ==
Chart (2013)	Peak position
Belgium (Ultratip Bubbling Under Flanders)	55
Japan Hot 100 (Billboard)	42
Poland (LP3)	32
US Adult Alternative Airplay (Billboard)	27
