= Ecce Cor Meum =

Studio album by Paul McCartney
- Released: 25 September 2006
- Recorded: 13–17 March 2006
- Studio: Abbey Road, London
- Genre: Classical, carol, hymn
- Length: 56:50
- Language: English, Latin
- Label: EMI Classics
- Producer: John Fraser

Paul McCartney chronology
Never Stop Doing What You Love (2005)	Ecce Cor Meum (2006)	Memory Almost Full (2007)

Professional ratings
Review scores
Source	Rating
AllMusic	3.5/5 stars
Encyclopedia of Popular Music	3/5 stars
The Rolling Stone Album Guide	3/5 stars

Ecce Cor Meum (Latin for Behold My Heart) is the fourth classical album by Paul McCartney. The album was released on 25 September 2006 by EMI Classics. An oratorio in four movements, it is produced by John Fraser, written in Latin and English, and scored for orchestra and boys and adult choir. The oratorio was partly inspired by McCartney's wife Linda. It is also the only classical album by McCartney that was not released on vinyl.

== History ==
The title was inspired by the inscription McCartney noticed above a statue of Jesus in the Church of St. Ignatius Loyola, New York City. The reference in the church context is to the Sacred Heart of Jesus, although McCartney freely adapted the text for use in his composition. Upon Sir Paul's grant of arms, he adopted "ECCE COR MEUM" as his motto.

Ecce Cor Meum had been more than eight years in the making and its origins follow in the tradition of composers commissioned to write music for Magdalen College, Oxford. McCartney was invited by Anthony Smith (president of Magdalen College 1998–2005) to compose something to set the seal on a new concert hall for the college.

The composition was delayed by the death of Linda, McCartney's wife, and could not be used for the opening of the new auditorium (which was celebrated instead by a premiere of Tony Harrison's verse film, Prometheus). The project did not die: with encouragement from the then Oxford University Music Society president and perseverance by the college itself, the work was finished and eventually performed in the Sheldonian Theatre, Oxford, in November 2001. The interlude is an elegy to Linda.

Originally, it was presented in 2001 with the full Choir of Magdalen College, Oxford, conducted by Bill Ives, in the Sheldonian Theatre, Oxford. McCartney expressed in the programme his hope "that this piece will carry the name of Magdalen to all parts of the globe and help to make people aware of the noble institution that it is".

Produced by John Fraser, Ecce Cor Meum was recorded at Abbey Road Studios between 13 and 17 March 2006. It was performed by soprano Kate Royal, the boys of Magdalen College Choir, Oxford, the boys of the Choir of King's College, Cambridge, London Voices and the Academy of St Martin in the Fields, conducted by Gavin Greenaway.

Its American première was 14 November 2006 at a sold-out Carnegie Hall in New York City. Scored for choir and orchestra, the Orchestra of St. Luke's under Greenaway joined the Concert Chorale of New York and the American Boychoir, with soprano Kate Royal and Andrew Staples as soloists. The concert was simulcast over WNYC-FM, New York Public Radio and webcast over wnyc.org.

The Canadian première took place on 27 October 2007 at Metropolitan United Church in London, Ontario. Conducted by Toronto conductor Robert Cooper, it was performed by the combined forces of the Orpheus Choir of Toronto, Chorus Niagara, London Pro Musica, the Amabile Treble Choir and Orchestra London.

On 3 May 2007, Paul McCartney was presented with the Best Album Award at the Classical Brits for Ecce Cor Meum, at the Royal Albert Hall. The award was voted for by readers of Classic FM magazine and listeners of Classic FM. The album reached number 2 in the Top Classical Albums charts from the US.

== Track listing ==
All pieces by Paul McCartney.

1. "I. Spiritus" – 12:00
2. "II. Gratia" – 10:50
3. "Interlude (Lament)" – 3:56
4. "III. Musica" – 15:14
5. "IV. Ecce Cor Meum" – 14:50

== Release details ==
Country	Date	Label	Format	Catalog
United Kingdom	25 September 2006	EMI Classics	CD (limited edition)	3704232 / 0946 3 70423 2 8
United Kingdom	25 September 2006	EMI Classics	CD	3704242 / 0946 3 70424 2 7
United States	26 September 2006	Angel Records, EMI Classics	CD	0946 3 70424 2 7
United States	17 October 2006	Angel Records, EMI Classics	CD (limited edition)	0946 3 70423 2 8
Japan	29 September 2006	Toshiba-EMI	CD	TOCP70099
