= I'll Follow the Sun =

1964 song by The Beatles

- Norwegian single picture sleeve

Song by the Beatles

from the album Beatles for Sale
- Released: 4 December 1964
- Recorded: 18 October 1964
- Studio: EMI, London
- Genre: Folk rock
- Length: 1:49
- Label: Parlophone
- Songwriter: Lennon–McCartney
- Producer: George Martin

Audio sample
- file; help

"I'll Follow the Sun" is a song by the English rock band the Beatles. It is a ballad written and sung by Paul McCartney and credited to Lennon–McCartney. It was released in 1964 on the Beatles for Sale album in the United Kingdom and on Beatles '65 in the United States. The band played the song on the BBC radio programme Top Gear, and the track was released on On Air – Live at the BBC Volume 2 in 2013.

The song was released as a mono extended play 45 in 1964 on Parlophone/EMI (and in 1995 as a B-side to "Baby It's You"). In Sweden, it reached number one on the Tio i Topp chart in July and also peaked at number four on Sweden's Kvällstoppen Chart.

== Composition ==
When asked about the lyrics, McCartney commented: "I wrote that in my front parlour in Forthlin Road. I was about 16. 'I'll Follow the Sun' was one of those very early ones. I seem to remember writing it just after I'd had the flu and I had that cigarette. I remember standing in the parlour, with my guitar, looking out through the lace curtains of the window, and writing that one."

== Recording ==
McCartney explained, "The next [single] had to always be different. We didn't want to fall into the Supremes trap where they all sounded similar, so we were always keen on having varied instrumentation. Ringo couldn't keep changing his drum kit, but he could change his snare, tap a cardboard box or slap his knees."

== Personnel ==
According to Walter Everett, except where noted.

- Paul McCartney – lead and harmony vocals, acoustic guitar
- John Lennon – harmony vocal
- George Harrison – electric rhythm guitar, guitar solo
- Ringo Starr – percussion (tapping hands on knees) (Note: In the recollection of Geoff Emerick (the session's tape op), a microphone was placed between Starr's legs as he tapped on them, with the EQ boosted in the control room to give the sound a greater depth.)

Note

- Everett mentions three guitars on the recording: (1) McCartney's acoustic, (2) Harrison's electric Gretsch Country Gentleman and (3) a Gretsch Tennessean, though he does not specify who played the latter. Author John C. Winn mentions an electric rhythm guitar, Harrison's guitar solo and McCartney's acoustic guitar. Authors Jean-Michel Guesdon and Philippe Margotin state the song includes only Harrison's electric rhythm guitar and one acoustic guitar played by either McCartney or Lennon.

== Cover versions ==
- In 1966, Chet Atkins released an instrumental cover on his album Chet Atkins Picks on the Beatles.
- The song was covered by David Ball in 1995 for the Beatles tribute album Come Together: America Salutes the Beatles.
- McCartney performed the song live during The 'US' Tour; likewise at the Paris Olympia on 22 October 2007, in Kyiv for the Independence Concert on 14 June 2008, in Quebec City at the free outdoor concert on 20 July 2008 (for the city's 400th anniversary celebration), at Tel Aviv, Israel, on 25 September 2008, and in New York City on 12 May 2015 (charity concert for the Robin Hood Benefit).
- Glen Phillips (lead singer of Toad the Wet Sprocket) covered the song for the soundtrack of the 2009 Eddie Murphy film Imagine That.
- The song was covered by Jazz vocalist Hailey Brinnel and released as a single in 2022.
