= Daphne Selfe =

British model (1928–2026)

Nude photograph by Walter Bird in 1951

Daphne Frances Selfe (1 July 1928 – 21 March 2026) was a British model from Edmonton, London, who worked for over 70 years and became the world's oldest model, still working at the age of 96.

Recognised by Guinness World Records as the world's oldest professional model, Selfe had a career spanning over 70 years. She worked with prestigious brands such as Dolce & Gabbana and graced the covers of Vogue and Marie Claire magazines.

Selfe also worked with some of the most renowned fashion photographers, including Mario Testino, Nick Knight and David Bailey, and was represented by the Models 1 agency.

Selfe also appeared in music videos, including Will Young's "Light My Fire" in 2002 and Paul McCartney's "Queenie Eye" in 2013.

In recognition of her contributions to fashion, she received the British Empire Medal in 2019.

Asked about her regimen of diet and skin care, she told reporters: "Nivea, broccoli and the odd glass of champagne".

Her last day of work was in June 2025, at a Vogue luncheon on Royal Ascot Ladies Day. She died on 21 March 2026, at the age of 97.
