= No More Lonely Nights =

1984 single by Paul McCartney

Single by Paul McCartney

from the album Give My Regards to Broad Street
- B-side: "No More Lonely Nights"; (Playout version, original pressing); "No More Lonely Nights"; (Special Dance Mix, later pressing)
- Released: 24 September 1984
- Recorded: 1984
- Studio: Abbey Road (London)
- Genre: Soft rock
- Length: 4:42 (ballad version); 4:35 (playout version)
- Label: Parlophone R6080 (stereo); Columbia (US & Canada)
- Songwriter: Paul McCartney
- Producer: George Martin

Paul McCartney singles chronology
"Pipes of Peace" (1983)	"No More Lonely Nights" (1984)	"We All Stand Together" (1984)

Music video
- "No More Lonely Nights" on YouTube

"No More Lonely Nights" is a song written and performed by the English musician Paul McCartney, first released on 24 September 1984, it was included on McCartney's fifth solo studio album Give My Regards to Broad Street.

The song features David Gilmour from Pink Floyd on guitars including the soaring solos and fills throughout the song. Reflecting upon the recording in a radio interview prior to 1990's Knebworth concerts, Gilmour told Jim Ladd that "No More Lonely Nights" was the last thing McCartney recorded for the film Give My Regards to Broad Street (late 1983/early 1984), and that he told McCartney to give his session fee to a charity of his choice.

== Release ==
Two versions of the single on both 7" and 12", and a 12" picture disc, were issued in both the UK and US. The first 7" version featured "No More Lonely Nights" backed with the playout version. The second featured the Arthur Baker Dance Mix as the B-side.

The power ballad reached number 6 in the US and number 2 in the UK. It was included on McCartney's double album compilation, All the Best! (1987), Wingspan: Hits and History (2001) and Pure McCartney (2016).

== Critical reception ==
Cash Box called the song a "heartwarming ballad" that is "tender and atmospheric." Billboard said "No surprises, but eminently satisfying."

Stephen Thomas Erlewine of AllMusic said the song was "an absolutely lovely mid-tempo tune graced by a terrific David Gilmour guitar solo."

== Track listings ==
7" single – UK, 1984

1. "No More Lonely Nights"
2. "No More Lonely Nights" (playout version)

7" single

1. "No More Lonely Nights"
2. "No More Lonely Nights" (special dance mix)

12" single – UK, 1984

1. "No More Lonely Nights" (extended playout version) – 6:55
2. "Silly Love Songs" (remake) – 4:29
3. "No More Lonely Nights" (ballad) – 4:38

12" single

1. "No More Lonely Nights" (special dance mix by Arthur Baker)
2. "No More Lonely Nights" (special dance edit)

== Charts ==
=== Weekly charts ===
Chart (1984)	Peak position
Australia (Kent Music Report)	9
Austria (Ö3 Austria Top 40)	15
Belgium (Ultratop 50 Flanders)	28
Belgium (VRT Top 30 Flanders)	17
Canada Top Singles (RPM)	10
Canada (CHUM)	13
Ireland (IRMA)	2
Japan (Oricon)	84
Luxembourg (Radio Luxembourg)	2
Netherlands (Dutch Top 40)	37
Netherlands (Single Top 100)	33
New Zealand (Recorded Music NZ)	19
Nicaragua (UPI)	4
South Africa (Springbok Radio)	29
Sweden (Sverigetopplistan)	7
UK Singles (Official Charts)	2
US Billboard Hot 100	6
US Adult Contemporary (Billboard)	2
US Cash Box Top 100	10
West Germany (GfK)	30

Chart (1985)	Peak position
Canada Adult Contemporary (RPM)	3

=== Year-end charts ===
Chart (1984)	Rank
Australia (Kent Music Report)	84
Canada Top Singles (RPM)	98
UK Singles (Official Single Charts)	22
US Cash Box Top 100	74

Chart (1985)	Rank
US Top Pop Singles (Billboard)	72
US Adult Contemporary (Billboard)	32

== Certifications ==
Region	Certification	Certified units/sales
United Kingdom (BPI)	Silver	250,000^{^}
^{^} Shipments figures based on certification alone.

== Official versions ==
No More Lonely Nights (Ballad) [produced by George Martin]

- 5:13 – CD Album Version (includes dialogue from the movie)
- 4:42 – LP/Vinyl Album Version (includes dialogue from the movie)
- 4:47 – Wingspan: Hits and History version (7" version with longer fadeout)
- 4:36 – 7" Version (clean introduction)
- 0:13 – Ballad Reprise

No More Lonely Nights (Playout Version) [produced by Arthur Baker]

- 5:03 – CD Album Version
- 4:26 – LP/Vinyl Album Version
- 3:58 – 7" Version
- No More Lonely Nights (Extended Version) – 8:10
- No More Lonely Nights (Special Dance Edit) – 4:22
- No More Lonely Nights (Special Dance Mix) (aka Extended Playout Version) – 6:55

== Personnel ==
- Paul McCartney – lead vocal, piano
- Linda McCartney – backing vocal, synthesizer
- Eric Stewart – backing vocal
- David Gilmour – guitar
- Herbie Flowers – bass
- Anne Dudley – synthesizer
- Stuart Elliott – drums
- George Martin – French horn and string arrangements
