= English Tea (song) =

Song by Paul McCartney

from the album Chaos and Creation in the Backyard
- Released: 12 September 2005
- Studio: Ocean Way Recording, Los Angeles (all but strings); AIR Studios, London (strings)
- Length: 2:12
- Label: Parlophone (UK); Capitol (US); Capitol Records/Universal Music Enterprises (2018 reissue)
- Songwriter: McCartney
- Producer: Nigel Godrich

"English Tea" is a song by the English musician Paul McCartney, released as the sixth track on his fourteenth studio album Chaos and Creation in the Backyard (2005). It is a song about tea.

== Background and composition ==
Paul McCartney wrote "English Tea" as a reflection on the English expressions he used to remember, including expressions he thought people didn't hear about. McCartney told the Observer that he liked the way people would talk in England, such as "Do you wanna cup of tea la[d]?, he was also impressed as to how he was able to work the word "peradventure" into the. The idea for the song came about while McCartney was on holiday when he recalled that Americans would often respond differently to someone saying they would want a cup of tea, where he "went to town" on that way of speaking.

"English Tea" celebrates the British English language and is in the key of G minor. It begins with a string quartet before McCartney comes in with a vocal that musicologist Vincent Perez Benitez Jr. thought sounded like something a Beatles vocal would sound like. Although John Blaney thought it would be something musician and comedian Neil Innes would write when humouring the British.

== Release and reception ==
In a review of Chaos and Creation in the Backyard for Slant Magazine, Preston Jones called it a "double-take-inducing direct bite of "For No One,"" Jim Beviglia of American Songwriter notes that listeners might be confused by the reference McCartney makes to British expressions in the lyrics, but that they will be able to understand McCartney to be celebrating the British, he explained the music with the woodwinds, would prove the "quaint and lovely" feeling of the song. Beviglia also included it in an unnumbered list of 5 of McCartney's "granny" songs, writing that the track is, in an Elizabethan way, "very much a statement of purpose from McCartney," believing that the song has the sound of an "idea of somewhat eccentric British-ness[ which] he proudly espouses here."

"English Tea" is included on the deluxe edition of the 2016 double disc Paul McCartney compilation Pure McCartney.

== Credits and personnel ==
According to the Chaos and Creation on the Backyard booklet:

Performers

- Paul McCartney – Bösendorfer grand piano, Höfner bass guitar, Ludwig bass drum, recorders, tubular bells, vocals
- Millennia Ensemble – strings and brass arrangements
- Joby Talbot – arranged and conducted by

Production

- Ocean Way Recording, L.A. – recorded at
- AIR Studios, London – strings recorded at
