= Jenny Wren =

2005 single by Paul McCartney

Single by Paul McCartney

from the album Chaos and Creation in the Backyard
- B-side: "Summer of '59" (7") "I Want You to Fly" (CD) "This Loving Game" (Maxi-CD)
- Released: 21 November 2005
- Recorded: October 2004
- Studio: Ocean Way, Los Angeles
- Genre: Folk; baroque pop
- Length: 3:47 (album version); 2:09 (radio edit)
- Label: Parlophone
- Songwriter: Paul McCartney
- Producer: Nigel Godrich

Paul McCartney singles chronology
"Fine Line" (2005)	"Jenny Wren" (2005)	"Really Love You" (2005)

"Jenny Wren" is a song by Paul McCartney from his 2005 album Chaos and Creation in the Backyard. It was also released, in the United Kingdom on 21 November 2005, as the second single from the album.

== Background ==
"Jenny Wren" was written in Los Angeles. McCartney wrote the tune in the same sort of finger picking style found in "Blackbird", "Mother Nature's Son" (The Beatles) and "Calico Skies" (Flaming Pie). The song earned a nomination for the 2006 Grammy Award for Best Male Pop Vocal Performance category.

As to who Jenny Wren is, McCartney said:

A wren is one of my favourite birds, little English bird, it’s the smallest English bird and I always feel very privileged to see a wren because they’re very shy and it’s just, Ah! So a combination of all of that. It’s a favourite bird for me, and then instead of making it a bird, again like ‘Blackbird,’ only more definitely this time I made it a woman, you know, a girl.

== Recording ==
The song was recorded in October 2004. The solo is played on an Armenian woodwind instrument, called a duduk, played by Venezuelan-born world winds specialist and multi-instrumentalist Pedro Eustache. The guitar is tuned down a whole step for the song.

== Covers ==
The song has been covered by several artists.

== Track listing ==
- Digital single released 31 October 2005
1. "Jenny Wren" (radio edit) – 2:09
- 7" R6678
1. "Jenny Wren" – 3:47
2. "Summer of '59" – 2:11
- CD CDR6678
1. "Jenny Wren" – 3:47
2. "I Want You to Fly" – 5:03
- Maxi-CD CDRS6678
1. "Jenny Wren" – 3:47
2. "I Want You to Fly" – 5:03
3. "This Loving Game" – 3:15
- PaulMcCartney.com exclusive digital download
1. "Jenny Wren" (Live from Abbey Road)

== Chart positions ==
Chart (2005)	Peak position
Denmark (Tracklisten)	17
Netherlands (Single Top 100)	58
Sweden (Sverigetopplistan)	40
UK Singles (Official Charts)	22
UK Physical Singles Chart	18

== Personnel ==
Personnel per booklet.

- Paul McCartney – vocals, Epiphone Texan acoustic guitar, Ludwig floor tom
- Pedro Eustache – duduk
