= Fine Line (Paul McCartney song) =

2005 single by Paul McCartney

Single by Paul McCartney

from the album Chaos and Creation in the Backyard
- B-side: "Growing Up Falling Down" (7") "Comfort of Love" (CD)
- Released: 29 August 2005
- Recorded: September 2004
- Studio: AIR, London
- Genre: Rock
- Length: 3:05
- Label: Parlophone
- Songwriter: Paul McCartney
- Producer: Nigel Godrich

Paul McCartney singles chronology
"Sgt. Pepper's Lonely Hearts Club Band" (2005)	"Fine Line" (2005)	"Jenny Wren" (2005)

"Fine Line" is a song from Paul McCartney's 2005 album, Chaos and Creation in the Backyard. McCartney plays a majority of the instruments on the song including drums, bass, and piano. It was released 29 August 2005 as the first single from the album in the UK (see 2005 in British music). It reached number 20 on the UK Singles Chart, McCartney's last top 20 solo single in the UK as of 2019, and number 31 on the US Adult Contemporary chart. The cover art is a drawing by British artist and frequent McCartney collaborator Brian Clarke.

A live version is also featured on The Space Within US concert DVD from 2006.

== Reception ==
In a 2013 issue of Rolling Stone magazine, the editors called the piano-guitar duel "rollicking".

== Track listings ==
7" R6673

1. "Fine Line" – 3:05
2. "Growing Up Falling Down" – 3:27

CD CDR6673

1. "Fine Line" – 3:05
2. "Comfort of Love" – 3:08

CD

1. "Fine Line" – 3:06
2. "Comfort of Love" – 3:09
3. "Growing Up Falling Down" – 3:27

== Charts ==
Chart (2005)	Peak position
Denmark (Tracklisten)	17
Germany (GfK)	70
Italy (FIMI)	23
Japan (Oricon)	112
Netherlands (Single Top 100)	28
Spain (Promusicae)	20
Sweden (Sverigetopplistan)	46
UK Singles (Official Charts)	20
UK Top 40 (Official Charts Company)	17
UK Physical Singles Chart	17
US Adult Contemporary (Billboard)	31

== Personnel ==
Personnel per booklet.

- Paul McCartney – vocals, Bösendorfer grand piano, Baldwin spinet, Höfner bass guitar, Epiphone Casino electric guitar, Martin D28 acoustic guitar, Ludwig drums, shakers, tambourine
- Millennia Ensemble – strings
- Joby Talbot – conducting, arrangement
