= Good Evening Europe Tour =

2009 concert tour by Paul McCartney

- Conitnental tour by Paul McCartney
- Online ticket advertisement for the last date
- Location: Europe
- Associated album: Good Evening New York City
- Start date: 2 December 2009
- End date: 22 December 2009
- No. of shows: 8

Paul McCartney concert chronology
- Summer Live '09 (2009); Good Evening Europe Tour (2009); Up and Coming Tour (2010–11)

The Good Evening Europe Tour was a concert tour by Paul McCartney in Europe. A continuation of his Summer Live '09 show, the tour began on 2 December 2009, at the Color Line Arena in Hamburg, Germany, and concluded on 22 December 2009, at The O_{2} Arena in London, England.

== Background ==
The tour followed McCartney's summer tour of the United States, Summer Live '09, and the live album pulled from his three-night stint at the newly opened Citi Field in New York City, Good Evening New York City.

== Personnel ==
- Paul McCartney: Lead Vocals, Bass, Piano, Acoustic Guitar, Electric Guitar, Ukulele, Mandolin
- Rusty Anderson: Backing Vocals, Electric Guitar, Acoustic Guitar
- Brian Ray: Backing Vocals, Electric Guitar, Acoustic Guitar, Bass
- Paul "Wix" Wickens: Backing Vocals, Keyboards, Electric Guitar, Percussion, Harmonica
- Abe Laboriel Jr.: Backing Vocals, Drums, Percussion

== Tour dates ==
List of 2009 concerts
Date	City	Country	Venue	Attendance	Revenue
2 December	Hamburg	Germany	O_{2} World Hamburg	—N/a	—N/a
3 December	Berlin	Germany	O_{2} World	—N/a	—N/a
9 December	Arnhem	Netherlands	GelreDome	26,579 / 31,932	$2,822,160
10 December	Paris	France	Palais Omnisports de Paris-Bercy	15,992 / 15,992	$2,122,090
16 December	Cologne	Germany	Lanxess Arena	—N/a	—N/a
17 December	Cologne	Germany	Lanxess Arena	—N/a	—N/a
20 December	Dublin	Ireland	The O_{2}	—N/a	—N/a
22 December	London	England	The O_{2} Arena	17,700 / 17,700	$2,739,260

== Set list ==
O2 World Hamburg
1. "Magical Mystery Tour"
2. "Drive My Car"
3. "Jet"
4. "Only Mama Knows"
5. "Flaming Pie"
6. "Got to Get You into My Life"
7. "Let Me Roll It" (with "Foxy Lady" coda)
8. "Highway"
9. "The Long and Winding Road"
10. "My Love"
11. "Blackbird"
12. "Here Today"
13. "Dance Tonight"
14. "And I Love Her"
15. "Mrs Vandebilt"
16. "Eleanor Rigby"
17. "Sing the Changes"
18. "Band on the Run"
19. "Back in the U.S.S.R."
20. "Ob-La-Di, Ob-La-Da"
21. "Something"
22. "I've Got a Feeling"
23. "Paperback Writer"
24. "A Day in the Life/Give Peace a Chance"
25. "Let It Be"
26. "Live and Let Die"
27. "Hey Jude"
  - Encore 1
28. "Day Tripper"
29. "Lady Madonna"
30. "Get Back"
  - Encore 2
31. "Yesterday"
32. "Helter Skelter"
33. "Sgt. Pepper's/The End"
O2 World Berlin, GelreDome
1. "Magical Mystery Tour"
2. "Drive My Car"
3. "Jet"
4. "Only Mama Knows"
5. "Flaming Pie"
6. "Got to Get You into My Life"
7. "Let Me Roll It" (with "Foxy Lady" coda)
8. "Highway"
9. "The Long and Winding Road"
10. "(I Want to) Come Home"
11. "My Love"
12. "Blackbird"
13. "Here Today"
14. "Dance Tonight"
15. "And I Love Her"
16. "Mrs Vandebilt"
17. "Eleanor Rigby"
18. "Band on the Run"
19. "Ob-La-Di, Ob-La-Da"
20. "Sing the Changes"
21. "Back in the U.S.S.R."
22. "Something"
23. "I've Got a Feeling"
24. "Paperback Writer"
25. "A Day in the Life/Give Peace a Chance"
26. "Let It Be"
27. "Live and Let Die"
28. "Hey Jude"
  - Encore 1
29. "Day Tripper"
30. "Lady Madonna"
31. "Get Back"
  - Encore 2
32. "Yesterday"
33. "Helter Skelter"
34. "Sgt. Pepper's/The End"
Palais Omnisports de Paris-Bercy
1. "Magical Mystery Tour"
2. "Drive My Car"
3. "Jet"
4. "Only Mama Knows"
5. "Flaming Pie"
6. "Got to Get You into My Life"
7. "Let Me Roll It" (with "Foxy Lady" coda)
8. "Highway"
9. "The Long and Winding Road"
10. "(I Want to) Come Home"
11. "My Love"
12. "Blackbird"
13. "Here Today"
14. "Dance Tonight"
15. "And I Love Her"
16. "Mrs Vandebilt"
17. "Michelle"
18. "Eleanor Rigby"
19. "Band on the Run"
20. "Ob-La-Di, Ob-La-Da"
21. "Sing the Changes"
22. "Back in the U.S.S.R."
23. "Something"
24. "I've Got a Feeling"
25. "Paperback Writer"
26. "A Day in the Life/Give Peace a Chance"
27. "Let It Be"
28. "Live and Let Die"
29. "Hey Jude"
  - Encore 1
30. "Day Tripper"
31. "Lady Madonna"
32. "Get Back"
  - Encore 2
33. "Yesterday"
34. "Helter Skelter"
35. "Sgt. Pepper's/The End"
Lanxess Arena I
1. "Magical Mystery Tour"
2. "Drive My Car"
3. "Jet"
4. "Only Mama Knows"
5. "Flaming Pie"
6. "Got to Get You into My Life"
7. "Let Me Roll It" (with "Foxy Lady" coda)
8. "Highway"
9. "The Long and Winding Road"
10. "(I Want to) Come Home"
11. "My Love"
12. "Blackbird"
13. "Here Today"
14. "Dance Tonight"
15. "And I Love Her"
16. "Eleanor Rigby"
17. "Something"
18. "Mrs Vandebilt"
19. "Sing the Changes"
20. "Band on the Run"
21. "Ob-La-Di, Ob-La-Da"
22. "Back in the U.S.S.R."
23. "I've Got a Feeling"
24. "Paperback Writer"
25. "A Day in the Life/Give Peace a Chance"
26. "Let It Be"
27. "Live and Let Die"
28. "Hey Jude"
  - Encore 1
29. "Wonderful Christmastime"
30. "Day Tripper"
31. "Lady Madonna"
32. "Get Back"
  - Encore 2
33. "Yesterday"
34. "Helter Skelter"
35. "Sgt. Pepper's/The End"
Lanxess Arena II
1. "Magical Mystery Tour"
2. "Drive My Car"
3. "Jet"
4. "Only Mama Knows"
5. "Flaming Pie"
6. "Got to Get You into My Life"
7. "Let Me Roll It" (with "Foxy Lady" coda)
8. "Highway"
9. "The Long and Winding Road"
10. "(I Want to) Come Home"
11. "My Love"
12. "Blackbird"
13. "Here Today"
14. "Dance Tonight"
15. "And I Love Her"
16. "Eleanor Rigby"
17. "Something"
18. "Mrs Vandebilt"
19. "Sing the Changes"
20. "Band on the Run"
21. "Ob-La-Di, Ob-La-Da"
22. "Back in the U.S.S.R."
23. "I've Got a Feeling"
24. "Paperback Writer"
25. "A Day in the Life/Give Peace a Chance"
26. "Let It Be"
27. "Live and Let Die"
28. "Hey Jude"
  - Encore 1
29. "Day Tripper"
30. "Wonderful Christmastime"
31. "Lady Madonna"
32. "Get Back"
  - Encore 2
33. "Yesterday"
34. "Helter Skelter"
35. "Sgt. Pepper's/The End"
The O2, Dublin
1. "Magical Mystery Tour"
2. "Drive My Car"
3. "Jet"
4. "Only Mama Knows"
5. "Flaming Pie"
6. "Got to Get You into My Life"
7. "Let Me Roll It" (with "Foxy Lady" coda)
8. "Highway"
9. "The Long and Winding Road"
10. "(I Want to) Come Home"
11. "My Love"
12. "Blackbird"
13. "Here Today"
14. "Something"
15. "Dance Tonight"
16. "And I Love Her"
17. "Eleanor Rigby"
18. "Mrs Vandebilt"
19. "Sing the Changes"
20. "Wonderful Christmastime"
21. "Band on the Run"
22. "Ob-La-Di, Ob-La-Da"
23. "Back in the U.S.S.R."
24. "I've Got a Feeling"
25. "Paperback Writer"
26. "A Day in the Life/Give Peace a Chance"
27. "Let It Be"
28. "Live and Let Die"
29. "Hey Jude"
  - Encore 1
30. "Day Tripper"
31. "Lady Madonna"
32. "Get Back"
  - Encore 2
33. "Yesterday"
34. "Helter Skelter"
35. "Sgt. Pepper's/The End"
The O2 Arena, London
1. "Magical Mystery Tour"
2. "Drive My Car"
3. "Jet"
4. "Only Mama Knows"
5. "Flaming Pie"
6. "Got to Get You into My Life"
7. "Let Me Roll It" (with "Foxy Lady" coda)
8. "Highway"
9. "The Long and Winding Road"
10. "(I Want to) Come Home"
11. "My Love"
12. "Blackbird"
13. "Here Today"
14. "Dance Tonight"
15. "And I Love Her"
16. "Eleanor Rigby"
17. "Leaning on a Lampost"
18. "Something"
19. "Mrs Vandebilt"
20. "Sing the Changes"
21. "Wonderful Christmastime"
22. "Band on the Run"
23. "Ob-La-Di, Ob-La-Da"
24. "Back in the U.S.S.R."
25. "I've Got a Feeling"
26. "Paperback Writer"
27. "A Day in the Life/Give Peace a Chance"
28. "Let It Be"
29. "Live and Let Die"
30. "Hey Jude"
  - Encore 1
31. "Day Tripper"
32. "Lady Madonna"
33. "Get Back"
  - Encore 2
34. "Yesterday"
35. "Mull of Kintyre" (with Scottish Highland Bagpipe Band)
36. "Helter Skelter"
37. "Sgt. Pepper's/The End"

== Instruments played by band members ==
Songs	McCartney	Anderson	Ray	Wickens	Laboriel
Magical Mystery Tour	Bass	Electric Guitar	Electric Guitar	Keyboards	Drums
Drive My Car	Bass	Electric Guitar	Electric Guitar	Keyboards	Drums
Jet	Bass	Electric Guitar	Electric Guitar	Keyboards	Drums
Only Mama Knows	Bass	Electric Guitar	Electric Guitar	Keyboards	Drums
Flaming Pie	Bass	Electric Guitar	Electric Guitar	Keyboards	Drums
Got to Get You into My Life	Bass	Electric Guitar	Electric Guitar	Keyboards	Drums
Let Me Roll It	Electric Guitar	Electric Guitar	Bass	Keyboards	Drums
Highway	Bass	Electric Guitar	Electric Guitar	Harmonica/Keyboards	Drums
The Long and Winding Road	Piano	Electric Guitar	Bass	Keyboards	Drums
(I Want To) Come Home	Piano	Electric Guitar	Bass	Keyboards	Drums
My Love	Piano	Electric Guitar	Bass	Keyboards	Drums
Blackbird	Acoustic Guitar	None	None	None	None
Here Today	Acoustic Guitar	None	None	None	None
Dance Tonight	Mandolin	Electric Guitar	Bass	Keyboards	Drums
And I Love Her	Acoustic Guitar	Acoustic Guitar	Bass	Claves	Drums
Mrs. Vandebilt	Acoustic Guitar	Electric Guitar	Bass	Keyboards	Drums
Eleanor Rigby	Acoustic Guitar	None	None	Keyboards	None
Band on the Run	Bass	Electric Guitar	Electric Guitar/Acoustic Guitar	Keyboards	Drums
Ob-La-Di Ob-La-Da	Bass	Electric Guitar	Acoustic Guitar	Keyboards	Drums
Sing the Changes	Bass	Electric Guitar	Acoustic Guitar	Keyboards	Drums
Back in the USSR	Bass	Electric Guitar	Electric Guitar	Keyboards	Drums
Something	Ukulele/Acoustic Guitar	Electric Guitar	Bass	Keyboards	Drums
I've Got a Feeling	Electric Guitar	Electric Guitar	Bass	Keyboards	Drums
Paperback Writer	Electric Guitar	Electric Guitar	Bass	Keyboards	Drums
A Day in the Life/Give Peace a Chance	Bass	Acoustic Guitar	Acoustic Guitar	Keyboards	Drums
Let It Be	Piano	Electric Guitar	Bass	Keyboards	Drums
Live and Let Die	Piano	Electric Guitar	Bass	Keyboards	Drums
Hey Jude	Piano	Electric Guitar	Bass	Keyboards	Drums
Wonderful Christmastime	Bass	Electric Guitar	Electric Guitar	Keyboards	Drums
Day Tripper	Bass	Electric Guitar	Electric Guitar	Tambourine	Drums
Lady Madonna	Piano	Electric Guitar	Bass	Keyboards	Drums
Get Back	Bass	Electric Guitar	Electric Guitar	Keyboards	Drums
Yesterday	Acoustic Guitar	None	None	Keyboards	None
Helter Skelter	Bass	Electric Guitar	Electric Guitar	Electric Guitar	Drums
Sgt. Pepper's/The End	Electric Guitar	Electric Guitar	Bass/Electric Guitar	Keyboards	Drums

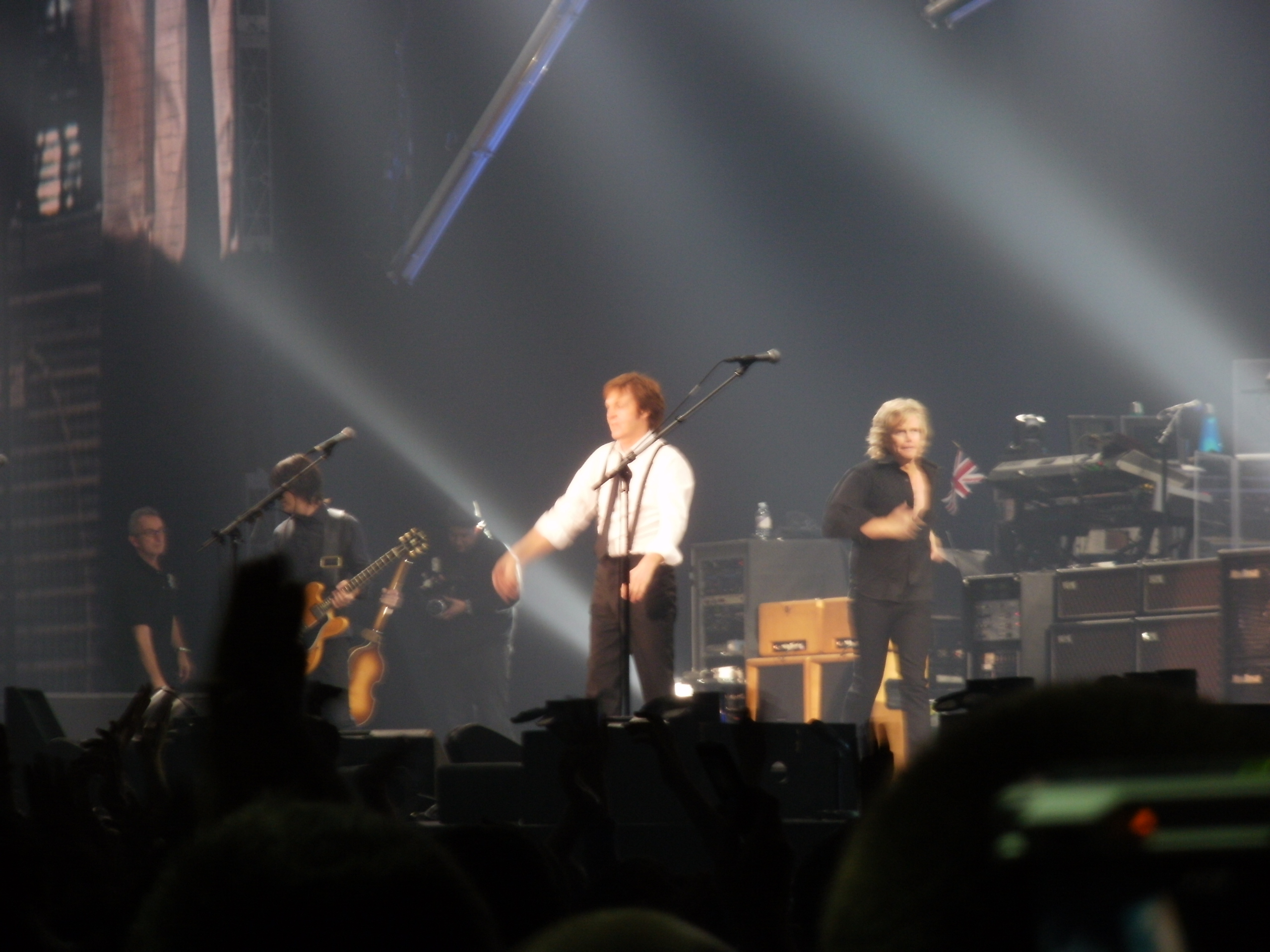
Paul takes to the stage in Dublin

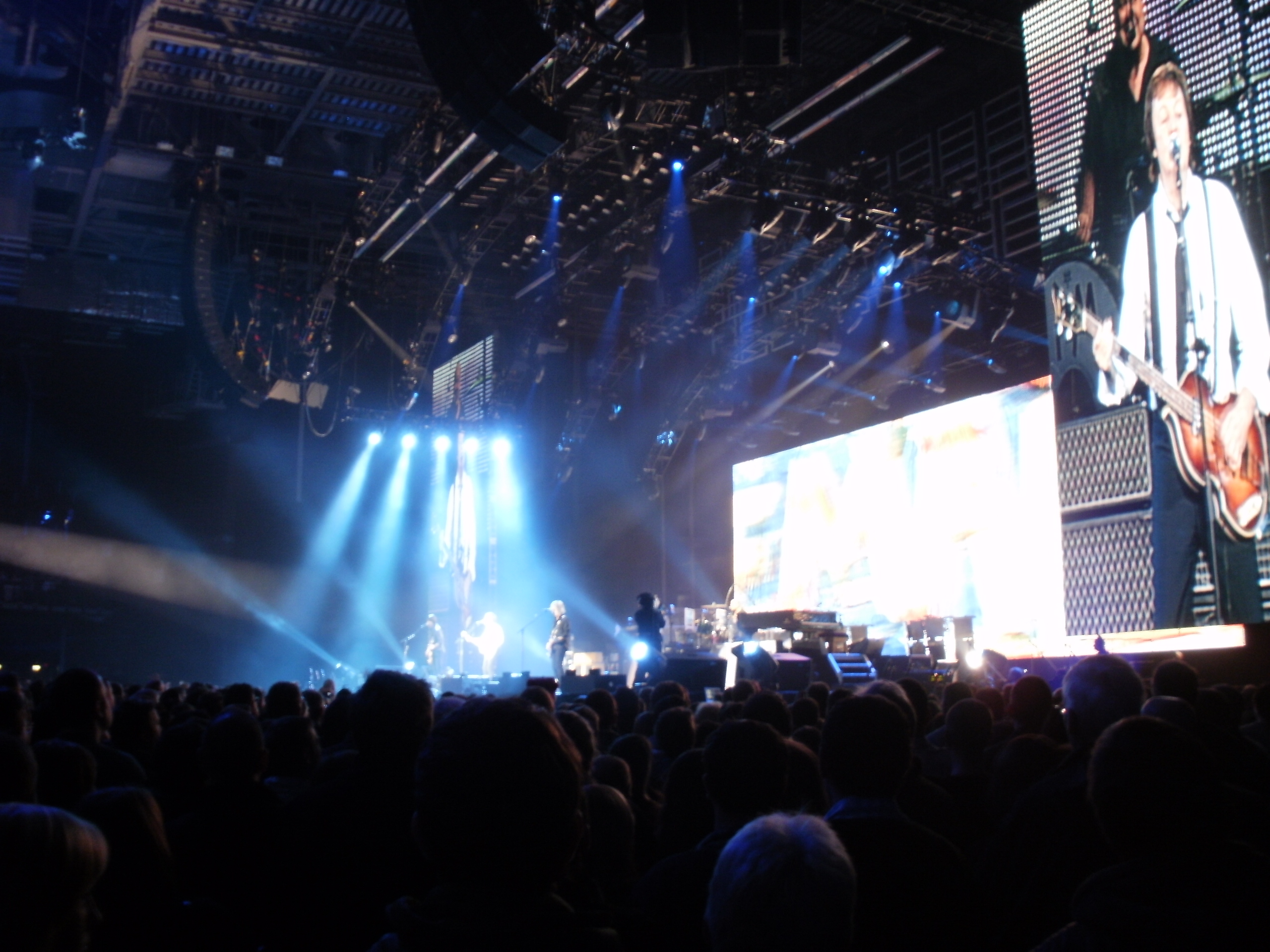
The stage from the Good Evening Europe tour

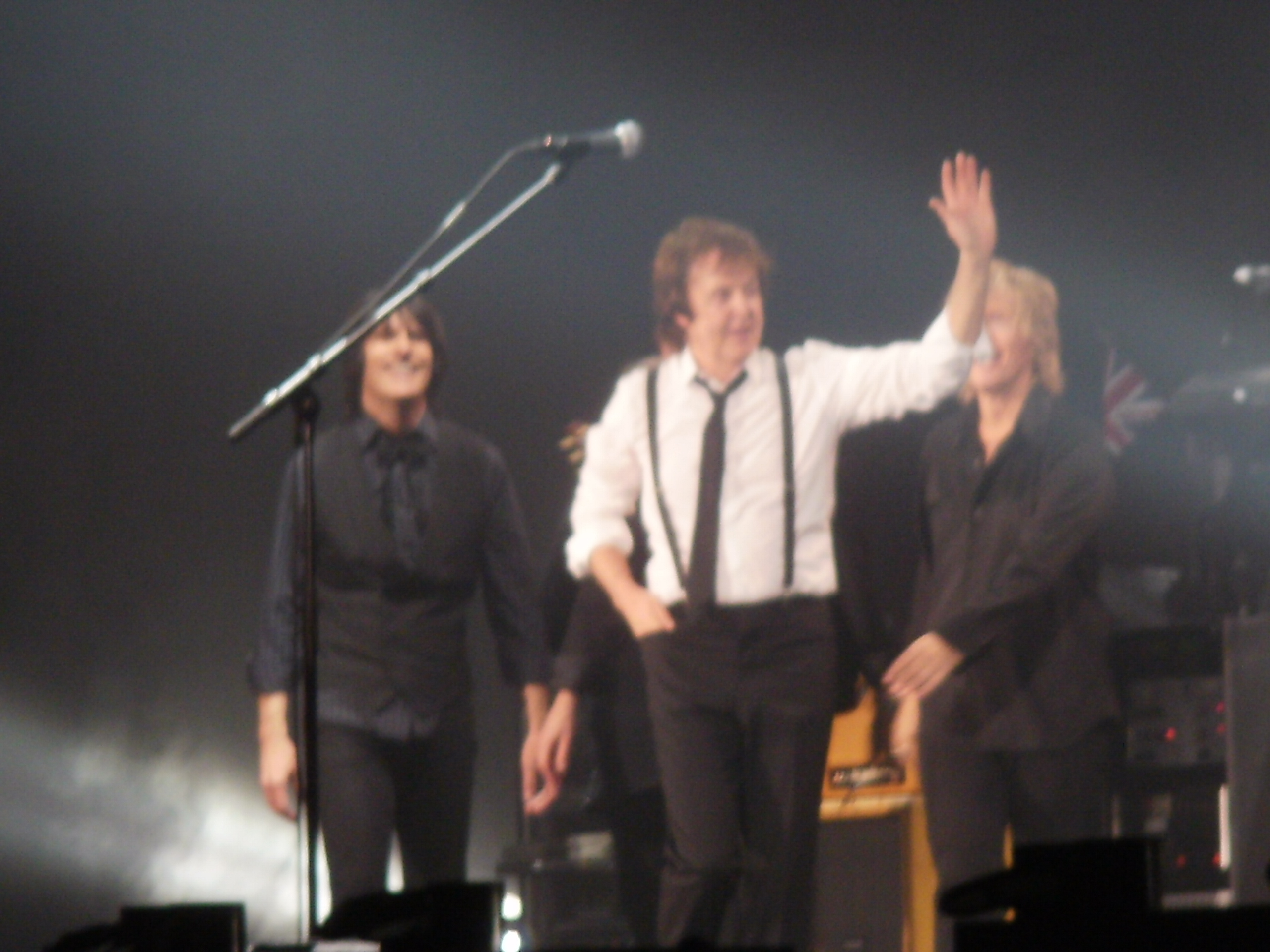
Paul leaving the stage after a concert in Dublin, December 2009
