= Summer Live '09 =

2009 concert tour by Paul McCartney

- Continental tour by Paul McCartney
- Original Citi Field concerts ticket advertisement (before addition of 21 July concert)
- Location: North America
- Start date: 17 July 2009
- End date: 19 August 2009
- No. of shows: 10
- Box office: US$$32 million ($48.02 in 2025 dollars)

Paul McCartney concert chronology
- Secret Tour (2007); Summer Live '09 (2009); Good Evening Europe Tour (2009)

Summer Live '09 was the ninth solo concert tour by English musician Paul McCartney. The tour began on 11 July 2009 at the Halifax Common in Halifax, Canada, and closed at Cowboys Stadium in Arlington, United States, on 19 August 2009. It visited 7 cities across North America, earning $36 million from ten shows.

== Background ==
McCartney performed three nights at the new Citi Field in New York City on 17, 18 and 21 July 2009, replicating his role as a Beatle opening the newly opened Shea Stadium in 1965. To promote the tour, McCartney appeared on Late Show with David Letterman on 15 July, and performed a seven-song mini-concert atop the marquee of the Ed Sullivan Theater (although only two songs, "Get Back" and "Sing the Changes" were aired). Good Evening New York City, a live CD/DVD of the Citi Field concerts was released on 17 November 2009; furthermore, the Deluxe Edition contains the complete 7 song mini-concert.

== Personnel ==
- Paul McCartney: Lead Vocals, Bass, Acoustic Guitar, Piano, Electric Guitar, Ukulele, Mandolin
- Rusty Anderson: Backing Vocals, Electric Guitar, Acoustic Guitar
- Brian Ray: Backing Vocals, Electric Guitar, Acoustic Guitar, Bass
- Paul "Wix" Wickens: Backing Vocals, Keyboards, Accordion, Electric Guitar, Percussion, Harmonica
- Abe Laboriel Jr.: Backing Vocals, Drums, Percussion

== Tour dates ==
List of 2009 concerts
Date	City	Country	Venue	Attendance	Revenue
11 July	Halifax	Canada	Halifax Common	26,504	CDN$3,500,000
17 July	New York City	United States	Citi Field	109,541 / 109,541	$12,775,662
18 July	New York City	United States	Citi Field	109,541 / 109,541	$12,775,662
21 July	New York City	United States	Citi Field	109,541 / 109,541	$12,775,662
1 August 2009	Washington, D.C.	United States	FedExField	—N/a	—N/a
5 August	Boston	United States	Fenway Park	68,626 / 70,607	$7,926,798
6 August	Boston	United States	Fenway Park	68,626 / 70,607	$7,926,798
15 August	Atlanta	United States	Piedmont Park	36,062 / 49,999	$3,517,564
17 August	Tulsa	United States	BOK Center	15,479 / 15,479	$2,648,659
19 August	Arlington	United States	Cowboys Stadium	35,903 / 35,903	$5,054,620
Total				265,611 / 281,529 (94%)	$31,923,303

== Set list ==
1. Drive My Car
2. Jet
3. Only Mama Knows
4. Flaming Pie
5. Got to Get You into My Life
6. Let Me Roll It (with Foxy Lady ending)
7. Highway
8. The Long and Winding Road
9. My Love
10. Blackbird
11. Here Today
12. Dance Tonight
13. Calico Skies
14. Michelle (played only in Washington, in honour of Michelle Obama)
15. It is So Easy (played only in Texas, as a tribute to Buddy Holly)
16. Mrs. Vandebilt
17. Eleanor Rigby
18. Sing the Changes
19. Band on the Run
20. Back in the U.S.S.R.
21. I'm Down
22. Something
23. I've Got a Feeling
24. Paperback Writer
25. A Day in the Life/Give Peace a Chance
26. Let It Be
27. Live and Let Die
28. Hey Jude
  1st Encore:
29. Mull of Kintyre (Halifax)
30. Day Tripper
31. Lady Madonna
32. I Saw Her Standing There (with Billy Joel on 17 July at Citi Field)
  2nd Encore:
33. Yesterday
34. Helter Skelter
35. Get Back
36. Sgt. Pepper's/The End medley
