= Gunnar Madsen =

American singer

Gunnar Madsen is an American composer and vocalist. He was the founder and leader of The Bobs before leaving the group in 1991, and has released several albums as a solo artist since then.

== Biography ==
Madsen learned to play guitar as a teenager and studied classical piano at UC Berkeley. He worked for a singing telegram corporation before founding the a cappella ensemble The Bobs in 1981. Among other successes, Madsen was nominated for a Grammy Award for their arrangement of "Helter Skelter" by The Beatles.

Madsen left The Bobs in 1991 and began writing video game music for the Atari Coin-Op games. He began releasing albums as a solo artist in 1997 and has released eight as of 2021. His efforts include three children's records (all recipients of Parents' Choice Gold Awards), three recordings of instrumental compositions. In 2021 he began releasing electronic music under the names MCMGM and markeprang.

The title song from his CD Old Mr. Mackle Hackle was adapted by Madsen into a children's book for Little, Brown & Co. He provided the singing voice for Don Cheadle's portrayal of Sammy Davis Jr. in the HBO film The Rat Pack, and arranged music for and appeared in the 2006 Vince Vaughn/Jennifer Aniston film The Break-Up. His music has also been featured in HBO's Sex and the City and the films Breaking the Rules and Just a Kiss. A musical, "The Shaggs: Philosophy of the World", based on the life story of The Shaggs (co-written with Joy Gregory) was co-produced Off-Broadway by the New York Theatre Workshop and Playwrights Horizons in 2011, and was nominated for a Lucille Lortel Award and two Drama Desk Awards.

== Discography ==
with The Bobs

- The Bobs (1983)
- My, I'm Large (1987)
- Songs for Tomorrow Morning (1988)
- Sing the Songs of... (1991)

Solo

- 6 Songs for Children (1991)
- Spinning World: 13 Ways of Looking at a Waltz (1997)
- The Power of a Hat (1998)
- Old Mr. Mackle Hackle (1999)
- Ants in My Pants (2001)
- The Fall of Troy (2006)
- I'm Growing (2008)
- Two Hands (2009)
- I Am Your Food (2018)
- On The Floor (as MCMGM) (2021)
- Transitions (as markeprang) (2021)
