= Elwood Decker =

American painter

Elwood Decker (1903–1992) was an American painter.

== Biography ==
Elwood Decker was born in Fresno, California on 8 April 1903. In 1931, after Decker had done a tour of duty with the U.S. Army, he had come to live as an artist in the dunes of Oceano. He had found a group of artists which he joined. The artists included writers, poets, and free-thinkers, who called themselves Dunites. In 1935, Decker decided to leave the dunes to become an artist for the Civilian Conservation Corps. With this new job, he was assigned to create his own representation or portrayal of the reconstruction of the buildings at historic Fort Churchill that was near Reno, Nevada. This included brick making, scaffolding, tools and equipment, and the men themselves. Over 40 of his works with this assignment were sent to Washington, and others of them were left in the state of Nevada. By the end of 1935, Decker ended up living back in the dunes as the mysterious artist once again. In June 1946, Elwood married Ann Carpenter, who he met in the dunes, and they moved to Hollywood, California. In 1965, Elwood and Ann moved from West Hollywood to Thousand Oaks, California.

== Education ==
Elwood Decker attended high school in Oakland, California and later the California School of Fine Arts in San Francisco. In 1952, Decker enrolled at Santa Monica City College to study photography.

== Interests ==
Perhaps Elwood's greatest interest, and indeed that of Ann, was his devotion to Sri Anandamayi Ma and many of his poems were published in Ananda Varta. Decker's interests extended to filmmaking, writing, and music. He spent much of his life in San Luis Obispo. He worked in paint, ink, and pottery, and his style ranged over many schools of modern art: abstract, expressionist and impressionist, among others. He was the subject of a biographical song by The Bobs.

== Death ==
In 1992, Elwood Decker was killed by a freight train while he was walking along the tracks that were in dunes of Oceano. His wife, Anne Decker, had died several years earlier. At Elwood and Ann's request, their ashes were scattered together in a remote section of the dunes where they had first met over forty years earlier.

== Preservation ==
The Academy Film Archive has preserved several of Elwood Decker's films, including Color Fragments, Micro 2, Crystals, and Light Modulators.
