= Good Evening New York City =

Live album by Paul McCartney
- Released: 17 November 2009
- Recorded: 17–21 July 2009
- Venue: Citi Field (New York City)
- Genre: Rock
- Length: CDs: 123:11; DVD: 153:27; Bonus DVD: 47:04
- Label: Mercury
- Producer: Geoff Emerick; Paul Hicks; Jonas Westling; Richard Lancaster; John Henry

Paul McCartney chronology
Electric Arguments (2008)	Good Evening New York City (2009)	Ocean's Kingdom (2011)

Professional ratings
Review scores
Source	Rating
AllMusic	3/5 stars
BBC	(favourable)
Beats Per Minute	64/100
Consequence of Sound	C−
Entertainment.ie	3.5/5 stars
Entertainment Weekly	B+
Hot Press	3/5
Pitchfork	5.9/10
Q	4/5 stars
Record Collector	4/5 stars
Rolling Stone	3.5/5 stars
Uncut	3/5 stars

Good Evening New York City is a CD/DVD double live album by Paul McCartney consisting of material performed over three nights as the inaugural concerts at New York City's Citi Field, 17, 18 and 21 July 2009, part of his Summer Live '09 concert tour. Over 180,000 tickets were sold within hours of the shows being announced. The album is McCartney's third release for Hear Music, following 2007 album Memory Almost Full and the live EP Amoeba's Secret. Previous McCartney live albums such as Back in the U.S. proved to be huge sellers based on his record-breaking live shows from the 2000s.

At the 53rd Grammy Awards, the recording of "Helter Skelter" from the album won in the category of Best Solo Rock Vocal Performance.

== Description ==
The concert footage featured on the standard edition of the set was directed by Paul Becher, who has overseen live visuals for McCartney for over 200 performances. The performances were shot using 15 cameras and digital footage incorporated from 75 flipcams handed out to fans over the course of the three-night stand. The audio mix, in both stereo and 5.1, was handled by longtime Beatles engineer Geoff Emerick, and also longtime McCartney engineer Paul Hicks, whose credits include the recent Beatles remasters, The Beatles Anthology and Let It Be... Naked, and two Grammy awards for his mixing work on the Beatles' Love album.

The documented concerts held special significance for McCartney and his fans. Citi Field sits adjacent to the site of the former Shea Stadium, where his former band, the Beatles, set record attendance figures in 1965. In 2008, McCartney joined Billy Joel onstage for the final rock show at Shea Stadium before its demolition. Joel returned the favour for the first of McCartney's July performances, the first concerts to be held at Citi Field. Of the 20 Beatles songs performed on the album, 17 of these were released after the original Beatles performance, with "I'm Down" the only common song.

The performances of "Sing the Changes", "Jet", and "Band on the Run" included in this set were released as a downloadable three-track pack for the Rock Band video game on 5 January 2010.

== Formats ==
The package is available in two formats: a 3-disc (2 CD + 1 DVD) standard edition and a 4-disc (2 CD + 2 DVD) deluxe version featuring expanded packaging and a bonus DVD including McCartney's 15 July performance on the Ed Sullivan Theater marquee for his appearance on the Late Show with David Letterman.

The deluxe edition is available from an album specific store set up through McCartney's website and through Best Buy stores.

== Track listing ==
=== Standard and Deluxe Edition CDs/DVD ===
All tracks are written by Lennon–McCartney, unless otherwise noted.

CD one
No.	Title	Writer(s)	Length
1.	"Drive My Car"		2:25
2.	"Jet"	Paul McCartney, Linda McCartney	4:20
3.	"Only Mama Knows"	Paul McCartney	3:41
4.	"Flaming Pie"	Paul McCartney	2:29
5.	"Got to Get You into My Life"		2:51
6.	"Let Me Roll It" (with "Foxy Lady" coda)	Paul McCartney, Linda McCartney / Jimi Hendrix	5:51
7.	"Highway"	Paul McCartney	3:55
8.	"The Long and Winding Road"		3:41
9.	"My Love"	Paul McCartney, Linda McCartney	3:53
10.	"Blackbird"		2:43
11.	"Here Today"	Paul McCartney	2:32
12.	"Dance Tonight"	Paul McCartney	3:02
13.	"Calico Skies"	Paul McCartney	2:39
14.	"Mrs. Vandebilt"	Paul McCartney, Linda McCartney	4:40
15.	"Eleanor Rigby"		2:25
16.	"Sing the Changes"	Paul McCartney	4:17
17.	"Band on the Run"	Paul McCartney, Linda McCartney	5:16
Total length:			60:34

CD two
No.	Title	Writer(s)	Length
1.	"Back in the U.S.S.R."		3:08
2.	"I'm Down"		2:23
3.	"Something" (Tribute to George Harrison, first part played on ukulele)	George Harrison	4:07
4.	"I've Got a Feeling"		5:51
5.	"Paperback Writer"		3:29
6.	"A Day in the Life / Give Peace a Chance"	John Lennon, Paul McCartney / John Lennon	5:44
7.	"Let It Be"		3:55
8.	"Live and Let Die"	Paul McCartney, Linda McCartney	3:14
9.	"Hey Jude"		7:23
10.	"Day Tripper"		3:12
11.	"Lady Madonna"		2:33
12.	"I Saw Her Standing There" (with Billy Joel)		3:09
13.	"Yesterday"		2:17
14.	"Helter Skelter"		3:53
15.	"Get Back"		4:00
16.	"Sgt. Pepper's Lonely Hearts Club Band (Reprise)/The End"		4:28
Total length:			62:37

DVD
No.	Title	Writer(s)	Length
1.	"Drive My Car"
2.	"Jet"	McCartney, McCartney
3.	"Only Mama Knows"	McCartney
4.	"Flaming Pie"	McCartney
5.	"Got to Get You into My Life"
6.	"Let Me Roll It"	McCartney, McCartney
7.	"Highway"	McCartney
8.	"The Long and Winding Road"
9.	"My Love"	McCartney, McCartney
10.	"Blackbird"
11.	"Here Today"	McCartney
12.	"Dance Tonight"	McCartney
13.	"Calico Skies"	McCartney
14.	"Mrs. Vandebilt"	McCartney, McCartney
15.	"Eleanor Rigby"
16.	"Sing the Changes"	McCartney
17.	"Band on the Run"	McCartney, McCartney
18.	"Back in the USSR"
19.	"I'm Down"
20.	"Something"	Harrison
21.	"I've Got a Feeling"
22.	"Paperback Writer"
23.	"A Day in the Life/Give Peace a Chance"	Lennon, McCartney/Lennon
24.	"Let It Be"
25.	"Live and Let Die"	McCartney, McCartney
26.	"Hey Jude"
27.	"Day Tripper"
28.	"Lady Madonna"
29.	"I Saw Her Standing There" (with Billy Joel)
30.	"Yesterday"
31.	"Helter Skelter"
32.	"Get Back"
33.	"Sgt. Pepper's Lonely Hearts Club Band (reprise)/The End"
Total length:			2:34:27

=== Deluxe Edition Bonus DVD ===
All tracks are written by Lennon–McCartney, unless otherwise noted.

Live on the Late Show with David Letterman
No.	Title	Writer(s)	Length
1.	"Get Back"
2.	"Sing the Changes"	McCartney
3.	"Coming Up"	McCartney
4.	"Band on the Run"	McCartney, McCartney
5.	"Let Me Roll It"	McCartney, McCartney
6.	"Helter Skelter"
7.	"Back in the USSR"
Total length:			47:04

- Good Evening People (audience documentary film)
- "I'm Down" (full performance)

== Personnel ==
- Paul McCartney – lead vocals, bass guitar, acoustic guitar, piano, electric guitar, ukulele, mandolin
- Rusty Anderson – electric and acoustic guitars, backing vocals, co-lead vocals on "I've Got a Feeling"
- Brian Ray – bass guitar, rhythm and acoustic guitars, backing vocals
- Paul Wickens – keyboards, electric guitar, accordion, harmonica, percussion, backing vocals
- Abe Laboriel Jr. – drums, percussion, backing vocals
- Billy Joel – co-lead vocals and piano on "I Saw Her Standing There"

This is the same band which performed on McCartney's previous live album Back in the U.S.. Wickens had been with McCartney since his first live album Tripping the Live Fantastic in 1990.

== Charts ==
=== Weekly charts ===
Chart (2009–2010)	Peak position
Belgian Albums (Ultratop Flanders)	76
Belgian Albums (Ultratop Wallonia)	56
Canadian Albums (Billboard)	23
Danish Albums (Hitlisten)	11
Dutch Albums (Album Top 100)	21
French Albums (SNEP)	57
German Albums (Offizielle Top 100)	54
Greek Albums (IFPI)	37
Irish Albums (IRMA)	42
Italian Albums (FIMI)	61
Japanese Albums (Oricon)	18
Mexican Albums (AMPROFON)	20
Norwegian Albums (VG-lista)	8
Scottish Albums (OCC)	26
Spanish Albums (Promusicae)	52
Swedish Albums (Sverigetopplistan)	29
UK Albums (OCC)	28
US Billboard 200	16
US Top Rock Albums (Billboard)	5

=== Year-end charts ===
Chart (2010)	Position
US Billboard 200	133
US Top Rock Albums (Billboard)	33

=== Certifications ===
Region	Certification	Certified units/sales
United Kingdom (BPI)	Silver	60,000^{*}
United States (RIAA)	Gold	500,000^{^}
^{*} Sales figures based on certification alone.^{^} Shipments figures based on certification alone.

== Release history ==
Country	Date
United States	17 November 2009
United Kingdom	14 December 2009

== See also ==
- The Beatles at Shea Stadium
- Summer Live '09
