= My, I'm Large =

Studio album by The Bobs
- Released: 1987
- Recorded: Russian Hill Recording; San Francisco, California
- Genre: A cappella; new wave
- Length: 41:10
- Label: Rhino
- Producer: Richard Greene

The Bobs chronology
The Bobs (1983)	My, I'm Large (1987)	Songs for Tomorrow Morning (1988)

Professional ratings
Review scores
Source	Rating
AllMusic	4/5 stars

My, I'm Large is the second a cappella album by the Bobs released in 1987. Though considered a studio album, four tracks were culled from live performances. The album included cover versions of Smokey Robinson's "You've Really Got a Hold on Me" and Sam the Sham and the Pharaohs' "Little Red Riding Hood".

== Track listing ==
All tracks written by Gunnar Madsen and Richard Green, except where noted.

No.	Title	Writer(s)	Length
1.	"My, I'm Large"		3:57
2.	"Helmet"		3:03
3.	"My Husband was a Weatherman" (live)		3:23
4.	"Mopping, Mopping, Mopping"		4:04
5.	"Bulky Rhythm" (live)		3:02
6.	"You've Really Got a Hold on Me"	Smokey Robinson	3:42
7.	"Johnny's Room"		2:30
8.	"Please Let Me Be Your Third World Country"		3:26
9.	"Valentino's" (live)		3:20
10.	"Banana Love"		2:51
11.	"Little Red Riding Hood"	Ron Blackwell	3:20
12.	"My Shoes"	Gunnar Madsen; Richard Green; Mark Pritchard	4:44
Total length:			41:10

== Personnel ==
- Gunnar "Bob" Madsen – vocals
- Matthew "Bob" Stull – vocals
- Janie "Bob" Scott – vocals
- Richard "Bob" Greene – vocals
