= The Bobs (album) =

Studio album by the Bobs
- Released: 1983
- Recorded: Russian Hill Recording (San Francisco, California)
- Genre: A cappella; new wave
- Length: 35:41 (LP), 44:53 (CD)
- Label: Kaleidoscope
- Producer: Richard Greene

The Bobs chronology
The Bobs (1983)	My, I'm Large (1987)

Professional ratings
Review scores
Source	Rating
AllMusic	4/5 stars

The Bobs is the debut studio album by American a cappella vocal group the Bobs, released in 1983 by Kaleidoscope Records. The group's music is sometimes referred to as New Wave A Cappella. The vocal arrangement of "Helter Skelter" was nominated for a Grammy Award in 1984.

== Track listing ==
All songs written by Gunnar Madsen and Richard Greene except as indicated:

=== LP ===
1. "Art for Art's Sake" – 2:58
2. "Prisoner of Funk" – 4:03
3. "I Hate the Beach Boys" – 3:11
4. "Bus Plunge" – 2:36
5. "Cowboy Lips" – 3:26
6. "Helter Skelter" (Lennon, McCartney) – 1:52
7. "Through the Wall" – 3:55
8. "Be My Yoko" – 2:20
9. "Lazy Susan" – 3:04
10. "Trash" – 3:33
11. "The Deprogrammer" – 4:43

=== CD ===
1. "Art for Art's Sake" – 2:58
2. "Prisoner of Funk" – 4:03
3. "I Hate The Beach Boys" – 3:11
4. "Bus Plunge" – 2:36
5. "Cowboy Lips" – 3:26
6. "Helter Skelter" (Lennon, McCartney) – 1:52
7. "Through the Wall" – 3:55
8. "Be My Yoko" (Pritchard) – 2:20
9. "Lazy Susan" – 3:04
10. "Nose to Nose" – 2:02
11. "Trash" – 3:33
12. "The Deprogrammer" – 4:43
13. "Eddie the Jinx" – 3:22
14. "Democratic Process" – 2:23
15. "Psycho Killer" (Byrne, Weymouth, Frantz) – 3:27

== Personnel ==
Credits are adapted from The Bobs liner notes.

- Gunnar "Bob" Madsen – vocals
- Matthew "Bob" Stull – vocals
- Janie "Bob" Scott – vocals (except "Eddie the Jinx")
- Richard "Bob" Greene – vocals
- Madsen/Greene – vocoder and keyboards
- Brad Bill Horn – drums on "Eddie the Jinx"
