= Rock 'n' Roll Music (album) =

Compilation album by the Beatles
- Released: 7 June 1976
- Recorded: 11 February 1963 – 28 January 1969
- Studios: EMI and Apple, London
- Genre: Rock & roll
- Length: 73:45
- Labels: Capitol (US); Parlophone (UK)
- Producer: George Martin

The Beatles chronology
The Singles Collection 1962–1970 (1976)	Rock 'n' Roll Music (1976)	The Beatles at the Hollywood Bowl (1977)

Singles from Rock 'n' Roll Music
- 1. "Got to Get You into My Life" Released: 31 May 1976 (US); 2. "Back in the U.S.S.R." Released: 25 June 1976 (UK)

Alternate cover
- Rock 'n' Roll Music, Vol. 2 (1980)

Rock 'n' Roll Music is a compilation album by the Beatles containing previously released tracks. It was issued on 7 June 1976 in the United States, on Capitol Records (catalogue number SKBO 11537), and on 11 June on Parlophone (PCSP 719) in the United Kingdom. A double album, the 28-track compilation includes 15 Lennon–McCartney songs, one George Harrison composition ("Taxman"), and a dozen cover versions of songs written by significant rock and roll composers of the 1950s, including Chuck Berry, Little Richard, Carl Perkins and Larry Williams. Not counting the 1971 Spanish compilation album, Por Siempre Beatles, Rock 'n' Roll Music was the first Beatles album to include "I'm Down", which had previously only been available as the B-side of the "Help!" single.

== Development and release ==
This album is described as "troubled" by Beatles producer George Martin in his autobiography, as he was asked by Bhaskar Menon, the president of Capitol Records at the time, to approve the tapes they intended to use, and he was "appalled" because they were some of the early twin-track mono tapes they had made and were going to be transferred to stereo for the issue. Instead of approving the album as it was presented to him, Martin reworked the already mixed tapes for every song, reversing the left and right channels and slightly narrowing the stereo on the tracks "Twist and Shout", "I Saw Her Standing There", "I Wanna Be Your Man", "Boys", "Roll Over Beethoven", "Drive My Car" and "I'm Down". Some of the song editing is not clean: for instance, the beginning of the crossfade of "Dear Prudence" can be heard during the fade of "Back in the U.S.S.R.", as originally issued on the White Album.

EMI Records refused to use Martin's modified Capitol tapes, citing the Beatles' strict instructions that any reissues had to be exactly as originally recorded. The UK Parlophone double album (Note: PCSP 719) contained the original UK mixes, including five stereo mixes of songs that had not yet been issued in stereo in the UK: the Long Tall Sally EP and "I'm Down". In October 1980, the album was divided into two single albums, and released as budget LPs in both the UK and the United States. Rock 'n' Roll Music: Volume 1 (Note: UK LP: EMI/Music for Pleasure MFP 50506, 24 October 1980; US LP: Capitol SN-16020, 27 October 1980) contained the songs on the first half of the original album, while Rock 'n' Roll Music: Volume 2 (Note: UK LP: EMI/Music for Pleasure MFP 50507, 24 October 1980; US LP: Capitol SN-16021, 27 October 1980) consisted of the second half. For these reissues, the UK versions were mastered using George Martin's reworked Capitol tapes.

=== Singles ===
In both the United States and Britain, Rock 'n' Roll Music was accompanied by a single compiled from songs on the album. The US single (Capitol 4274), was originally planned as "Helter Skelter" on the A-side and "Got to Get You into My Life" on the reverse, but when the Helter Skelter TV movie was announced for April 1976, Capitol thought better of the connotations and flipped the sides. "Got to Get You Into My Life" hit number 7 on the Billboard Hot 100. The British single (Parlophone R 6016), which consisted of "Back in the U.S.S.R." backed by "Twist and Shout", hit number 19.

== Packaging ==
Controversy surrounded the album's artwork, which featured an embossed colour portrait of the Beatles against a shiny silver background, with the album's title spelled out in what is presumed to be neon lights. Symbols of the 1950s were used on the inside of the album's gatefold sleeve, including a jukebox, an outdoor movie screen with a picture of Marilyn Monroe, an ice cream, a 1957 Chevrolet, a cheeseburger, and a glass of Coca-Cola. 1950s nostalgia was at a peak around the time the album was released and Capitol was clearly attempting to cash in on the trend. As the Beatles were a 1960s band, the album cover prompted Ringo Starr to complain to Rolling Stone: "It made us look cheap and we never were cheap. All that Coca-Cola and cars with big fins was the Fifties!" John Lennon was also critical of the artwork and wrote an angry letter to Capitol Records complaining it "looks like a Monkees reject" and suggested the cover instead use famous photos of the Beatles by Astrid Kirchherr or Jürgen Vollmer, both of whom had photographed the band during their Hamburg days. Lennon had also offered to design the cover himself, but was declined.

The budget-line albums replaced the controversial original artwork with a picture based on a photo of the Beatles in 1964. The US editions of the cover set the group in a crowd, while the British cover eliminated the crowd and placed the group against a stark white background.

== Commercial performance ==
Professional ratings
Review scores
Source	Rating
AllMusic	3.5/5 stars
The Encyclopedia of Popular Music	4/5 stars

Album sales benefited from a rather significant wave of Beatles nostalgia that was taking place during the summer of 1976. Interest in the band was undoubtedly boosted by Paul McCartney's "Wings over America" tour, which criss-crossed the United States and Canada shortly after Rock 'n' Roll Music was released. In addition, sales were not hurt by the fact that the album included the song "Helter Skelter", of which a cover version had been spotlighted in a made-for-television movie on the 1969 Charles Manson murders that aired shortly before the album was released. Rock 'n' Roll Music hit number 2 on the Billboard 200 in the US (kept off the top spot by McCartney's Wings at the Speed of Sound), and number 11 on the UK's Top 60 Albums Chart. It marked the second time a Beatles album competed with a Paul McCartney album over the top two positions on the Billboard chart. During the week ending June 6, 1970, the Beatles' album Let It Be jumped to the number 2 position from its previous week's debut at number 104, while McCartney's self-titled debut album McCartney held at number 1 for a third straight week. The next week, Let It Be bumped up to number 1, while McCartney slid to number 2, where both albums remained positioned for four consecutive weeks.

== Track listing ==
All songs written by Lennon–McCartney, except where noted

Side one
No.	Title	Writer(s)	Length
1.	"Twist and Shout"	Phil Medley, Bert Russell	2:31
2.	"I Saw Her Standing There"		2:56
3.	"You Can't Do That"		2:38
4.	"I Wanna Be Your Man"		1:59
5.	"I Call Your Name"		2:09
6.	"Boys"	Luther Dixon, Wes Farrell	2:28
7.	"Long Tall Sally"	Enotris Johnson, Richard Penniman, Robert Blackwell	2:00
Total length:			16:41

Side two
No.	Title	Writer(s)	Length
1.	"Rock and Roll Music"	Chuck Berry	2:30
2.	"Slow Down"	Larry Williams	2:54
3.	"Kansas City" / "Hey, Hey, Hey, Hey" (medley)	Jerry Leiber and Mike Stoller / Richard Penniman	2:35
4.	"Money (That's What I Want)"	Janie Bradford, Berry Gordy	2:47
5.	"Bad Boy"	Williams	2:20
6.	"Matchbox"	Carl Perkins	1:59
7.	"Roll Over Beethoven"	Berry	2:44
Total length:			17:49

Side three
No.	Title	Writer(s)	Length
1.	"Dizzy Miss Lizzy"	Williams	2:53
2.	"Any Time at All"		2:13
3.	"Drive My Car"		2:29
4.	"Everybody's Trying to Be My Baby"	Perkins	2:26
5.	"The Night Before"		2:37
6.	"I'm Down"		2:32
7.	"Revolution"		3:25
Total length:			18:35

Side four
No.	Title	Writer(s)	Length
1.	"Back in the U.S.S.R."		2:44
2.	"Helter Skelter"		4:30
3.	"Taxman"	George Harrison	2:39
4.	"Got to Get You into My Life"		2:31
5.	"Hey Bulldog"		3:11
6.	"Birthday"		2:43
7.	"Get Back" (album version)		3:09
Total length:			21:27

== Charts and certifications ==
=== Charts ===
Weekly chart performance for Rock 'n' Roll Music
Chart (1976)	Peak position
Australian Albums (Kent Music Report)	4
Austrian Albums (Ö3 Austria)	6
Canada Top Albums/CDs (RPM)	2
Finnish Albums (Suomen virallinen lista)	14
German Albums (Offizielle Top 100)	10
Italian Albums (Musica e dischi)	12
Norwegian Albums (VG-lista)	8
New Zealand Albums (RMNZ)	2
Swedish Albums (Sverigetopplistan)	18
UK Albums (Official Charts)	11
US Billboard 200	2

=== Year-end charts ===
1976 year-end chart performance for Rock 'n' Roll Music
Chart (1976)	Peak position
Australian Albums (Kent Music Report)	22
Canada Top Albums/CDs (RPM)	14
New Zealand Albums (RMNZ)	16

=== Certifications and sales ===
Certifications and sales for Rock 'n' Roll Music
Region	Certification	Certified units/sales
United Kingdom (BPI)	Gold	100,000^{^}
United States (RIAA)	Platinum	1,000,000^{^}
^{^} Shipments figures based on certification alone.
