= The Bobs =

American a cappella group

- Origin: San Francisco, California, U.S.
- Genres: New wave, a cappella, comedy rock, vocal jazz,
- Years active: 1981–2017
- Labels: Kaleidoscope, Rhino, Rounder, Cheap Toast
- Past members: Gunnar Madsen; Richard Greene; Matthew Stull; Janie Scott; Joe Finetti; Lori Rivera; Maureen Smith; Amy Engelhardt; Dan Schumacher; Angie Doctor
- Website: bobsacapella.com

The Bobs were an American a cappella vocal group founded in San Francisco, California, in 1981. Often described as a "band without instruments," The Bobs were known for their irreverent humor, complex vocal arrangements, original compositions, and inventive covers.

Over a 36-year career, they released 16 albums, received a Grammy nomination for their a cappella version of "Helter Skelter," and performed worldwide before retiring in 2017.

They are regarded as pioneers in the modern a cappella movement, noted for their extensive original material and genre-defying performances.

== History ==
=== Formation and early career (1981–1986) ===
The Bobs were formed in San Francisco in 1981 by Gunnar Madsen and Matthew Stull, who had previously worked as singing telegram performers. After placing a classified ad seeking a bass vocalist, they recruited recording engineer Richard Greene. Soprano Janie Scott joined shortly thereafter, completing the classic quartet line-up.

Initially performing quirky a cappella covers of songs by Talking Heads and Marty Robbins, the group gained a local following for their inventive vocal arrangements and comedic stage presence. They released their debut album, The Bobs, in 1983 on Kaleidoscope Records. The album featured both original material and offbeat covers, including a reinterpretation of The Beatles' "Helter Skelter," which earned them a Grammy Award nomination in 1984 for Best Vocal Arrangement for Two or More Voices.

The group's early success led to national touring and appearances on NPR and PBS. Their 1987 follow-up album, My, I'm Large, included a mix of studio and live tracks, further showcasing their signature style consisting of humor and satirical lyrics set to harmonically dense, instrument-free arrangements.

=== Lineup changes, 1990s growth (1987–1997) ===
In 1990, co-founder Gunnar Madsen left the group and was replaced by Joe Finetti, a vocalist and percussionist who introduced beatboxing and vocal percussion to the group's sound. His addition marked a stylistic shift, with The Bobs increasingly incorporating rhythmic textures into their performances.

That same year, they released Sing the Songs of…, a transitional album that included performances by both Madsen and Finetti, along with guest soprano Maureen Smith. The album won a Contemporary A Cappella Recording Award (CARA) for Best Album in 1992.

Between 1993 and 1997, The Bobs signed with Rounder Records and released five albums: Shut Up and Sing! (1993), Cover the Songs of... (1994), Plugged (1995), Too Many Santas! (1996), and i brow club (1997). These recordings further explored the boundaries of a cappella, with Plugged featuring vocal mimicry of electric guitars and drums, and Too Many Santas! offering satirical holiday-themed songs.

Soprano Janie Scott left the group in 1997 after a 15-year tenure and was briefly replaced by Lori Rivera. In 1998, Amy Engelhardt joined as soprano/alto, bringing songwriting and theatrical experience. Her voice and compositions became central to the group's sound through the 2000s.

=== Continued innovation (1998–2007) ===
With a refreshed lineup, The Bobs entered the new millennium with the release of Coaster (2000), showcasing witty songs such as "The Drive Time Blues" and "Barber Lips." Critics praised the group for maintaining their vocal precision and humor into their third decade.

In 2003, The Bobs performed with The Flying Karamazov Brothers in a collaborative stage show, and in 2005 they released Rhapsody in Bob, a reimagined vocal adaptation of George Gershwin's Rhapsody in Blue, accompanied by pianist Bob Malone. The album demonstrated the group's ability to reinterpret classical works through vocal orchestration.

In 2007, The Bobs released Get Your Monkey Off My Dog, and a 25th anniversary documentary titled Sign My Snarling Movie. That same year, they held reunion concerts in Berkeley, California, featuring all former members except Madsen, who had retired from touring.

=== Final years and disbandment (2008–2017) ===
Amy Engelhardt left the group in 2012 and was succeeded by alto Angie Doctor. With the final lineup of Stull, Greene, Schumacher, and Doctor, the group released their final studio album, Biographies, in 2013. It was a concept album of original songs centered on historical and cultural figures such as Nikola Tesla, Julia Child, and Andy Kaufman.

In 2017, after 36 years of performing and recording, The Bobs embarked on a farewell tour. Their final performance took place on October 21, 2017, at The Barns at Wolf Trap in Vienna, Virginia. The show concluded with their satirical anthem "Thank You for Singing."

== Musical style and legacy ==
The Bobs were known for blending vocal precision with offbeat comedy, delivering both original songs and radically reworked covers. While many a cappella groups of their era focused on doo-wop or barbershop styles, The Bobs emphasized experimental harmonies, vocal sound effects, and satire. They frequently employed vocal percussion, scat singing, and theatrical choreography in live performance.

They influenced a generation of contemporary vocal groups, including Pentatonix, Rockapella and Da Vinci's Notebook, and were among the first professional a cappella groups to emphasize original songwriting. According to The Washington Post, they "changed the world of a cappella for the better."

=== Soundtrack contributions ===
- The Bobs performed "Psycho Killer" on the revival of The Smothers Brothers Comedy Hour in 1988.
- The Bobs' recording of the Jimmy Cliff/Guilly Bright song "Sittin' In Limbo" was featured in the 1991 movie Cool As Ice.
- The Bobs' recording of the song "Barbara Ann" was used in the 1993 movie Surf Ninjas.
- In the 1995 Jason Alexander movie For Better or Worse, the Bobs performed most of the soundtrack, including the background music that occasionally interacted with the story. During the 1995 Emmy Awards, they performed a medley of television themes with Alexander.
- In 1996, the Bobs performed several original songs and provided the character voices for the online video game Castle Infinity.
- The Bobs supplied the opening music for the documentary I'm from Hollywood, starring inter-gender wrestling champion Andy Kaufman, directed by Lynne Margulies and Joe Orr. The song was played at the beginning of the Kaufman biopic Man on the Moon (1999).

== Members ==
Name	Role	Years active
Matthew Stull	Baritone	1981–2017
Gunnar Madsen	Tenor	1981–1990
Richard Greene	Bass	1981–2017
Janie Scott	Soprano	1982–1997
Joe Finetti	Tenor, vocal percussion	1990–2004
Lori Rivera	Soprano	1997–1998
Amy Engelhardt	Soprano, alto	1998–2012
Dan Schumacher	Tenor, vocal percussion	2004–2017
Angie Doctor	Alto	2012–2017
Maureen Smith	Soprano (studio only)	1991

All members adopted the stage moniker "Bob" as part of their persona.

== Discography ==
=== Studio albums ===
- The Bobs (1983)
- My, I'm Large (1987)
- Songs for Tomorrow Morning (1988)
- Sing the Songs of... (1991)
- Shut Up and Sing! (1993)
- Cover the Songs of... (1994)
- Plugged (1995)
- Too Many Santas! (1996)
- i brow club (1997)
- Coaster (2000)
- Rhapsody in Bob (2005)
- Get Your Monkey Off My Dog (2007)
- Biographies (2013)

=== Compilations and live ===
- The Best of the Bobs: 20 Songs from 20 Years (2003)
- Songs at Any Speed (2008)

=== Video releases ===
- The Bobs on PBS's Lonesome Pine Special (1989)
- The Bobs on PBS's Lonesome Pine Special – ISOBOBS (with dance group ISO) (1990)
- Live at the 20th Century (1998)
- The Bobs Sing! (and Other Love Songs) (2000)
- Sign My Snarling Movie: 25 Years of The Bobs (2007)

== Awards ==
- Grammy Award Nomination – Best Vocal Arrangement for Two or More Voices, 1984 ("Helter Skelter")
- Contemporary A Cappella Recording Awards (multiple wins and nominations)
