= Back in the U.S.S.R. =

1968 song by the Beatles

Song by the Beatles

from the album The Beatles
- Released: 22 November 1968
- Recorded: 22–23 August 1968
- Studio: EMI, London
- Genre: Hard rock; rock and roll
- Length: 2:43
- Label: Apple
- Songwriter: Lennon–McCartney
- Producer: George Martin

Music video
- "Back in the U.S.S.R. (2018 Mix)" on YouTube

"Back in the U.S.S.R."

Single by the Beatles

from the album Rock 'n' Roll Music
- B-side: "Twist and Shout"
- Released: 25 May 1976
- Label: Parlophone

The Beatles UK singles chronology
"Yesterday" (1976)	"Back in the U.S.S.R." (1976)	"Sgt. Pepper's Lonely Hearts Club Band" / "With a Little Help from My Friends" (1978)

"Back in the U.S.S.R." is a song by the English rock band the Beatles. It is the opening track on their 1968 double album, The Beatles (also known as the "White Album"). Written by Paul McCartney and credited to the Lennon–McCartney partnership, the song is a parody of Chuck Berry's "Back in the U.S.A." and the Beach Boys' "California Girls". The lyrics subvert Berry's patriotic sentiments about the United States, as the narrator expresses relief upon returning home to the Soviet Union.

The Beatles recorded "Back in the U.S.S.R." as a three-piece after Ringo Starr temporarily left the group, in protest at McCartney's criticism of his drumming and the tensions that typified the sessions for the White Album. Instead, the other Beatles created a composite drum track from numerous takes. McCartney's singing was based on Jerry Lee Lewis, while the bridge features a Beach Boys–style celebration of girls from various parts of the USSR. The song opens and closes with the sound effect of an aircraft taking off and landing.

Released three months after the Warsaw Pact's invasion of Czechoslovakia, the Beatles' sympathetic portrayal of the USSR prompted condemnation in the West from both the New Left and the political right. In 1976, backed by "Twist and Shout", it was issued as a single to promote the compilation album Rock 'n' Roll Music. It peaked at number 19 on the UK Singles Chart and number 11 in Ireland. In 2003, McCartney performed the song in Moscow's Red Square. Elton John and Billy Joel have also released versions recorded during concerts in Russia.

== Background and inspiration ==
Paul McCartney began writing the song as "I'm Backing the UK", inspired by the "I'm Backing Britain" campaign, which had gained wide national support in January 1968, a month before the Beatles departed for India to undertake a course in Transcendental Meditation. According to author Ian MacDonald, McCartney altered the title to "I'm Backing the USSR" and then, drawing on Chuck Berry's 1959 hit song "Back in the U.S.A.", arrived at the song's eventual title. Donovan, the Scottish singer-songwriter who joined the Beatles in India, said that "Back in the U.S.S.R." was one of the "funny little ditties" that McCartney regularly played at the ashram, adding that "of course, melodious ballads just poured out of him".

In a November 1968 interview for Radio Luxembourg, McCartney said the song was inspired by Berry's "Back in the U.S.A." and was written from the point of view of a Russian spy returning home to the USSR after an extended mission in the United States. Mike Love of the Beach Boys, another student at the meditation retreat, recalled McCartney playing "Back in the U.S.S.R." on acoustic guitar over breakfast in Rishikesh, at which point he suggested to McCartney that the bridge section should focus on the "girls" in Russia, in the style of the Beach Boys' "California Girls". (Note: Love added: "Of course, he needed no help in writing a song, but he later acknowledged that I helped him out on the bridge. A tape still exists of he and I playing around with the song.") In his 1984 interview with Playboy magazine, McCartney said he wrote it as "a kind of Beach Boys parody" based on "Back in the U.S.A." He added:

I just liked the idea of Georgia girls and talking about places like the Ukraine as if they were California, you know? It was also hands across the water, which I'm still conscious of. 'Cause they like us out there [in Soviet Russia], even though the bosses in the Kremlin may not.

In his lyrics, McCartney transposed the patriotism of Berry's song into a Soviet context. He said that he intended it to be a "spoof" on the typical American international traveller's contention that "it's just so much better back home" and their yearning for the comforts of their homeland. McCartney said that, despite the lack of luxuries in the USSR, his Soviet traveller would "still be every bit as proud [of his home country] as an American would be". According to author Michael Gray, "Back in the U.S.S.R." was the Beatles' sardonic comment on Berry's idealised Americana, which had become "deeply unfashionable" by the late 1960s. (Note: In 2003, when he played his first concert in Russia, McCartney described the song as "a pisstake on Chuck Berry's 'Back in the USA'".)

== Composition ==
"Back in the U.S.S.R." opens and closes with the sound of a turboprop aircraft landing on a runway. The effect also appears partway through the recording and represents an "aural cartoon", according to music critic Tim Riley, who says the song is "offered as a hoot and delivered as such". The opening lyrics refer to a "dreadful" flight back to the USSR from Miami Beach in the United States, on board a BOAC airliner. Driven by McCartney's uptempo piano playing and Harrison's lead guitar riffs, the lyrics tell of the singer's happiness on returning home, where "the Ukraine girls really knock me out" and the "Moscow girls make me sing and shout". He invites these women to "Come and keep your comrade warm" and looks forward to hearing the sound of "balalaikas ringing out".

Cultural historian Doyle Greene describes the song as a parody of Berry's "Back in the U.S.A." "with a bridge that parodies the Beach Boys' 'California Girls'". According to Riley, while "Back in the U.S.S.R." is usually viewed as a Beach Boys parody – specifically, a "send-up" of "California Girls" and "Surfin' U.S.A." – its "more direct association" is with Berry's track. (Note: Love said that the song was the Beatles' "take" on the Beach Boys, but a gesture he considered "light-hearted and humorous".) He adds that Berry's focus on commercialism is "relocated and mocked" such that "the joyous return to the Soviet homeland is sarcastic camp." McCartney's lyrics also contain an allusion to Hoagy Carmichael's and Stuart Gorrell's "Georgia on My Mind". He sings about the female population of the Soviet Republic of Georgia, right after mentioning "the Ukraine girls" and "Moscow girls".

== Recording ==
The sessions for The Beatles (also known as the "White Album") were fraught with disharmony among the band members. While rehearsing "Back in the U.S.S.R." on 22 August 1968, Ringo Starr became tired of McCartney's criticism of his drumming on the song and of the bad atmosphere generally and walked out, intent on quitting the group. The other Beatles continued with the session, which took place at EMI Studios (now Abbey Road Studios) in London. Ken Scott, the band's recording engineer, later recalled that they created a "composite drum track of bits and pieces" in Starr's absence. (Note: According to author Kenneth Womack, the song was originally intended for Twiggy, a young English model and singer, to record.)

Five takes were recorded of the basic track, featuring McCartney on drums, George Harrison on electric guitar, and John Lennon on Fender Bass VI. Take 5 was chosen as "best". During the overdubbing on the song, on 23 August, McCartney and Harrison also contributed bass parts, and both also added lead guitar parts. According to author John Winn, the first overdubs were piano, played by McCartney; drums by Harrison, replacing Lennon's bass part from the previous day; and another electric guitar part.

After these additions were mixed down to a single track, McCartney sang a lead vocal, using what he described as his "Jerry Lee Lewis voice", and Lennon, Harrison and McCartney added backing vocals, including Beach Boys-style harmonies over the song's bridges. All three musicians added handclaps. Other overdubs included McCartney's bass, Harrison on six-string bass, and Lennon playing a snare drum. Harrison played the guitar solo in the instrumental break, while McCartney contributed a high-pitched, single-note solo over the final verse. MacDonald describes the musical arrangement as a "thunderous wall of sound". For the sounds of the aircraft that appear on the track, Scott used a recording of a Viscount turboprop stored in EMI's library.

After the other Beatles urged him to return, Starr rejoined the group on 4 September to participate in the filming of a promotional clip for their "Hey Jude" single. (Note: The following day, to celebrate Starr's return to the recording studio, Harrison covered his drum kit in flowers.) During a break in the filming, Marc Sinden (who appears in the film) recalls Lennon playing a song on his acoustic guitar. "Everyone went 'Wow' ... Filming started before we could ask what it was. When it was later released, we realised it was 'Back in the USSR'."

== Release ==
Apple Records released The Beatles on 22 November 1968, with "Back in the U.S.S.R." sequenced as the opening song. The turboprop aircraft landing sound at the close of the track was cross-faded with the start of the next song, "Dear Prudence". In 1969, Apple issued "Back in the U.S.S.R." as a single in Scandinavia, backed by Starr's composition "Don't Pass Me By". In 1973, the song was included on the band's double album compilation 1967–1970, as one of only three tracks representing the White Album.

On 25 June 1976, the song was issued as a single by Parlophone in the UK to promote the compilation album Rock 'n' Roll Music. The B-side was "Twist and Shout", making it the first EMI single by the Beatles to include a non-original composition. (Note: To promote Rock 'n' Roll Music in the US, Capitol Records instead released "Got to Get You into My Life", backed by the White Album track "Helter Skelter".) It peaked at number 19 on the UK Singles Chart, number 11 in Ireland, and number 19 in Sweden. In September 2022, the British Phonographic Industry (BPI) awarded the song a silver certification for sales and streaming figures exceeding 200,000 units. EMI made a promotional film for the release, setting the song to footage of the Beatles visiting Amsterdam in 1964 and from their 1966 tour of West Germany. The single was subsequently included in the Beatles Singles Collection box set, released by EMI's World Division in December 1982, making it the 24th single in the series.

A version by Chubby Checker reached number 86 in Canada, April 28, 1969.

== Critical reception ==
In his album review for the NME, Alan Smith described the song as "A fantastic piece of screaming excitement. Great opener." Record Mirror's initial reviewer wrote: "The LP begins with a rock based, falsetto backed number called 'Back In The USSR' concerning the attributes of Russian women. Wild Harrison guitar and heavy brass lend that soul element as well." (Note: According to Winn, McCartney "mock[ed] overanalytical rock critics" during his 1968 Radio Luxembourg interview, by joking that "[The song] concerns the attributes of Russian women – sole element created by George's guitar and heavy brass!") Writing for the same publication, David Griffiths described the song as a "perfectly ingenious" opening track, since:

[I]t serves the purpose of disorientating (both politically and socially) the "average" listener whose mind is likely to be thoroughly confused by such lines as "Back in the US, back in the US, back in the USSR," and the use of rock and Beach Boy effects to praise Russian chicks. With both Georgias on his mind, perhaps the listener is rendered more receptive. The message comes across that nothing is as simple as it seems and the violence of the beat effectively demonstrates that The Beatles have not gone soft, or too arty, or too far away from the basics, despite their fame and riches.

Writing in Partisan Review, Geoffrey Cannon said that The Beatles showed the band failing to engage with the contemporary rock audience in the manner that the Rolling Stones had done on their 1968 album Beggars Banquet. In Cannon's view: "The Beatles kick out the jams only in their hard rock numbers: 'Back in the U.S.S.R.', 'Birthday' and 'Helter Skelter'. But the eclecticism of the first two numbers makes them evanescent. They may intend to be good jokes about the Beach Boys, Chuck Berry and Little Richard; in fact, they hide behind these out-front stars." In his review for The New York Times, Nik Cohn similarly complained that "they hide behind send-up: the middle eight of 'Back in the U.S.S.R.,' for instance, is pure surf-age Beach Boys but it's all half-hearted and limp".

Jann Wenner of Rolling Stone described "Back in the U.S.S.R." as the "perfect example" of the Beatles' ability to quote from others' work and "expand the idiom, but ... [also] to penetrate it and take it further" in a way that recent satirical albums by the Turtles and Frank Zappa had failed to do. He added: "It would be too simple to say that 'Back In the USSR' is a parody, because it operates on more levels than that: it is fine contemporary rock and roll and ... also a superb commentary on the United States S. R., hitting every insight – 'honey, disconnect the phone.' As well as a parody, it's also a Beatles song." (Note: In his review for International Times, Barry Miles said that "'Back In the USSR' is of course [a] parody of Chuck Berry's 'Back In the USA' only this medium rocker doesn't put down the USSR, it parodies the USA.") Richard Goldstein of The New York Times praised the double album's "burlesque of musical forms", saying that it represented "almost a mock-history of pop" in which "Back in the U.S.S.R." was "a rock primer, quoting the Jefferson Airplane, the Beach Boys, Jerry Lee Lewis and Ray Charles".

Tim Riley describes "Back in the U.S.S.R." as "Brian Wilson with sex appeal" and an example of how, further to "Lady Madonna", several of McCartney's 1968 compositions "straddle the ironic distance between genre treatments and fresh, inventive material that stands well on its own". (Note: Asked for his feelings on the song, Wilson said he was unaware that it was a send-up of "California Girls" until someone pointed it out. He added, "I thought it was really adorable." While acknowledging Wilson's "well-known" influence on McCartney, songwriter Paul Zollo described the song as McCartney and the Beatles' "most overt Brian-inspired composition" and recalled an occasion in which Wilson "sang for me all of 'Back in the U.S.S.R.'" during a lunch outing. Wilson also told Zollo that the song "blew my mind" when he first heard it.) In his book on the White Album, David Quantick cites the song as an example of McCartney's standing as "a master of pastiche and parody", adding that "In lesser, feebler, hands, 'Back in the U.S.S.R.' could have been a rotten comedy song, a weak parody tune, but McCartney – cocky, confident, and able to do almost anything musically – made it into something amazing." Quantick admires the three Beatles' musicianship and "hilarious" harmony vocals, and concludes: "The whole thing rocks – and rocks substantially more than the Beach Boys ever did." In a review coinciding with the album's 40th anniversary, John Bohannon of PopMatters similarly praised the band's performance, including the guitar work and a McCartney vocal that he deemed "one of the best hard rock vocal[s] delivered from below the belt".

In 2010, Rolling Stone ranked "Back in the U.S.S.R." at number 85 on the magazine's list of the "100 Greatest Beatles Songs". In a similar list compiled by Mojo in 2006, it appeared at number 64. In his commentary for the magazine, English singer Billy Bragg said that 1968 was when "our love affair with all things American began to turn sour", with the year marked by reports of US atrocities in Vietnam, the assassinations of Martin Luther King and Robert Kennedy, the gesture of African-American athletes introducing Black Power politics at the Mexico Olympic Games, and Richard Nixon's victory in the US presidential race. Bragg added: "By opening [the White Album] with this wonderful inversion of Chuck Berry's 'Back In The USA', The Beatles made clear whose side they were on ... Subversive or just mischievous? You decide." In 2018, the music staff of Time Out London ranked the song at number 26 on their list of the best Beatles songs.

== Political controversy and cultural significance ==
Like "Revolution" and "Piggies", "Back in the U.S.S.R." prompted immediate responses in the US from the New Left and the Right. Among the latter, the John Birch Society's magazine cited the song as further evidence of the Beatles' supposed pro-Soviet sentiments. The line "You don't know how lucky you are, boys" left many anti-communist groups stunned. In Riley's view, the song's mocking tone and communist setting thereby had "the desired effect of inciting the [ire]" of the John Birch Society, who misunderstood the lyrics' "sympathetic socialism".

Ian MacDonald described the song as "a rather tactless jest", given that the Soviet Army had recently invaded Czechoslovakia and thwarted that country's attempt to introduce democratic reforms. (Note: Beginning on 21 August, the invasion was carried out by the USSR and other countries in the Warsaw Pact. Within two days, the liberal measures introduced by Czech leader Alexander Dubček had been overturned in favour of a return to authoritarian rule.) Some members of the New Left also criticised the Beatles for this gesture. During the 1960s, the Beatles were officially derided in the Soviet Union as the "belch of Western culture". David Noebel, a longstanding critic of the Beatles' influence on Western youth, said that: "The lyrics have left even the Reds speechless."

Writing for the website Russia Beyond, Tommy O'Callaghan describes "Back in the U.S.S.R." as a "parody that became a peace offering". He says that, just as the Beatles provided a source of unity with the West for contemporary Russian music fans, the band set out to mock the "new Western narrative" presented by both McCarthyism and the New Left. Aside from the send-ups of the Beach Boys, Berry's "flag-waving" song and Prime Minister Harold Wilson's "I'm Backing Britain" campaign, O'Callaghan views the references to Russian girls as mocking the "perceived unsexiness" of Soviet culture and says that the song's true satirical qualities are in "its portrayal of Russians and Americans at parity".

Although the Beatles never performed in the USSR, Elton John was permitted to visit the country in 1979 in a historic concert tour, which Billboard magazine referred to as the first there by an "out-and-out rock artist". He sang "Back in the U.S.S.R." as his closing song throughout the tour, ignoring an official request after his opening show that he not do so. Video from these concerts appeared in the documentary film To Russia with Elton.

In the 1980s, McCartney was refused permission to perform in the USSR. In Barry Miles' 1997 book Paul McCartney: Many Years from Now, McCartney said that: "Probably my single most important reason for going to Russia would be to play ['Back in the U.S.S.R.']" According to The Moscow Times, when McCartney finally got to play the song on his Back in the World tour in Moscow's Red Square in May 2003, "the crowd went wild". When asked about the song before the concert, McCartney said he had known little about the Soviet Union when he wrote it and added: "It was a mystical land then. It's nice to see the reality. I always suspected that people had big hearts. Now I know that's true." In his autobiography, Good Vibrations, Mike Love writes: "'Back in the U.S.S.R.' was a helluva song, and it's lasted longer than the country."

In 1987, Billy Joel covered the song on his live-in-the-Soviet Union album Kohuept. Also released as a single, his version reached number 33 in Australia and number 44 in New Zealand. McCartney said in 1997 that Joel's adoption of "Back in the U.S.S.R." for his Russian concert tours had contributed to the "jokey" song's standing as "a bit of an anthem now".

On 4 July 1984, the Beach Boys played "Back in the U.S.S.R.", with Starr joining them as a special guest, during their Fourth of July concerts in Washington, DC, and Miami. In Love's recollection, the "irony" of an Englishman being part of the celebrations for America's independence from Britain "was not lost on Ringo". Starr told a reporter: "Happy Birthday [America] ... Sorry we lost."

In 2022, The Spokesman-Review and The Dallas Morning News noted the absence of "Back in the U.S.S.R.", a usual staple of McCartney's live concerts, from the setlist of his Got Back tour, in light of the 2022 Russian invasion of Ukraine. Immediately preceding the encore at each stop on the tour, McCartney and his fellow band members left the stage and each returned with a flag: the flag of the United Kingdom, the flag of the country they were performing in, an LGBT pride flag, and, in 2022, the flag of Ukraine, as well as the state flag of whichever US state the concert took place in (for example, the flag of Texas at the show in Fort Worth, Texas, and the flag of Florida at the show in Hollywood, Florida).

== Personnel ==
According to Ian MacDonald and Mark Lewisohn:

- Paul McCartney – double-tracked lead vocals, backing vocal, piano, bass guitar, drums, lead guitar, handclaps, percussion
- John Lennon – backing vocals, rhythm guitar, six-string bass, handclaps, drums, percussion
- George Harrison – backing vocals, rhythm and lead guitars, six-string bass, handclaps, drums, percussion

== Charts ==
Weekly chart performance for "Back in the U.S.S.R."
Chart (1976–80)	Peak position
New Zealand (Recorded Music NZ)	44
Sweden (Sverigetopplistan)	19
UK Singles (OCC)	19

== Certifications ==
Region	Certification	Certified units/sales
United Kingdom (BPI)	Silver	200,000^{‡}
^{‡} Sales+streaming figures based on certification alone.

== Sources ==
- Aldridge, Alan, ed. (1990). The Beatles Illustrated Lyrics. Boston, MA: Houghton Mifflin/Seymour Lawrence. ISBN 0-395-59426-X.
- Badman, Keith (2001). The Beatles Diary Volume 2: After the Break-Up 1970–2001. London: Omnibus Press. ISBN 978-0-7119-8307-6.
- The Beatles (2000). The Beatles Anthology. San Francisco, CA: Chronicle Books. ISBN 0-8118-2684-8.
- Campbell, Michael (2008). Rock and Roll: An Introduction. Cengage Learning. ISBN 978-0-534-64295-2.
- Clayson, Alan (2003). Ringo Starr. London: Sanctuary. ISBN 1-86074-488-5.
- DeCouto, David John (2018). Captain Fantastic: The Definitive Biography of Elton John in the '70s. Chandler, AZ: Triple Wood Press. ISBN 978-1980762485.
- Everett, Walter (1999). The Beatles as Musicians: Revolver Through the Anthology. New York, NY: Oxford University Press. ISBN 978-0-19-512941-0.
- Greene, Doyle (2016). Rock, Counterculture and the Avant-Garde, 1966–1970: How the Beatles, Frank Zappa and the Velvet Underground Defined an Era. Jefferson, NC: McFarland. ISBN 978-1-4766-6214-5.
- Hertsgaard, Mark (1996). A Day in the Life: The Music and Artistry of the Beatles. London: Pan Books. ISBN 0-330-33891-9.
- Leitch, Donovan (2005). The Autobiography of Donovan: The Hurdy Gurdy Man. New York, NY: St. Martin's Press. ISBN 978-0-312-35252-3.
- Lewisohn, Mark (2005) [1988]. The Complete Beatles Recording Sessions: The Official Story of the Abbey Road Years 1962–1970. London: Bounty Books. ISBN 978-0-7537-2545-0.
- Love, Mike (2017). Good Vibrations: My Life as a Beach Boy. London: Faber & Faber. ISBN 978-0-571-32469-9.
- MacDonald, Ian (2005). Revolution in the Head: The Beatles' Records and the Sixties (2nd rev. edn). Chicago, IL: Chicago Review Press. ISBN 978-1-55652-733-3.
- Miles, Barry (1997). Paul McCartney: Many Years from Now. New York, NY: Henry Holt and Company. ISBN 0-8050-5249-6.
- Quantick, David (2002). Revolution: The Making of the Beatles' White Album. Chicago, IL: A Cappella Books. ISBN 1-55652-470-6.
- Riley, Tim (2002) [1988]. Tell Me Why – The Beatles: Album by Album, Song by Song, the Sixties and After. Cambridge, MA: Da Capo Press. ISBN 978-0-306-81120-3.
- Schaffner, Nicholas (1978). The Beatles Forever. New York, NY: McGraw-Hill. ISBN 0-07-055087-5.
- Spizer, Bruce (2003). The Beatles on Apple Records. New Orleans, LA: 498 Productions. ISBN 0-9662649-4-0.
- Turner, Steve (2009). The Beatles: The Stories Behind the Songs 1967–1970. Carlton. ISBN 978-1-84732-268-5.
- White, Timothy (1996). The Nearest Faraway Place: Brian Wilson, the Beach Boys, and the Southern Californian Experience. Macmillan. ISBN 0333649370.
- Wiener, Jon (1991). Come Together: John Lennon in His Time. Urbana, IL: University of Illinois Press. ISBN 978-0-252-06131-8.
- Winn, John C. (2009). That Magic Feeling: The Beatles' Recorded Legacy, Volume Two, 1966–1970. New York, NY: Three Rivers Press. ISBN 978-0-3074-5239-9.
- Womack, Kenneth (2014). The Beatles Encyclopedia: Everything Fab Four. Santa Barbara, CA: ABC-CLIO. ISBN 978-0-313-39171-2.
