= Got to Get You into My Life =

1966 song by the Beatles

- Cover of the Northern Songs sheet music

Song by the Beatles

from the album Revolver
- Released: 5 August 1966
- Recorded: 7 April & 17 June 1966
- Studio: EMI, London
- Genre: Rock; R&B; soul
- Length: 2:27 (stereo version); 2:35 (mono version)
- Label: Parlophone
- Songwriter: Lennon–McCartney
- Producer: George Martin

Official audio
- "Got To Get You Into My Life" (Remastered 2009) on YouTube

"Got to Get You into My Life"

Single by the Beatles

from the album Rock 'n' Roll Music
- B-side: "Helter Skelter"
- Released: 31 May 1976
- Label: Capitol

The Beatles US singles chronology
"The Long and Winding Road" (1970)	"Got to Get You into My Life" (1976)	"Ob-La-Di, Ob-La-Da" (1976)

"Got to Get You into My Life" is a song by the English rock band the Beatles, first released in 1966 on their album Revolver. It was written by Paul McCartney and credited to Lennon–McCartney.

A cover version by Cliff Bennett and the Rebel Rousers, produced by McCartney, peaked at number six in 1966 in the UK. The original Beatles version was issued in several countries as a single from the Rock 'n' Roll Music compilation album in 1976, six years after the Beatles disbanded, and reached number one in Canada. Another cover version by Earth, Wind & Fire from the Sgt. Pepper's Lonely Hearts Club Band film soundtrack peaked at number nine in the US in 1978.

== Composition and recording ==
Though officially credited to Lennon–McCartney, McCartney was primarily responsible for the writing of the song, to which he also contributed lead vocals. It was recorded at Abbey Road Studios between 7 April and 17 June 1966 and evolved considerably between the first takes and the final version released on album. The song seems to have been hard to arrange until the soul-style horns, strongly reminiscent of the Stax's Memphis soul and Motown sound, were introduced. The original version of the track, taped on the second day of the Revolver sessions, featured an arrangement that included harmonium and acoustic guitar, and a partly a-cappella section (repeating the words "I need your love") sung by McCartney, John Lennon and George Harrison. In the description of author Robert Rodriguez, relative to the "R&B-styled shouter" that the band completed in June, this version was "more Haight-Ashbury than Memphis". Author Devin McKinney similarly views the early take as "radiat[ing] peace in a hippie vein", and he recognises the arrangement as a forerunner to the sound adopted by the Beach Boys over 1967–1968 on their albums Smiley Smile and Wild Honey.

The brass was close-miked in the bells of the instruments, then put through a limiter. This session, on 18 May, marked the first time that the Beatles had used a horn section.

"Got to Get You into My Life"
Part of the song's second verse and ensuing chorus

The song starts with a blaring brass fanfare, McCartney's vocals entering at 0:07. The chorus of the song appears at 1:04, with the song's title sung. The song then switches between a verse and the refrain. A short electric guitar solo appears at 1:53 and at 2:10 the horn fanfare re-enters. The song closes with fading vocals of McCartney.

In Barry Miles' 1997 book Paul McCartney: Many Years from Now, McCartney disclosed that the song was about marijuana. "'Got to Get You into My Life' was one I wrote when I had first been introduced to pot ... So [it's] really a song about that, it's not to a person." Many lyrics from the song suggest this: "I took a ride, I didn't know what I would find there / Another road where maybe I could see some other kind of mind there.", '"What can I do? What can I be? When I'm with you, I want to stay there / If I am true, I will never leave and if I do, I'll know the way there." "It's actually an ode to pot," McCartney explained, "like someone else might write an ode to chocolate or a good claret."

== Release and reception ==
Parlophone released Revolver on 5 August 1966 with "Got to Get You into My Life" sequenced as the penultimate track, between Harrison's "I Want to Tell You" and Lennon's "Tomorrow Never Knows". According to Devin McKinney, while McCartney's songs can be heard individually as "simple affirmations", in the context of their placement on Revolver, "each song gains" from the reflected depth of the Lennon and Harrison compositions. McKinney writes that "Got to Get You into My Life" "is notable for being as expressive of a simple livid frustration as any McCartney music to date: its two minutes are a tight mass of constipated fury, an existential annoyance expressing itself as romantic confusion".

In his review of the song for AllMusic, Thomas Ward writes: "McCartney's always been a great vocalist, and this is perhaps the best example of his singing on Revolver. One of the overlooked gems on the album." Scott Plagenhoef of Pitchfork considers Revolver to be McCartney's "maturation record" as a songwriter in the same way that Rubber Soul had been for Lennon in 1965. He highlights "Got to Get You into My Life" as one of McCartney's "most demonstrative songs" on the album and a reflection of his innate "optimism and populism". Chris Coplan of Consequence of Sound admires the psychedelic tone of Revolver, but says that this experimentalism renders the more standard pop songs, such as "Got to Get You into My Life" and "Here, There and Everywhere", "seemingly out of place" within the collection.

Musicologist Walter Everett describes "Got to Get You into My Life" as "always ... one of the LP's most popular tracks" due to the success of its cover recordings, the first of which was a 1966 UK top-ten hit by Cliff Bennett and the Rebel Rousers, co-produced by McCartney, and the 1976 single release of the Beatles' original in countries including the United States, Canada, Australia, Germany and Japan. Music critic Tim Riley says the song is the "most derivative cut" on Revolver but nevertheless identifies it as an authentic rhythm and blues track that shows how well the Beatles had mastered the style. Riley especially praises the song's closing section, introduced by a Harrison guitar break that he describes as "dazzling" in sound and a combination of "crimped energy" and "tasty ornaments", followed by McCartney's vocal interplay with the brass.

When asked about the song in his 1980 Playboy interview, Lennon said, "Paul's again. I think that was one of his best songs, too."

== Charts ==
=== Weekly charts ===
Chart (1976)	Peak position
Australian Kent Music Report	93
Canadian RPM Top Singles	1
Canadian RPM Adult Contemporary	3
US Billboard Hot 100	7
US Billboard Adult Contemporary	9
US Cash Box Top 100	3

=== Year-end charts ===
Chart (1976)	Rank
Canadian RPM Top Singles	28
US Billboard Hot 100	78
US Cash Box	89

== Certifications ==
Region	Certification	Certified units/sales
United States (RIAA)	Gold	500,000^{^}
^{^} Shipments figures based on certification alone.

== Personnel ==
According to Ian MacDonald:

The Beatles

- Paul McCartney – double-tracked lead vocal, bass
- John Lennon – rhythm guitar (although MacDonald was unsure if Lennon played the rhythm guitar part)
- George Harrison – lead guitar
- Ringo Starr – drums, tambourine

Additional musicians

- George Martin – organ, producer, horn arrangements, conducting
- Eddie Thornton – trumpet
- Ian Hamer – trumpet
- Les Condon – trumpet
- Alan Branscombe – tenor saxophone
- Peter Coe – tenor saxophone

== Cliff Bennett and the Rebel Rousers version ==
English band Cliff Bennett and the Rebel Rousers released the first cover version of the song in August 1966, released the same day as the Beatles' album Revolver, on which the song appears.

=== Background ===
In early 1966, Cliff Bennett and the Rebel Rousers were the opening act for the Beatles on their final European tour. Bennett got the opportunity to hear "Got to Get You into My Life", which was used on the Revolver album, but was never released as a single. Bennett recorded it, with his own composition "Baby Each Day" appearing on the B-side. Paul McCartney produced the session. The record reached No. 6 on the UK chart, becoming Bennett's biggest ever hit. Bennett returned to the songbook of McCartney / Lennon in 1968 when he recorded "Back in the U.S.S.R." as Cliff Bennett and His Band.

== Earth, Wind & Fire version ==
"Got to Get You into My Life"
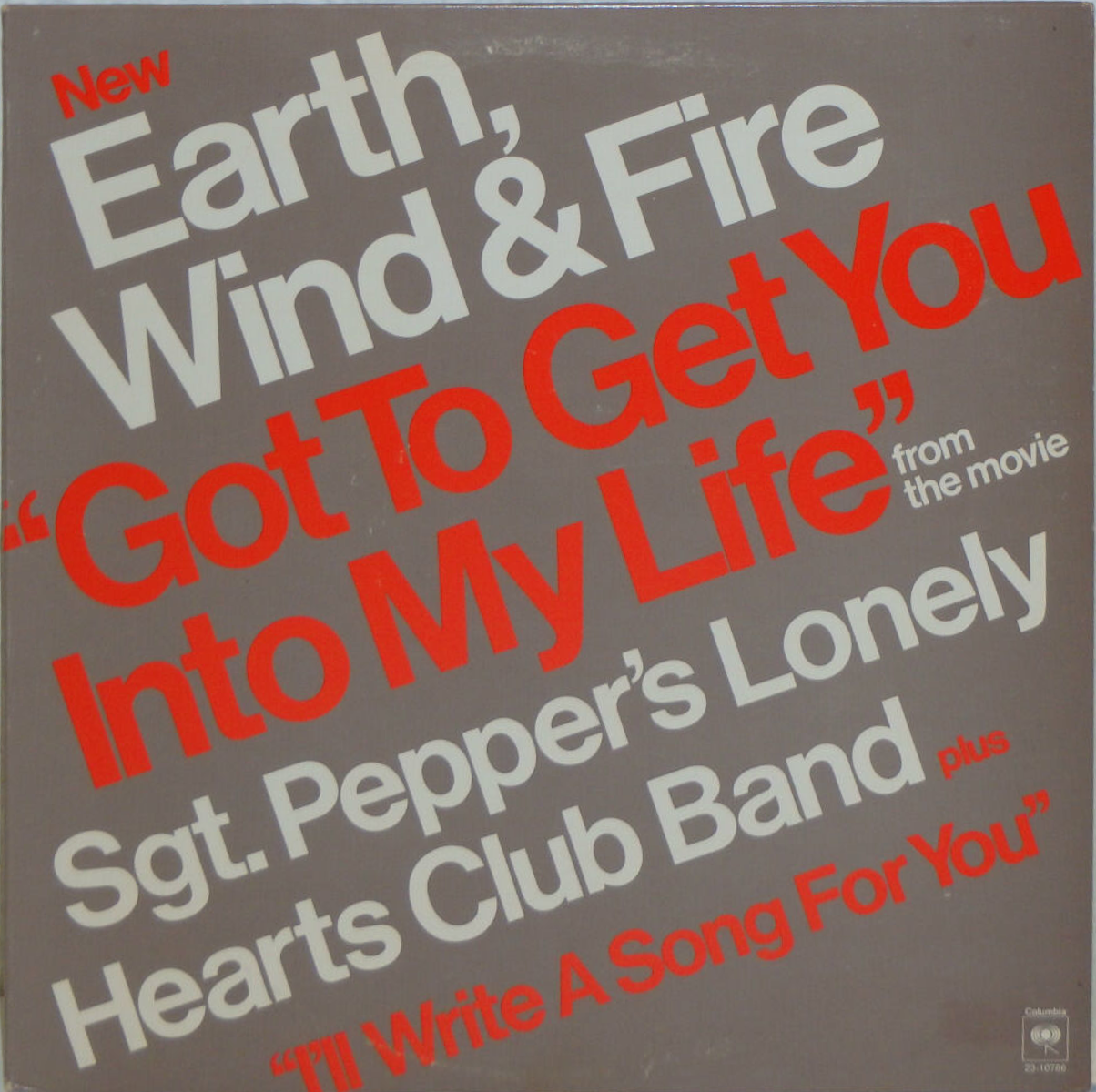
- US picture sleeve

Single by Earth, Wind & Fire

from the album Sgt. Pepper's Lonely Hearts Club Band (soundtrack) and The Best of Earth, Wind & Fire, Vol. 1 and The Eternal Dance
- B-side: "I'll Write a Song for You"
- Released: 14 July 1978
- Recorded: 1977
- Genre: R&B
- Length: 4:03
- Label: Columbia
- Songwriter: Lennon–McCartney
- Producer: Maurice White

Earth, Wind & Fire singles chronology
"Magic Mind" (1978)	"Got to Get You into My Life" (1978)	"September" (1978)

Official audio
- "Got to Get You into My Life" on YouTube

A cover version by Earth, Wind & Fire was recorded for and performed in the Beatles tribute film Sgt. Pepper's Lonely Hearts Club Band and included on the accompanying soundtrack album. It was issued as a single in July 1978 by Columbia Records. Their rendition reached No. 1 on the Billboard Hot Soul Singles chart and No. 9 on the Billboard Hot 100. The song also rose to No. 33 on the UK Singles chart. The single has been certified Gold in the US by the RIAA. It was also included on the compilation album The Best of Earth, Wind & Fire, Vol. 1 which was released in November 1978.

The guitar solo is by Al McKay.

=== Critical reception ===
The New York Daily News described Earth, Wind & Fire's version of "Got To Get You into My Life" as "oh-so-cool". Allmusic noted the tune as "a great remake". Cashbox also called EWF's cover of the song an "innovative rendition". Treble website placed this version as number thirty-four of "the top 100 cover songs". Record World said that "Maurice White's signature vocal and instrumental arrangements give extra life to the disc."

Earth, Wind & Fire's "Got to Get You into My Life" won a Grammy Award for Best Instrumental Arrangement Accompanying Vocalist(s). The song was also nominated for a Best Pop Performance by a Duo or Group with Vocals.

=== Chart performance ===
Chart (1978)	Peak position
Canada Top Singles (RPM)	11
Canada Adult Contemporary (RPM)	29
Netherlands (Single Top 100)	33
New Zealand (Recorded Music NZ)	20
UK Singles (Official Charts)	33
US Adult Contemporary (Billboard)	30
US Billboard Hot 100	9
US Billboard Hot Soul Singles	1

=== Certifications ===
Region	Certification	Certified units/sales
United States (RIAA)	Gold	1,000,000^{^}
^{^} Shipments figures based on certification alone.

== Other notable cover versions ==
- The Canadian group "The Stitch In Tyme" reached no. 36 in Canada with their version in March 1967.
- Blood, Sweat & Tears released the song on their 1975 album New City, with the single reaching no. 62 in the US and no. 59 in Canada.
