= List of Paul McCartney concert tours =

English musician Paul McCartney has participated in a number of concert tours across several eras of his musical career. With the British–American rock band Wings, he undertook five major tours, with one, the Wings Over the World tour, being worldwide. Following Wings' final 1979 tour of the UK, McCartney did not undergo a major concert tour for ten years. As a solo artist, McCartney has undergone sixteen major concert tours, nine being worldwide. His first was the Paul McCartney World Tour (1989–90) and his most recent being the Got Back tour (2022–2025).

== With Wings ==
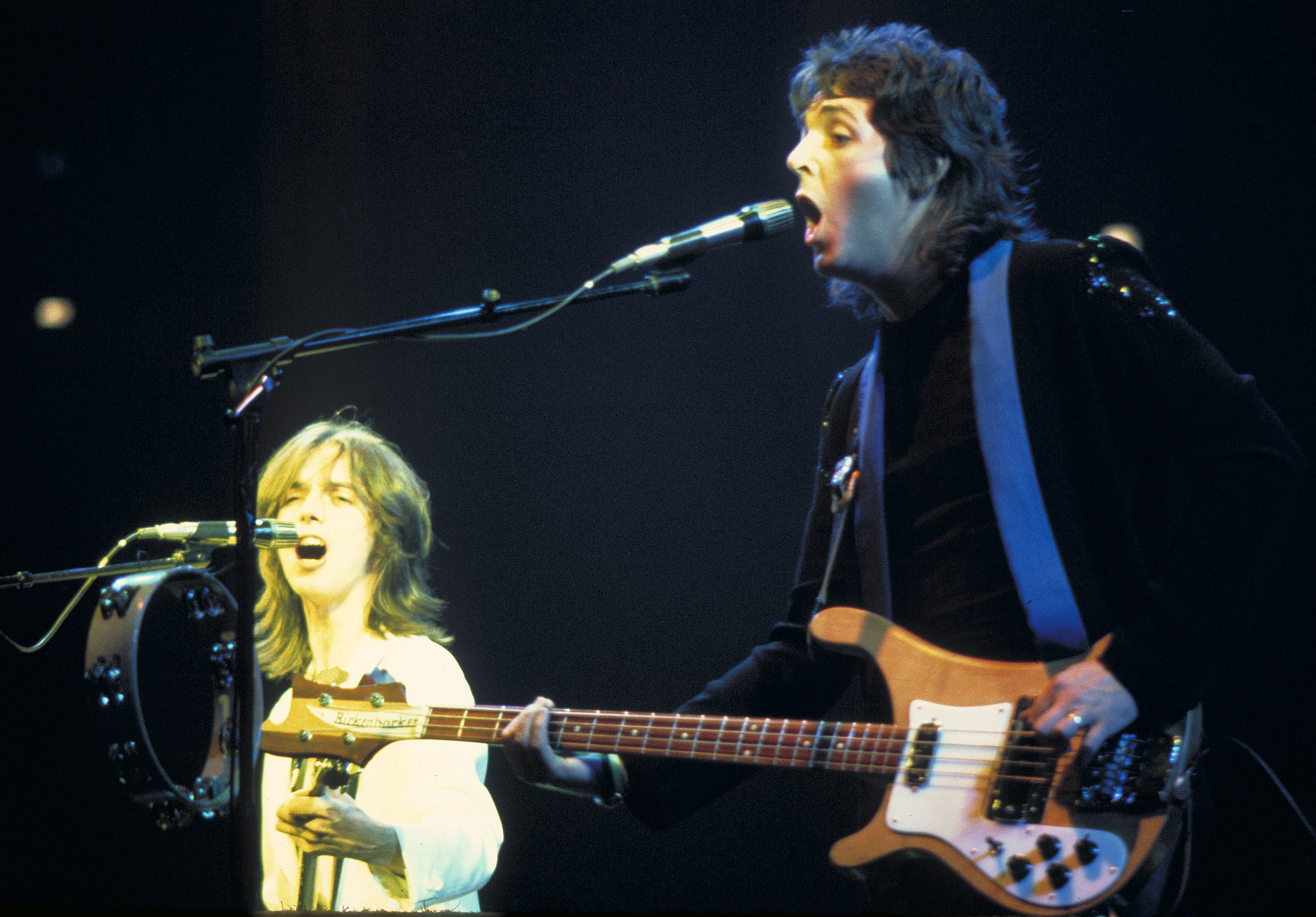
Jimmy McCulloch (left) and Paul McCartney (right) during the Wings Over the World tour in 1976.

The British–American rock band Wings was Paul McCartney's post-Beatles band who were active from 1971 to 1981. Their primary line-up was McCartney, his wife Linda and guitarist Denny Laine, formerly of the Moody Blues. Throughout their years as a band, they embarked on a number of concert tours, varying in scale from their initial "DIY" tour of British universities to the epic Wings Over the World tour.

Shortly after forming Wings, the McCartneys took the band on an impromptu tour of the United Kingdom's universities in early 1972, showing up unannounced and performing for whoever happened to be on campus. The band's intended first stop on the tour, Ashby-de-la-Zouch, refused to allow them to play, so the band moved on to the more receptive University of Nottingham. Admission to the first show was £0.50, proceeds being split up equally among the band members.

The last Concert for the People of Kampuchea on 29 December 1979, which was the final date of Wings' fifth tour, was Wings' final gig.

However, Wings achieved notoriety for its aborted sixth tour, a January 1980 tour of Japan, which was cancelled before it even started when Paul McCartney was arrested for possession of marijuana while entering Japan on 16 January 1980 and was eventually deported on 25 January after nine days in prison, without Wings ever performing. Wings never again attempted a tour prior to their breakup in 1981.

=== List of Wings tours ===
- Wings University Tour – 11 shows in the UK, 1972
- Wings Over Europe Tour – 26 shows throughout Europe, 1972
- Wings 1973 UK Tour – 21 shows in the UK, 1973
- Wings Over the World tour – 66 shows over the world, 1975–1976
- Wings UK Tour 1979 – 19 shows in the UK, 1979 + 1 show on 29 December 1979 (the last of the 4 Concerts for the People of Kampuchea)

== Solo ==
=== Solo tours ===
Title	Start date	End date	Shows	Gross Revenue
The Paul McCartney World Tour	26 September 1989	29 July 1990	103	
Unplugged Tour 1991	8 May 1991	24 July 1991	6	
The New World Tour	18 February 1993	16 December 1993	77	
Driving World Tour	1 April 2002	18 November 2002	58	$126,100,000
Back in the World tour	25 March 2003	1 June 2003	33	
'04 Summer Tour	25 May 2004	26 June 2004	14	
The 'US' Tour	17 September 2005	30 November 2005	37	$60,000,000
Secret Tour 2007	7 June 2007	25 October 2007	6	
Summer Live '09	11 July 2009	19 August 2009	10	$33,650,567
Good Evening Europe Tour	2 December 2009	22 December 2009	8	
Up and Coming Tour	28 March 2010	10 June 2011	42	
On the Run	15 July 2011	29 November 2012	37	
Out There	4 May 2013	22 October 2015	91	
One on One	13 April 2016	16 December 2017	77	$242,600,000
2018 Secret Gigs	9 June 2018	26 July 2018	5	$0
Freshen Up	17 September 2018	13 July 2019	39	
Got Back	28 April 2022	25 November 2025	79	

=== Solo unique shows ===
No.	Events	City	Country	Place	Capacity	Date	Songs
1.	Benefit for "Release"	London	England	Hard Rock Café		18 March 1973	
2.	Live Aid	London	England	Wembley Stadium	72,000	13 July 1985	1
3.	The Prince's Trust	London	England	Wembley Arena		20 June 1986	3
4.	Sanremo Music Festival	Sanremo	Italy	Teatro Ariston		28 February 1988	
5.	Up Close TV show	New York	United States	Ed Sullivan Theater		10 December 1992	20
6.	The New World Tour (rehearsals)	London	England	London Docklands		5 February 1993	22
7.	Benefit	London	England	Royal College of Music		25 March 1995	
8.	Ballad of the Skeletons	London	England	Royal Albert Hall		16 October 1995	
9.	TownHall Meeting	London	England	Bishopsgate Institute		17 May 1997	
10.	Music for Montserrat	London	England	Royal Albert Hall		15 September 1997	4
11.	Standing Stone	London	England	Royal Albert Hall		14 October 1997	
12.	Standing Stone	New York	United States	Carnegie Hall		19 November 1997	
13.	The Oprah Winfrey Show	New York	United States	Manhattan Center		20 November 1997	
14.	The Fireman Webcast	London	England	Abbey Road Studios		2 October 1998	
15.	Rock and Roll Hall of Fame	New York	United States	Waldorf Astoria		15 March 1999	
16.	Concert for Linda	London	England	Royal Albert Hall		10 April 1999	
17.	PETA Party of the Century	Hollywood	United States	Paramount Studios		18 September 1999	
18.	Working Classical	Liverpool	England	Philharmonic Hall		16 October 1999	
19.	Live at the Cavern Club	Liverpool	England	The Cavern		14 December 1999	
20.	The Concert for New York City	New York	United States	Madison Square Garden	20,000	October 2001	7
21.	Nobel Peace Prize Concert	Oslo	Norway	Oslo Spektrum	7,000	December 2001	3
22.	Super Bowl XXXVI	New Orleans	United States	Louisiana Superdome	72,922	February 2002	1
23.	74th Academy Awards	Hollywood	United States	Kodak Theatre	3,600	March 2002	1
24.	Party at the Palace	London	England	Buckingham Palace Garden	12,000	June 2002	6
25.	The Concert for George	London	England	Royal Albert Hall	6,000	November 2002	4
26.	Paul McCartney & James Taylor Together On Stage 2003 - Benefit Gala Concert	Los Angeles	United States	Beverly Hilton		23 September 2003	15 (7 from Paul or The Beatles)
27.	Super Bowl XXXIX	Jacksonville	United States	Jacksonville M.S.	78,125	February 2005	4
28.	Live 8	London	England	Hyde Park	200,000	June 2005	6
29.	Chaos and Creation in the Backyard	London	England	Abbey Road Studios	100	July 2005	12
30.	48th Annual Grammy Awards	Los Angeles	United States	Staples Center	20,000	February 2006	3
31.	Brit Awards	London	England	Earls Court	18,000	February 2008	5
32.	The Liverpool Sound	Liverpool	England	Anfield	40,000	1 June 2008	27
33.	Independence Concert (free show)	Kyiv	Ukraine	Maidan Nezalezhnosti (Independence Square)	350,000	14 June 2008	34
34.	The Last Play at Shea	New York	United States	Shea Stadium	55,000	July 2008	2
35.	Quebec 400th Anniversary	Quebec City	Canada	Plains of Abraham	270,000	20 July 2008	38
36.	Friendship First Concert	Tel Aviv	Israel	Yarkon Park	50,000	25 September 2008	32
37.	51st Annual Grammy Awards	Los Angeles	United States	Staples Center	20,000	February 2009	1
38.	Change Begins Within	New York	United States	Radio City Music Hall	7,000	April 2009	12
39.	Coachella Fest	Indio	United States	Coachella Valley	60,000	17 April 2009	36
40.	The Joint	Las Vegas	United States	Hard Rock	4,000	19 April 2009	34
41.	Late Show with David Letterman	New York	United States	The Ed Sullivan Theater marquee		15 July 2009	7
42.	Children in Need Rocks the Royal Albert Hall	London	England	Royal Albert Hall	6,000	12 November 2009	3
43.	The X Factor	London	England	Fountain Studios		13 December 2009	2
44.	54th Annual Grammy Awards	Los Angeles	United States	Staples Center	20,000	February 2012	4
45.	Diamond Jubilee Concert	London	England	Buckingham Palace		4 June 2012	5
46.	2012 Summer Olympics opening ceremony	London	England	Olympic Stadium		28 July 2012	2
47.	12-12-12: The Concert for Sandy Relief	New York	United States	Madison Square Garden		12 December 2012	8
48.	iHeartRadio Music Festival	Las Vegas	United States	MGM Grand Garden Arena		21 September 2013	8
49.	Hollywood Boulevard/Jimmy Kimmel Live!	Hollywood	United States	El Capitan Outdoor Stage		23 September 2013	15
50.	35th PETA Gala Awards	Hollywood	United States	Hollywood Palladium		30 September 2015	
51.	Carpool Karaoke /The Late Late Show with James Corden	Liverpool	United Kingdom	Philharmonic Dining Rooms		June 9, 2018	13
52-54.	Surprise show	Manhattan	United States	The Bowery Ballroom		11, 12, and 14 February 2025	22

== See also ==
- List of highest-grossing live music artists
