= Wings 1971–73 =

Box set by Paul McCartney & Wings
- Released: 7 December 2018
- Genre: Rock
- Length: 382:11 (CDs)
- Label: Capitol
- Producer: Paul McCartney

Paul McCartney & Wings chronology
Back to the Egg (1979)	Wings 1971–73 (2018)	One Hand Clapping (2024)

Paul McCartney chronology
Egypt Station (2018)	Wings 1971–73 (2018)	Amoeba Gig (2019)

Professional ratings
Review scores
Source	Rating
Record Collector	4/5 stars

Wings 1971–73 is a box set released by Paul McCartney as part of the Paul McCartney Archive Collection on 7 December 2018.

== Contents ==
The box set contains deluxe versions of the archive collection reissues of the Wings albums Wild Life and Red Rose Speedway and the new live album Wings Over Europe, covering the Wings Over Europe Tour; the latter is exclusive to the box set. Additional exclusive content to the box set are a Wings Over Europe 96-page photo book and facsimile 1972 tour programme.

== Release ==
Wings 1971–73 was released in limited quantities simultaneously with reissues of Wild Life and Red Rose Speedway.

== Contents ==
Album	Contents
Wild Life	3CD + DVD
Red Rose Speedway	3CD + 2 DVD + Blu-ray
Wings Over Europe	CD

== Wings Over Europe ==
=== Overview ===
The album consist of the tracks from Wings Over Europe Tour 1972 aside from one track - "Big Barn Bed" which was not performed during that tour and is taken from Wings 1973 UK Tour.

Three tracks from the album are available on other releases:

- "The Mess" (Live at the Hague) was released as a B-side to "My Love" single in 1973 and was later available on various re-releases of Red Rose Speedway.
- "Best Friend" (Live in Antwerp) was released as a bonus track to the Red Rose Speedway 2018 reissue and reconstructed double LP.
- "1882" (Live in Berlin) was released as a bonus track to the Red Rose Speedway 2018 reissue.

=== Track listing ===
All tracks are written by Paul McCartney and Linda McCartney, except where noted.

Wings Over Europe
No.	Title	Writer(s)	Recording date and place	Length
1.	"Big Barn Bed"		10 July 1973, Newcastle	3:45
2.	"Eat at Home"		21 August 1972, The Hague	3:45
3.	"Smile Away"	Paul McCartney	24 August 1972, Berlin	4:05
4.	"Bip Bop"		21 August 1972, The Hague	2:25
5.	"Mumbo"		22 August 1972, Antwerp	3:32
6.	"Blue Moon of Kentucky"	Bill Monroe	21 August 1972, The Hague	3:05
7.	"1882"		24 August 1972, Berlin	6:23
8.	"I Would Only Smile"	Denny Laine	22 August 1972, Antwerp	3:16
9.	"Give Ireland Back to the Irish"		19 August 1972, Groningen	3:58
10.	"The Mess"		24 August 1972, Berlin	4:07
11.	"Best Friend"		22 August 1972, Antwerp	3:56
12.	"Soily"		24 August 1972, Berlin	4:38
13.	"I Am Your Singer"		21 August 1972, The Hague	2:33
14.	"Seaside Woman"	Linda McCartney	19 August 1972, Groningen	3:36
15.	"Wild Life"		21 August 1972, The Hague	5:00
16.	"My Love"		21 August 1972, The Hague	3:57
17.	"Mary Had a Little Lamb"		21 August 1972, The Hague	2:38
18.	"Maybe I'm Amazed"	Paul McCartney	19 August 1972, Groningen	3:22
19.	"Hi, Hi, Hi"		21 August 1972, The Hague	4:10
20.	"Long Tall Sally"	Richard Penniman; Enotris Johnson; Robert Blackwell	19 August 1972, Groningen	1:33
