= Cold Cuts (Paul McCartney album) =

Compilation album by Paul McCartney and Wings
- Released: Unreleased
- Recorded: 1970–1987
- Studio: Various
- Genre: Rock
- Producer: Paul McCartney

Cold Cuts (also known as part of Hot Hitz/Kold Kutz) is an unreleased album of outtakes by Paul McCartney and Wings.

The first iteration of the album was planned to be released in 1975 and the project was revisited several times over the years, changing the tracklist and adding overdubs to the tracks, until it was abandoned permanently in the late 1980s. Most of the songs considered for the album were recorded with Wings, but a few of McCartney's solo tracks were also considered.

== History ==
=== Early concept ===
The album was originally conceived as a budget release in 1975, composed of non-album singles and previously unreleased tracks. During Wings' recording sessions in Nashville, Tennessee in July 1974 several new songs were recorded and some previously unused tracks were overdubbed for a potential compilation album, variously referred to as Cold Cuts or Hot Hitz and Kold Kutz. The album was slated for release in March 1975 but never materialized. There is no information about the track selection for the album during this period. Songs recorded or overdubbed during the Nashville sessions in July 1974 but eventually shelved include: "Send Me The Heart", "Hey Diddle" and "Wide Prairie".

=== Hot Hitz/Kold Kutz double LP ===
McCartney returned to the project in 1978 and presented it to EMI/Capitol in October 1978 as a hits and rarities compilation to be titled Hot Hitz/Kold Kutz. The label was not convinced and the compilation was repackaged as Wings Greatest and released in November 1978. The Kold Kutz disc would be leaked in 1988 as bootleg LP titled Cold Cuts (Another Early Version).

=== Cold Cuts single LP ===
McCartney returned to the project in late 1979 to make new track lists and this time it was to be a standalone album retitled Cold Cuts. No further work was done until additional overdubs were added to the tracks "A Love for You", "Waterspout", "My Carnival" and "Same Time Next Year" in January 1981.

The new version of Cold Cuts removed the Linda McCartney and Denny Laine vocal tracks and instrumentals and added newly recorded tracks during London Town and Back to the Egg sessions instead in order to create a more commercial offering. The album was planned to be released in early 1981, however Columbia Records, McCartney's then new label, was not interested in releasing an album of outtakes and it was shelved. It was also believed that its release soon after the murder of John Lennon would seem inappropriate. This version of the album was also bootlegged.

The project was rebooted again in late 1986 with arranger-producer Richard Niles. "My Carnival" was excluded as it was released the previous year as b-side and new tracks from Paul McCartney's solo recordings were considered for the tracklisting, including "Blue Sway" from the McCartney II sessions for which a large string section by Nilesand was added. "A Love for You" also received further overdubs. In 1987, this version of the album leaked onto the bootleg market as an LP titled Cold Cuts (Club Sandwich SP-11)

The final sessions that attempted an official release of Cold Cuts was in August 1987. McCartney mixed and edited another version of the album with producer Chris Thomas and engineer Bill Price. Additional work was done to "Mama's Little Girl" and "Same Time Next Year". According to an interview with McCartney, this version was to feature album art by Saul Steinberg.

=== Cancellation ===
In 1987 McCartney's new manager, Richard Odgen, recommended that, at this point in McCartney's career, releasing a best-of compilation would be a better idea, so Cold Cuts was scrapped in place of All the Best! that was released in November 1987. Previously unreleased track "Waterspout" was initially planned to be released on that album but was pulled at the last minute.

After bootleg versions of "Cold Cuts" appeared on the market, McCartney abandoned the project permanently.

== Possible tracks considered for the album ==
Below is a list of the possible tracks that were under consideration over the lifetime of the project. All of the unreleased songs have appeared on various bootlegs.

Song	Origins	Release(s)
"A Love for You"	Recorded in 1970 during the Ram sessions, the track received additional overdubs by Laurence Juber and Steve Holley from Wings' third line-up in 1981.	A version of the song was released in 2003 on The In-Laws soundtrack album. Another mix of the song dating back to 1986 was released on the 2012 reissue of Ram.
"Best Friend"	Recorded live during the 1972 Wings Over Europe Tour. It was originally intended to be released on the double album version of Red Rose Speedway.	Released on the 2018 reissue of Red Rose Speedway and the 2018 live album Wings Over Europe.
"Blue Sway"	Recorded in 1979 during the McCartney II sessions. The track received additional overdubs by producer/arranger Richard Niles in 1986.	Both versions, with and without overdubs, were released on the 2011 reissue of McCartney II.
"Cage"	Recorded in 1978 and planned for Back to the Egg, but it removed from the album at the last minute in favour of "Baby's Request". This song features the chords C-A-G-E as its riff, to go along with the lyrics.	Unreleased
"Did We Meet Somewhere Before?"	Recorded in 1978 during the sessions for Back to the Egg. The track was intended as the main theme for Warren Beatty's film Heaven Can Wait but got rejected. A snippet of the track was used in the film Rock 'n' Roll High School although it did not appear on the soundtrack album nor in the screen credits.	Unreleased
"Hey Diddle"	Recorded in 1970 during the Ram sessions as a Paul and Linda duet. Later, the track received further overdubs when Wings were in Nashville in 1974.	The first official release of the song was a snippet of home demo performance from 1971 with "Bip Bop" on the Wingspan: Hits and History compilation. The original 1971 studio version was released in 2012 on the Special Edition reissue of Ram. The Nashville version was released on the 2014 reissue of Venus and Mars. A complete home demo version was released on the 2018 reissue of Wild Life.
"I Would Only Smile"	Written by Denny Laine and recorded in 1972 during the Red Rose Speedway sessions, it was intended to be released on the double album version of Red Rose Speedway.	Released on Denny Laine's album Japanese Tears in 1980. An alternative mix was released on the 2018 reissue of Red Rose Speedway.
"Lunch Box/Odd Sox"	Recorded in 1975 during the Venus and Mars sessions.	Released as the B-side of "Coming Up" in 1980.
"Mama's Little Girl"	Recorded in 1972 during the Red Rose Speedway sessions. It was intended to be on the double album version of Red Rose Speedway.	Released as the B-side of "Put It There" in 1990. Included on the 1993 reissue of Wild Life and on the 2018 reissue of Red Rose Speedway.
"My Carnival"	Recorded during the Venus and Mars sessions in New Orleans in 1975.	Released as the B-side of "Spies Like Us" in 1985. Included on the 2014 reissue of Venus and Mars
"Night Out"	Recorded in 1972 during the Red Rose Speedway sessions. It was overdubbed multiple times by different incarnations of Wings. It was intended to be released on the double album version of Red Rose Speedway.	A primarily instrumental version dating from 1972 was released on the 2018 reissue of Red Rose Speedway.
"Oriental Nightfish"	Written by Linda McCartney and recorded with Wings in 1973.	Released on Linda McCartney's album Wide Prairie in 1998.
"Proud Mum/Proud Mum (Reprise)"	Two instrumental tracks recorded in 1974 during the Venus and Mars sessions, under the name "The Whippets". The songs were meant to be in a commercial for Mother's Pride bread, but they were never used.	Unreleased
"Robber's Ball"	Recorded in 1978 during the Back to the Egg sessions.	Unreleased
"Same Time Next Year"	Recorded in 1978 for the film Same Time, Next Year, but it was rejected because too much of the plot was given away in the lyrics.	Released as the B-side of "Put It There" in 1990.
"Seaside Woman"	Written by Linda McCartney and recorded in 1972 during the Red Rose Speedway sessions. It was intended to be released on the double album version of Red Rose Speedway.	Released as a single in 1977 under the name Suzy and the Red Stripes. Included on Linda McCartney's album Wide Prairie in 1998. An alternative mix was released on the 2018 reissue of Red Rose Speedway.
"Send Me the Heart"	Written by Laine and McCartney, recorded by Wings during the Nashville sessions in 1974. After the recording of "Sally G" Paul challenged Denny Laine to write a country song too.	Released on Laine's album Japanese Tears in 1980.
"Thank You Darling"	Recorded in 1972 during the Red Rose Speedway sessions. It was intended to be on the double album version of Red Rose Speedway.	Released on the Red Rose Speedway 2018 reissue.
"Tomorrow"	An instrumental remake of the song from the album Wild Life. Recorded in 1974 during the Venus and Mars sessions, under the name "The Whippets".	Unreleased
"Tragedy"	A cover of Thomas Wayne's 1959 ballad. It was recorded in 1972 during the Red Rose Speedway sessions. It was intended to be released on the double album version of Red Rose Speedway.	Released in 2018 on the deluxe reissue of Red Rose Speedway.
"Twice in a Lifetime"	Recorded in 1985, it was the theme from the film Twice in a Lifetime.	Released as a bonus track on the 1993 reissue of Pipes of Peace.
"Waterspout"	Recorded in 1977 during the London Town sessions, with additional overdubs done in 1987. Planned to be added to All the Best! but was ultimately scrapped in favour of "C Moon".	Unreleased
"Wide Prairie"	Written by Linda McCartney and recorded in 1973, with overdubs done in Nashville in 1974.	An edited version, omitting two sections with lead vocals by Paul, was released on Linda McCartney's album Wide Prairie in 1998.

== Track listings ==
To date, an official track listing has never been announced. However, various bootlegs of the different versions have appeared on the market. These bootleg versions show the Cold Cuts project in its various stages of mixing and different overdubs on the recordings over the years.

=== Hot Hitz/Kold Kutz – 1978 version ===
Side one:

1. "Another Day"
2. "Silly Love Songs"
3. "Live And Let Die"
4. "Junior's Farm"
5. "With A Little Luck"
6. "Band on the Run"

Side two:

1. "Uncle Albert / Admiral Halsey"
2. "Hi, Hi, Hi"
3. "Let 'Em In"
4. "My Love"
5. "Jet"
6. "Mull of Kintyre"

Side three:

1. "Mama's Little Girl"
2. "I Would Only Smile"
3. "Tragedy"
4. "Night Out"
5. "Oriental Nightfish"
6. "Lunch Box/Odd Sox"
7. "My Carnival"
8. "Send Me the Heart"
9. "Hey Diddle"

Side four:

1. "Wide Prairie"
2. "Tomorrow" (1974 instrumental version)
3. "Proud Mum"
4. "Proud Mum (reprise)"
5. "Same Time Next Year"
6. "Did We Meet Somewhere Before?"

=== Cold Cuts – 1981 version ===
Side one:

1. "A Love for You"
2. "My Carnival"
3. "Waterspout"
4. "Mamma's Little Girl"
5. "Night Out"
6. "Robbers Ball"

Side two:

1. "Cage"
2. "Did We Meet Somewhere Before?"
3. "Hey Diddle"
4. "Tragedy"
5. "Best Friend"
6. "Same Time Next Year"

=== Cold Cuts – 1987 version ===
Side one:

1. "Blue Sway"
2. "Hey Diddle"
3. "Mama's Little Girl"
4. "Twice In A Lifetime"
5. "Waterspout"
6. "A Love For You"
7. "Did We Meet Somewhere Before?"

Side two:

1. "Same Time Next Year"
2. "Best Friend"
3. "Cage"
4. "Tragedy"
5. "Thank You Darling"
6. "Night Out"
7. "Robber's Ball"
