= Cold Cuts =

Cold Cuts may refer to:

- Cold cuts, precooked or cured meat
- Cold Cuts (Paul McCartney album)
- Cold Cuts (Show of Hands album), 2002
- "Cold Cuts" (Doctors), a 2003 television episode
- "Cold Cuts" (The Sopranos), a 2004 television episode
- Coldcut, an English electronic music duo
