= The Mess (song) =

1973 single by Paul McCartney and Wings

Single by Paul McCartney and Wings
- A-side: "My Love"
- Released: 23 March 1973
- Recorded: 21 August 1972
- Venue: Congresgebouw, the Hague, Netherlands
- Genre: Rock
- Length: 4:55
- Label: Apple
- Songwriters: Paul McCartney, Linda McCartney
- Producer: Paul McCartney

"The Mess" is a song written by Paul and Linda McCartney that was first released in a live version in 1973 as the B-side of the Wings' number-one single "My Love". It had been considered for inclusion on the Wings' 1973 album Red Rose Speedway but was ultimately left off. It was subsequently included on rereleases of Red Rose Speedway. Its original title was "The Mess I'm In".

== Description ==
Paul McCartney's personal assistant described "The Mess" as "nothing if not rock 'n' roll." Beatles FAQ author Robert Rodriguez described "The Mess" as "an uncharacteristic piece of boogie" and compared the refrain to that of the Band's song "The Shape I'm In". Beatle biographer John Blaney described "The Mess" as a "fine example" of "heads-down-no-nonsense rock'n'roll." NME writers Roy Carr and Tony Tyler described it as a "straight rock 'n' roll" song and "a powerful stomper" that "features an intriguing echo delay, clean production and slightly lackluster drumming from Denny Seiwell." Beatle expert Bruce Spizer described it as "an effective guitar-driven rocker, with tempo changes and heavy reverb on the vocals. Music journalist Andrew Wild described it as "an up-tempo crowd-pleaser." Robin Denselow of The Guardian wrote in 1972 that it "had echoes of The Who in parts, with changes in pace and harmony."

== Writing and recording ==
"The Mess" was developed out of a jam session during a Wings rehearsal on 20 January 1972. Henry McCullough participated in the rehearsal and jam even though he had not yet officially joined Wings. Originally the song was titled "The Mess I'm In".

Wings attempted to record a studio version of "The Mess" on 8 March 1972 at Olympic Studios in London but this version did not have the energy that the live jam version had, despite Paul McCartney's attempts at adjusting the arrangement. According to McCartney biographers Allan Kozinn and Adrian Sinclair "what was once a vehicle for McCullough's dazzling guitar skills now lacked guts." That version was mixed in December 1972 but ultimately not used.

The officially released version of "The Mess" was recorded live at the Congresgebouw in the Hague, Netherlands on 21 August 1972. Paul McCartney played bass guitar and sang the lead vocals, Linda McCartney played keyboards and sang backup vocals, Denny Laine and McCullough played electric guitar and Seiwell played drums. The live performance was edited, overdubbed and remixed for commercial release.

The performance of the officially released version was also filmed. The film was used in a McCartney TV special that was aired a week after the single release. There is also a film of a rehearsal of the song from late January 1972 that has not been publicly released.

== Release ==
"The Mess" was intended to be included on Red Rose Speedway when that album was contemplated as a double album. It was included on sets of acetates prepared for various versions of the double album in 1972. However, it was ultimately left off the album when the decision was made to release it as a single disc album. It was released as the B-side of the My Love" single and was included on the eventual compact disc version of Red Rose Speedway.

The television special James Paul McCartney used a different live performance of "The Mess" recorded in West Berlin. However, since the guitar solo from the Amsterdam performance was deemed superior, that solo was edited into the West Berlin performance. The Berlin version was included on Wings Over Europe.

== Reception ==
Denselow regarded "The Mess" as being a "welcome contrast to the nursery rhymes" Paul had been writing during that timeframe. Rodriguez felt that "The Mess" "worked well enough" as a performance piece and showed of "some superb lead [guitar] work from Henry [McCullough], ensemble harmonies and some unison riffing from the guitarists and Linda", but "didn't rise to the level of a memorable composition", especially from someone like Paul McCartney.

News Journal Jef Kwit felt that the portion of James Paul McCartney that contained "The Mess" was the high point of the show.

== Live performances ==
"The Mess" was in the Wings' regular setlist during the Wings University Tour and Wings Over Europe Tour in 1972, as well as the Wings 1973 UK Tour.

== Personnel ==
According to The Paul Mccartney Project:

- Paul McCartney – lead vocals, bass
- Linda McCartney – backing vocals, keyboards
- Denny Laine – backing vocals, electric guitar
- Henry McCullough – backing vocals, electric guitar
- Denny Seiwell – drums
