= 1972 Wings Tour Bus =

Bristol double-decker bus

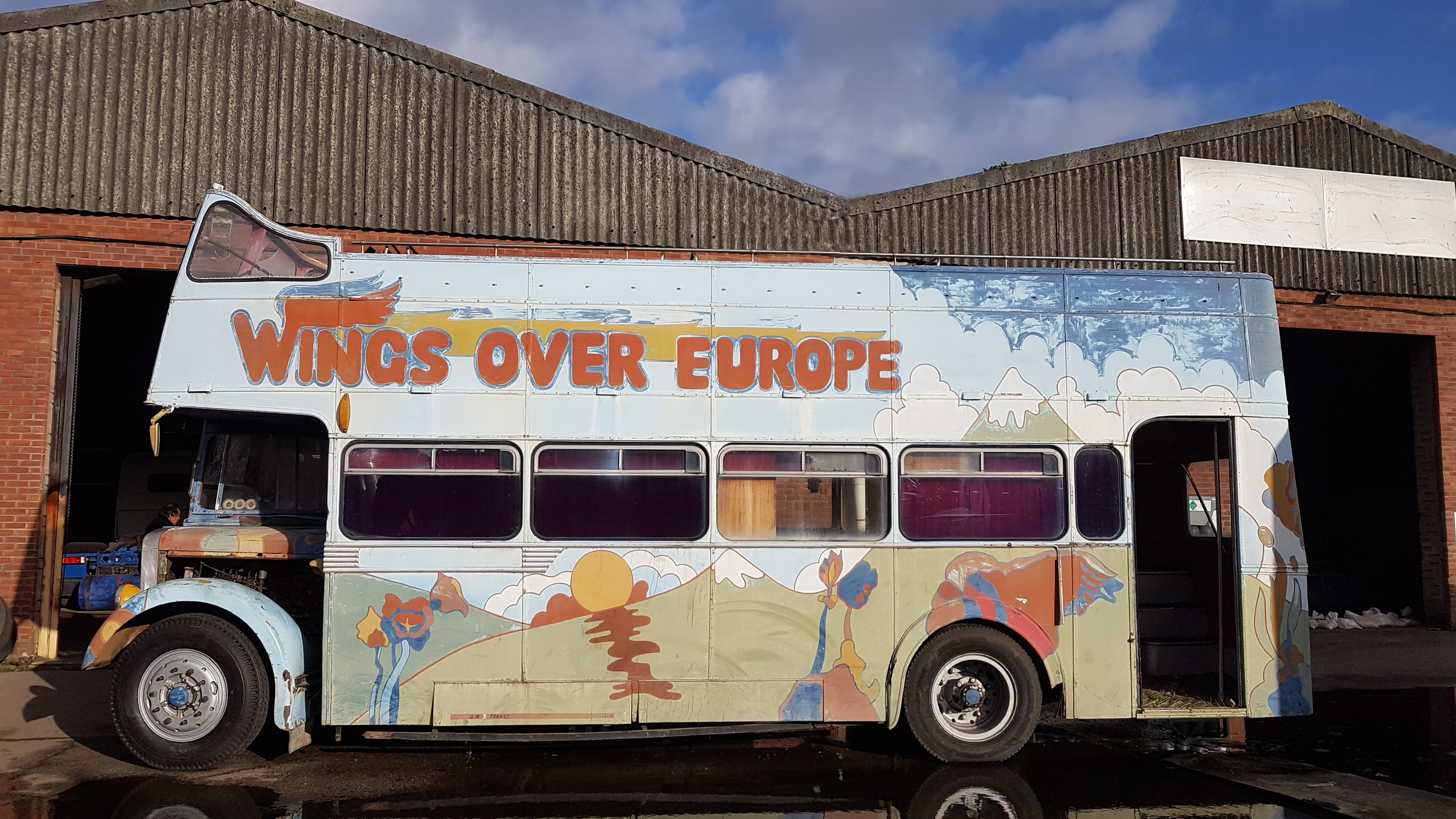
- The tour bus under restoration in 2019

Overview
- Type: double-decker bus
- Manufacturer: Bristol Commercial Vehicles (rolling chassis); Eastern Coach Works (coachwork)
- Also called: WNO 481
- Production: 1953

The 1972 Wings Tour Bus or WNO 481 is a Bristol double-decker bus built in 1953. Originally used in Essex and Norfolk, it was painted in psychedelic colours and was used by Paul McCartney's band Wings during their 1972 Wings Over Europe Tour in place of a conventional bus. After returning to service and changing owner a number of times, it was subsequently repainted as it was during the tour and put on display outside a rock café in Tenerife in the mid-late 1990s, ending up in a garden for many years before being transported back to the UK in 2017 for restoration and sale.

== Service use ==
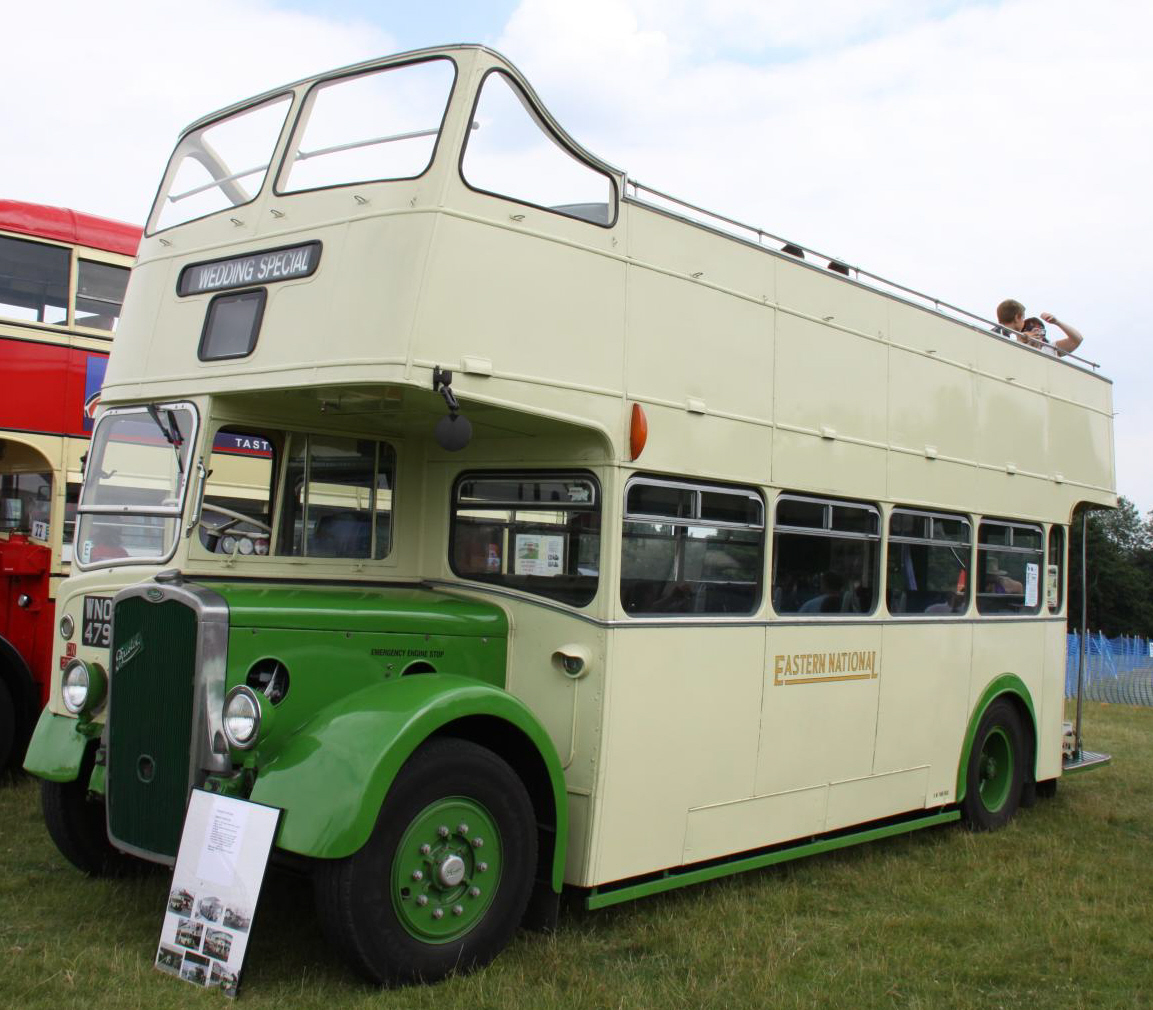
WNO 479, an identical bus painted as WNO 481 would have looked similar to this in 1966

The double-decker bus has a Bristol Commercial Vehicles KSW5G chassis, with a body from Eastern Coach Works. It was built in 1953, originally had a closed upper deck and DVLA records show that it was first registered with Essex County Council in Chelmsford in November 1953. It was first used in Essex in the 1950s–60s for local bus routes.

The bus entered service with Eastern National Omnibus Company in Chelmsford, and was painted plain green. In 1966 it was converted into an open top bus, and was repainted cream with a green trim. In this form it was primarily used by Eastern National for regular service routes in seaside areas during the summer months.

The bus was sold to Eastern Counties Omnibus Company in 1968, with the green replaced by a maroon red. The bus was utilised on the 248 route serving Felixstowe town and port in the summer and was mothballed at Great Yarmouth during the winter, although it was also available for hire, as it was with Eastern National. It was sold to a local dealer in Norfolk in July 1971 and was then bought in December by Halls Coaches, painted red and grey, and used under the brand "Valliant Silverline" up until June 1972.

== Wings Tour bus ==
Rather than using a normal tour bus for the 1972 Wings Over Europe Tour, McCartney hired the bus and had it painted in psychedelic colours, with the tour name shown in a blue sky over snow-capped mountains, the band's logo above the windscreen, and with the band members names stencilled on the back. The order was: Paul & Linda McCartney; Denny Laine; Henry McCullough; and Denny Seiwell. It was a similar idea to the Beatles' Magical Mystery Tour and Cliff Richard's Summer Holiday from the 1960s.

In a video recalling the occasion, Tom Salter, of the Gear shop on Carnaby Street, who promoted the 1972 tour, stated that McCartney had asked for a double-decker bus, but Salter's business partner and fellow tour promoter, John Morris, wanted Salter to talk him out of it. Salter instead thought it was a "fantastic idea" and painted it "like Magical Mystery Tour", and that he had "gone one farther" by getting an open-top bus, describing the layout of the bus that he had arranged, as a "hippy-heaven come Yellow Submarine type feel".

The seats on the top deck were removed, with mattresses and bean bags for the band and their families to lounge and sleep on (although the band stayed in hotels during the tour), and was also used as a playpen for their children while on the move. The downstairs was carpeted, with four original seats at the front, bunk beds for the kids, a fully-functioning kitchen in the rear and there was a stereo. The McCartneys also had a double bed in the bus, which they tried to take into various hotels during the tour.

The Wings logo first appeared on the rear of the bus and was made of wood. It was designed by Neil Dean, who did the work through Tom Salter, who had been asked to arrange the hire by Paul McCartney. The "Wings Over Europe" paint work and other renovations were performed by Salter, Dean, Geoffrey Cleghorn and Charlie Smith, with some assistance from Dean's wife, along with one or two (unnamed) others who performed other specialist work, such as the rolling destination blind with the tour destinations.

Contrary to some recollections and beliefs, the paint work and renovations were applied at the Halls/Silverline depot in Cowley Road, Uxbridge, where the bus was stationed at the time by its owners, and was leased, not owned, by McCartney. The vehicle was noted in the Wings Over Europe tour programme as being provided by "Silverline Tours" (a trading name of Halls Coaches) and was returned to the owners after the tour.

"Quite a mad thing to do, to put a playpen on the top deck of the bus and put all the children in there. It's not what you'd expect from a normal band. But we weren't a normal band."

—Paul McCartney, decades later

McCartney wanted to have a good time during the tour, noting as the tour began that "We never had time to do that in the Beatle days." In particular, he liked the idea of being out in the sun while traveling rather than stuck inside a vehicle in the heat of July and August.

The bus visited 25 cities in 9 countries, for 25 concerts in July and August 1972, covering 7,500 miles (12,100 km). The concert locations were printed and displayed in the bus's rolling destination indicator. The bus had a top speed of 38 miles per hour (61 km/h), making it, in the view of author Howard Sounes, "no doubt huge fun ... [but] a slow and inefficient way to navigate the continent." Wings member Seiwell later recalled cars zipping by them on European motorways and said of the bus, "It was quite nice, but it didn't make a lot of sense." The bus travelled in convoy with a crew tour bus. Whenever it looked like the buses would not arrive at the venue on time for a concert, a convoy of other vehicles would be sent from the venue to collect them.

During the tour, the band and their family members stayed in luxury hotels rather than in the bus (with hotel extras costing the band most of their wages during the tour). Most of the adults on the bus also smoked cannabis, but rather than storing the drugs on the bus and risking taking them through customs they were regularly posted from England, which caused problems during the tour as the Swedish police discovered the scheme. This prevented the tour from going on to the US and Japan, and it concluded in Berlin on 24 August 1972.

== Later history ==
The bus was returned to Halls/Silverline. Halls Coaches and all associated businesses were bought by Tricentrol around August 1973 and the bus was painted mustard gold and moved to Dunstable. The bus continued to be used largely for special event hire, particularly at the Epsom Derby, as well as events such as those celebrating the 1977 Queen's Silver Jubilee. The bus was recorded as being "out of service" with Tricentrol in 1980.

It was scheduled to be scrapped in 1982, when Roger White from St Albans purchased it for £3,000. He is believed to have repainted it as it had been during the Wings tour shortly thereafter.

In 1989 the bus was painted red and white and was used in the BAFTA Great British London-Cannes Film Rally, the Southend Bus Rally, as well as the 1990 BAFTA Great British Rally, Cardiff-London-Edinburgh, where it was photographed behind Princess Anne. It was repainted with the Wings livery again for a Beatles Amsterdam Convention in April 1993.

In July 1993, the bus was put up for auction by Sotheby's. Its value was estimated as £25,000–£30,000. However, the family of Roger White and Sotheby's themselves advised in private correspondence that the bus failed to sell at auction and was instead sold shortly thereafter in a private and undisclosed transaction.

The man who purchased the bus from Roger White was John "Goldfinger" Palmer.

The bus was next displayed outside of a rock café venue, in Tenerife, known to be owned by Palmer. It was later moved to the café owner's garden in La Caldera del Rey, Adeje, where it was left to decay. It was spotted there by Justin James c 2009, who bought it even though at the time he did not know what he would do with it. Moving the bus to Oxfordshire in the UK took eight years, partly due to the difficulty in removing it from the garden, which required the use of cranes. In October 2017 it was loaded onto the Monte Alegre for transport from Algeciras to Felixstowe.

In 2017, McCartney tweeted to say that he had heard it was back in the UK, and to ask its whereabouts. A reply from James confirmed that it was in Oxfordshire.

In 2019, the bus was put up for auction in Merseyside by Omega Auctions, as part of a Beatles-themed auction, with an estimated selling price of £15,000–£25,000. James's plans to use it for musical children's tours did not work out, and he was emigrating to Australia. He estimated that he had spent around £25,000 on the bus at that point, and said that any profit would go to the charity he was a trustee of, Arms Around the Child. The bus was auctioned with the owner's paperwork, but without a MOT. However, no bids were received and the bus went unsold.

The Wings 1972 Tour Bus after its restoration 2022

The bus was subsequently bought by Tom Jennings who set up the 1972 Wings Tour Bus Supporters Club, who fundraised for its restoration. The bus was initially passed to David Hoare of Chepstow Classic Motors to work on before being completed by Bradley Earl of Simon Morris Thorpe Ltd of Thorpe-le-Soken in Essex.

The restoration was completed in November 2022 and the bus went on exhibition at The Classic Motor Show at The NEC. In October 2023, it was announced that the bus would be put up for auction online by Julien's Auctions, on 16 November 2023, with a valuation of $200,000–$300,000, however the bus was not put up for auction on the day, apparently due to not meeting the $200,000 reserve price. The owner subsequently placed a classified ad for the bus on eBay. After initially asking £175,000, the price was reduced to £125,000 to accommodate a potential buyer who wished to part exchange a 2015 Aston Martin, at the time worth about £50,000.

In April 2024, the bus was again put up for auction this time by Car And Classic Ltd with an expected sale price of £200,000 and sold on 29 April for £186,000.

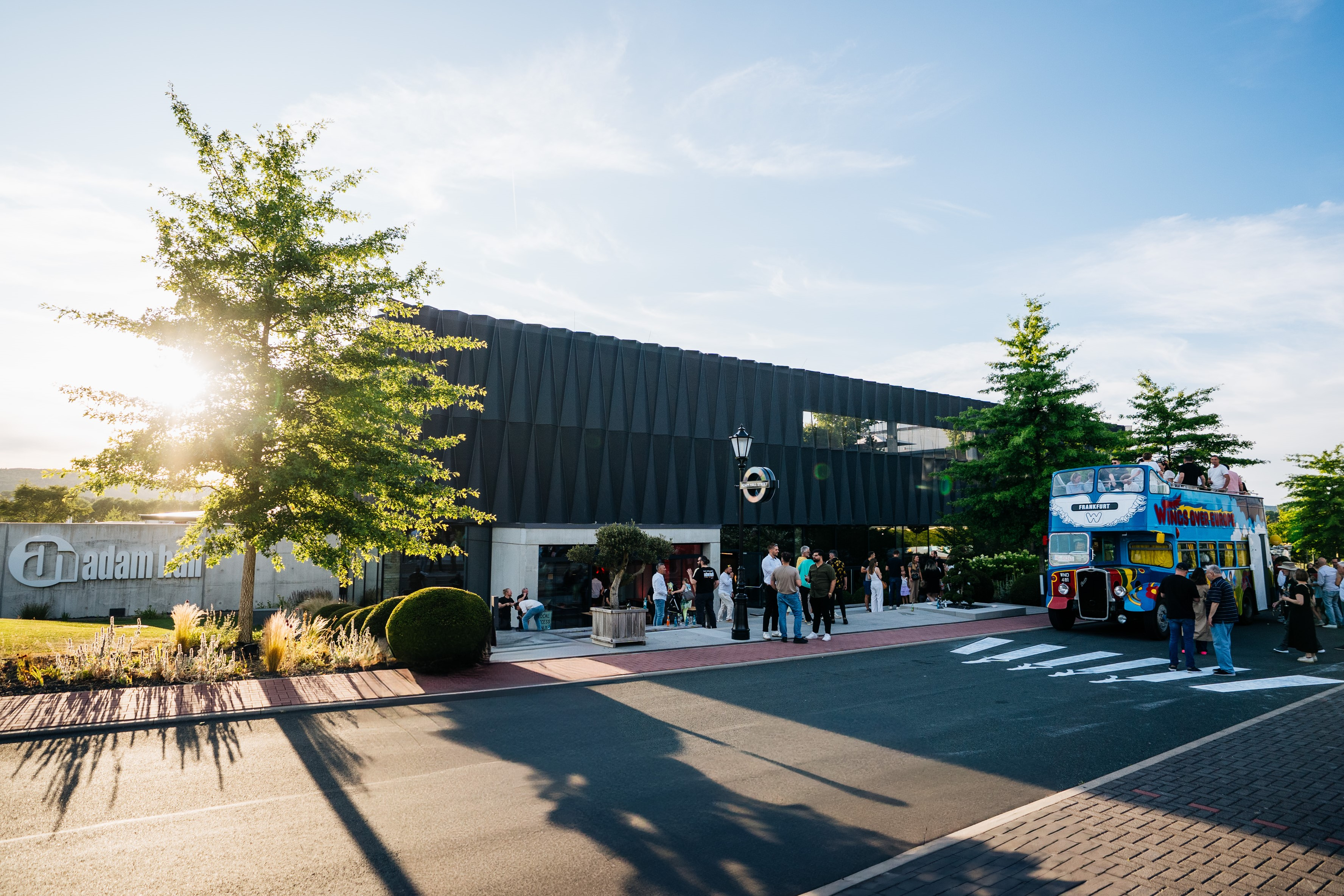
The Wings tour bus at Adam Hall Group HQ in Germany in 2025.

In April 2024, the German event technology company Adam Hall Group acquired the iconic Wings tour bus for its Rock ’n’ Roll Library, a curated collection celebrating live music heritage. The fully restored Bristol double-decker was officially unveiled to the public in July 2025 during the company’s 50th anniversary celebrations. Now on permanent display at Adam Hall’s headquarters near Frankfurt, the bus is intended as a cultural symbol and will be used in exhibitions, educational initiatives, and collaborations with artists and institutions worldwide.

== See also ==
- Customised buses
