= Wings Over Europe Tour =

1972 concert tour by Wings

- Tour by Wings
- Poster to the concert in Antwerp, Belgium
- Location: Europe
- Associated album: "Give Ireland Back to the Irish" and "Mary Had a Little Lamb" singles
- Start date: 9 July 1972
- End date: 24 August 1972
- Legs: 1
- No. of shows: 25

Wings concert chronology
- Wings University Tour (1972); Wings Over Europe Tour (1972); Wings 1973 UK Tour (1973)

Wings Over Europe was the name of a concert series by British band Wings. In the summer of 1972, the band set out on a concert tour of Europe, in a double decker bus, WNO 481.

== Promotion ==
Coming on the heels of a tour of English universities, the Wings Over Europe Tour was intended to promote recent singles "Give Ireland Back to the Irish" and "Mary Had a Little Lamb", as well as provide live recordings to be included on a future album. The second objective did not come to fruition for a long time, the album Red Rose Speedway was released in Spring of the next year without any of the concert material. Only the 21 August performance of "The Mess" at The Hague was officially released, as a B-side to the single "My Love".

The live version of new song "Best Friend" was intended to be released as part of Cold Cuts compilation album, but the album was abandoned permanently.

In 2012 a live track consisting of "Eat at Home" and "Smile Away" recorded in Groningen was released as an iTunes exclusive to the reissue of Paul and Linda McCartney's Ram.

Finally in 2018, a newly compiled live album Wings Over Europe was released in the limited edition boxset Wings 1971–73 in the Paul McCartney Archive Collection., while "Best Friend" and "1882" were also released as part of the Red Rose Speedway reissue. In addition, the deluxe edition of Red Rose Speedway included a DVD of The Bruce McMouse Show, a concert film shot in Germany and The Netherlands interspersed with animation of a family of mice that live below the stage. It was intended to promote the album, but the animation took several years longer than expected and by the time it was finished, the group had moved on.

== Touring ==
The band, with the McCartney children and their road crew, loaded up in a brightly coloured double decker bus for the tour of the continent. The tour proceeded largely without incident, but on 10 August in Gothenburg, Sweden, Paul and Linda McCartney were fined US$1,200 for possession of marijuana. Paul joked that the incident would "make good publicity" for the tour, in comments reported around the world at the time (e.g. Miami Herald, 12 August 1972). The Daily Telegraph (12 August 1972) quoted "a member of the group" as saying that this was an "excellent advertisement. ... Our name flies now all over the world".

Wings' line up for the tour was Paul and Linda McCartney, Denny Laine, Henry McCullough, and Denny Seiwell.

== Set list ==
The following typical set list was performed in Amsterdam on 20 August, 1972:

1. "Eat at Home"
2. "Smile Away"
3. "Bip Bop"
4. "Mumbo"
5. "1882"
6. "I Would Only Smile"
7. "Give Ireland Back to the Irish"
8. "Blue Moon of Kentucky"
9. "The Mess"
10. "Best Friend"
11. "Soily"
12. "I Am Your Singer"
13. "Henry's Blues"
14. "Say You Don't Mind"
15. "Seaside Woman"
16. "Wild Life"
17. "My Love"
18. "Mary Had A Little Lamb"
19. "Maybe I'm Amazed"
20. "Hi, Hi, Hi"
21. "Long Tall Sally"

This set list remained largely static for the duration of the tour. Other songs played, tried on only one date each, included "Will the Circle Be Unbroken?", "Help Me Darling" (penned by McCartney), "Turkey in the Straw" and "Cotton Fields (the latter on 22 August 1972 in Antwerp)."

== Tour dates ==
Date	City	Country	Venue
9 July 1972	Ollioules	France	Centre Culturel de Châteauvallon
12 July 1972	Juan-les-Pins	France	Le Théâtre de la Mer Jean Marais
13 July 1972	Arles	France	Théâtre Antique
~~14 July 1972~~	~~Lyon~~	France	Unknown – Show canceled
16 July 1972	Paris	France	L'Olympia Bruno Coquatrix
18 July 1972	Munich	West Germany	Circus Krone Building
19 July 1972	Frankfurt	West Germany	Stadthalle Offenbach
21 July 1972	Zürich	Switzerland	Tonhalle
22 July 1972	Montreux	Switzerland	Pavillon Montreux
1 August 1972	Copenhagen	Denmark	K.B. Hallen
4 August 1972	Helsinki	Finland	Messuhalli
5 August 1972	Turku	Finland	Kupittaa Sports Hall
7 August 1972	Stockholm	Sweden	Gröna Lund
8 August 1972	Örebro	Sweden	Idrottshuset
9 August 1972	Oslo	Norway	Njårdhallen
10 August 1972	Gothenburg	Sweden	Scandinavium
11 August 1972	Lund	Sweden	Olympen
12 August 1972	Odense	Denmark	Fyns Forum
14 August 1972	Aarhus	Denmark	Vejlby-Risskov Hallen
16 August 1972	Düsseldorf	West Germany	Rheinhalle
17 August 1972	Rotterdam	Netherlands	De Doelen
19 August 1972	Groningen	Netherlands	Evenementenhal Martinihal
20 August 1972	Amsterdam	Netherlands	Concertgebouw
21 August 1972	The Hague	Netherlands	Nederlands Congresgebouw
22 August 1972	Antwerp	Belgium	Kinema Roma
24 August 1972	West Berlin	West Germany	Deutschlandhalle
