= The Oriental Nightfish =

1978 animated film directed by Ian Emes

The Oriental Nightfish is a 1978 animated film directed by Ian Emes which accompanies the Linda McCartney composition "The Oriental Nightfish". The film has a running time of 4m 30s and features animation by Ian Emes with the track "The Oriental Nightfish" performed by Wings, the band Linda and her husband Paul McCartney were members of.

== Creation ==
In 2010, Emes commented:

I got pissed off whisky and put the music on as loud as it would go, and lay on my back in the living room and let it wash over me. The whisky did indeed help, and I came up with this weird idea where alien forces enter this building where someone who looks like Linda McCartney plays a Gothic Expressionistic Wurlitzer. This woman with blonde hair is penetrated, got naked and inhabited by the alien force, then she's replicated, before becoming a comet that explodes. The film was a bit weird, scary and a little bit sexual. Yet it was later put on Paul McCartney's Rupert The Bear video for children. The kids who watched it years ago are now in their 20s, and they've set up an internet site called The Oriental Nightfish Haunted My Childhood. I guess it freaked them out and opened their imagination.

The Facebook group 'Oriental Nightfish Haunted My Childhood' began in 2008.

== Personnel ==
- Linda McCartney – lead vocals, electric piano, moog synthesizer
- Paul McCartney – bass, guitar, drums, mellotron
- Denny Laine – flute

== Availability ==
After being widely bootlegged as a Beatles-adjacent recording, the track "Oriental Nightfish" was released in 1998 on a compilation of songs sung and/or written by Linda McCartney, Wide Prairie, following her death earlier that year.

The video for "The Oriental Nightfish" was made available on the VHS release of Rupert and the Frog Song. However, the DVD Tales of Wonder: Music and Animation Classics (2004) (also released as Paul McCartney's Music and Animation Collection) does not contain it.
