= Wings University Tour =

1972 concert tour by Wings

- UK tour by Wings
- Location: UK
- Associated album: Wild Life
- Start date: 9 February 1972
- End date: 23 February 1972
- Legs: 1
- No. of shows: 11

Wings concert chronology
- Wings University Tour (1972); Wings Over Europe Tour (1972)

Wings University Tour was an impromptu UK concert tour by Paul McCartney & Wings in 1972, shortly after the band's formation and initial album release, Wild Life. Wings' lineup for the tour was Paul and Linda McCartney, Denny Laine, Henry McCullough, and Denny Seiwell.

== Background ==
McCartney had formed Wings for the purpose of having a band to go on the road with again, and he wasted no time in doing just that. During the waning years of the Beatles, notably during the Get Back sessions, he had suggested they return to live performances by showing up unannounced at pubs and playing for the patrons, but the idea was never seriously considered by the other Beatles. From 2 to 7 February 1972, Wings held rehearsals for the tour at London's Institute of Contemporary Arts (ICA). The rehearsals were filmed by Tyncho Films, and titled by McCartney as The ICA Rehearsal, and features footage of: "The Mess", "Wild Life", "Bip Bop", "Blue Moon of Kentucky", "Maybellene", "Seaside Woman", "My Love", "Give Ireland Back to the Irish" and "Lucille". A short excerpt of the footage was included in the TV documentary Wings Over the World.

== Locations, fee ==
McCartney took the band on an impromptu tour of the United Kingdom's universities. Beginning on 9 February Wings would arrive—often unannounced—at destinations McCartney would later refer to in the 2001 documentary Wingspan as venues which simply "sounded [interesting]" to the band, and would subsequently perform live for whoever happened to be on campus on the date of their arrival. He would later reflect on the mechanisms and motives of this tour as being a phase in the construction of the band he had formed, stating: "For me, it was like building the whole thing from square one."

The band's intended first stop on the tour, Ashby de la Zouch, had no suitable venue, so the band moved on to the more receptive Nottingham, with Paul performing his first paying concert since 1966. Admission to the first show which was held at 12 noon in the Portland Building Ballroom was GBP 0.40, proceeds being split up equally among the band members. At Hull, the word circulated fast, and a full hall of about 800 welcomed Wings at 50p per head. At Leeds (50p) the gig had a generator on standby as a precaution against the powercuts due to the miners' strike.

== Tour dates ==
Date	City	Country	Venue
United Kingdom
9 February 1972	Nottingham	England	University of Nottingham
10 February 1972	York	England	University of York
11 February 1972	Kingston upon Hull	England	Hull University - West Refectory
13 February 1972	Newcastle upon Tyne	England	Havelock Hall
14 February 1972	Lancaster	England	Lancaster University
16 February 1972	Leeds	England	Leeds Town Hall
17 February 1972	Sheffield	England	Sheffield University
18 February 1972	Salford	England	Salford University
21 February 1972	Birmingham	England	Deb Hall
22 February 1972	Swansea	Wales	Swansea University
23 February 1972	Oxford	England	Oxford University
