= Seaside Woman =

- UK picture sleeve

Single by Suzy and the Red Stripes
- B-side: "B-Side to Seaside"
- Released: 31 May 1977 (US); 10 August 1979 (UK)
- Recorded: 20 March 1972
- Studio: AIR (London)
- Genre: Reggae
- Length: 3:36
- Label: Epic (US); A&M (UK)
- Songwriter: Linda McCartney
- Producer: Paul McCartney

Wings singles chronology
"Maybe I'm Amazed" (1977)	"Seaside Woman" (1977)	"Mull of Kintyre" / "Girls' School" (1977)

"Seaside Woman" is a 1977 single by Wings released under the pseudonym Suzy and the Red Stripes. It charted at number 59 in the US and in the UK at number 90 in 1986.

== History ==
"Seaside Woman" was the first song Linda McCartney wrote by herself, in response to a lawsuit by Northern Songs and Maclen Music alleging Paul had violated an exclusive rights agreement by claiming to collaborate with Linda on the song "Another Day". The collaboration transferred a 50% share of the publishing royalties to his own McCartney Music company. According to a 1974 interview with Linda, she wrote the song during a McCartney family visit to Jamaica in 1971 "when ATV was suing us saying I was incapable of writing, so Paul said, 'Get out and write a song.'" The lawsuit, which alleged that Linda's co-writing credits were inauthentic and that she was not a real songwriter, was "amicably settled," according to an ATV spokesman, in June 1972.

Wings first performed "Seaside Woman" during the Wings University Tour in February 1972. On July 14, during their Wings Over Europe Tour, a show in France was cancelled, so the band recorded an early version of "Seaside Woman" at EMI Pathé Marconi Studios in Paris. The released version was recorded on 20 March 1972 by Wings during the sessions for Red Rose Speedway (1973).

== Release ==
The single was first released five years after the recording, in 1977, on Epic in the US, due to the efforts of Epic's Steve Popovich, who was given label credit for mastering the original single. The B-side, "B-Side to Seaside", was written by Paul and Linda McCartney and recorded by the McCartneys (without Wings) in March 1977. Two years later, "Seaside Woman" was released by A&M Records in the UK in a regular version, which featured diagonal red stripes on the cover and circular ones on the label, and a special "boxed" version with 10 "saucy" seaside-style postcards. In 1986, a remixed version was released by EMI on 7" and an extended 12" version.

Both sides of the single were later included on Linda McCartney's posthumous album Wide Prairie.

== Personnel ==
According to Luca Perasi:

- Linda McCartney – lead and backing vocals, electric piano
- Paul McCartney – harmony and backing vocals, bass guitar
- Denny Laine – piano, electric guitar, backing vocals
- Henry McCullough – electric guitar
- Denny Seiwell – drums

Technical

- Paul McCartney – producer
- Phil Chapman – engineer

== Cartoon ==
"Seaside Woman" was turned into a cartoon short by Oscar Grillo in 1980. It depicts a young Jamaican girl and her loving parents who tend the fishing lines in Jamaica. The film won the Short Film Palme d'Or at the 1980 Cannes Film Festival. The cartoon was released (along with The Oriental Nightfish) on the VHS and LaserDisc issues of Rupert and the Frog Song.
