= Wingspan (film) =

2001 film

- DVD cover
- Directed by: Alistair Donald
- Based on: Paul McCartney's musical career
- Produced by: Paul McCartney; Alistair Donald; Mary McCartney
- Cinematography: Richard Numeroff
- Edited by: Philip Shane
- Distributed by: ABC (U.S.); Channel 4 (UK)
- Release dates: 11 May 2001 (U.S.); 20 May 2001 (UK)
- Running time: 2 hours
- Countries: United Kingdom; United States
- Language: English

Wingspan is a 2001 made-for-television documentary film about Paul McCartney's musical career, after The Beatles disbanded, with his second band, Wings. The film was directed by McCartney's son-in-law Alistair Donald, and features members of his family, along with archival footage from other musical guests.

Produced by the McCartneys' MPL Communications, it was broadcast around the world to accompany the contemporary release of a two-disc retrospective collection from McCartney's solo career, titled Wingspan: Hits and History. An accompanying book, also titled Wingspan, based upon the documentary's script as edited by Beatles historian Mark Lewisohn, was published in 2002.

== Synopsis ==
Formed around an interview between Paul McCartney and his daughter Mary McCartney (who co-produced it with her then-husband Alistair Donald, its director), it uses the McCartneys' film and photographic archive to tell the story of Paul and Linda's founding of the band Wings in the aftermath of The Beatles' split and of its gradual evolution during the 1970s, through several line-ups. From an initial atmosphere of critical disdain and personal derision for both McCartneys the film charts the band's progress to its commercial peaks of international success and acclaim before it suffers its own disintegration at the beginning of the 1980s.

The story takes up with the meeting in 1967 of Paul McCartney and photographer Linda Eastman against the background of the gradual disintegration of relationships in The Beatles. As the pair get married and withdraw from the situation of McCartney's public resignation from and legal action against The Beatles partnership, the story moves to his depressed retreat from public life in the aftermath of The Beatles' split, his initial solo albums and his gradual return to recording and playing live with a new band, Wings, formed by the pair with drummer Denny Seiwell and guitarists Denny Laine and Henry McCullough.

The initial line-up's tentative tours and releases are detailed before the sudden departure of Seiwell and McCullough leads to Wings' first big commercial breakthrough, the 1973 album Band on the Run. The rebuilding of the band line-up, bringing in guitarist Jimmy McCulloch and drummer Geoff Britton, soon replaced by Joe English, proceeds against Wings' continued commercial ascent, culminating in their 1976 world tour which brings success which begins to rival that of The Beatles. This continues, even after the line-up is once again reduced to the trio of the McCartneys and Laine, who release a single, "Mull of Kintyre" / "Girls' School", in 1977, which tops the UK's best-selling singles of all time, previously headed by The Beatles' "She Loves You". Although a further five-piece line-up evolves and Wings continue to tour (with guitarist Laurence Juber and drummer Steve Holley), it is against McCartney's feeling that he has proved beyond doubt that there is life for him after The Beatles.

The story's climax comes with McCartney's arrest and imprisonment in Japan in 1980 on drugs charges, at the start of Wings' tour there, leading to the end of the band.

== Cast ==
- Paul McCartney
- Heather McCartney
- James McCartney
- Linda McCartney (archive footage)
- Mary McCartney
- Stella McCartney
- Denny Laine (archive footage)
- Denny Seiwell (archive footage)
- Geoff Britton (archive footage)
- Jimmy McCulloch (archive footage)
- Laurence Juber (archive footage)
- Steve Holley (archive footage)
- Elton John (archive footage)
- Keith Moon (archive footage)
- Ron Wood (archive footage)
- George Harrison (archive footage)
- John Lennon (archive footage)

== Background ==
McCartney told ABC News his thoughts on the film:

"The great thing about this story is it's got a lot of human drama, because it was a struggle trying to put it together after The Beatles — I mean, The Beatles' career itself was a struggle, and then having reached those heights, to try and do it over and at the same time bring up a young family was quite an interesting human interest story. And that comes over, I think. It's quite dramatic and pretty moving. And then, I think, you realize that Wings was a pretty good band."

== Commercial release on VHS and DVD ==
Expanded versions of the film, titled Wingspan - An Intimate Portrait were also released commercially on VHS and DVD in 2001, the latter featuring an additional 22 minutes of interview footage and a number of promotional videos.

== Reception ==
American pop music critic Robert Hilburn opined that "just when you thought VH1's Behind the Music had reduced every rock story to a cliche and that there wasn’t anything more you needed to know about any of the Beatles, 'Wingspan' is as intimate and inviting as McCartney’s most melodic songs". He said the documentary "offers lots of home movie footage and a generous amount of concert shots, but its heart revolves around McCartney reminiscing about putting his life together after the traumatic break-up of the Beatles in 1970 ... which makes it a surprising and endearing entry in the overcrowded world of pop documentaries".

John Levesque of the Seattle Post-Intelligencer stated it "is a pleasant ride for anyone with passing interest in one of the most gifted and prolific composers of the rock era ... the film "plays like a combination VH1 retrospective and Barbara Walters special ... superbly edited, and with a soundtrack to awaken the memories, it's a cozy mix of information and music about a guy we've known for years, yet hardly know at all". Norman Miller of BBC News wrote "at an hour, skewed towards the 1967-76 period this could have been great, even as a home movie ... what we got started promisingly but quickly palled ... a bit like most Wings songs really".

Dan Rodricks, a columnist for The Baltimore Sun, commented that he had "no interest in Wings or the music it made, but I loved this film for the other, more human stories it tells about a husband and wife searching for a way to have a fulfilling life as personal and professional partners". He further stated he had "never seen a documentary humanize a superstar the way 'Wingspan' does Paul McCartney and his late wife, Linda, who died of breast cancer in 1998". Overall, he said "it is a fascinating and inspirational love story of our times".

=== Wingspan: Hits and History ===
British music critic Mick Houghton of Mojo Magazine said the two-disc retrospective collection "manages to achieve a remarkable consistency in performance and breadth of songwriting ... across these generously appointed two-and-a-half hours, we can finally see what an impressive body of solo work McCartney has created ... for the most part these songs genuinely measure up to the standard of The Beatles' McCartney penned tracks". Stephen Dalton from Uncut Magazine opined that "this two-hours-plus archive, complete with an accompanying TV film, the old sweet'n'sour genius of Lennon-McCartney is replaced by twinkly sentiments and treacly arrangements ... prolonged exposure to Paul and Linda's overly cute blend of Kinksian music-hall whimsy, woolly anti-war slogans, ersatz Fifties boogie-woogie and Smug Marrieds contentment becomes tiresome".

=== Awards and nominations ===
- Nominated for Cinema Audio Society Award for Outstanding Achievement in Sound Mixing for Television Non Fiction, Variety or Music – Series or Specials 2001, for Grant Maxwell, Howie Nicol, Nick Robertson, Sean O'Neil, Jonathan Mitchell

== See also ==
- The Beatles Anthology
