= Wide Prairie =

1998 compilation album by Linda McCartney

Studio album / Compilation by Linda McCartney
- Released: 26 October 1998
- Recorded: 1972–1980, 1987–1989, 1998
- Genres: Pop, rock
- Length: 52:09
- Label: Parlophone
- Producers: Paul McCartney; Linda McCartney; Lee Perry; Ian Maidman
- Compiler: Paul McCartney

Linda McCartney chronology
Ram (1971)	Wide Prairie (1998)

Singles from Wide Prairie
- 1. "Wide Prairie" Released: 9 November 1998; 2. "The Light Comes from Within" Released: January 1999

Professional ratings
Review scores
Source	Rating
AllMusic	3/5 stars
Entertainment Weekly	B−
NME	2/10
Pitchfork	6.8/10

Wide Prairie is a posthumous compilation album by Linda McCartney, compiled by her husband Paul McCartney and released in October 1998, roughly six months after her death due to breast cancer. The idea for the album was inspired by a fan who wrote to Paul McCartney inquiring about "Seaside Woman", a song Wings released under the name Suzy and the Red Stripes featuring Linda on lead vocals.

== Promotion and reception ==
To promote the album, Paul McCartney held an 80-minute webcast on 17 December 1998. During the show, McCartney answered questions submitted by fans about Linda and the recording of the album, played promo videos and cooked mashed potatoes. The album reached number 127 in the UK charts with two singles released in support. The title track made the top 75, at number 74, while "The Light Comes from Within" charted at number 56.

== Track listing ==
All tracks are written by Linda McCartney, except where noted.

No.	Title	Writer(s)	Recording Information	Length
1.	"Wide Prairie"		Recorded by Wings on 20 November 1973 in Paris, and in July 1974 in Nashville, Tennessee.	4:33
2.	"New Orleans"		Recorded in New Orleans February 1975 during Wings sessions for their album Venus and Mars, with further recording taking place on 24 May 1979.	3:13
3.	"The White Coated Man"	Linda McCartney, Paul McCartney, Carla Lane	Recorded on 21 March 1988 and on 18 July 1989, a song critical of the practice of vivisection.	2:13
4.	"Love's Full Glory"		Recorded on 16 July and October 1980	3:46
5.	"I Got Up"	L. McCartney, P. McCartney	Recorded on 11 November 1973 and 20 March and 9 July 1998.	3:19
6.	"The Light Comes from Within"	L. McCartney, P. McCartney	Recorded on 18 March 1998 in Paul's Hog Hill Studio with Paul and son James McCartney, this turned out to be Linda's final recording session before her death.	2:57
7.	"Mister Sandman"	Pat Ballard	Recorded in Jamaica at The Black Ark studio, on 20 June 1977 and in Scotland in August of the same year.	2:50
8.	"Seaside Woman"		Recorded by Wings on 27 November 1972. Released as a single on 31 May 1977. Included in a short film by Oscar Grillo that won the Palme d'Or award at the Cannes Film Festival. The first song Linda ever wrote, according to Paul.	3:54
9.	"Oriental Nightfish"		Recorded by Wings on 4 October 1973 during sessions for Band on the Run. Included in a short film titled Oriental Nightfish by Linda McCartney and Ian Emes.	2:49
10.	"Endless Days"	L. McCartney, Mick Bolton	Recorded on 21 October 1987.	3:11
11.	"Poison Ivy"	Jerry Leiber and Mike Stoller	Recorded on 21 October 1987.	2:54
12.	"Cow"	L. McCartney, P. McCartney, Lane	Recorded on 24 July 1988.	4:24
13.	"B-side to Seaside"	L. McCartney, P. McCartney	Recorded on 16 March 1977 specifically as the B-side for the single "Seaside Woman".	2:38
14.	"Sugartime"	Charlie Phillips, Odis Echols	Recorded in Jamaica at The Black Ark studio, on 20 June 1977 and on 7 July 1998 in England.	2:06
15.	"Cook of the House"	L. McCartney, P. McCartney	Originally released in 1976 on the Wings album Wings at the Speed of Sound and also as the B-side to "Silly Love Songs".	2:37
16.	"Appaloosa"	L. McCartney, P. McCartney	Recorded on 7 March 1998 in Paul's Hog Hill Studio, inspired by the history of the Nez Perce tribe and their Appaloosa horses.	4:44

== Personnel ==
- Linda McCartney – lead, backing and harmony vocals, piano, electric piano, keyboards, mellotron, synthesizer
- Paul McCartney – backing and harmony vocals, speaking voice, bass, double bass, electric and acoustic guitars, banjo, piano, electric piano, clavinet, electronic organ, organ, mellotron, synthesizer, string synthesizer, drums, drum machine, congas, engineer, cover design
- James McCartney – electric and acoustic guitar (on "The Light Comes from Within")
- Denny Laine – electric and acoustic guitars, backing vocals (on "I Got Up"), piano (on "Seaside Woman"), flute (on "Oriental Nightfish")
- Jimmy McCulloch – electric guitar (on "Wide Prairie", "I Got Up" and "Cook of the House")
- Henry McCullough – electric guitar (on "Seaside Woman")
- Laurence Juber – acoustic guitar (on "Love's Full Glory")
- Robbie McIntosh – electric guitar (on "The White Coated Man")
- Billy Boy – electric guitar (on "Mister Sandman")
- Lloyd Green – pedal steel guitar (on "Love's Full Glory")
- Boris Gardiner – bass guitar (on "Mister Sandman" and "Sugartime")
- Joe English – drums (on "New Orleans" and "Cook of the House")
- Denny Seiwell – drums (on "Seaside Woman")
- Mike "Boo" Richards – drums (on "Mister Sandman" and "Sugartime")
- Davey Lutton – drums (on "Wide Prairie" and "I Got Up")
- Ian Maidman – bass, drums, engineer and producer (on "Endless Days" and "Poison Ivy"), electric guitar and backing vocals (on "Poison Ivy")
- Geoffrey Richardson – mandolin, slide guitar (on "Endless Days")
- Mick Bolton – piano, keyboards, backing vocals (on "Endless Days" and "Poison Ivy")
- Steve Johnson – string synthesizer, synth bass, trumpet (on "The White Coated Man")
- Winston Wright – keyboards (on "Mister Sandman")
- Vassar Clements and Johnny Gimble - fiddles (on "Wide Prairie")
- Thaddeus Richard – alto saxophone (on "Wide Prairie")
- William Puett – tenor saxophone (on "Wide Prairie")
- Norman Ray – baritone saxophone (on "Wide Prairie")
- Hewlett Quillen – trombone (on "Wide Prairie")
- George Tidwell and Barry McDonald – trumpets (on "Wide Prairie")
- Steve Fletcher – backing vocals (on "Poison Ivy")
- Carla Lane – spoken verse (on "The White Coated Man" and "Cow")
- Lee Perry – producer (on "Mister Sandman" and "Sugartime")
