= Give Ireland Back to the Irish =

Single by Wings
- B-side: "Give Ireland Back to the Irish (Version)"
- Released: 18 February 1972 (UK)
- Recorded: 1–3 February 1972
- Studio: EMI and Island, London
- Genre: Rock, protest song
- Length: 3:42
- Label: Apple
- Songwriters: Paul McCartney, Linda McCartney
- Producer: Paul McCartney

Wings singles chronology
"Give Ireland Back to the Irish" (1972)	"Mary Had a Little Lamb" (1972)

"Give Ireland Back to the Irish" is the debut single by the British rock band Wings that was released in February 1972. It was written by Paul McCartney and his wife Linda in response to the events of Bloody Sunday, on 30 January that year, when British troops in Northern Ireland shot dead thirteen civil rights protestors. Keen to voice their outrage at the killings, Wings recorded the track two days later at EMI Studios in London. It was the band's first song to include Northern Irish guitarist Henry McCullough.

"Give Ireland Back to the Irish" was banned from broadcast in the UK by the BBC and other organisations, and was overlooked by the majority of radio programmers in the United States. The single peaked at number 16 on the UK Singles Chart and number 21 on the US Billboard Hot 100, but topped the Irish Singles Chart for one week in March 1972. Having never released an overtly political song before, McCartney was condemned by the British media for his seemingly pro-IRA stance on Northern Ireland. As with Wings' then-recent album, Wild Life, the song was also maligned by many music critics. These writers found McCartney's lyrics overly simplistic and viewed the single as an attempt by him to gain credibility for his new band on the back of a pressing political issue.

Wings performed "Give Ireland Back to the Irish" throughout their February 1972 tour of English and Welsh universities. The track first appeared on an album in 1993, when it was included as a bonus track on the CD reissue of Wild Life.

== Background and inspiration ==
Following the release of his band Wings' debut album, Wild Life, in December 1971, Paul McCartney spent Christmas and New Year in New York visiting the family of his wife and bandmate Linda. The visit also allowed McCartney to begin rebuilding his relationship with John Lennon, his former writing partner in the Beatles, after the pair had spent the year attacking each other through the music press and in their respective musical releases. The McCartneys then returned to the UK, intent on preparing to launch Wings as a live act. In January 1972, Wings began rehearsing in London with a new fifth member, Northern Irishman Henry McCullough, on lead guitar, who joined on the recommendation of the band's guitarist and occasional singer, Denny Laine.

On 29 January, McCartney returned to New York, where, during another meeting with Lennon, they agreed to end their public feud. The following day, McCartney wrote the song "Give Ireland Back to the Irish" in response to the news that British troops in Derry in Northern Ireland had just shot dead thirteen civil rights marchers, who represented the Catholic minority, and wounded many others during a protest march. With strong familial connections to Ireland on his late mother's side, McCartney was appalled at Britain's role in what became known as Bloody Sunday, and penned his protest song the very next day. McCartney later recalled: "I wasn't really into protest songs – John had done that – but this time I felt that I had to write something, to use my art to protest."

== Recording ==
Two days after Bloody Sunday, McCartney arranged a session with Wings to rush-record "Give Ireland Back to the Irish", turning up at EMI Studios unannounced. The band agreed to release the song as a single, although author Howard Sounes suggests that McCullough, as an Ulster Protestant, may have had his misgivings. The track was recorded on 1 February at EMI's Abbey Road Studios with engineer Tony Clark. On 3 February, the band then moved to Island Studios, where final overdubs were added and the song was mixed. The track was mastered at Apple Studios. This marked the first time that McCartney had worked in the Beatles' Apple Studios since the group's break-up in April 1970. (Note: McCartney continued to have differences with his three former bandmates regarding the Beatles' Apple record label, to which he was still reluctantly signed as a recording artist. Despite this, George Harrison, when attending the launch of the refurbished studios in September 1971, had expressed the hope that McCartney would use the facility, given that "We all own the business, and it's doing well.")

The B-side of the single, "Give Ireland Back to the Irish (Version)", is an instrumental version of the song. McCartney used this rather than another song since, anticipating problems over the political content, he thought that if disc jockeys decided to favour the B-side to avoid the lyrics being heard, they would still have to mention the track's title. McCartney took the rhythm section parts from the A-side and overdubbed lead guitar lines (played by himself and McCullough) and an Irish penny whistle. Seeking to emulate the low-fidelity quality of Jamaican reggae singles, where instrumental dubs were commonly used as B-sides, McCartney gave the track a muddy-sounding mix, with barely any high-end sound.

== Ban and reactions ==
In the United Kingdom, the song was banned by the BBC, and subsequently by Radio Luxembourg and the Independent Television Authority (ITA). BBC Radio 1 DJ John Peel was the only member of those organisations who spoke out in support of McCartney, saying: "The act of banning it is a much stronger political act than the contents of the record itself. It's just one man's opinion."

McCartney later said of the song in the context of the Troubles in Northern Ireland:

From our point of view, it was the first time people questioned what we were doing in Ireland. It was so shocking. I wrote "Give Ireland Back to the Irish", we recorded it and I was promptly 'phoned by the Chairman of EMI, Sir Joseph Lockwood, explaining that they wouldn't release it. He thought it was too inflammatory. I told him that I felt strongly about it and they had to release it. He said, "Well it'll be banned", and of course it was. I knew "Give Ireland Back to the Irish" wasn't an easy route, but it just seemed to me to be the time [to say something].

Wings played "Give Ireland Back to the Irish" throughout their first concert tour, which consisted of a series of unannounced shows at universities in England and Wales over 9–23 February. The BBC banned the song while Wings were in York, where they played at Goodricke College on 10 February. In its issue dated 19 February, Melody Maker reported McCartney's response to the ban: "Up them! I think the BBC should be highly praised, preventing the youth from hearing my opinions."

Writing about the tour for the NME, Geoff Liptrot said the band's performances were generally good, but the song "grated a little with its harsh, sing-song chorus immediately conjuring up visions of a drunk rolling along a street bellowing at the top of his voice". When asked by a reporter from The Guardian whether the shows were fundraisers for the Provisional Irish Republican Army, McCartney declined to comment, beyond saying: "We're simply playing for the people." (Note: With regard to this exchange, Doyle writes: "The fact that [McCartney's] reply was noncommittal shows the strength of feeling in the wake of Bloody Sunday: the idea of passing around the collection hat for the IRA – which only months later intensified its terrorist bombing campaign – was not yet considered taboo.") Guitarist Henry McCullough's involvement with the song led to his brother Samuel being beaten up in an Irish pub, in Kilburn, an area of north-west London that was popular among Irish expatriates. McCullough initially did not comment on the subject matter publicly, wryly telling Disc magazine that "it's just a message from Paul to Mr. Heath." Months later, he confessed to Sounds that he "had to go through lots of little personal encounters because of what the song said." Laine said that he "didn't return home for years after that".

== Release ==
The "Give Ireland Back to the Irish" single was released by Apple Records on 18 February 1972 in the United Kingdom (as Apple R 5936) and 28 February in the United States (as Apple 1847). It was Wings' debut single release, after the cancellation of their scheduled single from Wild Life, a reggae-style cover of "Love Is Strange". Further to McCartney's refusal to include the Apple logo on the LP face labels for Wild Life, five green Irish shamrocks appeared on the single's customised labels. (Note: According to Linda, during their meeting in January 1972, Lennon had assured McCartney that he would be free to leave the label "by March". In July that year, when he and Wings were still no closer to achieving this aim, McCartney complained that Lennon's support of "the people" and the Rock Liberation Front was hypocritical.) In the US, the song lyrics were reproduced on the yellow paper sleeve enclosing the disc.

On 7 March, Wings were filmed rehearsing "Give Ireland Back to the Irish" at the McCartneys' St John's Wood home in London for a segment on ABC News in the United States. (Note: A portion of this footage later appeared in David Frost's 1975 ABC special A Salute to the Beatles.) McCartney told the ABC reporter that he did not plan to focus on politics in his work, but that "on this one occasion I think the British government overstepped the mark and showed themselves to be more of a sort of oppressive regime than I ever believed them to be." A 30-second television advertisement for the single was produced by Apple but never broadcast by the ITA, who cited the stipulation regarding "political controversy" in the Television Act, by which the organisation was legally bound.

"Give Ireland Back to the Irish" peaked at number 16 on the UK Singles Chart, and number 21 on the Billboard Hot 100 in the United States. According to author Bruce Spizer, listeners there felt alienated by McCartney's political stance and "Airplay was so marginal that the song, for all practical purposes, was also banned by American radio." On the other US singles charts, published by Cash Box and Record World, the single peaked at number 38 and number 36, respectively. (Note: On the other UK charts, the song peaked at number 18 in Melody Maker and number 13 in the NME.)

The single reached number 1 in Ireland and in Spain. McCartney attributed the song's success in Spain to its popularity among Basque nationalists. The A-side was included as a bonus track on the 1993 Paul McCartney Collection CD reissue of Wild Life. In 2018, footage of rehearsals for the song, at the McCartneys' home and at the Institute of Contemporary Arts in London before the 1972 university tour, was included on the DVD in the remastered deluxe edition of Wild Life.

The song and its instrumental version were also included on The 7" Singles Box in 2022.

== Critical reception and legacy ==
As a political statement, "Give Ireland Back to the Irish" was out of character for McCartney and attracted suspicion from contemporary reviewers. Some writers accused him of attempting to project a less wholesome image by aligning himself with British countercultural thinking, as a means of gaining credibility for his faltering career after the Beatles. Another widely held suspicion was that McCartney was attempting to impress John Lennon, who had been vocal in his support for Irish republicanism. In a review of Lennon's 1972 album Some Time in New York City, which included two political songs about Ireland, Richard Williams of Melody Maker wrote: "how sad that the only thing in years on which he and Paul have agreed should have drawn from both their very worst work. Neither 'The Luck of the Irish' nor 'Give Ireland Back to the Irish' can do anything but increase the bigotry of the already ignorant." Writing for Rough Guides in 2003, music critic Chris Ingham said of the Wings single: "The record managed to irritate everyone, not least for its naive, simplistic attitude to a complex situation … but also for its musical mediocrity. The BBC banned the record, granting it a notoriety disproportionate to its importance." On the other hand, upon the single release Cash Box called it "a socially and pop-conscious tune which will hardly need anyone's luck to get to the top."

NME critic Bob Woffinden described "Give Ireland Back to the Irish" as "self-conscious, awkward" in the mould of "Lennon's least successful diatribes". He added that, although Lennon would soon "do far worse", McCartney's song "gave the appearance of being an exploitation single every bit as much as 'tribute' singles that are rushed out in the wake of the death of a star name". Writing in Record Collector in 2001, Peter Doggett said that McCartney's and Lennon's "ill-fated" musical statements on Irish politics, following on from the pair's public sparring in the music press throughout 1971, "combined to tarnish" the four ex-Beatles' standing among music critics in the UK and so contributed to an unjustly harsh critical reception there for George Harrison's 1973 album Living in the Material World.

Authors Chip Madinger and Mark Easter describe the song's lyrics as "clumsy (yet well-intentioned)" and comment that McCartney fully exploited the "'hip' cachet" resulting from the radio ban in his print advertising for the release. They view the song as an unwise choice for Wings' first single, given the relative failure of Wild Life. When compiling the Wingspan greatest hits album in 2001, McCartney had intended to include "Give Ireland Back to the Irish". Following a terrorist incident in London that year, however, he acceded to EMI's request to omit the song, recognising that its inclusion might be viewed as a gesture of support for the IRA.

"Give Ireland Back to the Irish" and McCartney's political stance formed one of the Beatles-related parodies included on National Lampoon magazine's 1972 album Radio Dinner. In the sketch, an Irishman attempts to sing the song in a pub but is soon silenced by a blaze of gunfire.

Singer Morrissey, an Englishman of Irish descent like McCartney, commented, "He also once sang 'Give Ireland back to the Irish,' which was directed at the Queen. Well, she refused, and she still refuses, yet Sir Paul gives her the thumbs up!"

== Personnel ==
- Paul McCartney – lead vocals, bass guitar; lead guitar (instrumental B-side version only); penny whistle (instrumental B-side version only)
- Linda McCartney – backing vocals, RMI Electra Piano
- Denny Laine – backing vocals, electric guitars
- Henry McCullough – electric guitars
- Denny Seiwell – drums
- uncredited – handclaps

== Charts ==
Chart (1972)	Peak position
Australian Go-Set National Top 40	18
Canadian RPM Top 100	46
Irish Singles Chart	1
Japanese Oricon Singles Chart	31
Spanish Singles Chart	1
UK Singles Chart	16
US Billboard Hot 100	21
US Cash Box Top 100	38
US Record World Singles Chart	36

== Sources ==
- Badman, Keith (2001). The Beatles Diary Volume 2: After the Break-Up 1970–2001. London: Omnibus Press. ISBN 978-0-7119-8307-6.
- Benitez, Vincent P. (2010). The Words and Music of Paul McCartney: The Solo Years. Santa Barbara, CA: Praeger. ISBN 978-0-313-34969-0.
- Castleman, Harry; Podrazik, Walter J. (1976). All Together Now: The First Complete Beatles Discography 1961–1975. New York, NY: Ballantine Books. ISBN 0-345-25680-8.
- Clayson, Alan (2003). Paul McCartney. London: Sanctuary. ISBN 1-86074-482-6.
- Doggett, Peter (2011). You Never Give Me Your Money: The Beatles After the Breakup. New York, NY: It Books. ISBN 978-0-06-177418-8.
- Doyle, Tom (2013). Man on the Run: Paul McCartney in the 1970s. New York, NY: Ballantine Books. ISBN 978-0-8041-7914-0.
- Ingham, Chris (2003). The Rough Guide to the Beatles. London: Rough Guides. ISBN 978-1-84353-140-1.
- Kozinn, Allan; Sinclair, Adrian (2022). The McCartney Legacy Volume 1: 1969–73 (1st ed.). New York City: HarperCollins. ISBN 978-0-06-300072-8.
- Madinger, Chip; Easter, Mark (2000). Eight Arms to Hold You: The Solo Beatles Compendium. Chesterfield, MO: 44.1 Productions. ISBN 0-615-11724-4.
- McGee, Garry (2003). Band on the Run: A History of Paul McCartney and Wings. Lanham, MD: Rowman & Littlefield. ISBN 978-0-87833-304-2.
- Perasi, Luca (2013). Paul McCartney: Recording Sessions (1969–2013). Milan, Italy: L.I.L.Y. Publishing. ISBN 978-88-909122-1-4.
- Rodriguez, Robert (2010). Fab Four FAQ 2.0: The Beatles' Solo Years, 1970–1980. Milwaukee, WI: Backbeat Books. ISBN 978-1-4165-9093-4.
- Schaffner, Nicholas (1978). The Beatles Forever. New York, NY: McGraw-Hill. ISBN 0-07-055087-5.
- Sounes, Howard (2010). Fab: An Intimate Life of Paul McCartney. London: HarperCollins. ISBN 978-0-00-723705-0.
- Spizer, Bruce (2005). The Beatles Solo on Apple Records. New Orleans, LA: 498 Productions. ISBN 0-9662649-5-9.
- Woffinden, Bob (1981). The Beatles Apart. London: Proteus. ISBN 0-906071-89-5.
