= Wings 1973 UK Tour =

1973 concert tour by Wings

- Continental tour by Wings
- Poster to the final concert in Newcastle
- Location: UK, Europe
- Associated album: Red Rose Speedway
- Start date: 11 May 1973
- End date: 10 July 1973
- Legs: 2
- No. of shows: 21

Wings concert chronology
- Wings Over Europe Tour (1972); Wings 1973 UK Tour (1973); Wings Over the World tour (1975–76)

Wings 1973 UK Tour was the name of a concert series by Wings during the spring and early summer of 1973, where performed on a twelve-city concert tour of the United Kingdom.

== Promotion ==
The tour was for the purpose of promoting the band's latest album, Red Rose Speedway, as well as the single "Live and Let Die" from the James Bond film of the same name. Another reason for the tour was that McCartney simply enjoying playing live shows.

This was the largest tour yet for Wings. Unlike the surprise appearances of the previous year's Wings University Tour and the spontaneous nature of the follow-up Wings Over Europe Tour, here the tour was announced in more normal fashion and fans could buy tickets ahead of time. Tickets sold well, with a third date being added at the Hammersmith Odeon and other cities being added onto the itinerary. The routing included a return to McCartney's hometown as the band played the Liverpool Empire Theatre on 18 May.

The announced nature of the tour also meant that music critics could arrange to see the shows, and while the press's regard for McCartney and the Wings enterprise in general was fairly low, the concerts got some mixed-to-good notices.

Wings' line-up for the tour was Paul and Linda McCartney, Denny Laine, Henry McCullough, and Denny Seiwell. Shows lasted for around an hour or so. Wings presented a different image on stage during the tour's shows than they did on record, being respectively "undeniably vigorous and invigorating" rather than "tame, even lame," as Tony Palmer wrote for The Observer after seeing the tour's opening night at the Bristol Hippodrome. The band had somewhat more material to play than they had in previous outings, and McCullough's instrumental "Henry's Blue", previously used to fill out the setlist, was not employed. Laine's singing of his former band The Moody Blues' hit "Go Now" was included, however.

As per McCartney's practice with Wings at the time, the three non-McCartney band members did not earn a share of the receipts but rather received a flat rate of £70 a week, with a £1000 bonus paid at the tour's conclusion. This reinforced the financial dissatisfaction that Seiwell was feeling with vaguely promised royalties from Wings' recordings not coming to him. McCullough was also unhappy with the monetary situation and furthermore resented having to share the stage with Linda McCartney. Although her keyboard playing had improved from before, she still qualified as a musical amateur. Overall, the group began coming apart during the tour. The situation with Seiwell and McCollough would soon reach a breaking point in the weeks immediately afterward, and both quit Wings shortly before the group left for Lagos, Nigeria to record Band on the Run.

The support act for the entire tour was pub rock band Brinsley Schwarz. Paul and Linda asked them to be on the tour after seeing them perform at the London Hard Rock Cafe's opening night a few weeks previously. Prior to the tour, Wings had performed unannounced at the Hard Rock on 18 March in support of the charity organisation Release.

During a break in the tour itinerary, the McCartneys went exploring and ended up buying a secluded house, Waterfall, in Peasmarsh, Surrey, which would end up becoming their main residence.

== Tour dates ==
Date	City	Country	Venue
United Kingdom
11 May 1973	Bristol	England	Bristol Hippodrome
12 May 1973	Oxford	England	New Theatre Oxford
13 May 1973	Cardiff	Wales	Capitol Theatre
15 May 1973	Bournemouth	England	Bournemouth Winter Gardens
16 May 1973	Manchester	England	Hardrock Concert Theatre
17 May 1973	Manchester	England	Hardrock Concert Theatre
18 May 1973	Liverpool	England	Liverpool Empire Theatre; 2 performances
19 May 1973	Leeds	England	University of Leeds Refectory
21 May 1973	Preston	England	Preston Guild Hall
22 May 1973	Newcastle upon Tyne	England	Newcastle Odeon
23 May 1973	Edinburgh	Scotland	Odeon Cinema; 2 performances
24 May 1973	Glasgow	Scotland	Green's Playhouse
25 May 1973	London	England	Hammersmith Odeon
26 May 1973	London	England	Hammersmith Odeon
27 May 1973	London	England	Hammersmith Odeon
4 July 1973	Sheffield	England	Sheffield City Hall
6 July 1973	Birmingham	England	Birmingham Odeon
9 July 1973	Leicester	England	Odeon
10 July 1973	Newcastle upon Tyne	England	Newcastle City Hall

A source:

== Cited bibliography ==
- McGee, Garry (2003). Band on the Run: A History of Paul McCartney and Wings. Lanham, Maryland: Taylor Trade Publishing.
- Rodriguez, Robert (2010). Fab Four FAQ 2.0: The Beatles' Solo Years, 1970–1980. Milwaukee: Backbeat Books.
- Sounes, Howard (2010). Fab: An Intimate Life of Paul McCartney. London: HarperCollins.
