= Paul McCartney and Wings =

British rock band (1971–1981)

Wings
- Wings in 1976 (L–R): Denny Laine, Jimmy McCulloch, Paul McCartney, Linda McCartney and Joe English

Background information
- Also known as: Paul McCartney and Wings; Suzy and the Red Stripes; The Country Hams
- Origin: London, England
- Genres: Rock; soft rock
- Years active: 1971–1981
- Labels: Apple; Capitol; Parlophone; Columbia
- Spinoff of: The Beatles
- Past members: Paul McCartney; Linda McCartney; Denny Laine; Denny Seiwell; Henry McCullough; Jimmy McCulloch; Geoff Britton; Joe English; Steve Holley; Laurence Juber

Wings, sometimes billed as Paul McCartney and Wings, were a British rock band from 1971 to 1981, formed in London. The core members were Paul McCartney, a former member of the Beatles, on vocals and bass, his wife Linda McCartney on keyboards, and Moody Blues alumnus Denny Laine on guitar and vocals. They were noted for their commercial successes, musical eclecticism, and frequent personnel changes. They went through three lead guitarists and four drummers; the core trio of the McCartneys and Laine, however, remained intact throughout the group's existence.

Originally consisting of the McCartneys, Laine, and drummer Denny Seiwell, the band's first two albums, Wild Life (1971) and Red Rose Speedway (1973), the latter featuring guitarist Henry McCullough, were viewed as artistic disappointments beside Paul McCartney's work with the Beatles. After the release of the title track of the James Bond film Live and Let Die, McCullough and Seiwell resigned from the band. The McCartneys and Laine then released 1973's Band on the Run, a commercial and critical success that spawned two top-ten singles in "Jet" and the title track. Following that album, the band recruited guitarist Jimmy McCulloch and drummer Geoff Britton, only for Britton to quit shortly afterward and be replaced by Joe English. With the new line-up, Wings released 1975's Venus and Mars, which included the US number-one single "Listen to What the Man Said", and undertook a highly successful world tour over 1975–76. Intended as more of a group effort, Wings at the Speed of Sound (1976) was issued midway through the tour and featured the hit singles "Silly Love Songs" and "Let 'Em In".

In 1977, McCulloch and English departed before the release of Wings' only UK number-one single, "Mull of Kintyre", which became one of the best-selling UK singles in history. Following the 1978 album London Town, the McCartneys and Laine added guitarist Laurence Juber and drummer Steve Holley. The resulting album, Back to the Egg, underperformed and received negative reviews. During the supporting tour, Paul McCartney was arrested in Japan for cannabis possession, putting the band on hold. Following a US number one with a live-recorded version of "Coming Up" (1980), Wings disbanded in 1981 after Laine departed. In total, Wings had six number-one singles on the Billboard Hot 100.

== History ==
=== Origins ===
After the break-up of the Beatles in 1970, Paul McCartney recorded two solo albums: McCartney (1970), credited to himself, and Ram (1971), with his wife Linda. He had insisted from the beginning of their marriage that Linda should be involved in his musical projects, notwithstanding her lack of experience as a musician. Ram was recorded in New York City, where McCartney auditioned a number of drummers and guitarists, selecting Seiwell and guitarist David Spinozza. When Spinozza became unavailable because of other session commitments, Hugh McCracken was enlisted to take his place.

=== 1971–1974: Formation and Wild Life to Band on the Run ===
After the release of Ram, McCartney decided to form a new group and asked Seiwell and McCracken to join. Seiwell accepted, but McCracken declined, so McCartney invited former Moody Blues guitarist and singer Denny Laine, whom he had known since the early 1960s, to join. Laine, who was working on a solo album at the time, got a phone call from McCartney enquiring if he would like to work with him, as McCartney said: "I'd known him in the past and I just rang him and asked him, 'What are you doing?' He said, 'Nothing', so I said, 'Right. Come on then!'" Laine then dropped plans for his album there and then. McCartney would serve as the bassist and lead singer for Wings and he doubled on guitar, keyboards, drums and assorted instruments at various times. When asked why he stayed on bass guitar rather than change back to guitar after the Beatles disbanded, he has explained that by then, he was "a bass player pretty much, who also happened to play guitar" and also considers himself a bassist who happens to play piano.

In July 1971, Seiwell and Laine joined the McCartneys to record Paul's third post-Beatles album for Apple Records. The result was Wild Life, released in December. It was the first project to credit Wings as the artist. The band name is said to have come to Paul McCartney as he was praying in the hospital while Linda was giving birth to their second child, Stella, on 13 September 1971. Paul McCartney recalled in the film Wingspan that the birth of Stella was "a bit of a drama"; there were complications at the birth and that both Linda and the baby almost died. He was praying fervently and the image of wings came to his mind. He decided to name his new band "Wings".

In an attempt to capture the spontaneity of live performances, five of Wild Life's eight songs were first takes by the band. The album included a cover of Mickey & Sylvia's "Love Is Strange". Like Ram, Wild Life left music critics cold, a response that typified the anti-McCartney sentiments that prevailed among the music press following the Beatles' break-up. In their 1975 book The Beatles: An Illustrated Record, Roy Carr and Tony Tyler called Wild Life "rushed, defensive, badly timed, and over-publicized", and wrote that it showed McCartney's songwriting "at an absolute nadir just when he needed a little respect". Wings similarly struggled to gain artistic credibility, particularly during the early 1970s, with critics, fans and McCartney's musical peers ridiculing the inclusion of Linda as a keyboard player and backing vocalist.

On 24 January 1972, McCartney added to the Wings line-up guitarist Henry McCullough, after he had tried out for the band. The new line-up immediately mounted an impromptu tour of UK universities (with the group driving around in a van), followed by a tour of small European venues. Although this was the first tour including an ex-Beatle after the Beatles broke up, Wings played no Beatles numbers during the tour, to show that it was a new band in its own right.

In February 1972, Wings released a single called "Give Ireland Back to the Irish", a response to the events of Bloody Sunday. The song was banned by the BBC for its anti-Unionist political stance. Despite limited airplay, it reached number 16 in the UK, as well as number 1 in both the Republic of Ireland and Spain. Wings released a children's song, "Mary Had a Little Lamb", as its next single, which reached the top 10 in the UK. Although some critics interpreted it as a sarcastic reaction to the ban on "Give Ireland Back to the Irish", it was in fact a serious effort by McCartney to record a song for children. Wings followed it with December 1972's "Hi, Hi, Hi", which was again banned by the BBC, this time for its alleged drug and sexual references. The B-side, "C Moon", was played instead. The single peaked at number 5 in the UK.

The band were renamed "Paul McCartney and Wings" for the 1973 album Red Rose Speedway (and for the follow-up Band on the Run), which yielded their first US number 1 hit, "My Love". The album included two tracks left over from the Ram sessions and was originally intended as a two-record set. After producer Glyn Johns walked out on the project, however, McCartney deferred to EMI's opinion that the material was "substandard" and cut it down to a single disc. Among the unreleased songs from the seven-month sessions was the Linda McCartney composition "Seaside Woman", which was later issued in 1977, credited to "Suzy and the Red Stripes".

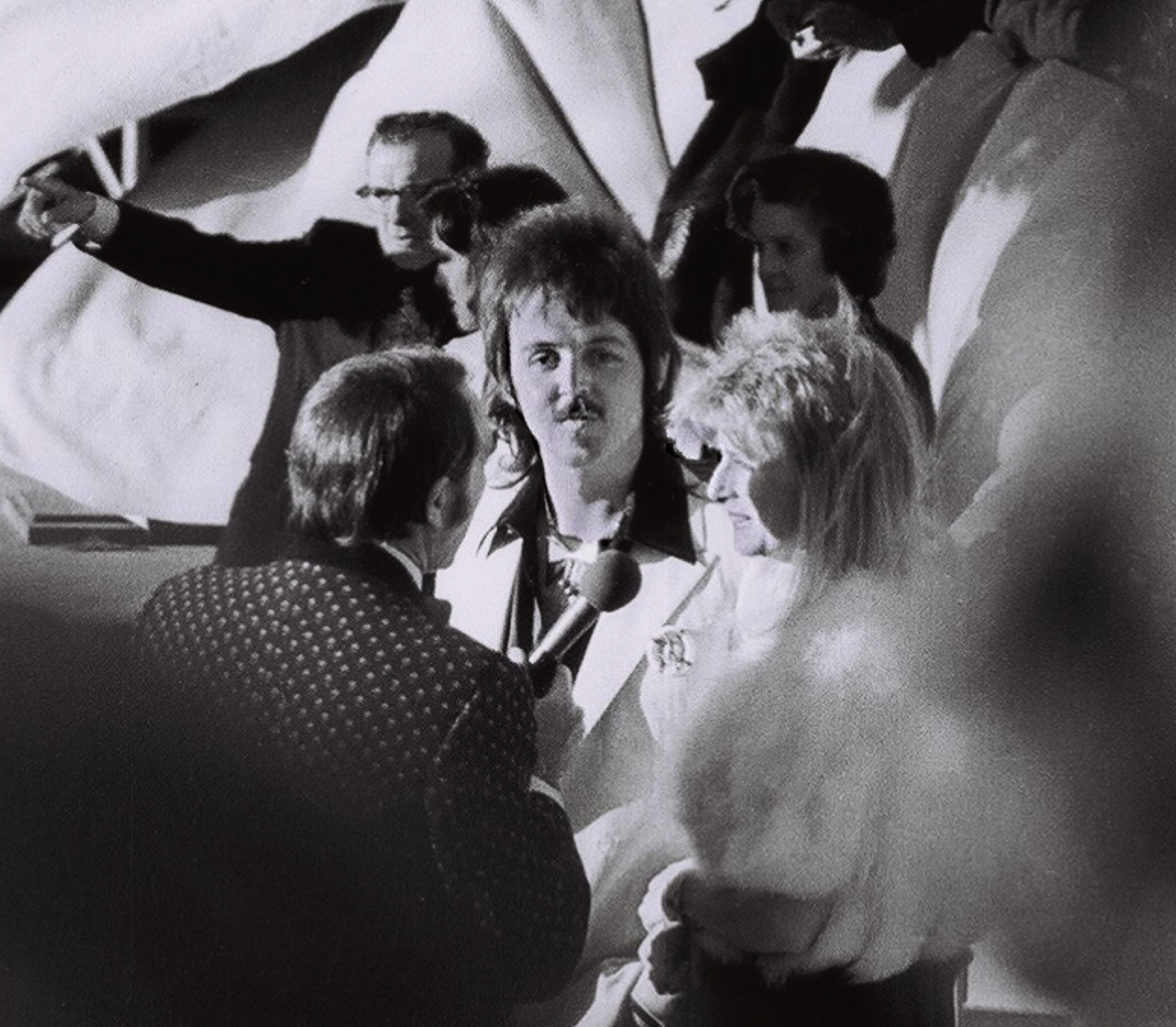
Paul and Linda McCartney at the Academy Awards at the Dorothy Chandler Pavilion 2 April 1974

Near the end of the Red Rose Speedway sessions, in October 1972, Wings recorded the theme song to the James Bond film Live and Let Die, which reunited McCartney with Beatles producer/arranger George Martin. Issued as a non-album single in mid-1973, "Live and Let Die" became a worldwide hit and has remained a highlight of McCartney's post-Wings concert performances. That same year, McCartney and Wings filmed a TV special, the critically maligned James Paul McCartney, which featured footage of the group performing in outdoor settings and in front of a studio audience.

After a successful British tour in May–June 1973, Wings went into rehearsals for their next album. McCullough and Seiwell abruptly left the band in August, however, at the end of rehearsals. Both musicians were disenchanted with the group's musical direction and Linda's inclusion; McCullough also objected to McCartney's domineering attitude towards him as a guitar player, while Seiwell had long felt aggrieved at the lack of a formalised financial arrangement and his status as a lowly paid sideman.

With the band reduced to a trio, the McCartneys and Laine cut what turned out to be Wings' most successful album, Band on the Run, at EMI's primitive eight-track recording studio in Lagos, Nigeria. The album went to number 1 in both the US and UK and spawned three hit singles: the rockers "Jet" and "Helen Wheels" (originally included only on the US version of the album) and the title track—a suite of movements recalling side two of Abbey Road. It also included "Let Me Roll It" and "No Words", the first Wings song on which Laine received a co-writing credit with the McCartneys. Band on the Run enjoyed a highly favourable response from music critics and restored McCartney's tarnished post-Beatles image.

=== 1974–1978: Venus and Mars to London Town ===
After Band on the Run, Jimmy McCulloch, former lead guitarist in Thunderclap Newman and Stone the Crows, joined the band. The first Wings project with McCulloch was McGear, a 1974 collaboration between Paul and his younger brother Mike McGear, with session musician Gerry Conway playing drums. Warner Bros. Records chose not to play up the "Wings" angle in its marketing for McGear, and the album sold poorly. However, the sessions also generated a single credited to McGear's group the Scaffold, "Liverpool Lou", which became a top-10 hit in the UK. Shortly thereafter, Geoff Britton joined Wings on drums, and the first recording session with this full line-up was held in Nashville, where the band stayed at the farm of songwriter Curly Putman Jr. The trip was immortalised in the 1974 non-album single "Junior's Farm", backed with a straight country track entitled "Sally G", the group's last release on Apple Records. In a rare occurrence for this era, both sides of the single separately reached the Billboard Top 20 in the US.

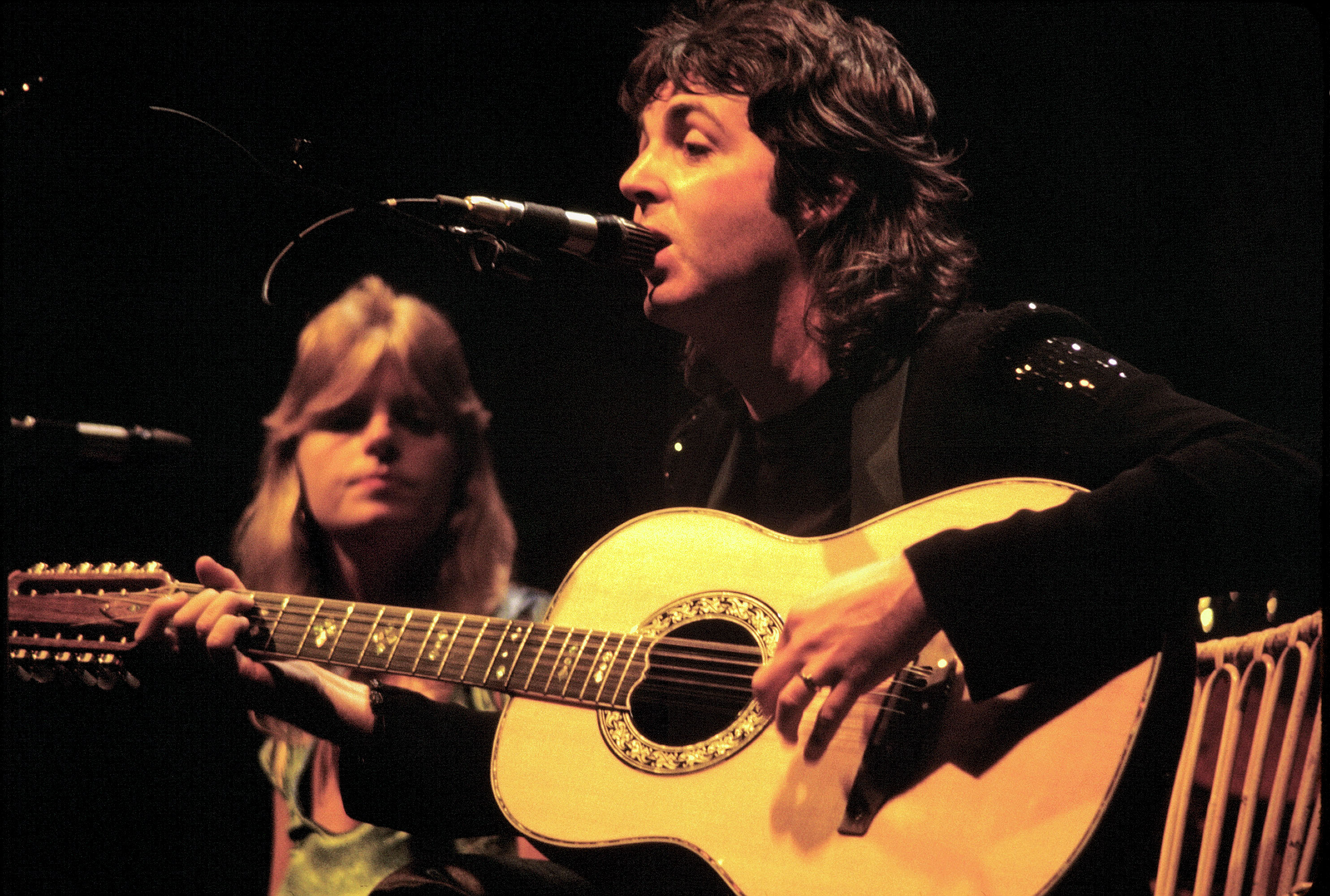
Paul McCartney with Linda McCartney in 1976

Wings began recording sessions for their next album in London in November 1974, then moved to New Orleans to complete Venus and Mars (1975), the first release from the group on Capitol Records. The album topped the charts and contained the US number 1 single "Listen to What the Man Said", which also featured Dave Mason, formerly of Traffic, on guitar and Tom Scott on saxophone. When the Venus and Mars recording sessions moved to New Orleans, Britton quit Wings and was replaced by Joe English who won the job at a secret audition before McCartney. In late 1975 Wings embarked on the Wings Over the World tour, following a postponement to allow McCulloch to recuperate from a hand fracture. Starting in Bristol, the tour took them to Australia (November), Europe (March 1976), the US (May/June), and Europe again (September), before ending in a four-night grand finale at London's Wembley Empire Pool. For this tour, added to Wings' stage act was a horn section consisting of Tony Dorsey, Howie Casey, Thaddeus Richard and Steve Howard, on saxes, brass and percussion.

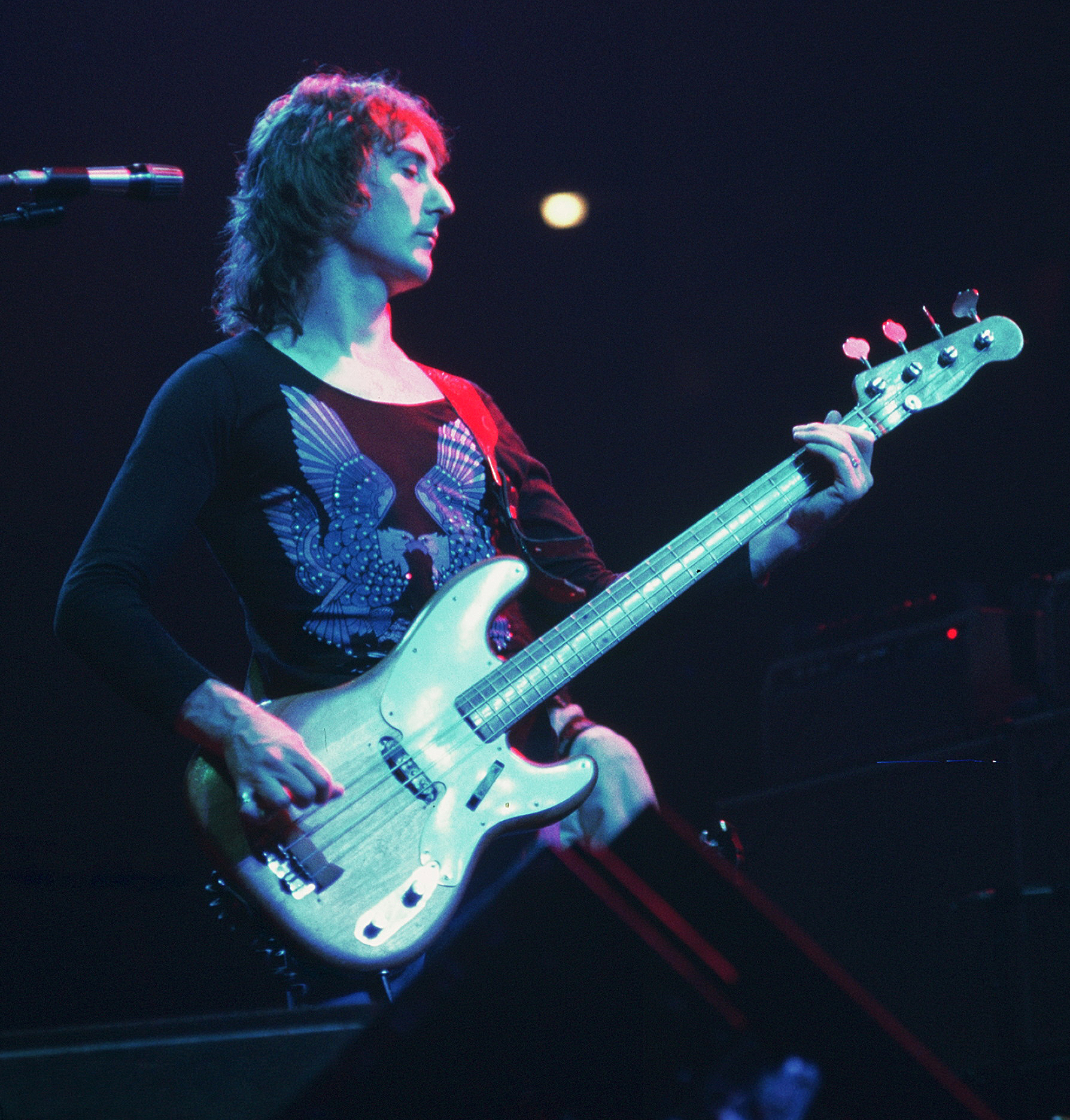
Denny Laine during the 1976 tour

In between sections of the tour, Wings recorded Wings at the Speed of Sound, which was released at the end of March 1976, just prior to the US leg of the world tour. It represented a departure from the previous Wings template in that each of the five members of the band (including English) sang lead on at least one song. However, the two singles, "Silly Love Songs" and "Let 'Em In" (the former a US number one), were both sung by Paul. Four of the album tracks were played in the 1976 portion of the tour, which also included five Beatles songs. One of the Seattle concerts from the American leg of the 1975–76 world tour was filmed and later released as the concert feature Rockshow (1980). The tour's American leg, which included concerts at Madison Square Garden and the Boston Garden, spawned a triple live album, Wings over America (1976), which became the fifth consecutive Wings album to reach number 1 in the US. From this album came a single release of the live version of "Maybe I'm Amazed" originally from the McCartney album. The single's flipside was "Soily", a previously unreleased rocker that was often used as a closer for the concerts.

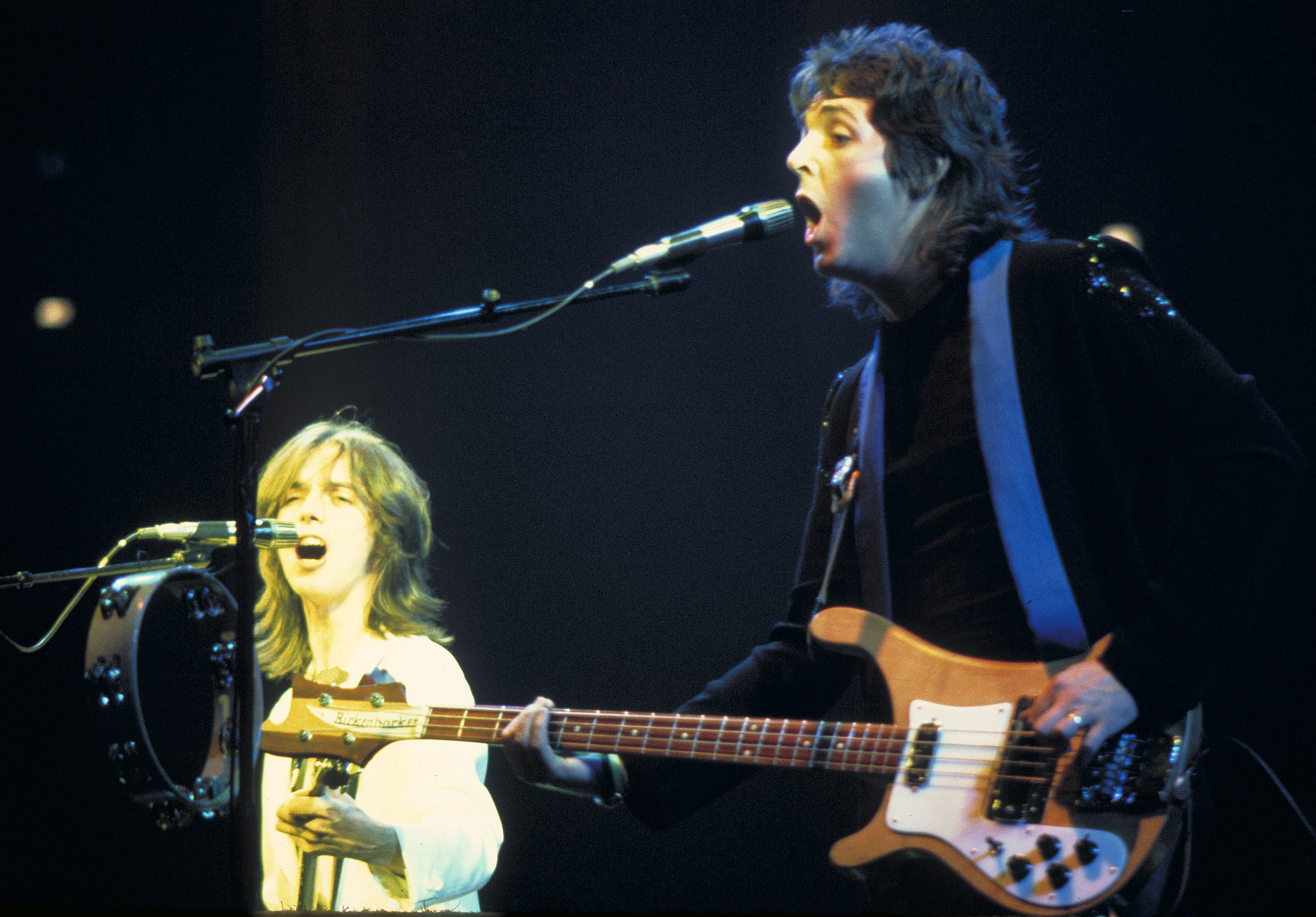
Jimmy McCulloch (left) and Paul McCartney during the 1976 Wings Over the World tour

After the tour, and following the release of "Maybe I'm Amazed" in early 1977, Wings took a break. Later in the year, the band started recording their next album in the Virgin Islands, but the sessions were interrupted by Linda's pregnancy and then by the departures of both McCulloch and English. McCulloch, who joined Small Faces, died of morphine and alcohol poisoning in 1979. English joined Chuck Leavell's band Sea Level and later founded the Christian-oriented Joe English Band.

Undeterred by their departure, Wings released the already-completed McCartney–Laine ballad "Mull of Kintyre", an ode to the Scottish coastal region where McCartney had made his home in the early 1970s. Its broad appeal was maximised by a pre-Christmas release. It became an international hit, dominating the charts in Britain (where it was Wings' only number 1 single), Australia and many other countries over the Christmas/New Year period. Ultimately, it became the first single to exceed sales of 2 million in the UK, eclipsing the previous all-time best-seller (the Beatles' "She Loves You"), and remains one of the biggest-selling UK singles of all time. However, it was not a success in the US, where the B-side "Girls School" received most of the airplay but barely reached the top 40.

The core trio of Wings then released the album London Town in 1978. Though only the remaining trio are pictured on the sleeve, much of the album included McCulloch and English, having been recorded before their departures. Laine, however, remained and was co-credited on five of the tracks, including the title song. It was a commercial success, although it became the first Wings album since Wild Life not to reach number 1 in the US (peaking at number 2). London Town featured a markedly softer-rock, synth-based sound than previous Wings albums. "With a Little Luck" reached number 1 in the US and number 5 in the UK, but "I've Had Enough" and "London Town" were commercial disappointments in both countries.

=== 1978–1981: Back to the Egg and break-up ===
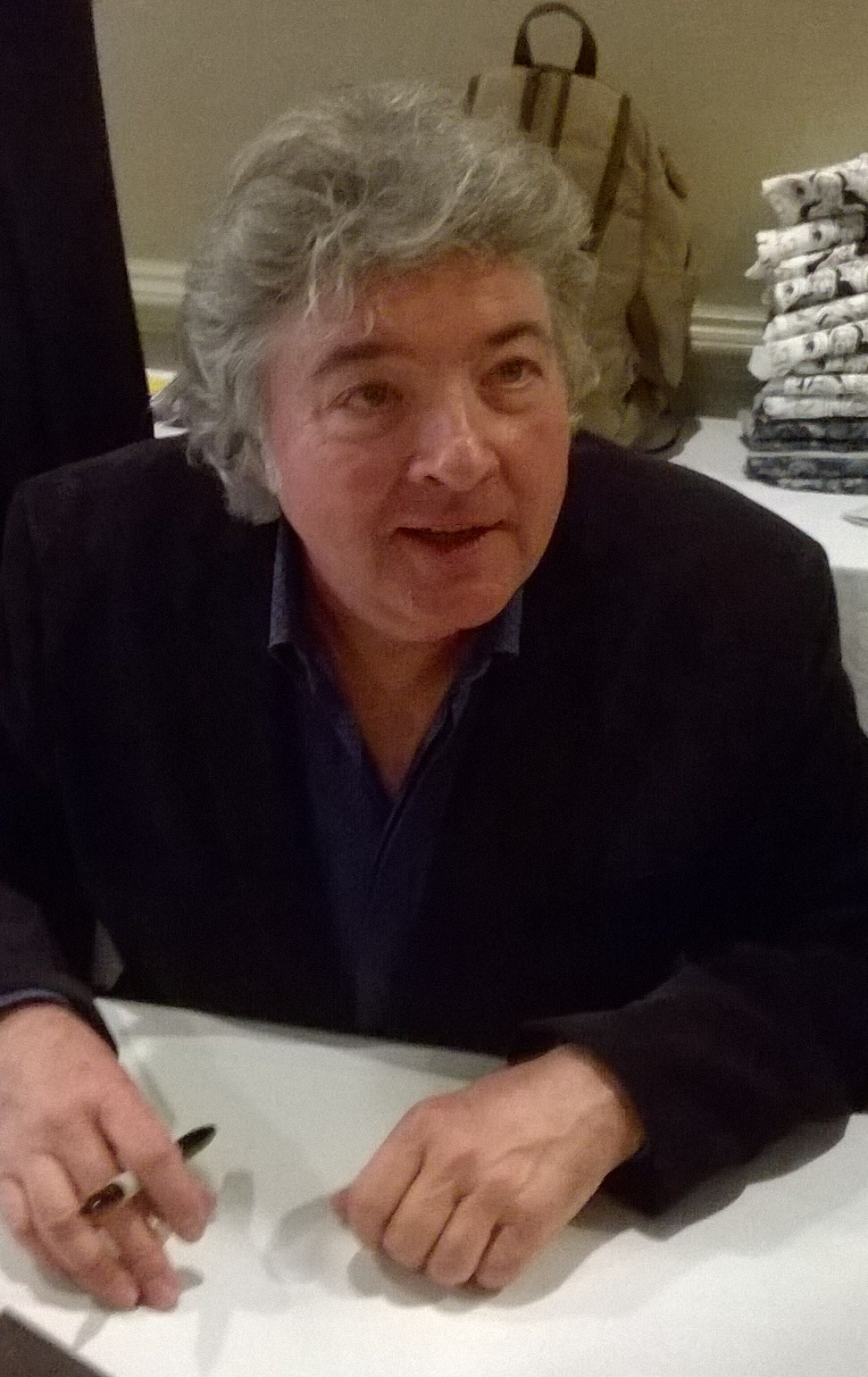
Steve Holley, the group's last drummer

Later in 1978, lead guitarist Laurence Juber and drummer Steve Holley joined the band, restoring Wings to touring strength. In 1979, McCartney signed a new record contract, leaving Capitol, the company he had been with in the US and Canada since he was a Beatle, and joining Columbia Records, while remaining with Parlophone in the rest of the world. Influenced by the punk and new wave scenes, Wings abandoned its mellow touch and hired Chris Thomas to help in the production process. The result was a somewhat less polished sound. This new version of Wings released the disco-oriented single "Goodnight Tonight", backed by "Daytime Nighttime Suffering", which reached the top 5 in both the US and UK. However, the subsequent album Back to the Egg was not favourably received by critics and although it went platinum in the US, sales were disappointing in comparison to its immediate predecessors. It contained the Grammy-winning song "Rockestra Theme", the result of an October 1978 superstar session with members of Wings, the Who, Led Zeppelin, and Pink Floyd, among others. Three singles, "Old Siam, Sir" (UK only), "Getting Closer", and "Arrow Through Me" (US only), were culled from the album, but performed poorly on the charts. During much of 1979, Wings were inactive as McCartney worked on a new solo album (McCartney II) without the band.

In November and December 1979, Wings toured the UK, once again adding the horns and brass section consisting of Tony Dorsey, Howie Casey, Thaddeus Richard, and Steve Howard. This tour climaxed with the Concerts for the People of Kampuchea, a massive "Rockestra" all-star collection of musicians in London in aid of UNICEF and Kampuchean refugees. Also during this tour, a live version of the McCartney II track "Coming Up" was recorded in Glasgow and became Wings' sixth US number one hit the following year.

McCartney and his family arrived in Japan on 16 January 1980 for a planned 11-date Wings' concert tour. McCartney was arrested immediately upon arriving at New Tokyo Airport for possession of 219 grams (7.7 ounces) of marijuana (with an estimated street value of 600,000 yen) hidden in his luggage. The arrest put the tour in jeopardy and Wings' music was immediately banned from all television and radio stations across Japan. Wings' Japanese promoters claimed that almost 100,000 tickets for the concerts had been sold, representing a possible loss of well over 100 million yen. The promoters had no option but to cancel all of the tour dates the day after McCartney's arrest. The other band members of Wings, except Linda, left Japan and returned to England on 21 January 1980. McCartney spent ten days in jail before being released without charge on 25 January 1980 and deported. After returning to England, McCartney decided to release his solo album McCartney II and plans for a US tour were subsequently dropped. Meanwhile, Denny Laine released the single "Japanese Tears" and formed the short-lived Denny Laine Band with Steve Holley and released a solo album Japanese Tears that December.

By 1980, McCartney was growing weary of maintaining Wings, and his personal and professional aspirations began to diverge from the group. The McCartneys now had three school-age children and had moved out of London to the countryside of East Sussex, desiring that their children have a normal upbringing. Musically, McCartney was dissatisfied by the band's performances during the 1979 UK tour, and when rehearsals for the next album began in October, it was apparent his latest songs were not a good fit for the band. Consequently, he and George Martin, who would be producing the album, decided not to use Wings for recording. Instead, top session musicians and guest artists were brought in to make the best possible album. In November 1980, Holley and Juber were told they would not be needed for the new album and other than sessions in January 1981 to finish work on the Cold Cuts album of previously unreleased tracks, no further activities were scheduled for Wings. Juber has said he could see the "writing on the wall" regarding Wings' future at that point and moved to New York to continue his career there.

Laine stayed on for the Tug of War sessions in Montserrat in February 1981 but his relationship with McCartney had become strained over business and personal matters. Laine had begun to feel that he was not being adequately compensated for his role in Wings, and was particularly bitter that he was employed as a contract writer on "Mull of Kintyre", a song he co-wrote with McCartney. He had been paid a flat fee for his contributions so when the song became a hit, he did not share in the royalties. (Note: After splitting with McCartney in 1981, Laine was paid an additional £135,000 ($255,000 in 1981) for "Mull of Kintyre".) Laine was also upset with McCartney over his drug arrest in Japan, which had created a loss of extra income from the tour as well as putting future tour plans in doubt. Laine's marriage was also troubled, and his wife and the McCartneys did not get along well. In April 1981, Laine announced he was leaving Wings, citing the lack of tour plans as the reason. While Laine's departure effectively ended the band, a spokesman for McCartney said that Wings still continued as an active concept. McCartney finally acknowledged the band no longer existed while promoting the release of Tug of War in 1982.

=== The Country Hams ===
The Country Hams was a pseudonym used by the group for the release of the single "Walking in the Park with Eloise" in 1974, a song written years before by Paul's father James. Wings (with guest musicians Chet Atkins and Floyd Cramer) recorded it during the sessions for "Junior's Farm".

=== Suzy and the Red Stripes ===
Suzy and the Red Stripes was a pseudonym used by the group for the release of the Linda McCartney and Wings single "Seaside Woman" in 1977. It was written and sung by Linda McCartney. It was the only release by Wings under that name. Linda said that the "Suzy and the Red Stripes" pseudonym came about because she had been called "Suzi" in Jamaica because of "a fantastic reggae version of 'Suzi Q'", and Red Stripe is Jamaica's leading brand of beer.

=== Partial reunions ===
In March 1997, Denny Laine, Laurence Juber and Steve Holley did an impromptu Wings reunion at a Beatlefest convention in East Rutherford, New Jersey. This was not a planned event, and no further reunions were intended. However, ten years later, in July 2007, Laine, Juber and Denny Seiwell reunited for one show at a Beatlefest (renamed Fest for Beatles Fans) convention in Las Vegas. Among other songs, they performed "Band on the Run", "Mull of Kintyre" and "Go Now". Laine and Seiwell appeared again at the Fest for Beatles Fans in Secaucus, New Jersey, in March 2010 and were joined by Juber at the Fest in Chicago in August 2010.

Laine, Juber and Seiwell performed together at the Fest for Beatles Fans in Los Angeles, California, in October 2014; the setlist included "Hi, Hi, Hi", "Live and Let Die" and "Rockestra Theme". In August 2017, the trio performed at the festival once again, this time joined by drummer Steve Holley.

Laine, Juber, Seiwell and Holley performed together in January 2018 at Grand Oak Live, a music venue in Upland, California, headlining an event called Imagine Something Yesterday.

Laine, Juber and Holley performed again in March 2019 at the Fest for Beatles Fans in Jersey City, New Jersey performing songs from the band's final album Back to the Egg.

== Legacy ==
Wings had twelve top-10 singles (including one number one) in the UK and fourteen top 10 singles (including six number ones) in the US. All 23 singles released by Wings reached the US top 40, and one two-sided hit, "Junior's Farm"/"Sally G", reached the top 40 with each side. Of the nine albums released by Wings, all went top 10 in either the UK or the US, with five consecutive albums topping the US charts. Paul McCartney was unquestionably Wings' leader and dominant creative force, but Denny Laine, Jimmy McCulloch, and Linda McCartney all contributed a little in songwriting, and Laine, McCulloch, Joe English, and Linda McCartney all performed a few lead vocals.

The success of Wings was a vindication for McCartney. His first few post-Beatles albums were highly criticized and often dismissed by critics as "lightweight" next to the more serious nature of his former bandmates' solo output. But by the mid-1970s, the solo careers of the other three former Beatles were in varying degrees of decline, with John Lennon putting his career on hold in 1975 for the first five years of his son Sean's life. A year later, George Harrison had all but retired from live performances, with his new releases failing to match the success of his initial solo output. Ringo Starr was living in Los Angeles and was writing and recording, but as a solo artist had not been performing onstage other than rare guest appearances. Meanwhile, Wings continued to tour regularly and enjoy much commercial success. According to author Robert Rosen, by 1980, Lennon was envious enough of McCartney's continuing success to make his re-emergence on the music scene.

One of the criticisms of Wings was that the other members were little more than sidemen backing up a solo McCartney. Guitarist Henry McCullough quit the band because he grew tired of being told by McCartney exactly what to play, and said that Wings were never a "real band". On the other hand, other former members of Wings such as Joe English and Laurence Juber have said that they were allowed a degree of creative freedom. In an interview, Juber, Wings' third lead guitarist, said, "I was a sideman, but the job assignment very much included considering myself a part of the band ... In all its incarnations Wings sounded like a band, not like a solo McCartney project and I think that reflects well not only on Paul's ability to share in the creative process, but also on the importance of Denny and Linda's contributions, too. The other players brought their own personalities to the scene."

In addition to its own output, Wings recorded several songs that were released through various outlets both before and after the band's break-up. Denny Laine's 1977 solo album Holly Days was a joint effort by Laine with Paul and Linda McCartney; three songs on Laine's 1980 solo album Japanese Tears were performed by Wings with Laine on lead vocals; Laine also contributed to several songs on Paul McCartney's 1982 and 1983 solo albums Tug of War and Pipes of Peace, respectively. Juber's instrumental "Maisie"—which was backed by members of Wings—appeared on his solo album Standard Time. The McCartneys and Laine contributed backing vocals to George Harrison's 1981 tribute to John Lennon, "All Those Years Ago". Linda McCartney continued to tour and record with her husband up until her death in 1998, after which a compilation of her songs entitled Wide Prairie was released that featured seven Wings songs written or co-written by her. Wings also backed Paul's brother Mike McGear on the McGear album, as well as McGear's band the Scaffold on the single "Liverpool Lou" and its B-side "Ten Years After on Strawberry Jam". Paul McCartney also used three unreleased Wings songs as B-sides of his solo singles several years after Wings' break-up.

Wings' 1977 single "Mull of Kintyre"/"Girls School" is still the biggest-selling non-charity single in the UK (although Queen's "Bohemian Rhapsody" sold more, its sales include a reissue in aid of the Terrence Higgins Trust), and it ranked fourth in the official list of all-time best-selling singles in the UK issued in 2002.

In the 1986 satirical song "I've Never Met a Nice South African" from the British TV series Spitting Image, the narrator mentions as part of the list of unlikely things that they have witnessed that they have heard a decent song from Paul McCartney's Wings.

In 2001, Wingspan: Hits and History was released, a project spanning an album and a television special retrospective. Though ostensibly a Wings project, the album was a compilation of both Wings and McCartney solo material, and was credited to Paul McCartney.

Founding member Denny Laine died on 5 December 2023, at the age of 79.

In 2024, One Hand Clapping, a live-in-studio album recorded in 1974, was finally released.

== Personnel ==
During its ten-year lifespan, Wings underwent numerous personnel changes, including twice being reduced to its core McCartney–McCartney–Laine trio.

=== Members ===
- Paul McCartney – lead vocals, bass, guitars, piano, keyboards, drums (1971–1981)
- Linda McCartney – vocals, keyboards, piano, percussion (1971–1981; died 1998)
- Denny Laine – vocals, guitars, bass, piano, harmonica (1971–1981; died 2023)
- Denny Seiwell – drums, percussion, trumpet (1971–1973)
- Henry McCullough – guitar, backing vocals, percussion (1972–1973; died 2016)
- Jimmy McCulloch – guitar, vocals, bass (1974–1977; died 1979)
- Geoff Britton – drums, percussion (1974–1975)
- Joe English – drums, percussion, vocals (1975–1977)
- Laurence Juber – guitar, backing vocals (1978–1981)
- Steve Holley – drums, percussion, backing vocals (1978–1981)

==== Line-ups ====
1971–1972	Paul McCartney – lead vocals, bass, guitars, piano, keyboards; Linda McCartney – keyboards, vocals; Denny Laine – guitars, bass, piano, vocals; Denny Seiwell – drums, percussion
1972–1973	Paul McCartney – lead vocals, bass, guitars, piano, keyboards; Linda McCartney – keyboards, vocals; Denny Laine – guitars, bass, piano, harmonica, vocals; Henry McCullough – guitars, drums, vocals; Denny Seiwell – drums, percussion, trumpet
1973–1974	Paul McCartney – lead vocals, bass, guitars, piano, keyboards, drums; Linda McCartney – keyboards, vocals; Denny Laine – guitars, bass, piano, vocals
1974–1975	Paul McCartney – lead vocals, bass, guitars, piano, keyboards; Linda McCartney – keyboards, vocals; Denny Laine – guitars, bass, piano, vocals; Jimmy McCulloch – guitars, vocals; Geoff Britton – drums, percussion
1975–1977	Paul McCartney – lead vocals, bass, guitars, piano, keyboards; Linda McCartney – keyboards, vocals; Denny Laine – guitars, bass, piano, harmonica, vocals; Jimmy McCulloch – guitars, bass, vocals; Joe English – drums, percussion, vocals
1977–1978	Paul McCartney – lead vocals, bass, guitars, piano, keyboards, drums; Linda McCartney – keyboards, vocals; Denny Laine – guitars, bass, piano, vocals
1978–1981	Paul McCartney – lead vocals, bass, guitars, piano, keyboards; Linda McCartney – keyboards, vocals; Denny Laine – guitars, bass, piano, vocals; Laurence Juber – guitars, vocals; Steve Holley – drums, percussion, vocals

== Discography ==
=== Studio albums ===
- Wild Life (1971)
- Red Rose Speedway (1973)
- Band on the Run (1973)
- Venus and Mars (1975)
- Wings at the Speed of Sound (1976)
- London Town (1978)
- Back to the Egg (1979)

=== Related studio albums ===
- McGear (credited to Mike McGear) (1974)
- Holly Days (credited to Denny Laine) (1977)

=== Live albums ===
- Wings over America (1976)
- Wings over Europe (2018)
- One Hand Clapping (2024) (live-in-studio album)

=== Compilation albums ===
- Wings Greatest (1978)
- Wings (2025)

=== Unreleased compilation album ===
- Cold Cuts

== Tours ==
Wings played five concert tours during their ten-year existence:

- Wings University Tour – 11 shows in the UK, 1972
- Wings Over Europe Tour – 25 shows, 1972
- Wings 1973 United Kingdom Tour – 21 shows, 1973
- Wings Over the World Tour – 66 shows, 1975–1976
- Wings 1979 United Kingdom Tour – 20 shows, 1979

== Awards ==
Music Week Award

Year	Award	Work	Recipient	Result
1977	Music Weeks top single	"Mull of Kintyre"	Wings	Won

Yugoton Award

Year	Award	Work	Recipient	Result
1976	Gold LP for successful sales of their albums in Yugoslavia	McCartney, Ram, Wild Life, Red Rose Speedway, Band on the Run, Venus and Mars, Wings at the Speed of Sound	Paul McCartney and Wings	Won

Brit Award

Year	Award	Work	Recipient	Result
2010	The BRITs Hits 30	"Live and Let Die"	Paul McCartney and Wings	Nominated

American Music Award

Year	Award	Work	Recipient	Result
1974	Favorite Pop/Rock Band/Duo/Group	"Live and Let Die"	Paul McCartney and Wings	Nominated

Academy Award

Year	Award	Work	Recipient	Result
1974	Best Original Song	"Live and Let Die"	Paul McCartney and Linda McCartney	Nominated

Million-Air Award

Year	Award	Work	Recipient	Result
2012	Over 4 million performances	"Live and Let Die"	Paul McCartney	Won

The Guinness Book of Records

Year	Award	Work	Recipient	Result
1979	Most successful and honoured composer and musician in popular music history	–	Paul McCartney	Won

Q Award

Year	Award	Work	Recipient	Result
2010	Classic Album	Band on the Run	Paul McCartney and Wings	Won

RIAA award

Year	Award	Recipient	Result
1976	Top Male Vocalist of the Year	Paul McCartney	Won

NME Award

Year	Award	Recipient	Result
1974	Best bass guitarist	Paul McCartney	Won
1976	Best bass guitarist	Paul McCartney	Won

Capitol Radio Music Award

Year	Award	Work	Recipient	Result
1977	Best Single	"Mull of Kintyre"	Wings	Won
1977	Best Live Show in London	1976 Wembley performances	Paul McCartney and Wings	Won

Daily Mirror Readers Award

Year	Award	Recipient	Result
1977	Best Male Group Singer	Paul McCartney	Won
1977	Best Rock Group	Paul McCartney and Wings	Won
1977	Best Pop Group	Paul McCartney and Wings	Won
1979	Outstanding Music Personality	Paul McCartney	Won

Ivor Novello Award

Year	Award	Work	Recipient	Result
1978	Best Pop Song	"Mull of Kintyre"	Wings	Nominated
1978	Best Selling A-side	"Mull of Kintyre"	Wings	Won
1980	Outstanding Services to British Music	–	Paul McCartney	Won

Juno Award (Canadian music awards) and nominations

Year	Award	Work	Recipient	Result
1975	International Album of the Year	Band on the Run	Paul McCartney and Wings	Won
1975	Best Selling Single	"Band on the Run"	Paul McCartney and Wings	Nominated
1976	International Album of the Year	Venus and Mars	Wings	Nominated
1977	International Album of the Year	Wings over America	Wings	Nominated

Grammy Award and nominations

Year	Award	Work	With	Result
1974	Best Arrangement Accompanying Vocalist(s)	"Live and Let Die"	George Martin	Won
1974	Best Original Score Written for a Motion Picture	"Live and Let Die"	Paul McCartney, Linda McCartney, George Martin	Nominated
1974	Best Pop Vocal Performance by a Duo, Group or Chorus	"Live and Let Die"	Paul McCartney and Wings	Nominated
1975	Best Pop Vocal Performance by a Duo, Group or Chorus	"Band on the Run"	Paul McCartney and Wings	Won
1975	Best Engineered Recording, Non-Classical	Band on the Run	Geoff E. Emerick	Won
1975	Album of the Year	Band on the Run	Paul McCartney and Wings	Nominated
1977	Best Arrangement Accompanying Vocalist(s)	"Let 'Em In"	Wings	Nominated
1978	Best Album Package	Wings over America	Wings	Nominated
1980	Best Rock Instrumental Performance	"Rockestra Theme"	Wings	Won
1981	Best Rock Vocal Performance, Male	"Coming Up"	Paul McCartney	Nominated
2012	Best Historical Album	Band on the Run	Paul McCartney, Sam Okell, Steve Rooke	Won
2013	Grammy Hall of Fame Award	Band on the Run	Paul McCartney and Wings	Inducted
2014	Best Boxed or Special Limited Edition Package	Wings over America	Simon Earith, James Musgrave	Won
