= Man on the Run (soundtrack) =

2026 soundtrack and compilation album

Man on the Run (Music from the Motion Picture Soundtrack)

Soundtrack album / compilation album by Paul McCartney
- Released: 27 February 2026
- Recorded: 1969–1979
- Genre: Rock
- Length: 49:51
- Labels: UMe; Capitol
- Producers: Paul McCartney; Linda McCartney (Ram tracks); Chris Thomas ("Arrow Through Me")

Paul McCartney chronology
Wings (2025)	Man on the Run (Music from the Motion Picture Soundtrack) (2026)	The Boys of Dungeon Lane (2026)

Man on the Run (Music from the Motion Picture Soundtrack) is the third soundtrack and sixth compilation album by English musician Paul McCartney, mostly featuring music recorded with his post-Beatles band Wings. It features three previously unreleased recordings. The album was released on 27 February 2026, and accompanies the documentary Man on the Run, which focuses on McCartney's life in the 1970s.

== Background and contents ==
In early 2023, McCartney announced a documentary titled Man on the Run, which would be focused on McCartney's life in the 1970s after the breakup of the Beatles. The soundtrack includes recordings from the 1970s, such as a demo of "Silly Love Songs". It also features, for the first time, an official release of "Gotta Sing Gotta Dance", from the James Paul McCartney television special.

== Release and promotion ==
The soundtrack was released on 27 February 2026, the same day of the documentary's release onto Amazon Prime Video. A rough mix of "Arrow Through Me" and "Live and Let Die" from Rockshow were made available on Amazon Music before the soundtrack's release. A limited edition "New York Taxi Yellow" coloured vinyl is being exclusively sold through Third Man Records.

== Critical reception ==
Professional ratings
Review scores
Source	Rating
Spill Magazine	5/5 stars

In a Spill Magazine review, Aaron Badgley wrote that "The little treasures in between the huge hits gives the listener a glimpse into McCartney's diverse musical tastes and his ability to not only follow his muse but succeed in whatever he wanted to accomplish." He concluded that "It is impossible to squeeze the entire decade into 45 minutes, and of course, some may question omissions. But rather than focus on what is not here, focus on the stunning, creative, and brilliant music that is available. Man on the Run – Music from the Motion Picture Soundtrack is perfection."

== Track listing ==
According to Rock Cellar Magazine:

Man on the Run (Music from the Motion Picture Soundtrack) track listing
No.	Title	Original release	Length
1.	"Silly Love Songs" (demo)	from the Archive Collection edition of Wings at the Speed of Sound	2:46
2.	"That Would Be Something"	2011 remaster, from the Archive Collection edition of McCartney	2:39
3.	"Long Haired Lady"	2012 remaster, from the Archive Collection edition of Ram	6:06
4.	"Too Many People"	2012 remaster, from the Archive Collection edition of Ram	4:11
5.	"Big Barn Bed"	2018 remaster, from the Archive Collection edition of Red Rose Speedway	3:51
6.	"Gotta Sing Gotta Dance"	previously unreleased in audio format – originally from the James Paul McCartney TV special	4:05
7.	"Live and Let Die"	previously unreleased in audio format – originally from the Rockshow concert film	3:54
8.	"Band on the Run"	2011 remaster, from the Archive Collection edition of Band on the Run	5:14
9.	"Arrow Through Me" (rough mix)	previously unreleased version – originally from Back to the Egg	3:37
10.	"Mull of Kintyre"	2016 remaster, from the compilation Pure McCartney	4:46
11.	"Coming Up"	2011 remaster, from the Archive Collection edition of McCartney II	3:52
12.	"Let Me Roll It"	2010 remaster, from the Archive Collection edition of Band on the Run	4:50

== Charts ==
Chart performance for Man on the Run (Music from the Motion Picture Soundtrack)
Chart (2026)	Peak position
Austrian Albums (Ö3 Austria)	18
Belgian Albums (Ultratop Flanders)	19
Belgian Albums (Ultratop Wallonia)	24
Dutch Albums (Album Top 100)	38
French Albums (SNEP)	140
French Rock & Metal Albums (SNEP)	7
German Albums (Offizielle Top 100)	19
German Rock & Metal Albums (Offizielle Top 100)	8
Japanese Albums (Oricon)	39
Japanese Rock Albums (Oricon)	3
Japanese Top Albums Sales (Billboard Japan)	36
Scottish Albums (Official Charts)	7
Swedish Physical Albums (Sverigetopplistan)	16
Swiss Albums (Schweizer Hitparade)	33
UK Albums (Official Charts)	35
UK Soundtrack Albums (Official Charts)	1
US Indie Store Album Sales (Billboard)	20
US Soundtrack Albums (Billboard)	5
US Top Album Sales (Billboard)	13
