= Loup (1st Indian on the Moon) =

Instrumental by Paul McCartney and Wings

from the album Red Rose Speedway
- Released: 5 May 1973
- Recorded: 15-17 March 1972
- Studio: Olympic Sound Studios
- Genre: Experimental
- Length: 4:23
- Label: Apple
- Songwriters: Paul McCartney, Linda McCartney
- Producer: Paul McCartney

"Loup (1st Indian on the Moon)" is a song by the British-American rock band Wings from their second studio album Red Rose Speedway.

== Background ==
Paul McCartney stated on the writing on the song: "Because it's an album track we had a bit more room to manoeuvre. And I think it's the rebellious aspect of Wild Life coming back in. So you’ve got 'My Love', and that's a proper song. You've got some other proper songs on the album. But then we've got something like 'Loup', where it was sort of a bit of fun for us. It's pretty experimental. But we didn't ever play it live, it was just something fun that only existed in the studio." According to Wings in an interview for the British music magazine Melody Maker: "It’s just a thing really, hard to explain about the first Red Indian on the moon called Loup. It’s just a story but you can see through his eyes."

== Reception ==
Ian Peel said that the song was "clearly inspired by the progressive and concept rock scenes that were springing up at the time" Tom Doyle said that it was a "Pink Floyd-inspired instrumental" Ted Montgomery said that "Throughout McCartney's career he's had trouble resisting making self-indulgent and head-scratching decisions about including certain songs on his albums" Rolling Stone called it "electronic patter more gracefully left to such as Pink Floyd and Hawkwind." Flint Journal staff writer Brian L. Steffens called it "the only true 'progressive' track" on Red Rose Speedway and said that "the Wings get behind it and build from an organ to bass, guitars and a good rhythm section."

== Personnel ==
According to Vincent P Benitez Jr except where noted.

- Paul McCartney – chant, guitar, bass guitar, synthesizer
- Linda McCartney – chant, organ
- Denny Laine – chant, electric guitar
- Henry McCullough – chant, electric guitar
- Denny Seiwell – chant, drums

== Sources ==
- Benitez, Vincent P. (2010). The Words and Music of Paul McCartney: The Solo Years. Santa Barbara, Calif: Praeger. ISBN 978-0-313-34969-0.
- Castleman, Harry; Podrazik, Walter J. (1976). All Together Now: The First Complete Beatles Discography 1961–1975. New York, NY: Ballantine Books. ISBN 0-345-25680-8.
- Doyle, Tom (2014). Man on the Run: McCartney in the 1970s. Random House Publishing Group. ISBN 9780804179157.
- Ingham, Chris (2006). The Rough Guide to the Beatles. London: Rough Guides/Penguin. ISBN 978-1-84836-525-4.
- Montgomery, Ted (2020). The Paul McCartney Catalog: A Complete Annotated Discography of Solo Works, 1967-2019. McFarland. ISBN 9781476638010.
- Peel, Ian (2013). The Unknown Paul McCartney: McCartney and the Avant-Garde. Titan. ISBN 978-1-78116-275-0.
