= Man on the Run (disambiguation) =

Man on the Run is a 1949 film directed by Lawrence Huntington.

Man on the Run may also refer to:

- Man on the Run (2023 film), a 2023 documentary on the 1MDB scandal
- Man on the Run (2025 film), a 2025 documentary on Paul McCartney, or its soundtrack
- Man on the Run (album), an album created by the musical band Bush

== See also ==
- Running Man
