= Patrick McDermott (disambiguation) =

Patrick McDermott was an American cameraman who disappeared in June 2005.

Patrick McDermott may also refer to:

- Patrick McDermott (politician) (1859–1942), Irish nationalist politician
- Paddy MacDee (Patrick McDermott, born 1950), English media presenter
- Patrick McDermott (died 1932), Irish murderer, the first man that Albert Pierrepoint helped hang

== See also ==
- Paddy McDermott, musician in Gene and The Gents
