= I Lie Around =

Single by Paul McCartney and Wings
- A-side: "Live and Let Die"
- Released: 1 June 1973
- Recorded: 19 October 1970; November 1972
- Studio: CBS, New York City; EMI, London
- Length: 4:59
- Label: Apple
- Songwriters: Paul McCartney; Linda McCartney
- Producer: Paul McCartney

Paul McCartney and Wings singles chronology
"My Love" (1973)	"I Lie Around" (1973)	"Helen Wheels" (1973)

"I Lie Around" is a song by Paul McCartney and Wings that was released as the B-side to the "Live and Let Die" single in 1973. The first two verses are sung by Wings guitarist Denny Laine, while Paul McCartney sings the third verse.

== Recording ==
The song was recorded in the autumn of 1970 at Columbia Studios in New York, during sessions for Ram. Early mixes had Paul McCartney singing vocals on the entire song. The released version was the first Wings song to feature someone other than McCartney on lead vocals. According to Denny Seiwell, he believed some of the guitar parts were played by Henry McCullough, but also said that "Paul played a lot of the guitar solos too."

== Lyrics and music ==
"I Lie Around" opens with the sound of bleating sheep and "pastoral catcalls".

== Reception ==
Ultimate Classic Rock critic Nick DeRiso rated "I Lie Around" as Denny Laine's 8th best song, calling it a "fun cut about doing absolutely nothing". NME writers Roy Carr and Tony Tyler described it as "playful", with "nice harmonies" and a "forgettable tune."

== Personnel ==
According to the author Luca Perasi:

- Paul McCartney – co-lead vocals, acoustic guitar, piano, autoharp
- Linda McCartney – backing vocals
- David Spinozza – acoustic guitar
- Denny Laine – lead vocals, backing vocals
- Denny Seiwell – drums, percussion, backing vocals
- Henry McCullough – electric guitar
- Unknown musicians – horns, cellos, basses

Note: Perasi is unsure if Paul McCartney played electric guitar.

== Later release ==
Although the song was not placed on an album when it was initially released, it was included as a bonus track on the CD release of Paul McCartney and Wings' 1973 studio album, Red Rose Speedway, when that work became available on compact disc in 1987. It was also included as a bonus track on the remastered version of Red Rose Speedway that was re-released on CD in 1993 as a part of The Paul McCartney Collection, as well as the 2018 Red Rose Speedway (Archive Collection). It was also included on The 7" Singles Box in 2022.
