= Mama's Little Girl =

Single by Paul McCartney & Wings
- A-side: "Put It There"
- Released: 5 February 1990
- Recorded: 14 March 1972
- Studio: Olympic Studios, London
- Genre: Rock, folk rock, psychedelic folk
- Length: 3:41
- Label: Parlophone
- Songwriter: Paul McCartney
- Producers: Paul McCartney; Chris Thomas

Paul McCartney singles chronology
"Figure of Eight" (1990)	"Mama's Little Girl" (1990)	"Birthday" (1990)

"Mama's Little Girl" is a song by Paul McCartney & Wings that was taped in March 1972 during the Red Rose Speedway recording sessions.

== Recording and performance ==
The final mix was made in 1987 at Air Studios in London by McCartney, co-producer Chris Thomas and engineer Bill Price.

McCartney performed "Mama's Little Girl" as part of a medley during the 1973 James Paul McCartney television special, though it was not broadcast.

== Release ==
"Mama's Little Girl" was intended to be included on Cold Cuts, an album of outtakes which was never released.

"Mama's Little Girl" was officially issued:

- In 1990 as the B-side of the "Put It There" single & on the 2 CD Japanese version of the Flowers in the Dirt album.
- In 1993 as a bonus track on the 1993 remastered CD edition of Wings' 1971 Wild Life album.
- In 2018 as part of the Red Rose Speedway Archive Collection.
- In December 2022 as part of Paul McCartney’s The 7" Singles Box collection of 80 singles and 159 tracks.

== Track listing ==
All songs written by Paul McCartney, except "Mama's Little Girl" by Paul and Linda McCartney.

=== 7" and cassette single ===
1. "Put It There" – 2:08
2. "Mama's Little Girl" – 3:40

=== 12" single ===
Side one

1. "Put It There" – 2:08
2. "Mama's Little Girl" – 3:40

Side two

1. "Same Time Next Year" – 3:07

=== CD single ===
1. "Put It There" – 2:08
2. "Mama's Little Girl" – 3:40
3. "Same Time Next Year" – 3:07

== Personnel ==
- Paul McCartney – vocals, acoustic guitar, drums, electric guitar, tambourine
- Linda McCartney – tambourine, backing vocals
- Denny Laine – backing vocals, bass
- Henry McCullough – electric guitar
- Denny Seiwell – African percussion
- Heather McCartney – backing vocals
