= Little Lamb Dragonfly =

Song by Paul McCartney and Wings

from the album Red Rose Speedway
- Released: 30 April 1973
- Genre: Rock, folk rock
- Length: 6:20
- Label: Apple
- Songwriters: Paul McCartney, Linda McCartney
- Producer: Paul McCartney

"Little Lamb Dragonfly" is a song by Paul McCartney and Wings, composed by Paul and Linda McCartney and originally released on the 1973 album Red Rose Speedway. The song was originally recorded during the sessions for McCartney's Ram album in the end of 1970, and thus Hugh McCracken plays guitar on the recording rather than Wings' guitarist Denny Laine. However, Laine did provide backing vocals during the production work for Red Rose Speedway. McCartney originally intended to use the song as part of his Rupert and the Frog Song animated film project. Chip Madinger and Mark Easter noted that drummer Denny Seiwell may have assisted in writing the song, although he was not credited.

== Music and lyrics ==
Music professor Robert Rodriguez described the tune of "Little Lamb Dragonfly" as "quietly haunting" with "the power to move people without their quite understanding why." The song is structured in three sections. The first section is the "Little Lamb" segment, and is in the keys of D major and C major. The middle section contains three verses of the "Dragonfly" part of the song, and is in E major. In between the second and third "Dragonfly" verses, there is a repetition of some of the music from the "Little Lamb" segment, which helps the song maintain unity. Finally, the third section is a short reprise of the "Little Lamb" segment.

There have been several interpretations of what the song is about. One theory is that the song was inspired by the actual death of a sheep on McCartney's farm. McCartney confirmed that this is at least partially correct in an interview in the late 1980s. Another interpretation is that it tells a story of how McCartney became a vegetarian. This interpretation is inspired by lines such as:

My heart is aching for you little lamb
I can help you out but I cannot help you in.

Another interpretation is that the song contains a friendly message to John Lennon, particularly the lines:

Since you've gone I never know
I go on but I miss you so.

However, Rodriguez believes the latter interpretation is unlikely, since other songs McCartney recorded during the Ram sessions seemed to be intended to provoke Lennon's anger. Rather, Rodriguez believes that the lyrics are merely a number of phrases that McCartney strung together because they sounded good together, without intending any particular meaning. Author Vincent Benitez described the lyrics as "childlike" and not as sophisticated as the music, noting that this is excusable given that the song was originally intended to be used in a children's film.

== Critical assessment ==
John Blaney suggests that McCartney's decision to include this song on Red Rose Speedway may have been triggered by his realization that the album project was faltering, but suggests that "Little Lamb Dragonfly" is "too cute for its own good," stating that while "it may be marginally better than much of what Wings recorded for Red Rose Speedway, it still "fails to satisfy." However, Chris Ingham considers this song and the hit single "My Love" two of the songs on which the album works, calling this song "underrated." Rolling Stone critic Lenny Kaye also considered "Little Lamb Dragonfly" one of the best songs on Red Rose Speedway, calling it "soft and sensual," although he notes that the song relies too much on "la-la-las." Billboard called the song one of the best cuts on Red Rose Speedway. Record World similarly called it a "stand out" on the album." Author Ron Schaumburg described the song as "a delightful confection." Richard Burgin of The Boston Globe called the song "truly wistful and lovely." Ultimate Classic Rock critic Nick DeRiso rated it to be Paul McCartney's 12th best song with Wings. NME writers Roy Carr and Tony Tyler praised the "painstaking" production. Music journalist Andrew Wild said that "It floats on a bed of wonderful acoustic-electric guitar playing, has a devastatingly strong lead vocal with occasional bursts of angst and an infectious melody that any songwriter would sell their children to write."

== Personnel ==
According to the author Luca Perasi:

Musicians

- Paul McCartney – vocals, bass, 12-string acoustic guitar, bass, piano, electric guitar
- Linda McCartney – backing vocals, dingers
- Hugh McCracken – 12-string acoustic guitar, electric guitar
- Denny Seiwell – backing vocals, drums, percussion, shaker
- Denny Laine – backing vocals
- Unknown musicians – orchestra (arrangements by George Martin)

Technical

- Paul McCartney – producer
- Tim Geelan – engineer
