= Mundell Music =

Coordinates: 56°12′36″N 3°25′25″W

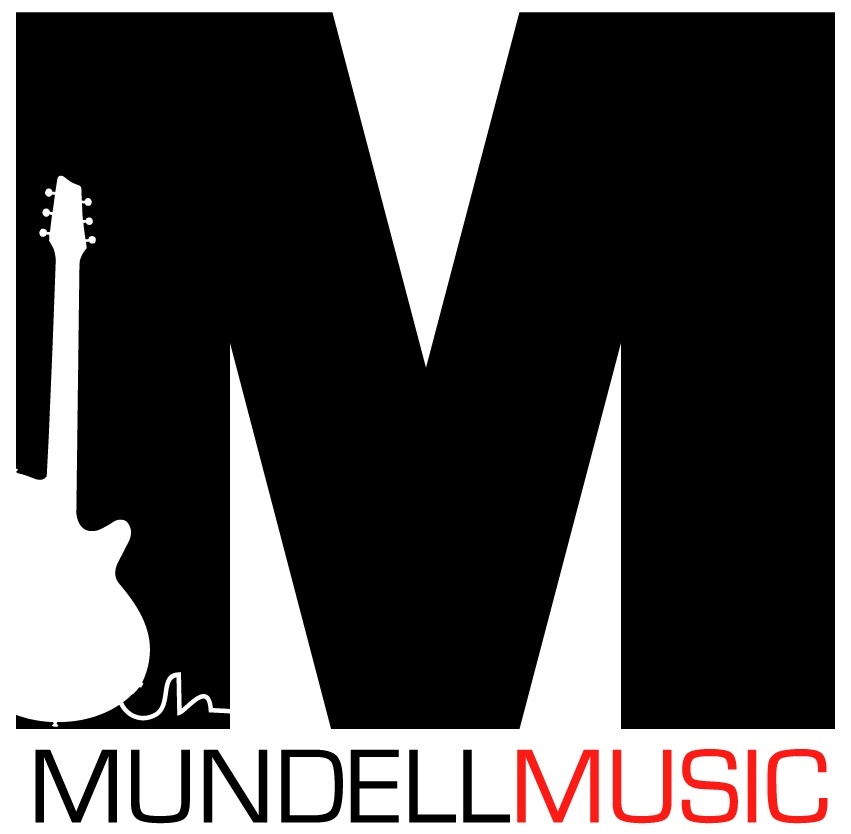
- Location: United Kingdom
- Website: http://mundellmusic.com

Mundell Music is a British concert promotion and production company. It was founded in 1999 by David Mundell.

== History ==
Early in his career, Mundell worked as a manager at hotels across the UK for the now defunct British Transport Hotels, part of the British Rail. He later moved into the private sector. Mundell began promoting music at The Famous Bein Inn (Perthshire, Scotland) before buying it in 1999, to achieve greater control over his promotion ventures. In the first year Dave Kelly was the only artist to play at the venue. Successive artists included Curtis Stigers, Long John Baldry, John Martyn, Gene Parsons, Fairport Convention, John Hammond, Andrew Gold, Tony Joe White, Micky Moody, B. A. Robertson, Albert Lee and Snowy White.

The venue developed a reputation for having a "living room feel" where you could enjoy live music as part of an intimate audience (no more than 60 people) while rubbing shoulders with musicians. One notable occasion came when Big Brother and the Holding Company played for two nights, the only time they would play in Scotland. The venue had a large collection of Fender Stratocaster Guitar Scratchplates that Mundell got signed by many artists (including the Kinks, Free, Status Quo and Eric Clapton.

Henry McCullough recorded a live album, Henry McCullough Band Live FBI.

== Venues ==
=== Famous Bein ===
- Winner - Music Pub of The Year for Scotland 2003
- Finalist - Music Pub of The Year for the UK 2005
- Finalist - Music Pub of The Year for Scotland 2007
- Shortlisted - UK Music Pub of The Year 2008

=== The Inn at Lathones ===
In 2008, Mundell sold the Famous Bein Inn and joined The Inn at Lathones, Largoward, St Andrews, Scotland to launch a music programme. The first artist to play was Peter Tork, followed by Dennis Locorriere, Ian McLagan, Albert Lee, Andy Fairweather Low and the Strawbs.

- Winner - Music Pub of the Year for the UK 2009
- Finalist - Scottish Music Pub of the Year 2009 (SLTN Awards) Finalist - Music Pub of the Year for the UK 2010 (Publican Awards)

=== Fifestock Music Festival ===
Fifestock Music Festival is an annual event that takes place from mid-February to March for around three weeks and has included Denny Laine, Coal Porters, Benny Gallagher and John Jorgenson. Fifestock Music Festival 2010 included Carlene Carter, Mick Taylor, Deborah Bonham and Graham Gouldman.

=== The Green Hotel ===
A purpose-built music venue was completed at The Green Hotel, Kinross, Scotland in October 2010. Music memorabilia adorns the walls. Artists included Steve Gibbons, Ned Evett, Maggie Bell, Henry McCullough, Iain Matthews, Electric Strawbs, Albert Lee & Hogan's Heroes and Steve Forbert.

The Fifestock Music Festival moved Backstage to the Green Hotel from 5 February to 9 March 2011: (Artists included Benny Gallagher, Colin Blunstone Band, Henry McCullough Band, Apart From Rod, Ian McNabb, Gwyn Ashton Band, Paul Lamb & the Kingsnakes, Martin Turner's Wishbone Ash).
