= Gerry Lockran =

British musician (1942–1987)

- Born: Gerald Cranston Frederick Loughran; 19 July 1942; Yavatmal, India
- Died: 17 November 1987 (aged 45)
- Genres: Blues, folk blues
- Instruments: Vocals, acoustic guitars (Martin D-28, Ovation Legend)
- Years active: 1955–1982
- Labels: Decca, Planet, Waverley, Autogram, Line, Polydor, Allied, Planet, BML

Gerry Lockran (19 July 1942 – 17 November 1987) was a British blues singer, songwriter, poet and guitarist.

== Biography ==
=== Early years ===
Gerald Cranston Frederick Loughran was born in the Yavatmal province of the central plains of India. He was the youngest of eight children, having three brothers and four sisters. His forefathers emigrated from Ireland to India around 1800, while his paternal grandmother was of Russian descent. His father Albert Loughran (known as Locky) was a Chief Inspector of Police in the Central Province of India. His mother, Lizzie Cranston, was born of a British father and an Indian mother.

He spent the earliest years of his life growing up on the family farm just outside the town of Damoh, and attended Wynberg Allen Memorial School in Mussoorie, a small village in the Himalayas.

=== Personal life ===
After the death of Gerry's father in 1949, the Loughran family emigrated to south London, England in 1953, following the sale of the family farm. He took up an apprenticeship at Kingston power station, qualifying after five years as an instrument engineer. 1963 saw the death of Gerry's mother, and also his marriage to Bobbi, whom he had first met in 1959. They had two sons, Jason and Jethro.

At the end of 1981 he suffered a heart attack and stroke after which he lost the use of his left hand.

He died on 17 November 1987, after another heart attack.

=== Musical career ===
Lockran discovered skiffle music and for three years played in skiffle group 'The Hornets', at well known venues such as the Skiffle Cellar. Lockran also appeared at the Finsbury Park Empire, London with Wally Whyton and The Vipers.

Towards the end of the 1950s, Lockran met and become lifelong friends with two other young blues musicians: Cliff Aungier, another singer/guitarist and Royd Rivers, who played blues harmonica and 12-string guitar. Lockran and Rivers worked as a duo until 1963, playing live in pubs and clubs throughout Southern England, including the Red Lion in Sutton, Surrey which was one of England's first folk clubs.

In 1961, Lockran acquired the guitar he was most associated with: a Martin D-28 as played by his biggest influence, Big Bill Broonzy. Lockran continued to perform solo throughout the early 1960s, and his live work included tours of France, Germany, Italy and Sicily.

Fellow guitarist John Renbourn has cited Lockran as a key influence on his career: "He was a great player and a great guy who took me under his wing and gave me a platform"

In 1964, he also began an association with Jersey in the Channel Islands, performing extensively on television and radio there. Around April 1965, he changed the spelling of his surname from Loughran to Lockran for stage purposes. His British live schedule at this time included a package tour called 'Kings of the Blues' with Long John Baldry, Alexis Korner and Duffy Power.

On 6 August 1965, Lockran, together with Aungier and Rivers, founded 'Folksville', a folk and blues club at the Half Moon, Putney in west London which remains a thriving music venue. In 1966, Lockran secured a recording contract which resulted in the release of his first album Hold On - I'm Coming!, featuring Danny Thompson, Terry Cox and Ray Warleigh.

He followed this release with Blues Vendetta in 1967, featuring "Jason's Blues", written for his three-year-old son. In 1969, The Essential Gerry Lockran was released, and he also featured on the Blues at Sunrise compilation album with Redd Sullivan, and Dave Travis.

In the early 1970s, his career was managed by Nigel Thomas, who also represented Joe Cocker, The Grease Band, Faces, Chris Stainton and Juicy Lucy. During 1972 and 1973, Lockran toured the U.S., Canada and Europe as part of package of tours featuring these artists. The U.S. and Canadian tour headlined by Joe Cocker lasted three months, and involved 40 concerts at venues including Madison Square Garden in New York and The Forum in Los Angeles. This was followed by a two-month European tour through France, Holland, Italy, Germany and England.

Lockran recorded further albums during this period, Wun (released in 1972),Pinup (released 1973) with Henry McCulloch, Neil Hubbard and others, then Rags to Gladrags (released in 1976) with musicians including Ronnie Wood, Mick Ralphs, Henry McCulloch, Neil Hubbard, Alan Spenner, Philip Chen, Pete Wingfield, Mel Collins, Bruce Rowland and Cliff Aungier.

He then concentrated on touring in Europe, performing in Germany, Austria, Denmark, Holland, Belgium, Switzerland, France and Italy, working with blues harmonica players Matt Walsh and Walter Liniger, Hans Theessink and Ian Hunt, with whom he recorded The Shattered Eye (1979) and Total (1980). Around this time he also started to use the relatively new Ovation Legend guitar. During a tour of Belgium and Holland in 1981, he started suffering heart problems, which culminated in a heart attack and stroke, depriving him of the use of his left hand and effectively ending his career as a professional musician.

Lockran never played guitar again, but turned to photography and poetry. He took promotional portraits of other musicians including Ralph McTell, Cliff Aungier and the psychedelic indie-group Ozric Tentacles which featured Gerry's nephew, Paul Hankin on percussion. In 1983, a private collection of his poems, Smiles and Tears was privately published by Waddling Duck Press.

== Discography ==
- Hold On - I'm Coming! (1966)
- Blues Vendetta (1967)
- The Essential Gerry Lockran (1969)
- Blues at Sunrise - with Redd Sullivan and Dave Travis (1969)
- Wun (1972)
- Pinup ( Bellaphon Ear 5008 1973 )
- Blues Blast Off! (1976)
- Rags to Gladrags (1976)
- No more cane on the brazos(1976) (munich records)- with Dave Travis, Ted Hatton, Jeff Whittington and Lloyd Ryan
- Rally Round the Flag - Live in Germany, featuring Matt Walsh (1976)
- The Shattered Eye - with Ian Hunt (1979)
- Total - with Ian Hunt (1979)
- Across the Tracks (1982)
- Cushioned for a Soft Ride Inside - with Hans Theesink (1982)

== Bibliography ==
- The Conscience of the Folk Revival: The Writings of Israel “Izzy” Young
- More Blues Singers: Biographies of 50 Artists from the Later 20th Century By David Dicaire
- “Gerry Lockran”. The Encyclopedia of Popular Music, Volume 5.
- Folk Directory
- The Guinness Encyclopedia Of Popular Music
- “Gerry Lockran”. The Encyclopedia of Popular Music, Volume 6
- English Dance & Song.
- Butcher, Jessie Loughran (2007). The Dining Room Wall. AuthorHouse. ISBN 978-1-4343-0765-1.
