= The Vals =

- Origin: Belfast, Northern Ireland
- Genres: Pop, rock, folk, psychedelic
- Years active: 2005–present
- Labels: Unique Records, Electrique Mud
- Members: Paul Doherty; Matt Rice; Conor McCaffrey; Barry Shields
- Past members: Pierre Boudin; John Rossi; Jeremy Meaden; Owen Duffy; Marty Malone; Ronnie Cartwright
- Website: www.thevals.co.uk

The Vals are a psychedelic pop band from Belfast, Northern Ireland.

The Vals are led by songwriter Paul Doherty.

In 2009 they signed with Electrique Mud Records, a subsidiary of Unique Records based in Düsseldorf, Germany. With Electrique Mud they released the singles ‘Yesterday Today’, ‘With You’ and ‘Things Will Always Be the Same’. In October 2009, they released the album ‘Sticks and Stones’ which was distributed worldwide via ALIVE! Artwork for the album was photographed and designed by Stefan Duerr. The album was recorded in just 3 days in Villa Blacksheep studios in Duisburg and produced by Bernhard Ruprecht and assisted by Jürgen Dahmen who also played hammond organ on tracks 'Things will always be the same' and 'Sticks and Stones'.

The song 'Yesterday Today' was used in an episode of popular German soap opera Gute Zeiten, schlechte Zeiten (English: Good Times, Bad Times). The number one show has peaked at 7 million viewers since its first airing in 1992. The Vals track appears in episode 4328.

To celebrate the release of their debut single 'Yesterday Today', the band played a special show in Belfast with Chris Helme of John Squire's post-Stone Roses band The Seahorses.

The Vals also played a live session for BBC Radio One where they played singles 'Yesterday Today', 'With You', and album track 'Light Shine Down'.

Their second single 'With You' was nominated for 'Single of the Week' on BBC Radio 2's The Mark Radcliffe & Stuart Maconie Show

To coincide with the release of their debut album, the band played a European tour which took in Germany, Austria, Switzerland, Ireland and the UK.

In 2010 they headlined the famous 100 Club in London just weeks before former Beatle Paul McCartney headlined his own show in order to save the then threatened building.

During the promotion of the 'Sticks and Stones' album the band shared the stage with Ocean Colour Scene (during both the 'Saturday' and 'Pure Acoustic' tours), Echo and the Bunnymen, Mumford and Sons, Hawkwind, Horslips, The Proclaimers, David Holmes, Bon Iver, The Soundtrack of Our Lives, Noah and the Whale, Jeff Beck, Peter Green of Fleetwood Mac and many more.

The Vals also played the Haldern Pop Festival, Burg Herzberg, Golzheim Fest, Château-d'Oex, Hard Working Class Heroes, Arthur's Day, Glasgowbury, Willowstone and many other high-profile festivals throughout this period.

The Vals headlined the first episode of television show 'UTV Live at the Limelight' alongside Joe Echo (aka Ciaran Gribbins, now frontman of INXS)

They headlined the 'Magners Light Fall For Fashion' extravaganza which took place in the historical St George's Market in Belfast's city centre, on Tuesday, 30 September 2008

In August 2010 The Vals played outside Belfast City Hall on a giant erected stage to celebrate the inauguration of the new Lord Mayor of the city.

The band also celebrated Belfast hosting the 2011 MTV Europe Music Awards by taking part in Belfast Music week where they were joined by Duke Special and James Walsh of Starsailor at the Limelight complex.

Yoko Ono contacted Paul Doherty after she learned of a festival he had organised in Belfast under the banner of 'Peace and Love'.

'Valfest' seen The Vals appear alongside Thin Lizzy founding member and guitarist Eric Bell and Henry McCullough. Yoko sent her message when the festival was organised in Belfast in 2008. An event which helped raise money for local charity.

The message from Yoko included:

"You will know, now that you are doing the Peace and Love Festival, you are connected to all of us, the family of peace of the world. Good for you."

The message was signed off, "lots of love, Yoko".

In 2011 The Vals teamed up with Henry McCullough (Wings & Paul McCartney) on the single ‘Look to the One'. McCullough provided backing vocals and lent his famous guitar sound to the track which gained much success. The video for the 'Look to the One' was produced by Mal Campbell at Causeway Studios. 'Look to the One' was voted 'Single of the Week' by radio station CityBeat which reaches a weekly audience of 144,000 listeners in Belfast, around 25% of the adult population

Another track from the same sessions, Emily O', was recorded alongside the Methodist College Belfast Choir but is yet to be released. During the promotional campaign of the single 'Look to the One', the band performed an acoustic version of Emily O' for the Ralph McClean show on the BBC. This was both filmed and broadcast on radio.

In 2012 The Vals announced the 'Autumn Acoustic Tour' with shows in Hamburg, Düsseldorf and finishing at the world famous Ulster Hall in Belfast.

In February 2013 the band took part in RTÉ's Other Voices Music Trail, an event which celebrated the City of Culture for that year, Derry.

On 26 September 2014 The Vals released Wildflower Way via Unique Records. The album was preceded by singles "Quiet Part of Town" and "I Fall". Both singles had substantial airplay throughout Germany, Switzerland, Austria, Ireland and the UK.

In 2015 the band appeared on ZDF Morgenmagazin television show in Germany performing the track "Echoes of Summer". The estimated television audience is 3 million viewers for the show.

On 1 February 2015 The Vals played the song "Pickepackevoll" live at the German football-themed television show Zeiglers wunderbare Welt des Fußballs. The title of the song and some of the wording of the song were taken from famous phrases used in that show regularly.

The Vals were special guests of Paul Weller on his 2015 European Tour. The band played a total of 9 shows around Europe with Weller in countries France, Belgium, Germany and the Netherlands.

== Discography ==
- 2009 - The Vals - "Yesterday Today" (MCD/Download / MUD002-2)
- 2009 - The Vals - "With You" (MCD/Download / MUD005-2)
- 2009 - The Vals - "Sticks & Stones" (LP/CD/Download / MUD004-1/-2)
- 2010 - The Vals - "Yesterday Today/With You" (7" / MUD002-1)
- 2010 - The Vals - "Things Will Always Be The Same" (Download / MUDDigital01)
- 2011 - The Vals featuring Henry McCullough - "Look to the One" (CD / Download)
- 2014 - The Vals - "Quiet Part of Town" (Download / UNIQ/Digital16)
- 2014 - The Vals - "I Fall" (Download / UNIQ/Digital17)
- 2014 - The Vals - "Wildflower Way" (LP / CD / Download / UNIQ204-1 /-2)
