= Chicken Pot Pie =

Unreleased parody song written by "Weird Al" Yankovic

Song by "Weird Al" Yankovic
- Released: Unreleased
- Genre: Parody

"Chicken Pot Pie" is an unreleased parody song written by "Weird Al" Yankovic. It was written as a parody of "Live and Let Die" by Paul McCartney and Wings; however, Yankovic voluntarily decided not to release it after McCartney declined to support the parody, as he felt it conflicted with his vegetarianism and condoned the consumption of meat.

== History ==
"Weird Al" Yankovic is an American musician, specializing in performing parodies of popular songs. At an airport, the British singer Paul McCartney approached him and said to him: "anytime you want to do one of my songs, it's yours". Two years passed before Yankovic decided to parody McCartney's James Bond song "Live and Let Die" and wrote "Chicken Pot Pie".

Under American law (specifically the 1994 case Campbell v. Acuff-Rose Music, Inc.), Yankovic is not legally required to seek the permission of an artist whose song he wishes to parody, but he chooses to do so as a matter of courtesy. Consequently, Yankovic contacted McCartney to seek his blessing. Despite showing initial enthusiasm for being parodied, McCartney ultimately declined to approve the song. Yankovic stated: "Paul didn't want me to do it because he's a strict vegetarian and he didn't want a parody that condoned the consumption of animal flesh." McCartney did say that he would grant consent if it were retitled "Tofu Pot Pie", but Yankovic refused, citing that the chorus would contain the mimicking of a chicken clucking.

Yankovic has performed segments of the song during live concerts, debuting it in 1992 as part of his "Fast Food Medley" (a compilation of segments of some of Yankovic's food related songs). Yankovic and McCartney never held any ill will over the declination, with McCartney agreeing to a comedy interview between the two in 1996.
