= Big Barn Bed =

Song by Paul McCartney and Wings

from the album Red Rose Speedway
- Released: 30 April 1973
- Recorded: March–October 1972
- Genre: Rock
- Length: 3:48
- Label: Apple
- Songwriters: Paul McCartney, Linda McCartney
- Producer: Paul McCartney

"Big Barn Bed" is a song by Paul McCartney and Wings from the band's 1973 album Red Rose Speedway. The songwriting credits are attributed to Paul McCartney and Linda McCartney.

== Background ==
Like the Red Rose Speedway tracks "Get On the Right Thing" and "Little Lamb Dragonfly", "Big Barn Bed" was a leftover from the McCartneys' solo career. The song dates back to 1971, with the opening lines of the track constituting the coda to the "Ram On" reprise on the McCartneys' album Ram. However, during the recording sessions for Red Rose Speedway, the song was recorded by the band for the new album. "Big Barn Bed" was originally intended to be the opening track of the double-LP version of Red Rose Speedway, but although the final album was cut down to a single disc, the song remained the album's opener.

A live version of "Big Barn Bed" was also included as the opening track in the James Paul McCartney television special, broadcast on 10 May 1973. Throughout the performance of the song, a brief description of each member of the band was displayed on screen.

== Lyrics and music ==
According to music professor Vincent Benitez, "Big Barn Bed" has a freer structure than most of Paul McCartney's songs. He finds the lyrics to seem more like the words were just "strung together" rather than formed into a coherent whole. The lyrics involve big barn beds and leaping armadillos. The song is in the key of F major. Beatle historian Bruce Spizer described the song as "a pleasant-sounding mid-tempo rocker."

== Reception ==
In a contemporary review for Rolling Stone, Lenny Kaye described the track as "captur[ing] McCartney's current approach as well as any", saying, "Neither verse nor chorus are anything much, but the song draws you slowly in with the same steady roll of traction demonstrated by that odd union of records which score heavily in the discotheque markets, reaching its peak with the endless repetitions of the chorus line in the end." Los Angeles Times critic Robert Hilburn called it "an exercise in rhythm that lacks impact." NME writers Roy Carr and Tony Tyler praised the "painstaking" production.

AllMusic editor Stephen Thomas Erlewine includes "Big Barn Bed" among "the greatest songs" on Red Rose Speedway, but labels the track as "slight". Guitar World contributor Damien Faneilli rated it as one of McCartney's 15 best "under-the-radar" post-Beatle songs, praising its simplicity, harmonies, acoustic guitars and "weird but fun lyrics". Author John Blaney considered "Big Barn Bed" to be "little more than an underdeveloped fragment that went nowhere". Ultimate Classic Rock critic Dave Swanson rated "Big Barn Bed" as McCartney's 4th most underrated song, saying that it starts Red Rose Speedway "in wonderful fashion" and that "A seductive rhythm lures in the listener and the echo-laden vocals keep you hooked as a catchy-as-can-be chorus ices the cake." Ultimate Classic Rock critic Nick DeRiso rated "Big Barn Bed" to be Paul McCartney's 17th best song with Wings, praising the first half of the song as "so perfect, so joyous and loved filled" that it overcomes its lack of an appropriate conclusion. The song was included on the deluxe edition of the 2016 compilation album Pure McCartney.

Wings' lead guitarist Henry McCullough included a version of "Big Barn Bed" on his 2011 solo album Unfinished Business.

== Personnel ==
According to the author Luca Perasi:

- Paul McCartney – vocals, backing vocals, bass guitar, piano
- Linda McCartney – backing vocals, vibraslap
- Denny Laine – backing vocals, acoustic guitar
- Henry McCullough – backing vocals, electric guitar
- Denny Seiwell – drums, percussion

Technical

- Paul McCartney – producer
- Phil Chapman – engineer
