= James Paul McCartney (TV programme) =

1973 television special

- The opening title used for the special
- Developed by: ATV
- Directed by: Dwight Hemion
- Starring: Paul McCartney; Linda McCartney; Denny Laine; Henry McCullough; Denny Seiwell
- Composers: Paul and Linda McCartney; Lennon–McCartney; Louis Silvers; George Henry Powell; Jimmie Davis and Charles Mitchell
- Country of origin: United Kingdom
- Original language: English

Production
- Executive producers: Gary Smith, Dwight Hemion
- Producer: Gary Smith (ATV)
- Running time: 50 mins approx.
- Production company: ATV

Original release
- Network: ABC (US); ITV (UK)
- Release: 16 April 1973

Related
- Wings Over the World; Back To The Egg

James Paul McCartney is the title of a 1973 television special produced by ATV, starring English musician Paul McCartney and his then-current rock group, Wings. It was first broadcast on 16 April 1973 in the United States on the ABC network, and later broadcast in the United Kingdom on 10 May 1973. It was issued on DVD for the first time as part of the super-deluxe Red Rose Speedway box set in December 2018.

== Background ==
Paul McCartney agreed to star in a television special for the British ATV company to settle his two-year legal dispute with Sir Lew Grade. As the owner of the network and its music publishing division, and, by extension, the Beatles' Northern Songs catalogue, Grade had objected to McCartney crediting his wife Linda as his co-writer since 1971, citing her lack of professional experience as a songwriter and musician. McCartney's commitment to the television project allowed him to retain the second composer's publishing royalties, which would otherwise have been assigned to Grade's company.

James Paul McCartney was McCartney's first television special since the Beatles' 1967 film, Magical Mystery Tour, and was intended to showcase his versatility as an artist and entertainer. Many segments featured his band, Wings, while in others McCartney performed solo. ATV hired Gary Smith as the producer and Dwight Hemion as the director, although McCartney was assured full creative control over the programme's content. After recently completing their second album, Red Rose Speedway, Wings travelled to Marrakesh in early February 1973 to plan and rehearse for the show.

== Programme content ==
- Part 1
  The programme opens with a live performance by Wings in front of an audience of television screens.
  Song: "Big Barn Bed"
- Part 2
  An acoustic medley of songs is performed by McCartney during a photographic session with his wife Linda as the photographer. This entire segment was omitted from the Japanese broadcast.
  Songs: "Blackbird", "Bluebird" (omitted from the UK broadcast), "Michelle", "Heart of the Country"
- Part 3
  A short music video-style performance set in an outdoor location of McCartney's version of "Mary Had a Little Lamb".
  Songs: "Mary Had a Little Lamb"
- Part 4
  A television studio performance with Wings and orchestra in front of a live audience.
  Songs: "Little Woman Love", "C Moon", "My Love"
- Part 5
  Another music video segment, this time for "Uncle Albert/Admiral Halsey". The "Admiral Halsey" section of the song was not part of the show, however.
  Songs: "Uncle Albert/Admiral Halsey"
- Part 6
  A short voice-over from McCartney introduces a segment set in the Ferry public house in Egremont, near Liverpool. This features members of his family and Wings in a pub singalong. This entire segment was omitted from the Japanese broadcast.
  Songs: "April Showers", "Pack Up Your Troubles in Your Old Kit-Bag", "You Are My Sunshine"
- Part 7
  A Busby Berkeley–style musical number, featuring dancers dressed in half-man/half-woman costumes.
  Songs: "Gotta Sing, Gotta Dance"
- Part 8
  A music video segment where McCartney introduces "Live and Let Die", the title theme from the 1973 James Bond movie.
  Songs: "Live and Let Die"
- Part 9
  "Beatles Medley": a filmed segment with street passers-by singing various Beatles songs (off key) to comedic effect.
  Songs: "When I'm 64", "A Hard Day's Night", "Can't Buy Me Love", "She Loves You", "Ob-La-Di, Ob-La-Da", "Yesterday", "Yellow Submarine"
- Part 10
  "Wings in Concert", recorded on a sound stage at ATV Elstree Studios (Borehamwood) on 18 March 1973, before a live audience.
  Songs: "The Mess", "Maybe I'm Amazed", "Long Tall Sally" (US/Japanese broadcast only; the UK and other European market replaced this with "Hi, Hi, Hi")
- Part 11
  An improvisation called "Well, That's the End of Another Day", followed by a live acoustic performance of "Yesterday". Credits roll over the performance.
  Songs: "Well, That's the End of Another Day", "Yesterday"

== Left-over tracks ==
McCartney performed "Mama's Little Girl", "Hey Diddle", "Long Haired Lady", and "Yesterday", among others, as part of the acoustic medley (Part 2), though they were not edited into any version of the broadcast. The complete recording of this medley appeared since on unofficial "bootleg" releases, along with alternative takes of the intro for "Gotta Sing, Gotta Dance".

Additional tracks performed during the "Wings in Concert" segment (Part 10) included "When the Night", "Wild Life", "Go Now" and "The Long and Winding Road", which was the first time McCartney performed this song in front of a live audience ever.

== Reception ==
Critical reception to the programme was highly unfavourable. According to authors Chip Madinger and Mark Easter, the show "was roundly panned by every critic with a pulse, and was not a stunning success in the ratings either". Melody Maker stated: "McCartney has always had an eye and ear for full-blown romanticism, and nothing wrong with that, but here he too often lets it get out of hand and it becomes over-blown and silly." The New York Times' reviewer described it as "a series of disconnected routines strung together with commercials for Chevrolet cars", while The Washington Post criticised the amount of screen time allocated to Linda McCartney, saying that "her previous careers ... certainly don't qualify her to perform in public."

Writing for Rolling Stone, Lenny Kaye found McCartney "remote and distant from the camera" and added: "if the consequent production did nothing to heal McCartney's ongoing image problem, it certainly didn't help his musical offerings, which came off as forgettably ordinary and certainly disappointing." Referring to the former Beatle's return to television, Alan Coren of The Times wrote: "[James Paul McCartney] was not the sort of programme you make a come-back with. It was the sort of programme you make a come-back after."

Among more recent critiques, Peter Doggett describes the special as "insipid" and "unrecognisable as the work of the man who had conceived Magical Mystery Tour". Robert Rodriguez writes that, in its attempts to present McCartney as all-round entertainer, the show embarrassed and alienated his rock audience, and that even the in-concert segment was lacklustre. Rodriguez concludes: "the band must surely have been conscious of their shortcomings alongside virtually any other recording act of the day. When Henry McCullough buries his head in his hands during the [McCartney] solo finale of 'Yesterday,' one feels his pain." Tom Doyle contends that the show "wasn't all bad" but considers the "Gotta Sing, Gotta Dance" segment and the Chelsea Reach pub scene to have been particularly ill-advised for McCartney's image at the time.

== Home media ==
The special was never released on VHS.

In 2018, a DVD remaster was released as part of the "Paul McCartney Archive" deluxe reissue of Red Rose Speedway. This new edit doesn't contain "Bluebird" as part of the acoustic medley (Part 2), like the original UK broadcast. However, unlike the UK broadcast, the last song of the "Wings in Concert" segment (Part 10) is "Long Tall Sally", as the US/Japanese broadcast, while "Hi, Hi, Hi" is missing.

== Sources ==
- Badman, Keith (2001). The Beatles Diary Volume 2: After the Break-Up 1970–2001. London: Omnibus Press. ISBN 978-0-7119-8307-6.
- Clayson, Alan (2003). Paul McCartney. London: Sanctuary. ISBN 1-86074-486-9.
- Doggett, Peter (2011). You Never Give Me Your Money: The Beatles After the Breakup. New York, NY: It Books. ISBN 978-0-06-177418-8.
- Doyle, Tom (2013). Man on the Run: Paul McCartney in the 1970s. New York, NY: Ballantine Books. ISBN 978-0-8041-7914-0.
- Frontani, Michael (2009). "The Solo Years". In Womack, Kenneth (ed.). The Cambridge Companion to the Beatles. Cambridge, UK: Cambridge University Press. ISBN 978-0-521-68976-2.
- Madinger, Chip; Easter, Mark (2000). Eight Arms to Hold You: The Solo Beatles Compendium. Chesterfield, MO: 44.1 Productions. ISBN 0-615-11724-4.
- Rodriguez, Robert (2010). Fab Four FAQ 2.0: The Beatles' Solo Years, 1970–1980. Milwaukee, WI: Backbeat Books. ISBN 978-1-4165-9093-4.
- Schaffner, Nicholas (1978). The Beatles Forever. New York, NY: McGraw-Hill. ISBN 0-07-055087-5.
- Sounes, Howard (2010). Fab: An Intimate Life of Paul McCartney. London: HarperCollins. ISBN 978-0-00-723705-0.
- Woffinden, Bob (1981). The Beatles Apart. London: Proteus. ISBN 0-906071-89-5.
