= Gene and The Gents =

- Origin: Enniskillen
- Genres: Pop
- Years active: 1964–1968
- Labels: Emerald, Target
- Past members: Paddy McDermott, Dermot Doherty, Pete Watson, Henry McCullough, Tony Gallagher, Barry Scully, Gene Chetty, Pete Cresswell, David Quinn

Gene and The Gents were a Northern Irish pop showband from Enniskillen, who achieved chart success with tracks including "The Way You Wrinkle Your Nose" and "I Came As a Stranger and Stayed As a Friend" as well as "Puppet on a String".

== Early years ==
The band was founded in 1964, with four members of the Enniskillen-based Skyrockets (Paddy McDermott on tenor saxophone (born in 1940, in Enniskillen, County Fermanagh, Northern Ireland); Dermot Doherty on trombone (born in 1940 in Enniskillen, County Fermanagh, Northern Ireland); Pete Watson on drums (born in 1938, in Enniskillen, County Fermanagh, Northern Ireland) and Henry McCullough on lead guitar. The band was joined by Tony Gallagher on rhythm guitar (born in 1943 in Strabane, County Tyrone, Northern Ireland) and Barry Scully on bass (born in 1944, in County Dublin, Ireland, died 10 December 2007, of a heart attack).

The band advertised for a lead singer and found one in Gene Chetty (born Dushy Anthon Chetty, 2 January 1944, in Durban, South Africa), a Trinity College law student, who had come over in 1962 to study law. He auditioned for the group and got the job. The Gents made their debut on St Patrick's Night, 17 March 1964 at The County Hall in Monaghan. McCullough left in 1966 and was replaced by Pete Cresswell (born Peter Cresswell, February 1944, Kingston-upon-Thames, Surrey) as lead guitarist from London, who originally had played on a hit record in 1961 by Bobby Angelo and the Tuxedos called "Baby Sittin". McDermott left in early 1968 and was replaced by Mal Kearns on tenor saxophone, vocals (born Malachy Kearns). Barry Scully left in early 1969, and was replaced by Davy Quinn until the band split in April 1969.

== Singles ==
hmm
Year	Title	Label Code
1965	"Puppet On A String" / "Sweet Little Sixteen"	Emerald MD 1024
1967	"The Way You Wrinkle Your Nose" / "I Came As A Stranger"	Emerald MD 1073
1969	"C'mon Everybody" / "Hound Dog"	Target 7N 17532
