= Red Rose Speedway =

1973 studio album by Paul McCartney and Wings

Studio album by Paul McCartney and Wings
- Released: 30 April 1973
- Recorded: 14 October 1970, 10–11 February 1971, March–June and September–December 1972, January 1973
- Studios: EMI, Olympic Sound, Morgan, Trident and Island, London; CBS Studios and A&R Recording, New York
- Genre: Soft rock
- Length: 42:13
- Label: Apple
- Producer: Paul McCartney

Paul McCartney and Wings chronology
Wild Life (1971)	Red Rose Speedway (1973)	Band on the Run (1973)

Singles from Red Rose Speedway
- 1. "My Love" Released: 23 March 1973

Red Rose Speedway is the second studio album by the British-American rock band Wings, although credited to "Paul McCartney and Wings". It was released through Apple Records in the United States on 30 April 1973 and in the United Kingdom on 4 May, preceded by its lead single, the ballad "My Love". The artist name change was made in the belief that the public's unfamiliarity with the band had been responsible for the weak commercial performance of the group's 1971 debut album Wild Life.

Before recording the album, Wings recruited lead guitarist Henry McCullough and released their debut single, "Give Ireland Back to the Irish", which was banned by the BBC for its political message. Recording sessions for the album took place throughout 1972 at five recording studios in London. The group also recorded the non-album singles "Mary Had a Little Lamb", "Hi, Hi, Hi" and "Live and Let Die", the last of which was issued in June 1973. Originally planned as a double album, it was condensed into a single LP at the request of EMI. The company believed that the material was not of a sufficiently high standard and were mindful of the modest sales of Wild Life and Wings' first two singles. Members McCullough and Denny Laine later expressed disappointment in the choice of songs on the single album.

Red Rose Speedway peaked at number 5 on the UK Albums Chart and number 1 on the Billboard Top LPs & Tape chart in the US, while "My Love" topped the US Billboard Hot 100. Although a commercial success, the album received a mixed response from music critics, with several reviewers considering the songs to be inconsequential and mediocre. Decades later, it continues to receive mixed reviews. The album was reissued in 1987 and 1993 with bonus tracks and remastered in 2018 as part of the Paul McCartney Archive Collection. The 2018 remaster includes the reconstructed double LP version of the album.

== Background ==
In early 1972, Paul McCartney expanded Wings to a five-piece band by adding another guitarist, Henry McCullough, and began touring with the group. The band briefly toured British universities in February. They played in small halls, often unannounced, to avoid the media scrutiny that came with performing at more established venues. The tour was a success, with audiences praising the band's shows and attracting attention in the music press.

Despite not releasing an album in 1972, (Note: It was the first year since 1962 that McCartney had not released an album (both solo and as a member of the Beatles).) Wings issued three singles while preparing their follow-up to Wild Life: "Give Ireland Back to the Irish", which was banned by the BBC for its political sentiments; "Mary Had a Little Lamb", based on the nursery rhyme; and "Hi, Hi, Hi", which was banned by the BBC for drug references and sexually suggestive lyrics. (Note: The BBC banned the song due to the lyrics "I want to lie you on the bed, get you ready for my body gun". However, the actual lyric of the last words is "polygon". The BBC thought of the former due to incorrect lyric sheets sent by the song's publisher, Northern Songs.)

McCartney's solo output following the breakup of the Beatles (McCartney, Ram, Wild Life and the subsequent singles) had been mostly critically derided. He was concerned with his public image. He later told the Los Angeles Times in 1974: "When the Beatles broke up, I personally think my music took a bit of a knock. I lost direction in songwriting." Nevertheless, by March 1972, he believed he had an eclectic assortment of songs that would cover stylistic ground, including newly-written songs and ones dating back to 1970 before the formation of Wings. Two of these songs, "Get on the Right Thing" and "Little Lamb Dragonfly", appeared on the final album.

== Recording ==
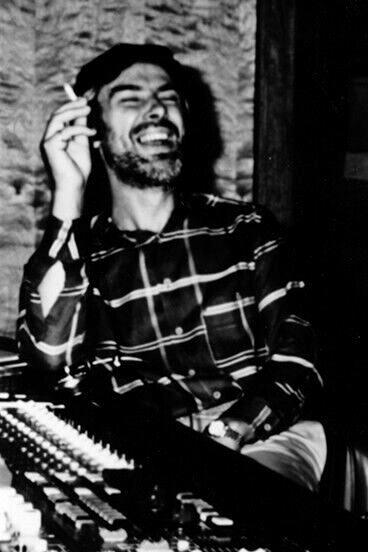
The Red Rose Speedway sessions were initially engineered by Glyn Johns (pictured in 1979), who left the project at the end of March 1972.

Recording for Red Rose Speedway began at Olympic Studios in London on 6 March 1972, with Glyn Johns engineering and McCartney producing. McCartney wanted Johns because he believed he would offer the band a sharper musical direction; Johns had previously worked with the Beatles during the aborted Get Back sessions in 1969. He also chose Olympic because he believed that a break from their regular EMI Studios would help the band find their own sound. McCartney aimed for a relaxed, loose feel for the sessions, which led to jamming and experimentation, at the expense of fully written songs ready to record.

At the first session, the band recorded "Big Barn Bed"; McCartney asked Johns to think of him as "the bass player in the band" rather than as Paul McCartney, but then took offence when Johns duly treated him as an ordinary musician. The next day, 7 March, the band worked on "When the Night", a track that allowed Linda McCartney to play keyboards. The following day, the band recorded "The Mess I'm In" (later shortened to "The Mess"), a song they had been performing live. By 9 March, the band's laid-back attitude and slow progress began to frustrate Johns.

Work continued from 14–23 March, although the band members and Johns grew increasingly frustrated with one another. Johns thought Wings were not a genuine band and not of the calibre of artists he usually worked with. Before long, according to author Howard Sounes, citing the producer's recollection, Johns was reading a newspaper in the control room at Olympic as the group smoked marijuana and jammed aimlessly in the studio. (Note: One evening, according to Johns, Linda McCartney and Denny Laine berated him for his lack of interest, to which Johns responded that they were deceiving themselves if they thought that by simply being in a band with McCartney meant the music they made was worth recording. He told them it was "shite".) Following the recording of the non-album single "Mary Had a Little Lamb" from 27–30 March, Johns quit the project. Johns believed McCartney was "less than secure" about using an outside producer and called the rest of the band members "a bunch of sycophantic musicians who were all climbing up his backside". Seiwell explained that McCartney was "difficult to work with" because he "held the reins so tight", believing he was a "great producer himself" but not with others because he "took his music so personal". On 17 April, Johns told the press that he had quit working on the album due to a "disagreement" with McCartney and that "Now we have respect for each other".

With Johns gone, McCartney initially lost sight of the album and recording was halted. (Note: McCartney had considered hiring Gus Dudgeon to replace Johns, although he declined.) Wings continued to record sporadically in between promoting "Mary Had a Little Lamb", with the group recording the newly-written "Soily" in late April. After the band toured Europe in July and August, further recording sessions took place at Abbey Road Studios and Olympic from October and November 1972. In early September, the band worked on the non-album single "Hi, Hi, Hi" / "C Moon" at Morgan Studios in London. Work continued at EMI Studios for the rest of September, continuing work on "Hi, Hi, Hi" and recording the new songs "Hold Me Tight", "Lazy Dynamite", "Country Dreamer", "I Lie Around", "Night Out", "One More Kiss", "Bridge Over the River Suite" and "Hands of Love"; McCartney decided several of these would be spliced together into a medley. Recording continued into October, recording "Power Cut" and overdubs on several songs. In mid-October, the band recorded "Live and Let Die", the title song to the James Bond film of the same name, with McCartney's former Beatles producer George Martin at AIR Studios in London. (Note: "Live and Let Die" was initially released on the Live and Let Die soundtrack album.) Final recording sessions took place throughout November and into December, with overdubs and new tracks such as "Little Lamb Dragonfly", "Jazz Street", and "Captain of Love"; mixing was completed by 13 December. The album title, Red Rose Speedway, was decided on around the same time. According to McCullough, it came from a book called Tales of the Truth, which had numerous words and phrases that were "really good sounding". (Note: McCartney later said that the title was not named after his housekeeper, Rose.)

With the large amount of material recorded, McCartney initially planned Red Rose Speedway as a double album by mid-November 1972. The purported track listing from drummer Denny Seiwell's acetates of the early incarnation of the album dated 13 December 1972 is listed as follows:

Side one

1. "Big Barn Bed"
2. "My Love"
3. "When the Night"
4. "Single Pigeon"

Side two

1. "Tragedy" (Gerald H. Nelson, Fred B. Burch)
2. "Mama's Little Girl"
3. "Loup (1st Indian on the Moon)"
4. "I Would Only Smile" (Denny Laine)

Side three

1. "Country Dreamer"
2. "Night Out"
3. "One More Kiss"
4. "Jazz Street"

Side four

1. "I Lie Around"
2. "Little Lamb Dragonfly"
3. "Get on the Right Thing"
4. "1882" (live)
5. "The Mess" (live)

Mixing continued into January 1973 with Alan Parsons. By late January, McCartney had deemed the live version of "My Love" from the 1972 tour unsatisfactory and decided to record it properly using an orchestra. Recorded live at EMI Studios, the recording featured McCullough exerting control over McCartney, who expressed himself in his playing of a guitar solo and departed from what he saw as McCartney's regimented approach to recording. In his book The Lyrics: 1956 to the Present (2021), McCartney called the solo "absolutely beautiful" and was proud he gave McCullough the freedom to improvise given his short tenure in the band at that point. By the end of January, additional track lists were conceived. According to McCartney's official website, his archive team found a track listing from 30 January, which McCartney confirmed as the one originally intended for release. It is presented as follows:

Side one

1. "Night Out"
2. "Get on the Right Thing"
3. "Country Dreamer"
4. "Big Barn Bed"
5. "My Love"

Side two

1. "Single Pigeon"
2. "When the Night"
3. "Seaside Woman" (Linda McCartney)
4. "I Lie Around"
5. "The Mess (Live at The Hague)"

Side three

1. "Best Friend (Live in Antwerp)"
2. "Loup (1st Indian on the Moon)"
3. "Medley"
  - "Hold Me Tight"
  - "Lazy Dynamite"
  - "Hands of Love"
  - "Power Cut"

Side four

1. "Mama's Little Girl"
2. "I Would Only Smile" (Denny Laine)
3. "One More Kiss"
4. "Tragedy" (Gerald H. Nelson, Fred B. Burch)
5. "Little Lamb Dragonfly"

In February 1973, Red Rose Speedway was cut down to a single disc by McCartney – according to McCullough, in an attempt to release a more commercial and less expensive record. The decision came about through EMI, however; in addition to believing that the material was not of a sufficiently high standard, the record company were mindful of the modest commercial performance of Wild Life and Wings' first two singles. EMI also reportedly rejected the idea of having a second lead vocalist. McCartney's manager Vincent Romeo stated: "I wanted him to reduce it because it didn't represent his current direction. [...] But he was furious that anyone should want to tamper with his music."

Laine later expressed his disappointment that only a single album was issued, saying that in its original form, Red Rose Speedway was "more of a showcase for the band". Among the omissions were his compositions "I Would Only Smile" and "I Lie Around", on which Laine also sang lead vocals. McCullough was similarly disappointed that several of McCartney's rock-oriented tracks were cut from the running order, which favoured the more lightweight material from the sessions. According to authors Allan Kozinn and Adrian Sinclair, the double LP would have been "a freewheeling collection of ballads, rockers, country tunes, jams and a bit of reggae, with showcase moments for everyone, either as a singer, a player, or a songwriter". As a single LP, the album was reduced to a heavy number of ballads. Kozinn and Sinclair also wrote that, with the deletion of "Seaside Woman", "I Would Only Smile" and "I Lie Around", the album lost the notion that Wings were a band rather than sidemen for McCartney.

=== Outtakes ===
Laine included "I Would Only Smile" on his 1980 solo album Japanese Tears. "Mama's Little Girl" was recorded during the sessions and later turned up as the B-side of McCartney's "Put It There" single in 1990. Among the other discarded tracks were "Night Out", "Jazz Street", "Best Friend", "Thank You Darling", "The Mess" (which McCartney introduced on stage as "The Mess (I'm In)" during Wings' live shows) and a cover version of Thomas Wayne's song "Tragedy". McCartney made other attempts at recording "Soily" in studio including a version recorded in his home studio in January 1972, and in McCartney's "studio performance" film One Hand Clapping, which was eventually released as bonus track on the expanded remastered edition of Venus and Mars. A live version from McNichols Sports Arena in Denver, Colorado, first appeared on the live album Wings over America in 1976. "Seaside Woman" was later released as a single under the pseudonym Suzy and the Red Stripes in 1977, as well as on Linda's posthumous compilation Wide Prairie.

== Music and lyrics ==
Red Rose Speedway is composed mostly of ballads and melody-heavy songs, with "soft" instrumentation and "mellow" backing vocals. It opens with "Big Barn Bed", which dates to 1970; Paul played a short lyrical excerpt on ukulele in the coda of "Ram On (Reprise)" from Ram. "My Love" is about Paul's love for Linda. Paul later called the song his favourite Wings track in 1986. "Get on the Right Thing" is one of the album's more upbeat tracks. According to the music professor Vincent Benitez Jr., it "conveys a message of discernment and self-awareness in the midst of life". John Blaney says it conveys the message of hippies: "oneness with nature, sunshine, the wife and kids, and love sweet love". According to Laine, McCartney was unsure of its quality until the last minute, eventually deciding to include it on Red Rose Speedway.

"One More Kiss" is a vaudeville and country-influenced track about reconciling after a fight. In a 2023 interview, McCartney recalled the song originating after a "fuss" with his young daughter Mary. According to 1974 interview with McCartney, "Little Lamb Dragonfly" originated following the death of a malnourished lamb on the McCartney farm. Originally written for McCartney's Rupert the Bear film, the ballad's musical structure is complex, featuring different sections that appear edited together. "Single Pigeon" uses a pigeon and a seagull as a metaphor for a study on loneliness. McCartney later said he saw a pigeon and pondered why it would be alone: "The minute you decide to make up a story about a pigeon, it's not just a pigeon. It's a character in a play." Benitez Jr. describes it as a cabaret-style song similar to McCartney's 1968 Beatles songs "Rocky Raccoon" and "Honey Pie".

"When the Night" is a love song with harmony vocals from the whole band that are reminiscent of the 1950s. "Loup (1st Indian on the Moon)" is an instrumental that has been compared to Pink Floyd. McCartney described it as "moody" and "spacey" and unlike the rest of the album. According to Seiwell, McCartney told him that he thought "Loup" was "what jazz [sounds like]". The album ends with an 11-minute medley, titled "Medley" in the liner notes, of the songs "Hold Me Tight", "Lazy Dynamite", "Hands of Love" and "Power Cut", which was made in a similar style to the Beatles' Abbey Road medley. "Power Cut" was written during the 1972 miners' strike.

== Artwork and packaging ==
The packaging for Red Rose Speedway included a 12-page LP-size booklet inside a gatefold sleeve. The booklet featured photos from Wings' live shows taken by Joe Stevens (credited as Captain Snap) and others by Linda. The artwork for the inside gatefold and part of the booklet was designed by Eduardo Paolozzi (whom the Beatles' original bassist Stuart Sutcliffe studied under at the Hamburg College of Art), while pop artist Allen Jones contributed drawings, a painting and a photo collage, all variously depicting women, throughout the booklet. The graphics were designed by Gordon House. EMI agreed to pay for the lavish packaging, which was originally intended for the planned double album.

Breaking with the approach taken on the band's previous releases, the artist credit included McCartney's name rather than Wings alone, and instead of a group picture, only his face appears on the front cover. The image shows McCartney in front of a motorbike engine, with a red rose in his mouth, and was taken by Linda. The motorbike, a 1973 FX Harley-Davidson Super Glide, was transported from the United States especially for the shoot, which took place at the photographic studio of the Sunday Times building in central London. The back cover featured the foot of a microphone stand and a bouquet of roses, with the image set inside a black background as if spotlit. In the space below this image was a Braille message to Stevie Wonder, reading "We love ya baby".

The name change to "Paul McCartney and Wings" was made in the belief that the public's unfamiliarity with the band had been responsible for the disappointing sales of Wild Life. In the US, Capitol Records were concerned that the positioning of the red rose on the front cover might make McCartney's face unrecognisable to record buyers. Since no artist credit was included with this image, the company issued the album with a blue sticker in the top right-hand corner, identifying the band and listing the songs.

== Release and promotion ==
In March 1973, Wings filmed McCartney's TV special James Paul McCartney at Elstree Studios in London, which aired in the US on 16 April and in the UK on 10 May. A variety show, it featured footage of the group performing in outdoor settings and in front of a studio audience. The special featured Wings songs, including the unreleased "Bluebird" and "Gotta Sing, Gotta Dance", and McCartney's Beatles songs "Blackbird", "Michelle" and "Yesterday"; it was McCartney's first public performances of Beatles songs since their breakup. Wings filmed performances of "Mary Had a Little Lamb", "Big Barn Bed", "Live and Let Die" and "My Love".

Red Rose Speedway was preceded by the March 1973 release of its lead single, "My Love" backed with "The Mess". The latter song was recorded live during the band's summer 1972 European tour. With Apple Records giving precedence to two Beatles compilation albums – 1962–1966 and 1967–1970 – Red Rose Speedway was not issued until 30 April 1973, in the United States, with the UK release following on 4 May. "My Love" peaked at number 9 on the UK Singles Chart, and topped the US Billboard Hot 100 and Billboard Adult Contemporary charts. It raised expectations for the album, which peaked at number 5 in the UK and went to number 1 in the US. Elsewhere, it charted at number 1 in Australia in Spain, and number 2 in Canada, Denmark, Italy and Sweden.

After a successful British tour in May–June 1973, Wings went into rehearsals for their next album. McCullough and Seiwell abruptly left the band in August, however, at the end of rehearsals. Both musicians were disenchanted with the group's musical direction and Linda's inclusion; McCullough also objected to McCartney's domineering attitude towards him as a guitar player, while Seiwell had long felt aggrieved at the lack of a formalised financial arrangement and his status as a lowly paid sideman.

== Critical reception ==
Professional ratings
Review scores
Source	Rating
AllMusic	4/5 stars
Christgau's Record Guide	D+
The Encyclopedia of Popular Music	3/5 stars
The Essential Rock Discography	5/10
MusicHound	2/5
Q	3/5 stars
The Rolling Stone Album Guide	2/5 stars

Red Rose Speedway received a mixed response from contemporary music critics, many of whom dismissed its songs as mediocre. According to author and critic Bob Woffinden, writing in 1981, the album was an example of McCartney "continu[ing] to exasperate his audience" before he and Wings finally won respect with the late 1973 release of Band on the Run. John Pidgeon of Let It Rock found the side-two medley typical of McCartney's "lazy" attitude to songwriting and said: "Red Rose Speedway sounds as if it was written after a big tea in front of the fire with carpet-slippered feet up; listening to it takes about as much as going ten rounds with a marshmallow fairy." Pidgeon concluded by likening the album to The Emperor's New Clothes, ruing that McCartney appeared to have no one to challenge his judgment or "kick his arse". Village Voice critic Robert Christgau derided McCartney's reliance on "aimless whimsy" and described the work as "Quite possibly the worst album ever made by a rock and roller of the first rank". Jon Wiener, writing in his biography Come Together (1984), also declared it "[maybe] the worst album ever made by a major rock figure", deeming it another harbinger of McCartney's decline as a songwriter. In the Los Angeles Times, Robert Hilburn dismissed the album as "a careful, cautious, low-keyed effort, one that repeatedly tells us McCartney is in love, but doesn't offer any fresh or inviting treatment of the theme." Lynn Van Matre was hostile in the Chicago Tribune, declaring McCartney's post-Beatles work "bland ballady banalities and bubble gum that smacks no less of stickiness for being Beatle-blown".

Red Rose Speedway was such a non-confident record. There were some beautiful songs ... there was "My Love" but something was missing. We needed a heavier sound. It was a terribly unsure period.

— Linda McCartney to Sounds magazine, 1976

According to author Michael Frontani, a generally favourable review in Rolling Stone, written by musician Lenny Kaye, signified a turnaround from a publication that had been openly hostile towards McCartney since 1970. Frontani adds: "While McCartney's music would continue to be criticised by some commentators as vacuous and facile, Kaye's review appears to mark the point where art of consequence was no longer required of McCartney by rock critics ..." Amongst positive reviews, Billboard and Record World believed it was his best work since leaving the Beatles; the latter said that "Paul creates the kind of melodic and lilting music that stays with the listener, and the lyrics reflect empathetic innocence." Ian Dove of The New York Times noted that McCartney's work continued to pale beside that of his former bandmates John Lennon and George Harrison but deemed Red Rose Speedway his best album yet. Writing in the NME, Tony Tyler acknowledged that the album was "lightweight" and lacking in "intellectual posture" but added: "with all the current heaviness and after-me-the-apocalypse brainstuds around, I for one am bloody pleased to discover a lightweight record that not only fails to alienate, but actually succeeds in impressing via good melodic structure, excellent playing and fine production."

Like the NME, Rolling Stone soon changed its opinion of Red Rose Speedway. Writing in The Rolling Stone Record Guide (1979), John Swenson said that the album displayed "the worst aspects of McCartney as solo artist and band-leader" and was "rife with weak and sentimental drivel". In his 1978 book The Beatles Forever, Nicholas Schaffner described it as "pleasingly plump music – charming, harmless, entertaining fluff ... a perfect background to lazy afternoons in the sun". Years after its release, McCartney looked back on the album with regret, saying that it "has its moments, but nothing approaching the impact of the band in person. [...] After I had heard Wild Life, I thought, 'Hell, we have really blown it here.' And the next one after that, Red Rose Speedway, I couldn't stand." Joe Stevens, Wings' tour photographer in the early 1970s, recalled: "I thought Red Rose was a disaster and so did everyone connected with it. Except Paul."

In later decades, most reviewers consider Red Rose Speedway uneven and disjointed. AllMusic editor Stephen Thomas Erlewine considers Red Rose Speedway "deliberately slight ... in the way a snapshot album is important to a family yet glazes the eyes of any outside observer", but he adds: "Work your way into the inner circle, and McCartney's little flourishes are intoxicating – not just the melodies, but the facile production and offhand invention." Beatles biographer Robert Rodriguez views it as "a wildly uneven assortment of songs", of which the selections comprising the Abbey Road-style medley "aren't merely half-finished – they're half-assed". John Blaney states that while it was "better conceived, performed and produced" than Wild Life, the chosen songs for the single LP were "lightweight and pedestrian". While describing Glyn Johns's disparaging comments about the finished album as "harsh", Howard Sounes writes: "but in a record review one couldn't award it more than three out of five stars." In 2018, Nick DeRiso of Ultimate Classic Rock called the album "a hodgepodge of ideas, without a delineated focus." The same year, Billboard magazine's Morgan Enos argued that Red Rose Speedway (and Wild Life) are enjoyable for what they are, with the former being "warm and inviting as an easy chair".

== Reissues ==
The original compact disc version, released by EMI's Fame label on 5 October 1987, (Note: UK Fame CD-FA 3193/CDM 7 52026 2) contained three bonus tracks: "I Lie Around", "Country Dreamer" and "The Mess (Live at The Hague)". An LP version of this CD edition was also released on the same day, omitting the bonus tracks. (Note: UK Fame FA 3193) On 7 July 1993, Red Rose Speedway was remastered and reissued on CD as part of The Paul McCartney Collection series, with "C Moon", "Hi, Hi, Hi", "The Mess (Live at The Hague)" (the B-side to "My Love") and "I Lie Around" (the B-side to "Live and Let Die") as bonus tracks. "Country Dreamer" was later added to the reissue Band on the Run from the same series.

Red Rose Speedway, along with Wild Life, was reissued and remastered as part of Paul McCartney Archive Collection on 7 December 2018, both separately and as a deluxe package titled Wings 1971–73. It was available as six-disc (3CD, 2DVD + Blu-ray) Deluxe Edition, a 2CD Special Edition, a 2LP Vinyl and Digital/Streaming. The bonus content includes the reconstructed original double LP version of the album, various singles, B-sides and outtakes. The DVDs feature previously unseen footage from the Wings Over Europe Tour, the James Paul McCartney TV Special, the film The Bruce McMouse Show, as well as music videos and interviews. The box set also includes a 128-page book featuring rare images, the story of the album and five handwritten replica lyric sheets.

There was a limited-edition half-speed mastered vinyl re-issue in the UK to mark the album's 50th anniversary. This was released as part of Record Store Day on 22 April 2023.

== Track listing ==
All songs written by Paul and Linda McCartney.

Side one

1. "Big Barn Bed" – 3:48
2. "My Love" – 4:07
3. "Get on the Right Thing" – 4:17
4. "One More Kiss" – 2:28
5. "Little Lamb Dragonfly" – 6:20

Side two

1. "Single Pigeon" – 1:52
2. "When the Night" – 3:38
3. "Loup (1st Indian on the Moon)" – 4:23
4. "Medley" – 11:14
  - "Hold Me Tight" – 2:22
  - "Lazy Dynamite" – 2:50
  - "Hands of Love" – 2:14
  - "Power Cut" – 3:46

Additional tracks on the 1993 CD reissue

10. "C Moon" – 4:34
11. "Hi, Hi, Hi" – 3:08
12. "The Mess" (Live at The Hague) – 4:34
13. "I Lie Around" – 5:01

== Personnel ==
=== Wings ===
- Paul McCartney – lead vocals, bass, piano, guitars, electric piano, Mellotron, celeste, Moog synthesiser, ocarina
- Linda McCartney – vocals, piano, organ, electric piano, electric harpsichord, percussion
- Denny Laine – vocals, guitars, bass, harmonica
- Henry McCullough – lead guitars, backing vocals, percussion
- Denny Seiwell – drums, percussion

=== Additional personnel ===
- Hugh McCracken – guitar on "Little Lamb Dragonfly"
- David Spinozza – guitar on "Get on the Right Thing"
- Alan Parsons – engineer
- Dixon Van Winkle – engineer on "Get on the Right Thing", "Little Lamb Dragonfly"
- Richard Hewson – orchestral arrangement, conducting
- Unnamed session players – strings, brass

== Charts ==
=== Weekly charts ===
Chart (1973)	Peak position
Australian Kent Music Report	1
Belgium Wallonia Albums Chart	3
Canadian RPM 100 Albums	2
Danish Albums Chart	2
Dutch MegaCharts Albums	6
French SNICOP Albums Chart	9
Japanese Oricon Weekly LP Chart	13
Norwegian VG-lista Albums	4
Spanish Albums Chart	1
Swedish Albums Chart	2
UK Albums Chart	5
US Billboard Top LPs & Tape	1

Chart (2018)	Peak position
German Albums (Offizielle Top 100)	56
Scottish Albums (Official Charts)	60
UK Albums Chart	82
US Billboard 200	149
US Top Rock Albums	25

=== Year-end charts ===
Chart (1973)	Position
Australian Albums Chart	2
Dutch Albums Chart	42
French Albums Chart	44
US Billboard Pop Albums	33

== Certifications ==
Region	Certification	Certified units/sales
Australia (ARIA)	Gold	35,000^{^}
Canada (Music Canada)	Platinum	100,000^{^}
United Kingdom (BPI)	Gold	100,000^{^}
United States (RIAA)	Gold	500,000^{^}
^{^} Shipments figures based on certification alone.
