= Live and Let Die (song) =

1973 song by Paul McCartney and Wings

- Small-centre variant of the UK 7-inch single

Single by Wings

from the album Live and Let Die
- B-side: "I Lie Around"
- Released: 1 June 1973
- Recorded: 19–21 October 1972
- Studio: AIR (London, UK)
- Genre: Symphonic rock; hard rock
- Length: 3:12
- Label: Apple
- Songwriters: Paul McCartney; Linda McCartney
- Producer: George Martin

Paul McCartney and Wings singles chronology
"My Love" (1973)	"Live and Let Die" (1973)	"Helen Wheels" (1973)

James Bond theme singles chronology
"Diamonds Are Forever" (1971)	"Live and Let Die" (1973)	"The Man With the Golden Gun" (1975)

Official audio
- "Live and Let Die" (2018 Remaster) on YouTube

"Live and Let Die" is the theme song of the 1973 James Bond film of the same name and its accompanying soundtrack album, performed by the British rock band Wings. Written by English musician Paul McCartney and his wife Linda McCartney, it reunited McCartney with former Beatles producer George Martin, who produced the song and arranged the orchestra. McCartney was contacted to write the song by the film's producers Harry Saltzman and Albert R. Broccoli before the screenplay was finished. Wings recorded "Live and Let Die" during the sessions for Red Rose Speedway in October 1972 at AIR Studios. It was also the first rock song to open a Bond film. Another version by B. J. Arnau also appears in the film.

Upon release, "Live and Let Die" was the most successful Bond theme up to that point, reaching No. 1 on two of the three major US charts, No. 2 on the Billboard Hot 100, and No. 9 on the UK Singles Chart. The song also received positive reviews from music critics and continues to be praised as one of McCartney's best songs. It became the first Bond theme song to be nominated for the Academy Award for Best Original Song, but ultimately lost the award to Barbra Streisand's "The Way We Were" from the film of the same name at the 46th Academy Awards. It won Best Arrangement Accompanying Vocalist(s) at the 16th Annual Grammy Awards in 1974.

Wings performed "Live and Let Die" live during their concert tours and McCartney continues to play it on his solo tours, often using pyrotechnics during the instrumental breaks. It has been covered by several bands, including Guns N' Roses, whose version appears on their 1991 album Use Your Illusion I. One of the more popular covers of the song, their version was nominated for the Grammy Award for Best Hard Rock Performance at the 35th Annual Grammy Awards in 1993. In 2012, McCartney was awarded the Million-Air Award from Broadcast Music, Inc. (BMI), for more than 4 million performances of the song in the US.

== Background and recording ==
"Live and Let Die"
A 19-second sample of "Live and Let Die". The beginning of the song has been stylistically compared to "Let It Be", while the chorus has been called a "man-in-the-street's impression of John Barry".

Even before Tom Mankiewicz had finished writing the screenplay to Live and Let Die, producers Harry Saltzman and Albert R. Broccoli invited Paul McCartney to write the theme song. McCartney asked to be sent a copy of Ian Fleming's novel. "I read it and thought it was pretty good. That afternoon I wrote the song and went in the next week and did it ... It was a job of work for me in a way because writing a song around a title like that's not the easiest thing going."

Originally, Saltzman was interested in having Shirley Bassey or Thelma Houston perform it instead of Wings. Producer George Martin said McCartney would allow the song to be used in the movie only if Wings was able to perform the song in the opening credits. The recording contract specified that McCartney would "perform the title song under the opening titles".

A second version of the song, performed by B. J. Arnau, also appears in the film. Arnau's performance was originally meant for the group Fifth Dimension. The Arnau version of the song appears on the soundtrack album as a component in a medley that also contains two George Martin-composed instrumental pieces, "Fillet of Soul – New Orleans" and "Fillet of Soul – Harlem". It was also released by RCA Records as a single in late June 1973.

Wings recorded "Live and Let Die" during the sessions for the Red Rose Speedway album, in October 1972. The song was recorded at AIR Studios, with Ray Cooper providing percussion instruments.

== Release and aftermath ==
"Live and Let Die" was previewed in the 1973 television special James Paul McCartney, which aired on 16 April in the United States and 10 May in the United Kingdom. In the segment, McCartney and Wings were shown performing the song in his studio, while clips of the film were shown, before the film's US theatrical release on 27 June. In his contemporary review of the single for the NME, Ian MacDonald wrote: "McCartney's fairly reasonable solution to the given problem 'Write, in less than 25 bars, a theme-tune for the new James Bond movie' is to 'Let It Be' for the first half, wailing absently and with a curious notion of grammar, about this 'ever changing world in which we live in', before sitting back to let a 3,000-piece orchestra do a man-in-the-street's impression of John Barry. It's not intrinsically very interesting, but the film will help to sell it and vice versa."

Billboard's contemporary review called it "the best 007 movie theme" to that time and one of McCartney's most satisfying singles, by combining sweet melody, symphonic bombast and some reggae into one song. Cash Box said that the song was "absolutely magnificent in every respect". Record World predicted that it "should have a long chart life".

"Live and Let Die" reached No. 1 on two of the three major US charts, and No. 2 on the US Billboard Hot 100 for three weeks. The single was certified Gold by the Recording Industry Association of America for sales of over one million copies.

Sales of the single release and of the sheet music were "solid". The sheet music used the line "in this ever-changing world in which we live in" as part of the opening verse of the song. In the Washington Post interview more than 30 years later, McCartney told the interviewer, "I don't think about the lyric when I sing it. I think it's 'in which we're living', or it could be 'in which we live in', and that's kind of, sort of, wronger but cuter", before deciding that it was "in which we're living".

A live version of "Live and Let Die" appeared on the album Wings Over America (1976), but the studio version did not feature on any McCartney album prior to the 1978 compilation Wings Greatest, and was included again on 1987's All the Best!, 2001's Wingspan: Hits and History, 2016's Pure McCartney, in 2018 as a restored bonus track on a reissue of Red Rose Speedway, and 2025's Wings. The entire soundtrack was also released in quadrophonic. It was also included on The 7" Singles Box in 2022.

United Artists promoted the song in trade advertisements for Academy Award consideration, though producer Broccoli opposed the marketing tactic as unnecessary. The song became the first James Bond theme song to be nominated for an Academy Award for Best Original Song (garnering McCartney his second Academy Award nomination and Linda McCartney her first). In the Academy Award performance of the song at the 46th Academy Awards, entertainer Connie Stevens dressed in a "silver-lamé outfit" with a Native American-looking headdress "descended from the ceiling" and then was "variously lifted and tossed about" by dancers dressed in various colours until she left the scene. The song lost to the eponymous theme song from the film The Way We Were.

In Wings' live performances of the song, the instrumental break featured flashpots and a laser light show. McCartney has continued to play the song on his solo tours, often using pyrotechnics. "Live and Let Die" is the only song to appear on all of McCartney's live albums (except for the 1991 acoustic-based Unplugged).

Following the 9/11 attacks, the song was placed on Clear Channel's list of inappropriate song titles.

An instrumental part of the song was used as the theme for the French political talk show L'heure de vérité, which ran on Antenne 2 (later France 2) from 1981 to 1995. The show was rebooted in 2026, using the same theme.

The song with an extended introduction was included in the movie Shrek the Third (2007) and on its soundtrack. It was also used to underscore the montage celebrating the 60th anniversary of the James Bond franchise, as presented at the 94th Academy Awards in 2022. Thai singer Lisa performed "Live and Let Die" at the 97th Academy Awards as part of a musical tribute to James Bond.

== Personnel ==
According to the author Luca Perasi:

Musicians

- Paul McCartney – lead and backing vocals, piano, electric piano
- Linda McCartney – backing vocals
- Denny Laine – backing vocals, bass guitar
- Henry McCullough – electric guitar
- Denny Seiwell – drums
- Ray Cooper – tympani, percussion, duck call
- London Symphony Orchestra – full orchestra (arranged by George Martin)

Technical

- Paul McCartney – producer
- George Martin – producer
- Bill Price – engineer

== Charts ==
=== Weekly charts ===
Chart (1973)	Peak position
Australia (Kent Music Report)	5
Belgium (Ultratop 50 Wallonia)	32
Canada (RPM 100 Top Singles)	2
Japan (Oricon)	25
Netherlands (Dutch Top 40)	27
Netherlands (Single Top 100)	29
New Zealand (Listener)	20
Norway (VG-lista)	2
UK Singles (Official Charts)	9
US Billboard Hot 100	2
US Billboard Easy Listening	8
US Cash Box Top 100	1
US Record World Singles Chart	1
West Germany (GfK)	31

=== Year-end charts ===
Chart (1973)	Rank
Australia	36
Canada	39
US Cash Box Top 100	33
US Billboard Hot 100	56

== Certifications ==
Region	Certification	Certified units/sales
United Kingdom (BPI)	Silver	200,000^{‡}
United States (RIAA)	Gold	1,000,000^{^}
^{^} Shipments figures based on certification alone.^{‡} Sales+streaming figures based on certification alone.

== Unreleased "Weird Al" Yankovic parody ==
In 1984, McCartney asked "Weird Al" Yankovic when he was going to parody one of his songs. In 1992, Yankovic asked for permission to put his parody "Chicken Pot Pie" on an album. McCartney denied the use because he is a vegetarian and did not want to promote the consumption of meat. Yankovic, a vegetarian himself, said he respected the decision; however, he has performed the song live in the 1990s as part of a food-themed medley.

== Guns N' Roses version ==
"Live and Let Die"
- US retail cassette edition; the US CD edition was a promo-only release

Single by Guns N' Roses

from the album Use Your Illusion I
- B-side: "Live and Let Die" (live)
- Released: 3 December 1991
- Genre: Hard rock, symphonic rock
- Length: 3:04
- Label: Geffen; Uzi Suicide
- Songwriters: Paul McCartney; Linda McCartney
- Producers: Mike Clink; Guns N' Roses

Guns N' Roses singles chronology
"Don't Cry" (1991)	"Live and Let Die" (1991)	"November Rain" (1992)

Music video
- "Live and Let Die" on YouTube

American rock band Guns N' Roses covered "Live and Let Die" in 1991. It was released as the second single from their 1991 album, Use Your Illusion I, and the fourth out of all the Use Your Illusion singles. This cover was commercially successful and was nominated for the Grammy Award for Best Hard Rock Performance at the 35th Annual Grammy Awards in 1993. It was voted third best cover song in a 2008 poll by Total Guitar.

In the April 1992 issue of Guitar for the Practicing Musician, Slash explained to John Stix how the group came to record the song:

It's one of those songs, like "Heaven's Door," that Axl and I have always loved. It's always been a really heavy song, but we'd never discussed it, and didn't know that we each liked it. We were talking one night about a cover song and that came up, and we were like, "Yeah! Let's do it!" So I went to rehearsal with Izzy and Matt and Duff, just to see whether we could sound good playing it, and it sounded really heavy.

In his 2007 self-titled memoir, Slash credits Axl Rose for his synthesizer work on the track, writing, "When we did 'Live and Let Die', it was all synths – those horns are not horns. What Axl did there was really complex; he spent hours dialing all that shit in, getting the nuances just right, and I have to give him that."

Guns N' Roses' cover charted at No. 20 on the US Billboard Album Rock Tracks chart and No. 33 on the Billboard Hot 100. Worldwide, the single reached the top five on the Irish Singles Chart, in Norway, and the UK Singles Chart. In Finland, it became the third consecutive number-one single from the Use Your Illusion albums, and it also reached No. 1 in New Zealand for two weeks. A music video was made in November 1991 featuring the band playing live on stage and showing old pictures. The video also was made shortly before Izzy Stradlin's departure, and it is the last video in which he appears.

Guns N' Roses' version of this song appears on the soundtrack of the 1997 movie Grosse Pointe Blank.

In May 2020, Guns N' Roses' version of this song played while President Donald Trump visited a Phoenix, Arizona medical mask factory that was producing masks to prevent deaths during the COVID-19 pandemic, which had killed over 250,000 people worldwide at the time. Although White House directives had encouraged all Americans to wear masks in public during this period, Trump did not don a mask while this song played. Later that month, the band unveiled a new t-shirt on their website branded “Live N’ Let Die With COVID 45” in reference to Trump's factory visit. All proceeds from sales of the t-shirt were donated to the Recording Academy's MusiCares, which provides services and resources to those in need in the music community.

=== Track listing ===
1. "Live and Let Die" – 2:59
2. "Live and Let Die" (Live from Wembley Stadium, August 31, 1991.) – 3:37
3. "Shadow of Your Love" (Live) – 2:50

=== Personnel ===
Guns N' Roses

- W. Axl Rose – lead vocals, keyboard, programming, backing vocals
- Slash – lead guitar, 6-string bass
- Izzy Stradlin – rhythm guitar
- Duff McKagan – bass
- Matt Sorum – drums
- Dizzy Reed – keyboards

Additional musicians

- Shannon Hoon – backing vocals
- Johann Langlie – programming
- Jon Trautwein – horn
- Matthew McKagan – horn
- Rachel West – horn
- Robert Clark – horn

=== Charts ===
==== Weekly charts ====
Chart (1991–1992)	Peak position
Australia (ARIA)	10
Austria (Ö3 Austria Top 40)	27
Belgium (Ultratop 50 Flanders)	20
Europe (Eurochart Hot 100)	7
Finland (Suomen virallinen lista)	1
France (SNEP)	39
Germany (GfK)	33
Greece (IFPI)	10
Ireland (IRMA)	5
Luxembourg (Radio Luxembourg)	6
Netherlands (Dutch Top 40)	12
Netherlands (Single Top 100)	13
New Zealand (Recorded Music NZ)	1
Norway (VG-lista)	3
Portugal (AFP)	3
Sweden (Sverigetopplistan)	15
Spain (AFYVE)	14
Switzerland (Schweizer Hitparade)	19
UK Singles (Official Charts)	5
UK Airplay (Music Week)	17
US Billboard Hot 100	33
US Mainstream Rock Airplay (Billboard)	20
US Cash Box Top 100	26

==== Year-end charts ====
Chart (1992)	Position
New Zealand (Recorded Music NZ)	27

=== Certifications ===
Region	Certification	Certified units/sales
Australia (ARIA)	Gold	35,000^{‡}
New Zealand (RMNZ)	Platinum	30,000^{‡}
United Kingdom (BPI)	Gold	400,000^{‡}
^{‡} Sales+streaming figures based on certification alone.

=== Release history ===
Region	Date	Format(s)	Label(s)	Ref.
United States	3 December 1991	Cassette	Geffen; Uzi Suicide	
United Kingdom	9 December 1991	7-inch vinyl; 12-inch vinyl; CD; cassette	Geffen; Uzi Suicide	
Japan	5 February 1992	Mini-CD	Geffen; Uzi Suicide	

== See also ==
- Outline of James Bond
