= Man on the Run (2025 film) =

2025 documentary film

- Theatrical release poster
- Directed by: Morgan Neville
- Produced by: Morgan Neville; Chloe Simmons; Meghan Walsh; Scott Rodger; Ben Chappell; Michele Anthony; David Blackman
- Narrated by: Paul McCartney
- Edited by: Alan Lowe
- Production companies: Tremolo; MPL Communications; PolyGram Entertainment
- Distributed by: Amazon MGM Studios (via Prime Video, worldwide); MetFilm Distribution (United Kingdom); Trafalgar Releasing (United States)
- Release dates: 30 August 2025 (TFF); 19 February 2026 (United States and United Kingdom); 27 February 2026 (Prime Video)
- Running time: 115 minutes (Note: Cinema release is 127 minutes and includes a bonus conversation with Paul McCartney and director Morgan Neville.)
- Countries: United Kingdom; United States
- Language: English
- Box office: $501,000

Man on the Run is a 2025 documentary film directed by Morgan Neville about the life of Paul McCartney from his departure from The Beatles, the start of his solo career, his formation of Wings, through the 1970s. McCartney is credited as an executive producer.

The film coincided with the 2025 box set Wings and the book Wings: The Story of a Band on the Run.

== Release ==
The film premiered at the Telluride Film Festival on 30 August 2025. A day prior to its Telluride premiere, Amazon MGM Studios acquired worldwide distribution rights.

It had a limited theatrical release by Trafalgar Releasing on 19 February 2026, and was released on Amazon Prime Video on 27 February 2026, when the soundtrack album was also released.

== Reception ==
On the review aggregator website Rotten Tomatoes, 100% of 69 critics' reviews are positive, with an average rating of 8.0/10. The website's consensus reads: "Chronicling Paul McCartney's time spent in the creative wilderness through when he regrew his wings, Man on the Run is a lovely testament to the musical genius and his romantic partnership with Linda McCartney." Metacritic, which uses a weighted average, assigned the film a score of 78 out of 100, based on 17 critics, indicating "generally favorable" reviews.

In The Guardian, Peter Bradshaw gave the film 4/5 stars, writing: "You may find yourself wondering why we are going over this ground again, but it’s an engaging film, and there is always something mesmeric in McCartney’s face: cherubic, and yet sharp and watchful." In NME, Jordan Bassett also gave 4/5 stars, writing: "The director does an excellent job of capturing the weight of expectations laid at McCartney’s door in April 1970, when he casually revealed that the Beatles were no more. ... At one point, [McCartney] insists he’s not a workaholic but a 'playaholic', which might be the ultimate Macca-ism. In fact, that quip sums up his depiction in Man On The Run: goofy and a little corny, but always endearingly himself."

Chris Willman wrote in Variety: "Man on the Run is a heck of a lot of fun to watch ... Neville’s movie serves as a splendid jukebox, offering rapid-fire clips that bowl you over anew with just how rapidly McCartney’s own synapses were firing on ingenious hit after hit. What it isn’t, though, is revelatory. ... Neville’s film is probably aimed most at the fair-weather oldsters who have fairly cursory memories of McCartney’s 1970s work, and/or the young people who haven’t yet encountered it in the first place, than to hardcore Beatlemaniacs hoping this would be a prime opportunity to open the door and let us (further) in." In The Times, Kevin Maher gave 4/5 stars, writing: "There is so much to love in this guilty-pleasure documentary from Morgan Neville. ... Here, while charting the glorious rise and quiet collapse of Wings, McCartney’s post-Beatles outfit, Neville mostly stands back and allows nearly two hours of deep-dive archive material to do the work. ... In the end there are no revelations, just a warm and cosy restatement of cultural history. Wings were good, the Beatles were better, and the musical world is very lucky indeed to have been enriched by Paul McCartney."

In Rolling Stone (UK), Nick Reilly gave 4/5 stars, writing: "It’s clear that, eventually, Wings were the success that McCartney had always envisaged them being. It may have took some time, as this documentary shows in admirably honest detail. It’s the story of a man on the run from the greatest band of the all time, but eventually heading in the direction of another almighty success. McCartney fans will lap it up." In Time Out, Phil de Semlyen gave 4/5 stars and wrote: "Piecing together a snappy collage of ’70s home video, unseen archive and gig footage, plus some insightful voiceover interviews, the Piece By Piece and 20 Feet From Stardom director revisits Paul McCartney as he tries to figure out what it is to be an ex-Beatle – and, ideally, how to graduate from it."
