= The Half Moon, Putney =

Music venue in London, England

Coordinates: 51.467232°N 0.220172°W

The Half Moon
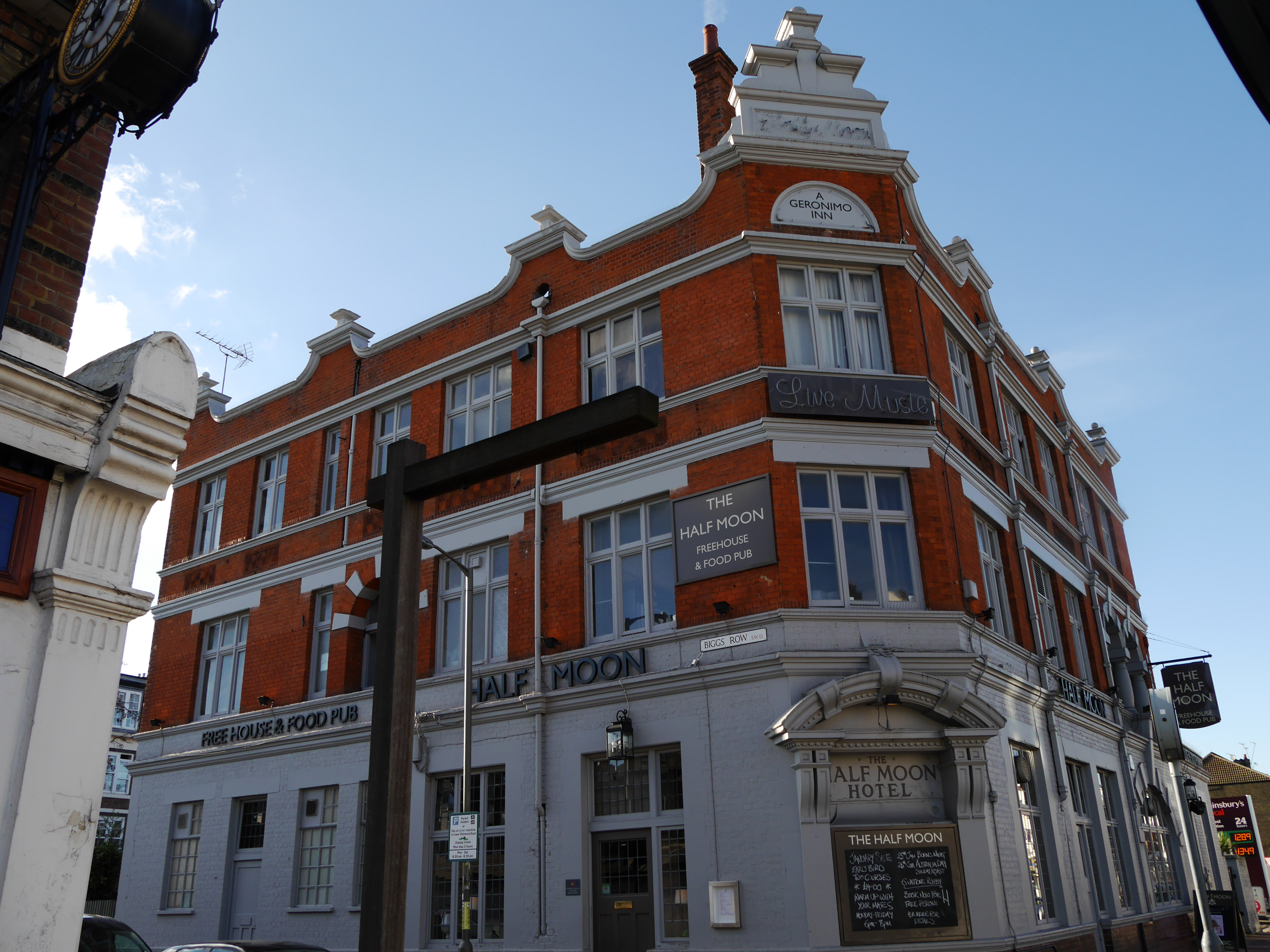
- The Half Moon, 2014
- Interactive map of The Half Moon
- Location: Putney; London, SW15 1EU, England
- Capacity: 250
- Public transit: Putney

Construction
- Opened: 1960s

Website
- https://www.halfmoon.co.uk/

The Half Moon is a public house and music venue in Putney, London. It is one of the city's longest running live music venues, and has hosted live music every night since 1963.

== Location ==
The pub is on the south side of the Lower Richmond road, in the London Borough of Wandsworth.

== History ==
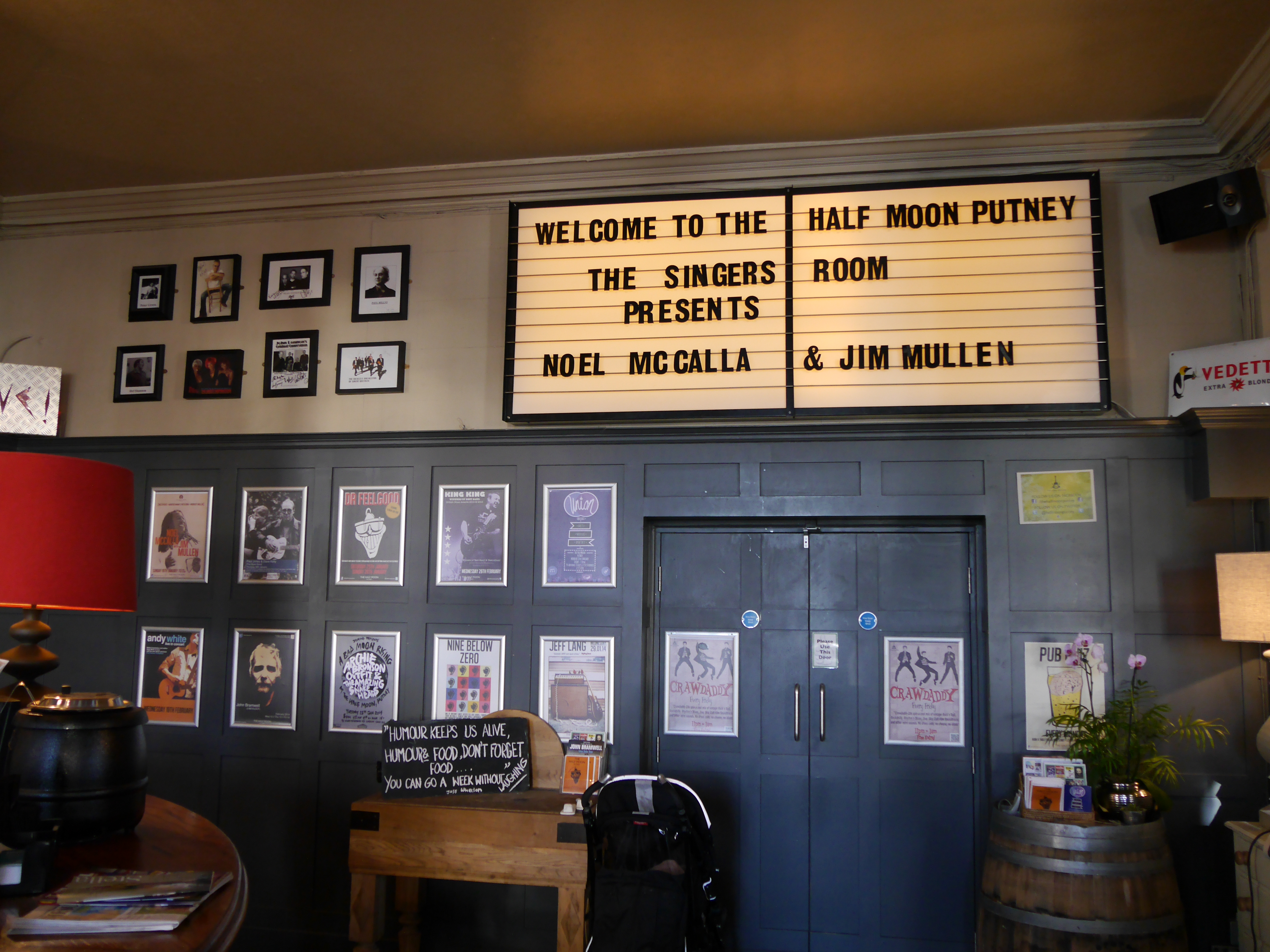
Interior

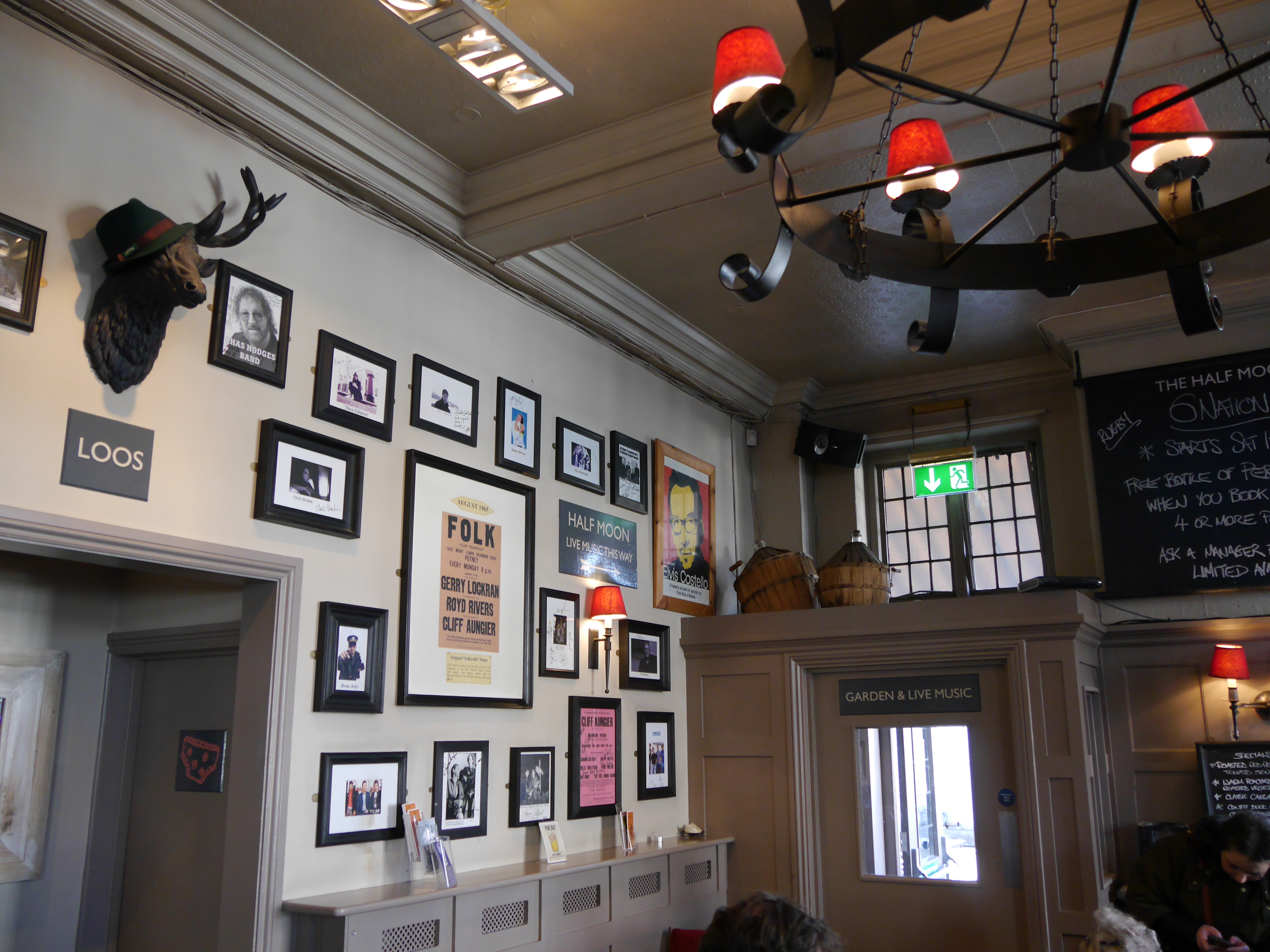
Interior

The Half Moon is one of London's longest running, and most respected live music venues. Since the early 1960s, some of the biggest names in popular music have performed there, including The Rolling Stones, and The Who. The venue has hosted live music every night since 1963.

It all began with the folk and blues sessions started by Gerry Lockran, Royd Rivers and Cliff Aungier in 1963. 'Folksville', as the sessions were called, featured new British and European artists alongside established American blues-men. These included Sonny Terry and Brownie McGhee, Champion Jack Dupree and Arthur Crudup. British acts included Ralph McTell, John Martyn, Bert Jansch and Roy Harper.

John Mayall's Bluesbreakers, Alexis Korner, and The Yardbirds made an appearance here and at other South London venues such as The Eel Pie Club and Crawdaddy Club.

As blues and folk thrived, bringing Fairport Convention and Van Morrison, so other genres began to appear. From the psychedelia of The Bonzo Dog Doo Dah Band and Bob Kerr's Whoopee Band; to 1960s mod groups The Pretty Things and Nashville Teens; to early pub-rock acts such as Dr. Feelgood; the Half Moon was the centre of not only the emerging music scenes but continued to host the big names.

It was never just a "passing through" venue. Residencies at the Half Moon have included Elvis Costello (who would play a couple of times a month in the mid-1970s for 50 pence and a plate of sandwiches) and Steve Marriott of Small Faces fame. John Martyn returned decades after his first Half Moon gigs to a week-long residency, and both Tim Rose and Roy Harper did the same. On 24 July 2007, Welsh-language folk guitarist Meic Stevens performed his first London gig in over 30 years at the Half Moon. Other memorable gigs at the Half Moon include k.d. lang's first UK appearance, Kate Bush's first ever public performance and a surprise appearance by Nick Cave. The Hamsters played their last shows at the Half Moon in 2012, signing off on a 25-year career with five shows over one weekend.

The Half Moon has always been synonymous with The Rolling Stones, whose most recent visit was a private event held in May 2000. As well as performing as the band, individual members have appeared here in various side-projects, and have also used the venue for rehearsal space. In January 2010, the Half Moon almost closed due to failing sales, rising rates and the recession, but they received hundreds of signatures and a Facebook campaign of 6,500 people. Musicians such as The X Factor finalist Jamie Archer, Eddi Reader and Simon Fowler supported the petition as well. As part of its revival, the Half Moon started serving food.

In 2012, the Half Moon was bought by Geronimo Inns, whose parent company is Young & Co.

== Artists who have appeared ==
Artists who have performed or recorded at the venue since the mid-1960s include the Rolling Stones, The Who, The Small Faces, Kasabian, Sisteray, Chris Bell, Ralph McTell, Cliff Aungier GoodLuck, John Martyn, John Mayall's Bluesbreakers, Alexis Korner, The Yardbirds, Bob Kerr's Whoopee Band, Morrissey–Mullen – who had a residency there of several years' standing, Rocket 88, Fairport Convention, Bonzo Dog Doo-Dah Band, Roy Harper, Van Morrison, Man, Danny Thompson, Dr. Feelgood, Elvis Costello, The Boys From County Hell, Meic Stevens, Finley Quaye, I Am Kloot, Starlite Campbell Band, Beverley Craven, Bo Diddley, John Otway, Tim Rose, Amy McDonald, Catfish Keith, The MonaLisa Twins, as well as k.d. lang's first UK appearance, and Kate Bush's first public performance.

It has also hosted comedy, including Billy Connolly, Andy Parsons, Harry Hill, Rufus Hound, Shappi Khorsandi, Norman Lovett, Bob Mills, Milton Jones, Al Murray, Stewart Lee, Richard Herring, Jack Whitehall, Alistair McGowan, Katherine Ryan, Cardinal Burns, Reginald D. Hunter, Stewart Francis, Bridget Christie, Josh Widdicombe, Sara Pascoe, Rob Beckett, Sean Hughes, Kevin Eldon, Henning Wehn, Hal Cruttenden, Holly Walsh, Danny Bhoy, Aisling Bea and James Acaster.

== Discography – live recordings ==
- Live at Half Moon Putney – The De Luxe Blues Band (1981)
- An Evening with Meic Stevens: Recorded Live in London – Meic Stevens (2007) (Sunbeam Records, SBRCD5033)
- Live at the Half Moon – Catfish Keith (2009) (Fish Tail Records)
- Remember, on stage at The Half Moon – Latin Quarter (2023) (Westpark Music)

== Transport ==
The pub is served by Transport for London buses 22, 265, 378, 485 which stop on the Lower Richmond road. Putney Bridge tube station (District line) is a 12 minute walk over Putney Bridge and Putney railway station (Southwestern Railway) is a 12 minute walk up Putney High Street.

The Santander Cycles Putney Pier docking station is a three minute walk.
