= My Love (Paul McCartney and Wings song) =

1973 single by Paul McCartney and Wings

- Italian picture sleeve

Single by Paul McCartney and Wings

from the album Red Rose Speedway
- B-side: "The Mess"
- Released: 23 March 1973
- Recorded: January 1973
- Studio: Abbey Road, London
- Genre: Soft rock; lounge
- Length: 4:07
- Label: Apple
- Songwriters: Paul McCartney, Linda McCartney
- Producer: Paul McCartney

Paul McCartney and Wings singles chronology
"Hi, Hi, Hi" (1972)	"My Love" (1973)	"Live and Let Die" (1973)

Music video
- "My Love" on YouTube

"My Love" is a song by the British–American band Paul McCartney and Wings that was first released as the lead single from their 1973 album Red Rose Speedway. It was written by Paul McCartney as a love song to his wife and Wings bandmate Linda. The single marked the first time that McCartney's name appeared in the artist credit for a Wings record, after their previous releases had been credited to Wings alone. Released on 23 March 1973, the song topped the Billboard Hot 100 chart in the US for four weeks and peaked at number 9 on the UK Singles Chart. The single was viewed as Wings' first significant success in the US and helped Red Rose Speedway achieve commercial success.

Wings recorded "My Love" at Abbey Road Studios in London in January 1973. The song is a piano ballad and features an orchestral arrangement by Richard Hewson that was recorded live with the main track. The recording also includes a guitar solo by Henry McCullough that some commentators view as a highlight of the track. In his improvised playing, McCullough imposed his own style on a Wings song for the first time, countering the more regimented approach favoured by McCartney.

Despite its commercial success, "My Love" was given an unfavourable reception by many music critics, some of whom considered it overly sentimental and lyrically inconsequential. A live version of the song was included on Wings' 1976 album Wings over America, and McCartney has continued to perform it in concert as a tribute to Linda following her death in 1998. He included the song in the musical programme for Linda's memorial services in London and New York City, where it was performed by a string quartet. Tony Bennett, Nancy Wilson, Brenda Lee, Mariah Carey, Andy Williams and Harry Connick Jr are among the many artists who have covered the song.

== Background and composition ==
Paul McCartney began writing "My Love" on piano as a love song to his wife Linda. He said he wrote it early on in their relationship; McCartney biographer Luca Perasi dates the composition to 1969 or 1970. The song is a piano ballad in the style of McCartney's Beatles song "The Long and Winding Road".

After forming the band Wings with Linda in the summer of 1971, McCartney included "My Love" in the set lists for the group's two concert tours in 1972. When they performed it at Nottingham University on 9 February for Wings' public debut, the song included Linda singing lines in response to McCartney's lead vocal. According to Perasi, the performance was otherwise "almost identical" to the version that the band subsequently recorded for official release.

The song is in the key of F major. It opens with an extended ambient note before the vocal enters. The composition has an AABAA structure followed by an outro, with the A sections comprising verse-choruses and the B section containing a bridge. According to musicologist Vincent Benitez, the verses establish a "sense of instability" through lyrics such as "And when I go away" and "And when the cupboard's bare", implying distance and material emptiness, respectively, and this mood is supported by the inclusion of chords such as B♭maj7 and D9 that suggest a departure from the home key. He says the choruses and the bridge then convey the emotional security provided by the singer's lover – lyrically, and through the incorporation of a plagal progression (in the chorus) and other chords that correspond with F major. The outro consists of the first part of the bridge; McCartney sings "Only my love does it good" before pausing and then returning with a prolonged vocalisation of the word "to" then resolving to "me".

== Recording ==
McCartney invited Richard Hewson, with whom he had worked before while with the Beatles, to arrange the orchestral accompaniment for "My Love". The song was recorded live at Abbey Road Studios in London with a 50-piece orchestra accompanying the band. The session took place in January 1973, late in the recording for Wings' second album, Red Rose Speedway. McCartney played Fender Rhodes electric piano on the track, while Denny Laine substituted for McCartney on bass guitar. The idea to tape the basic track and the orchestral arrangement simultaneously went against music industry convention, since the session musicians were paid by the hour. Hewson recalled that he recruited "the best jazz musicians I knew ... They had this particular warm sound" and that the reason for the live recording was because McCartney wanted to capture "a certain feeling". In music journalist Tom Breihan's description, although the song appears to lack a formal structure, "It chugs and twinkles with the slow confidence of an old torch song, while the orchestra ... swells and contracts."

According to Hewson, around 20 takes were performed over three hours, leaving the musicians tired and having to assure McCartney that their playing could not be improved on. The song contains a guitar solo by Northern Irish guitarist Henry McCullough, who took the opportunity to express himself in his playing and depart from what he saw as McCartney's regimented approach to recording. McCullough later said, "it had got to the point where I achingly wanted to be the guitar player in the band", rather than a sideman playing lines dictated by McCartney. McCartney recalled in a 2010 interview:

I'd sort of written the solo, as I often did write our solos. And he walked up to me right before the take and said, "Hey, would it be alright if I try something else?" And I said, "Er ... yeah." It was like, "Do I believe in this guy?" And he played the solo on "My Love", which came right out of the blue. And I just thought, Fucking great. And so there were plenty of moments like that where somebody's skill or feeling would overtake my wishes.

According to McCullough, it was the first time anyone in Wings had challenged McCartney, and it was an approach that others in the band encouraged, in an effort to make Wings a genuine band and improve McCartney's image. He described the result on "My Love" as "a stroke of luck, a gift from God really, and you get that in music". (Note: In 2010, McCullough told The Irish News that he had drawn inspiration from "the power of the orchestra, the electric guitar slung round my neck and knowing that if I didn't come up with something I'd have to slink away with my head bowed".) In his book The Lyrics: 1956 to the Present (2021), McCartney called the solo "absolutely beautiful" and was proud he gave McCullough the freedom to improvise given his short tenure in the band at that point.

== Release ==
Apple Records issued "My Love" as a single on 23 March 1973, with the US release following on 9 April. The B-side was "The Mess", recorded live at the Netherlands Congresgebouw in The Hague on 21 August 1972. (Note: Although essentially a live recording, "The Mess" was subjected to heavy editing and some overdubbing in the studio. Portions of up to 45 seconds were excised to reduce the song's length and the vocals were heavily processed.) For the first time in the group's career, the release was credited to "Paul McCartney & Wings", rather than Wings alone. The name change was made in the belief that the disappointing sales of Wings' 1971 debut, Wild Life, were due to the public being unaware of McCartney's involvement. Red Rose Speedway was released on 30 April 1973 and was similarly credited to Paul McCartney & Wings. "My Love" was sequenced as the album's second track, between "Big Barn Bed" and "Get on the Right Thing".

The single's release marked the start of a highly active period for Wings. The band filmed a promotional clip for the song, which used an alternate McCartney lead vocal. They also promoted the single on the James Paul McCartney TV special. McCartney had agreed to do the special in return for Lew Grade, whose company ATV owned the Northern Songs publishing catalogue, dropping his legal objections to Linda being credited as a co-writer on many of his songs since 1971. The band filmed a performance of "My Love" for Top of the Pops, which was shown on the 4 and 11 April editions of the show. Immediately after completing this performance, McCullough vomited on the stage; drunk beforehand, he had become nauseated by the studio smoke effects. The incident had an adverse effect on his already fractious relationship with McCartney. Wings played "My Love" throughout their 1973 UK tour. These live performances were the source of frustration for McCullough, who was denied the freedom to improvise when playing the solo. Adhering to a populist approach over McCullough's blues sensibilities, McCartney insisted that he reproduce the solo exactly as heard on the studio recording.

The single topped the US Billboard Hot 100 for four weeks and peaked at number nine on the UK Singles Chart. The song also went to number one on Billboard's Easy Listening chart for three weeks. On the Billboard Hot 100, it was demoted by George Harrison's "Give Me Love (Give Me Peace on Earth)" in late June, marking the first time since 25 April 1964 that the Beatles had occupied the top two positions on the chart, and the only occasion that any of its former members have done so as solo artists. The popularity of "My Love" also contributed to the commercial success of Red Rose Speedway, which became the first of five consecutive Wings albums to top the Billboard LPs chart; according to author Bruce Spizer, it was "the song that sold the album". The single was certified Gold by the Recording Industry Association of America on 9 July, for sales of over one million copies. Billboard ranked "My Love" at number five on its Year-End Hot 100 singles of 1973 chart.

The song was subsequently included on the 1978 Wings compilation album Wings Greatest. It has also appeared on the McCartney compilations All the Best! (1987), Wingspan: Hits and History (2001), Pure McCartney (2016), Wings (2025) and on the 2022 box set The 7" Singles Box. A live version from Wings' 1976 US tour, with McCullough's replacement, Jimmy McCulloch, on lead guitar, was released on the Wings over America triple album. McCartney has since included live performances of the song on his albums Paul Is Live (1993), Back in the World (2002) and Good Evening New York City (2009).

== Critical reception ==
=== Contemporary reviews ===
Cash Box's single reviewer described "My Love as a "fine ballad" and said that, although it was lacking in melody, McCartney's "added sentiment & crooning will soon make this a classic". Record World called it "a luscious ballad that should become an instant standard." Chris Welch of Melody Maker wrote: "A grand ballad from Paul, rather in the tradition of songs that turned on the troops in the days of the Cyprus Crisis and other manifestations of the '50s. In a way its appeal is timeless, and it certainly rates among his seemingly unstoppable flow of classics." Welch highlighted the "splendid gutty guitar solo" and predicted: "Much fluttering of wings and handkerchiefs as this sails up the charts."

When "My Love" came out, John Lennon actually said, "If only everything was as simple and unaffected as McCartney's new single, then maybe Dean Martin and Jerry Lewis would reunite with the Marx Brothers." We were going through a slagging off period with each other ... He called me Engelbert, and Engelbert Humperdinck started getting annoyed with me.

— Paul McCartney

Other critics ridiculed the song. To writers in the countercultural press, it furthered McCartney's standing as an artist of little consequence, a perception that was increased by his decision to supply the theme song for the 1973 James Bond film Live and Let Die. According to Beatles biographer Nicholas Schaffner, the inclusion of lyrics such as "Wo wo wo wo, only my love does it good" in the packaging for Red Rose Speedway "didn't help McCartney's dissolving reputation" as a lyricist. Schaffner said that the James Paul McCartney special was even more damaging to McCartney's image and that, among the show's worst moments, "Paul tried to make passionate faces while crooning 'My Love,' looking instead as if he'd just sucked a lemon."

In his "Consumer Guide" review for The Village Voice, Robert Christgau wrote that "[McCartney's] new love ballad meanders hopelessly where 'Yesterday' shifted enticingly" and he described Red Rose Speedway as "Quite possibly the worst album ever made by a rock and roller of the first rank". Five years later, in his review of Wings Greatest, Christgau wished for "a stylus-width scratch across 'My Love'". NME critics Roy Carr and Tony Tyler said the song was among the "dreamy weepies" that were a signature of McCartney's songwriting and, with all the former Beatles' artist royalties frozen due to ongoing litigation over Apple, an important source of income as material for other artists to cover. They described the song as "positively oozing Manciniesque strings and the kind of sentimentality that one finds either cloying or soothing".

=== Retrospective assessments ===
Writing in the 2004 edition of The Rolling Stone Album Guide, Greg Kot described "My Love" as McCartney's "soggiest hit" and "over-orchestrated". Former Mojo editor Mat Snow calls it a "slow-dance single" that, although commercially successful, suffered unfavourable comparison with the Beatles' 1962–1966 and 1967–1970 compilation albums, which were released around the same time in 1973 and "reminded everyone of just how good Paul's old band was". Writing in 2017, Rolling Stone critic Rob Sheffield dismissed it as "the worst song any of the Beatles had anything to do with". In Sheffield's opinion, McCartney was seeking to emulate the Beatles' 1969 ballad "Something", written by Harrison, but he missed the aesthetic significance of the six-note guitar "hook" that precedes the verse of Harrison's composition, instead inserting the "Wo-wo-wo-wo" refrain that sinks "My Love". Sheffield says the ending provides a "whopper of unintentional comedy", as McCartney dramatically draws out the word "me" to become "Meeeeeee-wo-wo-wo-wo-wo-ho, wo-ho, whooooa!" (Note: This portion of the Wings recording was used in comedian Dickie Goodman's 1973 single "Watergrate", a satire of the Watergate scandal. At the end of the song, Goodman asks Vice-President Spiro Agnew who will succeed Richard Nixon as US president, to which the answer comes as McCartney singing the final "me" from "My Love".) In his song review for Stereogum, Tom Breihan gives the track a score of five out of ten and concludes: "So 'My Love,' like a lot of McCartney songs, is a pretty and fluffy and sincere and meaningless thing – a song that would probably work as a prom ballad if it had the discipline to hit the big prom-ballad moments. It's nice enough, and I'll never understand, beyond simple name recognition, how it was as big as it was."

Biographer Philip Norman pairs the song with "Maybe I'm Amazed" as "ode[s] to Linda" that, in the context of McCartney's songwriting in 1973, were "so far beyond his usual Wingspan that the dream-voices which had whispered "Yesterday" and "Let It Be" into his ear might have returned". In his book on McCartney for the Praeger Singer-Songwriter Series, Vincent Benitez describes "My Love" as "an outstanding song highlighted by equally outstanding ensemble playing", particularly the "sublime solo" contributed by McCullough. Robert Rodriguez, writing in his book on the Beatles' first decade as solo artists, says that McCullough's playing redeemed a "potentially mawkish McCartney valentine" and he considers the track to be the highlight of a mediocre album. Former Record Collector editor Peter Doggett calls the song "sickly" and says that even after EMI had persuaded McCartney not to release Red Rose Speedway as a double LP, it remained an unimpressive collection of songs.

== Cover versions ==
By the late 1970s, "My Love" was the second most-covered song written and released by a former Beatle since the band's break-up, after Harrison's "My Sweet Lord". Tony Bennett, Nancy Wilson and Cass Elliot are among the many singers who recorded the song. Others include Johnny Gill, Cher, Brenda Lee (from New Sunrise), Margie Joseph, Salena Jones, Mina, Shinehead, Andy Williams, Juice Newton, Warren Hill, Dottie West, and Mariah Carey. There have also been three jazz instrumental versions, by Ivan "Boogaloo Joe" Jones, Pieces of a Dream (from their 1996 album The Best of Pieces of a Dream), and Michael Lington (from the 2004 album Stay with Me).

An instrumental of the song can be heard during Monica and Chandler's wedding in the American sitcom Friends. Corinne Bailey Rae released a cover of the song on The Love EP (2011). Harry Connick Jr covered "My Love" on the 2014 album The Art of McCartney, a tribute album to McCartney. In 2025, Mariah Carey covered the song for her album Here For It All. Billboard writer Heran Mamo noted that "while McCartney's original version is tender, Carey's is robust, her vocals overpowering the track's orchestration before giving way to the sentimental, reworked instrumental solo".

== Legacy ==
Rodriguez describes "My Love" as McCartney's "first post-Beatles evergreen" and a standard, due to its instant popularity among other recording artists. In 1976, Linda reflected that Red Rose Speedway was "such a non-confident record" made during a "terribly unsure period", yet it still contained "beautiful songs" such as "My Love". In 1986, McCartney selected it as his favourite track from the Wings era and recalled the time as "a romantic period, folks!" McCullough, whose post-Wings career included playing with Joe Cocker and Donovan, and recording albums under his own name, considered the guitar solo on "My Love" to be the best of his career.

Following Linda's death in 1998, "My Love" was among the songs McCartney chose for the musical program at the two memorial services held in her memory, in London and New York City. McCartney was highly public in his expression of grief and organised the services with what biographer Howard Sounes describes as "the same professionalism he brought to his concert performances". Arranged for strings, the song was the closing piece performed by the Brodsky Quartet at St Martin-in-the-Fields church in London's Trafalgar Square on 8 June. At the New York service, held at Riverside Church in Upper Manhattan on 22 June, it was performed by the Loma Mar Quartet. Both events were given heavy coverage by news media. McCartney also included the song among the Linda-inspired compositions recorded for his 1999 classical music album Working Classical, where it was again performed by the Loma Mar Quartet.

McCartney included "My Love" in the set list for his Driving World Tour in 2002, when, bolstered by the support of his second wife, Heather Mills, he returned to touring for the first time since 1993. McCartney performed the song in Linda's memory, as his renditions of "Something" and "Here Today" were tributes to his former Beatles bandmates Harrison and John Lennon, respectively. (Note: McCartney's 2001 album Driving Rain included "About You", in which he expressed his gratitude to Mills for her help when grieving Linda's death. Norman describes the album's central theme as "how Heather had rescued him from tempests of grief".) Following his acrimonious divorce from Mills in 2008, he again performed the song in concert as a tribute to Linda. According to Sounes, whereas the live renditions of "My Love" had "seemingly irritated" Mills on the 2002 tour, McCartney's performances in 2008 were accompanied by pictures of Linda projected onto "huge screens" with "all images of Heather excised".

== Personnel ==
According to authors Luca Perasi and Howard Elson:

Paul McCartney and Wings

- Paul McCartney – lead vocal, electric piano
- Linda McCartney – backing vocal
- Denny Laine – bass guitar, backing vocal
- Henry McCullough – lead guitar
- Denny Seiwell – drums

Additional musicians

- Richard Hewson – orchestral arrangement, conducting
- unnamed session players – strings, brass

== Charts ==
=== Weekly charts ===
Chart (1973)	Peak position
Australia (Go-Set Top 40 Singles)	4
Australia (Kent Music Report)	5
Belgian BRT Top 30 (Flanders)	17
Belgian Ultratop Singles (Wallonia)	16
Canadian RPM 100 Singles	2
Canadian RPM Adult Contemporary	1
Japanese Oricon Singles Chart	39
Netherlands GfK Charts	12
New Zealand Listener Chart	3
Norwegian VG-lista Singles	7
UK Singles Chart	9
US Billboard Hot 100	1
US Easy Listening (Billboard)	1
West Germany (Media Control)	43

=== Year-end charts ===
Chart (1973)	Rank
Australia (Kent Music Report)	24
Canada Top 100 (RPM)	30
US Billboard Hot 100	5

=== All-time charts ===
Chart (1958–2018)	Position
US Billboard Hot 100	134

== Certifications ==
Region	Certification	Certified units/sales
United States (RIAA)	Gold	1,000,000^{^}
^{^} Shipments figures based on certification alone.

== See also ==
- List of Billboard Hot 100 number-one singles of 1973
- List of number-one adult contemporary singles of 1973 (U.S.)

== Sources ==
- Badman, Keith (2001). The Beatles Diary Volume 2: After the Break-Up 1970–2001. London: Omnibus Press. ISBN 978-0-7119-8307-6.
- Benitez, Vincent P. (2010). The Words and Music of Paul McCartney: The Solo Years. Santa Barbara, CA: Praeger. ISBN 978-0-313-34969-0.
- Brackett, Nathan; Hoard, Christian, eds. (2004). The New Rolling Stone Album Guide. New York, NY: Simon & Schuster. ISBN 0-7432-0169-8.
- Carr, Roy; Tyler, Tony (1978). The Beatles: An Illustrated Record. London: Trewin Copplestone. ISBN 0-450-04170-0.
- Castleman, Harry; Podrazik, Walter J. (1976). All Together Now: The First Complete Beatles Discography 1961–1975. New York, NY: Ballantine Books. ISBN 0-345-25680-8.
- Clayson, Alan (2003). Paul McCartney. London: Sanctuary. ISBN 1-86074-482-6.
- Doggett, Peter (2011). You Never Give Me Your Money: The Beatles After the Breakup. New York, NY: It Books. ISBN 978-0-06-177418-8.
- Doyle, Tom (2013). Man on the Run: Paul McCartney in the 1970s. New York, NY: Ballantine Books. ISBN 978-0-8041-7914-0.
- Elson, Howard (1986). McCartney: Songwriter. London: W.H. Allen. ISBN 0-491-03325-7.
- Madinger, Chip; Easter, Mark (2000). Eight Arms to Hold You: The Solo Beatles Compendium. Chesterfield, MO: 44.1 Productions. ISBN 0-615-11724-4.
- McCartney, Paul (2021). Muldoon, Paul (ed.). The Lyrics: 1956 to the Present. New York City: Liveright. ISBN 978-1631492563.
- McGee, Garry (2003). Band on the Run: A History of Paul McCartney and Wings. Lanham, MD: Rowman & Littlefield. ISBN 978-0-87833-304-2.
- Norman, Philip (2016). Paul McCartney: The Biography. London: Weidenfeld & Nicolson. ISBN 978-0-297-87075-3.
- Perasi, Luca (2013). Paul McCartney: Recording Sessions (1969–2013). Milan: L.I.L.Y. Publishing. ISBN 978-88-909122-1-4.
- Rodriguez, Robert (2010). Fab Four FAQ 2.0: The Beatles' Solo Years, 1970–1980. Milwaukee, WI: Backbeat Books. ISBN 978-1-4165-9093-4.
- Schaffner, Nicholas (1978). The Beatles Forever. New York, NY: McGraw-Hill. ISBN 0-07-055087-5.
- Sheffield, Rob (2017). Dreaming the Beatles: The Love Story of One Band and the Whole World. New York, NY: HarperCollins. pp. 208–09. ISBN 978-0-06-220765-4.
- Snow, Mat (2013). The Beatles Solo: The Illustrated Chronicles of John, Paul, George, and Ringo After The Beatles. New York, NY: Race Point Publishing. ISBN 978-1-937994-26-6.
- Sounes, Howard (2010). Fab: An Intimate Life of Paul McCartney. London: HarperCollins. ISBN 978-0-00-723705-0.
- Spizer, Bruce (2005). The Beatles Solo on Apple Records. New Orleans, LA: 498 Productions. ISBN 0-9662649-5-9.
- Woffinden, Bob (1981). The Beatles Apart. London: Proteus. ISBN 0-906071-89-5.
