= Henry McCullough =

Northern Irish guitarist, singer and songwriter (1943–2016)

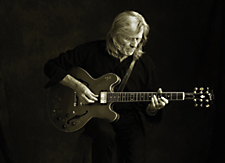
- McCullough in the studio in 2008

Background information
- Born: Henry Campbell Liken McCullough; 21 July 1943; Portstewart, County Londonderry, Northern Ireland
- Died: 14 June 2016 (aged 72) Ballywindelland, Ballymoney, County Antrim, Northern Ireland
- Genre: Rock
- Occupations: Musician; singer; songwriter
- Instruments: Guitar; bass guitar; vocals
- Years active: 1961–2012
- Formerly of: Éire Apparent; The Grease Band; Spooky Tooth; Wings

Henry Campbell Liken McCullough (21 July 1943 – 14 June 2016) was a musician and singer-songwriter from Northern Ireland. He was best known for his work as a member of Spooky Tooth, the Grease Band and Paul McCartney and Wings. He also performed and recorded as a solo artist and session musician.

== Early life ==
McCullough was born in Portstewart, County Londonderry, to a Protestant family. He first came to prominence in the early 1960s as the teenage lead guitarist with the Skyrockets showband from Enniskillen.

In 1964, with three other members of the Skyrockets, he left and formed a new showband fronted by South African-born vocalist Gene Chetty, which they named Gene and the Gents. In 1967, McCullough moved to Belfast where he joined Chris Stewart (bass), Ernie Graham (vocals) and Dave Lutton (drums) to form the psychedelic band the People. Later that year the band moved to London and were signed by Chas Chandler's management team, who changed the group's name to Éire Apparent. Under Chandler's guidance after a single release they toured with groups such as Pink Floyd, Soft Machine, the Move and the Jimi Hendrix Experience, as well as Eric Burdon and the Animals. In mid-February 1968, in Vancouver, British Columbia, Canada, while the band was touring with the Animals, McCullough returned to the United Kingdom, officially because of "visa problems", and Mick Cox flew out to take his place in the band. Back in Northern Ireland, around May 1968, McCullough joined folk group Sweeney's Men.

== 1970s ==
McCullough returned to London around 1969 to work with Joe Cocker as a member of his backing band, the Grease Band. With Cocker he toured the U.S. and performed at the Woodstock Festival. He later played on the Grease Band's eponymous album. During his time with the band he appeared as lead guitarist on the studio album of Andrew Lloyd Webber and Tim Rice's rock opera Jesus Christ Superstar (1970) and on the progressive Spooky Tooth album The Last Puff (1970).

In January 1972, Paul McCartney asked McCullough to join his new band, Wings, with an eye toward starting a tour of British universities. McCullough's first recording with Wings was the February 1972 protest single, "Give Ireland Back to the Irish". The song, which expressed outrage at the events of Bloody Sunday, proved controversial. McCartney was accused by the British media of expressing support for the Irish Republican Army, and author Howard Sounes suggests that McCullough, as an Ulster Protestant with British unionist sympathies, may have had his misgivings about releasing the song as a single. He spent more than a year in the band, playing lead guitar on several singles, including "Hi, Hi, Hi", "Live and Let Die" and "My Love", as well as on the album Red Rose Speedway. Musical and business differences with McCartney, however, saw McCullough leave on the eve of the Band on the Run sessions in August 1973.

McCullough's spoken words "I don't know; I was really drunk at the time" can be heard on the Pink Floyd album The Dark Side of the Moon (1973), at the end of the song "Money". He was recalling a fight he had the night before with his wife.

In 1975 McCullough joined the Frankie Miller Band with bassist Chris Stewart, keyboard player Mick Weaver and drummer Stu Perry. They recorded the album The Rock with Miller. Later the same year, McCullough released Mind Your Own Business on George Harrison's Dark Horse label.

McCullough played concerts as a session musician with Roy Harper, Frankie Miller, Eric Burdon, Marianne Faithfull, Ronnie Lane and Donovan. In 1977 he temporarily joined Dr. Feelgood, following the departure of Wilko Johnson.

== 1980s ==
In August 1980, McCullough toured Ireland for two weeks with a backing band of Mitch Mitchell, Chris Stewart, Steve Simpson and Tim Hinkley. He had settled in Dublin, where in the early 1980s he severed the tendons in his playing hand in an accident with a knife, which kept him out of action for a long time. Once he recovered he started playing again, sitting in with the Fleadh Cowboys at their Sunday afternoon residency in the Lower Deck in Portobello. In 1988 he formed his own band to tour Ireland, and he later moved back to Portstewart. He was joined by Percy Robinson on pedal steel guitar, Roe Butcher on bass and Liam Bradley on drums.

== 1990s ==
In 1998, McCullough travelled to Poland, where he rehearsed with a band of Polish musicians for a tour. After the tour, they recorded a 'live' album which was released as Blue Sunset. This was followed by a further Polish tour. On returning home, McCullough recorded and released "Failed Christian", a song that has since been covered by Nick Lowe on his album Dig My Mood.

== 2000s ==
McCullough continued to record and perform and released solo material, including Belfast To Boston (2001) and Unfinished Business (2003). The latter contained his 1998 single, "Failed Christian". McCullough performed at concerts in Northern Ireland and Scotland, playing with a backing band (featuring Stephen Quinn on drums and Sean McCarron on saxophone).

McCullough contributed guitar on and organised the band for the 2003 release When A Wrong Turns Right by Alaskan musician The Rev Neil Down. The Henry McCullough Band – FBI Live was released in 2007 on Mundell music, from a recording at The Famous Bein Inn in 2006.

In 2007, Over the Rhine covered "Failed Christian" on their album, Live from Nowhere, Vol. II. In the same year, McCullough started to work with Dave Sharp from the Alarm) and together they enlisted keyboard player Zoot Money, bassist Gary Fletcher and drummer Colin Allen, a line up which became known as the Hard Travelers. In January 2008 the Hard Travelers performed their debut gig at The Cellars in Portsmouth.

In 2008, McCullough recorded Poor Man's Moon at Amberville Studios, which was released only in Ireland on 5 September 2008, and featured new McCullough compositions. The album also included a number of songs co-written with poet Eamon Carr from Horslips and included the single "Too Late to Worry". Among the musicians featured on the album were keyboard player James Delaney, bassists Roe Butcher and Nicky Scott (also double bass), keyboard player Enda Walsh, drummer Adie McIlduff and Percy Robinson on dobro and pedal steel guitar. The album also included drum sequences by Peter McKinney.

At the end of 2007 he worked on the album Dark Nite of the Soul with Jeff Greene, as well as other musical collaborations recorded at Wind-Mill Lane Studios, Dublin; Metropolis Studios, London; and The Sound Kitchen, Nashville. McCullough attended Paul McCartney's concert at the O2 in Dublin on 20 December 2009, and McCartney publicly acknowledged McCullough's contribution to Wings. On 13 March 2010, McCullough and his band were the headline act at the Fifestock Festival at the Inn at Lathones, Scotland.

== 2010s ==
McCullough remained active in the European music scene and played regular live gigs with artists including Ed Deane, James Delaney, Noel Bridgeman, also John Quearney. In 2011 Henry collaborated with songwriter Paul Doherty and the Vals on the track "Look to the One". The song gained worldwide airplay, with McCullough contributing backing vocals and guitar.

== Health problems and death ==
McCullough suffered a heart attack in November 2012, leaving him in critical condition. His death was mistakenly reported on Ronan Collins's RTÉ Radio 1 show on 7 November and the BBC also apologised after prematurely reporting his death. In an interview with website Something Else, Denny Seiwell, who had played with McCullough in Wings, stated that it was doubtful McCullough would make a complete recovery.

On 17 March 2015, a benefit concert for McCullough was held at the Half Moon music venue in Putney, featuring Paul Carrack, Nick Lowe, Andy Fairweather Low, Suggs and Bobby Tench (who also performed with the backing band). The backing band was named Henry's Heroes, and included Tim Hinkley, Mel Collins, Neil Hubbard and John Halsey and bass player Kuma Harada.

On 14 June 2016, his wife Josie confirmed that McCullough had died at his home at Ballywindelland, Ballymoney, County Antrim, earlier that morning after a long illness. He had never fully recovered from the heart attack he suffered in 2012. Some sources state he also suffered a major stroke.

== Discography ==
Solo albums

- Mind Your Own Business (1975)
- All Shook Up (1982; maxi-single)
- Hell of a Record (May 1984)
- Cut (1987)
- Get in the Hole (1989; live recording)
- Blue Sunset (1998)
- Belfast to Boston (2001)
- Unfinished Business (2002)
- The Henry McCullough Band: FBI Live (2007)
- Poor Man's Moon (2008)
- Shabby Road (2012)
- Henry McCullough Band Live at Rockpalast, 1976 (2014)

Other album credits

- Joe Cocker – On Air (1997; recorded 1968)
- Joe Cocker – Joe Cocker! (1969)
- Joe Cocker – With a Little Help from My Friends (1969)
- Andrew Lloyd Webber and Tim Rice – Jesus Christ Superstar (1970)
- Rosetta Hightower – Hightower (1970)
- Spooky Tooth – The Last Puff (1970)
- Linda McCartney – Wide Prairie (1998; recorded 1971)
- The Grease Band – The Grease Band (1971)
- Christopher Kearney – Christopher Kearney (1972)
- Jackie Flavelle – Admission Free (1972)
- Donovan – Essence to Essence (1973)
- Dave Carlsen – Pale Horse (1973)
- Wings – Red Rose Speedway (1973)
- Viola Wills – Soft Centres (1974; re-issued as Without You)
- Andy Fairweather Low – Spider Jiving (1974)
- Joe Cocker – I Can Stand a Little Rain (1974)
- Bobby Harrison – Funkist (1975)
- Joe Cocker – Jamaica Say You Will (1975)
- The Grease Band – Amazing Grease (1975; recorded 1970–71)
- The Frankie Miller Band – The Rock (1975)
- Andrew Lloyd Webber and Tim Rice – Evita (1976)
- Gerry Lockran – Rags to Gladrags (1976)
- Roy Harper – Bullinamingvase (1977; titled One of Those Days in England for U.S. release)
- Steve Ellis – The Last Angry Man (1978; cassette issue)
- Marianne Faithfull – Faithless (1978; re-issued as No Regrets)
- Denny Laine – Japanese Tears (1980)
- Eric Burdon – Darkness Darkness (1980)
- Ronnie Lane – Live at Rock Palast (1980)
- Ronnie Lane – See Me (1980)
- Various Artists – Alive in Belfast – The Warehouse Sessions (1995)
- Roy Harper – Commercial Breaks (1994; recorded 1977)
- Brendan Quinn – Small Town (2001)
- Richard Gilpin – Beautiful Mistake (2002)
- Kevin Doherty – Sweet Water (2002)
- Rev. Neil Down – When a Wrong Turns Right (2003)
- Andy Fairweather Low – Wide Eyed and Legless: The A&M Recordings (2004)
- Tim Hinkley – Hinkley's Heroes (2005)
- The Deans – The Deans (2006)
- Steve Marriott's Allstars – Wham Bam (2007)
- Jeff Greene – Dark Nite of the Soul (2008)
- Brendan Quinn – Sinner Man (2008)
- Joe Cocker – Live at Woodstock (2009)
- Roy Harper – Songs of Love and Loss (2011)
- The Vals – Look to the One (2011)
- Paul McCartney – The Art of McCartney (2014)

Credits on singles

- Gene and The Gents – "Puppet on a String" / "Sweet Little Sixteen" (1965)
- Éire Apparent – "Follow Me" / "Here I Go Again" (1968)
- Wings – "Hi, Hi, Hi" / "C Moon" (1972)
- Wings – "Mary Had a Little Lamb" / "Little Woman Love" (1972)
- Wings – "Give Ireland Back to the Irish" (1972)
- Wings – "Helen Wheels" / "Country Dreamer" (1973) B-side only
- Wings – "Live and Let Die" / "I Lie Around" (1973)
- Wings – "My Love" / "The Mess (Live at The Hague)" (1973)
