= An Introduction to The Moody Blues =

Compilation album by The Moody Blues
- Released: 29 August 2006
- Recorded: 1964 – 1966
- Genre: Rhythm and blues
- Length: 56:33
- Label: Fuel
- Producers: The Moody Blues, Denny Cordell & Alex Murray

The Moody Blues chronology
Lovely to See You: Live (2005)	An Introduction to The Moody Blues (2006)	Live at the BBC: 1967-1970 (2007)

Professional ratings
Review scores
Source	Rating
AllMusic	3.5/5 stars

An Introduction to The Moody Blues is a compilation album by the Moody Blues, led by Denny Laine. It includes all songs from The Magnificent Moodies except "True Story" and "Thank You Baby", but contains other early singles, as well as "People Gotta Go", which was only included on a rare French-only EP.

== Track listing ==
1. "Go Now" (Larry Banks, Milton Bennett) – 3:11
2. "I'll Go Crazy" (James Brown) – 2:09
3. "Something You Got" (Chris Kenner) – 2:51
4. "Can't Nobody Love You" (Philip Mitchel) – 4:01
5. "I Don't Mind" (Brown) – 3:26
6. "Stop" (Denny Laine, Mike Pinder) – 2:04
7. "It Ain't Necessarily So" (George Gershwin, Ira Gershwin) – 3:19
8. "Bye Bye Bird" (Willie Dixon, Sonny Boy Williamson II) – 2:49
9. "Steal Your Heart Away" (Robert Parker) – 2:13
10. "Lose Your Money (But Don't Lose Your Mind)" (Pinder) – 2:00
11. "I Don't Want to Go on Without You" (Bert Berns, Jerry Wexler) – 2:45
12. "Time Is on My Side" (Norman Meade) – 3:02
13. "From the Bottom of My Heart (I Love You)" (Laine, Pinder) – 3:26
14. "Everyday" (Laine, Pinder) – 1:50
15. "This Is My House (But Nobody Calls)" (Laine, Pinder) – 2:35
16. "Life's Not Life" (Laine, Pinder) – 2:33
17. "Boulevard De La Madelaine" (Laine, Pinder) – 2:53
18. "People Gotta Go" (Laine, Pinder) – 2:33

== Personnel ==
- Denny Laine - Guitars, piano, keyboards, vocals
- Ray Thomas - Percussion, bass guitar, keyboards, flute, vocals
- Mike Pinder - Keyboards, Piano, Organ, vocals
- Clint Warwick - Bass guitar, vocals
- Graeme Edge - Drums and percussion

Additional personnel

- Elaine Caswell - Percussion
- Denny Cordell - Co-production
- Alex Murray - Co-production
- Len Fico Project - Coordinator
- Stacie Heyen - Artwork
- Greg Russo - Liner notes, research
- Nick Wright - Photography
