= Corey L. Banks =

American rapper (born 1970)

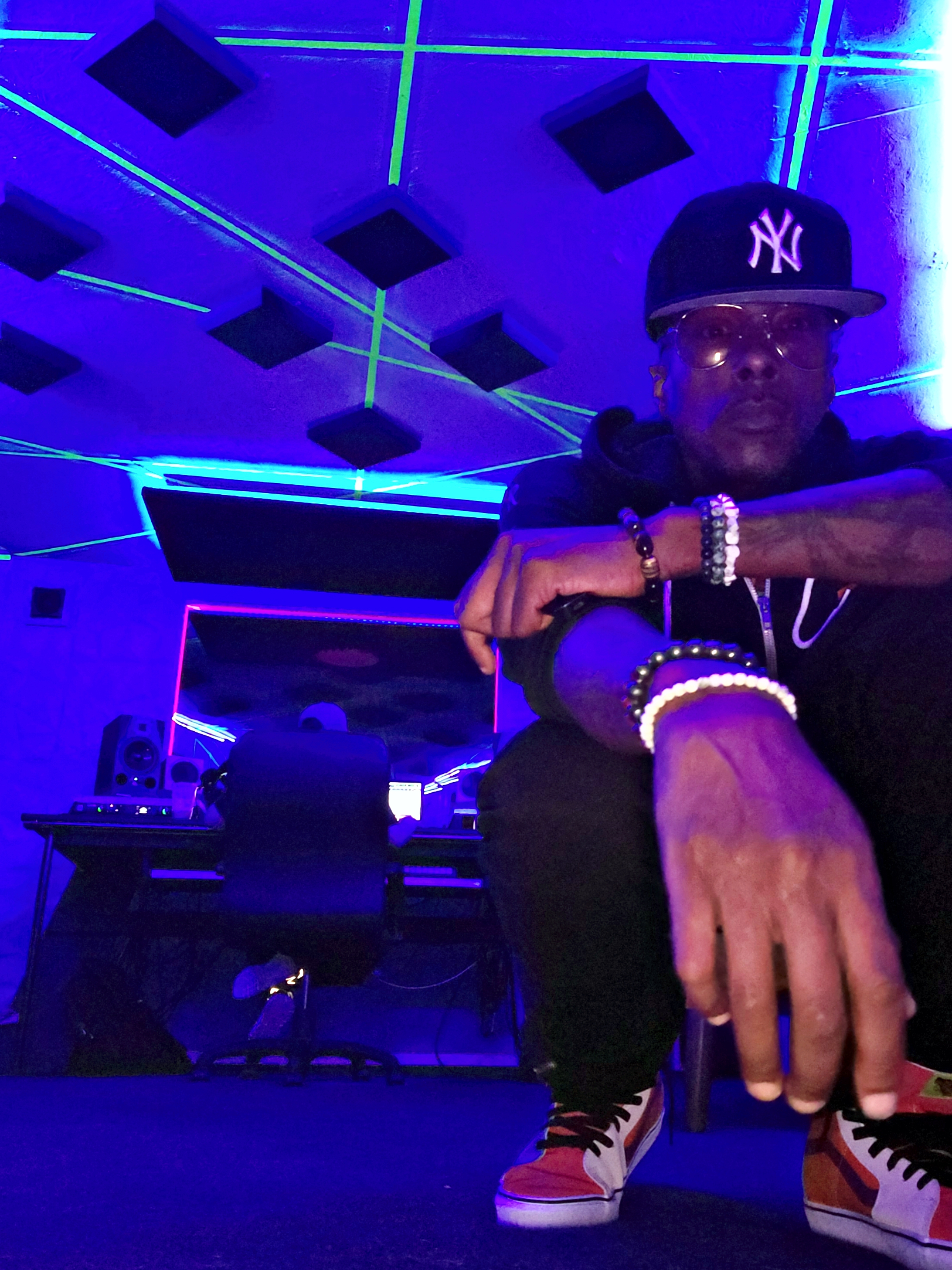
- Corey Drumz in the studio, Los Angeles, CA
- Born: Corey Lawrence Banks; April 9, 1970 (age 55); Jamaica, Queens, U.S.
- Other names: CeStyle; IKEBoy; Corey Drumz
- Occupations: Rapper; songwriter; record producer; fashion designer; entrepreneur
- Years active: 1986–present
- Organizations: Banks Brand Music; Iron Klad Entertainment
- Children: Corey L. Banks, Jr. (Jxly Banks); Jermil Banks (Jayy Gawd); JaDaya Banks (JaDaya Koray); Nahkim Banks
- Parents: Larry Banks (father); Joan Bates (Jaibi) (mother)
- Relatives: Arthur Banks (grandfather); Charles Pulliam Jr. (uncle)
- Musical career
- Origin: Hollis, Queens, U.S.
- Genres: Hip hop
- Instruments: Vocals; sampler; keyboards; drum machine
- Labels: Wild Pitch Records; Dolo Records; Plasma Records; Chopped Herring Records
- Formerly of: Total Pack; Korp Dynasty (The Korp)

Corey Lawrence Banks (born April 9, 1970), is an American rapper and songwriter, currently performing under the name Corey Drumz. When he emerged from the late 1980s Hollis, Queens Hip hop scene, Banks was known professionally as CeStyle. In 1991 he co-founded the group Total Pack with Kamal B Wize.

== Early life and family ==
Banks grew up in Hollis, Queens during the 1970s and 1980s. His father was Larry Banks, who in the 1950s performed with the group The Four Fellows, later writing and producing music under his own name, with one-time wife and singer Bessie Banks, and with later wife and singer Joan Bates (Jaibi). Among many other songs, Larry Banks co-wrote the song "Go Now", initially performed by Bessie Banks and later that same year launching the career of The Moody Blues as their first single. Larry Banks also co-wrote songs that he recorded with Jaibi, including You Got Me and It Was Like a Nightmare. Larry Banks and Jaibi married in 1965 and in 1970 parented son Corey L. Banks.

Rounding out the Banks family entertainment business connections, Larry Banks also had a son with singer and actress Mabel King who they named Larry Jr. (later known by the name Larry King). Joan Bates also came from a musical family; her brother Charles Pulliam Jr. was a working jazz conga player. Later is his career, Corey's father Larry Banks worked for RCA Records and maintained a recording studio, where young Corey remembers seeing Burt Bacharach and James Brown stopping to visit.

== Early musical career ==
As a teenager Banks took an interest in writing rhymes and soon became known for performing as a rapper at house parties in Hollis, Queens and at outdoor "park jams" at Jamaica Park in Jamaica, Queens. The park jams were often led at this time by still-local DJ Irv Gotti, who would sell the park recordings on mixtapes. At 15 years old, Banks appeared as CeStyle the Mic Murderer on early DJ Irv tape, Jamaica Park Tape Volume One, including original raps over the songs "Impeach the President" by the Honey Drippers and "Risin' to the Top" by Keni Burke.

In 1991, Banks paired up with fellow Jamaica Park rapper Kamal B Wize to form the group Total Pack. Both Banks and Wise alternated and shared vocals over beats and samples developed by Banks. Banks was aided in studio craft and given access to equipment at an early age by a Hollis beatmaker and producer named Darryl Crush. Total Pack became known for regular radio appearances on The Stretch Armstrong and Bobbito Show (WKCR, later others) and Wildman Steve (WBAU) Hip hop radio shows. On September 27, 1992, Total Pack performed in the "Hip Hop Showcase" at New York City music club CBGB.

In a 2010 interview Banks said, "Stretch and Bobbito gave us our first shot, beyond just being local, and I've always had the utmost respect towards them for that. They gave us an open door. We didn't need to call ahead or anything. If we wanted to go to the station all we had to do was show up and we were always added to whatever they happened to be doing that night."

In December 1992 the group was featured in the "Unsigned Hype" column in The Source Magazine. In early 1993, Total Pack was signed to Columbia Records. At that time, the group was briefly managed by Sandy Griffin and later by MC Serch, who also was managing Nas, another Stretch Armstrong and Bobbito Show regular who had recently signed to Columbia. The group worked in the studio with producer Charlie Morotta, who knew each other from Total Pack's brief association with the Hit Squad and K-Solo.

During this period, Total Pack traveled and performed in live showcases that included artists from MC Lyte to The Notorious B.I.G. to Wu-Tang Clan. When the Columbia deal collapsed a year later, Banks and Wize parted ways. None of the Total Pack material recorded for Columbia would be released, but live radio versions of songs like "Dead Man's Theory" and "Freak the Notes" have circulated in the underground.

In 1994 Banks signed, without Wize, with Wild Pitch Records, under the CeStyle and Total Pack names. For the Wild Pitch project, Banks worked again with producer Charlie Morotta. This incarnation of Total Pack was given full-page coverage in the October 1995 issue of Rap Pages magazine, also featuring Eguan, who would later be a member of Korp Dynasty. Wild Pitch released two Total Pack songs on the 1994 cassette compilation Wild Pitch Blends, which also featured Gang Starr and O.C. The song "What's the Deal" was about Banks's recent experiences in the music business. The Wild Pitch Total Pack deal was dissolved in the wake of the label losing its distribution agreement with EMI.

== Later musical career ==
Following the Wild Pitch Records experience, Banks performed and recorded under the CeStyle moniker for several more years. He formed a group called Korp Dynasty (a.k.a. The Korp), partnering with Hollis crew Eguan, Legacy, and others. The Korp released a handful of songs in association with Stretch Armstrong and Dolo Records, including appearances on the Armstrong compilations Lesson 1 (1997) and Lesson 2 (1998). The Korp also had a 12" single release through Plasma Records.

In 2014 Banks hosted a streaming Internet radio show called #HoffaAtchaIKEBoy Radio Show, on which Banks interviewed several Hip hop artists including Big Daddy Kane, Prince Po, MC Shan, Grand Daddy I.U., Kangol Kid, Mr Cheeks, and Grand Wizzard Theodore.

Banks released one self-produced album under the name CeStyle, Amnesia. He later changed his performing name to Corey Drumz, and for a period circa 2004, to IKEBoy of Iron Klad Entertainment. Since that period, Banks has mainly performed and released music under the Corey Drumz name, including the album LSB963 (2020) and the songs "Soul’d Off" (2020) and "Purple" (2021).

Corey Banks continues to work as a musical artist and is currently living in Los Angeles, California.
