= Deep Soul Records =

Defunct British record label

Deep Soul Records was a record label established by Dave Godin, David Nathan and Robert Blackmore in the United Kingdom in 1969 to release American soul music singles. A subsidiary of Soul City Records, its release run was limited to six singles between 1968 and 1970. These records are now highly sought after.

The label was re-established by Ace Records in 2016.

== Discography ==
- 9101 Jean Stanback - "I Still Love You" / "If I Ever Needed Love" 7"
- 9102 The Ad Libs - "Giving Up" / "Appreciation" 7"
- 9103 Nickie Lee - "And Black Is Beautiful" / "Faith Within" 7"
- 9104 The Emotions - "Somebody New" / "Bushfire" 7"
- 9105 Jimmy Tig & Louise - "A Love That Never Grows Cold" / "Who Can I Turn To" 7"
- 9106 Roy Hamilton - "Dark End Of The Street" / "100 Years Ago" 7"

== See also ==
- List of record labels
