= Japanese Tears =

Studio album by Denny Laine
- Released: December 6, 1980
- Recorded: March 1973 – June 1980
- Studios: Rock City, Nashville, Startling Studios, Lympne Castle
- Genre: Rock
- Length: 49:09
- Labels: Scratch (UK); Takoma (US)
- Producer: Denny Laine

Denny Laine chronology
Holly Days (1977)	Japanese Tears (1980)	Anyone Can Fly (1982)

Singles from Japanese Tears
- 1. "Japanese Tears" Released: 1980; 2. "Go Now" / "Say You Don't Mind" Released: 1980

Professional ratings
Review scores
Source	Rating
AllMusic	2/5 stars

Japanese Tears is the third album by guitarist Denny Laine, released shortly before the demise of Paul McCartney's band Wings, of which Laine was a member. The album was released in 1980.

== Background ==
In January 1980, Wings planned a tour of Japan. However, upon the band's arrival at the airport in Japan, Paul McCartney was arrested for marijuana possession. The tour was cancelled, and McCartney then decided to release a solo album (McCartney II) instead of touring, putting Wings on hiatus. Laine decided to work on his own solo project, his third since joining Wings. This resulted in assembling an album of partially newly recorded material and partially of the tracks that were recorded in previous years, including the tracks that were recorded by Wings and considered for Wings albums.

Newly recorded songs include the title track which kicked off the project, the Moody Blues' 1965 hit "Go Now", which was originally sung by Laine and which Laine with Wings performed on tour, and a 1967 Laine composition, "Say You Don't Mind", that had become a top-20 UK hit in 1972 for Colin Blunstone.

Some of the songs featured the short-lived Denny Laine Band, which included fellow Wings member Steve Holley on drums, Andy Richards on keyboards and Laine's wife Jo Jo on backing vocals.

The Wings tracks include: "I Would Only Smile" from the Red Rose Speedway sessions, "Send Me the Heart" (co-written with Paul McCartney) from the Venus and Mars sessions and "Weep for Love" from the Back to the Egg sessions.

== Promotion and release ==
The album was preceded by the "Japanese Tears" single in summer of 1980 and UK tour by the newly formed Denny Laine Band.

This album has been re-issued several times, under a variety of titles, on an assortment of labels with identical track listing but different running order:

- The Denny Laine Band – Weep for Love (Toshiba Records, 1983)
- Denny Laine, Paul McCartney & Friends – In Flight (Breakaway Records, 1984)
- Denny Laine – Japanese Tears (Teichiku Records Co., Japanese CD reissue, 1992)
- Denny Laine & Friends – Danger Zone (LaserLight Records, 1995)
- Denny Laine – Go Now (Excerpts) (Prime Cuts, 1995)
- Denny Laine/Paul McCartney – Send Me the Heart (United Audio Entertainment, 2001)
- Denny Laine featuring Paul & Linda McCartney – Spreading My Wings (Cherry Red Records, 2002)
- Denny Laine with Paul McCartney – Send Me the Heart (United Audio Entertainment, 2005)
- Denny Laine with Paul McCartney and friends – Lover's Light (Collectors Dream Records, 2012)

The song "I Would Only Smile" was included as bonus track on the 2018 reissue of Wings album Red Rose Speedway.

== Reception ==
AllMusic gave the album a generally positive retrospective review, calling it "a look at one of rock's minor league players done well." They remarked that the album lacks coherency due to the tracks having been both written and recorded during wildly divergent periods of Laine's career, but found that it nonetheless has "charm", singling out the title track and "Go Now" as highlights.

== Track listing ==
All songs written by Denny Laine, except where noted.

Side one

No.	Title	Year of recording	Length
1.	"Japanese Tears"	1980	4:43
2.	"Danger Zone"	1979	3:06
3.	"Clock on the Wall"	1980	4:41
4.	"Send Me the Heart" (Denny Laine, Paul McCartney)	1974	3:35
5.	"Go Now" (Larry Banks, Milton Bennett)	1980	3:15
6.	"Same Mistakes"	1978	3:41
7.	"Silver"	1978	4:05

Side two

No.	Title	Year of recording	Length
1.	"Say You Don't Mind"	1980	3:08
2.	"Somebody Ought to Know the Way"	1978	3:15
3.	"Lovers Light"	1980	3:01
4.	"Guess I'm Only Fooling"	1978	2:30
5.	"Nothing to Go By"	1978	3:07
6.	"I Would Only Smile"	1973	3:18
7.	"Weep for Love"	1979	4:32

== Personnel ==
The Denny Laine Band

- Denny Laine – guitars, keyboards, piano, vocals
- Jo Jo Laine – backing vocals, lead vocals on "Same Mistakes"
- Gordon Sellar – bass guitar
- Andy Richards – keyboards, piano, organ
- Mike Piggott – violin
- Steve Holley – drums, percussion

Wings

- Denny Laine – guitar, lead vocals (1973, 1974, 1978)
- Paul McCartney – bass, backing vocals (1973, 1974, 1978)
- Linda McCartney – keyboards, backing vocals (1973, 1974, 1978)
- Henry McCullough – guitar (1973)
- Denny Seiwell – drums (1973)
- Jimmy McCulloch – guitar (1974)
- Geoff Britton – drums (1974)
- Laurence Juber – guitar (1978)
- Steve Holley – drums (1978)

Additional personnel

- Howie Casey – saxophone, string arrangement
- Thaddeus Richard – flute
- Ian Hayter – string arrangement
- Nick Smith – engineer
