= Soul City Records (British label) =

British independent record label

Soul City was a British soul independent record label run by Dave Godin, David Nathan and Robert Blackmore, from a record shop of the same name in London. It is not to be confused with the US record label of the same name, run by the singer Johnny Rivers. Its first release was Don Gardener & Dee Dee Ford's "Don't You Worry" in March 1969. The label released a further 18 singles, the biggest hit being Gene Chandler's "Nothing Can Stop Me" which reached Number 41 in the UK Singles Chart. Soul City records were initially distributed by Island Records and then Philips Records. The releases were extremely popular with fans of Northern Soul and Motown music. In the 2000s the name and label design was used by another company to issue Northern Soul records. This company had no connection to the Dave Godin label.

== Discography ==
- SC 101 Don Gardner & Dee Dee Ford - Don't You Worry / I'm Coming Home To Stay 7"
- SC 102 Gene Chandler - Nothing Can Stop Me / The Big Lie 7"
- SC 103 Sylvia - I Can't Help It / It's A Good Life 7"
- SC 104 Chuck Edwards - I Need You / Downtown Soulville 7"
- SC 104DJ Chuck Edwards - Chuck I Need You / Downtown Soulville 7" (DJ Copy)
- SC 105 Bessie Banks - Go Now / It Sounds Like My Baby 7"
- SC 106 The Valentinos - It's All Over Now / Tired Of Living In The Country 7"
- SC 106DJ The Valentinos - It's All Over Now / Tired Of Living In The Country 7" (DJ Copy)
- SC 107 Billy Preston - Greazee / Greazee Part 2 7"
- SC 107DJ Billy Preston - Billy Greazee / Greazee Part 2 7" (DJ Copy)
- SC 108 Shirley Lawson - One More Chance / The Star 7"
- SC 109 Soul City Executives - Happy Chatter / Falling In Love 7"
- SC 110 Thelma Jones - The House That Jack Built / Give It To Me Straight 7"
- SC 111 The Packers - Hole In The Wall / Go Ahead On 7"
- SC 112 Chris Jackson - I'll Never Forget You / Forever I'll Stay With You 7"
- SC 113 Billy Butler - The Right Track / Boston Monkey 7"
- SC 114 Major Lance - The Beat / You'll Want Me Back 7"
- SC 115 Mighty Sam - Papa True Love / I Need A Lot Of Lovin' 7"
- SC 116 Chuck Brooks - Black Sheep / I've Got To Get Myself Together 7"
- SC 117 The Staple Singers - For What It's Worth / Are you Sure 7"
- SC 118 Erma Franklin - Don't Wait Too Long / Time After Time 7"
- SC 119 Allen Toussaint - We The People / Tequilla 7"
- SC 120 Chris Jackson - Since There's No Doubt / We Will Be Together 7" (Unissued)

== See also ==
- List of record labels
- Soul City Records
