= The Magnificent Moodies =

1965 debut studio album by the Moody Blues

Studio album by the Moody Blues
- Released: 23 July 1965
- Recorded: October 1964 – March 1965
- Genre: Beat
- Length: 34:23
- Label: Decca
- Producers: Denny Cordell; Alex Wharton

The Moody Blues chronology
The Magnificent Moodies (1965)	Days of Future Passed (1967)

The Magnificent Moodies is the 1965 debut album by British rock band the Moody Blues, released on Decca Records.

== Background ==
The Magnificent Moodies is the only album by the original line-up of Denny Laine (vocals/guitar), Clint Warwick (bass/vocals), Mike Pinder (keyboards/vocals), Ray Thomas (flute/harmonica/percussion/vocals) and Graeme Edge (drums). Lead vocals were shared by Laine, Pinder and Thomas. The album is a mix of rhythm and blues covers, including "Go Now" which had been a Number 1 hit single for the band earlier that year, and original songs by Laine and Pinder which show more of a Merseybeat influence. Also included is a cover of the George and Ira Gershwin standard "It Ain't Necessarily So".

The album was produced by Denny Cordell, with the exception of "Go Now" which was produced by Alex Wharton. In-between "Go Now" and The Magnificent Moodies the band had released two more singles, "I Don't Want to Go On Without You" and "From the Bottom of My Heart", neither of which were included on the album. For the American and Canadian release on London Records, with the title Go Now: The Moody Blues #1, four songs were replaced with those two preceding singles and two B-sides, with a different running order of the tracks. One of the tracks that was replaced, "Stop", was released as a single in America and Canada later that year. The American and Canadian album also titled three of the songs incorrectly ("I'll Go Crazy" became "I Go Crazy", "I've Got a Dream" became "I Had a Dream" and "Bye Bye Bird" became "Bye Bye Burd").

Professional ratings
Review scores
Source	Rating
AllMusic	3/5 stars
Record Mirror	4/5 stars

== Release history ==
The sleeve notes on the back cover of the original UK release include an (undated) review by Virginia Ironside, music critic of the Daily Mail, which concludes, "With the Moody Blues, all you need to write is "MAGNIFICENT" in pink lipstick and leave it at that". A specially-written prose poem by Donovan recommending the band was also included. The Donovan poem was also included on the back cover of the US release.

The band held a launch party for the album, with guests including George Harrison, Paul McCartney, Marianne Faithfull and Sandie Shaw.

The album did not make the Record Retailer/Music Week chart even though it reached number 5 in August 1965 in the New Musical Express album chart. The US album did not make the Billboard chart. It did however reach number 8 in Finland during the spring of 1966.

After the album's release, the band issued two further non-album singles, "Everyday" in October 1965 and "Boulevard de la Madeleine" in June 1966 (in the US, the B-side of the latter, "This is My House (But Nobody Calls)", was the A-side). Warwick left the group in July 1966, and was replaced by Rod Clark on bass for a few months before he and Laine both departed in October 1966. One track recorded with Clark, "Life's Not Life", was released as a single in January 1967, by which time Edge, Pinder and Thomas had recruited new members Justin Hayward (guitar/vocals) and John Lodge (bass/vocals). The new line-up would release two more singles during 1967 – "Fly Me High" in May and "Love and Beauty" in September – before releasing the Moody Blues' second album Days of Future Passed in November that year.

At the height of The Moody Blues' U.S. success in 1970, Deram Records reissued the US version of the album with a new cover and title, In the Beginning (DES-18051). As with the original album, the reissue did not chart.

In 1976, a double compilation album entitled A Dream, which included the entire Magnificent Moodies album as well as single A- and B- sides from the pre-Days of Future Passed 1964 to 1967 period, was issued in much of western Europe, but only available on import in the UK.

Decca Records UK first issued The Magnificent Moodies on CD in 1988 with 13 bonus tracks, with mastering by Anthony Hawkins. Repertoire Records issued an abridged version of the CD in 1992 with only 7 bonus tracks. In 2006 the CD was reissued again, this time with 14 bonus tracks including the rare "People Gotta Go" not found on the 1988 Decca version. The CD also included, for the first time, a speed-corrected and undistorted version of "Go Now". The 2006 Repertoire CD was remastered by Eroc, who was the leader of the 1970s German rock band Grobschnitt.

== Track listing ==
=== British version (The Magnificent Moodies) ===
All lead vocals by Denny Laine except where noted.

Side one
No.	Title	Writer(s)	Lead Vocal(s)	Length
1.	"I'll Go Crazy"	James Brown		2:13
2.	"Something You Got"	Chris Kenner		2:49
3.	"Go Now!"	Larry Banks, Milton Bennett		3:14
4.	"Can't Nobody Love You"	James Mitchell		4:06
5.	"I Don't Mind"	Brown	Mike Pinder	3:26
6.	"I've Got a Dream"	Jeff Barry, Ellie Greenwich	Laine and Clint Warwick	2:50

Side two
No.	Title	Writer(s)	Lead Vocal(s)	Length
1.	"Let Me Go"	Laine, Pinder		3:14
2.	"Stop"	Laine, Pinder		2:05
3.	"Thank You Baby"	Laine, Pinder		2:30
4.	"It Ain't Necessarily So"	George Gershwin, Ira Gershwin	Ray Thomas	3:21
5.	"True Story"	Laine, Pinder		1:46
6.	"Bye Bye Bird"	Sonny Boy Williamson II, Willie Dixon		2:49
Total length:				34:23

=== American and Canadian version (Go Now: The Moody Blues #1) ===
Go Now: The Moody Blues #1

Studio album by The Moody Blues
- Released: 28 July 1965
- Recorded: October 1964 – March 1965
- Genre: Beat
- Length: 34:03
- Label: London
- Producers: Denny Cordell; Alex Murray

Side one
No.	Title	Writer	Length
1.	"I'll Go Crazy (mistitled "I Go Crazy")"	Brown	2:08
2.	"And My Baby's Gone"	Laine, Pinder	2:15
3.	"Go Now!"	Banks, Bennett	3:10
4.	"It's Easy Child"	Kay Bennett, Sue Sandler, Gene Redd	3:10
5.	"Can't Nobody Love You"	Mitchell	4:00
6.	"I've Got a Dream (mistitled "I Had a Dream")"	Barry, Greenwich	2:50

Side two
No.	Title	Writer	Length
1.	"Let Me Go"	Laine, Pinder	3:08
2.	"I Don't Want to Go On Without You"	Bert Berns, Jerry Wexler	2:45
3.	"True Story"	Laine, Pinder	1:40
4.	"It Ain't Necessarily So"	G. Gershwin, I. Gershwin	2:47
5.	"Bye Bye Bird (mistitled "Bye Bye Burd")"	Williamson, Dixon	2:50
6.	"From the Bottom of My Heart"	Laine, Pinder	3:20
Total length:			34:03

=== 50th Anniversary Editions ===
On 15 December 2014, Esoteric Recordings issued a single CD version (ECLEC 2474) as well as a double CD deluxe version (ECLEC 22473) of the album in honor of the Moody Blues' 50th anniversary and the album's upcoming 50th anniversary. The single CD version and the first CD from the double CD version are identical and both versions utilize the original UK album artwork.

The single CD version and the first CD on the double CD version comprises the complete discography of the original 1964–1966 line-up of the Moody Blues. Tracks 1–12 are the original British Magnificent Moodies album, while the remaining tracks are single A- and B-sides and EP tracks. It also includes a previously unreleased early take of "Go Now".

Tracks 1–7 on the second CD are a previously unreleased demo session on 24 July 1964, tracks 8–19 are from the BBC's Saturday Club radio sessions in 1965, track 20 is a Coca-Cola commercial the band recorded in 1965 and the remaining tracks are previously unreleased 1966 recordings for a proposed second album.

All tracks are in mono except for tracks 21–29 on CD 2, which are in stereo.

CD 1
No.	Title	Length
1.	"I'll Go Crazy"	2:12
2.	"Something You Got"	2:53
3.	"Go Now"	3:13
4.	"Can't Nobody Love You?"	4:03
5.	"I Don't Mind"	3:28
6.	"I've Got a Dream"	3:28
7.	"Let Me Go"	3:13
8.	"Stop"	2:06
9.	"Thank You Baby"	2:29
10.	"It Ain't Necessarily So"	3:21
11.	"True Story"	1:45
12.	"Bye Bye Bird"	2:54
13.	"Lose Your Money (But Don't Lose Your Mind)" (single A-side, 1964)	2:00
14.	"Steal Your Heart Away" (single B-side ("Lose Your Money"), 1964)	2:15
15.	"Go Now!" (first version recorded 1964, previously unreleased)	3:49
16.	"It's Easy Child" (single B-side ("Go Now"), 1964)	2:54
17.	"I Don't Want to Go on Without You" (single A-side, 1965)	2:47
18.	"Time Is on My Side" (single B-side ("I Don't Want to Go on Without You"), 1965)	3:04
19.	"From the Bottom of My Heart (I Love You)" (single A-side, 1965)	3:27
20.	"And My Baby's Gone" (single B-side ("From the Bottom of My Heart"), 1965)	2:22
21.	"Everyday" (single A-side, 1965)	1:49
22.	"You Don't (All The Time)" (single B-side ("Everyday"), 1965)	2:22
23.	"Boulevard de la Madeleine" (single A-side, 1966)	2:55
24.	"This Is My House (But Nobody Calls)" (single B-side ("Boulevard de la Madeleine"), 1966)	2:35
25.	"People Gotta Go" (France-only Boulevard de la Madeleine EP, 1966)	2:36
26.	"Life's Not Life" (single A-side, recorded 1966, released 1967)	2:36
27.	"He Can Win" (single B-side ("Life's Not Life"), recorded 1966, released 1967)	2:25
Total length:		75:01

CD 2 (all tracks previously unreleased)
No.	Title	Length
1.	"Go Now!" (second version, 1964)	3:54
2.	"Lose Your Money (But Don't Lose Your Mind)" (early version, 1964)	2:04
3.	"Steal Your Heart Away" (early version, 1964)	2:20
4.	"I'll Go Crazy" (first version, 1964)	2:12
5.	"You Better Move On" (recorded 1964)	4:00
6.	"Can't Nobody Love You" (first version, 1964)	3:32
7.	"23rd Psalm" (recorded 1964)	2:34
8.	"Go Now" (Saturday Club radio session, 1965)	3:12
9.	"I Don't Want To Go on Without You" (Saturday Club radio session, 1965)	2:44
10.	"I'll Go Crazy" (Saturday Club radio session, 1965)	1:58
11.	"From The Bottom of My Heart (I Love You)" (Saturday Club radio session, 1965)	3:25
12.	"Jump Back" (Saturday Club radio session, 1965)	2:42
13.	"I've Got A Dream" (Saturday Club radio session, 1965)	2:42
14.	"And My Baby's Gone" (Saturday Club radio session, 1965)	2:16
15.	"It's Easy Child" (Saturday Club radio session, 1965)	3:06
16.	"Stop" (Saturday Club radio session, 1965)	1:58
17.	"Everyday" (Saturday Club radio session, 1965)	1:41
18.	"Interview with Ray Thomas and Graeme Edge / You Don't (All The Time)" (Saturday Club radio session, 1965)	3:25
19.	"I Want You to Know" (Saturday Club radio session, 1965)	1:52
20.	"Coca Cola Commercial" (recorded 1965)	1:05
21.	"Sad Song" (recorded 1966)	2:21
22.	"This Is My House (But Nobody Calls)" (first version, 1966)	2:47
23.	"How Can We Hang on to a Dream" (first version, 1966)	2:17
24.	"How Can We Hang on to a Dream" (remake, 1966)	2:22
25.	"Jago & Jilly" (recorded 1966)	2:45
26.	"We're Broken" (recorded 1966)	3:12
27.	"I Really Haven't Got the Time" (early version, 1966)	3:18
28.	"Red Wine" (recorded 1966)	2:59
29.	"This Is My House (But Nobody Calls)" (stereo mix, 1966)	2:25
Total length:		77:08

== Personnel ==
Personnel taken from the album's liner notes.

The Moody Blues

- Denny Laine – vocals, guitars, harmonica
- Mike Pinder – piano, vocals
- Ray Thomas – flutes, maracas, harmonica, tambourine, vocals
- Clint Warwick – bass guitar, vocals
- Graeme Edge – drums

Additional personnel

- Elaine Caswell – percussion

Technical personnel

- Denny Cordell – producer
- A. Wharton – producer ("Go Now")
- Nicholas Wright – photographer (UK issue)
- Shirley Scott-James – designer (UK issue)
- Donovan, Virginia Ironside – sleeve notes (UK issue)

== Charts ==
Chart (1965–1966)	Peak position
Finnish Albums (The Official Finnish Charts)	8
French Albums (SNEP)	60

== Release history ==
Date	Label	Format	Country	Catalog	Notes
23 July 1965	Decca	LP	UK	LK 4711	Original release.
1970	Decca	LP	UK	LK 4711	Repress of the original release.
1988	London	CD	US	820 758-2	Original CD release including thirteen bonus tracks.
1 June 1989	London	CD	Japan	P25L-25026	
10 July 2006	Repertoire	CD	UK	REP 5077	Reissue including fourteen bonus tracks.
15 July 2006	Air Mail Archive	CD	Japan	AIRAC-1228	Reissue including seven bonus tracks.
2007	The Great American Music Company	CD	US	085 350 063 3	Reissue missing "Bye Bye Bird," includes five bonus tracks.
15 December 2014	Esoteric Recordings	CD	Europe	ECLEC 22473	50th anniversary deluxe edition.
15 December 2014	Esoteric Recordings	CD	Europe	ECLEC 2474	Reissue including fifteen bonus tracks.
18 April 2015	Esoteric Recordings	LP	Europe	ECLECLP 2474	Reissue of the original release.
