= The Four Fellows =

- From top left clockwise: Teddy Williams, Jim McGowan, David Jones, Larry Banks

Background information
- Also known as: The Schemers
- Origin: Brooklyn, New York, United States
- Genres: Doo-wop; R&B
- Years active: 1953-1957 (one-off reunion: 1979)
- Labels: Derby; Glory
- Past members: David Jones; Larry Banks; Jimmy McGowan; Jimmy Beckum; Teddy Williams; Jimmy Mobley; Gordon Payne; Alvin Scott

The Four Fellows were an American doo-wop group formed in Brooklyn, New York, in 1953. The combo possessed a more polished and professional style than much of their regional contemporaries, reflecting upon influences from gospel and barbershop music. In the Four Fellows' recording career, they underwent multiple line-up changes with lead singer Jimmy McGowan remaining the sole consistent member of the group until it disbanded in 1956. The group released several singles, but their one and only national hit came in 1955, with the distribution of "Soldier Boy", a Top 10 song on the Billboard R&B charts.

== History ==
The group came together in 1953 when David Jones (tenor) and Larry Banks (bass), both of whom had recently returned from combat in the Korean War, convinced Jimmy McGowan (second tenor) to resume his singing career. McGowan had spent time with the vocal group the Four Toppers, but was forced to break up that band when he was hospitalized with an illness. With Jimmy Beckum (lead vocalist) also involved, the group formed the Schemers. The band members came from varying backgrounds and influences in the music industry: Beckum sang in the gospel group the Brooklyn Crusaders, and Jones and Banks spent time in barbershop acts. After a few public appearances, Beckum left the Schemers, but was soon replaced with Teddy Williams, with whom McGowan had worked during his stint with the Four Toppers.

Thereafter, the group adopted a style inspired by the Mills Brothers, which emphasized collective vocalization rather than an identifiable frontman backed by harmony singers. By 1954, their manager Jimmy Johnson renamed the Schemers to the Four Fellows, in the belief that the new moniker would sound more professional for their upcoming performance on Ralph Cooper's television program Spotlight on Harlem. Later in the year, Johnson orchestrated a recording contract with Derby Records, leading to the Four Fellows debut single "I Tried" paired with "Bend on the River". The single was a commercial disappointment, which lead to the swift ousting of Johnson from his managerial role. He was replaced by Teddy "Cherokee" Conyer, a former saxophonist for Buddy Johnson. An agreement between Conyer and record producer Phil Rose placed the Four Fellows on Rose's newly established label Glory Records.

In 1955, the Four Fellows released a pair of singles, "I Wish I Didn't Love You" and "So Will I", the latter of which partnered the combo with blues singer Bette McLaurin. Finally, a breakthrough came for the group when Rose, who rejected every other song the Four Fellows offered, choose Jones's composition "Soldier Boy". In July 1955, "Soldier Boy" was released, and became a smash R&B hit, reaching number four on the Billboard R&B charts, where it lingered for 15 weeks. Following the single's success, the band made regular appearances at the Apollo Theatre and Brooklyn Paramount Theatre, sharing the bill with the Moonglows, the Nutmegs, and Bo Diddley. A tour in the Midwest followed, reaching its peak with a performance at the Regal Theater in Chicago.

More singles were released in 1955 and 1956, including "Angels Say," "In the Rain," "Darling You," and "Please Play My Song", but none of the records neared the commercial success of "Soldier Boy". For the Four Fellows' final single, "You're Still in My Heart", the group was accompanied by singer Bessie White, who Banks married. In April 1956, Jones left to work with Hal Miller, and was replaced by Jimmy Mobley in time to appear on the "Please Play My Song" single. By the end of 1956, McGowan stood alone as the only original member, recruiting Gordon Payne and Alvin Scott to record an album with Josh White before disbanding in 1957. Banks enjoyed success in the music industry as a record producer and songwriter, penning the song "Go Now" for Bessie White. Although it was not a big hit, a cover version by the Moody Blues reached national audiences in the United States and England.

The "Soldier Boy" line-up performed for the last time together at a benefit for the United in Group Harmony Association (UGHA) in May 1979. In 1980, the UGHA released a live version of "Soldier Boy" on its own independent label. At the eighth annual UGHA hall of fame event in 1998, McGowan represented the Four Fellows to perform "Soldier Boy" with the a cappella group the Sheps.
