= Nozstock: The Hidden Valley =

Arts and music festival in England

Nozstock The Hidden Valley
- Genre: Acoustic, alt country, Americana, blues, burlesque, cabaret, cinema, comedy, drum 'n' bass, dub, dubstep, electro, folk, house, indie, psytrance, reggae, rock, ska, theatre
- Dates: 18-21 July 2024
- Locations: Bromyard, Herefordshire
- Years active: 1998–2024
- Website: www.nozstock.com

Nozstock The Hidden Valley was an annual boutique independent music festival in England, hosting ten stages of live music and acoustic stages, DJ stages, a hip-hop stage, a psytrance stage, one theatre and cabaret tent, one comedy tent which becomes an electro swing speakeasy after dark, a cinema tent, as well as a roaming spoken word tent and circus, fire and performance walkabout acts. It was hosted at Rowden Paddocks Farm near Bromyard, Herefordshire, and took place towards the end of July.

Nozstock The Hidden Valley was a member of the Association of Independent Festivals. Since being founded in 1998 as a barbecue at the home of the Nosworthy family, who are long-term residents of Bromyard in Herefordshire, it grew with volunteer assistance, from friends, family and members of the public, to a final capacity of 5000.

Despite the festival's success, co-founder Ella Nosworthy said in July 2019 they had no plans to expand the festival beyond its 5000 capacity, in order to keep with the principles which had guided the festival to date.

Nozstock was not held in 2020 or 2021 due to the COVID-19 pandemic. The 2021 edition, as well as other British music festivals, was cancelled due to the lack of a government insurance scheme for live events.

In early 2024, it was confirmed by the organisers that the 2024 edition would be the final year for Nozstock. It took place from 18-21 July of that year.

== 2023 Lineup ==
2023's line-up included Fat Freddy's Drop, The Wailers, Shy FX, David Rodigan, General Levy, DJ Marky + GQ, Hospitality presents...S.P.Y ft Lowqui, Leeroy Thornhill, Eva Lazarus, Gardna, Beans on Toast, and Mefjus ft. Maksim.

== 2019 Lineup ==
2019's line-up included Rudimental, Soul II Soul, Sleaford Mods, The Skatalites, David Rodigan, Reginald D. Hunter, Hollie Cook, Prince Fatty & Horseman, Kings of the Rollers, Turno, Randall, Danny Byrd, Ed Solo, Oh My God! It's The Church and Elvana.

== Past Performers ==
Previous lineups have included Chase & Status, Goldfrapp, Grandmaster Flash, DJ Marky, De La Soul (who replaced Wu-Tang Clan at short notice), Jurassic 5, Imelda May, Foreign Beggars, Gentleman's Dub Club, Goldie, Seasick Steve, Friction, Martha Reeves and The Vandellas, Beardyman, Congo Natty, Fuse ODG, Hollie Cook, Ed Solo, Dynamite MC, London Elektricity, Beans On Toast, Mr. B The Gentleman Rhymer, Molotov Jukebox, Disco Panther, The Electric Swing Circus, Roots Manuva, Jake Bugg, DJ Yoda, Craig Charles, Fun Lovin' Criminals, James Zabiela The Scratch Perverts, The Strypes, Two Door Cinema Club, Chas & Dave, Dub Pistols, the Blockheads with Phill Jupitus, Krafty Kuts, Jack Beats, Caspa, Rusko, Andy C, the Stanton Warriors, Sub Focus, High Contrast, Sonny Wharton, Eddy Temple Morris, Ben Howard, Mr. B The Gentleman Rhymer, The Skints. Sonic Boom Six, The Mouse Outfit feat Dr. Syntax and Sparkz, the Buzzcocks, The Beat, Dizraeli & The Small Gods, Pete & the Pirates, Gabby Young & Other Animals, Pulled Apart By Horses, the Joy Formidable, The Wurzels, The Proclaimers Hayseed Dixie, David Rodigan, Prince Fatty & Horseman, Rudimental and DJ Turno.

The comedy stage has hosted names such as Reginald D. Hunter, Seann Walsh, Russell Howard, Henning Wehn, Richard Herring, Howard Marks, Josh Widdicombe, Cardinal Burns, Phil Kay, The Rubberbandits, Brendan Burns, Devvo, Charlie Chuck, Stephen Frost of Whose Line is it Anyway? fame.

== Stages ==
The festival was run over ten stages: live music and acoustic stages, DJ stages, a hip-hop stage, a psytrance stage, one theatre and cabaret tent, one comedy tent, a cinema tent, as well as a roaming spoken word tent and circus, fire and performance walkabout acts. Stage descriptions are taken from the Nozstock website.

=== Orchard Stage ===
Orchard Stage is Nozstock's main stage. It showcases local acts, new acts across England, and more established acts. The stage also showcases bands from around the world performing a range of genres, including rock, indie, ska, hip-hop, and world percussion.

=== Garden Stage ===
The Garden Stage hosts a diverse and eclectic brew of bands and DJs providing alternative sounds. This stage spans all genres from throbbing dance, funk, and hip hop, to blues, rock and acoustic musings. At the right time, you might even hear a burst of opera. Ideally situated on the hillside overlooking the Farm’s lake, with the Garden Bar just around the corner, this is the perfect spot to sit in the sun and wet your whistle to beautifully blended guitar riffs, stoking the fires for a late night dance to some filthy electronic beats.

=== Bandstand ===
Standing proud at the hilltop of the Dingle is the Bandstand. Hosting a variety of eclectic sounds, its philosophy is to bring diverse, unsigned and experimental acts to the stage. This stage is perfect for those looking for a comfy sofa to chill with a beer, hoping to source new music. Tucked into its own area on the far side of the Dingle, the Bandstand creates an atmosphere all of its own. When Phill Jupitus visited Nozstock : The Hidden Valley, this was said to be his favourite stage.

=== Cubicles ===
Pulsing with whompin' basslines through the night to the wee hours of the morn, Nozstock’s largest dance arena is a converted cowshed run by their musical prodigies, Dex, Octo-pi & Koncept. This dance arena houses deep and dirty drum ‘n’ bass. Cubicles revelers will be treated to the heart shaking bass and breaks of local resident talents alongside some of the most skillful world-renowned turntablists from the DJ establishment.

=== Coppice ===
Psytrance stalwarts Tribe of Frog return to Nozstock to bring deep beats into The Coppice all weekend long. Euphoric, luminous and with an incredible attention to detail, this beautiful spot within the festival, run by these tried and trusted promoters with their finger on the pulse of their audience, brings regulars back year after year.

=== The Altered State ===
In a post-coup land where citizens have been left to piece together their own rules of engagement, incredible practitioners of theatre, circus and craft work have moved in to make the Altered State the new epicentre of play and surreal expression at Noz. By day expect the unexpected – games, workshops, impromptu paint fights at The Sunken Yard – and by night party on with fire shows, disco tunes and madcap roaming performances. The Altered State is yours for the taking; come and make your mark…

=== The Laughing Stock ===
The Laughing Stock is Nozstocks comedy tent, located in the Altered State. Open during the day and evening so pop in and Laughing Stock hosts a mixture stand-up, sketch shows, improv groups and everything surreal and bizarre. Previous years have seen Russell Howard, Phill Jupitus, The Rubberbandits, Devvo, Josh Widdicombe, Cardinal Burns, Stephen Frost and Phil Kay all doing star turns.

=== Little Wonderland Kids Area ===
Nozstock we embrace the whole family festival experience: this means you will find great activities and entertainment for all. Our children’s space is a friendly welcoming environment for both parents and littles alike. All are welcome to get creative, be amazed by wondrous stories, sculptures and entertainment, or roll your sleeves up for some physical fun – because we know that engaged minds and fingers mean happy kids, who will leave with a whole heap of things they have made, and magic moments that they will never forget. All events and activities are free of charge in the kids area, we strongly believe families shouldn't foot the bill for festival fun. We even offer a free bottle warming service!

=== Elephant's Grave ===
2017 welcomed a brand new area to Nozstock, Elephant’s Grave. Set just below the Garden Bar and adjacent to Lake Shepherd, Elephant’s Grave is a haven for dub and reggae in the daytime and house and techno after dark…. Set

=== The Cabinet of Lost Secrets ===
Shortlisted for the AIF Festival Award ‘Most Unique Arena 2015’, The Cabinet of Lost Secrets returns, bringing you a fifth slice of weirdness at Nozstock the Hidden Valley. Surprises, characters and dancing await you in this strange underground lair! Expect the unexpected! Get properly ‘funked up’ with live funk & world rhythms; explore experimental electronica; bathe yourself in unusual performance and pop ups; love our DJ funksters spinning from the caravan, and remember to keep an eye out for the secrets…

=== The Bullpen ===
Nozstock’s original dance arena was a former bull pen and working milking parlour. It was converted long ago into an intimate space for musicians and music lovers. The walls shake with the reverberations of dirty bass beats and vibrant party rhythms. On an endless pilgrimage into the vast spectrum of sound, many a ‘Stocker will be seen bouncing to the darkest beats thanks to the magical hands of some super-skilled DJs. Previous hosts staging beastly takeovers include Sika Studios, UK hip hop collective bringing some of the skankiest riddims to the scene, Reggae Roast showing what’s great about good-time, bouncin’ reggae rhythms and The Blast bringing a mixed bag of bassy wonder.

=== The Sunken Yard ===
Nestled in the rolling hills of the hidden valley, obscured by a heady cloud of powder paint and dust from dancing feet, stands The Sunken Yard; a world away from reality… After their epic past two years at Noz, these connoisseurs of a good time are back, bigger and better than ever, to take up residency as key players in their new adopted land; and this year, for the first time, they are curating a line-up with some of our favourite promoters from up and down the country.

=== Wrong Directions Cinetent ===
Head in the Wrong Directions Cinetent to be entertained, amused, confused and inspired. Open throughout the whole weekend, the Wrong Directions Cinetent is an audio-visual sanctuary for the weary traveller. Re-energise your mind with informative and provocative documentaries; immerse yourself in cinema classics; reset your cultural compass with an array of quality shorts; and be hypnotised by an eclectic selection of experimental works.

== Awards and nominations ==
=== UK Festival Awards ===
- A Greener Festival Award - Commended (2014)
- A Greener Festival Award - Commended(2013)
- Nominated: Best Dance Event (2013)
- Nominated: Best Small Festival (2010)
- Nominated: Family Festival Award (2010)
- Nominated: Best Dance Event (2010)
- Nominated: Best Toilets (2010)
