= Reborn (Denny Laine album) =

Studio album by Denny Laine
- Released: 1996
- Recorded: 1995–96
- Genre: Soft rock
- Labels: Griffin Music (US); Scratch (UK)
- Producers: Denny Laine, Nick Smith

Denny Laine chronology
All I Want is Freedom (1990)	Reborn (1996)	Wings at the Speed of Denny Laine (1996)

Professional ratings
Review scores
Source	Rating
AllMusic	3/5 stars

Reborn is the tenth solo studio album from Denny Laine. It is his last all-original release until 2001. It was reissued in 2001 as Reborn...Again by The Store for Music with bonus tracks.

Denny became friends with local property developer John Ashworth in Rossendale, Lancashire and they built a recording studio in the basement of John’s home in Whalley - Bramley Meade - which was a former maternity hospital.

The cover photo of Reborn is Denny standing in the entrance to Bramley Meade, with John Ashworth’s Bentley parked outside.

Denny also wrote the songs for a musical titled Arctic Song which was performed by the students of Stonyhurst College where John Ashworth’s two sons attended.

Arctic Song was released on CD in 1998 but wasn’t widely publicised. Denny performed all the songs on the CD.

== Track listing ==
All tracks composed by Denny Laine, except where noted

No.	Title	Length
1.	"In Time"	5:35
2.	"Reborn"	3:59
3.	"Rollin' Tide"	5:18
4.	"Night Walker"	4:22
5.	"Hard Labour"	5:05
6.	"Misty Mountain"	4:52
7.	"Fanfare"	4:52
8.	"Within Walls"	4:29
9.	"Eternal Quest"	5:29
10.	"Phoenix"	5:33
Total length:		49:14

Bonus tracks on Reborn...Again

No.	Title	Writer(s)	Length
11.	"Go Now"		3:23
12.	"Time to Hide"		4:39
13.	"Again & Again & Again"		3:45
14.	"Mull of Kintyre"	Denny Laine, Paul McCartney	4:21

== Personnel ==
- Denny Laine
- Alan Wormold, Chip Hawkes, Gary Roberts, Jackie Bodimead - backing vocals

Technical

- Brian Adams - executive producer
- David Simmonds - cover photography
