= Help Me (Sonny Boy Williamson II song) =

Blues standard

Single by Sonny Boy Williamson II
- B-side: "Bye Bye Bird"
- Released: 1963
- Recorded: Chicago, January 11, 1963
- Genre: Blues
- Length: 3:07
- Label: Checker (no. 1036)
- Songwriter(s): Sonny Boy Williamson II; Willie Dixon; Ralph Bass
- Producer(s): Leonard Chess; Phil Chess; Willie Dixon

Sonny Boy Williamson II singles chronology
"One Way Out" / "Nine Below Zero" (1962)	"Help Me" (1963)	"Trying to Get Back on My Feet" / "Decoration Day" (1963)

"Help Me" is a blues standard first recorded by Sonny Boy Williamson II in 1963. The song, a mid-tempo twelve-bar blues, is credited to Williamson, Willie Dixon, and Ralph Bass and is based on the 1962 instrumental hit "Green Onions" by Booker T. and the MGs. "Help Me" became a hit in 1963 and reached number 24 in the Billboard R&B chart.

The song was later included on the 1966 Williamson compilation More Folk Blues. In 1987, "Help Me" was inducted into the Blues Foundation Hall of Fame in the "Classic of Blues Recordings" category. It is featured on many Sonny Boy Williamson greatest hits albums including His Best.
