= Bette McLaurin =

American singer (born 1929)

- Born: December 6, 1929; North Carolina, U.S.
- Genres: Jazz; R&B
- Occupation: Singer
- Years active: 1950–c. 1971
- Label: Derby Coral

Bette McLaurin (born December 6, 1929) is an American singer best known for her jazz-influenced ballad and R&B performances in the 1950s. Two of her recordings, "I May Hate Myself In The Morning" (1952) and "Only A Rose" (1953) reached the Billboard pop charts.

McLaurin was born in North Carolina on December 6, 1929. She studied classical music and aspired to become a concert singer, before her mother persuaded her to start a career in popular music. Bette had one sister and no brothers In 1950 she made her first recording, "Crying My Heart Out Over You", with the Claude Hopkins Orchestra for Big Nickel Records, a small R&B label. By 1952, the company had folded and she recorded the first of six singles for Derby Records in New York City. Her first recording for the label was "I May Hate Myself In The Morning", written by Bennie Benjamin and George Weiss, and recorded with the Rex Kearney Orchestra. The song rapidly became a hit, reaching no.23 on the national pop chart, a remarkable achievement at the time for an "R&B-tinged" record on an independent label. She toured in the US and Canada with The Ink Spots, and her follow-up record, "My Heart Belongs to Only You", with vocal group the Striders, was also a success.

By the end of 1952 she signed with the Coral label, a subsidiary of Decca Records, and appeared at the Apollo Theater. The following year she had her second chart hit, "Only A Rose", backed by the Sy Oliver Orchestra; the record reached no.25 on the Billboard pop chart. She also toured with R&B stars Illinois Jacquet and Willie Mabon, and had residencies in Chicago and Detroit, although she claimed in 1953 to prefer singing opera to the blues. Early in 1954 she appeared with Dizzy Gillespie, Dusty Fletcher and George Kirby in Philadelphia, and toured with vocal group the Dew Droppers. She left Coral, and Derby issued some unreleased tracks by her on their subsidiary Central label, but she did not record again until later in the year when she joined the Jubilee label, who marketed her as a pop rather than R&B performer. However, her recordings were unsuccessful and she recorded for her manager Phil Rose's Glory label, backed by vocal group the Four Fellows, featuring Larry Banks.

Although changing musical tastes meant that she was increasingly relegated to occasional performances, she recorded "What A Night For Love" for Atco in 1957, and "Zip" for Capitol in early 1960, before retiring from the music business due to diabetes. She attempted a comeback in 1964 with "You're the Greatest", a tribute to boxer Cassius Clay (later Muhammad Ali) on the Almont label and "As Long As You're Mine" on the Pulse label in 1965. In 1969 she released another single, "The Masquerade Is Over", on the Conclave label.

MacLaurin's later life seems to be unreported. According to music historian Marv Goldberg, McLaurin moved to Jamaica, Queens during her youth; public records show that she still lived there as late as 2001, but no subsequent documentation appears to exist. A compilation of some of her recordings, The Masquerade Is Over, was released as an LP in 1989 and on CD in 2013.
