= Jaibi =

American musician

- Born: Joan Carol Pulliam; February 6, 1943
- Died: September 4, 1984 (aged 41); New York City, US
- Other names: Joan Bates; Joan Banks; Joan Pulliam Myer
- Spouses: Anthony Bates Sr.; Larry Banks (m. 1965)
- Children: Three, with Bates, Sr. Corey Banks, with Larry Banks
- Musical career
- Genres: R&B, soul
- Occupations: Singer, songwriter, computer programmer
- Instrument: Vocals
- Years active: 1964–1968
- Label: Kapp Records
- Formerly of: The Pleasures; Larry Banks; Lawrence & Jaibi

Jaibi was the stage name of the American soul singer Joan Banks (February 6, 1943 – September 4, 1984).

== Life and career ==
Born Joan Carol Pulliam, and later known as Joan Bates after her marriage to her first husband Anthony Bates Sr., she first recorded with a group, the Pleasures, in 1964–65. However, she is best known for her solo records, "You Got Me" / "What Good Am I" and "It Was Like A Nightmare". These were issued on Kapp Records in 1967, co-written and produced by her second husband Larry Banks, previously the husband of singer Bessie Banks. Joan and Larry married in 1965; they also wrote songs together. Her records were not successful in terms of sales and, after a few more recordings up to 1968, some with her husband as Lawrence & Jaibi, her musical career ended.

She and Larry Banks later moved to Hollis, Queens and had one son, Corey L. Banks, who went on to become a rapper during the Golden Age of Hip-Hop. After she and Larry Banks divorced, Joan Banks completed her schooling, acquiring a master's degree in computer programming. Joan continued her life as an accomplished and successful computer programmer analyst for companies such as Polygram Records, IBM and finally reaching a high-level position at the Transamerica Corporation. She died of leukemia, on September 4, 1984; official records give her name at that time as Joan Pulliam Myer.

== Legacy ==
Since the 1990s, her recordings have been included on several compilations, including two volumes of Dave Godin's Deep Soul Treasures: Taken from the Vaults, and Larry Banks' Soul Family Album, released by Ace Records in 2007.

Her recordings are now remembered largely due to the efforts of soul music pioneer Dave Godin, who regarded them as masterpieces, of "almost indescribable beauty and poignancy", the ultimate expression of Deep Soul music. He wrote:

"No matter if you have only ever made one record, or written one book, or made one film, if that work is a great work of art then your name deserves to be remembered and your memory thanked equally as if you had produced dozens. For, in the creation of a masterpiece, even if it only touches the lives of a few, you have enriched life itself beyond measure, and in this respect, those who benefit in this way have been given a precious jewel of experience to add to all those other magic moments we collect as we journey through life."

This high opinion of her recordings was endorsed by James McKean of Stylus Magazine, who wrote:

"Were it not for a slightly clumsy fade-out I would try to make a case for this ["You Got Me"] being, quite simply, the perfect record. Although well under three minutes, it is by no means a pop song—it didn't jump out and grab me, and it might not grab you. But give it your full attention and you’ll come to cherish how the voice soars, becoming both the loved and the love, capturing perfectly the point between strength and vulnerability, pulling the two together ‘til they meet as one. The stately pace, the way the horns swell slowly and with such grace behind the melody, the way the bass starts boiling over when she sings "I try to fight this burning desire", the swirling keyboard licks, fuck, even the drums are bursting with emotion. This is the shit. This is AWESOME. I love this song!"
