= Ruby Johnson =

American soul singer

- Cover of Ruby Johnson compilation album

Background information
- Born: Ruby Johnson; April 19, 1936; Elizabeth City, North Carolina, United States
- Died: July 4, 1999 (aged 63) Lanham, Maryland, United States
- Genres: R&B, soul
- Occupation: Singer
- Years active: c.1958–1974
- Labels: V-Tone, NEBS, Volt

Ruby Johnson (April 19, 1936 – July 4, 1999) was an American soul singer, best known for her recordings on the Volt label in the late 1960s.

== Life and career ==
She was born in Elizabeth City, North Carolina, and was raised in the Jewish faith. She sang, with her eight brothers and sisters, in the Temple Beth-El choir. After completing high school, she moved to Virginia Beach where she worked as a waitress and began singing rhythm and blues with local bands, before spending two years with Samuel Latham and the Rhythm Makers. She then moved to Washington, D.C. in the late 1950s, and joined Ambrose and the Showstoppers, the house band at the Spa nightclub. Local entrepreneur Never Duncan Jnr. became her manager, and placed her with record producer Dicky Williams. Her first single, "Calling All Boys", was issued in 1960 on the V-Tone label, before Duncan established his own recording company, NEBS. She released a succession of singles on NEBS, including "Here I Go Again", "Worried Mind", and "Nobody Cares", some of which became local hits.

When her local supporter, disc jockey Al Bell, began working for Stax Records in Memphis in 1965, he won her a contract with the label. There, she recorded a handful of classic soul records with the writing and production team of Isaac Hayes and David Porter, and backing musicians including Steve Cropper, "Duck" Dunn and Al Jackson. These were issued on the Stax subsidiary label, Volt. They included "I'll Run Your Hurt Away", which reached No. 31 on the Billboard R&B chart in 1966, and "If I Ever Needed Love", both tracks which became staples of subsequent soul compilations, such as those by Dave Godin.

Despite the quality of her records, they met with little success, and after a few more years singing in clubs, she gave up her singing career in 1974. She worked in government posts, and eventually became the director of Foster Grandparents, a federal programme helping handicapped children relate to older generations. She also returned to worship and sing at the Temple Beth-El near her home in Lanham, Maryland. A compilation CD, including many previously unissued tracks, was issued in 1993.

She died in 1999, aged 63.

== Discography ==
=== Singles ===
- 1961 "Callin' All Boys" / "Pleadin' Heart" – V-TONE 222
- 1963 "I Received Your Message" / "Stop Wasting Your Tears" – Pledge 108
- 1964 "Worried Mind" / "I'm Hooked" – NEBS 502
- 1964 "What Goes Up Must Come Down" / "I Want A Real Man" – NEBS 503
- 1965 "Let Me Apologise" / "Don't Start Nothing" – NEBS 101
- 1965 "Here I Go Again" / "Jerk Shout" – NEBS 501
- 1966 "I'll Run Your Hurt Away" / "Weak Spot" – Volt 133
- 1966 "Come To Me My Darling" / "When My Love Comes Down" – Volt 140
- 1967 "Reach Out and Touch Me" / "Come Back To Me" – NEBS 508
- 1967 "If I Ever Needed Love (I Sure Do Need It Now)" / "Keep On Keeping On" – Volt 147
- 1968 "I've Been Hurt (So Many Times)" / "Through Dealing" – NEBS 509
- 1968 "Why You Want To Leave Me" / "I Can't Do It" – NEBS 511
- 1969 "Nobody Care" / "Why Do You Want To Leave Me" – NEBS 600

=== Albums ===
I'll Run Your Hurt Away, Stax, 1993
