= Holly Days =

Studio album by Denny Laine
- Released: May 13, 1977
- Recorded: August 1976
- Studio: Rude Studio, Campbeltown
- Genre: Rock; lo-fi
- Length: 29:49
- Label: EMI; Magic
- Producer: Paul McCartney

Denny Laine chronology
Ahh...Laine! (1973)	Holly Days (1977)	Japanese Tears (1980)

Singles from Holly Days
- 1. "It's So Easy"/"Listen to Me" / "I'm Looking for Someone to Love" Released: 1977; 2. "Moondreams" / "Heartbeat" Released: 1977

Professional ratings
Review scores
Source	Rating
AllMusic	4/5 stars

Holly Days is the second album by singer and guitarist Denny Laine, released in 1977. It was recorded by him with fellow Wings members Paul and Linda McCartney. The album is a tribute to singer-songwriter Buddy Holly and comprises eleven cover versions of songs originally recorded (and in some cases written or co-written) by Holly, most of them lesser-known.

== Background ==
Paul McCartney's MPL Communications had recently bought the publishing rights to Holly's catalogue, and – Laine told the press at the time – it was McCartney's father-in-law, John Eastman, who suggested that Laine record an album of tracks from this acquisition. Paul McCartney laid down the basic tracks, including some overdubs, on his four-track recorder. Laine and Linda McCartney added some instrumental parts and all three joined in on the vocals; Laine sang lead and the McCartneys harmonised, making Holly Days an unofficial Wings album of sorts. This was also the first time the core trio of Laine and the McCartneys had played by themselves on a studio album since Band on the Run, although that album included other players on overdubs. (Note: Wings were slated to tour in 1977, but due to two members having left and Linda being pregnant with her and Paul's third child, the tour with the trio lineup did not happen.) Due to the rudimentary recording methods used to capture the "Buddy Holly style", only tracks 2 and 3 are actually in stereo.

== Track listing ==
Side one
No.	Title	Writer(s)	Length
1.	"Heartbeat"	Bob Montgomery, Norman Petty	2:37
2.	"Moondreams"	Petty	2:41
3.	"Rave On"	Sonny West, Bill Tilghman, Petty	1:47
4.	"I'm Gonna Love You Too"	Joe Mauldin, Niki Sullivan, Petty	2:15
5.	"Fool's Paradise"	Sonny Le Claire, Horace Linsley, Petty	2:46
6.	"Lonesome Tears"	Buddy Holly	3:05

Side two
No.	Title	Writer(s)	Length
7.	"It's So Easy / Listen To Me" (Medley)	Holly, Petty/Charles Hardin, Petty	3:47
8.	"Look At Me"	Petty, Holly, Jerry Allison	3:10
9.	"Take Your Time"	Holly, Petty	3:38
10.	"I'm Looking For Someone To Love" (Instrumental)	Holly, Petty	3:57

== Personnel ==
According to AllMusic:

- Denny Laine – lead vocals, guitars, keyboards
- Paul McCartney – backing vocals, guitars, bass guitar, keyboards, drums, drum machine
- Linda McCartney – backing vocals, keyboards

Technical

- Paul McCartney – producer, engineer
- Linda McCartney – photography
