= Jimmy Tig =

- Born: James Tigner Jr. July 20, 1938; Atlanta, Georgia, US
- Died: September 21, 2007 (aged 69) Atlanta, Georgia
- Genres: R&B, soul
- Occupations: Musician, bandleader, songwriter
- Instruments: Vocals, drums
- Years active: Mid-1950s–1970s
- Formerly of: The Rounders

James Tigner, Jr. (July 20, 1938 – September 21, 2007), known as Jimmy Tig, was an American R&B singer, drummer, bandleader and songwriter who recorded and performed between the 1950s and 1970s.

== Biography ==
He was born in Atlanta, Georgia, and began playing drums as a child. He worked as a professional musician from his early teens, and over the years performed with such musicians as James Brown, Wilson Pickett, Otis Redding, the Tams, the Drifters and Gladys Knight and the Pips. He also led his own band, Jimmy Tig & The Rounders, and recorded his song "Small Town Girl" for the small Jora label; it was later reissued by the larger Spar label in Nashville, Tennessee in about 1965. The record is thought to feature the band Johnny Jones and the King Casuals, including Jones (guitar), Billy Cox (bass), Ted Jarrett (piano) and Freeman Brown (drums).

Although the record was unsuccessful, Tig and his band continued to perform and tour in the southern states. Other members of the Rounders included Mighty Sam McClain and Ben Moore (who later sang as "Bobby Purify").

In 1968, Tig and his wife recorded a version of Oscar Toney, Jr.'s song "A Love That Never Grows Cold" in Muscle Shoals for Bell Records with producer Papa Don Schroeder, the same label and producer as had recorded Toney's original. The record, credited to Jimmy and Louise Tig and Company, was again not a commercial success, despite Louise Tig's "emotionally compelling" lead vocal, but was later included on the compilation album Bell's Cellar of Soul – Two, and was released in the UK by Dave Godin as a single on his Deep Soul label and again, in the 1990s, on his Deep Soul Treasures: Vol.2.

Tig's final record release was "Everybody's Laffing", credited to Jimmy Tig & The Tig Family and issued on the Tuska label in Atlanta in about 1970.

In 1971, his song "Peace Brother Peace" was recorded by his 7-year-old son Eric, and released on Hi Records as the B-side of Eric's version of Roy Head's song "Treat Her Right"; Eric appeared on the syndicated TV program The Mike Douglas Show. Jimmy Tigner also wrote both sides of Eric Tig's 1978 single, "Mr. D.J."/"Heaven".

Tigner lived in California during the 1970s, and performed in clubs where he met Redd Foxx, gaining work with the Sanford and Son production company as a result. He returned to live in Atlanta in the 1980s, and in 1982, was seriously injured when, riding a motorcycle, he was hit by an automobile on his first day at work for a company at Hartsfield International Airport outside Atlanta. As a result, he was left with some brain damage and physical disabilities which reduced his ability to work. He took legal action against the company which had failed to place adequate road signs on the highway, winning financial compensation of $2 million as a result; however, he later lost most of the settlement as a result of actions by his broker and had to take further legal action to recoup it.

He became a minister at a Baptist church in Atlanta. During the 1980s, he returned to work in entertainment, founding Dynasty Records and hosting a weekly cable television show where he campaigned against substance abuse after one of his sons was killed in a drug-related shooting. In 1987 he promoted a "Rapper's Rap Off" in Atlanta, to reward the rapper with the best anti-drugs message. He later worked as a driver and anger management trainer under Robert McMichael, sheriff of Fulton County, and managed an electronic monitoring program. He also performed in later years as a member of his son Eric's band, Lil' Eric Tig and the Tig Family.

He died in Atlanta in 2007 at the age of 69.
