= Phil Kay =

Scottish comedian (born 1969)

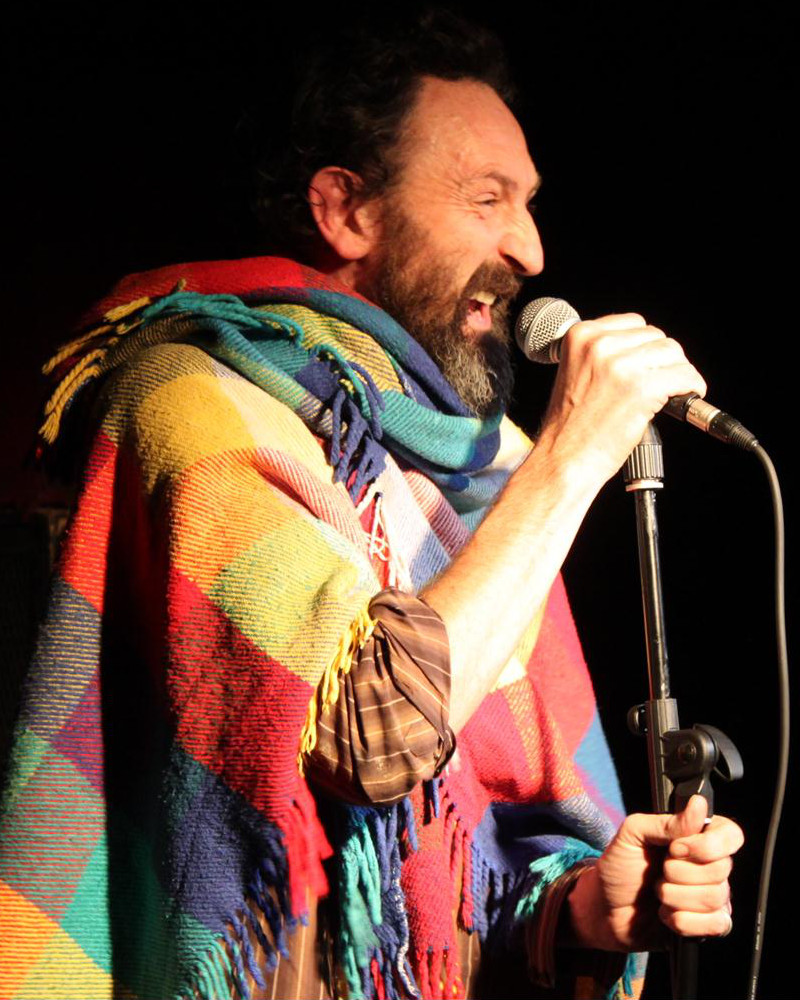
Kay in 2013

Phil Kay (born 1969) is a Scottish stand-up comedian.

== Biography ==
=== Education ===
Kay was educated at Craigclowan Preparatory School in Perth, Scotland, and at nearby Glenalmond College.

=== Early career ===
Kay became known to the public when he won the newcomer's competition, 'So You Think You're Funny', at the Edinburgh Festival Fringe in 1989. He then went on to be nominated for the prestigious Perrier Award in 1993. He won the award for Best Stand-Up at the British Comedy Awards in 1994.

Kay continued to work worldwide as a live stand-up, most notably on regular and very successful tours of the Adelaide Festival and Melbourne International Comedy Festival in Australia.

=== Later career ===
Phil has also gone on to other adventures such as selling books in Halifax, Nova Scotia.

Since 2011, he has performed sold-out runs at Edinburgh Fringe Festival in various venues on Bob Slayer's Heroes of Fringe. The Hive (2011, 2012), Bob's Bookshop (2013, 2014), The BlundaBus (Since 2015), and The Magical SpiegelYurt (since 2017).

He is a regular at summer festivals including Kelburn Garden Party at Kelburn Castle, Nozstock: The Hidden Valley, Vogrie Pogrie, Shambala Festival, Machynlleth Comedy Festival, Brighton Fringe and Glastonbury festival. Most of Kay's appearances have since been at provincial arts venues.

In 2022, he published a series of books with Go Faster Stripe.

== Television work ==
Kay hosted his own stand-up comedy series on Channel 4 in the UK called Phil Kay Feels..., recorded in front of a live audience in 1997. His other works on television have included Next Stop, Phil Kay (also on Channel 4), Edinburgh Nights (BBC1) and Festival of Fun (Channel 5). In conjunction with filmmaker Archie Lauchlan, he also released That Phil Kay Video onto the retail market in 2000. This unique collection of Kay's live standup gigs was re-released in 2014 via Video On Demand).

Off camera, Kay was involved with writing credits including Jonathan Ross's Saturday Show, Channel 4's Viva Cabaret, The Smell of Reeves and Mortimer, Sean's Show, Harry Hill's Pilot Show.

As a panellist, Kay appeared on the BBC television show QI. and on Nevermind the Buzzcocks. 19 November 2009, he appeared as the stand-up act on the BBC Three television show Russell Howard's Good News.
