= Clint Warwick =

English rock musician (1940–2004)

- Clint Warwick in 1965

Background information
- Born: Albert Eccles; 25 June 1940; Aston, Birmingham, England
- Died: 15 May 2004 (aged 63) Birmingham, England
- Genre: Rock
- Occupation: Musician
- Instruments: Bass; vocals
- Years active: 1964–1966, 2002–2004
- Label: Decca

Clint Warwick (born Albert Eccles; 25 June 1940 – 15 May 2004) was an English rock musician and the original bassist for the rock band the Moody Blues.

== Life and career ==
Warwick was born in Aston, Birmingham, England.

He was drawn to music during the skiffle boom of the late 1950s, joining Danny King and the Dukes and playing in Birmingham pubs and other venues. Ray Thomas and Mike Pinder, who had played together in Hamburg with the Krew Kats, decided to form a group with the addition of Denny Laine, who had fronted the Diplomats, Graeme Edge, who had been a member of Gerry Levene and the Avengers, and Eccles—who changed his name to Clint Warwick by putting together the names of his favourite singer, Dionne Warwick, and his favourite actor, Clint Walker.

The Moody Blues released one album with Warwick on bass, Go Now - The Moody Blues #1 (USA release on London Records), whereas The Magnificent Moodies was released on Decca in the UK, with sleeve notes by Donovan and a different track listing. The album yielded the hit single "Go Now", which reached No. 1 in the UK in January 1965, and the Top Ten in the U.S. Warwick took one co-lead vocal on that album with Laine, on the track "I've Got A Dream" (which featured Ray Thomas on flute). The closing track "'Bye Bye Bird" was issued as an overseas single and became a hit in France.

Warwick was also on the EP The Moody Blues issued on Decca in 1964, and appeared on all their Decca singles, beginning with their debut, "Steal Your Heart Away" (1964), then "Go Now", "I Don't Want to Go On Without You", "Everyday", "From The Bottom Of My Heart (I Love You)" (all 1965), plus "Boulevard De La Madeline" (1966) up to "Life's Not Life" in 1966.

Warwick's and Laine's era of the Moody Blues was featured on various compilation albums on both vinyl and CD, such as The Moody Blues Collection. A later CD issue of The Magnificent Moodies in 2006 included the rare track "People Gotta Give" (mistitled as "People Gotta Go") - a Pinder-Laine composition from the Boulevard De La Madeline French EP release.

Film footage survives of the original line-up of The Moody Blues performing "Go Now" on BBC2's The Beat Room (later included in the BBC series Sounds of The Sixties) plus the first single's B-side "Lose Your Money (But Don't Lose Your Mind)" on Ready Steady Go! in August 1964 with Warwick and Laine performing, and has been re-screened in recent years.

Feeling stressed by touring, Warwick left the band and his music career in 1966 to become a carpenter and spend time with his family. He released his first solo recording in 2002, a CD single entitled "My Life, the Waltz", and was working on another solo recording at the time of his death from hepatitis in 2004.
