= Sonny Wharton =

Sonny Wharton is a British house and techno DJ and Producer. In addition to his artist career, Wharton now manages a range of electronic artists, most prominently BBC Radio 1's Charlie Tee, alongside running his own record label, Strength In Numbers.

== Biography ==
=== Early life ===
Sonny Wharton was born in Wales, where he was encouraged to explore music by his father Alex Wharton. Alex Wharton produced the Moody Blues' first record "Go Now", scoring a No. 1 UK single and a No. 10 US hit in early 1965.

Wharton's early dance music influences have been cited as Carl Cox, Fatboy Slim and X-Press 2 alongside live acts such as the Prodigy and the Chemical Brothers.

=== Music career ===
Wharton's debut release as a producer came in 2004 with the release of Hotsteppa. Following support from the likes of Fatboy Slim, Pete Tong and Carl Cox, Wharton has worked on remixes for other artists of varying genres, including Ed Sheeran, Fatboy Slim, Morcheeba, The Temper Trap, Aloe Blacc, Christine & The Queens, Utah Saints and X-Press 2.

Wharton has released singles most prominently on Brighton based Skint Records. His single "Raindance" was championed by Carl Cox and dubbed "Radio 1 Ibiza Track of the Summer" and "Radio 1 Track Of The Week" after winning the public vote on BBC Radio 1's Review Show with Edith Bowman. Popular online blog In the Mix also cited Wharton's "Raindance" as number 1 in their article "Ten Massive Tunes That Ruled Ibiza". Wharton has featured on several guest mixes for BBC Radio 1, following the support of Annie Nightingale. His music has featured on Channel 5's The Gadget Show television programme, E4's Misfits and MTV.

As a DJ, Wharton won a DJ Mag mix-tape competition for Renaissance which afforded him a chance to perform in the Ibiza nightclub Amnesia. He was subsequently given a weekly residency at Manumission held at Privilege Ibiza (the world's largest nightclub), where he belonged to the island's large British dance contingent. This initial exposure in the Ibiza scene has led Wharton to play sell out shows at other club venues such as Pacha Sao Paolo, Space Ibiza and Ministry of Sound in London where he supported Armand van Helden for the club's 22nd birthday. Wharton has held international DJ residencies in Stockholm, Barcelona and most notably at Club Octagon in Seoul, ranked at #5 in DJ Mag's Top 100 Clubs poll and toured extensively with appearances worldwide from New York and LA to Tokyo, Moscow, Sydney and Shenzhen. Fatboy Slim endorsed Wharton as his "Favourite Producer Of The Year" and included him as a key support act on his sold out 'Eat Sleep Rave Repeat' UK Tour alongside Riva Starr. A regular on the festival circuit, Wharton has performed at events such as Glastonbury, V Festival, Global Gathering and The Isle of Wight Festival. Wharton's largest event to date was The Berlin Love Parade where he played to a collective crowd of over 1 million people.

Wharton is the UK ambassador for music technology brands Ortofon and Ecler, appearing at international trade shows where he displays the range of products for the companies and features in the companies advertising campaigns in the press and on screen. Wharton is also regularly associated with primary ticket outlet and events guide Skiddle, with appearances at events associated with their business (including corporate events organised by and for the business).

Sonny has curated and mixed several dance music compilations including Back To The Boutique for Skint Records, Exploring UK on Baroque and Stress Records recent Club Culture album which features music from Prospa, Tommy Farrow and Alex Metric.

Alongside Mark Ronson and Eddie Temple Morris, Wharton is an ambassador for the British Tinnitus Association campaign "Plug 'Em" as well as a leading ambassador for the charity group Campaign Against Living Miserably (CALM), who deal with the issues of depression and suicide among young men in the UK.

=== Management career ===
In 2017, Wharton joined London based Your Army Ltd as part of their management department looking after such artists as OC & Verde, Jansons, and Sharam (Deep Dish). Following this Wharton went on to manage Chicago based Gene Farris and Jess Bays before signing and working with Charlie Tee who is now BBC Radio 1's "first female presenter of Radio 1's Drum & Bass show".

== Record labels ==
=== Whartone Records ===
Whartone records was founded in 2009. As well as being the main hub for Wharton's solo productions, the label has released music from Avicii, K-Klass, X-Press 2 and Will Clarke with support from Carl Cox, Pete Tong, Sander Kleinenberg, Sebastian Ingrosso, Mark Knight, Roger Sanchez, and regular plays on BBC Radio 1, Kiss FM and Capital FM.

=== Strength In Numbers ===
Founded in 2022 Wharton's second label Strength In Numbers has been supported heavily across BBC Radio 1, Capital Dance and Kiss with releases from such artists as Dark Arts Club, Coco Cole, Monoed, Atkiins and TrippleJayy. The label's first release was by Dart Arts Club entitled "Still Dream About You" which celebrated four weeks in the Capital Dance playlist.
