= Denny Laine =

English rock musician (1944–2023)

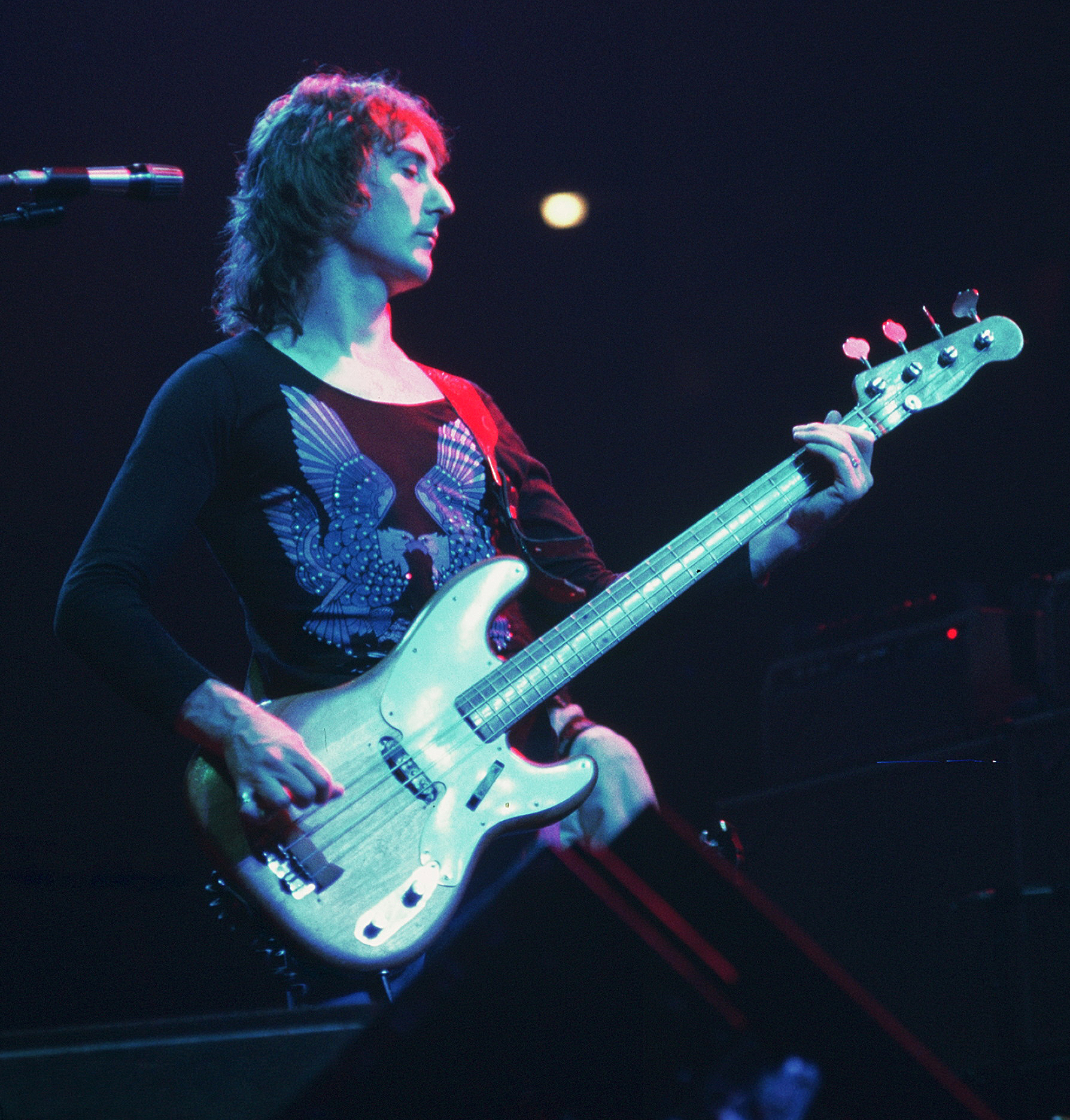
- Laine performing with Wings in 1976

Background information
- Born: Brian Frederick Hines; 29 October 1944; Tyseley, Birmingham, England (Note: Some sources claim that Laine was born near Jersey in the Channel Islands, at the time occupied by the Nazi occupation. In their 1999 Rock Stars Encyclopedia, Dafydd Rees and Luke Crampton say: "Tyseley, Birmingham, Warks, during an air raid, though legend will also indicate birth in a boat off the coast of Jersey, Channel Islands".)
- Died: 5 December 2023 (aged 79) Naples, Florida, US
- Genres: Rock; pop; R&B
- Occupations: Musician; songwriter
- Instruments: Vocals; guitar; bass guitar; keyboards; harmonica
- Years active: 1957–2023
- Labels: Deram; Decca; Wizard; Reprise; EMI; Capitol; Arista; Takoma; Scratch; President; Griffin; Global
- Formerly of: Wings; The Moody Blues; Electric String Band; Ginger Baker's Air Force; Denny Laine and the Diplomats; Denny Laine band

Brian Frederick Hines (29 October 1944 – 5 December 2023), known professionally as Denny Laine, was an English musician who co-founded two major rock bands: the Moody Blues and Paul McCartney and Wings. Laine played guitar in the Moody Blues from 1964 to 1966 and sang their hit cover version of "Go Now". Laine befriended Paul McCartney, who later asked him to join his band Wings.

Laine was a constant member of Wings for their entire run from 1971 to 1981, playing guitar, bass and keyboards, and singing backing and lead vocals. He wrote songs with McCartney, including the 1977 hit "Mull of Kintyre". Laine worked with a variety of other artists, such as Ginger Baker, Trevor Burton and Bev Bevan as a part of groups over a six-decade career. In later years he participated in a number of Wings/McCartney/Beatles tribute performances and recordings. He also had an extensive solo career consisting of ten studio albums of original music and a Wings covers album and also wrote a musical. Laine performed as a solo artist and touring musician until his death. In 2018, Laine was inducted into the Rock and Roll Hall of Fame as a member of the Moody Blues.

== Early years ==
Brian Frederick Hines was born on 29 October 1944 to Herbert Edward Arthur Hines and Eva Lillian Hines (née Bassett) in Holcombe Road, Tyseley, Birmingham, England, and he attended Yardley Grammar School. He took up the guitar as a boy, inspired by gypsy jazz musician Django Reinhardt. He gave his first solo performance as a musician at age 12 and began his career as a professional musician, fronting Denny Laine and the Diplomats, which also included Bev Bevan, future drummer with the Move and Electric Light Orchestra. Laine changed his name because he felt "Brian Frederick Hines and the Diplomats... wouldn't work", instead taking the surname of his sister's idol, the singer Frankie Laine. The first name Denny was a childhood nickname, stemming from the fact that at the time "everyone had a backyard, and a den to hang out. I think I got that nickname there."

== Career ==
=== The Moody Blues ===
At the beginning of 1964, Laine left the Diplomats. In May of that year he received a call from Ray Thomas and Mike Pinder who were forming a new band, the M&B 5, who within a few months changed their name to the Moody Blues. He sang lead vocal on the group's first big hit, a cover of Bessie Banks's hit "Go Now"; other early highlights included another UK hit, "I Don't Want to Go on Without You", and the two minor UK chart hits "From the Bottom of My Heart (I Love You)" and "Everyday", both written by Laine and Pinder. Laine also sang on "Can't Nobody Love You" and "Bye Bye Bird", the latter of which was a hit in France. A self-titled EP and the album The Magnificent Moodies followed, on Decca Records. Laine and Pinder wrote most of the band's B-sides during the period 1965–66, such as "You Don't (All the Time)", "And My Baby's Gone" and "This Is My House (But Nobody Calls)". However, Laine's tenure with the Moody Blues was relatively short-lived and, after a number of comparative chart failures, Laine quit in October 1966. He was replaced by Justin Hayward. The last record issued by the Moody Blues that featured Laine was the single "Life's Not Life" b/w "He Can Win", in January 1967.

A compilation album of singles and album tracks of the early Moody Blues, led by Denny Laine, was released in 2006 under the title An Introduction to The Moody Blues.

=== Electric String Band and early solo career ===
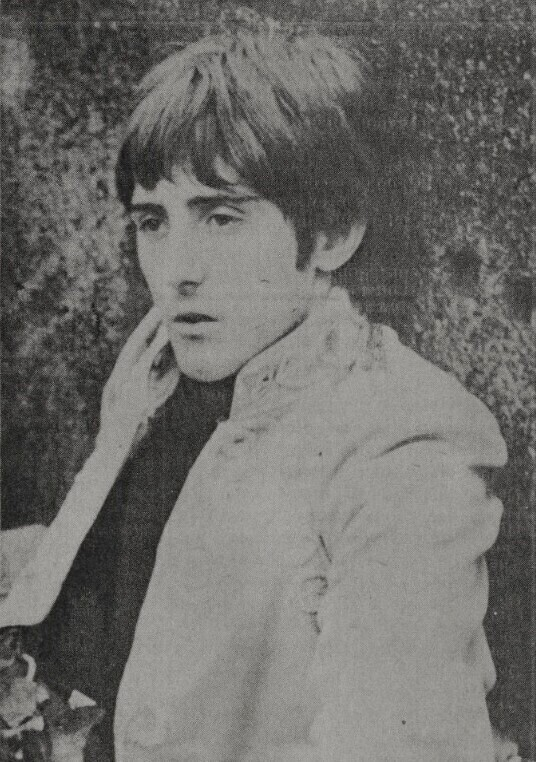
Laine in 1967

In December 1966, after leaving the Moody Blues, Laine formed the Electric String Band, featuring himself on guitar and vocals, Trevor Burton (of the Move) on guitar, Viv Prince (formerly of The Pretty Things) on drums, Binky McKenzie on bass guitar, and electrified strings. In June 1967 the Electric String Band shared a bill with the Jimi Hendrix Experience and Procol Harum at the Saville Theatre in London. However, they did not achieve national attention, and soon broke up.

At the same time, Laine recorded two singles as a solo artist, both released on the Deram label: "Say You Don't Mind" b/w "Ask the People" (April 1967) and "Too Much in Love" b/w "Catherine's Wheel" (January 1968). Both failed to chart, although "Say You Don't Mind" became a Top 20 hit in 1972, when recorded by former Zombies front-man Colin Blunstone.

=== Balls and Ginger Baker's Air Force ===
Laine and Burton then went on to join the band Balls, from February 1969 until their breakup in 1971, with both also taking time to play in Ginger Baker's Air Force in 1970. Balls issued only one single, on UK Wizard Records: "Fight for My Country" b/w "Janie, Slow Down". The top side was re-edited and reissued under Trevor Burton's name, under the UK Wizard label in the UK, and by Epic Records in the United States. Burton and Laine shared lead vocals on the B-side. The single was reissued again as B.L & G. (Burton, Laine & Gibbons) as Live in the Mountains for a small label distributed by Pye Records. Twelve tracks were recorded for a Balls album, but it has never been released.

=== Wings ===
In 1971, Laine joined forces with Paul McCartney and wife Linda McCartney to form Wings, and he remained with the group for 10 years until they disbanded in 1981, being the only three permanent members of the band. Laine provided lead and rhythm guitars, lead and backing vocals, keyboards, bass guitar and woodwind, in addition to writing or co-writing some of the group's material. Laine and the McCartneys were the nucleus of the band and were reduced to a trio twice: the most acclaimed Wings album, Band on the Run, and the majority of material released on London Town, were written and recorded by Wings as a trio. Laine was also a frequent contributor to the songwriting process and as lead vocalist. He wrote and sang several songs himself ("Time to Hide", "Again and Again and Again"), co-wrote a number of compositions on Band on the Run and London Town, and sang lead vocals on McCartney's songs in full ("The Note You Never Wrote") or in part ("I Lie Around", "Picasso's Last Words", "Spirits of Ancient Egypt"). During Wings' live concerts, Laine often performed "Go Now", his hit with the Moody Blues, as well as "Time to Hide".

During his time in Wings, Laine also released two solo albums, Ahh...Laine! (1973) and Holly Days (1977), the latter of which was also recorded by Wings' core trio of Laine and the McCartneys.

While in Wings, Laine also contributed to the album McGear, the second solo album by Mike McCartney in 1974. The album also included Mike's brother Paul (using the pseudonym McGear).

With Wings, Laine enjoyed the biggest commercial and critical successes of his career. The non-album single "Mull of Kintyre", co-written with McCartney, became a hit, reaching No. 1 in the UK Singles Chart in 1977 and being the highest-selling single in the country until 1984. "Deliver Your Children" (from the album London Town), similarly co-written with McCartney and sung by Laine, was released as a double A-side with "I've Had Enough" in the Netherlands, where it charted at No. 13.

In January 1980, after Wings leader McCartney was arrested for possession of marijuana, on arrival at an airport in Japan where they were booked to perform a sell-out tour, the band's future became uncertain. Laine released his third solo album, Japanese Tears, with the title track as the single; it included several songs recorded by Wings over the years. (Laine also formed the short-lived Denny Laine Band with Wings' final drummer Steve Holley.) Though Wings briefly reunited in late 1980, on 27 April 1981, Laine left Wings, due to McCartney's reluctance to tour in the wake of the murder of John Lennon.

=== Solo career ===
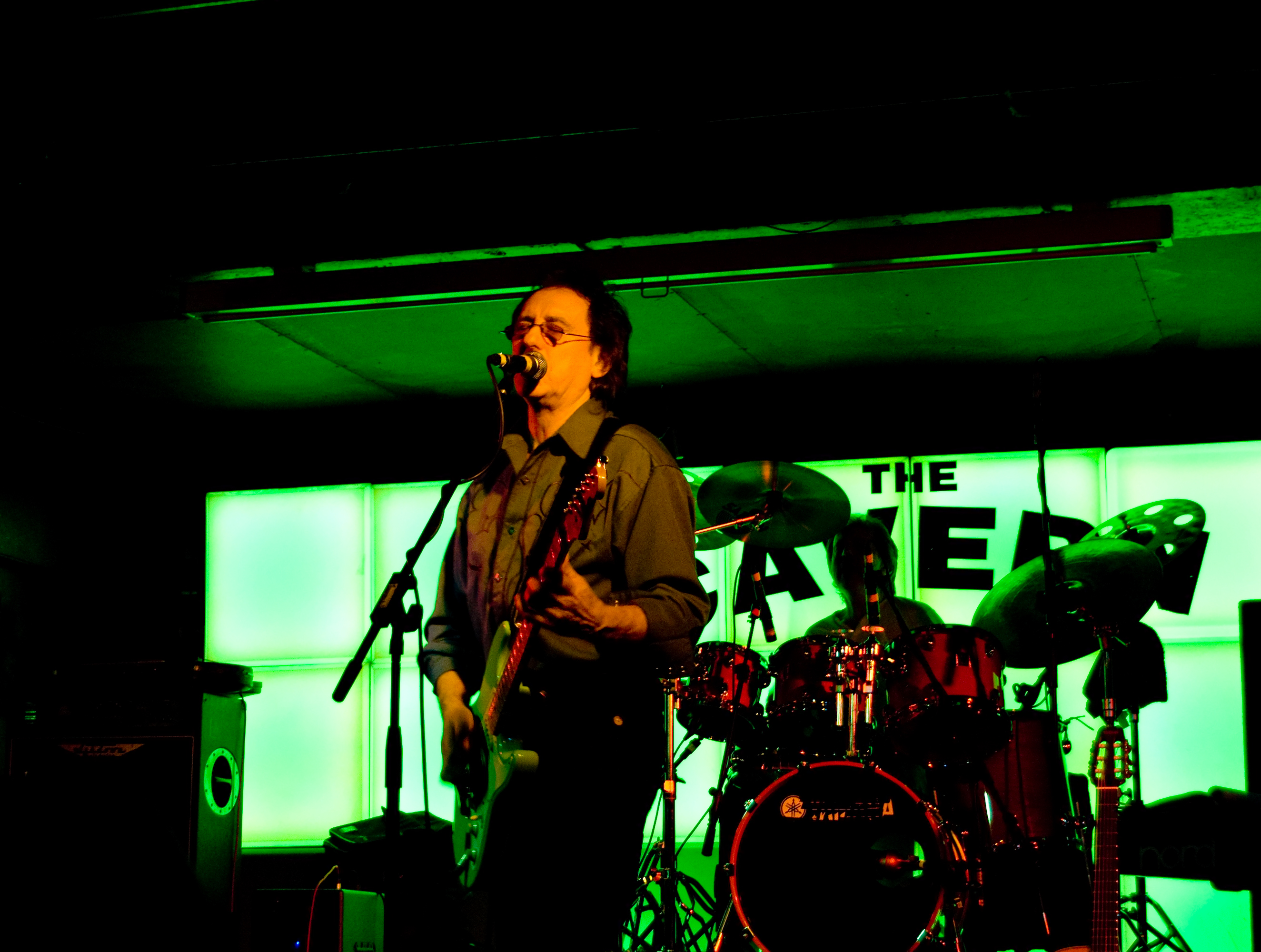
Laine performing at the Cavern Club in 2008

After leaving Wings, Laine signed with Scratch Records and released a new album, Anyone Can Fly, in 1982. He also worked on McCartney's albums Tug of War and Pipes of Peace and he co-wrote one more song with McCartney, "Rainclouds" (issued as the B-side of the No. 1 single "Ebony and Ivory").

Laine continued to release solo albums through the 1980s, such as Hometown Girls, Wings on My Feet, Lonely Road and Master Suite. In 1996, he released two albums, Reborn and Wings at the Sound of Denny Laine, the latter an album of reworkings of Wings songs.

From 1997 to 2002, he toured with the rock supergroup World Classic Rockers, a group of rock veterans led by Nick St. Nicholas of Steppenwolf. He then toured with the Denny Laine Band. Laine's final solo release was the 2008 album The Blue Musician. He also wrote a musical, Arctic Song.

In 2018 he performed with the nine-piece band Turkuaz, performing the music of Wings. In 2018 Laine was inducted into the Rock and Roll Hall of Fame as a member of the Moody Blues.

In January 2023, Laine announced tour dates in the US, including New York and Nashville, and said he was working on new material for an album.

== Personal life and death ==
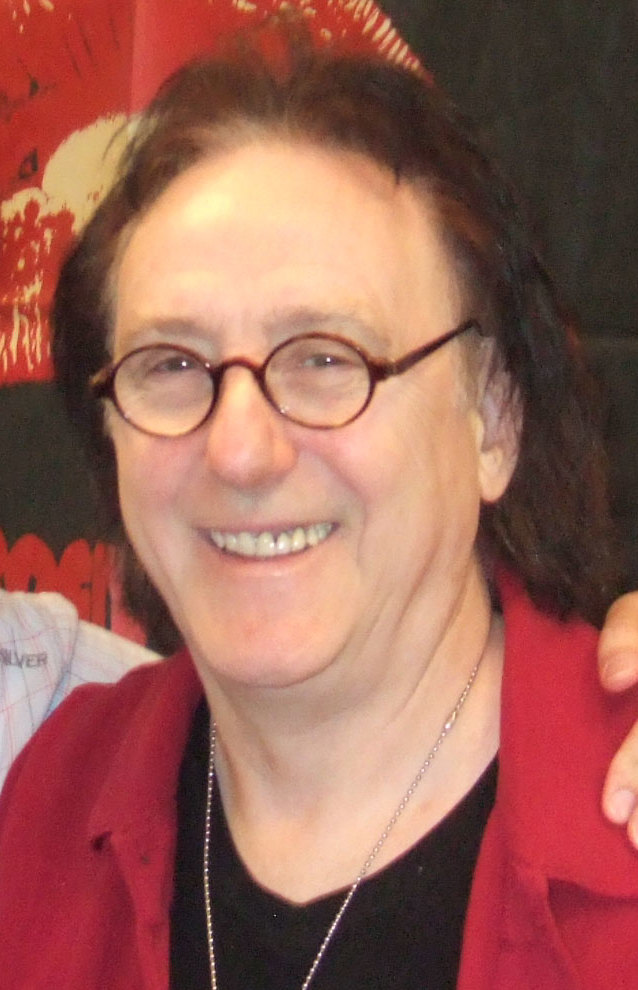
Laine in 2013

Laine was briefly married to Jo Jo Laine, with whom he had a son Laine Hines and a daughter Heidi Jo Hines. He had three other children from other relationships. Laine married Elizabeth Mele in July 2023. They resided in Florida.

Laine had a relationship with Helen Grant, the daughter of Led Zeppelin manager Peter Grant. They had a daughter named Lucianne, born in 1987.

Laine contracted COVID-19 in 2022 then had multiple surgeries for lung issues, including a collapsed lung. After his wife launched a GoFundMe page, Laine's musician friends and supporters organised a benefit concert at the Troubadour nightclub in West Hollywood, California, on 27 November 2023.

Laine died from interstitial lung disease in Naples, Florida, on 5 December 2023 at the age of 79. His wife announced his death on his official Facebook and Instagram pages.

== Discography ==
=== Solo albums ===
Year	Album	Label
1973	Ahh...Laine!	Wizard/Reprise (US)
1977	Holly Days	EMI/Capitol (US)
1980	Japanese Tears	Polydor/Scratch
1982	Anyone Can Fly	Polydor/Scratch
1985	Hometown Girls	President
1987	Wings on My Feet	President
1988	Lonely Road	President
1988	Master Suite	Magnum Force
1990	All I Want Is Freedom	JAWS
1996	Reborn	Griffin/Scratch
1996	Wings at the Sound of Denny Laine	Scratch/Purple Pyramid (US)
2008	The Blue Musician	Peacock

=== Compilation albums ===
Year	Album	Notes
1994	Blue Nights	tracks from 1980 to 1990
1994	Rock Survivor	tracks from 1980 to 1990
1998	The Masters	tracks from 1980 to 1996
2002	Blue Wings: The Ultimate Collection	Wings at the Sound of Denny Laine paired with Japanese Tears

=== Singles ===
Year	A-side	B-side	Label
1967	"Say You Don't Mind"	"Ask the People"	Deram DM 122
1968	"Too Much in Love"	"Catherine's Wheel"	Deram DM 171
1968	"Why Did You Come?"	"Ask the People"	unreleased
1980	"Japanese Tears"	"Guess I'm Only Fooling"	Arista AS 0511

=== Guest appearances ===
Year	Album	Artist	Comment
1974	McGear	Mike McGear	Wings as backing band
1980	The Reluctant Dog	Steve Holley	
1981	Somewhere in England	George Harrison	backing vocals on "All Those Years Ago"
1982	Standard Time	Laurence Juber	"Maisie" is recorded by Wings
1982	Tug of War	Paul McCartney	electric guitar, guitar synthesizer, acoustic guitar, bass guitar, synthesizers
1982	"Ebony and Ivory"	Paul McCartney	co-writer and backing vocals on "Rainclouds"
1983	Pipes of Peace	Paul McCartney	keyboards, guitars, vocals
1985	Wind in the Willows	Eddie Hardin and Zak Starkey	"The Life We Left Behind"
1996	Metal Christmas	Various Artists	"I Wish It Could Be Christmas Everyday"
1998	Wide Prairie	Linda McCartney	several songs on the album recorded by various lineups of Wings
1999	A Tribute to Garth Brooks	Various Artists	"The Thunder Rolls"

=== With the Moody Blues ===
Albums

Year	Album
1965	The Magnificent Moodies

Singles

Year	A-side	B-side	Album
1964	"Steal Your Heart Away"	"Lose Your Money"	Non-album single
1964	"Go Now"	"It's Easy, Child"	The Magnificent Moodies
1965	"I Don't Want to Go on Without You"	"Time on My Side"	Non-album single
1965	"From the Bottom of My Heart"	"And My Baby's Gone"	Non-album single
1965	"Everyday"	"You Don't (All The Time)"	Non-album single
1966	"Boulevard De La Madeleine"	"This Is My House (But Nobody Calls)"	Non-album single
1967	"Life's Not Life"	"He Can Win"	Non-album single

=== With Balls reissued as by Trevor Burton ===
Year	A-side	B-side
1970 (Balls)	"Fight for My Country"	"Janie, Slow Down"
1971 (Trevor Burton)	"Fight for My Country" (edited)	"Janie, Slow Down"
1972 (B.L.G.)	"Live in the Mountains" (same as "Fight for My Country") (edited)	"Janie, Slow Down"

=== With Ginger Baker's Air Force ===
Year	Album
1970	Ginger Baker's Air Force
1970	Ginger Baker's Air Force 2

=== With Wings ===
Year	Album
1971	Wild Life
1973	Red Rose Speedway
1973	Band on the Run
1975	Venus and Mars
1976	Wings at the Speed of Sound
1978	London Town
1979	Back to the Egg

== Bibliography ==
- McCartney, Paul (2002). Lewisohn, Mark (ed.). Wingspan. Bulfinch. ISBN 9780821227930.
