= Bye Bye Bird =

Single by Sonny Boy Williamson II
- A-side: "Help Me"
- Released: 1963
- Recorded: Chicago, January 11, 1963
- Genre: Blues
- Length: 2:30
- Label: Checker
- Songwriter(s): Sonny Boy Williamson II; Willie Dixon
- Producer(s): Leonard Chess; Phil Chess; Willie Dixon

Sonny Boy Williamson II singles chronology
"One Way Out" / "Nine Below Zero" (1962)	"Bye Bye Bird" (1963)	"Trying to Get Back on My Feet" / "Decoration Day" (1963)

"Bye Bye Bird" is a harmonica-driven blues song written by Willie Dixon and Sonny Boy Williamson II. In 1963, Checker Records issued it as the B-side of Williamson's single "Help Me", which was his last single to reach the record charts.

The song was recorded on January 11, 1963, by Williamson on vocal and harmonica, backed by Lafayette Leake or Billy Emerson on organ, Matt Murphy on guitar, Milton Rector on bass, and Al Duncan on drums.

"Bye Bye Bird" is included on several Sonny Boy Williamson compilation albums, such as More Real Folk Blues (1967) and His Best (1997). A live recording by Williamson from December 8, 1963, at the Crawdaddy Club, in Richmond, England, accompanied by the Yardbirds, is included on Sonny Boy Williamson and the Yardbirds (1966).

The song was recorded by the Moody Blues for their 1965 debut album The Magnificent Moodies.
