= Ahh...Laine! =

Studio album by Denny Laine
- Released: November 16, 1973
- Recorded: Late 1968–Early 1969
- Genre: Rock
- Length: 36:47
- Label: Wizard
- Producer: Denny Laine; Ian Horne; Tony Secunda

Denny Laine chronology
Ahh...Laine! (1973)	Holly Days (1977)

Singles from Ahh...Laine!
- 1. "Find a Way Somehow" b/w "Move Me to Another Place"" Released: 1973

Professional ratings
Review scores
Source	Rating
AllMusic	3/5 stars

Ahh...Laine! is the first solo album by Wings guitarist Denny Laine, released in 1973. While not released until November 1973, Ahh...Laine! was recorded pre-Wings, after Denny returned from Spain, post-Electric String Band.

The title comes from the Gravy Granules slogan "Aah! Bisto". A melodic folk-rock album, it was not released at the time of recording due to how busy Laine was with other projects at time. On the front cover he has a Wings T-shirt, however he did perform some of these songs before joining Paul and Linda McCartney in the band. The album was given an official release in the UK on Wizard and in the US on Reprise/Warner Bros. Records in 1973.

== Track listing ==
All songs written by Denny Laine.

Side one

1. "Big Ben" (Instrumental) – 1:30
2. "Destiny Unknown" – 2:30
3. "Baby Caroline" – 4:09
4. "Don't Try, You'll Be Refused" – 1:51
5. "Talk to the Head" – 3:34
6. "Sons of Elton Haven Brown" – 4:16

Side two

1. "Find a Way Somehow" – 2:58
2. "Havin' Heaven" – 3:15
3. "On That Early Morning" – 3:36
4. "The Blues" – 2:53
5. "Everybody" – 3:11
6. "Move Me to Another Place" – 3:16

== Personnel ==
- Denny Laine – guitars, keyboards, lead vocals
- John Moorshead – guitars
- Steve Thompson – bass guitar
- Phoebe Laob – backing vocals
- Mary McCreary – backing vocals
- Colin Allen – drums, percussion
- Pierce Wilson – front vocals

Phoebe Snow sings uncredited vocals on "Move Me to Another Place".
