= Life's Not Life =

- Dutch picture sleeve

Single by the Moody Blues
- B-side: "He Can Win"
- Released: 13 January 1967
- Recorded: 8 September 1966
- Studio: Decca, London
- Genre: Soul pop
- Length: 2:35
- Label: Decca
- Songwriters: Denny Laine; Mike Pinder
- Producer: Denny Cordell

The Moody Blues singles chronology
"Boulevard de la Madeleine" (1966)	"Life's Not Life" (1967)	"Fly Me High" (1967)

Audio
- "Life's Not Life" on YouTube

"Life's Not Life" is a song written by Denny Laine and Mike Pinder, initially recorded by their group the Moody Blues. The song, inspired by the Four Seasons, was recorded in a period where the band saw little commercial success and instabilities in their line-up, and is their only release to feature Rod Clark on bass. Despite being recorded and sung by Laine in September 1966, Decca Records chose to release the single in January 1967 after guitarist Justin Hayward and bassist John Lodge had replaced him and Clark. The single received extensive radio play, but failed to chart. Reviews of the single were positive upon initial release.

== Background and composition ==
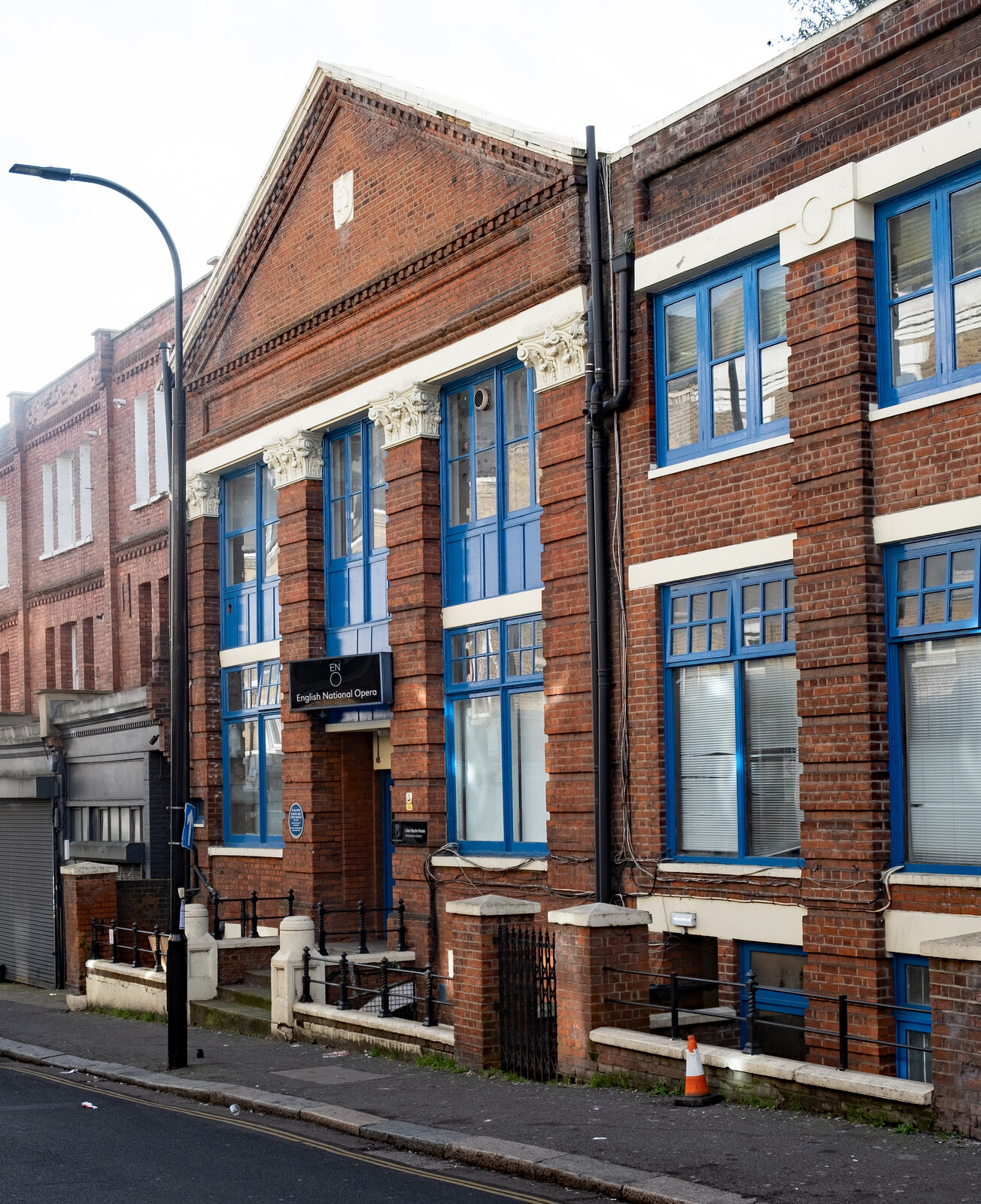
"Life's Not Life" was recorded at Decca Studios in London.

By mid-1966, British pop band the Moody Blues had hit an all-time low commercially, as none of their singles since 1965's "Everyday" had been a chart hit on the UK singles chart, reaching number 44. Dissolution of the music industry, alongside their hectic touring schedule contributed to bassist Clint Warwick departing from the group shortly after a recording session on 5 July 1966. He was replaced by Rod Clark, previously bassist of the Monotones; he made his debut performance with the Moody Blues at the Locarno Ballroom in Coventry on 14 July 1966, followed by another recording session the following day. The recordings were primarily intended to fulfill contractual obligations with Decca Records and their management company Ridgepride; none of these recordings had yet been issued in the UK, where the band hadn't released any music since October 1965.

As with most of the Moody Blues' material at the time, "Life's Not Life" was penned by guitarist / vocalist Denny Laine and keyboardist Mike Pinder during the summer of 1966, and had been incorporated into their set list and performed on television then. According to writer Geoffrey Freakes, "Life's Not Life" is a "soulful, mid-temp ballad" that primarily draws inspiration from the Four Seasons contemporary output, especially in the arrangements of the harmonies, piano and flute. The song was recorded at a session booked by producer Denny Cordell at Decca Studios in West Hampstead on 8 September 1966; this session was also intended to fulfill contractual obligations, and additionally produced a re-recording of "This Is My House (But Nobody Calls)", "He Can Win", "I Really Haven’t Got the Time" and "Red Wine".

Free from the contract, Laine announced his departure from the Moody Blues on 24 September 1966; he had been planning on leaving the group since the summer, but refrained from doing so. When Clark left the band for the Rockin' Berries later that month, guitarist Justin Hayward and bassist John Lodge were hired in their respective places; Amidst the publicity in the media, Decca chose to release "Boulevard de la Madeleine", featuring Laine and Warwick, as a single in October 1966. It failed to chart.

== Release and reception ==
As the new line-up featuring Hayward and Lodge had yet recorded any new material owing to their tours of France, Decca released "Life's Not Life" as a single on 13 January 1967, backed by "He Can Win" which Freakes describes as an homage to merseybeat that sounded like Gerry and the Pacemakers. Decca chose to release "Life's Not Life" as the second line-up of the band were trying to establish themselves, leading to some slight confusion by fans over what members performs on the song. Given the band's lack of commercial success during this time, the single failed to reach the UK singles chart; however, it did garner sufficient airplay on Pirate radio stations which caused it to reach Radio London's Fab 40 chart, peaking at 35 for a week. "Life's Not Life" was far more successful in France, where it was released on a four-track EP and promoted on television.

"Life's Not Life" received primarily positive reviews in the British press upon release. In Disc and Music Echo, journalist Penny Valentine states that she's always admired the group, comparing them to the Zombies for "sticking to a very individual style of music", though notes that it's the "odd-half notes and key changes" that's keeping chart success away. She ends her review by positively Laine's "painfully hurt voice" and states that it's typically produced by Cordell. Writing for Melody Maker, Chris Hayes considers "Life's Not Life" to have a "nice production" and a "somewhat complex arrangement", noting that it has a chance of returning the band back to commercial success. Hayes ends by noting that it's a "memorable Laine and Pinder tune". Derek Johnson of New Musical Express considers the song to have a great arrangement, noting the flute passages by Ray Thomas and predicting that it might return the Moody Blues to the charts. His reviews ends by believing "it's a sign to come" regarding their music.

Since original release, "Life's Not Life" has seldom been heard, often obscured by the fact that it was released just prior to Days of Future Passed, which would return the Moody Blues to commercial success. Freakes writes that the single was the "final gasp" of the Laine-led line-up, stating that the "unbelievably catchy chorus" contributed to its status as a "fine choice to close the band's first stage". "Life's Not Life" has seldom appeared on compilation albums by the band, which tend to focus on their later singles, but was included on An Introduction to The Moody Blues (2006) and the 2014 re-issue of their debut album The Magnificent Moodies.

== Charts ==
Weekly chart performance for "Life's Not Life"
Chart (1967)	Peak position
UK (Fab 40)	35
