= David Nathan (music writer) =

English writer and singer

David Nathan (born 15 February 1948) is an English-born biographer, journalist, authority on soul music, and singer. In the 1960s and 1970s, he was the co-founder of the Soul City record label and a contributing editor to Blues & Soul magazine. Living in the US between 1975 and 2009, he wrote several biographies of musicians as well as hundreds of articles and liner notes, and founded the website soulmusic.com. He has also recorded and performed as a jazz and blues singer, both under his own name and as his alter ego Nefer Davis.

== Life and career ==
David Nathan was born in London, and at the age of 18 set up the UK's first fan club for singer Nina Simone. In 1966, with Dave Godin and Robert Blackmore, he established Soul City, in Deptford, South London, claimed to be the first record store outside the US specialising in American rhythm and blues and soul music. The shop also started a record label in 1968, to release US R&B singles in the UK.

In 1970, he began working in London for Contempo International, which owned Blues & Soul magazine. He moved to New York City in 1975 as contributing editor for Blues & Soul, leaving the company in 1981 when the magazine's ownership changed. After a period working for Werner Erhard and Associates, he then moved to Los Angeles and worked as a freelance journalist. He wrote Lionel Richie: An Illustrated Biography (1985), as well as contributing to Billboard, USA Today and other magazines including Blues & Soul which he rejoined in the mid-1980s, and writing many CD liner notes. In the 1990s, he also worked as a producer of compilation reissues, and established a media coaching service and since the mid-1980s, he has written or updated the music bios for Aretha Franklin, Chaka Khan, Lionel Richie, Usher, Whitney Houston, Patti LaBelle, Toni Braxton, Prince, Alicia Keys and hundreds of other artists, producers, songwriters, musicians and industry executives. He wrote The Soulful Divas, published in 1999, and Break Down and Let it All Out, a biography of Nina Simone co-written with his sister Sylvia Hampton, in 2004. He founded a website dedicated to soul music, SoulMusic.com, in 2001.

For a number of years, Nathan was Secretary and then an Advisory Board member of the Rhythm & Blues Foundation. He has received an award for his journalism from the International Association of African-American Music. Nathan is a graduate of The Landmark Forum and has participated as senior coach in several of Landmark's programs in the US and the UK.

Since coming back to live in London, Nathan has established the label SoulMusic Records in association with Cherry Red and as of September 2017, SoulMusic Records has reissued over 150 CDs by popular soul, jazz/funk and Motown artists.

Nathan released his first CD as a singer, Reinvention, in 2003 on his own Nefer Music label. In 2006, he issued a digital EP, Wlld Is The Wind: A Tribute To Nina Simone and In 2007, he released his second album, Wistful Elegance, produced by award-winning music man Preston Glass. In 2010, after returning to live in the UK, he recorded briefly as Nefer Davis, a name derived from his interests in ancient Egypt, before reverting to his birth name, issuing another digital-only album, I Used To Rule The World featuring covers of songs by Coldplay, The Bee Gees, Elton John, Dionne Warwick and others. Three contemporary R&B/soul music songs co-written with UK producer Amar Naik, have been released via Expansion Records and one of Nathan's earliest compositions, "Ain't Nothing Like The Love", has garnered much attention as a 1970s soul favorite in the UK (via the original John Simmons recording), through his own version (released on a French label compilation), a vinyl release by Phillip Ballou and a cover by award-winning Canadian DJ/producer Pomo. His 2017 EP release, A Long Way From Blue features his original compositions with Indian violinist/producer/composer Aritra Bhattacharya.

Considered a soul music historian, Nathan has been featured in several documentaries including TV One's Unsung series and in interviews with BBC on radio and television as well as working on the Motown Museum expansion project in Detroit.

== Bibliography ==
- Lionel Richie: An Illustrated Biography, 1985
- The Soulful Divas, 1999
- Nina Simone: Break Down & Let It All Out, with Sylvia Hampton, 2004
