= Dave Godin =

English proponent of American soul music

- Born: David Edward Godin; 21 June 1936; Peckham, London, England
- Died: 15 October 2004 (aged 68); Rotherham, Yorkshire
- Occupations: Music journalist, promoter, arts centre manager
- Known for: Establishing term "Northern soul", promoting Motown and other soul music in Britain

David Edward Godin (21 June 1936 – 15 October 2004) was an English fan of American soul music. As a journalist and record shop owner, he made a major contribution internationally in spreading awareness and understanding of the genre, and by extension African-American culture, through his promotion of Motown and other R&B artists, and by establishing the term "Northern soul". He also worked as an arts centre manager.

== Biography ==
Born in Peckham, London, the son of a milkman, Dave Godin spent his early childhood in Peckham before bombing forced the family to move to Bexleyheath, Kent, where he won a scholarship to Dartford Grammar School. Godin began collecting American R&B records when at school, where he encouraged the seven-years younger Mick Jagger's interest in black American music. He said: "..It was at Dartford Grammar School that I met Mick Jagger and introduced him to black music, I'm ashamed to say. It's ironic that as a result of meeting me he's where he is today." Godin played a minor role in the early jam sessions out of which the Rolling Stones emerged, but resented Jagger for what he saw as the Stones' exploitation of black music.

After working at an advertising agency, and as a hospital porter in place of National Service (he was a conscientious objector), Godin founded the Tamla Motown Appreciation Society, and in time was recruited by Berry Gordy to become Motown's consultant in the UK, setting up its distribution through EMI. At a recording of Ready Steady Go! in 1964, Jagger asked Godin to introduce him to Marvin Gaye. "I told him to fuck off and introduce himself", Godin recalled.

In 1967 he founded Soul City, a record shop which in 1967 developed into a record label on which he released such then-obscure soul classics as "Go Now" by Bessie Banks, with colleague David Nathan and friend Robert Blackmore. It was in their shop that Godin coined the term 'northern soul', a description that he would popularise through his work as a music journalist. In a 2002 interview with Chris Hunt of Mojo, he explained that he had first come up with the term in 1968 as a sales reference to help staff in his shop differentiate the more modern funkier sounds from the smoother, Motown-influenced soul of a few years earlier:

"I had started to notice that northern football fans who were in London to follow their team were coming into the store to buy records, but they weren't interested in the latest developments in the black American chart. I devised the name as a shorthand sales term. It was just to say ‘if you’ve got customers from the north, don't waste time playing them records currently in the US black chart, just play them what they like – ‘Northern Soul’."

In his career he also coined the term Deep Soul and he promoted the interests of a large number of American musicians whose work had fallen out of favour in their home country.

His second career was in cinema exhibition. Having studied art, design and film course at Sheffield Polytechnic, he became a senior film officer for the British Film Institute and helped found and was the manager of the Anvil Cinema, Sheffield (1983–90), the only cinema in the UK to be funded by a local authority.

In the mid 1990s he started to compile a series of CDs of rare (and some not so rare) recordings – Dave Godin's Deep Soul Treasures – for Ace Records, which featured such artists as Loretta Williams, Eddie and Ernie, Jaibi, Ruby Johnson and Jimmy and Louise Tig. The four albums were greeted with universal critical acclaim, and Godin described the series as the proudest achievement of his life. A fifth, posthumous, volume was ultimately released in 2019, based on lists of tracks he had considered for inclusion, including material intended for the four previous volumes, for which licensing rights could not be obtained at the time.

Godin, a vegan, was an advocate of animal rights and Esperanto. He was also known for his involvement in anarchist and anti-capitalist organisations, including Freedom Newspaper and Class War. He was the only atheist in his local pro-life organisation. Towards the end of his life he developed an interest in Jainism. He died in Rotherham in 2004, aged 68.

A biography, Dave Godin: a Northern Soul by Stephen Stevlor, was published in 2020 on the anniversary of Godin's death.

As a memorial to Godin, a blue plaque was unveiled in November 2024, at the former site of the Anvil arts cinema in Sheffield.
