= Jo Jo Laine =

American singer, model, and actress (1953–2006)

Jo Jo Laine (born Joanne LaPatrie July 13, 1953 – October 29, 2006) was an American singer, model and actress, who married The Moody Blues founder Denny Laine while he was a member of Paul McCartney's group Wings.

== Biography ==
=== Recording artist ===
Laine recorded with Sting and Andy Summers of the Police on her Pye Records single "Hulk" (the B-side was "Dancing Man"; the musicians from the Police possibly appeared only on the A-side), and with Ray Fenwick of the group Fancy in Jo Jo Laine & the Firm for Mercury Records. She was friends with the members of Led Zeppelin, and rumor has it that when Jimmy Page wanted the name the Firm, there were no objections from Laine. She dated producer Jimmy Miller from 1986 to 1988, and he, in turn, produced a number of recordings for her, including a remake of Gerry Goffin and Carole King's Herman's Hermits hit "I'm into Something Good", which Laine changed to "I'm in for Something Good!"

In 1986, Laine managed the British group the Mannish Boys, and also performed in the Boston band Gear.

From 1991 to 1996, Laine was one of the mistresses (dubbed "wifelets") of Alexander Thynn, 7th Marquess of Bath; she and her children lived in a cottage on his estate.

=== Memoirs ===
Laine's memoirs appeared in the British tabloid The Sunday People, in a series of articles on April 17, April 18, and May 1, 1983.

=== Death ===
Laine died at St George's Hospital, Tooting, London, at the age of 53, after a fall at her former home of Yew Corner, in Laleham, Surrey. She is survived by her children, Laine Hines and Heidi Jo Hines (from her marriage to Denny Laine); and a son Boston O'Donohue, from a relationship with Peter O'Donohue.
