= Alex Wharton =

British musician (born 1939)

- Born: 1939 (age 86–87); Scunthorpe, Lincolnshire, England

Alex Wharton (born 1939), later also known as Alex Murray, was part of the singing duo the Most Brothers with Mickie Most, and later, co-manager and producer of the Moody Blues.

== Singing and acting career ==
The Most Brothers worked in the 2i's Coffee Bar in London's Soho. They toured the UK with early rock and rollers Marty Wilde, Colin Hicks (younger brother of Tommy Steele), the Tony Crombie Big Band, Cliff Richard, the Kalin Twins, and Wee Willie Harris. In 1957 they recorded on the Decca label with "Whistle Bait" and "Takes a Whole Lotta Loving to Keep My Baby Happy" before disbanding the act in 1958.

In 1959 Wharton adopted the name Murray and moved into an acting career with the Theatre Workshop company in Stratford, East London, under the direction of the theatre director Joan Littlewood. He appeared in the first production of Fings Ain't Wot They Used T'Be before transferring to London's West End theatre, Wyndam's, as understudy to Alfred Lynch in the title role of The Hostage. He played a small role in the Arnold Wesker one-act play Last Day In Dreamland at the Lyric Hammersmith, and interspersed acting in minor film roles (Never Let Go - 1960), television parts and commercials with solo record releases on Decca.

== Career as A&R, manager and record producer ==
He wrote songs with Tony Crombie before working in 1961 as A&R man at Decca Records, the youngest in the country, at 20, in the post. His first production, "Love is Like A Violin" sung by Ken Dodd, went to number 8 in the UK singles chart. It was followed by hits with Mark Wynter; plus Rhet Stoller's "Chariot", which reached number 26 in the UK. Wharton gave much needed work to jazz musicians, at a time when they were out of fashion and struggling to find work, by producing a pioneering stereophonic album, Sweet Wide and Blue, with Stan Tracy (piano), Victor Feldman (vibes), Lenny Bush (bass), Tony Crombie (drums) and others. He also recorded albums and singles with Mantovani, Winifred Atwell, and several other Decca labelmates before leaving Decca. "Portrait of My Love" by Matt Monro was released by Parlophone and peaked at number 3 in the UK chart. He returned to acting and travelled to South Africa to visit Mickie Most who he helped and encouraged to produce his own records, and taught to handle a mixing desk in the studios there.

Wharton went on to discover and manage the Moody Blues, and produced their single "Go Now". He promoted it with a music video, produced and directed by him, and filmed on 35mm at the Marquee Club, scoring a number one UK single and a number 10 US hit in early 1965. He produced another chart hit in 1970 with "Friends" by Arrival which peaked at number 8 in the UK singles chart. He left the music industry in 1971. In 1973, Wharton moved to Wales.

== Discography ==
- "Teen Angel" / "Paper Doll", Decca F11203, 1960
- "All On My Own" / "String Along", Decca F11225, 1960
- "When You Walked Out" / "Send For Me", Decca F11345, 1961
