= Larry Banks =

American singer

- Born: Lawrence H. Banks; October 3, 1931; New York City, United States
- Died: February 26, 1992 (aged 60)
- Resting place: Calverton National Cemetery
- Occupations: Singer, songwriter, record producer
- Spouses: Bessie White (Bessie Banks) (m. 1955) Joan Bates (Jaibi) (m. 1965)
- Children: Larry, Jr., with Mabel King; Kevin, with Bessie Banks; Corey Banks, with Jaibi
- Musical career
- Genres: R&B, soul
- Instrument: Vocals
- Years active: 1953–1980s
- Labels: Derby, Glory, Kapp, RCA
- Formerly of: The Four Fellows; Bessie Banks; Jaibi; The Exciters

Lawrence H. Banks (October 3, 1931 – February 26, 1992) was an American R&B and soul singer, songwriter, and record producer.

== Life and career ==
Banks was born in New York City and grew up in the Flatbush area of Brooklyn. His father, Arthur Banks, was a bass singer of religious and classical music, who also performed as a member of a barbershop quartet called the Dunbar Barbershop Quartet, which had once performed behind opera singer Lauritz Melchior.

In the early 1950s, Banks served as a US Marine in the Korean War, and was awarded a Bronze Star. On his return in 1953, he formed a singing group, The Schemers, with former members of another group, The Four Toppers. This group soon broke up, and in 1954 Banks formed The Four Fellows, whose members were Banks (baritone), David Jones (first tenor), Jimmy McGowan (second tenor), and Teddy Williams (bass). Larry Banks wrote and arranged much of the group's material. They began performing in clubs in New York and on local TV shows, and first recorded for the independent Derby label. They then moved to the Glory label set up by Phil Rose, formerly of Coral Records. In 1955, their second release on Glory, "Soldier Boy", a song written by David Jones, reached No. 4 on the national Billboard R&B charts. The Four Fellows performed in shows organized by Alan Freed and "Dr. Jive" (Tommy Smalls), and on the black theater circuit with acts including The Moonglows and Bo Diddley. However, the group's later records were less successful. One of their final releases with the original line-up was as backing singers for Banks' wife Bessie, who at the time performed and recorded as Toni Banks, on her 1957 single "You're Still in My Heart".

Banks then left The Four Fellows and began working with his wife, although they separated in the early 1960s and later divorced; she recorded in the early 1960s as Bessie Banks. In 1961, Banks, along with brother-in-law Tony May, set up a music publishing company, Kev-Ton. A 1962 demo recording by Bessie of a song written by Banks with friend Milton Bennett, "Go Now", was heard by songwriters and record producers Jerry Leiber and Mike Stoller, who re-recorded it and released it in early 1964 on their Tiger label, later reissuing it on the Blue Cat label, the R&B/soul imprint of Red Bird. Although the record was not a substantial hit, it was later heard by English beat group The Moody Blues, who recorded the song and had an international hit, launching the band's career.

Banks wrote and recorded under his own name in the early and mid-1960s, his first release being "Will You Wait" on the Select label. He also wrote and produced for other singers and groups, including Kenny Carter, The Cavaliers, The Geminis, The Exciters, and The Pleasures, a group led by Joan Bates, whom he later married and who recorded solo as Jaibi. He recorded with his wife as "Lawrence and Jaibi". Many of his recordings and productions were undertaken for GWP Productions, whose records were released through the RCA label. In 1979, Banks appeared with The Four Fellows at the United in Group Harmony show in New Jersey. He continued to record and produce through the 1970s and 1980s.

Banks died from liver failure in 1992, aged 60, and was buried at the Calverton National Cemetery, Long Island.

== Legacy ==
He was posthumously inducted into the United in Group Harmony Association's (UGHA) 8th Annual Hall of Fame as a member of the Four Fellows in 1998.

Banks' recordings and productions, particularly with Bessie Banks and Jaibi, were among the favorites of English music historian and archivist Dave Godin, the inventor of the term "Northern soul" and producer of a number of critically acclaimed "deep soul" compilation albums. In 2007, a compilation of Banks' recordings as performer and producer, Larry Banks' Soul Family Album, was released by Ace Records.
