= Bessie Banks =

American soul singer (born 1938)

- Also known as: Toni Banks
- Born: Bessie White; February 8, 1938 (age 88); New Bern, North Carolina, United States
- Genres: R&B, soul
- Occupation: Singer
- Years active: 1957–1974
- Labels: Blue Cat, Spokane, Verve, Volt

Bessie Banks (born February 8, 1938) is an American rhythm and blues and soul singer, best known for her original 1964 recording of "Go Now", successfully covered in the same year by UK band the Moody Blues.

== Life and career ==
She was born Bessie White in New Bern, North Carolina, and later raised in Brooklyn, New York City. In the mid-1950s, she began singing with a quartet called Three Guys and a Doll. While a member of the group, she met singer Larry Banks; they married on stage at the Royal Theatre in Baltimore around 1955. She performed and recorded as Toni Banks during the mid-1950s, including the 1957 single "You're Still in My Heart", on which she was backed by the Four Fellows. In 1959, she and Larry recorded as members of the Companions, releasing a single titled "Why Oh Why Baby" on the Federal label.

Taking back the name Bessie Banks, she recorded as a solo singer in the first half of the 1960s, starting with "Do It Now" in 1963 on the Spokane Records label. The single reached No. 40 on the Billboard R&B chart in March 1964. Although she and Larry Banks separated and later divorced, they continued to work together. In late 1963, Larry and Bessie decided to make a new push to establish her with a song that Larry had written specifically for the purpose of breaking her nationally: "Go Now". Jerry Leiber and Mike Stoller produced the recording, which first appeared on their Tiger Records label (catalog number TI-102). It was slated for issue on the Blue Cat label (as BC-106), the R&B/soul imprint of Red Bird. The song was arranged by Gary Sherman, with Cissy Houston and Dee Dee Warwick as of the backing singers.

Bessie Banks later commented:

"'I remember 1963 Kennedy was assassinated; it was announced over the radio. At the time, I was rehearsing in the office of Leiber and Stoller. We called it a day. Everyone was in tears. "Come back next week and we will be ready to record 'Go Now'"; and we did so. I was happy and excited that maybe this time I’ll make it. 'Go Now' was released and right away it was chosen Pick Hit of the Week on W.I.N.S. Radio. That means your record is played for seven days. Four days went by, I was so thrilled. On day five, when I heard the first line, I thought it was me, but all of a sudden, I realized it wasn’t. At the end of the song it was announced, "the Moody Blues singing 'Go Now'". I was too out-done. This was the time of the English Invasion and the end of Bessie Banks' career, so I thought. America's DJs had stopped promoting American artists."

Banks' single was released in the US in January 1964. The Moody Blues' version was released in November (in the UK), and in the United States the following January.

She returned to the studio in early 1967, recording the single "I Can't Make It (Without You Baby)" for the Verve label. In 1974, she recorded singles for the Volt label, including "Try to Leave Me if You Can (I Bet You Can't Do It)" and "(Don't You Worry Baby) The Best Is Yet to Come".

Larry Banks also recorded under his own name, and both recorded with and produced his second wife Joan, who recorded as Jaibi. A compilation of recordings, including those by Bessie Banks, was issued as Larry Banks' Soul Family Album by Ace Records in 2007. At that time, it was reported that Bessie Banks "continues to sing though she confines herself to gospel music now".
