= Go Now =

1964 single by Bessie Banks

Single by Bessie Banks
- B-side: "It Sounds Like My Baby"
- Released: January 1964
- Length: 2:40
- Label: Tiger; Blue Cat
- Songwriters: Larry Banks; Milton Bennett
- Producer: Jerry Leiber and Mike Stoller

Bessie Banks singles chronology
"Do It Now" (1963)	"Go Now" (1964)	"I Can't Make It (Without You Baby)" (1967)

"Go Now" is a song composed by Larry Banks and Milton Bennett and first recorded by Bessie Banks, released as a single in January 1964. The best-known version was recorded by the Moody Blues and released the same year.

== Bessie Banks version ==
The song was first recorded by Larry Banks's former wife, Bessie Banks. A 1962 demo recording by Bessie of the song was heard by songwriters and record producers Jerry Leiber and Mike Stoller, who re-recorded it in late 1963, with arrangement by Gary Sherman and backing vocals from Dee Dee Warwick and Cissy Houston. The single was first released in early 1964 on their Tiger label, and later reissued on the Blue Cat label, the R&B/soul imprint of Red Bird. Her version reached No. 40 on the Cashbox R&B singles chart.

Bessie Banks later commented:

I remember 1963 Kennedy was assassinated; it was announced over the radio. At the time, I was rehearsing in the office of Leiber and Stoller. We called it a day. Everyone was in tears. "Come back next week and we will be ready to record 'Go Now'"; and we did so. I was happy and excited that maybe this time I'll make it. 'Go Now' was released in January 1964, and right away it was chosen Pick Hit of the Week on W.I.N.S. Radio. That means your record is played for seven days. Four days went by, I was so thrilled. On day five, when I heard the first line, I thought it was me, but all of a sudden, I realized it wasn't. At the end of the song it was announced, "The Moody Blues singing 'Go Now'." I was too out-done. This was the time of the English Invasion and the end of Bessie Banks' career, so I thought. America's DJs had stopped promoting American artists.

Banks' recollections are questionable, because her single was released in the US in January 1964, and The Moody Blues' version was not released until November 1964 in the UK and January 1965 in North America.

The Bessie Banks version is included on the soundtrack of the film Stonewall (1995) and on the "Red Bird Story".

== The Moody Blues version ==
"Go Now"

Single by The Moody Blues

from the album The Magnificent Moodies
- B-side: "It's Easy Child" (UK); "Lose Your Money" (US)
- Released: 13 November 1964
- Genre: Pop
- Length: 3:14
- Label: Decca (UK); London (US)
- Songwriters: Larry Banks; Milton Bennett
- Producer: A. Wharton

The Moody Blues singles chronology
"Steal Your Heart Away" (1964)	"Go Now" (1964)	"I Don't Want to Go On Without You" (1965)

"Go Now!" (adding an exclamation mark) was made popular internationally later in 1964 when the Moody Blues, an English beat group from Birmingham, recorded it, with Denny Laine on guitar and lead vocals. When Laine first heard Bessie Banks's version, he immediately told the rest of the band that they needed to record the song.

=== Promotion and chart success ===
At the time the single was released, it was being promoted on television with one of the first purpose-made promotional films in the pop era, produced and directed by their co-manager Alex Wharton (the father of DJ Sonny Wharton). The song reached No. 1 in the UK Singles Chart in late January 1965. In the US, "Go Now!" did not enter the Billboard Hot 100 until mid-February 1965; it peaked at No. 10 and No. 2 in Canada. Billboard described the song as having a "rare beat" and "interesting gospel-like piano support." The next chart successes for The Moody Blues were "Nights in White Satin" and "Tuesday Afternoon" in 1968.

In a 2018 interview with author Robert Rodriguez on the podcast "Something About the Beatles", White Album engineer Chris Thomas recalled that George Harrison asked him to add a piano part to the Beatles song "Long Long Long" in the style of the Moody Blues' version of "Go Now".

Ultimate Classic Rock critic Nick DeRiso rated it as the Moody Blues' greatest song, saying that "Laine's scorching take on this old Bessie Banks track is as emotionally gripping as it is career-makingly important." Classic Rock critic Malcolm Dome rated it as the Moody Blues' 10th greatest song, saying that it's "catchy yet also calmly intricate."

=== Later performances and popular culture ===
The Moody Blues had little success with singles after "Go Now!" in the mid-1960s, which led to Laine's departure from the band, later being replaced by Justin Hayward. Bassist Clint Warwick had already departed the band by this time. Rodney Clark had replaced him for a while before they recruited John Lodge. With the new lineup, the Moody Blues continued to perform "Go Now!" for a short time, until they began writing their own material. Hayward sang the song during his first year with the band, and Ray Thomas attempted to sing it a couple of times.

Laine continued to perform the song in concert during his years in Wings. On June 21–23, 1976, at The Forum in Inglewood, California, Laine performed "Go Now!" with the rest of the group, accompanying himself on piano; Paul McCartney was on bass and vocals, Linda McCartney on vocals, Jimmy McCulloch on lead guitar, and Joe English on drums. This version of "Go Now" appears on the Wings Over America live album and another live recording in a studio setting on One Hand Clapping recorded in 1974 but released in 2024. He also sang the song at the Birmingham Heart Beat Charity Concert 1986 raising money for the local children's hospital.

In January 1997, "Go Now" (without an exclamation mark) was released on The Very Best of the Moody Blues; its release on this album was the first time it had been released on a Moody Blues compilation album. "Go Now" was also released on the subsequent Moody Blues two-disc compilation album Anthology.

Laine later covered "Go Now" in 2007 on his album Performs the Hits of Wings. "Go Now!" was performed by Denny Laine with The Fab Faux on December 11, 2010, at Terminal 5 in New York City, and February 26, 2011, at the State Theatre in Easton, Pennsylvania.

The version by The Moody Blues was used on the satirical British television show Spitting Image in a scene concerning then Prime Minister Margaret Thatcher. It is also played over the closing credits of the films 45 Years (2015) and Bull (2021).

=== Reception ===
Ultimate Classic Rock critic Nick DeRiso rated the Moody Blues' version as Denny Laine's second best song, saying that it "underscored the gritty R&B elements that would disappear once Justin Hayward arrived and took the Moody Blues in a different direction."

=== Charts ===
Chart (1964–1965)	Peak position
Australia (Kent Music Report)	12
Canada Top Singles (RPM)	2
France (SNEP)	15
Hong Kong (RTHK)	6
Ireland (IRMA)	4
Netherlands (Dutch Top 40)	8
Netherlands (Single Top 100)	10
Sweden (Kvällstoppen)	17
UK Singles (Official Charts)	1
US Billboard Hot 100	10
US Cashbox Top 100	6
US Record World 100 Top Pops	8

=== Credits ===
- Denny Laine: guitar, lead vocal
- Clint Warwick: bass guitar, backing vocal
- Mike Pinder: piano, backing vocal
- Ray Thomas: backing vocal
- Graeme Edge: drums

== Other covers ==
- It was covered by Swedish pop band Lucas in 1967 as their debut single following their victory in Sveriges Radio's Pop Band Competition. Recorded in September of that year and backed by a rendition of "Parchman Farm", the single managed to reach number four on Tio i Topp on October 28, 1967, and later also number 11 on Kvällstoppen on December 5 of that year. Because of pianist Janne Lucas Persson's own interpretation of the song, it drove audiences wild; as a result it became one of the best-known songs in Sweden in 1968. Both sides were featured on their eponymous debut album in 1969.
- In 1972, David Cassidy included a cover on his album Rock Me Baby.
- In 1980, Denny Laine recorded a remake for his Japanese Tears album.
- In 1981, a cover of the song appeared on the albumState Of Shock by The Elektrics on Capitol Records, produced by Lance Quinn and Tony Bongiovi.
- In 1992, Tin Machine's cover was released on the covers compilation album, Ruby Trax.
- In 2005, Ozzy Osbourne's cover was released on the covers compilation album, Under Cover.
- In 2008, the English soul and pop band Simply Red released a cover as the lead single of their fourth greatest hits, Simply Red 25: The Greatest Hits (2008).

== See also ==
- List of number-one singles from the 1960s (UK)
