= Deliver Your Children =

- Cover in the Netherlands, where it charted

Single by Wings

from the album London Town
- A-side: "I've Had Enough"
- Released: 16 June 1978
- Recorded: May – November 1977
- Studio: Record Plant Mobile Studio, Fair Carol Yacht, Virgin Islands; Abbey Road Studios, London
- Genre: Rock
- Length: 4:17
- Label: Parlophone/EMI (UK); Capitol (US)
- Songwriters: Paul McCartney; Denny Laine
- Producer: Paul McCartney

Wings singles chronology
"With a Little Luck" (1978)	"I've Had Enough" / "Deliver Your Children" (1978)	"London Town" (1978)

"Deliver Your Children" is a song written by Denny Laine and Paul McCartney that was first issued on Wings' 1978 album London Town. It was also released as the B-side of Wings' single "I've Had Enough". In the Netherlands, it received enough airplay to be ranked on the national charts along with its A-side, and joint single reached No. 13. On some charts within the Netherlands "Deliver Your Children" was ranked alone on the single charts, and it reached No. 9 on the Stichting Nederlandse Top 40 chart. Laine also released solo recordings of the song.

== Writing and recording ==
Laine wrote most of the song himself and McCartney helped him complete it. It was originally written during the Venus and Mars sessions in 1975. Laine's original title for the song was "Feel the Love," despite the fact that the song lyrics do not contain the phrase, but McCartney suggested the revised title. It was recorded on the yacht Fair Carol in the Virgin Islands in May 1977; at the time Linda McCartney was pregnant with her and Paul's fourth child, James. Laine sings the lead vocal and both Laine and McCartney play acoustic guitar. Laine also plays the Spanish guitar solos. McCartney also plays bass guitar, and both he and Linda McCartney provide backing vocals.

== Lyrics and music ==
"Deliver Your Children" is an uptempo song. Music professor Vincent Benitez and Beatles biographer Robert Rodriguez describe it as being "folksy." It is one of two songs on London Town primarily written by Laine with children as its theme. The verses describe a variety of unlucky experiences the singer has had, including getting caught in a rain storm, dealing with an unfaithful lover, and dealing with an unscrupulous repairman who can't fix his truck. Both Benitez and McCartney biographer John Blaney describe the verses as "rambling." The refrain contrasts by exhorting the listener to deliver the children to the good life and make things right for them.

According to Benitez, the song sounds as if it is in the key of A minor but the guitars are actually played in the key of D minor with a capo on the seventh fret. Actually, the verses are neither in a major or a minor key, but in a Dorian mode, which emphasizes their harsh imagery. The first two verses, the guitar solo near the end and the outro are in D-Dorian, while the last verses are in G-Dorian. The refrain is in C major, contrasting the verses and emphasizing its more hopeful lyrics.

== Reception ==
Rolling Stone Magazine critic Janet Maslin described "Deliver Your Children" as "wonderful" and one of the best songs on London Town. Rodriguez regards it as the best of McCartney's and Laine's collaborations. Beatle biographers Roy Carr and Tony Tyler described it as "minor key Nashville chunkachuck" displaying "superior craftmanship." Music critic Joel McNally regards it as a "good" song, describing it as "an upbeat number that dares to use some acoustic guitars in an electronic age. Author Giuseppe Rausa regards "Deliver Your Children" as one of the few memorable songs on London Town, describing it as a pleasant, quick, country music-like song.

The song was featured on The 7" Singles Box in 2022 and on the deluxe edition of Wings in 2025.

== Personnel ==
- Paul McCartney – acoustic guitar, bass, co-lead vocals
- Denny Laine – lead vocals, acoustic and Spanish guitars, backing vocals
- Joe English – drums
- Jimmy McCulloch – acoustic guitar
- Linda McCartney – backing vocals
