= Girlfriend (Paul McCartney song) =

1978 song by British-American rock band Wings

Song by Wings

from the album London Town
- Language: English
- Released: 31 March 1978
- Recorded: 14 February 1977
- Genre: Pop rock; soft rock
- Length: 4:39
- Label: Parlophone; EMI
- Songwriter: Paul McCartney
- Producer: Paul McCartney

"Girlfriend" is a song by British rock band Wings, from their 1978 album London Town. It was written by Wings frontman Paul McCartney, who originally intended it to be sung by Michael Jackson. Jackson then covered the song the following year on his 1979 album Off the Wall, and in 1980 it was released (in the UK only) as the 5th and final single of that album.

== Background ==
McCartney thought of "Girlfriend" as a song that Michael Jackson might like to record, and mentioned this to Jackson at a party in Hollywood. Jackson had stated in interviews with the music press in the 1970s that he was a fan of the Beatles and the chance to record a McCartney original helped to inspire his next project. However, McCartney ended up recording it himself with his band Wings, and it was issued in 1978 on the album London Town.

Kingsport Times-News critic Michael Clark regarded the song as the better of the two Bee Gees' sendups on London Town, "With a Little Luck" being the other. He also regarded it as one of the two best songs on the album, along with "I've Had Enough", praising the "light, bouncy melody" and the falsetto singing added to the "sweet backing harmonies" whenever the word "girlfriend" is sung. On the other hand, Hartford Courant critic Henry McNulty regarded it as one of the Wings' weakest songs since "Wild Life", criticising its harmonies and lyrics, and finding only the "mildly exciting guitar line" to be worthy of even faint praise.

Wings' recording was featured on the compilation albums Wingspan: Hits and History in 2001 and the deluxe edition of Pure McCartney in 2016.

== Personnel ==
- Paul McCartney – vocals, bass, acoustic and electric guitars, drums, electric piano, synthesizers, possible piano
- Linda McCartney – keyboards, backing vocals
- Denny Laine – acoustic and electric guitars, backing vocals, possible piano

== Michael Jackson version ==
"Girlfriend"
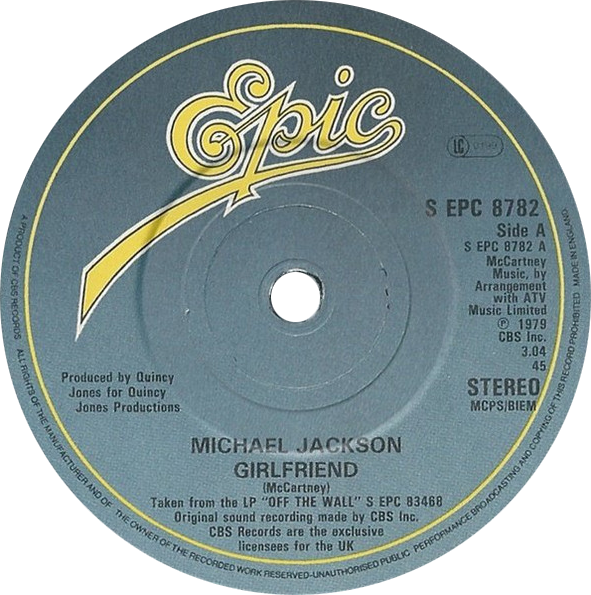
- Side A of UK vinyl single

Single by Michael Jackson

from the album Off the Wall
- B-side: "Bless His Soul" (with the Jacksons)
- Released: July 4, 1980
- Recorded: June 1979
- Genre: Pop; R&B
- Length: 3:05
- Label: Epic
- Songwriter: Paul McCartney
- Producer: Quincy Jones

Michael Jackson singles chronology
"She's Out of My Life" (1980)	"Girlfriend" (1980)	"The Girl Is Mine" (1982)

Quincy Jones heard the song and suggested it as a possible track for Jackson to record for his 1979 album Off the Wall, not aware that the song had been written for Jackson in the first place. Jackson's recording omitted the middle eight heard in McCartney's version. It was issued exclusively in the UK in 1980, as the fifth and final single from the Off the Wall album.

McCartney and Jackson subsequently worked together on "The Girl Is Mine" from Jackson's Thriller, as well as "Say Say Say" and "The Man", from McCartney's Pipes of Peace. In 1985, Jackson acquired the ATV Music Publishing catalog (which held the rights to nearly every Beatles song) uncontested by McCartney. According to McCartney, they "drifted apart" after he talked to Jackson about getting a "raise" and Jackson did not act on it. Cash Box said that Jackson's version was "rendered brilliantly".

=== Personnel ===
- Produced by Quincy Jones
- Recorded and mixed by Bruce Swedien
- Lead and background vocals: Michael Jackson
- Bass: Louis Johnson
- Drums: John Robinson
- Rhodes piano: Greg Phillinganes
- Synthesizer: David Foster, George Duke
- Synthesizer programming: Steve Porcaro and George Duke
- Guitar: Wah Wah Watson and Marlo Henderson
- Horns arranged by Jerry Hey and performed by The Seawind Horns:
  - Trumpet and flugelhorn: Jerry Hey
  - Tenor, alto saxophones and flute: Larry Williams
  - Baritone, tenor saxophones and flute: Kim Hutchcroft
  - Trombone: William Reichenbach
  - Trumpet: Gary Grant
- Alto sax solo: Larry Williams
- Rhythm arrangement by Quincy Jones, Tom Bahler and Greg Phillinganes
- Vocal arrangement by Michael Jackson and Quincy Jones

== Certifications ==
Region	Certification	Certified units/sales
New Zealand (RMNZ)	Gold	15,000^{‡}
^{‡} Sales+streaming figures based on certification alone.
