= Backwards Traveller/Cuff Link =

"Backwards Traveller"/"Cuff Link"

Single by Wings

from the album London Town
- A-side: "With a Little Luck"
- Released: 20 March 1978
- Recorded: 25 October – 1 December 1977
- Studio: Abbey Road Studios, London
- Genre: Synth-pop, synth-funk
- Length: 1:07 (Backwards Traveller); 2:03 (Cuff Link)
- Label: Parlophone (UK); Capitol (US)
- Songwriter: Paul McCartney
- Producer: Paul McCartney

Wings singles chronology
"Mull of Kintyre" (1977)	"Backwards Traveller"/"Cuff Link" (1978)	"I've Had Enough" (1978)

"Backwards Traveller"/"Cuff Link" is a medley of two short songs written by Paul McCartney that was first released on Wings' 1978 album London Town. The medley was also released as the B-side of Wings' US No. 1 single "With a Little Luck". Both "Backwards Traveller" and "Cuff Link" were recorded in October 1977 and completed in January 1978. By this point in the London Town recording sessions, guitarist Jimmy McCulloch and drummer Joe English had left the band, so the songs were recorded by only McCartney, Linda McCartney and Denny Laine. Both songs were included on The 7" Singles Box in 2022.

== "Backwards Traveller" ==
"Backwards Traveller" is only a little more than a minute long. It is a "mid-tempo rocker" in the key of C major. The song consists of a verse followed by two repetitions of the refrain. The lyrics are about the singer going back in time while "sailing songs" and "wailing on the moon." Paul McCartney plays drums, bass guitar, acoustic guitar and keyboards. According to music professor Vincent Benitez, the organ arrangement with its repeating chords gives the song a "retrospective, 1960s-style sound".

Rolling Stone critic Janet Maslin praises the beginning of "Backwards Traveller" as "brilliant, jolting hard-rock" but laments that it ends quickly as if no one could be bothered to complete it. Author Howard Sounes also complains that the song sounds "half-finished". Chip Madinger and Mark Easter likewise believe that the song had more potential than its ultimate fate as the prelude to "Cuff Link". Author John Blaney describes "Backwards Traveller" as "a typical McCartney pot-boiler". Music critic Tom Waseleski describes it as "a swinging little rocker."

A demo version of "Backwards Traveller" featuring drums, drum machine, keyboard and vocals has been released on several bootleg albums. Neil Hamburger covered "Backwards Traveller" on his 2019 Drag City album Still Dwelling, in an ambitious version with a more expansive arrangement by Erik Paparozzi, who was the bass player in Denny Laine's band.

== "Cuff Link" ==
"Cuff Link" is an instrumental in the key of D minor. Its original title was "Off the Cuff Link". Perhaps the most interesting feature of "Cuff Link" is the use of a Moog synthesizer to sound like a sitar. Blaney describes the song as "uninspired", and Benitez considers it "unimaginative", but author Mark Bowen regards it as a predecessor to McCartney's experiments with electro-pop on the 1980 album McCartney II. Music journalist Ian Peel also notes its electronic pop elements, which are also present in parts of "With a Little Luck". In 2013 Classic Rock Review described it as a "synth-driven funk instrumental" which "may have sounded hip in 1978 but sounds dated today." "Cuff Link" has proven more popular and regarded by younger generations, with Rough Trade writer Huw Thomas citing it as a highlight of London Town, referring to it as one of McCartney's "most overlooked experiments".

== Personnel ==
According to The Paul McCarney Project:

"Backwards Traveller"

- Paul McCartney – lead vocals, acoustic guitar, electric guitar, bass, synthesizer, drums
- Linda McCartney – backing vocals, keyboards
- Denny Laine – backing vocals, acoustic guitar, electric guitar

"Cuff Link"

- Paul McCartney – possible bass, synthesizer, drums
- Linda McCartney – possible keyboards
- Denny Laine – synthesizer
