= I'm Carrying =

Single by Wings

from the album London Town
- A-side: "London Town"
- Released: 26 August 1978
- Recorded: 5 May 1977
- Studio: Record Plant Mobile Studio, Fair Carol Yacht, Virgin Islands; AIR, London
- Genre: Soft rock
- Length: 2:44
- Label: Parlophone/EMI (UK); Capitol (US)
- Songwriter: Paul McCartney
- Producer: Paul McCartney

Wings singles chronology
| "I've Had Enough" (1978) | "I'm Carrying" (1978) | "Goodnight Tonight" (1979) |

"I'm Carrying" is a song written by Paul McCartney that was first released on Wings' 1978 album London Town. It was also released as the B-side of the "London Town" single. In 2003 it was later released on the soundtrack to the film The In-Laws.

== Lyrics and music ==
"I'm Carrying" is a gentle love song. Although Linda McCartney, Paul's wife, was a member of Wings, the song was not inspired by her but rather by a former girlfriend of Paul McCartney's. The song has a simple structure, with two verses and a refrain. In the first verse, McCartney sings that he will come to his lover's room after an absence bringing gifts and a carnation. In the second verse, he sings that he has been away for a long time and wonders if his return will lack style. The refrain simply notes that he is carrying something for his lover.

"I'm Carrying" is in the key of E major and based on four chords. McCartney originally recorded the song accompanied by just his acoustic guitar during the London Town sessions aboard the stern of the yacht Fair Carol in the Virgin Islands on 5 May 1977. The song was recorded in one take and according to engineer Tom Anderson, McCartney was "enclosed in a wooden ‘isolation’ area we built out of plywood." In December 1977, he overdubbed orchestral strings and he also overdubbed his own playing of an electric guitar using a Gizmo. The Gizmo is a device invented by 10cc members Kevin Godley and Lol Creme, which allows a guitar to be played by vibrating the strings rather than plucking them.

== Critical reception ==
Author John Blaney notes that "I'm Carrying" expresses sentiments similar to those McCartney sang on the Beatles' "Yesterday," noting that "I'm Carrying" is "less adventurous melodically but no less welcoming." Allmusic critic Stephen Thomas Erlewine calls it "nice" and "understated." George Harrison chose "I'm Carrying" as his favorite melodic song from London Town, describing it to Rolling Stone in 1979 as "sensational". CD Review described the song as a "silly love song that's sweet, simple, and tuneful." Billboard Magazine's Timothy White considers the song one of McCartney's post-Beatle peaks. Jim Beviglia of Culture Sonar described the melody as being "as romantic as a moonlit slow dance."

== Other appearances ==
Wings' version of "I'm Carrying" was used in the soundtrack for the film The In-Laws in 2003. The song is also incorporated in the soundtrack to the Greg MacGillivray film To the Arctic 3D, including for a scene in which a mother polar bear plays with her cubs.

Sham Rock covered "I'm Carrying" on their 2004 album The Album. Guitarist Phil Keaggy played the song with Paul McCartney at the wedding of Linda McCartney's sister Laura Eastman.

Wings' recording was also featured on The 7" Singles Box in 2022.

== Personnel ==
According to The Paul McCartney Project:

- Paul McCartney – lead vocals, acoustic guitar, electric guitar, synthesizers
