= London Town =

London Town may refer to:

== Places ==
- London or London Town, United Kingdom
- Londontowne, Maryland, a census-designated place and site of the former London Town seaport, now operated as Historic London Town and Gardens

== Film ==
- London Town (1946 film), a British musical film
- London Town (2016 film), an American musical film

== Music ==
- London Town (Wings album) (1978)
  - "London Town" (Wings song) (1978)
- "London Town", a song by Light of the World (1981)
- "London Town" (Bucks Fizz song) (1983)
- "London Town", a song by Bellowhead from Burlesque (2006)
- London Town (Kano album) (2007)
- "London Town", a single from Life Is Eazi, Vol. 2 – Lagos to London (2018)

== See also ==
- London (disambiguation)
