= London Town (Wings album) =

Studio album by Wings
- Released: 31 March 1978 (Note: The book Wings: The Story of a Band on the Run lists the release date as 27 March 1978, while Paul McCartney's website lists 30 March.)
- Recorded: February 1977 – January 1978
- Studios: Abbey Road and AIR, London; Waterlemon Cay, Virgin Islands (aboard the yacht Fair Carol)
- Genre: Soft rock
- Length: 51:06
- Labels: Parlophone (UK); Capitol (US)
- Producer: Paul McCartney

Wings chronology
Wings over America (1976)	London Town (1978)	Wings Greatest (1978)

Singles from London Town
- 1. "With a Little Luck" Released: 17 March 1978; 2. "I've Had Enough" Released: 2 June 1978; 3. "London Town" Released: 21 August 1978

London Town is the sixth studio album by the British–American rock group Wings. It was released on 31 March 1978, two years after its predecessor, Wings at the Speed of Sound. The album had a long and tumultuous gestation during which the band's tour plans for 1977 were cancelled, due to Linda McCartney becoming pregnant with her and Paul McCartney's fourth child and two members of Wings having departed, leaving the band as a trio comprising Paul, Linda and Denny Laine. Recording sessions were held intermittently over a period of a year, mainly at Abbey Road Studios in London and aboard a luxury yacht in the Virgin Islands.

London Town charted in the top five positions in the UK and the US. It failed to repeat the success of Wings' three previous albums, however, and received mostly unfavourable reviews from music critics. The lead single, "With a Little Luck", was a number 1 hit in the US, but the album's subsequent singles achieved only minor chart success. Also recorded during the sessions was the 1977 non-album single "Mull of Kintyre", which, until 1984, was the best-selling single in UK chart history and remains the UK's best-selling non-charity single to this day.

== Background ==
After the commercial success of 1976, with Wings at the Speed of Sound and the well-received Wings Over the World tour, Wings' leader Paul McCartney planned on making 1977 a similar year. In February, Wings began recording sessions at Abbey Road Studios, which continued until the end of March. Wings recorded five songs there: "Girls' School", "Name and Address", "London Town", "Children Children" and Linda McCartney's "B-Side to Seaside". The last was issued as the flip-side of the single "Seaside Woman" (issued under the name "Suzy and the Red Stripes"). The initial plan that Wings would tour in the US once more was thwarted by Linda's discovery that she was pregnant with her and Paul's fourth child. With the knowledge that they were not going to tour and had time at their disposal – and once again looking for different locales to record in – Wings found themselves moored on a yacht called Fair Carol in the Virgin Islands during May where several new songs were recorded. Reflecting the nautical locale, the album's working title was Water Wings.

Wings recorded eight tracks that would be included on London Town: "Café on the Left Bank", "I'm Carrying", "Deliver Your Children", "I've Had Enough", "With a Little Luck", "Famous Groupies", "Morse Moose and the Grey Goose" (the first section) and "Don't Let It Bring You Down". They also recorded "Find a Way Somehow", written by Denny Laine, which had already been included on 1973 on his album Ahh... Laine! Some of the tracks were recorded on the upper deck of the boat, as assistant engineer Tom Anderson told author Luca Perasi. The band and crew suffered injuries on the boat: Paul McCartney and lead guitarist Jimmy McCulloch suffered knee injuries from falling (the latter also went deaf in one ear) and engineer Geoff Emerick electrocuted his foot. Additionally, United States Customs officials raided the boats McCartney had rented, searching for marijuana; they received an official warning.

McCartney wrote and demoed the song "Girlfriend" in November 1974. Shortly after its release on London Town, American singer Michael Jackson covered it for his 1979 album Off the Wall. Although McCartney denied having written the song for him, he said in interviews at the time that it sounded like the Jackson 5, leading Jackson to cover it for Off the Wall.

As Linda's pregnancy progressed, the band halted the sessions for the album, except for the recording of a new track called "Mull of Kintyre" that August and the completion of the already begun "Girls' School". McCartney intended for the song to be an album track, but decided to release the two songs as a double A-side single in late 1977 – Wings' only new release that year.

Before the single's release came two defections from Wings: McCulloch was expelled from the band by McCartney and joined the Small Faces that September, and drummer Joe English had become homesick for America and returned home two months later. For the first time since 1973's Band on the Run, Wings were down to the core three of Paul, Linda and Denny Laine, as reflected on the picture sleeve of the single. According to author John Blaney, their departures affected Paul more than the departures of Henry McCullough and Denny Seiwell in 1973.

In November, two months after the birth of the McCartneys' son James, and shortly after sessions for London Town resumed, the Scottish tribute "Mull of Kintyre" was released to enormous commercial success. The song became the UK's biggest-selling single, outstripping the Beatles' largest seller "She Loves You". Although it would be topped in 1984 by Band Aid's "Do They Know It's Christmas?", "Mull of Kintyre" still ranks as the UK's fourth biggest-selling single and the largest-selling non-charity single.

Recording for London Town was completed with some final overdubbing in January 1978. "Morse Moose and the Grey Goose" was given an orchestral arrangement by Wil Malone. Malone went to McCartney's house in St. John's Wood to hear Paul play the song on the piano. The album was mastered by Nick Webb at Abbey Road on 27 January; Geoff Emerick oversaw the mastering of the American release, which John Golden underwent at Kendun Recorders.

== Artwork ==
The cover artwork depicts Paul, Linda and Laine in London on the River Thames, with the Tower Bridge in the background. The photograph was shot in black-and-white, while the back cover features a colour photograph of the trio in tropical attire. Paul explained at the time:

[The album] was started in London town, and it was finished in London town. And the opening track... is called 'London Town'. I suppose you could have called it any of the other titles, actually, but that was the one that seemed to fit the most. Then we had the idea on the cover to show London town as if it's in the Virgin Islands. On the back cover of the album, it's all London town looking like it's been moved to the Virgins.

Aubrey Powell, who designed several of Wings' prior albums, disliked the cover, believing it interfered with Hipgnosis's aesthetic that typically did not feature the artists on covers. He stated, "It was the one album cover that I really felt didn't work for me, I didn't like it at all."

== Release ==
An edited "With a Little Luck" b/w "Backwards Traveller/Cuff Link" was released as the lead single from the album on 17 March 1978 in the US, and a week later on 24 March in the UK. To promote it, Wings filmed a music video, directed by Michael Lindsay-Hogg, at Twickenham Studios in London. Featuring the band miming to the single edit, Lindsay-Hogg explained that the video was "simple" and intended to be "optimistic". The single was a commercial success, reaching number 5 on the UK singles chart and topping the US Billboard Hot 100, becoming McCartney's 26th US number-one single. To promote the upcoming album, McCartney conducted interviews with publications such as NME and the Liverpool Echo. In the US, Capitol conducted an extensive campaign featuring consumer and print advertising, posters and an animated billboard in Times Square, New York City.

London Town was released through Parlophone in the UK and Capitol Records in the US on 31 March 1978. (Note: The album was originally intended to be released the same day as the "With a Little Luck" single, but was delayed, reportedly because Paul wanted to make last-minute album cover changes.) In the charts, it peaked at number 4 on the UK Albums Chart, remaining in the top 100 for 23 weeks. In the US, it reached number 2, blocked by the Saturday Night Fever soundtrack, spending 28 weeks on the Billboard Top LPs & Tapes chart; it was McCartney's first album since Wild Life (1971) not to top the chart. It eventually sold over one million copies and was certified platinum by the Recording Industry Association of America (RIAA). The album was certified platinum in Australia on the day of its release. Shortly after the album's release, McCartney hired drummer Steve Holley and guitarist Laurence Juber to replace English and McCulloch, respectively.

Holley and Juber featured in the music video for the album's second single, "I've Had Enough", directed by Keith McMillan. The single, with "Deliver Your Children" as the B-side, was released on 2 June 1978 in the US and 16 June in the UK. Receiving mixed reviews, the single performed poorly, peaking at number 25 in the US and number 42 in the UK. Discussing the poor performance, McCartney said: "When it came out it was—I don't know really, just some of them don't make it. You can't spend your life sweating about the ones that don't make it." EMI released the title track, with "I'm Carrying" as the B-side, as the third single on 21 August in the US and 25 August in the UK. It also received mixed reviews and performed poorly, reaching number 39 in the US and number 60 in the UK. Ultimately, the album marked the end of Wings' commercial peak and the beginning of a minor commercial slump for McCartney.

Laine included versions of "Children Children" and "Deliver Your Children" on his 1996 album Wings at the Sound of Denny Laine.

== Critical reception ==
Professional ratings
Review scores
Source	Rating
AllMusic	4/5 stars
Christgau's Record Guide	B
The Essential Rock Discography	5/10
MusicHound Rock	2/5 stars
Q	2/5 stars
Record Mirror	3/5 stars
The Rolling Stone Album Guide	2/5 stars

London Town received generally unfavourable reviews from music critics. The Globe and Mail noted that "Wings remains one of the most consistently ineffective rock bands around... The records are nice when McCartney strums his guitar and sings songs to his kids but when Wings takes on heavy sounds it just doesn't work". John Rockwell of The New York Times wrote that "the music is prime McCartney ... his ear for tunes and for classically simple yet clever arrangements remains acute, and the result here is often delightful". In a mostly positive review for the Los Angeles Times, Robert Hilburn praised London Town as McCartney's "most confident and comfortable work". He found the music and arrangements "as solidly crafted as anything he has done in the '70s", but also noted that the album "lacks the hard, adventurous edges of Band on the Run and Venus and Mars." Billboard wrote that London Town proves McCartney "still has a flair for writing clean, intelligent rock'n'roll", praising the music, "varied" material and vocal performances.

Several reviewers criticised the album as being safe and failing to break new artistic ground. In NME, Bob Edmunds said the album contains "the familiar Wings mixture of medium to soft rock and MOR mawkishness", with lyrics that have "nothing in particular to say". In Rolling Stone, Janet Maslin described London Town as an album of "genial effortlessness". Continuing her mixed review, she said that it is "so lighthearted that the album's feeling of familial strength and affection is virtually the only thing that binds it to earth. Even the best songs here — and a couple of them, like 'Deliver Your Children' and 'Children Children', are just wonderful — sound as if Wings were only half trying." Writing for Record Mirror, Sheila Prophet said the album "ain't another Band on the Run". More negatively, Sounds magazine's Donna McAllister described London Town as "an acetate collection of nursery rhymes", one that she seemed personally offended by: "I'm humilated that [McCartney] has put me in a position where I have to slag him."

In a retrospective review for AllMusic, Stephen Thomas Erlewine called London Town an improvement over Wings at the Speed of Sound and "as satisfying" as Venus and Mars. Although he said it fails to reach the highs of those two albums, he ultimately calls "a laid-back, almost effortless collection of professional pop" and "one of [McCartney's] strongest albums". Writing for Ultimate Classic Rock, Michael Gallucci described London Town as one of McCartney's "most ambitious" efforts, particularly when compared to its predecessor, but ultimately found the album "scattered" and "unfocused", coming across as "lazy and bored". In his book Fab: An Intimate Life of Paul McCartney (2010), Howard Sounes criticised the album for sounding "distinctly old-fashioned" in a year when disco and punk rock were more mainstream. He also noted how its release coincided with the Rutles, a Beatles parody group, and their film All You Need Is Cash, which he believes may have impacted sales. Blaney called the album a disappointment.

== Aftermath and reissues ==
McCartney was reportedly displeased with Capitol in the US, where "Mull of Kintyre" was ignored by radio programmers; its B-side, "Girls School", reached only number 33 on the US charts. He was further dismayed at what he viewed as Capitol's lacklustre promotion for London Town. With his contract at an end, he signed up with Columbia Records for North America (remaining with EMI elsewhere in the world) and would stay there until 1984, before returning to Capitol in the US.

Capitol first reissued London Town on CD in June 1989; EMI followed in August. In 1993, London Town was remastered and reissued on CD as part of The Paul McCartney Collection series. "Mull of Kintyre" and "Girls' School" were added as bonus tracks.

== Track listing ==
All songs written by Paul McCartney, except where noted.

Side one

1. "London Town" (Paul McCartney, Denny Laine) – 4:10
2. "Cafe on the Left Bank" – 3:25
3. "I'm Carrying" – 2:44
4. "Backwards Traveller" – 1:07
5. "Cuff Link" – 2:03
6. "Children Children" (McCartney, Laine) – 2:20
7. "Girlfriend" – 4:31
8. "I've Had Enough" – 3:02

Side two

1. "With a Little Luck" – 5:45
2. "Famous Groupies" – 3:34
3. "Deliver Your Children" (McCartney, Laine) – 4:17
4. "Name and Address" – 3:07
5. "Don't Let It Bring You Down" (McCartney, Laine) – 4:34
6. "Morse Moose and the Grey Goose" (McCartney, Laine) – 6:27

Additional tracks on 1993 CD reissue

15. "Girls' School" – 4:38
16. "Mull of Kintyre" (McCartney, Laine) – 4:42

== Personnel ==
According to the liner notes and McCartney's website:

Wings

- Paul McCartney – lead vocals, guitars, bass, keyboards, drums, percussion, violin, flageolet, recorder
- Denny Laine – vocal (lead vocals on "Children Children" and "Deliver Your Children"), guitars, bass, keyboards, flageolet, recorder, percussion
- Linda McCartney – vocals, keyboards, percussion
- Jimmy McCulloch – guitar, percussion
- Joe English – vocals, drums, percussion, harmonica

Technical

- Paul McCartney – producer
- Geoff Emerick – engineer
- Pete Henderson – assistant engineer
- Mark Vigars – assistant engineer
- Steve Churchyard – assistant engineer

== Charts ==
=== Weekly charts ===
Chart (1978)	Peak position
Australian Kent Music Report Chart	3
Austrian Albums Chart	4
Canadian RPM Albums Chart	2
Dutch Mega Albums Chart	1
Japanese Oricon LPs Chart	4
New Zealand Albums Chart	4
Norwegian VG-lista Albums Chart	2
Spanish Albums Chart	9
Swedish Albums Chart	4
UK Albums Chart	4
US Billboard Top LPs & Tapes	2
US Cashbox albums chart	2
US Record World albums chart	2
West German Media Control Albums Chart	6

=== Year-end charts ===
Chart (1978)	Position
Australian Albums Chart	25
Austrian Albums Chart	12
Canadian Albums Chart	22
Dutch Albums Chart	16
French Albums Chart	11
Japanese Albums Chart	45
UK Albums Chart	24
US Billboard Top LPs & Tapes	56

== Certifications and sales ==
Region	Certification	Certified units/sales
Australia (ARIA)	Platinum	50,000^{^}
France (SNEP)	Gold	100,000^{*}
Germany (BVMI)	Gold	250,000^{^}
Japan (Oricon Charts)	—	86,000
Netherlands (NVPI)	Platinum	100,000^{^}
United Kingdom (BPI)	Gold	100,000^{^}
United States (RIAA)	Platinum	1,000,000^{^}
^{*} Sales figures based on certification alone.^{^} Shipments figures based on certification alone.
