= Running mate (disambiguation) =

A running mate is a person running on a joint ticket in an election.

Running Mate(s) or The Running Mate may also refer to:

- "Running Mates" (Family Guy), an episode
- "Running Mates" (The West Wing episode)
- Running Mates (1992 film), a film starring Diane Keaton and Ed Harris
- Running Mates (2000 film), a television film starring Tom Selleck and Laura Linney
- Running Mates (2011 film), a film produced by Nicholas Tabarrok
- The Running Mate, an Irish miniseries, winner of a 2008 Irish Film & Television Award
- Running Mate (TV series), a South Korean TV series
- The Running Mate, a novel by Joe Klein
