= Don't Let It Bring You Down =

Don't Let It Bring You Down may refer to:

- "Don't Let It Bring You Down (Neil Young song)", 1970
- "Don't Let It Bring You Down (Wings song)", 1978
