= Girls' School (song) =

Single by Wings
- A-side: "Mull of Kintyre" (double A-side)
- Released: 11 November 1977
- Recorded: 14 February 1977
- Studio: Abbey Road, London
- Genre: Rock
- Length: 4:38
- Label: Capitol
- Songwriter: Paul McCartney
- Producer: Paul McCartney

Wings singles chronology
"Seaside Woman" (1977)	"Girls' School" / "Mull of Kintyre" (1977)	"With a Little Luck" (1978)

"Girls' School" is a song by Wings released in 1977.

== Recording and release ==
Written and produced by Paul McCartney during the first sessions for London Town (before recording was stopped due to Linda McCartney's pregnancy), it was released as a double A-side single with "Mull of Kintyre". Accordingly, it was part of the band's sole UK number one, spending nine weeks at the top in December 1977 and January 1978.

Although "Mull of Kintyre" was initially the more air-played song, the AA side was latterly supported by broadcasters including Radio Luxembourg which helped the single sustain its reign at the top of the charts until the beginning of February 1978. "Girls' School" was in complete contrast to its flip side, being an uptempo rock song.

Record World called it "an energetic rocker a la 'Junior's Farm'."

In the United States, "Girls' School" was the more prominently played side, but it only reached number 33 on the Billboard Hot 100 and number 34 in Canada.

"Girls' School" was never performed live by McCartney or Wings and was never featured on a compilation album until The 7" Singles Box in 2022.

== Personnel ==
According to the author Luca Perasi:

- Paul McCartney – lead and backing vocals, bass, electric guitar, piano
- Linda McCartney – backing vocals, Moog synthesiser
- Denny Laine – backing vocals, electric guitar
- Jimmy McCulloch – electric guitar, slide guitar
- Joe English – drums

== Charts ==
=== Weekly charts ===
Chart (1977–1978)	Peak position
Canada Top Singles (RPM)	34
US Billboard Hot 100	33
