= David Schwartz =

American composer

David Schwartz is an American composer, known for his scoring of the music for several television series. He composed most of the songs for Arrested Development, and he returned as the series composer for the fourth season, which debuted on Netflix.

Schwartz attended the School of Visual Arts in New York City and the Berklee College of Music in Boston. He began composing music for television and film in 1990. The theme for his first network television series, Northern Exposure, resulted in a Grammy nomination. "Theme from Northern Exposure", credited to Schwartz, hit #15 on the Billboard Adult Contemporary chart in late 1992. He scored every episode of the show's six season run.

He has scored themes for television productions including Reaper, Two of Us, The Good Place, Deadwood, Arrested Development, Carpoolers, Running Wilde, and Beverly Hills, 90210. His film credits include You Stupid Man.

He is the father of singer-songwriter Lucy Schwartz, with whom he has collaborated on several projects, including the music for Arrested Development and Rutherford Falls.

== Awards and nominations ==
- Emmy Award, 2022: Lucy and Desi (for Outstanding Music Composition for a Documentary Series or Special (Original Dramatic Score))
- Emmy Award nomination, 2013: Arrested Development (for Outstanding Music Composition for a Series - "Flight of The Phoenix")
- BMI TV Music Award, 2007: Rules of Engagement
- BMI TV Music Award, 2006: Rules of Engagement
- Emmy Award nomination, 2004: Deadwood (for Outstanding Main Title Theme Music)
- Emmy Award nomination, 2002: Wolf Lake (for Outstanding Main Title Theme Music)
- BMI TV Music Award, 2001: Leap of Faith
- BMI TV Music Award, 1994: Northern Exposure
- BMI TV Music Award, 1993: Northern Exposure
- BMI TV Music Award, 1992: Northern Exposure
- Grammy nomination, 1992: Northern Exposure theme
