= Mull of Kintyre (song) =

Single by Wings
- A-side: "Girls' School" (double A-side)
- Released: 11 November 1977
- Recorded: 8–9 August, 3–4 October 1977
- Studio: Spirit of Ranachan, Campbeltown
- Genre: Scottish folk
- Length: 4:45; 3:30 (radio edit)
- Label: Parlophone; Capitol
- Songwriters: Paul McCartney; Denny Laine
- Producer: Paul McCartney

Wings singles chronology
"Seaside Woman" (1977)	"Mull of Kintyre" / "Girls' School" (1977)	"With a Little Luck" (1978)

Music video
- "Mull of Kintyre" on YouTube

"Mull of Kintyre" is a song by the British rock band Wings, released in November 1977 as a double A-side single with "Girls' School". Written by Paul McCartney and Denny Laine, the song is a Scottish folk ballad inspired by McCartney's love for the Scottish countryside, specifically the Kintyre peninsula and its headland, the Mull of Kintyre; McCartney has owned a farm near there since 1966. The song was recorded in August 1977 at McCartney's Spirit of Ranachan Studio in Campbeltown, with the Campbeltown Pipe Band providing bagpipes and drums. During the session, Wings member Jimmy McCulloch was fired for poor behaviour. An overdub session occurred in October; Joe English left the band shortly after, leaving Wings a three-piece.

"Mull of Kintyre" stylistically stood apart from the burgeoning punk rock movement in the United Kingdom. Three music videos were made for the song, two of which featured the members of Wings and the Campbeltown Pipe Band. Despite mixed critical reviews, the single was a major commercial success in Britain, becoming the 1977 Christmas number one. It has sold over two million copies in the UK and remains one of the country's best-selling singles of all time. Outside Britain, it topped the charts in eight other coutries, but its British-centric subject and sound brought it relative failure in the United States. The song turned the Kintyre peninsula into a tourist attraction. McCartney has performed "Mull of Kintyre" live numerous times since its release.

== Writing ==
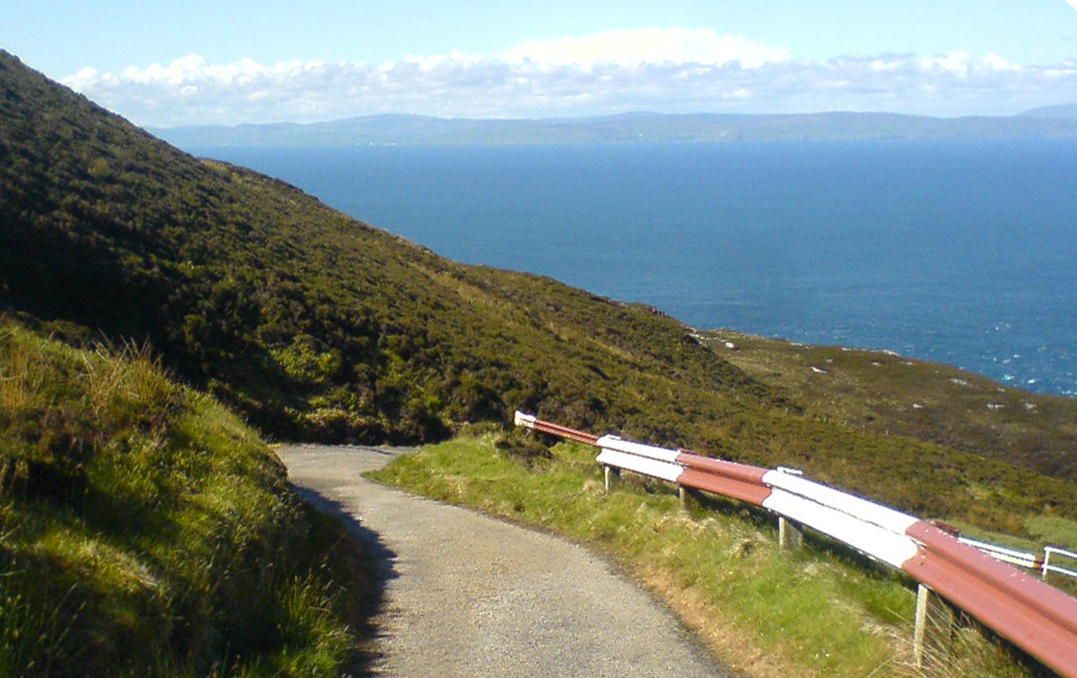
The Mull of Kintyre, the song's subject, in 2007.

Paul McCartney began writing "Mull of Kintyre" in 1974. It was inspired by his love for the Scottish countryside, specifically the titular Mull of Kintyre on the southwestern tip of the Kintyre peninsula, where he bought a farm in 1966. (Note: As of 2026, McCartney still owns the farm, although he does not spend as much time there as he used to.) McCartney explained how the song came into being:

It occurred to me that no great Scottish songs had been written for quite a while. I looked into it: all the bagpipe stuff was from the previous century and some of the popular folk songs were really old—and, I noticed, written by Englishmen. I wondered if I could write one, too—I certainly loved Scotland enough, so I came up with a song about where we were living: an area called Mull of Kintyre. It was a love song really, about how I enjoyed being there and imagining I was travelling away and wanting to get back there.

He recorded a piano demo in 1974 at his own Rude Studio, in which the song's title, main melody and some of the lyrics are already formed; (Note: According to Allan Kozinn and Adrian Sinclair, the entire chorus line was formed, although McCartney had one line for the verses.) this later appeared on a bootleg titled The Piano Tape. "Mull of Kintyre" was then completed in July 1977 with the assistance of his Wings bandmate Denny Laine: "We sat outside with a bottle of whiskey one afternoon in the hills of Kintyre and wrote the song. Paul had written the chorus, but we wrote the rest of it together, and most of the lyrics were mine." (Note: In 1986, Laine, following his departure from Wings in 1981, sold his royalty share for the song for a lump sum of £135,000.) Laine believed his input can be "strongly felt" in the following verse:

Far have I travelled and much have I seen
Dark distant mountains with valleys of green
Past painted deserts, the sunsets on fire
As he carries me home to the Mull of Kintyre

McCartney envisioned the song with bagpipes, so he invited Tony Wilson, the Pipe Major of the Campbeltown Pipe Band, to his farm to help work out the arrangements. Unfamiliar with writing for bagpipes, McCartney adjusted the song's key from A major to D major. McCartney and Laine recorded two demos of the song, one before and the other after meeting with Wilson. Both use a synthesiser to mimic the bagpipe parts, while the second includes a vocal. (Note: These demos later appeared on the bootleg Home Demos.) According to author Luca Perasi, the Pipe Band underwent "a month of rehearsals" for the song.

== Recording ==
"Mull of Kintyre" was recorded from 8 to 9 August 1977 at McCartney's High Park Farm in Campbeltown, Scotland, where a newly renovated mobile studio (from London's RAK Studios) was installed in a barn; McCartney dubbed it the Spirit of Ranachan Studio. The basic track was recorded outside, with McCartney and Laine on acoustic guitars and the former singing. To account for wind noise, a sock owned by McCartney's personal assistant John Hammel was placed over the microphone. Flying insects almost ruined the session's tapes, but the engineers were able to clean them. McCartney produced the recording and Geoff Emerick, along with Tim Summerhayes and Mark Vigars, engineered it. The same day, Wings member Jimmy McCulloch was fired from the band by McCartney for poor behaviour at the farm. (Note: McCulloch announced his departure from Wings in September.)

The next day, the Campbeltown Pipe Band recorded their parts while dressed in full kilts. They consisted of 14 members: bagpipers Tony Wilson, Ian McKerral, David McIvor, John Lang Brown, Archie Coffield, John McGeachy and Dougie Lang; and drummers Jimmy McGeachy, David Hastie, Campbell Maloney, Ian Campbell, Tommy Blue, John MacCallum and Ian MacKenzie. The bagpipe players were recorded in the barn, while the drums were recorded outdoors; for the former, Emerick set up only a few room mics to adjust for the volume of the instruments. (Note: Emerick normally placed microphones close to the instruments, but the instruments' loud volume interfered with that. In 1985, Emerick said: "So we used a few room mics and a couple closer to get the drones rather than the chanter part.") After the drums finished, McCartney yelled "Whoo-hooo!", which can be heard in the final track. The night ended with a party celebrating the session. McCartney and Laine began editing and mixing on 10 August.

An overdubbing session for "Mull of Kintyre" took place on 3 and 4 October 1977 at Abbey Road Studios in London. A film crew for Melvyn Bragg's new ITV programme The South Bank Show taped the session. McCartney overdubbed another bass line, a new vocal part to replace his guide vocal as well as backing vocals by himself, Linda McCartney, and Laine, and two members of the Alan Parsons Project (guitarist Ian Bairnson and bassist David Paton). (Note: The Alan Parsons Project were recording their 1978 album Pyramid in the adjacent Studio Three.) Bairnson later said on his website: "While at Abbey Road recording 'I Robot' and 'Two's a Crowd', some guy in the studio next door enlisted Ian and David to provide some authentic Scottish backing vocals to a song he was working on." A few days after the session, Wings drummer Joe English left the band due to homesickness and payment-related issues. (Note: McCartney announced English's departure from Wings in November.) Although author Luca Perasi credited English with "Mull of Kintyre"'s drums part, authors Allan Kozinn and Adrian Sinclair state that English's only contribution was being a "human metronome" during the recording of the basic track.

Wings had been working on their album London Town throughout 1977. After recording "Mull of Kintyre", McCartney felt the song would feel out of place on the album and contemplated releasing it as a single. At first unsure of the song's potential in the charts, McCartney eventually decided to release it as a double A-side single with "Girls' School", a rock song recorded in February for London Town. EMI's marketing manager Bob Mercer assisted in the decision; McCartney was convinced it "wouldn't sell a copy" until Mercer showed faith in the songs. McCartney said at the time: "I've got past the stage when I really worried too much if I am in fashion or not. ... [You] end up thinking, 'Well, if I make good music that people like, then that's alright.'" EMI was initially hesitant towards the idea; they saw the London Town track "Famous Groupies" as a potential single. McCartney ignored them. On 24 October 1977, Nick Webb mastered the British single at Abbey Road Studios, while John Golden handled the American single seven days earlier at Kendun Recorders. A radio edit was made for promotional purposes, trimming "Mull of Kintyre"'s length from 4:42 to 3:30. Having begun recording London Town as a five-piece, the McCartneys and Laine recorded the rest of the album into 1978 as a three-piece.

== Composition ==
"Mull of Kintyre" is a Scottish folk waltz and ballad. It has a conventional chorus–verse structure, along with an intro, bagpipe solos and outro. Its arrangement features guitars, bass, a small drumbeat and bagpipes. The song begins in A major before transitioning to D major for the bagpipe solos. According to music professor Vincent Benitez Jr., the song's "harmonic vocabulary" consists solely of each key's primary chords: A, D and E (A major) and D, G and A (D major). Some commentators have compared it to a campfire sing-along. Author John Blaney writes that it "recalls the romantic idealism of Sir Edwin Landseer's The Monarch of the Glen (1851) or [Robert] Burns' vernacular poetry". The song's primary theme is the beauty of the titular Mull and the peace McCartney had found there.

== Release and promotion ==
If someone thought we were only into ballads, there was the opposite to prove we do all kinds of songs. I think there may be some people who prefer the more rocking side, ['Girls' School']. So, for those people, we made it a double A, because B-sides get swallowed. B-sides never get played on the radio or anything like that, so you have to say it's a double A even if you really think it's an A and a B.

— Paul McCartney, 1977

"Mull of Kintyre" and "Girls' School" were released as a double A-side single on 11 November 1977 in the UK through Parlophone and three days later in the US through Capitol Records. (Note: Its release came two weeks after the Sex Pistols' only studio album Never Mind the Bollocks, Here's the Sex Pistols.) The single stylistically stood apart from the rising punk rock movement in the UK. In a 1977 interview with Record Mirror, McCartney explained that he was aware of punk and appreciated their style and attitude, but for him, "it's just another style". Later, in The Lyrics: 1956 to the Present (2021), he stated:

The big thought from me, and from everyone, was that it was 1977; we couldn't release the song in those days of punk. I mean, it was madness, but I just thought, 'Well, sod it.' ... The strange thing was, even the punks liked it.

To celebrate the single's release, McCartney threw a launch party on 11 November at the Dial 9 Club in Soho, London, where guests were served Scottish cuisine. The same day, McCartney was interviewed live by Capital Radio in London, followed by another with BBC Radio One the next day. On 19 November, McCartney's interview with Melody Maker's Chris Welch was published, in which he discussed "Mull of Kintyre" and London Town. On 1 December, McCartney discussed the song with Peter Sharpe on ITN News. On 10 December, Wings and the Campbeltown Pipe Band taped an appearance on the Mike Yarwood Christmas Special, which was broadcast on Christmas Day. It was watched by an estimated 22 million, about 40 percent of the British population.

=== Music video ===
Laine, Linda and Paul McCartney in the first music video for "Mull of Kintyre". It was filmed on the Kintyre peninsula near McCartney's farm.

Three music videos were made to promote "Mull of Kintyre". The first, directed by Michael Lindsay-Hogg, was filmed on 13 October 1977 at Saddell Bay on the eastern side of the Kintyre peninsula about seven miles (11 km) from High Park Farm. Paul, Linda and Denny perform the song as they overlook the bay and walk down to the beach where the Campbeltown Pipe Band marches and plays. It culminates in a bonfire singalong with extras from Campbeltown. (Note: Shortly after the video's filming, the Campbeltown Pipe Band signed a record deal with Chrysalis Records to record an album of bagpipe music at AIR Studios in London. It was funded by McCartney. The band recorded a cover of "Mull of Kintyre" at Craighall Studios in Edinburgh on 3 December 1977.)

The second video was shot on 2 December at Abbey Road Studios, where Wings were recording London Town. Directed by Paul, this video featured him, Linda and Laine miming the song while sitting next to a garden table. It also featured shots of Geoff Emerick, the McCartneys' pony Jet, a Santa Claus mannequin and a small animated segment from the unreleased Bruce McMouse Show film. Paul commissioned it to fit the song's radio edit. He grew annoyed when Top of the Pops cut the video short for the full-length song. After reviewing the footage, McCartney realised the video had nothing to do with the song's subject, so he scrapped it and commissioned a third video; the second remains unreleased.

The third video, sometimes referred to as the "Misty" version, was shot at Elstree Studios in London on 9 December. Directed by Nicholas Ferguson, this video featured Wings singing the song in a grassy area in front of boulders with mist rolling in. The Campbeltown Pipe Band enters later in the clip. It was broadcast on Top of the Pops on 15 December.

=== Commercial performance ===
Unlike the loud rock hits of the time, "Mull of Kintyre" was gentle and warm. That contrast helped it stand out. While punk bands like the Sex Pistols and disco acts filled the airwaves, McCartney's love song to Scotland quietly won over millions.

— Madz Dizon, Parade, 2026

"Mull of Kintyre" entered the UK singles chart at number 48 on 19 November. It sold 250,000 copies in the first two weeks and peaked at number one on 3 December, becoming McCartney's first UK number-one single following the breakup of the Beatles. By its fourth week, it had sold 500,000. On 17 December 1977, the single's millionth copy in the UK was sold to David Ackroyd, a Green Goddess soldier and fireman, who was presented with a gold disc of the single by Laine in a ceremony at McCartney's MPL offices in Soho, London; McCartney sent him a Christmas hamper.

"Mull of Kintyre" became a Christmas number-one single in the UK, spending nine weeks at the top of the charts. It went on to become the first single to sell over two million copies in the UK and became the UK's best-selling single of all time (eclipsing the Beatles' own "She Loves You") until overtaken by Band Aid's "Do They Know It's Christmas?" in 1984 (which also featured McCartney on the B-side). The song remains the UK's best-selling completely non-charity single, having sold 2.09 million copies. The single was a major success elsewhere. It went to number one in Australia, Austria, Belgium, Germany, Ireland, the Netherlands, New Zealand and Switzerland.

Despite its international success, "Mull of Kintyre" was not a major hit in North America, where the flipside "Girls' School" was promoted more and received more airplay and reached number 33 on the Billboard Hot 100. "Mull of Kintyre" was not a pop hit at all in the US, but did manage to reach number 45 on the Easy Listening chart. According to author Robert Rodriguez, the song's "geo-specific subject, campfire sing-along refrain, and bagpipes left American record buyers cold". McCartney blamed the poor American performance on an ineffective marketing campaign by Capitol Records. In an interview with a promotions manager of Capitol, McCartney explained that the Mull of Kintyre was "totally alien" to American listeners, attributing its poor performance to geography, its melody and not having "the same meaning" as English listeners.

In Canada, "Girls' School"/"Mull of Kintyre" was initially tracked as a double A-side, and reached number 44 on the pop charts before "Mull of Kintyre" was dropped from the chart listings on 21 January 1978. "Girls' School" continued its chart climb for a few more weeks, reaching number 34. After the single fell out of the top 40, it was once again tracked as a double A-side (with "Mull of Kintyre" getting first billing) for one week in April, but it did not beat its previous number 44 chart peak. "Mull of Kintyre" alone (without "Girls' School") did reach number 30 on Canada's Adult Contemporary chart.

=== Other releases ===
"Mull of Kintyre" and "Girls' School" were featured as bonus tracks on the 1993 CD reissue of London Town as part of The Paul McCartney Collection series. "Mull of Kintyre" has since been included on the compilation albums Wings Greatest (1978), All the Best! – UK version (1987), Wingspan: Hits and History (2001), Pure McCartney (2016) and Wings (2025). It was also featured on The 7" Singles Box in 2022.

== Critical reception ==
Despite its commercial success, "Mull of Kintyre" / "Girls School" was released to generally mixed reviews in the UK, being unfavourably compared to Rod Stewart's cover of the Sutherland Brothers' "Sailing". Charles Shaar Murray wrote a scathing review in the NME, commending the performance of the Campbelltown Pipe Band but saying the song "sucks on ice". Record Mirror's Sheila Prophet wrote that the song, featuring "Ol' flat voice", was "saved by the chorus" and the Campbelltown Pipe Band. In Melody Maker, Ian Birch wrote that "Mull of Kintyre" "lies somewhere between a traditional folk song..., a scarf-waving chant... and a late night at the boozer." Record World called it "a lovely Scottish waltz with bagpipes".

== Live performances ==
McCartney has played "Mull of Kintyre" only occasionally in concert since Wings' 1979 British tour, generally on select dates in Scotland, Canada and Australia. One performance in Glasgow, Scotland on 30 June 1990 Perasi described as "captur[ing] the anthem-like essence of the song and the enthusiasm of the audience, led by McCartney in a state of grace". In 1993, he performed it on 27 March at the Western Springs Stadium in Auckland, New Zealand, joined by the Continental Airlines Pipe Band, and again on 21 May at the Winnipeg Stadium in Winnipeg, Canada, joined by the Heatherbelles Ladies Pipe Band. Further performances in these areas occurred in 2002, 2005, 2010, 2012, 2013, 2015, 2017 and 2025. On 11 July 2009, at a concert at the Halifax Common, he played the song accompanied by the 78th Highlanders (Halifax Citadel) Pipe Band. He played the song at the O2 Arena in London on 22 December 2009, accompanied by the 18-piece Balmoral Highlanders Pipe Band.

The following year, on 20 June 2010, McCartney performed "Mull of Kintyre" at Hampden Park in Glasgow accompanied by the Pipes and Drums of Loretto School. He played the song at the Air Canada Centre in Toronto, Ontario, on 8 and 9 August 2010 with the Paris Port Dover Pipe Band. On 20 December 2011, Loretto School played with him again in the final concert of his On The Run tour at the Echo Arena in Liverpool. On 25 November 2012, McCartney performed "Mull of Kintyre" at the On The Run tour in Vancouver, British Columbia, with the Delta Police Pipe Band, and in Edmonton, Alberta with the Edmonton Police Service Pipes and Drums on 28–29 November. On 7 July 2013, McCartney performed "Mull of Kintyre" on his Out There tour to a sell-out crowd at the Canadian Tire Centre in Ottawa, Ontario, accompanied by the Ottawa Police Service Pipe Band.

On 19 and 20 April 2016, McCartney performed "Mull of Kintyre" during the One on One tour in the Rogers Arena in Vancouver, British Columbia, again with the Delta Police Pipe Band. As part of that same tour, on 2 December 2017, he played the song in Perth, Western Australia, with the Western Australian Police Force Pipe Band, in Melbourne, Victoria, 5–6 December 2017 with the Scotch College pipe band, in Brisbane Queensland on 9 December 2017 with the Brisbane Combined Pipe Band, in Sydney on 11 and 12 December with the Governor Macquarie Memorial Pipe Band and in Auckland New Zealand on 16 December 2017 with the Auckland and Districts Pipe Band.

The song's refrain was also played at Linda McCartney's funeral in June 1998.

== Legacy ==
"Mull of Kintyre" turned the Kintyre peninsula into a tourist attraction, increasing by about 20 percent, and prompted a surge of interest in bagpipes, particularly in Middle Eastern countries such as Libya, Saudi Arabia and the United Arab Emirates.

The song also found popularity in the UK as a terrace chant. Notably, a version with altered lyrics has been sung by fans of English football side Nottingham Forest since their 1978 title victory, and today is sung by supporters at the start of every home match. In 2015, McCartney said that he would be willing to perform the song live at the City Ground if Forest were promoted.

== Cover versions ==
Glen Campbell covered the song live on his 1981 album Glen Campbell Live, while a studio recording appeared on Old Home Town the following year. He played the bagpipes himself. Campbell told the Liverpool Echo in 1997 that he cried when he first heard the song. He stated: "Playing in Liverpool is a must for me – the home of the Beatles. I'll play 'Mull of Kintyre' in honour of Sir Paul. [H]e is one of the greatest songwriters in the world and Liverpool should be rightly proud of his achievements."

Co-writer Denny Laine re-recorded "Mull of Kintyre" for his 1996 album Wings at the Sound of Denny Laine.

Irish singing group and stage show Celtic Thunder performed the song in their first concert DVD Celtic Thunder: The Show. The DVD and companion CD, Act Two, were released in 2008.

Cheyenne Kimball covered the song on the album "Let Us In" Nashville – A Tribute to Linda McCartney, consisting of country-themed covers of Paul McCartney songs by various artists, released in 2011, a benefit album for the Women and Cancer Fund.

== Personnel ==
According to the author Luca Perasi:

- Paul McCartney – lead and backing vocals, acoustic guitar, bass guitar
- Linda McCartney – backing vocals
- Denny Laine – harmony and backing vocals, acoustic guitar
- Joe English – drums
- Ian Bairnson – backing vocals
- David Paton – backing vocals
- Campbeltown Pipe Band:

- Tony Wilson, Ian McKerral, David McIvor, John Lang Brown, Archie Coffield, John McGeachy, Dougie Lang – bagpipes
- Jimmy McGeachy, David Hastie, Campbell Maloney, Ian Campbell, Tommy Blue, John MacCallum, Ian MacKenzie – drums

== Charts ==
=== Weekly charts ===
Chart (1977–1978)	Peak position
Australia (Kent Music Report)	1
Austria (Ö3 Austria Top 40)	1
Belgium (Joepie)	1
Belgium (Ultratop 50 Flanders)	1
Belgium (Ultratop 50 Wallonia)	20
Canada Top Singles (RPM)	44
Canada Adult Contemporary (RPM)	30
Ireland (IRMA)	1
Japan (Oricon)	69
Netherlands (Dutch Top 40)	1
Netherlands (Single Top 100)	1
New Zealand (Recorded Music NZ)	1
Norway (VG-lista)	2
South Africa (Springbok Radio)	1
Spain (AFE)	5
Sweden (Sverigetopplistan)	14
Switzerland (Schweizer Hitparade)	1
UK Singles (Official Charts)	1
US Adult Contemporary (Billboard)	45
West Germany (GfK)	1

=== Year-end charts ===
Chart (1977)	Position
Australia (Kent Music Report)	20
Netherlands (Dutch Top 40)	96
Netherlands (Single Top 100)	90
UK Singles (OCC)	1

Chart (1978)	Position
Australia (Kent Music Report)	2
Austria (Ö3 Austria Top 40)	5
Belgium (Ultratop 50 Flanders)	16
Netherlands (Dutch Top 40)	96
Netherlands (Single Top 100)	4
New Zealand (RIANZ)	3
South Africa (Springbok Radio)	5
Switzerland (Schweizer Hitparade)	4
West Germany (Media Control)	3

== Certifications ==
Certifications for "Mull of Kintyre"
Region	Certification	Certified units/sales
Australia (ARIA)	Gold	50,000^{^}
France	—	300,000
Germany (BVMI)	Gold	500,000^{^}
Ireland (IRMA)	2× Platinum	65,000
United Kingdom (BPI)	2× Platinum	2,080,000
^{^} Shipments figures based on certification alone.
