= Cafe on the Left Bank =

"Café on the Left Bank"

Song by Wings

from the album London Town
- Released: 31 March 1978
- Recorded: 3–4 May and 25 October 1977, 1 December 1977
- Studio: Fair Carol Yacht, Virgin Islands; Abbey Road, London
- Genre: Rock
- Length: 3:25
- Label: Parlophone (UK); Capitol (US)
- Songwriter: Paul McCartney
- Producer: Paul McCartney

"Café on the Left Bank" is a song by the English rock band Wings, released as the second track on their sixth studio album London Town (1978).

== Background and composition ==
The lyrics of "Café on the Left Bank" were written by Paul McCartney on the back of a sheet of stationery in Hotel Bakoua in France, with "Café on the Left Bank" having been circled twice by McCartney, implying that it was the title of the song. The song was partially inspired by a hitchhiking trip to France Paul took with John Lennon, as Paul recalled in the book The Lyrics: 1956 to the Present:

"When John and I hitchhiked to Paris in 1961, we went to a café on the Left Bank, and the waitress was older than us – easy, since John was turning twenty-one and I was nearly twenty. She poured us two glasses of vin ordinaire, and we noticed she had hair under her arms, which was shocking: 'Oh my God, look at that; she's got hair under her arms!' The French would do that, but no British – or, as we would later learn, American – girl would be seen dead with hair under her arms. You had to be a real beatnik. It's such a clear memory for me, so it was in my head when I was setting this scene."

"Café on the Left Bank" is in the key of D minor, according to musicologist Vincent Perez Benitez. It is one of the only more musically aggressive tracks on London Town.

== Recording and production ==
On 3 March 1977, Paul McCartney hired Geoff Emerick to create a set of mixes from demos Paul had created earlier in the year. Proper recording of "Café on the Left Bank" began on 3 May on the Fair Carol Yacht, with the performers on the recording consisting of Jimmy McCulloch on guitar, Paul on bass and Joe English on drums while overdubs began the following day, with Denny Laine adding his own guitar part, Linda McCartney adding a piano, the group adding some Caribbean style percussion overdubs, and Paul adding a lead vocal up on the deck on the yacht that he later double-tracked and a Moog synthesiser, other vocals were also added that day, although it is not known as to who did the other vocals. Overdubs continued and concluded on 25 October, where Paul did another vocal take that he also double-tracked, Linda and Denny also added backing vocals, the final overdub was Paul adding a cowbell. Mixing occurred on various dates between 2 December and 4 January 1978.

== Release and reception ==
"Café on the Left Bank" was issued on London Town (1978), and sequenced as the second track on the album. CultureSonar critic Ellen Fagan called it a "bouncy earworm that goes down as easy as the beer in question.", referring to the line "English-speaking people, drinking German Beer/talking way too loud for their ears." Authors Chip Madinger and Mark Easter call it a "reasonable slice of rock". Author Bill Harry writes that "'Cafe on the Left Bank' is a straight-ahead rocker describing an evening on the town in Paris, and the guitar work on the track is simply ripping." Nick DeRiso of Ultimate Classic Rock placed it at number 24 in his ranking of the 30 best Wings songs. In a ranking of the 10 most underrated Paul McCartney songs, it was placed at number 9 by Dave Swanson, who states that "It features an almost boss-nova-like groove which, coupled with some dynamic lead guitar work, helps this rise above the sap. Where McCartney finds these amazing melodies we will never know, but he seems able to toss them off in his sleep." Paul McCartney and Ted Wilmer in Wings: The Story of a Band on the Run (2025) states that it has "verité visual snapshots". Author John Blaney states it has "has more of a buzz to it than other songs recorded there, perhaps a consequence of it being recorded before the band slipped into holiday mode."

== Personnel ==
According to Luca Perasi:

- Paul McCartney – lead and backing vocals, bass, percussion
- Linda McCartney – backing vocals, organ, percussion
- Denny Laine – backing vocals, electric guitar, percussion
- Jimmy McCulloch – electric guitar, percussion
- Joe English – drums, percussion
