= Two of Us (2000 film) =

Television film by Michael Lindsay-Hogg

- Written by: Mark Stanfield
- Directed by: Michael Lindsay-Hogg
- Starring: Aidan Quinn; Jared Harris
- Theme music composer: David Schwartz
- Country of origin: United States
- Original language: English

Production
- Producers: Robert Aaronson; Leon Falk; Deborah Ann Henderson
- Production locations: Ontario, Canada
- Cinematography: Miroslaw Baszak
- Editor: Norman Buckley
- Running time: 89 minutes
- Production companies: Aaronson/Falk Productions; Viacom Productions

Original release
- Network: VH1
- Release: February 1, 2000

Two of Us is a 2000 television drama (and the third original VH1 film) which offers a dramatized account of April 24, 1976, six years after the break-up of the Beatles and the day in which Lorne Michaels made a statement on Saturday Night Live offering the Beatles $3,000 to reunite on his program. The film premiered on VH1 on February 1, 2000.

It was directed by Michael Lindsay-Hogg (who also directed the 1970 Beatles film, Let It Be) and starred Jared Harris as John Lennon and Aidan Quinn as Paul McCartney. Beatles historian Martin Lewis served as the film's technical adviser, and the screenplay was written by "longtime Beatles fan and Beatlefest attendee" Mark Stanfield.

The title of the film comes from the 1970 Beatles song "Two of Us".

== Historical background ==
There was great public demand for a Beatles reunion during the 1970s. For example, in September 1976, American promoter Sid Bernstein, who had booked many of the Beatles' historic American appearances in 1964-1966, published a full-page ad in the New York Times publicly requesting the group to reunite and offering millions of dollars. On April 24, 1976, Saturday Night Live producer Lorne Michaels parodied such offers with an on-air announcement that he would pay the Beatles $3,000 if they would perform on his program together:

Hi, I'm Lorne Michaels, the producer of "Saturday Night". Right now, we're being seen by approximately 22 million viewers, but please allow me, if I may, to address myself to just four very special people – John, Paul, George, and Ringo – the Beatles: Lately there have been a lot of rumors to the effect that the four of you might be getting back together. That would be great. In my book, the Beatles are the best thing that ever happened to music. It goes even deeper than that – you're not just a musical group, you're a part of us. We grew up with you.

It's for this reason that I am inviting you to come on our show. Now, we've heard and read a lot about personality and legal conflicts that might prevent you guys from reuniting. That's something which is none of my business. That's a personal problem. You guys will have to handle that. But it's also been said that no one has yet to come up with enough money to satisfy you. Well, if it's money you want, there's no problem here.

The National Broadcasting Company has authorized me to offer you this check to be on our show.. [ holds up check ] ..a certified check for $3,000. Here it is right here. A check made out to you, the Beatles, for $3,000. All you have to do is sing three Beatles songs. "She loves you, yeah, yeah, yeah." That's $1,000 right there. You know the words – it'll be easy.

He joked, "you can divide [the money] up any way you want. If you want to give Ringo less that's up to you." John Lennon discussed the Saturday Night Live episode, as well as his relationship with McCartney, in a September 1980 interview for Playboy:

Paul and I were together watching that show. He was visiting us at our place in the Dakota. We were watching it and almost went down to the studio, just as a gag. We nearly got into a cab, but we were actually too tired. [...] That was a period when Paul just kept turning up at our door with a guitar. I would let him in, but finally I said to him, 'Please call before you come over. It's not 1956 and turning up at the door isn't the same anymore. You know, just give me a ring.' He was upset by that, but I didn't mean it badly. I just meant that I was taking care of a baby all day and some guy turns up at the door. [...] But, anyway, back on that night, he and Linda walked in and he and I were just sitting there, watching the show, and we went, 'Ha-ha, wouldn't it be funny if we went down?' but we didn't.

Paul McCartney also remembered the event for an interview: "[John] said, 'We should go down there. We should go down now and just do it.' It was one of those moments where we said, 'Let's not and say we did.'"

== Overview ==
Two of Us opens with the following introduction:

This fictional film is not endorsed by any person depicted herein and neither such persons nor their families, heirs or related parties have participated in the making of this film. Legend has it that in 1976 — six years after the bitter breakup of the Beatles — Paul McCartney paid a surprise visit to John Lennon at his apartment in New York City. This film makes no attempt to document what may have occurred at such a meeting. Rather, it is a work of fiction in appreciation of two blokes from Liverpool, and the gifts they gave us.

The screenplay consists of a series of long conversations between John Lennon and Paul McCartney (while their wives, as well as other Beatles, are referred to, they do not appear in the production). The discussions between Lennon and McCartney explore a number of issues including the breakup of the Beatles and the difficulties that developed between them after Lennon married Yoko Ono. According to Lindsay-Hogg, "Most of the film [consists of] two men and four walls... You can't get more intimate than that."

Critic Kevin McDonough argues that, "in less talented hands, Two of Us, like any Beatles-reenactment movie, could have been an awful exercise in bad wigs and Liverpool accents. Instead, Lindsay-Hogg and first-time screen writer Mark Stanfield have created a small masterpiece, a variation on My Dinner With Andre meets The Beatles."

=== Structure and characters ===
Critic David Bianculli likened Two of Us to a three-act play with the following structure:

Act I: "McCartney, on the New York leg of his world tour with his post-Beatles group Wings, arrives unannounced at Lennon's Dakota apartment at a time when Yoko is away; they exchange small talk and biting insults, consume some marijuana and eventually end up noodling around on the piano."

Act II: "[McCartney and Lennon] don disguises, walk through Central Park and confront a few of their fans at a quiet little restaurant."

Act III: "As the evening wears down, they watch Saturday Night Live together and, by chance, witness producer Lorne Michaels offering the Beatles a laughably low sum – $3,000 – to reunite on his show. Impulsively, they toy with the idea of speeding to Rockefeller Center to perform a few songs that very night."

Nanciann Cherry wrote that, "[Harris and Quinn] are superb, capturing accents, mannerisms, and behavior of their two famous characters. More than a fine job of imitation, Harris and Quinn get beyond the trappings of fame and show us two men, former best friends, who have gone separate ways and no longer know how to recapture that friendship."

Critic Ed Bumgardner wrote that:

This conjured-up day-in-the-life meeting between Sir Paul and Saint John, a pretentious project ripe for disaster, is actually a thoughtful, well-developed character study that shouldn't embarrass either actor or the two men they so beautifully portray [...] Lindsay-Hogg's sharp eye for detail lends credence to the storyline. The period clothes and haircuts ring true, as do the dead-on scouse accents sported by Quinn and Harris as McCartney and Lennon.

Phil Gallo wrote in his Variety review on Jan 31, 2000 that:

Their strongest interaction occurs over cappuccino and chocolate with McCartney still in disguise and Lennon willing to sit exposed. He is confronted by fans and, naturally, insults them all before heading home and venturing onto the roof of the Dakota.

Canadian-born character actor Derek Aasland played the stuttering fan sparring with John Lennon and Paul McCartney as to whether "Silly Love Songs" was worthy of #1 status in the US.

== Cast ==
- Aidan Quinn as Paul McCartney
- Jared Harris as John Lennon
- Ric Reid as TV Interviewer
- Martin Martinuzzi as Limo Driver
- Neil Foster as Concierge
- Joe Bostick as Elevator Attendant
- Jeremy Tracz as Political Activist
- Ian Ryan as Dreadlocked Man
- Scott Wickware as Officer Francis
- Robert Seelinger as Second Officer
- Louis Di Bianco as Luigi
- Derek Aasland as Young Man

== Production ==
Jim DeRogatis interviewed Lindsay-Hogg about his involvement with the film. Lindsay-Hogg stated that he became involved with the project because of the screenplay:

[The screenplay] wasn't so much about The Beatles. It was a very good script in which the agency of these two famous people and their story takes you somewhere deeper. To me, that's the nature of friendship: how we grow, how we grow up, and how things change. These boys knew each other when they were 16, and now they're 35, and they have to find a new truth. We all have our own relationships like that, whether they're matrimonial relationships or friendships.

Of the screenplay, he further stated, "Mark Stanfield is a good writer and a Beatles fan who has a lot of knowledge [...] Some of that stuff was ad-libbed by the actors because they really got into this, but Mark also wrote characters instead of stereotypes or caricatures."

In another interview, Stanfield discussed the decision to create a fictionalized account of actual people: "I didn't give it a lot of thought. Certainly, it's been done before, from Shakespeare through something like Melvin and Howard. And more recently, in films like Gods and Monsters. Shakespeare in Love, for that matter."

The film's technical advisor, Beatles historian Martin Lewis, conducted extensive research, drawing upon both his and Michael Lindsay-Hogg's personal knowledge of the band:

I spent a lot of time working on the project. I dug up hours of film, video, TV, and radio material of John and Paul—so that Aidan and Jared could immerse themselves in the characters they were portraying. Much of the material was rare. What I especially wanted to give them were tapes of John and Paul talking, when they were not "on"—but being themselves—as they obviously would be when the two of them were together, without others around. We also spent hours discussing their characters and the dynamic of their relationship [...] Aidan and Jared were incredibly hard-working. They took their work very seriously. Neither of them planned to be impersonating their characters. They wanted to capture the essence of them more than anything.

In a 2008 interview with Evi-Dance Radio (Toronto), cast member Derek Aasland said:

The project just had all the right elements. It was the script, it was so very good. The smaller roles were written with heart. The stars, the director, and the subject matter of Lennon and McCartney. Fantastic. I am not ashamed to say I fought to be involved on this as I was shooting another picture at the time. Lucky for me Michael Lindsay-Hogg was keen to have me, and so all the producers just made it work. It was a deliciously memorable shoot just listening to Michael Lindsay-Hogg tell his personal stories of the Beatles. I was really thankful to be involved on this.

=== Paul McCartney ===
To further prepare for the role of Paul McCartney, Aidan Quinn traveled to Liverpool with actor Ian Hart (who had portrayed John Lennon twice, in the 1991 film The Hours and Times, and again in the 1994 film Backbeat). While there, he visited a number of places, including McCartney's childhood home.

Quinn discussed McCartney's reaction to the film in an April 2004 interview: "Just after I finished the film, I went on holiday and Paul McCartney was staying at the same place. I met him and we became quite friendly. Later, he saw the film and fortunately he liked it. It would have been terrible if he'd hated it."

=== Soundtrack ===
The original soundtrack by David Schwartz does not include any songs by the Beatles because "the producers could not get clearance from the notoriously difficult copyright holders, a company owned by Michael Jackson." Critic Jim DeRogatis notes that, "the movie was over before it struck me that the soundtrack was devoid of any Beatles songs [...] Such is our saturation in all things Beatles-related that their actual music isn't even missed in the movie. And maybe that should tell us something about getting back to what really matters in this group's legacy."

Critic Kevin Thompson further argues:

Lauren Zalaznick, VH1's senior vice president of original programming and development, notes, 'This movie is all about two souls, arguably the most famous musicians of our time. It's not an excuse for a Beatles hit parade.' Well, VH1 tried to get the rights to some Beatles songs, but wasn't successful. The songs weren't necessary, however. On the surface, Two of Us is about a long overdue meeting between two music industry icons. Look deeper and the film is really about friendship and loss.
