= Michael Lindsay-Hogg =

British motion-picture and theatre director

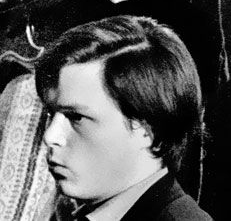
- Lindsay-Hogg in 1968
- Born: 5 May 1940 (age 86); New York City, U.S.
- Citizenship: United States, United Kingdom
- Education: Trinity School; Choate School
- Occupation: Director
- Years active: 1965–present
- Notable work: Let It Be; Brideshead Revisited; Whose Life Is It Anyway?
- Spouse: Lucy Mary Davies (m. 1967; div. 1971)
- Mother: Geraldine Fitzgerald
- Website: michaellindsay-hogg.com

Michael Edward Lindsay-Hogg (born 5 May 1940) is a British and American television, film, music video, and theatre director. Beginning his career in British television, Lindsay-Hogg became a pioneer in music film production, directing promotional films for the Beatles and the Rolling Stones. Following his work with these bands, he branched out into film and theatre, while still maintaining careers in television and music video production.

== Early life and parentage ==
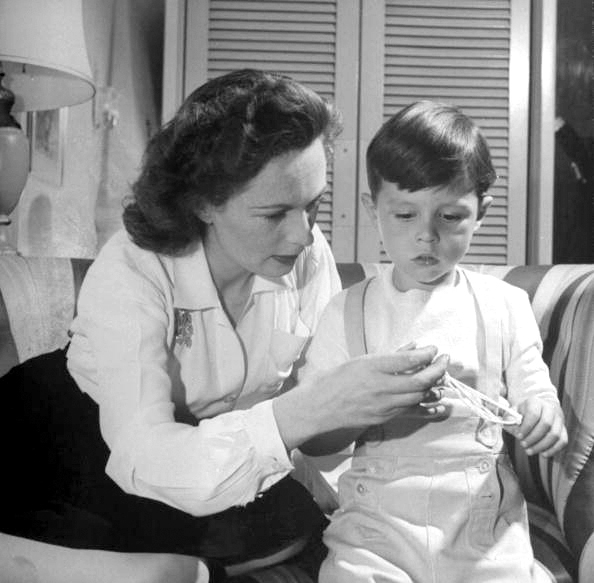
Michael as a toddler with his mother Geraldine in 1944

Michael Lindsay-Hogg was born in New York City in 1940 to actress Geraldine Fitzgerald, who was then married to Sir Edward William Lindsay-Hogg. He was educated at Trinity School in New York and at Choate School in Connecticut. For most of his early life, he understood that his father was Fitzgerald's husband, Sir Edward Lindsay-Hogg, to whom she was married until 1946. When Michael Lindsay-Hogg was 16, his mother reluctantly divulged that there had been pervasive rumours that his father was Orson Welles, and she denied them—but in such detail that he was left confused and skeptical. Fitzgerald evaded the subject for the rest of her life.

Lindsay-Hogg knew Welles, worked with him in the theatre, and met him at intervals throughout Welles's life. After he learned that Welles's oldest daughter, Chris, his childhood playmate, had long suspected that he was her brother, Lindsay-Hogg initiated a DNA test, which proved inconclusive. In his 2011 autobiography, Lindsay-Hogg reported that his questions were resolved by his mother's close friend Gloria Vanderbilt, who wrote that Fitzgerald had told her that Welles was his father. A 2015 Welles biography by Patrick McGilligan, however, argues that Welles could not be the father: Fitzgerald left the U.S. for Ireland in May 1939 and was pregnant at the time she returned in late October, while Welles did not travel overseas during that period.

Lindsay-Hogg grew up with a stepfather, American businessman Stuart Scheftel, who married Fitzgerald in 1946.

== Career ==
Lindsay-Hogg worked as producer's assistant for the film Dear Heart (1964).

In 1965, he directed episodes of the British pop programme Ready Steady Go! featuring artists such as the Rolling Stones, the Yardbirds, and The Who. In addition to these he directed episodes of Blackmail, The Informer, A Man of Our Times, Half Hour Story, and The Company of Five, a series of television plays. He served as the series director of The Ronnie Barker Playhouse in 1968. In 1969, the episode "Matakitas is Coming" that he directed of the mystery/supernatural anthology series Journey to the Unknown was released as part of a TV movie.

Through his work on Ready Steady Go!, Lindsay-Hogg became acquainted with some of the top rock artists of the day, and was subsequently hired to direct promotional films for their songs. Some of his early promo film work includes films for the Beatles' "Paperback Writer", "Rain", "Hey Jude", and "Revolution" and the Rolling Stones' "2000 Light Years from Home", "Jumpin' Jack Flash", and "Child of the Moon". His work on these and other films led Camerimage to award him a retrospective "Music Video Pioneer" award in 2012. The Rolling Stones liked his work, and he was approached in 1968 to direct a full-length television special. Lindsay-Hogg conceived The Rolling Stones Rock and Roll Circus, featuring the Stones and other musicians playing in a circus atmosphere. The band was not completely satisfied with the result, and the film did not see release until 1996.

Lindsay-Hogg was hired by the Beatles to direct a film. Originally conceived as a television special, Get Back was to feature footage of the Beatles recording a new album and rehearsing for a concert appearance. However, the film and album were shelved for a time following the Beatles' rooftop concert in January 1969. The Beatles returned to the project, and released the newly retitled Let It Be (1970) along with an album of the same name. Material originally captured for Lindsay-Hogg's 1970 documentary was used by Peter Jackson for the 2021 documentary series The Beatles: Get Back, which portrays more harmony than acrimony during those sessions.

Following Let It Be, Lindsay-Hogg continued his work in UK television, directing both episodes and TV movies, including work on the TV serial Brideshead Revisited (1981). His work on the BBC series Play for Today and Play of the Week, and the serial Brideshead Revisited were each nominated for BAFTA awards, in 1974, 1978, and 1983, respectively, with Brideshead Revisited winning for Best Drama Series/Serial. His second feature film as director, Nasty Habits (1977), is a comedy satire of the Watergate scandal. His third theatrical film, The Sound of Murder, was released in 1982.

Lindsay-Hogg continued directing music videos throughout the 1970s, including many for the Rolling Stones and Paul McCartney and Wings. In 1985, he directed the video for Whitney Houston's single "You Give Good Love". During the 1980s he returned to directing concert films, including Simon and Garfunkel's The Concert in Central Park, Neil Young's Neil Young in Berlin and Paul Simon, Graceland: The African Concert. Lindsay-Hogg's work in the 1980s also included directing TV movies of various plays and novels, including adaptations of Doctor Fischer of Geneva (1984), Master Harold...and the Boys (1985), As Is (1986), and The Little Match Girl (1987).

Lindsay-Hogg's The Object of Beauty for the BBC's Screen Two series of television films received positive reviews in 1991, and his comedy/drama for HBO, Running Mates, was broadcast in 1992. Frankie Starlight (1995), which followed, was met with mixed reception. In 1994, he directed the Roger Daltrey concert film A Celebration: The Music of Pete Townshend and The Who. The VH1 television movie entitled Two of Us (2000) is a fictionalized account of the last meeting between John Lennon and Paul McCartney. He directed a film adaptation of Samuel Beckett's absurdist play Waiting for Godot (2001).

In addition to his television and film work, Lindsay-Hogg is known for his work in theatre. He directed both the original 1978 stage production (for which he was nominated for a Tony Award) and 1980 revival of Whose Life Is It Anyway?. He also directed Broadway productions of Agnes of God (1982), and The Boys of Winter (1985). Off-Broadway, he helmed Larry Kramer's AIDS drama The Normal Heart in 1985.

Lindsay-Hogg autobiography entitled Luck and Circumstance: A Coming of Age in Hollywood, New York, and Points Beyond was published in 2011. It chronicles his career and his relationship with Orson Welles.

After a long break from television and film work, Lindsay-Hogg began directing the web series Tinsel's Town in 2015.

== Personal life ==
Lindsay-Hogg married Lucy Mary Davies in 1967; they divorced in 1971. Lucy Lindsay-Hogg subsequently became the second wife of photographer Antony Armstrong-Jones, 1st Earl of Snowdon, in 1978.

For 10 years, in the 1970s, Lindsay-Hogg was romantically involved with English actress Jean Marsh. He has also been involved with Gloria Vanderbilt, who had assured Lindsay-Hogg that Orson Welles was his father. He was also reportedly romantically linked with Mary Tyler Moore, whom he directed on Broadway in Whose Life Is It Anyway?

Lindsay-Hogg's father Sir Edward Lindsay-Hogg died in 1999 and Lindsay-Hogg was next in line to succeed to the baronetcy of Rotherfield Hall in East Sussex, but took no steps to prove his succession; the baronetcy is listed as dormant on the official roll.

== Filmography ==
- Journey to the Unknown (1968) – episode "Matakitas is Coming"
- Let It Be (1970)
- A.D.A.M. (1973) – TV movie
- A Touch of Eastern Promise (1973) – TV movie
- Occupations (1974) – TV movie
- Nasty Habits (1977)
- Professional Foul (1977) – TV play
- Brideshead Revisited (1981) – TV serial
- The Concert in Central Park (1982) – TV movie
- The Sound of Murder (1982)
- Neil Young in Berlin (1983)
- Dr. Fischer of Geneva (1985) – TV movie
- Master Harold...and the Boys (1985) – TV movie
- As Is (1986) – TV movie
- Nazi Hunter: The Beate Klarsfeld Story (1986) – TV movie
- The Little Match Girl (1987) – TV movie
- Paul Simon, Graceland: The African Concert (1987) – TV movie
- Murder by Moonlight (1989) – TV movie
- Nightmare Classics (1989) – TV movie ("The Strange Case of Dr. Jekyll and Mr. Hyde")
- The Object of Beauty (1991)
- The Habitation of Dragons (1992) – TV movie
- Running Mates (1992) – TV movie
- A Celebration: The Music of Pete Townshend and The Who (1994)
- Frankie Starlight (1995)
- Ivana Trump's For Love Alone (1996) – TV movie
- The Rolling Stones Rock and Roll Circus (1996)
- Guy (1997)
- Alone (1997) – TV movie
- Two of Us (2000) – TV movie
- Waiting for Godot (2001)

Music videos

- The Beatles – "Paperback Writer" (1966)
- The Beatles – "Rain" (1966)
- The Rolling Stones – "2000 Light Years from Home" (1967)
- The Rolling Stones – "Jumpin' Jack Flash" (1968) Two versions aesthetic of same song.
- The Rolling Stones – "Child of the Moon" (1968)
- The Beatles – "Hey Jude" (1968)
- The Beatles – "Revolution" (1968)
- Silver Metre – "Country Comforts" (1970)
- The Rolling Stones – "Angie" (1973)
- The Rolling Stones – "Doo Doo Doo Doo Doo (Heartbreaker)" (1973)
- The Rolling Stones – "Silver Train" (1973)
- The Rolling Stones – "Dancing with Mr. D" (1973)
- Wings – "Helen Wheels" (1973)
- The Rolling Stones – "It's Only Rock 'n Roll (But I Like It)" (1974)
- The Rolling Stones – "Ain't Too Proud to Beg" (1974)
- The Rolling Stones – "Till the Next Goodbye" (1974)
- The Rolling Stones – "Fool to Cry" (1976)
- The Rolling Stones – "Crazy Mama" (1976)
- The Rolling Stones – "Hey Negrita" (1976)
- The Rolling Stones – "Hot Stuff" (1976)
- Wings – "Mull of Kintyre" (1977)
- Wings – "With a Little Luck" (1978)
- Elton John – "Ego" (1978)
- The Rolling Stones – "Miss You" (1978)
- The Rolling Stones – "Far Away Eyes" (1978)
- Wings – "London Town" (1978)
- The Rolling Stones – "Respectable" (1978)
- The Rolling Stones – "Start Me Up" (1981)
- The Rolling Stones – "Worried About You" (1981)
- The Rolling Stones – "Neighbours" (1981)
- The Rolling Stones – "Waiting on a Friend" (1981)
- The Rolling Stones – "Hang Fire" (1982)
- Whitney Houston – "You Give Good Love" (1985)

Baronetage of the United Kingdom
Preceded by Edward William Lindsay-Hogg	Baronet (of Rotherfield Hall); 1999–present	Incumbent
