= Running Mates (1992 film) =

1992 American television film

- Genre: Comedy; Romance
- Written by: Carole Eastman
- Directed by: Michael Lindsay-Hogg
- Starring: Diane Keaton; Ed Harris; Ed Begley Jr. Ben Masters
- Music by: Peter Rodgers Melnick
- Country of origin: United States
- Original language: English

Production
- Producers: James D. Brubaker; Marvin Worth
- Cinematography: Jeffrey Jur
- Editor: Claudia Finkle
- Running time: 92 minutes
- Production company: HBO Pictures

Original release
- Network: HBO
- Release: October 4, 1992

Running Mates is a 1992 American political comedy/drama television film directed by Michael Lindsay-Hogg and starring Diane Keaton, Ed Harris, Ed Begley Jr., and Ben Masters. The film follows the presidential election campaign of Senator Hugh Hathaway, who faces scandal and controversy when his enemies share secrets of Aggie Snow, the woman he is with.

== Premise ==
Running for President, Senator Hugh Hathaway must go up against scandal and controversy after the woman he loves comes under political attack.

== Cast ==
- Diane Keaton as Aggie Snow
- Ed Harris as Senator Hugh Hathaway
- Ed Begley Jr. as Chapman Snow
- Ben Masters as Mel Fletcher

== See also ==
- Cinema of the United States
- List of American films of 1992
