= Don't Let It Bring You Down (Wings song) =

1977 song by Wings

Song by Wings

from the album London Town
- Released: 31 March 1978
- Recorded: May 1977
- Studio: Record Plant Mobile Studio, Fair Carol yacht, Virgin Islands
- Length: 4:34
- Label: Parlophone (UK); Capitol (US)
- Songwriters: Paul McCartney; Denny Laine
- Producer: Paul McCartney

"Don't Let It Bring You Down" is a song written by Paul McCartney and Denny Laine, and released on Wings's 1978 studio album London Town.

== Background ==
"Don't Let It Bring You Down" was written by Paul McCartney and Denny Laine and is about not getting down on life's low points. It was written on tour in Scotland in 1975, as Paul McCartney stated; "I think we were in Aberdeen, sitting in our hotel bedroom, Just before we were going to turn in for the night, and I had my 12-string guitar with me. I started plonking out a little tune and it became 'Don't Let It Bring You Down".

The song was recorded in the Virgin Islands on the yacht Fair Carol during sessions between 22 and 27 May 1977. Mixing and overdubbing was done at Abbey Road Studios during November 1977. Overdubs included backing vocals by Laine and Paul and Linda McCartney and Paul McCartney also added an electric guitar part and Paul McCartney and Laine added flageolets. Overdubbing was completed in January 1978.

== Music and lyrics ==
The song is in the key of D minor and in a 3/4 time signature. During the chorus, the melody jumps by a major sixth between the words "bring" and "you", and then falls a minor third from the word "you" to the word "down".

The lyrics have the singer mouring for the past. In a review for AllMusic, Donald A. Guarisco states that "The lyrics of the song take on a philosophical tone as they advise against getting down about life’s low points: 'Don't go down, don't go underground/Things seem strange but they change/Oh, they change/Up and down your carousel will go/Don't let it bring you down.' McCartney wraps this lyric in a gentle, syncopated melody that presents its folk-ish hooks at a slow stately pace reminiscent of a waltz played at half-speed."

== Release and reception ==
"Don't Let It Bring You Down" Was originally issued on Wings's sixth album London Town, and its subsequent reissues. In 2016, it was included the four disc deluxe edition reissue of the Pure McCartney compilation. In a review for London Town for Rolling Stone, Janet Maslin notes that it has a "minor mean streak, one that spices up the Wheatena with a welcome note of discord." CultureSonar critic Ellen Fagan states "another ode to keeping the faith but filtered through a voice of pain [that] is well-crafted but filled with heaviosity". Guarisco called it a "highlight" of the album and a "solid example of a McCartney ballad."

The Sun critic John Bialas criticised "McCartney's uninspired voice and dreadful lyrics." Ventura County Star critic Matt Aragorn Pavin called it a song "whose words are overly cliched and whose melody is insufficiently arresting to overcome the lack of dynamics." The Michigan Daily critic Owen Gleiberman calls it an "uncharacteristic solemn ballad with an understated 6/8 rhythm that flows along unburdened as it delivers its quietly optimistic message."

== Personnel ==
According to The Paul McCartney Project:

- Paul McCartney – acoustic guitar, backing vocals, bass, electric guitar, Irish tin whistle, vocals
- Linda McCartney – backing vocals
- Denny Laine – acoustic guitar, backing vocals, Irish tin whistle
- Jimmy McCulloch – possible acoustic guitar
- Joe English – brushes, drums
