= Famous Groupies =

Song by Wings

from the album London Town
- Released: 31 March 1978
- Recorded: 13 May 1977
- Length: 3:34
- Label: Parlophone (UK); Capitol (US)
- Songwriter: P. McCartney
- Producer: P. McCartney

"Famous Groupies" is a song by the English rock band Wings, released on the band's sixth studio album album London Town in 1978. Since its release it has been seen as one of the band's most iconic but lesser-known tracks.

== Background ==
The track was primarily recorded on 13 May 1977, with overdubs recorded in November 1977.

== Music and lyrics ==
McCartney revealed the lyrics were a joking song about the music business, stating that "There's a famous pair of groupies from years ago called the Plaster Casters. It's not really modelled on them but it's that kind of idea: a couple of groupies who go around together, are notorious and stuff. No, I don't get groupies. No, I hope I don't anyway. There comes a stage when you sort of let it be known that you don't want them, then they don't show up anymore. You've got to be single and out on the road. I'm a married man with four kids now, so I can't do all that. I'm not like that!" John Blaney wrote that it "relates the tale of various fictitious musicians and roadies, not to mention groupies, and their exploits." Damian Fanelli notes that "McCartney goes into storytelling mode to recount the tale of a fictional pair of groupies who do some pretty horrible things to the music-biz gents they supposedly adore".

== Release and reception ==
Gavin Edwards writes that "The way the song gets its passport stamped for Bizarroland is the monologue at the end". Janet Maslin criticised the track in a Rolling Stone review as a "dry, slightly bitchy song indicating that idle chatter [that] Linda McCartney still gets the family's goat." Donald A. Guarisco likens it in an AllMusic review to music from the Monty Python movie, noting that "The music applies a mock serious, folk-styled melody to the song, a combination of a regal chorus and relentlessly ascending verses, that enhances its humor by pushing it forward in a rapid, melodramatic sing-along style", concluding that "McCartney caps the song with a delightfully tongue-in-cheek vocal that incorporates everything from yodeling to mock-Cockney announcements. It all adds up to a genially goofy bit of fun that shows off the playful side of Paul McCartney's songwriting."

== Personnel ==
According to The Paul McCartney Project, except where noted:

- Paul McCartney – acoustic guitar (?), bass, electric guitar (?), percussion, slide guitar (?), vocals
- Linda McCartney – background vocals, Mellotron
- Denny Laine – acoustic guitar (?), backing vocals, electric guitar (?)
- Jimmy McCulloch – electric guitar, slide guitar (?)
- Joe English – drums
