= London Town (Wings song) =

- Spanish picture sleeve

Single by Wings

from the album London Town
- B-side: "I'm Carrying"
- Released: 25 August 1978
- Recorded: 14 February 1977
- Studio: Abbey Road Studios
- Genre: Soft rock
- Length: 4:10
- Label: Parlophone / EMI (UK); Capitol (US)
- Songwriters: Paul McCartney; Denny Laine
- Producer: Paul McCartney

Wings singles chronology
"I've Had Enough" (1978)	"London Town" (1978)	"Goodnight Tonight" (1979)

Alternate cover
- German picture sleeve

"London Town" is a song by the British-American rock band Wings. The title and opening track of their 1978 album London Town, it was the third of three single releases from the album, reaching No. 39 in the US, No. 43 in Canada and No. 60 in the UK. It also reached No. 17 on the Billboard Easy Listening chart in the US.

== Writing and recording ==
Paul McCartney and Denny Laine began writing "London Town" in Perth, Australia, in late 1975 during the Wings Over the World tour, but they completed it later in Scotland. The recording features a lead vocal by Paul McCartney and backing vocals by Linda McCartney and Laine. It was one of the first songs recorded for the London Town album, prior to the departures of Joe English and Jimmy McCulloch, who play drums and guitar, respectively, on the track. Laine also plays guitar, Paul McCartney plays bass guitar and Linda McCartney plays keyboards.

== Lyrics and music ==
The lyrics of "London Town" describe "ordinary people" and everyday life in London. According to Beatles biographer John Blaney, it "presents a romanticized view of London; part reportage and part fantasy." Blaney elaborates that it combines "idealisation with acute observations of everyday street life." Music professor Vincent Benitez compared the effect of "quixotic" presentation of the people of London with that of the McCartney penned Beatle song "Penny Lane." Benitez noted a theme of loneliness throughout the lyrics, as the singer feels alienated from the Londoners he describes. Muzikalia critic Txus Iglesias also compared the theme with "Penny Lane", saying that while "Penny Lane" describes the characters of that locale affectionately and colorfully, "London Town" describes the monotony of the lives of some Londoners.

"London Town" is a soft rock song in the key of E major. The introduction to the song obscures the tonic by beginning phrases in different keys, but the key of E major is established at the end of the introduction and is then used to begin the first verse. The fourth and final verse is also based on the key of E major but the middle two verses begin and end on the key of A major, which is the subdominant of E major. Benitez notes that besides using the same key, verses 1 and 4 are also linked in that they describe the singer meeting colorful Londoners and they end with the phrase "Silver rain was falling down/Upon the dirty ground of London Town." Besides sharing a key, verses 2 and 3 share a more pessimistic viewpoint—the singer's frustration at his inability meet ordinary people and the emptiness felt by an unemployed actor. These two middle verses also end with the phrase "Well, I don't know."

The two bridges and the outro are also in A major. Benitez interprets the tension between the keys of E major and A major throughout the song as representing the "uncertainty felt by the protagonist, who is unsure about where to go in London."

== Critical reception ==
Chris Ingham praised "London Town" as one of the best tracks on the album, stating that it was "full of the most sensitive pop synthesizer touches". Billboard described it as a "melodic, atmosphere ballad" and particularly praised McCartney's vocal. Cash Box said it showed McCartney's "rare ability to combine simple elements and achieve intriguing results" and that the "well-timed pauses give the record an 'open' feel." Record World said that the song is "in the 'Penny Lane' tradition, with an attractive, light melody played and sung in a quiet but highly effective way."

McCartney biographer Peter Ames Carlin called it "a pleasantly spaced-out perspective on city life". Tom Waseleski of the Beaver County Times recognised the song as having "more substance" than other of McCartney's soft rock tracks. Henry McNulty of the Hartford Courant praised it for its "fine, clear harmonies" and "sprightly, inventive melody," recognizing it as one of the few decent songs on the album (along with the other two singles). Tim Riley calls it "willfully sulky". Beatles biographers Roy Carr and Tony Tyler regard "London Town" as an "anachronism", with several Beatle-esque touches, including opening chords that sound like "Blackbird" and a chord progression similar to that in "The Fool on the Hill". Paul Sexton of udiscovermusic.com described it as a "laid-back, beautifully-harmonised and reflective piece about the British capital." Iglesias rated it as the Wings' 11th best song.

== Other releases ==
"London Town" was featured on The 7" Singles Box in 2022 and on the deluxe edition of Wings in 2025.

== Personnel ==
According to the author Luca Perasi:

- Paul McCartney – lead and backing vocals, bass, electric and acoustic guitar, piano, synthesiser
- Linda McCartney – backing vocals, synthesiser
- Denny Laine – backing vocals, acoustic guitar, electric piano, synthesiser
- Jimmy McCulloch – electric guitar, slide guitar
- Joe English – drums

== Weekly charts ==
Chart (1978)	Peak position
UK	60
Canada	43
US Billboard Hot 100	39
US Easy Listening	17
