= I've Had Enough (Wings song) =

Single by Wings

from the album London Town
- B-side: "Deliver Your Children"
- Released: 16 June 1978
- Recorded: 5 May 1977, 25 October – 1 December 1977
- Studio: Record Plant Mobile Studio, Fair Carol Yacht, Virgin Islands; Abbey Road, London
- Genre: Rock
- Length: 3:04
- Label: Parlophone/EMI (UK); Capitol (US)
- Songwriter: Paul McCartney
- Producer: Paul McCartney

Wings singles chronology
"With a Little Luck" (1978)	"I've Had Enough" (1978)	"London Town" (1978)

"I've Had Enough" is a song by the British–American rock band Wings, released as a single from their 1978 album London Town. It reached No. 25 on the Billboard Hot 100 chart, No. 24 in Canada and No. 42 in the UK as well as reached No. 11 in Ireland. In the Netherlands, the 2-sided single "I've Had Enough" combined with its B-side "Deliver Your Children" reached No. 13.

== Writing and recording ==
"I've Had Enough" was written and sung by Paul McCartney. The music and an improvised chorus were recorded on board the boat Fair Carol in the Virgin Islands prior to the departure of Wings' lead guitarist Jimmy McCulloch and drummer Joe English. According to McCartney, they did not have any of the words until the band returned to London from the Fair Carol recording sessions. He then wrote "a few" words and overdubbed the lyrics in London.

== Lyrics and music ==
The lyrics of "I've Had Enough" primarily vent the singer's frustration in the face of various circumstances. McCartney referred to it as "just one of those 'fed up' songs." Wings' label Capitol Records described it as "a driving rock 'n' roll tune that lyrically describes an artist's ultimatum to the taxman, a self-serving manager, or both." Syndicated columnist Joel McNally regarded the song as containing political commentary.

The song is in the key of D major. Music professor Vincent Benitez describes the song as a musically simple "guitar-dominated rocker," with alternating verses and chorus following the introductory section. According to McNally, "it is done in the rock styles of the '50s, '60s and '70s. All at the same time." Billboard found the song structure to be similar to early songs McCartney wrote for the Beatles.

== Reception ==
Rolling Stone critic Janet Maslin claimed that "I've Had Enough" hints "at a minor mean streak, which "spices up" the London Town album "with a welcome note of discord." McCartney biographer Peter A. Carlin claimed the song reflects "the righteous outrage of a man who can't find his slippers." Tom Waseleski of Beaver County Times praised McCartney's "raspy, boyish vocal" as a throwback to his early days with the Beatles. Author Tim Riley calls it a "simplistic screamer." Beatles' biographer John Blaney claims that it is "not very effective," despite "a half decent riff and a snappy arrangement," and suggests that the "negative" chorus may reflect McCartney's dissatisfaction with the band at the time.

On the other hand Kingsport Times-News critic Michael Clark regarded "I've Had Enough" to be the best song on London Town, calling it "guitar-riff oriented in Paul's best Beatle tradition" and stating that the lyrics evoke "Get Back" and similar Beatle songs "without drawing specifically from the same sources." Muzikalia critic Txus Iglesias rated it to be Wings' 6th best song, praising its power and rawness. Billboard suggested that "McCartney's growling vocal and an insistent beat" make the song "a decisive statement in release of pent-up frustrations." Cash Box suggested that it could follow "With a Little Luck" to the top of the charts and called it "a jaunty, shuffle-rocker," saying "the tune rides a crisp handclap beat and simple guitar chording." Record World said that "McCartney in top pop vocal form" and that "the back beat is strong and the hook instantly singable." In 2013, Rolling Stone rated it the #35 all-time Paul McCartney post-Beatles song, describing how it contrasted with Wings' prior single, the "easygoing" "With a Little Luck" with "tough talk and guitars to match." In that review, Rolling Stone suggested that the song's "sarcastic snarl" was influenced by Elvis Costello. McCartney biographer Martin A. Grove, writing at about the time the single was released described "I Had Enough" as a "hard–rocking" song, which he (as it turned out over-optimistically) predicted may become a No. 1 hit.

The song was featured on The 7" Singles Box in 2022.

== Personnel ==
According to author Luca Perasi:

- Paul McCartney – vocals, bass, electric guitar, possible tambourine
- Linda McCartney – keyboards, possible tambourine
- Denny Laine – electric guitar
- Jimmy McCulloch – electric guitar
- Joe English – drums

== Weekly charts ==
Chart (1978)	Peak position
Canada RPM Singles	24
Irish Singles Chart	11
Netherlands	13
UK singles chart	42
US Billboard Hot 100	25
