= With a Little Luck =

Single by Wings

from the album London Town
- B-side: "Backwards Traveller"/"Cuff Link"
- Released: 17 March 1978
- Recorded: 10 May – November 1977
- Studio: Record Plant Mobile Studio, Fair Carol Yacht, Virgin Islands; Abbey Road, London
- Genre: Synth-pop; yacht rock
- Length: 5:45 (full-length version); 3:13 (radio edit version)
- Label: Parlophone (UK); Capitol (US)
- Songwriter: Paul McCartney
- Producer: Paul McCartney

Wings singles chronology
"Mull of Kintyre" (1977)	"With a Little Luck" (1978)	"I've Had Enough" (1978)

"With a Little Luck" is a single by the band Wings from their 1978 album London Town. It reached number 1 on the Billboard Hot 100 chart in May 1978.

== Writing, recording and release ==
"With a Little Luck" was written in Scotland and was Wings' follow-up single to the then best-selling UK single of all time, "Mull of Kintyre." It was recorded in May 1977 in the Virgin Islands aboard the boat Fair Carol, which had been fitted with a 24-track studio, for the album London Town. The album, which had the working title Water Wings was released in March 1978 as the band's seventh album. During these recordings, Wings' lead guitarist Jimmy McCulloch and drummer Joe English had recorded tracks but had left, returning the band to the three-piece line-up which had recorded Band on the Run in 1973. McCartney played electric piano, bass and synthesiser in the song; English was likely on drums, while Denny Laine and Linda McCartney helped with some keyboards.

"With a Little Luck" was released on 17 March 1978 in the US and a week later on 24 March in the UK as the first single from the album and reached No. 1 in the United States and Canada, and No. 5 in the UK. While it was at the top of the charts in the US, McCartney announced the new Wings line-up featuring lead guitarist Laurence Juber and drummer Steve Holley.

The single's b-side consists of the segue of two short tracks, "Backward Traveller"/"Cuff Link", also on the album, the first of which is a song and the second an instrumental that features a heavily synthesised guitar theme.

== Reception ==
Billboard described "With a Little Luck" as an "optimistic and celebrative" midtempo pop song that it expected to be one of McCartney's most commercially successful songs. Cash Box said that "the lead vocals and harmonies are smooth and soothing" and praised the hooks. Record World called it "a light, whimsical song about life's mysteries." Chris Ingham praised the song as one of the best on the album, stating it was "full of the most sensitive pop synthesizer touches." Tom Waseleski of the Beaver County Times regarded "With a Little Luck" as having "more substance" than McCartney's other soft rock tracks.

== Music video ==
The song's music video, directed by Michael Lindsay-Hogg, aired in the UK on 9 May 1978, as part of Granada Television's Paul, a music show hosted by Paul Nicholas.

== Personnel ==
- Paul McCartney – vocals, bass guitar, synthesizer, keyboards
- Linda McCartney – keyboards, backing vocals
- Denny Laine – keyboards, backing vocals
- Joe English – drums

== Charts ==
=== Weekly charts ===
Chart (1978)	Peak position
Austria	11
Australia (Kent Music Report)	11
Canada RPM Top Singles	1
Canada RPM Adult Contemporary	4
Germany	17
Ireland	3
New Zealand	3
Norway	6
UK	5
US Billboard Hot 100	1
US Billboard Adult Contemporary	5
US Cash Box Top 100	1

=== Year-end charts ===
Chart (1978)	Rank
Australia (Kent Music Report)	86
Canada	23
UK	84
US Billboard Hot 100	18
US Cash Box Top 100	32

== Later releases ==
"With a Little Luck" was released as two versions: the full-length version, which runs 5:45, and a promotional radio edit version, which runs 3:13 (as it cuts out, among other things, the entire instrumental interlude). The full-length version is included on Wings Greatest (1978), the UK & Canada version of All the Best! (1987) and the deluxe edition of Wings (2025), while the radio edit version appears on the US version of All the Best!, Wingspan: Hits and History (2001), Pure McCartney (2016), The 7" Singles Box (2022) and the single-disc edition of Wings.

The song was featured in the closing credits of the 1979 film Sunburn starring Farrah Fawcett, Charles Grodin and Art Carney.
