= A-side and B-side =

Two sides of phonograph records and cassettes

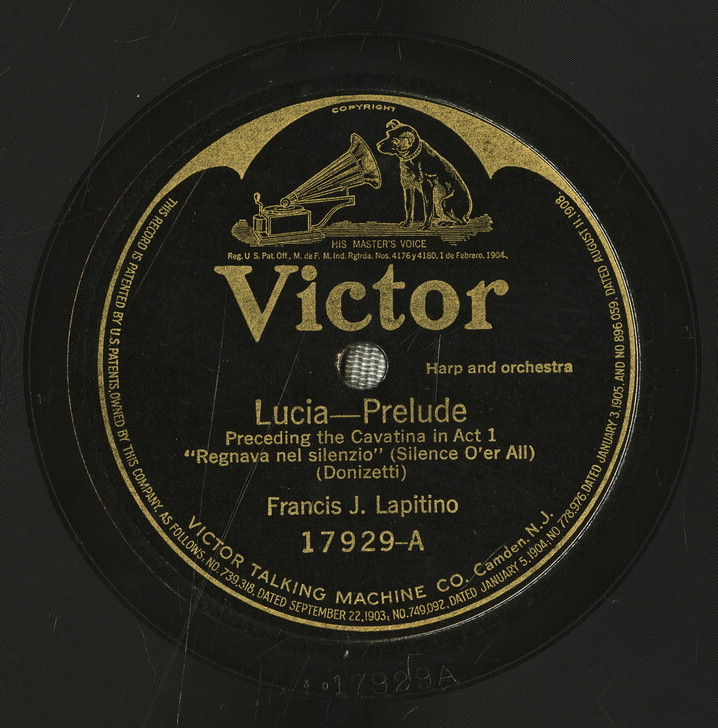
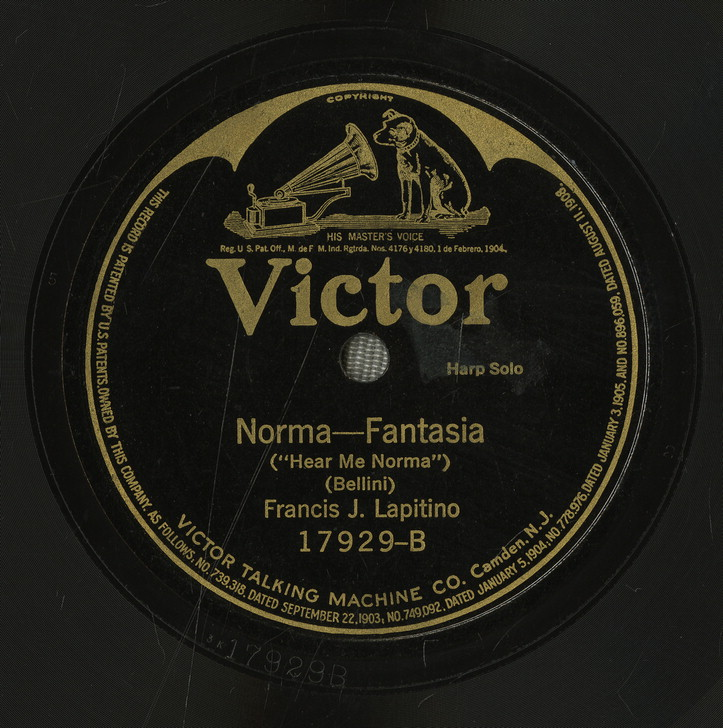
Victor 17929-A and 17929-B

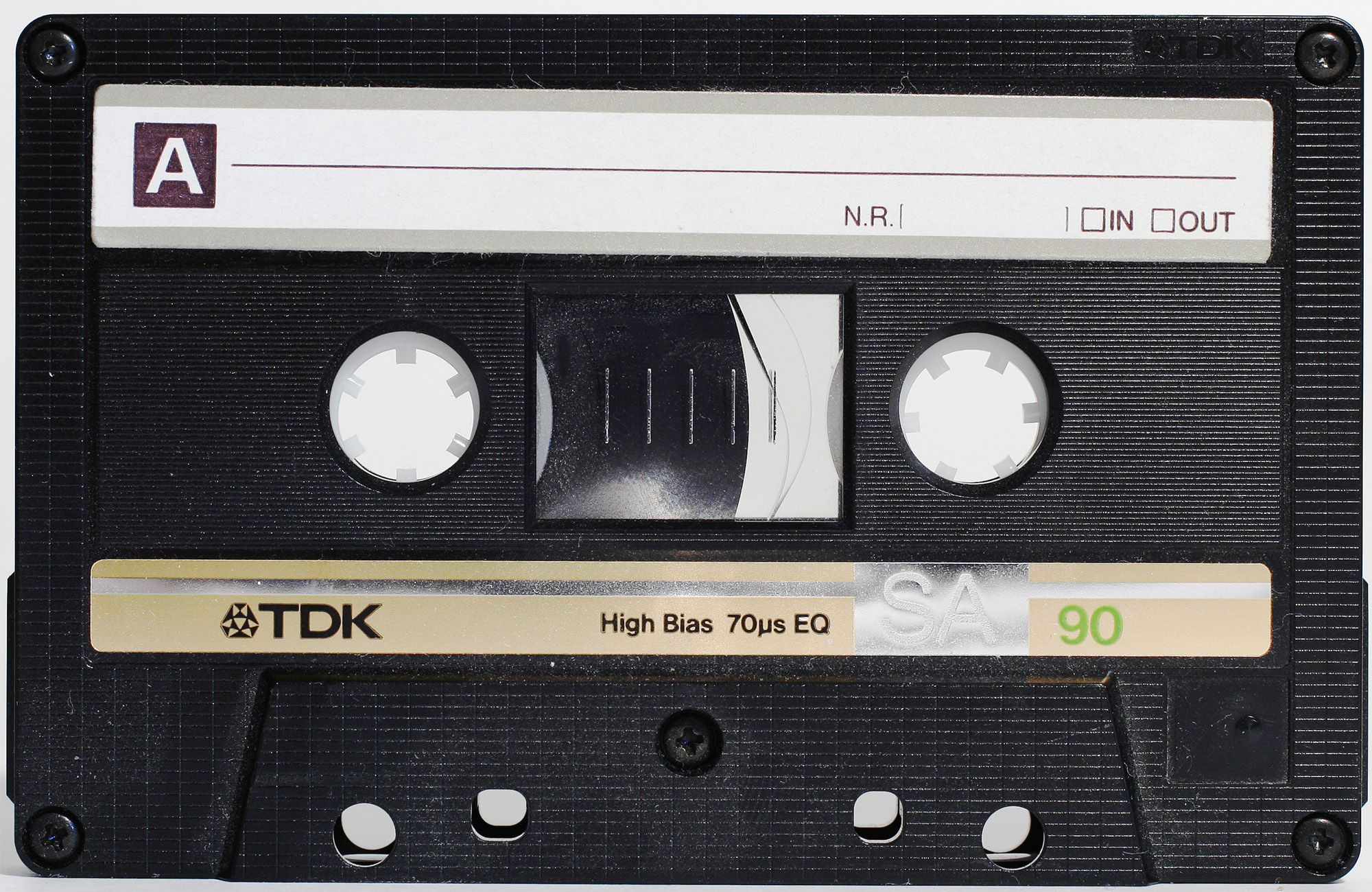
A cassette tape

The A-side and B-side are the two sides of vinyl records and cassettes, and the terms have often been printed on the labels of two-sided music recordings, which in purely technical terms of recording and playback do not favor any side over the other. The A-side of a single usually features a recording that its artist, producer, or record company intends to be the initial focus of promotional efforts and radio airplay, with the aim of it becoming a hit record. The B-side (or "flip-side") is a secondary recording that typically receives less attention, although some B-sides have been as successful as, or more so than, their A-sides.

== History ==
Conventions shifted in the early 1960s, at which point record companies started assigning the song they wanted radio stations to play to side A, as 45 rpm single records ("45s") dominated most markets in terms of cash sales in comparison to albums, which did not fare as well financially. Throughout the decade the industry would slowly shift to an album-driven paradigm for releasing new music; it was not until 1968 that the total production of albums on a unit basis finally surpassed that of singles in the United Kingdom.

Today, with the vast majority of music released and accessed without any physical carrier and predominantly as separate works, the traditional A-side/B-side distinction is obsolete. Nonetheless, some contemporary artists have added on a second track to a single-track release as a metaphorical "B-side" or "bonus track", which can serve as an aesthetic choice as well as a promotional tool.

== Double A-side ==
A double A-side, AA-side, or dual single is a single where both sides are designated the A-side, with no designated B-side; that is, both sides are prospective hit songs and neither side will be promoted over the other. In 1949, Savoy Records promoted a new pair of singles by one of its artists, Paul Williams' "House Rocker" and "He Knows How to Hucklebuck", as "The New Double Side Hit – Both Sides 'A' Sides". In 1965, Billboard reported that due to a disagreement between EMI and John Lennon about which side of the Beatles' "We Can Work It Out" and "Day Tripper" single should be considered the A-side and receive the plugging, "EMI settled for a double-side promotion campaign—unique in Britain."

In the UK, before the advent of digital downloads, both A-sides were accredited with the same chart position, for the singles chart was compiled entirely from physical sales. In the UK, the biggest-selling non-charity single of all time was a double A-side, Wings' 1977 release "Mull of Kintyre"/"Girls' School", which sold over two million copies. It was also the UK Christmas No. 1 that year. Nirvana released "All Apologies" and "Rape Me" as a double A-side in 1993, and both songs are accredited as a hit on both the UK Singles Chart and the Irish Singles Chart.

== B/W ==
The term "b/w", an abbreviation of "backed with", is often used in listings to indicate the B-side of a record. The term "c/w", for "coupled with", is used similarly.

== Characteristics ==
B-sides are often considered to be filler material: songs of lower quality. However, pop artists such as Prince, New Order, Pet Shop Boys, Def Leppard, the Cure, Tori Amos, Bon Jovi, Oasis, and the Beatles have been particularly known for releasing strong material on B-sides. B-sides have often been compiled on expanded or "deluxe" editions of albums or may be compiled into a B-side compilation album across multiple periods of an artist's career.

== See also ==
- B movie

== Notes ==
=== References ===
- MacDonald, Ian. Revolution in the Head: The Beatles' Records and the Sixties – ISBN 1-84413-828-3
- "A History of the 45rpm record" Martland, Peter. EMI: The First 100 Years – ISBN 0-7134-6207-8
