= Paul McCartney =

English musician and songwriter (born 1942)

Sir Paul McCartney CH MBE
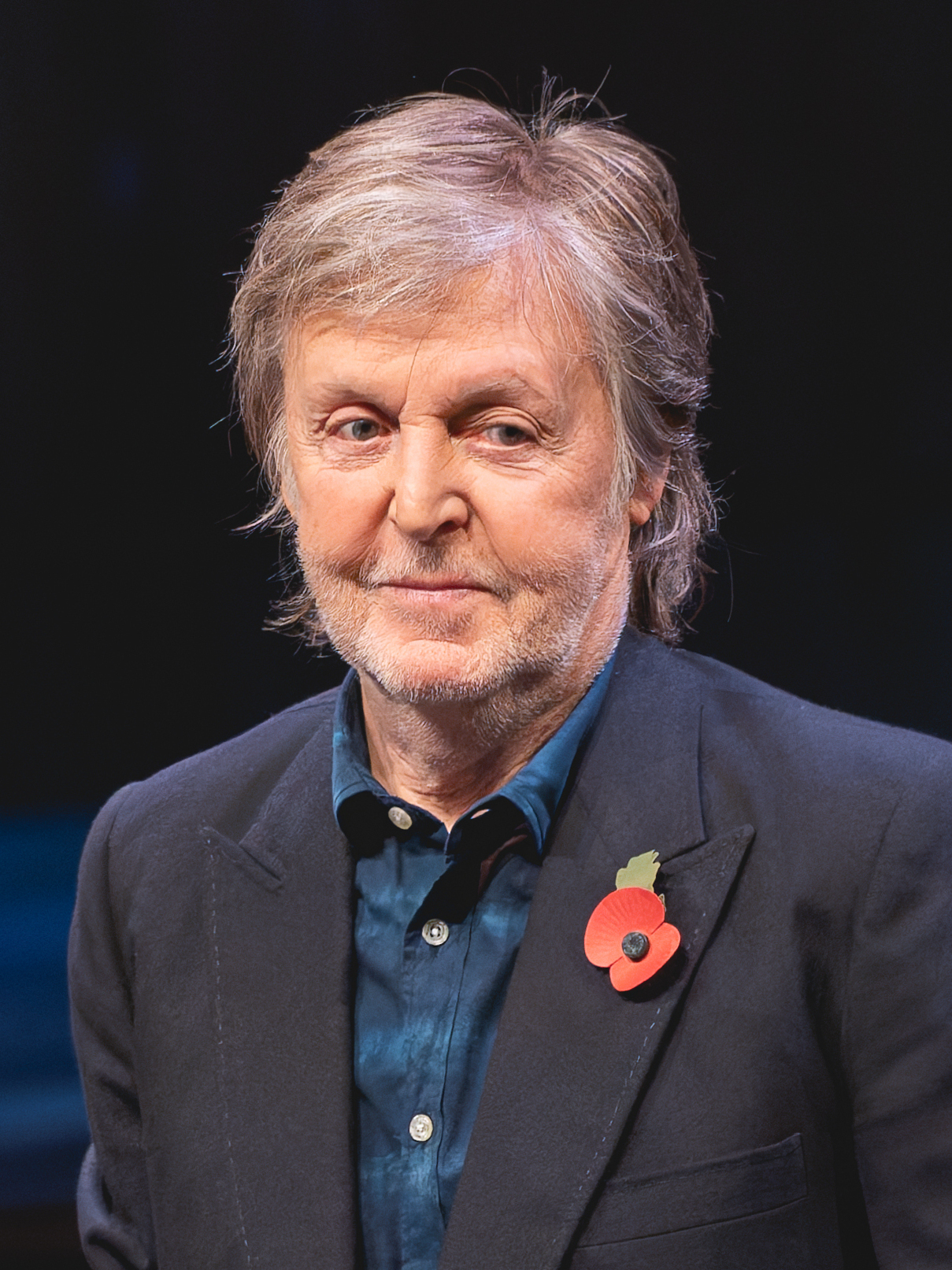
- McCartney in 2021
- Born: James Paul McCartney; 18 June 1942 (age 84); Liverpool, England
- Other names: Macca; Bernard Webb; The Fireman; Apollo C. Vermouth; Percy "Thrills" Thrillington
- Occupations: Singer; songwriter; musician; record and film producer; businessman
- Years active: 1957–present
- Spouses: Linda Eastman (m. 1969; died 1998); Heather Mills (m. 2002; div. 2008); Nancy Shevell (m. 2011)
- Children: 5, including Mary, Stella and James
- Relatives: Mike McCartney (brother)
- Awards: Full list
- Musical career
- Genres: Rock; pop; classical; electronic
- Instruments: Vocals; bass guitar; guitar; keyboards; drums; piano
- Works: Discography; songs; musical contributions; videography; concert tours
- Labels: Apple; Capitol; Columbia; Decca; Hear Music; Parlophone; Polydor; Swan; Vee-Jay
- Member of: Paul McCartney Band
- Formerly of: The Quarrymen; The Beatles; Wings; The Fireman; Sound City Players
- Paul McCartney's voice from the BBC programme Front Row, 26 December 2012
- Website: paulmccartney.com

Sir James Paul McCartney (born 18 June 1942) is an English musician and songwriter. He gained global fame with the Beatles, for whom he was the bassist and keyboardist, and shared primary songwriting and lead vocal duties with John Lennon. McCartney is known for his melodic bass-playing, versatile tenor vocal range and musical eclecticism, exploring genres ranging from traditional pop to classical, ballads and electronica. His songwriting partnership with Lennon remains the most successful in music history.

Born in Liverpool, McCartney taught himself piano, guitar, and songwriting as a teenager, having been influenced by his father, a jazz player, and rock and roll performers such as Little Richard and Buddy Holly. He began his career when he joined Lennon's skiffle group, the Quarrymen, in 1957, which evolved into the Beatles in 1960. Sometimes called "the cute Beatle", McCartney later immersed himself in the London avant-garde scene and played a key role in incorporating experimental aesthetics into the Beatles' studio productions. Starting with their eighth studio album Sgt. Pepper's Lonely Hearts Club Band (1967), he gradually became the band's de facto leader, providing creative impetus for most of their music and film projects. Many of his Beatles songs, including "And I Love Her", "Yesterday", "Eleanor Rigby" and "Blackbird", rank among the most covered songs in history. Although primarily a bassist with the Beatles, he has played a number of other instruments, including keyboards, guitars and drums, on various songs with all of his associated bands and projects.

After the Beatles disbanded, he debuted as a solo artist with the 1970 album McCartney and went on to form the band Wings with his first wife, Linda, and Denny Laine. Under McCartney's leadership, Wings became one of the most successful bands of the 1970s. He wrote or co-wrote their US or UK number-one hits, such as "My Love", "Band on the Run", "Listen to What the Man Said", "Silly Love Songs" and "Mull of Kintyre". He resumed his solo career in 1980 and has been touring as a solo artist since 1989. Apart from Wings, his UK or US number-one hits include "Uncle Albert/Admiral Halsey" (with Linda), "Coming Up", "Pipes of Peace", "Ebony and Ivory" (with Stevie Wonder), and "Say Say Say" (with Michael Jackson). McCartney has written more than a dozen songs with Elvis Costello and has promoted international charities related to animal rights, seal hunting, land mines, vegetarianism, poverty, and music education.

McCartney is one of the best-selling music artists of all time, with estimated sales of 100 million records. He is one of only three recording artists, along with Phil Collins and Jackson, who have sold over 100 million records both as solo artists and separately as principal members of a band. He has written or co-written a record 32 songs that have topped the Billboard Hot 100 and, as of 2009, he had sales of 25.5 million RIAA certified units in the US. McCartney's honours include two inductions into the Rock and Roll Hall of Fame (as a member of the Beatles in 1988 and as a solo artist in 1999), an Academy Award, a Primetime Emmy Award, 19 Grammy Awards, an appointment as a Member of the Order of the British Empire in 1965 and an appointment as Knight Bachelor in 1997 for services to music. As of 2024, he is one of the wealthiest musicians in the world, with an estimated fortune of £1 billion.

== Early life ==
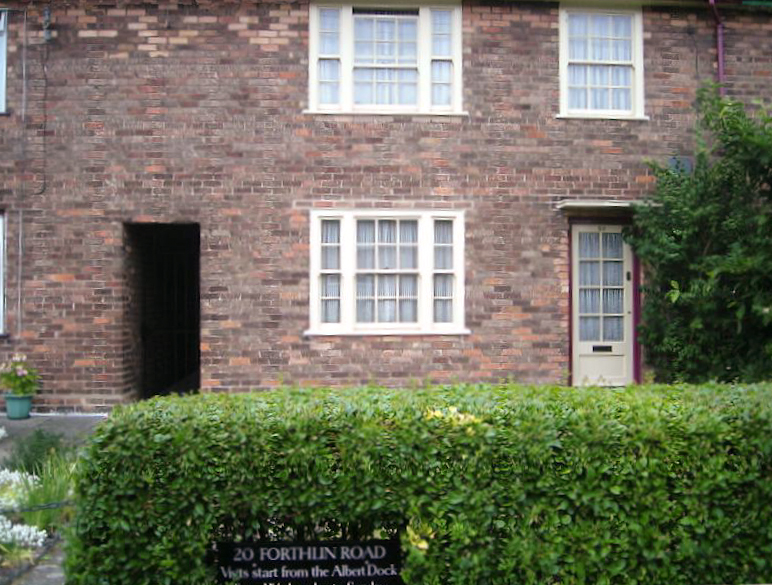
20 Forthlin Road, Allerton, where the McCartney family moved in 1955

James Paul McCartney was born on 18 June 1942 at Walton Hospital in the Walton area of Liverpool, where his mother, Mary Patricia (née Mohin), had qualified to practise as a nurse. His father, James, was known as Jim. Both of his parents were of Irish descent. McCartney has a younger brother, Peter Michael, and a younger stepsister, Ruth, born to Jim's second wife, Angie, during her first marriage. Paul and Michael were baptised in their mother's Catholic faith, even though their father was a former Protestant who had turned agnostic. Religion was not emphasised in the household.

Before the war, Jim had worked as a salesman for the cotton merchants A. Hannay and Co., having been promoted from his job as a sample boy in their warehouse; when the war broke out, Hannay's was shuttered, and Jim was employed as a lathe turner at Napier's defence engineering works, volunteering for the fire brigade at night. The growing family was rehoused at a flat in Knowsley in 1944 and then in a council housing development in Speke in 1946. After the war, Jim returned to his job at the cotton merchants with a reduced income. Mary's work as a visiting midwife was much more remunerative.

McCartney attended Stockton Wood Road Primary School in Speke from 1947 until 1949, when he transferred to Joseph Williams Junior School in Belle Vale because of overcrowding at Stockton. In 1953, he was one of only three students out of 90 to pass the 11-Plus exam, meaning he could attend the Liverpool Institute, a grammar school rather than a secondary modern school. In 1954, he met schoolmate George Harrison on the bus from his suburban home in Speke. The two quickly became friends; McCartney later admitted: "I tended to talk down to him because he was a year younger."

The type of people that I came from, I never saw better! [...] I mean, the Presidents, the Prime Minister, I never met anyone half as nice as some of the people I know from Liverpool who are nothing, who do nothing. They're not important or famous. But they are smart, like my dad was smart. I mean, people who can just cut through problems like a hot knife through butter. The kind of people you need in life. Salt of the earth.

— Paul McCartney, Playboy interview, 1984

Mary McCartney's midwifery paid well, and her earnings enabled them to move into 20 Forthlin Road in Allerton, where they lived until 1964. She rode a bicycle to her patients; McCartney described an early memory of her leaving at "about three in the morning [the] streets ... thick with snow". On 31 October 1956, when McCartney was 14, his mother died of an embolism as a complication of surgery for breast cancer. McCartney's loss later became a connection with John Lennon, whose mother, Julia, died in 1958 when Lennon was 17.

McCartney's father was a trumpet player and pianist who led Jim Mac's Jazz Band in the 1920s. He kept an upright piano in the front room, encouraged his sons to be musical and advised McCartney to take piano lessons. However, McCartney preferred to learn by ear. McCartney's father Joe played an E-flat tuba. McCartney's father also pointed out the bass parts in songs on the radio, and often took his sons to local brass band concerts. The first record he bought was Gene Vincent's "Be-Bop-a-Lula". When McCartney was 11, his father encouraged him to audition for the Liverpool Cathedral choir, but he was not accepted. McCartney then joined the choir at St Barnabas' Church, Mossley Hill. McCartney received a nickel-plated trumpet from his father for his fourteenth birthday, but when rock and roll became popular on Radio Luxembourg, McCartney traded it for a £15 Framus Zenith (model 17) acoustic guitar, since he wanted to be able to sing while playing. He found it difficult to play guitar right-handed, but after noticing a poster advertising a Slim Whitman concert and realising that Whitman played left-handed, he reversed the order of the strings. McCartney wrote his first song, "I Lost My Little Girl", on the Zenith, and composed another early tune that would become "When I'm Sixty-Four" on the piano. American rhythm and blues influenced him, and Little Richard was his schoolboy idol; "Long Tall Sally" was the first song McCartney performed in public, at a Butlin's Filey holiday camp talent competition.

== Career ==
=== 1957–1960: The Quarrymen ===
At the age of fifteen on 6 July 1957, McCartney met John Lennon and his band, the Quarrymen, at the St Peter's Church Hall fête in Woolton. The Quarrymen played a mix of rock and roll and skiffle, a type of popular music with jazz, blues and folk influences. McCartney impressed Lennon with a performance of Eddie Cochran's "Twenty Flight Rock". Soon afterwards, the Quarrymen invited McCartney to join as a rhythm guitarist, and he formed a close working relationship with Lennon. Harrison joined in 1958 as lead guitarist, followed by Lennon's art school friend Stuart Sutcliffe on bass, in 1960. By May 1960, the band had tried several names, including Johnny and the Moondogs, Beatals and the Silver Beetles. They adopted the name the Beatles in August 1960 and recruited drummer Pete Best shortly before a five-engagement residency in Hamburg. He used the alias Paul Ramon.

=== 1960–1970: The Beatles ===
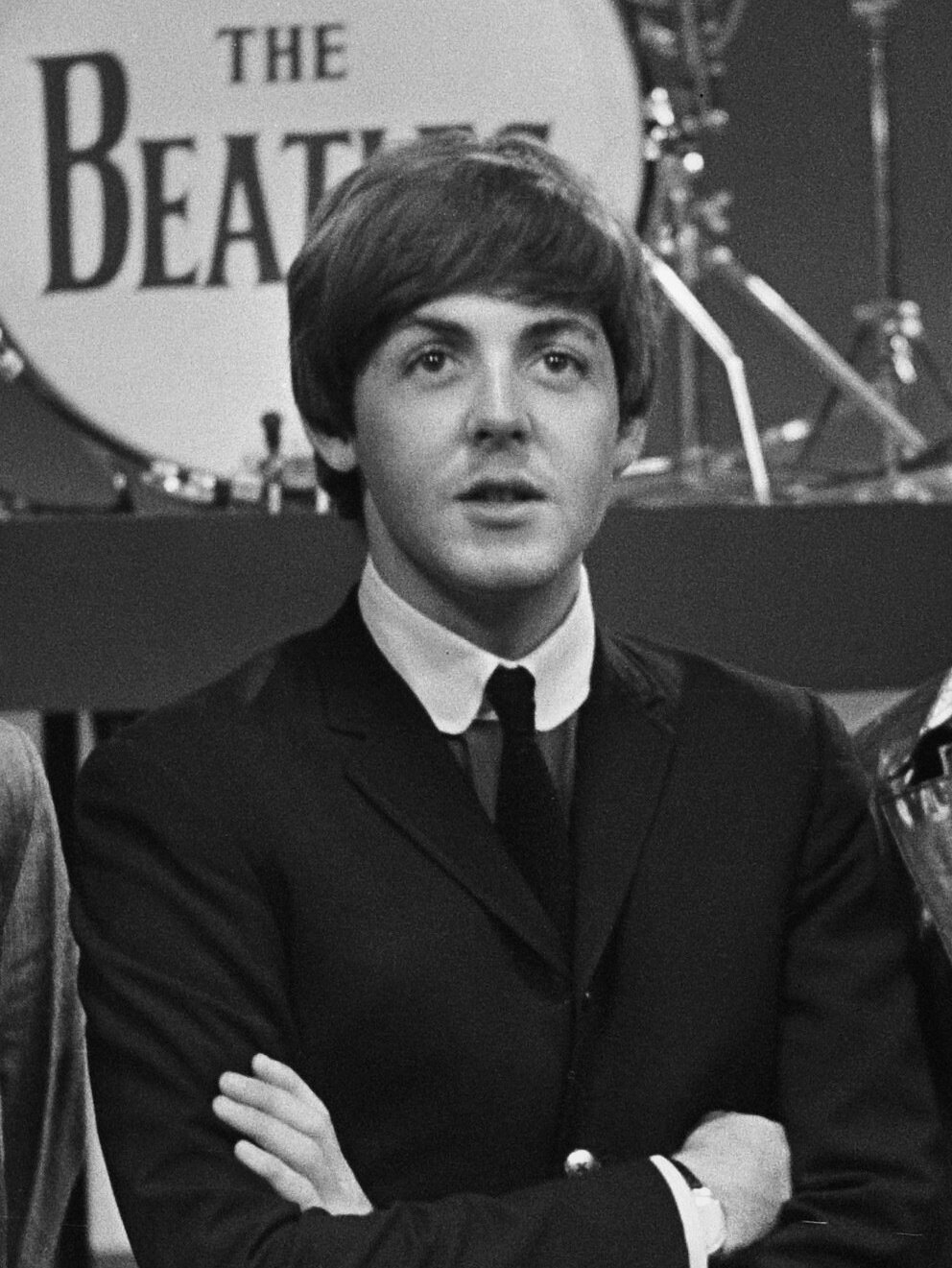
McCartney in 1964

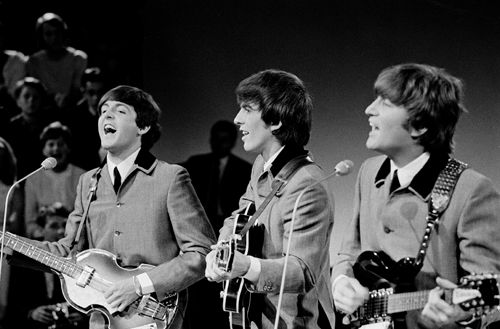
McCartney (left) performing with the Beatles on Dutch TV in 1964

In 1961, Sutcliffe left the Beatles, and McCartney became their bass player. It is disputed whether he did so reluctantly or actively sought out the role. While in Hamburg, they recorded professionally for the first time and were credited as the Beat Brothers, who were the backing band for English singer Tony Sheridan on the single "My Bonnie". This resulted in attention from Brian Epstein, who was a key figure in their subsequent development and success. He became their manager in January 1962. Ringo Starr replaced Best in August, and the band had their first hit, "Love Me Do", in October, becoming popular in the UK in 1963, and in the US a year later. The fan hysteria became known as "Beatlemania", and the press sometimes referred to McCartney as the "cute Beatle". (Note: In 1963, the Beatles released two studio albums: Please Please Me and With the Beatles. Two more albums followed in 1964: A Hard Day's Night and Beatles for Sale.) McCartney co-wrote (with Lennon) several of their early hits, including "I Saw Her Standing There", "She Loves You", "I Want to Hold Your Hand" (1963) and "Can't Buy Me Love" (1964).

In August 1965, the Beatles released the McCartney composition "Yesterday", featuring a string quartet. Included on the Help! LP, the song was the group's first recorded use of classical music elements and their first recording that involved only a single band member. "Yesterday" became one of the most covered songs in popular music history. Later that year, during recording sessions for Rubber Soul, McCartney began to supplant Lennon as the dominant musical force in the band. Musicologist Ian MacDonald wrote, "from [1965] [...] [McCartney] would be in the ascendant not only as a songwriter, but also as instrumentalist, arranger, producer, and de facto musical director of the Beatles." Critics described Rubber Soul as a significant advance in the refinement and profundity of the band's music and lyrics. Considered a high point in the Beatles catalogue, both Lennon and McCartney said they had written the music for the song "In My Life". McCartney said of the album, "we'd had our cute period, and now it was time to expand." Recording engineer Norman Smith stated that the Rubber Soul sessions exposed indications of increasing contention within the band: "the clash between John and Paul was becoming obvious [...] [and] as far as Paul was concerned, George [Harrison] could do no right—Paul was absolutely finicky."

In 1966, the Beatles released the album Revolver. Featuring sophisticated lyrics, studio experimentation, and an expanded repertoire of musical genres ranging from innovative string arrangements to psychedelic rock, the album marked an artistic leap for the Beatles. The first of three consecutive McCartney A-sides, the single "Paperback Writer" preceded the LP's release. The Beatles produced a short promotional film for the song, and another for its B-side, "Rain". The films, described by Harrison as "the forerunner of videos", aired on The Ed Sullivan Show and Top of the Pops in June 1966. Revolver also included McCartney's "Eleanor Rigby", which featured a string octet. According to Jonathan Gould, the song is "a neoclassical tour de force [...] a true hybrid, conforming to no recognizable style or genre of song". Except for some backing vocals, the song included only McCartney's lead vocal and the strings arranged by producer George Martin. (Note: Also included on Revolver was "Here, There and Everywhere", a McCartney composition which is his second favourite after "Yesterday".)

The band gave their final commercial concert at the end of their 1966 US tour. Later that year, McCartney completed his first musical project independent of the group—a film score for the UK production The Family Way. The score was a collaboration with Martin, who used two McCartney themes to write thirteen variations. The soundtrack failed to chart, but it won McCartney an Ivor Novello Award for Best Instrumental Theme. Upon the end of the Beatles' performing career, McCartney sensed unease in the band and wanted them to maintain creative productivity. He pressed them to start a new project, which became Sgt. Pepper's Lonely Hearts Club Band, widely regarded as rock's first concept album. McCartney was inspired to create a new persona for the group, to serve as a vehicle for experimentation and to demonstrate to their fans that they had musically matured. He invented the fictional band of the album's title track. As McCartney explained, "We were fed up with being the Beatles. We really hated that fucking four little mop-top approach. We were not boys we were men [...] and [we] thought of ourselves as artists rather than just performers."

After Brian died [...] Paul took over and supposedly led us you know [...] we went round in circles [...] We broke up then. That was the disintegration. I thought, 'we've fuckin' had it.'

— John Lennon, Rolling Stone magazine, 1970

Starting in November 1966, the band adopted an experimental attitude during recording sessions for the album. Their recording of "A Day in the Life" required a forty-piece orchestra, which Martin and McCartney took turns conducting. The sessions produced the double A-side single "Strawberry Fields Forever"/"Penny Lane" in February 1967, and the LP followed in June. (Note: Written by McCartney as a commentary on his childhood in Liverpool, "Penny Lane" featured a piccolo trumpet solo inspired by Bach's second Brandenburg concerto.) Based on an ink drawing by McCartney, the LP's cover included a collage designed by pop artists Peter Blake and Jann Haworth, featuring the Beatles in costume as the Sgt. Pepper's Lonely Hearts Club Band, standing with a host of celebrities. The cover piqued a frenzy of analysis.

Epstein's death in August 1967 created a void, which left the Beatles perplexed and concerned about their future. McCartney stepped in to fill that void and gradually became the de facto leader and business manager of the group that Lennon had once led. In his first creative suggestion after this change of leadership, McCartney proposed that the band move forward on their plans to produce a film for television, which was to become Magical Mystery Tour. According to Beatles historian Mark Lewisohn, the project was "an administrative nightmare throughout". McCartney largely directed the film, which brought the group their first unfavourable critical response. By late 1968, relations within the band were deteriorating. The tension grew during the recording of their eponymous double album, also known as the "White Album". (Note: The Beatles was the band's first Apple Records LP release; the label was a subsidiary of Apple Corps, a conglomerate formed as part of Epstein's plan to reduce the group's taxes.) Matters worsened the following year during the Let It Be sessions, when a camera crew filmed McCartney lecturing the group: "We've been very negative since Mr. Epstein passed away ... we were always fighting [his] discipline a bit, but it's silly to fight that discipline if it's our own."

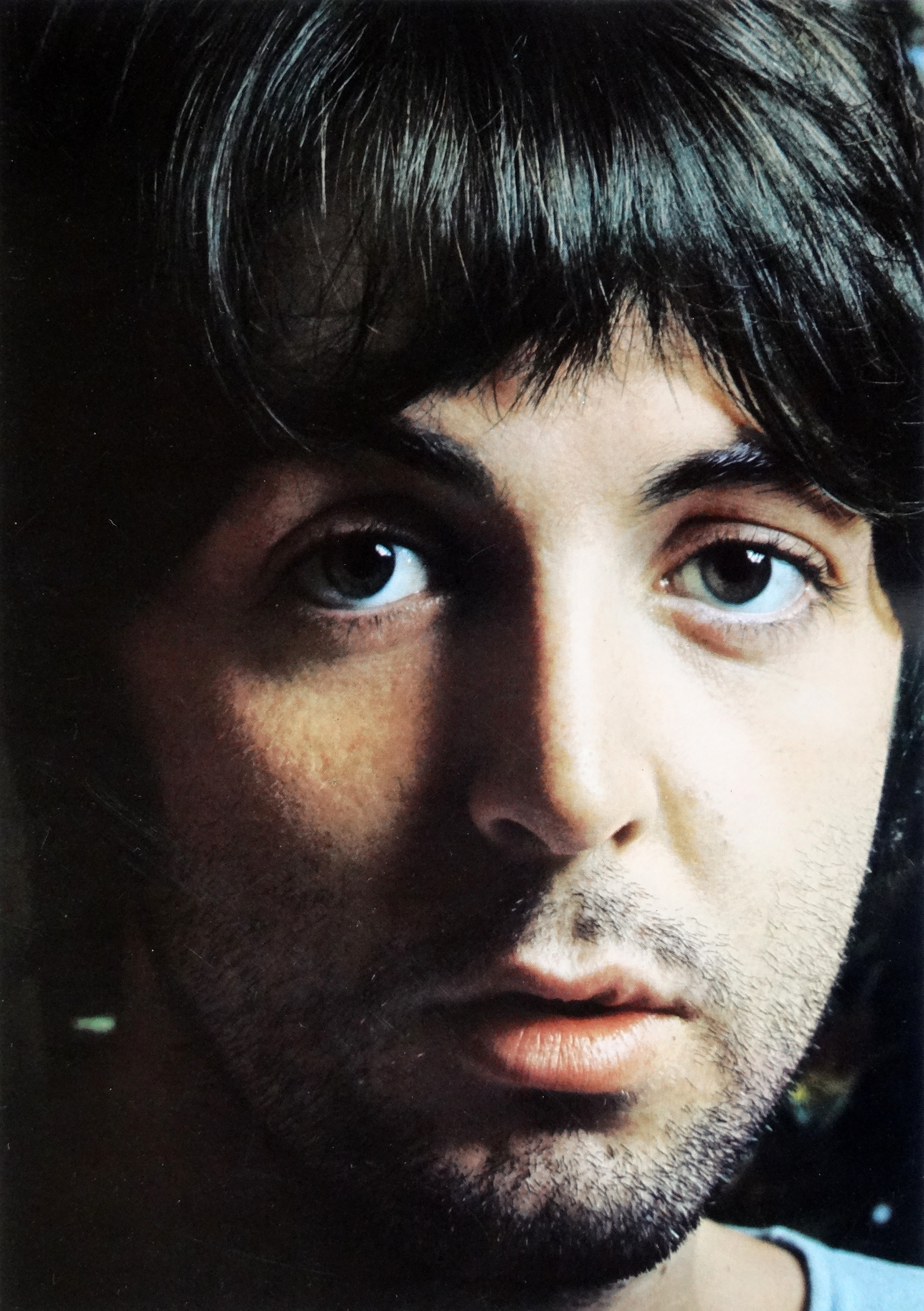
McCartney in 1968

In March 1969, McCartney married his first wife, Linda Eastman, and in August, the couple had their first child, Mary, named after his late mother. Abbey Road was the band's last recorded album, and Martin suggested "a continuously moving piece of music", urging the group to think symphonically. McCartney agreed, but Lennon did not. They eventually compromised, agreeing to McCartney's suggestion: an LP featuring individual songs on side one and a long medley on side two. In October 1969, a rumour surfaced that McCartney had died in a car crash in 1966 and was replaced by a lookalike. This was quickly refuted when a November Life cover featured him and his family, accompanied by the caption "Paul is still with us".

John Lennon privately left the Beatles in September 1969, though agreed not to go public with the information to not jeopardise ongoing business negotiations. McCartney was in the midst of business disagreements with his bandmates, largely concerning Allen Klein's management of the group, when he announced his own departure from the group on 10 April 1970. He filed a suit for the band's formal dissolution on 31 December 1970, and in March 1971 the court appointed a receiver to oversee the finances of the Beatles' company Apple Corps. An English court legally dissolved the Beatles' partnership on 9 January 1975, though sporadic lawsuits against their record company EMI, Klein, and each other persisted until 1989. (Note: When the Beatles were inducted into the Rock and Roll Hall of Fame in 1988, their first year of eligibility, McCartney did not attend the ceremony, stating that unresolved legal disputes would make him "feel like a complete hypocrite waving and smiling with [Harrison and Starr] at a fake reunion".) (Note: The Beatles released twenty-two UK singles and twelve LPs, of which seventeen singles and eleven LPs reached number one on various charts. The band topped the US Billboard Hot 100 twenty times, and recorded fourteen number-one albums, as Lennon and McCartney became one of the most celebrated songwriting partnerships of the 20th century. McCartney was the primary writer of five of their last six US number-one singles: "Hello, Goodbye" (1967), "Hey Jude" (1968), "Get Back (1969)", "Let It Be" and "The Long and Winding Road" (1970).)

=== 1970–1981: Wings ===
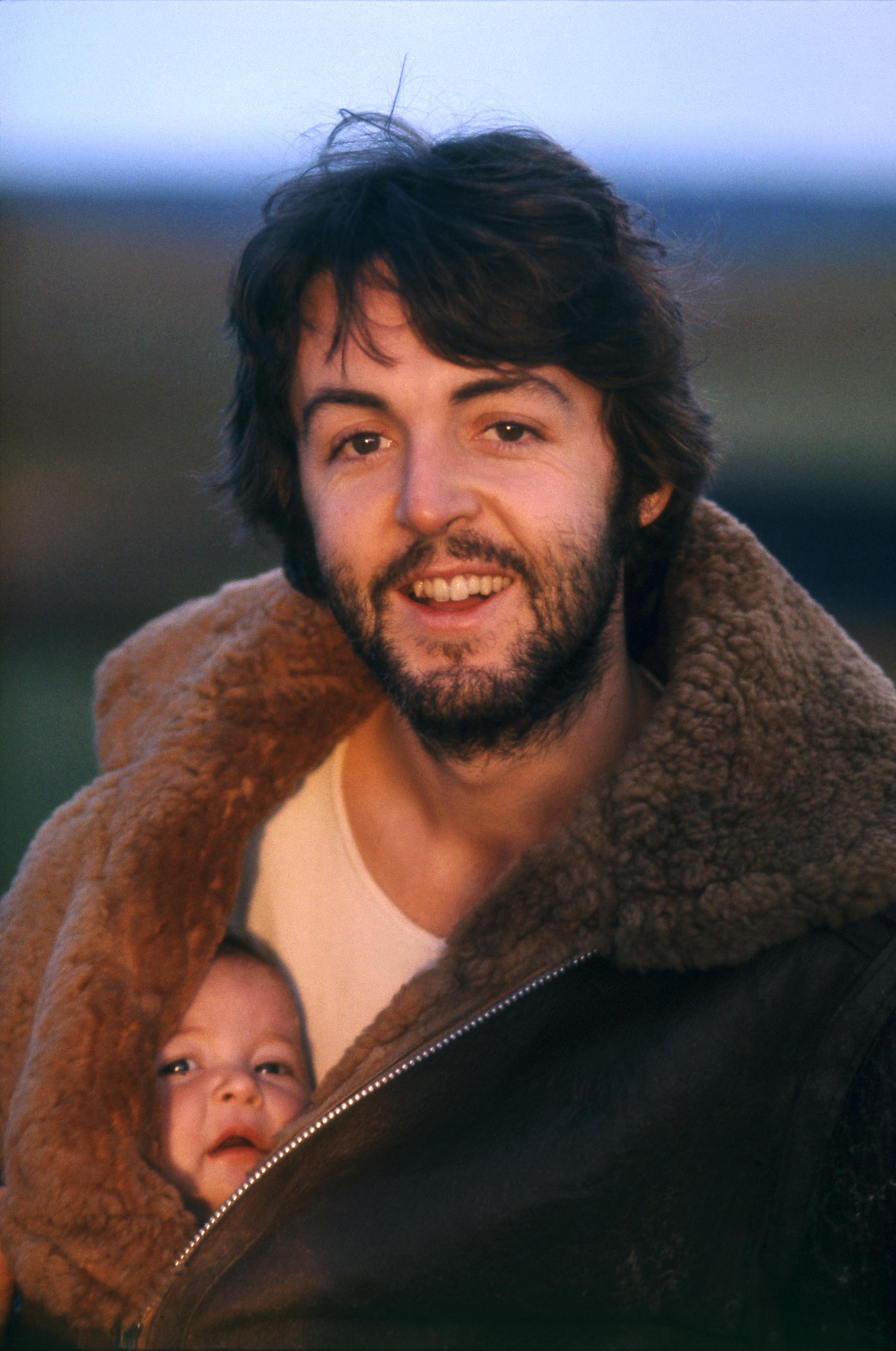
McCartney in 1969, around the time he recorded his first solo album McCartney.

I didn't really want to keep going as a solo artist [...] so it became obvious that I had to get a band together [...] Linda and I talked it through and it was like, "Yeah, but let's not put together a supergroup, let's go back to square one."

— McCartney

In 1970, McCartney continued his musical career with his first solo release, McCartney, a US number-one album. Apart from some vocal contributions from Linda, McCartney is a one-man album, with McCartney providing compositions, instrumentation and vocals. (Note: McCartney peaked in the UK at number two, spending thirty-two weeks in the charts.) In 1971, he collaborated with Linda and drummer Denny Seiwell on a second album, Ram. A UK number one and a US top five, Ram included the co-written US number-one hit single "Uncle Albert/Admiral Halsey". Later that year, ex-Moody Blues guitarist Denny Laine joined the McCartneys and Seiwell to form the band Wings. McCartney had this to say on the group's formation: "Wings were always a difficult idea [...] any group having to follow [the Beatles'] success would have a hard job [...] I found myself in that very position. However, it was a choice between going on or finishing, and I loved music too much to think of stopping." (Note: Wings' first album together, Wild Life, reached the top ten in the US and the top twenty in the UK, staying on the UK charts for nine weeks.) In September 1971, the McCartneys' daughter Stella was born, named in honour of Linda's grandmothers, both of whom were named Stella.

Following the addition of guitarist Henry McCullough, Wings' first concert tour began in 1972 with a debut performance in front of an audience of seven hundred at the University of Nottingham. Ten more gigs followed as they travelled across the UK in a van during an unannounced tour of universities, during which the band stayed in modest accommodation and received pay in coinage collected from students, while avoiding Beatles songs during their performances. McCartney later said, "The main thing I didn't want was to come on stage, faced with the whole torment of five rows of press people with little pads, all looking at me and saying, 'Oh well, he is not as good as he was.' So we decided to go out on that university tour which made me less nervous [...] by the end of that tour I felt ready for something else, so we went into Europe." During the seven-week, 25-show Wings Over Europe Tour, the band played almost solely Wings and McCartney solo material: the Little Richard cover "Long Tall Sally" was the only song that the Beatles had previously recorded. McCartney wanted the tour to avoid large venues; most of the small halls they played had capacities of fewer than 3,000 people.

In March 1973, Wings achieved their first US number-one single, "My Love", included on their second LP, Red Rose Speedway, a US number one and UK top five. (Note: In May 1973, Wings began a 21-show tour of the UK, this time with supporting act Brinsley Schwarz.) McCartney's collaboration with Linda and former Beatles producer Martin resulted in the song "Live and Let Die", which was the theme song for the James Bond film of the same name. Nominated for an Academy Award, the song reached number two in the US and number nine in the UK. It also earned Martin a Grammy for his orchestral arrangement. Music professor and author Vincent Benitez described the track as "symphonic rock at its best". (Note: "Live and Let Die" became a staple of McCartney's live shows, its modern sound well-suited for the pyrotechnics and laser light displays Wings employed during their 1970s stadium performances.)

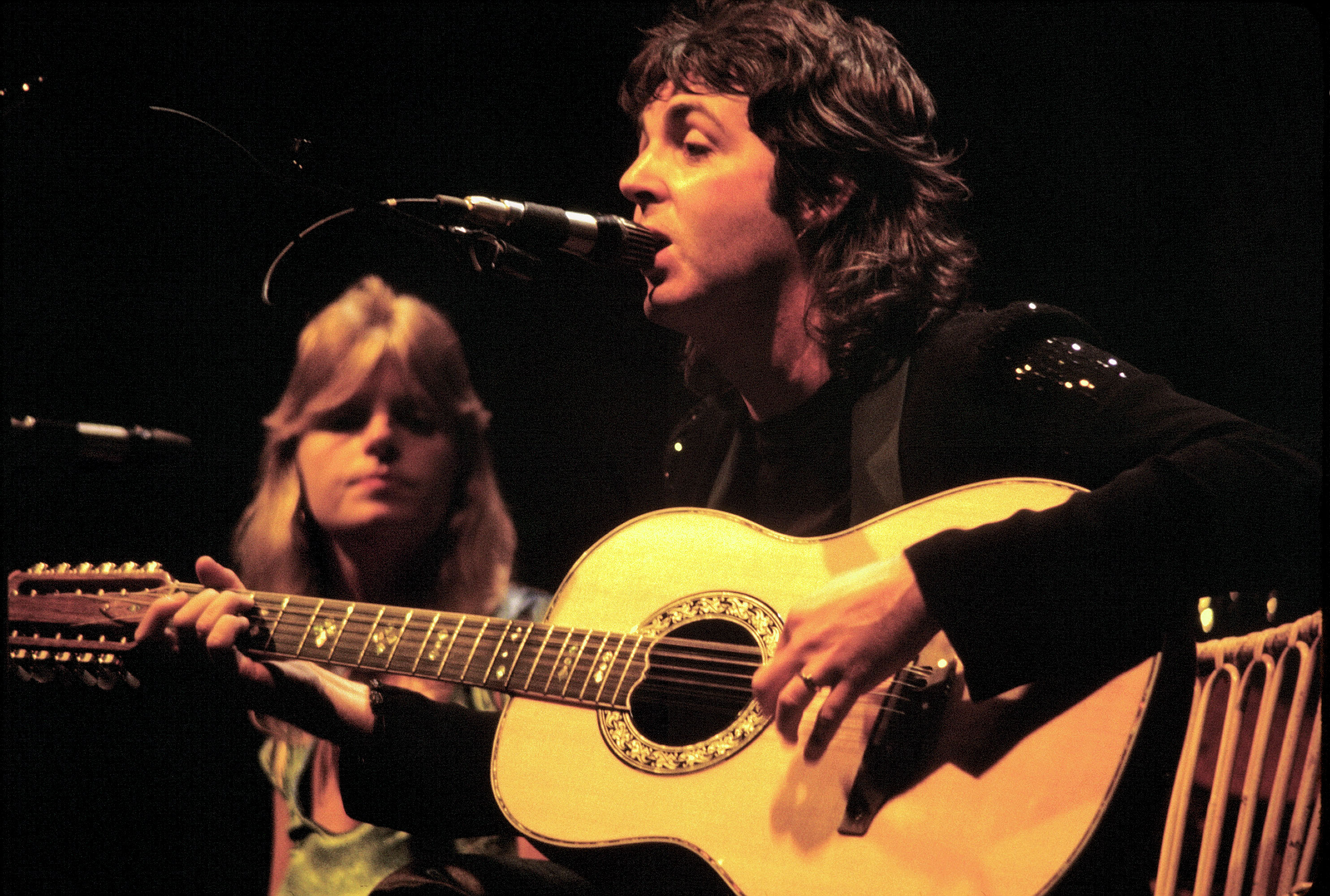
Performing with then wife Linda in 1976

After the departure of McCullough and Seiwell in 1973, the McCartneys and Laine recorded Band on the Run. The album was the first of seven platinum Wings LPs. It was a US and UK number one, the band's first to top the charts in both countries and the first ever to reach the Billboard charts on three occasions. One of the best-selling releases of the decade, it remained on the UK charts for 124 weeks. Rolling Stone named it one of the Best Albums of the Year for 1973, and in 1975, Paul McCartney and Wings won the Grammy Award for Best Pop Vocal Performance for the song "Band on the Run", and Geoff Emerick won the Grammy for Best Engineered Recording for the album. (Note: Band on the Run became the UK's first platinum LP.) In 1974, Wings achieved a second US number-one single with the title track. The album also included the top-ten hits "Jet" and "Helen Wheels", and earned the 418th spot on Rolling Stone's list of the 500 Greatest Albums of All Time. In 1974, McCartney hired guitarist Jimmy McCulloch and drummer Geoff Britton to replace McCullough and Seiwell. Britton subsequently quit during recording sessions in 1975 and was replaced by Joe English.

Wings followed Band on the Run with the chart-topping albums Venus and Mars (1975) and Wings at the Speed of Sound (1976). (Note: Wings at the Speed of Sound peaked in the UK at number 2, spending 35 weeks in the charts. In the UK, NME was alone in ranking the album number 1. The LP reached number 1 on three charts in the US.) In 1975, they began the fourteen-month Wings Over the World Tour, which included stops in the UK, Australia, Europe and the US. The tour marked the first time McCartney performed Beatles songs live with Wings, with five in the two-hour set list: "I've Just Seen a Face", "Yesterday", "Blackbird", "Lady Madonna" and "The Long and Winding Road". Following the second European leg of the tour and extensive rehearsals in London, the group undertook an ambitious US arena tour that yielded the US number-one live triple LP Wings over America.

In September 1977, the McCartneys' third child was born, a son they named James. In November, the Wings song "Mull of Kintyre", co-written with Laine, was quickly becoming one of the best-selling singles in UK chart history. The most successful single of McCartney's solo career, it achieved double the sales of the previous record holder, "She Loves You", and went on to sell 2.5 million copies and hold the UK sales record until the 1984 charity single, "Do They Know It's Christmas?" (Note: In 1977, McCartney released the album Thrillington, an orchestral arrangement of Ram, under the pseudonym Percy "Thrills" Thrillington, with a cover designed by Hipgnosis.)

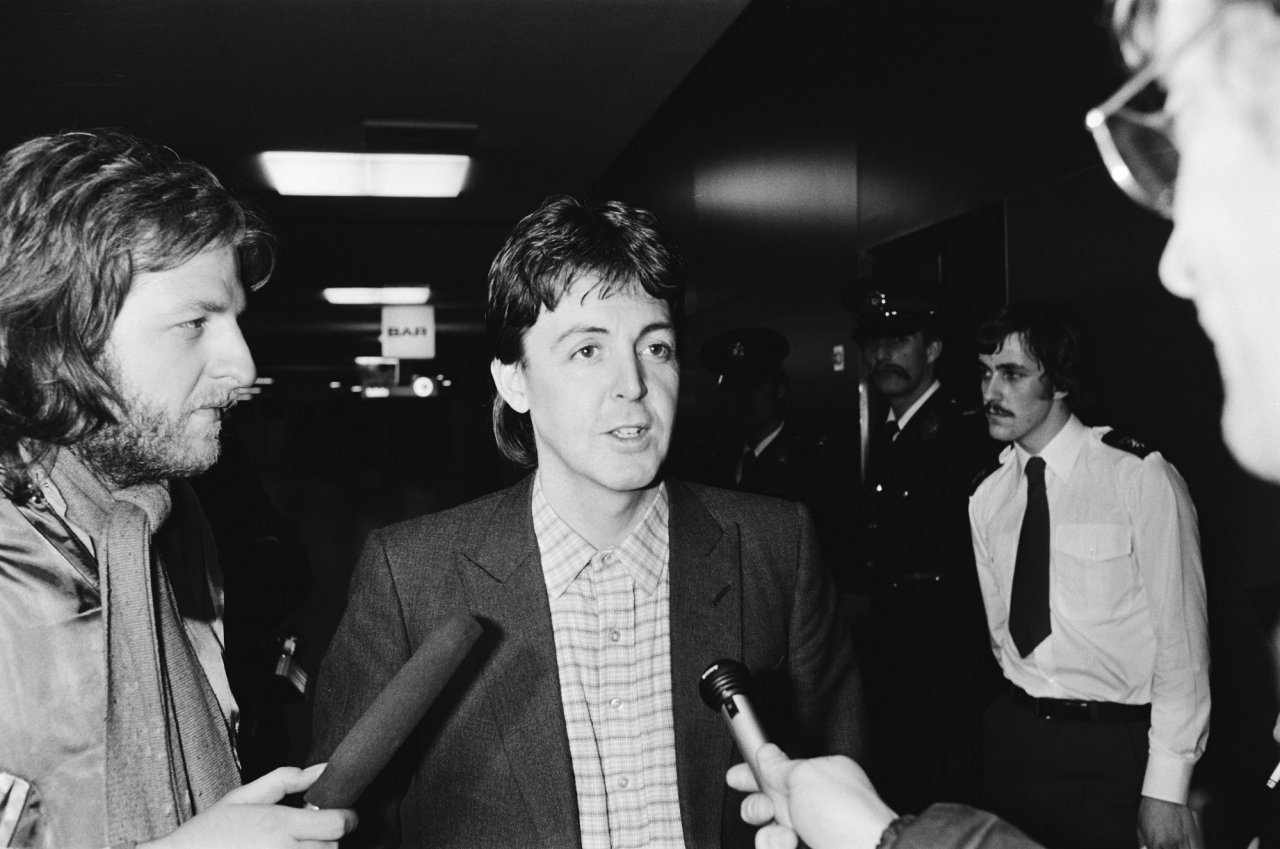
At Amsterdam's Schiphol Airport, January 1980

London Town (1978) spawned a US number-one single ("With a Little Luck"), and continued Wings' string of commercial successes, making the top five in both the US and the UK. Critical reception was unfavourable, and McCartney expressed disappointment with the album. (Note: During the production of London Town, McCulloch and English quit Wings; they were replaced by guitarist Laurence Juber and drummer Steve Holly.) Back to the Egg (1979) featured McCartney's assemblage of a rock supergroup dubbed "Rockestra" on two tracks. The band included Wings along with Pete Townshend, David Gilmour, Gary Brooker, John Paul Jones, John Bonham and others. Though certified platinum, critics panned the album. Wings completed their final concert tour in 1979, with twenty shows in the UK that included the live debut of the Beatles songs "Got to Get You into My Life", "The Fool on the Hill" and "Let It Be".

In 1980, McCartney released his second solo LP, the self-produced McCartney II, which peaked at number one in the UK and number three in the US. As with his first album, he composed and performed it alone. The album contained the song "Coming Up", the live version of which, recorded in Glasgow, Scotland, in 1979 by Wings, became the group's last number-one hit. By 1981, McCartney felt he had accomplished all he could creatively with Wings and decided he needed a change. The group discontinued in April 1981 after Laine quit following disagreements over royalties and salaries. (Note: Other factors in Wings' split included tension caused by the disappointment of their last effort, Back to the Egg, and McCartney's 1980 marijuana bust in Japan, which resulted in the cancelling of the tour and caused a major loss of wages for the group. Laine claimed that a significant cause of their dissolution was McCartney's reluctance to tour, fearing for his personal safety after the 1980 murder of Lennon. McCartney's then-spokesman said, "Paul is doing other things, that's all".) (Note: Wings produced a total of seven studio albums, two of which topped the UK charts and four the US charts. Their live triple LP, Wings over America, was one of only a few live albums ever to achieve the top spot in America. They made six US Billboard number-one singles, including "Listen to What the Man Said" and "Silly Love Songs", as well as eight top-ten singles. They achieved eight RIAA-certified platinum singles and six platinum albums in the US. In the UK, they achieved one number-one and twelve top-ten singles, as well as two number-one LPs.)

=== 1982–1990 ===
McCartney with Michael Jackson around 1982. They collaborated on songs such as "Say Say Say" and "The Girl Is Mine"

In 1982, McCartney collaborated with Stevie Wonder on the Martin-produced number-one hit "Ebony and Ivory", included on McCartney's Tug of War LP, and with Michael Jackson on "The Girl Is Mine" from Thriller. (Note: Tug of War was a number-one album in both the UK and the US.) "Ebony and Ivory" was McCartney's record 28th single to hit number one on the Billboard Hot 100. The following year, he and Jackson worked on "Say Say Say", McCartney's most recent US number one as of 2014. McCartney earned his latest UK number one as of 2014 with the title track of his LP release that year, "Pipes of Peace". (Note: Pipes of Peace peaked in the UK at number 4, spending 23 weeks in the charts. The LP reached number 15 in the US and is McCartney's most recently recorded RIAA certified platinum studio album as of 2012.)

In 1984, McCartney starred in Give My Regards to Broad Street, a feature film he also wrote and produced and which included Starr in an acting role. It was disparaged by critics: Variety described the film as "characterless, bloodless, and pointless"; while Roger Ebert awarded it a single star, writing, "you can safely skip the movie and proceed directly to the soundtrack". The album fared much better, reaching number one in the UK and producing the US top-ten hit single "No More Lonely Nights", featuring David Gilmour on lead guitar. In 1985, Warner Brothers commissioned McCartney to write a song for the comedic feature film Spies Like Us. He composed and recorded the track in four days, with Phil Ramone co-producing. (Note: "Spies Like Us" peaked in the UK at number 13 spending 10 weeks in the charts. The single reached number 7 in the US and is McCartney's most recently recorded US top-ten as of 2012.) McCartney participated in Live Aid, performing "Let it Be", but technical difficulties rendered his vocals and piano barely audible for the first two verses, punctuated by squeals of feedback. Equipment technicians resolved the problems and David Bowie, Alison Moyet, Pete Townshend and Bob Geldof joined McCartney on stage, receiving an enthusiastic crowd reaction.

McCartney collaborated with Eric Stewart on Press to Play (1986), with Stewart co-writing more than half the songs on the LP. (Note: Press to Play reached number 8 in the UK, and number 30 in the US.) In 1988, McCartney released Снова в СССР, initially available only in the Soviet Union, which contained eighteen covers; recorded over the course of two days. In 1989, he joined forces with fellow Merseysiders Gerry Marsden and Holly Johnson to record an updated version of "Ferry Cross the Mersey", for the Hillsborough disaster appeal fund. (Note: In 1989, "Ferry Cross the Mersey" reached number 1 in the UK.) That same year, he released Flowers in the Dirt; a collaborative effort with Elvis Costello that included musical contributions from Gilmour and Nicky Hopkins. (Note: Flowers in the Dirt is McCartney's most recent UK number-one album as of 2012; it reached number 21 in the US.) McCartney then formed a band consisting of himself and Linda, with Hamish Stuart and Robbie McIntosh on guitars, Paul "Wix" Wickens on keyboards and Chris Whitten on drums. In September 1989, they launched the Paul McCartney World Tour, his first in over a decade. During the tour, McCartney performed for the largest paying stadium audience in history on 21 April 1990, when 184,000 people attended his concert at Maracanã Stadium in Rio de Janeiro, Brazil. That year, he released the triple album Tripping the Live Fantastic, which contained selected performances from the tour. (Note: Tripping the Live Fantastic reached number 17 in the UK and number 26 in the US.) (Note: During the ten-month, 104-show Tripping the Live Fantastic tour, McCartney played as many as fourteen Beatles songs a night, comprising nearly half the performance)

=== 1991–1999 ===
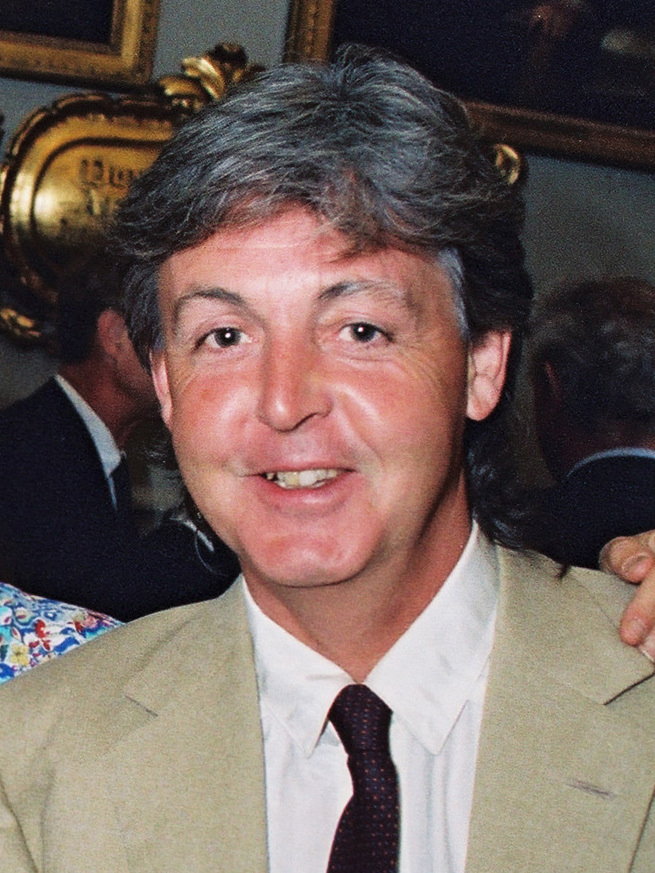
McCartney in 1992

McCartney ventured into orchestral music in 1991 when the Royal Liverpool Philharmonic Society commissioned a musical piece by him to celebrate its sesquicentennial. He collaborated with composer Carl Davis, producing Liverpool Oratorio. The performance featured opera singers Kiri Te Kanawa, Sally Burgess, Jerry Hadley and Willard White with the Royal Liverpool Philharmonic Orchestra and the choir of Liverpool Cathedral. Reviews were negative. The Guardian was especially critical, describing the music as "afraid of anything approaching a fast tempo", and adding that the piece has "little awareness of the need for recurrent ideas that will bind the work into a whole". The paper published a letter McCartney submitted in response in which he noted several of the work's faster tempos and added, "happily, history shows that many good pieces of music were not liked by the critics of the time so I am content to [...] let people judge for themselves the merits of the work." The New York Times was slightly more generous, stating, "There are moments of beauty and pleasure in this dramatic miscellany [...] the music's innocent sincerity makes it difficult to be put off by its ambitions". Performed around the world after its London premiere, the Liverpool Oratorio reached number one on the UK classical chart, Music Week.

In 1991, McCartney performed a selection of acoustic-only songs on MTV Unplugged and released a live album of the performance titled Unplugged (The Official Bootleg). (Note: Unplugged: The Official Bootleg reached number 7 in the UK and number 14 in the US.) During the 1990s, McCartney collaborated twice with Youth of Killing Joke as the musical duo "the Fireman". The two released their first electronica album together, Strawberries Oceans Ships Forest, in 1993. McCartney released the rock album Off the Ground in 1993. (Note: Off the Ground reached number 5 in the UK and number 17 in the US.) The subsequent New World Tour followed, which led to the release of the Paul Is Live album later that year. (Note: Paul is Live reached number 34 in the UK and number 78 in the US.) (Note: For the New World Tour, Whitten was replaced by drummer Blair Cunningham. McCartney's 1993 tour of the US was the second highest grossing effort of the year in America, bringing in $32.3 million from twenty-four shows.)

Starting in 1994, McCartney took a four-year break from his solo career to work on Apple's Beatles Anthology project with Harrison, Starr and Martin. He recorded a radio series called Oobu Joobu in 1995 for the American network Westwood One, which he described as "widescreen radio". Also in 1995, Prince Charles presented him with an Honorary Fellowship of the Royal College of Music—"kind of amazing for somebody who doesn't read a note of music", commented McCartney.

In 1997, McCartney released the rock album Flaming Pie. Starr appeared on drums and backing vocals in "Beautiful Night". (Note: Flaming Pie reached number 2 in the UK and the US. It also yielded McCartney's highest charting UK top-twenty hit song as of 2012, "Young Boy", which reached number 19.) Later that year, he released the classical work Standing Stone, which topped the UK and US classical charts. In 1998, he released Rushes, the second electronica album by the Fireman. In 1999, McCartney released Run Devil Run. (Note: Run Devil Run reached number 12 in the UK and number 27 in the US.) Recorded in one week, and featuring Ian Paice and David Gilmour, it was primarily an album of covers with three McCartney originals. He had been planning such an album for years, having been previously encouraged to do so by Linda, who had died of cancer in April 1998.

McCartney did an unannounced performance at the benefit tribute, "Concert for Linda", his wife of 29 years who died a year earlier. It was held at the Royal Albert Hall in London on 10 April 1999, and was organised by two of her close friends, Chrissie Hynde and Carla Lane. Also during 1999, he continued his experimentation with orchestral music on Working Classical.

=== 2000–2009 ===
In 2000, he released the electronica album Liverpool Sound Collage with Super Furry Animals and Youth, using the sound collage and musique concrète techniques that had fascinated him in the mid-1960s. He contributed the song "Nova" to a tribute album of classical, choral music called A Garland for Linda (2000), dedicated to his late wife. In 2001, McCartney recorded a version of "That's All Right" with Elvis Presley's original guitarist Scotty Moore and original drummer D. J. Fontana.

Having witnessed the September 11 attacks from the JFK airport tarmac, McCartney was inspired to take a leading role in organising the Concert for New York City. His studio album release in November that year, Driving Rain, included the song "Freedom", written in response to the attacks. (Note: Driving Rain reached number 46 in the UK and number 26 in the US.) The following year, McCartney went out on tour with a new band that included guitarists Rusty Anderson and Brian Ray, accompanied by Paul "Wix" Wickens on keyboards and Abe Laboriel Jr. on drums. They began the Driving World Tour in April 2002, which included stops in the US, Mexico and Japan. The tour resulted in the double live album Back in the US, released internationally in 2003 as Back in the World. (Note: Back in the US reached number 8 in the US, and Back in the World reached number 5 in the UK.) (Note: During the Driving World Tour McCartney performed twenty-three Beatles songs in a thirty-six song set, including an all-Beatles encore.) The tour earned a reported $126.2 million, an average of over $2 million per night, and Billboard named it the top tour of the year. The group continues to play together; McCartney has played live with Ray, Anderson, Laboriel, and Wickens longer than he played live with the Beatles or Wings.

In July 2002, McCartney married Heather Mills. In November, on the first anniversary of George Harrison's death, McCartney performed at the Concert for George. He participated in the National Football League's Super Bowl, performing "Freedom" during the pre-game show for Super Bowl XXXVI in 2002 and headlining the halftime show at Super Bowl XXXIX in 2005. The English College of Arms honoured McCartney in 2002 by granting him a coat of arms. His crest, featuring a Liver bird holding an acoustic guitar in its claw, reflects his background in Liverpool and his musical career. The shield includes four curved emblems which resemble beetles' backs. The arms' motto is Ecce Cor Meum, Latin for "Behold My Heart". In 2003, the McCartneys had a child, Beatrice Milly.

In July 2005, McCartney performed at the Live 8 event in Hyde Park, London, opening the show with "Sgt. Pepper's Lonely Hearts Club Band" (with U2) and closing it with "Drive My Car" (with George Michael), "Helter Skelter", and "The Long and Winding Road". (Note: In June 2005, McCartney released the electronica album Twin Freaks, a collaborative project with bootleg producer Freelance Hellraiser consisting of remixed versions of songs from his solo career.) In September, he released the rock album Chaos and Creation in the Backyard, for which he provided most of the instrumentation. (Note: Chaos and Creation in the Backyard is McCartney's most recent top-ten album as of 2012. It reached number 10 in the UK, and number 6 in the US. It was supported by a UK top-twenty hit single, his most recent as of 2014, "Fine Line", which failed to chart in the US, and "Jenny Wren", which reached number 22 in the UK.) (Note: McCartney followed the release of Chaos and Creation in the Backyard with the 'US' Tour, the tenth top earning act of 2005 in the US, taking in over $17 million in ticket sales for eight shows. During the opening performance of the tour, he played thirty-five songs, of which twenty-three were Beatles tracks.) In 2006, McCartney released the classical work Ecce Cor Meum. (Note: Ecce Cor Meum reached number 2 on the classical charts in both the UK and the US.) The rock album Memory Almost Full followed in 2007. (Note: Memory Almost Full reached number 3 in the US and spending fifteen weeks in the charts. As of 2014, it remains McCartney's most recent top-five album.)

In 2008, he released his third Fireman album, Electric Arguments. (Note: Electric Arguments reached number 67 on the Billboard 200 and number one on the Independent Albums chart.) In September 2008, McCartney performed at Yarkon Park in Tel Aviv, his first ever concert in Israel, during the country's 60th anniversary year. His setlist featured 31 songs from both his Beatles and Wings catalogues. During the trip, he also visited Bethlehem, where he addressed the region's political situation, telling reporters, "All we need is peace in the region and a two-state solution." Also in 2008, he performed at a concert in Liverpool to celebrate the city's year as European Capital of Culture. In 2009, after a four-year break, he returned to touring and has since performed over 80 shows. More than forty-five years after the Beatles first appeared on American television during The Ed Sullivan Show, he returned to the same New York theatre to perform on Late Show with David Letterman. On 9 September 2009, EMI reissued the Beatles catalogue following a four-year digital remastering effort, releasing a music video game called The Beatles: Rock Band the same day.

McCartney's enduring fame has made him a popular choice to open new venues. In 2009, he performed three sold-out concerts at the newly built Citi Field, a venue constructed to replace Shea Stadium in Queens, New York. These performances yielded the double live album Good Evening New York City later that year.

=== 2010s ===
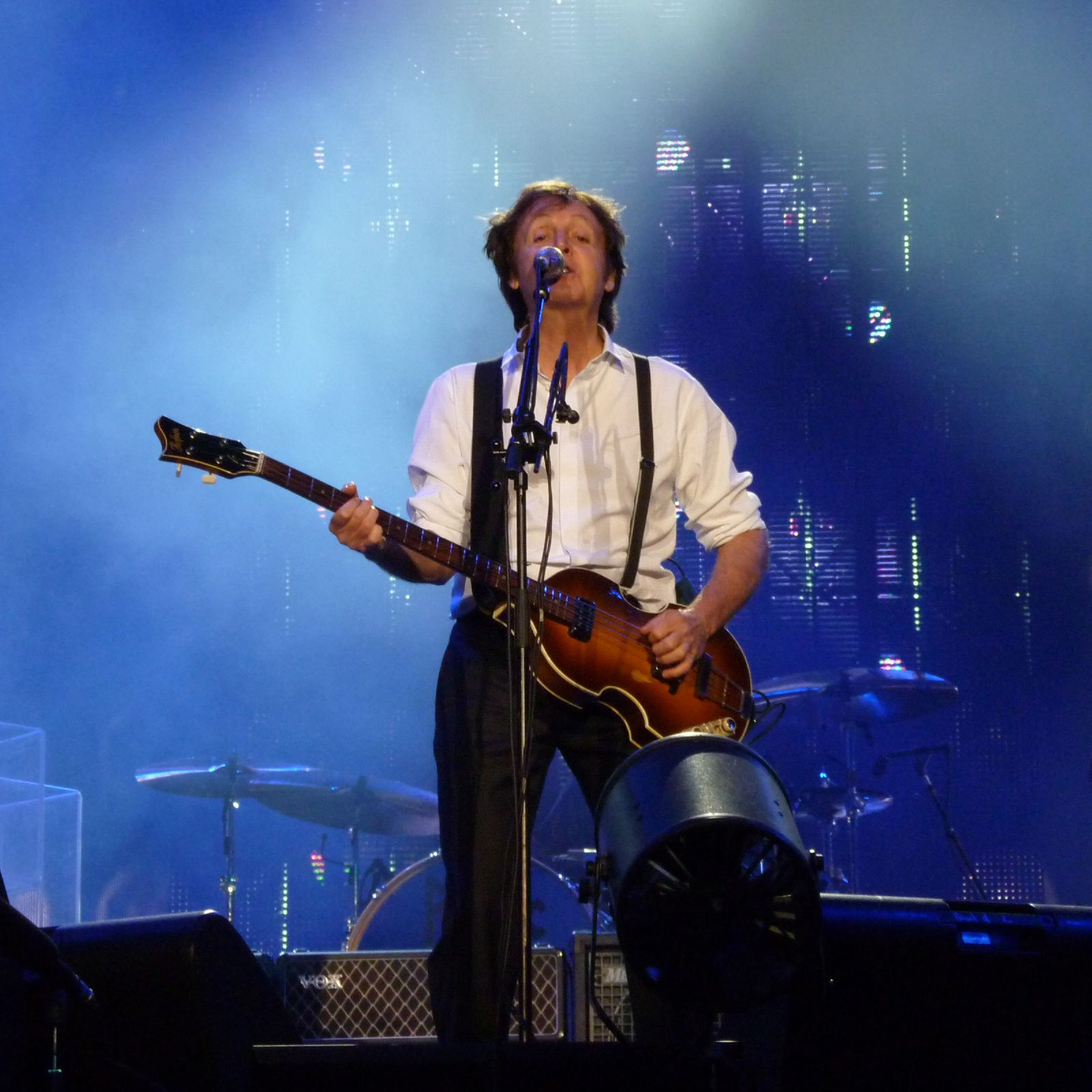
Live in Dublin, 2010

In 2010, McCartney opened the Consol Energy Center in Pittsburgh, Pennsylvania; it was his first concert in Pittsburgh since 1990 due to the old Civic Arena being deemed unsuitable for McCartney's logistical needs. (Note: In November 2010, iTunes made available the official canon of thirteen Beatles studio albums, Past Masters and the 1962–1966 and 1967–1970 greatest-hits compilations, making the group among the last of the seminal classic rock artists to offer their music for sale on the digital marketplace.) In July 2011, McCartney performed at two sold-out concerts at the new Yankee Stadium. A New York Times review of the first concert reported that McCartney was "not saying goodbye but touring stadiums and playing marathon concerts". In August 2011, McCartney left EMI and signed with Decca Records, the same record company that famously rejected the Beatles back in January 1962. McCartney was commissioned by the New York City Ballet, and in September 2011, he released his first score for dance, a collaboration with Peter Martins called Ocean's Kingdom on Decca Records. Also in 2011, McCartney married Nancy Shevell. He released Kisses on the Bottom, a collection of standards, in February 2012, the same month that the National Academy of Recording Arts and Sciences honoured him as the MusiCares Person of the Year, two days prior to his performance at the 54th Annual Grammy Awards.

McCartney remains one of the world's top draws. He played to over 100,000 people during two performances in Mexico City in May, with the shows grossing nearly $6 million. (Note: McCartney's band performed thirty-seven songs during 8 May 2012, performance in Mexico City, twenty-three of which were Beatles tracks.) In June 2012, McCartney closed Queen Elizabeth's Diamond Jubilee Concert held outside Buckingham Palace, performing a set that included "Let It Be" and "Live and Let Die". He closed the opening ceremony of the 2012 Summer Olympics in London on 27 July, singing "The End" and "Hey Jude" and inviting the audience to join in on the coda. Having donated his time, he received £1 from the Olympic organisers.

On 12 December 2012, McCartney performed with three former members of Nirvana (Krist Novoselic, Dave Grohl, and guest member Pat Smear) during the closing act of 12-12-12: The Concert for Sandy Relief, seen by approximately two billion people worldwide. On 28 August 2013, McCartney released the title track of his upcoming studio album New, which came out in October 2013. A primetime entertainment special was taped on 27 January 2014 at the Ed Sullivan Theater with a 9 February 2014 CBS airing. The show featured McCartney and Ringo Starr, and celebrated the legacy of the Beatles and their groundbreaking 1964 performance on The Ed Sullivan Show. The show, titled The Night That Changed America: A Grammy Salute to The Beatles, featured 22 classic Beatles songs as performed by various artists, including McCartney and Starr.

In May 2014, McCartney cancelled a sold-out tour of Japan and postponed a US tour to October due to begin that month after he contracted a virus. He resumed the tour with a high-energy three-hour appearance in Albany, New York, on 5 July 2014. On 14 August 2014, McCartney performed in the final concert at Candlestick Park in San Francisco, California before its demolition; this was the same venue at which the Beatles played their final concert for a paying audience in 1966. In 2014, McCartney wrote and performed "Hope for the Future", the ending song for the video game Destiny. In November 2014, a 42-song tribute album titled The Art of McCartney was released, which features a wide range of artists covering McCartney's solo and Beatles work. Also that year, McCartney collaborated with American rapper Kanye West on the single "Only One", released on 31 December. In January 2015, McCartney collaborated with West and Barbadian singer Rihanna on the single "FourFiveSeconds". They released a music video for the song in January and performed it live at the 57th Annual Grammy Awards on 8 February 2015. McCartney featured on West's 2015 single "All Day", which also features Theophilus London and Allan Kingdom.

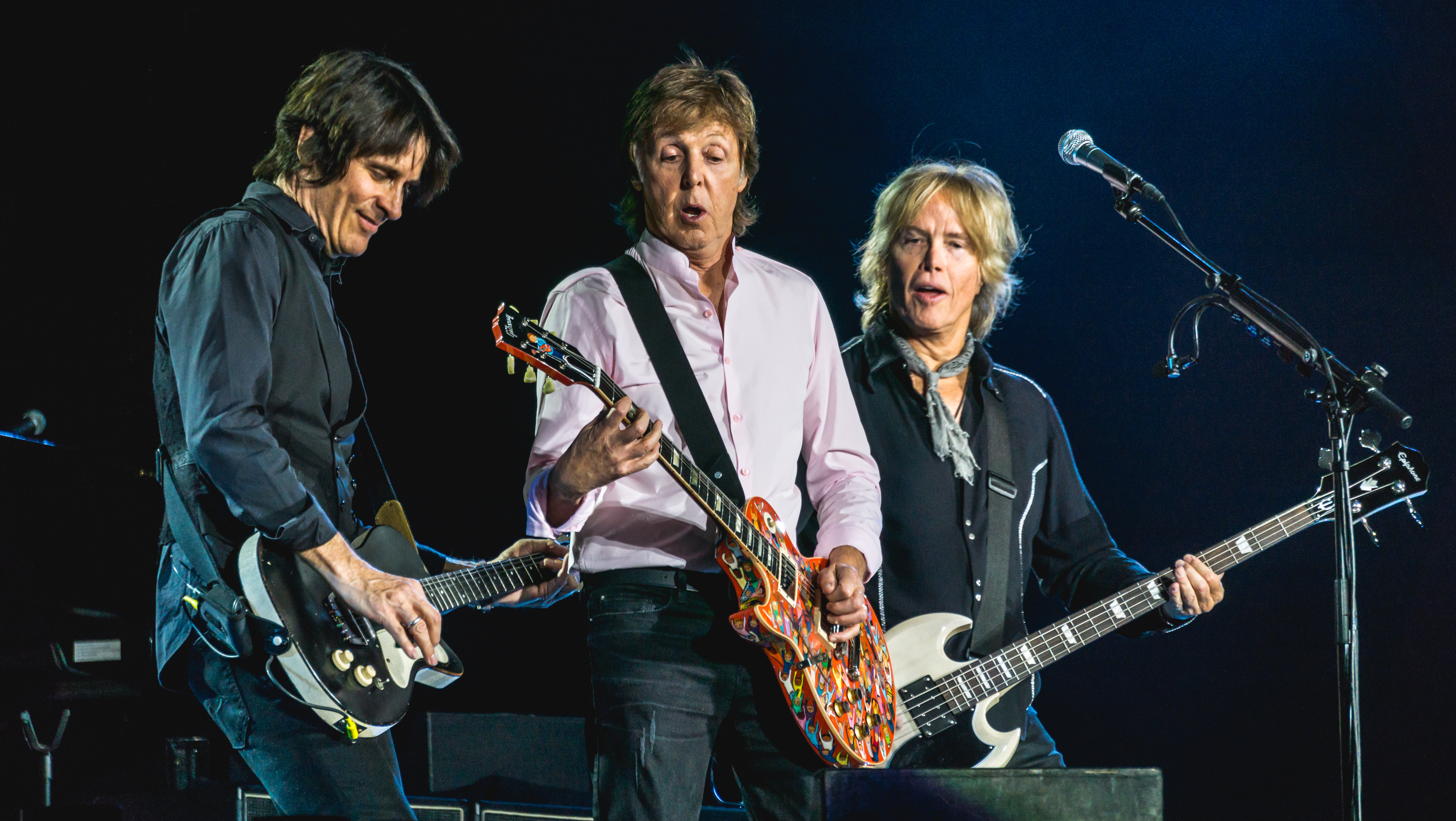
McCartney performing with his band at Desert Trip in October 2016

In February 2015, McCartney performed with Paul Simon for the Saturday Night Live 40th Anniversary Special. McCartney and Simon performed the first verse of "I've Just Seen a Face" on acoustic guitars, and McCartney later performed "Maybe I'm Amazed". McCartney shared lead vocals on the Alice Cooper-led Hollywood Vampires supergroup's cover of his song "Come and Get It", which appears on their debut album, released on 11 September 2015. On 10 June 2016, McCartney released the career-spanning collection Pure McCartney. The set includes songs from throughout McCartney's solo career and his work with Wings and the Fireman, and is available in three different formats (2-CD, 4-CD, 4-LP and Digital). The 4-CD version includes 67 tracks, most of which were top-40 hits. McCartney appeared in the 2017 adventure film Pirates of the Caribbean: Dead Men Tell No Tales, in a cameo role as Uncle Jack.

In January 2017, McCartney filed a suit in United States district court against Sony/ATV Music Publishing seeking to reclaim ownership of his share of the Lennon–McCartney song catalogue beginning in 2018. Under US copyright law, for works published before 1978 the author can reclaim copyrights assigned to a publisher after 56 years. McCartney and Sony agreed to a confidential settlement in June 2017. On 20 June 2018, McCartney released "I Don't Know" and "Come On to Me" from his album Egypt Station, which was released on 7 September through Capitol Records. Egypt Station became McCartney's first album in 36 years to top the Billboard 200, and his first to debut at number one. On 26 July 2018, McCartney played at The Cavern Club, with his regular band of Anderson, Ray, Wickens and Abe Laboriel Jr. The gig was filmed and later broadcast by BBC, on Christmas Day 2020, as Paul McCartney at the Cavern Club.

=== 2020s ===
McCartney's 19th solo album, McCartney III, was released on 18 December 2020, via Capitol Records; it became his first number-one solo album in the UK since Flowers in the Dirt in 1989. The album was recorded in England during the COVID-19 lockdowns and continues McCartney's trend of self-titled solo albums with him playing all of the instruments. An album of "reinterpretations, remixes, and covers" titled McCartney III Imagined was released on 16 April 2021.

McCartney's book The Lyrics: 1956 to the Present was released in November 2021. Described as a "self-portrait in 154 songs", the book is based on conversations McCartney had with the Irish poet Paul Muldoon. The Lyrics was named Book of the Year by both Barnes & Noble and Waterstones. McCartney's "Got Back" tour ran from 28 April 2022 to 16 June 2022 in the United States, his first in the country since 2019. The tour concluded on 25 June 2022 when McCartney headlined Glastonbury Festival, a week after his 80th birthday. Performing on the Pyramid Stage, he became the oldest solo headliner at the festival. Special guests were Dave Grohl and Bruce Springsteen. In 2022, he received the Primetime Emmy Award for Outstanding Documentary or Nonfiction Series at the 74th Primetime Creative Arts Emmy Awards, as a producer for the documentary The Beatles: Get Back.

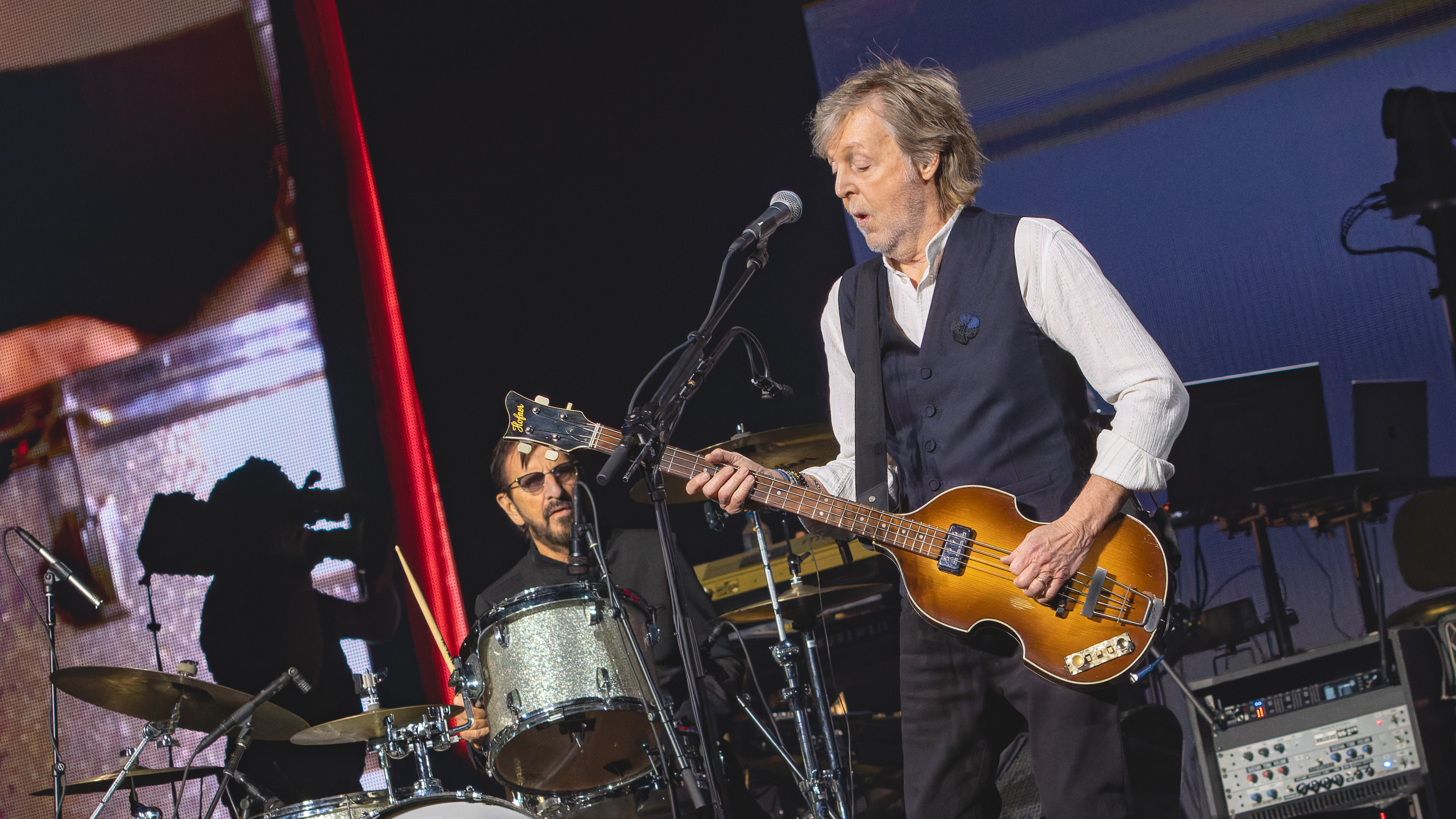
McCartney and Ringo Starr performing together in London, 2024

In 2023, McCartney published the book 1964: Eyes of the Storm, a collection of recently discovered photos he had taken at the height of Beatlemania. The book was published in conjunction with an exhibition of his photographs titled, "Paul McCartney Photographs 1963–64: Eyes of the Storm." The exhibit was organised by the National Portrait Gallery, London, in collaboration with McCartney and appeared in numerous venues in the United States and Japan with additional appearances in France and Canada.

In February 2025, McCartney performed for the Saturday Night Live 50th Anniversary Special. Backed by his touring band, McCartney performed "Golden Slumbers", "Carry That Weight", and "The End" in medley form to close out the anniversary special. In May 2025, he released a new version of "My Valentine", recorded as a duet with Barbra Streisand for her album The Secret of Life: Partners, Volume Two. In November 2025, McCartney released his first new recording in five years, a nearly silent track as part of a protest against AI companies using musicians' work without permission to train their models. The piece appears on the B-side of a protest LP called Is This What We Want?, made up of similarly quiet recordings. Across about two minutes and forty-five seconds, it is mostly a quiet hiss with brief clatters and fades, symbolising a future in which original music is "silenced" if artists' rights are not protected. The tracks message is "the British government must not legalise music theft to benefit AI companies." The project is organised by composer Ed Newton-Rex and is backed by major artists including Sam Fender, Kate Bush, Hans Zimmer and the Pet Shop Boys. McCartney has warned that unchecked AI risks destroying career paths for young composers and songwriters and the future of original music.

On 26 March 2026, McCartney released the single "Days We Left Behind" from his twentieth solo studio album, The Boys of Dungeon Lane, which was released on 29 May. McCartney performed on 16 May 2026 season finale of Saturday Night Live. McCartney, who was joined on drums by Chad Smith of the Red Hot Chili Peppers and backing singer Ingrid Michaelson, performed "Days We Left Behind" (its live debut), "Band on the Run" and "Coming Up", a song he had previously performed forty-six years earlier on his first appearance on Saturday Night Live. "Help!" and "Drive My Car" (featuring Will Ferrell on cowbell) were also performed but not shown on television. He also made an appearance in the opening monologue with host Ferrell and Smith along with appearing in another sketch later in the episode. On 21 May 2026, McCartney was the final guest on The Late Show with Stephen Colbert, filmed at the Ed Sullivan Theater.

In July 2026, McCartney performed privately during the wedding reception of Taylor Swift and Travis Kelce. His set included the Beatles' song "I Want to Hold Your Hand", marking his first time playing it live since September 1964, during the Beatles' first North American tour. McCartney appears on the Rolling Stones's Foreign Tongues (2026).

== Musicianship ==
McCartney is a largely self-taught musician, and his approach was described by musicologist Ian MacDonald as "by nature drawn to music's formal aspects yet wholly untutored [...] [he] produced technically 'finished' work almost entirely by instinct, his harmonic judgement based mainly on perfect pitch and an acute pair of ears [...] [A] natural melodist—a creator of tunes capable of existing apart from their harmony." McCartney likened his approach to "the primitive cave artists, who drew without training".

=== Early influences ===
The Messiah has arrived!

— McCartney on Elvis Presley, The Beatles Anthology, 2000

McCartney's earliest musical influences include Elvis Presley, Little Richard, Buddy Holly, Carl Perkins, and Chuck Berry. When asked why the Beatles did not include Presley on the Sgt. Pepper cover, McCartney replied, "Elvis was too important and too far above the rest even to mention [...] so we didn't put him on the list because he was more than merely a [...] pop singer, he was Elvis the King." McCartney stated that in his bassline for "I Saw Her Standing There", he quoted Berry's "I'm Talking About You".

McCartney called Little Richard an idol, whose falsetto vocalisations inspired McCartney's own vocal technique. McCartney said he wrote "I'm Down" as a vehicle for his Little Richard impersonation. In 1971, McCartney bought the publishing rights to Holly's catalogue, and in 1976, on the fortieth anniversary of Holly's birth, McCartney inaugurated the annual "Buddy Holly Week" in England. The festival has included guest performances by famous musicians, songwriting competitions, drawing contests and special events featuring performances by the Crickets.

=== Bass guitar ===
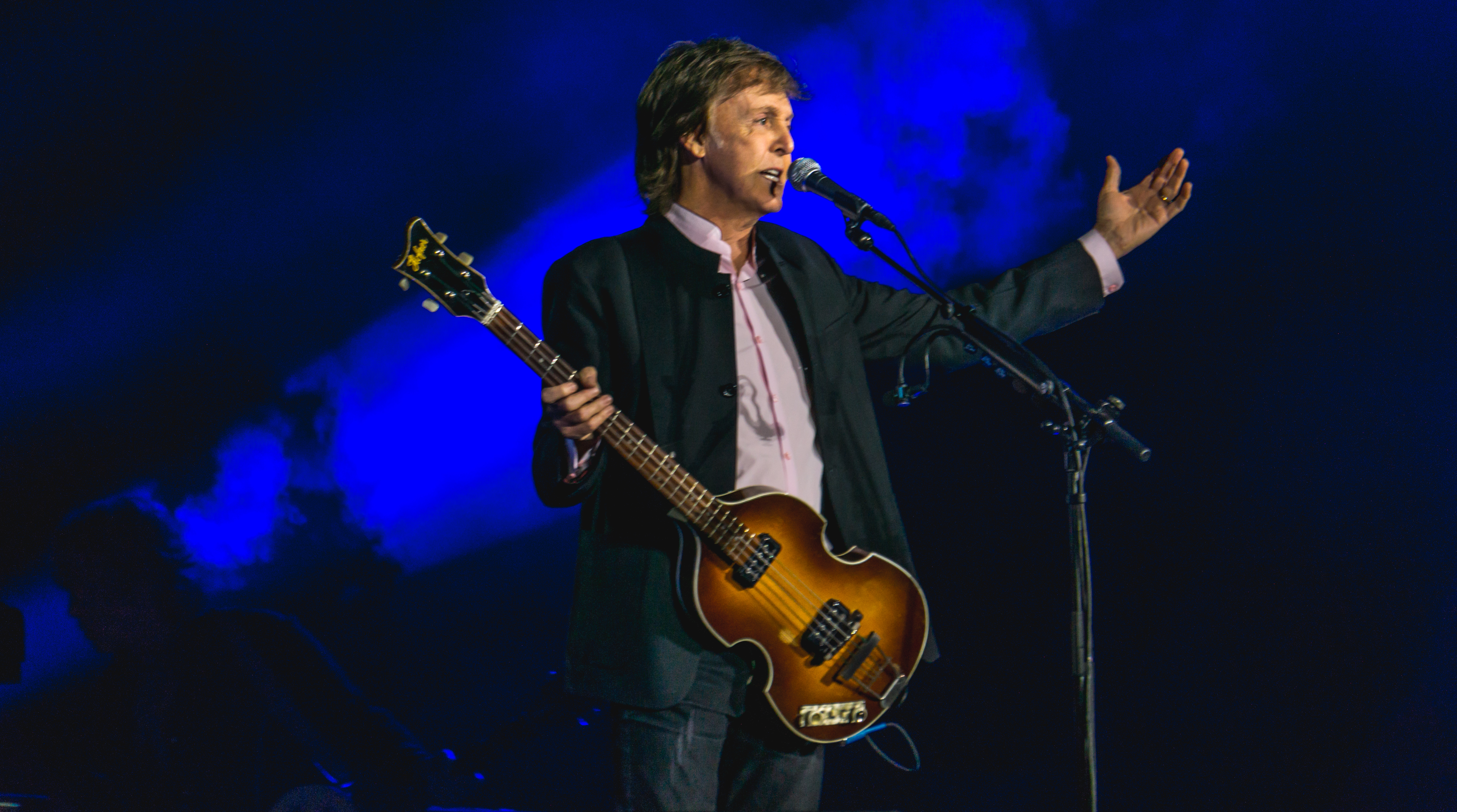
McCartney using a Höfner 500/1 bass in 2016

While best known for primarily using a plectrum or pick, McCartney occasionally plays fingerstyle. He was strongly influenced by Motown artists, in particular James Jamerson, whom McCartney called a hero for his melodic style. He was also influenced by Brian Wilson, as he commented: "because he went to very unusual places". Another favourite bassist of his is Stanley Clarke. McCartney's skill as a bass player has been acknowledged by bassists including Sting, Dr. Dre bassist Mike Elizondo, and Colin Moulding of XTC.

McCartney has consistently been ranked at or near the top of lists of the best bass players ever. He was voted the best rock bassist in Creem's 1973 and 1974 Reader Poll Results and the third best rock bassist in its 1975 and 1977 Reader Poll Results. He was voted the third best bassist of all time in a 2011 Rolling Stone readers' poll and, in 2020, Rolling Stone ranked him the ninth greatest bassist of all time. In 2020, Bass Player ranked him the third best bass player of all time. He was voted the fifth greatest bassist of all time in a 2021 MusicRadar readers' poll. Music critic J. D. Considine ranked McCartney the second best bass player.

Paul is one of the most innovative bass players [...] half the stuff that's going on now is directly ripped off from his Beatles period [...] He's an egomaniac about everything else, but his bass playing he'd always been a bit coy about.

— Lennon, Playboy magazine published in January 1981

During McCartney's early years with the Beatles, he primarily used a Höfner 500/1 bass, although from 1965, he favoured his Rickenbacker 4001S for recording. While typically using Vox amplifiers, by 1967, he had also begun using a Fender Bassman for amplification. During the late 1980s and early 1990s, he used a Wal 5-String, which he said made him play more thick-sounding basslines, in contrast to the much lighter Höfner, which inspired him to play more sensitively, something he considers fundamental to his playing style. He changed back to the Höfner around 1990 for that reason. He uses Mesa Boogie bass amplifiers while performing live.

MacDonald identified "She's a Woman" as the turning point when McCartney's bass playing began to evolve dramatically, and Beatles biographer Chris Ingham singled out Rubber Soul as the moment when McCartney's playing exhibited significant progress, particularly on "The Word". Bacon and Morgan agreed, calling McCartney's groove on the track "a high point in pop bass playing and [...] the first proof on a recording of his serious technical ability on the instrument." MacDonald inferred the influence of James Brown's "Papa's Got a Brand New Bag" and Wilson Pickett's "In the Midnight Hour", American soul tracks from which McCartney absorbed elements and drew inspiration as he "delivered his most spontaneous bass-part to date".

Bacon and Morgan described his bassline for the Beatles song "Rain" as "an astonishing piece of playing [...] [McCartney] thinking in terms of both rhythm and 'lead bass' [...] [choosing] the area of the neck [...] he correctly perceives will give him clarity for melody without rendering his sound too thin for groove." MacDonald identified the influence of Indian classical music in "exotic melismas in the bass part" on "Rain" and described the playing as "so inventive that it threatens to overwhelm the track". By contrast, he recognised McCartney's bass part on the Harrison-composed "Something" as creative but overly busy and "too fussily extemporised". McCartney identified Sgt. Pepper's Lonely Hearts Club Band as containing his strongest and most inventive bass playing, particularly on "Lucy in the Sky with Diamonds".

=== Acoustic guitar ===
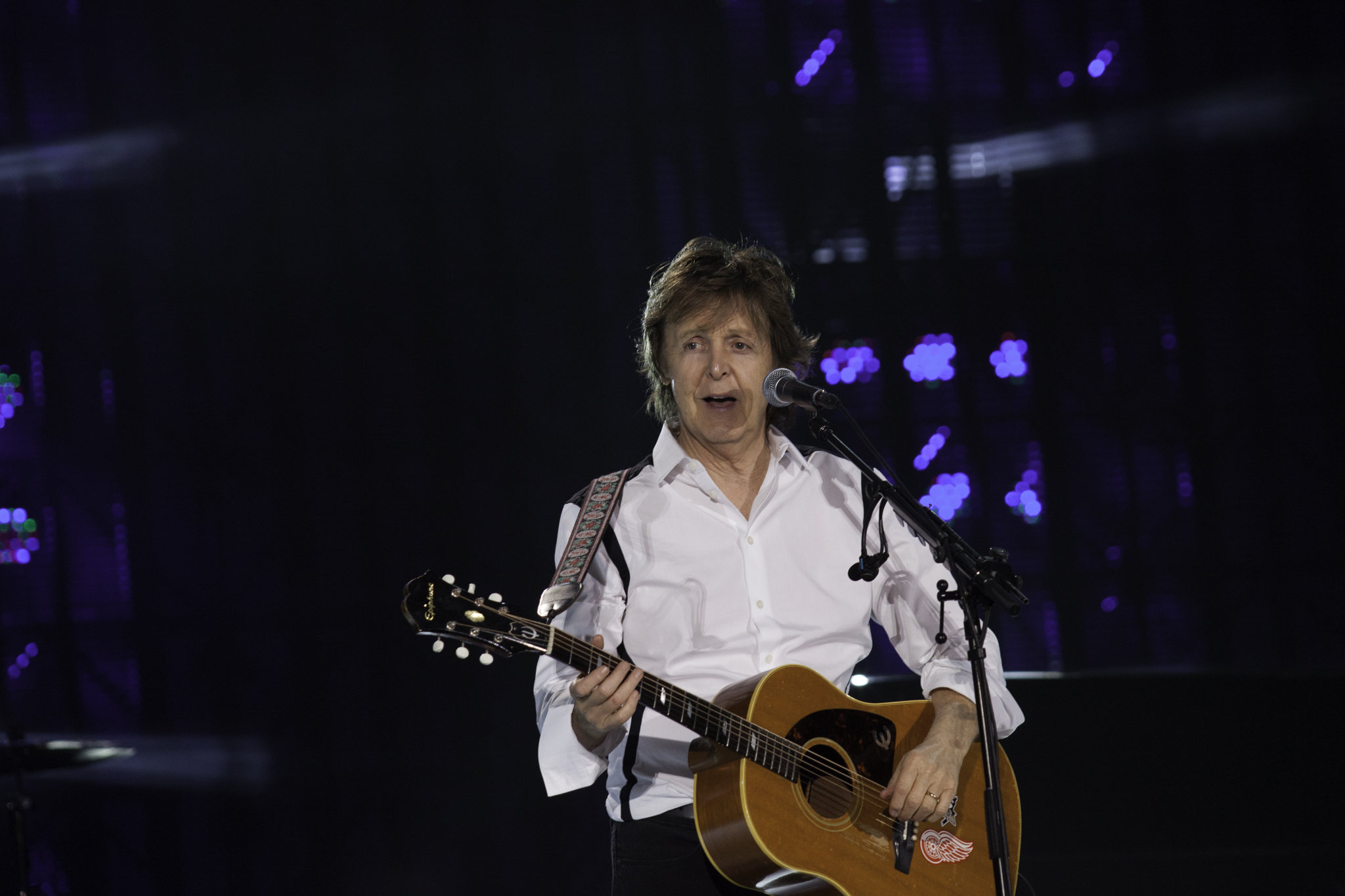
McCartney playing an Epiphone Texan in 2014

If I couldn't have any other instrument, I would have to have an acoustic guitar.

— McCartney, Guitar Player, July 1990

McCartney primarily flatpicks while playing acoustic guitar, though he also uses elements of fingerpicking. Examples of his acoustic guitar playing on Beatles tracks include "Yesterday", "Michelle", "Blackbird", "I Will", "Mother Nature's Son" and "Rocky Raccoon". McCartney singled out "Blackbird" as a personal favourite and described his technique for the guitar part in the following way: "I got my own little sort of cheating way of [fingerpicking] [...] I'm actually sort of pulling two strings at a time [...] I was trying to emulate those folk players." He employed a similar technique for "Jenny Wren". He played an Epiphone Texan on many of his acoustic recordings, but also used a Martin D-28.

=== Electric guitar ===
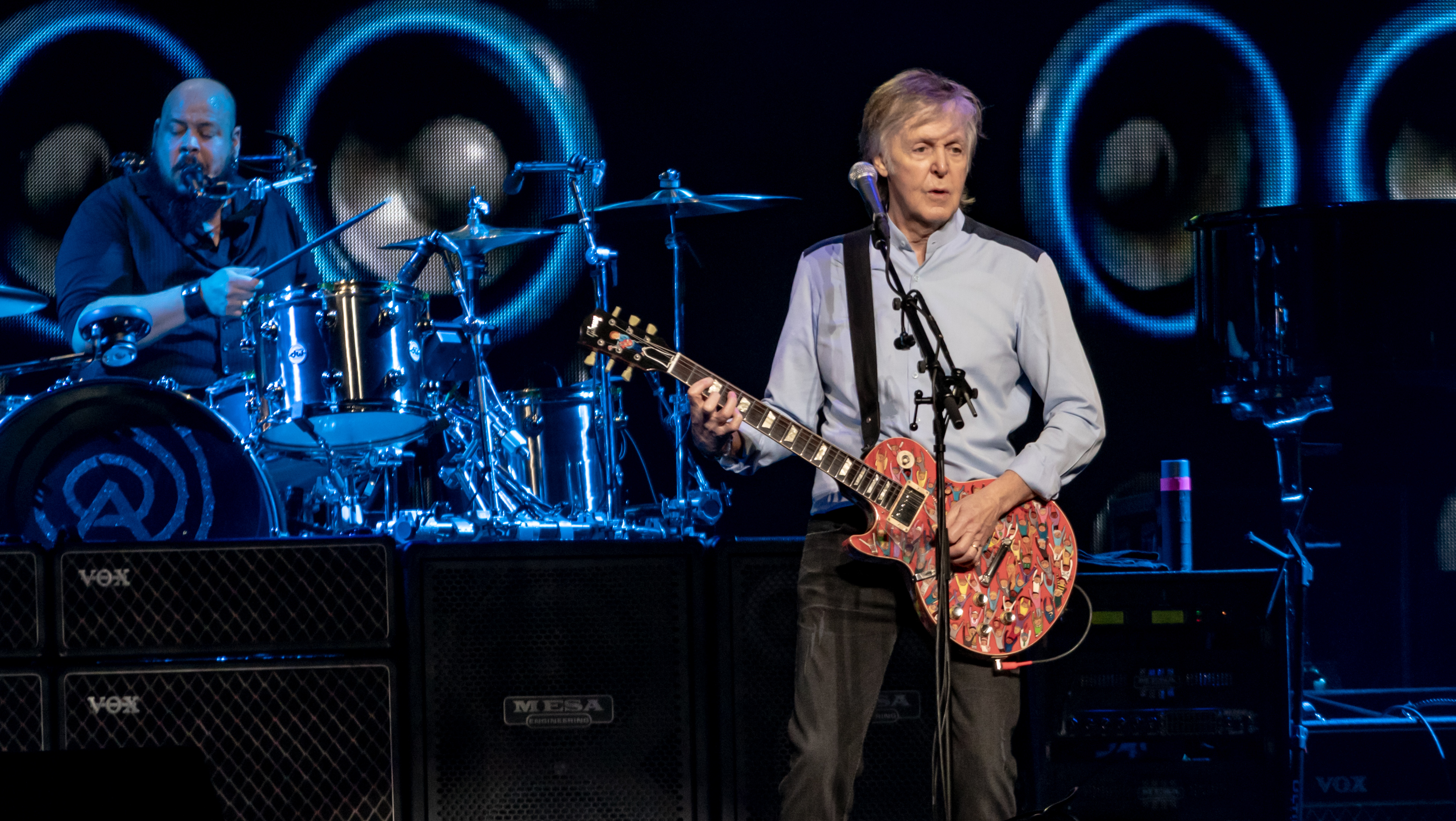
McCartney playing a Gibson Les Paul in concert, 2018

McCartney played lead guitar on several Beatles recordings, including what MacDonald described as a "fiercely angular slide guitar solo" on "Drive My Car", which McCartney played on an Epiphone Casino. McCartney said of the instrument: "if I had to pick one electric guitar it would be this." McCartney bought the Casino in 1964, on the knowledge that the guitar's hollow body would produce more feedback. He has retained that original guitar to the present day. He contributed what MacDonald described as "a startling guitar solo" on the Harrison composition "Taxman" and the "shrieking" guitar on "Sgt. Pepper's Lonely Hearts Club Band" and "Helter Skelter". MacDonald also praised McCartney's "coruscating pseudo-Indian" guitar solo on "Good Morning Good Morning". McCartney also played lead guitar on "Another Girl".

Linda was a big fan of my guitar playing, whereas I've got my doubts. I think there are proper guitar players and then there are guys like me who love playing it.

— McCartney, Guitar Player, July 1990

During his years with Wings, McCartney tended to leave electric guitar work to other group members, though he played most of the lead guitar on Band on the Run. In 1990, when asked who his favourite guitar players were he included Eddie Van Halen, Eric Clapton and David Gilmour, stating, "but I still like Hendrix the best". He has primarily used a Gibson Les Paul for electric work, particularly during live performances.

In addition to these guitars, McCartney is known to use and own a range of other electric guitars, usually favouring the Fender Esquire and its subsequent incarnation, the Fender Telecaster, using the latter with a sunburst finish on Wings' tours in the 1970s. He also owns a rare Ampeg Dan Armstrong Plexi guitar, the only left handed one known to be in existence, which appeared in the Wings video for "Helen Wheels".

=== Vocals ===
McCartney is known for his belting power, versatility and wide tenor vocal range, spanning over four octaves. He was ranked the 11th greatest singer of all time by Rolling Stone, voted the 8th greatest singer ever by NME readers and number 10 by Music Radar readers in the list of "the 30 greatest lead singers of all time". Over the years, McCartney has been named a significant vocal influence by Chris Cornell, Billy Joel, Steven Tyler, Brad Delp, and Axl Rose.

McCartney's vocals have crossed several music genres throughout his career. On "Call Me Back Again", according to Benitez, "McCartney shines as a bluesy solo vocalist", while MacDonald called "I'm Down" "a rock-and-roll classic" that "illustrates McCartney's vocal and stylistic versatility". MacDonald described "Helter Skelter" as an early attempt at heavy metal, and "Hey Jude" as a "pop/rock hybrid", pointing out McCartney's "use of gospel-style melismas" in the song and his "pseudo-soul shrieking in the fade-out". Benitez identified "Hope of Deliverance" and "Put It There" as examples of McCartney's folk music efforts while musicologist Walter Everett considered "When I'm Sixty-Four" and "Honey Pie" attempts at vaudeville. MacDonald praised the "swinging beat" of the Beatles' twenty-four bar blues song, "She's a Woman" as "the most extreme sound they had manufactured to date", with McCartney's voice "at the edge, squeezed to the upper limit of his chest register and threatening to crack at any moment." MacDonald described "I've Got a Feeling" as a "raunchy, mid-tempo rocker" with a "robust and soulful" vocal performance and "Back in the U.S.S.R." as "the last of [the Beatles'] up-tempo rockers", McCartney's "belting" vocals among his best since "Drive My Car", recorded three years earlier.

McCartney also teasingly tried out classical singing, namely singing various renditions of "Besame Mucho" with the Beatles. He continued experimenting with various musical and vocal styles throughout his post-Beatles career. "Monkberry Moon Delight" was described by Pitchfork's Jayson Greene as "an absolutely unhinged vocal take, Paul gulping and sobbing right next to your inner ear", adding that "it could be a latter-day Tom Waits performance".

=== Keyboards ===
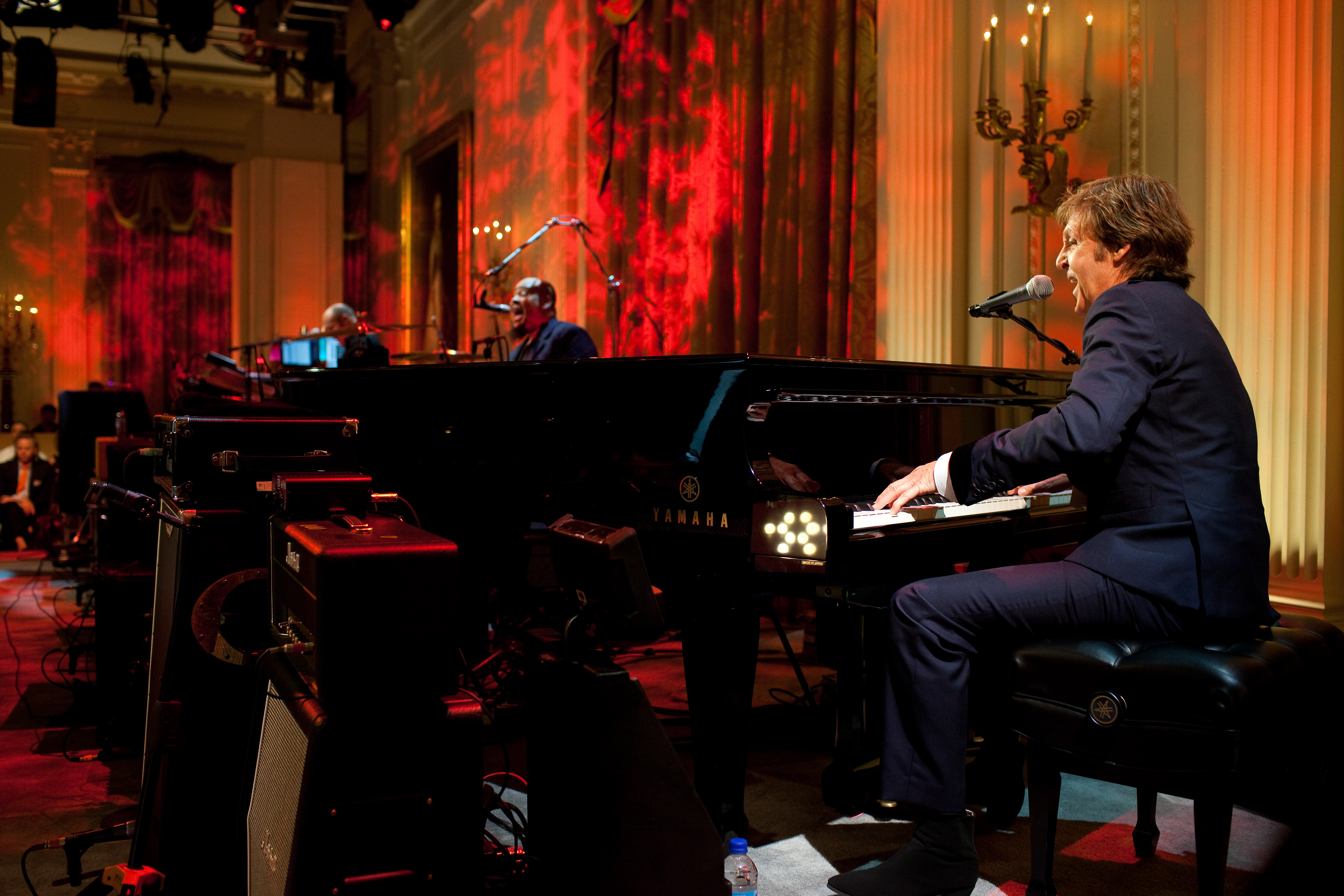
Paul McCartney performing in the East Room of the White House, 2010

McCartney played piano on several Beatles songs, including "She's a Woman", "For No One", "A Day in the Life", "Hello, Goodbye", "Lady Madonna", "Hey Jude", "Martha My Dear", "Let It Be" and "The Long and Winding Road". MacDonald considered the piano part in "Lady Madonna" as reminiscent of Fats Domino, and "Let It Be" as having a gospel rhythm. MacDonald called McCartney's Mellotron intro on "Strawberry Fields Forever" an integral feature of the song's character. McCartney played a Moog synthesiser on the Beatles song "Maxwell's Silver Hammer" and the Wings track "Loup (1st Indian on the Moon)". Ingham described the Wings songs "With a Little Luck" and "London Town" as being "full of the most sensitive pop synthesizer touches".

=== Drums ===
McCartney played drums on the Beatles' songs "Back in the U.S.S.R.", "Dear Prudence", "Martha My Dear", "Wild Honey Pie" and "The Ballad of John and Yoko". He also played all the drum parts on his albums McCartney, McCartney II and McCartney III, as well as on Wings' Band on the Run, and most of the drums on his solo LP Chaos and Creation in the Backyard. His other drumming contributions include Paul Jones' rendition of "And the Sun Will Shine" (1968), Steve Miller Band's 1969 tracks "Celebration Song" and "My Dark Hour", and "Sunday Rain" from the Foo Fighters' 2017 album Concrete and Gold.

=== Tape loops ===
In the mid-1960s, when visiting artist friend John Dunbar's flat in London, McCartney brought tapes he had compiled at then-girlfriend Jane Asher's home. They included mixes of various songs, musical pieces and comments made by McCartney that Dick James made into a demo for him. Heavily influenced by American avant-garde musician John Cage, McCartney made tape loops by recording voices, guitars and bongos on a Brenell tape recorder and splicing the various loops. He referred to the finished product as "electronic symphonies". He reversed the tapes, sped them up, and slowed them down to create the desired effects, some of which the Beatles later used on the songs "Tomorrow Never Knows" and "The Fool on the Hill".

=== Trumpet ===
McCartney's first instrument was the trumpet, given to him by his trumpet-playing father. McCartney took to the instrument, but realized he couldn't sing with the mouthpiece in. He asked his father if he could trade it for a guitar, which he did. McCartney only occasionally played the trumpet on recordings, such as on "Only a Northern Song". At a 2009 Preservation Hall Jazz Band benefit, he joined their jazz band on trumpet for "When the Saints Go Marching In." During the 2026 The Late Show with Stephen Colbert finale, McCartney joined Louis Cato and the Great Big Joy Machine playing trumpet on the same song.

== Personal life ==
=== Creative outlets ===
While at school during the 1950s, McCartney thrived at art assignments, often earning top accolades for his visual work. However, his lack of discipline negatively affected his academic grades, preventing him from earning admission to art college. During the 1960s, he delved into the visual arts, explored experimental cinema, and regularly attended film, theatrical and classical music performances. His first contact with the London avant-garde scene was through artist John Dunbar, who introduced McCartney to art dealer Robert Fraser. At Fraser's flat he first learned about art appreciation and met Andy Warhol, Claes Oldenburg, Peter Blake, and Richard Hamilton. McCartney later purchased works by Magritte, whose painting of an apple had inspired the Apple Records logo. McCartney became involved in the renovation and publicising of the Indica Gallery in Mason's Yard, London, which Barry Miles had co-founded and where Lennon first met Yoko Ono. Miles also co-founded International Times, an underground paper that McCartney helped to start with direct financial support and by providing interviews to attract advertiser income. Miles later wrote McCartney's official biography, Many Years from Now (1997).

McCartney became interested in painting after watching artist Willem de Kooning work in de Kooning's Long Island studio. McCartney took up painting in 1983, and he first exhibited his work in Siegen, Germany, in 1999. The 70-painting show featured portraits of Lennon, Andy Warhol, and David Bowie. Though initially reluctant to display his paintings publicly, McCartney chose the gallery because events organiser Wolfgang Suttner showed genuine interest in McCartney's art. In September 2000, the first UK exhibition of McCartney's paintings opened, featuring 500 canvases at the Arnolfini Gallery in Bristol, England. In October 2000, McCartney's art debuted in his hometown of Liverpool. McCartney said, "I've been offered an exhibition of my paintings at the Walker Art Gallery [...] where John and I used to spend many a pleasant afternoon. So I'm really excited about it. I didn't tell anybody I painted for 15 years but now I'm out of the closet". McCartney is lead patron of the Liverpool Institute for Performing Arts, a school in the building formerly occupied by the Liverpool Institute for Boys.

When McCartney was a child, his mother read him poems and encouraged him to read books. His father invited Paul and his brother Michael to solve crosswords with him, to increase their "word power", as McCartney said. In 2001, McCartney published Blackbird Singing, a volume of poems and lyrics to his songs for which he gave readings in Liverpool and New York City. In the foreword of the book, he explains: "When I was a teenager [...] I had an overwhelming desire to have a poem published in the school magazine. I wrote something deep and meaningful—which was promptly rejected—and I suppose I have been trying to get my own back ever since". His first children's book was published by Faber & Faber in 2005, High in the Clouds: An Urban Furry Tail, a collaboration with writer Philip Ardagh and animator Geoff Dunbar. Featuring a squirrel whose woodland home is razed by developers, it had been scripted and sketched by McCartney and Dunbar over several years, as an animated film. The Observer labelled it an "anti-capitalist children's book". In 2018, he wrote the children's book Hey Grandude! together with illustrator Kathryn Durst, which was published by Random House Books in September 2019. The book is about a grandpa and his three grandchildren with a magic compass on an adventure. A follow-up, titled Grandude's Green Submarine, was released in September 2021.

I think there's an urge in us to stop the terrible fleetingness of time. Music. Paintings [...] Try and capture one bloody moment please.

— McCartney

In 1981, McCartney asked Geoff Dunbar to direct a short animated film called Rupert and the Frog Song; McCartney was the writer and producer, and he also added some of the character voices. His song "We All Stand Together" from the film's soundtrack reached No. 3 in the UK Singles Chart. In 1992, he worked with Dunbar on an animated film about the work of French artist Honoré Daumier, which won them a BAFTA award. In 2004, they worked together on the animated short film Tropic Island Hum. The accompanying single, "Tropic Island Hum"/"We All Stand Together", reached number 21 in the UK.

McCartney also produced and hosted The Real Buddy Holly Story, a 1985 documentary featuring interviews with Keith Richards, Phil and Don Everly, the Holly family, and others. In 1995, he directed a short documentary about the Grateful Dead. He was the guest on the last episode of The Late Show With Stephen Colbert. He joined Elvis Costello, Jon Batiste and Colbert for a performance of the Beatles's "Hello, Goodbye".

=== Business ===
Since the Rich List began in 1989, McCartney has been the UK's wealthiest musician, with an estimated fortune of £1 billion in 2024. In addition to an interest in Apple Corps and MPL Communications, an umbrella company for his business interests, he owns a significant music publishing catalogue, with access to over 25,000 copyrights, including the publishing rights to the musicals Guys and Dolls, A Chorus Line, Annie and Grease. He earned £40 million in 2003, the highest income that year within media professions in the UK. This rose to £48.5 million by 2005. McCartney's 18-date On the Run Tour grossed £37 million in 2012.

McCartney signed his first recording contract, as a member of the Beatles, with Parlophone Records, an EMI subsidiary, in June 1962. In the United States, the Beatles recordings were distributed by EMI subsidiary Capitol Records. The Beatles re-signed with EMI for another nine years in 1967. After forming their own record label, Apple Records, in 1968, the Beatles' recordings would be released through Apple although the masters were still owned by EMI. Following the break-up of the Beatles, McCartney's music continued to be released by Apple Records under the Beatles' 1967 recording contract with EMI which ran until 1976. Following the formal dissolution of the Beatles' partnership in 1975, McCartney re-signed with EMI worldwide and Capitol in the US, Canada and Japan, acquiring ownership of his solo catalogue from EMI as part of the deal. In 1979, McCartney signed with Columbia Records in the US and Canada—reportedly receiving the industry's most lucrative recording contract to date, while remaining with EMI for distribution throughout the rest of the world. As part of the deal, CBS offered McCartney ownership of Frank Music, publisher of the catalogue of American songwriter Frank Loesser. McCartney's album sales were below CBS' expectations and reportedly the company lost at least $9 million on the contract. McCartney returned to Capitol in the US in 1985, remaining with EMI until 2006. In 2007, McCartney signed with Hear Music, becoming the label's first artist. He returned to Capitol for 2018's Egypt Station.

In 1963, Dick James established Northern Songs to publish the songs of Lennon–McCartney. McCartney initially owned 20% of Northern Songs, which became 15% after a public stock offering in 1965. In 1969, James sold a controlling interest in Northern Songs to Lew Grade's Associated Television (ATV) after which McCartney and John Lennon sold their remaining shares although they remained under contract to ATV until 1973. In 1972, McCartney re-signed with ATV for seven years in a joint publishing agreement between ATV and McCartney Music. Since 1979, MPL Communications has published McCartney's songs.

McCartney and Yoko Ono attempted to purchase the Northern Songs catalogue in 1981, but Grade declined their offer. Soon afterward, ATV Music's parent company, Associated Communications Corp., was acquired in a takeover by businessman Robert Holmes à Court, who later sold ATV Music to Michael Jackson in 1985. McCartney has criticised Jackson's purchase and handling of Northern Songs over the years. In 1995, Jackson merged his catalogue with Sony for a reported £59,052,000 ($95 million), establishing Sony/ATV Music Publishing, in which he retained half-ownership. Northern Songs was formally dissolved in 1995, and absorbed into the Sony/ATV catalogue. McCartney receives writers' royalties which together are 33 1/3 per cent of total commercial proceeds in the US, and which vary elsewhere between 50 and 55 per cent. Two of the Beatles' earliest songs—"Love Me Do" and "P.S. I Love You"—were published by an EMI subsidiary, Ardmore & Beechwood, before signing with James. McCartney acquired their publishing rights from Ardmore in 1978, and they are the only two Beatles songs owned by MPL Communications.

=== Drugs ===
McCartney first used drugs in the Beatles' Hamburg days when they often used Preludin to maintain their energy while performing for long periods. Bob Dylan introduced them to cannabis in a New York hotel room in 1964; McCartney recalls getting "very high" and "giggling uncontrollably". His use of the drug soon became habitual, and according to Miles, McCartney wrote the lyrics "another kind of mind" in "Got to Get You into My Life" specifically as a reference to cannabis. During the filming of Help!, McCartney occasionally smoked a joint in the car on the way to the studio, and often forgot his lines. Director Richard Lester overheard two physically attractive women trying to persuade McCartney to use heroin, but he refused. Introduced to cocaine by Robert Fraser, McCartney used the drug regularly during the recording of Sgt. Pepper's Lonely Hearts Club Band, and for about a year in total but stopped because of his dislike of the unpleasant melancholy he felt afterwards.

Initially reluctant to try LSD, McCartney eventually did so in late 1966, and took his second "acid trip" in March 1967 with Lennon after a Sgt. Pepper studio session. He later became the first Beatle to discuss the drug publicly, declaring: "It opened my eyes ... [and] made me a better, more honest, more tolerant member of society." McCartney made his attitude about cannabis public in 1967, when he, along with the other Beatles and Epstein, added his name to a July advertisement in The Times, which called for its legalisation, the release of those imprisoned for possession, and research into marijuana's medical uses. In 1972, a Swedish court fined McCartney £1,000 for cannabis possession. Soon after, Scottish police found marijuana plants growing on his farm, leading to his 1973 conviction for illegal cultivation and a £100 fine at Campbeltown Sheriff Court.

As a result of his drug convictions, the US government repeatedly denied him a visa until December 1973. Arrested again for marijuana possession in 1975 in Los Angeles, Linda took the blame, and the court soon dismissed the charges. In January 1980, when Wings flew to Tokyo for a tour of Japan, customs officials found approximately 8 ounces (230 g) of cannabis in his luggage. Years later, McCartney said, "I don't know what possessed me to just stick this bloody great bag of grass in my suitcase. Thinking back on it, it almost makes me shudder." They arrested McCartney and brought him to a local jail while the Japanese government decided what to do. After ten days, they released and deported him without charge.

In 1984, while McCartney was on holiday in Barbados, authorities arrested him for possession of marijuana and fined him $200. Upon his return to England, he stated that cannabis was less harmful than the legal substances alcohol, tobacco and glue, and that he had done no harm to anyone. In 1997, he spoke out in support of decriminalisation of cannabis: "People are smoking pot anyway and to make them criminals is wrong." McCartney quit cannabis in 2015, citing a desire to set a good example for his grandchildren.

=== Vegetarianism and activism ===
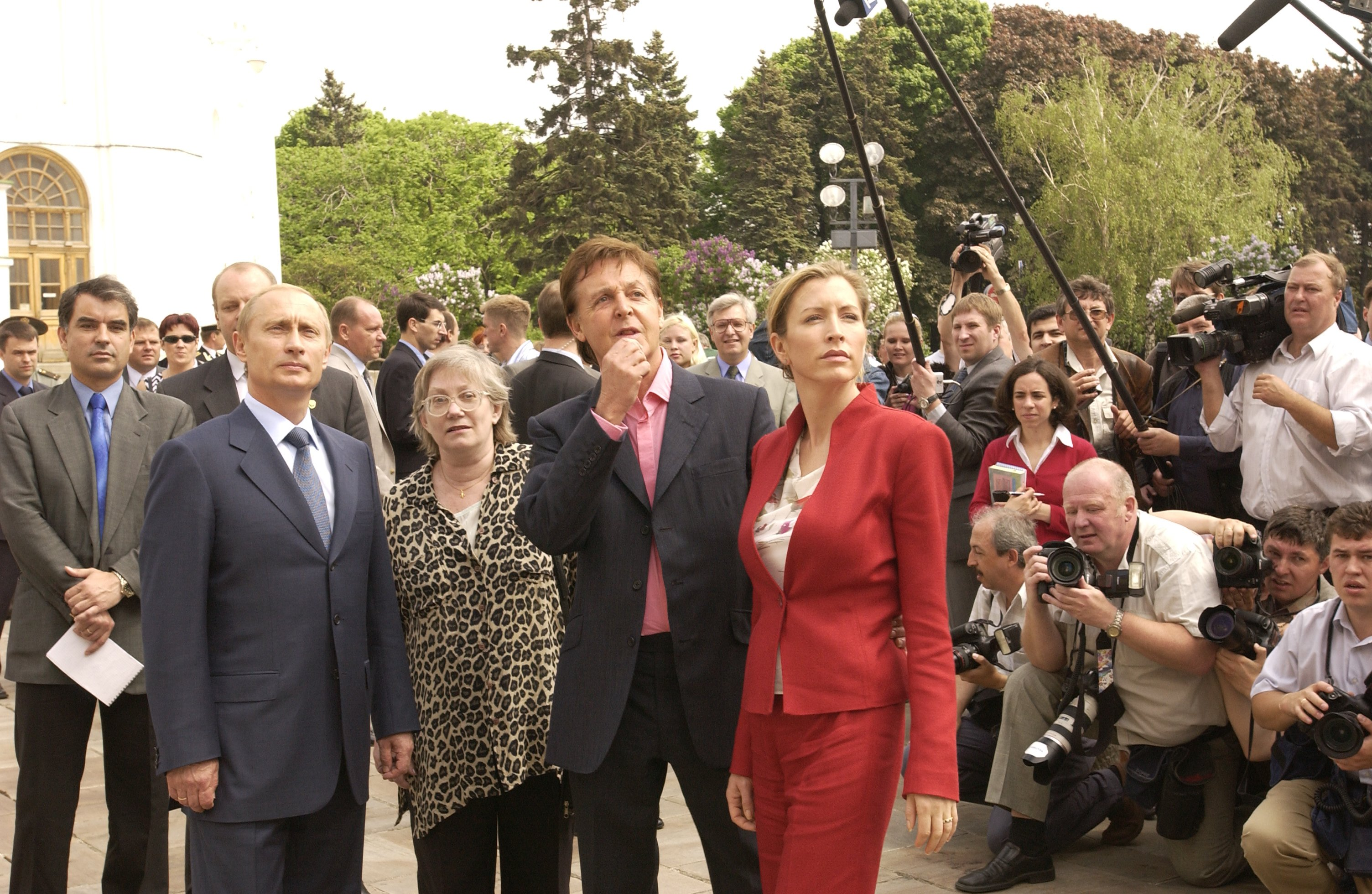
Russian president Vladimir Putin with McCartney and his then-wife Heather Mills in Moscow in 2003

Since 1975, McCartney has been a vegetarian. He and his wife Linda were vegetarians for most of their 29-year marriage. They decided to stop consuming meat after Paul saw lambs in a field as they were eating a meal of lamb. Soon after, the couple became outspoken animal rights activists. In his first interview after Linda's death, he promised to continue working for animal rights, and in 1999, he spent £3,000,000 to ensure Linda McCartney Foods remained free of genetically engineered ingredients. In 1995, he narrated the documentary Devour the Earth, written by Tony Wardle. McCartney is a supporter of the animal rights organisation People for the Ethical Treatment of Animals. He has appeared in the group's campaigns, and in 2009, McCartney narrated a video for them titled "Glass Walls", which was harshly critical of slaughterhouses, the meat industry, and their effect on animal welfare. McCartney has also supported campaigns headed by the Humane Society of the United States, Humane Society International, World Animal Protection, and the David Shepherd Wildlife Foundation. Paul and Linda McCartney agreed to appear in The Simpsons episode "Lisa the Vegetarian" on the condition that Lisa remain vegetarian for the rest of the series.

Following McCartney's marriage to Mills, he joined her in a campaign against land mines, becoming a patron of Adopt-A-Minefield. In a 2003 meeting at the Kremlin with Vladimir Putin, ahead of a concert in Red Square, McCartney and Mills urged Russia to join the anti-landmine campaign. In 2006, the McCartneys travelled to Prince Edward Island to raise international awareness of seal hunting. The couple debated with Danny Williams, Newfoundland's then Premier, on Larry King Live, stating that fishermen should stop hunting seals and start seal-watching businesses instead. McCartney also supports the Make Poverty History campaign.

McCartney has participated in several charity recordings and performances, including the Concerts for the People of Kampuchea, Ferry Aid, Band Aid, Live Aid, Live 8, and the 1989 recording of "Ferry Cross the Mersey". In 2004, he donated a song to an album to aid the "US Campaign for Burma", in support of Burmese Nobel laureate Aung San Suu Kyi. In 2008, he donated a song to Aid Still Required's CD, organised as an effort to raise funds to assist with the recovery from the devastation caused in Southeast Asia by the 2004 tsunami.

In 2009, McCartney wrote to Tenzin Gyatso, the 14th Dalai Lama, asking him why he was not a vegetarian. As McCartney explained, "He wrote back very kindly, saying, 'my doctors tell me that I must eat meat'. And I wrote back again, saying, you know, I don't think that's right ... I think he's now being told ... that he can get his protein somewhere else ... It just doesn't seem right—the Dalai Lama, on the one hand, saying, 'Hey guys, don't harm sentient beings ... Oh, and by the way, I'm having a steak.'" In 2012, McCartney joined the anti-fracking campaign Artists Against Fracking.

Save the Arctic is a campaign to protect the Arctic and an international outcry and a renewed focus concern on oil development in the Arctic, attracting the support of more than five million people. This includes McCartney, Archbishop Desmond Tutu and 11 Nobel Peace Prize winners. In 2015, following British prime minister David Cameron's decision to give members of parliament a free vote on amending the law against fox hunting, McCartney was quoted: "The people of Britain are behind this Tory government on many things but the vast majority of us will be against them if hunting is reintroduced. It is cruel and unnecessary and will lose them support from ordinary people and animal lovers like myself." After the 2016 Orlando shooting, McCartney expressed his solidarity for the victims during a concert in Berlin.

During the COVID-19 pandemic, McCartney called for Chinese wet markets (which sell live animals, including wild ones) to be banned. He expressed concern over both the health impacts of the practice as well as its cruelty to animals. In 2020 McCartney commented on ecocide, stating that he "recently heard about this campaign to make ecocide a crime at the International Criminal Court. The idea is clearly catching on ... and not before time if we are to prevent further devastation of the planet." McCartney is one of the 100 contributors to the book Dear NHS: 100 Stories to Say Thank You, of which all proceeds go to NHS Charities Together and The Lullaby Trust.

In 2024, McCartney continued his connection to The Tree Register by sponsoring the first ever Tree Register Yearbook.

=== Football ===
McCartney has publicly professed support for Everton F.C. and has also shown favour for Liverpool F.C. In 2008, he ended speculation about his allegiance when he said: "Here's the deal: my father was born in Everton, my family are officially Evertonians, so if it comes down to a derby match or an FA Cup final between the two, I would have to support Everton. But after a concert at Wembley Arena I got a bit of a friendship with Kenny Dalglish, who had been to the gig and I thought 'You know what? I am just going to support them both because it's all Liverpool.'"

=== Political views ===
McCartney campaigned against the United Kingdom's continued membership of the European Economic Community in the 1975 referendum. In September 2019, McCartney stated that the 2016 Brexit referendum was "probably a mistake," saying that the situation at the time was "a mess." He also said that the 2016 campaign had consisted of "all crazy promises". He did not vote due to his ongoing tour at the time of the referendum and stated that he would likely not have voted due to his confusion on the matter.

McCartney refused to perform his song "Freedom" in The 'US' Tour as he felt the song had become "hijacked" and acquired a militaristic meaning due to the George W. Bush administration's war on terror.

In June 2016, following the Pulse nightclub shooting in Orlando, Florida, McCartney signed an open letter published in Billboard urging the United States Congress to impose stricter gun control. In 2018, McCartney attended a March for Our Lives rally in New York City. McCartney cited the murder of John Lennon as motivation for joining the protests when he told a CNN journalist, "One of my best friends was killed in gun violence, so it's important to me."

=== Relationships ===
==== Girlfriends and wives ====
McCartney's first serious girlfriend in Liverpool was Dorothy "Dot" Rhone, whom he met at the Casbah club in 1959. The couple had a two-and-a-half-year relationship, and were due to marry until Rhone's miscarriage, after which McCartney ended the engagement. McCartney began dating British actress Jane Asher in 1963. The two resided at Asher's parents' home in Marylebone, central London, for more than two years before moving to McCartney's own home in St John's Wood in March 1966. He wrote several songs while living with the Ashers, including "Yesterday", "And I Love Her", "You Won't See Me" and "I'm Looking Through You", the latter three having been inspired by their romance. They had a five-year relationship and planned to marry, but Asher broke off the engagement after she discovered that McCartney had become involved with an American screenwriter named Francie Schwartz.

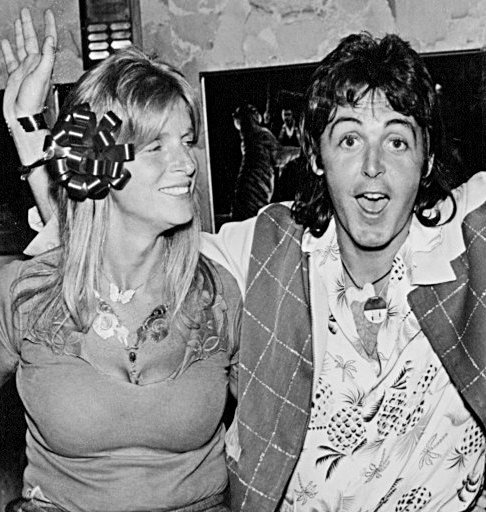
With Linda Eastman in 1976

McCartney's first wife was New Yorker Linda Eastman, whom he married in March 1969. She had first met the Beatles in 1966 as a photographer. She commented, "It was John who interested me at the start. He was my Beatle hero. But when I met him the fascination faded fast, and I found it was Paul I liked." The pair first became properly acquainted in May 1967 at a Georgie Fame concert at The Bag O'Nails club, during her UK assignment to photograph rock musicians in London. About their relationship, Paul said, "We had a lot of fun together ... just the nature of how we aren't, our favourite thing really is to just hang, to have fun. And Linda's very big on just following the moment." After the break-up of the Beatles, the McCartneys collaborated musically and formed Wings in 1971. They faced derision from some fans and critics, who questioned her inclusion. He went on to say, "We thought we were in it for the fun ... it was just something we wanted to do, so if we got it wrong—big deal. We didn't have to justify ourselves."

Paul and Linda had four children—Linda's daughter Heather (legally adopted by Paul), Mary, Stella, and James—and remained married until Linda's death from breast cancer at age 56 in 1998. After Linda died, Paul said, "I got a counsellor because I knew that I would need some help. He was great, particularly in helping me get rid of my guilt [about wishing I'd been] perfect all the time ... a real bugger. But then I thought, hang on a minute. We're just human. That was the beautiful thing about our marriage. We were just a boyfriend and girlfriend having babies."

In 2002, McCartney married Heather Mills, a former model and anti-landmine campaigner. In 2003, the couple had a child, Beatrice Milly, named in honour of Mills's late mother and one of McCartney's aunts. They separated in April 2006 and divorced acrimoniously in May 2008. In 2004, he commented on media animosity toward his partners: "[the British public] didn't like me giving up on Jane Asher ... I married [Linda], a New York divorcee with a child, and at the time they didn't like that".

McCartney married New Yorker Nancy Shevell in a civil ceremony at Marylebone Town Hall, London, on 9 October 2011. The wedding was a modest event attended by a group of about 30 relatives and friends. The couple had been together since November 2007. Shevell is vice-president of a family-owned transportation conglomerate which owned the defunct New England Motor Freight company, which entered bankruptcy in 2019. She was a former member of the board of the New York area's Metropolitan Transportation Authority. Shevell is about 18 years younger than McCartney. They had known each other for about 20 years prior to marrying, having met because both had homes in the Hamptons.

==== Former Beatles ====
===== John Lennon =====
John is kinda like a constant ... always there in my being ... in my soul, so I always think of him.

— McCartney, Guitar World, January 2000

Following the Beatles' break-up, McCartney initially had a strained relationship with Lennon, although they briefly became close again in early 1974, and played music together on one occasion. In later years, the two grew apart. McCartney often phoned Lennon, but was apprehensive about the reception he would receive. McCartney's last telephone call to Lennon, days before Lennon and Ono released Double Fantasy, was friendly: "[It is] a consoling factor for me, because I do feel it was sad that we never actually sat down and straightened our differences out. But fortunately for me, the last phone conversation I ever had with him was really great, and we didn't have any kind of blow-up", he said.

On 9 December 1980, McCartney followed the news that Lennon had been murdered the previous night; Lennon's death created a media frenzy around the surviving members of the band. McCartney was leaving an Oxford Street recording studio that evening when he was surrounded by reporters who asked him for his reaction; he responded: "It's a drag". The press quickly criticised him for what appeared to be a superficial response. In 2025 Sean Ono Lennon said: “I always notice the look in his eyes and the tone of his voice. Really felt like someone who was unable to process what was going on. He just seemed almost robotic, which I think some people took possibly as coldness, but I never took it as that, ’cause I understood even then what it was like when something that terrible happens". In 1983, McCartney said: "I would not have been as typically human and standoffish as I was if I knew John was going to die. I would have made more of an effort to try and get behind his 'mask' and have a better relationship with him." He told Mojo in 2002 that Lennon was his greatest hero. McCartney sang backing vocals on Harrison's 1981 tribute to Lennon, "All Those Years Ago", which featured Starr on drums. He also released his own tribute to Lennon, "Here Today", in 1982.

In 2010, Yoko Ono referred to John and Paul as brothers. "Sure, they were two macho, very talented guys who had strong opinions, arguments, like most brothers. But when it came to the crux of the matter, when Paul thought John was in dire straights, he helped".

===== George Harrison =====
Discussing his relationship with McCartney, Harrison said: "Paul would always help along when you'd done his ten songs—then when he got 'round to doing one of my songs, he would help. It was silly. It was very selfish, actually ... There were a lot of tracks, though, where I played bass ... because what Paul would do—if he'd written a song, he'd learn all the parts for Paul and then come in the studio and say (sometimes he was very difficult): 'Do this'. He'd never give you the opportunity to come out with something." In 1988, Harrison said: "Actually, I love Paul, he's my mate, and it doesn't matter what they say in the papers, they're not gonna get much mileage out of that one." After Harrison's death in November 2001, McCartney said he was "a lovely guy and a very brave man who had a wonderful sense of humour". He went on to say: "We grew up together and we just had so many beautiful times together—that's what I am going to remember. I'll always love him, he's my baby brother."

===== Ringo Starr =====
McCartney and Starr collaborated on several post-Beatles projects, starting in 1973 when McCartney contributed instrumentation and backing vocals for "Six O'Clock", a song McCartney wrote for Starr's album Ringo. McCartney played a kazoo solo on "You're Sixteen" from the same album. Starr appeared as a fictional version of himself in McCartney's 1984 film Give My Regards to Broad Street, and played drums on most tracks of the soundtrack album, which includes re-recordings of several McCartney-penned Beatles songs. Starr played drums and sang backing vocals on "Beautiful Night" from McCartney's 1997 album Flaming Pie. The pair collaborated again in 1998, on Starr's Vertical Man, which featured McCartney's backing vocals on three songs, and instrumentation on one. Since Harrison's death in 2001, McCartney has contributed to several of Starr's albums and the two have performed together on stage on several occasions.

== Legacy ==
=== Achievements ===
McCartney was inducted into the Rock and Roll Hall of Fame in 1988 as a member of the Beatles and again as a solo artist in 1999. In 1979, the Guinness Book of World Records recognised McCartney as the "most honored composer and performer in music", with 60 gold discs (43 with the Beatles, 17 with Wings) and, as a member of the Beatles, sales of over 100 million singles and 100 million albums, and as the "most successful song writer", he wrote jointly or solo 43 songs which sold one million or more records between 1962 and 1978. In 2009, Guinness World Records again recognised McCartney as the "most successful songwriter" having written or co-written 188 charted records in the United Kingdom, of which 91 reached the top 10 and 33 made it to number one.

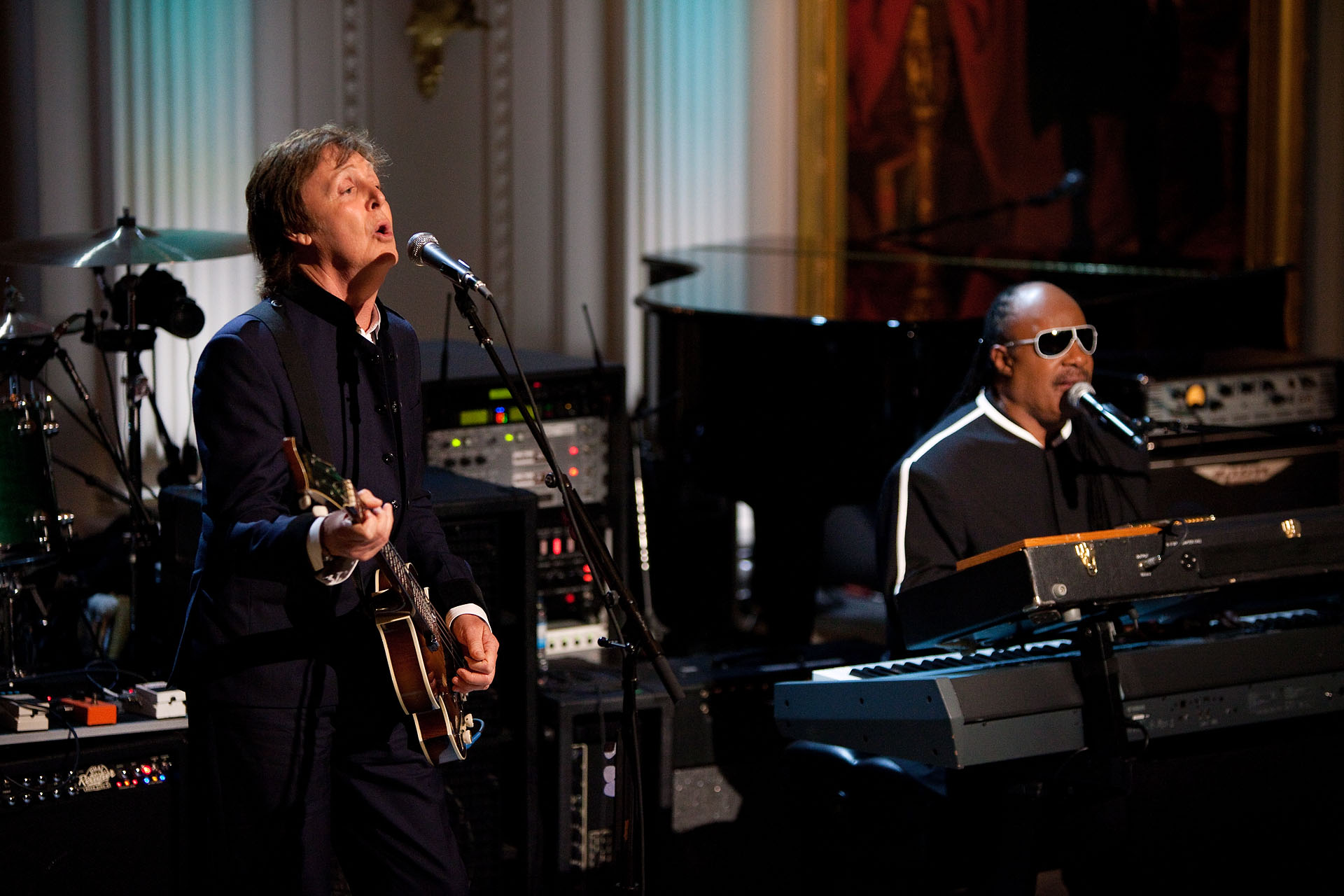
Paul McCartney and Stevie Wonder perform "Ebony and Ivory" at a concert at the White House in 2010

McCartney has written, or co-written, 32 number-one singles on the Billboard Hot 100: twenty with the Beatles; seven solo or with Wings; one as a co-writer of "A World Without Love", a number-one single for Peter and Gordon; one as a co-writer on Elton John's cover of "Lucy in the Sky with Diamonds"; one as a co-writer on Stars on 45's "Medley"; one as a co-writer with Michael Jackson on "Say Say Say"; and one as writer on "Ebony and Ivory" performed with Stevie Wonder. As of 2009, he has 15.5 million RIAA-certified units in the United States as a solo artist, plus another 10 million with Wings.

Credited with more number ones in the UK than any other artist, McCartney has participated in twenty-four chart topping singles: seventeen with the Beatles, one solo, and one each with Wings, Stevie Wonder, Ferry Aid, Band Aid, Band Aid 20 and "The Christians et al." (Note: As of 2012, Elvis Presley has achieved the most UK number-ones as a solo artist with eighteen.) He is the only artist to reach the UK number one as a soloist ("Pipes of Peace"), duo ("Ebony and Ivory" with Wonder), trio ("Mull of Kintyre", Wings), quartet ("She Loves You", the Beatles), quintet ("Get Back", the Beatles with Billy Preston) and as part of a musical ensemble for charity (Ferry Aid).

"Yesterday" is one of the most covered songs in history, with more than 2,200 recorded versions. According to the BBC, it is "the only one by a UK writer to have been aired more than seven million times on American TV and radio and is third in the all-time list ... [and] is the most played song by a British writer [last] century in the US". His 1968 Beatles composition "Hey Jude" achieved the highest sales in the UK that year and topped the US charts for nine weeks, which is longer than any other Beatles single. It was also the longest single released by the band and, at seven minutes eleven seconds, was at that time the longest number one. "Hey Jude" is the best-selling Beatles single, achieving sales of over five million copies soon after its release. (Note: "Hey Jude" was covered by several prominent artists, including Elvis Presley, Bing Crosby, Count Basie and Wilson Pickett.)

In July 2005, McCartney's performance of "Sgt. Pepper's Lonely Hearts Club Band" with U2 at Live 8 became the fastest-released single in history. Available within forty-five minutes of its recording, hours later it had achieved number one on the UK Official Download Chart.

In December 2020, with the release of McCartney III and its subsequent charting at number 2 on the US Billboard 200, McCartney became the first artist to have a new album in the top two chart positions in each of the last six decades.

=== Awards and honours ===
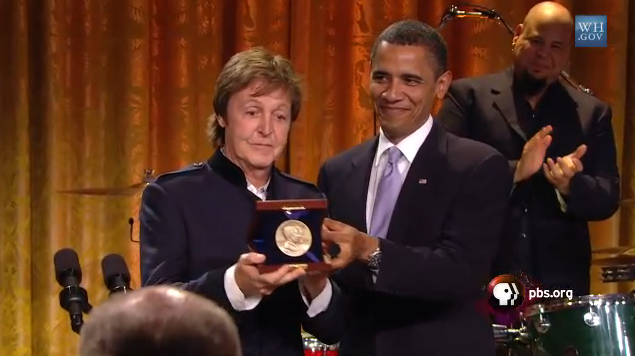
McCartney receiving the 2010 Gershwin Prize from US President Barack Obama

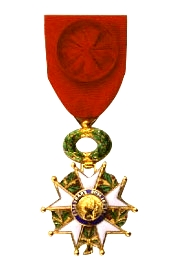
Légion d'honneur

Over his career McCartney has received 19 Grammy Awards, an Academy Award, a Primetime Emmy Award, and a Critics' Choice Movie Award as well as nominations for two BAFTA Awards and three Golden Globe Awards. (Note: Ten as a member of the Beatles; Six as a solo artist; Two as a member of Wings; One as part of a joint collaboration) He has also been inducted into the Rock and Roll Hall of Fame twice: in 1988 as a member of the Beatles, and in 1999 as a solo artist.

Organisation	Year	Honour	Ref.
Queen Elizabeth II	1965	Member of the Order of the British Empire	
University of Sussex	1988	Honorary Doctor of the University degree	
Queen Elizabeth II	1997	Knighted by for services to music	
The Ivors Academy	2000	Fellowship	
BRIT Award	2008	Outstanding Contribution to Music	
Yale University	2008	Honorary Doctor of Music degree	
Gershwin Prize	2010	Contributions to popular music	
John F. Kennedy Center for the Performing Arts	2010	Kennedy Center Honors	
Hollywood Walk of Fame	2012	Walk of Fame Star	
Légion d'Honneur	2012	For his services to music	
MusiCares	2012	Person of the Year	
International Astronomical Union	2015	4148 McCartney, asteroid named after him at the Minor Planet Center	
Queen Elizabeth II	2017	Appointed Member of the Order of the Companions of Honour (CH)	
People for the Ethical Treatment of Animals	2020	Lifetime Achievement Award	

Coat of arms of Paul McCartney
Notes Granted by the College of Arms, 18 June 2001 Crest On a wreath of the colours a Liver Bird calling Sable supporting with the dexter claws a guitar Or stringed Sable. Escutcheon Or between two Flaunches fracted fesswise two roundels Sable over all six guitar strings palewise throughout counterchanged. Motto ECCE COR MEUM (Behold My Heart) Orders Suspended below the Shield, the insignia of the Order of the Companions of Honour (CH), Knight Bachelor, and a member of the Order of the British Empire (MBE). Symbolism The guitar is McCartney's best-known instrument, the liver bird is the symbol of his hometown of Liverpool, the flaunches invoke beetle backs to reference The Beatles, and Ecce Cor Meum is a classical music album he wrote.

== Discography ==
=== Solo ===
- McCartney (1970)
- Ram (1971) (with Linda McCartney)
- McCartney II (1980)
- Tug of War (1982)
- Pipes of Peace (1983)
- Give My Regards to Broad Street (1984)
- Press to Play (1986)
- CHOBA B CCCP (1988)
- Flowers in the Dirt (1989)
- Off the Ground (1993)
- Flaming Pie (1997)
- Run Devil Run (1999)
- Driving Rain (2001)
- Chaos and Creation in the Backyard (2005)
- Memory Almost Full (2007)
- Kisses on the Bottom (2012)
- New (2013)
- Egypt Station (2018)
- McCartney III (2020)
- The Boys of Dungeon Lane (2026)

=== With Wings ===
- Wild Life (1971)
- Red Rose Speedway (1973)
- Band on the Run (1973)
- Venus and Mars (1975)
- Wings at the Speed of Sound (1976)
- London Town (1978)
- Back to the Egg (1979)
- One Hand Clapping (2024) (live-in-studio album)

=== Classical ===
- Paul McCartney's Liverpool Oratorio (1991) (with Carl Davis)
- Standing Stone (1997)
- Working Classical (1999)
- Ecce Cor Meum (2006)
- Ocean's Kingdom (2011) (dance score with Peter Martins)

=== As the Fireman (McCartney and Youth) ===
- Strawberries Oceans Ships Forest (1993)
- Rushes (1998)
- Electric Arguments (2008)

=== Other ===
- The Family Way (1967) (soundtrack)
- Thrillington (1977) (Ram instrumental)
- Liverpool Sound Collage (2000) (with Super Furry Animals & The Beatles archival sound)
- Twin Freaks (2005) (remix album with DJ Freelance Hellraiser)
- McCartney III Imagined (2021) (remix album)

== Filmography ==
=== Film ===
Year	Title	Role	Notes
1964	A Hard Day's Night	Himself	McCartney plays a fictionalised version of himself
1965	Help!	Himself	McCartney plays a fictionalised version of himself
1967	Magical Mystery Tour	Himself / Major McCartney / Red-Nosed Magician (uncredited)	Director (writer and producer uncredited)
1968	Yellow Submarine	Himself (uncredited)	Animated, based upon a song by Lennon–McCartney
1970	Let It Be	Himself	Documentary
1977	The Day the Music Died	Himself	Documentary
1980	Concert for Kampuchea	Himself	Documentary
1980	Rockshow	Himself	Documentary
1982	The Cooler	Cowboy	Short, executive producer
1982	The Compleat Beatles	Himself	Documentary
1984	Give My Regards to Broad Street	Himself	Screenplay, producer, actor
1985	Rupert and the Frog Song	Rupert / Edward / Bill / Boy Frog (voice)	Animated short, writer, executive producer
1987	Eat the Rich	Banquet Rich	Cameo
1987	The Real Buddy Holly Story	Himself	Documentary, producer
1990	The Beatles: The First U.S. Visit	Himself	Documentary
1991	Get Back	Himself	Documentary
1992	Daumier's Law		Animated short, music, writer, executive producer
1997	Tropic Island Hum	Wirral / Froggo / Bison / Various (voice)	Animated short, writer, executive producer
2000	Shadow Cycle		Animated short, writer
2001	Tuesday	Himself (voice)	Animated short, executive producer
2003	Mayor of the Sunset Strip	Himself	Documentary
2003	Concert for George	Himself	Documentary
2008	Tribute This!	Himself	Documentary
2008	All Together Now	Himself	Documentary
2009	Brüno	Himself	Cameo
2009	Al's Brain in 3-D	Man on the Street	Short
2010	David Wants to Fly	Himself	Documentary
2010	The Last Play at Shea	Himself	Documentary
2011	The Love We Make	Himself	Documentary
2011	George Harrison: Living in the Material World	Himself	Documentary
2013	Sound City	Himself	Documentary
2013	12-12-12	Himself	Documentary, producer
2014	Finding Fela	Himself	Documentary
2014	Glen Campbell: I'll Be Me	Himself	Documentary
2016	The Beatles: Eight Days a Week	Himself	Documentary
2017	Pirates of the Caribbean: Dead Men Tell No Tales	Uncle Jack	Cameo
2018	Quincy	Himself	Documentary
2018	The Bruce McMouse Show	Himself	Unreleased Wings concert film (Note: with animation produced from 1972 to 1977, theatrical release 2019)
2022	If These Walls Could Sing	Himself	Documentary directed by Mary McCartney
2024	Stevie Van Zandt: Disciple	Himself	Documentary
2025	Spinal Tap II: The End Continues	Himself	Cameo
2025	Man on the Run	Himself	Documentary, executive producer

=== Television ===
Year	Title	Role	Notes
1963–64	Ready Steady Go!	Himself	Music programme, 3 episodes
1964	Around the Beatles	Himself	Concert special
1964	What's Happening! The Beatles in the U.S.	Himself	Documentary
1964–65	The Ed Sullivan Show	Himself	Variety show, 4 episodes
1965	The Music of Lennon & McCartney	Himself	Variety tribute special
1966	The Beatles at Shea Stadium	Himself	Concert special
1966	The Beatles in Japan	Himself	Concert special
1973	James Paul McCartney	Himself	TV special
1975	A Salute to the Beatles: Once upon a Time	Himself	Documentary
1977	All You Need Is Love: The Story of Popular Music	Himself	Documentary mini-series
1985	Live Aid	Himself	Benefit concert special
1987	It Was Twenty Years Ago Today	Himself	Documentary
1988	The Power of Music	Himself, narrator	Documentary
1995	The Simpsons	Himself (voice)	Episode: "Lisa the Vegetarian"
1995	The Beatles Anthology	Himself	Documentary mini-series
1997	Music for Montserrat	Himself	Benefit concert special
2001	Wingspan	Himself	Documentary
2001	The Concert for New York City	Himself	Benefit concert special
2005	Live 8	Himself	Benefit concert special
2005	Saturday Night Live	Paul Simon	Episode: "Alec Baldwin/Christina Aguilera"
2012	30 Rock	Himself	Episode: "Live from Studio 6H" (East Coast airing only)
2015	SNL40: The Anniversary Special	Himself	Musical guest—"Maybe I'm Amazed"
2015	BoJack Horseman	Himself (voice)	Episode: "After the Party"
2019–26	The Late Show with Stephen Colbert	Himself	3 episodes, including the series finale
2021	McCartney 3,2,1	Himself	Documentary mini-series
2021	The Beatles: Get Back	Himself	Documentary mini-series
2025	SNL50: The Anniversary Special	Himself	Musical guest—"Golden Slumbers"/"Carry That Weight"/"The End"
2026	Saturday Night Live season 51	Himself	Musical guest—"Days We Left Behind"/"Band on the Run"/"Coming Up"

== Tours ==
Wings tours

- Wings University Tour (1972)
- Wings Over Europe Tour (1972)
- Wings 1973 UK Tour (1973)
- Wings Over the World tour (1975–1976)
- Wings UK Tour 1979 (1979)

Solo tours

- The Paul McCartney World Tour (1989–1990)
- Unplugged Tour 1991 (1991)
- The New World Tour (1993)
- Driving World Tour (2002)
- Back in the World Tour (2003)
- '04 Summer Tour (2004)
- The 'US' Tour (2005)
- Secret Tour 2007 (2007)
- Summer Live '09 (2009)
- Good Evening Europe Tour (2009)
- Up and Coming Tour (2010–2011)
- On the Run (2011–2012)
- Out There (2013–2015)
- One on One (2016–2017)
- 2018 Secret Gigs (2018)
- Freshen Up (2018–2019)
- Got Back (2022–2025)

== See also ==
- The Beatles timeline
- Cultural impact of the Beatles
- List of agnostics
- List of animal rights advocates
- List of British Grammy Award winners and nominees
- List of celebrities by net worth
- List of highest-grossing live music artists
- List of largest music deals
- Grammy Award records § Most Grammys won by a male artist
- Outline of the Beatles
- "Paul is dead" – urban legend/conspiracy theory that Paul McCartney is dead

== Sources ==
- Babiuk, Andy (2002). Beatles Gear: All the Fab Four's Instruments, from Stage to Studio (Revised ed.). Backbeat Books. ISBN 978-0-87930-731-8.
- Bacon, Tony; Morgan, Gareth (2006). Paul McCartney – Bass Master – Playing the Great Beatles Basslines (1st ed.). Backbeat Books. ISBN 978-0-87930-884-1.
- Badman, Keith (1999). The Beatles After the Breakup 1970–2000: A Day-by-Day Diary (2001 ed.). Omnibus. ISBN 978-0-7119-8307-6.
- Benitez, Vincent Perez (2010). The Words and Music of Paul McCartney: The Solo Years. Praeger. ISBN 978-0-313-34969-0.
- Benitez, Vincent P. (2019). "'That Was Me' in 'Vintage Clothes': Intertextuality and the White Album Songs of Paul McCartney." In The Beatles through a Glass Onion: Reconsidering the White Album, ed. Mark Osteen, 213–29. Tracking Pop Series. Ann Arbor, MI: The University of Michigan Press. ISBN 978-0-472-07408-2.
- Blaney, John (2007). Lennon and McCartney: Together Alone (1st ed.). Jawbone Press. ISBN 978-1-906002-02-2.
- Bronson, Fred (1992). The Billboard Book of Number One Hits (3rd revised ed.). Billboard Books. ISBN 978-0-8230-8298-8.
- Brown, Peter; Gaines, Steven (2002). The Love You Make: An Insider's Story of The Beatles. New American Library. ISBN 978-0-451-20735-7.
- Buk, Askold (1996). "Strum Together". Guitar World: Acoustic (17).
- Carlin, Peter Ames (2009). Paul McCartney: A Life. Touchstone. ISBN 978-1-4165-6209-2.
- Doggett, Peter (2009). You Never Give Me Your Money: The Beatles After the Breakup (1st US hardcover ed.). Harper. ISBN 978-0-06-177446-1.
- Emerick, Geoff; Massey, Howard (2006). Here, There and Everywhere: My Life Recording the Music of The Beatles. Gotham. ISBN 978-1-59240-269-4.
- Everett, Walter (1999). The Beatles as Musicians: Revolver through the Anthology. Oxford University Press. ISBN 978-0-19-512941-0.
- George-Warren, Holly, ed. (2001). The Rolling Stone Encyclopedia of Rock & Roll (2005 revised and updated ed.). Fireside. ISBN 978-0-7432-9201-6.
- Gould, Jonathan (2007). Can't Buy Me Love: The Beatles, Britain and America (First Paperback ed.). Three Rivers Press. ISBN 978-0-307-35338-2.
- Graff, Gary (January 2000). "Yesterday & Today". Guitar World. 20 (1).
- Harry, Bill (2000a). The Beatles Encyclopedia: Revised and Updated. Virgin. ISBN 978-0-7535-0481-9.
- Harry, Bill (2003). The George Harrison Encyclopedia. Virgin. ISBN 978-0-7535-0822-0.
- Harry, Bill (2000b). The John Lennon Encyclopedia. Virgin. ISBN 978-0-7535-0404-8.
- Harry, Bill (2002). The Paul McCartney Encyclopedia. Virgin. ISBN 978-0-7535-0716-2.
- Ingham, Chris (2009). The Rough Guide to The Beatles (3rd ed.). Rough Guides. ISBN 978-1-84836-525-4.
- Jisi, Chris (October 2005). "He Can Work It Out". Bass Player. 16 (10).
- Levy, Joe, ed. (2005). Rolling Stone's 500 Greatest Albums of All Time (First Paperback ed.). Wenner Books. ISBN 978-1-932958-61-4.
- Lewisohn, Mark (1992). The Complete Beatles Chronicle:The Definitive Day-By-Day Guide to the Beatles' Entire Career (2010 ed.). Chicago Review Press. ISBN 978-1-56976-534-0.
- Lewisohn, Mark, ed. (2002). Wingspan: Paul McCartney's Band on the Run. Little, Brown. ISBN 978-0-316-86032-1.
- "Most Excellent Order of the British Empire". The London Gazette (supplement). 4 June 1965. Archived from the original on 11 January 2009.
- MacDonald, Ian (2005). Revolution in the Head: The Beatles' Records and the Sixties (3rd (2007) ed.). Chicago Review Press. ISBN 978-1-55652-733-3.
- McCartney, Paul (2001). Mitchell, Adrian (ed.). Blackbird singing: Poems and Lyrics 1965–1999. W. W. Norton and Company Inc. ISBN 978-0-393-02049-6.
- McGee, Garry (2003). Band on the Run: A History of Paul McCartney and Wings. Taylor Trade. ISBN 978-0-87833-304-2.
- Miles, Barry (1997). Paul McCartney: Many Years From Now (1st Hardcover ed.). Henry Holt & Company. ISBN 978-0-8050-5248-0.
- Miles, Barry (1998). The Beatles: A Diary—An Intimate Day by Day History (2009 ed.). JG Press. ISBN 978-1-57215-010-2.
- Miles, Barry (2001). The Beatles Diary Volume 1: The Beatles Years. Omnibus. ISBN 978-0-7119-8308-3.
- Molenda, Michael (November 2005). "Here, There, and Everywhere". Guitar Player. 39 (11).
- Mulhern, Tom (July 1990). "Paul McCartney". Guitar Player. 24, No.7 (246).
- Norman, Philip (1981). Shout!. MJF Books.
- Roberts, David, ed. (2005). British Hit Singles & Albums (18 ed.). Guinness World Records Limited. ISBN 978-1-904994-00-8.
- Sandford, Christopher (2006). McCartney. Carroll & Graf. ISBN 978-0-7867-1614-2.
- Sheff, David (1981). Golson, G. Barry (ed.). The Playboy Interviews with John Lennon & Yoko Ono. Playboy Press. ISBN 978-0-87223-705-6.
- Sounes, Howard (2010). Fab: An Intimate Life of Paul McCartney. Da Capo Press. ISBN 978-0-306-81783-0.
- Southall, Brian; Perry, Rupert (2006). Northern Songs: The True Story of the Beatles Song Publishing Empire. Omnibus. ISBN 978-1-84609-237-4.
- Spitz, Bob (2005). The Beatles: The Biography. Little, Brown and Company. ISBN 978-0-316-80352-6.
- The Beatles (2000). The Beatles Anthology. Chronicle Books. ISBN 978-0-8118-3636-4.
- Wenner, Jann (2000). George-Warren, Holly (ed.). Lennon Remembers. Verso. ISBN 978-1-85984-600-1.
- Womack, Kenneth (2007). Long and Winding Roads: The Evolving Artistry of the Beatles. Continuum. ISBN 978-0-8264-1746-6.
