= Paul McCartney: Music & Animation =

- Production company: MPL Communications
- Distributed by: Buena Vista Home Entertainment
- Release date: 2004 (DVD)
- Running time: 45 minutes

Paul McCartney: Music & Animation is an animated anthology film compiling three animated short films produced by Paul McCartney. It was released by Buena Vista Home Entertainment under the Miramax Home Entertainment label on DVD. The film includes Rupert & the Frog Song, Tuesday and Tropic Island Hum. Paul McCartney wrote or composed music for each short.

== Segments ==
Tropic Island Hum tells the story of Wirral the Squirrel, who was almost killed by soldiers. Froggo helped him and took him to another place he would go. He couldn't go back there again! But then, he finds a tropical island. Bison is the chief of that island, and Wirral's new love crush is Wilhelmina. Then, all 3 of them (except Wilhelmina) get cleaned up and that night, they perform the theme song to the island. Bison sings the first part of the song. A parrot gets banged on the bass drum and is dizzy. Later, an alligator sings. Right after that, Wirral blushes at his new love crush Wilhelmina. Then a bad thing appears, the mask-animals try to ruin the party, but then, a school appears, and, at the end, Wirral & Wilhelmina kiss.

On Tuesday, the frogs fly at 8:00pm every Tuesday night, but one night, they go inside 1 house. 1 frog sneezes because of dust. Then after the dawn appears, they go back to the water.

In Rupert & the Frog Song, Rupert goes on an adventure by himself, but later, he discovers a frog pond. Then the frogs sing "We All Stand Together". At the end, a demonic-looking owl swoops down and scares away all of the singing frogs, after a short moment of ominous atmosphere, Rupert's mom calls for him, and the story ends with him trying to explain what he saw.
