= Give My Regards to Broad Street (film) =

1984 British musical film

- U.S. film poster
- Directed by: Peter Webb
- Written by: Paul McCartney
- Produced by: Andros Epaminondas
- Starring: Paul McCartney; Bryan Brown; Ringo Starr; Barbara Bach; Linda McCartney; Tracey Ullman; Ralph Richardson
- Cinematography: Ian McMillan
- Edited by: Peter Beston
- Music by: Paul McCartney
- Production company: MPL Communications
- Distributed by: 20th Century Fox
- Release date: 23 October 1984 (United States)
- Running time: 109 minutes
- Country: United Kingdom
- Language: English
- Budget: $9 million
- Box office: $1.4 million

Give My Regards to Broad Street is a 1984 British musical drama film produced by Andros Epaminondas and directed by Peter Webb. It stars Paul McCartney, Bryan Brown and Ringo Starr. The film covers a fictional day in the life of McCartney, who wrote the film for the screen, and McCartney, Starr and Linda McCartney all appear as themselves. Despite Give My Regards to Broad Street being unsuccessful, both financially and critically, its soundtrack album sold well. The title is a take on George M. Cohan's song "Give My Regards to Broadway" and refers to London's Broad Street railway station. It was the first appearance for McCartney in a non-documentary feature film since Magical Mystery Tour (1967) and is his last leading role in a feature film to date, though he has continued to play supporting roles and cameos in various media over the years.

Filming and recording of Broad Street began in November 1982, midway through the recording of McCartney's album Pipes of Peace. Production on the album and film continued until July the following year. In the interim, Pipes of Peace and its singles were released, and the film project was scheduled for an autumn 1984 release.

== Plot ==
Paul McCartney is stuck in a traffic jam in his chauffeur-driven car on his way to an interview. He daydreams that he is driving himself in a flashier car crammed with modern technology around the countryside when he gets a call from Steve that Harry, a reformed criminal, is missing, along with the master tapes he was supposed to give to the factory the previous day. Paul races to the studio to find that the police are there investigating the matter, thinking that Harry is back to his old ways. Mr. Rath, to whom the studio owes money, arrives with the news that he will take over the record company if the tapes are not found by midnight.

Following the meeting, the film follows a day in the life of Paul and his work with wife Linda McCartney and friend Ringo Starr, which includes filming two videos, rehearsing in a loft, and recording performances for the radio. In between videos, Paul wonders what Harry might have done: Did he give the master tapes to be bootlegged, did he just run off, or was he murdered? During several songs, Paul has elaborate fantasies in various settings and costumes inspired by his predicament.

Once the day is done, Paul drives around London, and his associates brace themselves for the takeover as midnight approaches. After driving past Broad Street, Paul remembers that Harry was headed there when he last saw him and goes exploring the station. He finds the blue case containing the tapes on a platform bench, and Harry in a small maintenance building nearby, where he accidentally trapped himself while looking for the toilet. They both laugh, they drive off, Paul calls Linda using the car phone, she informs the studio that the tapes have been found, and the takeover is averted. Paul's chauffeur-driven car finally arrives at its destination, and he is awoken from his nap.

== Cast ==
- Paul McCartney as himself
- Bryan Brown as Steve
- Ringo Starr as himself
- Barbara Bach as Journalist
- Linda McCartney as herself
- Philip Jackson as Alan
- Giant Haystacks as Big Bob
- Tracey Ullman as Sandra
- Ralph Richardson as Jim
- George Martin as Producer
- John Bennett as Mr. Rath
- John Burgess as Chauffeur
- Ian Hastings as Harry
- Marie Collett as Valerie
- Graham Dene as voice of disk jockey
- Anthony Bate as City Banker
- Anthony Brown as Police Inspector
- Donald Douglas as Police Detective
- Christopher Ellison as Rath's Minder
- Leonard Fenton as Company Accountant
- Jeremy Child as Record Company Executive
- Richard Kane as Record Company Executive
- Amanda Redman as Office Receptionist
- Geoff Emerick as Engineer
- John Salthouse as Tom the Roadie
- Jeffrey Daniel as Robot Dancer
- Gordon Rollings as The Monster
- John Paul Jones as Bass Guitarist on "Ballroom Dancing"
- Chris Spedding as Guitarist on "Ballroom Dancing", "Not Such a Bad Boy", and "No Values" and Backup Singer on "So Bad"
- Jody Linscott as Percussionist on "Not Such a Bad Boy" and "No Values"
- Eric Stewart as Guitarist/Vocalist on "So Bad"
- Jeff Porcaro as Drummer on "Silly Love Songs"
- Steve Lukather as Guitarist/Vocalist on "Silly Love Songs"
- Louis E. Johnson as Bass Guitarist on "Silly Love Songs"
- Dave Edmunds as Guitarist on "Ballroom Dancing", "Not Such a Bad Boy", and "No Values"

== Production ==
The film was the result of a long-held ambition of McCartney, a lifelong film fan, to become involved in acting again after his success with the Beatles' films. While promoting it McCartney described Give My Regards to Broad Street as his first film in 14 years, but Rockshow had been released four years earlier.

== Rupert and the Frog Song ==
The 13-minute animated film Rupert and the Frog Song was shown in cinemas immediately preceding Give My Regards to Broad Street. The short film contained the song "We All Stand Together", sung by McCartney and "the Frog Chorus". Simultaneously with the film's premiere in November, "We All Stand Together" was released as a single and became a hit in the UK, reaching No.3.

== Video game ==
A video game based on the film was released for the Commodore 64 and ZX Spectrum home computers in 1985. The game was developed by Argus Press Software and released in its Mind Games series. The C64 version was published by Mastertronic in the U.S. (Cat. no. ICD-0082).

The game takes place after the action of the film and it is discovered that one track from the album was missing from the recovered tapes. The missing track was going to be the lead single so without it, the studio is back in jeopardy. The player takes the role of McCartney, who must travel around London to track down members of the band and other people who were at the original studio session to help piece the track back together. The game package contained a fold out map of London and profiles of the characters which the player needs to use to predict where to find them.

== Reception ==
Although its soundtrack was a success, the film was met with negative reviews. Roger Ebert of the Chicago Sun-Times gave the film one out of four stars, praising its music as "wonderful" but wrote that it "is about as close as you can get to a nonmovie, and the parts that do try something are the worst." He particularly criticized the long, irrelevant dream sequences and the poor photography, and he advised readers to buy the soundtrack album and not bother to see the film.

Retrospectively, review aggregator Rotten Tomatoes has clocked the film's positive review score at 22%, based on reviews by 18 critics. Audiences polled by CinemaScore gave the film an average grade of "B-" on an A+ to F scale.

Despite the film’s critical and financial failure, McCartney has maintained over the years that he does not regret making the film as it fulfilled his desire to do so. However, he has conceded that he could have spent more time on the script.

== Awards and nominations ==
"No More Lonely Nights", a song from the film, was nominated for a Golden Globe Award and a BAFTA Film Award for Best Original Song-Motion Picture.
