= George Martin =

English record producer (1926–2016)

Sir George Martin CBE
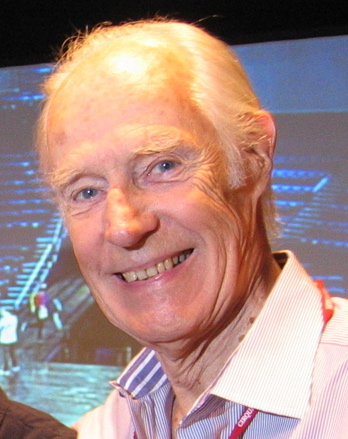
- Martin in 2006
- Born: George Henry Martin; 3 January 1926; London, England
- Died: 8 March 2016 (aged 90); Coleshill, Oxfordshire, England
- Education: Guildhall School of Music and Drama
- Occupations: Record producer; arranger; composer; conductor; musician
- Known for: Working with: The Beatles; America; Cilla Black; Jeff Beck; Mahavishnu Orchestra; Paul McCartney; Ringo Starr; Gerry and the Pacemakers; Céline Dion
- Spouses: Sheena Chisholm (m. 1948; div. 1965); Judy Lockhart Smith (m. 1966)
- Children: 4, including Giles and Gregory Paul Martin
- Musical career
- Genres: Rock; pop; classical; comedy
- Instruments: Keyboards; oboe
- Years active: 1950–2006
- Labels: EMI; Parlophone; Apple

Sir George Henry Martin (3 January 1926 – 8 March 2016) was an English record producer, arranger, composer, conductor, and musician. He was commonly referred to as the "fifth Beatle" due to his extensive involvement in each of the Beatles' original albums. Martin's formal musical expertise and interest in novel recording practices facilitated the group's rudimentary musical education and desire for new musical sounds to record. Most of their orchestral and string arrangements were written by Martin, and he played the piano or keyboards on a number of their records. Their collaborations resulted in popular, highly acclaimed records with innovative sounds, such as the 1967 album Sgt. Pepper's Lonely Hearts Club Band.

Martin's career spanned more than sixty years in music, film, television and live performance. Before working with the Beatles and other pop musicians, he produced comedy and novelty records in the 1950s and early 1960s as the head of EMI's Parlophone label, working with Peter Sellers, Spike Milligan and Bernard Cribbins, among others. In 1965, he left EMI and formed his own production company, Associated Independent Recording.

AllMusic has described Martin as the "world's most famous record producer". In his career, Martin produced 30 number-one hit singles in the United Kingdom and 23 number-one hits in the United States, winning six Grammy Awards. In recognition of his services to the music industry and popular culture, he was made a Knight Bachelor in 1996.

== Early years ==
Martin was born on 3 January 1926 in North London to Henry ("Harry") and Bertha Beatrice (née Simpson) Martin. He had an older sister, Irene. In Martin's early years, the family lived modestly, first in Highbury and then Drayton Park. Harry worked as a craftsman carpenter in a small attic workshop, while Bertha cooked meals at a communal stove in their apartment building. In 1931, the family moved to Aubert Park in Highbury, where they lived with electricity for the first time.

When he was six, Martin's family acquired a piano that sparked his interest in music. At eight years of age, he convinced his parents that he should take piano lessons, but those ended after only six sessions because of a disagreement between his mother and the teacher. Martin created his first piano composition, "The Spider's Dance", at age eight. Martin continued to learn piano on his own through his youth, building a working knowledge of music theory through his natural perfect pitch.

I remember well the very first time I heard a symphony orchestra. I was just in my teens when Sir Adrian Boult brought the BBC Symphony Orchestra to my school for a public concert. It was absolutely magical.

— George Martin

As a child, he attended several Roman Catholic schools, including Our Lady of Sion (Holloway), St Joseph's School (Highgate), and at St Ignatius' College (Stamford Hill), where he won a scholarship. When World War II broke out, Martin's family left London and he was enrolled at Bromley Grammar School. At Bromley, Martin led and played piano in a locally popular dance band, the Four Tune Tellers. The pianists George Shearing and Meade Lux Lewis influenced his style. He also took up acting in a troupe called the Quavers, and, with money earned from playing dances, he resumed formal piano lessons and learned musical notation.

Despite Martin's continued interest in music and "fantasies about being the next Rachmaninoff", he did not initially choose music as a career. Aged 17, in 1943, Martin volunteered for the Fleet Air Arm of the Royal Navy, having been spurred on by their exploits in the Battle of Taranto. He trained at HMS St Vincent in Gosport. The war ended before Martin was involved in any combat, and he left the service in January 1947. On 26 July 1945, Martin appeared on BBC Radio for the first time during a Royal Navy variety show; he played a self-composed piano piece. As he climbed rank in the Navy, Martin consciously adopted the upper-class accent and gentlemanly social demeanour common for officers.

Encouraged by the pianist and teacher Sidney Harrison, Martin used his veteran's grant to attend the Guildhall School of Music and Drama from 1947 to 1950. He studied piano as his main instrument and oboe as his secondary, being interested in the music of Sergei Rachmaninoff, Maurice Ravel, and Cole Porter. Martin also took courses at Guildhall in music composition and orchestration. After graduating, he worked for the BBC's classical music department, also earning money as an oboe player in local bands.

== Career ==
=== EMI and Parlophone ===
Martin joined EMI in November 1950 as an assistant to Oscar Preuss, the head of EMI's Parlophone label. Although having been regarded by EMI as a vital German imprint in the past, it was then not taken seriously and used only for EMI's insignificant acts. Among Martin's early duties was managing Parlophone's classical records catalogue, including Baroque ensemble sessions with Karl Haas; Martin, Haas, and Peter Ustinov soon founded the London Baroque Society together. He also developed a friendship and working relationship with composer Sidney Torch and signed Ron Goodwin to a recording contract. In 1953, Martin produced Goodwin's first record, an instrumental rendition of Charlie Chaplin's theme from Limelight, which made it to no. 3 on the British charts. Despite these early breakthroughs, Martin resented EMI's preference in the early 1950s for short-playing 78 rpm records instead of the new longer-playing 33 1/3 and 45 rpm formats coming into fashion on other labels. He also proved uncomfortable as a song plugger when occasionally assigned the task by Preuss, comparing himself to a "sheep among wolves".

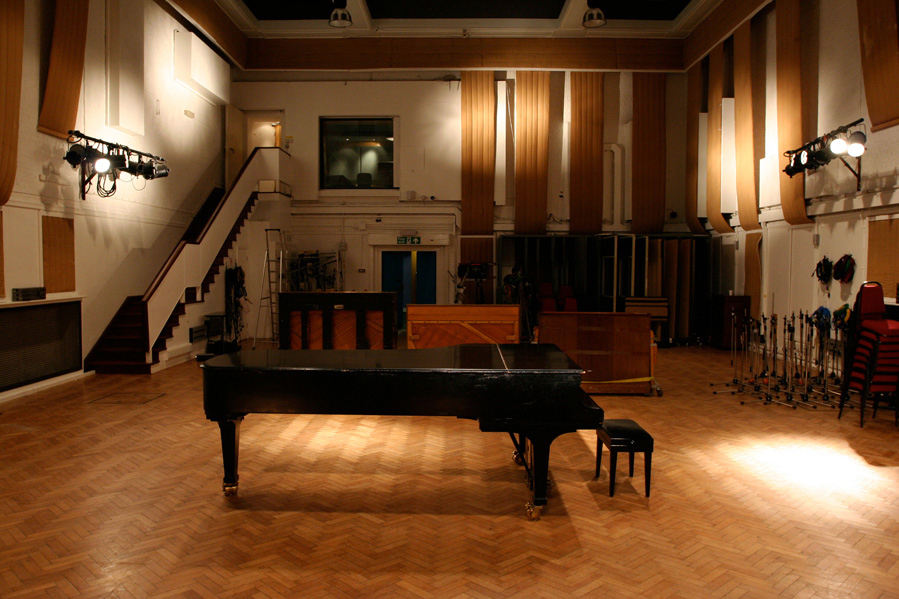
At Parlophone, Martin recorded many of his acts in Studio Two of EMI Studios.

Preuss retired as head of Parlophone in April 1955, leaving the 29-year-old Martin to take over the label. Martin's first hit production came in 1956 in the Johnny Dankworth Band's jazz parody "The Three Blind Mice". However, he had to fight to retain the label, as by late 1956 EMI managers considered moving Parlophone's successful artists to Columbia Records or His Master's Voice, with Martin possibly to take a junior A&R role at the His Master's Voice under Wally Ridley. Martin staved off corporate pressure with successes in comedy records, such as a 1957 recording of the two-man show featuring Michael Flanders and Donald Swann, At the Drop of a Hat. His work boosted the profile of Parlophone from a "sad little company" to a highly profitable business over time. As head of Parlophone, Martin recorded classical and Baroque music, original cast recordings, jazz, and regional music from around Britain and Ireland. He became the first British A&R man to capitalize on the 1956 skiffle boom when he signed the Vipers Skiffle Group after seeing them in London's 2i's Coffee Bar. Martin produced numerous comedy and novelty records. His first success in the genre was the "Mock Mozart" single, performed by Peter Ustinov with Antony Hopkins. In 1953, Martin produced Peter Sellers' debut in music, the failed single "Jakka and the Flying Saucers". Two years later, Martin worked with BBC radio comedy stars the Goons on a parody version of "Unchained Melody", but the song's publishers blocked it from release. The Goons subsequently left Parlophone for Decca, but Sellers, a member of the group, achieved minor success with Martin in 1957 with "Boiled Bananas and Carrots"/"Any Old Iron". Recognising that Sellers was capable of "a daydreaming form of humour which could be amusing and seductive without requiring the trigger of a live audience", Martin pitched a full album to EMI. The result, The Best of Sellers (1958), has been cited by the music historian Mark Lewisohn as the first British comedy LP created in a recording studio. Martin scored a major success in 1961 with the Beyond the Fringe show cast album, starring, among others, Peter Cook and Dudley Moore; the show catalysed Britain's satire boom in the early 1960s.

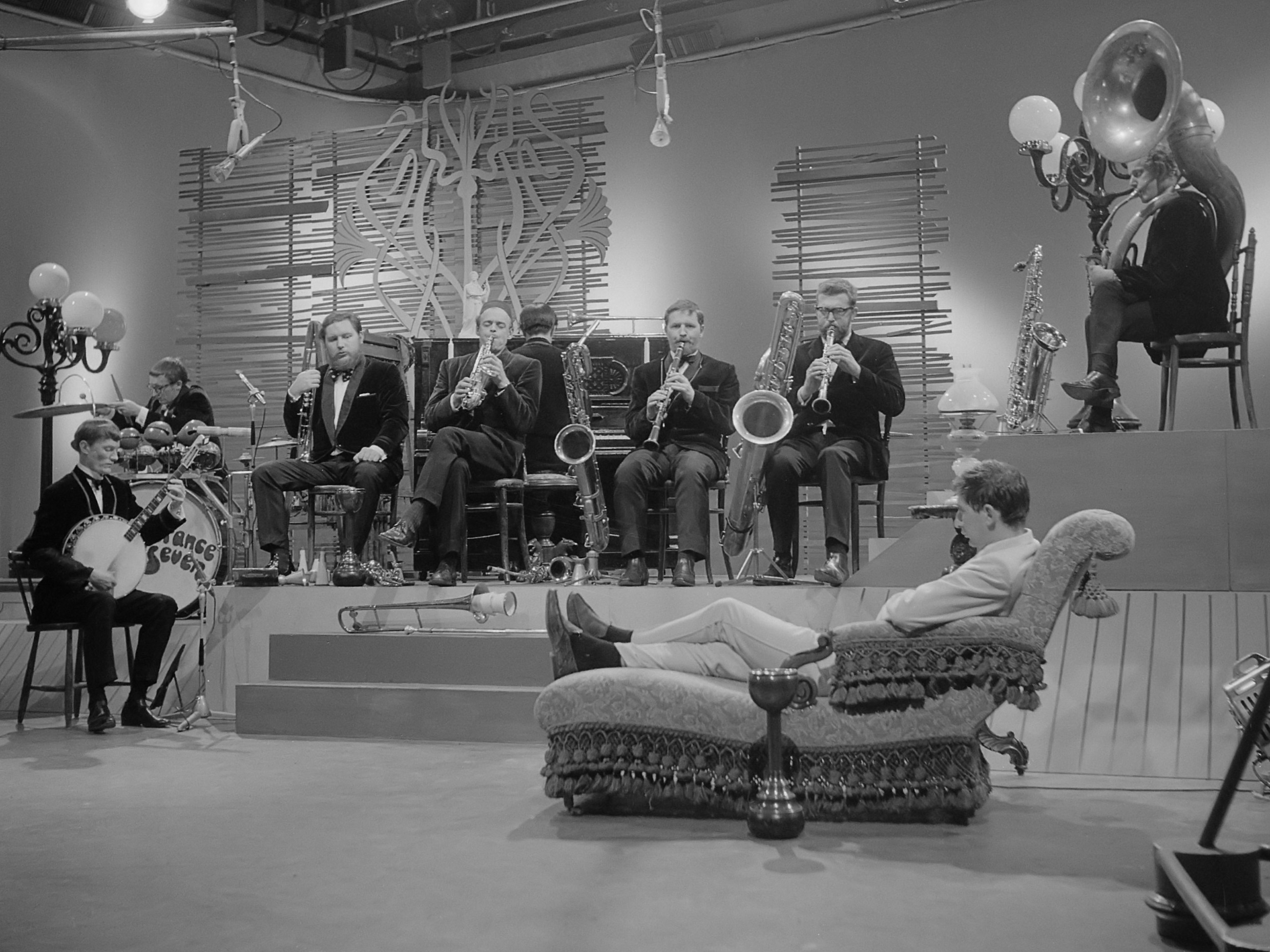
The Temperance Seven, for whom Martin produced his first no. 1 composition

Martin courted controversy in summer 1960, when he produced a cover of the teen novelty song "Itsy Bitsy Teenie Weenie Yellow Polkadot Bikini" and released it mere days after the release of the record in the UK, opening him to public accusations of piracy. Nonetheless, his first British number-one came a year later, in May 1961, with the Temperance Seven song "You're Driving Me Crazy". He then earned praise from EMI chairman Sir Joseph Lockwood for his top-ten 1962 hit with Bernard Cribbins, "The Hole in the Ground". Though Martin wanted to add rock and roll to Parlophone's repertoire, he struggled to find a "fireproof" hit-making pop artist or group.

Martin cultivated a working relationship with Brian Epstein. They discussed the Beatles on 13 February 1962. As a result Martin auditioned them on 6 June 1962. He gave them a record contract backdated to include the music recorded in the audition. Love Me Do was later re-recorded and became the group's first hit in October 1962. In December 1962 in Liverpool Epstein showed Martin other successful local acts like Gerry and the Pacemakers and the Fourmost. Martin urged Epstein also to audition them for EMI. Gerry and the Pacemakers scored their first no. 1 with their version of "How Do You Do It?", which Martin produced, in April 1963. Martin also produced the Epstein-managed Billy J. Kramer and the Dakotas, the Fourmost, and Cilla Black. Between the Beatles, Gerry and the Pacemakers, and Billy J. Kramer and the Dakotas, Martin-produced and Epstein-managed acts were responsible for 37 weeks of no. 1 singles in 1963, transforming Parlophone into the leading EMI label. His work with such Liverpudlian artists contributed to the development of beat music.

==== Rivalries and tensions at EMI ====
By the time he signed a three-year contract renewal in 1959, Martin sought, but failed, to obtain a royalty on Parlophone's record sales, a practice becoming common in the US: "I reckoned that if I was going to devote my life to building up something which wasn't mine, I deserved some form of commission", he reflected. The issue continued to linger in his mind, and Martin said he "nearly didn't sign" his spring 1962 contract renewal over this matter—even threatening EMI managing director L. G. ("Len") Wood that he would walk away from his job. (Note: At the same time as the contract dispute, Martin even took a work trip to Blackpool with his secretary, Judy Lockhart Smith. This trip led Wood to discover that Martin had been having an affair with Smith, which further irritated Wood.) With their relationship strained, Wood exacted a measure of revenge by having Martin sign the Beatles to a record contract to appease interest from EMI's publishing arm, Ardmore & Beechwood.

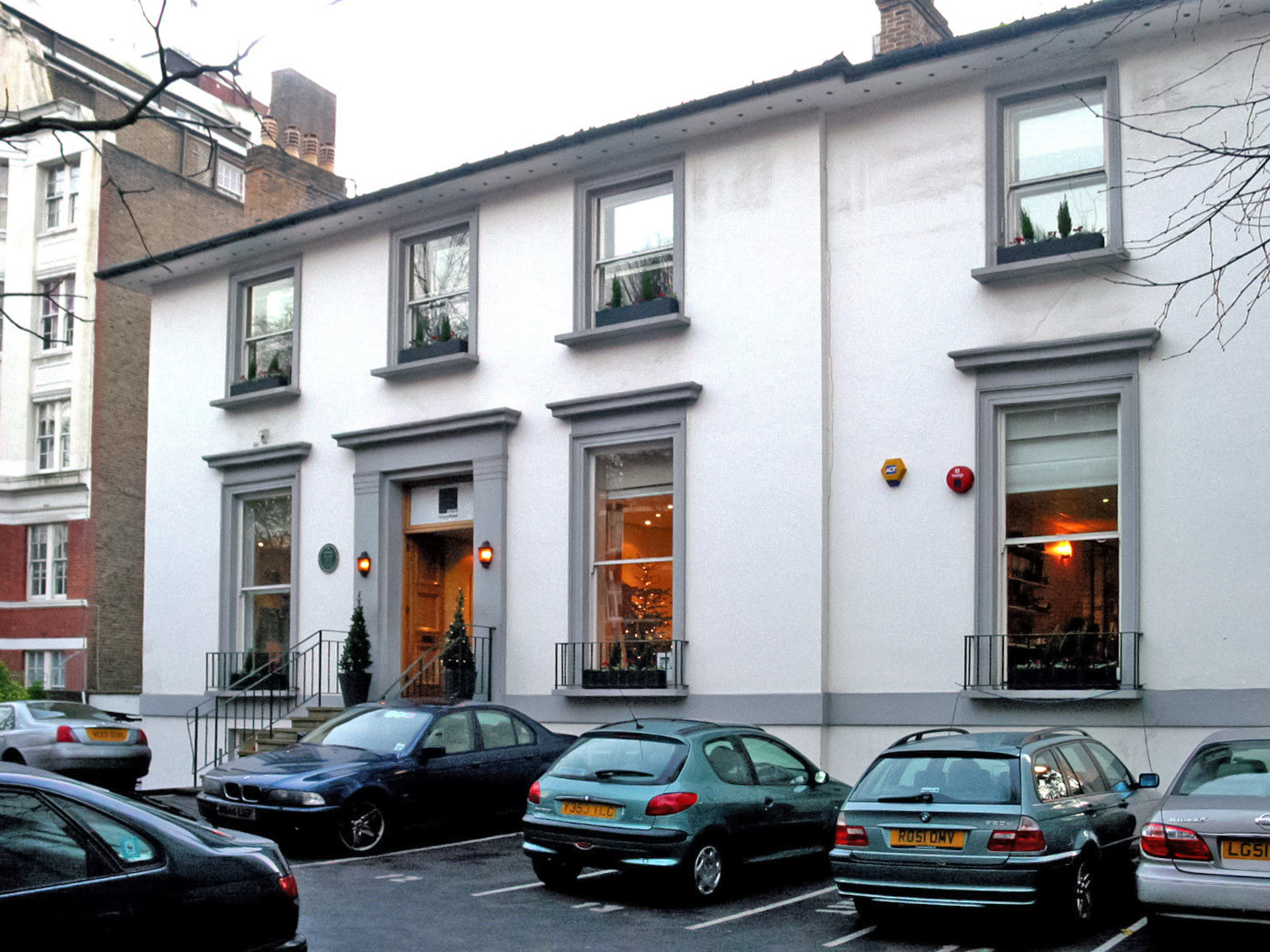
Abbey Road Studios, where Martin recorded Parlophone's artists

Martin also advocated that the Beatles' penny-per-record royalty rate be doubled; Wood agreed to this, but only if the Beatles signed a five-year contract renewal in exchange. When Martin countered that EMI should raise the royalty without conditions, Wood grudgingly acquiesced, but Martin believed that, "from that moment on, I was considered a traitor within EMI". (Note: Martin also maintained a rivalry with fellow A&R director Norrie Paramor, head of EMI's prominent Columbia label. Before Martin became one of Britain's most in-demand producers thanks to his work with the Beatles, he was envious that Paramor had produced highly successful pop acts, such as Cliff Richard. He admitted to looking with "something close to desperation" for similar success.) In 1955, EMI purchased American recording company Capitol Records. Thereafter, Capitol's head of international A&R, Dave Dexter Jr., chose to issue very few British records in the US, to Martin and his EMI A&R colleagues' dismay. Dexter passed on issuing the Beatles' first four singles in the US, driving Martin out of desperation to issue "She Loves You" on the small, independent Swan Records. (Note: Capitol finally agreed to release the Beatles' fifth single, "I Want to Hold Your Hand", only after Wood met Capitol president Alan W. Livingston in person in November 1963.) Martin and the Beatles also resented Capitol's practice of issuing records often highly divergent from British record releases, sometimes affecting album titles, cover art, songs included, and even Martin's production. This treatment did not cease until the band signed a new contract with EMI in January 1967.

==== Separation from EMI and start of Associated Independent Recording ====
After his repeated clashes over salary terms with EMI management, Martin informed them in June 1964 that he would not renew his contract in 1965. Though EMI managing director Len Wood attempted to persuade Martin to stay with the company, Martin continued to insist that he would not work for EMI without receiving a commission on record sales. Wood offered him a 3% commission minus "overhead costs", which would have translated to an £11,000 bonus for 1964, though, in doing so, Wood revealed to Martin that EMI had made £2.2 million in net profit from Martin's records that year. "With that simple sentence, he cut straight through whatever vestige of an umbilical cord still bound me to EMI. … I was flabbergasted", Martin observed. As Martin exited the company in August 1965, he recruited a number of other EMI staffers, including Norman Newell, Ron Richards, John Burgess, his wife, Judy, and Decca's Peter Sullivan. Artists associated with Martin's new production team included Adam Faith, Manfred Mann, Peter and Gordon, the Hollies, Tom Jones, and Engelbert Humperdinck.

Martin conceived of his new company as being modelled on the Associated London Scripts cooperative of comedy writers in the 1950s and 1960s, offering equal shares in the company to his A&R colleagues and expecting them to pay studio costs proportionate to their earnings. He named it Associated Independent Recording (AIR). Short of funds and with many of AIR's associated acts still under contract to EMI, Martin negotiated a business arrangement with EMI that would give EMI the right of first refusal on any AIR production. In exchange, EMI would pay a producer's royalty on all AIR records. Martin's departure from EMI and foundation of an independent production company was major news in the music press. Wood attempted to lure Martin back to EMI in 1969 with an offered salary of £25,000, but Martin rejected it.

=== The Beatles ===
==== Epstein approaches EMI ====
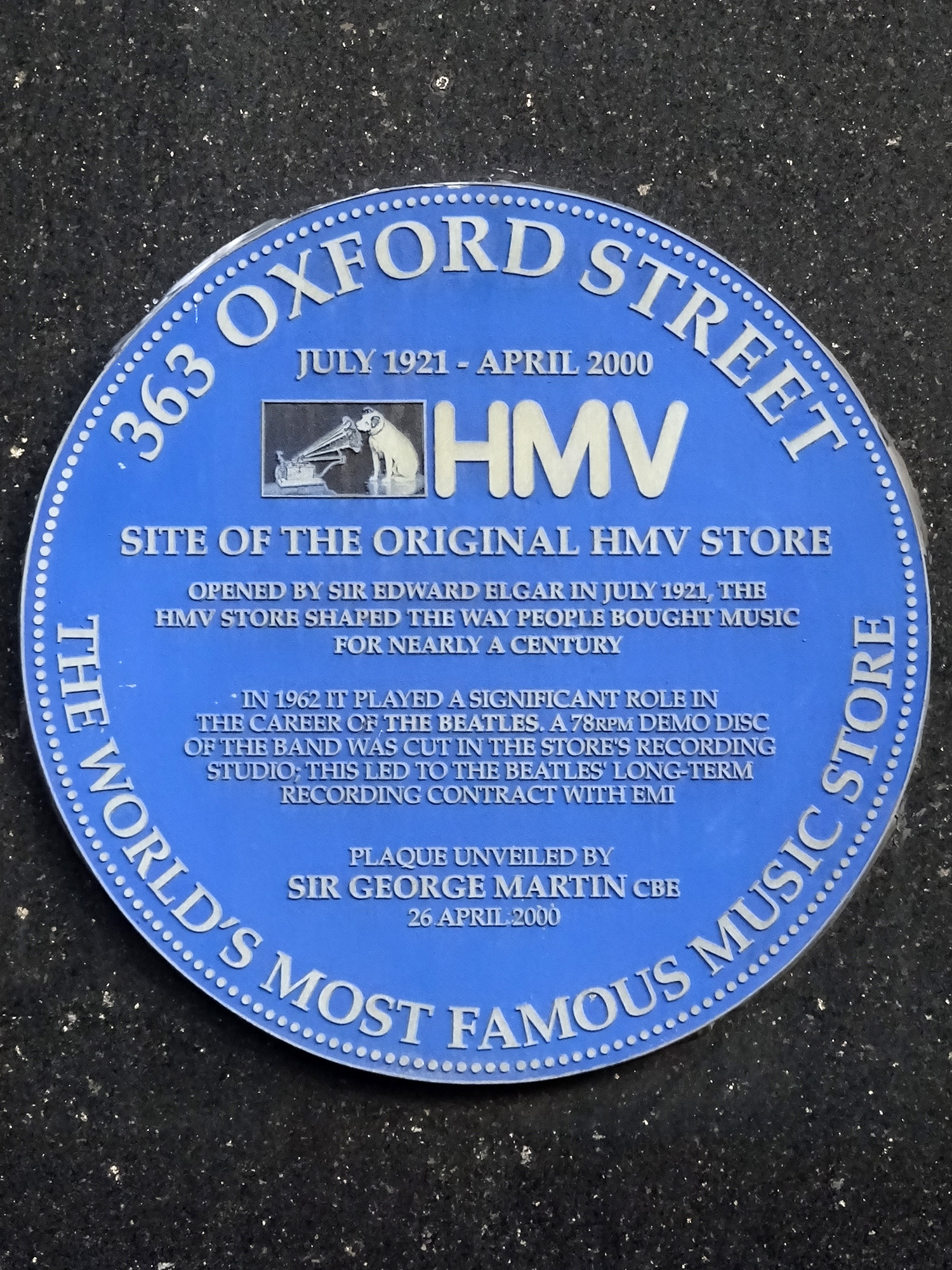
A plaque unveiled by Martin marking the location of a London office where EMI song publishers first heard Beatles demo recordings and pressed EMI to sign the group

In November 1961, the Beatles manager Brian Epstein travelled to London to meet with record executives from EMI and Decca Records in the interest of obtaining a recording contract for his band. Epstein met with EMI's general marketing director Ron White, with whom he had a longstanding business relationship, and left a copy of the Beatles' single with Tony Sheridan, "My Bonnie". White said he would play it for EMI's four A&R directors, including George Martin (though it later emerged that he neglected to do so, playing it only for two of them). In mid-December, White replied that EMI was not interested in signing the Beatles.

Martin claimed that he was contacted by Sid Colman of EMI music publisher Ardmore & Beechwood at the request of Epstein, though Colman's colleague Kim Bennett later disputed this. In any event, Martin arranged a meeting on 13 February 1962 with Epstein, who played for Martin the recording of the Beatles' failed January audition for Decca Records. Epstein recalled that Martin liked George Harrison's guitar playing and preferred Paul McCartney's singing voice to John Lennon's, though Martin himself recalled that he "wasn't knocked out at all" by the "lousy tape". With Martin apparently uninterested, Ardmore & Beechwood's Colman and Bennett pressured EMI management to sign the Beatles in hopes of gaining the rights to Lennon–McCartney song publishing on Beatle records; Colman and Bennett even offered to pay for the expense of the Beatles' first EMI recordings. EMI managing director Len Wood rejected this proposal. Nonetheless, to appease Colman's interest in the Beatles, Wood directed Martin to sign the group.

Martin met with Epstein again on 9 May at EMI Studios in London, and informed him he would give the Beatles a standard recording contract with Parlophone, to record a minimum of six tracks in the first year. The royalty rate was to be one penny for each record sold on 85% of records, which was to be split among the four members and Epstein. They agreed to hold the Beatles' first recording on 6 June 1962.

==== Early Beatles sessions (1962) ====
Though Martin later called the 6 June 1962 session at EMI's studio two an "audition", as he had never seen the band play before, the session was actually intended to record material for the first Beatles single. Ron Richards and his engineer Norman Smith recorded four songs: "Besame Mucho", "Love Me Do", "Ask Me Why", and "P.S. I Love You". Martin arrived during the recording of "Love Me Do"; between takes, he introduced himself to the Beatles and subtly changed the arrangement. The verdict was not promising, however, as Richards and Martin complained about Pete Best's drumming, and Martin thought their original songs were simply not good enough. In the control room, Martin asked the individual Beatles if there was anything they personally did not like, to which Harrison replied, "I don't like your tie." That was the turning point, according to Smith, as Lennon and McCartney joined in with jokes and comic wordplay, that made Martin think that he should sign them to a contract for their wit alone. After deliberating for a time whether to make Lennon or McCartney the lead vocalist of the group, Martin decided he would let them retain their shared lead role: "Suddenly it hit me that I had to take them as they were, which was a new thing. I was being too conventional."

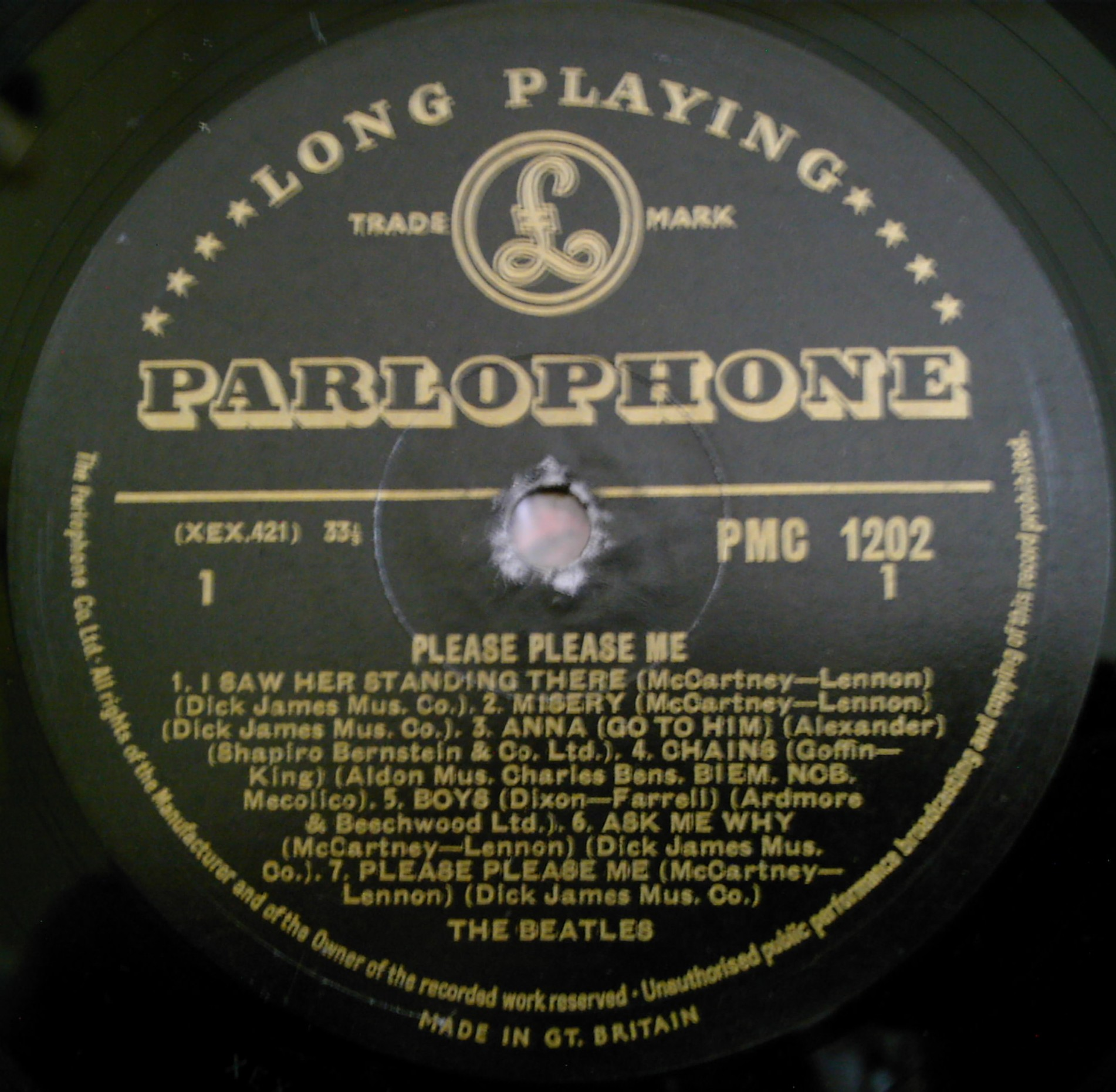
The Beatles' first LP, Please Please Me, produced by Martin

Though charmed by the Beatles' personalities, Martin was unimpressed with the musical repertoire from their first session. "I didn't think the Beatles had any song of any worth—they gave me no evidence whatsoever that they could write hit material", he said later. He arranged for the Beatles to record Mitch Murray's "How Do You Do It" at a September session, with the Beatles now featuring Ringo Starr on drums. (Note: However, Martin was dissatisfied with Starr's 4 September performance and resolved to use a session drummer for their next recording session. On 11 September, the Beatles recorded "Love Me Do" again and "P.S. I Love You" for the first time with the session musician Andy White playing drums. Starr, instead, was asked to play tambourine and maracas, and he complied. Martin later praised Starr's drumming, calling him "probably… the finest rock drummer in the world today".) The Beatles also re-recorded "Love Me Do" and played an early version of "Please Please Me", which Martin thought was "dreary" and needed to be sped up. While Martin pushed for "How Do You Do It" to be released, the band and Murray protested, so he decided to have "Love Me Do" issued as the A-side of the Beatles' first single and save "How Do You Do It" for another occasion. (Note: "How Do You Do It" would be recorded by Gerry and the Pacemakers and produced by Martin in 1963; it topped the British charts.)

Despite Martin's doubts about the song, "Love Me Do" steadily climbed in the British charts, peaking at number 17 in December 1962. With his doubts about the Beatles' songwriting abilities now quashed, Martin told the band they should re-record "Please Please Me" and make it their second single. He also suggested the Beatles record a full album, a suggestion Mark Lewisohn later deemed "genuinely mind-boggling", given how little exposure the Beatles had achieved so far. On 26 November, the Beatles attempted "Please Please Me" a third time. After the recording, Martin looked over the mixing desk and said, "Gentlemen, you have just made your first number one record".

==== Commercial breakout (1963–1964) ====
As Martin had predicted, "Please Please Me" reached no. 1 on most of the British singles charts upon its release in January 1963. "From that moment, we simply never stood still", he reflected. For the Beatles' first LP, Martin had the group record 10 new tracks to include with the four tracks already released. They accomplished this in one marathon recording session, on 11 February 1963, with the Beatles recording a mix of Lennon–McCartney originals and covers from their stage act. Nine days later, Martin overdubbed a piano part to the song "Misery" and a celesta on "Baby It's You". The resulting album, Please Please Me, became a huge success in the UK, spending 30 consecutive weeks at top of the charts, a feat no album bar one had accomplished by then.

I would meet them in the studio to hear a new number. I would perch myself on a high stool and John and Paul would stand around me with their acoustic guitars and play and sing it. … Then I would make suggestions to improve it and we'd try it again.

— George Martin

At this early stage of their working relationship, Martin played a major role in refining and arranging the Beatles' self-written songs to make them commercially appealing: "I taught them the importance of the hook. You had to get people's attention in the first ten seconds, and so I would generally get hold of their song and 'top and tail' it—make a beginning and end. And also make sure it ran for about two-and-a-half minutes so that it would fit DJs' programmes". He added that, at the beginning of his recording career with the band, his aim was to "[get] a really loud rhythm sound", manifested in "She Loves You". The Beatles' frenetic recording schedule continued in March 1963, as they recorded "From Me to You", "Thank You Girl", and an early version of "One After 909". Martin altered the arrangement of "From Me to You", substituting the Beatles' idea for a guitar intro with a vocalized "da-da-da-da-da-dum-dum-da", backed by overdubbed harmonica.

The Beatles returned to EMI Studios on 1 July to record a new single, "She Loves You". Martin liked the song but was sceptical of its closing chord, which he found clichéd. The Beatles, now increasingly confident in their songwriting, pushed back. Martin and the recording engineer Norman Smith changed the studio microphone arrangement for the song, giving the bass and drums a more prominent sound on the record. "She Loves You" was released in August and it would become the best-selling UK single by any artist in the 1960s. Around this time, the foundations for Beatlemania had been laid. Sometime in 1963, Martin and Brian Epstein arranged a loose formula to record two Beatles albums and four singles per year. The Beatles began work on their second LP on 18 July. Like their debut album, this record reflected the repertoire of the Beatles' contemporary stage act. Martin played piano on several of the tracks, including "Money (That's What I Want)" and "Not a Second Time", and also played Hammond organ on "I Wanna Be Your Man". With the Beatles came out in November 1963 and remained at no. 1 on the album charts for five months.

Martin and the Beatles recorded their next single, "I Want to Hold Your Hand" on 17 October—their first recording session with four-track recording. Impressed with the song, Martin merely suggested adding handclaps and adding compression to Lennon's rhythm guitar sound to imitate the sound of an organ. "I Want to Hold Your Hand" extended the Beatles' success to the US. Shortly after, he had the band record German-language versions of "She Loves You" and "I Want to Hold Your Hand" for the West German market. Martin travelled to New York with the Beatles on 7 February, as the band embarked on their first visit to America—including landmark performances on The Ed Sullivan Show.

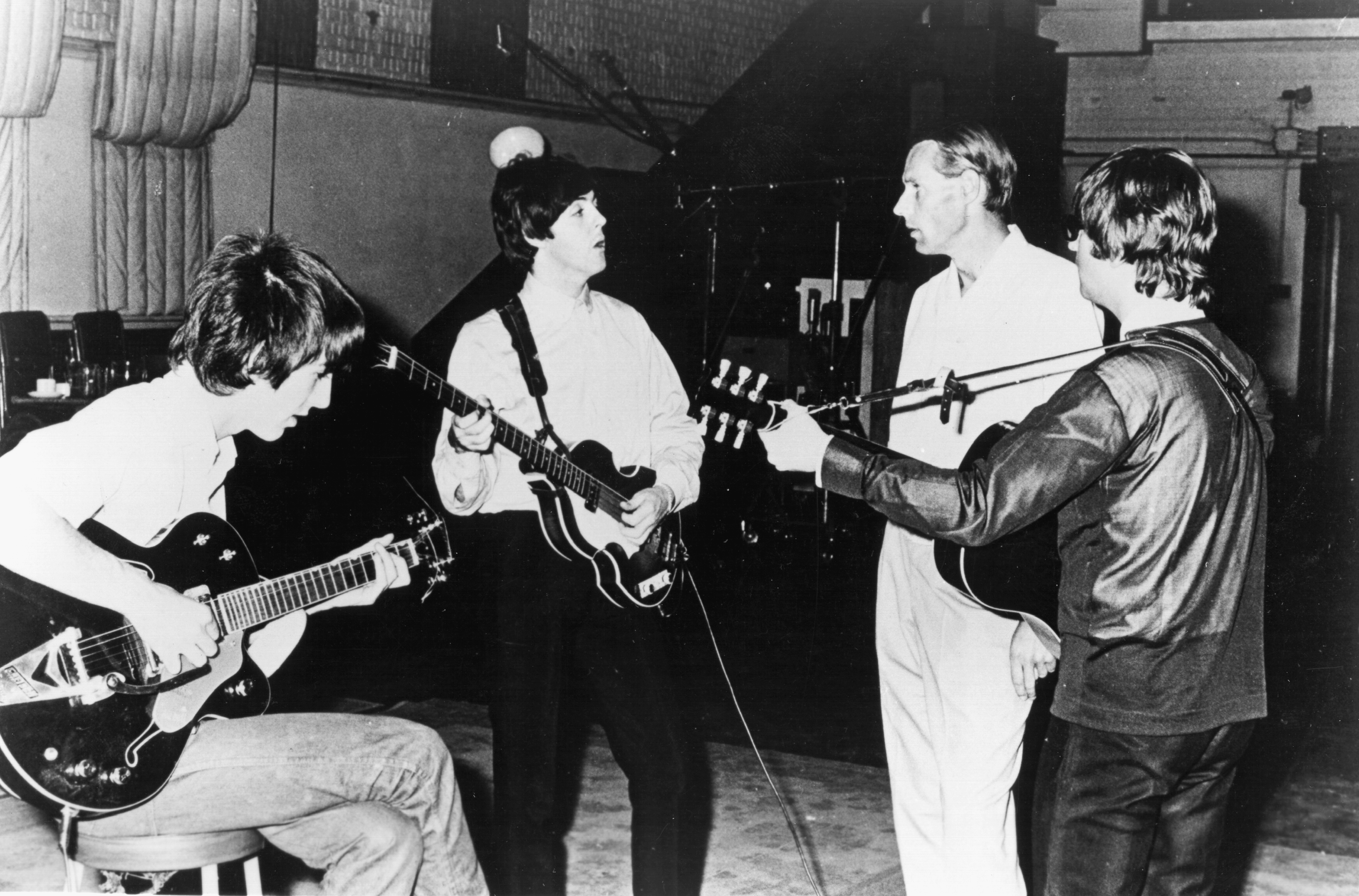
Martin working with the Beatles in EMI's Studio Two during the 1964 Beatles for Sale sessions

In late February, the band re-entered the studio and began recording the soundtrack album to the Beatles' upcoming untitled feature film. The film, album, and lead single were all titled A Hard Day's Night. In addition to producing the Beatles' songs for the album—their first not to feature any cover songs—Martin orchestrated several instrumental numbers for the film. The film was a success, and the album and single both reached no. 1 in the UK and US in July. Martin joined them for part of their August/September North American tour, recording their performance at the Hollywood Bowl. (Note: Overwhelming crowd noise made the recording unsuitable for release until, in 1977, Martin spliced some of the performances with others from their 1965 visit to the Hollywood Bowl; this was issued as The Beatles at the Hollywood Bowl.) The Beatles began recording their next studio album, Beatles for Sale in August, though the sessions continued intermittently through late October and the record was released in December. Martin observed that the Beatles were "war weary" during many of these sessions, and the album included six covers because Lennon and McCartney had not written enough songs to fill out the record. Beatles for Sale also featured new percussion sounds on several tracks, such as timpani and chocalho. The album reached no. 1 in the UK but was not released in the US.

==== Shift to studio experimenting (1965–1966) ====
In mid-February 1965, Martin and the Beatles began five months of sessions to record the music for their second film, Help!. The Beatles adopted new studio techniques for these sessions, typically overdubbing vocals and other sounds onto a carefully laid rhythm track. The group by now had grown confident in the studio, and Martin encouraged them to explore new ideas for songs, such as an outro to "Ticket to Ride" that was at a faster tempo than the rest of song. They continued to experiment with unusual instruments, such as an alto flute solo for "You've Got to Hide Your Love Away" scored by Martin. It was Martin's idea to score a string quartet accompaniment for "Yesterday" against McCartney's initial reluctance. Martin played the song in the style of Bach to show McCartney the voicings that were available. Help!, again, peaked at no. 1 in the UK and the US.

The group reconvened in October and November to record another album in time for the holiday shopping season. Rubber Soul continued the Beatles' experimentation with new sounds and contained several groundbreaking tracks. "Norwegian Wood (This Bird Has Flown)" featured Harrison on sitar, making it one of the first Western pop records to feature Indian instrumentation. The shimmering electric guitar sound on "Nowhere Man" was achieved by repeatedly reprocessing the signal to increase the treble frequencies, beyond the EQ limits permitted for EMI engineers. Martin himself recorded a baroque-style piano solo on Lennon's "In My Life", recording the tape at half-speed and playing it back at normal speed so the piano sounded like a harpsichord. Though Martin didn't play a harpsichord on the record, "In My Life" inspired other record producers to begin incorporating the instrument in their arrangements of pop records. Rubber Soul received strong critical acclaim upon its release and proved highly influential among the Beatles' musical contemporaries, such as the Beach Boys. Martin sensed a shift in how the group was recording albums:

I think Rubber Soul was the first of the albums that presented a new Beatles to the world. Up to this point we had been making albums that were rather like a collection of their singles. And now, we really were beginning to think about albums as a bit of art in their own right. We were thinking about the album as an entity of its own, and Rubber Soul was the first one to emerge in this way.

"Tomorrow Never Knows" (1966)
The author Mark Brend writes that, with Revolver, the Beatles employed the studio as "an environment for wide-ranging sonic research" that included extensive and groundbreaking experimentation.

The Beatles re-entered EMI Studios in April 1966, with the group's exploration of recording at Stax Records' studio in Memphis. The sessions of the Revolver album began with a highly experimental track, "Tomorrow Never Knows"—a Lennon song inspired by Timothy Leary's book The Psychedelic Experience. The song featured several innovations in pop recording, including the use of a tanpura drone loop throughout the song, a backwards guitar solo, sped-up tape loops, and artificial double tracking (ADT) on Lennon's vocal. (Note: Martin's joking technical description of ADT to Lennon coined the term flanging in music.) Martin worked closely with EMI engineers Geoff Emerick and Ken Townsend to achieve these radical effects. For Lennon's "I'm Only Sleeping", the recording was conducted at a fast tape speed and then slowed down to achieve a drowsy, dream-like sound, and "For No One" featured a French horn solo scored by Martin and played by Alan Civil. Furthermore, the Revolver sessions produced the single "Paperback Writer"/"Rain", with the former featuring three-part harmonies arranged by Martin and mixed to have a fluttering echo sound. Revolver was released in August to highly favourable critical reaction, particularly in the UK. Retrospective criticism has recognized it as being among the finest pop albums ever made, with numerous critics deeming it the very best.

==== Sgt. Pepper (1966–1967) ====
By the time of Pepper, the Beatles had immense power at Abbey Road. So did I. They used to ask for the impossible, and sometimes they would get it. At the beginning of their recording career, I used to boss them about. ... By the time we got to Pepper, though, that had all changed. I was very much the collaborator. Their ideas were coming through thick and fast, and they were brilliant. All I did was help make them real.

— George Martin

By the time the Beatles resumed recording on 24 November 1966, they had decided to discontinue touring and focus their creative energies on the recording studio. Martin reflected, "the time had come for experiment. The Beatles knew it, and I knew it." Their late 1966 sessions stretched into April 1967, forming what became Sgt. Pepper's Lonely Hearts Club Band—a record continuing the Beatles' and Martin's imaginative use of the studio to create new sounds on record. He was involved as an arranger throughout the album, except for "She's Leaving Home". (Note: While this was the first Beatles song that Martin did not arrange, as he had a prior engagement, he still produced the recording and conducted the orchestra himself. Still, Martin called this "one of the biggest hurts of my life".)

For "Within You Without You", Martin arranged a score that combined Indian and Western classical music. He used vari-speed editing to alter the recording speed of several of the album's vocal tracks, including "Lucy in the Sky with Diamonds". He and Geoff Emerick superimposed crowd noise sound effects onto the title track and crossfaded the song into "With a Little Help from My Friends", mimicking a live performance. Martin also played instruments on several songs, including the piano on "Lovely Rita", the harpsichord on "Fixing a Hole", and numerous instruments on "Being for the Benefit of Mr. Kite!": the harmonium, organ, and perhaps the glockenspiel. For the song's circus-themed instrumental breaks, he had engineers cut tapes of numerous carnival-instrument recordings into tape fragments, then reassemble them at random. Martin applied heavy tape echo to Lennon's voice in "A Day in the Life". Additionally, he worked with McCartney to implement the 24-bar orchestral climaxes in the middle and end of the song, produced by instructing a 45-piece orchestra to gradually play from their instruments' lowest note to their highest.

Sgt. Pepper cost £25,000 to produce (equivalent to £398,000 in 2025), far more than any previous Beatles record. When the album was finally released in early June 1967, it received widespread acclaim from music critics, with a Times critic deeming it "a decisive moment in the history of Western civilisation". The Beatles historian Jonathan Gould writes that it received "the most momentous public reception that had ever been given to a popular recording." Sgt. Pepper's accolades also raised Martin's public profile as a record producer, and contemporary musicians sought to copy its production methods. This augmented the producer's role in popular music. Thus, Lennon and McCartney complained that Martin had received too much attention for his part in Sgt Pepper's, beginning a feeling of resentment by the band towards him. According to Emerick, with the album's recording sessions, McCartney emerged as the Beatles' de facto producer, as Martin was increasingly absent near the end of prolonged sessions.

During the Sgt. Pepper sessions, the Beatles worked on Lennon's "Strawberry Fields Forever", which began as a simple arrangement of guitar, drums, and Mellotron. They would remake the song in a new key and tempo and with much added instrumentation. Lennon asked Martin to combine takes 7 and 26 of the song, even though they were recorded at different tempos and in different keys. Martin, Ken Townsend, and Emerick accomplished Lennon's unusual request by carefully speeding up take 7 and slowing down take 26 so they were nearly equal in key and tempo. Martin mixed the track to include a false ending. Soon after, the band began work on McCartney's "Penny Lane", which featured a piccolo trumpet solo that was requested by McCartney. McCartney hummed the melody that he wanted, and Martin notated it for the trumpeter David Mason. Martin also orchestrated a larger brass and woodwind score with trumpets, piccolo, flutes, oboe, and flugelhorn. In February, the group issued "Strawberry Fields Forever"/"Penny Lane" as a double A-side. The single drew critical praise for its musical and recording inventiveness, but it proved the first British Beatles single in four years not to top the charts, instead reaching no. 2. Martin blamed himself for weakening the forthcoming album by caving in to external pressure for a standalone single and called it "the biggest mistake of my professional life".

==== Magical Mystery Tour, "All You Need Is Love", and Yellow Submarine (1967–1968) ====
I tended to lay back on Magical Mystery Tour and let them have their head. Some of the sounds weren't very good. Some were brilliant, but some were bloody awful.

— George Martin

Before Sgt Pepper was even released, the Beatles held several sessions from April to June 1967 to record additional songs for a yet-to-be-determined purpose: "Magical Mystery Tour", and "Baby, You're a Rich Man", among others. Martin later described many of these sessions as lacking the strong creative focus the band had displayed in recording Sgt. Pepper. Showing less interest, he came uncharacteristically unprepared for the "Magical Mystery Tour" trumpet overdub session on 3 May, forcing the session musicians to improvise a score for themselves. On 27 August, the Beatles manager Brian Epstein died of an accidental drug overdose, devastating the band and Martin. McCartney urged the group to focus on the Magical Mystery Tour film project, and they resumed recording with Lennon's "I Am the Walrus". For this song, which Martin initially disliked but grew to appreciate, he provided a quirky and original arrangement for brass, violins, cellos, and the Mike Sammes Singers vocal ensemble singing nonsense phrases. Much of the fruit of these sessions went to Magical Mystery Tour, released as an EP in the UK in December 1967 and an LP in the US in late November; it reached no. 2 and no. 1 on those charts, respectively.

In May 1967, Epstein agreed to have the group record a song live on the world's first live global television broadcast, Our World. The band decided to record Lennon's "All You Need Is Love" for the occasion. Martin believed it was too risky to record the entire track on the live broadcast, so he had the Beatles record a backing track on 14 June at Olympic Studios—with the unusual arrangement of Lennon on harpsichord, McCartney on double bass, Harrison on violin, and Starr on drums, with Eddie Kramer as audio engineer. The band also asked Martin to write an orchestral score, starting with the beginning of "La Marseillaise" and ending with a fade-out with bits from Johann Sebastian Bach's Inventions and Sinfonias, "Greensleeves", and "In the Mood". Despite some technical glitches, the Beatles, the orchestra, and the assembled crowd of Beatles friends recorded what Kenneth Womack deems a seamless live take of the song to an audience of hundreds of millions. "All You Need Is Love" was quickly released as a single, the first Beatles single on which Martin received a written credit as producer.

In early 1967, Epstein and the media producer Al Brodax signed a contract to have the Beatles provide four original songs to support an animated feature film, Yellow Submarine. The Beatles were initially contemptuous of the project, planning to relegate only their weakest songs to the soundtrack. Some, such as "All Together Now", were recorded without Martin's involvement. However, he did compose the film's orchestral scores, which comprises the second half of the film's soundtrack album. He claimed to take inspiration for the score from Maurice Ravel, "the musician I admire most". The Yellow Submarine film debuted on 17 July 1968 and was favourably received by critics. (Note: However, Martin chose to re-record the album's score after the film's release, delaying the soundtrack's release until January 1969.)

==== Conflict and final years (1968–1970) ====
By the time of the White Album sessions in mid-1968, Martin found himself in competition with Apple Electronics's eccentric inventor, Magic Alex, for the Beatles' interest in studio production. The Beatles grew increasingly hostile toward each other. Additionally, the Beatles began recording lengthy, repetitive rehearsal tracks in the studio. With all these disruptions to their studio dynamic, Martin consciously stayed in the background of many sessions, reading stacks of newspapers in the control booth until his guidance or assistance was sought. For instance, when he gave McCartney suggestions for his vocal part on "Ob-La-Di, Ob-La-Da", and McCartney chastised him, he shouted in reply: "Then bloody sing it again! I give up. I just don't know any better how to help you". Parts of the White Album sessions required Martin and his engineers to attend to simultaneous recordings in different studios, such as an occasion when Lennon was working on "Revolution 9" in Studio Three, while McCartney recorded "Blackbird" in Studio Two. Martin scored a fiddle arrangement on Starr's first composition, "Don't Pass Me By", as well as brass arrangements on "Revolution 1", "Honey Pie", "Savoy Truffle", and "Martha My Dear". He also played celesta on "Good Night" and harmonium on "Cry Baby Cry". Martin recommended the Beatles choose the best few tracks from the sessions and issue a standard LP, but they instead went with a double album. The album was released in November to strong commercial and critical success, reaching no. 1 in the UK and US for eight and nine weeks, respectively.

In early January 1969, the Beatles gathered at Twickenham Film Studios to compose and record new material for a live album. The group sought a raw, unedited sound for the album, with Lennon telling Martin that he did not want any "production shit". The band's working relationships faltered during these sessions, with Harrison quitting the group for several days out of frustration. (Note: Martin later admitted he had contributed to Harrison's status as a "second-class" Beatle.) Martin chose not to attend many of these tense, aimless sessions, leaving balance engineer Glyn Johns to act as de facto producer. In mid-January, the Beatles relocated their work to the basement studio of Apple Records at 3 Savile Row, where their work ethic and mood improved. While these so-called Get Back sessions were underway, they and the keyboardist Billy Preston performed on the roof of Apple Records on 30 January 1969, which resulted in recordings of five new tracks. The next day, the band returned to the basement studio to record several more, including "Let It Be" and "The Long and Winding Road".

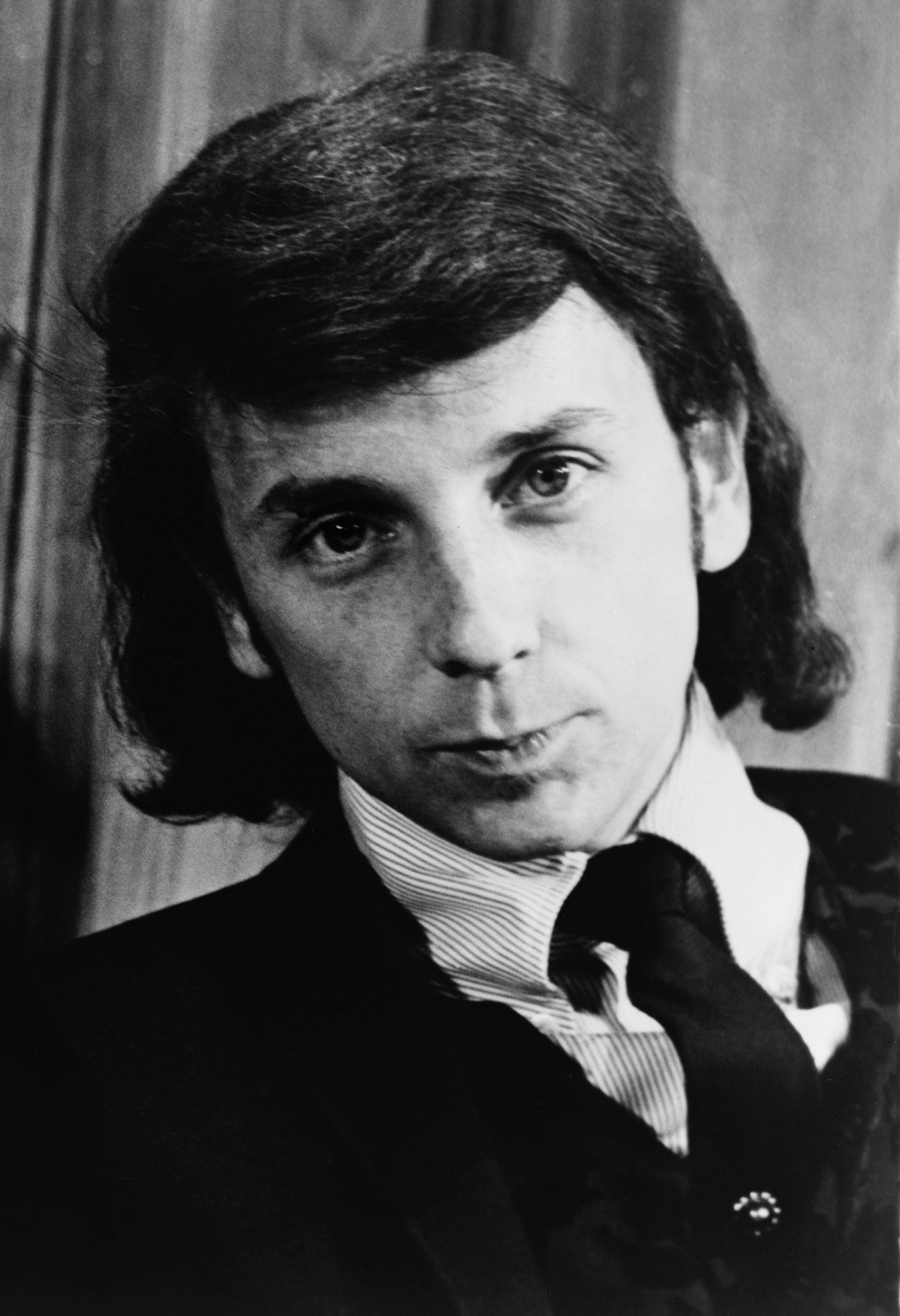
Phil Spector, who altered the production of Let It Be and is formally credited as the album's producer

In March 1969, the Beatles rejected Glyn Johns' proposed mix for a Get Back LP, scuttling hopes for a public release in the near term. In May, Martin and Johns worked together on another mix of Get Back—which the Beatles also rejected. Martin began at this time to consider that the Beatles might be finished as a commercial act. The Beatles rejected yet another Johns mix of the album in January 1970. Martin supervised the final Beatles recording session (without Lennon) on 3 January 1970, when the group recorded "I Me Mine". In March and April 1970, Phil Spector remixed the album—now known as Let It Be—and added orchestral and choral overdubs to several tracks. Martin, along with McCartney, was critical of these embellishments, calling them "so uncharacteristic of the clean sounds the Beatles had always used". The album was finally released in May 1970, after McCartney had publicly announced he was leaving the Beatles. When EMI informed Martin that he would not get a production credit because Spector produced the final version, Martin commented, "I produced the original, and what you should do is have a credit saying 'Produced by George Martin, over-produced by Phil Spector'."

The first song for what became the Abbey Road album was recorded in February 1969 without Martin. The band did not inform Martin they planned to record a new album until later in the spring when McCartney asked if he would produce it for them. "Only if you let me produce it the way we used to", he replied; McCartney agreed. In fact, the Abbey Road sessions marked Martin's return to prominence in the studio. Martin's first session came on 5 May, when he supervised overdubs to Harrison's "Something". He soon set to help the Beatles develop the second side of the album into a symphonic "medley" of songs, akin to a rock opera. Martin guided the band using his knowledge of classical music to conceive a fluid, cohesive series of songs with repeating themes and motifs. Along with an electric harpsichord accompaniment to "Because", Martin composed and orchestrated orchestral arrangements for four of the album's songs. In September 1969, Abbey Road was released to great commercial success but mixed critical reception, partially owing to what was perceived as a synthetic sound. Martin took particular pride in the medley, later claiming, "There's far more of me on Abbey Road than on any of their other albums". As notes the critic Ian MacDonald, "After Abbey Road, the group was effectively dead," and McCartney announced the band's break-up a few months later.

=== Post-breakup Beatles work ===
==== Beatle solo records ====
Martin produced the first solo album by a member of the Beatles after John Lennon had privately announced he was leaving the group, Ringo Starr's March 1970 standards album, Sentimental Journey. Throughout the next three decades, he collaborated with Paul McCartney extensively for the latter's studio albums and compositions. After scoring some orchestral arrangements for the 1971 album Ram, Martin produced Wings' "Live and Let Die" theme song for the 1973 James Bond film of the same name, They reunited in 1980 to record "We All Stand Together", a song for a Rupert Bear animated short film. He produced the critically and commercially acclaimed Tug of War (1982), as well as Pipes of Peace (1983). For the latter's lead single, "Say Say Say" (a duet between McCartney and Michael Jackson), Martin scored a horn arrangement. He also produced the soundtrack album to McCartney's 1984 film Give My Regards to Broad Street. Though the film was poorly received, the soundtrack reached no. 1 in the UK. In the 1990s, he recorded orchestral overdubs for McCartney's singles "Put It There" (1990), "C'Mon People" (1993), and his album Flaming Pie (1997). In 1998, at Yoko Ono's request, Martin scored an orchestral arrangement to the 1980 Lennon demo of "Grow Old with Me".

==== The Beatles Anthology ====
Martin oversaw post-production on The Beatles Anthology project in 1994 and 1995, working again with Geoff Emerick. Martin decided to use an old 8-track analogue mixing console to mix the songs for the project instead of a modern digital console. In his view, the old console created a distinct sound which a new one could not accurately reproduce. He said he found the project a strange experience, as they had to listen to themselves chatting in the studio, 25 to 30 years previously. However, he was not involved in producing the two new songs reuniting McCartney, Harrison, and Starr: the Lennon demos "Free as a Bird" and "Real Love". Though Martin's hearing loss was publicly cited as the rationale, he was not asked by the band members to produce the tracks; Jeff Lynne performed these duties instead.

==== Cirque du Soleil and Love ====
In 2006, Martin and his son, Giles Martin, remixed 80 minutes of Beatles music for the Las Vegas stage performance Love, a joint venture between Cirque du Soleil and the Beatles' Apple Corps Ltd. A soundtrack album from the show was released that same year. As part of his contribution to the soundtrack album, Martin orchestrated a score for a demo version of "While My Guitar Gently Weeps"; the orchestra session, recorded at AIR Lyndhurst Hall, was his final orchestral production. Martin received the 2008 Grammy Awards for Best Compilation Soundtrack Album and Best Surround Sound Album.

=== Independent projects and work with other artists ===
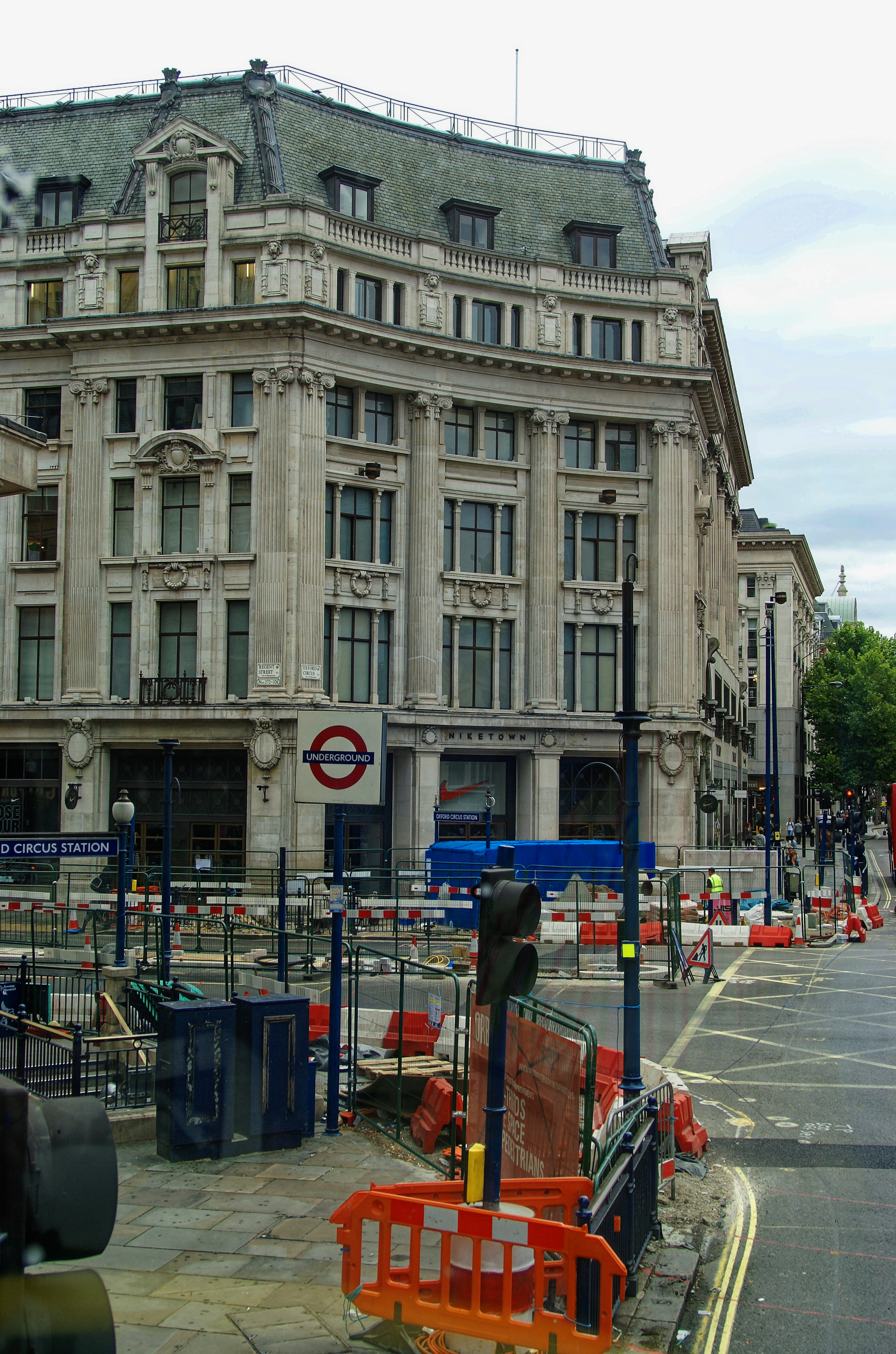
Oxford Circus, where Martin's AIR London studio was based

Martin's early work under his new Associated Independent Recording (AIR) banner included Cilla Black's rendition of Burt Bacharach's "Alfie", which made no. 6 in the UK, and musical scores for Lionel Bart's much-maligned Twang!! theatrical production. He also reunited with other artists from his Parlophone days, such as Matt Monro and Ron Goodwin, though these reunions often failed to produce the same success as earlier records had. Martin continued to produce novelty music acts, such as The Master Singers and the Scaffold. Other artists that Martin worked with include the singers Celine Dion, Kenny Rogers, Yoshiki, and Neil Sedaka, the guitarists Jeff Beck, John McLaughlin, and John Williams, and the bands Seatrain, Ultravox, and Cheap Trick. Martin produced seven albums for America, which included the hits "Tin Man", "Lonely People", and "Sister Golden Hair". As the band's Gerry Beckley said in a 2017 interview, "He was really great at keeping us focused and moving forward." In 1997, Martin produced "Candle in the Wind 1997", Elton John's tribute single to Diana, Princess of Wales, which became the best-selling British single of all time. It was also Martin's final production of a single.

In 1988, Martin produced an album version of the play Under Milk Wood, with music by Martin, Elton John, and Mark Knopfler; Anthony Hopkins played the part of "First Voice". In 1992, Martin worked with Pete Townshend on the musical stage production of The Who's Tommy. The play opened on Broadway in 1993, with the original cast album being released that summer. For this, Martin won the 1993 Grammy Award for Best Musical Show Album. In 1998, Martin released an album of Beatles covers titled In My Life.

In October 1970, Martin and his AIR partners opened their first company studio at the top of the Peter Robinson building in Oxford Circus, London. Nine years later, he opened another studio, AIR Montserrat, on the Caribbean island of Montserrat. This studio was destroyed by a hurricane ten years later.

On 15 September 1997, Martin arranged a benefit concert for the island of Montserrat, which had been devastated by volcanic activity. The event, Music for Montserrat, featured Paul McCartney, Elton John, Sting, Phil Collins, Eric Clapton, Jimmy Buffett, and Carl Perkins. Martin served as a consultant to the June 2002 Party at the Palace at Buckingham Palace Garden for the Queen's Golden Jubilee. In 2010, he was the executive producer of the hard rock debut of Arms of the Sun, a project featuring Rex Brown, King Diamond, Lance Harvill, and Ben Bunker.

== Other work ==
=== Film scores ===
Beginning in the late 1950s, Martin began to supplement his producer income by publishing music and having his artists record it. (Note: He used the pseudonyms Lezlo Anales and John Chisholm, before settling on Graham Fisher as his primary pseudonym.) His second wife, Judy, whose father was chairman of the Film Producers Guild, contributed to his film work. Martin's earliest composing work was incidental music to accompany Peter Sellers' comedy records. In 1966, he signed a long-term deal with United Artists to write instrumental music. Martin composed, arranged, and produced film scores beginning in the early 1960s, including those of A Hard Day's Night (1964), Yellow Submarine (1968), as well as an instrumental for Ferry Cross the Mersey (1965). Martin produced two James Bond themes: Shirley Bassey's "Goldfinger" (1964), and Paul McCartney and Wings' "Live and Let Die" (1973), as well as the score to Live and Let Die. Martin was commissioned to write an official opening theme for BBC Radio 1's launch in September 1967. Entitled "Theme One", it was the first piece of music, but not the first record, heard on Radio 1.

In November 2017, the Craig Leon-produced album George Martin – Film Scores and Original Orchestral Music was released. The album of new recordings collected a selection of Martin's compositions together, including previously unheard sketches from the feature film The Mission (1986) which were not used in the original soundtrack.

=== Television ===
Martin hosted a three-part BBC co-produced documentary series titled The Rhythm of Life, which aired in 1997 on Ovation. Here, he discusses various aspects of musical composition with professional musicians and singers, among them Brian Wilson, Mark Knopfler, and Burt Bacharach. In April 2011, a 90-minute documentary feature film co-produced by the BBC Arena team, Produced by George Martin, aired to critical acclaim for the first time in the UK. It tells the life story of how Martin, a schoolboy growing up in the Great Depression, grew up to become a legendary music producer. Mark Lewisohn curated an accompanying six-volume musical box set. He also contributed to the 2016 documentary Soundbreaking, a history of recorded music featuring over 160 interviews with influential artists and producers.

== Artistry and legacy ==
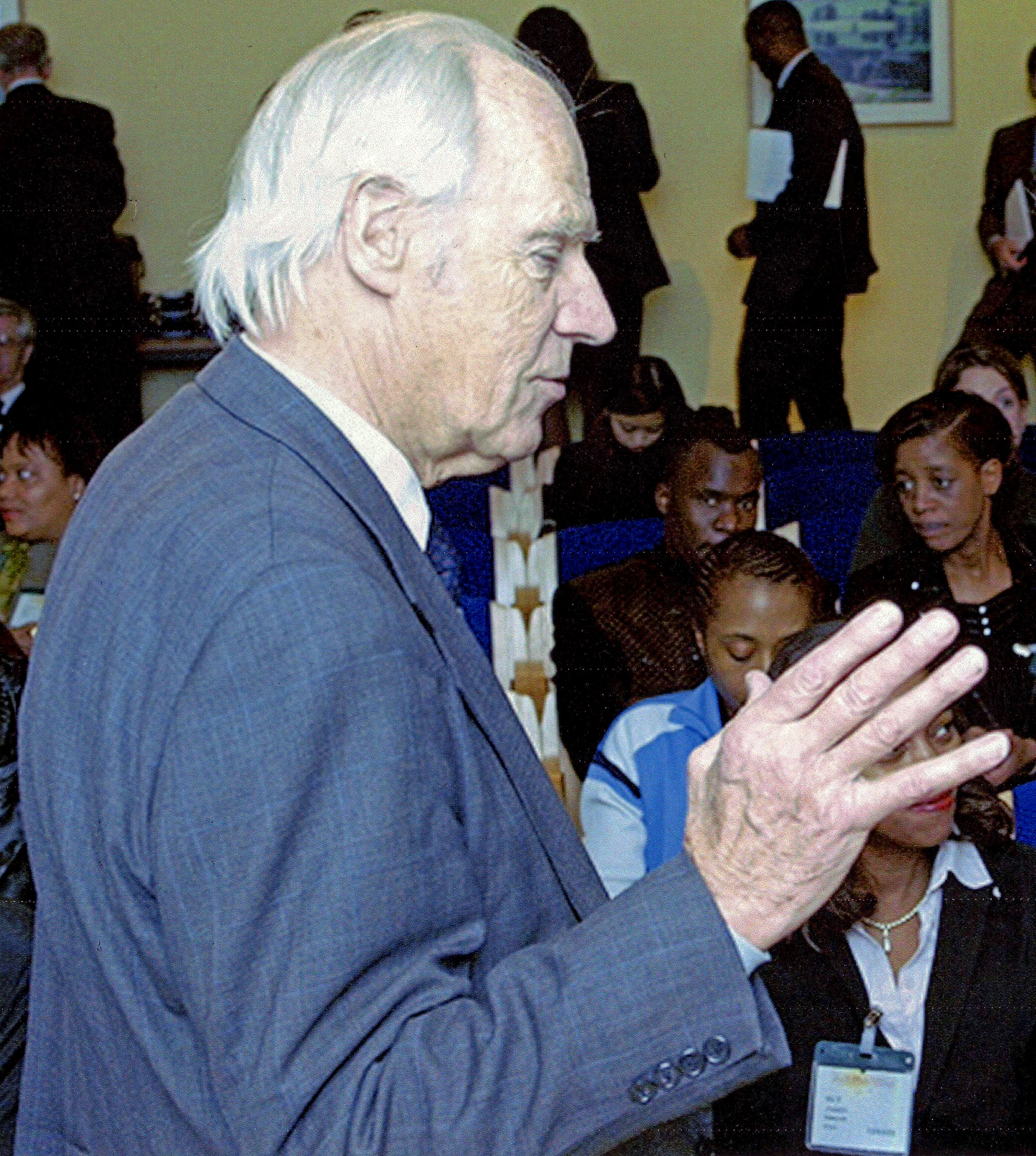
Martin in 2007

In his Parlophone days, Martin frequently used comedy records to experiment with recording techniques and motifs used later on musical records, such as recording magnetic tape at half-speed and then playing it back at normal speed. He would use this effect on several Beatles records, such as his sped-up piano solo on "In My Life". In particular, Martin was curious to see how tape offered advantages over existing technologies favoured by EMI: "It was still in its infancy, and a lot of people at the studio regarded tape with suspicion. But we gradually learnt all about it, and working with the likes of Sellers and Milligan was very useful, because, as it wasn't music, you could experiment. ... We made things out of tape loops, slowed things down, and banged on piano lids."

Martin was one of a handful of producers to have number-one records in three or more consecutive decades (1960s, 1970s, 1980s, and 1990s).

=== With the Beatles ===
BBC News notes that Martin's formal musical expertise and interest in novel recording practices facilitated the group's rudimentary musical education and desire for new musical sounds to record.

Martin's contribution to the Beatles' led to him being described as the "fifth Beatle". In 2016, Paul McCartney wrote that "If anyone earned the title of the fifth Beatle it was George". Julian Lennon called Martin "the fifth Beatle, without question". In the immediate aftermath of the Beatles' break-up, a time when he made many angry utterances, John Lennon trivialised Martin's importance to the Beatles' music and claimed that he took too much credit for the Beatles' music. In a 1971 letter responding to a Melody Maker interview with Martin, Lennon wrote, "When people ask me questions about 'What did George Martin really do for you?,' I have only one answer, 'What does he do now?' I noticed you had no answer for that!" However, that same year, Lennon said, "George Martin made us what we were in the studio. He helped us develop a language to talk to other musicians."

== Personal life ==
In 1946, Martin met Jean ("Sheena") Chisholm, a fellow member of the Royal Navy's choir. They bonded over their mutual love of music. Martin's mother, Bertha, strongly disapproved of Chisholm as a partner for Martin, fuelling early strain in the relationship. Nevertheless, they were married at the University of Aberdeen on 3 January 1948. Bertha died three weeks later of a brain haemorrhage, and Martin felt responsible for his mother's death. Martin and Sheena had two children, Alexis (born 1953) and Gregory Paul (born 1957). Around 1955, the Martins moved from London and bought a home in the development town of Hatfield, Hertfordshire, some 20 miles north. By the early 1960s, Martin pleaded Chisholm for a divorce and moved out of their home, but she refused, citing her childcare needs. Their divorce was finalized in February 1965.

On his first day of work at EMI Studios in 1950, Martin met Judy Lockhart Smith, a secretary to Parlophone director Oscar Preuss. Martin chose to retain her as a secretary when he assumed the direction of Parlophone in 1955, and they commuted together from Hatfield each day. Martin and Lockhart Smith began a discreet affair in the late 1950s. They married on 24 June 1966 at the Marylebone Registry Office, and had two children, Lucie (born 1967) and Giles (born 1969).

Martin was firm friends with Spike Milligan, and was best man at Milligan's second wedding: "I loved The Goon Show, and issued an album of it on my label Parlophone, which is how I got to know Spike." The album was Bridge on the River Wye, a spoof of the film The Bridge on the River Kwai, being based on the 1957 Goon Show episode "An African Incident".

In the mid-1970s, Martin's hearing started to decline; in an interview with the Institute of Professional Sound, he stated that he first noticed it when realizing that he couldn't detect high frequencies that an engineer was using to evaluate tonality. Giles consequently served as an impromptu assistant and helped George hide the condition as it worsened over the next two decades. Martin attributed his hearing loss to his constant production work, stating that "I was in the studio for 14 hours at a stretch, and never let my ears repair. There's no question that listening to loud music was a major contribution to my hearing loss." By 2014, he relied on a combination of hearing aids and lip-reading to communicate face to face.

Martin spent his later years with Lockhart Smith at their home in Coleshill, Oxfordshire. He died there on 8 March 2016, aged 90. While the cause of his death was not immediately disclosed, his biographer, Kenneth Womack, later attributed it to complications from stomach cancer. He was buried near All Saints Church in Coleshill. A memorial service was held on 11 May at St Martin-in-the-Fields, attended by, among others, Paul McCartney, Ringo Starr, Yoko Ono, Olivia Harrison, Elton John, Bernard Cribbins, and former colleagues.

== Awards and recognition ==
Organisation	Year	Honour	Result	Ref.
Grammy Award	1967	Best Contemporary Album (Note: As producer of Sgt. Pepper's Lonely Hearts Club Band)	Won	
Grammy Award	1967	Album of the Year	Won	
Grammy Award	1973	Best Arrangement, Instrumental and Vocals (Note: As arranger of "Live and Let Die")	Won	
BRIT Awards	1977	Best British Producer of the past 25 years	Won	
BRIT Awards	1984	Outstanding Contribution to Music	Won	
Queen Elizabeth II	1988	Commander of the Most Excellent Order of the British Empire	Honoured	
Berklee College of Music	1989	Honorary Doctorate in Music	Honoured	
Grammy Award	1993	Best Musical Show Album (Note: As arranger of The Who's Tommy)	Won	
Queen Elizabeth II	1996	Knighted	Honoured	
British Phonographic Industry	1998	Man of the Year	Honoured	
Rock and Roll Hall of Fame	1999	Inducted into the Rock and Roll Hall of Fame	Honoured	
Confédération Internationale des Sociétés d'Auteurs et Compositeurs	2002	Gold Medal	Honoured	
World Soundtrack Awards	2002	World Soundtrack Lifetime Achievement Award	Won	
College of Arms	2004	Coat of arms	Honoured	
Leeds Beckett University	2006	Honorary Doctorate in Music	Honoured	
UK Music Hall of Fame	2006	Inducted into the UK Music Hall of Fame	Honoured	
Grammy Award	2007	Best Compilation Soundtrack Album For Motion Picture, Television Or Other Visual Media (Note: As producer of Love, shared with Giles Martin)	Won	
Grammy Award	2007	Best Surround Sound Album (Note: As surround producer of Love, shared with Giles Martin, Paul Hicks, and Tim Young)	Won	
Lund University	2010	Honorary Doctorate in Music	Honoured	
Audio Engineering Society	2010	Honorary membership	Honoured	
University of Oxford	2011	Honorary Doctorate in Music	Honoured	
British Academy of Songwriters, Composers and Authors	2012	Gold Badge Award	Honoured	

Coat of arms of George Martin
Crest (upon a Helm with a wreath Argent and Azure): A House Martin proper holding under the sinister wing a Recorder in bend sinister mouthpiece downwards Or. Escutcheon Azure on a Fess nebuly Argent between three Stag Beetles Or five Barrulets Sable. Badge A Zebra statant proper supporting with the dexter foreleg over the shoulder an Abbot's Crozier Or.

== Selected discography ==
Over his career, Martin produced 30 number-one singles and 16 number-one albums in the UK, in addition to a then-record 23 number-one singles and 19 number-one albums in the US (most of which were by the Beatles).

=== Non-Beatles works produced or co-produced ===
- "Barwick Green", Sidney Torch (1951)
- "The White Suit Samba", Jack Parnell (1951)
- "Ae Fond Kiss", Kenneth McKellar (1952)
- "Bluebell Polka", Jimmy Shand (1952)
- "Melody on the Move", Tommy Reilly (1952)
- "Mock Mozart", Peter Ustinov (1952)
- The Lark Ascending, Adrian Boult / Jean Pougnet / London Philharmonic Orchestra (1952)
- "Arrivederci Darling", Edna Savage (1955)
- "Earth Angel", The Southlanders (1955)
- "Pickin' a Chicken", Eve Boswell (1955)
- "Robin Hood", Dick James (1956)
- "Rock-A-Beatin' Boogie", The Ivor and Basil Kirchin Band (1956)
- "Experiments With Mice", John Dankworth (1956)
- "Glendora", Glen Mason (1956)
- "Nellie the Elephant", Mandy Miller (1956)
- "Smiley", Shirley Abicair (1956)
- "The Shifting Whispering Sands", Eamonn Andrews (1956)
- "Be My Girl", Jim Dale (1957)
- "Don't You Rock Me Daddy-O", The Vipers Skiffle Group (1957)
- "The Hippopotamus Song", Ian Wallace (1957)
- Charlie Drake, "Splish Splash" (1958)
- The Best of Sellers, Peter Sellers (1958)
- "I'm in Charge", Bruce Forsyth (1959)
- "Saturday Jump", Humphrey Lyttelton (1959)
- Songs for Swingin' Sellers, Peter Sellers (1959)
- "Goodness Gracious Me", Peter Sellers & Sophia Loren (1960)
- "Portrait of My Love", Matt Monro (1960)
- Beyond the Fringe (original cast recording) (1961)
- "My Boomerang Won't Come Back", Charlie Drake (1961)
- "My Kind of Girl", Matt Monro (1961)
- "Strictly for the Birds", Dudley Moore (1961)
- "You're Driving Me Crazy", The Temperance Seven (1961)
- "Right Said Fred", Bernard Cribbins (1962)
- "Football Results", Michael Bentine (1962)
- "Gossip Calypso", Bernard Cribbins (1962)
- "Hole in the Ground", Bernard Cribbins (1962)
- "Morse Code Melody", The Alberts (1962)
- "My Brother", Terry Scott (1962)
- "Sun Arise", Rolf Harris (1962)
- "Bad to Me", Billy J. Kramer with the Dakotas (1963)
- Cambridge Circus (original cast recording) (1963)
- "Hello Little Girl", The Fourmost (1963)
- "How Do You Do It?", Gerry and the Pacemakers (1963)
- "I (Who Have Nothing)", Shirley Bassey (1963)
- "If This Should Be a Dream", Christine Campbell (1963)
- "Oh Not Again Ken", Joan Sims (1963)
- At the Drop of Another Hat, Flanders and Swann (1964)
- "Don't Let the Sun Catch You Crying", Gerry and the Pacemakers (1964)
- "Goldfinger", Shirley Bassey (1964)
- "I Like It", Gerry & the Pacemakers (1964)
- "It's You", Alma Cogan (1964)
- "Little Children", Billy J. Kramer with the Dakotas (1964)
- "Nothing Better To Do", Bill Oddie (1964)
- "Walk Away", Matt Monro (1964)
- "You're My World", Cilla Black (1964)
- "Ferry Cross the Mersey", Gerry & the Pacemakers (1965)
- "I'll Be There", Gerry & the Pacemakers (1965)
- 2 Day's Monday, The Scaffold (1966)
- Adventure, Ron Goodwin (1966)
- Alfie, Cilla Black (1966)
- Ludo, Ivor Cutler (1967)
- "London By George", (1968)
- Step Inside Love, Cilla Black (1968)
- Edwards Hand, Edwards Hand (1969)
- Marrakesh Express, Stan Getz (1970)
- Seatrain, Seatrain (1970)
- Sentimental Journey, Ringo Starr (1970)
- The Marblehead Messenger, Seatrain (1971)
- Icarus, Paul Winter Consort (1972)
- The King's Singers Collection, The King's Singers (1972)
- A French Collection, The King's Singers (1973)
- "Deck the Hall", The King's Singers (1973)
- "Live and Let Die", Paul McCartney and Wings (1973)
- The Height Below, John Williams (1973)
- Apocalypse, Mahavishnu Orchestra (1974)
- Holiday, America (1974)
- "Lonely People", America (1974)
- My Life, My Song, Tommy Steele (1974)
- The Man in the Bowler Hat, Stackridge (1974) (Note: Released as Pinafore Days in the US and Canada.)
- "Tin Man", America (1974)
- Blow by Blow, Jeff Beck (1975)
- Hearts, America (1975)
- Sister Golden Hair, America (1975)
- American Flyer, American Flyer (1976)
- Born On a Friday, Cleo Laine (1976)
- Hideaway, America (1976)
- Wired, Jeff Beck (1976)
- A Song, Neil Sedaka (1977)
- El Mirage, Jimmy Webb (1977)
- Harbor, America (1977)
- "Oh! Darling", Robin Gibb (1978)
- Sgt. Pepper's Lonely Hearts Club Band (1978, original soundtrack)
- No More Fear of Flying, Gary Brooker (1979)
- Silent Letter, America (1979)
- All Shook Up, Cheap Trick (1980)
- No Place to Run, UFO (1980)
- "The Night Owls", Little River Band (1981)
- Time Exposure, Little River Band (1981)
- "Ebony and Ivory", Paul McCartney & Stevie Wonder (1982)
- Quartet, Ultravox (1982)
- Tug of War, Paul McCartney (1982)
- Pipes of Peace, Paul McCartney (1983)
- "Say Say Say", Paul McCartney & Michael Jackson (1983)
- Give My Regards to Broad Street, Paul McCartney (1984)
- "No More Lonely Nights", Paul McCartney (1984)
- "Morning Desire", Kenny Rogers (1985)
- The Heart of the Matter, Kenny Rogers (1985)
- Quiet Storm, Peabo Bryson (1986)
- Positive, Peabo Bryson (1988)
- Say Something, Andy Leek (1988)
- Eternal Melody, Yoshiki (1993)
- The Who's Tommy (original cast recording) (1993)
- The Glory of Gershwin, Larry Adler (1994)
- "The Man I Love", Kate Bush & Larry Adler (1994)
- "Candle in the Wind 1997", Elton John (1997)
- "The Reason", Celine Dion (1997)

=== Solo works ===
- Off the Beatle Track (1964)
- By Popular Demand, A Hard Day's Night: Instrumental Versions of the Motion Picture Score (1964)
- George Martin Scores Instrumental Versions of the Hits (1965)
- Help! (1965)
- ..and I Love Her (1966)
- George Martin Instrumentally Salutes The Beatle Girls (1966)
- The Family Way (1967)
- British Maid (1968) (Note: Released in the US as London by George)
- Yellow Submarine (1969) (Note: Specifically, side two of the album, credited to the George Martin Orchestra)
- By George! (1970)
- Beatles to Bond and Bach (1974)
- In My Life (1998)
- Produced by George Martin (2001)
- The Family Way (2003)

== Parlophone releases ==
=== Complete Parlophone (UK / IE) vinyl singles catalogue ===
The Beatles / band members solo releases

Listed below are all Parlophone vinyl singles released in the UK and IE by the Beatles and band members as solo artists. Original releases only.

Parlophone (UK / IE) vinyl singles catalogue
Year	Cat. no.	A-side	B-side	Peak chart positions		Album	Artist
Year	Cat. no.	A-side	B-side	UK	IE	Album	Artist
1962	R 4949	"Love Me Do"	"P.S. I Love You"	17	—	Please Please Me	The Beatles
1963	R 4983	"Please Please Me"	"Ask Me Why"	2	10	Please Please Me	The Beatles
1963	R 5015	"From Me to You"	"Thank You Girl"	1	1	Non-album single	The Beatles
1963	R 5055	"She Loves You"	"I'll Get You"	1	2	Non-album single	The Beatles
1963	—	—	—	—	—	With the Beatles	The Beatles
1963	R 5084	"I Want to Hold Your Hand"	"This Boy"	1	2	Non-album single	The Beatles
1964	R 5114	"Can't Buy Me Love"	"You Can't Do That"	1	1	A Hard Day's Night	The Beatles
1964	R 5160	"A Hard Day's Night"	"Things We Said Today"	1	1	A Hard Day's Night	The Beatles
1964	R 5200	"I Feel Fine"	"She's a Woman"	1	1	Non-album single	The Beatles
1964	—	—	—	—	—	Beatles for Sale	The Beatles
1965	R 5265	"Ticket to Ride"	"Yes It Is"	1	1	Help!	The Beatles
1965	R 5305	"Help!"	"I'm Down"	1	1	Help!	The Beatles
1965	R 5389	"We Can Work It Out"	"Day Tripper"	1	1	Non-album single	The Beatles
1965	—	—	—	—	—	Rubber Soul	The Beatles
1966	R 5452	"Paperback Writer"	"Rain"	1	1	Non-album single	The Beatles
1966	R 5493	"Yellow Submarine"	"Eleanor Rigby"	1	1	Revolver	The Beatles
1966	—	—	—	—	—	A Collection of Beatles Oldies	The Beatles
1967	R 5570	"Strawberry Fields Forever"	"Penny Lane"	2	2	Non-album single	The Beatles
1967	—	—	—	—	—	Sgt. Pepper's Lonely Hearts Club Band	The Beatles
1967	R 5620	"All You Need Is Love"	"Baby, You're a Rich Man"	1	1	Non-album single	The Beatles
1967	R 5655	"Hello, Goodbye"	"I Am the Walrus"	1	2	Non-album single	The Beatles
1968	R 5675	"Lady Madonna"	"The Inner Light"	1	3	Non-album single	The Beatles
1968	R 5722	"Hey Jude"	"Revolution"	1	1	Non-album single	The Beatles
1968	—	—	—	—	—	The Beatles	The Beatles
1969	—	—	—	—	—	Yellow Submarine	The Beatles
1969	R 5777	"Get Back"	"Don't Let Me Down"	1	1	Let It Be	The Beatles
1969	R 5786	"The Ballad of John and Yoko"	"Old Brown Shoe"	1	1	Non-album single	The Beatles
1969	R 5814	"Something"	"Come Together"	4	3	Abbey Road	The Beatles
1970	R 5833	"Let It Be"	"You Know My Name (Look Up the Number)"	2	3	Let It Be	The Beatles
1970	—	—	—	—	—	McCartney	Paul McCartney
1971	R 5884	"My Sweet Lord"	"What Is Life"	1	1	All Things Must Pass	George Harrison
1971	R 5889	"Another Day"	"Oh Woman, Oh Why"	2	1	Non-album single	Paul McCartney
1971	R 5892	"Power to the People"	"Open Your Box"	7	7	Non-album single	John Lennon
1971	R 5898	"It Don't Come Easy"	"Early 1970"	4	4	Non-album single	Ringo Starr
1971	R 5912	"Bangla Desh"	"Deep Blue"	10	18	Non-album single	George Harrison
1971	R 5914	"Back Seat of My Car"	"Heart of the Country"	39	—	Ram	Paul McCartney
1972	R 5932	"Love Is Strange" – (unreleased)	"I Am Your Singer" – (unreleased)	—	—	Wild Life	Paul McCartney
1972	R 5936	"Give Ireland Back to the Irish"	(Instrumental Version)	16	1	Non-album single	Paul McCartney
1972	R 5944	"Back Off Boogaloo"	"Blindman"	2	12	Non-album single	Ringo Starr
1972	R 5949	"Mary Had a Little Lamb"	"Little Woman Love"	9	—	Non-album single	Paul McCartney
1972	R 5953	"Woman Is the Nigger of the World" – (unreleased)	"Sisters O Sisters" – (unreleased)	—	—	Some Time in New York City	John Lennon
1972	R 5970	"Happy Xmas (War Is Over)"	"Listen, the Snow Is Falling"	2	2	Non-album single	John Lennon
1972	R 5973	"Hi, Hi, Hi"	"C Moon"	5	18	Non-album single	Paul McCartney
1973	R 5985	"My Love"	"The Mess"	9	—	Red Rose Speedway	Paul McCartney
1973	—	—	—	—	—	1962–1966	The Beatles
1973	—	—	—	—	—	1967–1970	The Beatles
1973	R 5987	"Live and Let Die"	"I Lie Around"	9	—	Non-album single	Paul McCartney
1973	R 5988	"Give Me Love (Give Me Peace on Earth)"	"Miss O'Dell"	8	10	Living in the Material World	George Harrison
1973	R 5992	"Photograph"	"Down and Out"	8	15	Ringo	Ringo Starr
1973	R 5993	"Helen Wheels"	"Country Dreamer"	12	—	Non-album single	Paul McCartney
1973	R 5994	"Mind Games"	"Meat City"	26	—	Mind Games	John Lennon
1974	R 5995	"You're Sixteen"	"Devil Woman"	4	2	Ringo	Ringo Starr
1974	R 5996	"Jet"	"Let Me Roll It"	7	—	Band on the Run	Paul McCartney
1974	R 5997	"Band on the Run"	"Zoo Gang"	3	7	Band on the Run	Paul McCartney
1974	R 5998	"Whatever Gets You Thru' the Night"	"Beef Jerky"	36	—	Walls and Bridges	John Lennon
1974	R 5999	"Junior's Farm"	"Sally G"	16	—	Non-album single	Paul McCartney
1974	R 6000	"Only You"	"Call Me"	28	—	Goodnight Vienna	Ringo Starr
1975	R 6001	"Dark Horse"	"Hari's on Tour (Express)"	—	—	Dark Horse	George Harrison
1975	R 6002	"Ding Dong"	"I Don't Care Anymore"	38	—	Dark Horse	George Harrison
1975	R 6003	"#9 Dream"	"What You Got"	23	—	Walls and Bridges	John Lennon
1975	R 6004	"Snookeroo"	"Oo-Wee"	—	—	Goodnight Vienna	Ringo Starr
1975	R 6005	"Stand By Me"	"Move Over Ms. L"	30	—	Rock 'n' Roll	John Lennon
1975	R 6006	"Listen to What the Man Said"	"Love in Song"	6	4	Venus and Mars	Paul McCartney
1975	R 6007	"You"	"World of Stone"	38	—	Extra Texture (Read All About It)	George Harrison
1975	R 6008	"Letting Go"	"You Gave Me the Answer"	41	—	Venus and Mars	Paul McCartney
1975	R 6009	"Imagine"	"Working Class Hero"	1	1	Shaved Fish	John Lennon
1975	R 6010	"Venus and Mars"/"Rock Show"	"Magneto and Titanium Man"	—	—	Venus and Mars	Paul McCartney
1976	R 6011	"Oh My My"	"No No Song"	—	—	Blast from Your Past	Ringo Starr
1976	R 6012	"This Guitar (Can't Keep from Crying)"	"Māya Love"	—	—	Extra Texture (Read All About It)	George Harrison
1976	R 6013	"Yesterday"	"I Should Have Known Better"	8	4	The Singles Collection 1962–1970	The Beatles
1976	R 6014	"Silly Love Songs"	"Cook of the House"	2	1	Wings at the Speed of Sound	Paul McCartney
1976	R 6015	"Let 'Em In"	"Beware My Love"	2	2	Wings at the Speed of Sound	Paul McCartney
1976	R 6016	"Back in the U.S.S.R."	"Twist and Shout"	19	11	Rock 'n' Roll Music	The Beatles
1976	—	—	—	—	—	The Best of George Harrison	George Harrison
1977	R 6017	"Maybe I'm Amazed" (live)	"Soily" (live)	28	—	Wings over America	Paul McCartney
1977	—	—	—	—	—	The Beatles at the Hollywood Bowl	The Beatles
1977	—	—	—	—	—	Love Songs	The Beatles
1977	R 6018	"Mull of Kintyre"	"Girls' School"	1	1	Non-album single	Paul McCartney
1978	R 6019	"With a Little Luck"	"Backwards Traveller"/"Cuff Link"	5	3	London Town	Paul McCartney
1978	R 6020	"I've Had Enough"	"Deliver Your Children"	42	11	London Town	Paul McCartney
1978	R 6021	"London Town"	"I'm Carrying"	60	—	London Town	Paul McCartney
1978	R 6022	"Sgt. Pepper's Lonely Hearts Club Band" / "With a Little Help from My Friends"	"A Day in the Life"	63	—	Sgt. Pepper's Lonely Hearts Club Band	The Beatles
1978	—	—	—	—	—	Wings Greatest	Paul McCartney
1978	—	—	—	—	—	Rarities	The Beatles
1979	R 6023	"Goodnight Tonight"	"Daytime Nighttime Suffering"	5	9	Non-album single	Paul McCartney
1979	R 6026	"Old Siam, Sir"	"Spin It On"	35	29	Back to the Egg	Paul McCartney
1979	R 6027	"Getting Closer"	"Baby's Request"	60	24	Back to the Egg	Paul McCartney
1979	R 6029	"Wonderful Christmastime"	"Rudolph the Red-Nosed Reggae" (Instrumental)	6	8	Non-album single	Paul McCartney
1980	R 6035	"Coming Up"	"Coming Up" (Live at Glasgow) / "Lunch Box/Odd Sox"	2	3	McCartney II	Paul McCartney
1980	R 6037	"Waterfalls"	"Check My Machine"	9	4	McCartney II	Paul McCartney
1980	R 6039	"Temporary Secretary"	"Secret Friend" – (12-inch-only B-side release)	—	—	McCartney II	Paul McCartney
1980	—	—	—	—	—	The Beatles Ballads	The Beatles
1982	R 6054	"Ebony and Ivory"	"Rainclouds"	1	1	Tug of War	Paul McCartney
1982	R 6055	"The Beatles' Movie Medley"	"I'm Happy Just to Dance with You"	10	12	Reel Music	The Beatles
1982	R 6056	"Take It Away"	"I'll Give You a Ring"	15	26	Tug of War	Paul McCartney
1982	R 6057	"Tug of War"	"Get It"	53	—	Tug of War	Paul McCartney
1982	—	—	—	—	—	20 Greatest Hits	The Beatles
1982	R 6059	"Love"	"Give Me Some Truth"	41	21	The John Lennon Collection	John Lennon
1983	R 6062	"Say Say Say"	"Ode to a Koala Bear"	2	3	Pipes of Peace	Paul McCartney
1983	R 6064	"Pipes of Peace"	"So Bad"	1	1	Pipes of Peace	Paul McCartney
1984	R 6066	"The Man" – (unreleased)	"Blackpool" – (unreleased)	—	—	Pipes of Peace	Paul McCartney
1984	R 6080	"No More Lonely Nights" (Ballad)	"No More Lonely Nights" (Playout Version)	2	2	Give My Regards to Broad Street	Paul McCartney
1984	R 6086	"We All Stand Together"	"We All Stand Together" (Humming Version)	3	3	Non-album single	Paul McCartney
1985	R 6089	"Ballroom Dancing" – (unreleased)	"Wanderlust" – (unreleased)	—	—	Give My Regards to Broad Street	Paul McCartney
1985	R 6117	"Jealous Guy"	"Going Down on Love"	65	28	Non-album single	John Lennon
1985	R 6118	"Spies Like Us"	"My Carnival"	13	8	Non-album single	Paul McCartney
1986	R 6133	"Press"	"It's Not True"	25	15	Press to Play	Paul McCartney
1986	R 6145	"Pretty Little Head"	"Write Away"	76	—	Press to Play	Paul McCartney
1986	R 6148	"Only Love Remains"	"Tough on a Tightrope"	34	20	Press to Play	Paul McCartney
1987	R 6170	"Once Upon a Long Ago"	"Back on My Feet"	10	4	All the Best!	Paul McCartney
1988	—	—	—	—	—	Past Masters	The Beatles
1988	R 6199	"Imagine" – (re-issue)	"Jealous Guy" / "Happy Xmas (War Is Over)" – (re-issue)	45	29	Imagine: John Lennon	John Lennon
1989	R 6213	"My Brave Face"	"Flying to My Home"	18	6	Flowers in the Dirt	Paul McCartney
1989	R 6223	"This One"	"The First Stone"	18	27	Flowers in the Dirt	Paul McCartney
1989	R 6235	"Figure of Eight"	"Où est le Soleil?"	42	25	Flowers in the Dirt	Paul McCartney
1989	R 6238	"Party Party"	"Party Party" (Extended Club Mix) – (12-inch-only B-side release)	—	—	Flowers in the Dirt	Paul McCartney
1990	R 6246	"Put It There"	"Mama's Little Girl"	32	17	Flowers in the Dirt	Paul McCartney
1990	R 6271	"Birthday" (live)	"Good Day Sunshine" (live)	29	22	Tripping the Live Fantastic	Paul McCartney
1990	R 6278	"All My Trials" (live)	"C Moon" (live)	35	—	Tripping the Live Fantastic: Highlights!	Paul McCartney
1991	—	—	—	—	—	Unplugged (The Official Bootleg)	Paul McCartney
1991	—	—	—	—	—	CHOBA B CCCP	Paul McCartney
1993	R 6330	"Hope of Deliverance"	"Long Leather Coat"	18	28	Off the Ground	Paul McCartney
1993	R 6338	"C'Mon People"	"I Can't Imagine"	41	—	Off the Ground	Paul McCartney
1993	—	—	—	—	—	Paul Is Live	Paul McCartney
1995	R 6406	"Baby It's You" / "I'll Follow the Sun"	"Devil in Her Heart" / "Boys"	7	12	Live at the BBC	The Beatles
1995	R 6422	"Free as a Bird"	"Christmas Time (Is Here Again)"	2	5	Anthology 1	The Beatles
1996	R 6425	"Real Love"	"Baby's in Black"	4	8	Anthology 2	The Beatles
1996	—	—	—	—	—	Anthology 3	The Beatles
1997	R 6462	"Young Boy"	"Looking for You"	19	—	Flaming Pie	Paul McCartney
1997	R 6472	"The World Tonight"	"Used to Be Bad"	23	—	Flaming Pie	Paul McCartney
1997	R 6489	"Beautiful Night"	"Love Come Tumbling Down"	25	—	Flaming Pie	Paul McCartney
1999	—	—	—	—	—	Yellow Submarine Songtrack	The Beatles
1999	R 6527	"No Other Baby"	"Brown Eyed Handsome Man" / "Fabulous"	42	—	Run Devil Run	Paul McCartney
2000	—	—	—	—	—	1	The Beatles
2000	R 6534	"Imagine" – (re-issue)	"Happy Xmas (War Is Over)" – (re-issue)	33	—	Lennon Legend	John Lennon
2001	—	—	—	—	—	Wingspan: Hits and History	Paul McCartney
2001	R 6567	"From a Lover to a Friend"	"Riding Into Jaipur"	45	—	Driving Rain	Paul McCartney
2003	—	—	—	—	—	Back in the World	Paul McCartney
2003	R 6601	"Any Road"	"Marwa Blues"	37	—	Brainwashed	George Harrison
2003	—	—	—	—	—	Let It Be... Naked	The Beatles
2003	R 6627	"Happy Xmas (War Is Over)" – (re-issue)	"Imagine" – (re-issue)	17	—	Lennon Legend	John Lennon
2004	R 6649	"Tropic Island Hum"	"We All Stand Together"	21	30	Non-album single	Paul McCartney
2005	R 6673	"Fine Line"	"Growing Up Falling Down"	20	—	Chaos and Creation in the Backyard	Paul McCartney
2005	R 6678	"Jenny Wren"	"Summer of '59"	22	—	Chaos and Creation in the Backyard	Paul McCartney
2007	—	—	—	—	—	Love	The Beatles
2010	R 6813	"Paperback Writer" – (re-issue)	"Rain" – (re-issue)	—	—	Non-album single	The Beatles
2013	—	—	—	—	—	On Air – Live at the BBC Volume 2	The Beatles
2025	—	—	—	—	—	Anthology 4	The Beatles
Under Peak chart positions, "—" denotes a recording that did not chart or was not released in that territory.
All Parlophone UK and IE catalogue numbers are identical.

Shading denotes B-side; non-inclusion of chart activity; and non-core released album.

== See also ==
- Outline of the Beatles
- Recording practices of the Beatles
- The Beatles timeline

== Bibliography ==
- The Beatles (2000). The Beatles Anthology. Chronicle Books. ISBN 978-0-8118-2684-6.
- The Beatles (2003). The Beatles Anthology (DVD). Apple Records. ASIN: B00008GKEG.
- Brend, Mark (2005). Strange Sounds: Offbeat Instruments and Sonic Experiments in Pop. San Francisco, California: Backbeat Books. ISBN 978-0-879308551.
- Bronson, Fred (2003). Billboard's Hottest Hot 100 Hits (3 ed.). Billboard Books. ISBN 9780823077380.
- Emerick, Geoff; Massey, Howard (2006). Here, There and Everywhere: My Life Recording the Music of The Beatles. New York City, New York: Penguin Books. ISBN 1-59240-179-1.
- Friede, Goldie; Titone, Robin; Weiner, Sue (1980). The Beatles A to Z. Methuen. ISBN 978-0-416-00781-7.
- Gould, Jonathan (2007). Can't Buy Me Love The Beatles, Britain and America. Random House Digital. ISBN 978-0-307-35338-2.
- Hepworth, David (2019). A Fabulous Creation: How the LP Saved Our Lives. Bantam. ISBN 978-1-7841-6208-5.
- Hertsgaard, Mark (1996). A Day in the Life: The Music and Artistry of the Beatles. London, England: Pan Books. ISBN 0-330-33891-9.
- Howard, David N. (2004). Sonic Alchemy: Visionary Music Producers and Their Maverick Recordings. Milwaukee, Wisconsin: Hal Leonard. ISBN 978-0-634-05560-7.
- Lewis, Michael; Spignesi, Stephen J. (2009). 100 Best Beatles Songs: A Passionate Fan's Guide. Hachette Books. ISBN 9781603762656.
- Lewisohn, Mark (1988). The Beatles Recording Sessions. New York City, New York: Harmony Books. ISBN 0-517-57066-1.
- Lewisohn, Mark (1990). The Beatles: Recording Sessions. Three Rivers Press; Reprint edition. ISBN 978-0-517-58182-7.
- Lewisohn, Mark (2010). The Complete Beatles Chronicle: The Definitive Day-by-day Guide to the Beatles' Entire Career. Chicago Review Press. ISBN 978-1-56976-534-0.
- Lewisohn, Mark (2013). The Beatles: All These Years: Volume I: Tune In. Crown Archetype. ISBN 978-1-4000-8305-3.
- MacDonald, Ian (1994). Revolution in the Head: The Beatles' Records and the Sixties. New York: Henry Holt and Company. ISBN 978-0-8050-2780-8.
- Martin, George (1983). Making Music. New York: William Morrow and Company. ISBN 978-0-688-01465-0.
- Martin, George (1995). All You Need Is Ears. New York: St. Martin's Press. ISBN 978-0-312-11482-4.
- Martin, George; Pearson, William (1995). Summer of Love: The Making of Sgt. Pepper. London: Pan Books. ISBN 978-0-330-34210-0.
- Martin, George (2002). Playback: An Illustrated Memoir. Guildford: Genesis Publications. ISBN 978-0-904-35182-8.
- Miles, Barry (1997). Paul McCartney: Many Years from Now. New York: Henry Holt and Company. ISBN 978-0-8050-5249-7.
- Miles, Barry (2001). The Beatles Diary Volume 1: The Beatles Years. Omnibus Press. ISBN 978-0-85712-000-7.
- Rodriguez, Robert; The Beatles (2012). Revolver: How the Beatles Re-Imagined Rock 'n' Roll. Backbeat Books. ISBN 978-1-4768-1355-4.
- Sikov, Ed (2002). Mr. Strangelove: A Biography of Peter Sellers. Hachette Books. ISBN 978-0-7868-6664-9.
- Spitz, Bob (2005). The Beatles – The Biography. New York City, New York: Little, Brown and Company. ISBN 978-0-316-80352-6.
- Sounes, Howard (2010). Fab: An Intimate Life of Paul McCartney. London, England: HarperCollins. ISBN 978-0-00-723705-0.
- Stark, Steven D. (2005). Meet the Beatles: A Cultural History of the Band That Shook Youth, Gender, and the World. HarperCollins. ISBN 978-0-06-184252-8.
- Ventham, Maxine (2002). Spike Milligan: His Part In Our Lives. London: Robson. ISBN 978-1-86105-530-9.
- Womack, Kenneth (2014). The Beatles Encyclopedia: Everything Fab Four. Santa Barbara, CA: ABC-CLIO. ISBN 978-0-313-39171-2.
- Womack, Kenneth (2017). Maximum Volume: The Life of Beatles Producer George Martin (The Early Years, 1926–1966). Chicago: Chicago Review Press. ISBN 978-1-61373-189-5.
- Womack, Kenneth (2018). Sound Pictures: The Life of Beatles Producer George Martin (The Later Years, 1966–2016). Chicago: Chicago Review Press. ISBN 978-0-91277-774-0.
