= Tropic Island Hum =

"Tropic Island Hum" / "We All Stand Together"

Single by Paul McCartney
- B-side: "We All Stand Together"
- Released: 20 September 2004
- Recorded: December 1987: September 1994 (overdubs)
- Studio: Hogg Hill Mill (Icklesham, UK); AIR (London)
- Genre: Children's music
- Length: 5:49 (video version); 3:11 (radio edit)
- Label: Parlophone; M.P.L.
- Songwriter: Paul McCartney
- Producer: Paul McCartney

Paul McCartney singles chronology
"Vanilla Sky" (2001)	"Tropic Island Hum" / "We All Stand Together" (2004)	"Sgt. Pepper's Lonely Hearts Club Band (with U2)" (2005)

"Tropic Island Hum", released in 2004, but originally recorded in 1987, is a song from Paul McCartney's second animated film for children. The associated single reached #21 in the UK and #30 in Ireland.

== Release ==
The "Tropic Island Hum" film is from a story and screenplay by Paul McCartney, who with his wife, Linda McCartney, provide all the character's voices. They were also the executive producers.

The film was first released theatrically on October 10, 1997. It was subsequently released in 2004 on DVD by Miramax Films as one of the segments of Paul McCartney: Music & Animation. The DVD also includes the 1984 short film Rupert and the Frog Song, and Tuesday.

== Summary ==
The film tells the story of Wirral the Squirrel, who was almost killed by soldiers. Froggo helped him and took him to another place he would go. He couldn't go back there again! But then, he finds a tropical island. Bison is the chief of that island, and Wirral's new love crush is Wilhelmina. Then, all 3 of them (except Wilhelmina) get cleaned up and that night, they perform the theme song to the island. Bison sings the first part of the song. A parrot gets banged on the bass drum and is dizzy. Later, an alligator sings. Right after that, Wirral blushes at his new love crush Wilhelmina. Then a bad thing appears, the mask-animals try to ruin the party, but then, a school appears, and at the end Wirral & Wilhelmina share a kiss.

== Track listing ==
All songs written by Paul McCartney.

1. "Tropic Island Hum" (radio edit) – 3:11
2. "We All Stand Together" (single version) – 3:06

== Charts ==
=== Weekly charts ===
Chart (2004)	Peak position
Ireland (IRMA)	30
UK Singles (Official Charts)	21

Note: Both sides charted together.

== Personnel ==
According to The Paul McCartney Project:

- Paul McCartney – lead vocals
- Marion Montgomery – lead vocals
- The London Community Gospel Choir – backing vocals
- Unknown musician(s) – acoustic guitar, electric guitar, mandolin, double-bass, horns, drums, percussion
