= Sgt. Pepper's Lonely Hearts Club Band (song) =

1967 song by the Beatles

- Cover of the song's sheet music

Song by the Beatles

from the album Sgt. Pepper's Lonely Hearts Club Band
- Released: 26 May 1967
- Recorded: 1 February – 6 March 1967
- Studio: EMI, London
- Genre: Psychedelic rock; hard rock
- Length: 1:59
- Label: Parlophone; Capitol
- Songwriter: Lennon–McCartney
- Producer: George Martin

Audio sample
- "Sgt. Pepper's Lonely Hearts Club Band": file; help

"Sgt. Pepper's Lonely Hearts Club Band" is a song by the English rock band the Beatles, written by Paul McCartney, credited to Lennon–McCartney, and released in 1967 on the album of the same name. The song appears twice on the album: as the opening track (segueing into "With a Little Help from My Friends"), and as "Sgt. Pepper's Lonely Hearts Club Band (Reprise)", the penultimate track (segueing into "A Day in the Life"). As the title song, the lyrics introduce the fictional band that performs on the album.

Since its original album release, "Sgt. Pepper's Lonely Hearts Club Band" has also been released on various Beatles singles and compilation albums. The song has also been performed by several other artists, including Jimi Hendrix and U2.

== Authorship and recording ==
In November 1966, on the flight back to England after a holiday in Kenya, McCartney conceived an idea in which an entire album would be role-played, with each of the Beatles assuming an alter-ego in the "Lonely Hearts Club Band", which would then perform a concert in front of an audience. The inspiration is said to have come when roadie Mal Evans asked McCartney what the letters "S" and "P" stood for on the pots on their in-flight meal trays, and McCartney explained it was for salt and pepper. This then led to the Sgt. Pepper's Lonely Hearts Club Band concept, as well as the song.

The group's road manager, Neil Aspinall, suggested the idea of Sgt. Pepper being the compère, as well as the reprise at the end of the album. According to his diaries, Evans may have also contributed to the song. John Lennon attributed the idea for Sgt. Pepper to McCartney, although the song is officially credited to Lennon–McCartney. The Beatles recorded the track in Abbey Road's studio 2, with George Martin producing, and Geoff Emerick engineering. Work on the song started on 1 February 1967, and after three further sessions the recording was completed on 6 March 1967.

== Song structure ==
On the Sgt. Pepper's Lonely Hearts Club Band album, the song opens to the sound of a chattering audience, and an orchestra tuning up, which was taken from the 10 February orchestra session for "A Day in the Life". The crowd sounds edited into the song were recorded in the early 1960s by Martin, during a live recording of the stage show Beyond the Fringe. The band is then introduced by name. The song's structure is:

1. Introduction (instrumental)
2. Verse
3. Bridge (instrumental)
4. Refrain
5. Bridge
6. Verse
7. Instrumental bridge and transition into "With a Little Help from My Friends".

The song is in G major, with a 4/4 meter. A horn quartet was used to fill out the instrumental sections.

=== Reprise ===
"Sgt. Pepper's Lonely Hearts Club Band (Reprise)"

Song by the Beatles

from the album Sgt. Pepper's Lonely Hearts Club Band
- Released: 26 May 1967
- Recorded: 1 April 1967
- Studio: EMI, London
- Genre: Hard rock
- Length: 1:18
- Label: Parlophone; Capitol
- Songwriter: Lennon–McCartney
- Producer: George Martin

"Sgt. Pepper's Lonely Hearts Club Band (Reprise)" is a modified repeat of the opening song at a faster tempo and with heavier instrumentation. The track opens with McCartney's count-in; between 2 and 3, Lennon jokingly interjects "Bye!" Ringo Starr starts the song proper by playing the drum part unaccompanied for four bars, at the end of which a brief bass glissando from McCartney cues the full ensemble of two distorted electric guitars (played by George Harrison and Lennon), bass, drums and overdubbed percussion. In addition, McCartney overdubbed a Hammond organ part onto the track.

While the first version of the song had stayed largely in the key of G major (except for transient modulation to F and perhaps C in the bridges), the reprise starts in F and features a modulation, to G. The mono and stereo mixes of the song differ slightly: the former has a fractionally different transition from the previous song, and includes crowd noise and laughter in the opening bars that are absent from the stereo mix.

The idea for a reprise was Aspinall's, who thought that, as there was a "welcome song", there should also be a "goodbye song". The song contains broadly the same melody as the opening version, but with different lyrics and omitting the "It's wonderful to be here" section. At 1:18, it is one of the Beatles' shorter songs (the shortest is "Her Majesty" at 0:23). The reprise was recorded on 1 April 1967, two months after the version that opens the album. At the end of the track, Martin's applause sample segues into the final track of the album, "A Day in the Life". A run-through of the reprise is included on the outtakes album Anthology 2 (1996).

In 2006, the reprise was re-released on the album Love, which was a theatrical production by Cirque du Soleil. The updated version is a remix featuring samples of other Beatles' songs and fades out before the cross-fade into "A Day in the Life".

== Releases ==
It was originally released in the UK on 26 May 1967, and in the US on 2 June 1967 on the Sgt. Pepper's Lonely Hearts Club Band LP.

When the Beatles' recording contract with EMI expired in 1976, EMI were free to re-release music from the Beatles' catalogue, and in 1978 issued "Sgt. Pepper's Lonely Hearts Club Band"/"With a Little Help from My Friends" as the A-side of a single, with "A Day in the Life" as the B-side. The single was released on Capitol in the US on 14 August (closely following the release there of the Sgt. Pepper's Lonely Hearts Club Band film), reaching number 71 on 30 September 1978 where it stayed for two weeks. The single was issued on Parlophone in the UK in September.

Country	Chart	Rank
UK	Music Week	63
US	Billboard Hot 100	71
US	Cash Box	92
US	Record World	103

The original recording of the song is included on the Beatles compilation albums 1967–1970 (1973) and Yellow Submarine Songtrack (1999).

The notebook used by McCartney containing the lyrics for "Sgt. Pepper's Lonely Hearts Club Band" and other songs was put up for sale in 1998.

== Live performances ==
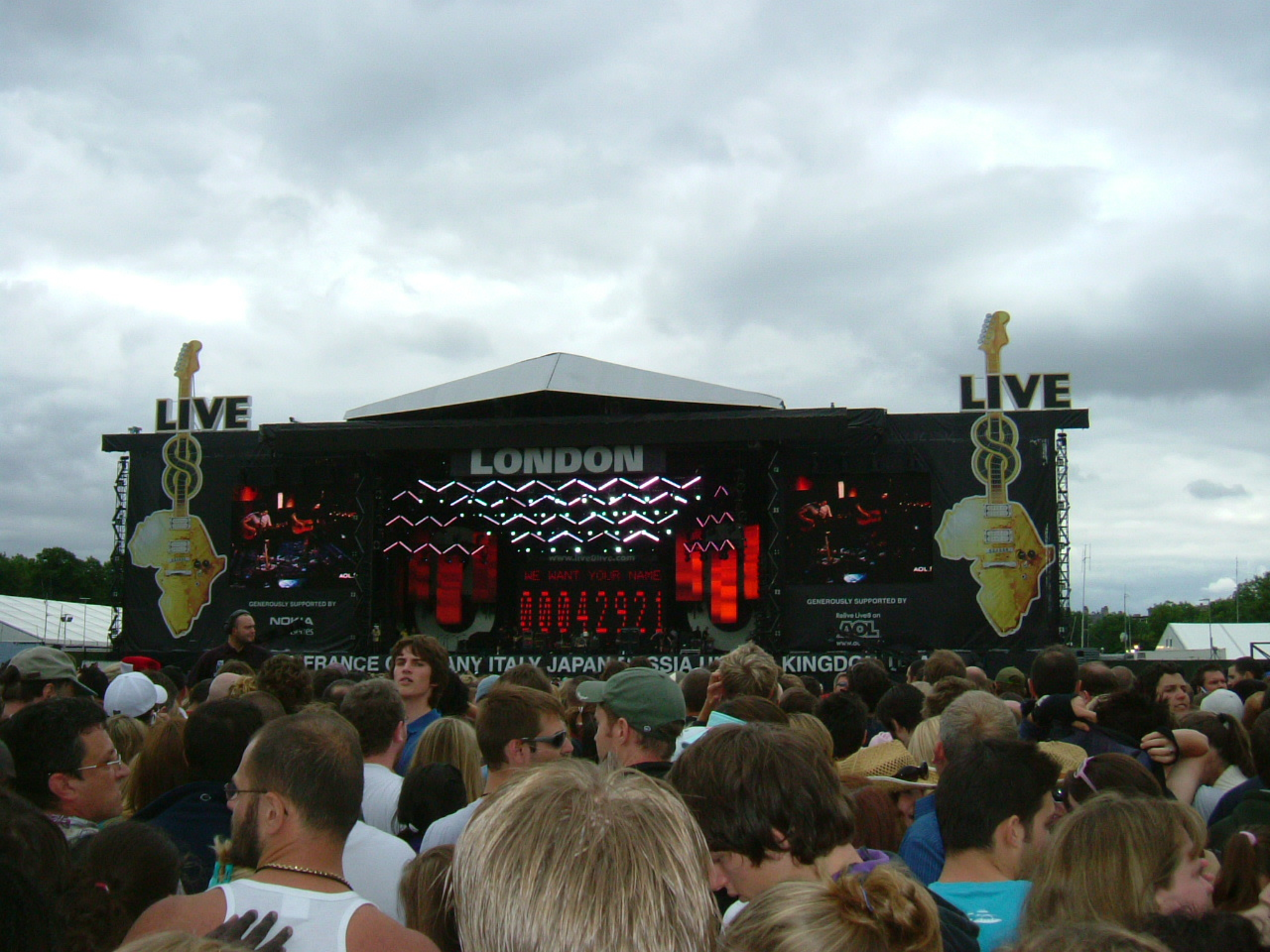
McCartney has often performed the song in concert, including at Live 8 in London in 2005.

"Sgt. Pepper's Lonely Hearts Club Band" was never performed live by the Beatles. It was performed by three of the former band members (McCartney, Harrison and Starr) plus Eric Clapton on 19 May 1979, at Clapton's wedding party.

Paul McCartney played the song live on the 1989–90 Paul McCartney World Tour. On subsequent tours he would play the reprise version and use that as a segue into "The End". When the performance is released, it usually is listed as "Sgt. Pepper's/The End", shortening the name of the song. When McCartney performs it, he usually adds the count-in after the drum part begins, as opposed to McCartney's count-in preceding the drum opening.

"Sgt. Pepper's Lonely Hearts Club Band"

Single by Paul McCartney and U2
- Released: 2005
- Recorded: 2005
- Label: iTunes
- Songwriter: Lennon–McCartney

Paul McCartney singles chronology
"Tropic Island Hum" / "We All Stand Together" (2004)	"Sgt. Pepper's Lonely Hearts Club Band" (2005)	"Fine Line" (2005)

U2 singles chronology
"City of Blinding Lights" (2005)	"Sgt. Pepper's Lonely Hearts Club Band" (2005)	"One" (2005)

McCartney and U2 played the song at the start of the Live 8 concert in London's Hyde Park on 2 July 2005. The song, starting with "It was twenty years ago, today", was chosen among others to commemorate that Live 8 took place approximately twenty years after Live Aid. The single was released for charity on iTunes, hitting number 48 on the Billboard Hot 100 and number 1 on the UK Downloads chart, setting a world record for the fastest-selling online song of all time.

On 4 April 2009, McCartney performed the song during a benefit concert at New York's Radio City Music Hall and segued it into "With a Little Help From My Friends", sung by Starr.

On 9 February 2014, during a tribute show commemorating the Beatles' first appearance on The Ed Sullivan Show, 50 years earlier, McCartney again sang "Sgt. Pepper's Lonely Hearts Club Band" and Starr sang "With a Little Help from My Friends".

== Personnel ==
According to Ian MacDonald, Mark Lewisohn and Olivier Julien:

Full version

- Paul McCartney – lead vocal; lead and bass guitars
- John Lennon – harmony vocal, rhythm guitar
- George Harrison – harmony vocal, lead guitar
- Ringo Starr – drums
- George Martin – organ
- Neill Sanders – French horn
- James W. Buck – French horn
- Tony Randell – French horn
- John Burden – French horn

Reprise

- Paul McCartney – lead vocal, bass, Hammond organ
- John Lennon – lead vocal, rhythm guitar
- George Harrison – lead vocal, lead guitar
- Ringo Starr – lead vocal, drums, tambourine, maracas

== Certifications ==
Region	Certification	Certified units/sales
United Kingdom (BPI)	Silver	200,000^{‡}
^{‡} Sales+streaming figures based on certification alone.

== Cover versions ==
In 1967, Jimi Hendrix played the song live at the Saville Theatre in Shaftesbury Avenue, which was leased by Brian Epstein, only three days after it had been released on record, with McCartney and Harrison in the audience. Another live version by Hendrix recorded at the Isle of Wight Festival was included on a posthumous live album, Blue Wild Angel: Live at the Isle of Wight.

In 1988, hair metal band Zinatra played the song at an arena tour in Europe where they opened for then-former Van Halen frontman David Lee Roth. Zinatra also covered part of the song under the title "Peppermania" on the band's 2004 version of their self-titled debut album.

In 2007, Bryan Adams and Stereophonics recorded the album's two versions of the song for It Was 40 Years Ago Today, a television film with contemporary acts recording the album's songs using the same studio, technicians and recording techniques as the original.

In 2009, Cheap Trick released a live album and DVD called Sgt. Pepper Live, which is a live performance of the entire original album, including the title song and reprise.

In 2011, Robbie Williams performed the song on Take That's Progress tour, replacing "Sgt Pepper's Lonely Hearts Club Band" with "Robbie Williams and the Take That Band", and "Mr Martin told the Band to play" – a reference to Take That's manager in the 1990s, Nigel Martin-Smith.

In 2013, the song was performed by Ryder Lynn (Blake Jenner), Marley Rose (Melissa Benoist), Jake Puckerman (Jacob Artist), and Wade "Unique" Adams (Alex Newell) in the Glee episode "Tina in the Sky with Diamonds".

The Flaming Lips recorded the song on their track-for-track tribute album With a Little Help from My Fwends, released on 27 October 2014.

Glim Spanky recorded a cover of the song for Hello Goodbye, a 2016 tribute album to the Beatles.

== Sources ==
- The Beatles (2003). The Beatles Anthology (DVD). ASIN: B00008GKEG.
- Ansaldo, Michael (3 July 2005). "McCartney, U2 Rock Live 8". Rolling Stone. Archived from the original on 6 December 2008.
- Epstein, Dan (2007). "Review of Tripping the Live Fantastic". Amazon.com.
- Everett, Walter (1999). The Beatles as Musicians: Revolver through the Anthology. Oxford University Press. ISBN 0-19-512941-5.
- Haber, Dave (2007). "The Beatles Singles and EP Discography". The Internet Beatles Album. Archived from the original on 2 February 2007.
- Harry, Bill (2000). The Beatles Encyclopedia. Virgin Publishing. ISBN 0-7535-0481-2.
- Julien, Olivier (2008). Sgt. Pepper and the Beatles: it was forty years ago today. Ashgate Publishing. ISBN 978-0-7546-6708-7.
- Lewisohn, Mark (1988). The Beatles Recording Sessions. New York: Harmony Books. ISBN 0-517-57066-1.
- Lewisohn, Mark. Sessionography in Sgt Peppers Lonely Hearts Club Band [CD booklet]. Apple/EMI Records.
- "London Live 8 performances rated". BBC News. 3 July 2005.
- MacDonald, Ian (2005). Revolution in the Head: The Beatles' Records and the Sixties (Second Revised ed.). London: Pimlico (Rand). ISBN 1-84413-828-3.
- MacDonald, Ian (2008). Revolution in the Head: The Beatles' Records and the Sixties (Third Revised ed.). London: Vintage. ISBN 978-1-84413-828-9.
- Martin, George; Hornsby, Jeremy (1994). All You Need Is Ears. New York: St. Martin's Griffen. ISBN 0-312-11482-6.
- Miles, Barry (1997). Paul McCartney: Many Years From Now. New York: Henry Holt & Company. ISBN 0-8050-5249-6.
- "The night Jimi Hendrix played tribute to the Beatles". NME. 2007.
- "Why The 'Sgt. Pepper's' Cover Art Matters As Much As The Music". NPR. 2017.
- "Notebook of lyrics for sale". BBC News. 7 August 1998.
- "Paul McCartney in the 'Guinness Book of Records'". Softpedia. 2007. Archived from the original on 28 April 2007.
- Pollack, Alan W (21 November 1995). "Notes on "Sgt. Pepper's Lonely Hearts Club Band". Notes on ... Series. Archived from the original on 7 November 2007.
- Riley, Tim (2002). Tell Me Why: A Beatles commentary (Second ed.). Cambridge: Da Capo Press. ISBN 0-306-81120-0.
- "Review of Back in the US". Amazon.com. 2010.
- "Sergeant Pepper's 40th Anniversary". BBC News. 2007.
- "Sgt Pepper". The Beatles Interview Database. 2008.
- "Sgt. Pepper's Lonely Hearts Club Band (1978)". IMDb. 2007.
- Spitz, Bob (2005). The Beatles: The Biography. New York: Little, Brown and Company. ISBN 1-84513-160-6.
- Wallgren, Mark (1982). The Beatles on Record. New York: Simon & Schuster. ISBN 0-671-45682-2.
- Womack, Kenneth (2014). The Beatles Encyclopedia: Everything Fab Four. Santa Barbara, CA: ABC-CLIO. ISBN 978-0-313-39171-2.
