= Rupert and the Frog Song =

- Original release poster
- Directed by: Geoff Dunbar
- Written by: Paul McCartney
- Produced by: Paul McCartney
- Starring: Paul McCartney; Windsor Davies; June Whitfield
- Edited by: Tony Fish; Peter Hearn
- Music by: Paul McCartney; George Martin
- Production company: MPL Communications
- Distributed by: 20th Century Fox
- Release dates: October 23, 1984 (United States); November 28, 1984 (United Kingdom)
- Running time: 14 minutes
- Country: United Kingdom
- Language: English

Rupert and the Frog Song is a 1984 animated short film based on the comic strip character Rupert Bear, written and produced by Paul McCartney and directed by Geoff Dunbar.

The making of Rupert and the Frog Song began in 1981 and ended in 1983. The film was released in cinemas as an accompaniment to McCartney's film Give My Regards to Broad Street. Unlike the poorly received feature film, this short was highly acclaimed, winning a BAFTA award. The song "We All Stand Together" from the film's soundtrack reached No. 3 when released in the UK Singles Chart. It was re-released in 2004 as one of the segments of Paul McCartney: Music & Animation.

== Plot ==
Rupert Bear decides to head off for a walk on the hills. With his Mother's blessing, he sets off for a jolly trip, encountering his friends Edward Trunk and Bill Badger along the way, who are too busy to join him; Bill needs to look after his baby brother and Edward has to do some shopping. As Rupert reaches a hill, he props himself up against the trunk of an oak tree and enjoys the glory of the countryside. Suddenly, he finds himself enveloped by a rainbow cloud of butterflies previously masquerading as leaves on the oak tree, and all of them swarm away from the leafless tree towards a rocky outcrop; Rupert cannot resist following them. As he leaves, a large white barn owl and two black cats decide to follow him.

Upon the rocks, Rupert finds a large number of multicoloured frogs. He walks into a cave behind a waterfall and sees three signs: "Frogs only beyond this point", "Everything except frogs must be kept on a lead", and "Guard frogs operating". He sneaks into the palace, trying to avoid getting caught by the frog guards. There, he witnesses the Frog Song, an event that occurs only once in a few hundred years in which various frogs of all shapes and sizes come together and sing "We All Stand Together". Around the end, the frog King and Queen rise out of the water before the crowd to finish off the song. After a thunderous applause from the frogs, the owl, who had followed Rupert to find out where the frogs were hiding, launches itself for an attack on the royals, but Rupert manages to warn the frogs in time and they all quickly retreat, leaving the owl and the cats empty-handed and the palace completely empty. After hearing his mother call him, Rupert excitedly rushes home to tell his family about what he saw.

== Cast ==
- Paul McCartney (voice) – Rupert, Edward, Bill, Boy Frog
- June Whitfield (voice) – Rupert's Mother
- Windsor Davies (voice) – Rupert's Father, Father Frog

== Production ==
McCartney had been planning a Rupert film since at least the early 1970s. His company, McCartney Productions Ltd., acquired the film rights to the character on 11 April 1970, one day after McCartney announced he was leaving the Beatles. At one point, the song "Little Lamb Dragonfly," which was recorded in 1970 and released on the 1973 album Red Rose Speedway, was intended for the film.

== Release ==
The film was released on 26 October 1984 in the United States and in November in the United Kingdom and screened before McCartney's main feature film Give My Regards to Broad Street.

=== Home Media ===
The first VHS video, distributed by Virgin Video, was released simultaneously with the single "We All Stand Together" and became the biggest-selling video of 1985, as well as being nominated for the 'Best Music Video – Short Form' at the Grammy Awards in 1986. The video also included two other shorts with music by Linda McCartney: "Seaside Woman" (a song credited to Suzy and the Red Stripes) and "The Oriental Nightfish". In the United States, the film aired on the Disney Channel on September 20, 1986.

In September 2004, to commemorate its 20th anniversary, the film was released on the DVD Paul McCartney: Music & Animation. This version includes the opening of the music video for "We All Stand Together" as an introduction to the film. The scene shows McCartney in an old bedroom, where he opens a large chest and begins digging through it until he comes across a Rupert book. He takes it out of the chest, blows on it, and dust flies away from the book (a sparkle effect was added in the DVD version). McCartney opens the book, with writing on the inside cover revealing that it was his childhood copy. The page then turns to the title card. The print of this version is also matted, cropping the top and bottom of the image to an aspect ratio of 1.85:1 widescreen, which was how the film was exhibited theatrically.

In October 2020, McCartney announced a 4K restoration of the film, alongside a re-release of the picture disc single remastered by Abbey Road Studios, to celebrate the 100th anniversary of the Rupert character and was released on YouTube on 8 November 2020. No Blu-ray or Ultra HD Blu-ray have been released.

== Awards and nominations ==
In 1984, the year of its release, it won a UK BAFTA (British Academy Award) for Best Animated Short Film.
