= We All Stand Together =

1984 single by Paul McCartney

Single by Paul McCartney and the Frog Chorus
- B-side: "We All Stand Together (Humming Version)"
- Released: 5 November 1984
- Recorded: October–November 1980
- Studio: AIR, London
- Genre: Children's music
- Length: 4:25
- Label: Parlophone
- Songwriter: Paul McCartney
- Producer: George Martin

Paul McCartney singles chronology
"No More Lonely Nights" (1984)	"We All Stand Together" (1984)	"Spies Like Us" (1985)
"Freedom" (2001)	"Tropic Island Hum" / "We All Stand Together" (2004)	""Sgt. Pepper's Lonely Hearts Club Band" (with U2)" (2005)

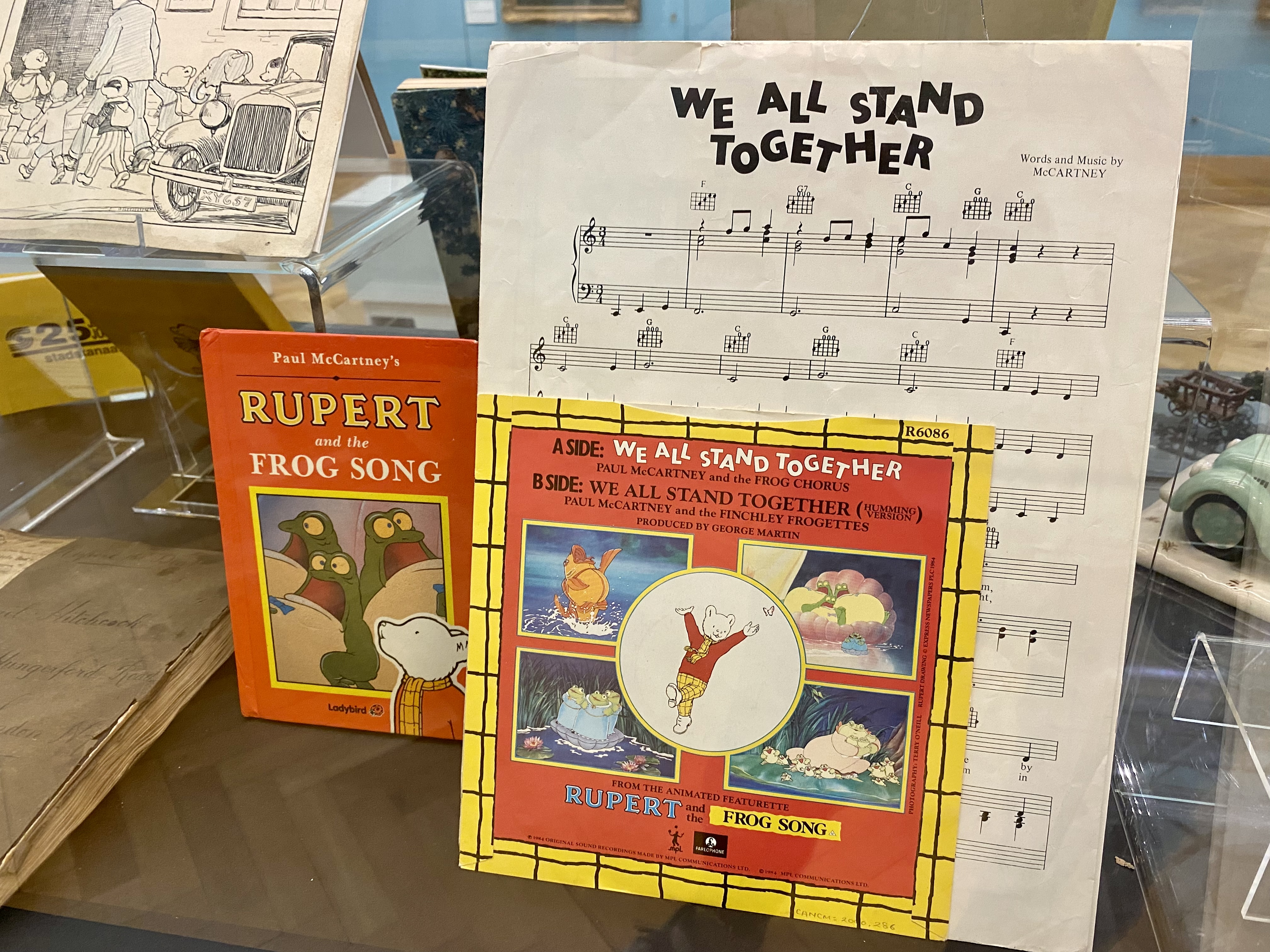
The single and sheet music of "We All Stand Together" at the Beaney House of Art and Knowledge in Canterbury, Kent

"We All Stand Together" (sometimes referred to as the Frog Song or the Frog Chorus) is a song by the English musician Paul McCartney and the Frog Chorus.

== History ==
"We All Stand Together" is from the animated film Rupert and the Frog Song and reached number three in the UK Singles Chart in 1984. The "Frog Chorus" backing on the song was provided by The King's Singers and the choir of St Paul's Cathedral. The B-side of the single contains a "Humming Version" of the song performed by the Finchley Frogettes.

The song re-entered the UK Singles Chart in 1985, one of three hits to do so that had originally charted in December 1984. ("Do They Know It's Christmas?" by Band Aid and "Last Christmas" by Wham! were the other two.)

Although intended purely as a children's song in the mould of the Beatles' "Yellow Submarine", "We All Stand Together" is sometimes derided as an example of McCartney's inconsequential songwriting by his critics. In a satirical cartoon by Stephen Collins of The Guardian in 2012, McCartney is shown recalling his creative partnership with John Lennon in the 1960s, before concluding: "It was a great time, y'know ... And then I went on to do The Frog Song."

Peter Kay performed the song on Britain's Got the Pop Factor... and Possibly a New Celebrity Jesus Christ Soapstar Superstar Strictly on Ice, his satire of TV talent shows.

== Release ==
Two shaped picture discs were issued on the 12 November 1984 and 1985, the only difference being a plain clear sleeve on the later version. In 1987, the song was included on the UK/Canada version of McCartney's compilation album All the Best! It also appears on the deluxe edition of his 2016 compilation album Pure McCartney. In October 2020, for the 100th anniversary of the Rupert character, the single was remastered for streaming and a vinyl re-release of the picture disc, alongside a 4K restoration of the accompanying short.

== Personnel ==
According to The Paul McCartney Project:

- Paul McCartney – vocals, backing vocals
- Eric Stewart – backing vocals
- Nigel Perrin – vocals
- Alastair Hume – vocals
- Bill Ives – vocals
- Anthony Holt – vocals
- Simon Carrington – vocals
- Brian Kay – vocals
- The London Community Gospel Choir – vocals
- The King's Singers – backing vocals
- John Barclay – trumpet
- Pete Beachill – euphonium
- Robin Williams – violin
- Pete Swinfield – flute
- Gary Kettel – timpani

== Charts ==
=== Weekly charts ===
Chart (1984–1985)	Peak position
Belgium (Ultratop 50 Flanders)	12
Ireland (IRMA)	3
Netherlands (Dutch Top 40)	12
Netherlands (Single Top 100)	7
UK Singles (Official Charts)	3

"We All Stand Together" re-charted in the UK and Ireland in 2004 alongside "Tropic Island Hum".

=== Year-end charts ===
Chart (1984)	Position
UK	14

Chart (1985)	Position
Belgium (Ultratop Flanders)	88
Netherlands (Dutch Top 40)	88

== Choirs with Purpose version ==
"We All Stand Together"

Single by Choirs with Purpose featuring Michelle McManus
- Released: 22 November 2017
- Recorded: November 2017
- Genre: Christmas music
- Songwriter: Paul McCartney

Michelle McManus singles chronology
"Take You There" (2012)	"We All Stand Together" (2017)

In 2017, Choirs with Purpose, a collection of a dozen charity choirs, assembled for a remake of "We All Stand Together". Their recording features Scottish singer Michelle McManus in a bid to top the UK Singles Chart Christmas chart and win the coveted British Christmas number one for 2017; it failed to make the top 100. Profits from the single were split equally between the participating choirs in aid of their own charity work.

The choirs that took part in the recording with McManus include:

- Anstee Bridge Choir
- Cystic Fibrosis Virtual Choir
- Daniel Spargo-Mabbs Foundation Choir
- Games Maker Choir
- Homelink Carers Choir
- Lewisham and Greenwich NHS Choir
- Lucy Lintott / MND Scotland Choir
- Maggies Cancer Centre (West London) Choir
- Missing People Choir
- Parrs Wood High School Harmony Group
- Pop Up Purpose Choir
- UK Hospices Choir
