= Wings discography =

Paul McCartney and Wings discography
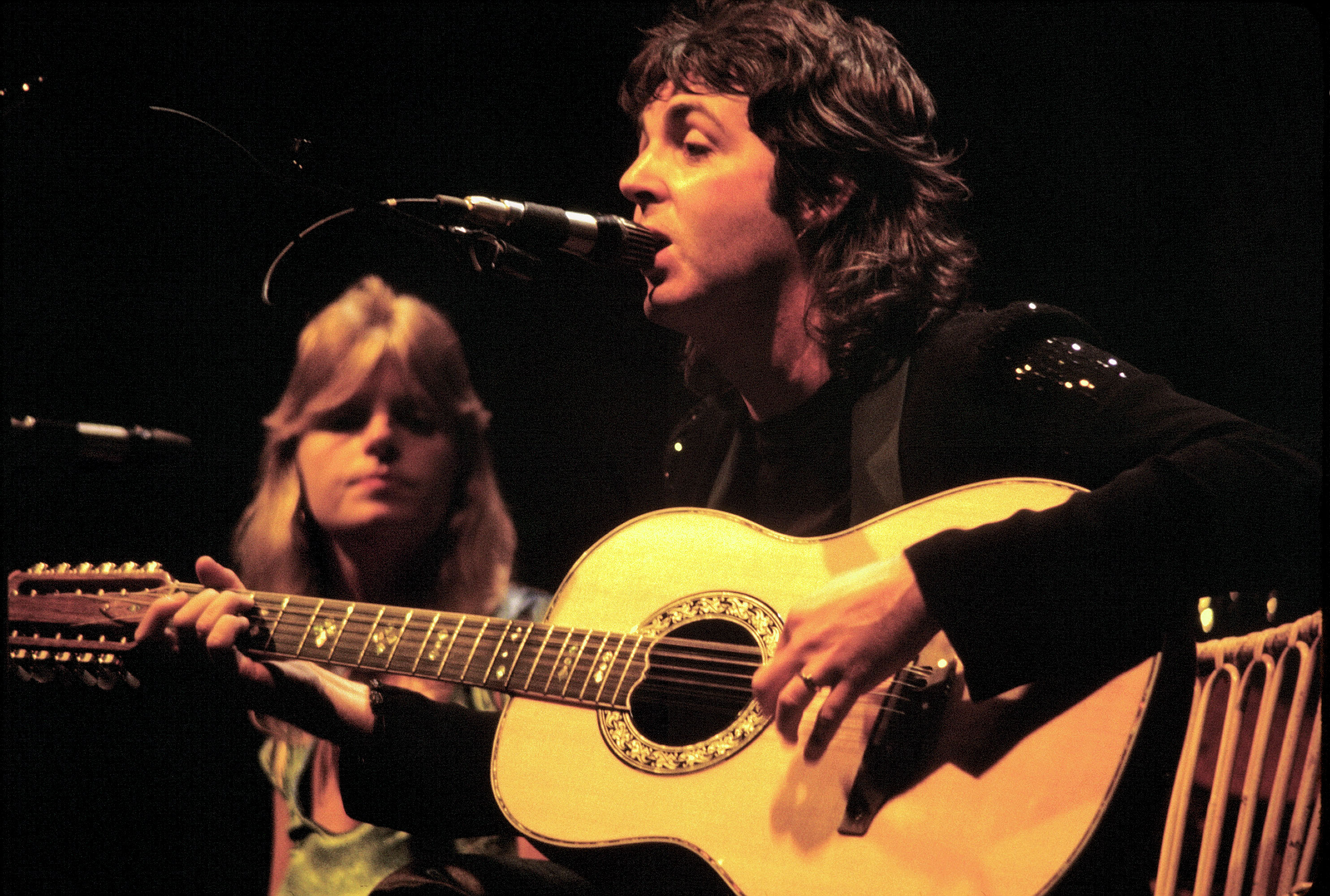
- Paul and Linda McCartney performing with Wings in 1976
- Studio albums: 7
- Live albums: 2
- Compilation albums: 3
- Singles: 29
- Video albums: 1
- Music videos: 19

The discography of the British-American rock band Wings, also known as Paul McCartney and Wings, consisted of seven studio albums, one live album, two compilation albums, 29 singles and 19 music videos. Founded in 1971 by former Beatle Paul McCartney, his wife Linda McCartney, Denny Laine and Denny Seiwell after the release of the McCartneys' album Ram, the band made their debut with Wild Life, released in December that year. The album garnered minimal commercial success and received generally poor reviews. In 1972, the band added Henry McCullough to the lineup and released several non-album singles, including "Give Ireland Back to the Irish", "Mary Had a Little Lamb", and "Hi, Hi, Hi", before releasing their second album, Red Rose Speedway, in 1973. While receiving mixed reviews, the album and its lead single, "My Love" were huge commercial successes, both reaching number one in the US charts. Wings' continued their commercial success with the title track to the James Bond film Live and Let Die. At the beginning of the recording sessions for their next album, McCullough and Seiwell left the band prompting the McCartneys and Laine to record their next album as a trio. Backed by the successful singles, "Jet" and the title track, the album, Band on the Run, became Wings' most successful album, reaching number one in both the US and the UK. The album also garnered highly positive reviews from critics and significantly restored McCartney's tarnished post-Beatles reputation.

Following Band on the Run, Scottish musician Jimmy McCulloch and English drummer Geoff Britton joined the band and recorded their next single, "Junior's Farm". During the sessions for their follow-up album, Britton left the band and was replaced by American musician Joe English. Backed by the number one single "Listen to What the Man Said", the album, Venus and Mars, wasn't as well-received as Band on the Run, but was nevertheless a commercial success, reaching number one. After Venus and Mars, the band embarked on a highly successful world tour in 1975. Their fifth album, Wings at the Speed of Sound, was recorded and released in between legs of the tour. The album saw the first time a Wings' album featured every member on lead vocals at least once. While the album received lukewarm reviews, it was a commercial success, supported by the number one singles, "Silly Love Songs" and "Let 'Em In". The live album Wings over America was released after the tour's end and was a huge commercial success, becoming the band's fifth number one album.

In late 1977, Wings' released "Mull of Kintyre" as a double A-side with "Girls' School". The single reached number one in the UK and remains one of the best selling UK singles of all time. After "Mull of Kintyre", the band released their next studio album, London Town, in 1978. Preceded by the successful hit, "With a Little Luck", the album was another commercial success for the group, and received positive reviews from critics. Despite strong album sales, the post-album singles, "I've Had Enough" and "London Town", were not as successful. After the album's release, McCulloch and English both left the group. The band followed London Town with the successful single "Goodnight Tonight" in 1979. The band's next album, Back to the Egg, saw the addition of Laurence Juber and Steve Holley to the lineup. Released in 1979, Back to the Egg was a major failure, received very negative reviews from critics and failed to produce any hits. After the band toured the UK, McCartney was arrested in Japan for possession of marijuana, cancelling a planned tour in 1980. After McCartney released his second solo album, McCartney II, Wings officially disbanded in 1981.

== Albums ==
=== Studio albums ===
Title	Album details	Peak chart positions									Certifications (sales thresholds)
Title	Album details	UK	AUS	CAN	GER	ITA	JPN	NLD	NOR	US	Certifications (sales thresholds)
Wild Life	Released: 7 December 1971; Label: Apple	11	3	5	47	25	15	6	4	10	US: Gold; CAN: Gold
Red Rose Speedway (Paul McCartney & Wings)	Released: 4 May 1973; Label: Apple	5	1	2	56	2	13	6	4	1	US: Gold; UK: Gold; CAN: Platinum
Band on the Run (Paul McCartney & Wings)	Released: 5 December 1973; Label: Apple	1	1	1	15	18	11	5	1	1	US: 3× Platinum; UK: Platinum; FRA: Gold; CAN: Platinum; UK: Gold (Remastered in 2010)
Venus and Mars	Released: 27 May 1975; Label: Capitol	1	2	1	11	11	9	5	1	1	US: Platinum; UK: Platinum; CAN: Platinum
Wings at the Speed of Sound	Released: 26 March 1976; Label: Capitol	2	2	1	32	8	4	3	2	1	US: Platinum; UK: Gold; FRA: Gold
London Town	Released: 31 March 1978; Label: Parlophone (UK) Capitol (US)	4	2	3	6	8	4	1	2	2	US: Platinum; AUS: Platinum; UK: Gold; FRA: Gold; GER: Gold; NLD: Platinum
Back to the Egg	Released: 8 June 1979; Label: Parlophone (worldwide) Columbia (North America)	6	3	2	16	10	7	11	5	8	US: Platinum; UK: Gold; CAN: 2× Platinum

=== Live albums ===
Title	Album details	Peak chart positions										Certifications (sales thresholds)
Title	Album details	UK	AUS	AUT	CAN	GER	JPN	NLD	NOR	NZL	US	Certifications (sales thresholds)
Wings over America	Released: 10 December 1976; Label: Capitol	8	2	12	1	9	4	10	7	3	1	US: Platinum; UK: Gold; CAN: Platinum
One Hand Clapping (Paul McCartney & Wings)	Released: 14 June 2024; Label: Apple	10	—	—	4	11	10	—	—	—	74	

=== Compilation albums ===
Title	Album	Peak chart positions										Certifications
Title	Album	UK	AUS	CAN	GER	JPN	NLD	NOR	NZL	SWE	US	Certifications
Wings Greatest	Released: 2 November 1978	5	8	25	18	24	18	20	16	32	29	US: Platinum; UK: Platinum; CAN: Platinum
Wingspan: Hits and History (Paul McCartney)	Released: 7 May 2001	5	14	4	20	13	32	5	13	49	2	US: 2× Platinum; AUS: Gold; NZL: Gold; UK: Gold; US: Gold (Video LongForm)
Wings (Paul McCartney & Wings)	Released: 7 November 2025; Label: Capitol	12	33	—	15	28	26	—	—	—	68	

== Singles ==
Year	Title	Peak chart positions										Certifications	Album
Year	Title	UK	US	US AC	AUS	CAN	GER	JPN	NLD	NOR	NZ	Certifications	Album
1972	"Give Ireland Back to the Irish" "Give Ireland Back to the Irish" (instrumental)	16	21	—	17	46	—	31	—	—	—		non-album singles
1972	"Mary Had a Little Lamb" "Little Woman Love"	9	28	29	17	41	—	41	13	—	13		non-album singles
1972	"Hi, Hi, Hi" "C Moon"	5	10	—	29	5	16	26	6	4	20		non-album singles
1973	"My Love" "The Mess" (live)	9	1	1	5	2	43	39	12	7	3	US: Gold	Red Rose Speedway
1973	"Live and Let Die" "I Lie Around"	9	2	8	5	2	31	25	29	4	20	UK: Silver; US: Gold	Live and Let Die
1973	"Helen Wheels" "Country Dreamer"	12	10	—	17	4	33	56	23	—	14		Band on the Run (US only)
1973	"Jet" "Let Me Roll It" (UK & 2nd pressings of US) "Mamunia" (US 1st pressings only)	7	7	—	—	5	6	39	10	9	2	UK: Gold; RMNZ: Platinum	Band on the Run
1973	"Mrs Vandebilt" (Not a US/UK single) "Bluebird"	—	—	—	41	—	33	—	7	—	9		Band on the Run
1974	"Band on the Run" "Zoo Gang" (UK) "Nineteen Hundred and Eighty-Five" (US)	3	1	22	—	1	22	58	7	—	1	US: Gold; UK: Gold	Band on the Run
1974	"Junior's Farm" "Sally G"	16	3	—	12	10	—	77	—	9	3		non-album singles
1974	"Walking in the Park with Eloise" "Bridge On the River Suite" (both sides credited to The Country Hams)	—	—	—	—	—	—	—	—	—	—		non-album singles
1975	"Listen to What the Man Said" "Love in Song"	6	1	8	14	1	42	46	18	3	7	US: Gold	Venus and Mars
1975	"Letting Go" "You Gave Me the Answer"	41	39	—	34	62	—	64	—	—	—		Venus and Mars
1975	"Venus and Mars"/"Rock Show" "Magneto and Titanium Man"	—	12	—	34	12	—	99	—	—	—		Venus and Mars
1976	"Silly Love Songs" "Cook of the House"	2	1	1	20	1	14	66	11	9	8	US: Gold; UK: Silver; RMNZ: Gold	Wings at the Speed of Sound
1976	"Let 'Em In" "Beware My Love"	2	3	1	65	3	29	—	25	—	13	US: Gold; UK: Silver	Wings at the Speed of Sound
1977	"Maybe I'm Amazed" (live) "Soily" (live)	28	10	—	—	9	—	61	—	—	—		Wings over America
1977	"Seaside Woman" "B Side to Seaside" (both sides credited to Suzy and the Red Stripes)	—	59	—	—	—	—	—	—	—	—		non-album singles
1977	"Mull of Kintyre" "Girls' School"	1	— 33	45 —	1	44; 34	1	69	1	2	1	UK: 2× Platinum; GER: Gold	non-album singles
1978	"With a Little Luck" "Backwards Traveller/Cuff Link"	5	1	5	11	1	17	—	11	6	14	UK: Silver	London Town
1978	"I've Had Enough" "Deliver Your Children"	42	25	—	99	24	—	—	13	—	—		London Town
1978	"London Town" "I'm Carrying"	60	39	17	—	43	—	—	—	—	—		London Town
1979	"Goodnight Tonight" "Daytime Nighttime Suffering"	5	5	30	6	2	34	77	24	—	6	US: Gold; CAN: Gold; UK: Silver	non-album single
1979	"Old Siam, Sir" (UK/Europe single only) "Spin It On"	35	—	—	—	—	—	—	—	—	—		Back to the Egg
1979	"Getting Closer" "Baby's Request" (UK) "Spin It On" (US)	60	20	—	57	18	—	—	29	—	—		Back to the Egg
1979	"Arrow Through Me" (US/Canada single only) "Old Siam, Sir"	—	29	—	—	27	—	—	—	—	—		Back to the Egg
1980	"Coming Up" (Paul McCartney) "Coming Up (Live at Glasgow)" (Paul McCartney & Wings) "Lunchbox/Odd Sox" (Paul McCartney & Wings)	2	1	48	2	1	11	66	20	2	2	US: Gold; UK: Silver	McCartney II
1985	"Spies Like Us" (Paul McCartney) "My Carnival" (Paul McCartney & Wings)	13	7	—	55	24	—	—	—	—	—		non-album single
1990	"Put It There" (Paul McCartney) "Mama's Little Girl" "Same Time Next Year" (12" single only) (Paul McCartney & Wings)	32	—	11	—	9	60	—	82	—	—		Flowers in the Dirt
2016	"Nineteen Hundred and Eighty-Five" remix (Wings vs. Timo Maas and James Teej)	—	—	—	—	—	—	—	—	—	—		non-album single
"—" denotes singles that did not chart or were not released in respective region

== Other appearances ==
Year	Album	Artist	Comment
1973	Live and Let Die	George Martin	The soundtrack album of the James Bond film includes the title song performed by Wings.
1974	McGear	Mike McGear	An album by Paul McCartney's brother Michael. It featured him on lead vocals and as co-lyricist, with Wings as his backing band.
1975	Sold Out	The Scaffold	"Liverpool Lou" and the non-album B-side "Ten Years After on Strawberry Jam" were performed by Wings.
1977	Holly Days	Denny Laine	An album of Buddy Holly covers recorded by the three core Wings members (Paul, Linda McCartney and Denny Laine), with Laine on lead vocals.
1980	Japanese Tears	Denny Laine	Three songs on the album, "Send Me The Heart", "I Would Only Smile" and "Weep For Love", were recorded by different incarnations of Wings, with Denny Laine on lead vocals.
1981	Concerts for the People of Kampuchea	Various Artists	A live album recorded at the Hammersmith Odeon, London, in December 1979 to benefit Cambodian refugees. The album includes three songs performed by Wings ("Got to Get You into My Life", "Every Night", "Coming Up") and three songs performed by the McCartney-led supergroup Rockestra ("Lucille", "Let It Be", "Rockestra Theme")
1982	Standard Time	Laurence Juber	The song "Maisie" is performed by Wings.
1998	Wide Prairie	Linda McCartney	Eight tracks on the album featured different incarnations of Wings; previously unreleased "Wide Prairie", "New Orleans", "Love's Full Glory", "I Got Up" and "Oriental Nightfish"; two tracks that were originally released under the name Suzy and the Red Stripes, "Seaside Woman" and "B-Side to Seaside"; and "Cook of the House" from Wings at the Speed of Sound
2003	Music from the Motion Picture The In-Laws	Various Artists	The soundtrack to the 2003 remake of the film "The In-Laws". It includes three songs performed by Wings; the previously unreleased "A Love for You", an alternate version of "Live and Let Die", and "I'm Carrying" from London Town.

== Videography ==
=== Concert films ===
Title	Album details	Notes
Rockshow (Paul McCartney & Wings)	Released: 26 November 1980	Concert film of the 1976 Wings Over America tour.
The Bruce McMouse Show	Released: 7 December 2018 (DVD/Blu-ray); 21 January 2019 (theatrical)	Concert film of the 1972 Wings Over Europe tour interspersed with animated scenes, produced from 1972 to 1977

=== Music videos ===
Year	Title	Director
1972	"Mary Had a Little Lamb" (4 versions)	Nicholas Ferguson
1972	"Hi, Hi, Hi"	Steven Turner
1972	"C Moon"	Steven Turner
1973	"My Love"	Mick Rock
1973	"Helen Wheels"	Michael Lindsay-Hogg
1974	"Mamunia"	Jim Quick
1974	"Band on the Run"	Michael Coulson
1974	"Junior's Farm"	David Litchfield
1976	"Silly Love Songs"	Gordon Bennett
1977	"Mull of Kintyre" (version 1)	Michael Lindsay-Hogg
1977	"Mull of Kintyre" (version 2)	Nicholas Ferguson
1978	"With a Little Luck"	Michael Lindsay-Hogg
1978	"I've Had Enough"	Keith McMillan
1978	"London Town"	Michael Lindsay-Hogg
1979	"Goodnight Tonight" (3 versions)	Keith McMillan
1979	"Getting Closer"	Keith McMillan
1979	"Spin It On"	Keith McMillan
1979	"Again and Again and Again"	Keith McMillan
1979	"Old Siam, Sir"	Keith McMillan
1979	"Arrow Through Me"	Keith McMillan
1979	"Winter Rose / Love Awake"	Keith McMillan
1979	"Baby's Request"	Keith McMillan
1979	"Rockestra Theme"	Barry Chattington and Keith McMillan

== Documentaries ==
Year	Title	Notes
1979	Wings Over the World: Released: 1979	Documentary about the Wings Over the World tour.
1980	Concert for Kampuchea: Released: August 1980	Concert film of the best live performances that took place at the Hammersmith Odeon, in December 1979, to raise money for Cambodia.
1981	Back to the Egg: Released: 10 June 1981	TV special containing music videos to promote the album Back to the Egg.
2001	Wingspan – An Intimate Portrait: Released: 13 November 2001	Documentary about Paul McCartney's musical career from the Beatles' split up until the disbanding of Wings.
2026	Man on the Run: Released: 25 February 2026	Documentary about Paul McCartney's life while he was Wings' bandleader.

== See also ==
- Paul McCartney discography

== Bibliography ==
- Bronson, Fred (2003). The Billboard book of number 1 hits. Billboard Books. ISBN 978-0-8230-7677-2.
- Emerick, Geoff (2006). Massey, Howard (ed.). Here, There and Everywhere: My Life Recording the Music of the Beatles. Gotham. ISBN 978-1-59240-269-4.
- Frontani, Michael (2009). "The Solo Years". In Womack, Kenneth (ed.). The Cambridge Companion to the Beatles. Cambridge, UK: Cambridge University Press. ISBN 978-0-521-68976-2.
- Madinger, Chip; Easter, Mark (2000). Eight Arms to Hold You: The Solo Beatles Compendium. Chesterfield, MO: 44.1 Productions. ISBN 0-615-11724-4.
- McGee, Garry (2003). Band on the Run: A History of Paul McCartney and Wings. New York: Taylor Trade Publishing. ISBN 0-87833-304-5.
- Miles, Barry; Badman, Keith, eds. (2001). The Beatles Diary After the Break-Up: 1970–2001 (reprint ed.). London: Music Sales Group. ISBN 9780711983076.
- Mulligan, Kate Siobhan (2010). The Beatles: A Musical Biography. Santa Barbara, Calif.: Greenwood. ISBN 978-0-313-37686-3.
- Perone, James E. (17 October 2012). The Album: A Guide to Pop Music's Most Provocative, Influential, and Important Creations. ABC-CLIO. ISBN 978-0-313-37907-9.
- Rodriguez, Robert (2010). Fab Four FAQ 2.0: The Beatles' Solo Years, 1970–1980. Milwaukee, WI: Backbeat Books. ISBN 978-1-4165-9093-4.
- Whitburn, Joel (2002). Top Adult Contemporary: 1961-2001. Record Research. ISBN 978-0-8982-0149-9.
