= Back to the Egg (TV programme) =

- The opening title used for the special
- Genre: Musical
- Developed by: MPL Communications
- Composers: Paul McCartney except Denny Laine ("Again and Again and Again")
- Country of origin: United Kingdom
- Original language: English
- No. of episodes: 1

Production
- Running time: 31 minutes approx.

Original release
- Network: WTBS
- Release: November 1979
- Network: BBC1
- Release: June 1981

Related
- James Paul McCartney; Wings Over the World

Back to the Egg is a TV special containing music videos to promote the band Wings' 1979 album Back to the Egg. The program was first broadcast on US television stations in November 1979, but its UK airing, on BBC1, was delayed until June 1981, two months after the band disbanded. The locations used for filming include Lympne Castle and Camber Sands, both on the south-east coast of England.

The videos for "Goodnight Tonight" – a song that had been a non-album single shortly before the release of Back to the Egg – and "Baby's Request" were issued on The McCartney Years DVD box set in 2007. The full special has yet to be released on DVD, but can be found on YouTube.

== Production ==
Having completed the year-long sessions for Back to the Egg in April 1979, the five members of Wings began shooting music videos for the album with film company Keef & Co. in June that year. In addition to serving as promotional clips for their respective songs, the videos were to be compiled into a television special, coinciding with Wings' UK tour late in 1979 – the first leg of a planned world tour.

The production team hired by band leader Paul McCartney included Keith MacMillan, Phil Davey and Hugh Scott-Symonds. According to author Keith Badman, MacMillan decided on the seven songs chosen for filming. Among these were "Old Siam, Sir", "Getting Closer" and "Arrow Through Me" – all tracks that would be issued as singles off Back to the Egg. The eighth selection in the TV special would be a clip for "Goodnight Tonight", a non-album single released in March 1979, to coincide with the airing of the band's Wings Over the World TV film. The "Goodnight Tonight" video was also produced by MacMillan's company and dated from a 3 April shoot at London's Hammersmith Palais.

=== Filming ===
Filming began on 4 June at Lympne Castle in Kent, where Wings had recorded part of the album. (Note: According to Beatles Diary compiler Keith Badman, the Back to the Egg videos were shot between 4 and 13 June, yet authors Chip Madinger and Mark Easter give the dates as 28 May to 6 June.) The video shot that day was for "Old Siam, Sir", with filming taking place in the hall of the castle.

On 5 June, the production relocated to the inside of an aircraft hangar, situated at a private airfield close to Lympne. Here, the band filmed clips for "Spin It On" and "Getting Closer". Invited to attend that day, Mark Williams of Melody Maker later wrote of drummer Steve Holly being "dolled up as a First World War fighter pilot", and commented on the aviation theme: "The Wings logo stands resplendent on the front of a hangar as some sort of loose visual pun; inside the crew are wrestling with draped parachutes and lighting gantries festooned above a sound stage." During breaks in filming, Williams noted, the band gave impromptu live performances, "entertaining what appears to be half the population of East Kent, who wander in and out of aircraft hangars and fields of kale where the action takes place".

Also on 5 June, the video for "Again and Again and Again" was shot in one of the nearby fields. With the crew working late into the night, further scenes for "Getting Closer" included footage of a car driving on the airstrip.

The production returned to Lympne Castle on 6 June, where Wings filmed the "Winter Rose/Love Awake" video. Two days later, the band drove to Camber Sands in East Sussex, to shoot a clip for "Baby's Request", before heading to London for the upcoming Back to the Egg press launch.

Filming resumed on 13 June, now at Keef & Co.'s London studios, where the band taped the video for "Arrow Through Me" and shot additional footage for "Getting Closer". Film was also created for the opening and closing segments of the TV special, incorporating images from the album's cover artwork, which was designed by Hipgnosis.

== Broadcast ==
Back to the Egg first aired in America, syndicated nationally on WTBS, during November and December 1979. The first UK broadcast was on BBC1 on 10 June 1981. By that time, Wings had discontinued, following McCartney's arrest at Tokyo's Narita Airport the previous year, for possession of drugs, and the subsequent cancellation of the group's world tour.

Although the full special has yet to receive an official release, the clips for "Goodnight Tonight" and "Baby's Request" appeared on disc one of the 2007 DVD box set The McCartney Years.

== Songs ==
- "Getting Closer"
- "Baby's Request"
- "Old Siam, Sir"
- "Winter Rose/Love Awake"
- "Spin It On"
- "Again and Again and Again"
- "Arrow Through Me"
- "Goodnight Tonight"

== Sources ==
- Keith Badman, The Beatles Diary Volume 2: After the Break-Up 1970–2001, Omnibus Press (London, 2001; ISBN 0-7119-8307-0).
- Alan Clayson, Paul McCartney, Sanctuary (London, 2003; ISBN 1-86074-482-6).
- Chip Madinger & Mark Easter, Eight Arms to Hold You: The Solo Beatles Compendium, 44.1 Productions (Chesterfield, MO, 2000; ISBN 0-615-11724-4).
- Robert Rodriguez, Fab Four FAQ 2.0: The Beatles' Solo Years, 1970–1980, Backbeat Books (Milwaukee, WI, 2010; ISBN 978-1-4165-9093-4).
- Howard Sounes, Fab: An Intimate Life of Paul McCartney, HarperCollins (London, 2010; ISBN 978-0-00-723705-0).
