= Again and Again and Again =

Song by Wings

from the album Back to the Egg
- Released: 8 June 1979
- Studio: Spirit of Ranachan, Campbeltown
- Length: 3:34
- Label: Parlophone (UK); Columbia (US)
- Songwriter: Denny Laine
- Producers: Paul McCartney; Chris Thomas

Music video
- "Again and Again and Again" on YouTube

"Again and Again and Again" is a song written by Denny Laine and performed by Paul McCartney and Wings, released on 8 June 1979 by Parlophone in the UK, and Columbia Records in the US. It is included as the fifth track on their seventh and final studio album Back to the Egg.

== Background and recording ==
Laine wrote "Again and Again and Again" originally as two unfinished songs, the first being "Again and Again and Again", with the second being titled "You Don't Wanna Be My Little Woman", but it was Paul McCartney's suggestion to merge the two songs together, similar to Paul and Linda McCartney's medley "Uncle Albert/Admiral Halsey" from the album Ram. "You Don't Wanna Be My Little Woman", which generated the verses of the completed song, used a simple C major chord progression and had lyrics reflecting teenage frustration with love. The original version of "Again and Again and Again" formed the chorus of the completed song, and was more complex harmonically and had lyrics about a relationship falling apart. The song was recorded in July 1978 at the Spirit of Ranachan in Campbeltown, and was recorded in a single take, effectively making it a live in-studio track, and recorded with a minimal amount of overdubs.

Laine played electric rhythm guitar, Laurence Juber played lead guitar on a Fender Stratocaster, Paul McCartney played bass guitar, Linda McCartney played Hammond B3 organ and Steve Holley played drums. Juber described his lead guitar sound as a "Steve Cropper meets George Harrison" soul-pop sound.

Mixing took place over several sessions in 1978 and 1979, and was completed on 1 March 1979.

== Music and lyrics ==
Rolling Stone writer Timothy White calls it a "somewhat engaging rock segment that could have been built into a comprehensible song." The lyrics discuss a man losing control of his relationship.

== Promotional film ==
The promotional film was shot on 29 May 1979 by Keith McMillan, as the sixth of seven videos shot by McMillan and released for the album. It was shot in a field near a hangar at the Eagle Parachute Club; promotional films for "Spin It On" and "Getting Closer" were shot at the hangar the same day. The film is a simple performance video, with the band miming the song in the field of waist-high yellow rapeseed.

== Critical reception ==
Beatle biographer John Blaney called it a "competent but uninspired Laine composition, and one of the weaker songs on the album." Alex Hopper ranked it at number 3 in his ranking of the best Denny Laine song in celebration of his music, stating that "Wings’ affection for the blues is deeply apparent in this Back To The Egg cut. Laine again takes over lead vocals, proving his chops in that department. The ear-worm melody of this track could rival any of the band’s biggest hits". The Pittsburgh Post-Gazette critic Barry Paris calls it a "well-executed, old style piece of rock 'n' roll", calling it better than "Old Slam, Sir", which follows "Again and Again and Again" on the album. White considered it "the only track deserving of special mention" on Back to the Egg. Ultimate Classic Rock critic Nick DeRiso rated it as Laine's 3rd best song, behind "Go Now" from his time with the Moody Blues and the Wings' song "Time to Hide", noting the song's "punk-style edge".

== Live performances ==
"Again and Again and Again" was included in the setlist for Wings UK Tour 1979. It was one of five songs from Back to the Egg included in the setlist, the others being "Getting Closer", "Spin It On", "Arrow Through Me" and "Old Siam, Sir". It was also one of three songs on which Laine took the lead vocals (the others being "Go Now" and "No Words").

== Personnel ==
According to author John Blaney:

- Denny Laine – guitar, vocals
- Paul McCartney – bass, keyboards, backing vocals
- Linda McCartney – keyboards, backing vocals
- Laurence Juber – guitar
- Steve Holley – drums
