= Concerts for the People of Kampuchea =

1979 series of concerts in London, England

- Poster to the concerts
- Date: 26–29 December 1979
- Duration: 4 days
- Venue: Hammersmith Odeon
- Location: London, England
- Type: Benefit concert series
- Organised by: Paul McCartney; Kurt Waldheim
- Filmed by: Anthony Richmond
- Participants: The Blockheads; The Clash; Elvis Costello; Ian Dury; The Pretenders; Matumbi; Robert Plant; Queen; Rockpile; The Specials; Wings; The Who

Concerts for the People of Kampuchea was a series of concerts featuring Wings, Queen, the Clash, the Pretenders, the Who, Elvis Costello, and many more artists which took place at the Hammersmith Odeon in London during December 1979 to raise money for the victims of the ongoing war in Cambodia (then called Kampuchea in English). The event was organised by Paul McCartney and Kurt Waldheim, and it involved artists such as McCartney and the Who as well as punk acts like the Clash and the Pretenders. The last of the concerts was the last concert of Wings. An album and EP were released in 1981, and the best of the concerts were released as a film, Concert for Kampuchea.

Rockestra was a McCartney-led supergroup of at least 30 English rockers. The back cover of the LP states the Rockestra performers include:

John Bonham, Billy Bremner, Gary Brooker, Howie Casey, Tony Dorsey, Dave Edmunds, Steve Holley, James Honeyman-Scott, Steve Howard, Kenney Jones, John Paul Jones, Laurence Juber, Denny Laine, Ronnie Lane, Linda McCartney, Paul McCartney, Robert Plant, Thadeus Richard, Bruce Thomas, Pete Townshend.

== Background ==
The idea for a benefit concert for Indo-Chinese refugees originated with American promoter Sid Bernstein, who sought to have the Beatles reunite for a three-part reunion concert to be held in Jerusalem, Cairo, and New York to raise $500 million for Vietnamese boat people. Bernstein took out an advertisement in the 9 September 1979 New York Times appealing to the Beatles. Following numerous (erroneous) press stories that one or more Beatles had agreed to some version of this proposal, United Nations Secretary-General Kurt Waldheim sent McCartney a letter asking if he would participate in a benefit concert; McCartney agreed. McCartney turned to promoter Harvey Goldsmith—who was already exploring the idea of a series of concerts to close out the 1970s—to arrange the details.

== Concerts ==
=== 26 December ===
- Queen

=== 27 December ===
- Ian Dury and the Blockheads (with guest Mick Jones on "Sweet Gene Vincent")
- Matumbi
- The Clash

=== 28 December ===
- The Pretenders
- The Specials
- The Who

=== 29 December ===
- Elvis Costello & the Attractions
- Rockpile (with guest Robert Plant on "Little Sister")
- Wings
- Rockestra

== Selected set lists ==
=== Queen ===
1. "Jailhouse Rock"
2. "We Will Rock You" (fast version)
3. "Let Me Entertain You"
4. "Somebody to Love"
5. "If You Can't Beat Them"
6. "Mustapha"
7. "Death on Two Legs"
8. "Killer Queen"
9. "I'm in Love with My Car"
10. "Get Down, Make Love"
11. "You're My Best Friend"
12. "Save Me"
13. "Now I'm Here"
14. "Don't Stop Me Now"
15. "Spread Your Wings"
16. "Love of My Life"
17. "'39"
18. "Keep Yourself Alive"
19. Drums solo
20. Guitar solo with parts of "Silent Night"
21. "Brighton Rock" reprise
22. "Crazy Little Thing Called Love"
23. "Bohemian Rhapsody"
24. "Tie Your Mother Down"
25. "Sheer Heart Attack"
26. "We Will Rock You"
27. "We Are the Champions"
28. "God Save the Queen" (tape)

=== Ian Dury & the Blockheads ===
1. "Clevor Trevor"
2. "Inbetweenies"
3. "Don't Ask Me"
4. "Reasons to Be Cheerful"
5. "Sink My Boats"
6. "Waiting for Your Taxi"
7. "This Is What We Find"
8. "Mischief"
9. "What a Waste"
10. "Hit Me with Your Rhythm Stick"
11. "Sweet Gene Vincent" (with Mick Jones)

=== The Clash ===
1. "Clash City Rockers"
2. "Brand New Cadillac"
3. "Safe European Home"
4. "Jimmy Jazz"
5. "Clampdown"
6. "The Guns of Brixton"
7. "Train in Vain"
8. "Wrong 'Em Boyo"
9. "Koka Kola"
10. "(White Man) In Hammersmith Palais"
11. "Stay Free"
12. "Bankrobber"
13. "Janie Jones"
14. "Complete Control"
15. "Armagideon Time"
16. "London Calling"

=== The Specials ===
1. "(Dawning of a) New Era"
2. "Do the Dog"
3. "Monkey Man"
4. "Concrete Jungle"
5. "Too Hot"
6. "Doesn't Make It Alright"
7. "Too Much Too Young"
8. "Guns of Navarone"
9. "Little Bitch"
10. "A Message to You Rudy"
11. "Nite Club"
12. "Gangsters"
13. "Longshot Kick the Bucket"
14. "Skinhead Moonstomp"
15. "Madness"

=== The Who ===
1. "Substitute"
2. "I Can't Explain"
3. "Baba O'Riley"
4. "The Punk and the Godfather"
5. "My Wife"
6. "Sister Disco"
7. "Behind Blue Eyes"
8. "Music Must Change"
9. "Drowned"
10. "Who Are You"
11. "5.15"
12. "Pinball Wizard"
13. "See Me Feel Me"
14. "Long Live Rock"
15. "My Generation"
16. "I'm a Man"
17. "Hoochie Coochie Man"
18. "Sparks"
19. "I Can See for Miles"
20. "I Don't Want to Be an Old Man"
21. "Won't Get Fooled Again"
22. "Summertime Blues"
23. "Dancing in the Street"
24. "Dance It Away"
25. "The Real Me"

=== Rockpile ===
1. "Three Time Loser"
2. "Little Sister" (with Robert Plant)
3. "Crawling from the Wreckage"
4. "Little Sister"

=== Wings ===
1. "Got to Get You into My Life"
2. "Getting Closer"
3. "Every Night"
4. "Again and Again and Again"
5. "I've Had Enough"
6. "No Words"
7. "Cook of the House"
8. "Old Siam, Sir"
9. "Maybe I'm Amazed"
10. "The Fool on the Hill"
11. "Hot as Sun"
12. "Spin It On"
13. "Twenty Flight Rock"
14. "Go Now"
15. "Arrow Through Me"
16. "Coming Up"
17. "Goodnight Tonight"
18. "Yesterday"
19. "Mull of Kintyre"
20. "Band on the Run"

=== Rockestra ===
1. "Rockestra Theme"
2. "Let It Be"
3. "Lucille"
4. "Rockestra Theme" (reprise)
