= Baby's Request =

1979 single by Wings

- Single cover with image from the music video

Single by Wings

from the album Back to the Egg
- A-side: "Getting Closer"
- Released: 17 August 1979
- Recorded: 17 October 1978
- Studio: Abbey Road Studios, London
- Length: 2:12
- Label: Parlophone
- Songwriter: Paul McCartney
- Producers: Paul McCartney; Chris Thomas

Wings singles chronology
"Old Siam, Sir" (1979)	"Baby's Request" (1979)	"Arrow Through Me" (1979)

"Baby's Request" is a song written by Paul McCartney that was first released on Wings' 1979 album Back to the Egg. It was also released as a double-A sided single with "Getting Closer" in the UK. A version was also included on the deluxe edition of McCartney's 2012 solo album Kisses on the Bottom.

== Background ==
McCartney originally wrote the song in hopes that the Mills Brothers, a group that was most popular in the 1930s and 1940s, would record it. Paul had been a fan of the Mills brothers as a child, and when he and Linda McCartney attended a Mills Brothers concert in Nice, France in August 1978, they met the band backstage afterwards and one of the brothers suggested he write a song for them.

Wings initially recorded the song during the Back to the Egg sessions on 16 October 1978, although it was intended as a demo for the Mills Brothers and not for the album itself. Another version was recorded on 17 October. McCartney's lead vocals as well as Linda's and Denny Laine's harmony vocals were overdubbed on 19 October. Paul also overdubbed a synthesizer reproducing a trombone solo between the two bridges of the song, despite trombonist Don Lusher recording in the studio next door.

When Paul sent the Mills Brothers the demo, their manager responded by saying that they would record the song if Paul paid them $1000. Since Paul had not expected to have to pay to have the song recorded, he decided to use it on Back to the Egg instead, where it replaced a song called "Cage". He mixed the song for the album on 26 February 1979.

== Music and lyrics ==
"Baby's Request" is in the key of G major. The structure begins with an intro, followed by two verses, then a bridge, then the synthesizer solo imitating a trombone using the verse melody, then another brige and finally one more verse. The music uses a 1930s and 1940s retro swing band style, similar to that McCartney had used for songs such as "Honey Pie" and "You Gave Me the Answer". It also has a jazz feel, which is accomplished using elements such as augmented triads, seventh chords and ninth chords. McCartney biographer John Blaney noted that the Wings' new guitarist at the time, Laurence Juber had played in the National Youth Jazz Orchestra and credits some of the jazz phrasing to him. McCartney biographers Allan Kozinn and Adrian Sinclair described the melody as "gentle" and "eminently croonable". The melody of the verses has a large range of notes, from low D to high E.

Rather than play his electric bass, Paul played his Bill Black double bass. Denny Laine played piano, Juber played his Gibson ES-335 guitar and Steve Holley contributed to the 1930s/1940s feel by playing drums using brushes.

The lyrics of "Baby's Request" describe a man whose children are all grown up asking a cocktail pianist to play a song that his wife liked years ago when they first met. The lyrics have the imagery that could have been in a song from 40 years earlier, such as the opening lines: "When the moon lays his head on a pillow/And the stars settle down for a rest/Just do me one small favor, I beg you/Please play me my baby's request". In the bridges the singer tells the band that although his wife knows the melody, the band knows it even better so if they play the song he and his wife can go to bed with their memories.

== Reception ==
George Harrison visited the recording studio while the band was recording "Baby's Request" and said "Oh, that's nice. I like that." Reviewing the single, NME critics Roy Carr and Tony Tyler called it "an interesting example of the way McCartney has totally mastered the style of Hoagy Carmichael", saying that it is a curiosity that is "worth at least one listen." Music journalist Andrew Wild called it a "very smooth jazz-pop". Knight-Ridder critic Christine Arnold described it as "an affectionate McCartney sendup of old-style sentimental songs." Kansas City Times critic Arthur Brisbane said that McCartney "very nearly [got] away with" playing Cole Porter. Tulsa World critic Vern Stefanic said that the song was "delightful", describing it as a "wonderful, bluesy piano bar tune that might appear out-of-place and strange to younger listeners."

Something Else! critic S. Victor Aaron said that "Paul McCartney’s done much worse when he’s done songs in the style of his parents’ music" but regarded using the synthesizer instead of an actual trombone "unforgivable". Fellow Something Else! critic Nick DeRiso called it a "prosaic swing-band pastiche' and said it sounded "hopelessly, devastatingly old-timey." Melody Maker critic Ian Birch reviewed the single release saying that the song "is another of those doe-eyed McCartney pastiches, a nightclub soft-shoe shuffle with staggeringly inane lyrics." Argus Leader entertainment editor Marshall Fine considered it a "throwaway".

== Music video ==
Keith McMillan shot a promotional video for "Baby's Request" on 15 June 1979 at Camber Sands in East Sussex, England. The set was designed as an army encampment, with jeeps armored vehicles and tents. The band wore World War II uniforms and mimed the song as if they were 1940s stars performing to entertain soldiers fighting in the desert in North Africa. In the video, Linda McCartney, rather than Paul, is seen playing the Bill Black double bass.

== Personnel ==
According to The Paul McCartney Project:

- Paul McCartney – lead and backing vocals, double-bass, Moog synthesizer
- Linda McCartney – backing vocals
- Denny Laine – backing vocals, piano
- Laurence Juber – electric guitar
- Steve Holley – drums
