= Wings UK Tour 1979 =

1979 concert tour by Wings

- Continental tour by Wings
- Location: United Kingdom
- Associated album: Back to the Egg
- Start date: 23 November 1979
- End date: 29 December 1979
- Legs: 1
- No. of shows: 20

Wings concert chronology
- Wings Over the World tour (1975–76); Wings UK Tour 1979 (1979)

On 23 November 1979, Paul McCartney's band Wings began a 19-date concert tour of the United Kingdom to promote their recent album, Back to the Egg.

== History ==
Wings' lineup for the tour was Paul and Linda McCartney, Denny Laine, Laurence Juber and Steve Holley, together with a brass section from the previous tour led by Howie Casey.

Following the main part of the tour, Wings teamed up with an all-star cast of musicians and took the name Rockestra to perform a series of Concerts for the People of Kampuchea at the Hammersmith Odeon in London.

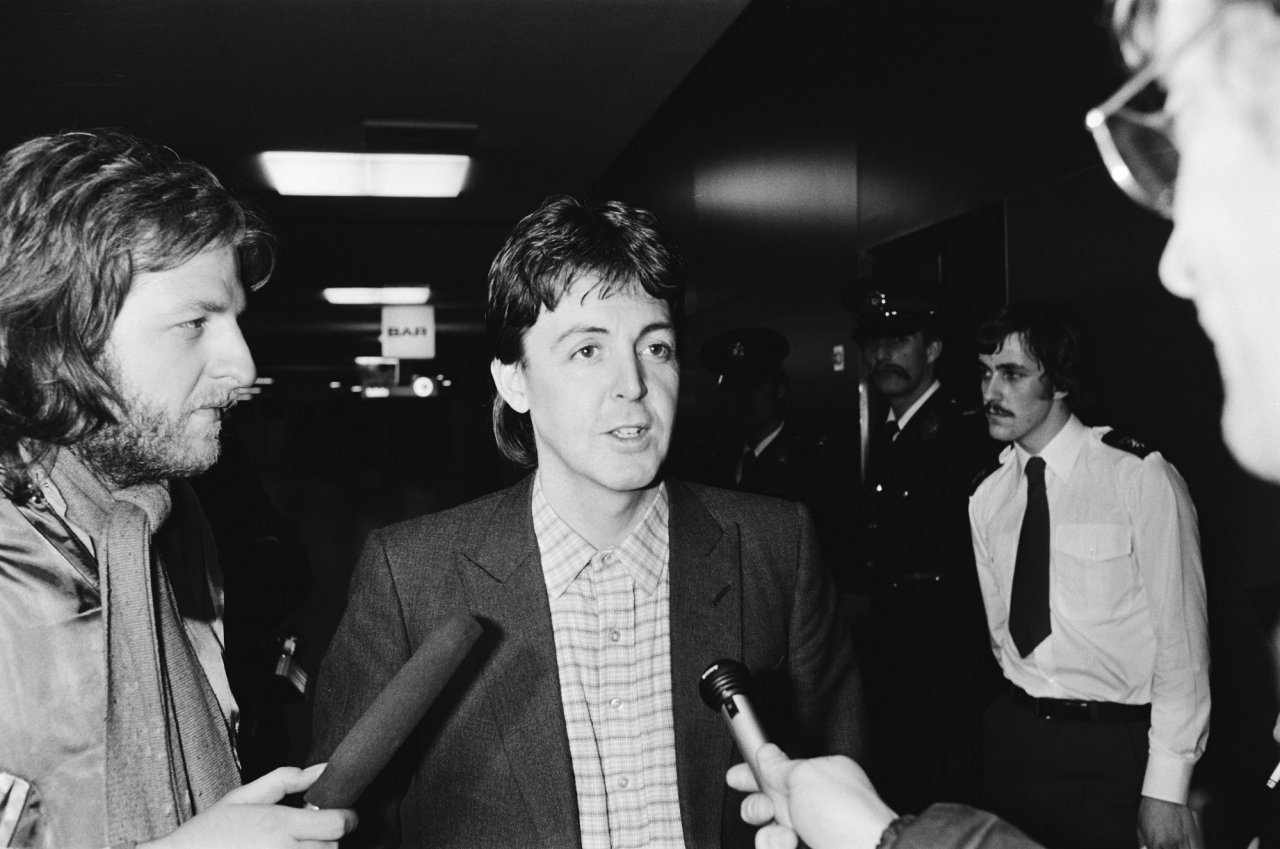
Paul McCartney after being deported from Japan, January 1980

It was originally to have been the first leg of a planned world tour, with further stops scheduled in Japan, Europe and America. However, it became Wings' final concert tour, after McCartney's marijuana arrest in Tokyo the following January.

== Releases ==
A recording of "Coming Up" from Glasgow on 17 December 1979 of the tour was released on the single in April 1980 taking the A-side in the United States and becoming a number one hit. The Glasgow show itself was widely bootlegged under the title 'Last Flight'.

Six songs of the Hammersmith Odeon performance, three by Wings and three by Rockestra, were released on a Concerts for the People of Kampuchea live album.

With the beginning of Paul McCartney Archive Collection album reissues in 2010 more songs from a Glasgow show have been released. Band on the Run reissue received "No Words" and "Band on the Run" as pre-order bonus tracks, McCartney included "Every Night", "Maybe I'm Amazed" and "Hot as Sun" and McCartney II included "Coming Up" as bonus tracks.

== Set list ==
Per Paul McCartney's website:

1. "Got to Get You into My Life"
2. "Getting Closer"
3. "Every Night"
4. "Again and Again and Again"
5. "I've Had Enough"
6. "No Words"
7. "Cook of the House"
8. "Old Siam, Sir"
9. "Maybe I'm Amazed"
10. "The Fool on the Hill"
11. "Hot As Sun"
12. "Spin It On"
13. "Twenty Flight Rock"
14. "Go Now"
15. "Arrow Through Me"
16. "Coming Up"
17. "Goodnight Tonight"
18. "Wonderful Christmastime"
19. "Yesterday"
20. "Mull of Kintyre"
21. "Band on the Run"

== Tour dates ==
After a live rehearsal at the Liverpool Royal Court attended by pupils of Liverpool Institute, McCartney's alma mater and of John Lennon's former school, Quarry Bank.

Date	City	Country	Venue
United Kingdom
23 November 1979	Liverpool	England	Royal Court Theatre
24 November 1979	Liverpool	England	Royal Court Theatre
25 November 1979	Liverpool	England	Royal Court Theatre
26 November 1979	Liverpool	England	Royal Court Theatre
28 November 1979	Manchester	England	Manchester Apollo
29 November 1979	Manchester	England	Manchester Apollo
1 December 1979	Southampton	England	Gaumont Theatre
2 December 1979	Brighton	England	Brighton Centre
3 December 1979	London	England	Lewisham Odeon
5 December 1979	London	England	Rainbow Theatre
7 December 1979	London	England	Wembley Arena
8 December 1979	London	England	Wembley Arena
9 December 1979	London	England	Wembley Arena
10 December 1979	London	England	Wembley Arena
12 December 1979	Birmingham	England	Birmingham Odeon
14 December 1979	Newcastle upon Tyne	England	Newcastle City Hall
15 December 1979	Edinburgh	Scotland	Edinburgh Odeon
16 December 1979	Glasgow	Scotland	The Apollo
17 December 1979	Glasgow	Scotland	The Apollo
29 December 1979^{[A]}	London	England	Hammersmith Odeon

Festivals and other miscellaneous performances
^{A} This concert was a part of "Concerts for the People of Kampuchea"
