= Concert for Kampuchea =

1980 film by Keith Macmillan

The Concert for Kampuchea
- Unofficial DVD cover
- Directed by: Keith Macmillan
- Produced by: Bob Mercer
- Starring: Wings; The Clash; Elvis Costello; The Pretenders; Ian Dury; Rockpile feat. Robert Plant; Queen; The Specials; The Who
- Cinematography: Anthony Richmond
- Distributed by: Almi Cinema 5
- Release date: August 1980
- Running time: 90 minutes
- Language: English

The Concert for Kampuchea (subtitled "Rock for Kampuchea") is a musical film from the best of the Concerts for the People of Kampuchea. The film was directed by Keith McMillan and was four nights of concerts in Hammersmith Odeon to raise money for Cambodia. The event was organized by Paul McCartney and Kurt Waldheim (who was then Secretary-General of the UN), and it involved well-established artists such as McCartney, the Who and Queen as well as younger punk and new wave acts like the Clash and the Pretenders. The film finishes with the presentation of Wings' Rockestra (more of 25 musicians playing together). Filmed in 1979, Concert for Kampuchea did not receive American theatrical distribution until it was picked up by Miramax in 1988.

The concert was also recorded and released as a double LP, 8-track cartridge tape and cassette tape in 1979. It has yet to be released in a digital format.

== Track listing ==
- Opening commentary
- Performed by Queen:

"Now I'm Here"
"Crazy Little Thing Called Love"

- Performed by Matumbi:

"Guide Us Jah (In Your Own Way)"

- Performed by The Clash:

"Armagideon Time"

- Performed by The Pretenders:

"The Wait"

- Performed by Wings:

"Got To Get You Into My Life"
"Getting Closer"
"Every Night"
"Arrow Through Me"
"Coming Up"

- Performed by The Specials:

"Monkey Man"

- Performed by Elvis Costello & The Attractions:

"The Imposter"

- Performed by Rockpile

"Crawling From The Wreckage"
"Little Sister" (with Robert Plant)

- Performed by Ian Dury & The Blockheads:

"Sweet Gene Vincent"
"Hit Me With Your Rhythm Stick"

- Performed by The Who:

"Sister Disco"
"Behind Blue Eyes"
"See Me, Feel Me"

- Performed by Billy Connolly:

"Introduction to the Rockestra"

- Performed by Rockestra:

"Lucille"
"Let It Be"
"Rockestra Theme"

== See also ==
- Concerts for the People of Kampuchea, the concerts and set lists.
- Concerts for the People of Kampuchea, the album and the EP about the concerts.
