= Daytime Nighttime Suffering =

Single by Wings
- A-side: "Goodnight Tonight"
- Released: 23 March 1979
- Recorded: 15 January 1979
- Studio: Replica Studio, London
- Genre: Rock, pop
- Length: 3:19
- Label: Parlophone/EMI
- Songwriter: Paul McCartney
- Producers: Paul McCartney; Chris Thomas

Wings singles chronology
"London Town" (1978)	"Goodnight Tonight" / "Daytime Nighttime Suffering" (1979)	"Old Siam, Sir" (1979)

"Daytime Nighttime Suffering" is a song written by Paul McCartney and recorded by Wings. It was the B-side to the 1979 single "Goodnight Tonight," which was a top-five hit in both the UK and US. It was released on CD in 1993 as part of the release of The Paul McCartney Collection, and can be found as a bonus track on the album Back to the Egg. It is also included on the CD collection Wingspan: Hits and History. It was also included on The 7" Singles Box in 2022.

== Composition ==
According to the book Band on the Run: A History of Paul McCartney & Wings by Garry McGee, the writing of the song was as follows:

"When Wings was recording Back to the Egg, Paul had announced to the other band members that if they could come up with a good enough song, it would be recorded and put on B-side of the single. Such a generous gesture opened financial doors for the other band members, as the song could earn a small fortune as the flip side of a hit single. Each member—including Linda—spent the weekend trying to compose the song, but when Monday morning rolled around, Paul announced that he had written 'the one.'

"Daytime Nighttime Suffering" was released as the B-side of "Goodnight Tonight." The single reached the top ten on both sides of the Atlantic in the spring of 1979, also earning gold certification in the United States.

== Recording and subsequent history ==
The song was recorded January 1979 as part of the album sessions. In contrast to the quick composition of the song, the mixing required 49 attempts. The McCartneys' son James, who was a baby at the time, can be heard crying about two minutes into the song.

McCartney cited the song as "one of my current favourites" in a 1984 interview with Oprah Winfrey, and he has mentioned it as a favourite in subsequent interviews as well. Linda McCartney mentioned it as a favourite as well. Despite this, McCartney has never performed the song live, although it was selected for inclusion on the "History" disc of the Wingspan: Hits and History collection.

== Personnel ==
According to Luca Perasi:

- Paul McCartney – vocals, backing vocals, bass, autoharp
- Linda McCartney – backing vocals, RMI electric piano
- Denny Laine – backing vocals, electric guitar
- Laurence Juber – electric guitar
- Steve Holley – drums, tambourine (?)
- James McCartney – crying
