= Solo Flight (Laurence Juber album) =

Studio album by Laurence Juber
- Released: July 1990
- Genre: Folk, rock
- Length: 42:44
- Label: Beachwood
- Producer: Laurence Juber

Laurence Juber chronology
Standard Time (1982)	Solo Flight (1990)	Naked Guitar (1993)

Professional ratings
Review scores
Source	Rating
Allmusic	4/5 stars

Solo Flight is the second album by former Wings guitarist Laurence Juber, released in 1990.

== Track listing ==
All songs by Laurence Juber

1. "A Bit of a George" - 2:40
2. "Breath of Air" - 2:50
3. "The Stepney Two Step" - 2:13
4. "Tombeau (Elegy)" - 1:54
5. "I'll Think of You & Smile" - 2:58
6. "Open for Business" - 3:00
7. "Solo Flight" - 2:13
8. "In Your Arms" - 3:41
9. "Ferdinand's Lute" - 2:47
10. "Elevations of the Heart" - 3:22
11. "This Process (Is a Process)" - 3:52
12. "Joanna" - 2:43
13. "Barnet Fair" - 5:27
14. "Slow Dance" - 3:04

== Personnel ==
- Laurence Juber – guitar

Production notes:

- Laurence Juber – producer
- James Lee Stanley – executive producer
- Avi Kipper – engineer
- Joe Gastwirt – mastering
- Brian Aris – photography
