= Concerts for the People of Kampuchea (album) =

Live album by Various Artists
- Released: 30 March 1981
- Recorded: 26–29 December 1979
- Venue: Hammersmith Odeon, London
- Genre: Rock
- Length: 79:30
- Label: Atlantic
- Producer: Chris Thomas

Professional ratings
Review scores
Source	Rating
AllMusic	3/5 stars
Robert Christgau	B+

Concerts for the People of Kampuchea is a double album credited to Various Artists and released in March 1981. It contains live performances by Wings, the Who, Queen, Elvis Costello, Pretenders, the Clash, the Specials and other artists from the Concerts for the People of Kampuchea, held at London's Hammersmith Odeon in December 1979 to raise money for the victims of war-torn Cambodia. The event was organised by Paul McCartney and Kurt Waldheim.

== History ==
The album starts with four songs from the Who (culled from a 3-hour set list) and finishes with three songs from Wings and three from the all-star line-up called Rockestra. A selection of the best performances from the concerts was compiled and released as a film, Concert for Kampuchea.

Rockestra was a Paul McCartney-led supergroup of at least thirty English rockers. The credited list appears at the bottom of the back cover of the LP. The name was first given to an assemblage of famous rock stars that were brought together by McCartney for the final Wings album, 1979's Back to the Egg. The supergroup – which consisted of Wings, John Paul Jones and John Bonham of Led Zeppelin, David Gilmour from Pink Floyd, Ronnie Lane of the Faces, Kenney Jones and Pete Townshend of the Who, and Hank Marvin of the Shadows – recorded two McCartney compositions, the instrumental "Rockestra Theme" and "So Glad to See You Here".

Then, McCartney and Kurt Waldheim re-assembled Rockestra for a series of benefit concerts for the people of Cambodia (also known as Kampuchea), suffering from the reign of Pol Pot. This time, Rockestra consisted of, among others, Wings, John Paul Jones, Bonham, Robert Plant, Rockpile, James Honeyman-Scott and Townshend. Hank Marvin was not available and Gilmour for tax reasons had to decline, as he was with the rest of Pink Floyd in Los Angeles, California, where they were in the midst of rehearsing for an upcoming concert tour for the just released Pink Floyd album The Wall.

Despite the all-star lineup and charting within the Top 40, it remains one of McCartney's few projects to never receive a remaster or a CD release.

== Album track listing ==
1. "Baba O'Riley" (Pete Townshend) – 5:12
2. "Sister Disco" (Townshend) – 5:16
3. "Behind Blue Eyes" (Townshend) – 3:46
4. "See Me, Feel Me" (Townshend) – 5:49
  - Tracks 1–4 performed by the Who
5. "The Wait" (Chrissie Hynde, Pete Farndon) – 3:28
6. "Precious" (Hynde) – 3:23
7. "Tattooed Love Boys" (Hynde) – 3:18
  - Tracks 5–7 performed by Pretenders
8. "The Imposter" (Elvis Costello) – 2:10
  - Performed by Elvis Costello & the Attractions
9. "Crawling from the Wreckage" (Graham Parker) – 3:02
  - Performed by Rockpile
10. "Little Sister" (Doc Pomus, Mort Shuman) – 3:33
  - Performed by Rockpile with Robert Plant
11. "Now I'm Here" (Brian May) – 6:49
  - Performed by Queen
12. "Armagideon Time" (Bennett) – 4:15
  - Performed by the Clash
13. "Hit Me with Your Rhythm Stick" (Ian Dury, Chaz Jankel) – 4:30
  - Performed by Ian Dury & the Blockheads
14. "Monkey Man" (Toots Hibbert) – 2:26
  - Performed by the Specials
15. "Got to Get You into My Life" (John Lennon, Paul McCartney) – 2:57
16. "Every Night" (McCartney) – 4:17
17. "Coming Up" (McCartney) – 4:08
  - Tracks 15–17 performed by Wings
18. "Lucille" (Albert Collins, Richard Penniman) – 3:03
19. "Let It Be" (Lennon, McCartney) – 4:12
20. "Rockestra Theme" (McCartney) – 2:30
  - Tracks 18–20 performed by Rockestra

== Rockestra's personnel ==
- Piano: Paul McCartney
- Keyboards: Linda McCartney, Tony Ashton, Gary Brooker
- Guitars: Denny Laine, Laurence Juber, James Honeyman-Scott, Dave Edmunds, Billy Bremner, Pete Townshend
- Bass: Paul McCartney, Bruce Thomas, Ronnie Lane, John Paul Jones
- Drums, percussion: Steve Holley, Kenney Jones, Tony Carr, Morris Pert, Speedy Acquaye, John Bonham
- Horns: Howie Casey, Steve Howard, Thaddeus Richard, Tony Dorsey
- Vocals: Paul McCartney, Linda McCartney, John Paul Jones, Ronnie Lane, Bruce Thomas, Robert Plant

== Charts ==
Album

Chart (1981)	Position
US Billboard 200	36

Album track

Year	Title	Chart	Position
1981	Little Sister	US Billboard Top Tracks	8
