= Goodnight Tonight =

1979 single by Wings

Single by Wings
- B-side: "Daytime Nighttime Suffering"
- Released: 23 March 1979
- Recorded: 6 February 1978, 22 January – 9 February 1979
- Studio: Abbey Road, London; Replica, London
- Genre: Dance; disco; pop
- Length: 4:19 (7"); 7:14 (12")
- Label: Parlophone; Columbia
- Songwriter: Paul McCartney
- Producer: Paul McCartney

Wings singles chronology
"London Town" (1978)	"Goodnight Tonight" (1979)	"Old Siam, Sir" (1979)

"Goodnight Tonight" is a song by the British–American rock band Wings. Written and produced by Paul McCartney, it was released as a non-album single on 23 March 1979 by Parlophone in the UK and Columbia Records in the US. McCartney recorded the backing track himself in February 1979 before completing it with Wings the following year during the sessions for Back to the Egg. It is a dance, disco and pop song, with elements of rock, flamenco and Latin, that is led by a syncopated bass line. In the lyrics, the narrator encourages his partner to stay with him and not say goodnight.

The song was originally over seven minutes in length before being edited for release as a 7" single; the full version appeared as a 12" single. Despite mixed reviews, the song was a commercial success, reaching the top five in the US, UK, Canada and France. A music video was made, depicting the band as a 1930s lounge act intercut with them in modern-day attire. Wings performed it live during their 1979 UK tour. The song has since appeared on several McCartney compilation albums.

== Background and recording ==
Paul McCartney wrote "Goodnight Tonight" after attending a disco. He later said: "I was basically just trying to write a dance record. I would call it a disco record because I wrote it after going to a disco one night. I had listened to everything that night that was going down and went away with that kind of thing in my mind, and I happened to write that particular tune. He later said it was like a disco version of the Rolling Stones' "Let's Spend the Night Together" (1967), "only put more genteelly".

McCartney recorded a demo of the song by himself at Abbey Road Studios in London on 6 February 1978, ten days after the album London Town was mastered. Starting with a drum machine, he overdubbed a guide vocal, bass guitar, real drums, acoustic and electric guitars, handclaps and organ; the resulting take ran over seven minutes long. The song was then shelved for over a year.

Needing a single for Wings to accompany the Back to the Egg album, McCartney took out the track and brought it into the studio, where the full Wings line-up completed it. Overdubs were recorded at Replica Studio, an Abbey Road reproduction located in the basement of MPL's offices in Soho, London, between 22 January and 9 February 1979. Denny Laine and Laurence Juber added electric guitars, mirroring Paul's parts, and Steve Holley added percussion, while the whole band sang in the chorus. McCartney sang using a vocoder to make his voice sound robotic and Juber played flamenco-style flourishes on Laine's Ovation Adamas acoustic guitar.

"Goodnight Tonight", "Daytime Nighttime Suffering" and the rest of the Back to the Egg album were mixed between early February and March. Since the track was over seven minutes long, McCartney trimmed it down to 4:19 for release as a single, with the full version appearing as a 12-inch single. The song was mastered by Malcolm Davies at Pye Studios in London. According to McCartney, the record label was resistant when they were presented with the song. He said to an interviewer: "The record company said, 'It won't be a good single, [you] probably shouldn't release it. So we did." In a contemporary interview with Rolling Stone, McCartney said that "Goodnight Tonight" was originally intended to be the B-side and "Daytime Nighttime Suffering" as the A-side, before deciding to flip them.

== Composition ==
"Goodnight Tonight" is a dance, disco and pop song, with elements of rock, flamenco and Latin. (Note: Dance and Latin; disco, Latin and flamenco; pop; pop, disco and flamenco; pop, rock and disco.) According to music professor Vincent Benitez Jr., the song's key is E major, although the sheet music published by MPL states the song is in F major. Its song structure is traditional verse–chorus, with an intro and instrumenal breaks. Led by a syncopated bass line, authors Allan Kozinn and Adrian Sinclair write that the track's chord sequence contains many sevenths and ninths that "create a mildly dissonant feel". In the lyrics, the narrator asks his partner not to leave by saying "goodnight tonight".

== Release ==
"Goodnight Tonight", with "Daytime Nighttime Suffering" as the B-side, was released as a non-album single worldwide through Parlophone and Columbia Records on 23 March 1979; (Note: The US release is debated. Garry McGee, Tom Doyle and Keith Badman list it as 15 March; the book Wings: The Story of a Band on the Run (2025) lists 16 March, and Luca Perasi lists 19 March.) it was McCartney's first single in seven months and his first single with Columbia. The 7" single contained the edited version, while the 12" single featured the full-length track. (Note: According to McGee and Badman, the 12" single was released on in the US on 26 March, with the UK release following on 3 April.) Both labels wanted both songs on Back to the Egg, but McCartney refused, stating the song did not fit the album's punk/new wave sound, and he had been criticised in the press for releasing too many singles from London Town. When Back to the Egg, released in May (US) and June (UK), performed below the label's expectations, one executive attributed it to not including "Goodnight Tonight" on the album, after that album's US singles "Getting Closer" and "Arrow Through Me" failed to break the US top 20.

For the single's picture sleeve, shot in March 1979, the band dressed as a 1930s lounge band, with the men wearing tuxedos and Linda McCartney wearing a purple dress and a hand fan. They recreated this look for the song's music video, which was shot on 3 April 1979 at the Hammersmith Palais in London and was directed by Keith McMillan. The 1930s look was intercut with the band in modern-day attire. The video aired in the UK on Top of the Pops and The Kenny Everett Video Show, and in the US on The Midnight Special, among others.

"Goodnight Tonight" was a commercial success, reaching number five on both the Billboard Hot 100 and the UK Singles Chart, spending 16 and 10 weeks on the charts, respectively. The single was certified Gold by the Recording Industry Association of America (RIAA) for sales of over one million copies. Elsewhere, the single reached number 2 in Canada and France, number 6 in New Zealand and number 9 in Norway. Rodriguez believed the song alienated McCartney's rock audience, preventing it from charting higher.

=== Live performances ===
Wings performed "Goodnight Tonight" throughout their 1979 UK tour, during which a robot named Robbo accompanied the band on stage. Since Wings' dissolution in 1981, McCartney has only performed the song once, in London on 8 September 2012 during a show with Africa Express.

=== Later releases ===
"Goodnight Tonight" was later included on the McCartney compilations All the Best! (1987), Wingspan: Hits and History (2001), Pure McCartney (2016), The 7" Singles Box (2022) and Wings (2025). The 7" version was released as a bonus track on the 1993 remastered CD of McCartney II, as part of The Paul McCartney Collection. The 12" version appears on the 2007 digital iTunes re-issue of Back to the Egg.

== Reception ==
The single was dismissed by David Hepworth of Sounds magazine as "dismal frippery" and by Melody Maker's Ian Birch, who called the song "a non-existent throwaway while the 'disco effects' have zero robustness or sensuality". Birch also thought McCartney and Wings were chasing trends. In the Daily Express, Anne Nightingale said that McCartney and Wings "have turned their latest record into a slowish smooched disco number, most of which is taken up with Paul repeating the words 'don't say it'." In NME, Bob Edmands commented how the song's varying instrumentation amounts to the absence of a tune, although he called it McCartney's best piece of music since London Town.

Cash Box said it was an unusual song for McCartney in that the "percussion undercurrents and muscular bass playing is likely to receive disco play" and said that the "acoustic and electric guitars offer interesting flourishes." Record World called it "a semi-serious disco tune featuring every conceivable studio technique and a hook you can boogie (or sing) along with." More positively, Record Mirror's Kelly Pike believed the song harkened back to Band on the Run and said it was "better [and] less blatantly commercial than [Wings'] recent releases. McCartney's former songwriting partner John Lennon commented that he did not care for the song, but enjoyed the bass guitar, as did Rolling Stone, who called the bass line "crazy and inventive". Smash Hits said the song was "a cosy shuffle".

In a retrospective review for AllMusic, Donald A. Guarisco said that "Goodnight Tonight" is "a good example of Paul McCartney's ability to incorporate the sounds of the day into his usual blend of pop and rock elements without ever losing his unique musical personality." Comparing it positively to the contemporary music of the Kinks and the Rolling Stones, Guarisco said "Goodnight Tonight" aged well in later decades due to its "solid hooks and adventurous arrangement". Author Ted Montgomery later called the single one of McCartney's finest "and most unusual". In 2020, Rolling Stone ranked it McCartney's 28th best solo song.

== Personnel ==
According to Luca Perasi:

- Paul McCartney – lead vocals, backing vocals, acoustic and electric lead guitars, vocoder, bass, drums, percussion, keyboards
- Linda McCartney – backing vocals, tambourine (?)
- Denny Laine – backing vocals, lead guitar
- Laurence Juber – backing vocals, acoustic guitar, lead guitar
- Steve Holley – backing vocals, clay drums percussion, tambourine (?)

Technical

- Paul McCartney – producer
- Geoff Emerick – engineer

== Charts ==
=== Weekly charts ===
Chart (1979)	Peak position
Australia (Kent Music Report)	6
Belgium (Ultratop 50 Flanders)	24
Canada Top Singles (RPM)	2
Canada Adult Contemporary (RPM)	1
Germany (GfK)	34
Ireland (IRMA)	9
Italy (FIMI)	4
Japan (Oricon)	77
Netherlands (Single Top 100)	24
New Zealand (Recorded Music NZ)	6
Norway (VG-lista)	9
South Africa (Springbok)	15
UK Singles (Official Charts)	5
US Billboard Hot 100	5
US Adult Contemporary (Billboard)	30
US Cash Box Top 100	4

=== Year-end charts ===
Chart (1979)	Rank
Australia (Kent Music Report)	57
Canada Top 200 Singles (RPM)	6
UK Top Singles (OCC)	73
US Billboard Hot 100	52

== Certifications ==
Region	Certification	Certified units/sales
Canada (Music Canada)	Gold	75,000^{^}
United Kingdom (BPI)	Silver	250,000^{^}
United States (RIAA)	Gold	1,000,000^{^}
^{^} Shipments figures based on certification alone.
