= Rockestra Theme =

Single by Wings

from the album Back to the Egg
- B-side: "Old Siam, Sir"
- Released: 1979 (France)
- Recorded: 3 October 1978
- Studio: Abbey Road Studios, London
- Genre: Hard rock; rock and roll; instrumental rock
- Length: 2:37
- Label: Parlophone/EMI (Europe only)
- Songwriter: Paul McCartney
- Producers: Paul McCartney; Chris Thomas

Wings singles chronology
"Arrow Through Me" (1979)	"Rockestra Theme" (1979)	"Coming Up (Live at Glasgow)" (1980)

"Rockestra Theme" is a song by Wings from their final studio album Back to the Egg. The song was released as a single in France and Netherlands.

== Composition and recording ==
The earliest known demo recording of "Rockestra Theme" dates to mid-1974.

"Rockestra Theme" was recorded on 3 October 1978 at Abbey Road Studios by an all-star collection of musicians dubbed "Rockestra", although the song is technically credited to Wings. It was recorded as part of Wings' 1979 album Back to the Egg and released as a single in France.

=== Personnel ===
Musicians who performed on both this song and on "So Glad To See You Here" included: Denny Laine, Laurence Juber, David Gilmour, Hank Marvin, Pete Townshend (guitars), Steve Holley, John Bonham, Kenney Jones (drums), Paul McCartney (piano, bass), John Paul Jones, Ronnie Lane, Bruce Thomas (basses), Gary Brooker, Linda McCartney, Tony Ashton (keyboards), Speedy Acquaye, Tony Carr, Ray Cooper, Morris Pert (percussion), Howie Casey, Tony Dorsey, Steve Howard, Thaddeus Richard (horns).

One person taken out of the Rockestra supergroup was Jeff Beck. After being asked by McCartney to participate, Beck requested to be able to have veto power over his own guitar contributions. McCartney subsequently withdrew Beck's invitation.

In a 2001 interview on VH1, McCartney said Keith Moon was to have taken part in "Rockestra" but died one month before the recording sessions took place. Kenney Jones, who replaced Moon on drums within the Who, appeared instead. Wings' drummer Steve Holley described the recording session as "daunting".

== Personnel ==
- Paul McCartney – vocals, bass, piano
- Linda McCartney – keyboards, backing vocals
- Denny Laine – electric guitar
- Laurence Juber – electric guitar
- Steve Holley – drums
- David Gilmour – electric guitar
- Pete Townshend – electric guitar
- Hank Marvin – electric guitar
- Tony Ashton – keyboards
- Gary Brooker – piano
- Bruce Thomas – bass
- Ronnie Lane – bass
- John Paul Jones – bass, piano
- John Bonham – drums
- Kenney Jones – drums
- Ray Cooper – percussion
- Tony Carr – percussion
- Morris Pert – percussion
- Howie Casey – horns
- Tony Dorsey – horns
- Steve Howard – horns
- Thaddeus Richard – horns
- Speedy Acquaye – percussion

== Live ==
The song was performed again at the Concerts for the People of Kampuchea and released on the album and EP of the same name. This was a series of concerts featuring Queen, the Clash, the Pretenders, the Who, Elvis Costello, Wings, and many more artists which took place at the Hammersmith Odeon in London, England during December 1979 to raise money for the victims of war-torn Cambodia. The event was organized by McCartney and Kurt Waldheim, and it involved older artists such as McCartney and the Who as well as younger new wave acts like the Clash and the Pretenders. The last of the concerts was the last concert of Wings.

Most of the Rockestra wore silver suits for this performance. On the Concerts for Kampuchea home video, McCartney can be heard making a comment about Townshend before playing the song, making reference to Townshend being a "poof" (gay in British slang). "Thank you, Peter. Only lousy sod who wouldn't wear the silver suit. Cuz he's a poof." Townshend made comment about it in several interviews following the performance. Juber can be seen walking up behind Townshend after McCartney's comment, and placing a silver top hat on his head. Townshend quickly grabs the hat and flings it into the audience. James Honeyman-Scott and Dave Edmunds filled in for Marvin and Gilmour as the former was in New Zealand while the latter was in Los Angeles, California as a tax exile with the rest of Pink Floyd rehearsing for the concerts in support of the then newly released album, The Wall.

== Aftermath ==
"Rockestra Theme" won the 1980 Grammy Award for Best Rock Instrumental Performance. In France it was used as the opening theme of Chlorophylle, a pop-rock programme on the radio station Europe 1.
