= Spin It On =

"Spin it On"
- US single

Single by Wings

from the album Back to the Egg
- A-side: "Getting Closer" (U.S.) "Old Siam, Sir" (worldwide, except U.S.)
- Released: 1 June 1979 (UK); 5 June 1979 (US)
- Recorded: 23 July 1978
- Studio: Spirit of Ranachan, Campbeltown
- Length: 2:12
- Label: Parlophone (UK); Columbia (US)
- Songwriter: Paul McCartney
- Producers: Paul McCartney; Chris Thomas

Wings singles chronology
"Goodnight Tonight" (1979)	"Spin it On" (1979)	"Getting Closer" (1979)

Music video
- "Spin It On" on YouTube

"Spin It On" is a song written by Paul McCartney that was first released on Wings' 1979 album Back to the Egg. It was also issued as the B-side of the singles "Getting Closer" in the US and "Old Siam, Sir" in the UK. The song was later released on The 7" Singles Box in 2022.

== Writing and recording ==
McCartney wrote "Spin It On" on the morning of 23 July 1978 and recorded it with Wings that same day. According to McCartney, when he played the song initially for the band most of them thought he was joking about recording it because it sounded "daft" on one guitar, but McCartney felt he hadn't recorded a fast song in some time and wanted to do so. Wings' drummer Steve Holley though remembers liking the song right away, perhaps because he was younger than the others and more appreciative of the punk attitude of the song.

As with other songs on Back to the Egg, the recording was made at the Spirit of Ranachan Studio that was set up on Low Ranachan Farm in Campbeltown, Scotland. The song was recorded with Paul McCartney on bass, Denny Laine and Laurence Juber on electric guitars, and Holley playing drums and providing what he described as "double-speed. sixteen-stroke" rapid-fire fills. After the instruments were recorded, Paul McCartney added his double-tracked lead vocal and Laine and Linda McCartney recorded the backing vocals. Juber then overdubbed his guitar solos using a Fender Stratocaster. Juber said he came up with the solo while sitting alone with Paul McCartney in the control room and playing licks for him. He said that it was a challenge that pushed him out of his comfort zone, but that he liked being pushed that way.

Mixing was done in late October 1978. The master mix was completed on 13 February.

== Music and lyrics ==
"Spin It On" reflects the influence of punk rock and new wave music and uses a fast tempo. Something Else! critic S. Victor Aaron also noted that it also sounds like a speeded up version of the types of song McCartney sang in his "Mersey Beat days", i.e., the early 1960s before the Beatles got their recording contract. The song is built primarily on 2 power chords in the keys of A and E. The power chords alternate with the note G, so the structure of the song cycles the A power chord, then G, then the E power chord and then a G. Music critic Nick DeRiso described it as "a galloping, grinding rock track, in many ways unlike anything Paul McCartney and Wings had ever done – if only for its nervy guitar gumption."

The lyrics of the chorus have the singer saying to his lover that they should "spin it on", i.e., have sex, because he has a "whole lotta love" for her. The lyrics of the verses are fairly nonsensical, for example describing the lover going to a fair with her hair in curlers. The first line of the first verse are "Off to the flicks with the piddle in her nicks", meaning "Off to the flicks with urine in her underwear". Another verse has a line "Off to the fields with a missionary zeal for the life/Of the wife of the farmer".

== Reception ==
Ultimate Classic Rock critic Dave Swanson rated it as McCartney's 2nd most underrated song, describing it as "a full throttle, no -frills rocker that never lets up for all of its two minutes of glory" and praising its melody as well as its combination of early rock 'n' roll with "a totally contemporary urgency and drive". Classic Rock History critic John Tabacco also regarded it as one of McCartney's most underrated songs, calling it one of McCartney's fastest songs and praising the energy and close harmonies. Music journalist Andrew Wild called it a "hidden gem", particularly praising Juber's "fluid guitar work". Music professor Vincent Benitez described the song as McCartney-esque whimsy on punk steroids. DeRiso said that the song contains "contains some of the most dramatic and interesting sounds ever issued from [Juber's] instrument. The Press-Enterprise staff called it a "tasty little rocker" reminiscent of John Lennon. Knight-Ridder critic Christine Arnold noted a resemblance to Led Zeppelin and commented on the "incredible bass and thundering drums".

== Music video ==
As with 6 other songs from Back to the Egg, Keith McMillan shot a promotional video for "Spin It On". The video for "Spin It On" was shot on 29 May 1979. The video was shot in the hangar at the Eagle Parachute Club, with the band miming a performance of the song dressing in leather bomber jackets. The video begins with a shot of a spinning airplane propeller, and during the video the band members are sometimes seen spinning around in circles.

== Live performances ==
Wings played "Spin It On" 20 times live as part of the setlist for the Wings UK Tour 1979. McCartney also played it at least once live at a solo concert.

== Personnel ==
According to The Paul McCartney Project:

- Paul McCartney – lead and backing vocals, bass
- Linda McCartney – keyboards
- Denny Laine – electric guitar
- Laurence Juber – electric guitar
- Steve Holley – drums
