= Standard Time (album) =

Studio album by Laurence Juber
- Released: 1982
- Recorded: June 1978, summer 1979
- Studio: Abbey Road Studios, Air Studios London
- Genre: Jazz
- Length: 19:51 (original); 40:50 (reissue)
- Label: Breaking Records
- Producer: Laurence Juber, Ricard Niles

Laurence Juber chronology
Standard Time (1982)	Solo Flight (1990)

Standard Time is the debut album by former Wings guitarist Laurence Juber, released in 1982.

== Overview ==
The album is mostly a collection of covers aside from one track, "Maisie". It's an original song that was recorded with Wings on July 21st, 1978 at Low Ranachan Farm, Campbeltown, Scotland during the Back to the Egg sessions and features Paul McCartney on Rickenbacker bass guitar, Denny Laine and Steve Holley.

"Maisie" would later re-appear in a different version on Juber's 1993 album Naked Guitar as "Maise".

== Release ==
The album was originally released on vinyl and was unavailable digitally until 2014 when it was re-released on CD in expanded form as part of Juber's book Guitar with Wings.

The album was released as standalone digital edition in 2018.

== Track listing ==
=== LP ===
Side one
No.	Title	Writer(s)	Length
1.	"Four Brothers"	Jimmy Giuffre	3:39
2.	"Dinah"	Harry Akst, Sam M. Lewis, Joe Young	3:11
3.	"Maisie"	Laurence Juber	2:12

Side two
No.	Title	Writer(s)	Length
1.	"After You've Gone"	Turner Layton, Henry Creamer	3:24
2.	"Stormy Weather"	Harold Arlen, Ted Koehler	5:11
3.	"The Christmas Song"	Mel Tormé, Robert Wells	2:54

=== Reissue ===
No.	Title	Writer(s)	Length
1.	"You're No Good"	Clint Ballard Jr.	5:09
2.	"Dinah"	Harry Akst, Sam M. Lewis, Joe Young	3:12
3.	"Don't Let Go"	Laurence Juber, Ricard Niles	3:32
4.	"Maisie"	Laurence Juber	2:13
5.	"There Will Never Be Another You"	Harry Warren, Mack Gordon	6:10
6.	"Stormy Weather"	Harold Arlen, Ted Koehler	5:17
7.	"Autumn Leaves"	Joseph Kosma, Johnny Mercer, Jacques Prévert	5:26
8.	"Four Brothers"	Jimmy Giuffre	3:41
9.	"After You've Gone"	Henry Creamer, Turner Layton	3:25
10.	"The Christmas Song"	Mel Tormé, Robert Wells	2:45
Total length:			40:50

== Personnel ==
- Laurence Juber – guitar
- Joy Yates – vocals on "Dinah"
- Paul McCartney – bass on "Maisie"
- Steve Holley – drums on "Maisie"
- Denny Laine – harmonica on "Maisie"
- Paul Hart – piano on "After You've Gone"
- Chris Lawrence – bass on "Stormy Weather"
- Ricard Niles/David Katz – orchestra on "Stormy Weather"

Production notes:

- Laurence Juber – producer
- Richard Niles – producer
- Mike Stavrou – engineer
- Hope Juber – art direction
- LB Studios, inc. - photography
