= Back to the Egg =

Studio album by Wings
- Released: 24 May 1979
- Recorded: 29 June 1978 – February 1979
- Studios: Spirit of Ranachan, Campbeltown; Lympne Castle, Kent; Abbey Road and Replica, London
- Genre: Rock
- Length: 42:01
- Labels: Parlophone (UK); Columbia (US)
- Producers: Paul McCartney; Chris Thomas

Wings chronology
Wings Greatest (1978)	Back to the Egg (1979)	Wings 1971–73 (2018)

Paul McCartney chronology
Wings Greatest (1978)	Back to the Egg (1979)	McCartney II (1980)

Singles from Back to the Egg
- 1. "Old Siam, Sir" Released: 1 June 1979 (UK); 2. "Getting Closer" Released: 5 June 1979; 3. "Arrow Through Me" Released: 14 August 1979; 4. "Getting Closer" / "Baby's Request" Released: 17 August 1979 (UK)

Back to the Egg is the seventh and final studio album by the British-American rock band Wings, released on 24 May 1979 through Columbia Records in North America (their first for the label) and on 8 June through Parlophone in the UK. Co-produced by Chris Thomas, the album reflects band leader Paul McCartney's embracing of contemporary musical trends such as new wave and punk, and marked the arrival of new Wings members Laurence Juber and Steve Holley. Back to the Egg adopts a loose conceptual theme around the idea of a working band, and its creation coincided with a period of considerable activity for the group, which included making a return to touring and work on several television and film projects.

Recording for the album began in June 1978 and lasted for almost a year. The sessions took place at Spirit of Ranachan Studios in Campbeltown, Scotland; Lympne Castle in Kent, London's Abbey Road Studios, and Replica Studio – the last of which McCartney built as an exact replica of Abbey Road's Studio Two when the latter became unavailable. Wings returned to Abbey Road in March 1979 to complete the album, before filming a series of promotional videos in Lympne and elsewhere, for what became the Back to the Egg TV special.

Back to the Egg received unfavourable reviews from the majority of critics, with Rolling Stone magazine deriding it as "the sorriest grab bag of dreck in recent memory". Although the album charted in the top ten around the world and was certified platinum in the United States, it was viewed as a commercial failure relative to previous Wings releases, particularly in light of the generous financial terms under which McCartney had signed with CBS-owned Columbia Records. Of its singles – "Old Siam, Sir", "Getting Closer" and "Arrow Through Me" – only "Getting Closer" made the top 20 in Britain or America. The song "Rockestra Theme", recorded with a cast of guest musicians from bands such as the Who, Led Zeppelin and Pink Floyd, won a Grammy Award for Best Rock Instrumental Performance in 1980.

Wings toured the UK in support of the album, but the planned world tour ended in January 1980, when McCartney was arrested in Japan for possession of marijuana, spending nine days in jail. The group disbanded early the following year after the departure of Laine. Back to the Egg was reissued in 1993, with bonus tracks, and in 2007 for iTunes, with the addition of Wings' 1979 non-album single "Goodnight Tonight", in its extended form.

== Background ==
After the release of the album London Town (1978), Wings band leader Paul McCartney hired two session musicians, drummer Steve Holley and lead guitarist Laurence Juber, to replace former members Joe English and Jimmy McCulloch. With the new line-up – Wings' sixth since its formation in 1971 – McCartney intended to record a raw rock and roll album and return to touring, for the band's first concerts since their successful Wings Over the World tour of 1975–76. McCartney also hoped to realise his longstanding plan of making a film adaptation of the Rupert the Bear cartoon series, for which he owned the commercial rights, and commissioned English playwright Willy Russell to write a feature film starring Wings. (Note: The concept of a Wings film formed the basis of McCartney's poorly received cinematic release Give My Regards to Broad Street (1984). The Rupert project finally came to fruition in 1984 also, condensed into an animated short titled Rupert and the Frog Song, which played in theatres as the support film to Give My Regards to Broad Street.)

Holley and Juber were recruited by Wings co-founder and guitarist Denny Laine, who had appeared as a guest on The David Essex Show in 1977 when Juber was working as a guitarist in the house band. Holley, a neighbour of Laine's, joined Wings in time to appear in the promotional video for London Town's lead single, "With a Little Luck", having turned down a position with Elton John's band. According to Wings biographer Garry McGee, Juber and Holley were each paid a weekly sum less than one-fifth of that paid to McCartney, his wife Linda (the band's keyboard player) and Laine.

For the new album, Back to the Egg, McCartney collaborated in the studio with producer Chris Thomas, with whom he had begun working on the audio for two films documenting Wings' last world tour: Wings Over the World, a television documentary, and the cinema release Rockshow (1980). This was the first time Wings recorded with an outside producer since their 1973 single "Live and Let Die", which George Martin had produced. After working with the Pretenders and the Sex Pistols, Thomas brought a punk rock and new wave influence to Wings' sound, matching McCartney's desire to reflect contemporary musical trends.

== Songs ==
The new wave thing was happening and ... I sort of realized, "Well, so what's wrong with us doing an uptempo [album]?" ... Back to the Egg was influenced just as what I had wanted to do at the time, the direction I felt I hadn't been in for a while ...

— Paul McCartney, on his musical influences while making the album

Although London Town had featured a significant level of contribution from Laine as a songwriter, all but one of the songs on Back to the Egg are credited to McCartney alone. The album was originally planned around a loose conceptual theme, about which authors Chip Madinger and Mark Easter write in their book Eight Arms to Hold You: "The idea was to have a theme of a working band, getting back on the road ... or 'back to the egg' (or protective shell) of touring." In the original LP format, the two album sides were labelled with the egg-related titles "Sunny Side Up" and "Over Easy".

=== "Sunny Side Up" ===
The album's opening song is "Reception", an instrumental, in which McCartney attempted to capture the effect of turning a radio dial and finding "about four stations at once". The track features a guitar-controlled synthesizer (played by Juber) over a funk-inspired bassline, and spoken voices, including a reading of part of "The Poodle and the Pug", from Vivian Ellis's opera Big Ben (1946). A brief segment from the track "The Broadcast", which appears later on Back to the Egg, is previewed in this opening piece. The next three songs – "Getting Closer", "We're Open Tonight" and "Spin It On" – adhere to the proposed album-wide concept. Writing in Melody Maker in June 1979, Mark Williams interpreted "Reception" as representing a radio being tuned in a car, whereby "the occupant is on his way to a gig, hence 'Getting Closer' [to the venue] and, upon arrival, 'We're Open Tonight'". The notion of live performance is then reflected in the sequencing of what Madinger and Easter term "heavier rock tracks such as 'Spin It On'".

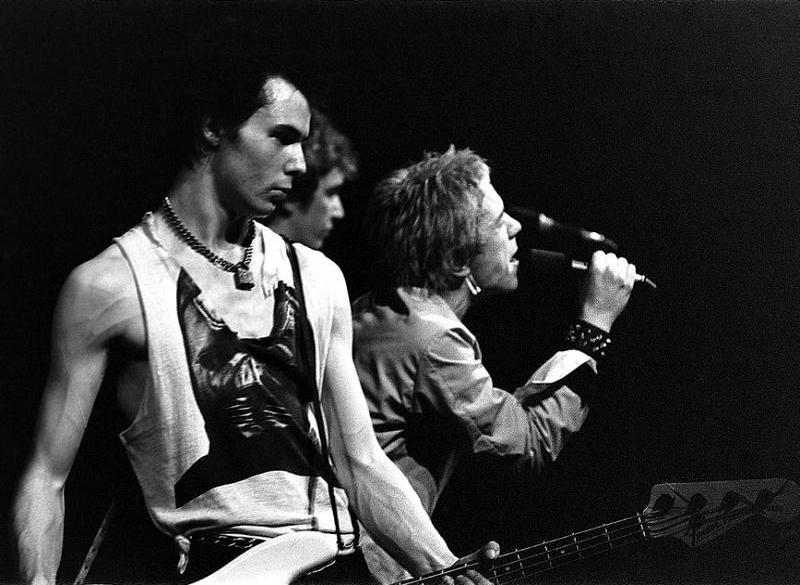
The Sex Pistols (pictured in concert in 1977), part of the punk and new-wave phenomenon that inspired some songs on Back to the Egg

McCartney had recorded a piano demo for "Getting Closer" in 1974, at which point the song had a slower tempo. Author and Mojo contributor Tom Doyle describes Wings' version as "power-popping" and reminiscent of the English band Squeeze. The mellow "We're Open Tonight" was written at the McCartneys' farm in Campbeltown, Scotland, and was the album's title track until Linda suggested Back to the Egg.

Another song composed in Scotland, the fast-tempo "Spin It On" was an obvious acknowledgment of punk and new wave; author Vincent Benitez terms it "McCartney-esque whimsy on punk steroids". Laurence Juber talked about his guitar solo in Luca Perasi's book Back to the Egg. The Story of Wings' Last Album: "It just seemed natural – especially with a song called 'Spin It On' – to get these spinning like guitar lines happening". Laine's composition "Again and Again and Again" similarly has "echoes of the Clash", according to McCartney biographer Howard Sounes. This song was originally two separate pieces, which Laine combined on McCartney's recommendation.

Although credited to McCartney alone, "Old Siam, Sir" marked "the most collective band involvement" as regards songwriting, Madinger and Easter suggest. Similar in style to "Spin It On", the song features a keyboard riff written by Linda and a Holley-composed middle eight; in addition, Laine helped McCartney complete the composition, an early version of which the previous incarnation of Wings had demoed in July 1976. (Note: Laine and Holley each claimed to have written the main guitar riff to "Old Siam, Sir". On the day that Wings recorded the song, a disagreement over this issue almost led to a physical confrontation between the two musicians.) "Arrow Through Me", a track more in keeping with McCartney's melodic pop style, is a song written from the perspective of a rejected lover. With a musical arrangement that eschews guitar backing for synthesizer, Fender Rhodes piano and horns, Benitez views it as "reminiscent of the techno-pop style of Stevie Wonder". As Steve Holley told author Luca Perasi, the backing track was recorded with only McCartney and himself, with Holley playing drums and some special percussion.

=== "Over Easy" ===
Opening side two, "Rockestra Theme" was a composition that McCartney had first recorded in 1974, on the same piano demo tape as "Getting Closer". "Rockestra Theme" is an instrumental – except for the shouted line "Why haven't I had any dinner?", which author Robert Rodriguez describes as a "deliberate evocation" of Glenn Miller's 1940 single "Pennsylvania 6-5000". Another rock track, "To You" includes a lyric aimed at a lover who has wronged the singer. The guitar solo on the recording provides an unusual aspect for a Wings song, in that Juber played the part through an Eventide harmonizer while McCartney simultaneously altered the harmonizer's settings from the studio's control room.

McCartney deemed the two gospel-influenced pieces making up "After the Ball/Million Miles" as being of insufficient quality to merit inclusion as separate tracks; "After the Ball" ends with a guitar solo, edited from parts played by McCartney, Laine and Juber, after which "Million Miles" consists of a performance by McCartney alone, on concertina. This is followed by another medley, "Winter Rose/Love Awake", both portions of which McCartney had demoed at Rude Studio, his home studio at Campbeltown, in 1977. (Note: "Million Miles" was another older song of McCartney's, dating from the 1974 demo session, which Madinger and Easter suggest was recorded in Los Angeles.)

"The Broadcast" is another instrumental, designed to give the impression of several radio signals interlaced, and bringing full-circle the concept established in the album's opening track, "Reception". Over a musical backing of piano, mellotron and gizmotron, it features readings taken from the plays The Sport of Kings by Ian Hay and The Little Man by John Galsworthy. As a return to the proposed working-band concept, "So Glad to See You Here", Rodriguez writes, "[evokes] the anticipation of a live act guaranteed to 'knock 'em dead'" and so recalls Wings' 1975–76 show-opening medley "Venus and Mars/Rock Show". During the outro, the band reprise a line from "We're Open Tonight". The album ends with a jazz-inflected ballad, "Baby's Request", which McCartney wrote for American vocal group the Mills Brothers, after seeing them perform in the South of France during the summer of 1978.

== Production ==
The band first rehearsed material for Back to the Egg in London, at the offices of McCartney's company MPL Communications in Soho Square, before carrying out further rehearsals in Scotland, in June 1978. As on his other Wings recordings over 1978–79, Thomas worked with Phil McDonald as his recording engineer, at McCartney's insistence, rather than Bill Price, who was the producer's preferred engineer. (Note: Among their pre-Back to the Egg recordings together, Wings worked in London on two McCartney songs intended for the 1978 Hollywood films Heaven Can Wait and Same Time Next Year, neither of which was used at the time.)

=== Recording and overdubbing ===
==== June–July 1978: Spirit of Ranachan Studios ====
The recording sessions for Back to the Egg began on 29 June 1978 at Spirit of Ranachan Studios – another, larger recording facility on the McCartneys' Campbeltown farm – using equipment loaned from Mickie Most's RAK Studio in London. The basic tracks were recorded with a spontaneity that had been absent in Wings' past work, employing an approach that Juber has described as a "back-to-basics, garage band kind of feel".

Sessions at Spirit of Ranachan lasted until 27 July, during which the band taped and added overdubs to "Arrow Through Me", "Again and Again and Again", "To You", "Winter Rose", "Old Siam, Sir" and "Spin It On". Basic tracks were also completed for "Cage", a song that remained in the proposed running order for the album until early in 1979, "Crawl of the Wild", "Weep for Love", "Ballroom Dancing" and "Maisie". These last three compositions would all appear on solo albums by members of Wings between 1980 and 1982. (Note: Laine's "Weep for Love" appeared on his album Japanese Tears (1980), McCartney re-recorded "Ballroom Dancing" for Tug of War (1982), and the Juber-composed "Maisie" was included on the guitarist's solo debut, Standard Time (1982).)

In addition, the band filmed a promotional video for the London Town single "I've Had Enough" while in Scotland and, in early July, recorded demos of twelve pieces intended for the Rupert the Bear film soundtrack. In the case of the latter activity, none of these compositions were revisited for what became Rupert and the Frog Song (1984). (Note: Of the twelve tracks that Wings recorded, some dated from fragments of songs played by McCartney during, variously, the Beatles' Get Back rehearsals in January 1969, the initial recording for his and Linda's album Ram in 1970, and demo sessions such as that for the 1974 piano tape.)

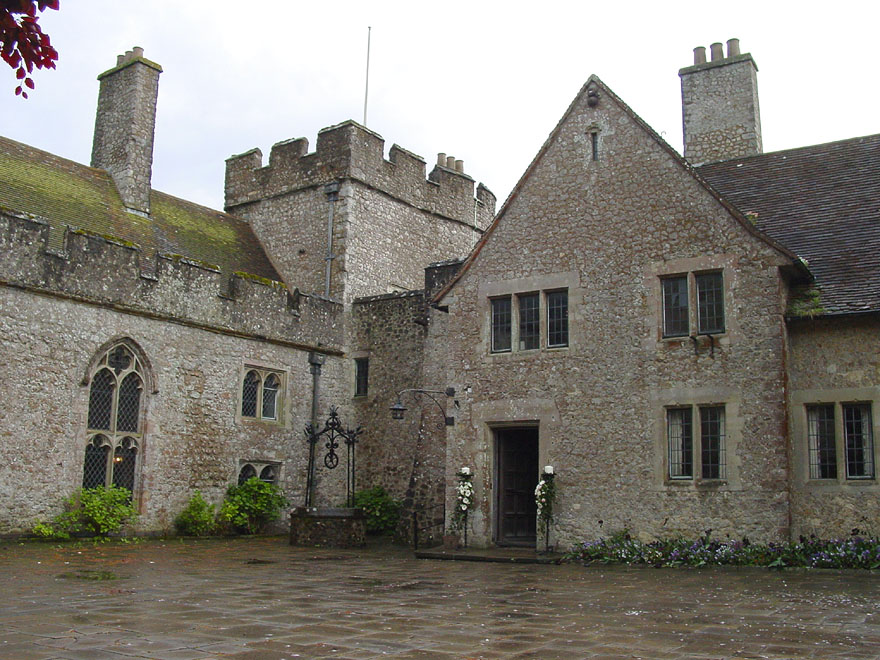
Lympne Castle in Kent, where Wings recorded part of Back to the Egg and filmed the video for their single "Old Siam, Sir"

==== September 1978: Lympne Castle ====
After a break to allow for school summer holidays, recording recommenced on 11 September at Lympne Castle in Kent, using the RAK mobile recording equipment, as before. The choice of location was partly due to the castle's proximity to the McCartneys' property "Waterfall", in Peasmarsh, East Sussex. During sessions lasting through to 29 September, the band recorded "We're Open Tonight", "Love Awake", "After the Ball", "Million Miles", "Reception" and "The Broadcast". McCartney recorded "Million Miles" outdoors, on a balcony of the castle. As Laurence Juber told author Luca Perasi: "There's a dimension to it that you don’t get if you have to [record inside]; it's so open, and I think it fits the mood of the lyric."

Recording took place mainly in the castle's great hall, with Holly's drum kit positioned in the fireplace. McCartney and Juber taped their acoustic guitar parts for "We're Open Tonight" in a stairwell. Excerpted from books found in the library, the readings for "Reception" and "The Broadcast" were overdubbed in the kitchen and performed by the owners of Lympne Castle, Harold and Dierdre Margary.

==== October–December 1978: Abbey Road Studios ====
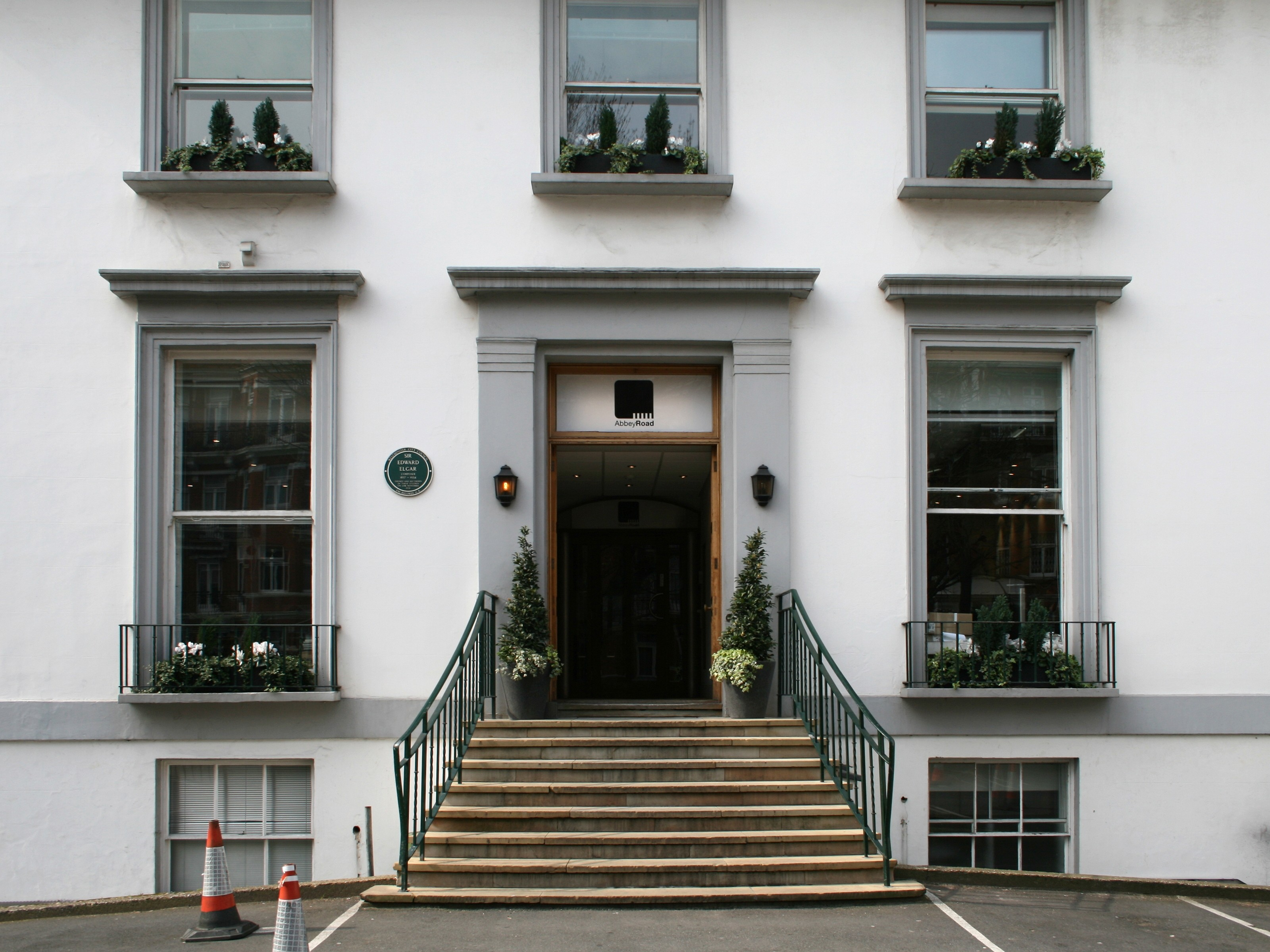
London's Abbey Road Studios – another location for the album's recording

Sessions moved to Abbey Road Studios in London on 3 October. That day, Wings joined with a supergroup of guest musicians, collectively known as "Rockestra", to record the tracks "Rockestra Theme" and "So Glad to See You Here". A camera crew led by Barry Chattington filmed the proceedings, and a 40-minute documentary, titled Rockestra, was later compiled from the footage. Equipment used for this session included 60 microphones, a pair of mixing consoles and a 16-track recording desk. James Honeyman-Scott of the Pretenders, Hank Marvin of the Shadows, the Who's Pete Townshend, Pink Floyd's David Gilmour, Led Zeppelin's John Paul Jones and John Bonham, and the Attractions' Bruce Thomas all took part. Also among the line-up was the horn section from Wings' 1975–76 world tour, consisting of Howie Casey, Tony Dorsey, Thaddeus Richard and Steve Howard. Keith Moon was meant to participate, but he had died shortly before the session; Jeff Beck and Eric Clapton were also scheduled to appear.

On 10 October, Wings taped "Getting Closer" at Abbey Road, along with a demo of "Baby's Request". McCartney had intended this recording of "Baby's Request" for the Mills Brothers to use as a guide, but after they asked to be paid for recording the song, he instead included the demo on Back to the Egg. Contrary to popular belief based on a photo shot in the studio, McCartney did not play the stand-up bass in the song, as revealed in an interview with Laurence Juber conducted by Perasi for his book Back to the Egg: The Story of Wings' Last Album. The band then continued with overdubs on these and other songs intermittently through October and November, finishing at Abbey Road on 1 December.

==== December 1978 – February 1979: Replica Studio ====
Towards the end of the year, Wings also carried out overdubs at the newly built Replica Studio, located at MPL's Soho Square offices. Frustrated at the impending unavailability of Abbey Road's Studio Two – which studio owner and record company EMI needed for its other acts, besides Wings – McCartney had constructed an exact replica of Studio Two in the basement at MPL. (Note: According to Madinger and Easter, McCartney had to make way for block-booked sessions for Cliff Richard's new album, Rock 'n' Roll Juvenile (1979). Doyle writes that the competing project was in fact an album by "EMI's new darling", Kate Bush.) Among the work done on Back to the Egg at Replica, the band replaced the final twenty seconds of "So Glad to See You Here" with what Madinger and Easter describe as "a reggae-styled coda", containing the "We're Open Tonight" reprise.

Sessions continued there in January and February 1979. During that time, the band recorded a non-album single – the disco-styled "Goodnight Tonight", backed with "Daytime Nighttime Suffering" – as a release to coincide with the airing of the long-delayed Wings Over the World special. While noting that McCartney and Laine's relationship was beginning to unravel at this point, Sounes compares the freshness of these new recordings with the drawn-out sessions for Back to the Egg and writes that the album "was now so overworked it might more aptly have been titled Over-Egged". Impatient at the amount of time being spent in the recording studio, Laine publicly admitted that he was "desperate" to go out on tour.

=== Final overdubbing and mixing ===
In March, Wings moved back to Abbey Road Studios to complete the album. Vocal overdubs were then added to "Winter Rose/Love Awake" and an orchestral-sounding mellotron part to the end of "Getting Closer". Having worked with the Black Dyke Mills Band in the 1960s, when he produced their 1968 single "Thingumybob" for Apple Records, McCartney invited the band down from Yorkshire to overdub brass accompaniment on "Winter Rose/Love Awake". The overdub session, which took place on 1 April 1979, lasted "most of the day" and involved a 26-piece band.

While mixing the album during March, Wings finally discarded the song "Cage", which had been sequenced as the second track, following "Reception". The same alternative running order paired the Rockestra recordings at the end of side two, so that the album closed with the "We're Open Tonight" coda. Holly later recalled that whereas beforehand the band had been confident that Back to the Egg would be a strong album, during the final mixing process "[it] dawned on us there might be problems". At the last minute, "Baby's Request" replaced "Cage" and the running order was revised, with the result that the working-band concept became less pronounced. Thomas grew frustrated at the long mixing process. Although he tried to provide input, he found it difficult because "Paul is very determined about what he wants". By April, the two's relationship had fractured significantly. EMI's Nick Webb mastered the album.

== Artwork and promotional videos ==
The design for the album's artwork was by Hipgnosis, the company responsible for previous Wings album covers such as Venus and Mars (1975) and the Wings Greatest compilation (1978). The front cover depicts the five members of Wings in a room, looking down through space at Planet Earth through an open hatchway in the floor; the statuette of Semiramis above the mantlepiece behind them is the same that appears in the Wings Greatest artwork. The picture was taken by photographer John Shaw at his London studio. The set was specially constructed using forced perspective, with the floorboards and hatchway artificially tapered, allowing the look of a wide-angle photograph without any distortion to the subjects to either side of McCartney. Photos of the individual band members appeared on the back cover, credited to Linda and Paul McCartney.

Working with film company Keef & Co., Wings filmed seven promotional videos for the album, which would later be compiled into the Back to the Egg TV special. Filming took place between 4 and 13 June, at locations including Lympne Castle's main hall, a private airfield at Lympne, Camber Sands in East Sussex, and Keef & Co.'s London studios. (Note: In their section covering the filming, Madinger and Easter list the same locations but give dates of 28 May to 6 June, during which Wings had also returned to Lympne Castle for a second set of recording sessions.) "Old Siam, Sir", "Getting Closer", "Spin It On" and "Arrow Through Me" were among the tracks for which videos were made.

== Release ==
"Goodnight Tonight" had been issued on Columbia Records in America, marking McCartney's break from EMI-affiliated Capitol Records, although he and Wings remained with EMI's Parlophone label in the UK. McCartney's contract with Columbia made him the highest-paid recording artist in the world. (Note: McCartney's royalty rate was 20 per cent of each copy of an album sold, a rate that McGee describes as "remarkable" for that time.) As an incentive for McCartney, Columbia's parent company, CBS, had added to his publishing portfolio by giving him the highly profitable Frank Music catalogue – making McCartney the copyright holder to Guys and Dolls and other popular musicals by Frank Loesser.

Back to the Egg was released on 24 May 1979 in the US (as Columbia FC-36057), and on 8 June in the UK (as Parlophone PCTC 257). (Note: While the US release date was 24 May according to McGee and Beatles Diary compiler Keith Badman, Madinger and Easter give it as 11 June, a week after Columbia issued the album's lead single there.) In Britain, "Old Siam, Sir" was the album's first single, whereas "Getting Closer" was the choice in America; in both cases, "Spin It On" was the B-side. On 11 June, an album launch party took place inside Abbey Road's Studio Two, which had been blacked-out like a large frying pan, while tables carrying yellow parasols represented fried eggs sitting in the pan. Part of Chattington's Rockestra documentary was screened during the event, the only public airing the film received.

The follow-up singles, issued in August, were "Arrow Through Me" in the US and "Getting Closer" in the UK, the latter release a double A-side with "Baby's Request". In some European countries, "Rockestra Theme" was released as a single.

Compared to the major commercial success of previous Wings albums, sales of Back to the Egg were disappointing, and none of its singles became significant hits. In the UK, "Old Siam, Sir" and "Getting Closer" climbed to number 35 and number 60, respectively. On America's Billboard Hot 100 chart, "Getting Closer" peaked at number 20, and "Arrow Through Me" at number 29. Back to the Egg reached number 6 in the UK and number 8 on the Billboard 200, although US chart compilers Cashbox and Record World both listed it at number 7. With heavy promotion from Columbia, the album sold over 1 million copies in America; in Britain, retail outlets soon slashed its price in an attempt to dispense with their surplus of stock.

McCartney later reflected that for an act other than Wings, sales such as those for Back to the Egg would have been considered "very healthy". Given CBS's substantial investment in their new signing, Madinger and Easter write, the album's apparent failure led to a period of "mutual finger-pointing between Paul and Columbia Records", lasting until his contract expired in 1985. (Note: Columbia had wanted to maximise the album's commercial potential by including "Goodnight Tonight", a worldwide hit, but McCartney had vetoed its inclusion.)

== Reception ==
Professional ratings
Review scores
Source	Rating
AllMusic	3/5 stars
Christgau's Record Guide	C
The Essential Rock Discography	5/10
MusicHound Rock	1/5 stars
Q	3/5 stars
Record Mirror	3/5 stars
The Rolling Stone Album Guide	2/5 stars
Smash Hits	6/10

Back to the Egg received predominantly negative reviews on release; author Alan Clayson writes of the album receiving "a critical mauling as vicious as that for London Town". In an especially unfavourable critique for Rolling Stone magazine, Timothy White described it as "the sorriest grab bag of dreck in recent memory" and lamented that none of the songs were "the least bit fleshed out", with the listener instead given "an irritating display of disjointed images and unfocused musical snapshots". After opining that, since 1970, "this ex-Beatle has been lending his truly prodigious talents ... to some of the laziest records in the history of rock & roll", White wrote: "Who, one felt compelled to ask, is in charge here? Back to the Egg provides the final, obvious answer: no one." In Sounds magazine, Tony Mitchell called all of the songs easily forgettable and the music "complacent and formula-ridden".

According to Allan Kozinn and Adrian Sinclair, many critics considered the variety of musical styles "diffuse" rather than "varied". Record Mirror's Ronnie Gurr called the album "a tremendously muddled lucky bag of half-baked concepts" that lacked "strong direction" and "instant classics". Village Voice critic Robert Christgau said of McCartney and the new Wings album: "When he's on, Paulie's abundant tunefulness passes for generosity. Here he's just hoping something will stick." In Melody Maker, Ray Coleman wrote that McCartney "seems to be on a treadmill of banality". Coleman described "Rockestra Theme" and "So Glad to See You Here" as "creditable, rolling, raunchy and at least efficient, with Paul's voice at its rocking best on the last named track", but concluded: "This album gets Wings nowhere ..." In The New York Times, John Rockwell did not find Wings' punk experiments persuasive: "Punk is... about passion [...] an intermittent quality in Mr. McCartney's pop confections. Here the pop is less shiny and smooth, but there isn't much real emotion to compensate."

In a more positive assessment, for Creem magazine, Mitchell Cohen highlighted the album's second side as "a collection of McCartney performances that string together like abbey roadwork", and praised McCartney's vocals relative to his past work, writing: "all of the current tracks are terser, sung better, have less of what I suppose would be called the recording artist's equivalent of camera consciousness." Billboard's reviewer gave Back to the Egg "Spotlight" status (meaning "the most outstanding new product of the week's releases and that with the greatest potential for top of the chart placement") and commented: "The music features typical McCartney fare of late with nothing here that will distinguish it as one of his classics. The arrangements, though, are interesting, encompassing a variety of styles." To NME critic Bob Woffinden, the attempt at an album-wide concept was "a pretty half-baked one" and Hipgnosis' cover photo was "easily the album's strongest point". While identifying the songs as "particularly weak lyrically", Woffinden concluded: "It was the familiar McCartney problem. He had every essential creative requirement, except the discipline required to knead the parts into a perfect whole."

Retrospective reviews have remained generally unfavourable. AllMusic critic Stephen Thomas Erlewine views Back to the Egg as "a set of [McCartney's] most undistinguished songs" that "have no spark whatsoever", and bemoans "the weak sound of the record and Wings' faceless performances". Ultimate Classic Rock's Nick DeRiso wrote that the album feels like a half-baked attempt at experimenting with punk and new wave before retreating into "some of McCartney's more recognizable indulgences". Among McCartney biographers, Vincent Benitez writes that the songs are "uneven in quality", and Howard Sounes describes the album as "a curate's egg, good in parts, with token attempts at sounding contemporary". Tom Doyle views "the new wave-ish rockers" like "Spin It On" as "too smoothed out to be truly edgy" and the two spoken-word tracks as "weird – and not in a good way". Doyle considers that while Back to the Egg has its "moments of inspiration", "There was too much material [recorded during the sessions], and yet not enough of it to gel into a cohesive album." Perasi remarks that the album "represented another stylistic turning point for McCartney... and offers a fresh style" but at the same time it "contains the usual genre diversity which had always distinguished McCartney’s productions".

== Aftermath and reissues ==
These days you talk to some young people and it's really cool if you don't make the charts. It's very alien to my way of thinking ... [But] in a way it's quite cool to have a few albums that didn't make it. I didn't mean [Back to the Egg] to be underground, but it's nice.

— McCartney, 2001, reflecting on the relative failure of the album

With the album falling well short of Columbia's and McCartney's expectations commercially, McCartney spent the remainder of the summer of 1979 recording in Peasmarsh and Campbeltown, without Wings, creating his solo album McCartney II (1980). During November and December 1979, US TV stations aired the 31-minute Back to the Egg special, as Wings undertook a nineteen-show UK tour, the first leg of the proposed world tour. Among the songs in the setlist, they performed several tracks from Back to the Egg: "Getting Closer", "Again and Again and Again", "Old Siam, Sir", "Spin It On" and "Arrow Through Me".

The band were scheduled to tour Japan during January and February 1980, but the concerts, together with their tour dates elsewhere in the world, were cancelled after McCartney was arrested for possession of drugs when entering the country. Around this time, "Rockestra Theme" won the Grammy Award for Best Rock Instrumental Performance. Wings regrouped in October 1980 to finish off songs for the planned Cold Cuts album, a compilation that McCartney had suggested when CBS sought to recover part of its financial losses from Back to the Egg. (Note: Originally planned as an Apple Records budget release in 1974, Cold Cuts was turned down by Columbia.) The reunion with Wings was short-lived and the band discontinued upon Laine's departure in April 1981.

On 20 June 1989, by which time McCartney had returned to Capitol Records, Back to the Egg was released on CD in America with three bonus tracks: "Daytime Nighttime Suffering", McCartney's 1979 Christmas single "Wonderful Christmastime", and the latter's B-side, "Rudolph the Red-Nosed Reggae". In August 1993, Parlophone reissued the album as part of The Paul McCartney Collection with the same three bonus tracks. Samples of "Reception" and "The Broadcast" appeared on the Fireman's Strawberries Oceans Ships Forest (1993) album, a collaboration between McCartney and Youth. In 2007, Back to the Egg was released on iTunes, with a remix of "Goodnight Tonight" as a bonus track.

== Track listing ==
All songs written by Paul McCartney, except where noted.

Side one: Sunny Side Up

1. "Reception" – 1:08
2. "Getting Closer" – 3:22
3. "We're Open Tonight" – 1:28
4. "Spin It On" – 2:12
5. "Again and Again and Again" (Denny Laine) – 3:34
6. "Old Siam, Sir" – 4:11
7. "Arrow Through Me" – 3:37

Side two: Over Easy

1. "Rockestra Theme" – 2:35
2. "To You" – 3:12
3. "After the Ball / Million Miles" – 4:00
4. "Winter Rose / Love Awake" – 4:58
5. "The Broadcast" – 1:30
6. "So Glad to See You Here" – 3:20
7. "Baby's Request" – 2:49

CD bonus tracks

15. "Daytime Nighttime Suffering" – 3:23
16. "Wonderful Christmastime" – 3:49
17. "Rudolph the Red-Nosed Reggae" (Johnny Marks) – 1:48

== Personnel ==
Wings and additional personnel per Benitez. Rockestra line-up and production per sleeve.

Wings

- Paul McCartney – lead and backing vocals, bass, acoustic and electric guitars, keyboards, concertina on "Million Miles", piano and harpsichord on "Winter Rose"
- Linda McCartney – keyboards, backing vocals
- Denny Laine – lead vocal on "Again and Again and Again", electric and acoustic guitars, backing vocals
- Laurence Juber – electric and acoustic guitars, guitar synthesizer, bass on "Love Awake"
- Steve Holley – drums, percussion

Additional personnel

- Black Dyke Mills Band – horns on "Love Awake"
- Dierdre Margary, Harold Margary – book readings

Rockestra line-up on "Rockestra Theme" and "So Glad to See You Here"

- Denny Laine, Laurence Juber, David Gilmour, Hank Marvin, Pete Townshend – guitars
- Steve Holley, John Bonham, Kenney Jones – drums
- Paul McCartney, John Paul Jones, Ronnie Lane, Bruce Thomas – basses
- Paul McCartney, Gary Brooker, John Paul Jones – pianos
- Linda McCartney, Tony Ashton – keyboards
- Speedy Acquaye, Tony Carr, Ray Cooper, Morris Pert – percussion
- Howie Casey, Tony Dorsey, Steve Howard, Thaddeus Richard – horns

Production

- Paul McCartney and Chris Thomas – producers
- Phil McDonald – engineer
- Mark Vigars – assistant engineer
- John Shaw – front cover photo
- Linda McCartney, Paul McCartney – back cover photos
- Hipgnosis – design

== Accolades ==
=== Grammy Awards ===
Year	Nominee / work	Award	Result
1980	"Rockestra Theme"	Best Rock Instrumental Performance	Won

== Charts and certifications ==
=== Weekly charts ===
Chart (1979)	Peak position
Australia (Kent Music Report)	3
Austrian Albums (Ö3 Austria Top 40)	12
Canadian Albums (RPM)	2
Dutch Mega Albums (MegaCharts)	11
Italian Albums (FIMI)	10
Japanese LPs (Oricon)	7
New Zealand Albums (RIANZ)	9
Norwegian Albums (VG-lista)	5
Spanish Albums (Promusicae)	7
Swedish Albums (Sverigetopplistan)	5
UK Albums Chart	6
US Billboard 200	8
West German Albums (Media Control)	16

=== Year-end charts ===
Chart (1979)	Position
Australian Albums (Kent Music Report)	22
Canadian Albums (RPM)	20
French Albums	17
Italian Albums	37

=== Certifications and sales ===
Region	Certification	Certified units/sales
Japan (Oricon Charts)	—	74,000
Canada (Music Canada)	2× Platinum	200,000^{^}
United Kingdom (BPI)	Gold	100,000^{^}
United States (RIAA)	Platinum	1,000,000^{^}
^{^} Shipments figures based on certification alone.
