= Getting Closer (song) =

1979 single by Wings

Single by Wings

from the album Back to the Egg
- A-side: "Baby's Request" (UK) (double A-side)
- B-side: "Spin It On" (US)
- Released: 5 June 1979 (US); 17 August 1979 (UK)
- Recorded: October 1978 – March 1979
- Studio: Abbey Road Studios, London
- Genre: Pop rock; power pop; new wave
- Length: 3:21
- Label: Parlophone/EMI (UK); Columbia (US)
- Songwriter: Paul McCartney
- Producers: Paul McCartney; Chris Thomas

Wings singles chronology
"Old Siam, Sir" (1979)	"Getting Closer" (1979)	"Arrow Through Me" (1979)

Alternative cover
- French 7-Inch single cover

"Getting Closer" is a song written by Paul McCartney that was first released on Wings' 1979 album Back to the Egg. It was also released as the lead single off Back to the Egg in the US, and it was later released as a double-A sided single with "Baby's Request" in the UK.

== Background ==
McCartney started working on "Getting Closer" in April May 1973, with its first demo recording being made then by actor Dustin Hoffman on holiday in Montego Bay, Jamaica. In 1974, McCartney made a piano demo for the song.

"Getting Closer" and the unreleased song "Cage" were off of demos, the latter being one that Paul and Denny did together. There were times when there was a demo aspect to the sessions, and in some cases we created demos to see how the tune was shaping up.

— Laurence Juber, Daytrippin'

Upon being resurrected by the band for Back to the Egg, the song, originally at a slower tempo, was transformed into a "driving rocker." When Wings first recorded a version in September 1978 using a mobile recording unit at Lympne Caste, Denny Laine sang the lead vocal, Paul McCartney played bass, Linda McCartney played keyboards, Laine and Laurence Juber played electric guitars, and Steve Holley played drums. Although this recording was energetic, Paul McCartney was not satisfied with it.

The band rerecorded the song in October 1978. This time, Paul McCartney played electric guitar and bass guitar, Laine and Juber played both electric and acoustic guitars, Linda McCartney played organ and Holley again played drums, while Laine again sang the lead vocal. Juber said of the guitars used in the song: "I think I played my Martin D28 on the rhythm track and some Les Paul Custom (the one in the video) for the electric."Paul McCartney also added a Mellotron during the coda, despite Juber preferring to play a guitar solo. After several unsuccessful attempts at mixing this version, Paul McCartney decided to overdub his own lead vocal in March 1979, replacing Laine's. With that done, he completed a successful mix on 23 March 1979.

== Music and lyrics ==
"Getting Closer" is in the key of A major. McCartney biographer John Blaney described it as "an energetic rocker." Like most of the songs off of Back to the Egg, "Getting Closer" bears an influence from punk and new wave music. Author and Mojo contributor Tom Doyle described Wings' version as "power-popping" and reminiscent of the English band Squeeze.

"Getting Closer" is essentially a love song, using the term "my salamander" as a term of endearment. Paul explained the unusual choice of words:

I remember Linda telling me a story about how when she was a kid, she was a fan of nature, just like I was, and she would look under stones to find a lizard or a newt, which she would call a "salamander". I lived the idea that in her world it was "salamander" – much more exotic. Salamanders have a mythical aspect, born in fire, so that's how the salamander made its way in.

The first verse described the singer driving in the rain searching for a song to play on the radio, connecting the song with the opening track of Back to the Egg, "Reception", which contains snippets of radio recordings. In the three bridges, the singer asks his lover to reject his rival, then asks her to see him, then tells her he's "getting closer" to her. In the chorus he sings that he's getting closer to her heart. The melody of the chorus ascends from E to D to an F on the word "closer" before descending to C sharp. The chorus also incorporates a borrowed chord of Dm/A to increase the expressiveness.

== Release ==
"Getting Closer", backed with "Spin It On", was released in the US in June 1979 as the first single from Back to the Egg. The single reached No. 20 on the Billboard Hot 100, as well as No. 20 on Cashbox and No. 22 on Record World. Despite not being released as the first single in the UK ("Old Siam, Sir" was used instead), the song did see a UK single release in August 1979. Marketed as a Double A-side with "Baby's Request", the single was a relative flop, only peaking at No. 60.

For the release of Back to the Egg, a special was made featuring music videos for multiple songs, including "Getting Closer." "Old Siam, Sir", "Spin It On", "Again and Again and Again" and "Arrow Through Me" were among the tracks for which videos were made. The "Getting Closer" video showed the band miming playing the song in the same airplane hangar at the Eagle Parachute Club they used for the "Spin It On" video.

The song was later included on The 7" Singles Box in 2022 and on the deluxe edition of Wings in 2025.

== Reception ==
Billboard described "Getting Closer" as "an uplifting raker in which McCartney's soaring vocals play off strong guitar, keyboards and drum lines." Cash Box called it "a dynamic, churning pop-rocker," saying that the "slamming guitar and aggressive vocals" were reminiscent of Band on the Run. Record World called it "another superbly crafted McCartney hook." Melody Maker critic Ray Coleman felt it was comparable to Wings' earlier hit single "Jet". But Melody Maker critic Ian Birch criticized Pauls "sloppy vocals" and Laine's and Linda's "hideous harmonies" but praised the "unexpected sizzling fade." Birch also claimed that it could have been a "minor league nugget" if Cliff Richard had recorded it with Bruce Welch producing.NME critics Roy Carr and Tony Tyler called it "glib and meaningless." Music journalist Andrew Wild called it a "typical tight Wings rocker".

Something Else! critics S. Victor Aaron and Nick DeRiso both criticized McCartney's use of the word "salamander" as a term of endearment in the song, with Aaron suggesting that McCartney left in what was supposed to be a temporary lyric. DeRiso called it a "propulsively enjoyable tune", particularly praising Laurence Juber's guitar riff but criticizing the song's "swirling, rather confusing fade out." Sacramento Union critic Mick Martin wrote that "'I'm getting closer, my salamander' stands as one of the worst refrains in rock history," although he praised the song's melody. Abilene Reporter News writer Scott Frisbie also mocked the use of the term "salamander" as a term of endeearment as being "downright ridiculous." Rolling Stone critic Timothy White's reaction to the lines "I'm getting closer, my Salamander/When will we be there?/Oh no, don't answer" was "Mercifully, no lyric sheet is provided."

== Live performances ==
Wings played "Getting Closer" live during the Wings UK Tour 1979. They intended to replace it with "Jet" for the Japan leg of the tour that ended up getting cancelled due to McCartney's marijuana arrest.

== Charts ==
=== Weekly charts ===
Chart (1979)	Peak position
Australia (Kent Music Report)	57
Canada (RPM)	18
Irish Singles Chart	24
Netherlands (Dutch Top 40)	29
UK Singles Chart	60
US Billboard Hot 100	20

=== Year-end charts ===
Chart (1979)	Rank
Canada (RPM)	127
US (Joel Whitburn's Pop Annual)	136

== Personnel ==
- Paul McCartney – vocals, bass, Epiphone Casino electric guitar, Mellotron
- Linda McCartney – keyboards, backing vocals
- Denny Laine – electric guitar, Martin D28 acoustic guitar, backing vocals
- Laurence Juber – electric guitar, Ovation acoustic guitar
- Steve Holley – drums
