= Old Siam, Sir =

1979 single by Wings

Single by Wings

from the album Back to the Egg
- B-side: "Spin It On"
- Released: 1 June 1979 (UK)
- Recorded: 29 June – 27 July 1978
- Studio: Spirit of Ranachan, Campbeltown
- Genre: Rock
- Length: 4:14
- Label: Parlophone/EMI (UK)
- Songwriter: Paul McCartney
- Producers: Paul McCartney; Chris Thomas

Wings singles chronology
"Goodnight Tonight" (1979)	"Old Siam, Sir" (1979)	"Getting Closer" (1979)

"Old Siam, Sir" is a single written by Paul McCartney and released on Wings' 1979 album, Back to the Egg. It was the A-side of the UK version of the single, reaching No. 35. The B-side, "Spin It On" in the UK was also a track from the album, "Back to the Egg". "Old Siam, Sir" was also the B-side of the US single "Arrow Through Me". The song was later included on The 7" Singles Box in 2022.

== Recording ==
Wings recorded "Old Siam, Sir" on 18 July 1978 at a studio set up at Spirit of Ranachan farm in Campbeltown.

As originally written, McCartney had the lyrics but the song lacked a bridge. The lack of a bridge was remedied by incorporating an instrumental section that evolved from a jam. Wings drummer Steve Holley, while playing keyboards during a studio session, developed a chord sequence that was eventually used in the instrumental section of the song. According to Wings guitarist Laurence Juber:

We were jamming one day and Steve Holley was playing keyboards and had this chord sequence. I'm not sure if Paul was playing drums or if it was Linda because we'd trade off in a jamming situation, but what ended up happening was that ended up in the instrumental section of the song. I always felt that Steve should have received some sort of nod for that. Unfortunately, that's the nature of the process in that you don't always get full credit for what you contribute as a musician, especially as the song writing is traditionally words and melody, not chords, licks and grooves. If you could copyright a rhythm, Bo Diddley would have been very happy.

The initial recording had Paul McCartney played a Fender Rhodes electric piano, Juber and Denny Laine played electric guitar, and Holley played drums. For the instrumental bridge, Paul McCartney played an Epiphone Casino and Juber played a Gibson Les Paul Custom, with McCartney playing the lower part and Juber playing the higher part. Paul McCartney sang the lead vocal.

Mixing was completed on 2 March 1979.

== Lyrics and music ==
The lyrics to "Old Siam, Sir" tell a somewhat silly story about a girl coming to the UK from Thailand, which used to be called Siam, in order to find a husband. The quest proved unsuccessful. McCartney said that:

"Old Siam" is...silly lyrics, as usual. It's about some chick coming over from the Orient. When you see them written out they make quite a bit of sense. Because in the second verse she meets like a film director, and he takes her home to see his mam, and then she gets a letter from Siam. Some tragedy happens there, and she needs some money. And she wanders around in Walthamstow and Scarborough again, and then the director finds out that she's been getting money from unsolicited...And then he directed her not to stay.

According to producer Chris Thomas, the music was influenced by punk music. It also shows influence of new wave music. McCartney biographer John Blaney described it as "some of the rawest material [McCartney had] recorded in years."

The song's riff attempts to provide an exotic atmosphere. The song's intro, outro and all the verses and instrumental interludes are based on a repeated power chord in the key of E major, followed by D and E notes. The guitar solos are based on A minor chords.

== Reception ==
Sounds critic garry Bushell called "Old Siam, Sir" "some spineless pretend-rock from the clapped-out old phony John Lennon." Melody maker critic Vivien Goldman praised the "big, ringing sound" and said that "the song is so stripped down to the hook that you can't miss it. Record Mirror critics James Parade and Monique called it "awful". Blaney called it "gritty but uninspired".

Music critics Roy Carr and Tony Tyler reviewed the single saying "The empurpled shade of Jimi Hendrix signs up for the cast of The King and I". Something Else! critic S. Victor Aaron praised the guitar riff and said that it "would have been a hit in a different time." Fellow Something Else! critic Nick DeRiso also praised the riff but criticized the "borderline racist keyboard signature", although he stated that he is usually "completely absorbed in this track’s clattering attitude."

== Music video ==
As with several other songs from Back to the Egg, a music video was shot for "Old Siam, Sir", directed by Keith McMillan. The video shows the band miming a live performance of the song. The video was shot in the Great Hall of Lympne Castle in Kent, England.

== Live performances ==
Wings performed "Old Siam, Sir" live as part of the setlist for the Wings UK Tour 1979.

== Personnel ==
- Paul McCartney – vocals, bass, electric guitar
- Linda McCartney – keyboards
- Denny Laine – electric guitar
- Laurence Juber – electric guitar
- Steve Holley – drums

== Charts ==
Chart performance for "Old Siam, Sir"
Chart (1979)	Peak position
Ireland (IRMA)	29
UK Singles (Official Charts)	35
