= Arrow Through Me =

- Japanese single cover

Single by Wings

from the album Back to the Egg
- B-side: "Old Siam, Sir"
- Released: 14 August 1979 (US)
- Recorded: 29 June – 27 July 1978
- Studio: Spirit of Ranachan, Campbeltown
- Genre: Funk; soft rock
- Length: 3:37
- Label: Columbia (US)
- Songwriter: Paul McCartney
- Producer: Paul McCartney: Chris Thomas

Wings singles chronology
"Getting Closer" (1979)	"Arrow Through Me" (1979)	"Rockestra Theme" (1979)

"Arrow Through Me" is a song written by Paul McCartney that was first released on Wings' 1979 album Back to the Egg. It was also released as the second single off the album in the US, backed by "Old Siam, Sir", which was the lead single off the album in the UK. The single peaked at number 29 on the Billboard Hot 100.

== Background ==
McCartney recorded the main instrumental backing for "Arrow Through Me" on 10 July 1978 at the Spirit of Ranachan Studio that was set up on Low Ranachan Farm in Campbeltown, Scotland. He played his bass part on a Fender Rhodes electric piano, while Wings' drummer was the only other player in the session. After the initial tracks were laid, producer Chris Thomas suggested that Holley add an additional snare drum part that he recorded at half speed so that when played back at normal speed the part would be heard an octave higher than it was played and have an unusual sound. At this session, McCartney sang a rough vocal and also sang the melody where he intended to overdub horn parts. The horn parts were added in October. Mixing was completed on 9 March 1979.

"Arrow Through Me", unlike most songs on Back to the Egg, is more pop-oriented than rock-oriented. McCartney biographers Allan Kozinn and Adrian Sinclair described it as a "soft-rock number with an R&B tinge.

"Arrow Through Me", harmonically it is almost like Duke Ellington could have written it.

— Laurence Juber, Daytrippin'

Music journalist Andrew Wild described it as "slick, horn-driven pop/soul with crisp Isley Brothers drums and the bass line played on a Fender Rhodes – Stevie Wonder style".

== Reception ==
Something Else! critic S. Victor Aaron called it "McCartney when he’s on his A-game in the songcraft department." Fellow Something Else! critic Nick DeRiso felt it was the best song on Back to the Egg, criticizing the lyrics as "indecipherable" but saying that they are "superfluous anyway" given the song's groove. DeRiso later compared the keyboard bass line to those of Stevie Wonder and praised the "inventive undulating polyrhythm" played by drummer Steve Holley. DeRiso rated "Arrow Through Me" to be Wings' 8th greatest song. Billboard described it as "a light and bouncy midtempo tune with sparse orchestration." Cash Box called the song "a slightly quirky tune" and said that the instrumentation creates a "somber but light backing for the pleading vocals. Record World called it a "unique and thoroughly refreshing McCartney effort" whose rhythm "struts while the keyboards ring and bold horn charts inject energy."

Beck named the song "one of McCartney's unsung gems from the '70s", commenting, "There's just a hint of punk and new wave seeping in, but I also feel like there’s a little bit of Stevie Wonder."

== Music video ==
A music video was shot for "Arrow Through Me" directed by Keith McMillan. In the video, Wings is shown pretending to play the song. Besides Paul McCartney, band members Linda McCartney, Denny Laine and Laurence Juber are shown playing keyboards, even though Linda, Laine and Juber did not perform on the song. The video incorporates special effects in which multiple images of a band member are often shown on screen at the same time.

== Other ==
"Arrow Through Me" was later featured on the compilation albums Pure McCartney (2016), The 7" Singles Box (2022) and Wings (2025).

The song was used with the opening credits of, and as a main melody line through, the 1980 movie Oh! Heavenly Dog, starring Chevy Chase, Jane Seymour and Benji. In 2010, neo-soul artist Erykah Badu sampled "Arrow Through Me" on an album track called "Gone Baby, Don't Be Long" on her CD New Amerykah Part Two (Return of the Ankh). It also appeared in the WKRP in Cincinnati episode "God Talks to Johnny" (1979).

In 2020, the song appeared in episode 2 (track 2) of Hulu's TV series adaptation of Nick Hornby's novel High Fidelity starring Zoë Kravitz.

== Personnel ==
- Paul McCartney – vocals, keyboard bass, electric piano, clavinet
- Steve Holley – drums, Flexatone
- Howie Casey – horns
- Tony Dorsey – horns
- Steve Howard – horns
- Thaddeus Richard – horns

== Chart history ==
=== Weekly charts ===
Chart (1979)	Peak position
Canada RPM Top Singles	27
Canada RPM Adult Contemporary	6
US Billboard Hot 100	29
US Billboard Adult Contemporary	29
US Cash Box Top 100	36

=== Year-end charts ===
Chart (1979)	Rank
Canada (RPM Chart)	181
US (Joel Whitburn's Pop Annual)	178
