= Keith McMillan =

English photographer and artist

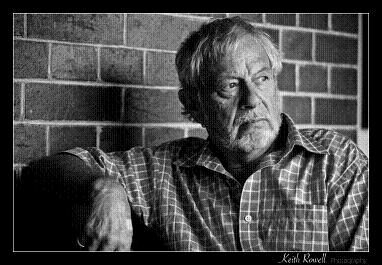
- Born: Keith Lionel McMillan; 16 April 1934; Cuckfield, Sussex, England
- Died: 22 March 2012 (aged 77)
- Known for: Ballet; photography; painting

Keith Lionel McMillan (16 April 1934 – 22 March 2012) was an English photographer and artist.

== Early life ==
Born in Cuckfield, Sussex, he came from a family with many artistic talents: his mother was a dancer, his father a pianist and photographer, and his brother an artist. As a child, McMillan demonstrated a love for music and athletics, so his mother enrolled him in ballet at the age of eight.

McMillan passed all his examinations for the Royal Academy of Dance, and at 13 received a scholarship to Sadler's Wells. At 17, he entered the Sadler's Wells Ballet Company, which became The Royal Ballet. He danced at Sadler's Wells Theatre and Covent Garden, where the principal was Dame Ninette de Valois. He was a coryphée with the Ballet from 1955 to 1966, having been the first boy given a scholarship to attend The Sadler's Wells College at Barons Court.

== Ballet career ==
Here he met and became a protégé of Dame Margot Fonteyn who nurtured his career. Other principal dancers in the Ballet at this time were Rudolph Nureyev, Sir Robert Helpmann, Alexander Grant OBE, Michael Somes, David Blair, Maura Sheera, Nadia Nareda, Beryl Grey. During his years with the Royal Ballet, McMillan toured Europe, US and UK meeting many great and famous people. Princess Margaret, Princess Grace of Monaco, The Kennedys, The Pope and many film and stage stars.

McMillan changed his name to Keith Milland to avoid confusion with Kenneth MacMillan—who was at that time a choreographer with the Royal Ballet. Keith danced in many ballets, including Miracle in the Gorbals, Madam Ogle, La Boutique Fantasque, Antigone, Persephone, Ondine, Romeo and Juliet, Daphnis and Chloe, Sleeping Beauty, Petrushka, "Silvia", Swan Lake, Capalia, Jobe, The Rite of Spring, La Fille Mal Gardee, The Firebird, and Le Baiser De La Fee.

== Military service ==
His ballet career was disrupted in 1952, when Madam De Valois—responding to an accusation that Royal Ballet dancers were not being called up for the military—volunteered McMillan, John Sail, and others. McMillan spent two years in the Royal Army Medical Corps at Tidworth—and later at Didcot, where he ran an MRS for soldiers injured in the Korean War.

== Photography career ==
Keith's second love, photography was encouraged by Dame Margot. He photographed her with Rudolph Nureyev, Sir Robert Helpmann, and many others. Through this association he met and befriended Tony Armstrong-Jones (Lord Snowdon). This introduction led to McMillan presenting his photographs to The Sunday Times, which commissioned him to photograph theatrical and ballet stars. His first commission was to photograph Rudolph Nureyev.

From 1965 to 1997 he worked for many magazines. On 27 April 1968, he photographed the Queen and her family on her birthday for the Illustrated London News front page. Other magazines he shot for during this time include Avenue, The Dancing Times, London Life, Harpers Bazaar, Harpers & Queen, Vogue, Direct Response, Apple Computers, Time Out, Radio Times, Lion News, Daily Express, The Viewer, Envoy, Accountancy Age, RIBA Journal, Intercity Magazine, and Dobell’s Record Sleeves.

During this time he was sent to Europe and the US to photograph many famous people—including Tom Jones, Sir Keith Richards, Roy Orbison, Mick Jagger, John Lennon, Yoko Ono, Henry Moore, and Man Ray.

McMillan joined Haymarket Publications in 1972 under Michael Heseltine, who had started an advertising industry magazine called Campaign. McMillan was the magazine's first photographer. He developed his own style of corporate photography, and worked for 26 years as Campaign's chief photographer. The magazine still uses his photos today.

Through commissions and other assignments, he met many luminaries in the advertising industry and attended the Advertising Industries Award Festival at Cannes. Charles Saatchi and Maurice Saatchi commissioned him to photograph themselves and their famous parties. He was recognised as the corporate photographer, and photographed all the British Prime Ministers and Blue Chip industry CEO's, plus many artists.

== The artist ==
From an early age, McMillan discovered he had artistic ability—sketching abstract dancers and scenes for the ballets he danced in. He commenced his 'discovery of art' in the 1950s, and was always fascinated with the world of the great artists who lived and painted in the 1920s. He loved art deco, and the modern painting made famous by Pablo Picasso, Henri Matisse, Edvard Munch, Gustav Klimt, Egon Schiele, and Bauhaus design.

McMillan studied Art at Bromley University. He learned welding to make sculptures at Greenwich. His first trip to Australia in 1993 with his partner Janece Hemensley introduced him to a new range of shapes and colours as he travelled to various parts of Australia. He was looking for somewhere to settle and commence painting seriously to create his own style. He continually photographed landscapes, trees, plants, animals, and everything that made Australia his home.

He developed a style he called "sensoryperceivism". He completed a number of Australian landscapes that he displayed in his studio just outside Ravenshoe. McMillan also enjoyed painting portraits, and accepted commissions.

He held his first Australian solo exhibition, Insight, at the Atherton, Queensland, for the month of August 2004. The show presented a cross section of his work and styles—including landscapes, portraits, abstracts, and collage. In April 2005, he exhibited at the Old Post Office Gallery at Atherton. This time, he called the exhibition Aberration, and showed mainly new works that included a series on Ronny McDonald, a subject close to his heart. He was an avid toy collector. In May 2005, his work was featured at Joe's Place on Main Street, Atherton.

Cairns residents viewed his work at Northern Interiors and Fusions on Grafton St. Deanne Derrington commissioned him to paint a large piece for the "Tree Tops Resort" at Port Douglas, for a reception. An exhibition of his work called Incandescent took place at The Cell art space on Grafton Street, the Ergon building, from 19 October 2005 for four weeks. Kick Art and Cairns Regional Gallery hold an annual postcard exhibition, exhibiting and auctioning his work; they featured his entry on their invitations for 2 years.

Gallery 53 on Spence Street Cairns invited McMillan to exhibit some of his photographs in conjunction with their photographic competition, In The Raw, held 10 March – 10 April 2006. McMillan judged the competition. Cairns Regional Gallery Presented an exhibition of his photographs on 28 March to 4 May 2008 titled "Time and A Place".

== Personal life ==
McMillan lived and worked in London until 1997 when he emigrated to Australia in September of that year, married Janece his partner of 9 years in December 1999, lived and painted at his studio on the Ravenshoe Tablelands, enjoying time off at his Cairns residence. He was diagnosed with cancer in January 2010 and died in March 2012, after which his widow Janece McMillan sold his art privately and following an exhibition at Artworld Gallery Cairns. He had two children: Alexandra McMillan, who was named after his best friend, Alexander Grant OBE, and Linnet Stembridge, and 2 grandchildren, Veronique and Alexandra. Alexandra has followed in her grandfather's footsteps and is a ballet dancer.
