= Steve Holley =

British drummer (born 1953)

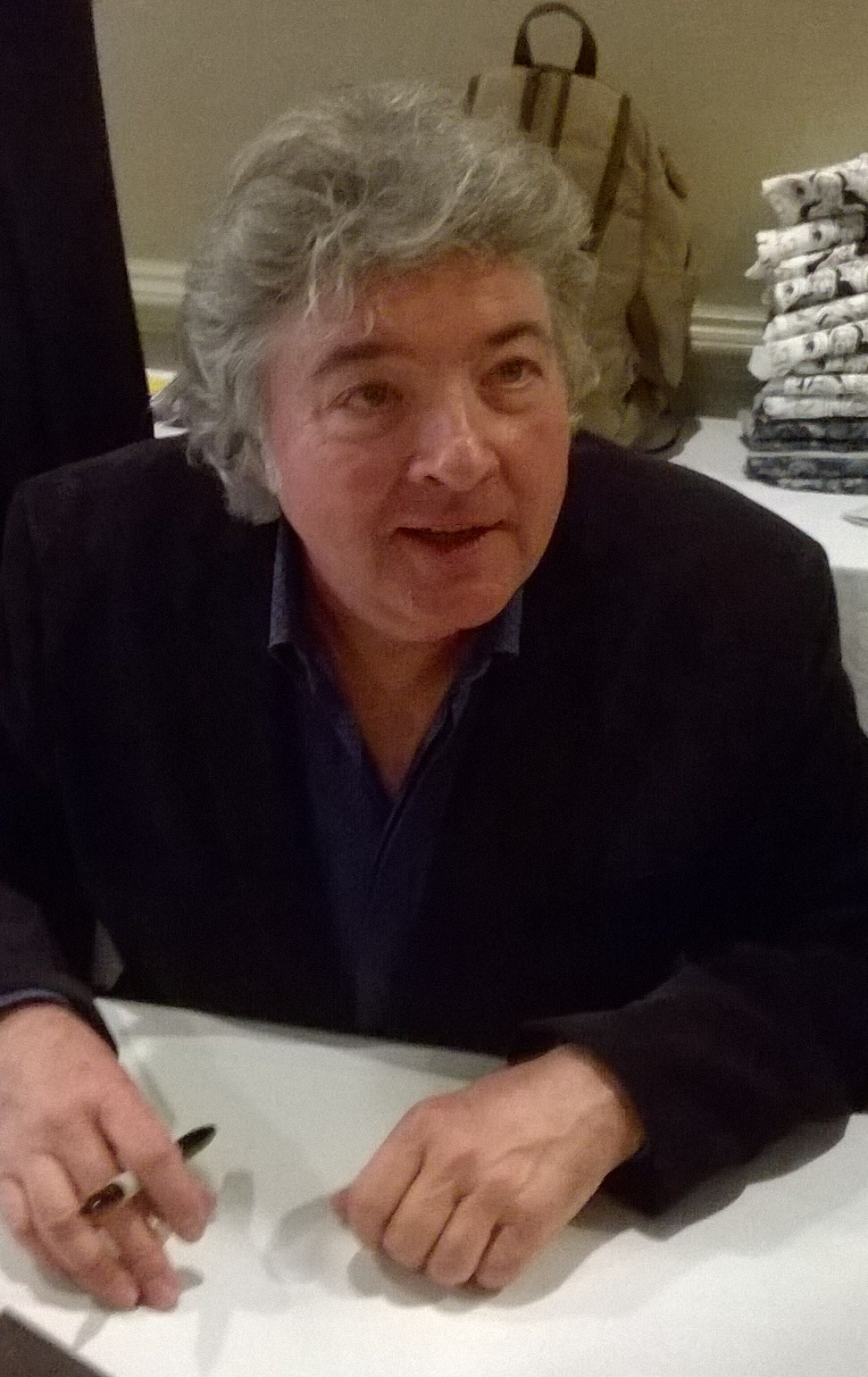
- Holley in 2016

Background information
- Born: Stephen Jeffrey Holley; 24 August 1953 (age 73); London, England
- Origin: Chiswick, London, England
- Genres: Rock
- Instrument: Drummer
- Years active: 1978–present
- Formerly of: Paul McCartney and Wings; Mott the Hoople

Stephen Jeffrey Holley (born 24 August 1953) is an English rock drummer. He was a member of Wings from August 1978 to April 1981. In 1984 he played drums and percussion on Julian Lennon's debut album Valotte. He has also toured with Ian Hunter, on drums and backing vocals, including a reunion tour with Mott the Hoople in 2018 and 2019.

== Early life ==
Holley was born in London. His father, Jeffrey, led a swing music band, and his mother, Irene, was the singer. Holley first studied the piano, but took up the drums at the age of twelve.

== Career ==
In the course of his career, dating back to 1970 and an album with the band Horse, and including numerous appearances as a session musician, he performed and recorded with Paul McCartney, Elton John, Kiki Dee, G.T. Moore & The Reggae Guitars, Joe Cocker, Ian Hunter, Tommy Shaw, Julian Lennon, Dar Williams, Richard Barone, Ben E. King, and Chuck Berry. In 1978, soon after performing on Elton John's hit single "Ego", a chance meeting in a pub in his hometown of Staines with Denny Laine resulted in him being invited to join Wings. Holley later was a member of Jules Shear's band, Reckless Sleepers.

Holley has been touring with Ian Hunter for several years as a member of Ian Hunter's Rant Band. He plays Pearl drums and Sabian cymbals.

In 1993, Holley contributed to Warren Haynes's album, 'Tales of Ordinary Madness' and toured with him to promote the album.

== Discography ==
- The Reluctant Dog (2003)

== Collaborations ==
- A Single Man – Elton John (1978)
- Vapour Trails – Vapour Trails (1979)
- Back to the Egg – Paul McCartney and Wings (1979)
- Jump Up – Elton John (1982)
- Valotte – Julian Lennon (1984)
- No Sound But a Heart – Sheena Easton (1987)
- Night Calls – Joe Cocker (1991)
