= Estes =

Estes is an English surname derived from the Middle English word est, meaning "east".

Notable people with the name include:

== Surname ==
- Addie Garwood Estes, American temperance activist
- Billie Sol Estes, Texas businessman and politician
- Bob Estes, American professional golf player
- Eleanor Estes, American children's author
- James A. Estes, American ecologist
- Jim Estes, American golfer
- Joey Estes, American baseball player
- John Estes, American football player
- John Adam Estes, also known as "Sleepy John" Estes, American blues musician
- Patrick Estes, American football player
- Rice Estes, American librarian
- Richard Estes, American photorealist painter
- Richard Dean Estes, paleoherpetologist
- Richard Despard Estes, American biologist
- Rob Estes, American actor
- Ron Estes, American congressman from Kansas
- Shawn Estes, American Major League Baseball player
- Simon Estes, American bass-baritone singer
- Vernon Estes, American businessman
- Wayne Estes, American basketball player
- Will Estes, American actor
- William Kaye Estes, American mathematical psychologist
- W.W. Estes, American businessman and farmer
- Yusuf Estes, American minister

== Given name ==
- Estes Banks, American football player
- Estes Kefauver, American politician
- Estes Parham, American basketball player

== See also ==
- Estes, a support hero in the video game Mobile Legends: Bang Bang
- Estes, Missouri
- Estes, Virginia
- Estes Park, a town in Colorado, U.S.
- Estes Express Lines, United States shipping company founded by W.W. Estes in 1931
- Estes Industries, U.S. company specializing in model aircraft and model rockets
- USS Estes (AGC-12), U.S. Navy
