= Niccolò d'Este =

Niccolò d'Este may refer to:

- Niccolò I d'Este, Marquis of Ferrara (died 1344), see Duke of Ferrara and of Modena
- Niccolò II d'Este, Marquis of Ferrara (1338–1388)
- Niccolò III d'Este, Marquis of Ferrara (1383–1441)
- Niccolò d'Este (1438–1476), also called Niccolò di Leonello, grandson of Niccolò III and son of Leonello d'Este, Marquis of Ferrara

== See also ==
- House of Este
- Niccolò (name)
- Este (disambiguation)
