= Este =

Este may refer to:

== Geography ==
- Este (woreda), a district in Ethiopia
- Este, Veneto, a town in Italy
- Este (Málaga), a district in Spain
- Este (river), a river in Germany
- Este (São Pedro), a parish in Portugal
- Este (São Mamede), a parish in Portugal

== People ==
- House of Este, a European dynasty
- Dukes of Ferrara and of Modena, the Italian family of Este
- Este culture, a proto-historic culture existed from the late Italian Bronze Age
- Aquiles Este (born 1962), American semiotician
- Charles Este (1696–1745), bishop of Ossory and Waterford and Lismore
- Florence Esté (1860–1926), American painter
- Este Haim (born 1986), American musician

== Other uses ==
- A.C. Este, an association football club based in Este, Veneto
- Estë, a fictional character in J. R. R. Tolkien's legendarium
- The Villa d'Este in Tivoli, Italy, with its palace and garden, is one of the most remarkable and comprehensive illustrations of Renaissance culture at its most refined. It has been listed as a UNESCO World Heritage Site in 2001.

== See also ==
- East (disambiguation)
- Estes, a surname
