= Francis Burgess (musician and priest) =

British proponent of plainsong in Anglican church

Francis Henry Burgess (1879-1948) was a leading British proponent of the use of plainsong in Anglican church music. He was born in Marylebone, London. From sometime before 1916 until at least 1921 Burgess lived at 27 Lechmere Road, Willesden Green, London.

== Personal life ==
- In 1906 he married Mabel Thistleton at St Columb's church, Notting Hill, London. Together they had a daughter Mabel Charlotte.
- In 1917 for several months he worked at the Royal Navy shore establishment HMS President II.
- In 1946 he married Freda Bartlett and together they had a son Arthur.

== Career ==
=== Musician ===
- 1900:
  - Organist, St. Mary the Virgin, Primrose Hill, London, under the aegis of Percy Dearmer.
- 1902:
  - Organist, St Mark's, Old Marylebone Road. In January 1904, while still at St Mark's, he was made a Fellow of the Guild of Church Musicians during the Guild's annual banquet.
- 1904
  - Organist, St. Columb's, North Kensington. He was still in post there in 1921.
- 1910
  - In 1910 Francis Burgess was elected as the musical director of the Gregorian Association (founded in 1870), a role he kept for thirty-eight years. He became well-known as one of the leading Anglican authorities on plainchant. His liturgical settings of plainchant are still used widely. He published several books on the subject of plainchant.
- 1912
  - By 1912 he was a Fellow of the Society of Antiquaries of Scotland (F.S.A (Scot)).

At some time later Burgess held the post of organist at: St Osmond's Parkstone, Dorset.

=== Priest ===
In 1942 he began training for the Anglican priesthood at the Wells Theological College, Somerset, and Bishop's College, Cheshunt, Hertfordshire. In 1946 he was ordained deacon and then priest. He served at: St. John the Baptist Church. Eastover, Bridgwater, 1944–45; St. Andrew's, Taunton, 1945–46: and 1945-48 Stokenham with Sherrord.

In April 1948 Burgess was appointed to the Living of Woolsery on the patronage of the Society for the Maintenance of the Faith. He was taken ill and died just days before his induction. He was buried at St. Andrew's churchyard, Yetminster, Dorset

== Works ==
- 1904:
  - Altar music : a supplement to Provost Staley's Altar Service Book, containing the priest's part, together with rules for singing the collects, epistles, and gospels according to the old English usage, as well as that of the Missale Romanum / / edited by Francis Burgess.
  - Goodwill music : a collection of hymns and tunes, together with a number of alternative tunes to hymns already contained in "Hymns ancient and modern".
  - The litany and suffrages from the Book of Common Prayer : with the music from the Sarum processional / organ accompaniment by Francis Burgess.
- 1905
  - Night at the Opera: Bizet's Carmen.
  - The office for the dead / set to its ancient music by Francis Burgess.
- 1906
  - Night at the Opera: Verdi's Il trovatore.
  - Night at the Opera: Verdi's Rigoletto.
- 1908
  - The organ of fifty years hence : a study gathered from its past history and present tendencies.
- 1913
  - Benedictus set to the Seventh Gregorian Tone with verses in Faux-bourdon by T. Tallis ... Edited by F. Burgess and R. Shore.
  - Magnificat and Nunc dimittis (No.1) set to Gregorian tones with faux-bourdons by L. Viadana; edited by Francis Burgess.
  - Magnificat and Nunc dimittis (No. 2) set to Gregorian tones / with verses in faux-Bourdon by Thomas Tomkins; edited by Francis Burgess and Royle Shore.
  - Magnificat and Nunc dimittis : (no. 3) set to Gregorian tones : with verses in faux-bourdon / by John Holmes; edited by Francis Burgess and Royle Shore.
  - Magnificat and Nunc dimittis (No.4) set to Gregorian tones with verses in faux-bourdon by T. Morley. / [For S.A.T.B.]; edited by F. Burgess and R. Shore.
  - Magnificat and Nunc dimittis (no. 5) set to Gregorian tones / with verses in faux-bourdon by William Byrd (c. 1543-1623); edited by Francis Burgess and Royle Shore.
  - Magnificat and Nunc dimittis (no.6) set to Gregorian tones, with verses in Faux-bourdon / by Orlando Gibbons; edited by Francis Burgess and Royle Shore.
  - Magnificat and Nunc dimittis (no. 7) set to Gregorian tones, with verses in faux-bourdon by William Whitbroke and Knight. Ed. by Francis Burgess and Royle Shore.
  - Magnificat and Nunc dimittis (No. 8) set to Gregorian tones with verses in faux-bourdon / by an unknown Edwardine composer (1547) and Thomas Causton (d. 1569); edited by Francis Burgess and Royle Shore.
  - Night at the Opera: Mozart's Don Giovanni.
- 1914
  - The teaching and accompaniment of plainsong (Handbooks for musicians).
- 1917
  - The Music of the Serbian Liturgy, arranged for the English Rite; w Voyeslav Yanitch.
- 1920
  - The anthems of the Blessed Virgin Mary.
  - The Fa-Burden Chant Book for use with the Gregorian Tones. Edited by G. Sceats and F. Burgess.
  - The English gradual : Part 1, the plainchant of the ordinary / edited by Francis Burgess. 2nd ed.
- 1922
  - The plainchant of the Missal. part I. The music of Holy week / edited by Francis Burgess.
- 1924
  - An English benediction manual.
  - An English kyriale : (ninefold settings).
  - Casciolini's Missa Brevissima.
  - Good Friday tenebrae.
  - Holy Saturday tenebrae.
  - Maundy Thursday tenebrae.
  - Missa pro defunctis : (in simple plainchant).
  - Solemn reception of a bishop
  - Vespers of the dead.
  - Sunday compline.
- 1930
  - The English gradual / Part 2, The Proper for the liturgical year. edited by Francis Burgess.
  - Mass responses; Office responses.
- 1933
  - The Tenor Tonale for use with the Gregorian Tones. Edited by F. Burgess.
- 1935
  - A Liturgical Anthem Book. Edited by F. Burgess.
- 1936
  - The ritual music of the prefaces : according to the rite of 1662 with other eucharistic intonations and inflexions and the rules for chanting the collects, epistles & gospels; with sarum note / edited by Francis Burgess.
  - The Sarum chant for the solemn singing of the passion of Our Lord on Palm Sunday and Good Friday: from manuscripts at Salisbury & Lambeth : set to the texts of the Rite of 1662 / by Francis Burgess.
- 1946
  - Plainchant evening psalter and canticles / Ed. by F. Burgess. 4th ed.
  - The Plainchant Gradual. Edited by Francis Burgess. (and R.L. Shields).
