= Personal relationships of Paul McCartney =

Engagements and marriages of the English musician

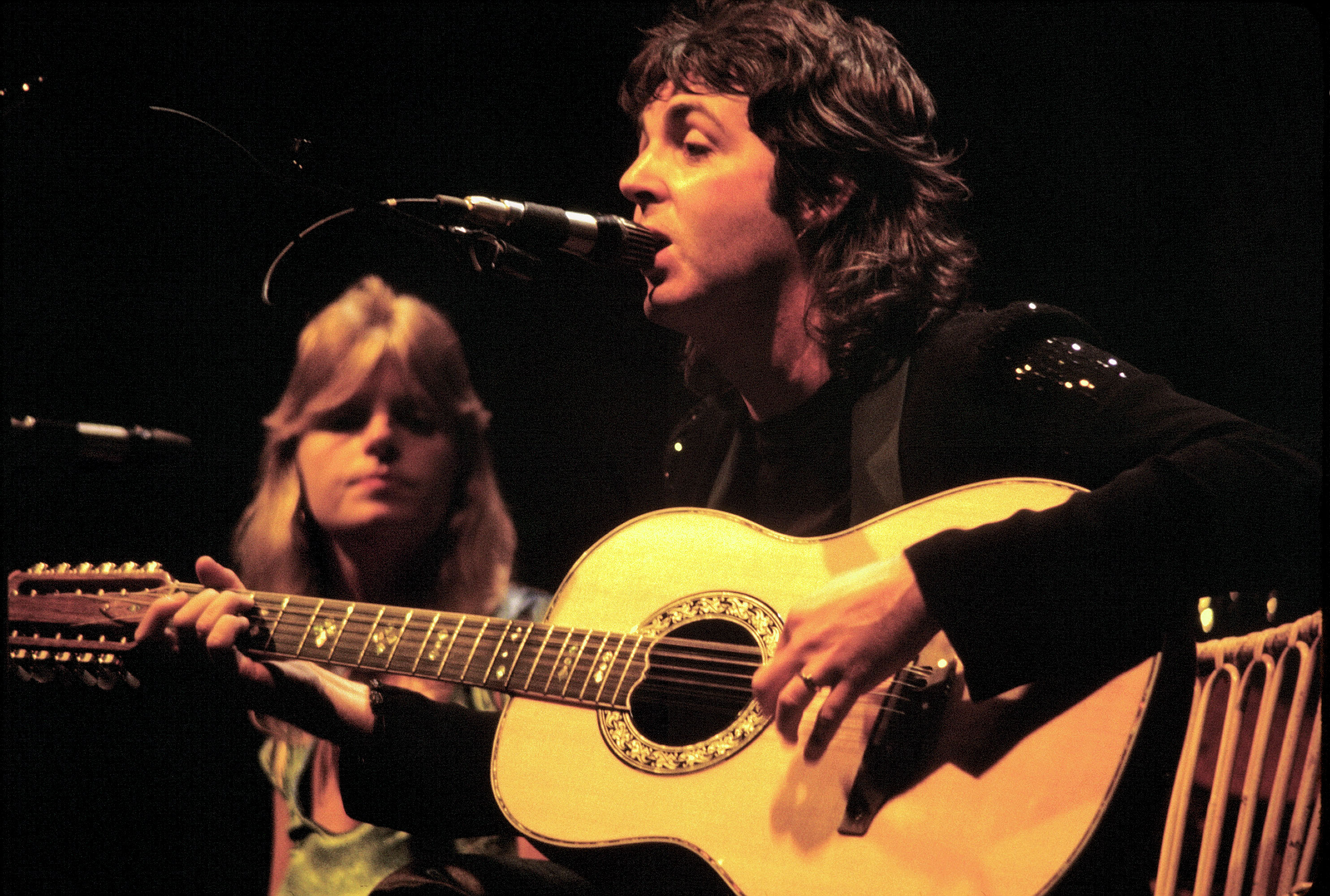
Paul McCartney performing in 1976 with his first wife Linda

The relationships of the English musician Paul McCartney include engagements to Dot Rhone and actress Jane Asher, and marriages to Linda Eastman, Heather Mills, and Nancy Shevell.

McCartney had a three-year relationship with Dot Rhone in Liverpool, and bought her a gold ring in Hamburg after she became pregnant in 1960 and they were to be married. However, she miscarried and they did not marry, but stayed together until the autumn of 1962. In London, McCartney had a five-year relationship with Jane Asher after they met in April 1963 and lived in her parents' house for three years. He wrote several songs at the Ashers' house, including "Yesterday". Asher inspired other songs, such as "And I Love Her", "You Won't See Me", and "I'm Looking Through You". On 25 December 1967, they announced their engagement, but they separated in July 1968.

McCartney met the American photographer Linda Eastman in The Bag O'Nails club in London on 15 May 1967, while still with Asher. They met again at the launch party for the Beatles' Sgt. Pepper's Lonely Hearts Club Band on 19 May 1967. In May 1968, McCartney met Eastman again in New York, and they were married on 12 March 1969. They had three children together and remained married until her death from breast cancer in 1998.

McCartney appeared publicly beside Heather Mills at a party in January 2000 to celebrate her 32nd birthday. On 11 June 2002, they were married at Castle Leslie in Glaslough, Ireland. They had one child, Beatrice, in 2003 but were living apart by May 2006. In July 2006, British newspapers announced that McCartney had petitioned for divorce. On 17 March 2008, the financial terms of the divorce were finalised, which awarded Mills £24.3 million ($38.5 million). In November 2007, McCartney started dating Nancy Shevell, who was a member of the board of the New York Metropolitan Transportation Authority and vice president of the family owned New England Motor Freight. It was announced on 6 May 2011, that the two had become engaged, and they married in London on 9 October 2011.

== Jim McCartney ==
Jim McCartney encouraged his son Paul to play the family piano on which the boy wrote "When I'm Sixty-Four". Jim advised Paul to take some music lessons, which he did, but soon realised that he preferred to learn 'by ear' (as his father had done) and because he never paid attention in music classes. After Paul and his brother Michael (stage name Mike McGear) became interested in music, Jim connected the radio in the living room to extension cords connected to two pairs of Bakelite headphones so that they could listen to Radio Luxembourg at night when they were in bed.

After first meeting John Lennon, Jim warned Paul that John would get him "into trouble", although he later allowed the Quarrymen to rehearse in the dining room at Forthlin Road in the evenings. Jim was reluctant to let the teenage Paul go to Hamburg with the Beatles until Paul said the group would earn £15 per week each (equivalent to £300 in 2025). As this was more than he earned himself, Jim finally agreed, but only after a visit from the group's then-manager, Allan Williams, who said that Jim should not worry. Bill Harry recalled that Jim was probably "the Beatles' biggest fan", and was extremely proud of Paul's success. Shelagh Johnson—later to become director of the Beatles' Museum in Liverpool—said that Jim's outward show of pride embarrassed his son. Jim enlisted Michael's help when sorting through the ever-increasing sacks of fan letters that were delivered to Forthlin Road, with both composing "personal" responses that were supposedly from Paul. Michael later succeeded on his own with the group the Scaffold.

== Jim, Angie and Ruth McCartney ==
In 1963, a family friend introduced Jim to a young widow, Angie, and her infant daughter Ruth. He soon proposed marriage and Angie readily accepted. Paul, who was in London at the time, was informed by telephone of her acceptance and a few hours later he arrived at the Cheshire home he had given to his father. He and his brother Michael both approved of their future stepmother and they soon got married over the border in Wales in 1964. Jim went on to adopt Ruth.

Twelve years later on 18 March 1976, Jim (whose health had recently deteriorated) died while Paul and Linda were performing abroad with Wings; they decided not to attend the family funeral, which kept Jim's death and funeral away from the media. Angie moved to London and, after a failed business attempt, moved with Ruth to Playa del Rey, Los Angeles in 1990, where they started a successful website design venture and tea and wine companies.

=== Songs ===
Paul wrote "I Lost My Little Girl" just after Mary had died, and explained that it was a subconscious reference to his late mother. He has speculated that he subconsciously wrote the song "Yesterday" about his mother as well. He also wrote "Golden Slumbers" at his father's house in Heswall, and said the lyrics were taken from Ruth McCartney's sheet-music copy of Thomas Dekker's lullaby—also called "Golden Slumbers"—that Ruth had left on the piano at Rembrandt. Hunter Davies, who was at Jim's house at the time doing an interview for his Beatles' biography, remembered Jim listening to an acetate disc of "When I'm Sixty-Four". Davies wrote that Paul originally wrote the song specifically for his younger father and then recorded it, as Jim was by then 64 years old and had remarried two years previously. Paul wrote "Let It Be" after a dream he had in 1968. He said that he had dreamt of his mother, and the "Mother Mary" lyric was about her. He later said, "It was great to visit with her again. I felt very blessed to have that dream. So that got me writing 'Let It Be'."

In 1974, Paul recorded a song his father had previously written, entitled "Walking in the Park with Eloise", which was released by Wings under the pseudonym, "The Country Hams". The Country Hams' single was backed with a tune entitled "Bridge on the River Suite". Both songs can be found on the CD Venus and Mars from The Paul McCartney Collection.

== Early relationships ==
One of McCartney's first girlfriends, in 1957, was called Layla, a name he remembered as being unusual in Liverpool at the time. She was slightly older than McCartney and used to ask him to baby-sit with her. Julie Arthur, another girlfriend, was Ted Ray's niece.

McCartney's first serious girlfriend in Liverpool was seventeen-year-old Dorothy "Dot" Rhone (a bank clerk or a cashier at a chemist's, according to varying accounts), whom he had met at The Casbah Club in 1959. McCartney picked out the clothes he liked Rhone to wear and told her which make-up to use, also paying for her to have her blonde hair done in the style of Brigitte Bardot, whom both he and John Lennon idolised. He disliked Rhone seeing her friends, and stopped her from smoking, even though he did so himself. When McCartney first went to Hamburg with The Beatles, he wrote regular letters to Rhone, and she accompanied Lennon's girlfriend, Cynthia Powell, to Hamburg when the group played there again in 1962. According to Rhone, McCartney bought her a gold ring in Hamburg, a leather skirt, took her sightseeing, and was very attentive and caring. For the time Rhone was there, the couple lived in a bungalow by the Hamburg docks that belonged to Rosa, a former cleaner at the Indra club. McCartney admitted that he had other girlfriends in Hamburg when Rhone was in Liverpool, admitting that they were usually strippers, who knew a lot more about sex than Liverpool girls.

Rhone later rented a room in the same house Cynthia Lennon was living in, with McCartney contributing to the rent. According to Mark Lewisohn's biography Tune In, Dot became pregnant in 1960, and Paul's father, Jim, while being shocked, was nonetheless rather pleased at the prospect of becoming a grandfather. Jim insisted that his grandson be kept with the family and not given up for adoption. They were to be married soon, but Dot had a miscarriage. She still wore the ring he gave her, and they stayed together until the autumn of 1962 when Paul broke up with her, knowing she would eventually want to get married (John and Cynthia had recently married in August 1962 due to Cynthia's pregnancy), and he did not want to marry anyone at the time because he was still only 20 years old.

He then had a brief relationship with Thelma Pickles, who had previously dated Lennon. She later married Liverpool poet Roger McGough, but she remembered McCartney as growing from a "plump young schoolboy into someone very much his own person" during their time together. McCartney also had a fiery on–off relationship with Iris Caldwell, the younger sister of singer Rory Storm, who refused to bow to McCartney's demands. After one argument, Caldwell poured a bowl of sugar over his head, but when McCartney turned up the next day, she had to phone her new boyfriend, George Harrison, to cancel their date.

Rhone later emigrated to Toronto, Canada, and McCartney met her again when the Beatles played there, and then again with Wings. Rhone later said that "Love of the Loved" and "P.S. I Love You" were written about her. Years later, Cynthia Lennon gave Rhone the gold ring that McCartney had bought Rhone, having once tried it on while Rhone was washing dishes, and forgotten to take it off. Rhone was, in 2011, a grandmother and lived in Mississauga, Ontario.

== Engagement to Jane Asher ==
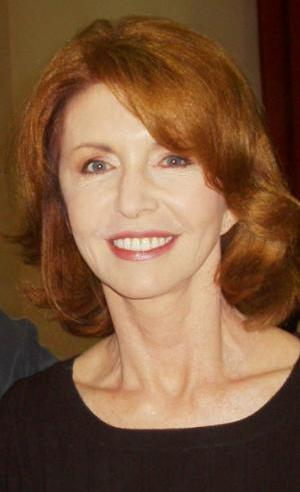
Asher during filming of the Maestro TV series in 2008

McCartney first met British actress Jane Asher on 18 April 1963 when the Beatles performed at the Royal Albert Hall, in London, after a photographer asked them to pose with her. They were then interviewed by Asher for the BBC, with Asher being photographed screaming at them like a fan. McCartney soon met Asher's family: Margaret, her mother, was a music teacher, and Asher's father Richard was a physician. Her brother, Peter, was a member of the pop duo Peter and Gordon, and her younger sister, Clare, was also an actress. McCartney later gave "A World Without Love" to Peter and Gordon, as well as "Nobody I Know". Both songs were hits for the duo. McCartney took up residence at the Ashers' house at 57 Wimpole Street, London, and lived there for nearly three years. During his time there McCartney met writers such as Bertrand Russell, Harold Pinter, and Len Deighton. He wrote several songs at the Ashers', including "Yesterday", and worked on songs with Lennon in the basement music room. Asher inspired many songs, such as "And I Love Her", "You Won't See Me", and "I'm Looking Through You".

On 13 April 1965, McCartney bought a £40,000 three-storey Regency house at 7 Cavendish Avenue, St John's Wood, London, and spent a further £20,000 renovating it. He thanked the Ashers by paying for the decoration of the front of their house. On 15 May 1967, McCartney met American photographer Linda Eastman at a Georgie Fame concert at The Bag O'Nails in London. Eastman was in the UK on an assignment to take photographs of "swinging sixties" musicians in London. They met again four days later at the launch party for the Sgt. Pepper album at Beatles' manager Brian Epstein's house in Belgravia, but after her assignment was completed, she flew back to New York. On 25 December 1967, McCartney and Asher announced their engagement, and she accompanied McCartney to India in February and March 1968.

Asher broke off the engagement in the summer of 1968, apparently because of an alleged affair Paul was having with artist Francie Schwartz. McCartney and Asher later attempted to mend their relationship, but finally broke up in July 1968. Asher has consistently refused to publicly discuss that part of her life.

== Marriage to Linda Eastman ==
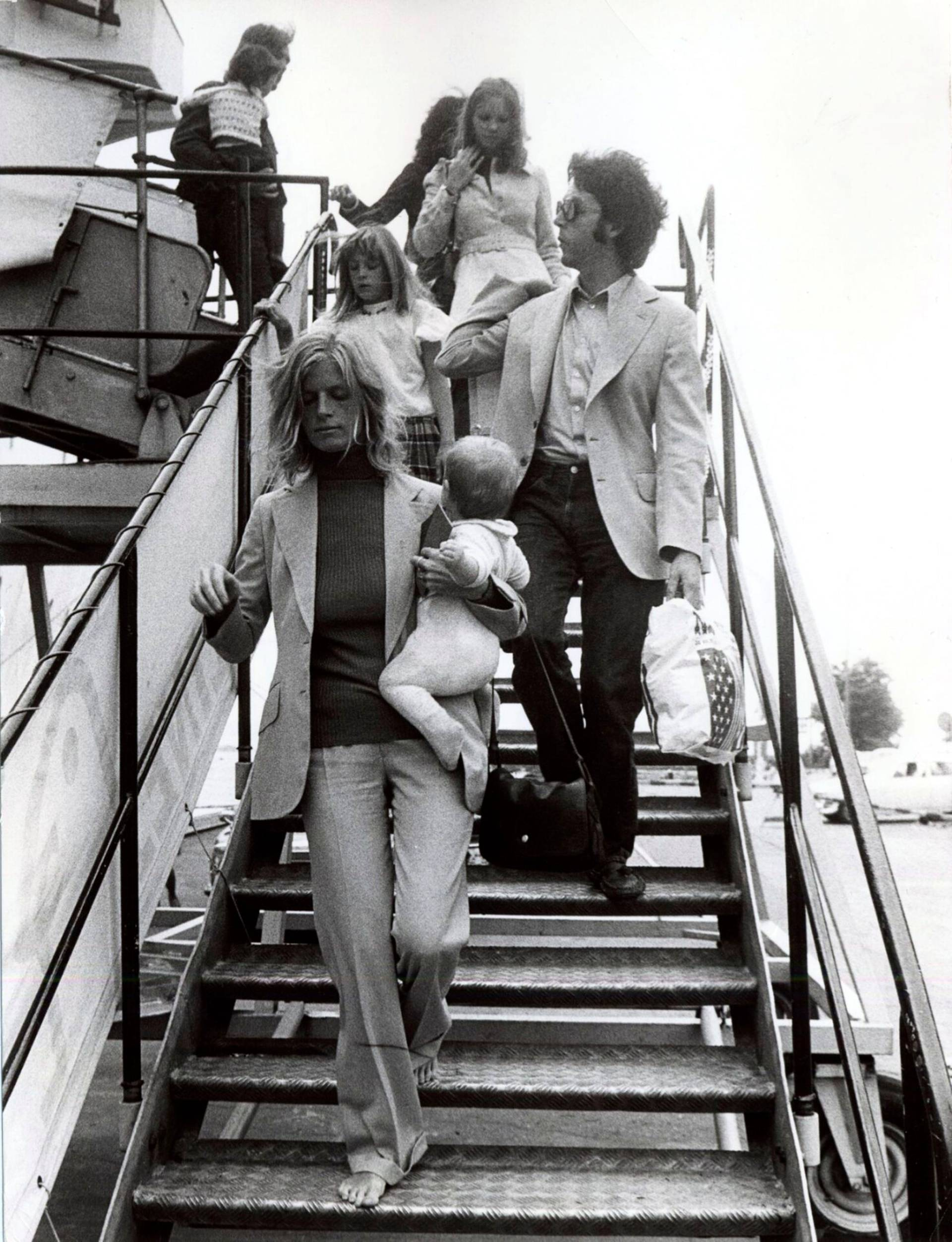
Paul and Linda McCartney in 1972, with Linda carrying their daughter Stella

Linda Eastman was a music fan who once commented, "all my teen years were spent with an ear to the radio." At times, she skipped school to see artists such as Fabian, Bobby Darin, and Chuck Berry. She became a popular photographer with several rock groups, including the Jimi Hendrix Experience, the Grateful Dead, the Doors, and the Beatles, whom she first met at Shea Stadium in New York City in 1966. She commented, "It was John who interested me at the start. He was my Beatle hero. But when I met him the fascination faded fast, and I found it was Paul I liked." The pair first became properly acquainted on 15 May 1967 at a Georgie Fame concert at The Bag O'Nails club, during her UK assignment to photograph rock musicians in London. As Paul remembers, "The night Linda and I met, I spotted her across a crowded club, and although I would normally have been nervous chatting her up, I realised I had to. ... Pushiness worked for me that night!"

Linda said this about their meeting: "I was quite shameless really. I was with somebody else [that night] ... and I saw Paul at the other side of the room. He looked so beautiful that I made up my mind I would have to pick him up." The pair married at Marylebone Town Hall on 12 March 1969, when Eastman was four months pregnant with their child, Mary McCartney. Paul adopted Linda's daughter from her first marriage, Heather, and after Mary they had two other children together, Stella and James.

About their relationship, Paul said, "We had a lot of fun together ... just the nature of how we aren't, our favourite thing really is to just hang, to have fun. And Linda's very big on just following the moment." He added, "We were crazy. We had a big argument the night before we got married, and it was nearly called off ... [it's] miraculous that we made it. But we did." He later said that his wife was the woman who "gave me the strength and courage to work again," after the breakup of the Beatles. Paul taught Linda to play keyboards, and permanently included her in the lineup of Wings. They faced derision from some fans and critics, who questioned her inclusion. She was nervous about performing with Paul, who said, "She conquered those nerves, got on with it and was really gutsy." Paul defended her musical ability: "I taught Linda the basics of the keyboard ... She took a couple of lessons and learned some bluesy things ... she did very well and made it look easier than it was ... The critics would say, 'She's not really playing' or 'Look at her—she's playing with one finger.' But what they didn't know is that sometimes she was playing a thing called a Minimoog, which could only be played with one finger. It was monophonic."

Linda died of breast cancer at age 56 in Tucson, Arizona, on 17 April 1998; McCartney denied rumours that her death was an assisted suicide. Along with eight other British composers, he contributed to the choral album A Garland for Linda, and dedicated his classical album Ecce Cor Meum to his late wife. McCartney has said that he and Linda spent less than a week apart during their entire marriage, excluding McCartney's incarceration in Tokyo on drug charges in January 1980.

== Marriage to Heather Mills ==
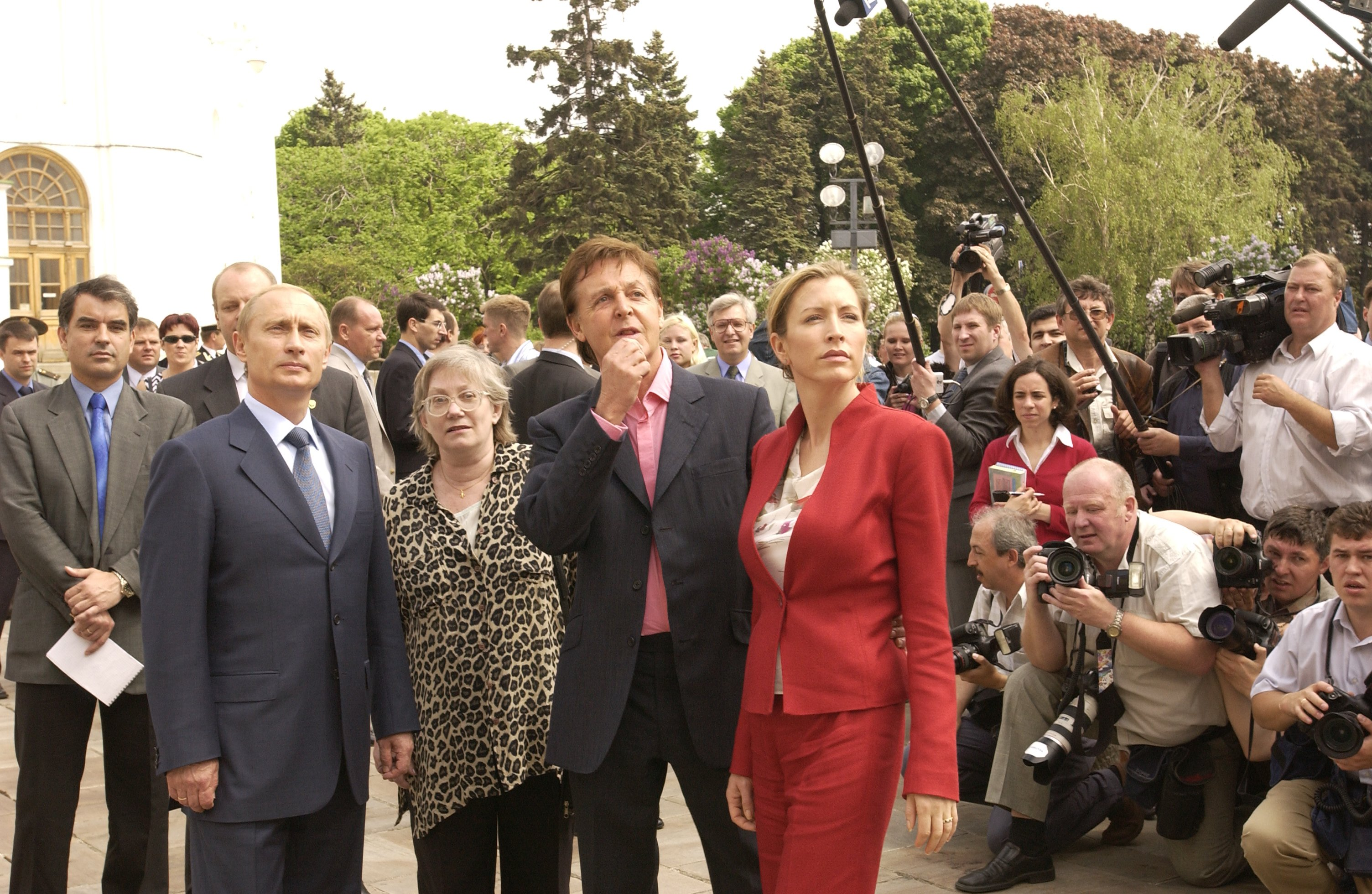
Vladimir Putin, McCartney, and Heather Mills in Moscow, 2003

After having sparked the interest of the tabloids about his appearances at events with former model, amputee, and campaigner against landmines Heather Mills, McCartney appeared publicly beside her at a party in January 2000 to celebrate her 32nd birthday. On 11 June 2002, McCartney married Mills in an elaborate ceremony at Castle Leslie in Glaslough, County Monaghan, Ireland, where more than 300 guests were invited; the reception included a vegetarian banquet. Mills gave birth to Beatrice Milly McCartney. She was reportedly named after Mills' mother Beatrice, and McCartney's Aunt Milly.

On 29 July 2006, British newspapers announced that McCartney had petitioned for divorce, which sparked a media furore. On 17 March 2008, the financial terms of the divorce were finalised, with a settlement awarding Mills £24.3 million. The settlement stated that McCartney would pay their four-year-old daughter Beatrice's nanny and school fees, as well as pay Beatrice £35,000 a year until she is 17, or until she ends her secondary education. After the divorce ruling, Justice Hugh Bennett said that, throughout the case, Mills was "inconsistent, inaccurate and less than candid" while McCartney was "honest". On 12 May 2008, Justice Bennett issued a decree nisi, which would become final after a period of six weeks.

== Marriage to Nancy Shevell ==
McCartney began dating Nancy Shevell, a former wife of New York politician Bruce Blakeman, in November 2007. Shevell is a cousin of the American journalist Barbara Walters. She was born in Edison, New Jersey, on 20 November 1959, and grew up there with her family.

She is a graduate of J. P. Stevens High School and Arizona State University, was a member of the board of the New York Metropolitan Transportation Authority as well as vice president of a family-owned transportation conglomerate that includes New England Motor Freight. She resigned from the MTA board in January 2012. It was announced on 6 May 2011 that the two had become engaged. On 9 October 2011, McCartney and Shevell were married at Marylebone Town Hall, where his first wedding took place in 1969. The couple attended Yom Kippur synagogue services prior to the wedding, out of respect for Shevell's Jewish faith, but did not seek a religious blessing for their union. Upon their marriage, Shevell became Lady McCartney. McCartney wrote the song "My Valentine", from his 2012 album Kisses on the Bottom, about Shevell.

== Relationships with the other Beatles ==
=== John Lennon ===
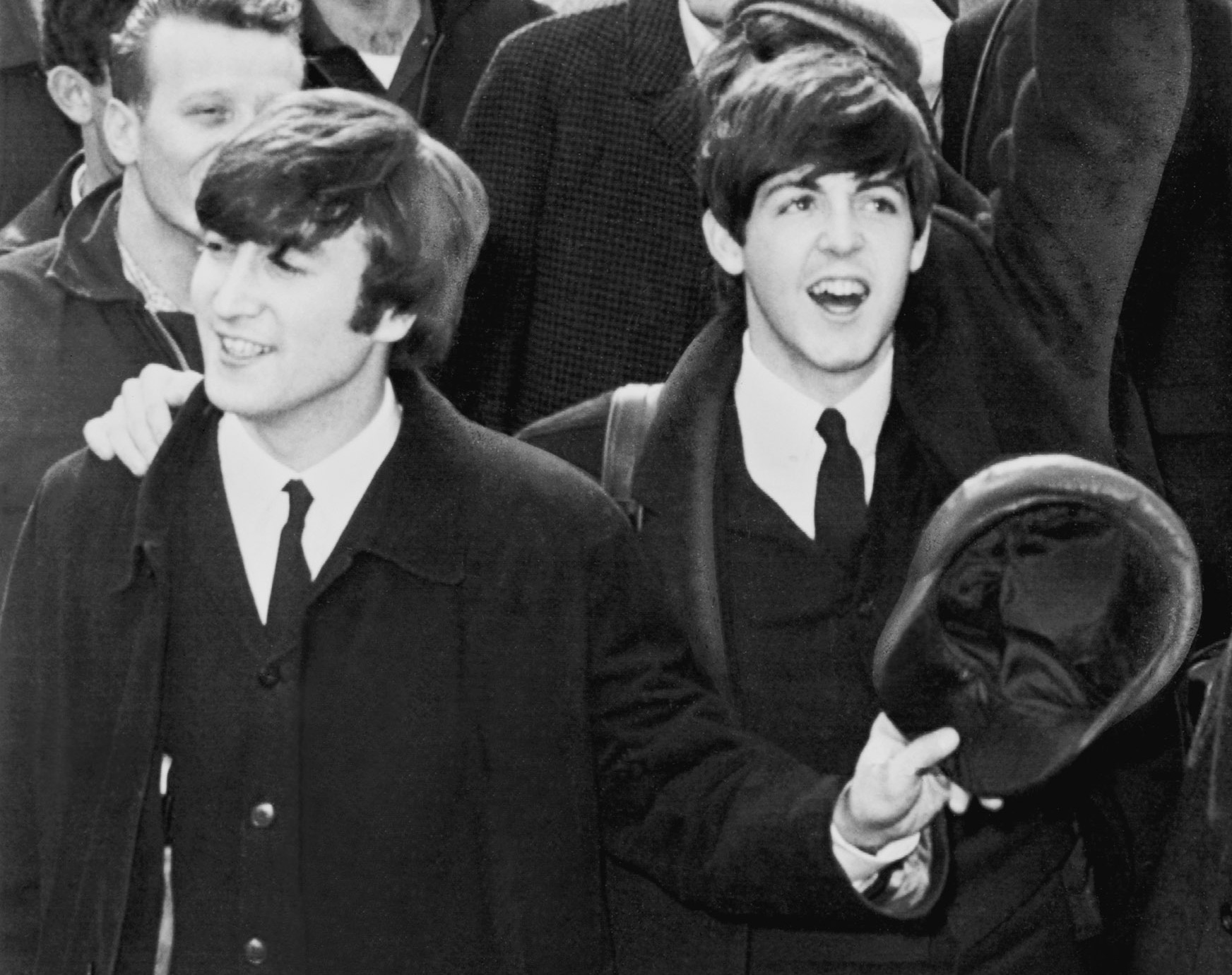
McCartney with John Lennon in 1964

Though McCartney had a strained relationship with Lennon post-Beatles, they briefly became close again in early 1974, and played music together on one occasion. In later years, the two grew apart. McCartney often phoned Lennon, but was apprehensive about the reception he would receive. During one call, Lennon told him, "You're all pizza and fairytales!" In an effort to avoid talking only about business, they often spoke of cats, babies, or baking bread.

On 24 April 1976, McCartney and Lennon were watching an episode of Saturday Night Live at Lennon's home in the Dakota when Lorne Michaels made a $3,000 cash offer for the Beatles to reunite. While they seriously considered going to the SNL studio a few blocks away, they decided it was too late. This was their last time together. VH1 fictionalised this event in the 2000 television film Two of Us. McCartney's last telephone call to Lennon, days before Lennon and Ono released Double Fantasy, was friendly: "[It is] a consoling factor for me, because I do feel it was sad that we never actually sat down and straightened our differences out. But fortunately for me, the last phone conversation I ever had with him was really great, and we didn't have any kind of blow-up", he said.

==== Reaction to Lennon's murder ====
John is kinda like a constant ... always there in my being ... in my soul, so I always think of him.

— McCartney, Guitar World, January 2000

On 9 December 1980, McCartney followed the news that Lennon had been murdered the previous night; Lennon's death created a media frenzy around the surviving members of the band. McCartney was leaving an Oxford Street recording studio that evening when he was surrounded by reporters who asked him for his reaction; he responded: "It's a drag". The press quickly criticised him for what appeared to be a superficial response. He later explained, "When John was killed somebody stuck a microphone at me and said: 'What do you think about it?' I said, 'It's a dra-a-ag' and meant it with every inch of melancholy I could muster. When you put that in print it says, 'McCartney in London today when asked for a comment on his dead friend said, "It's a drag".' It seemed a very flippant comment to make." He described his first exchange with Ono after the murder, and his last conversation with Lennon:

I talked to Yoko the day after he was killed, and the first thing she said was, "John was really fond of you." The last telephone conversation I had with him we were still the best of mates. He was always a very warm guy, John. His bluff was all on the surface. He used to take his glasses down, those granny glasses, and say, "it's only me." They were like a wall you know? A shield. Those are the moments I treasure.

In 1983, McCartney said: "I would not have been as typically human and standoffish as I was if I knew John was going to die. I would have made more of an effort to try and get behind his 'mask' and have a better relationship with him." He said that he went home that night, watched the news on television with his children and cried most of the evening. In 1997, he said that Lennon's death made the remaining ex-Beatles nervous that they might also be murdered. He told Mojo in 2002 that Lennon was his greatest hero. In 1981, McCartney sang backup on Harrison's tribute to Lennon, "All Those Years Ago", which featured Starr on drums. McCartney released "Here Today" in 1982, a song Everett described as "a haunting tribute" to McCartney's friendship with Lennon.

=== George Harrison ===
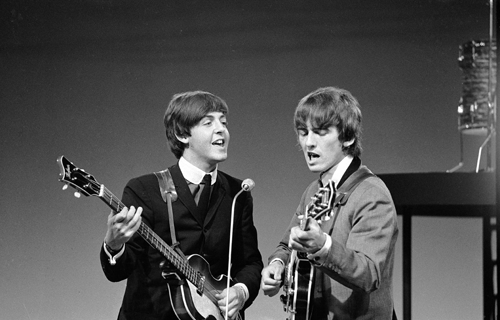
McCartney and Harrison in 1964

Discussing his relationship with McCartney, Harrison said: "Paul would always help along when you'd done his ten songs—then when he got 'round to doing one of my songs, he would help. It was silly. It was very selfish, actually ... There were a lot of tracks, though, where I played bass ... because what Paul would do—if he'd written a song, he'd learn all the parts for Paul and then come in the studio and say (sometimes he was very difficult): 'Do this'. He'd never give you the opportunity to come out with something."

After Harrison's death in November 2001, McCartney said he was "a lovely guy and a very brave man who had a wonderful sense of humour". He went on to say: "We grew up together and we just had so many beautiful times together—that's what I am going to remember. I'll always love him, he's my baby brother." On the first anniversary of his death, McCartney played Harrison's "Something" on a ukulele at the Concert for George; he would perform this rendition of the song on many subsequent solo tours. He also performed "For You Blue" and "All Things Must Pass", and played the piano on Eric Clapton's rendition of "While My Guitar Gently Weeps".

=== Ringo Starr ===
During a recording session for The Beatles in 1968, the two got into an argument over McCartney's critique of Starr's drum part for "Back in the U.S.S.R.", which contributed to Starr temporarily leaving the band. Starr later commented on working with McCartney: "Paul is the greatest bass player in the world. But he is also very determined ... [to] get his own way ... [thus] musical disagreements inevitably arose from time to time."

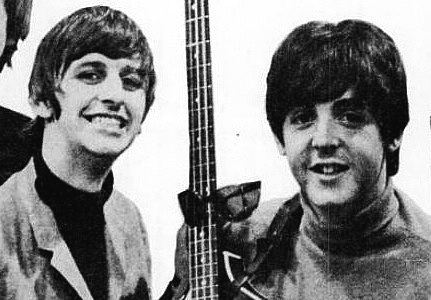
McCartney and Starr in 1965

McCartney and Starr collaborated on several post-Beatles projects, starting in 1973 when McCartney contributed instrumentation and backing vocals for "Six O'Clock", a song McCartney wrote for Starr's album Ringo. McCartney played a kazoo solo on "You're Sixteen" from the same album. Starr appeared as a fictional version of himself in McCartney's 1984 film Give My Regards to Broad Street, and played drums on most tracks of the soundtrack album, which includes re-recordings of several McCartney-penned Beatles songs. Starr played drums and sang backing vocals on "Beautiful Night" from McCartney's 1997 album Flaming Pie. The pair collaborated again in 1998, on Starr's Vertical Man, which featured McCartney's backing vocals on three songs, and instrumentation on one.

In 2009, the pair performed "With a Little Help from My Friends" at a benefit concert for the David Lynch Foundation. They collaborated on Starr's album Y Not in 2010. McCartney played bass on "Peace Dream", and sang a duet with Starr on "Walk with You". On 7 July 2010, Starr was performing at Radio City Music Hall in New York with his All-Starr Band in a concert celebrating his seventieth birthday. After the encores, McCartney made a surprise appearance, performing the Beatles' song "Birthday" with Starr's band. On 26 January 2014, McCartney and Starr performed "Queenie Eye" from McCartney's new album New at the 56th Annual Grammy Awards. McCartney inducted Starr into the Rock and Roll Hall of Fame in April 2015, and played bass on his 2017 album Give More Love. On 16 December 2018, Starr and Ronnie Wood joined McCartney onstage to perform "Get Back" at his concert at London's O2 Arena. Starr also made an appearance on the final day of McCartney's Freshen Up tour in July 2019, performing "Sgt. Pepper's Lonely Hearts Club Band (Reprise)" and "Helter Skelter". Wood and Starr joined McCartney again at the O2 Arena in London on 19 December 2024, performing the same three songs as in 2018 and 2019 respectively. McCartney performed "Get Back" with his original Höfner 500/1 bass that had been stolen in 1972 and recently recovered.

== Sources ==
- Badman, Keith (1999). The Beatles After the Breakup 1970–2000: A Day-by-Day Diary (2001 ed.). Omnibus. ISBN 978-0-7119-8307-6.
- Blaney, John (2007). Lennon and McCartney: Together Alone (1st ed.). Jawbone Press. ISBN 978-1-906002-02-2.
- Bowen, Phil (2008). A Gallery to Play to: The Story of Mersey Poets (2nd ed.). Liverpool: Liverpool University Press. ISBN 978-1-84631-125-3.
- Carlin, Peter Ames (2009). Paul McCartney: A Life (1st ed.). New York City, NY: Simon & Schuster. ISBN 978-1-84631-125-3.
- Cross, Craig (2004). Beatles-discography.Com: Day-by-Day Song-by-Song, Record-by-Record. New York City, NY: iUniverse. ISBN 978-0-595-31487-4.
- Doggett, Peter (2009). You Never Give Me Your Money: The Beatles After the Breakup (1st US hardcover ed.). Harper. ISBN 978-0-06-177446-1.
- Everett, Walter (1999). The Beatles as Musicians: Revolver through the Anthology. Oxford University Press. ISBN 978-0-19-512941-0.
- Flippo, Chet (1988). Yesterday: The Unauthorized Biography of Paul McCartney. New York City, NY: Doubleday. ISBN 978-0-385-23482-5.
- Graff, Gary (January 2000). "Yesterday & Today". Guitar World. 20 (1).
- Harry, Bill (2002). The Paul McCartney Encyclopedia. London: Virgin. ISBN 978-0-7535-0716-2.
- Harry, Bill (2003). The George Harrison Encyclopedia. Virgin. ISBN 978-0-7535-0822-0.
- Lewisohn, Mark, ed. (2002). Wingspan: Paul McCartney's Band on the Run. Little, Brown. ISBN 978-0-316-86032-1.
- MacDonald, Ian (2005). Revolution in the Head: The Beatles' Records and the Sixties (3rd (2007) ed.). Chicago Review Press. ISBN 978-1-55652-733-3.
- Miles, Barry (1997). Many Years From Now. New York City, NY: H. Holt. ISBN 978-0-8050-5249-7.
- Sandford, Christopher (2006). McCartney. Carroll & Graf. ISBN 978-0-7867-1614-2.
- Spitz, Bob (2005). The Beatles: The Biography. New York City, NY: Back Bay Books. ISBN 978-0-316-01331-4.
- The Beatles Anthology DVD (DVD). Geoff Wonfor. All Regions: Apple Corps. B00006GEMA.
- Wingspan DVD (DVD). Alistair Donald. Europe: Import. B00005NYA3.
