= Chamor Hill =

Hill in Braga, Portugal

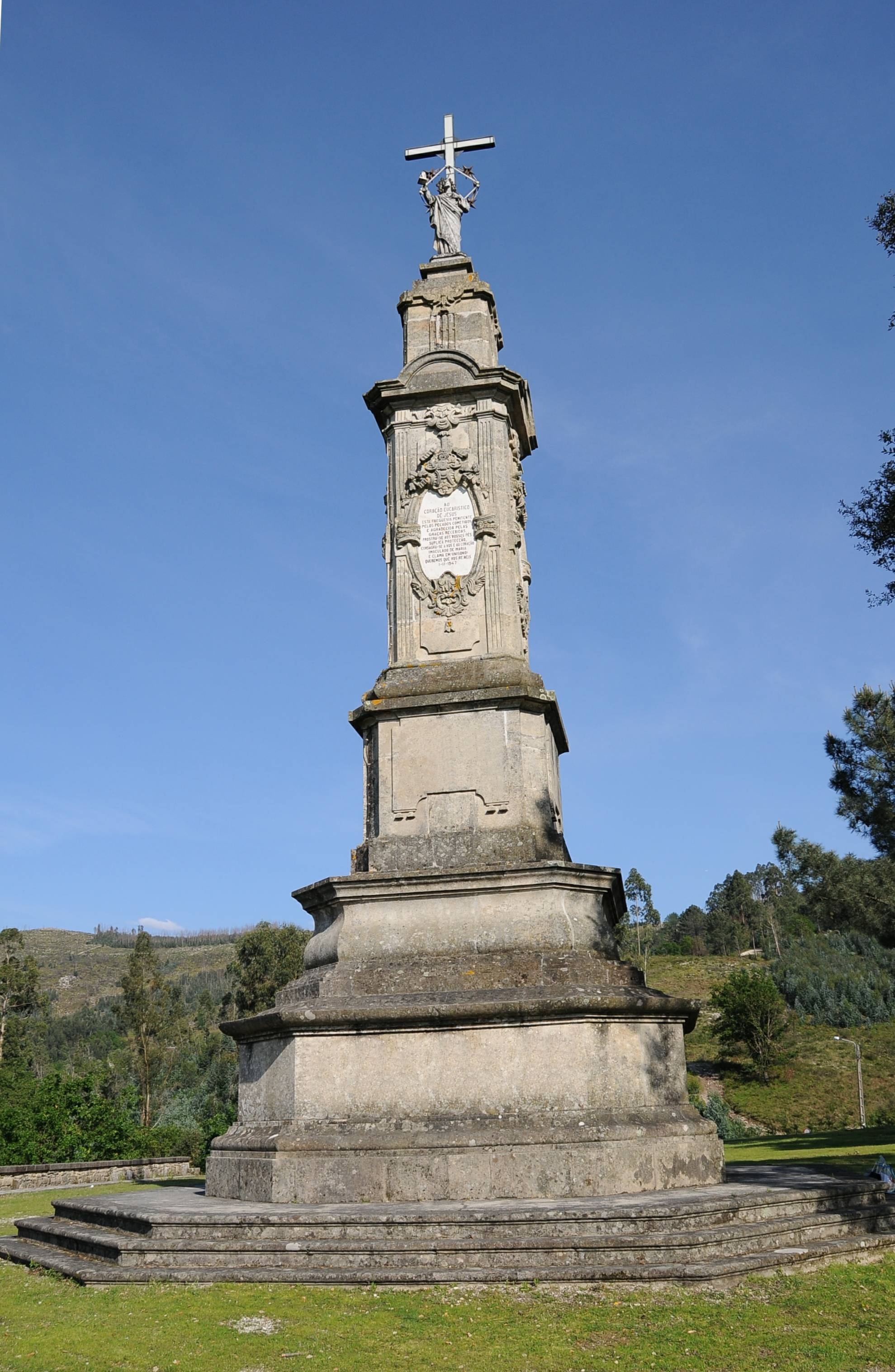

Highest point
- Coordinates: 41.5723°N 8.3517°W

Geography
- Location: São Mamede de Este, Braga, Portugal

Chamor Hill (Monte Chamor in Portuguese) is a hill located in São Mamede de Este, Braga, Portugal.

On the top of the hill, there is a monument to the Sacred Heart. It offers a panoramic view of the City, and is considered a landmark. It was erected in 1957, and is 20 metres high. The marble statue of Christ holds on the right hand the Chalice and the left hand is pointing to his heart. In 2026, the Diocese of Braga published a book commemorating the Sacred Heart monument and the life of servant of God Abílio Gomes Correia.

In 2024, the city of Braga inaugurated a redevelopment of the area around Chamor Hill.
