= Marylebone =

Area in London, England

Coordinates: 51°31′04″N 0°08′49″W

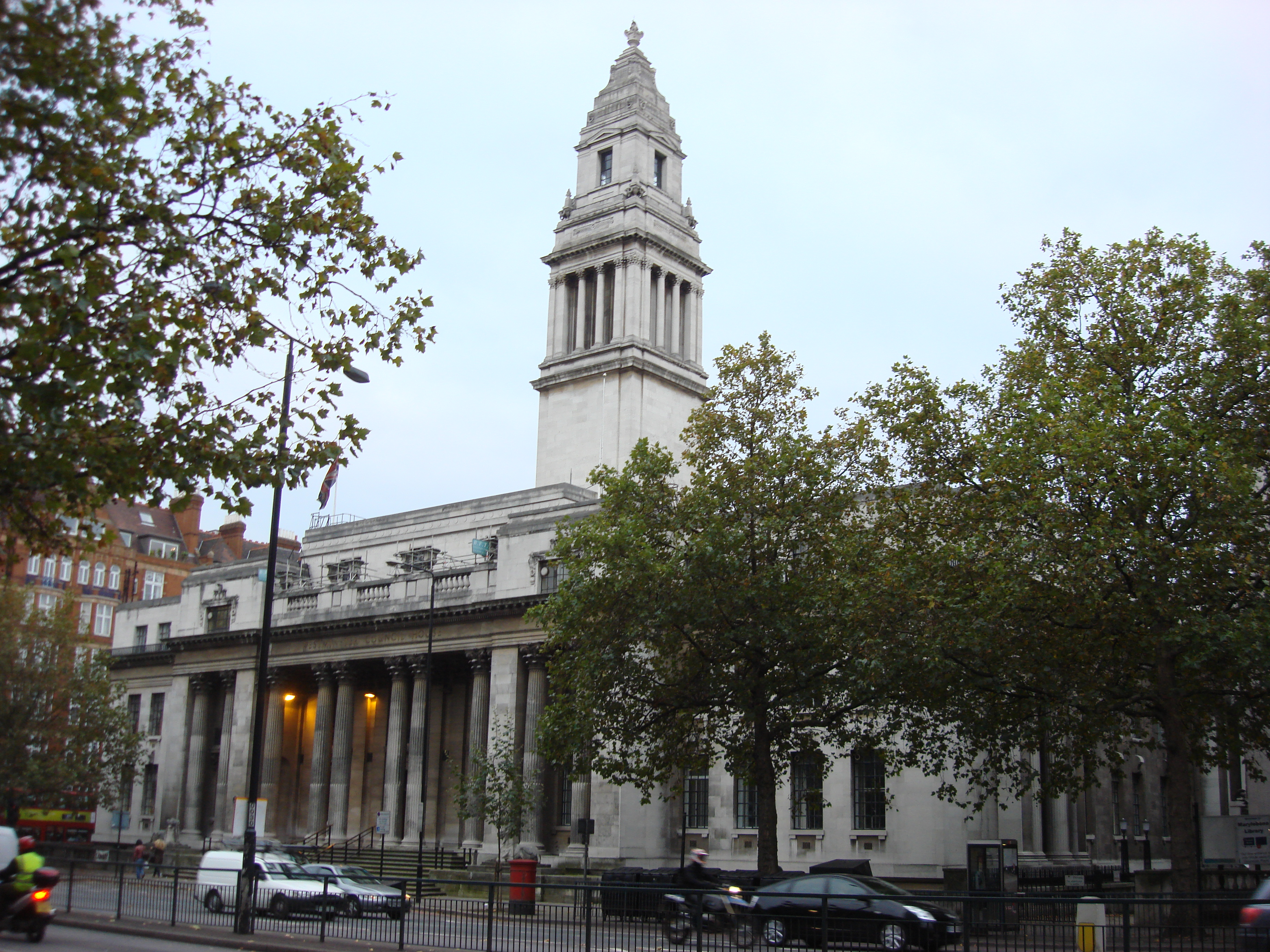
- Marylebone Town Hall

- Location within Greater London
- OS grid reference: TQ285815
- London borough: Westminster
- Ceremonial county: Greater London
- Region: London
- Country: England
- Sovereign state: United Kingdom
- Post town: LONDON
- Postcode district: W1
- Postcode district: NW1
- Dialling code: 020
- Police: Metropolitan
- Fire: London
- Ambulance: London
- UK Parliament: Cities of London and Westminster; Queen's Park and Maida Vale
- London Assembly: West Central

Marylebone (usually /ˈmɑːrlɪbən/ MAR-lib-ən, also /ˈmærɪ(lə)bən/ MARR-il-ə-bən, MARR-ib-ən) is an area in London, England, and is located in the City of Westminster. It is in Central London and part of the West End. Oxford Street forms its southern boundary.

An ancient parish and latterly a metropolitan borough, it merged with the boroughs of Westminster and Paddington to form the new City of Westminster in 1965.

Marylebone station lies 2 miles (3.2 kilometres) north-west of Charing Cross.

The area is also served by numerous tube stations: Baker Street, Bond Street, Edgware Road (Bakerloo line), Edgware Road (Circle, District and Hammersmith & City lines), Great Portland Street, Marble Arch, Marylebone, Oxford Circus, and Regent's Park.

== History ==
The Parish and Borough of St Marylebone

Marylebone was an Ancient Parish formed to serve the manors (landholdings) of Lileston (in the west, which gives its name to modern Lisson Grove) and Tyburn in the east. The parish is likely to have been in place since at least the twelfth century and will have used the boundaries of the pre-existing manors. The boundaries of the parish were consistent from the late twelfth century to the creation of the Metropolitan Borough which succeeded it.

=== Toponymy ===
The name Marylebone originates from an ancient hamlet located near today's Marble Arch, on the eastern banks of the Tyburn, where in 1400 a parish church dedicated to St Mary was built. Since the 12th century, the area had been synonymous with the Tyburn gallows, where public executions regularly took place at the crossroads of the Tyburn and old Roman road.

Eager to distance themselves from the notorious gallows, the villagers took inspiration from their new church and began calling the hamlet St Mary-burne ("the stream of St Mary", burne coming from the Anglo-Saxon word burna for a small stream). This stream rose further north in (Hampstead), eventually running along what became Marylebone Lane, which preserves its curve within the grid pattern.

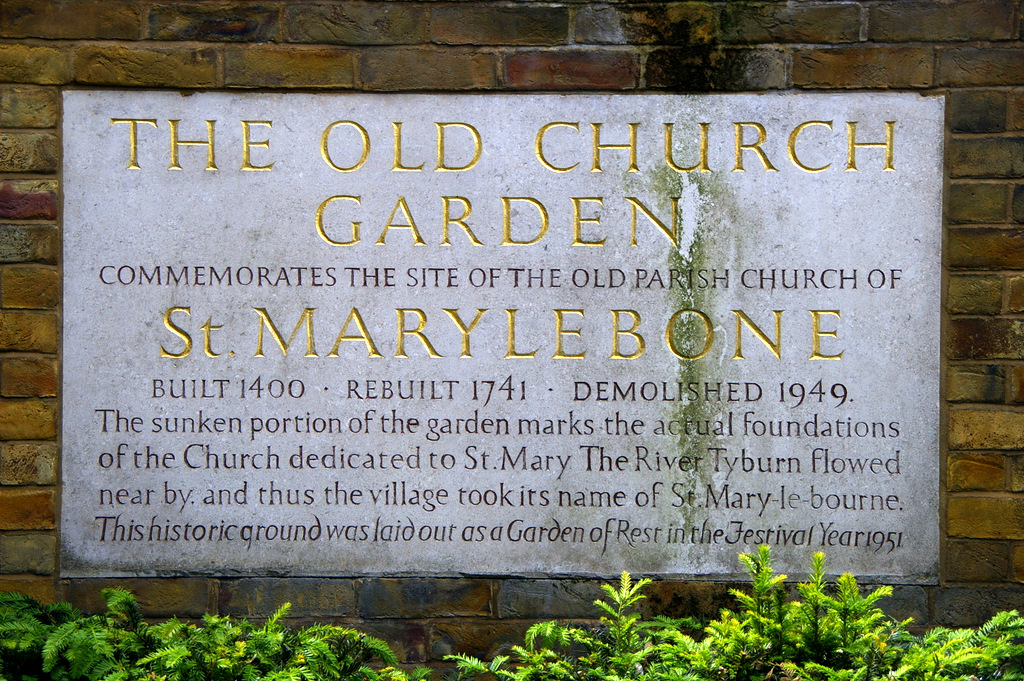
Plaque commemorating St. Mary's church (1400–1949), origin of the name "Marylebone"

In the 17th century, under the influence of names like Mary-le-Bow, the French-derived preposition le appeared midway in the parish name, and eventually St Mary-le-bourne became St Marylebone. Other spelling iterations include Mariburn, Marybone, and in Samuel Pepys' diary, Marrowbone. The suggestion that the name derives from Marie la Bonne, or "Mary the Good", is not substantiated.

=== Manors of Tyburn and Lileston ===
Both manors were mentioned in the Domesday Book of 1086. Domesday recorded eight households in each manor, implying a combined population of less than a hundred.

At Domesday the Manor of Lilestone was valued at 60 shillings and owned by a woman called Ediva. Tyburn was a possession of the Nunnery of Barking Abbey and valued at 52 shillings. The ownership of both manors was the same as it had been before the Conquest.

Lilestone became the property of the Knights Templar until their suppression in 1312. It then passed to the Order of Knights of the Hospital of Saint John of Jerusalem, whose name is the origin of the place name St John's Wood.

Early in the 13th century Tyburn was held by Robert de Vere, 3rd Earl of Oxford. At the end of the 15th century Thomas Hobson bought up the greater part of the manor; in 1544 his son Thomas exchanged it with Henry VIII, who enclosed the northern part of the manor as a deer park, the distant origin of Regent's Park. Lilestone Manor also passed into the hands of the Crown at this time.

Tyburn manor remained with the Crown until the southern part was sold in 1611 by James I, who retained the deer park, to Edward Forest, who had held it as a fixed rental under Elizabeth I. Forest's manor of Marylebone then passed by marriage to the Austen family. The deer park, Marylebone Park Fields, was let out in small holdings for hay and dairy produce.

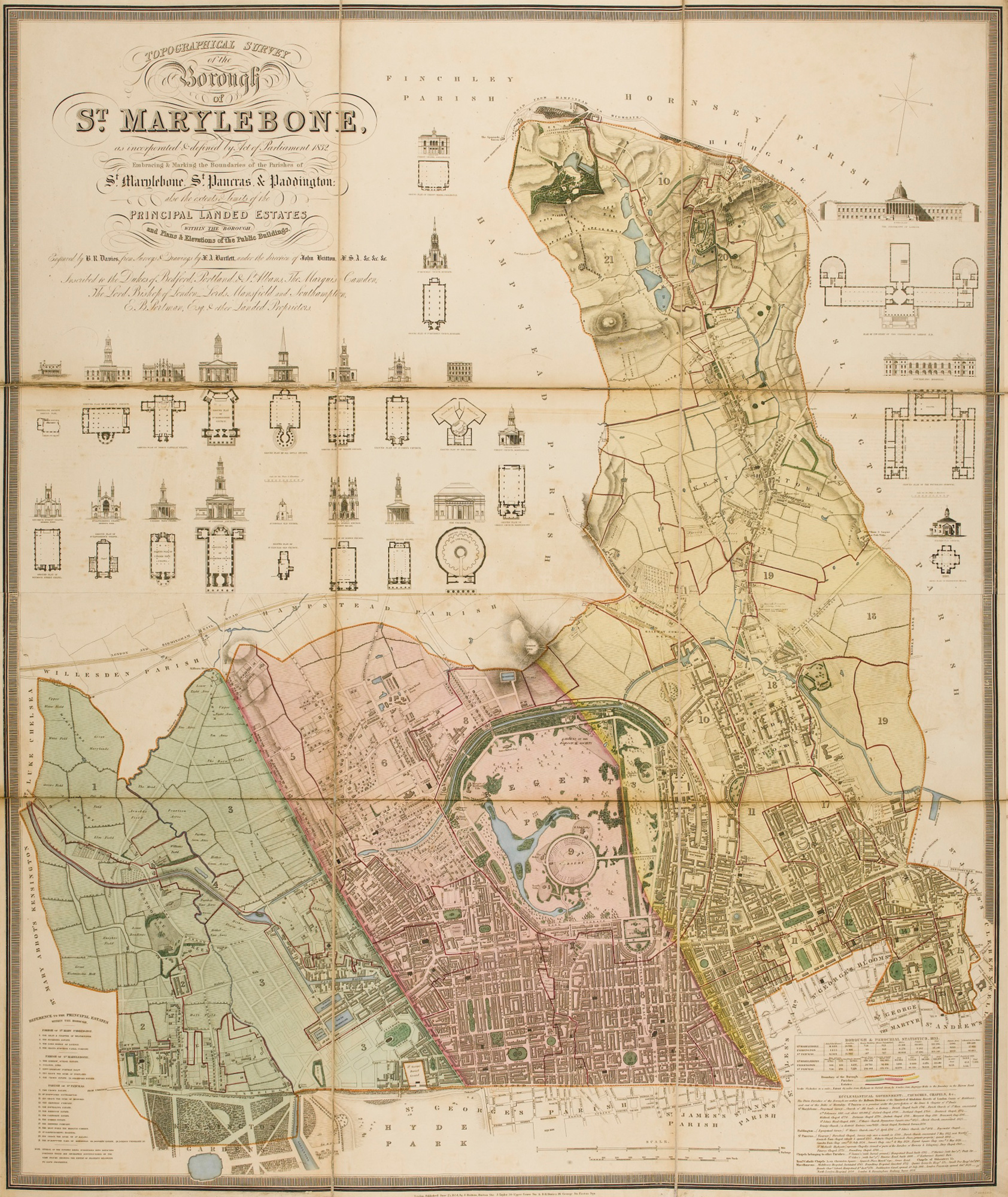
An 1834 map of the borough of St Marylebone, showing the parishes of Paddington (green), Marylebone (red), and St Pancras (yellow)

=== Shifting parish church ===
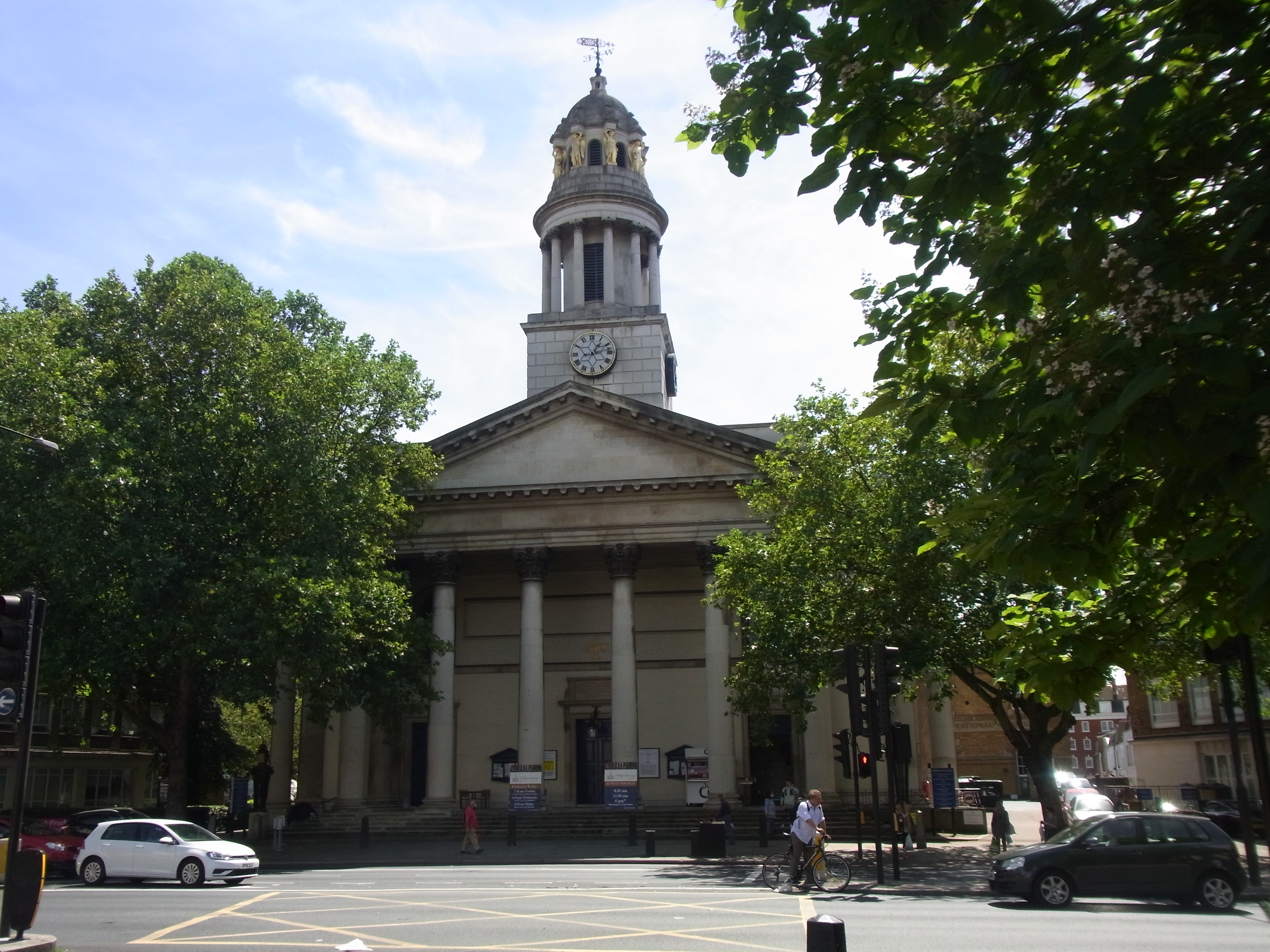
St Marylebone Church

The Ancient Parish's church, St Marylebone Parish Church, has been rebuilt several times at various locations within the parish. The earliest known church dedicated to St John the Evangelist was established by Barking Abbey, which held Manor of Tyburn, at an unknown date, but probably sometime in the 12th century. This church was located on the north side of Oxford Street, probably near the junction with Marylebone Lane. This site was subject to regular robbery and in 1400 a new church was built, around 900 metres further north. and given the name St Mary by the Bourne. This church was rebuilt in 1740 with a new building erected a little further north in 1817.

=== Urbanisation ===
In 1710, John Holles, Duke of Newcastle, purchased the manor for £17,500, and his daughter and heir, Lady Henrietta Cavendish Holles, by her marriage to Edward Harley, Earl of Oxford, passed it into the family of the Earl of Oxford, one of whose titles was Lord Harley of Wigmore. She and the earl, realising the need for fashionable housing north of the Oxford Road (now Oxford St), commissioned the surveyor and builder John Prince to draw a master plan that set Cavendish Square in a rational grid system of streets.

The Harley heiress Lady Margaret Cavendish Harley married William, 2nd Duke of Portland, and took the property, including Marylebone High Street, into the Bentinck family. Such place names in the neighbourhood as Cavendish Square and Portland Place reflect the Dukes of Portland landholdings and Georgian-era developments there. In 1879 the fifth Duke died without issue and the estate passed through the female line to his sister, Lucy Joan Bentinck, widow of the 6th Baron Howard de Walden.

Most of the Manor of Lileston was acquired by Sir William Portman in 1554, and much of this was developed by his descendants as the Portman Estate in the late 1700s. Both estates have aristocratic antecedents and are still run by members of the aforementioned families. The Howard de Walden Estate owns, leases and manages the majority of the 92 acres (37 ha) of real estate in Marylebone which comprises the area from Marylebone High Street in the west to Robert Adam's Portland Place in the east and from Wigmore Street in the south to Marylebone Road in the north.

=== Social history ===
In the 18th century the area was known for the raffish entertainments in Marylebone Gardens, the scene of bear-baiting and prize fights by members of both sexes, and for the duelling grounds in Marylebone Fields. The Marylebone Cricket Club, for many years the governing body of world cricket, was formed in 1787 and initially based at Dorset Fields before moving a short distance to its current home at Lord's Cricket Ground in 1814. Lord's is also home to Middlesex County Cricket Club and the England and Wales Cricket Board, and is one of several home venues for the England national men's and women's teams. The ground is marketed as the Home of Cricket by the MCC.

Marylebone has some Beatles heritage. As well as Paul McCartney's residence at the Wimpole Street home of Jane Asher's family, John Lennon had a flat at 34 Montagu Square. The original Apple Corps headquarters were at 95 Wigmore Street and the former headquarters of EMI (since demolished) were in Manchester Square; it was here that the famous photograph of the four band members looking over a balcony (used as the cover of the album "Please Please Me" was taken.

=== Coat of arms ===
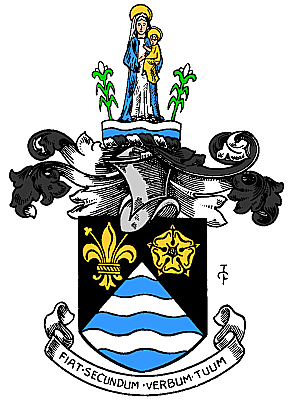
The Marylebone coat of arms

The Borough of St Marylebone was granted a coat of arms by the College of Arms in 1901. The crest includes the Virgin Mary wearing a silver robe with a light blue mantle, holding the infant Jesus, dressed in gold. The wavy light blue bars represent the River Tyburn while the gold roses and lilies are taken from the arms of Barking Abbey, which held the Manor of Tyburn and first established the parish church. The version used by the Abbey was placed against a red border, and some versions of Marylebone's arms have made extensive use of red. The roses and lilies ultimately derive from the legend that when Mary's tomb was opened it contained those flowers.

The motto "Fiat secundum Verbum Tuum" is Latin for "let it be according to thy word", a phrase used in the Gospel of Luke.

=== Later administrative history ===
The Metropolitan Borough of St Marylebone was a metropolitan borough of the County of London between 1899 and 1965, after which, with the Metropolitan Borough of Paddington and the Metropolitan Borough of Westminster it was merged into the City of Westminster. The Metropolitan Borough inherited the boundaries of the Ancient Parish which had been fixed since at least the 12th century. Marylebone Town Hall was completed in 1920.

=== 20th century ===
Marylebone was the scene of the Balcombe Street siege in 1975, when Provisional Irish Republican Army terrorists held two people hostage for almost a week.

== Streets ==
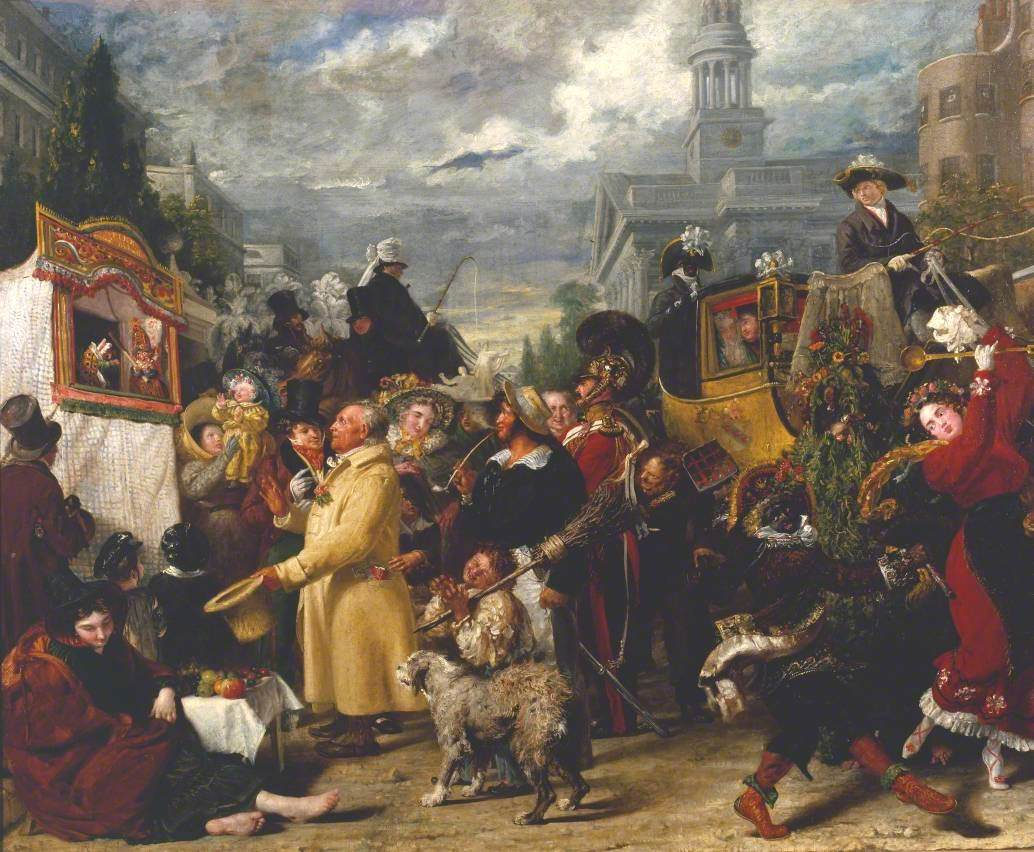
Punch or May Day by Benjamin Robert Haydon (1829), depicts St Marylebone Church in the background.

Some of Marylebone's major streets form a grid pattern such as Gloucester Place, Baker Street, Wimpole Street, Harley Street and Portland Place, with smaller mews between the major streets.

Mansfield Street is a short continuation of Chandos Street built by the Adam brothers in 1770, on a plot of ground which had been underwater. Most of its houses are fine buildings with exquisite interiors, which if put on the market now would have an expected price in excess of £10 million. At Number 13 lived religious architect John Loughborough Pearson who died in 1897, and designer of Castle Drogo and New Delhi Sir Edwin Lutyens, who died in 1944. Immediately across the road at 61 New Cavendish Street lived Natural History Museum creator Alfred Waterhouse.

Queen Anne Street is an elegant cross-street which unites the northern end of Chandos Street with Welbeck Street. The painter J. M. W. Turner moved to 47 Queen Anne Street in 1812 from 64 Harley Street, now divided into numbers 22 and 23, and owned the house until his death in 1851. It was known as "Turner's Den", becoming damp, dilapidated, dusty, dirty, with dozens of Turner's works of art now in the National Gallery scattered throughout the house, walls covered in tack holes and a drawing room inhabited by cats with no tails.

During the same period a few hundred yards to the east, Chandos House in Chandos Street was used as the Austro-Hungarian Embassy and residence of the fabulously extravagant Ambassador Prince Paul Anton III Esterhazy, seeing entertainment on a most lavish scale. The building is one of the finest surviving Adam houses in London, and now lets rooms.

Wimpole Street runs from Henrietta Place north to Devonshire Street, becoming Upper Wimpole en route – the latter where Arthur Conan Doyle opened his ophthalmic practice at number 2 in 1891; Conan Doyle's fictional detective Sherlock Holmes also had his residence in Marylebone at 221b Baker Street. Nearby at a six-floor Grade II 18th-century house at 57 Wimpole Street is where Paul McCartney resided from 1964 to 1966, staying on the top floor of girlfriend Jane Asher's family home. John Lennon wrote "I Want to Hold Your Hand" on a piano in the basement. A further Beatles connection is that they, and many other musicians have recorded at the Abbey Road Studios. At her father's house at number 50 Wimpole Street lived for some time between 1840 and 1845, Elizabeth Barrett, then known as the author of a volume of poems, and who afterwards escaped and was better known as Elizabeth Barrett Browning.

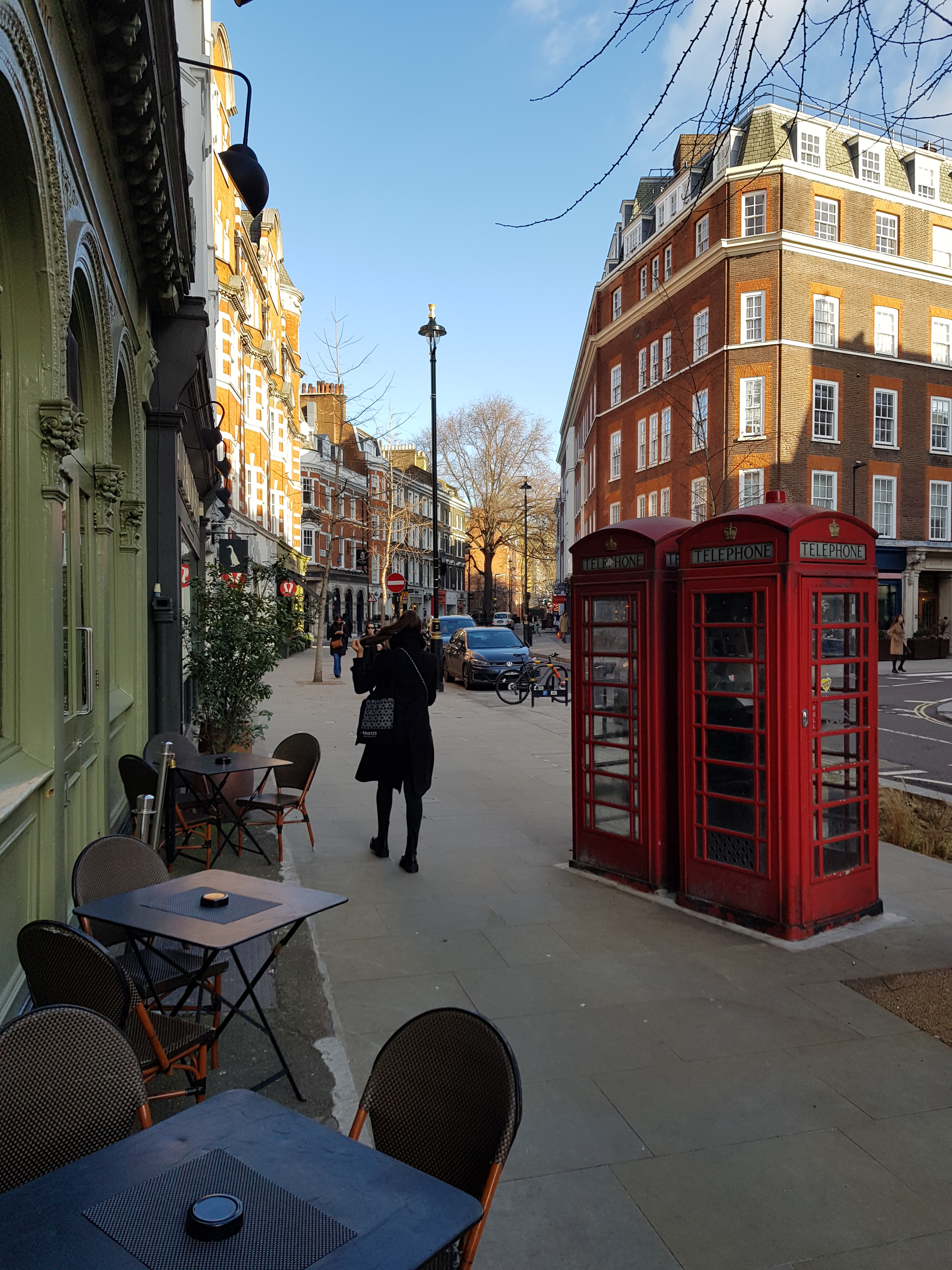
Marylebone High Street

Bentinck Street leaves Welbeck Street and touches the middle of winding Marylebone Lane. Charles Dickens lived at number 18 with his indebted father (on whom the character Wilkins Micawber was based) while working as a court reporter in the 1830s, and Edward Gibbon wrote much of The Decline and Fall of the Roman Empire while living at number 7 from the early 1770s. James Smithson wrote the will that led to the foundation of the Smithsonian Institution while living at number 9 in 1826, while number 10 was briefly graced by Chopin in 1848, who found his apartment too expensive and moved to Mayfair. Cambridge spies Anthony Blunt and Guy Burgess lived at 5 Bentinck Street during the Second World War. In the 1960s, the artist John Dunbar and Alexis Mardas, known as "Magic Alex", lived on the street. Princess Alexandra, 2nd Duchess of Fife, who was a qualified nurse, founded a nursing home in Bentinck Street, and served as its matron.

Manchester Square, west of Bentinck Street, has a central private garden with plane trees, laid out in 1776-88. The mansion on the north side of the square, now the home of the Wallace Collection, once housed the Spanish ambassador, whose chapel was in Spanish Place. From the north-west corner is Manchester Street, final home of Georgian-era prophet Joanna Southcott, who died there in 1814.

Bulstrode Street, small and charming, is named after a Portman family estate in Buckinghamshire, itself named after a local family there made-good in Tudor days. Tucked away, with a few terraced houses, Bulstrode Street has been the home of minor health care professionals for hundreds of years. The RADA student and aspiring actress Vivien Leigh, aged twenty in 1933, gave birth at the Rahere Nursing Home, then at number 8, to her first child.

The north end of Welbeck Street joins New Cavendish Street, the name of which changed from Upper Marylebone Street after World War I. Number 13 in New Cavendish Street, at its junction with Welbeck Street and on the corner of Marylebone Street, was the birthplace in 1882 of the orchestral conductor Leopold Stokowski, the son of a Polish cabinet maker. He sang as a boy in the choir of St Marylebone Church.

At the northern end of Marylebone High Street towards the Marylebone Road there is an area with a colourful history, which includes the former Marylebone Gardens, whose entertainments including bare-knuckle fighting, a cemetery, a workhouse, and the areas frequented by Charles Wesley, all shut down by the close of the 18th century, where today there are mansion blocks and upper-end retail.

At No. 1 Dorset Street resided mid-Victorian scientist Charles Babbage, inventor of the analytical engine. Babbage complained that two adjacent hackney-coach stands in Paddington Street ruined the neighbourhood, leading to the establishment of coffee and beer shops, and furthermore, the character of the new population could be inferred from the taste they exhibited for the noisiest and most discordant music. An acclaimed international venue for chamber music, the Wigmore Hall, opened at 36 Wigmore Street in 1901. It hosts over 500 concerts each year.

The Marylebone Low Emission Neighbourhood was established in 2016 to improve the air quality of the area. Westminster City Council in partnership with local residents, businesses and stakeholders completed a green grid of 1000 new street trees on Marylebone's streets in 2020. An initiative to establish Marylebone Community Hall on Moxon street was launched in 2024.

== Representation ==
Marylebone was in the St Marylebone UK Parliament constituency between 1918 and 1983. From 1983 to 2024, the area was divided between the Cities of London and Westminster and Westminster North parliamentary constituencies. Following the 2023 review of Westminster constituencies, the area is mostly in the Cities of London and Westminster constituency but Church Street ward, Lisson Grove is in Queen's Park and Maida Vale. As of 2025, the MPs for Cities of London and Westminster and Queen's Park and Maida Vale are Rachel Blake (Labour and Co-operative) and Georgia Gould (Labour) respectively.

The Marylebone ward elects 3 councillors to Westminster City Council.

== Geography ==
The parish and borough were bounded by two Roman roads, Oxford Street to the south and Watling Street (Edgware Road) to the west, and positioned on both sides of the former River Tyburn which flowed from north to south. To the north (Boundary Road in St John's Wood) and east (running through Regent's Park and along Cleveland Street), the area's boundaries have later been inherited as part of the northern and eastern boundary of the modern City of Westminster.

The modern boundaries are usually placed as Oxford Street to the south, Edgware Road to the west, Great Portland Street to the east and the Regent's Canal to the north. The part of Marylebone north of Marylebone Road and west of Marylebone Station is often called Lisson Grove after its main street.

Areas and features of Marylebone include:

- All Souls Church, Langham Place (designed by John Nash)
- Baker Street (including the fictitious 221B Baker Street)
- Broadcasting House (BBC headquarters)
- Bryanston Square
- Dorset Square
- Duke Street, Marylebone
- Harley Street
- Hinde Street Methodist Chapel
- Holy Trinity Church, Marylebone (designed by Sir John Soane)
- Hyde Park
- Langham Hotel, London (built in the 1860s)
- London Business School, founded in 1964
- London Central Mosque
- Madame Tussauds
- Manchester Square (Georgian square)
- Marble Arch
- Marylebone High Street
- Montagu Square (Regency square)
- Regent's Park (which houses London Zoo)
- Royal Academy of Music
- Royal Institute of British Architects
- Selfridges Department Store
- St. James's, Spanish Place
- St Peter, Vere Street (designed in 1722 by James Gibbs)
- University of Westminster
- Wallace Collection
- West London Mission at 19 Thayer Street
- Wigmore Hall
- Wigmore Street
- Wyndham Place

== Former landmarks ==
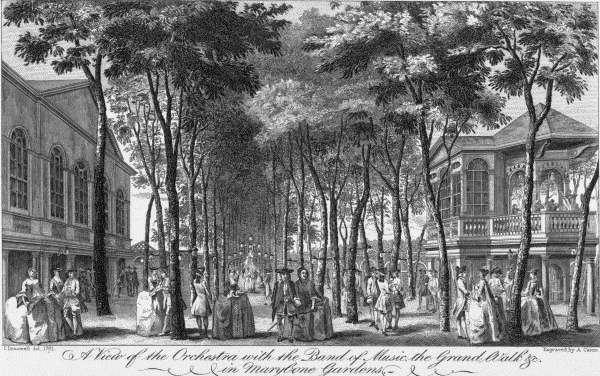
Marylebone Gardens, c. 1770

- Egton House, studio of BBC Radio 1, demolished
- Queen's Hall, classical music concert venue destroyed by fire in World War II
- Marylebone Gardens a former pleasure ground and venue for concerts, closed in 1778
- St. George's Hall, a theatre built in 1867, demolished 1966.
- Yorkshire Stingo, a public house on Marylebone Road.
- St Marylebone Grammar School on the corner of Lisson Grove and Marylebone Road, now offices.
- Theatre Royal, Marylebone, a former music hall opened in 1832 at 71 Church Street, Marylebone, demolished in 1959.
- Freshwater Place off Homer Street, pioneering social housing by Octavia Hill, demolished in 1961.

== Notable residents ==
- Leonora de Alberti, English historian, translator and suffragist
- Louisa Ardill (1853-1920), British-born Australian temperance leader, suffragist, and city missionary
- Francis Burgess (musician and priest), composer and proponent of Anglican plainsong, born in Marylebone
- Lord Byron, English romantic poet, born in Marylebone and baptised St Marylebone Parish Church.
- Bertie Carvel, English actor born in Marylebone
- Amelia Dimoldenberg, English comedian and presenter, born in Marylebone.
- Charles Dickens, English writer, lived in 1 Devonshire Terrace, a building that was demolished in the 1950s.
- Charlotte Gainsbourg, Anglo-French actress and singer, born in Marylebone.
- Benny Green, English jazz saxophonist, born in Marylebone.
- Robin Hurlstone, English actor, born in Marylebone.
- W. O. G. Lofts, English researcher and author, born in Marylebone.
- Paul McCartney, English musician, wrote "Yesterday" whilst living at 57 Wimpole Street.
- Norman Wisdom, English actor, comedian, musician and singer, born in Marylebone.
- Steve Wright, English disc jockey and radio presenter, lived and died in Marylebone.
- Thomas Paine, wrote "The Rights of Man" while living with Thomas Clio Rickman at No. 7 Upper Marylebone Street, which is now No. 154 New Cavendish Street.
- Freddy Carter, English actor

== Transport ==
=== Tube stations ===
- Baker Street
- Bond Street
- Edgware Road (Bakerloo line)
- Edgware Road (Circle, District and Hammersmith & City lines)
- Great Portland Street
- Marble Arch
- Marylebone
- Oxford Circus
- Regent's Park

=== Railway stations ===
- Marylebone

=== Bus ===
The area is served by routes 2, 13, 18, 27, 30, 74, 113, 139, 189, 205, 274, 453 and night routes N18 and N74.

== Education ==
- London Business School (one of the top-ranked elite business schools in the world)
- Halcyon London International School (International school on Seymour Place)
- St Marylebone School (comprehensive specialist school in Performing Arts, Maths & Computing for girls founded in 1791)
- Sylvia Young Theatre School (fee paying performing arts school)
- St Vincent's RC Primary School (Catholic Voluntary Aided Mixed School)
- Francis Holland School (independent day school for girls)
- Portland Place School (independent secondary school)
- The Royal Academy of Music on Marylebone Road
- The University of Westminster on Marylebone Road and upper Regent Street
- Regent's College, whose campus is within the grounds of Regent's Park, which houses:European Business School London; British American College London; Regent's Business School; School of Psychotherapy and Counselling; Webster Graduate School; Internexus, a provider of English language courses.
- L'Ecole Internationale Franco-Anglaise (international school providing English-French bilingual education)
- Queen's College Preparatory School (independent day school for girls)
- Southbank International School on Portland Place
