= Marylebone Town Hall =

Municipal building in London, England

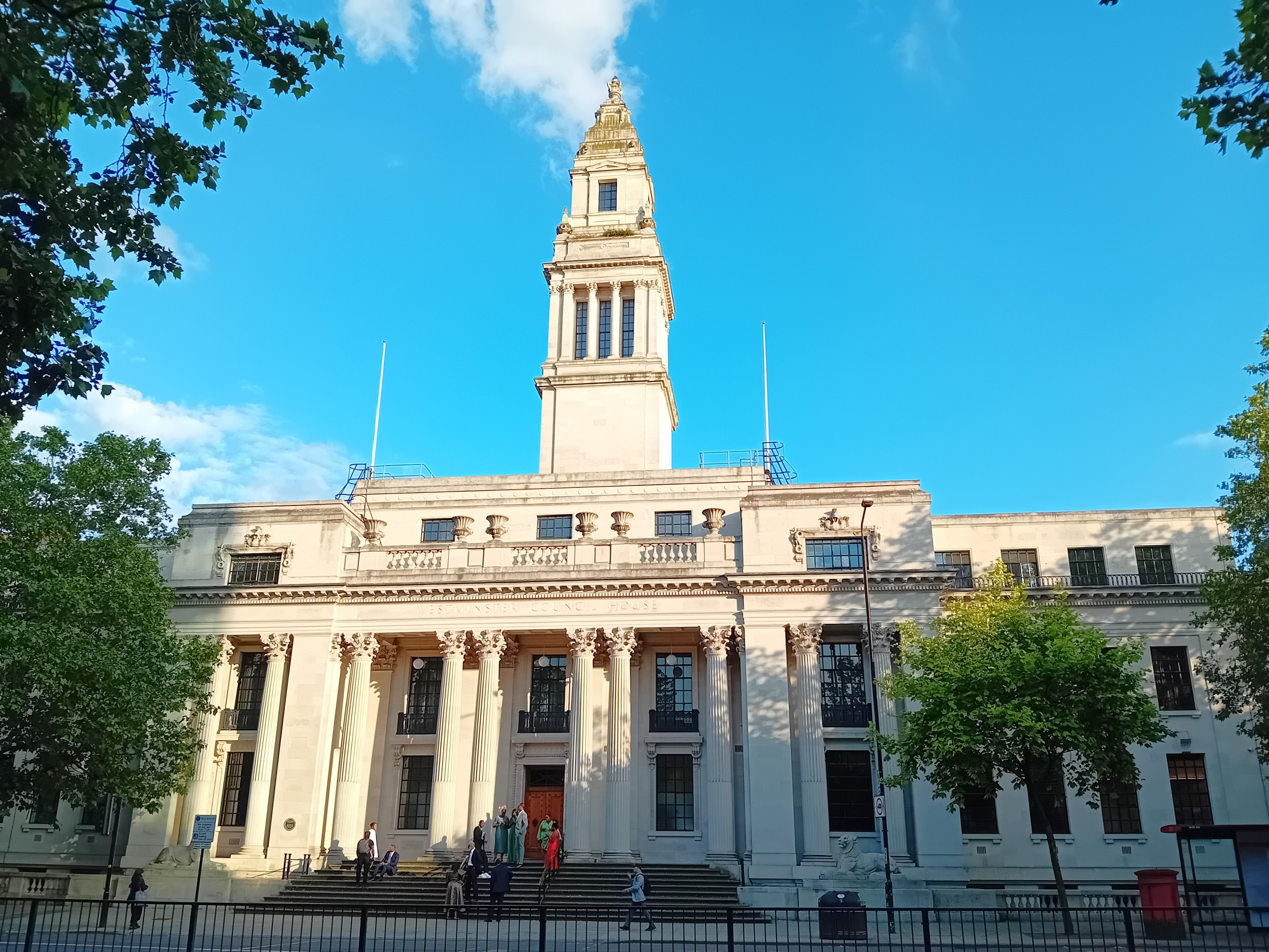
- Marylebone Town Hall

- Shown in Westminster
- 51.5213°N 0.1600°W
- Location: Marylebone Road, Marylebone

History
- Built: 1920

Site notes
- Architect: Sir Edwin Cooper
- Architectural style: Edwardian Graeco-Roman classicist style

Listed Building – Grade II
- Designated: 16 January 1981
- Reference no.: 1222688

Marylebone Town Hall, also known as the Westminster Council House, is a municipal building at 97–113 Marylebone Road in Marylebone, London NW1. The complex includes the council chamber, the Westminster Register Office and an educational facility known as the Sammy Ofer Centre. It is a Grade II listed building.

== History ==
The building was commissioned to replace the old courthouse at the south end of Marylebone Lane which dated back in part to the 18th century. After the area became a metropolitan borough in 1900, civic leaders decided that the old courthouse was inadequate for their needs and decided to procure a new town hall: the site selected for the new facility in Marylebone Road had been occupied by a row of residential properties.

The foundation stone for the new building was laid by the Princess Royal on 8 July 1914. The new building was designed by Sir Edwin Cooper in the Edwardian Graeco-Roman classicist style and built by Messrs John Greenwood. After a pause in construction caused by the First World War, it was officially opened by Prince Albert (the future George VI) on 27 March 1920. The design involved a symmetrical main frontage with 13 bays facing onto Marylebone Road; the central section of five bays featured a two-storey tetrastyle portico with full height Corinthian order columns; the doorway was flanked by windows on the ground floor; there were further windows on the first floor and smaller windows on the second floor; a colonnaded tower was erected on the roof.

A public library, which was also designed by Cooper, was built to the west of the town hall in 1939. The council chamber was badly damaged by bombing during the Second World War. The town hall, which had served as the headquarters of the Metropolitan Borough of St Marylebone for much of the 20th century, ceased to be the local seat of government when the enlarged City of Westminster was formed in 1965. The damaged council chamber was restored, to a design by T. P. Bennett and Sons, in 1968 to allow it to continue to be used as a meeting place by Westminster City Council.

The building, which continued to accommodate the Westminster Register Office, hosted the marriage of Cilla Black to Bobby Willis in January 1969, Sir Paul McCartney to Linda Eastman in March 1969 and Ringo Starr to Barbara Bach in April 1981 as well as that of Melanie Griffith to Antonio Banderas in May 1996 and Liam Gallagher to Patsy Kensit in April 1997. Since the turn of the millennium, it has been the venue of the marriage of Claudia Winkleman to Kris Thykier in June 2000, Liam Gallagher to Nicole Appleton in February 2008 and Sean Bean to Georgina Sutcliffe also in February 2008, Sir Paul McCartney to Nancy Shevell in October 2011, as well as that of Callum Turner to Dua Lipa in May 2026.

The London Business School acquired the town hall in November 2012 and, with financial support from the Ofer family, spent £60 million on refurbishing and improving it. The improvements, which were designed by Sheppard Robson, included a new glass and steel link structure between the town hall and the library allowing access to the new education facility known as the "Sammy Ofer Centre". The improvements also allowed continued access to the council chamber and the Westminster Register Office using the civic steps. The facility re-opened again in January 2018.
