= 8 and 9 Bentinck Street =

Terraced houses in the City of Westminster, London, England

Coordinates: 51°31′02″N 0°09′01″W

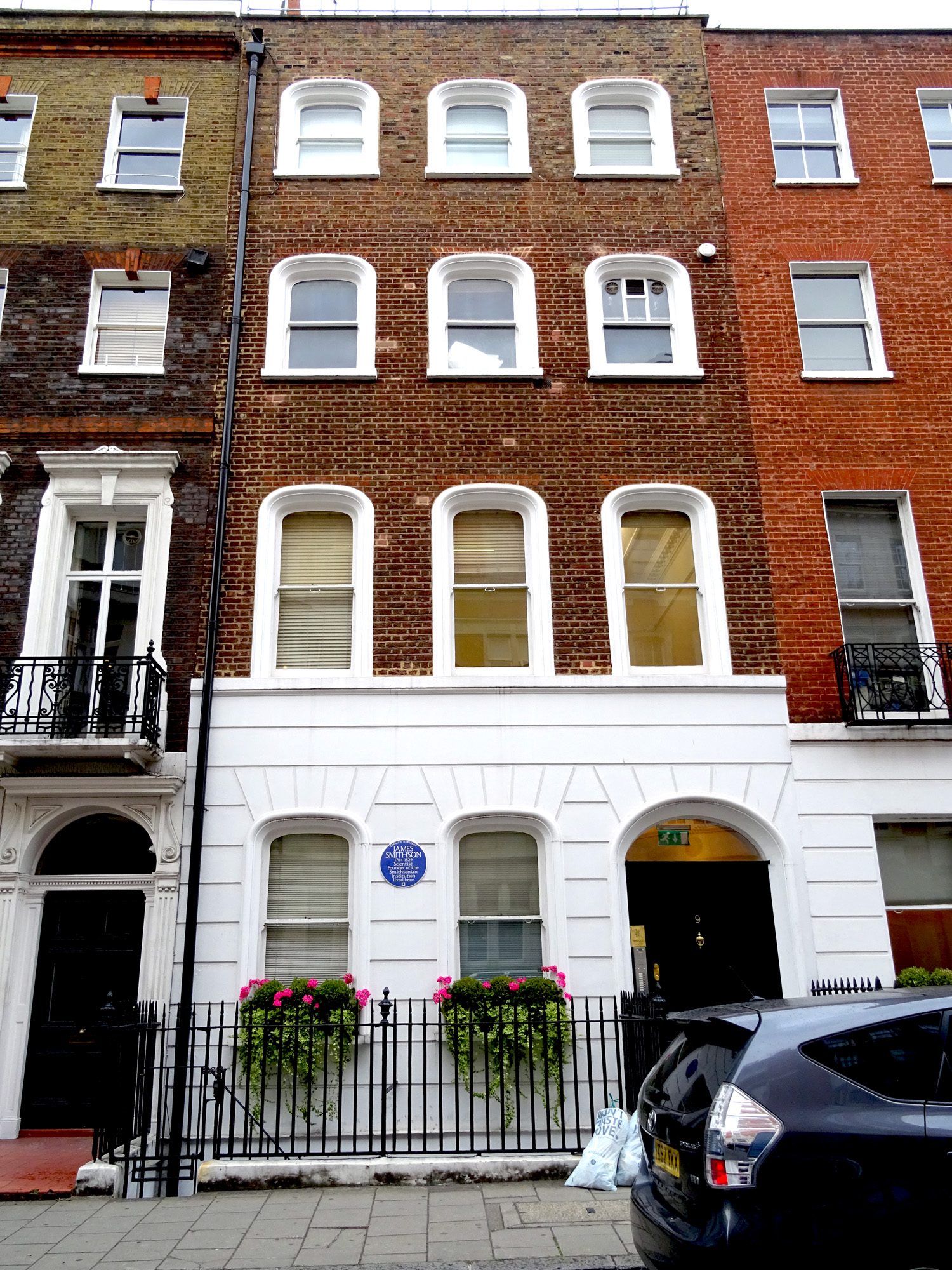
9 Bentinck Street, Marylebone, former home of James Smithson, founder of the Smithsonian Institution.

8 and 9 Bentinck Street are adjacent grade II listed terraced houses in Bentinck Street, in the City of Westminster, London. Number 8 was completed around 1780, and number 9 in 1780–90. A blue plaque notes the fact that James Smithson, founder of the Smithsonian Institution, once lived at number 9.
