= W. W. Estes =

American farmer and businessman

- Born: Webb Wallace Estes; August 12, 1897; Burke County, North Carolina, U.S.
- Died: June 29, 1971 (aged 73); Richmond, Virginia, U.S.
- Resting place: Woodland Cemetery; Chase City, Virginia, U.S.
- Occupations: Businessman; farmer; politician
- Known for: Founding Estes Express Lines
- Board member of: Mecklenburg County Board of Supervisors, First Commonwealth Corporation, Community Memorial Hospital

Webb Wallace Estes (August 12, 1897 – June 29, 1971) was an American farmer and businessman who founded Estes Express Lines, the largest privately held less-than-truckload (LTL) company in the United States.

== Childhood and education ==
Estes was born in Burke County, North Carolina, the son of David Wallace Estes and Myrta Wilton Webb. He attended primary school and was an apprentice to his father, who was a timber farmer and sawmill operator.

== Career ==
=== Early years and life ===
In 1920, Estes moved to a 100-acre farm that his father had purchased near Chase City, Virginia. Estes began farming cotton, raising livestock, and producing eggs and butter.

=== Estes Express Lines ===
In 1931 during the height of the Great Depression, Estes purchased a used Chevrolet truck and began providing affordable livestock transportation services for local farmers near Chase City, Virginia. By the following year, he was able to hire his first driver, and had expanded services to include trucking and hauling general freight. The company continued to grow through the establishment of additional terminals, purchase of new routes, and acquisition of subsidiary trucking companies. The company was formally named "Estes Express Lines" in 1937. In his management style of the company, Estes was fiscally conservative and promoted slow and measured growth. During World War II, Estes was able to expand the business through contracts with the U.S. military to transport and deliver military supplies.

By the 1950s, the company had over 50 employees with annual revenues of US$695,000, reaching annual revenues of US$1 million by 1957. Estes led the company as president from its founding in 1931 until his death in 1971, when his son Robey assumed the role.

== Other activities ==
Estes was an elected member of the Mecklenburg County Board of supervisors, serving for 16 years. He also served as a board member of the First Commonwealth Corporation and the Community Memorial Hospital.

== Personal life ==
=== Marriages and children ===
In December 1919, Estes married Ruth Gladys Berry. They had four daughters and two sons, including:

- Robey Webb Estes (1921–2006)
- Charles Edwin Estes (1923–2015)
- Margaret Estes Hupp (1926–2007)
- Helen Estes Garland (1929–2003)
- Mary Estes Speight (1932–2017)
- Ruth Estes Tanner (1934–2020)

== Death ==
Estes died of complications from diabetes on June 29, 1971, in Richmond, Virginia. He was buried in Woodland Cemetery. At the time of his death, the company had over 650 employees and grossed $10 million annually.

== Legacy ==
Estes Express Lines remains in the ownership of the descendants of Estes. In 2015, the family was listed as No. 149 in America's Richest Families, with a family net worth US$1.7 billion.

Estes Road and the Estes Community Center in Chase City are both named for Estes.
