= Este (São Pedro e São Mamede) =

- Civil parish
- Location in Portugal
- Coordinates: 41.565°N 8.370°W
- Country: Portugal
- Region: Norte
- Intermunic. comm.: Cávado
- District: Braga
- Municipality: Braga

Area
  - Total: 9.79 km^{2} (3.78 sq mi)

Population (2011)
  - Total: 3,837
  - Density: 392/km^{2} (1,020/sq mi)
- Time zone: UTC+00:00 (WET)
  - Summer (DST): UTC+01:00 (WEST)

Este (São Pedro e São Mamede) is a civil parish in the municipality of Braga, Portugal. It was formed in 2013 by the merger of the former parishes São Pedro and São Mamede. The population in 2011 was 3,837, in an area of 9.79 km^{2} (3.78 sq mi). In São Mamede is located the Chamor Hill.

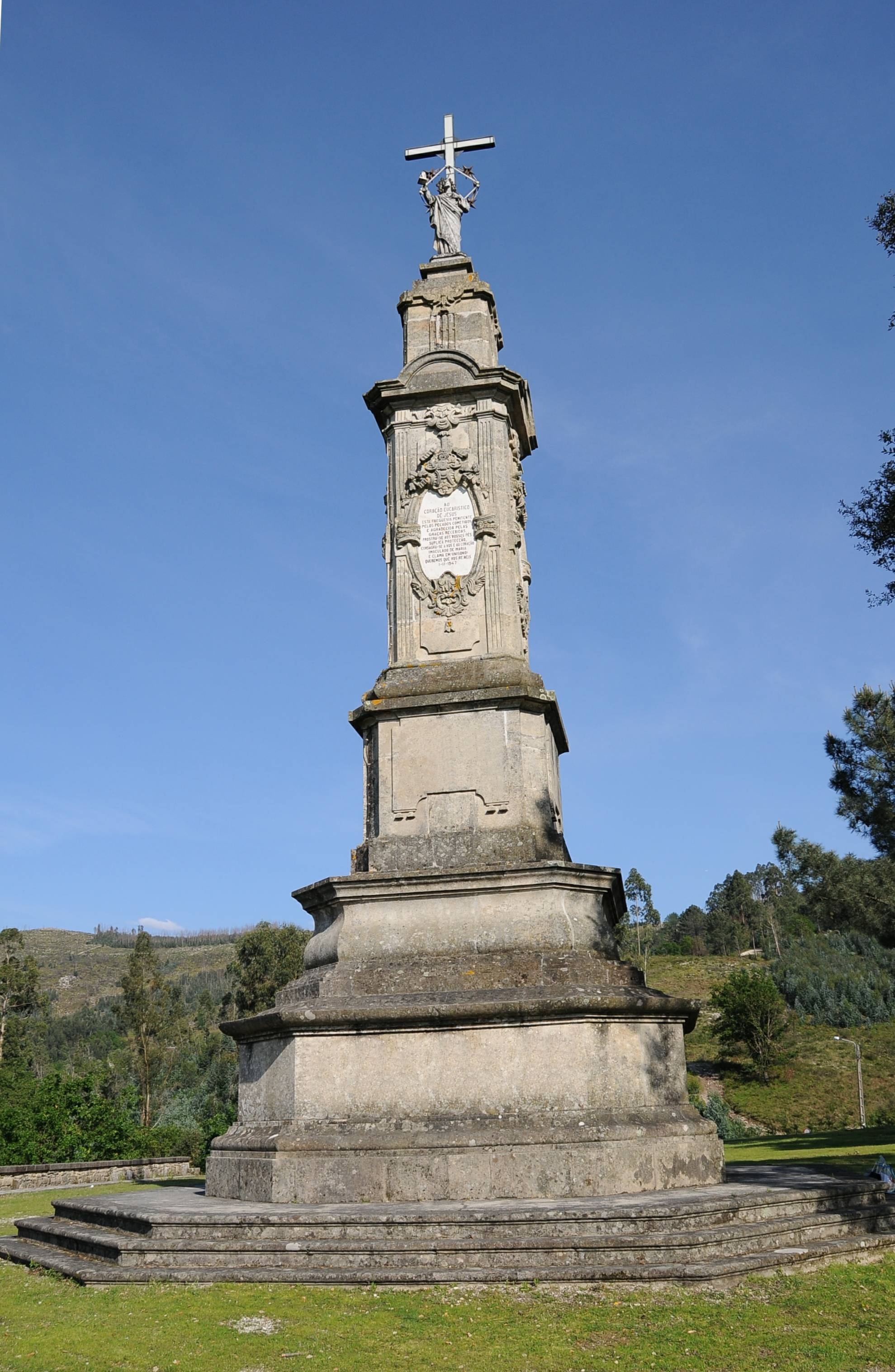
Top of Chamor Hill

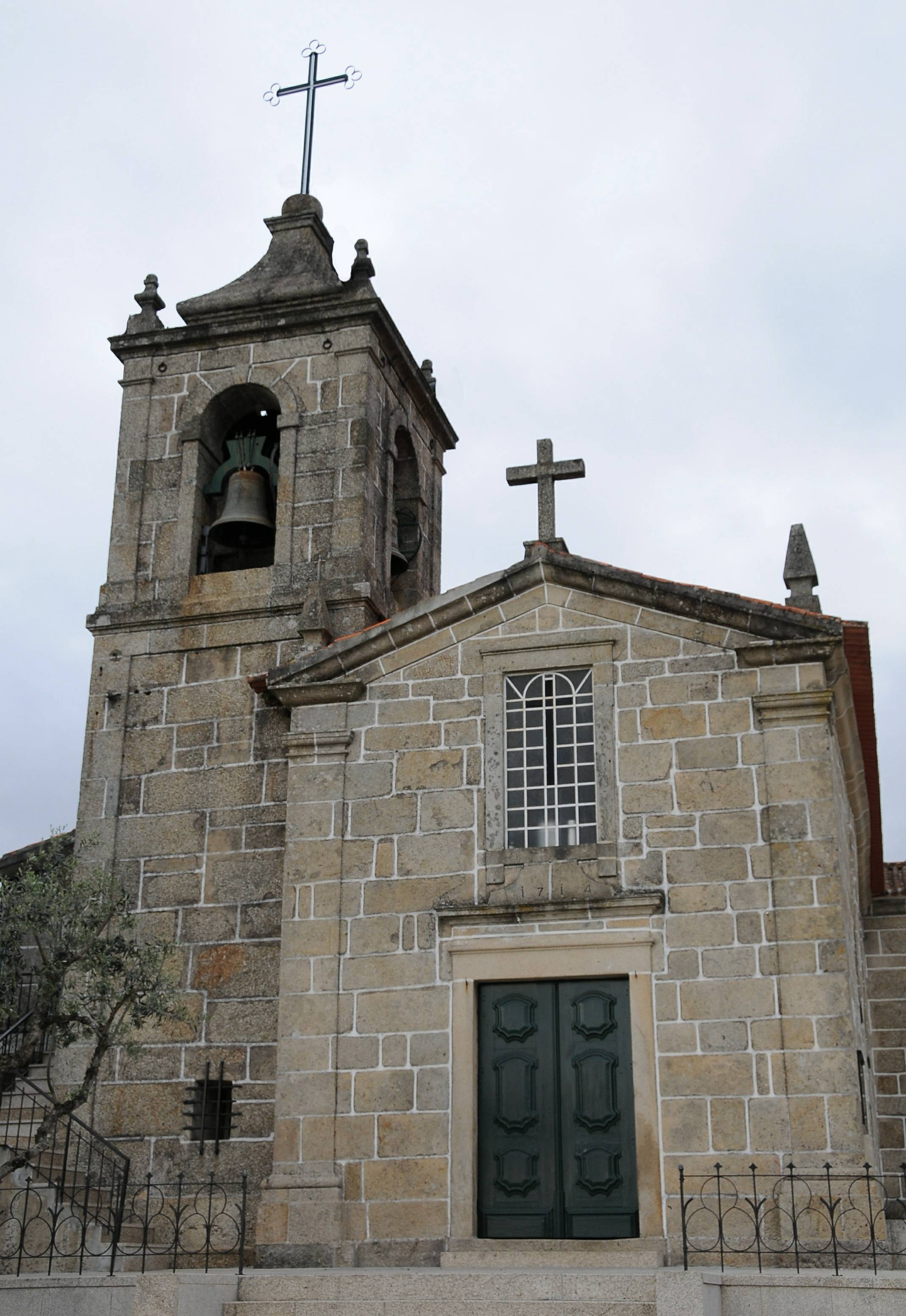
São Pedro de Este Church
