= Estes Express Lines =

American freight transportation company

- Type: Private
- Industry: Freight transport
- Founded: 1931; 95 years ago in Chase City, Virginia, U.S.
- Founder: W. W. Estes
- Headquarters: Richmond, Virginia, U.S.
- Number of locations: 240 terminals (2021)
- Area served: Global
- Key people: Robey Estes, Jr. (CEO); Webb Estes (President)
- Services: Less-than-truckload shipping
- Number of employees: 20,000 (2022)
- Divisions: Estes Level^{2} Logistics; Estes SureMove
- Subsidiaries: Estes Forwarding Worldwide
- Website: estes-express.com

Estes Express Lines is a privately owned American freight transportation provider based in Richmond, Virginia. Founded in 1931 by W. W. Estes, the company is still owned and operated by the Estes family. Robey W. Estes Jr., became the company's president in 1990, then chairman and CEO in 2001. He was succeeded by his son Webb Estes as COO and President in 2023.

Estes is the largest privately held less-than-truckload (LTL) company in the United States. As of February 2022, it had approximately 20,000 employees, more than 6,700 tractors and 30,000 trailers, and a network of over 240 terminals.

== History ==
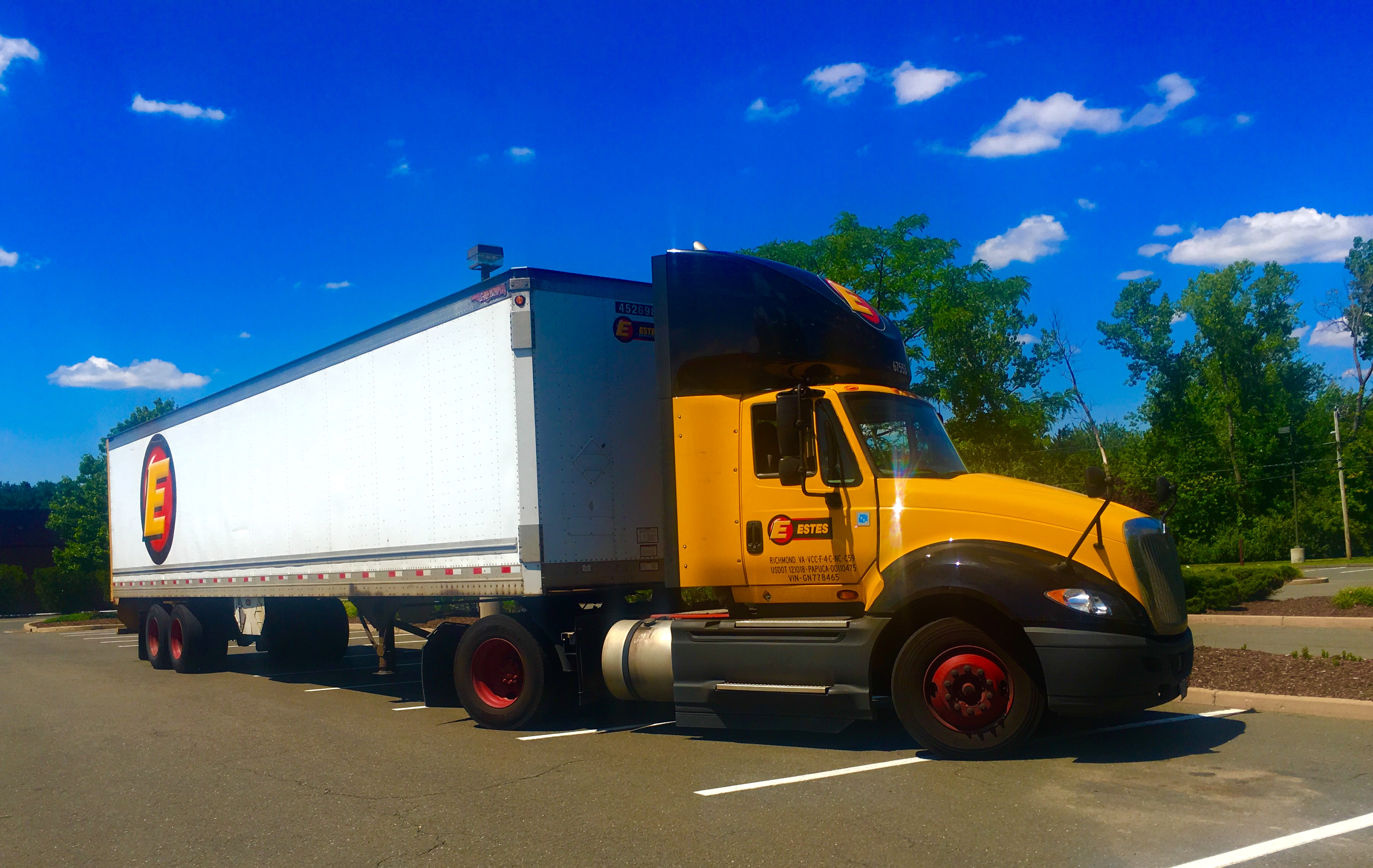
Estes semi-trailer truck in 2016

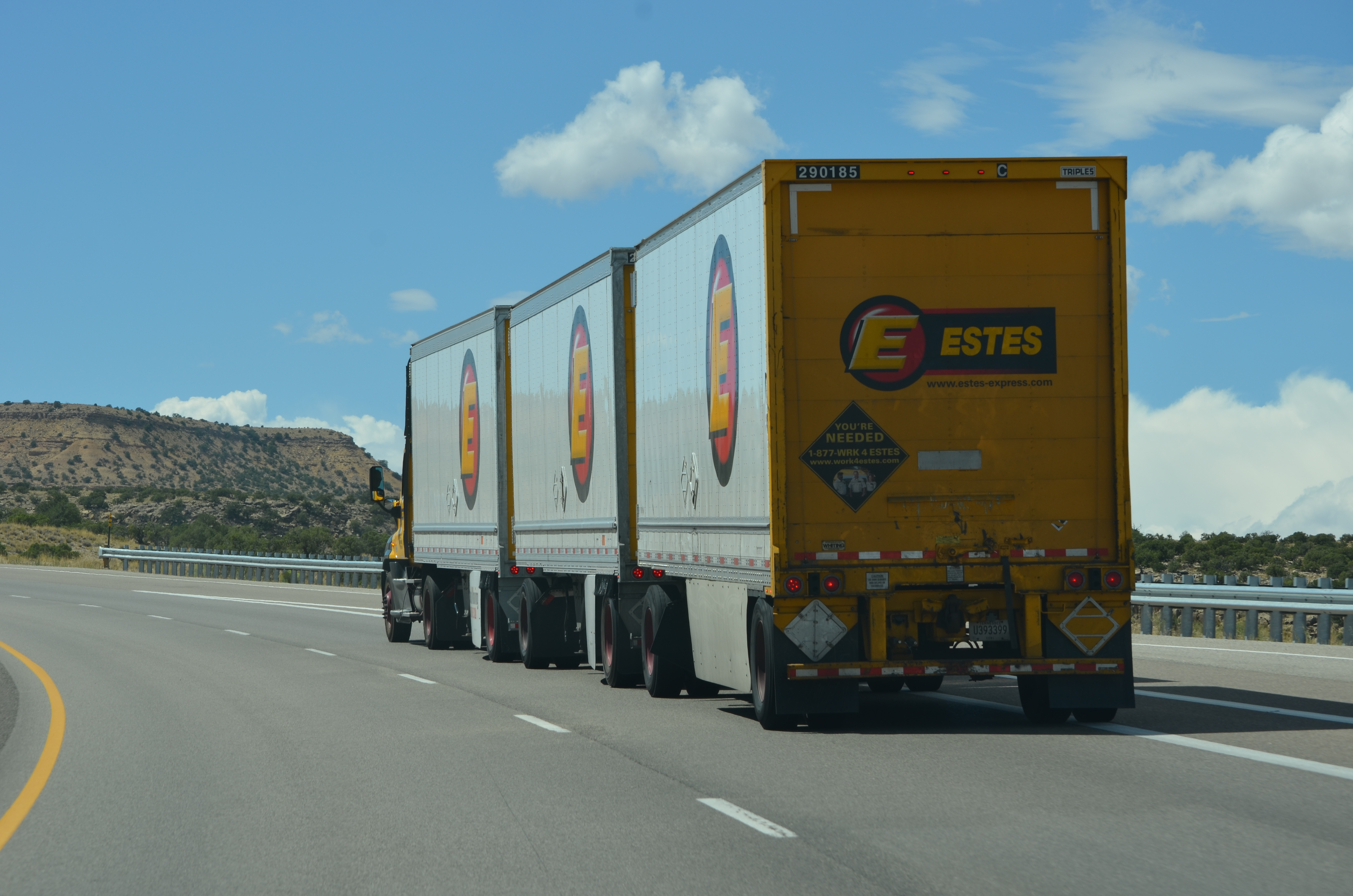
Estes long combination with 3 pups in Utah

The company was founded near Chase City, Virginia, by cotton farmer Webb Wallace ("W.W.") Estes (1897–1971). Estes started providing livestock moving services for local farmers in 1931 with a used Chevrolet truck. By 1932 the trucking business was also hauling general freight and provided enough revenue for Estes to hire his first driver. The following year, Estes opened a home office for the trucking business in Chase City.

The trucking company took on the name Estes Express Lines in 1937 and a year later opened branch terminals in Norfolk and Richmond, Virginia. After outgrowing its original offices and moving to a larger location in Chase City in 1941, the company purchased operating rights for several routes on the Northern Neck of Virginia in 1943. This made Richmond a more central location for the company's operations and in 1946 the company moved its home office to Richmond.

Estes Express Lines was incorporated on 26 November 1948 and by 1953 had over 50 employees with annual revenues of US$695,000. During the early 1950s, the company experienced a series of traffic accidents involving the company's drivers and vehicles which led to the threat of losing its insurance coverage and operating certification. However, the company was able to improve both safety and efficiency sufficiently to allow it to continue to operate and grow its annual revenue to US$1 million by 1957.

Estes expanded to interstate trucking with its 1965 purchase of North Carolina–based Coastal Freight Lines and in 1967 Carolina-Norfolk Truck Lines. During the 1960s the company established terminals in Newport News, South Boston, Springfield, and Winchester. By 1971, the company had terminals in Virginia, North Carolina, and South Carolina, employed approximately 650 people, and had annual revenues of US$10 million. By 1980 it had received operating authority for everywhere east of the Mississippi River.

The company's leadership has been held by the Estes family since its founding. W.W. Estes' son Robey Estes Sr. took on the role of general manager in the early 1950s as W.W. Estes stepped back from operations following a heart attack in 1953. W.W. Estes continued to be the president of the company until his death in 1971 when Robey Estes Sr. took on that role. He subsequently passed the role of president to his son Robey Estes Jr. in 1990. Robey Estes Jr. became the company's chairman and CEO in 2001.

In the late 1990s and early 2000s the company expanded its service area significantly to Canada in 1996 and its first terminal west of the Mississippi in St. Louis, Missouri in 1999. These moves were followed by the addition of services to Puerto Rico, St. Croix and St. Thomas in the Caribbean in 2000 and major commercial markets in Mexico in 2003. It expanded its Caribbean services to additional markets in 2004.

With its acquisition of Los Angeles–based G.I. Trucking in 2005, Estes expanded coverage to 46 states in the US. Estes had held an interline relationship with G.I. since the mid-1990s allowing freight to be transferred between the two companies to effectively expand each company's coverage. Additionally, in 2001, Estes and senior G.I. management had jointly purchased G.I. from its then-owner, Arkansas Best Corporation giving Estes partial ownership of G.I. until it acquired the remaining ownership in 2005. By 2008, Estes had established direct coverage for all 50 US states.

Estes expanded beyond its core LTL services in 2003 by founding an air freight division and in 2012 by establishing a division offering supply chain service for business-to-business (B2B) and business-to-consumer (B2C) logistics called Level^{2} Logistics. The company also launched the Estes SureMove division, an alternative to full-service household moving.

In 2019, Estes acquired South Brunswick, New Jersey–based truckload carrier Eastern Freight Ways and third-party logistics (3PL) provider Carrier Industries, the two most profitable affiliates of bankrupt New England Motor Freight (NEMF). The move expanded Estes' services further beyond its core LTL offering by adding truckload and 3PL services to the flatbed and dedicated transport of Estes' Level^{2} Logistics division. Prior to the acquisition, Estes operated over 6,000 tractors and nearly 30,000 trailers.

In the wake of Yellow Corporation's Chapter 11 bankruptcy and likely liquidation, Estes placed the initial stalking horse bid at $1.3 billion for all of Yellow's terminals.

== Operations ==
In 2016, Estes reported having over 16,000 employees operating 32,500 tractors and trailers with service to the 50 US states and Puerto Rico. The company's revenues were over US$2.39 billion. International delivery services subsidiary Estes Forwarding Worldwide represented 6% of Estes' revenue.

By 2019, the company operated with over 20,000 employees, over 6,000 tractors, and nearly 30,000 trailers.
