= St Andrew's Church, Taunton =

Church in Somerset, England

St Andrew's Church
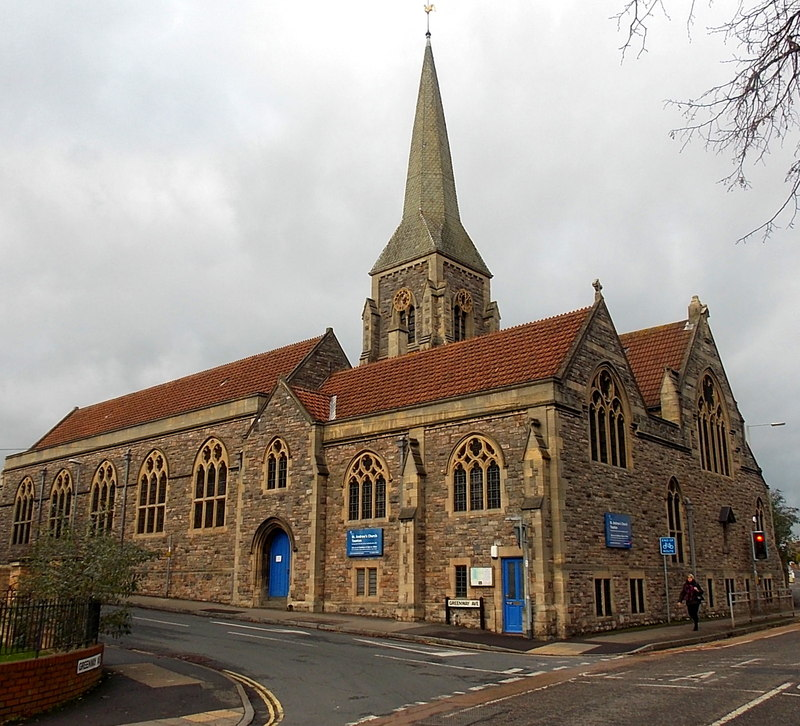
- St Andrew's Church

Religion
- Affiliation: Church of England
- Ecclesiastical or organizational status: Active
- Year consecrated: 1881

Location
- Location: Taunton, Somerset, England
- Interactive map of St Andrew's Church
- Coordinates: 51.0254°N 3.1047°W

Architecture
- Architect: J. Houghton Spencer
- Type: Church

St Andrew's Church is a Church of England church in Taunton, Somerset, England. Designed by J. Houghton Spencer, it was built in 1880–81 and has been a Grade II listed building since 2016.

== History ==
A church to serve the growing district of Rowbarton was first announced in August 1878 when Rev. F. J. Smith pledged £3,000 towards its construction and endowment on the condition that another £2,000 was raised. The remaining money was obtained by public subscription, with £2,300 raised by June 1879. The £3,000 offered by Rev. Smith was provided as a thank-offering to mark the end of the Russo-Turkish War of 1877–78.

The ecclesiastical district of St Andrew's was formed in 1878 and the church plans drawn up by Mr. J. Houghton Spencer of Taunton were accepted the following year. In February 1880, the £2,332 tender of Mr. Henry James Spiller of Taunton was accepted for the church's construction.

The foundation stone was laid on 30 April 1880 by Master E. J. Smith, grandson of Rev. Smith, in the presence of the Bishop of Bath and Wells, Rev. Lord Arthur Hervey, and a large crowd. The parish schoolroom was used for services until the church was completed. St Andrew's was consecrated by the Bishop of Bath and Wells on 14 July 1881.

Owing to the continuing expansion of the parish, additional church accommodation was soon required. A vestry meeting in May 1891 considered enlarging St Andrew's against building an additional church, and opted for the former option. Plans were drawn up by Mr. E. W. Buckle of London and the £3,800 tender of Mr. Henry Spiller accepted in April 1892. The new work included the addition of a south aisle, western porch, morning chapel and choir vestry. The church reopened on 14 July 1893, with the new sections consecrated by Bishop Bromley, assistant of the Bishop of Bath and Wells, who was unable to attend due to ill health.

== Architecture ==
St Andrew's is built of local West Leigh stone, with dressings of Doulting stone and tiled roofs, in the Early English Gothic style. The tower is surmounted by an octagonal, timber-framed spire, which is clad in pale green Westmorland slates and crowned with a copper weather vane. The tower contains one bell, manufactured by John Taylor & Co of Loughborough. The church as originally constructed was made up of a nave with clerestory, north and south aisles, chancel, vestry and south porch. The south aisle, western porch, morning chapel and choir vestry was added in 1892–93.

The interior is built with brick, manufactured in Bridgwater, while the bricks used in the piers of the arcades were made in Exeter and specially chosen for their strength. The chancel and passages were paved with tiles from Mintons and the reredos' tiles manufactured by Craven Dunnill & Co. Ltd of Jackfield. The windows of the chancel and clerestory were painted by Hardman & Co. of Birmingham. The pulpit and font were carved from Beer stone, with the font being the gift of Mr. Spiller. Today the church has a font of 1912 by Bridgeman and Son of Lichfield. The church was designed to accommodate 600 persons on chairs, but these were replaced in favour of open benches of pitch pine, which in turn reduced the accommodation capacity down to 500.

A number of gifts were received by the church when built in 1880–81, including the east window from Mr. John Marshall, the communion table from Mr. A Steevens, the lectern from Mr. G. Steevens, and two Glastonbury chairs, one each from Mr. G. W. Mitchell and Mr. E. Jeboult. The church's organ, built by J. W. Walker & Sons Ltd of London, was unveiled on 7 October 1883. The chancel arch's oak screen was added in 1919 as a World War I memorial. The north aisle contains the "Railway Window", designed by Clare Maryan Green in 2002 to commemorate the parish's links with the railway.

The church was designated a listed building in 2016. Historic England considered the church to be a "strong composition with a good quality interior, with dramatic spatial handling and attention to detail". They also noted the church was little altered since the extension of 1892–93, with many high quality fixtures and furnishings still in place.
