= New England Motor Freight =

Former American trucking company

New England Motor Freight, Inc.
- Type: Private
- Industry: Freight transportation
- Founded: 1918; 108 years ago
- Defunct: 2020
- Fate: Terminated operations due to bankruptcy
- Headquarters: Elizabeth, New Jersey, United States
- Key people: Myron P. "Mike" Shevell (chairman & CEO)
- Owners: Shevell Group
- Website: nemf.com

New England Motor Freight, Inc. (NEMF) was a unionized less-than-truckload (LTL) and truckload freight carrier, based in Elizabeth, New Jersey. It was one of the largest LTL carriers in the US Northeast when it entered Chapter 11 bankruptcy in 2019 and subsequently shut down all operations in 2020.

== History ==
The origins of the company go back to 1918 when a small trucking company began hauling products for the National Biscuit Company (later known as Nabisco) and Fair Lawn Dairies in northern New Jersey. Fair Lawn was later acquired by Bergen County, New Jersey–based Farmland Dairies who also eventually bought the trucking company. At around the time of its acquisition, the carrier was renamed New England Motor Freight (NEMF).

In 1977, Farmland sold NEMF to New Jersey trucking executive Myron "Mike" Shevell. Shevell had started his career in trucking as vice president at the Apex Express trucking company in the 1950s and later operated and managed Associated Transport, which at one point was the United States' largest trucking company, starting in 1974. Associated Transport entered bankruptcy in 1976 and a year later NEMF became part of the Shevell Group, of which Shevell was chairman.

At the time of its acquisition, NEMF was facing significant competition in the Northeast and operated 55 trucks from five terminals. But, over the decades following acquisition and the 1980 deregulation of trucking, NEMF grew substantially especially when compared to other unionized carriers of the time. It continued to provide services in the New York–New Jersey metropolitan area but eventually served as far as Chicago, Canada, and Puerto Rico. In 1986, it bought Interstate Dress Carriers.

== Bankruptcy ==
On February 11, 2019, NEMF filed for Chapter 11 bankruptcy citing rising overhead costs and a shortage of drivers, officially closing its doors one year later. According to the company, the decision to file for bankruptcy and wind down its operations came after two years of losses and an unsuccessful effort to renegotiate credit agreements with its lenders. Its bankruptcy was the largest in the transportation industry since the 2002 bankruptcy of Consolidated Freightways.

In addition to NEMF, the bankruptcy included 10 other Shevell Group companies including NEMF subsidiaries transportation management and freight brokerage firm NEMF Logistics, air and ocean freight forwarder for Puerto Rico NEMF World Transport, and cross border freight service provider NEMF Canada which had served Ontario and Quebec. Additionally, the bankruptcy filings included Shevell Group companies South Brunswick, New Jersey-based dry van and flatbed carrier Eastern Freightways, third-party-logistics provider Carrier Industries Inc., and truckload freight brokerage firm Apex Logistics. While most of these were liquidated, Eastern Freightways and Carrier Industries were acquired out of bankruptcy by Estes Express.

== Operations ==
At the time of its bankruptcy, NEMF was the 17th largest LTL carrier in the US in 2017 with revenues over US$400 million. The company had 3,745 employees including over 1,300 drivers and operated approximately 10,000 pieces of equipment including 1,500 company-owned tractors, an additional 247 owner-operator tractors, and almost 5,600 trailers. It also had 40 terminals across the Northeast, Midwest, and Puerto Rico.

Unlike most LTL carriers whose workers are unionized under the Teamsters Union, NEMF's union workers were mostly under the International Association of Machinists and Aerospace Workers (IAM).

== Controversies ==
=== Accusations of Mafia connections ===
Mike Shevell and NEMF were both accused of having connections to the American Mafia, according to an investigation conducted by the federal government. In a racketeering suit filed by the US Attorney in 1988 Shevell was accused of making Mafia payoffs and having an eleven-year corrupt relationship with Tony Provenzano, a Genovese family mobster and former union leader who was convicted of racketeering and murder. The matter was settled with no admission of wrongdoing.

=== Alleged inadequate termination notice ===
Following NEMF's bankruptcy, the company was sued by a group of approximately 350 employees claiming they had not received adequate notice of termination in violation of the federal WARN Act which requires 60 days notice of mass layoffs. Employees also claimed they were owed additional wages and accrued vacation time. This resulted in the company increasing its termination package to employees to a total of US$15.7 million from an initial severance offering of US$13 million. Following the company's move to increase severance pay, the employees dropped their suit alleging WARN Act violations.
