= Estes, Virginia =

Unincorporated community in Virginia, US

Coordinates: 38°37′10″N 78°03′40″W

Estes is an unincorporated community in Rappahannock County, in the U.S. state of Virginia.
