= Warm and Beautiful =

Song by Wings

from the album Wings at the Speed of Sound
- Published: McCartney Music Ltd.
- Released: 25 March 1976
- Recorded: 2 February 1976
- Genre: Rock
- Length: 3:12
- Label: MPL Communications (UK); MPL Communications/Capitol (US)
- Songwriters: Paul McCartney; Linda McCartney
- Producer: Paul McCartney

Wings at the Speed of Sound track listing
- 11 tracks Side one: 1. "Let 'Em In"; 2. "The Note You Never Wrote"; 3. "She's My Baby"; 4. "Beware My Love"; 5. "Wino Junko"; Side two: 6. "Silly Love Songs"; 7. "Cook of the House"; 8. "Time to Hide"; 9. "Must Do Something About It"; 10. "San Ferry Anne"; 11. "Warm and Beautiful"

"Warm and Beautiful" is a love ballad credited to Paul and Linda McCartney that was first released by Wings on their 1976 album Wings at the Speed of Sound. It is a love ballad sung by Paul directed to Linda. Critical opinion of the song has varied widely, ranging from a comment that it is "one of the most beautiful songs that Paul ever wrote for Linda," to a suggestion that it may be "one of the worst songs Paul McCartney has ever written." In 1998, after Linda's death, Paul rearranged the song for string quartet to be played at memorial concerts for his late wife. This version was included on the 1999 album Working Classical. The song was also included on the 2016 compilation album Pure McCartney.

== Lyrics and music ==
"Warm and Beautiful" is a love song, the inspirational subject of whom is Linda McCartney. Paul McCartney sings the lead vocal. The Rough Guide to the Beatles author Chris Ingham describes "Warm and Beautiful" as a "big sensitive ballad." The verses treat love as being eternal and proclaim that love, faith and hope are what allow people to transcend sadness. The bridge uses images of sunlit mornings and moonlit water as metaphors for love.

The song is in the key of C major. The verses are in two phrases. Music professor Vincent Benitez finds the melody and harmony of the song particularly expressive. The melody of the first phrase begins on the tonic, C, goes up to the subdominant F, and concludes be descending to D. The melody of the second phrase of each verse is similar, except it ends with the sequence of a diminished seventh note followed by an ascending second, i.e., A flat up to B up to C. The melody of the bridge incorporates both leaps and steps, often going in opposite directions. Elements of the melodic structure are similar to those McCartney has used throughout his career, dating back to the Beatles arrangement of "Falling in Love Again" that they used in their 1962 concerts in Hamburg.

Chip Madiger and Mark Easter claim that the instrumental track of "Warm and Beautiful" includes two euphoniums. Luca Perasi in his book Paul McCartney: Recording Sessions (1969–2013) reports an interview with arranger Fiachra Trench, who recalls they used two tenor horns and a string quartet. However, John Blaney lists the only instruments on the track as Paul McCartney's piano and Denny Laine's and Jimmy McCulloch's guitars.

Rolling Stone critic Stephen Holden believes that the opening chords of "Warm and Beautiful" are a parody of John Lennon's song "Imagine." Similarly, Holden believes that the simple lyrics and melody are a parody of Lennon's song "Love."

"Warm and Beautiful" was originally considered for release as a single from Wings at the Speed of Sound, but was passed up in favour of "Let 'Em In" and "Silly Love Songs."

== Critical reception ==
Critical reception of "Warm and Beautiful" has been mixed. Elvis Costello has stated that "Warm and Beautiful" is "one of the most beautiful songs that Paul ever wrote for Linda." Billboard Magazine's Timothy White considers the song one of McCartney's post-Beatle peaks. Benitez describes the song as "sentimental, idealistic, but compelling."

Chris Ingham has a mixed reaction, stating that "Warm and Beautiful" has a "typically attractive melody" but claims that it is "uncharacteristically overstated." Author John Blaney notes that the song represents McCartney "at his most idealistic," but notes that depending on the listener's point of view the main melody may be either "compelling or tedious," but Blaney believes that the melody rescues the song. Author Tim Riley acknowledges that the song is "a potentially gorgeous ballad" but suggests that it be "revised and saved from its unfinished limbo." Chip Madiger and Mark Easter claim that only McCartney's "labored vocal performance" prevents the song from being among "the prettier songs Paul wrote for Linda." They also feel that the string quartet version works better than the original. Billboard said that "Warm and Beautiful" "is one of [McCartney's] patented love ballads that should become a standard."

Pop music author Robert Rodriguez considers the song album filler and writes that the song "failed to reach the level of romantic poignancy that its composer usually reached effortlessly. Rolling Stone's Stephen Holden considers the song overly didactic, stating that it serves up "with apparent sincerity, the stalest pop ballad clichés ever to emerge from an English music hall." Holden suggests that McCartney may be using the song to make an ironic point about clichés, such as that these clichés will outlast pop music that critics consider art or that he can "transcend cliché by being the biggest cliché," but notes that alternatively it may just be "one of the worst songs Paul McCartney has ever written."

== Personnel ==
Sources:

- Paul McCartney – vocals, piano
- Denny Laine – slide guitar
- Jimmy McCulloch – slide guitar
- Fiachra Trench – string quartet, tenor flugelhorn

== String quartet version ==
In 1998, after Linda McCartney's death, Paul McCartney rearranged the song for string quartet to be played at memorial concerts for his late wife. The Brodsky Quartet performed the song at memorial services in London, and the Loma Mar Quartet performed the song at memorial services in New York. The Loma Mar Quartet also recorded the string quartet version of the song for the 1999 album Working Classical.
