= Must Do Something About It =

Song by Wings

from the album Wings at the Speed of Sound
- Published: McCartney Music Ltd.
- Released: 25 March 1976
- Recorded: 5 January 1976
- Genre: Soft rock
- Length: 3:42
- Label: MPL Communications (UK); MPL Communications/Capitol (US)
- Songwriters: Paul McCartney; Linda McCartney
- Producer: Paul McCartney

Wings at the Speed of Sound track listing
- 11 tracks Side one: 1. "Let 'Em In"; 2. "The Note You Never Wrote"; 3. "She's My Baby"; 4. "Beware My Love"; 5. "Wino Junko"; Side two: 6. "Silly Love Songs"; 7. "Cook of the House"; 8. "Time to Hide"; 9. "Must Do Something About It"; 10. "San Ferry Anne"; 11. "Warm and Beautiful"

"Must Do Something About It" is a song credited to Paul and Linda McCartney that first appeared on the Wings 1976 album Wings at the Speed of Sound.

== Recording ==
The lead vocal was sung by Wings drummer Joe English rather than by McCartney, the only Wings song on which English was the lead vocalist. This was part of McCartney's attempt to democratize the band; each of the five members of Wings had at least one lead vocal on Wings at the Speed of Sound. McCartney decided to have English perform the lead vocal after the backing track had been recorded. A version of the song was recorded at the time with McCartney on lead vocal and remained unreleased until November 2014, when it was included as a bonus track on the remastered album.

== Lyrics and music ==
The song's lyrics tell of the singer's loneliness. In each verse, the singer sings about some aspect of his lonely life, including watching a sunset by himself or playing cards alone. In the chorus, the singer sings that he "must do something about" his loneliness, and the phrase "must do something about it" is repeated several times throughout the song. The music reinforces the meaning of the lyrics. The length of the verses is an asymmetric five bars, emphasizing the instability of the singer's loneliness, while the chorus is a symmetric four bars, emphasizing the hoped for stability when the singer does something about it. The harmony in the chorus is also more stable than that in the verses. Instrumentation for the song includes acoustic guitar and slide guitar. The song is in the key of D major, although the guitar is capoed and tuned to sound more like E-flat major.

== Reception ==
Most commentators have remarked on English's singing. Robert Rodriguez wrote that English's vocals added "a needed authenticity" to the song and wasn't sure that McCartney's vocals would have been as convincing. Allmusic's Donald Guarisco states that "English sings the song with gusto, moving back and forth between a full-throated belting style and a gentle croon with ease." Vincent Benitez wrote that English's singing "conveys a surprisingly sunny disposition." Chris Ingham claims that English "does a charming job." John Blaney felt that English "provided the biggest surprise on the album" and that his "performance is on par with anything on the album, and it's debatable whether anyone could have improved on it." Blaney argues that the song is a perfect vehicle for English, and that his voice perfectly conveys the feel McCartney was looking for.

On the song itself, Rodriguez claims that it was "tossed off simply to fill space on an LP." Chip Madinger and Mark Easter, while saying English has a "passable voice," state that "Must Do Something About It" is "an agreeable if not particularly memorable song." However, AllMusic's Guarisco calls the song a "nice little ballad whose pop undertones allow it to stick in the listener’s mind."

== Personnel ==
- Joe English – vocals, drums, percussion
- Paul McCartney – bass, shaker
- Jimmy McCulloch – electric guitar
- Linda McCartney – tambourine
- Denny Laine – acoustic guitar
