= She's My Baby (Wings song) =

Song by Wings

from the album Wings at the Speed of Sound
- Published: McCartney Music Ltd.
- Released: 25 March 1976
- Recorded: 7 January 1976
- Genre: Pop
- Length: 3:06
- Label: MPL Communications (UK); MPL Communications/Capitol (US)
- Songwriters: Paul McCartney; Linda McCartney
- Producer: Paul McCartney

Wings at the Speed of Sound track listing
- 11 tracks Side one: 1. "Let 'Em In"; 2. "The Note You Never Wrote"; 3. "She's My Baby"; 4. "Beware My Love"; 5. "Wino Junko"; Side two: 6. "Silly Love Songs"; 7. "Cook of the House"; 8. "Time to Hide"; 9. "Must Do Something About It"; 10. "San Ferry Anne"; 11. "Warm and Beautiful"

"She's My Baby" is a song credited to Paul and Linda McCartney that was first released by Wings on their 1976 album Wings at the Speed of Sound. It is a love song sung by Paul directed at Linda. Critical opinion of the song has ranged from a description as Paul McCartney's "sweetest, daftest love song" to a suggestion that it deserves an "honor for sheer awfulness." In 1998, after Linda's death, Paul McCartney rearranged the song for string quartet to be played at memorial concerts for his late wife. This version was included on the 1999 album Working Classical. The song was included in the deluxe edition of the compilation album Wings in 2025.

== Lyrics and music ==
"She's My Baby" is a love song inspired by Linda. Paul McCartney sings the lead vocal. In each of the verses, the song describes characteristics of the singer's "baby." Some of these have been criticized as being trite; for example, the woman is described as gravy to be mopped up by the singer:

Like gravy, down to the last drop
I keep mopping her up
Oh yeah, she's my baby

The verses are in the key of C major. The bridge begins in the key of F major, which is the subdominant key to the verses, and ends on a dominant seventh chord on G major, which is the dominant of C, facilitating the transition back to the verse. Like the hit singles from Wings at the Speed of Sound, "Let 'Em In" and "Silly Love Songs," the bass guitar is prominent in the mix. This was done intentionally to make the song more danceable. Paul McCartney has stated that "That is the bass in your face. And that was really because we were making a dance record."

== Critical reception ==
Critical reaction to "She's My Baby" has been very mixed. The Rough Guide to the Beatles author Chris Ingham calls "She's My Baby" McCartney's "sweetest, daftest love song." Chip Madiger and Mark Easter lament that on Wings at the Speed of Sound "She's My Baby" is crossfaded with the following song on the album, "Beware My Love." This limited radio play of a song they consider one of the best on the album, albeit "lightweight and jaunty." Robert Christgau claimed that "'She's My Baby' sounds like an outtake from the 'white' double-LP by McCartney's former group, the Beatles.

Other critics are less kind. Reviewing Wings at the Speed of Sound, Allmusic critic Stephen Thomas Erlewine states that "'She's My Baby' play like the hits, only without memorable hooks." Fab Four FAQ 2.0 author Robert Rodriguez calls the song "hackneyed" and suggests that it "must earn some kind of honor for sheer awfulness." Music professor Vincent Benitez acknowledges that the song is "danceable," but also calls it "superficial" and "an inane pop song with trite lyrics and images."

== Personnel ==
According to the author Luca Perasi:

- Paul McCartney – lead vocals, electric piano, electric guitar
- Denny Laine – backing vocals, bass
- Joe English – drums

== String quartet version ==
In 1998, after Linda McCartney's death, Paul McCartney rearranged the song for string quartet to be played at memorial concerts for his late wife. The Brodsky Quartet performed the song at memorial services in London, and the Loma Mar Quartet performed the song at memorial services in New York. The Loma Mar Quartet also recorded the string quartet version of the song for the 1999 album Working Classical.
