= Silly Love Songs =

1976 single by Wings

- Dutch single sleeve

Single by Wings

from the album Wings at the Speed of Sound
- B-side: "Cook of the House"
- Released: 1 April 1976
- Recorded: 16 & 19 January; 20 & 25 February 1976
- Studio: Abbey Road, London
- Genre: Disco; funk
- Length: 5:54 (album version); 3:28 (American promo radio edit)
- Label: Parlophone; Capitol
- Songwriters: Paul McCartney; Linda McCartney
- Producer: Paul McCartney

Wings singles chronology
"Venus and Mars/Rock Show" (1975)	"Silly Love Songs" (1976)	"Let 'Em In" (1976)

Wings at the Speed of Sound track listing
- 11 tracks Side one: 1. "Let 'Em In"; 2. "The Note You Never Wrote"; 3. "She's My Baby"; 4. "Beware My Love"; 5. "Wino Junko"; Side two: 6. "Silly Love Songs"; 7. "Cook of the House"; 8. "Time to Hide"; 9. "Must Do Something About It"; 10. "San Ferry Anne"; 11. "Warm and Beautiful"

Music video
- "Silly Love Songs" on YouTube

"Silly Love Songs" is a song by the British rock band Wings that was written by Paul and Linda McCartney. The song first appeared in March 1976 on the album Wings at the Speed of Sound, and was then released as a single backed with "Cook of the House" on 1 April in the US and 30 April in the UK. Written in response to music critics accusing McCartney of predominantly writing lightweight "silly love songs", it is a disco and funk song led by a melodic bass line, with horns and string arrangements.

Despite mixed reviews from critics, the song was a major commercial success, topping the US Billboard Hot 100 for five non-consecutive weeks, being certified gold by the Recording Industry Association of America (RIAA). In the UK, it peaked at number two. The song was performed live throughout the Wings Over the World tour, although McCartney has not performed it since the dissolution of Wings in 1981.

== Writing ==
Paul McCartney wrote "Silly Love Songs" between November and December 1975 while on holiday in Hawaii, where he also wrote "Girls' School" and "Must Do Something About It". He recorded a piano demo of "Silly Love Songs" shortly after, with most of the final song's melodies in place. McCartney wrote the song as a rebuttal to music critics (and his former Beatles bandmate, John Lennon) who had criticised McCartney for writing lightweight love songs and "sentimental slush". He said in an interview that at the time, music charts were dominated by heavier material, such as Alice Cooper, thinking that love ballads were becoming "soppy" and love was "too sentimental". But he asked himself, "what's wrong with that?" The author Tim Riley suggests that in the song, McCartney is inviting "his audience to have a laugh [at] him", as Elvis Presley had sometimes done. In his book The Lyrics: 1956 to the Present (2021), McCartney affirmed that he was given a reputation that he "had to stand up for". He further said in the book Wings: The Story of a Band on the Run (2025) that he believed silly love songs "give people hope", an idea he was quite fond of. In a 2001 interview with Billboard, McCartney said:

[O]ver the years people have said, "Aw, he sings love songs, he writes love songs, he's so soppy at times." I thought, Well, I know what they mean, but, people have been doing love songs forever. I like 'em, other people like 'em, and there's a lot of people I love — I'm lucky enough to have that in my life. So the idea was that "you" may call them silly, but what's wrong with that? The song was, in a way, to answer people who just accuse me of being soppy. The nice payoff now is that a lot of the people I meet who are at the age where they've just got a couple of kids and have grown up a bit, settling down, they'll say to me, "I thought you were really soppy for years, but I get it now! I see what you were doing!"

== Composition ==
"Silly Love Songs" is a disco and funk song, with elements of dance. Beatles author Robert Rodriguez described the song as "a dance track masquerading as a pop tune". It is in the key of C major and has a complex song structure, alternating between verse–chorus–bridge, with an intro and instrumental breaks. It is led by a prominent bass guitar line, augmented by strings and horns. The song includes a build-up of multiple vocal parts sung in counterpoint, similar to the Beach Boys' "God Only Knows" (1966), a song that McCartney cited as his favourite of all time. Some authors have compared its music to the soul singer Al Green, specifically his song "Sha-La-La (Make Me Happy)" (1974), which also features strings, horns and a prominent melodic bass line.

Lyrically, it is a love song in which McCartney argues that listeners still crave "silly love songs" while celebrating the love he and his wife Linda McCartney share. Paul intended for the song to convey a deeper meaning: "You see, I'm looking at love not from the perspective of 'oh, boring old love,' I'm looking at it like when you get married and have a baby or something, that kind of love. I mean, that's pretty strong; it's not lurve, that stuff; it's something deeper." In The Lyrics, McCartney explained that love "makes life better" and that being cynical is easy, but believed that "a lot of people who are cynical about love haven't been lucky enough to feel it."

== Recording ==
Recording for "Silly Love Songs" began on 16 January 1976 at Abbey Road Studios in London, during the sessions for Wings at the Speed of Sound. The basic track was recorded first, with Paul on piano and vocals and Joe English on drums. Wings' other members – Linda McCartney, Denny Laine and Jimmy McCulloch – watched from the control room, along with Barbara Charone of Sounds magazine, who was invited to document the session. After a few takes, Charone interviewed Paul and Linda, during which they discussed the band and the new song. After the interview, Paul overdubbed a bass guitar part, which turned the song from a ballad into a disco and funk song. Paul explained: "I wanted to have a melody on bass. We really pushed the bass and drums right out front. But it drove the song along nicely. ... We wanted to make something you could dance to." According to engineer Peter Henderson, Paul came up with the bass part on the spot in the studio. Work on the song continued on 19 January, when the band overdubbed extra percussion and harmony vocals by the McCartneys, Laine and English, who sang a high falsetto part. According to Henderson, English's singing impressed Paul so much it may have led to English singing lead vocals on "Must Do Something About It".

Overdubs continued in mid-to-late February 1976. On 20 February, Paul recorded his lead vocal using an automatic double tracking technique to make it sound double-tracked. The brass and string players recorded their parts on 25 February. The brass section was Howie Casey and Thaddeus Richard on saxophone, Steve Howard on trumpet and Tony Dorsey on trombone. According to Casey, Paul did not write charts for them; instead, he played his ideas on piano, which the group divided up. Dorsey composed the string parts with little guidance from Paul. The song was mixed between 26 and 29 February.

== Release ==
"Silly Love Songs" was first released on Wings at the Speed of Sound on 25 March 1976 in the US, and a week later in the UK. Despite Capitol Records' requests for a single, McCartney initially refused to release any, telling a journalist: "We've released the album before any singles, mainly because the radio stations haven't been told what our preference is, and they can decide for themselves. And they'll play various cuts and see which rises to the surface." Nevertheless, it was agreed that a single would help sell tickets for the upcoming Wings Over the World tour, so McCartney chose "Silly Love Songs" as the first single, with "Cook of the House" as the B-side.

"Silly Love Songs" was released as a single in the US on 1 April 1976 through Capitol. The commercial single was the full-length song, while a shorter promotional edit, running 3:28, was sent to US radio stations. It spent five non-consecutive weeks at number 1 on the Billboard Hot 100, briefly interrupted by Diana Ross's "Love Hangover". The song was the number 1 pop song in Billboard's year-end charts of 1976; it was also the group's second of three number ones on the Easy Listening chart. The single was certified gold by the Recording Industry Association of America (RIAA) for sales of over one million copies. In 2014, Billboard listed "Silly Love Songs" as Paul McCartney's all-time biggest Hot 100 single.

The single was released in the UK on 30 April 1976 through Parlophone and reached number 2 on the UK Singles Chart, kept off the top spot by the novelty song "The Combine Harvester" by the English Scrumpy and Western group the Wurzels. "Silly Love Songs" also reached No. 1 on the Irish Singles Chart on 27 May.

=== Later releases ===
"Silly Love Songs" has since appeared on multiple McCartney compilation albums, including Wings Greatest (1978), All the Best! (1987), Wingspan: Hits and History (2001), Pure McCartney (2016) and Wings (2025). It was also featured on The 7" Singles Box in 2022. To promote Wingspan: Hits and History, Paul McCartney commissioned three remixes, which were released in various forms across Europe. McCartney's original demo of the song was also featured on the Paul McCartney Archive Collection reissue of Wings at the Speed of Sound in 2014.

A live recording from the Wings Over the World tour, made on 25 May 1976 at Madison Square Garden, was released on the live album Wings over America (1976). Following this tour, McCartney never performed the song live again. In 1984, three years after the dissolution of Wings, McCartney re-recorded "Silly Love Songs" for the soundtrack to the film Give My Regards to Broad Street. This recording features a faster tempo, has more funk elements and a different structure.

== Critical reception ==
According to the authors Allan Kozinn and Adrian Sinclair, critical reviews were "a measure of the value critics placed on [McCartney's] love songs". Multiple critics thought the song was silly, although several praised the production and instrumentation. Record World said that "all the ingredients of a sure chart-topper are wrapped up in this delightful, fast moving number" with "awesome hooks". Sue Bryom of Record Mirror called the song a good choice for a single, finding it more commercial than Wings' previous singles, describing it as "bright and bouncy and just right if you're feeling a bit daft."

Other critics were milder. Music critic Robert Christgau called the two tracks "charming if lightweight singles", while Rolling Stone critic Stephen Holden said "Silly Love Songs" was "a clever retort whose point is well taken". Melody Maker's Carolyn Coon said the song's "not very nice" and "[is] all OK until [Paul] starts singing", while Jonh Ingham of Sounds said: "What could have been a brilliant song remains half formulated." Time said it was "the sort of tune that comes at the unwary out of car radios and open windows, attaching itself like a particularly stubborn lap cat. It will probably never go away..."

Retrospectively, AllMusic's Stephen Thomas Erlewine described the song, as well as its follow-up single, "Let 'Em In", as "so lightweight that their lack of substance seems nearly defiant". John Bergstrom of PopMatters called the song "an exemplary piece of mid-'70s pop production and a pure pleasure". AllMusic's Jason Elias called the bass line one of McCartney's finest. The author Tom Montgomery praised the production and called it an overall "pretty good song", but felt the subject matter was "banal". In a 2017 about ballads, the professor David Metzger analysed "Silly Love Songs", although not a ballad, but as a love song. He wrote: "The best response to [McCartney's] critics is taking the line 'I love you', one so common that many songs avoid it, and setting it to a memorable hook. As McCartney's song shows, there are a lot of romance and good times to be had in clichés, especially in silly love songs." In 2020, Rolling Stone ranked it McCartney's 15th best solo song.

In 2008, "Silly Love Songs" was ranked number 31 on Billboard's list of the 100 all-time top songs of the Hot 100, commemorating the 50th anniversary of the Billboard Hot 100 chart.

== Personnel ==
Personnel per Andrew Grant Jackson, except where noted.

- Paul McCartney – lead and backing vocals, bass, piano, producer
- Linda McCartney – backing vocals, keyboards
- Denny Laine – guitar, backing vocals
- Jimmy McCulloch – guitar
- Joe English – drums
- Howie Casey – saxophone
- Thaddeus Richard – saxophone
- Steve Howard – trumpet
- Tony Dorsey – trombone
- Unknown musicians – orchestra

== Charts ==
=== Weekly charts ===
Chart (1976)	Peak position
Australia (Kent Music Report)	20
Canada Top Singles (RPM)	1
Canada Adult Contemporary (RPM)	1
Germany (GfK)	14
Ireland (IRMA)	1
Japan (Oricon)	66
Netherlands (Dutch Top 40)	13
Netherlands (Single Top 100)	11
New Zealand (Recorded Music NZ)	8
Norway (VG-lista)	9
UK Singles (Official Charts)	2
US Billboard Hot 100	1
US Adult Contemporary (Billboard)	1

=== Year-end charts ===
Chart (1976)	Position
Canada Top Singles (RPM)	10
UK Singles (Official Charts Company)	23
US Billboard Hot 100	1
US Billboard Easy Listening	33

=== All-time charts ===
Chart (1958–2018)	Position
US Billboard Hot 100	40

== Certifications ==
Region	Certification	Certified units/sales
New Zealand (RMNZ)	Gold	15,000^{‡}
United States (RIAA)	Gold	1,000,000^{^}
^{^} Shipments figures based on certification alone.^{‡} Sales+streaming figures based on certification alone.

== Ardijah version ==
"Silly Love Songs"

Single by Ardijah

from the album Time
- Released: January 1999
- Genre: R&B
- Length: 5:55
- Label: PolyFonk
- Songwriters: Paul McCartney; Linda McCartney

Ardijah singles chronology
"Love So Right" (1999)	"Silly Love Songs" (1999)	"Do 2 You" (1999)

Audio
- "Silly Love Songs" on YouTube

In 1999, New Zealand music group Ardijah released an R&B version of "Silly Love Songs". Their cover debuted at number 22 on New Zealand's RIANZ Singles Chart on 17 January 1999, rising to number nine the following week. It then moved up to number three, where it stayed for two weeks, and reached number one on 14 February, becoming the band's highest-charting single in their home country as well as their first top-10 hit since "Watchin' U" in 1988. "Silly Love Songs" logged 17 weeks on the New Zealand chart in total and was certified gold for selling over 5,000 copies.

=== Charts ===
Chart (1999)	Peak position
New Zealand (Recorded Music NZ)	1

=== Certifications ===
Region	Certification	Certified units/sales
New Zealand (RMNZ)	Gold	5,000^{*}
^{*} Sales figures based on certification alone.

== Other covers ==
- In a 1995 appearance on Late Show with David Letterman, Soul Asylum lead singer Dave Pirner uses a trumpet to interpolate the horn break in “Silly Love Songs” with his band's “Misery” before the show's musical director Paul Shaffer intervened.
- In 1996, rock group Red House Painters performed the song on their album Songs for a Blue Guitar.
- Wings band member Denny Laine covered "Silly Love Songs" on his album Wings at the Speed of Denny Laine.
- In 2011, the song is featured in the Valentine's Day episode of Glee, which is also titled after the song. The song was performed by Darren Criss (who plays Blaine Anderson), while all-male a cappella group Beelzebubs sang the background vocals.

== See also ==
- List of Billboard Hot 100 number ones of 1976
- List of Billboard Easy Listening number ones of 1976
- List of number-one singles from the 1990s (New Zealand) § 1999

== Bibliography ==
- Benitez Jr., Vincent P. (2010). The Words and Music of Paul McCartney: The Solo Years. Santa Barbara, California: Praeger. ISBN 978-0-313-34969-0.
- Blaney, John (2007). Lennon and McCartney: Together Alone. London: Jawbone Press. ISBN 978-1-906002-02-2.
- Bronson, Fred (2003). The Billboard Book of Number 1 Hits (5th ed.). New York City: Billboard Books. ISBN 978-0823076772.
- Elson, Howard (1986). McCartney: Songwriter. London: W. H. Allen & Co. ISBN 978-0-49103-325-1.
- Jackson, Andrew (2012). Still the Greatest: The Essential Solo Beatles Songs. Scarecrow Press. ISBN 978-0-8108-8222-5.
- Kozinn, Allan; Sinclair, Adrian (2024). The McCartney Legacy Volume 2: 1974–80. New York City: Deyst. ISBN 978-0-06-300075-9.
- Madinger, Chip; Easter, Mark (2000). Eight Arms to Hold You: The Solo Beatles Compendium. Chesterfield, MO: 44.1 Productions. ISBN 978-0-615-11724-9.
- Metzger, David (2017). The Ballad in American Popular Music. Cambridge: Cambridge University Press. ISBN 978-1-107-16152-8.
- McCartney, Paul (2021). Muldoon, Paul (ed.). The Lyrics: 1956 to the Present. New York City: Liveright. ISBN 978-1631492563.
- McCartney, Paul (2025). Widmer, Ted (ed.). Wings: The Story of a Band on the Run. New York City: Liveright. ISBN 978-1-324-09630-6.
- McGee, Garry (2003). Band on the Run: A History of Paul McCartney and Wings. New York: Taylor Trade Publishing. ISBN 0-87833-304-5.
- Montgomery, Ted (2020). The Paul McCartney Catalog: A Complete Annotated Discography of Solo Works, 1967–2019. Jefferson, North Carolina: McFarland & Company. ISBN 978-1-4766-3801-0.
- Nobile, Drew (2020). Form as Harmony in Rock Music. Oxford University Press. ISBN 978-0-19-094838-2.
- Perasi, Luca (2023). Paul McCartney: Music Is Ideas. The Stories Behind the Songs (Vol. 1) 1970–1989. Milan: L.I.L.Y. Publishing. ISBN 978-88-909122-9-0.
- Riley, Tim (2002). Tell Me Why: The Beatles: Album By Album, Song By Song, The Sixties And After. Da Capo. ISBN 9780306811203.
- Rodriguez, Robert (2010). Fab Four FAQ 2.0: The Beatles' Solo Years, 1970–1980. Milwaukee, WI: Backbeat Books. ISBN 978-1-4165-9093-4.
- Whitburn, Joel (2002). Top Adult Contemporary: 1961-2001. Record Research. ISBN 978-0898201499.
