= Duo Caron =

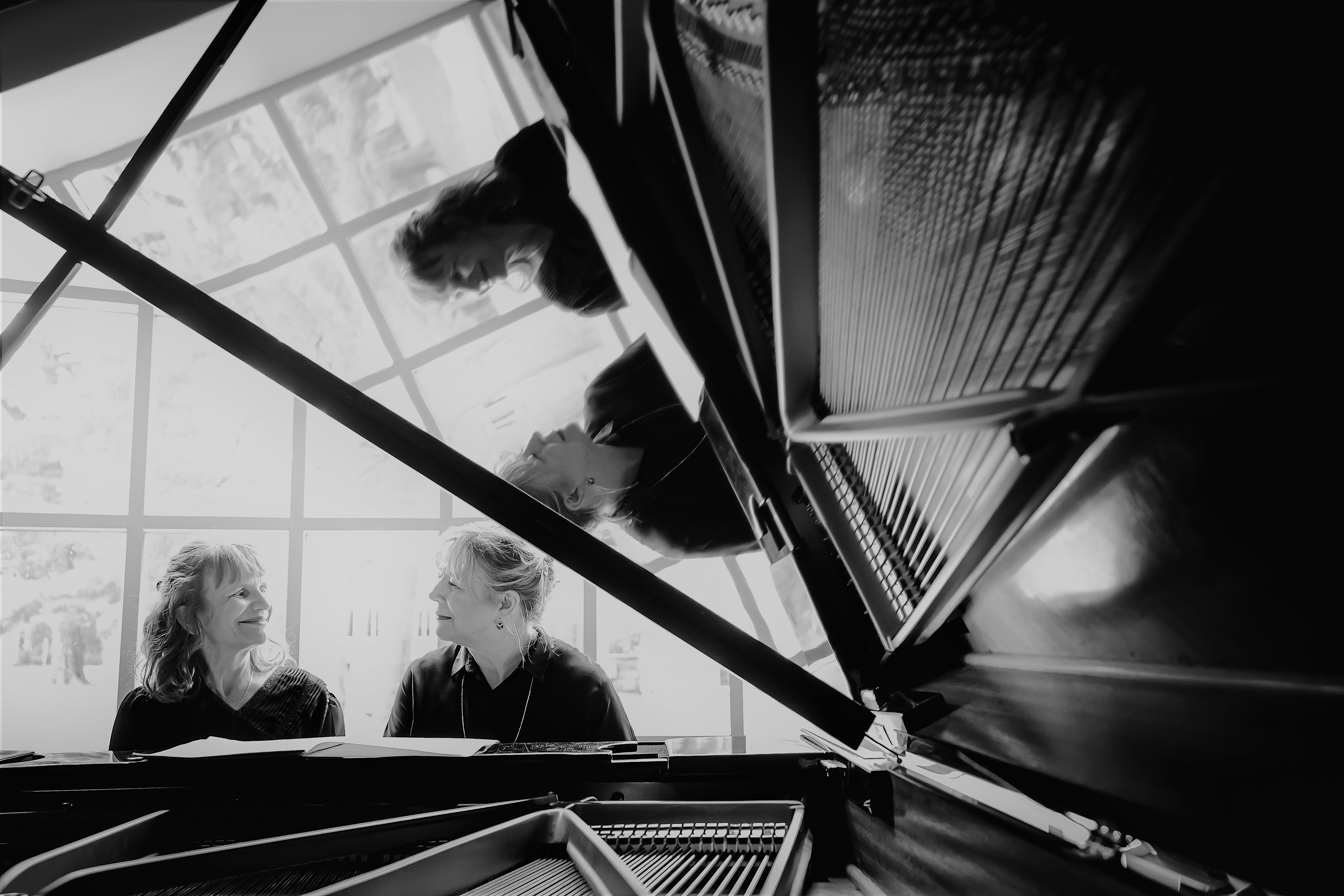
- Josee Caron and Carmen Picard at Bandeen Hall - Bishop's University in 2022

Background information
- Origin: Montreal, Quebec, Canada
- Genres: Classical; Smooth jazz
- Occupations: Pianists, transcriber, arranger, record producer
- Years active: 1990–present
- Labels: SNE; ATMA Classique; SMD
- Members: Josee Caron; Carmen Picard
- Past members: Martin Caron
- Website: Duo Caron

Duo Caron is a classical music group who transcribe and perform orchestral works for various piano formations.

== History ==
Born in Rimouski, Quebec, sibling pianists Josee and Martin Caron began their careers in Montreal. They started collaborating under the name Duo Caron in 1990.

In 1994, because of their transcriptions, the duo received an internship grant from Quebec-Wallonia-Brussels Agency for Youth (AQWBJ) for a promotional tour in Belgium, which was met with rave reviews.

In 2012, after the recording of Mendelssohn, Martin Caron left the group to focus exclusively on composition and teaching.

Since 2020, the duo has consisted of Carmen Picard and Josee Caron. They released an album in 2023, met with positive reviews.

== Premieres ==
Alan Belkin's Petite Suite for two pianos, commissioned by the Duo Caron, was premiered by Duo Caron in Montreal's Claude-Champagne Concert Hall.

In 1998, the Quebec International Duo-Piano Festival commissioned Martin Caron for a George Gershwin transcription for two pianos, eight hands. "Strike up the Band" premiered at the Gala Concert, pour terminer l'événement de façon spectaculaire,

Released in 2009, the recording British Music for Piano Four Hands includes two new arrangements by Martin Caron of Paul McCartney's works, which L'Avantage positively reviewed.

Their recordings have been broadcast on CBC, SRC, "Radio Classique" CJPX, CKUA Radio Network Edmonton, and RTBF Radio "Musiq'3" Belgium.

== Transcriptions by Josee Caron ==
=== For Piano Duet ===
- Gustav Holst (1874-1934): The Planets opus 32, Suite for large Orchestra
  - I. Mars, the Bringer of War
  - IV. Jupiter, the Bringer of Jollity

== Transcriptions by Martin Caron ==
=== For Two Pianos‚ Four Hands ===
- Felix Mendelssohn Bartholdy (1809–1847): Symphony No 4 in A major Italian
- Modest Mussorgsky (1839–1881): Night on Bald Mountain‚ symphonic poem
- Arnold Schoenberg (1874–1951): Verklärte Nacht op. 4 for string sextet ("Transfigured Night")
- Richard Strauss (1864–1949):
  - Don Juan op, 20‚ symphonic poem
  - Till Eulenspiegel's Merry Pranks, symphonic poem
  - Metamorphosen, study for 23 solo strings
- Pyotr Ilyich Tchaikovsky (1840–1893): Symphony No. 4 in F minor‚ op. 36
- Richard Wagner (1813–1883): Overture from the opera Die Meistersinger von Nürnberg

=== For Piano Duet ===
- Sir Edward Elgar (1857–1934): Introduction and Allegro for Strings Op. 47
- Ralph Vaughan Williams (1872–1958): Overture from the opera The Wasps

=== For Four Pianos‚ Sixteen Hands ===
- Sergei Rachmaninoff (1873–1943): Isle of the Dead op. 29‚ symphonic poem
- Pyotr Ilyich Tchaikovsky (1840–1893): Symphony No. 4 in F minor‚ op. 36

=== For Two Pianos‚ Eight Hands ===
- George Gershwin (1898–1937): "Strike up the Band"

== Arrangements by Martin Caron ==
=== For Piano Duet ===
- Paul McCartney (1942- ?):
  - A Leaf for piano solo
  - Appaloosa-Meditation‚ orchestral suite

== Discography ==
- 1992 - Transcriptions for Two Pianos Four Hands (Société Nouvelle d'Enregistrement, SNE-582-CD)
- 1995 - Tchaikovsky for Four Hands (ATMA Classique, ACD 2-2102)
- 2009 - British Music for Piano Four Hands (XXI-21 Productions Inc., XXI-CD 2 1603)
- 2012 - Mendelssohn‚ Transcriptions for 4 hands (Société Métropolitaine du Disque Inc./Espace 21, SMD 225-1)
- 2023 - Modern Four-Hand Suites (Société Métropolitaine du Disque Inc./Espace 21, SMD 312-1)

== Footnotes ==
=== References ===
- Transcriptions - Josée et Martin Caron, pianos from Arnold Schönberg Center
- Transcriptions : pour deux pianos quatre mains = for two pianos four hands. entry in McGill University Library.
- Transcriptions pour deux pianos, quatre mains entry in BAnQ Catalogue Bibliothèque et Archives nationales du Québec.
- Transcriptions : pour deux pianos quatre mains = for two pianos four hands entry in LAC's Library Catalogue Library and Archives Canada.
- Tchaïkovsky 4 mains = Tchaïkovsky 4 hands entry in University of Maryland Libraries.
- Tchaïkovsky 4 mains = Tchaïkovsky 4 hands entry in University of Alberta Library.
- Tchaïkovsky 4 mains= hands entry in WorldCat, Retrieved March 15, 2012.
- Tchaïkovski, 4 mains = 4 hands entry in BAnQ Catalogue Bibliothèque et Archives nationales du Québec.
- Tchaïkovski, 4 mains 4 hands entry in McGill University Library.
- British music for piano four hands entry in University of Maryland Libraries.
- British Music for Piano 4 Hands entry in Apple Music. Retrieved August 11, 2023.
- British music for piano four hands entry in BAnQ Catalogue Bibliothèque et Archives nationales du Québec.
- British music for piano four hands entry in Columbia University Libraries (CLIO).
- British music for piano four hands / McCartney, Vaughan Williams, Walton, Elgar. entry in University of Pennsylvania (PennLibrairies).
- Mendelssohn - Transcriptions pour 4 mains = Transcriptions for 4 hands entry in BAnQ Catalogue Bibliothèque et Archives nationales du Québec.
- Mendelssohn Transcriptions pour 4 mains Transcriptions for 4 hands entry in University of Maryland Libraries.
- Felix Mendelssohn: Transcriptions pour 4 Mains. entry in AllMusic.
- Suites modernes pour quatre mains - Modern Four-Hand Suites entry in University of Maryland Libraries.
- Suites modernes pour quatre mains - Modern Four-Hand Suites entry in BAnQ Catalogue Bibliothèque et Archives nationales du Québec.
- Suites modernes pour quatre mains - Modern Four-Hand Suites entry in LAC's Library Catalogue Library and Archives Canada.
