= Let 'Em In =

- West German picture sleeve

Single by Wings

from the album Wings at the Speed of Sound
- B-side: "Beware My Love"
- Released: 28 June 1976 (US)
- Recorded: 3, 12, 19 & 25 February 1976
- Studio: Abbey Road, London
- Genre: Rock
- Length: 5:10 (album); 3:43 (radio promo edit)
- Label: Capitol; Parlophone
- Songwriters: Paul McCartney; Linda McCartney
- Producer: Paul McCartney

Wings singles chronology
"Silly Love Songs" (1976)	"Let 'Em In" (1976)	"Maybe I'm Amazed" (1977)

Wings at the Speed of Sound track listing
- 11 tracks Side one: 1. "Let 'Em In"; 2. "The Note You Never Wrote"; 3. "She's My Baby"; 4. "Beware My Love"; 5. "Wino Junko"; Side two: 6. "Silly Love Songs"; 7. "Cook of the House"; 8. "Time to Hide"; 9. "Must Do Something About It"; 10. "San Ferry Anne"; 11. "Warm and Beautiful"

"Let 'Em In" is a song by Wings from their 1976 album Wings at the Speed of Sound. It was released as the second single from the album on 28 June 1976 in the United States and on 23 July in the United Kingdom. Paul McCartney originally wrote the song for Ringo Starr before deciding to record it himself. The song was recorded by Wings in February 1976 at Abbey Road Studios in London. A piano ballad, the song features a doorbell, military snare drums, a reggae-influenced trombone solo and a false fade-out. Its lyrics list numerous fictional and real characters who knock on McCartney's front door for a party.

The song was a commercial success, peaking at number 3 in the US, being certified gold, and number 2 in the UK. It was nominated for the Grammy Award for Best Arrangement, Instrumental and Vocals in 1977. Wings performed the song during the Wings Over the World tour in 1976 and later by McCartney in his solo tours after 1990. Artists who have covered the song include Billy Paul and Dr. John.

== Background and recording ==
Paul McCartney originally wrote "Let 'Em In" for his former Beatles bandmate Ringo Starr, although he decided to record it himself; McCartney instead wrote Starr another song, "Pure Gold", which was released on Ringo's Rotogravure in 1976. Wings recorded the backing track for "Let 'Em In" on 3 February 1976 at Abbey Road Studios in London during the recording sessions for their album Wings at the Speed of Sound. Paul produced and Peter Henderson engineered. The lineup was Paul on piano and guide vocals, Jimmy McCulloch on bass and Joe English on drums. After the backing track, the full band – including Linda McCartney and Denny Laine – overdubbed miltary snare drums to create a marching band sound. According to Henderson, they recorded "three kits plus 40 snares", which all five members "tracked a few times, and then we bounced it down". According to the authors Allan Kozinn and Adrian Sinclair, the bass tom-toms on all three kits were detuned to create a "dynamic 'on the street' effect".

On 12 February, Paul recorded his lead vocal, after which he, Linda and Laine added harmony vocals. On 19 February, Paul McCartney recorded the doorbell at his home on 7 Cavendish Avenue in London. The doorbell was purchased by English and McCartney believed it would be "a good introduction to the album". Brass and woodwind players, consisting of Howie Casey, Thaddeus Richard, Steve Howard and Tony Dorsey, recorded their parts on 25 February. Dorsey also performed a reggae-inspired trombone solo. Henderson said Paul wanted the brass arrangement to be "really nasal. So he made me EQ them in a way that they sound really middly, so that's why they sound like they do." The song was mixed between 26 and 29 February.

== Composition ==
"Let 'Em In" is a piano ballad that is in the key of B-flat major. Its song structure is verse–bridge, with an intro, outro and instrumental interludes. The song starts with the sound of a V. & E. Friedland Maestro Westminster Chime doorbell, an electro-mechanical doorbell with a unique "vibrato resonating" feature, before the rhythm begins. Verses 1 and 2 feature lyrics about someone knocking at the door and ringing the bell. In the first bridge, he lists individuals that appear outside the door before requesting they be let inside. According to the music professor Vincent Benitez Jr., verses 1 and 2 and bridge 1 are musically distinguished by modal mixture of alternating F and B♭ chords. Verses 3 to 5 repeat the first, which additional vocal ad-libs. Bridges 2 and 3 repeat the first, with minor textural changes. The trombone solo after bridge 1 is influenced by reggae music, which McCartney grew interested in while in Jamaica. The song features a false fade-out before returning to full volume for the last two notes of the song.

McCartney envisioned the lyrics as describing various fictional and real characters who knock on his front door to enter a party. It is autobiographical and references real people in his life. Those mentioned include McCartney's paternal "Auntie Gin" (real name Jane Harris), his brother Michael, his "Sister Suzy" (Linda), (Note: According to Paul, Linda got the nickname "Suzy" from people in Jamaica, where they holidayed frequently, so Linda formed a group and called themselves "Suzy and the Red Stripes". Wings released the song "Seaside Woman" under this pseudonym in 1977.) his "Brother John" (either Linda's brother John or John Lennon), his uncle Ernie (a character Ringo Starr played in the 1975 film Tommy), (Note: Ernie was actually Paul's cousin Ian, although he felt Ernie was a better play on words. Ian was also not married to "Auntie Gin".) "Phil and Don" (the Everly Brothers) and "Martin Luther" (Martin Luther King Jr.). McCartney said in an interview:

For me, 'Let 'Em In' is a sort of family song. I come from a big rollicking Liverpool Irish family. If you go to one of my family parties, there's just a lot of people ... it's great and it's a fun time. [...] It sort of said: 'let's have a party, why keep em outside?' So in listing the kind of people who might be outside the door, I just naturally went to... Auntie Gin, brother Michael—they all exist. I just wanted a parade of people that we could imagine outside the door, so I drew on all the people I knew.

== Release ==
"Let 'Em In" was first released as the opening track on Wings at the Speed of Sound on 25 March 1976 in the US, and a week later in the UK. On 28 June, (Note: Or 18 June) the song was released in the US by Capitol Records as the second single from the album, with "Beware My Love" as the B-side; its UK release through Parlophone came on 23 July. (Note: US and UK releases: Record labels:) The full-length album version was trimmed to 3:43 for the single. Two promotional singles were compiled, one in stereo and the other in mono, that featured the full-length song and the single edit on the B-side. In France, it was released as a 12" single, McCartney's first-ever, with both sides labelled "Special Disco Mix", although no such mix was created and both featured the LP version.

Like its predecessor "Silly Love Songs", "Let 'Em In" was a commercial success. It spent 16 weeks on the Billboard Hot 100, peaking at number 3, behind "Don't Go Breaking My Heart" by Elton John and Kiki Dee and "You Should Be Dancing" by the Bee Gees, and eventually being certified Gold by the Recording Industry Association of America (RIAA) for sales of over one million copies. It also reached number 1 on the easy listening chart. In the UK, it peaked at number 2, behind "Don't Go Breaking My Heart". It also reached number 2 in Ireland and number 3 in Belgium. In Canada, the song was No. 3 for three weeks on the pop chart and No. 1 for three weeks on the MOR chart of RPM magazine.

In 1977, "Let 'Em In" was nominated for the Grammy Award for Best Arrangement, Instrumental and Vocals, losing the award to "If You Leave Me Now" by Chicago.

=== Live performances ===
Wings performed "Let 'Em In" live throughout the Wings Over the World tour. A live recording from the tour, dated 23 June 1976 at the Los Angeles Forum, was released on the live album Wings over America the same year. McCartney has continued performing the song solo since The Paul McCartney World Tour in 1990. A recording from this tour, made in Tokyo on 5 March 1990, appeared on the "Birthday" CD single the same year, while another from the 2002–2003 Back in the World tour, made in Osaka on 17 November 2002, appeared on the live album Back in the World in 2003.

=== Later releases ===
It was included on the compilation album Wings Greatest (1978), as well as the Paul McCartney compilation albums All the Best! (1987), Wingspan: Hits and History (2001), Pure McCartney (2016) and Wings (2025). It was also featured on The 7" Singles Box in 2022. McCartney's original demo of the song, featuring Laine on lead vocals, was included in the Paul McCartney Archive Collection reissue of Wings at the Speed of Sound in 2014.

== Reception ==
Upon its release as a single, some critics felt "Let 'Em In" was superior to "Silly Love Songs". Cash Box said that "McCartney's voice is at its best, and the rhythm of this one is dangerously addictive." Record World said that "with a loping beat and a brisk military drum sound, this should be another chapter in McCartney's success story." More negatively, Sounds magazine said the song "has the pace of a sloth with a hangnail. Leave me out Paulie."

Retrospectively, AllMusic's Stephen Thomas Erlewine described "Let 'Em In" and "Silly Love Songs" as "so lightweight that their lack of substance seems nearly defiant". John Bergstrom of PopMatters said the song "is strangely martial but goes down easy no less, a good example of how McCartney could still at times imbue whimsical material with artistic substance."

== Personnel ==
According to Luca Perasi:

- Paul McCartney – lead and backing vocals, piano, snare
- Linda McCartney – backing vocals, snare
- Denny Laine – backing vocals, snare
- Jimmy McCulloch – bass, snare
- Joe English – drums, snare
- Howie Casey – saxophone
- Thaddeus Richard – flute, flugelhorn
- Steve Howard – flugelhorn
- Tony Dorsey – flute, trombone

Technical

- Paul McCartney – producer
- Peter Henderson – engineer

== Charts ==
=== Weekly charts ===
Chart (1976)	Peak position
Australia	65
Canada RPM Top Singles	3
Canada Adult Contemporary (RPM)	1
Ireland (IRMA)	2
Netherlands (Single Top 100)	25
New Zealand (Recorded Music NZ)	13
UK Singles (Official Charts)	2
US Billboard Hot 100	3
US Adult Contemporary (Billboard)	1
US Cash Box Top 100	1
West Germany (GfK)	29

=== Year-end charts ===
Chart (1976)	Rank
Canada RPM Top Singles	46
UK	29
US Billboard Hot 100	66

== Certifications ==
Region	Certification	Certified units/sales
United States (RIAA)	Gold	1,000,000^{^}
^{^} Shipments figures based on certification alone.

== Cover versions ==
- The song was covered in 1977 by the soul singer Billy Paul, substituting a list of notable African-American figures such as Malcolm X and Louis Armstrong in place of the people named in the original. Some American radio stations found the rendition too political and refused to play it. This version reached No. 91 on the Billboard Soul chart, and No. 26 on the UK charts.
- Reggae artist Shinehead included the song "Let Them In" on his 1992 album Sidewalk University. The song was released as the single "Let 'Em In" in 1993, reaching number 70 in the UK, 153 in Australia, and 13 in New Zealand.
- Ringo Starr used lyrics from "Let 'Em In" in 2003 on "English Garden" from Ringo Rama.
- Dr. John covered the song for the 2014 tribute album The Art of McCartney.

== See also ==
- List of number-one adult contemporary singles of 1976 (U.S.)
