= Rimouski =

City in Quebec, Canada

- City
- City of Rimouski; Ville de Rimouski
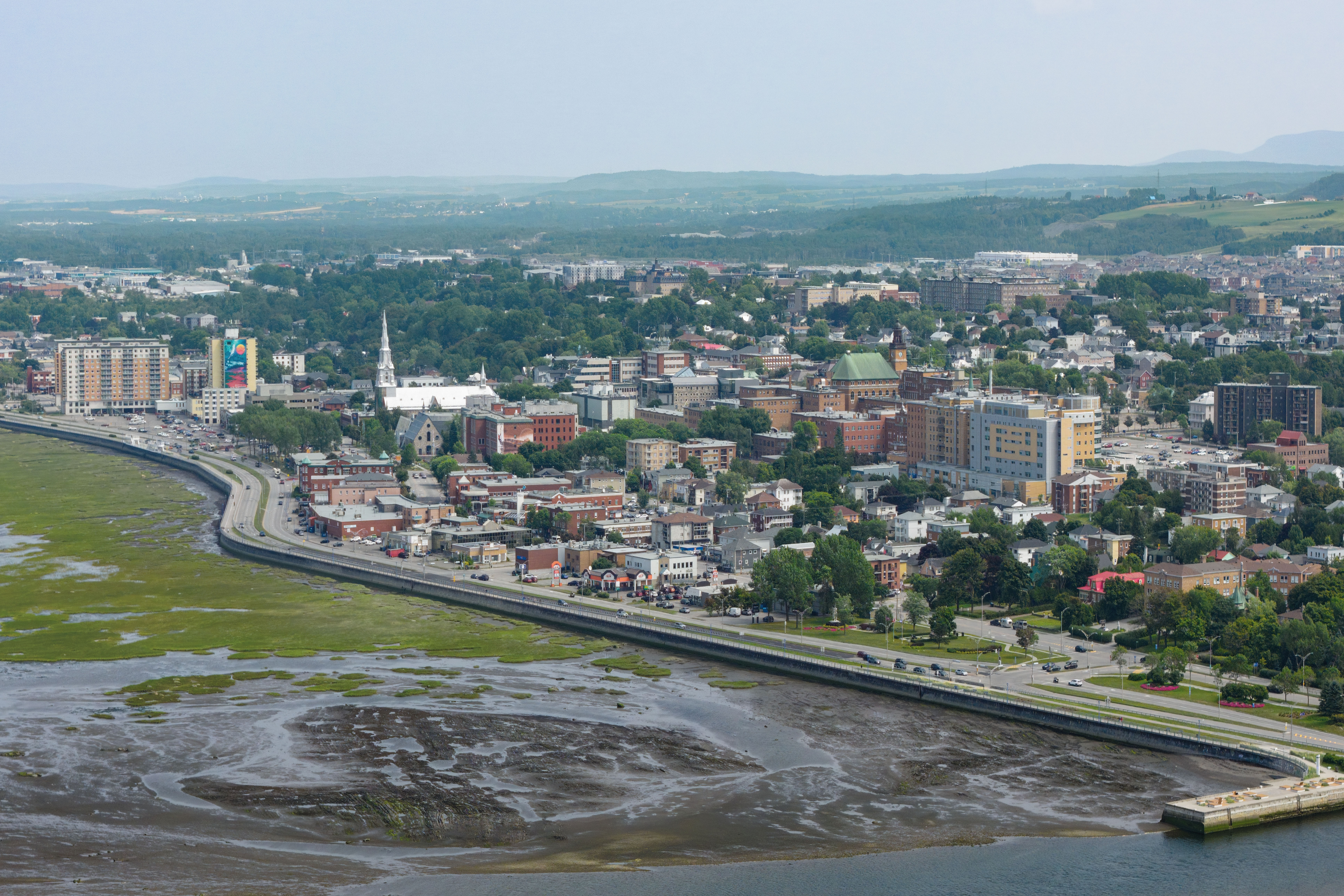
- Skyline of Rimouski from St. Lawrence River

- Flag Coat of arms Logo
- Motto: Legi patrum fidelis (Fidèles à la loi de nos pères)
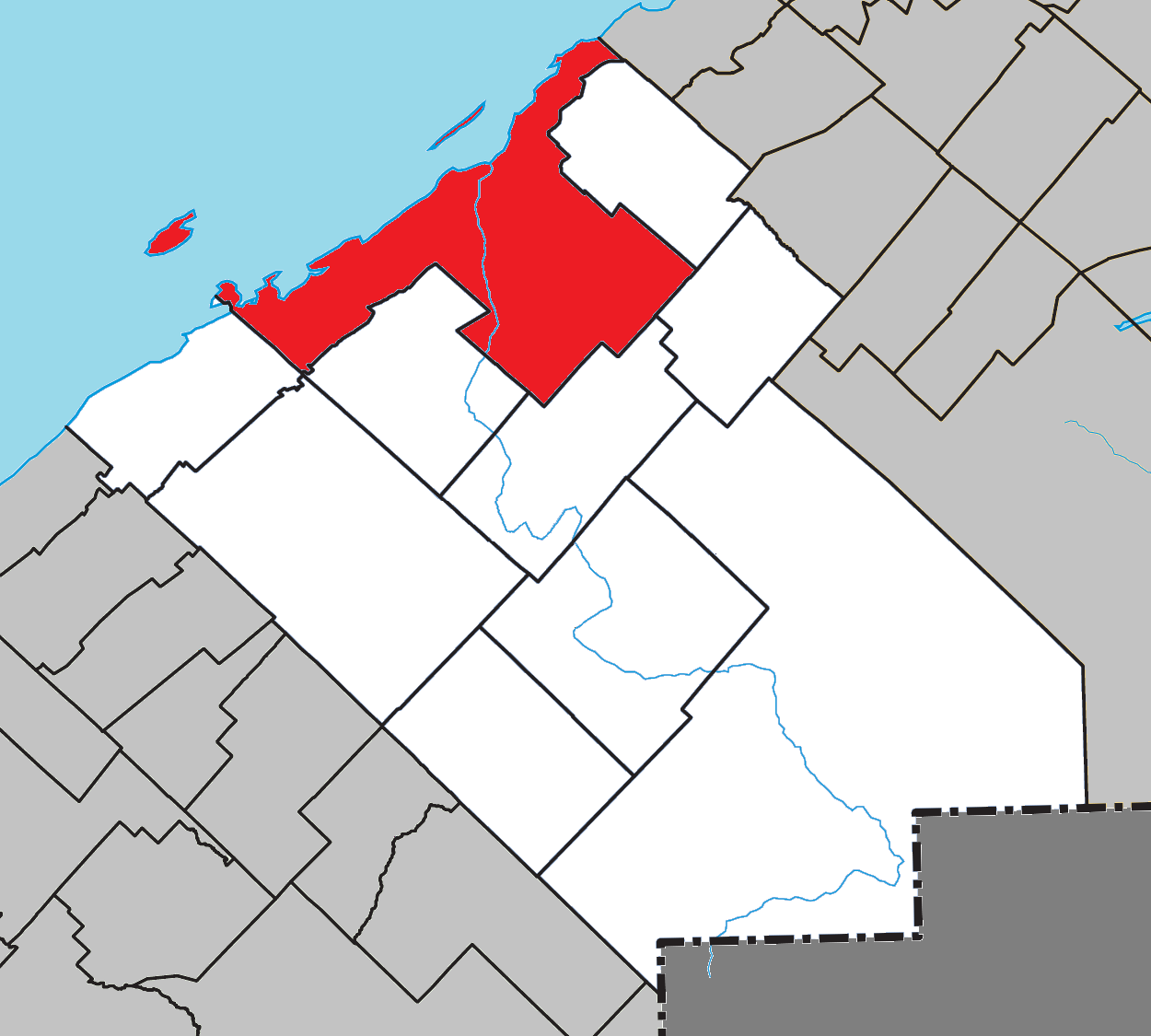
- Location within Rimouski-Neigette RCM

- Location in Quebec
- Coordinates: 48°27′N 68°32′W
- Country: Canada
- Province: Quebec
- Region: Bas-Saint-Laurent
- RCM: Rimouski-Neigette
- Constituted: January 1, 2002

Government
  - Mayor: Guy Caron
  - Federal riding: Rimouski-Neigette—Mitis—Matapédia—Les Basques
  - Prov. riding: Rimouski

Area
  - City: 529.50 km^{2} (204.44 sq mi)
  - Land: 339.13 km^{2} (130.94 sq mi)
  - Urban: 28.52 km^{2} (11.01 sq mi)
  - Metro: 772.93 km^{2} (298.43 sq mi)

Population (2021)
  - City: 48,935
  - Density: 144.3/km^{2} (374/sq mi)
  - Urban: 39,840 (75th)
  - Urban density: 1,396.9/km^{2} (3,618/sq mi)
  - Metro: 53,944 (60th)
  - Metro density: 69.8/km^{2} (181/sq mi)
  - Change 2016-2021: ▲0.8%
  - Dwellings: 24,262
- Demonym(s): Rimouskois, Rimouskoise
- Time zone: UTC−5 (EST)
  - Summer (DST): UTC−4 (EDT)
- Postal code(s): G5L to G5N
- Area codes: 418 and 581
- Highways A-20: R-132; R-232
- Geocode: 24 10043
- Website: www.ville.rimouski.qc.ca

Rimouski (/ˌrɪmˈuːski/ /ˌrɪmuːˈski/ rim-OO-skee RIM-oo-SKEE; French: [ʁimuski]) is a city in Quebec, Canada. Rimouski is located in the Bas-Saint-Laurent region, at the mouth of the Rimouski River. As of 2021, the city has a population of 48,935. Rimouski, whose motto is Legi patrum fidelis (Faithful to the law of our fathers), is located on the south shore of the Saint Lawrence Estuary, around 300 km downstream of Quebec City. It is the site of Université du Québec à Rimouski (UQAR), the Cégep de Rimouski (which includes the Institut maritime du Québec) and the Music Conservatory. It is also the home of some ocean sciences research centres (see below).

== History ==
The name Rimouski has been described as likely derived from a Mi'kmaq word meaning "land of the moose". However, the Commission de toponymie du Québec notes that more recent research instead favors a link to the Wolastoqey, likely meaning "Land of Dogs" or "Land of Poplar Blossoms". The city was founded by Sir René Lepage de Ste-Claire in 1696. Originally from Ouanne in the Burgundy region, he exchanged property he owned on the Île d'Orléans with Augustin Rouer de la Cardonnière for the Seigneurie of Rimouski, which extended along the St. Lawrence River from the Hâtée River at Le Bic to the Métis River. De la Cardonnière had been the owner of Rimouski since 1688, but had never lived there. René Lepage moved his family to Rimouski, where it held the seigneurie until 1790, when it was sold to the Quebec City businessman Joseph Drapeau.

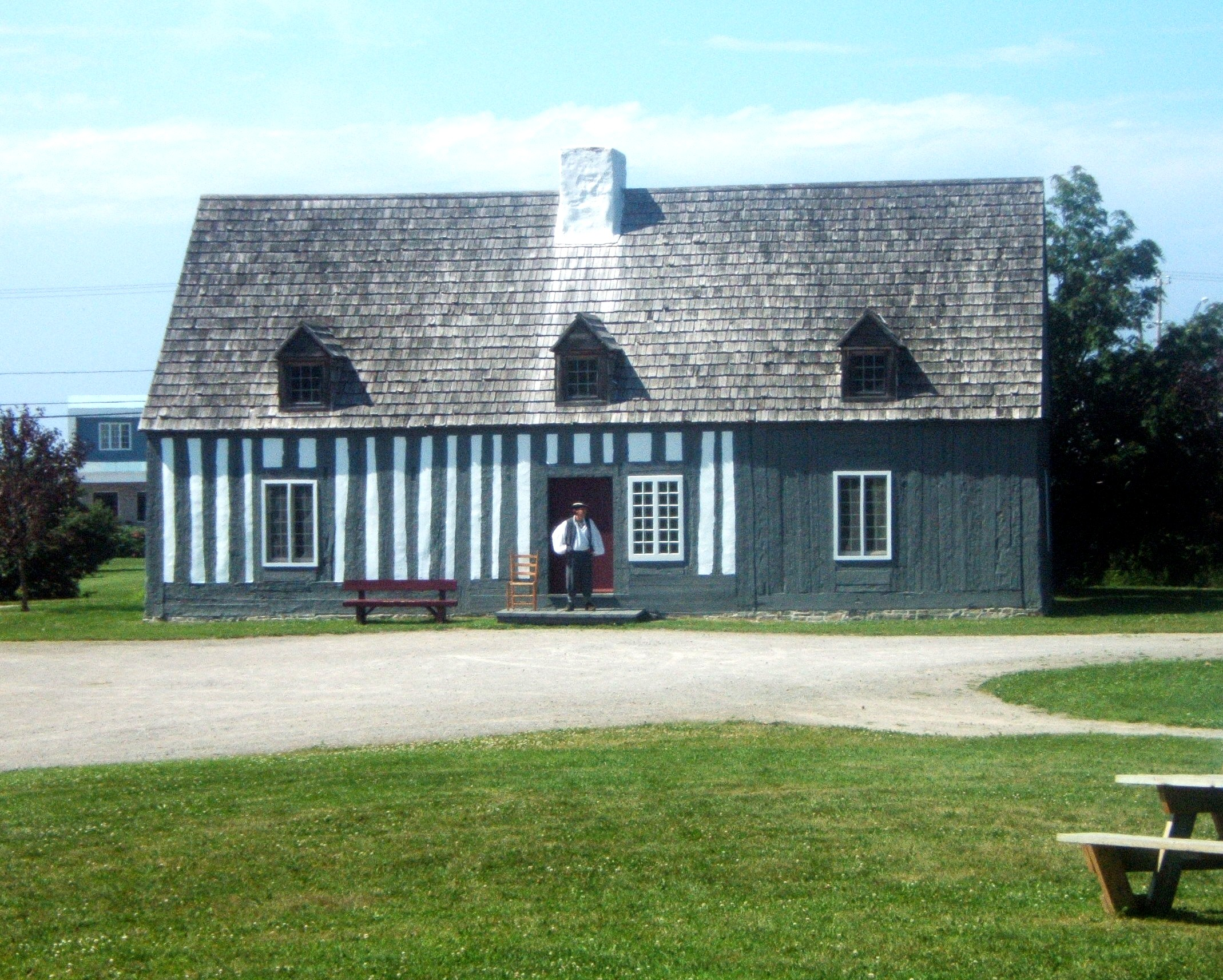
"Maison Lamontagne"

The "Maison Lamontagne" was built in 1750 per Marie-Agnès Lepage, granddaughter of René Lepage de Ste-Claire. It carries now the surname of the family that resided at it in 1844. It is one of the oldest half-timbered houses in Quebec and is within what is now called the District of Rimouski-Est.

Today, a boulevard, park and monument at the western entrance of Rimouski bear the name of René Lepage.

=== The "Red Night" ===
On May 6, 1950, Rimouski suffered a severe fire, in which 319 houses burned to the ground. This event is known as La nuit rouge (French for Red Night). The fire originated in the Price Brothers and Company yard on the left shore of the Rimouski River and quickly crossed the river and spread throughout the city pushed by strong winds, destroying half of the city. No one died in the blaze. Legend has it that a priest sprinkled holy water around the city's cathedral and that the fire would not cross the line.

== Geography ==
=== Climate ===
Rimouski has a humid continental climate (Köppen Dfb) with cold, snowy winters and warm, rainy summers.

Climate data for Rimouski (1981−2010)
Month	Jan	Feb	Mar	Apr	May	Jun	Jul	Aug	Sep	Oct	Nov	Dec	Year
Record high °C (°F)	14.5 (58.1)	12.5 (54.5)	24.0 (75.2)	29.0 (84.2)	32.8 (91.0)	35.0 (95.0)	36.0 (96.8)	35.5 (95.9)	33.0 (91.4)	26.5 (79.7)	21.5 (70.7)	15.0 (59.0)	36.0 (96.8)
Mean maximum °C (°F)	5.3 (41.5)	3.9 (39.0)	7.9 (46.2)	15.8 (60.4)	23.3 (73.9)	26.7 (80.1)	28.0 (82.4)	27.3 (81.1)	24.5 (76.1)	19.7 (67.5)	14.2 (57.6)	7.7 (45.9)	29.7 (85.5)
Mean daily maximum °C (°F)	−7.1 (19.2)	−5.7 (21.7)	0.1 (32.2)	7.3 (45.1)	15.1 (59.2)	20.8 (69.4)	23.5 (74.3)	22.5 (72.5)	17.7 (63.9)	10.3 (50.5)	3.7 (38.7)	−2.9 (26.8)	8.8 (47.8)
Daily mean °C (°F)	−11.0 (12.2)	−9.6 (14.7)	−3.9 (25.0)	3.2 (37.8)	10.2 (50.4)	15.7 (60.3)	18.6 (65.5)	17.8 (64.0)	13.4 (56.1)	7.0 (44.6)	0.9 (33.6)	−5.8 (21.6)	4.7 (40.5)
Mean daily minimum °C (°F)	−14.6 (5.7)	−13.6 (7.5)	−7.8 (18.0)	−0.9 (30.4)	5.2 (41.4)	10.7 (51.3)	13.7 (56.7)	13.1 (55.6)	9.1 (48.4)	3.6 (38.5)	−1.8 (28.8)	−9 (16)	0.6 (33.1)
Mean minimum °C (°F)	−24.6 (−12.3)	−23.7 (−10.7)	−18.8 (−1.8)	−8.8 (16.2)	−1.1 (30.0)	3.5 (38.3)	7.6 (45.7)	6.6 (43.9)	1.4 (34.5)	−3.0 (26.6)	−10.1 (13.8)	−18.7 (−1.7)	−26.0 (−14.8)
Record low °C (°F)	−33 (−27)	−32 (−26)	−25.5 (−13.9)	−22 (−8)	−7.2 (19.0)	0.0 (32.0)	3.0 (37.4)	0.0 (32.0)	−1.1 (30.0)	−7.8 (18.0)	−16.5 (2.3)	−30.6 (−23.1)	−33 (−27)
Average precipitation mm (inches)	71.0 (2.80)	65.8 (2.59)	64.0 (2.52)	73.2 (2.88)	81.8 (3.22)	81.2 (3.20)	93.9 (3.70)	80.2 (3.16)	91.0 (3.58)	96.3 (3.79)	77.5 (3.05)	89.5 (3.52)	965.4 (38.01)
Average rainfall mm (inches)	11.1 (0.44)	5.6 (0.22)	14.0 (0.55)	54.0 (2.13)	80.4 (3.17)	81.2 (3.20)	93.9 (3.70)	80.2 (3.16)	91.0 (3.58)	94.3 (3.71)	56.8 (2.24)	24.6 (0.97)	687.0 (27.05)
Average snowfall cm (inches)	61.3 (24.1)	58.7 (23.1)	50.9 (20.0)	17.2 (6.8)	1.4 (0.6)	0.0 (0.0)	0.0 (0.0)	0.0 (0.0)	0.0 (0.0)	2.0 (0.8)	21.3 (8.4)	66.4 (26.1)	279.2 (109.9)
Average precipitation days (≥ 0.2 mm)	14.1	11.8	11.6	12.3	13.9	14.1	15.4	13.0	13.8	14.8	12.7	13.9	161.0
Average rainy days (≥ 0.2 mm)	1.6	1.2	3.1	9.9	13.7	14.1	15.4	13.0	13.8	14.7	8.6	3.1	112.0
Average snowy days (≥ 0.2 cm)	13.0	10.8	9.0	3.5	0.36	0.0	0.0	0.0	0.0	0.40	5.3	12.2	54.6
Average dew point °C (°F)	−13.5 (7.7)	−12.7 (9.1)	−8.4 (16.9)	−2.5 (27.5)	3.8 (38.8)	9.0 (48.2)	12.5 (54.5)	12.0 (53.6)	8.5 (47.3)	2.8 (37.0)	−2.9 (26.8)	−8.8 (16.2)	0.0 (32.0)
Mean monthly sunshine hours	52.8	89.3	134.3	155.4	192.2	217.2	231.5	221.1	157.7	95.8	55.3	51.9	1,654.5
Percentage possible sunshine	19.4	31.3	36.5	38.0	40.8	45.1	47.7	49.8	41.6	28.5	19.9	19.9	34.9
Source 1: Environment Canada
Source 2: weatherstats.ca (for dewpoint and monthly&yearly average absolute maximum&minimum temperature)

== Demographics ==
Historical populations
Year	Pop.	±%
1871	1,186	—
1881	1,417	+19.5%
1891	1,429	+0.8%
1901	1,804	+26.2%
1911	3,097	+71.7%
1921	3,612	+16.6%
1931	5,589	+54.7%
1941	7,009	+25.4%
1951	11,565	+65.0%
1956	14,630	+26.5%
1961	17,739	+21.3%
1966	20,330	+14.6%
1971	26,934	+32.5%
1976	27,897	+3.6%
1981	29,120	+4.4%
1986	29,672	+1.9%
1991	30,873	+4.0%
1996	31,773	+2.9%
2001	31,305	−1.5%
2006	42,240	+34.9%
2011	46,860	+10.9%
2016	48,664	+3.8%
2021	48,935	+0.6%
Source: Statistics Canada

In the 2021 Census of Population conducted by Statistics Canada, Rimouski had a population of 48,935 living in 23,470 of its 24,849 total private dwellings, a change of 0.6% from its 2016 population of 48,664. With a land area of 339.13 km^{2} (130.94 sq mi), it had a population density of 144.3/km^{2} (373.7/sq mi) in 2021.

Canada census – Rimouski community profile

	2021	2016	2011
Population	48,935 (+0.6% from 2016)	48,664 (+3.8% from 2011)	46,860 (+3.7% from 2006)
Land area	339.13 km^{2} (130.94 sq mi)	339.64 km^{2} (131.14 sq mi)	339.84 km^{2} (131.21 sq mi)
Population density	144.3/km^{2} (374/sq mi)	143.3/km^{2} (371/sq mi)	137.9/km^{2} (357/sq mi)
Median age	47.2 (M: 45.2, F: 49.2)	47.5 (M: 44.7, F: 49.9)	46.4 (M: 44.2, F: 48.2)
Private dwellings	24,849 (total) 23,470 (occupied)	24,262 (total)	22,703 (total)
Median household income	$66,000	$56,728	$57,841

References: 2021 2016 2011

The 2021 census found that French was the mother tongue of 97.2% of the population. The next most common mother tongues were English (0.8%), Spanish (0.3%), Arabic (0.2%), and Swahili (0.1%).

Home Language (2021)
Language	Population	Percentage (%)
English	230	1%
French	47,910	98%
Other	295	1%

== Economy ==
=== Maritime sector ===
One of Rimouski's primary economic fields is its maritime sector. Around 1900, the port was important for operating mail tenders such as HMCS Lady Evelyn for transatlantic liners. These could take mail from an arriving ship in the mouth of the St Lawrence, then speed it by rail to Quebec, arriving long before the ship. The town welcomes students at the Institut Maritime du Québec, which offers exclusively marine-related programs of studies. Rimouski is also the home of many marine research centres, such as the Institut des sciences de la mer (ISMER), the Centre de recherche sur les biotechnologies marines and the Centre interdisciplinaire de développement en cartographie des océans.

Rimouski is also home to the headquarters of the St. Lawrence Global Observatory,^{[2]} an inter-institutional group seeking to provide, through its Internet portal, an integrated and rapid access to data and information concerning the global ecosystem of the St. Lawrence, in order to promote sustainable management.

A ferry used to cross over from Forestville twice daily from May to September, but it is not currently running.

The port operates five berths ranging from 130 to 213 metres in length, with a water depth of 7.3 metres, and is mainly used for the transshipment of salt.

The tide station located at Pointe-au-Père serves as the reference point for measuring mean sea level for the North American Vertical Datum of 1988, which is the reference point for determining altitude in North America.

== Arts and culture ==
Rimouski has an active cultural life, being host of festivals like Festi Jazz International since 1982, the Grandes Fêtes du Saint-Laurent, a familial musical event taking place the first week-end of July and an international film festival, the Carrousel international du film de Rimouski.

In November, the town is the host of the yearly Salon du Livre de Rimouski, the oldest event of its kind in the province of Quebec. It was created in 1964 by a group of women with a passion for literature, who wished to make literature more accessible to young readers. Every year, more than 125 authors from the region and its surroundings participate in the event, and over 300 Quebec Publishers distribute about 75 stands among themselves. Supported by Canada Heritage, the Canada Council of the Arts, the Society of development of the cultural companies of Quebec and the city of Rimouski, the event attracts more than 8000 visitors per year.

The Music Conservatory of Quebec at Rimouski, founded in 1973, is one of musical institutions that form the network of the Conservatoire of Music and Drama in Quebec.

Several renowned musicians, among others André Laplante, Marcelle Deschênes, Stéphane Lemelin, Gaston Brisson, David Jalbert, Josée and Martin Caron, Gilles Rioux and Joseph Rouleau, were born in the city or in the surrounding area.

== Attractions ==
One of the town's main tourist attractions is the Site historique maritime de la Pointe-au-Père, which features an exhibit on the RMS Empress of Ireland disaster and the Pointe-au-Père lighthouse. The museum's exhibit on the RMS Empress of Ireland disaster commemorates the loss of 1,012 persons in the most fatal peacetime shipwreck in the 20th century, after the infamous Titanic tragedy.

== Sports ==
The town is also enthusiastic about sporting events. The town hosted the Jeux du Québec in 2001 and was the host of the Memorial Cup Tournament in 2009, and again in 2025.

Since 1995, the town has been home to a QMJHL team, the Rimouski Océanic. Former Océanic players include Sidney Crosby, Vincent Lecavalier, Michel Ouellet, Brad Richards and Alexis Lafrenière.

== Government ==
The city is divided into 11 districts. Six of those districts (Pointe-au-Père, Sainte-Blandine, Rimouski-Est, Sainte-Odile-sur-Rimouski and Le Bic) were small communities but were merged within Rimouski in 2002, except for Le Bic, which was merged in 2009. The municipal council is composed of the mayor and eleven councillors, each one representing a district.

mandate	fonctions	name(s)
2025–2029	Mayor	Guy Caron
2025–2029	Districts
2025–2029	#1 Sacré-Coeur	Francis Chouinard
2025–2029	#2 Nazareth	Patrick Dumont
2025–2029	#3 Saint-Germain	Élise Gagnon
2025–2029	#4 Rimouski-Est	Cécilia Michaud
2025–2029	#5 Pointe-au-Père	Julie Carré
2025–2029	#6 Sainte-Odile	Grégory Thorez
2025–2029	#7 Saint-Robert	Jocelyn Pelletier
2025–2029	#8 Terrasse Arthur-Buies	Antoine Durette-Landry
2025–2029	#9 Saint-Pie X	Mélanie Bernier
2025–2029	#10 Sainte-Blandine/Mont-Lebel	Dave Dumas
2025–2029	#11 Le Bic	Alain Martineau

Source: Ville de Rimouski

== Infrastructure ==
=== Transportation ===
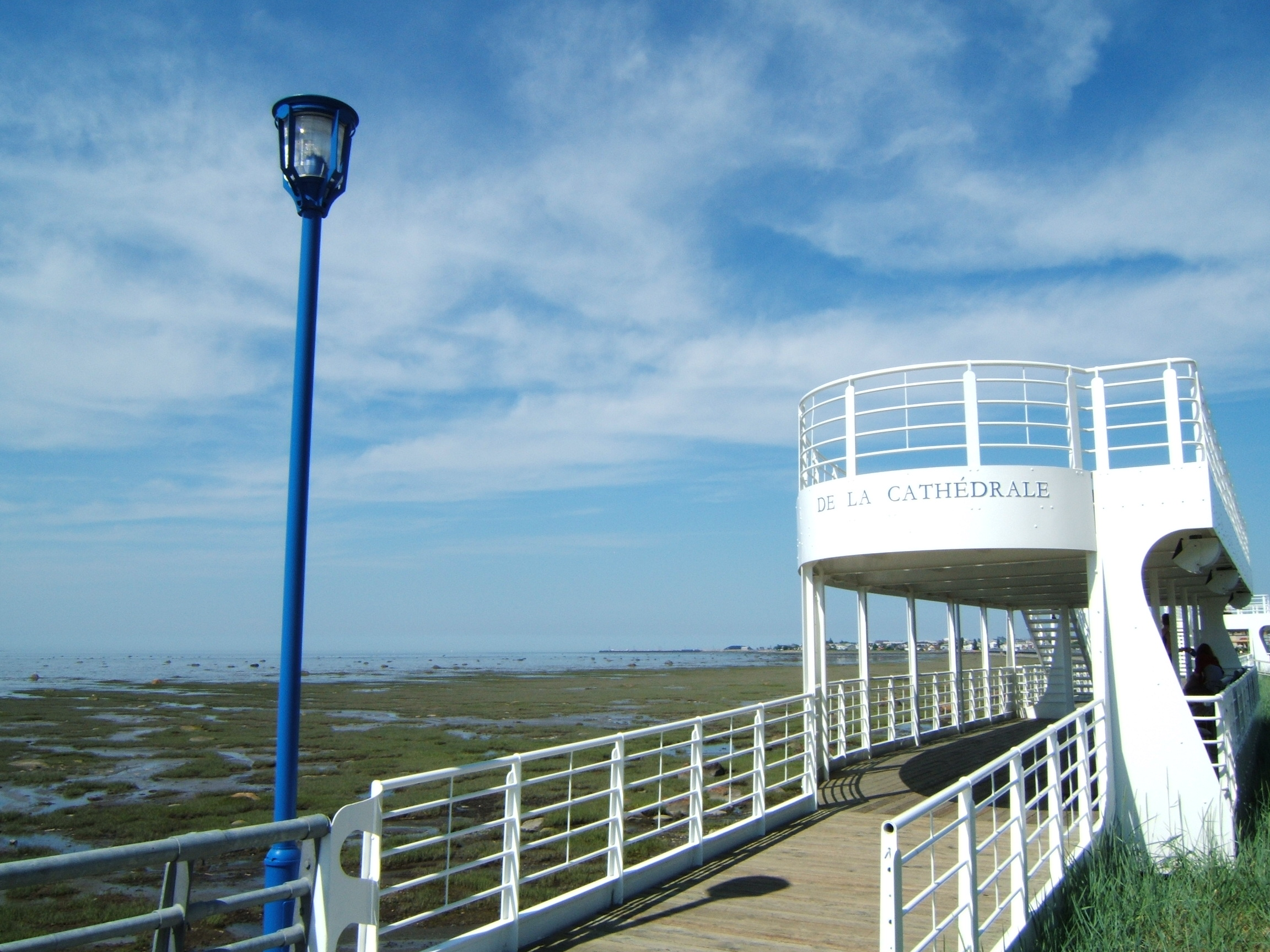
The Walk of the Sea at Rimouski.

The city is served by the municipal Rimouski Airport (IATA airport code YXK), which caters to general aviation and cargo aircraft, and by the regional Mont-Joli Airport (YYY), 35 km to the east of Rimouski, which caters to commercial passenger aircraft. There are daily passenger flights to destinations in Quebec (Quebec City, Montreal, and others) and Newfoundland and Labrador.

Between April and October, the CNM Evolution, a ferry service, operates across the Saint Lawrence River between Rimouski and Forestville, Quebec. This ferry is the fastest in the province of Quebec, crossing the river in only 55 minutes.

One end of the Nordik-Express line is in Rimouski; other stops (on the North Shore) of this weekly 1150 km-long line are in Sept-Îles, Port-Menier, Havre-Saint-Pierre, Natashquan, Kegaska, La Romaine, Harrington Harbour, Tête-à-la-Baleine, La Tabatière, Pointe-à-la-truite, Blanc Sablon and St. Barbe. All stops are in the Quebec, except St. Barbe, which is in Newfoundland and Labrador.

The Canadian National south shore railway passes through town, and there is a VIA Rail service three times weekly in each direction, which heads westbound toward Quebec City (Sainte-Foy) and Montreal and eastbound toward Moncton and Halifax.

The Orleans Express bus service also serves Rimouski; Rimouski station is on the main thoroughfare from Quebec City to the maritime provinces.

=== Health ===
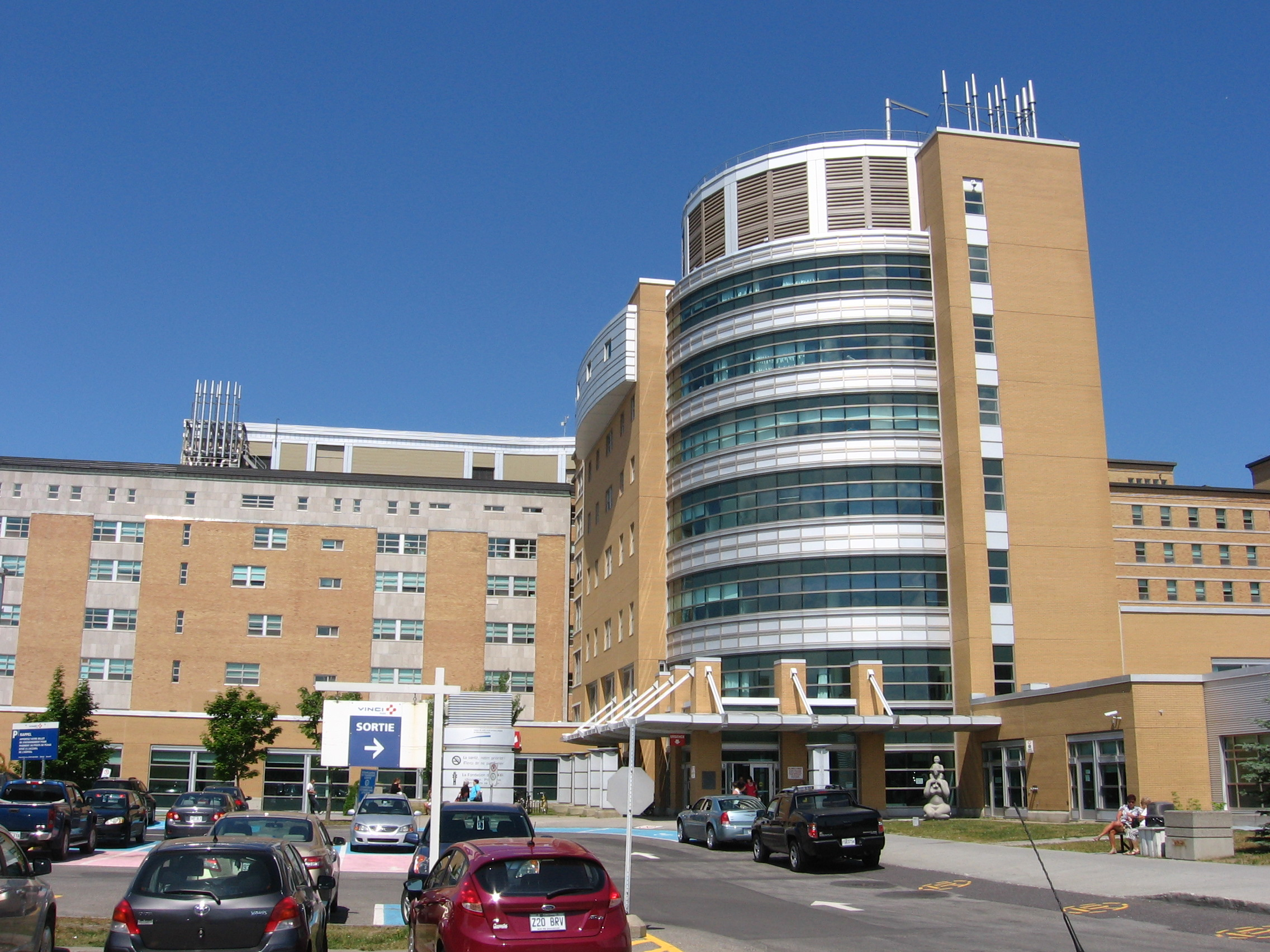
Regional Hospital of Rimouski

The largest employer in Rimouski and the region is the Regional Hospital of Rimouski with 2200 employees and 170 doctors. It handles a budget of more than 150 million dollars. Since 2004 the hospital is known as CSSS Rimouski-Neigette. The hospital serves the large majority of patients in the region as far as Gaspé. Several medical specialties are present at the hospital such as cardiology, endocrinology, fertility, gastroenterology, hematology, obstetric-gynecology, neurology, oncology, otorhinolaryngology, orthopedic, pediatric, rheumatology, surgery, and urology. The hospital also has several departments such as emergency, intensive care, and pharmacy. Several medical clinics surround the hospital located on Rouleau Avenue. The CLSC however is located in front of the obstetrics and gynecology clinic on du Gouverneur Street.

== Sister cities ==
Rimouski is twinned with:

- Westmount, Quebec, Canada (since 1968)

== Notable people ==
- Philomène Belliveau (1854–1940), artist, lived and died in Rimouski.
- Maude Charron, weightlifter, won the gold medal in 64 kg division at the 2020 Summer Olympics in Tokyo.
- Bernard Voyer, explorer, mountaineer.
- Patrick Côté, former UFC fighter and MMA competitor.
- Pierre-Luc Dubois, NHL player, grew up in Rimouski.
- Sandy Burgess, Québécois radio personality.
- Lawrence Lepage, singer-songwriter, born in Nazareth (modern-day Rimouski)

== See also ==
- Rimouski Seignory
- Rimouski River
- List of cities in Quebec
- Municipal reorganization in Quebec
- Maison Joseph-Gauvreau
- Pointe-au-Père National Wildlife Area
