= René Lepage de Sainte-Claire =

Coat of arms of René Lepage: «Argent an eagle sable, armed, beaked, langued and spurred Gules»

Rene Lepage de Sainte-Claire (April 10, 1656, in Ouanne, Burgundy – August 4, 1718, in Rimouski, Quebec) is the lord-founder of the town of Rimouski, Quebec, Canada.

== Origin ==
Born close to Auxerre in the Province of Burgundy, René Lepage immigrated to New France, with his mother Reine Loury and his aunt Constance Lepage, between 1670 and 1674. There, he joined his father Germain and his uncle Louis, who were installed on grounds of the current parish of St-François, at the north-eastern point of the Île d'Orleans, close to Quebec City. On June 10, 1686, René Lepage married Marie-Madeleine Gagnon, 15 years old, with whom he had 17 children.

== Acquisition of Rimouski ==
Like several of his fellow-citizens, René dreamt to build a great stronghold for his family. With this intention, he left the Île d'Orléans to go live on the coast. On March 17, 1693, the Governor of New France, Louis de Buade, Count of Frontenac, conceded to him a ground in commoner's condition located behind stronghold of Espinay at the South river, which they called Sainte-Claire. From this moment he added this part to his name, as was the fashion of the time, even without ennoblement.

Too far away from the Saint Lawrence River, he gave up his project of colonization the following year. Indeed, July 10, 1694, René Lepage de Ste-Claire exchanged his ground in the Île d'Orléans (bequeathed by his father Germain) with Augustin Rouer de la Cardonnière, son of a merchant of Quebec City, for the Seigneurie of Rimouski. Rouer de la Cardonnière, owner of the concession since 1688 did not intend obviously to leave the area of Quebec City to go to settle so far.

== Expansion of the Seigneurie ==
Two years later, René moved his family in Rimouski. His wife, Marie-Madeleine Gagnon, 15 years his junior, followed him with their first 4 children: Pierre de St-Barnabé, born in 1687 and who will succeed to him; Marie, born in 1689; Louis de Ste-Claire, born in 1690, who will be ordered priest and will become the future Lord of Terrebonne; and finally Guillaume, the youngest, who will die in low age in 1701, towards the 10 years age.

In 1696, they are the first inhabitants of this seigniory, with some other parents. In order to leave in heritage advantageous grounds with his children, René thus acquires, with other nearest relatives, Pierre Lessard and Gabriel Thibierge inter alia, other pieces of seigniories, extending from Grand-Métis, l'Anse-aux-Coques, Father's Point, St-Barnabé to the Hâtée river. All these transactions are supplemented about 1701. One thus realizes that Lepage de Ste-Claire did not want to waste time to establish his family durably. He is, at this date, the Lord of a territory of more than 50 km of sea front on the littoral of St-Lawrence river.

== Heritage ==
Of René Lepage's progeny, four girls became nuns, his eldest son, Pierre de St-Barnabé, took the seigniory and cleared it with the profit of his family, and his second boy, Louis Lepage de Ste-Claire, priest and canon, was born in St-François from the Ile d'Orleans. He acquired the seigniory of Terrebonne on September 2, 1720. He quickly developed the land surrounding Mille-île river; he had a church built with a presbytery, four flour mills and a lumber mill, which created of an important industrial centre in New France, after Quebec City and Montreal.

The descendants of René Lepage have settled across North America, from Canada to the south-west of the United States over the years.

== Bibliography ==
- Jean-Charles Fortin, Antonio Lechasseur et al., Histoire du Bas-St-Laurent, Quebec, Institut québécois de recherche sur la culture IQRC, 1993.
- Reynald Lepage et al., Dictionnaire généalogique des Familles LEPAGE, Tome 1 and 2, Second Edition, Québec, Association des Lepage d'Amérique Inc., 2004.
- Jeannot Bourdages, Paul Larocque et al., Rimouski depuis ses origines, Rimouski, Société d'histoire du Bas-St-Laurent, Société de généalogie et d'archives de Rimouski, Université du Québec à Rimouski (GRIDEQ), 2006.
