= Wings at the Speed of Sound =

Studio album by Wings
- Released: 25 March 1976
- Recorded: August–October 1975: January–February 1976
- Studios: Abbey Road, London
- Genre: Soft rock
- Length: 46:36
- Label: Capitol
- Producer: Paul McCartney

Wings chronology
Venus and Mars (1975)	Wings at the Speed of Sound (1976)	Wings over America (1976)

Singles from Wings at the Speed of Sound
- 1. "Silly Love Songs" Released: 1 April 1976; 2. "Let 'Em In" Released: 28 June 1976

Wings at the Speed of Sound (Note: Titled At the Speed of Sound by Paul McCartney's website and the 2025 book Wings: The Story of a Band on the Run.) is the fifth studio album by the British–American rock band Wings, released on 25 March 1976. Issued at the height of the band's popularity, it reached the top spot on the US album chart—the band's fourth consecutive album to do so—and peaked at number 2 on the UK album chart. Both singles from the album also reached the top 5 of the UK and US singles charts, with "Silly Love Songs" reaching number 1 in the US.

The album was recorded and released in the midst of Wings' highly successful Wings Over the World tour, with songs from the album performed on the tour after its release. Subsequently, performances of "Let 'Em In", "Time to Hide", "Silly Love Songs" and "Beware My Love" were included on the live album Wings over America, released in December 1976.

In response to critics who believed Wings was merely a vehicle for Paul McCartney, the album featured every member of the band taking lead vocals on at least one song, and two songs from the album are written or co-written by band members other than the McCartneys.

== History ==
After a series of concerts in Australia in November 1975, Wings took a break from the tour to spend the holidays with their families and in January 1976 booked time at Abbey Road Studios in London to finish the recording of Wings at the Speed of Sound begun late the previous year. It was the first time Wings had recorded a full album in England since Red Rose Speedway (1973). Due to tour commitments, Wings were not allowed to record in another location. By the end of February, the album was complete, and Wings went back on the road.

Around the time of the studio sessions for Wings at the Speed of Sound, Wings were facing criticism for being merely a vehicle for McCartney. He encouraged each of the band members to contribute a song during the sessions. McCartney had previously attempted to create a democratic album in the proposed double LP of Red Rose Speedway, though his record label rejected it.

Engineer Peter Henderson later commented, "I remember one of my first engineering jobs, working with Paul McCartney on Wings at the Speed of Sound — he'd do two vocal takes and ask, 'Which is the better one?' And when he played guitar, he'd really lean into it and give it everything he got." Two tracks ("The Note You Never Wrote" and "Warm and Beautiful") were arranged by Fiachra Trench.

== Recording ==
The album was recorded at Abbey Road in two different periods of sessions: initial sessions took place in August/September and October 1975, with work resuming in January–February 1976. During the playback of "Must Do Something About It", Paul heard drummer Joe English singing and decided to have him take the lead vocal. In "Cook of the House", McCartney played the double-bass, while "Silly Love Songs" was arranged in a disco-style, in a similar fashion to Al Green's "Sha La La". Fiachra Trench had the Gabriel String Quartet adding strings to "The Note You Never Wrote".

== Artwork ==
The cover artwork was designed by Aubrey Powell of Hipgnosis; Hipgnosis had designed the artworks for Band on the Run (1973) and Venus and Mars (1975). Shot by Linda and Powell, the artwork features the album title against the marquee of the Leicester Square Theatre in London. Powell said that it shot early in the morning on the top of an aerial work platform during a cold night: "We set it up at night and we shot it with available light [...] the light that came through on a long-time exposure from the opaque Perspex of the actual cinema. It only took us a couple of hours, then it was all back to [Paul's] for a cup of coffee." For the inner sleeve, Paul commissioned a painting by Humphrey Ocean, which depicts the doors of a theater opening to a Robert Ellis photograph of the band underneath a banner reading Speed of Sound. McCartney enjoyed his painting so much that he employed Ocean as the artist for the Wings over America tour. The inner sleeve also contains photographs from the recording sessions taken by Linda, while the back cover features multiple-exposure photographs of the band members by Clive Arrowsmith, arranged in five rows—similar to the Beatles' A Hard Day's Night (1964) album cover.

== Release ==
Wings at the Speed of Sound was released in the United States on 25 March 1976, and a week later in the United Kingdom. (Note: The book Wings: The Story of a Band on the Run lists the release date as 22 March 1976.) Despite Capitol Records' requests, McCartney initially refused to release any singles, telling a journalist: "We've released the album before any singles, mainly because the radio stations haven't been told what our preference is, and they can decide for themselves. And they'll play various cuts and see which rises to the surface."

The album reached number 2 in the United Kingdom (and was the 4th best-selling album of 1976). It became McCartney's most successful American chart album since his days in the Beatles, spending seven nonconsecutive weeks at number 1 throughout the summer (blocking the new Beatles compilation Rock 'n' Roll Music, which reached number 2). Wings at the Speed of Sound sold 3.5 million copies worldwide.

Much of the album's success can be attributed to its two singles: "Silly Love Songs", a response to his critics, which became one of 1976's biggest-selling singles, followed by "Let 'Em In", which also scaled the singles charts. Amid all this, Wings finally went to North America for the Wings Over America Tour, playing McCartney's first shows there in ten years (after the Beatles' final tour of America in 1966) to euphoric reaction; four selections from At the Speed of Sound were included in the tour setlist: "Let 'Em In", "Silly Love Songs", "Time to Hide" and "Beware My Love".

Denny Laine covered "Time to Hide" and "The Note You Never Wrote" in 1996 on his album Denny Laine Performs the Hits of Wings.

== Critical reception ==
Professional ratings
Review scores
Source	Rating
AllMusic	2/5 stars
Classic Rock	7/10
The Essential Rock Discography	4/10
MusicHound Rock	2/5
PopMatters	5/10 stars
Q	1/5 stars
Record Collector	3/5 stars
The Rolling Stone Album Guide	3/5 stars
Sounds	3/5 stars
The Village Voice	B−

Wings at the Speed of Sound received lukewarm critical reviews. Stephen Holden, writing in Rolling Stone, described it as a "Day with the McCartneys" concept album. The introduction, "Let 'Em In" was perceived as an invitation to join the McCartneys on this fantasy day, with explanation of their philosophy ("Silly Love Songs"), a lunch break ("Cook of the House"), and a chance to get to know McCartney's friends (Denny Laine in "The Note You Never Wrote", Jimmy McCulloch in "Wino Junko", etc.). Reviewing in The New York Times, John Rockwell called the album "a more refreshing testimony to Mr. McCartney's current skills and ambitions than the earlier, more pretentious [Venus and Mars] was." Nevertheless, Rockwell noted that McCartney, compared to his Beatles works, has "settled into his solo career for the straightforward production of 'disposable' pop".

Chris Welch of Melody Maker wrote a quite favorable review: "This is not an album that hits you with the sustained power of Band on the Run or Venus and Mars. Much good music then on an album that will engender fierce comparisons with the past two albums, but will increase the growing worldwide appeal of Wings." More negatively, Sounds magazine's Barbara Charone called Wings at the Speed of Sound "a major disappointment", criticising it for lacking the "magic and excitement" of Wings' live shows. In The Village Voice, Robert Christgau found that McCartney's bandmates were "disgracefully third-rate".

In a retrospective review, AllMusic's Stephen Thomas Erlewine stated that Wings at the Speed of Sound is not as cohesive as Venus and Mars, which he attributed to the album being more of a band effort, "not because Wings was not a band in the proper sense, but because nobody else in the band pulled as much weight as McCartney". Although he highlighted some strong efforts such as "Beware My Love", Erlewine ultimately called the album one of McCartney's "most transient works". Author Howard Sounes said that, although the album featured Wings' strongest lineup, most of the tracks were "mediocre". Erlewine and Sounes both criticised Linda's singing on "Cook of the House" as awkward and badly sung. Ultimate Classic Rock's Nick DeRiso found that McCartney's attempts to democratise the band "doomed" the album, writing: "The tossed-together At the Speed of Sound simply had too much Wings, and not enough Paul McCartney." Vincent Benitez Jr. wrote that Wings at the Speed of Sound was an "artistic disappointment" compared to Band on the Run and Venus and Mars. More positively, John Blaney calls Wings at the Speed of Sound an "underrated gem" and a "near perfect pop" album that represents Wings' "finest moment". The author Luca Perasi writes that the album was a "smart marketing move by McCartney" to "strengthen Wings, presenting them as a real group with an album which had room for everyone to shine."

== Reissues ==
Wings at the Speed of Sound was first reissued by Columbia in the early 1980s. Its first CD release came on 20 June 1989 by Columbia, followed by EMI on 10 July. On 7 July 1993, Wings at the Speed of Sound was remastered and reissued on compact disc as part of The Paul McCartney Collection series. It included three bonus tracks: the single "Walking in the Park with Eloise" and its B-side "Bridge on the River Suite", which were released under the name the Country Hams, and the Wings track "Sally G" (the B-side to their single "Junior's Farm"). All were recorded in Nashville in 1974.

On 23 September 2014, the album was remastered and re-issued by Hear Music/Concord Music Group as part of the fifth set of releases of the Paul McCartney Archive Collection, alongside Venus and Mars. The reissue featured seven bonus tracks, including demos, the John Bonham version of "Beware My Love" and the version of "Must Do Something About It" with Paul McCartney on vocals.

== Track listing ==
All tracks written by Paul and Linda McCartney, except where noted.

Side one
No.	Title	Writer(s)	Lead vocals	Length
1.	"Let 'Em In"		P. McCartney	5:10
2.	"The Note You Never Wrote"		Denny Laine	4:21
3.	"She's My Baby"		P. McCartney	3:08
4.	"Beware My Love"		P. McCartney with L. McCartney	6:28
5.	"Wino Junko"	Jimmy McCulloch, Colin Eric Allen	Jimmy McCulloch	5:21

Side two
No.	Title	Writer(s)	Lead vocals	Length
6.	"Silly Love Songs"		P. McCartney with L. McCartney and Laine	5:54
7.	"Cook of the House"		L. McCartney	2:39
8.	"Time to Hide"	Laine	Laine	4:32
9.	"Must Do Something About It"		Joe English	3:43
10.	"San Ferry Anne"		P. McCartney	2:07
11.	"Warm and Beautiful"		P. McCartney	3:13
Total length:				46:36

Additional tracks on the 1993 CD reissue
No.	Title	Writer(s)	Lead vocals	Length
12.	"Walking in the Park with Eloise"	Jim McCartney	Instrumental	3:10
13.	"Bridge on the River Suite"		Instrumental	3:11
14.	"Sally G"		P. McCartney	3:40

== Personnel ==
- Paul McCartney – vocals, bass guitar, acoustic and electric guitars, keyboards, double bass on "Cook of the House"
- Linda McCartney – vocals, keyboards
- Denny Laine – vocals, acoustic and electric guitars, bass guitar, piano, harmonica
- Jimmy McCulloch – vocals, acoustic and electric guitars, bass guitar
- Joe English – vocals, drums, percussion

Additional musicians

- Tony Dorsey – trombone
- Thaddeus Richard – saxophone, clarinet, flute
- Steve Howard – trumpet, flugelhorn
- Howie Casey – saxophone
- George Tidwell – trumpet
- John Bonham – drums (Archive Collection issue version of "Beware My Love" only)
- Uncredited session musicians – orchestrations

Production

- Paul McCartney – producer
- Peter Henderson – engineer

== Charts ==
=== Weekly charts ===
Chart (1976–77)	Peak position
Australian Albums (Kent Music Report)	2
Canada Top Albums/CDs (RPM)	1
Dutch Albums (Album Top 100)	3
German Albums (Offizielle Top 100)	32
Japanese Albums (Oricon)	4
New Zealand Albums (RMNZ)	2
Norwegian Albums (VG-lista)	2
Spanish Albums (El Musical)	15
Swedish Albums (Sverigetopplistan)	7
UK Albums (Official Charts)	2
US Billboard 200	1
Chart (2014)	Peak position
Belgian Albums (Ultratop Flanders)	72
Belgian Albums (Ultratop Wallonia)	87
Dutch Albums (Album Top 100)	52
French Albums (SNEP)	120
Italian Albums (FIMI)	76
UK Albums (Official Charts)	64
US Billboard 200	45
US Top Catalog Albums (Billboard)	4

=== Year-end charts ===
Chart (1976)	Position
Australian Albums (Kent Music Report)	9
Canada Top Albums/CDs (RPM)	2
Dutch Albums (Album Top 100)	26
New Zealand Albums (RMNZ)	14
UK Albums (OCC)	10
US Billboard 200	3

== Certifications and sales ==
Certifications and sales for Wings at the Speed of Sound
Region	Certification	Certified units/sales
France (SNEP)	Gold	100,000^{*}
Japan (Oricon)	—	79,000
United Kingdom (BPI)	Gold	100,000^{^}
United States (RIAA)	Platinum	1,000,000^{^}
^{*} Sales figures based on certification alone.^{^} Shipments figures based on certification alone.
