= Working Classical =

1999 studio album by Paul McCartney with the London Symphony Orchestra

Studio album by Paul McCartney with the London Symphony Orchestra and the Loma Mar Quartet
- Released: 1 November 1999
- Recorded: October 1998, February 1999
- Studio: EMI Studios, Abbey Road
- Genre: Classical, chamber music
- Length: 61:35
- Label: EMI Classics
- Producer: John Fraser

Paul McCartney chronology
Run Devil Run (1999)	Working Classical (1999)	Liverpool Sound Collage (2000)

Professional ratings
Review scores
Source	Rating
AllMusic	3/5 stars
Encyclopedia of Popular Music	3/5 stars

Working Classical is Paul McCartney's third full-length release of original classical music as a double LP and as a single CD, and was issued less than a month after Run Devil Run's release in 1999.

== Background and recording ==
Following up on 1997's Standing Stone, the concept behind Working Classical was to place pre-existing (and in some cases, very well known) McCartney songs into an orchestral context. Specially for this project, McCartney also unveiled some new pieces, namely "Haymakers", "Midwife", "Spiral" and "Tuesday". A different performance of "A Leaf" was originally released on 21 April 1995 on a CD single, and is presented here in a new recording.

Performing the new arrangements are the London Symphony Orchestra and the Loma Mar Quartet, with special orchestrations arranged by noted musicians Richard Rodney Bennett, Jonathan Tunick and Andy Stein.

== Album title ==
The title of this project is a pun on the phrase "working class", in the sense that McCartney, despite his elevated stature, still cherishes his Liverpool roots and is proud of them. Mirroring this ideology is his pride in his rock and roll songs and willingness to transfer them into the "elevated" classical music genre.

== Release and reception ==
Paul McCartney's Working Classical was another success in that genre, even though this time it failed to dent the regular US album charts, and was better received critically than his previous effort, Standing Stone. His subsequent forays into the classical realm are 2006's Ecce Cor Meum and 2011's Ocean's Kingdom.

== Track listing ==
All pieces by Paul McCartney.

1. "Junk" – 2:49
2. "A Leaf" – 11:08
3. "Haymakers" – 3:33
4. "Midwife" – 3:33
5. "Spiral" – 10:02
6. "Warm and Beautiful" – 2:31
7. "My Love" – 3:48
8. "Maybe I'm Amazed" – 2:04
9. "Calico Skies" – 1:52
10. "Golden Earth Girl" – 1:57
11. "Somedays" – 3:05
12. "Tuesday" – 12:26
13. "She's My Baby" – 1:47
14. "The Lovely Linda" – 0:54
