= HMCS Lady Evelyn =

Royal Canadian Navy patrol boat

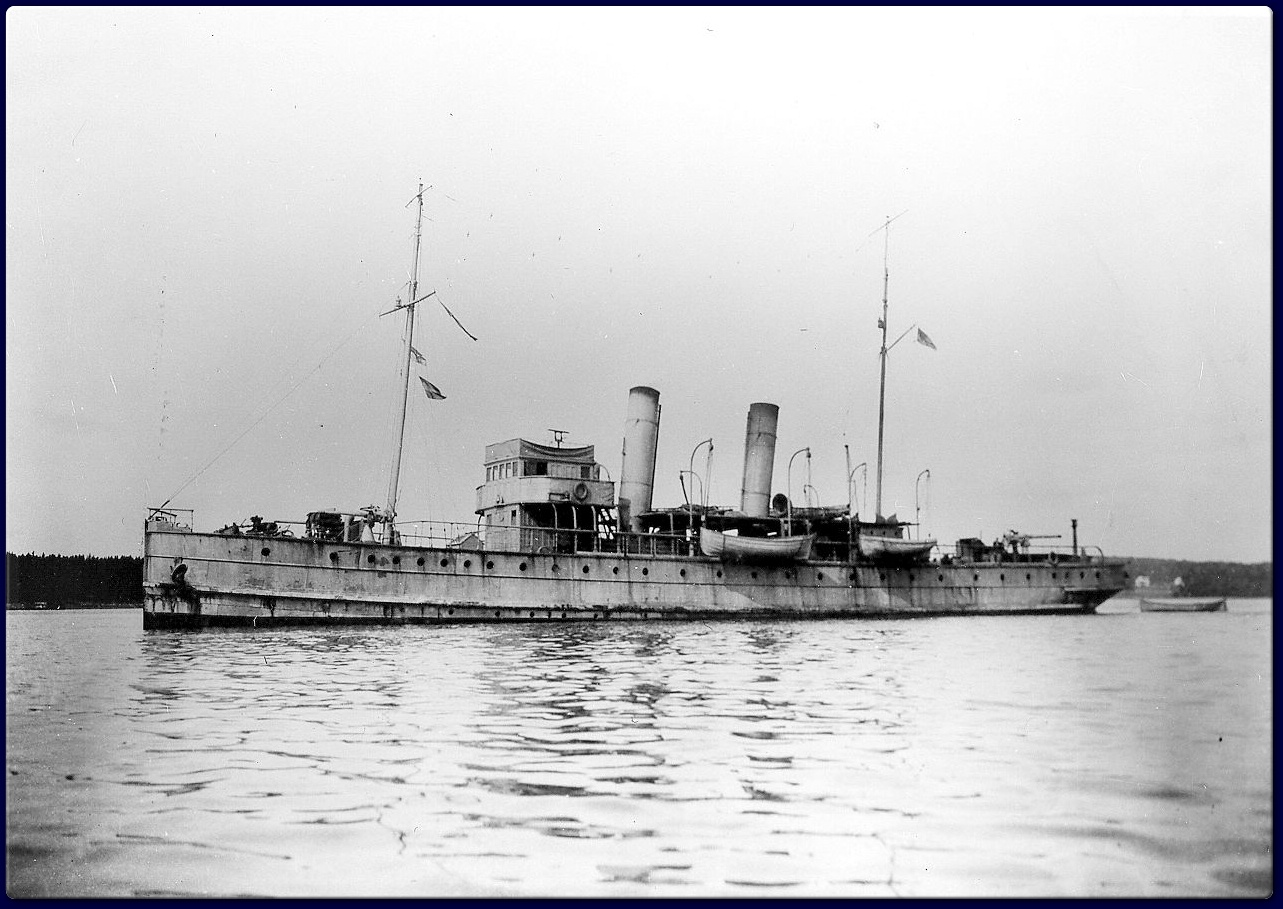
- HMCS Lady Evelyn during the First World War

History
- Name: Deerhound
- Builder: John Jones and Sons, Tranmere, Merseyside
- Yard number: 180
- Launched: 1901
- Completed: May 1901
- In service: 1901
- Out of service: 1907
- Fate: Transferred to Canadian government 1907

Canada
- Name: Lady Evelyn
- Acquired: 1907
- Commissioned: 1917, as HMCS Lady Evelyn
- Decommissioned: 1919
- Fate: Broken up 1936

General characteristics
- Type: Patrol vessel
- Tonnage: 482 GRT
- Length: 189 ft (57.6 m) pp.
- Beam: 26.1 ft (8.0 m)
- Draught: 9.5 ft (2.9 m)
- Propulsion: Triple expansion steam engine, 2 × shafts
- Speed: 9 knots (17 km/h; 10 mph)
- Armament: 1 × 4 in (102 mm) gun; 1 × QF 12-pounder 12 cwt naval gun

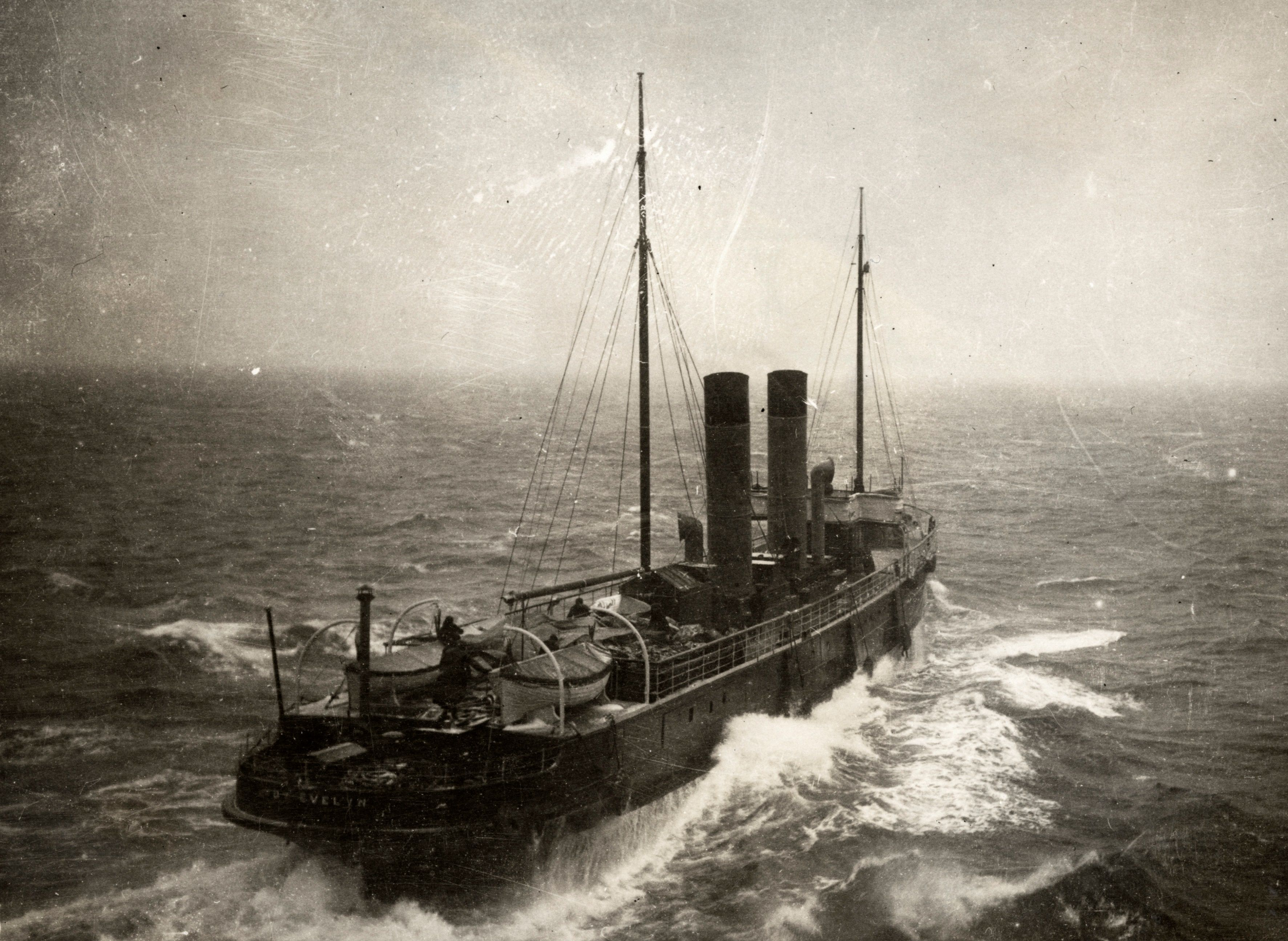
HMCS Lady Evelyn in 1914

HMCS Lady Evelyn was a commissioned patrol boat of the Royal Canadian Navy during the First World War. Originally built as a passenger liner, Deerhound, she was acquired in 1907 by the Canadian government and renamed Lady Evelyn for use by the post office. After the war, she was sold for civilian service and scrapped in 1936.

== Description ==
Originally constructed as a passenger liner, the ship was 189 feet (57.6 m) long between perpendiculars with a beam of 26.1 feet (8.0 m) and a draught of 9.5 feet (2.9 m). The ship had a tonnage of 482 gross register tons (GRT). The ship was powered by a triple-expansion steam engine driving two shafts. The ship had a maximum speed of 9 knots (17 km/h; 10 mph). In Royal Canadian Navy service the ship was armed with one 4-inch (102 mm) gun and one QF 12-pounder 12 cwt naval gun. (Note: "QF" is the abbreviation for quick-firing gun. "Cwt" is the abbreviation for hundredweight, 20 cwt referring to the weight of the gun.)

== Service history ==
Deerhound was built by John Jones and Sons in 1901 at their yard in Tranmere, Merseyside with the yard number 180. (Note: The Miramar Ship Index has the ship constructed at Birkenhead.) The ship was constructed for the North Pier Steam Ship Company Limited of Blackpool and completed in May 1901. In 1905 the North Pier Steam Ship Company sold the vessel to the West Cornwall Steam Ship Company. From 1905 to 1907 she operated between Penzance and the Isles of Scilly, replacing the older ship, Lady of the Isles.

Canada's Postmaster General purchased Deerhound in 1907 at a cost of some $65,000 to act as a mail tender for transatlantic steamers. Renamed Lady Evelyn, she met ocean liners in the Gulf of St. Lawrence to transfer mail to and from trains at Rimouski, Quebec in order to speed its delivery. She replaced Rhoda, an older and smaller ship that had previously performed these duties. In 1914 Lady Evelyn was involved in the rescue of survivors from RMS Empress of Ireland when that ship sank following a collision off Rimouski.

Lady Evelyn was one of a number of Canadian government ships taken over by the Royal Canadian Navy during the First World War. Commissioned in June 1917, she spent her career on the East Coast. The ship's ability as a patrol vessel was limited by her 9-knot maximum speed. However, the ship was still assigned to seaward patrols against German U-boats, even though the ship was not capable of operating in heavy seas. At the time of the December 1917 Halifax Explosion, Lady Evelyn was patrolling off the harbour's approaches. On 18 August 1918 Lady Evelyn dropped depth charges on a possible submarine contact after spotting a periscope. As attacks on shipping in Canadian waters increased, Lady Evelyn was used to escort convoys. Following the war, the ship was decommissioned in 1919.

In 1921 Lady Evelyn was sold to the Gulf of St Lawrence Sg & Tdg Company of Montreal. A year later, the Howe Sound Navigation Co. brought Lady Evelyn to Vancouver. In 1923 she was bought by the Union Steamship Company of British Columbia for service along the West Coast and remained with them until 1936. The ship was sold for scrap and broken up in Bedwell Bay in the fourth quarter of 1936.

== Sources ==
- Armstrong, John Griffith (2002). The Halifax Explosion and the Royal Canadian Navy: Inquiry and Intrigue. Vancouver: UBC Press. ISBN 0-7748-0891-8.
- Gill, Crispin (1975). The Isles of Scilly. London: David & Charles. ISBN 0-7153-6957-1.
- Johnston, William; Rawling, William G.P.; Gimblett, Richard H. & MacFarlane, John (2010). The Seabound Coast: The Official History of the Royal Canadian Navy, 1867–1939. Vol. 1. Toronto: Dundurn Press. ISBN 978-1-55488-908-2.
- Macpherson, Ken & Barrie, Ron (2002). The Ships of Canada's Naval Forces 1910–2002 (Third ed.). St. Catharines, Ontario: Vanwell Publishing. ISBN 1-55125-072-1.
- "Deerhound (1109680)". Miramar Ship Index.
