= A Leaf =

Single by Paul McCartney
- Released: 21 April 1995
- Recorded: 23 March 1995
- Genre: Classical
- Label: EMI Classics (CD LEAF I/7243 8 82176 2 0)
- Songwriter: Paul McCartney
- Producer: John Fraser

Paul McCartney singles chronology
"Transpiritual Stomp" (1993)	"A Leaf" (1995)	"Come Together" (1995)

A Leaf is a classical piece written by Paul McCartney, with assistance from John Fraser, and performed by Anya Alexeyev on piano. The piece is split into 7 parts. It was recorded live in front of Prince Charles as part of the "An Evening with Paul McCartney & Friends" concert, on 23 March 1995 at Royal College of Music, and it was debuted on US radio as part of a radio special titled Classical McCartney.

An orchestral version, performed by the London Symphony Orchestra, appears on McCartney's 1999 album Working Classical. Another orchestral version was recorded on 23 July 1996, at AIR Studios, in London, but remains unreleased.

An original arrangement for piano duet of A Leaf is part of the album British Music for Piano Four Hands. Commissioned by XXI-21 Productions Inc., this album was recorded in 2009 by Duo Caron, on Fazioli piano, at the Bon-Pasteur Chapel in Montreal, Canada.

== Track listing ==
1. "Andante Semplice" – 1:12
2. "Poco Piu Mosso" – 1:19
3. "Allegro Ritmico" – 1:51
4. "Andante" – 2:04
5. "Allegro Ma Non Tanto" – 1:15
6. "Moderato" – 1:18
7. "Andante Semplice (II)" – 0:54
