= Alan Belkin =

Canadian composer, organist, pianist

Alan Belkin (born July 5, 1951) is a Canadian composer, organist, pianist as well as a pedagogue.

== Early life ==
Alan Belkin was born in Montreal. He began piano studies with Philip Cohen, then he studied organ with Dom André Laberge and with Bernard Lagacé. He studied composition with Marvin Duchow and in 1983, he got his doctorate from the Juilliard School in New York under the tutelage of American composers David Diamond and Elliott Carter.

== Career ==
Since 1984, Belkin has taught theory and composition at University of Montreal. He is acknowledged by Canadian Music Centre as an associate composer. He is now retired, and teaches online.

Alan Belkin maintains an English, French, German and Spanish web site which includes free texts on harmony, orchestration, counterpoint, musical form and other musical subjects. Alan Belkin's works have been played in Canada, Mexico, Europe, and the United States.

Belkin's YouTube channel has more than 42,000 subscribers and contains both his music and much pedagogical material.

== Works ==
- Symphony No. 1
- Symphony No. 2
- Symphony No. 3
- Symphony No. 4
- Symphony No. 5
- Symphony No. 6 ("Phantoms")
- Symphony No. 7
- Symphony No. 8
- Violin Concerto
- Violin Concerto #2
- Piano Concerto
- Piano Concerto #2
- Cello Concerto
- Double Concerto for violin and cello
- Viola Concerto
- Sonata for piano solo
- Sonata for viola and piano (2006)
- Petite Suite, commissioned by the Duo Caron (versions for one piano and for two pianos)
- Fantasies and Fugues for piano solo
- Four Etudes for piano solo
- Voices for guitar, commissioned by Peter McCutcheon
- Adagio I (Electroacoustic)
- Adagio II (Electroacoustic)
- 6 Songs for a Young Man
- Four Emily Dickinson Songs
- Do Not Go Gentle (choir, unaccompanied)
- String Quartet No. 1
- String Quartet No. 2
- String Quartet No. 3
- String Quartet No. 4
- Adagio Symphonique pour Cordes
- Elegy for String Orchestra
- Symphonic Movement No. 2, for Strings
- Trio, for violin, cello, and piano
- 12 Preludes and Fugues for piano
- 12 Preludes for piano
- Nonet #2 (also exists in a version for piano and string quartet)
- Symphonic Movement No. 3
- Flute Sonata
- Clarinet Sonata (with piano)
- Piano Sonata #2
- Clarinet Quartet
- Ragtime, for orchestra
- Music When Soft Voices Die, for choir
- Concertino for Clarinet and Strings (Night Secrets)
- Living with Daniel (melodrama for narrator and piano)
- Cadenzas and Songs, for violin and piano

== Discography ==
Halogènes – excerpt of Night Labyrinth (1987): Adagio I (UMMUS UMM-101, 1990)

== Honours ==
Prix d'excellence en enseignement, catégorie professeur agrégé University of Montreal (1994)

== Publications ==
- Musical Composition: Craft and Art, Yale University Press, 2018
- Computer Music Journal
- Journal of the Canadian University Music Society
- Musicworks

== Notes ==
http://www.musique.umontreal.ca/personnel/belkin_a.html
