= Mail tender =

Ship used for carrying letters and parcels

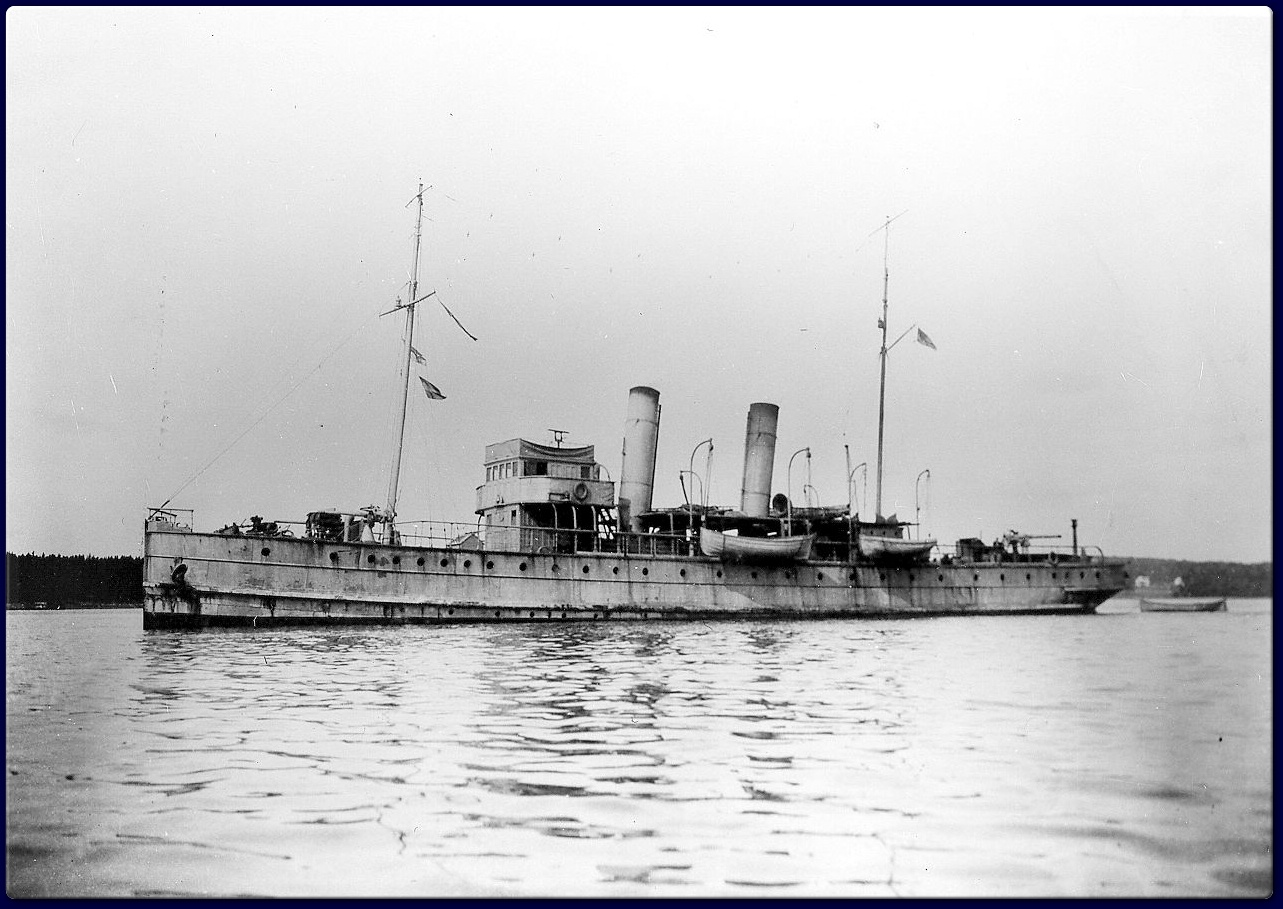
HMCS Lady Evelyn, the mail tender for the Saint Lawrence River, during later military service in WWI

A mail tender is a small steamboat used to carry mail. As a tender it only carries mail for short distances between ship and shore, ferrying it to and from a large mail steamer.

The use of tenders for loading passengers and their luggage was well established even before the Edwardian heyday of ocean liners as the major means of intercontinental transport. They avoided the need to wait for these large ships to enter harbour and be docked, sometimes involving the wait for suitable tides. Tenders were also used by intermediate ports, where they could stand out to sea beyond a harbour bar and exchange passengers, without the large ship needing to enter port. In the Victorian times of several postal deliveries a day, speed was of the essence in transporting mails and the slightest time advantage would be seized upon.

Passenger tenders such as the SS Traffic could be quite large, being able to ferry 1,000 passengers – a comparable number, although a shorter journey, to the liner itself. Mail tenders were often much smaller than this. Passenger tenders were usually owned by the shipping lines and would only service their own vessels, mail tenders were often owned by national post offices and would attend any mail ships.

In his memoir The Uncommercial Traveller, Charles Dickens describes a voyage from New York to Liverpool on Cunard's first screw steamship Russia, and meeting the mail tender out of Queenstown, Ireland. Queenstown, today named Cobh, was an important port for the Irish transatlantic trade. Being only a small harbour though, it relied on tenders. Only a few passengers were to be put ashore on Dicken's voyage and so they too were ferried by the mail tender. In 1868 the Post Office Surveyor and novelist Anthony Trollope gave Dickens another encounter with a mail tender, when their ships crossed paths in New York. Possibly trading on his role as consultant for the trans-atlantic mail service, he arranged to have a mail tender ferry him between ships, merely to meet his friend Dickens.

With the development of fast railways, passages along a coast could also be speeded up by mail tenders. In 1907 the Lady Evelyn was purchased by Canada's Postmaster General to act as a mail tender for the mouth of the Saint Lawrence River on Canada's East Coast. This was to replace an older steamer, the Rhoda, described in parliament by Lemieux as 'a disgrace'. Liners for the inland port of Quebec City would pass by the small tender port of Rimouski, 200 miles downstream. Mail offloaded by tender here could be taken by train to Quebec much faster than on the liner.

In the years immediately before World War I, Queenstown was still a regular intermediate stop by tender for the liners Lusitania and Mauretania. Fishguard in South West Wales also developed, particularly as a mail offloading port from where the mail for London could be rushed by train along the West Wales and South Wales Main Lines, arriving only about five hours later. The mail tender came alongside first and was turned around in as little as fifteen minutes. Passengers were then carried in a separate tender, taking a slightly more leisurely twenty five minutes.

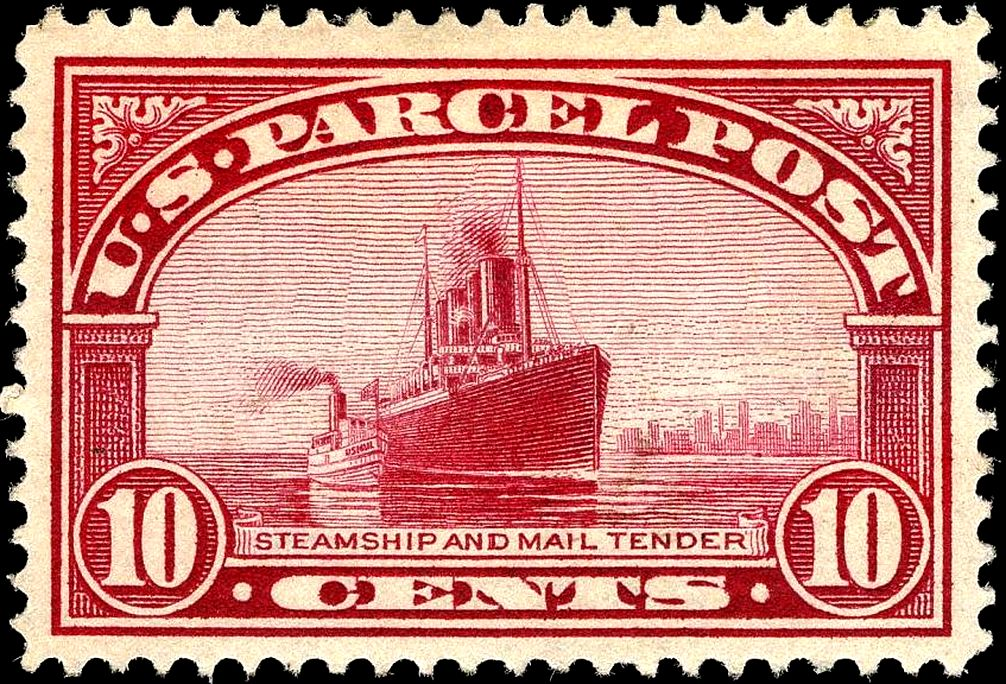
A mail ship and its tender appear on the 10 cent US Parcel Post stamp of 1912

== See also ==
- Dispatch boat
