= Quebec-Wallonia-Brussels Agency for Youth =

The Quebec-Wallonia-Brussels Agency for Youth (in French, "agence Québec Wallonie Bruxelles pour la jeunesse") (AQWBJ) is a semi-public international relations body that offers young people from Quebec, aged 18 to 30 years, the opportunity to gain experience in other countries through various programs involving missions and training courses in Wallonia and Brussels.

The AQWBJ has collaborated with the Parlement Jeunesse du Québec.

Since 2007, AQWBJ has been renamed the Quebec-Wallonia-Brussels Office for Youth. The office is now an integral part of LOJIQ, promoting the professional and personal development of Quebecers aged 18 to 35, in Quebec, Canada, internationally and particularly in the Francophonie.
