= Time to Hide =

1976 song by Wings

Song by Wings

from the album Wings at the Speed of Sound
- Released: 26 March 1976
- Recorded: January - February 1976
- Studio: Abbey Road Studios, London
- Genre: Hard rock
- Length: 4:32
- Label: Capitol
- Songwriter: Denny Laine
- Producer: Paul McCartney

"Time to Hide" is a song written by Denny Laine that was first released on Wings' 1976 album Wings at the Speed of Sound. A live version was also released on Wings' 1976 live album Wings over America and was included in the 1980 film Rockshow.

== Writing and recording ==
"Time to Hide" was Laine's first solo composition to appear on a Wings album, although he had some previous co-writing credits with Paul McCartney. Laine brought the song to the band at a recording session on 15 January 1976 and much of that session was devoted to learning and arranging it. Laine said that "The fact that Paul wanted to record it was a compliment, so his contribution was the arrangement, helping with the arrangement, putting it together as a Wings song." At the time, Laine's title was "If I Have to Run".

An initial unsuccessful attempt was made to record the song on 27 January 1976. A successful recording was made at sessions on 30 and 31 January. A new bass drum part was overdubbed on 3 February. Harmony vocals and a horn section were added later in February.

On the song, Laine plays bass guitar and harmonica in addition to singing the lead vocal. Jimmy McCulloch plays lead guitar, splitting the lead guitar work with Paul McCartney, who plays his guitar part using a Gizmotron. Paul McCartney also plays organ and provides backing vocals, and Linda McCartney plays keyboards and sings backing vocals. Joe English plays drums. The song also incorporates a horn section consisting of Steve "Tex" Howard on trumpet, Thaddeus Richard and Howie Casey on saxophone and Tony Dorsey on trombone.

== Lyrics and music ==
The Beatles FAQ author Robert Rodriguez described "Time to Hide" song as an "I'm a bad man on the run" song. The lyrics have the protagonist running away from his lover and from the law, hoping for time to hide away for a while. He tries to reassure the lover that he isn't really running away from her.

Ultimate Classic Rock critic Nick DeRiso described the song as incorporating "heavy blues interplay of guitar and a walking bass line from McCartney," which produces a sound that sounds like a combination of the Beatles and Cream. DeRiso described Laine's vocal performance as being "as searing as it is insistent." The song also showed off Wings' ability to harmonize the vocals. According to Laine "We'd go to the half-tempo thing in the middle, and that was to show off the harmonies." Rodriguez suggested that one influence on the song was Simon and Garfunkel's "Somewhere They Can't Find Me".

== Reception ==
Beatles' biographer John Blaney considered "Time to Hide" to be "as competent as anything McCartney contributed to [Wings at the Speed of Sound]. Music critic Rick Atkinson called it "one of the high points of the album." DeRiso rated "Time to Hide" to be Laine's all-time best song and the 5th best song on Wings at the Speed of Sound. He also praised Laines vocal performance as being "quite possibly his all-time best". DeRiso also described the song as "Laine's most propulsive contribution to Wings, and a highlight of the Rockshow concert movie. Fort Worth Star-Telegram critic Gerry Barker called it "one of the best rockers Wings has ever put together" and said that without the horn section and the song's "polish" and it could sound like a Bad Company song. Albuquerque Journal critic Charles Andrews said that it may be the best song on the album, stating that "it's not an immediate grabber, but reveals during repeated listenings that Wings have given it the best instrumental treatment on the album" and particularly praised how the horn section was used.

Miami News critic Jon Marlowe called it a "real good rock song". Uncut critic Peter Watts described it as a "slinky, sparse, stadium-friendly rocker". PopMatters critic John Bergstrom called it "a bluesy rocker with the slightest hint at an edge". Music journalist Andrew Wild called it "an excellent rock song" that is driven by a "bouncing, sexy bass line."

On the other hand, music professor Vincent P. Benitez felt that the song deserved "little comment". Sun Herald critic John Bialas called it "a lame composition [that] sounds like a National Lampoon parody of George Harrison's "Living in the Material World". Los Angeles Times critic Robert Hilburn called the song "weak". Hartford Courant critic Henry McNulty described it as "lackluster".

== Live performances ==
"Time to Hide" was included in the set list of many the 1976 shows of the Wings Over the World tour. Originally, when Wings added songs from Wings at the Speed of Sound to the setlist in early 1976 they only included "Silly Love Songs", "Let 'Em In" and "Beware My Love", but in May they added "Time to Hide.

A recording from these shows was included on the 1976 live album Wings over America and also on the 1980 concert film Rockshow. The version included on Wings Over America was taken from the show at Madison Square Garden in New York on 25 May 1976. Rodriguez felt that the song "really came to life" in the live version. Something Else! critic Jimmy Nelson said that the live version finds "Laine brilliantly recapturing the raw emotion of his early R&B-sides with the Moodies."
