= Cook of the House =

Single by Wings

from the album Wings at the Speed of Sound
- A-side: "Silly Love Songs"
- Released: 1 April 1976 (US); 30 April 1976 (UK)
- Recorded: January–March 1976
- Studio: Abbey Road Studios, London
- Genre: Rock 'n' roll, rhythm and blues
- Length: 2:37
- Label: MPL Communications (UK); MPL Communications/Capitol (US)
- Songwriters: Paul McCartney; Linda McCartney
- Producer: Paul McCartney

Wings singles chronology
"Venus and Mars/Rock Show" (1975)	"Cook of the House" (1976)	"Let 'Em In" (1976)

"Cook of the House" is a song written by Paul and Linda McCartney that was first released on Wings' 1976 album Wings at the Speed of Sound. It was also released as the B-side to the number 1 single "Silly Love Songs." The song was included on Linda McCartney's posthumous 1998 solo album Wide Prairie.

== Music and lyrics ==
"Cook of the House" is a "1950s-style rock 'n' roll song." Linda McCartney sings the lead vocal, her first lead vocal performance for Wings. Paul McCartney plays the same double bass Bill Black played on Elvis Presley songs. Other musicians on the song are Denny Laine and Jimmy McCulloch on guitar and Joe English on drums. Either Thaddeus Richard or Howie Casey plays saxophone. The song opens with the sound of bacon and chips frying in the key of E-flat. This sound effect is the only part of the song recorded in stereo; most of the track is in mono to enhance the retro feel.

"Cook of the House" was inspired during the McCartneys' stay at a rented house in Australia during their 1975 tour, and was written in November of that year. A plaque in the kitchen stated "Wherever I serve my guests, they like my kitchen best," which inspired some of the lyrics. Most of the remaining lyrics came from the McCartneys looking at the food in the kitchen and listing the items in the song.

The song was most likely recorded on 20 January 1976.

== Reception ==
"Cook of the House" was largely panned by critics. Rolling Stone called the song a "celebration of scatterbrained wife-in-the-kitchen coziness." Authors Chip Madinger and Mark Easter claim that Paul McCartney's double bass playing is the song's only redeeming value. Author Robert Rodriguez calls it an "embarrassment," and author Tim Riley calls it a "feminist's nightmare." Paul McCartney biographer Howard Sounes praised the song's production values but called it a "weak song" which was not sung well. Entertainment Weekly described it as a "simpleminded domestic anthem" and claimed it was "genuinely terrible." On the other hand, Wings' guitarist Jimmy McCulloch was happy for Linda's lead vocal opportunity and considered the song a "tribute to her talent of whipping up a meal in no time." Allmusic critic Stephen Thomas Erlewine found the song charming, though acknowledging that it is "awkwardly sung." Paul McCartney biographer Chris Welch called it "one of the most popular items" on Wings at the Speed of Sound.

== Other appearances ==
"Cook of the House" appeared as the B-side of Wings' 1976 single "Silly Love Songs." That represented the second time a singer other than Paul McCartney sang the lead vocal on a Wings' single, the first being Denny Laine's vocal on "I Lie Around," the B-side to "Live and Let Die." Linda also sang "Cook of the House" live on Wings' 1979 UK tour. "Cook of the House" was included on Linda McCartney's 1998 posthumous solo album Wide Prairie. The Eastmans covered "Cook of the House" on Love in Song: An Atlanta Tribute to Sir Paul McCartney. Wings' recording was also featured on The 7" Singles Box in 2022.

== Personnel ==
According to The Paul McCartney Project:

- Linda McCartney – lead vocals
- Paul McCartney – backing vocals, double bass, piano, mellotron
- Denny Laine – backing vocals, electric guitar
- Joe English – drums
- Howie Casey – saxophone
- Thaddeus Richard – saxophone
