= Wino Junko =

Song by Wings

from the album Wings at the Speed of Sound
- Released: 28 March 1976
- Recorded: 9–15 January 1976
- Length: 5:21
- Label: Capitol
- Songwriters: Jimmy McCulloch; Colin Eric Allen
- Producer: Paul McCartney

"Wino Junko" is a song written by Jimmy McCulloch and Colin Eric Allen, and sung by McCulloch, released on Paul McCartney and Wings's fifth studio album Wings at the Speed of Sound (1976).

== Writing and recording ==
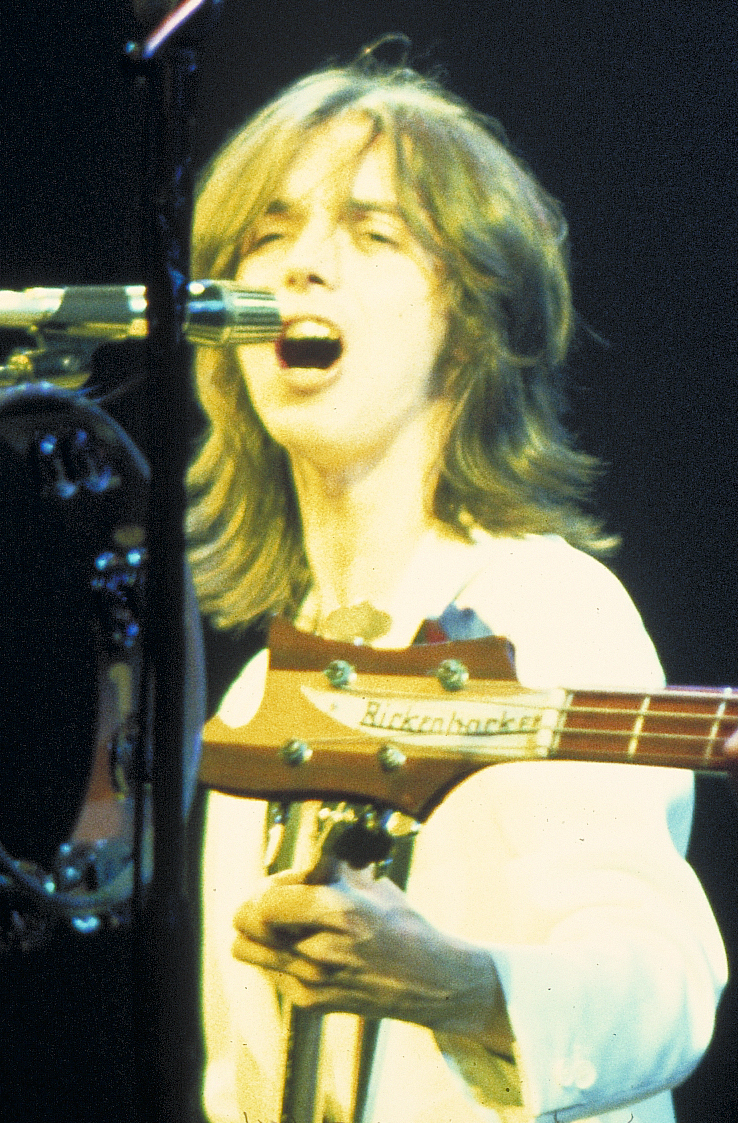
Jimmy McCulloch performing in 1976

"Wino Junko" was written by McCulloch and Allen, and is about McCulloch's use of drugs and alcohol. Jimmy McCulloch said in Little Wing: The Jimmy McCulloch Story;

At around the time I wrote the lyric I was doing some rehearsing with Jack Bruce. Also involved was STC keyboard player Ronnie Leahy. ‘Wino Junko’ was really born out of the fact that Jack – a well-documented heroin user – was also into fine wines, which at the time I thought was a bit of a contradiction. The rest of the lyric is just stringing some words and ideas together. "Doctor Tom" does actually relate to a real doctor. His name wasn't Tom, I used that 'cos it rhymed with on. He was in actual fact a private doctor used by many musicians and people in showbiz. He would, often without regard for a patient's well-being, give prescriptions out for whatever pills a person wanted – uppers, downers. So "Doctor Tom is getting on/All he does is sign his name' meant he was getting rich just by signing prescriptions."

Allen said:

I got into a situation with Jack Bruce for a short period and spent a few days running through some material at his house, much of which was odd time signature stuff. It was pretty intimidating playing with a guy who had been in a band for quite some time with the genius drummer Toby Williams...It was out of my short association with Jack that the lyrics for "Wino Junko' were born.

Wings initially recorded "Wino Junko" on 9 and 12 January 1976. On 12 January, Wings' drummer Joe English quit the band during the sessions, in part because he and his wife were homesick for the United States, but also because he had been secretly taking drugs to cope with his homesickness, and recording "Wino Junko" made him particularly uncomfortable. Wings brought Allen in to try to serve as the drummer for the song, and recorded a take with him, but were able to convince English to return to the band and continue recording the song on 13 January. McColluch recorded additions to his vocal and lead guitar parts on 14 January and English overdubbed conga drums on 15 January. On 21 January, additional overdubs were recorded, creating a mysterious sound for the song's introduction using chimes, bells and electric piano. Later that week, Paul McCartney used a vocoder to add vocal overdubs to the song.

== Lyrics and music ==
"Wino Junko" was written in a style similar to a previous McCulloch lead vocal, the Venus and Mars track "Medicine Jar". Unlike "Medicine Jar" which only addressed drug use, "Wino Junko" addressed both drug and alcohol use. McCartney biographer Ted Montgomery calls it a "pretty faithful rewrite of 'Medicine Jar' with a similar chord sequence". As Eric Luecking states in an American Songwriter review; "'Wino Junko,' tells the tale of a pill freak over some fantastic guitar work."

Miami News critic Jon Marlowe described the music as having "an early 60s sound, like Peter and Gordon", with a "good guitar break", "unusual sound" and a chorus that is similar to "Beware My Love".

Paul McCartney expressed concern about the implications of McCulloch's lyrics to "Medicine Jar" and "Wino Junko" since they seemed to be about someone who cannot resist extremes when it came to drugs and alcohol.

== Release and reception ==
In a review for PopMatters, John Bergstrom stated that "When McCartney lets his bandmates write, you get the Fleetwood Mac-on-downers trot of Jimmy McCulloch's 'Wino Junko', which throws in a vocoder for no good reason". Tom Doyle wrote that it "closed the first side of [the album] with a lifting melody". Daily Journal critic Terry Anderson called it "the most interesting song on the album." Fort Worth Star-Telegram critic Gerry Barker called it a "very pleasing ballad" and said that the "background effects work well." Indianapolis News Zach Dunkin called it "one of the better cuts" on the album, saying that it has a "simple, stay-wth-you melody." Windsor Star critic John Laycock praised the song as a "strange, nightare of inebriation". Anaheim Bulletin critic Jim Ingolio called the song "catchy", although he felt McColluch's voice is weak.

Sun Herald critic John Bialas criticized McColluch's vocals as being "unappealing and off-key". Los Angeles Times critic Robert Hilburn called the song "a very routine work". Daily Record critic Bill Donnellon described the song as "a vapid anti-drug rap in the banal tradition of [McColluch's] earlier 'Medicine Jar'". Houston Chronicle critic Dale Adamson said it has a "buried calypso beat that's just as well left unearthed."

== Credits and personnel ==
Credits adapted from the Wings at the Speed of Sound liner notes, and author John Blaney:

- Jimmy McCulloch – guitar, lead vocals
- Paul McCartney – bass, backing vocals
- Linda McCartney – keyboards, backing vocals
- Denny Laine – guitar, backing vocals
- Joe English – drums
- Unknown – vocoder
