= Beware My Love =

1976 song by Wings

- German label

Single by Wings

from the album Wings at the Speed of Sound
- A-side: "Let 'Em In"
- Released: 23 July 1976
- Recorded: 17 October 1975 – March 1976
- Studio: Abbey Road Studios, London
- Genre: Hard rock
- Length: 6:28; 5:52 (7" single edit)
- Label: Capitol
- Songwriters: Paul McCartney; Linda McCartney
- Producer: Paul McCartney

Wings singles chronology
"Silly Love Songs" (1976)	"Beware My Love" (1976)	"Maybe I'm Amazed" (1977)

"Beware My Love" is a rock song credited to Paul and Linda McCartney that was first released on the Wings 1976 album Wings at the Speed of Sound. It was also used as the B-side of the single that included "Let 'Em In". A live version recorded on June 7, 1976, in Denver, Colorado, was included on the Wings' album Wings Over America and another live version from three days later in Seattle, Washington, was shown in the concert film Rockshow. An excerpt from the Rockshow performance was also included in the documentary Wings Over the World.

== Lyrics and music ==
Like a number of successful Paul McCartney songs, "Beware My Love" is made of several disparate elements. The song begins with a brief harmonium melody followed by a repeated acoustic guitar figure. (The song's album version has the previous song, "She's My Baby", fading out into the harmonium intro; "Beware"'s single version fades in as the harmonium part fades out into the acoustic guitar riff.) This calm intro provides a contrast with the propulsiveness of main body of the song. Linda McCartney sings the intro and outro movements, with her voice multi-tracked, effectively singing on behalf of Paul McCartney—who sings the lead vocal in the main song. Over the course of the song, Paul McCartney's singing, as well as the music, intensifies. In the main verses, the singer warns the woman he loves to beware because he does not believe that the other man she is seeing is right for her. In the bridges, he tells the woman that although he must leave now, "I'll leave my message in my song." (Author Robert Rodriguez finds this line ironic, since he believes the song apparently has no message. Authors Chip Madinger and Mark Easter assert that the verses and chorus don't seem to have much to do with each other.)

"Beware My Love" is a mid-tempo rock song that John Blaney compared to Wings' "Rock Show" and "Soily" and author Tim Riley compared to the Beatles' "Helter Skelter." It is in the key of D minor, although the harmonium and acoustic guitar sections of the prelude are in C major and A major, respectively. The melody of the bridges is based on a descending tetrachord played on the bass guitar. Rodriguez particularly praises Paul McCartney's bass guitar playing, Joe English's drumming and Linda McCartney's and Denny Laine's backing vocals. The song was recorded in a manner that replicated a live recording set up, with all the players recorded together. McCartney stated that he was looking to achieve "excitement in the backing vocal so it's human; you can hear we're all there."

== Critical reception ==
"Beware My Love" has been praised for being the only true rock song on Wings at the Speed of Sound, an album containing mostly ballads and disco-influenced songs. Blaney described the song as being meant to "dispel accusations that Wings were becoming a group of disco-loving softies." In reviewing the album, Allmusic critic Stephen Thomas Erlewine called "Beware My Love" "the best-written song here that effortlessly moves from sun-drenched harmonies to hard rock." Rock music critic Robert Christgau claimed that on the album, McCartney is "at full strength only on the impassioned 'Beware My Love.'" Billboard said it "is in the "Maybe I'm Amazed" vein and is probably his strongest rocker since that song." Ultimate Classic Rock critic Nick DeRiso felt it was the best song on the album, praising its "remarkably layered complexity." Doug Pringle of The Montreal Gazette called the song "the only unqualified success on the album," noting that "it builds from a gentle acoustic beginning to become the only truly electric song on the album." Frank Rose of The Village Voice called this song and Denny Laine's contribution to the album, "Time to Hide" "great, the kind of production numbers McCartney likes to trot out when he knows he's got a real rocker." Rolling Stone critic Dave Marsh also praised "Beware My Love" and "Time to Hide" as well as "Let 'Em In" as successful examples of McCartney's rock style. Jim Beviglia of Culture Sonar said that while the lyrics don't mean much, "McCartney pushes them across with such screaming conviction that they hit home along with the plentiful instrumental hooks." Rodriguez considered "Beware My Love" to be the only song on Wings at the Speed of Sound to be as good as the best songs from Wings' previous two albums, Band on the Run and Venus and Mars. CD Review magazine described "Beware My Love" as "a fiery rocker." Beatle authors Roy Carr and Tony Tyler used "Beware My Love" as an example of Wings at the Speed of Sound being strong melodically. Ultimate Classic Rock critic Nick DeRiso rated it as the best song on Wings at the Speed of Sound, praising the "remarkably layered complexity." Madinger and Easter also described it as one "of the best songs on the LP."

Rodriguez was even more effusive in his praise of the live version of the song on Wings Over America, which is a minute and half shorter than the studio version, praising Jimmy McCulloch's guitar playing, Laine's piano playing and English's drum rolls. Larry Rohter of The Washington Post described the performance on Wings Over America as "rollicking" and "exciting." Ben Fong-Torres described McCartney's live performance of the song as "reaching back for some of that Little Richard inspiration." Jon Marlowe of Miami News described the performance of "Beware My Love" in Rockshow as "rollicking" and one of the two moments in the film that feels like being at a rock show.

According to DeRiso, as good as the Wings at the Speed of Sound version is, an unreleased version that McCartney recorded with Led Zeppelin drummer John Bonham was even better. This version was eventually released in 2014 as part of the Archive Collection box. The original recording's single edit was featured on The 7" Singles Box in 2022.

== Personnel ==
According to The Paul McCartney Project:

- Paul McCartney – lead and backing vocals, bass, possible acoustic guitar
- Linda McCartney – co-lead and backing vocals, keyboards
- Denny Laine – backing vocals, piano
- Jimmy McCulloch – electric guitar
- Joe English – drums
