= Zoo Gang (song) =

Single by Paul McCartney and Wings
- A-side: "Band on the Run"
- Released: 28 June 1974
- Recorded: 25 April 1973
- Studio: Abbey Road Studios, London
- Genre: Rock
- Length: 2:01
- Label: Apple Records
- Songwriters: Paul McCartney, Linda McCartney
- Producer: Paul McCartney

Paul McCartney and Wings singles chronology
"Jet" (1974)	"Zoo Gang" (1974)	"Walking in the Park with Eloise" (1974)

"Zoo Gang" is an instrumental song composed by Paul and Linda McCartney and performed by Paul McCartney and Wings.

== Release ==
It was recorded on 25 April 1973 and was released on 28 June 1974 as the B-side of the "Band on the Run" single in the United Kingdom. "Zoo Gang" was the theme song to the short-lived television programme The Zoo Gang. It was made by Sir Lew Grade's ATV, who asked Paul McCartney to write the theme. In 1993, "Zoo Gang" was included as a bonus track on the re-issue of the album Venus and Mars on compact disc as part of The Paul McCartney Collection. It was the song's first appearance on an album. It was later released on most editions of the 2010 re-release of Band on the Run.

The Zoo Gang also included incidental music by Ken Thorne, who had provided a similar score for Help!, the Beatles' second film. In the USA, "Band on the Run" was issued with "Nineteen Hundred and Eighty-Five" on the flipside. It was a bigger hit there, topping the Billboard Hot 100.

"Zoo Gang" was also recorded by Jungle Juice, a group of Session Musicians, who released it as a UK single on 25 May 1974.

The 2010 Special Edition of Band on the Run contained two CDs and a DVD. The first CD featured the remastered album, while the second contained bonus audio tracks: "Helen Wheels", "Country Dreamer" and "Zoo Gang", plus six performances from the One Hand Clapping documentary.

== Personnel ==
According to the author Luca Perasi:

- Paul McCartney – electric guitar, bass guitar, percussion, accordion
- Linda McCartney – Moog synthesiser
- Denny Seiwell – drums
