= Nineteen Hundred and Eighty-Five =

Single by Paul McCartney and Wings

from the album Band on the Run
- A-side: "Band on the Run"
- Released: 28 June 1974
- Recorded: October 1973
- Studio: AIR, London
- Genre: Rock
- Length: 5:29
- Label: Apple
- Songwriters: Paul McCartney; Linda McCartney
- Producer: Paul McCartney

Wings singles chronology
| "Jet" (1974) | "Nineteen Hundred and Eighty-Five" (1974) | "Walking in the Park with Eloise" (1974) |

Official audio
- "Nineteen Hundred and Eighty-Five" on YouTube

Band on the Run track listing
- 9 tracks Side one: 1. "Band on the Run"; 2. "Jet"; 3. "Bluebird"; 4. "Mrs. Vandebilt"; 5. "Let Me Roll It"; Side two: 6. "Mamunia"; 7. "No Words"; 8. "Picasso's Last Words (Drink to Me)"; 9. "Nineteen Hundred and Eighty-Five"

"Nineteen Hundred and Eighty-Five" (sometimes written as "1985") is a song by the British–American rock band Paul McCartney and Wings, released as the final track on their 1973 album Band on the Run. It has been featured on the 2001 documentary DVD Wingspan and Paul McCartney and Wings' 1974 TV special One Hand Clapping. A 2016 remix of the song was nominated for a Grammy Award. The song was referenced in Bret Easton Ellis’s novel Glamorama, driving a group of fictional supermodels to extreme terrorist acts.

== Lyrics and music ==
Paul McCartney has said that the song originated with just the first line.

With a lot of songs I do, the first line is it. It's all in the first line, and then you have to go on and write the second line. With 'Eleanor Rigby' I had 'picks up the rice in the church where the wedding has been.' That was the one big line that started me off on it. With this one it was 'No one ever left alive in nineteen hundred and eighty-five.' That's all I had of that song for months. 'No one ever left alive in nineteen hundred and eighty... six?' It wouldn't have worked!

— Paul McCartney, Paul McCartney In His Own Words

The tune is the climactic track from the album Band on the Run. It continues the album's theme of escape by describing the singer achieving artistic freedom through love. Author Andrew Grant Jackson calls the lyrics "gibberish" and mere placeholders for the excitement and "cinematic purpose" of the music.

The song has a grandiose ending with a full orchestra and the band. Other instrumentation includes mellotron, organ and horns. The album version ends with an excerpt of the opening song's chorus.

Ultimate Classic Rock critic Dave Swanson rated the song as McCartney's 8th most underrated song, saying that "A funky groove holds the song together as Paul delivers a gritty bluesy vocal."

== Other releases ==
"Nineteen Hundred and Eighty-Five" has been released on the compilation albums Pure McCartney (2016) and Wings. It was also included on The 7" Singles Box in 2022. A different live studio take, recorded on 29 August 1974 at EMI Studios in London, was first released on the Paul McCartney Archive Collection edition of Band on the Run in 2010, and later on One Hand Clapping in 2024.

== Personnel ==
According to Luca Perasi:

- Paul McCartney – lead and backing vocals, electric guitar, bass guitar, piano, synthesiser, drums
- Linda McCartney – backing vocals, organ
- Denny Laine – backing vocals, electric guitar
- Tony Visconti – orchestrations
- Beaux Arts Orchestra – brass & strings

== Live performances ==
"Nineteen Hundred and Eighty-Five" was never performed live by Wings. McCartney performed the song live for the first time during his 2010–2011 Up and Coming Tour. He played the song live again during his 2011–2012 On the Run Tour, his 2013–2015 Out There Tour, his 2016–2017 One on One Tour, his performance on 26 July 2018 in the Liverpool Cavern Club, his 2018–2019 Freshen Up tour, at 12-12-12: The Concert for Sandy Relief and on his 2022–2025 Got Back tour. On 25 June 2022, a week after his 80th birthday, he performed the song as part of his Saturday night headline act, on the Pyramid stage, at the Glastonbury Festival.

== Cover versions ==
The Golden Dogs included a cover version on their 2006 album Big Eye Little Eye.

In 2016, German producer Timo Maas and Canadian DJ James Teej released a remix of the track with McCartney's approval. Their version received a Grammy nomination for Best Remixed Recording, Non-Classical at the 59th Annual Grammy Awards.

=== Tracklisting ===
Download single

1. "Nineteen Hundred and Eighty-Five" (Radio Edit) – 2:46
2. "Nineteen Hundred and Eighty-Five" – 6:01
3. "Nineteen Hundred and Eighty-Five" (Club Mix) – 5:07

Remix download single

1. "Nineteen Hundred and Eighty-Five" (Kerri Chandler Kaoz 623 Again Vocal Mix) – 7:25
2. "Nineteen Hundred and Eighty-Five" (Paul Woodford Rework) – 10:03
3. "Nineteen Hundred and Eighty-Five" (Tim Green Remix) – 8:49
