= No Words =

Song by Paul McCartney and Wings

from the album Band on the Run
- Released: 7 December 1973
- Recorded: August–November 1973; Lagos, Nigeria
- Genre: Rock
- Length: 2:33
- Label: Apple
- Songwriters: Paul McCartney; Denny Laine
- Producer: Paul McCartney

Band on the Run track listing
- 9 tracks Side one: 1. "Band on the Run"; 2. "Jet"; 3. "Bluebird"; 4. "Mrs. Vandebilt"; 5. "Let Me Roll It"; Side two: 6. "Mamunia"; 7. "No Words"; 8. "Picasso's Last Words (Drink to Me)"; 9. "Nineteen Hundred and Eighty-Five"

"No Words" is a song written by Paul McCartney and Denny Laine, and first released on 7 December 1973 on Band on the Run by Paul McCartney and Wings. The song was Laine's first co-writing on a Wings album and his only writing credit on Band on the Run.

== Background ==
The song was written before the release of Wings' second album, Red Rose Speedway, but not recorded until the Band on the Run sessions. It began with an unfinished melody that Laine wrote and was then completed by the group during the recording sessions.

== Recording ==
The basic track was recorded in Lagos, Nigeria and was later completed in September in England. The orchestral arrangements, consisting of brass instruments and string quartets were made by Tony Visconti. Ian Horne and Trevor Jones, two of Wings' roadies, sang backing vocals on the track although their parts are buried in the mix. Otherwise, the vocals consist primarily of Laine and Paul and Linda McCartney all singing together, with Laine and Paul McCartney each taking a solo spot. The original recording is over four minutes, but was faded early for LP release.

The song's verses are in the key of A major. The key moves to the dominant, E major, for the refrain. The lyrics express the singer's desire for a woman who he fears may not be only interested in him. The refrain consists of the single line "No words for my love." Music author Vincent Benitez interprets the song's ending on a dominant key rather than the tonic as reflecting the singer's uncertain situation. Robert Rodriguez described "No Words" as being the only song on Band on the Run that came close to being the type of "silly love song" that predominated McCartney's albums of the time.

== Reception ==
Ultimate Classic Rock critic Nick DeRiso rated "No Words" as Denny Laine's 6th best song, calling it "an uplifting meditation on wordlessly loving someone".

== Live performances ==
The only time the song was performed live by Wings was in 1979 during their final tour.

== Personnel ==
According to the author Luca Perasi:

- Paul McCartney – lead and backing vocals, electric guitar, bass guitar, drums
- Linda McCartney – backing vocals, Moog synthesiser, electric piano
- Denny Laine – lead and backing vocals, electric guitar
- Ian Horne – backing vocals
- Trevor Jones – backing vocals
- Beaux Arts Orchestra – string quartet
