= One on One (tour) =

2016–17 concert tour by Paul McCartney

- World tour by Paul McCartney
- Location: Asia; Europe; North America; Oceania; South America
- Start date: 13 April 2016
- End date: 16 December 2017
- Legs: 10
- No. of shows: 77
- Box office: $242.6 million

Paul McCartney concert chronology
- Out There (2013–15); One on One (2016–17); 2018 Secret Gigs (2018)

One on One was a concert tour by English musician Paul McCartney that began on 13 April 2016 and traveled through the Americas, Europe, Asia and Oceania, ending on 16 December 2017. The tour marked McCartney's first-ever performances in Fresno, South Dakota, and Arkansas. Prior to the announcement of the tour, McCartney revealed two European festival dates for June 2016 at the Pinkpop Festival and Rock Werchter respectively.

McCartney described the title of the tour as "when I do the show, I feel like I'm kind of talking to someone like me in the audience, even though you're at the back of the hall, we try and bring the intimacy to you. It's me, one-on-one, with every member of the audience". As with his other concert tours as a solo artist, the tour's setlist was composed of songs by his former bands the Beatles and Wings, as well as songs from his solo career.

== Background ==
On 15 February 2016, McCartney announced two initial festival dates in Europe for the upcoming summer. These two headlining performances at Pinkpop Festival in Landgraaf, Netherlands and Rock Werchter in Werchter, Belgium were revealed before the initial revelation of the "One on One" tour. These tours would feature mostly similar elements of the "One on One" performances yet with a condensed set list to allot for festival curfew limits and less stage elements given restrictions. In the wake of the passing of notable Beatles and McCartney producer George Martin, McCartney announced the initial "One on One" dates for North America and Europe. In North America, McCartney's visit to Fresno, California, would mark his first performance in the city, and his performances in North Little Rock and Sioux Falls would be his first performances in the states of Arkansas and South Dakota respectively. Elsewhere in North America, McCartney would perform in Portland after an eleven-year absence following his 2005 'US' tour. The two shows in Vancouver would follow his previous performance in the city at the BC Place stadium in 2012, yet this tour would feature two shows in the neighboring Rogers Arena after the pyrotechnics during his concert at BC Place accidentally damaged the stadium's new roof. McCartney's Seattle show would mark his shortest absence from any North American city on the tour announced currently, as he performed at the city's Safeco Field during the inaugural year of the 'Out There' tour. McCartney announced a performance on 16 March in Minneapolis at the Target Center. This show would take place on 4 May 2016, less than two years after McCartney's last performance in the city at the adjacent baseball stadium sharing a corporate sponsor with the arena, Target Field. Due to high demand of tickets a second show in Minneapolis was announced the next day and would take place on 5 May.

In Europe, McCartney's Düsseldorf concert would be his first in the city since 1972 with his post-Beatles band Wings. The Munich performance would follow a 13-year break from the city, lastly hosting a performance in 2003 during the Back in the World tour. McCartney would visit the Waldbühne amphitheater in Berlin for his first Berlin performance since his Good Evening Europe Tour in 2009. On 14 March 2016, a performance was announced for the city of Madrid to take place on 2 June 2016. This performance at the Estadio Vicente Calderón would mark McCartney's almost twelve years to the date of his last Madrid performance. Each of these European performances, including festivals, would be McCartney's first performance at each specific venue in these cities. In addition to these venues, McCartney would return to Paris less than a year following his performance at the city's Stade de France. Announced on 16 March, his performance would take place on 30 May 2016 at the AccorHotels Arena. McCartney last performed at the venue during his 2011 On the Run tour. McCartney announced on 29 March a performance in the city of Prague to take place at the O_{2} Arena on 16 June 2016. This would be his first performance in the Czech Republic since 2004.

The tour marks McCartney's first-ever performance as a solo artist of "A Hard Day's Night" and the first time the song was performed by a Beatle in half a century since the Beatles played it for the last time on 31 August 1965 at the Cow Palace in Daly City, California.

On 30 May 2016 at the AccorHotels Arena in Paris, Paul McCartney performed "Michelle" in between "FourFiveSeconds" and "Eleanor Rigby".

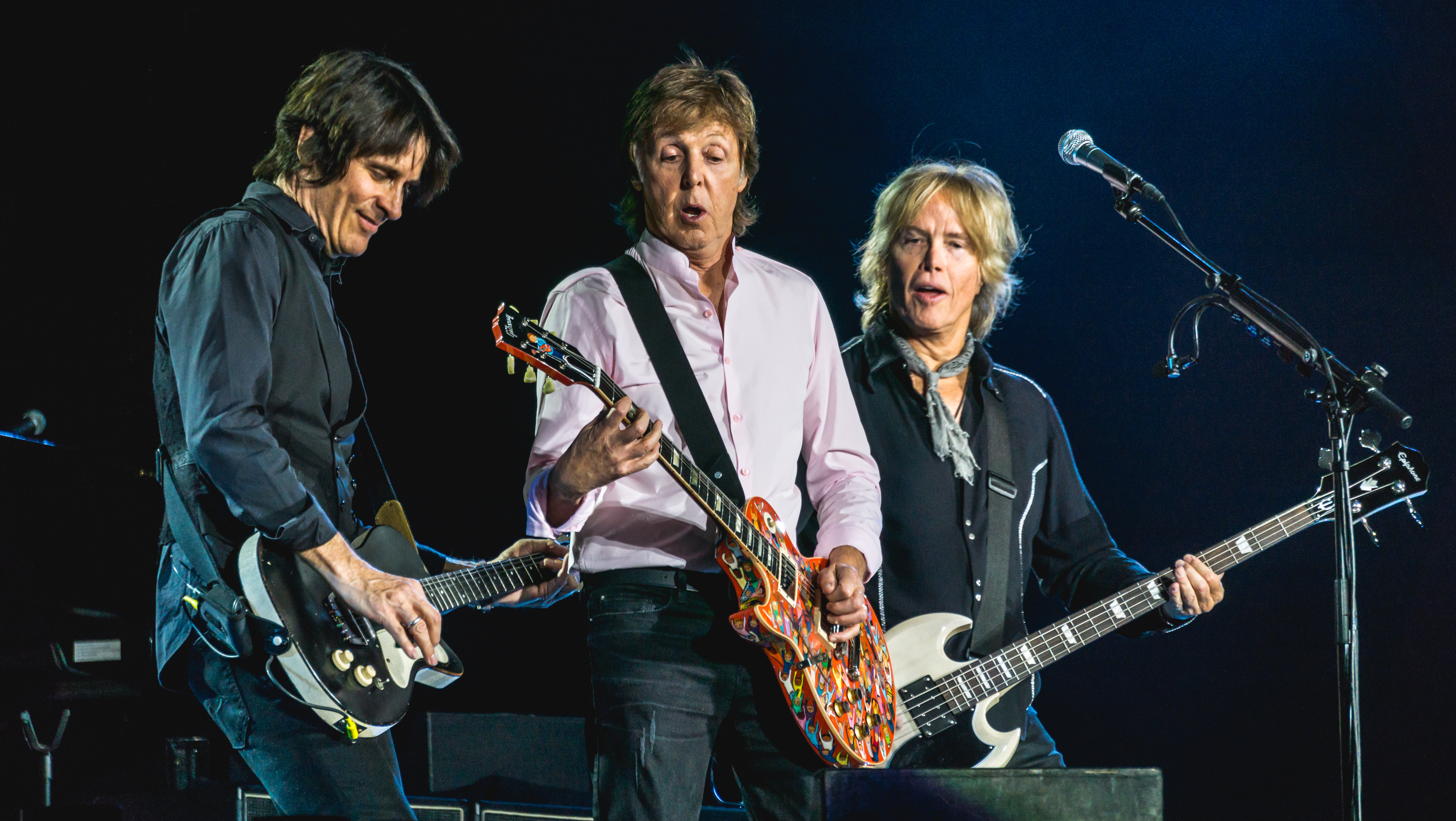
McCartney and his band performing at Desert Trip

On 17 July 2016, Paul played "Helter Skelter" at Fenway Park in Boston as the third song in the encore after "Hi, Hi, Hi" and before "Birthday" and Bob Weir of The Grateful Dead played rhythm guitar and New England Patriots tight end Rob Gronkowski danced on stage to the song. On 19 July 2016, McCartney performed his first ever show in Hershey, Pennsylvania, at Hersheypark Stadium. The town of Hershey declared the date Paul McCartney Day and renamed street signs and rides in Hersheypark in his honor. On 21 July 2016 in Hamilton, Ontario, Canada and on 20 April 2016 in Vancouver, British Columbia, "Mull of Kintyre" was performed as the third song in the encore after "Hi, Hi, Hi". At the latter concert, Jimmy Fallon joined Paul on stage to sing "I Saw Her Standing There" after "Mull of Kintyre". The second Washington, D.C., concert from August 10, held at the Verizon Center, saw a slightly modified set-list, wherein "Letting Go" was replaced with "Jet", and in the encore, they were played as one continuous act, "Hi, Hi, Hi" was replaced by "I Saw Her Standing There." On October 8, for the first Desert Trip show, Paul made numerous set changes. First, "Save Us" was swapped with "Jet", "Temporary Secretary" was replaced by "Day Tripper", "Here, There, and Everywhere" was not played, "You Won't See Me" was swapped with "I've Just Seen A Face", "A Day in the Life", "Give Peace A Chance", and for the first time ever live, "Why Don't We Do It In The Road?" were played with Neil Young for the latter three. In the encore "I Wanna Be Your Man" replaced "Hi, Hi, Hi", and "Helter Skelter" replaced "Birthday." For the following weekend, the set was the same, except for "I Wanna Be Your Man" being swapped for "Birthday", and "Can't Buy Me Love" being replaced by "Got to Get You Into My Life." Rihanna joined the band for "FourFiveSeconds." This was the last show of the year.

The tour resumed in April 2017 with the Japan shows, revisiting the Budokan like in 2015. Before and after, Paul announced another 2 US legs; a Latin American leg, returning to Brazil after 3 years and Mexico after a 5 1/2 years absence; and the first visit to Australia and New Zealand in 24 years, having last visited those countries in 1993 on the New World Tour. This year has seen a couple of changes in the set list, which are "Save Us" and "Letting Go" switching with "Junior's Farm" and "Jet" respectively concert after concert, "Here, There, and Everywhere" dropped out, and "I Wanna Be Your Man" and "Sgt. Pepper's (reprise)" added, with the former added after being successfully performed at the Desert Trip, and the latter reappearing since the Up and Coming Tour, 6 years after the last performance on the last show of that tour in Las Vegas, but now, though it's been inserted in the encore like before, it's not the culminating number of the show and is not attached in a medley with The End.

Since the Newark concerts, there's another change in the set list: "The Fool on the Hill" is gone, and "A Day in the Life/Give Peace a Chance" replaces it, returning since the Desert Trip shows, and after being absent since On the Run.

== Personnel ==
Rusty Anderson (Backing vocals, electric guitar, acoustic guitar)	Paul McCartney (Lead vocals, bass, acoustic guitar, piano, electric guitar, ukulele)	Brian Ray (Backing vocals, electric guitar, acoustic guitar, bass)
Paul Wickens (Backing vocals, keyboards, electric guitar, acoustic guitar, bongos, percussion, harmonica, accordion)	Paul McCartney (Lead vocals, bass, acoustic guitar, piano, electric guitar, ukulele)	Abe Laboriel, Jr. (Backing vocals, drums, percussion)

== Tour dates ==
List of 2016 concerts
Date	City	Country	Venue	Attendance	Box Office
13 April	Fresno	United States	Save Mart Center	11,976 / 11,976	$2,443,733
15 April	Portland	United States	Moda Center	15,774 / 15,774	—
17 April	Seattle	United States	KeyArena	13,253 / 13,253	—
19 April	Vancouver	Canada	Rogers Arena	32,424 / 32,424	—
20 April	Vancouver	Canada	Rogers Arena	32,424 / 32,424	—
30 April	North Little Rock	United States	Verizon Arena	15,317 / 15,317	$2,278,118
2 May	Sioux Falls	United States	Denny Sanford Premier Center	10,746 / 10,746	$2,040,216
4 May	Minneapolis	United States	Target Center	28,048 / 28,048	$3,671,696
5 May	Minneapolis	United States	Target Center	28,048 / 28,048	$3,671,696
15 May	Córdoba	Argentina	Estadio Mario Alberto Kempes	40,017 / 49,613	$4,303,620
17 May	La Plata	Argentina	Estadio Ciudad de La Plata	97,721 / 100,024	$11,809,700
19 May	La Plata	Argentina	Estadio Ciudad de La Plata	97,721 / 100,024	$11,809,700
28 May	Düsseldorf	Germany	Esprit Arena	—	—
30 May	Paris	France	AccorHotels Arena	—	—
2 June	Madrid	Spain	Estadio Vicente Calderón	—	—
10 June	Munich	Germany	Olympiastadion	—	—
12 June (Note: The 12 June 2016 concert in Landgraaf was part of Pinkpop Festival.)	Landgraaf	Netherlands	Megaland Landgraaf	—	—
14 June	Berlin	Germany	Waldbühne	—	—
16 June	Prague	Czech Republic	O_{2} Arena	17,881 / 17,881	—
24 June	Bergen	Norway	Bergenhus Festning	22,500 / 22,500	—
27 June	Herning	Denmark	Jyske Bank Boxen	—	—
30 June (Note: The 30 June 2016 concert in Werchter was part of Rock Werchter.)	Werchter	Belgium	Werchter Festival Grounds	—	—
8 July (Note: The 8 July 2016 concert in Milwaukee was part of Summerfest.)	Milwaukee	United States	Marcus Amphitheater	—	—
10 July	Cincinnati	United States	U.S. Bank Arena	13,588 / 13,588	$2,097,022
12 July	Philadelphia	United States	Citizens Bank Park	38,431 / 40,615	$4,365,986
17 July	Boston	United States	Fenway Park	36,142 / 37,065	$4,981,074
19 July	Hershey	United States	Hersheypark Stadium	29,665 / 31,297	$3,519,465
21 July	Hamilton	Canada	FirstOntario Centre	14,258 / 14,375	$2,259,660
7 August	East Rutherford	United States	MetLife Stadium	52,465 / 52,465	$7,808,072
9 August	Washington, D.C.	United States	Verizon Center	27,288 / 27,288	$4,270,782
10 August	Washington, D.C.	United States	Verizon Center	27,288 / 27,288	$4,270,782
13 August	St. Louis	United States	Busch Stadium	43,428 / 43,428	$4,657,982
15 August	Grand Rapids	United States	Van Andel Arena	11,280 / 11,280	$1,883,984
17 August	Cleveland	United States	Quicken Loans Arena	31,869 / 35,968	$4,362,515
18 August	Cleveland	United States	Quicken Loans Arena	31,869 / 35,968	$4,362,515
4 October	Sacramento	United States	Golden 1 Center	30,000 / 30,000	—
5 October	Sacramento	United States	Golden 1 Center	30,000 / 30,000	—
8 October (Note: The October 7 and 14, 2016 concerts at the Empire Polo Club in Indio, California, were part of Desert Trip.)	Indio	United States	Empire Polo Club	—	—
13 October (Note: The Pioneertown show on 13 October 2016 was a (300 people) sold out (one-hour and 40-minute) surprise concert.)	Pioneertown	United States	Pappy & Harriet's Pioneertown Palace	—	—
14 October	Indio	United States	Empire Polo Club	—	—

List of 2017 concerts
Date	City	Country	Venue	Attendance	Box Office
25 April	Tokyo	Japan	Nippon Budokan	11,296 / 11,296	$5,488,025
27 April	Tokyo	Japan	Tokyo Dome	143,826 / 143,826	$22,802,345
29 April	Tokyo	Japan	Tokyo Dome	143,826 / 143,826	$22,802,345
30 April	Tokyo	Japan	Tokyo Dome	143,826 / 143,826	$22,802,345
7 July	Miami	United States	American Airlines Arena	14,149 / 14,149	$2,030,364
10 July	Tampa	United States	Amalie Arena	14,758 / 14,758	$2,127,892
13 July	Duluth	United States	Infinite Energy Arena	10,992 / 10,992	$2,320,697
15 July	Bossier City	United States	CenturyLink Center	13,037 / 13,037	$2,257,824
17 July	Oklahoma City	United States	Chesapeake Energy Arena	12,812 / 12,812	$1,998,990
19 July	Wichita	United States	Intrust Bank Arena	12,053 / 12,053	$2,091,964
21 July	Des Moines	United States	Wells Fargo Arena	13,549 / 13,549	$2,169,980
23 July	Omaha	United States	CenturyLink Center Omaha	14,535 / 14,535	$2,213,443
25 July	Tinley Park	United States	Hollywood Casino Amphitheatre	46,040 / 46,040	$3,977,821
26 July	Tinley Park	United States	Hollywood Casino Amphitheatre	46,040 / 46,040	$3,977,821
11 September	Newark	United States	Prudential Center	28,166 / 28,166	$4,944,591
12 September	Newark	United States	Prudential Center	28,166 / 28,166	$4,944,591
15 September	New York City	United States	Madison Square Garden	30,213 / 30,213	$6,448,272
17 September	New York City	United States	Madison Square Garden	30,213 / 30,213	$6,448,272
19 September (Note: Labeled as Brooklyn in promotional material.)	New York City	United States	Barclays Center	30,002 / 30,002	$4,392,370
21 September	New York City	United States	Barclays Center	30,002 / 30,002	$4,392,370
23 September	Syracuse	United States	Carrier Dome	36,200 / 36,200	$3,820,130
26 September	Uniondale	United States	Nassau Coliseum	24,723 / 24,723	$4,233,509
27 September	Uniondale	United States	Nassau Coliseum	24,723 / 24,723	$4,233,509
1 October	Detroit	United States	Little Caesars Arena	30,166 / 30,166	$4,525,832
2 October	Detroit	United States	Little Caesars Arena	30,166 / 30,166	$4,525,832
13 October	Porto Alegre	Brazil	Estádio Beira-Rio	45,774 / 46,989	$6,054,860
15 October	São Paulo	Brazil	Allianz Parque	46,070 / 46,657	$5,613,520
17 October	Belo Horizonte	Brazil	Estádio Mineirão	41,374 / 49,025	$4,241,190
20 October	Salvador	Brazil	Itaipava Arena Fonte Nova	49,868 / 57,918	$4,923,040
28 October	Mexico City	Mexico	Estadio Azteca	48,026 / 48,026	$6,234,337
2 December	Perth	Australia	nib Stadium	22,435 / 22,435	$3,441,983
5 December	Melbourne	Australia	AAMI Park	59,002 / 59,002	$9,623,682
6 December	Melbourne	Australia	AAMI Park	59,002 / 59,002	$9,623,682
9 December	Brisbane	Australia	Suncorp Stadium	40,671 / 40,671	$5,829,409
11 December	Sydney	Australia	Qudos Bank Arena	29,087 / 29,087	$6,035,330
12 December	Sydney	Australia	Qudos Bank Arena	29,087 / 29,087	$6,035,330
16 December	Auckland	New Zealand	Mount Smart Stadium	34,901 / 34,901	$3,644,504
Total				1,405,964 / 1,444,321 (97%)	$200,811,769

== Set list ==
=== Typical set list ===
1. "A Hard Day's Night"
2. "Save Us" or "Junior's Farm"
3. "Can't Buy Me Love"
4. "Letting Go" or "Jet"
5. "Temporary Secretary" or "All My Loving" or "Drive My Car"
6. "Let Me Roll It"
7. "I've Got a Feeling"
8. "My Valentine"
9. "Nineteen Hundred and Eighty-Five"
10. "Here, There and Everywhere" (only in 2016)
11. "Maybe I'm Amazed"
12. "We Can Work It Out" or "I've Just Seen a Face"
13. "In Spite of All the Danger"
14. "You Won't See Me"
15. "Love Me Do"
16. "And I Love Her"
17. "Blackbird"
18. "Here Today"
19. "Queenie Eye"
20. "New"
21. "The Fool on the Hill" (until the Tinley Park shows)
22. "Lady Madonna"
23. "FourFiveSeconds"
24. "Eleanor Rigby"
25. "I Wanna Be Your Man" (only in 2017)
26. "Being for the Benefit of Mr. Kite!"
27. "Something"
28. "A Day in the Life"/"Give Peace a Chance" (since the Newark shows)
29. "Ob-La-Di, Ob-La-Da"
30. "Band on the Run"
31. "Back in the U.S.S.R."
32. "Let It Be"
33. "Live and Let Die"
34. "Hey Jude"
  - Encore
35. "Yesterday"
36. "Sgt. Pepper's Lonely Hearts Club Band (Reprise)" (only in 2017)
37. "Hi, Hi, Hi" or "Get Back", or "Mull of Kintyre" (only in Australia, New Zealand and Canada)
38. "Birthday" or "I Saw Her Standing There" or "Helter Skelter"
39. "Golden Slumbers"/"Carry That Weight"/"The End"

=== Other set lists ===
Pinkpop Festival
1. "A Hard Day's Night"
2. "Save Us"
3. "Can't Buy Me Love"
4. "Letting Go"
5. "Let Me Roll It"
6. "I've Got a Feeling"
7. "My Valentine"
8. "Nineteen Hundred and Eighty-Five"
9. "Maybe I'm Amazed"
10. "We Can Work It Out"
11. "In Spite of All the Danger"
12. "Love Me Do"
13. "Blackbird"
14. "Give Peace a Chance"
15. "Here Today"
16. "New"
17. "Lady Madonna"
18. "FourFiveSeconds"
19. "Eleanor Rigby"
20. "Being for the Benefit of Mr. Kite!"
21. "Ram On"
22. "Something"
23. "Ob-La-Di, Ob-La-Da"
24. "Band on the Run"
25. "Back in the U.S.S.R."
26. "Let It Be"
27. "Live and Let Die"
28. "Hey Jude"
  - Encore
29. "Hi, Hi, Hi"
30. "Birthday"
31. "Golden Slumbers"/"Carry That Weight"/"The End"
Rock Werchter
1. "A Hard Day's Night"
2. "Save Us"
3. "Can't Buy Me Love"
4. "Letting Go"
5. "Let Me Roll It"
6. "I've Got a Feeling"
7. "My Valentine"
8. "Nineteen Hundred and Eighty-Five"
9. "Maybe I'm Amazed"
10. "We Can Work It Out"
11. "In Spite of All the Danger"
12. "Love Me Do"
13. "Blackbird"
14. "Here Today"
15. "New"
16. "Lady Madonna"
17. "FourFiveSeconds"
18. "Eleanor Rigby"
19. "Being for the Benefit of Mr. Kite!"
20. "Something"
21. "Ob-La-Di, Ob-La-Da"
22. "Band on the Run"
23. "Back in the U.S.S.R."
24. "Let It Be"
25. "Live and Let Die"
26. "Hey Jude"
  - Encore
27. "Hi, Hi, Hi"
28. "Birthday"
29. "Golden Slumbers"/"Carry That Weight"/"The End"
Desert Trip 1
1. "A Hard Day's Night"
2. "Jet"
3. "Can't Buy Me Love"
4. "Letting Go"
5. "Day Tripper"
6. "Let Me Roll It"
7. "I've Got a Feeling"
8. "My Valentine"
9. "Nineteen Hundred and Eighty-Five"
10. "Maybe I'm Amazed"
11. "We Can Work It Out"
12. "In Spite of All the Danger"
13. "I've Just Seen a Face"
14. "Love Me Do"
15. "And I Love Her"
16. "Blackbird"
17. "Here Today"
18. "Queenie Eye"
19. "Lady Madonna"
20. "FourFiveSeconds"
21. "Eleanor Rigby"
22. "Being for the Benefit of Mr. Kite!"
23. "A Day in the Life"/"Give Peace a Chance" (with Neil Young)
24. "Why Don't We Do It in the Road?" (with Neil Young)
25. "Something"
26. "Ob-La-Di, Ob-La-Da"
27. "Band on the Run"
28. "Back in the U.S.S.R."
29. "Let It Be"
30. "Live and Let Die"
31. "Hey Jude"
  - Encore
32. "I Wanna Be Your Man"
33. "Helter Skelter"
34. "Golden Slumbers"/"Carry That Weight"/"The End"
Pappy & Harriet's Pioneertown Palace
1. "Save Us"
2. "A Hard Day's Night"
3. "Junior's Farm"
4. "Can't Buy Me Love"
5. "Let Me Roll It"
6. "I've Got a Feeling"
7. "My Valentine"
8. "Nineteen Hundred and Eighty-Five"
9. "We Can Work It Out"
10. "I've Just Seen a Face"
11. "Love Me Do"
12. "Queenie Eye"
13. "Lady Madonna"
14. "Ob-La-Di, Ob-La-Da"
15. "Letting Go"
16. "Day Tripper"
17. "Band on the Run"
18. "Back in the U.S.S.R."
19. "Hey Jude"
  - Encore
20. "Hi, Hi, Hi"
21. "Birthday"
22. "I Saw Her Standing There"
Desert Trip 2
1. "A Hard Day's Night"
2. "Jet"
3. "Got To Get You Into My Life"
4. "Letting Go"
5. "Day Tripper"
6. "Let Me Roll It"
7. "I've Got a Feeling"
8. "My Valentine"
9. "Nineteen Hundred and Eighty-Five"
10. "Maybe I'm Amazed"
11. "We Can Work It Out"
12. "In Spite of All the Danger"
13. "I've Just Seen a Face"
14. "Love Me Do"
15. "And I Love Her"
16. "Blackbird"
17. "Here Today"
18. "Queenie Eye"
19. "Lady Madonna"
20. "FourFiveSeconds"
21. "Eleanor Rigby"
22. "Being for the Benefit of Mr. Kite!"
23. "A Day in the Life"/"Give Peace a Chance" (with Neil Young)
24. "Why Don't We Do It in the Road?" (with Neil Young)
25. "Something"
26. "Ob-La-Di, Ob-La-Da"
27. "Band on the Run"
28. "Back in the U.S.S.R."
29. "Let It Be"
30. "Live and Let Die"
31. "Hey Jude"
  - Encore
32. "Birthday"
33. "Helter Skelter"
34. "Golden Slumbers"/"Carry That Weight"/"The End"
Nippon Budokan
1. "A Hard Day's Night"
2. "Jet"
3. "Drive My Car"
4. "Junior's Farm"
5. "Let Me Roll It"
6. "I've Got a Feeling"
7. "My Valentine"
8. "Nineteen Hundred and Eighty-Five"
9. "Maybe I'm Amazed"
10. "We Can Work It Out"
11. "Every Night"
12. "In Spite of All the Danger"
13. "Love Me Do"
14. "Blackbird"
15. "Here Today"
16. "Queenie Eye"
17. "Lady Madonna"
18. "I Wanna Be Your Man"
19. "Magical Mystery Tour"
20. "Being for the Benefit of Mr. Kite!"
21. "Ob-La-Di, Ob-La-Da"
22. "Sgt. Pepper's Lonely Hearts Club Band (reprise)"
23. "Back in the U.S.S.R."
24. "Let It Be"
25. "Live and Let Die"
26. "Hey Jude"
  - Encore
27. "Yesterday"
28. "Hi, Hi, Hi"
29. "Golden Slumbers"/"Carry That Weight"/"The End"

== See also ==
- List of Paul McCartney concert tours
