= Let Me Roll It =

Single by Paul McCartney and Wings

from the album Band on the Run
- A-side: "Jet"
- Released: 15 February 1974
- Recorded: September–October 1973
- Studio: EMI, Lagos, Nigeria
- Genre: Blues rock
- Length: 4:47
- Label: Apple
- Songwriters: Paul McCartney; Linda McCartney
- Producer: Paul McCartney

Wings singles chronology
"Mrs Vandebilt" (1973)	"Let Me Roll It" (1974)	"Band on the Run" (1974)

Band on the Run track listing
- 9 tracks Side one: 1. "Band on the Run"; 2. "Jet"; 3. "Bluebird"; 4. "Mrs. Vandebilt"; 5. "Let Me Roll It"; Side two: 6. "Mamunia"; 7. "No Words"; 8. "Picasso's Last Words (Drink to Me)"; 9. "Nineteen Hundred and Eighty-Five"

"Let Me Roll It" is a song by the British–American rock band Paul McCartney and Wings, released on their 1973 album Band on the Run. The song was also released as the B-side to "Jet" in early 1974, and has remained a staple of McCartney's live concerts since it was first released.

== Origin ==
The song's title was inspired by a quote from George Harrison's "I'd Have You Anytime", the opening track from All Things Must Pass. According to Ultimate Classic Rock contributor Nick DeRiso, John Lennon incorporated the riff from "Let Me Roll It" into his 1974 song "Beef Jerky". DeRiso rated it as Wings' 7th greatest song.

Rolling Stone's critic Jon Landau saw the song as a pastiche of John Lennon's sound, particularly the riff and the use of tape echo on the vocals. For many years, McCartney denied that he intentionally made the song sound like Lennon's work. He did say the vocal "does sound like John," but that "I hadn't realised I'd sung it like John." In his 2021 book The Lyrics: 1956 to the Present, McCartney said, "John loved this tape echo... it became a signature sound on his solo records. I'm acknowledging that by using it here." He also said that when he first sang the song, he thought, "this is very like a John song."

The song has sometimes been described as an answer or response to Lennon's song "How Do You Sleep?", a stinging attack on McCartney on the 1971 Imagine album. However, Philip Norman's authorized biography Paul McCartney: The Life, recounts that in 1972 – after the release of Imagine and before the release of Band on the Run — McCartney and Lennon met and "agreed that slagging one another off, on albums or through the music press, was stupid and childish." Norman quotes Lennon as saying that Band on the Run was "a great album".

In The Lyrics: 1956 to the Present, McCartney says, "'Let Me Roll It' is a love song at its heart." Specifically, he notes that it is about "how exposed you feel when you offer your heart to... another person." He also states that the start-and-stop riff echoes "the hesitation... of wanting to reach out but being reluctant to be completely open."

== Later releases ==
"Let Me Roll It" was later included on the compilation albums Wingspan: Hits and History (2001), Pure McCartney (2016) and the deluxe edition of Wings (2025). It was also featured on The 7" Singles Box in 2022. A different live studio take, recorded on 28 August 1974 at EMI Studios in London, was first released on the Paul McCartney Archive Collection edition of Band on the Run in 2010, and later on One Hand Clapping in 2024.

== Live performances ==
"Let Me Roll It" was performed regularly by Wings during their Over the World tour. McCartney performed the song again during his New World Tour, and it has been a part of every tour since. He has also included live versions of the song on several live albums, including Wings over America, Paul Is Live, Back in the U.S. (and Back in the World), and Good Evening New York City.

== Personnel ==
According to author Bruce Spizer:

- Paul McCartney – lead vocals, guitar, bass guitar, drums
- Linda McCartney – backing vocals, organ
- Denny Laine – backing vocals, guitar
