= Up and Coming Tour =

2010–11 concert tour by Paul McCartney

- Transcontinental tour by Paul McCartney
- Online tour advertisement
- Location: Europe • North America • South America
- Start date: 28 March 2010
- End date: 10 June 2011
- Legs: 7
- No. of shows: 39

Paul McCartney concert chronology
- Good Evening Europe Tour (2009); Up and Coming Tour (2010–11); On the Run (2011–12)

The Up and Coming Tour was a concert tour by Paul McCartney. The tour began on 28 March 2010, at the Jobing.com Arena in Glendale, Arizona, northwest of Downtown Phoenix. As with McCartney's other concert tours as a solo artist, the setlist for the Up and Coming Tour was composed of songs by his former bands the Beatles and Wings, as well as songs from his solo career. The tour included two concerts at the Hollywood Bowl in Los Angeles, followed by concerts in Miami and San Juan, the latter marking both McCartney's first concert in Puerto Rico and the first visit by a member of the Beatles. The tour ended on 10 June 2011 with a show in Las Vegas, Nevada.

The Up and Coming Tour was performed across venues in North America, Europe, and South America. Tickets for the concert in Buenos Aires, Argentina, were sold out within an hour, and a second concert in the same venue was announced for the following day due to the demand. During the tour, McCartney received the Library of Congress' Gershwin Prize for Popular Song from President Barack Obama.

== Background ==
McCartney announced shows for Europe, including his first appearance at the Isle of Wight Festival, his first Scottish date for 20 years at Hampden Park, Glasgow, his last being at Glasgow SECC Arena on 23 June 1990 and his first show in Cardiff, Wales in over three decades, at the Millennium Stadium. Additional dates are to be announced. On 5 April McCartney announced his first concert in Mexico since 2002. On 17 May McCartney announced a return to the United States in July, visiting Salt Lake City and San Francisco. On 28 May 2010, McCartney announced his first-ever show in Nashville. The Salt Lake City show marked McCartney's first show in Utah, and the San Francisco show marked his first performance in the city since The Beatles performed at Candlestick Park in 1966. On 3 June 2010, McCartney announced he would be opening the Consol Energy Center in Pittsburgh with a show on 18 August 2010. He also announced other cities, including Denver, Kansas City, Toronto, Montreal and Philadelphia as part of the tour's upcoming return to North America. On 7 June 2010, McCartney announced his first show in Charlotte, North Carolina since his mammoth New World Tour in 1993. It was McCartney's first show in North Carolina since his Back in the U.S. Tour in 2002. On 14 June 2010, McCartney announced second dates for Toronto and Pittsburgh, due to popular demand in both cities, and the fact that the shows sold out in minutes. McCartney's 14 August 2010 show at the Wachovia Center sold out in two minutes, and another show was added for 15 August. In November 2010, McCartney returned to Argentina and Brazil for the first time in 17 years since the New World Tour with two sold out shows in São Paulo that attracted over 140,000 fans. McCartney returned to South America in 2011 for another 4 concerts, Peru, Chile and two in Rio de Janeiro, Brazil. The tour ended on 10 June with a show in Las Vegas.

== The O2 rehearsals ==
Three months after ending his Good Evening Europe Tour at The O2, McCartney used the arena to stage full rehearsals. He had previously hired the venue to rehearse for his '04 Summer Tour.

Talking about performing in London, McCartney said, "My last show of 2009 was in London at The O2 and we had a great night, there was a great party atmosphere. I hope that this summer we can have an even bigger party in Hyde Park. I've had a little taste of performing in the park when I guested briefly with Neil Young there last summer and it tasted good. So I'm looking forward to getting there with the band and performing our own show."

== Technical specifications ==
The tour required 31 trucks to transport all its equipment and employed a full-time crew of over 150 people to make it all work. The total weight of all the tour's equipment was 125,000 pounds (57,000 kg). The indoor concerts on the tour used 90 speakers, and the outdoor stadium shows used 130. Backstage at each show there were 14 touring offices and dressing rooms. The catering department served approximately 480 vegetarian meals a day to the crew.

== Web chat ==
Paul McCartney made his second webchat with fans on 20 May 2010 (his first being in 1997, setting a World Record). He spoke from his Sussex studio during the chat. He announced the winners of a competition run by his website, and said that the tour would most likely visit Brazil, Peru, Chile, and Argentina. He also praised his confidence with his band members during the tour.

== Gershwin Prize ==
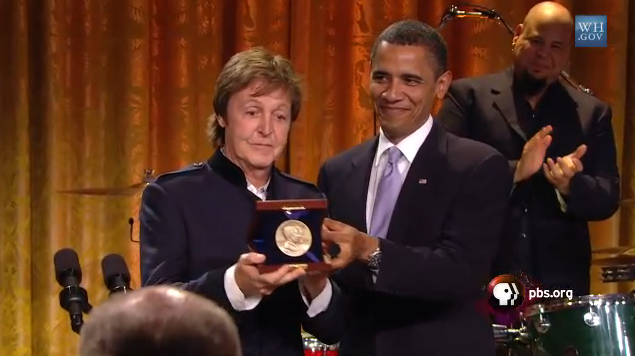
Paul McCartney receiving the Gershwin Prize from President Obama

McCartney received the Library of Congress' Gershwin Prize for Popular Song from President Barack Obama on 2 June 2010. McCartney is the third winner of the Gershwin prize, which is the most prestigious American award for popular music.

After collecting the award, McCartney performed at a star-studded concert inside the White House, playing songs such as "Eleanor Rigby", "Let It Be" and "Michelle" in tribute to the US First Lady, Michelle Obama. Stevie Wonder joined him on stage to perform a duet of "Ebony and Ivory" before McCartney ended the concert with "Hey Jude".

Also performing were Faith Hill, Emmylou Harris, Jack White, Dave Grohl, Lang Lang, Jonas Brothers, Herbie Hancock, Corinne Bailey Rae and Elvis Costello.

== Reception ==
=== In the United States ===
Reception towards the Up and Coming Tour in the United States was generally positive.

In Phoenix: The Arizona Republic stated the following: "With apologies to Ringo Starr, The Beatles legacy couldn’t have hoped to be in better hands at this late date than Paul McCartney's."

In Los Angeles, McCartney said, "The first time we came here we were little kids", told the sold-out Bowl throng, recalling how big it seemed."

In Miami: "There was a little of everything: Good potential for a contact high. Beatles Rock Band images on the big video screen. AARP members storming the barricades just like in the '60s – only with digital cameras, not protest signs. A ukulele-powered version of "Something".

=== In South America ===
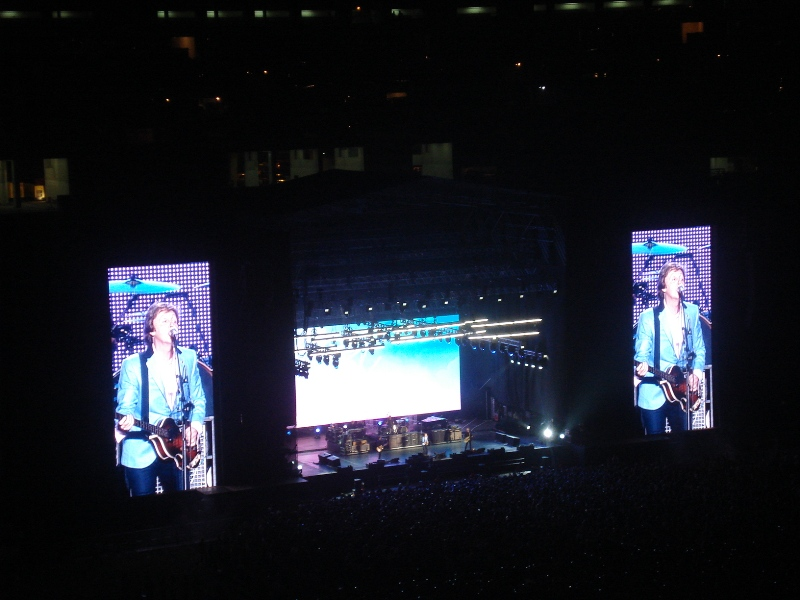
Paul McCartney performing at Estadio Monumental in Lima, Peru (Up and Coming Tour, 9 May 2011)

In Buenos Aires, the online presale began on 10 October by CrowdSurge, two days later by Ticketek (only for BBVA Banco Francés customers). The presale began at 10 am, but 4 minutes later the system crashed. The 25,000 tickets enabled for the Ticketek presale sold out within hours, along with the general public sale. On 14 October ticketek announced a new concert for Thursday 11 November; this show was added due to overwhelming demand. The pre-sale (again only for BBVA Banco Francé customers) began 15 and the regular tickets on 19. Both concerts sold out in a few hours. The first concert sold out in 1 hour, and the second one in nine hours.

Rede Globo, Brazil's television network, broadcast one hour of "best moments" of the first São Paulo concert on 21 November. Both São Paulo tickets were sold out in less than 10 hours, with over 128,000 sold.

== Personnel ==
Rusty Anderson (Backing vocals, electric guitar, Acoustic guitar)	Paul McCartney (Lead vocals, bass, acoustic guitar, piano, electric guitar, ukulele, mandolin)	Brian Ray (Backing vocals, electric guitar, acoustic guitar, bass)
Paul Wickens (Backing vocals, keyboards, electric guitar, percussion, harmonica, accordion)	Paul McCartney (Lead vocals, bass, acoustic guitar, piano, electric guitar, ukulele, mandolin)	Abe Laboriel Jr. (Backing vocals, drums, percussion)

== Tour dates ==
Date	City	Country	Venue	Attendance	Revenue
North America
28 March 2010	Glendale	United States	Jobing.com Arena	14,011 / 14,011	$2,195,245
30 March 2010	Los Angeles	United States	Hollywood Bowl	33,916 / 33,916	$5,351,425
31 March 2010	Los Angeles	United States	Hollywood Bowl	33,916 / 33,916	$5,351,425
3 April 2010	Miami	United States	Sun Life Stadium	35,784 / 35,784	$4,325,859
5 April 2010	San Juan	Puerto Rico	José Miguel Agrelot Coliseum	—N/a	—N/a
27 May 2010	Mexico City	Mexico	Foro Sol	110,000 / 110,000	—N/a
28 May 2010	Mexico City	Mexico	Foro Sol	110,000 / 110,000	—N/a
Europe
12 June 2010	Dublin	Ireland	RDS Arena	—N/a	—N/a
13 June 2010	Newport	England	Seaclose Park	Isle of Wight Festival	
20 June 2010	Glasgow	Scotland	Hampden Park	—N/a	—N/a
26 June 2010	Cardiff	Wales	Principality Stadium	—N/a	—N/a
27 June 2010	London	England	Hyde Park	Hard Rock Calling	
North America
7 July 2010	New York City	United States	Radio City Music Hall	—N/a	—N/a
10 July 2010	San Francisco	United States	AT&T Park	40,512 / 40,512	$4,752,027
13 July 2010	Salt Lake City	United States	Rio Tinto Stadium	25,414 / 25,414	$3,193,716
15 July 2010	Denver	United States	Pepsi Center	14,465 / 14,465	$1,659,665
24 July 2010	Kansas City	United States	Sprint Center	14,258 / 14,258	$2,390,999
26 July 2010	Nashville	United States	Bridgestone Arena	15,162 / 15,162	$2,531,826
28 July 2010	Charlotte	United States	Time Warner Cable Arena	15,477 / 15,477	$2,258,335
8 August 2010	Toronto	Canada	Air Canada Centre	33,650 / 33,650	$5,206,342
9 August 2010	Toronto	Canada	Air Canada Centre	33,650 / 33,650	$5,206,342
12 August 2010	Montreal	Canada	Bell Centre	16,993 / 16,993	$2,494,880
14 August 2010	Philadelphia	United States	Wachovia Center	31,825 / 31,825	$4,885,207
15 August 2010	Philadelphia	United States	Wachovia Center	31,825 / 31,825	$4,885,207
18 August 2010	Pittsburgh	United States	Consol Energy Center	29,745 / 29,745	$4,804,207
19 August 2010	Pittsburgh	United States	Consol Energy Center	29,745 / 29,745	$4,804,207
South America
7 November 2010	Porto Alegre	Brazil	Estádio Beira-Rio	—N/a	—N/a
10 November 2010	Buenos Aires	Argentina	River Plate Stadium	91,262 / 91,262	$11,334,522
11 November 2010	Buenos Aires	Argentina	River Plate Stadium	91,262 / 91,262	$11,334,522
21 November 2010	São Paulo	Brazil	Estádio do Morumbi	—N/a	—N/a
22 November 2010	São Paulo	Brazil	Estádio do Morumbi	—N/a	—N/a
North America
13 December 2010^{[F]}	New York City	United States	Apollo Theater	—N/a	—N/a
Europe
18 December 2010	London	England	Hammersmith Apollo	—N/a	—N/a
20 December 2010	Liverpool	England	O2 Academy Liverpool	—N/a	—N/a
South America
9 May 2011	Lima	Peru	Estadio Monumental "U"	—N/a	—N/a
11 May 2011	Santiago	Chile	Estadio Nacional Julio Martínez Prádanos	—N/a	—N/a
22 May 2011	Rio de Janeiro	Brazil	Estádio Olímpico João Havelange	—N/a	—N/a
23 May 2011	Rio de Janeiro	Brazil	Estádio Olímpico João Havelange	—N/a	—N/a
North America
10 June 2011	Las Vegas	United States	MGM Grand Garden Arena	—N/a	—N/a

Festivals and other miscellaneous performances

^{A} This concert was a part of "Gershwin Prize for Popular Song"
^{B} This concert was a part of "Isle of Wight Festival"
^{C} This concert was a part of "Hard Rock Calling"
^{D} This concert was a part of "The Old Vic 192"
^{E} This concert was a part of "Ringo Starr's 70th Birthday"
^{F} This concert was a "Live From the Apollo Theater (Sirius XM Invitation Concert) private event and not a tour date"

== Setlist ==
Jobing.com Arena
1. "Venus and Mars/Rock Show"
2. "Jet"
3. "All My Loving"
4. "Got to Get You into My Life"
5. "Highway"
6. "Let Me Roll It" (with "Foxy Lady" coda)
7. "The Long and Winding Road"
8. "Nineteen Hundred and Eighty-Five"
9. "(I Want to) Come Home"
10. "My Love"
11. "I'm Looking Through You"
12. "Every Night"
13. "Two of Us"
14. "Blackbird"
15. "Here Today"
16. "Dance Tonight"
17. "Mrs Vandebilt"
18. "Eleanor Rigby"
19. "Something"
20. "Letting Go"
21. "Sing the Changes"
22. "Band on the Run"
23. "Ob-La-Di, Ob-La-Da"
24. "Back in the U.S.S.R."
25. "I've Got a Feeling"
26. "Paperback Writer"
27. "A Day in the Life"/"Give Peace a Chance"
28. "Let It Be"
29. "Live and Let Die"
30. "Hey Jude"
  - Encore 1
31. "Day Tripper"
32. "Lady Madonna"
33. "Get Back"
  - Encore 2
34. "Yesterday"
35. "Helter Skelter"
36. "Sgt. Pepper's Lonely Hearts Club Band (Reprise)"/"The End"
Hollywood Bowl I
1. "Venus and Mars/Rock Show"
2. "Jet"
3. "All My Loving"
4. "Letting Go"
5. "Got to Get You Into My Life"
6. "Highway"
7. "Let Me Roll It" (with "Foxy Lady" coda)
8. "The Long and Winding Road"
9. "Nineteen Hundred and Eighty-Five"
10. "(I Want to) Come Home"
11. "My Love"
12. "I'm Looking Through You"
13. "Two of Us"
14. "Blackbird"
15. "Here Today"
16. "Dance Tonight"
17. "Mrs Vandebilt"
18. "Eleanor Rigby"
19. "Something"
20. "Sing the Changes"
21. "Band on the Run"
22. "Ob-La-Di, Ob-La-Da"
23. "Back in the U.S.S.R."
24. "I've Got a Feeling"
25. "Paperback Writer"
26. "A Day in the Life"/"Give Peace a Chance"
27. "Let It Be"
28. "Live and Let Die"
29. "Hey Jude"
  - Encore 1
30. "Day Tripper"
31. "Lady Madonna"
32. "Get Back"
  - Encore 2
33. "Yesterday"
34. "Helter Skelter"
35. "Sgt. Pepper's Lonely Hearts Club Band (Reprise)"/"The End"
Hollywood Bowl II, Coliseo de Puerto Rico, Foro Sol II, Hampden Park, Rio Tinto Stadium, Sprint Center, Time Warner Cable Arena, Air Canada Centre I, Bell Centre, Wachovia Center II, Consol Energy Center II, Beira Rio Stadium and Morumbi Stadium I
1. "Venus and Mars/Rock Show"
2. "Jet"
3. "All My Loving"
4. "Letting Go"
5. "Drive My Car"
6. "Highway"
7. "Let Me Roll It" (with "Foxy Lady" coda)
8. "The Long and Winding Road"
9. "Nineteen Hundred and Eighty-Five"
10. "Let 'Em In"
11. "My Love"
12. "I've Just Seen a Face"
13. "And I Love Her"
14. "Blackbird"
15. "Here Today"
16. "Dance Tonight"
17. "Michelle" (only in Bell Centre)
18. "Mrs Vandebilt"
19. "Eleanor Rigby"
20. "Ram On" (only in Time Warner Cable Arena)
21. "Something"
22. "Sing the Changes"
23. "Band on the Run"
24. "Ob-La-Di, Ob-La-Da"
25. "Back in the U.S.S.R."
26. "I've Got a Feeling"
27. "Paperback Writer"
28. "A Day in the Life"/"Give Peace a Chance"
29. "Let It Be"
30. "Live and Let Die"
31. "Hey Jude"
  - Encore 1
32. "Day Tripper"
33. "Lady Madonna"
34. "Get Back"
  - Encore 2
35. "Yesterday"
36. "Mull of Kintyre" (with Pipe Band) (only in Hampden Park and Air Canada Centre)
37. "Helter Skelter"
38. "Sgt. Pepper's Lonely Hearts Club Band (Reprise)"/"The End"
Sun Life Stadium, Foro Sol I, RDS Arena, Millennium Stadium, Hyde Park, AT&T Park, Pepsi Center, Bridgestone Arena, Air Canada Centre II, Wachovia Center I, Consol Energy Center I and River Plate Stadium I
1. "Venus and Mars/Rock Show"
2. "Jet"
3. "All My Loving"
4. "Letting Go"
5. "Got to Get You into My Life"
6. "Highway"
7. "Let Me Roll It" (with "Foxy Lady" coda)
8. "The Long and Winding Road"
9. "Nineteen Hundred and Eighty-Five"
10. "Let 'Em In"
11. "My Love"
12. "I'm Looking Through You"
13. "Two of Us"
14. "Tequila" (only in Bridgestone Arena)
15. "Blackbird"
16. "Here Today"
17. "Dance Tonight"
18. "Mrs Vandebilt"
19. "San Francisco Bay Blues" (only at AT&T Park)
20. "Eleanor Rigby"
21. "Something"
22. "Ram On" (only in Millennium Stadium, Hyde Park, Bridgestone Arena and Wachovia Center)
23. "Sing the Changes"
24. "Band on the Run"
25. "Ob-La-Di, Ob-La-Da"
26. "Back in the U.S.S.R."
27. "I've Got a Feeling"
28. "Paperback Writer"
29. "A Day in the Life"/"Give Peace a Chance"
30. "Let It Be"
31. "Live and Let Die"
32. "Hey Jude"
  - Encore 1
33. "Day Tripper"
34. "Lady Madonna"
35. "Get Back"
  - Encore 2
36. "Yesterday"
37. "Mull of Kintyre" (with Pipe Band) (only in Air Canada Centre)
38. "Helter Skelter"
39. "Sgt. Pepper's Lonely Hearts Club Band (Reprise)"/"The End"
Isle of Wight
1. "Venus and Mars/Rock Show"
2. "Jet"
3. "All My Loving"
4. "Letting Go"
5. "Let Me Roll It" (with "Foxy Lady" coda)
6. "The Long and Winding Road"
7. "Nineteen Hundred and Eighty-Five"
8. "I'm Looking Through You"
9. "Blackbird"
10. "Here Today"
11. "Dance Tonight"
12. "Mrs Vandebilt"
13. "Eleanor Rigby"
14. "Something"
15. "Sing the Changes"
16. "Band on the Run"
17. "Ob-La-Di, Ob-La-Da"
18. "Back in the U.S.S.R."
19. "Paperback Writer"
20. "Let It Be"
21. "Live and Let Die"
22. "Hey Jude"
  - Encore
23. "Day Tripper"
24. "Get Back"
25. "Yesterday"
26. "Helter Skelter"
27. "Sgt. Pepper's Lonely Hearts Club Band (Reprise)"/"The End"
The Old Vic 192
1. Got to Get You Into My Life
2. Highway
3. All My Loving
4. Nineteen Hundred and Eighty Five
5. The Long and Winding Road
6. And I Love Her
7. Ob-La-Di, Ob-La-Da
8. Back in the USSR
9. Let It Be
10. Hey Jude
  - Encore
11. Get Back
River Plate Stadium II
1. "Magical Mystery Tour"
2. "Jet"
3. "All My Loving"
4. "Letting Go"
5. "Drive My Car"
6. "Highway"
7. "Let Me Roll It" (with "Foxy Lady" coda)
8. "The Long and Winding Road"
9. "Nineteen Hundred and Eighty-Five"
10. "Let 'Em In"
11. "My Love"
12. "I've Just Seen a Face"
13. "Bluebird"
14. "And I Love Her"
15. "Blackbird"
16. "Here Today"
17. "Dance Tonight"
18. "Mrs Vandebilt"
19. "Eleanor Rigby"
20. "Something"
21. "Sing the Changes"
22. "Band on the Run"
23. "Ob-La-Di, Ob-La-Da"
24. "Back in the U.S.S.R."
25. "I've Got a Feeling"
26. "Paperback Writer"
27. "A Day in the Life"/"Give Peace a Chance"
28. "Let It Be"
29. "Live and Let Die"
30. "Hey Jude"
  - Encore 1
31. "Day Tripper"
32. "Lady Madonna"
33. "Get Back"
  - Encore 2
34. "Yesterday"
35. "Helter Skelter"
36. "Sgt. Pepper's Lonely Hearts Club Band (Reprise)"/"The End"
Morumbi Stadium II
1. "Magical Mystery Tour"
2. "Jet"
3. "All My Loving"
4. "Letting Go"
5. "Got to Get You into My Life"
6. "Highway"
7. "Let Me Roll It" (with "Foxy Lady" coda)
8. "The Long and Winding Road"
9. "Nineteen Hundred and Eighty-Five"
10. "Let 'Em In"
11. "My Love"
12. "I'm Looking Through You"
13. "Two of Us"
14. "Blackbird"
15. "Here Today"
16. "Bluebird"
17. "Dance Tonight"
18. "Mrs Vandebilt"
19. "Eleanor Rigby"
20. "Something"
21. "Sing the Changes"
22. "Band on the Run"
23. "Ob-La-Di, Ob-La-Da"
24. "Back in the U.S.S.R."
25. "I've Got a Feeling"
26. "Paperback Writer"
27. "A Day in the Life"/"Give Peace a Chance"
28. "Let It Be"
29. "Live and Let Die"
30. "Hey Jude"
  - Encore 1
31. "Day Tripper"
32. "Lady Madonna"
33. "Get Back"
  - Encore 2
34. "Yesterday"
35. "Helter Skelter"
36. "Sgt. Pepper's Lonely Hearts Club Band (Reprise)"/"The End"
Apollo Theater
1. "Magical Mystery Tour"
2. "Jet"
3. "Drive My Car"
4. "All My Loving"
5. "One After 909"
6. "Let Me Roll It" (with "Foxy Lady" coda)
7. "The Long and Winding Road"
8. "Nineteen Hundred and Eighty-Five"
9. "Maybe I'm Amazed"
10. "Blackbird"
11. "I'm Looking Through You"
12. "Dance Tonight"
13. "Eleanor Rigby"
14. "Hitch Hike" (Tribute to Marvin Gaye)
15. "Band on the Run"
16. "Ob-La-Di, Ob-La-Da"
17. "Back in the U.S.S.R."
18. "A Day in the Life"/"Give Peace a Chance"
19. "Let It Be"
20. "Hey Jude"
  - Encore 1
21. "Wonderful Christmastime"
22. "I Saw Her Standing There"
23. "Get Back"
  - Encore 2
24. "Yesterday"
25. "Sgt. Pepper's Lonely Hearts Club Band (Reprise)"/"The End"
Hammersmith Apollo
1. Magical Mystery Tour
2. Jet
3. Got to Get You into My Life
4. All My Loving
5. One After 909
6. Drive My Car
7. Let Me Roll It
8. The Long and Winding Road
9. Nineteen Hundred and Eighty Five
10. Maybe I'm Amazed
11. Blackbird
12. Here Today
13. I'm Looking Through You
14. And I Love Her
15. Dance Tonight
16. Eleanor Rigby
17. Hitch Hike
18. Sing the Changes
19. Something
20. Band on the Run
21. Ob-La-Di, Ob-La-Da
22. Back in the USSR
23. A Day in the Life / Give Peace a Chance
24. Let It Be
25. Live and Let Die
26. Hey Jude
  - Encore 1
27. Wonderful Christmastime
28. I Saw Her Standing There
29. Get Back
  - Encore 2
30. Yesterday
31. Sgt. Pepper's Lonely Hearts Club Band / The End
Liverpool O2
1. Honey Hush
2. Magical Mystery Tour
3. Jet
4. Got to Get You into My Life
5. All My Loving
6. One After 909
7. Drive My Car
8. Let Me Roll It
9. The Long and Winding Road
10. Nineteen Hundred and Eighty Five
11. Don't Let the Sun Catch You Crying
12. Maybe I'm Amazed
13. Blackbird
14. Calico Skies
15. I've Just Seen a Face
16. And I Love Her
17. Dance Tonight
18. Eleanor Rigby
19. Hitch Hike
20. Highway
21. Something
22. Band on the Run
23. Ob-La-Di, Ob-La-Da
24. Back in the USSR
25. A Day in the Life / Give Peace a Chance
26. Let It Be
27. Hey Jude
  - Encore 1
28. Day Tripper
29. I Saw Her Standing There
30. Get Back
  - Encore 2
31. Yesterday
32. Lady Madonna
33. Sgt. Pepper's Lonely Hearts Club Band / The End
Monumental Stadium, Nacional Stadium, Olimpico Stadium I
1. "Hello Goodbye"
2. "Jet"
3. "All My Loving"
4. "Letting Go"
5. "Drive My Car"
6. "Sing the Changes"
7. "Let Me Roll It" (with "Foxy Lady" coda)
8. "The Long and Winding Road"
9. "Nineteen Hundred and Eighty-Five"
10. "Let 'Em In"
11. "I've Just Seen a Face"
12. "And I Love Her"
13. "Blackbird"
14. "Here Today"
15. "Dance Tonight"
16. "Mrs Vandebilt"
17. "Eleanor Rigby"
18. "Something"
19. "Band on the Run"
20. "Ob-La-Di, Ob-La-Da"
21. "Back in the U.S.S.R."
22. "I've Got a Feeling"
23. "Paperback Writer"
24. "A Day in the Life"/"Give Peace a Chance"
25. "Let It Be"
26. "Live and Let Die"
27. "Hey Jude"
  - Encore 1
28. "Day Tripper"
29. "Lady Madonna"
30. "Get Back"
  - Encore 2
31. "Yesterday"
32. "Helter Skelter"
33. "Sgt. Pepper's Lonely Hearts Club Band (Reprise)"/"The End"
Olimpico Stadium II
1. "Magical Mystery Tour"
2. "Jet"
3. "All My Loving"
4. "Coming Up"
5. "Got to Get You into My Life"
6. "Sing the Changes"
7. "Let Me Roll It" (with "Foxy Lady" coda)
8. "The Long and Winding Road"
9. "Nineteen Hundred and Eighty-Five"
10. "Let 'Em In"
11. "I'm Looking Through You"
12. "And I Love Her"
13. "Blackbird"
14. "Here Today"
15. "Dance Tonight"
16. "Mrs Vandebilt"
17. "Eleanor Rigby"
18. "Something"
19. "Band on the Run"
20. "Ob-La-Di, Ob-La-Da"
21. "Back in the U.S.S.R."
22. "I've Got a Feeling"
23. "Paperback Writer"
24. "A Day in the Life"/"Give Peace a Chance"
25. "Let It Be"
26. "Live and Let Die"
27. "Hey Jude"
  - Encore 1
28. "Day Tripper"
29. "Lady Madonna"
30. "I Saw Her Standing There"
  - Encore 2
31. "Yesterday"
32. "Helter Skelter"
33. "Sgt. Pepper's Lonely Hearts Club Band (Reprise)"/"The End"
MGM Grand Garden Arena
1. "Magical Mystery Tour"
2. "Junior's Farm
3. "All My Loving"
4. "Jet"
5. "Got to Get You into My Life"
6. "Sing the Changes"
7. "Let Me Roll It" (with "Foxy Lady" coda)
8. "The Long and Winding Road"
9. "Nineteen Hundred and Eighty-Five"
10. "Let 'Em In"
11. "Maybe I'm Amazed"
12. "I'm Looking Through You"
13. "And I Love Her"
14. "Blackbird"
15. "Here Today"
16. "Dance Tonight"
17. "Mrs Vandebilt"
18. "Eleanor Rigby"
19. "Something"
20. "Band on the Run"
21. "Ob-La-Di, Ob-La-Da"
22. "Back in the U.S.S.R."
23. "I've Got a Feeling"
24. "Paperback Writer"
25. "A Day in the Life"/"Give Peace a Chance"
26. "Let It Be"
27. "Live and Let Die"
28. "Hey Jude"
  - Encore 1
29. "Day Tripper"
30. "Get Back"
  - Encore 2
31. "Yesterday"
32. "Helter Skelter"
33. "Sgt. Pepper's Lonely Hearts Club Band (Reprise)"/"The End"

== Instruments played by band members ==
Songs	McCartney	Anderson	Ray	Wickens	Laboriel
"Venus and Mars/Rock Show" or "Magical Mystery Tour" or "Hello Goodbye"	Bass	Electric guitar	Acoustic guitar/Electric guitar or Electric guitar	Keyboards	Drums
"Jet"	Bass	Electric guitar	Electric guitar	Keyboards	Drums
"All My Loving"	Bass	Electric guitar	Electric guitar	Electric guitar	Drums
"Letting Go"	Bass	Electric guitar	Electric guitar	Keyboards	Drums
"Got to Get You into My Life" or "Drive My Car"	Bass	Electric guitar	Electric guitar	Keyboards	Drums
"Highway" (not played in 2011)	Bass	Electric guitar	Electric guitar	Harmonica/Keyboards	Drums
"Let Me Roll It"	Electric guitar	Electric guitar	Bass	Keyboards	Drums
"The Long and Winding Road"	Piano	Electric guitar	Bass	Keyboards	Drums
"Nineteen Hundred and Eighty-Five"	Piano	Electric guitar	Bass	Keyboards/Maracas	Drums
"Let 'Em In"	Piano	Electric guitar	Bass	Keyboards	Drums
"My Love" (not played in 2011)	Piano	Electric guitar	Bass	Keyboards	Drums
"I'm Looking Through You" or "I've Just Seen a Face"	Acoustic guitar	Acoustic guitar	Bass	Tambourine/Keyboards or Shaker	Drums
"Two of Us" or "And I Love Her"	Acoustic guitar	Acoustic guitar	Bass	Acoustic guitar or Claves	Drums
"Blackbird"	Acoustic guitar	None	None	None	None
"Here Today"	Acoustic guitar	None	None	None	None
"Dance Tonight"	Mandolin	Electric guitar	Bass	Keyboards	Drums
"Mrs Vandebilt"	Acoustic guitar	Electric guitar	Bass	Keyboards	Drums
"Eleanor Rigby"	Acoustic guitar	None	None	Keyboards	None
"Ram On" (only in some cities)	Ukulele	Electric guitar	Bass	Keyboards	Drums
"Something"	Ukulele/Acoustic guitar	Electric guitar	Bass	Keyboards	Drums
"Sing the Changes"	Bass	Electric guitar	Acoustic guitar	Keyboards	Drums
"Band on the Run"	Bass	Electric guitar	Electric guitar/Acoustic guitar	Keyboards	Drums
"Ob-La-Di, Ob-La-Da"	Bass	Electric guitar	Acoustic guitar	Keyboards	Drums
"Back in the U.S.S.R."	Bass	Electric guitar	Electric guitar	Keyboards	Drums
"I've Got a Feeling"	Electric guitar	Electric guitar	Bass	Keyboards	Drums
"Paperback Writer"	Electric guitar	Electric guitar	Bass	Keyboards	Drums
"A Day in the Life"/"Give Peace a Chance"	Bass	Acoustic guitar	Acoustic guitar	Keyboards	Drums
"Let It Be"	Piano	Electric guitar	Bass	Keyboards	Drums
"Live and Let Die"	Piano	Electric guitar	Bass	Keyboards	Drums
"Hey Jude"	Piano	Electric guitar	Bass	Keyboards	Drums
"Day Tripper"	Bass	Electric guitar	Electric guitar	Tambourine	Drums
"Lady Madonna"	Piano	Electric guitar	Bass	Keyboards	Drums
"Get Back"	Bass	Electric guitar	Electric guitar	Keyboards	Drums
"Yesterday"	Acoustic guitar	None	None	Keyboards	None
"Mull of Kintyre" (only in Glasgow and Toronto)	Acoustic guitar	Acoustic guitar	Bass	Accordion	Drums
"Helter Skelter"	Bass	Electric guitar	Electric guitar	Electric guitar	Drums
"Sgt. Pepper's"/"The End"	Electric guitar	Electric guitar	Bass/Electric guitar	Keyboards	Drums

== See also ==
- List of Paul McCartney concert tours
