= Mamunia =

Single by Paul McCartney and Wings

from the album Band on the Run
- A-side: "Jet"
- Released: 28 January 1974
- Recorded: September 1973
- Studio: EMI Studios, Lagos, Nigeria
- Genre: Afro-soul
- Length: 4:51
- Label: Apple
- Songwriters: Paul McCartney; Linda McCartney
- Producer: Paul McCartney

Wings singles chronology
"Mrs Vandebilt" (1973)	"Mamunia" (1974)	"Band on the Run" (1974)

Music video
- "Mamunia" on YouTube

Band on the Run track listing
- 9 tracks Side one: 1. "Band on the Run"; 2. "Jet"; 3. "Bluebird"; 4. "Mrs. Vandebilt"; 5. "Let Me Roll It"; Side two: 6. "Mamunia"; 7. "No Words"; 8. "Picasso's Last Words (Drink to Me)"; 9. "Nineteen Hundred and Eighty-Five"

"Mamunia" is a song written by Paul and Linda McCartney that first appeared on Wings' 1973 album Band on the Run. It was also released as the B-side of the "Jet" single in the US, but was replaced by "Let Me Roll It" when "Mamunia" was being considered as a possible future A-side.

== Music and lyrics ==
"Mamunia" was written in Marrakesh early in 1973. The title was inspired by the hotel Mamounia in which the McCartneys were staying at the time. Mamounia (مامونية) means "safe haven" in Arabic. According to author John Blaney, McCartney used the term as a "metaphor for rebirth". "Mamunia" is one of several songs on Band on the Run, including the title track and "Bluebird", which espouse a theme of escape and freedom. The song's verses use rain as a metaphor for the difficult times people face. The song's message is not to complain about difficult times because everyone faces tough times and it's better to focus on your "safe haven" during those times.

"Mamunia" was the first song recorded for Band on the Run in Lagos, Nigeria. Paul McCartney sings the lead vocals and plays guitar and bass, Denny Laine plays guitar and sings backing vocals, and Linda McCartney provides backing vocals as well. One of McCartney's roadies plays bass drum. Like "Bluebird", "Mamunia" is primarily acoustic. Music critic Robert Christgau described the song's intro as "Afro-soul". The song and the refrain are in the key of A major and the verses are in the key of C major. Authors Chip Madinger and Mark Easter describe the song as "so lightweight it'll float off" but note that it is "relentlessly melodic".

== Music video ==
A music video was made for "Mamunia" in July 1974. Jim Quick was the producer. The video is mostly animated, and Paul McCartney does not appear. It was first shown on The Dave Cash Radio Show. It appears on the 2007 video set The McCartney Years.

== Reception ==
Professor Vincent Benitez described it as a "typical example of McCartney's style of pop music". Blaney describes it as "a bright and breezy pop song, celebrating the good things in life and equally as delightful." Mojo Magazine described it as "a pearl of naive wisdom". Authors Robert Dimery and Michael Lydon described "Mamunia" as a "solid side-two track". Paul McCartney biographer Peter Carlin claimed that "Mamunia" "takes a more laid-back approach to the sentiment in [The Beatles' song] 'Rain.'"

"Mamunia" was included on the deluxe edition of the compilation album Wings in 2025.

== Personnel ==
According to Luca Perasi:

- Paul McCartney – lead and backing vocals, acoustic guitar, bass guitar, percussion, shaker
- Linda McCartney – backing vocals, Moog synthesiser
- Denny Laine – backing vocals, acoustic and electric guitar, congas
- Ian Horne – bass drum

== Covers ==
Don Fleming covered "Mamunia" on his 2003 Band on the Run remake. Larry Page covered the song on his mid-1990s albums John Paul George Ringo and Imagine.
