= Picasso's Last Words (Drink to Me) =

Song by Paul McCartney and Wings

from the album Band on the Run
- Released: 7 December 1973
- Recorded: September–October 1973
- Studio: EMI Studios, Lagos, Nigeria
- Genre: Rock
- Length: 5:49
- Label: Apple
- Songwriters: Paul McCartney; Linda McCartney
- Producer: Paul McCartney

Band on the Run track listing
- 9 tracks Side one: 1. "Band on the Run"; 2. "Jet"; 3. "Bluebird"; 4. "Mrs. Vandebilt"; 5. "Let Me Roll It"; Side two: 6. "Mamunia"; 7. "No Words"; 8. "Picasso's Last Words (Drink to Me)"; 9. "Nineteen Hundred and Eighty-Five"

"Picasso's Last Words (Drink to Me)" is a song by the rock band Paul McCartney and Wings, released on their 1973 album Band on the Run. The longest track on the album, it was not released as a single. The song includes interpolations of "Jet" and "Mrs. Vandebilt," the second and fourth tracks on the album, respectively. Wings band member Denny Laine covered "Picasso's Last Words (Drink to Me)" in 2007 on his album Performs the Hits of Wings. An abbreviated performance of the song appears on the live album Wings over America.

== Writing ==
In a 1984 television interview on Aspel & Company, McCartney recalls while on holiday in Jamaica, Dustin Hoffman (while shooting the film Papillon), asked McCartney to dinner. While dining, the subject of songwriting came up. Hoffman asked McCartney, "Can you just write them [songs] like that? You know, like Marvin Hamlisch does?" McCartney replied, "I can't really. I don't do it like that." Hoffman then went on, "I've got something here I'd like you to try it with," and he handed McCartney a copy of Time magazine; which had an article on Pablo Picasso with his purported last words said to dinner guests the night before he died: "Drink to me, drink to my health. You know I can't drink anymore." (Spanish: Bebe a mí, bebe a mi salud, sabes que no puedo beber más.) Hoffman said, "That's great. Can you write a song with that?" McCartney started to sing a melody to the words. Upon which Hoffman, "hit the ceiling" and shouted, "Annie! He's doing it! This is it! Look at this! Hey!" McCartney said, "So I was just showing off, you know. So I wrote this song for him."

In a later interview on British TV channel ITV1 for the program Wings: Band on the Run, to promote the November 2010 2×CD/2×DVD rerelease of the original album, McCartney recalled the story again but with different details. While on vacation in Montego Bay, Jamaica, McCartney "snuck" onto the set of the film Papillon where he met Dustin Hoffman and Steve McQueen. After a dinner with Hoffman, with McCartney playing around on guitar, Hoffman did not believe that McCartney could write a song "about anything", so Hoffman pulled out a magazine where they saw the story of the death of Pablo Picasso and his famous last words, "Drink to me, drink to my health. You know I can't drink anymore." McCartney created a demo of the song and lyrics on the spot, prompting Hoffman to exclaim to his wife: "look, he's doing it … he's doing it!"

== Recording ==
While recording Band on the Run in Lagos, Nigeria, Wings were invited to former Cream drummer Ginger Baker's ARC Studios in the nearby suburb of Ikeja. While Baker insisted to McCartney that they should record the entire album there, McCartney was reluctant and agreed he would spend one day there. "Picasso's Last Words" was recorded during that time and Baker contributed by playing a tin can full of gravel.

== Reception ==
Ultimate Classic Rock critic Nick DeRiso rated "Picasso's Last Words (Drink to Me)" as Denny Laine's 10th best song.

== Personnel ==
- Paul McCartney – vocals, guitar, bass guitar, drums, drum machine, electric piano
- Linda McCartney – backing vocals
- Denny Laine – vocals, guitar
- Ginger Baker – percussion
- Tony Visconti – orchestrations
