= The Lyrics: 1956 to the Present =

2021 non-fiction book by Paul McCartney and Paul Muldoon

- Editor: Paul Muldoon
- Author: Paul McCartney
- Language: English
- Subject: Paul McCartney's lyrics
- Published: November 2, 2021
- Publisher: Liveright, Penguin Books Ltd, C.H. Beck
- Publication place: US
- Pages: 960
- ISBN: 978-1-63149-256-3
- Website: Official website

The Lyrics: 1956 to the Present is a book released in November 2021 by the English musician Paul McCartney and the Irish poet Paul Muldoon. It is published by Liveright / W. W. Norton & Company in the United States of America, Penguin Books Ltd in the United Kingdom, and C.H. Beck in Germany.

Muldoon's conversations recorded with McCartney for the book turned into a podcast McCartney: A Life in Lyrics, released throughout 2023 and 2024.

== Synopsis ==
The book consists of McCartney's discussions with Muldoon about the lyrics of 154 of his songs written during his time as a member of the rock bands the Beatles and Wings and as a solo artist. The songs are arranged alphabetically over two volumes. The book also includes many previously unseen photographs, paintings and handwritten texts. Muldoon spoke with McCartney over five years in two- to three-hour sessions during the creation of the book and felt that McCartney's "insights into his own artistic process confirm a notion at which we had but guessed—that Paul McCartney is a major literary figure who draws upon, and extends, the long tradition of poetry in English". Muldoon felt that their conversations mimicked McCartney's writing sessions with John Lennon as they were both "determined never to leave the room without something interesting".

McCartney had always previously declined to write an autobiography, recalling that he had been asked "More often than I can count" as "the time has never been right". McCartney has said that he has never kept a diary to recall the past but does have "my songs, hundreds of them, which I've learned serve much the same purpose. And these songs span my entire life".

== Reception ==
The book received mostly positive reviews. David Hepworth of The Guardian wrote: "Whereas the other Beatles wrote fitfully after the group broke up, Paul kept getting out his pencil, taking his guitar into a quiet corner and writing yet another song, less on the basis of inspiration than the feeling that it was a muscle he must use or lose. It's this more than 10,000 hours spent setting himself the eternal puzzle of getting from the beginning of a song to its end that enabled him to dazzle Dustin Hoffman by writing "Picasso's Last Words (Drink to Me)" in front of him. 'Can you write a song about anything?' Hoffman asked. Yes, Dustin, he clearly can." He was also impressed by the people mentioned by McCartney: "The index is a reminder of the fact that, having been actively famous for 60 years, Paul McCartney has met everyone he’s had a mind to meet. Having learned from Craig Brown's recent book that Malcolm Muggeridge came to see the Beatles play in Hamburg, I no longer bat an eyelid at the revelation that in 1964 Paul rocked up unannounced at the door of Bertrand Russell."

David Hajdu of The New York Times noted: "McCartney shows how deeply he is steeped in literary history and how much his output as a songwriter has in common with the works of the likes of Dickens and Shakespeare." He concludes: "Aaaah … we realize: Paul really is a word man, the more literary and cerebral Beatle."

David Kirby of The Washington Post praised the book and wrote: "Reading The Lyrics is like standing in a master chef’s kitchen as he prepares a dish, adding a dash of this and a spoonful of that and talking to us so winningly that we don’t realize till later that he has withheld an ingredient, one that, because he was so deeply engaged himself, he didn’t know he was withholding."

Blake Morrison wrote in a review for the Guardian that the stories recalled by McCartney are unusual and entertaining:

Getting it down, he used dummy words: what became "Yesterday all my troubles seemed so far away" began as "scrambled eggs, oh my baby, how I love your legs". The backstories to the songs are often as interesting as the lyrics. With "Ticket to Ride" he and John were also thinking about a trip they'd made to Ryde, on the Isle of Wight; "Blackbird", with its "broken wings", was written after the assassination of Martin Luther King; "Hey Jude" was originally "Hey Jules" and written for the young Julian Lennon after John had divorced Cynthia; the portrait of a community in "Penny Lane" took its bearings from Dylan Thomas's Under Milk Wood while "She's Leaving Home" 'was almost like a shooting script for the Wednesday Play'.

Morrison concluded: "Stripped of the music, the words on the page can look random or banal. But at best he's a wonderfully versatile lyricist: troubadour, comedian, elegist, social commentator, pasticheur. And anyone with even half an interest in the Beatles will find The Lyrics fascinating."

The book has been translated into eight different languages: German (translator Conny Lösch), Dutch (translator Robert Neugarten), Spanish, Portuguese, French (translators Hélène Borraz, Raphaël Meltz and Louise Moaty), Finnish, Swedish and Italian (translators Franco Zanetti and Luca Perasi).

== Podcast ==
McCartney: A Life in Lyrics
- Country of origin: United States

Creative team
- Created by: iHeartPodcasts, MPL, Pushkin Industries

Cast and voices
- Hosted by: Paul Muldoon
- Starring: Paul McCartney

Production
- Length: 19–39 minutes

Publication
- Original release: 2023-10-04

Muldoon's conversations recorded with McCartney for the book were turned into a podcast entitled McCartney: A Life in Lyrics, with the two series co-produced by iHeartPodcasts, MPL Communications, and Pushkin Industries. Season 1 was released on audio streaming platforms between October and December 2023; season 2 was released between February and April 2024.

=== Season 1 ===
1. "Eleanor Rigby" (1966)
2. "Back in the U.S.S.R." (1968)
3. "Let It Be" (1970)
4. "Mull of Kintyre" (1977)
5. "Penny Lane" (1967)
6. "Uncle Albert/Admiral Halsey" (1971)
7. "Here Today" (1982)
8. "Live and Let Die" (1973)
9. "Magical Mystery Tour" (1967)
10. "Jenny Wren" (2005), "Blackbird" (1968)
11. "Too Many People" (1971)
12. "Helter Skelter" (1968)

=== Season 2 ===
1. "Love Me Do" (1962)
2. "Band on the Run" (1974)
3. "Maxwell’s Silver Hammer" (1969)
4. "Yesterday" (1965)
5. "Picasso’s Last Words (Drink to Me)" (1973)
6. "Silly Love Songs" (1976)
7. "A Day in the Life" (1967)
8. "Hey Jude" (1968)
9. "Here, There and Everywhere" (1966)
10. "Give Ireland Back to the Irish" (1972)
11. "Michelle" (1965)
12. "The End" (1969)
