= Country Dreamer =

Single by Paul McCartney & Wings
- A-side: "Helen Wheels"
- Released: 26 October 1973
- Recorded: 1972
- Genre: Country
- Length: 3:09
- Label: Apple Records
- Songwriters: Paul McCartney, Linda McCartney
- Producer: Paul McCartney

Paul McCartney & Wings singles chronology
"Live and Let Die" (1973)	"Helen Wheels" / "Country Dreamer" (1973)	"Mrs Vandebilt" (1973)

"Country Dreamer" is the B-side song to the single "Helen Wheels" released by Paul McCartney and Wings on 26 October 1973 in the UK and 12 November 1973 in the US. It was recorded in October 1972, and its country ambiance is similar to "Heart of the Country" from Paul McCartney's 1971 album Ram.

== Release ==
The song was originally intended to be on Red Rose Speedway when it was to be a double album and was included on the 1993 The Paul McCartney Collection CD release of Band on the Run. It was also included on the 1987 CD reissue of Red Rose Speedway as well as the 2018 remastered version. In addition to being included on those releases, it was also on the 2010 remastered version of Band on the Run, along with the A-side "Helen Wheels". Both were included on The 7" Singles Box in 2022.

A version of the track was recorded in the backyard of Abbey Road Studios during the recording of One Hand Clapping in 1974. It was unreleased until 2024, when it was included on "The Backyard" Bonus 7-inch.

== Reception ==
NME writers Roy Carr and Tony Tyler described it as "cute", saying that "although it takes four bars too long to get to the point, [it] is a model of simplicity and a tasteful exercise in three-part harmony and clean unobtrusive production."

== Personnel ==
According to the author Luca Perasi:

- Paul McCartney – lead and backing vocals, acoustic guitar, piano, percussion
- Linda McCartney – backing vocals
- Denny Laine – bass, backing vocals
- Henry McCullough – pedal steel guitar
- Denny Seiwell – brushes, percussion

Note: Perasi is unsure if Paul McCartney and Seiwell played percussion.
