= Band on the Run =

1973 album by Paul McCartney and Wings

Studio album by Paul McCartney and Wings
- Released: 30 November 1973
- Recorded: September–October 1973
- Studios: EMI and ARC, Lagos, Nigeria; AIR and Kingsway Recorders, London
- Genres: Rock; pop rock
- Length: 41:08 (UK version); 44:17 (US version)
- Label: Apple
- Producer: Paul McCartney

Paul McCartney and Wings chronology
Red Rose Speedway (1973)	Band on the Run (1973)	Venus and Mars (1975)

Singles from Band on the Run
- 1. "Mrs. Vandebilt" Released: January 1974; 2. "Jet" Released: 28 January 1974; 3. "Band on the Run" Released: 8 April 1974

Band on the Run is the third studio album by the British rock band Paul McCartney and Wings, released on 30 November 1973 in the United Kingdom and 5 December 1973 in the United States. It was Paul McCartney's fifth album after leaving the Beatles in April 1970 and his final album on Apple Records. A rock and pop rock album, Band on the Run's songs reflect themes of escape and freedom.

The album was mostly recorded at EMI's studio in Lagos, Nigeria, as McCartney wanted to make an album in an exotic location. Shortly before departing for Lagos, drummer Denny Seiwell and guitarist Henry McCullough left the group. With no time to recruit replacements, McCartney went into the studio with just his wife Linda and Denny Laine. McCartney therefore played bass, drums, percussion and most of the lead guitar parts. The studio was of poor quality, and conditions in Nigeria were tense and difficult; the McCartneys were robbed at knifepoint, losing a bag of song lyrics and demo tapes. After the band returned to England, they completed final overdubs and further recording in London, mostly at AIR Studios. Clive Arrowsmith's cover photograph, shot at Osterley Park, West London, depicts the McCartneys and Laine with six celebrities dressed as convicts, and posed as though caught by a prison searchlight.

Although sales were modest initially, its commercial performance was aided by two hit singles – "Jet" and "Band on the Run". McCartney did not want any singles, but agreed because of modest sales. At Capitol Records' request, the non-album single "Helen Wheels" was added to the American version of the album for commercial reasons. Enhanced by the success of the singles, Band on the Run topped the album charts in the UK and the US and became the top-selling studio album of 1974 in the UK and Australia. It remains McCartney's most successful album.

After a string of poorly received projects, Band on the Run revitalised McCartney's critical standing, becoming his best-reviewed album following the break-up of the Beatles. It remains celebrated as one of McCartney's best solo albums and one of the best by a Beatle. It appeared on lists of the greatest albums of all time by Rolling Stone in 2012 and by NME in 2013. The album has been reissued numerous times with bonus tracks, most recently in 2024 for its 50th anniversary.

== Background ==
Paul thought, 'I've got to do it, either I give up and cut my throat or [I] get my magic back.'

— Linda McCartney to Sounds magazine

By 1973, three years after the break-up of the Beatles, Paul McCartney had yet to regain his artistic credibility or find favour with some music critics for his post-Beatles work. After completing a successful UK tour with his band Wings in July 1973, he planned their third album as a means to re-establish himself after the mixed reception given to Wild Life (1971) and Red Rose Speedway (1973).

Keen to record outside the United Kingdom, McCartney asked EMI to send him a list of all their international recording studios. He selected Lagos in Nigeria and was attracted to the idea of recording in Africa. In August, the band – consisting of McCartney and his wife Linda, ex-Moody Blues guitarist and pianist Denny Laine, Henry McCullough on lead guitar, and Denny Seiwell on drums – started rehearsals for the new album at the McCartneys' Scottish farm. During one rehearsal session, McCullough and McCartney argued, and McCullough quit. Seiwell left a week later, the night before the band flew out to Nigeria. This left just the McCartneys and Laine to record in Lagos, assisted by former Beatles engineer Geoff Emerick. Paul McCartney had chosen Lagos, as he felt it would be a glamorous location where he and the band could sun on the beach during the day and record at night; the reality, however, was that, after the end of a civil war in 1970, Nigeria was run by a military government, with corruption and disease commonplace.

== Recording ==
=== Lagos ===
The band and their entourage arrived in Lagos on 30 August 1973. EMI's studio, located on Wharf Road in the suburb of Apapa, was ramshackle and under-equipped. The control desk was faulty and there was only one eight-track tape machine. The band rented houses near the airport in Ikeja, an hour away from the studio. McCartney, Linda, and their three children stayed in one, while Laine, Emerick, and Wings' two roadies, Trevor and Ian, stayed in another.

[Paul and I] made the album as though we weren't in a band, as though we were just two producers/musicians.

— Denny Laine

The group established a routine of recording during the week and playing tourist on the weekends. McCartney temporarily joined a local country club, where he spent most mornings. The band was driven to the studio in the early afternoon, and recording would last into the late evening or early morning. To compensate for the departed band members, McCartney played drums and lead guitar parts on top of bass guitar, with Laine playing rhythm guitar and Linda adding keyboards. Laine explained: "We put the backing track down first, and we had to remember the arrangement, but just play the drums and the guitar part. So you're now learning the songs in little pieces, rather than as a song." McCartney had originally considered former Cream member Ginger Baker to play drums on the album, but Baker declined when he found out the band were using the Lagos studio rather than Baker's own ARC studio in Ikeja to record the album. The sessions began on 3 September. The first track they recorded was "Mamunia", the title for which McCartney appropriated from the name of a hotel in Marrakesh where Wings had stayed in April 1973, followed by "Band on the Run" and "Helen Wheels". The second week, 10–14 September, the band recorded "Mrs. Vandebilt", the McCartney–Laine collaboration "No Words", and "Let Me Roll It".

Aside from the challenges presented by the substandard studio, various incidents plagued Wings' stay in Lagos. After the second week, the local Afrobeat pioneer and political activist Fela Kuti publicly accused the band of being in Africa to exploit and steal African music after they visited his club. Kuti went to the studio to confront McCartney, who played their songs for him to show that they contained no local influence. The following day, to thank Baker for assisting in the Kuti incident, Wings recorded the song "Picasso's Last Words (Drink to Me)" at Baker's ARC studio, with Baker himself shaking a tin can filled with gravel on the track. While out walking that same night against advice, the McCartneys were robbed at knifepoint. The assailants made off with all of their valuables, stealing a bag containing a notebook full of handwritten lyrics and songs, and cassettes containing demos for songs to be recorded. The next day after the mugging, McCartney was overdubbing a vocal track when he began gasping for air. According to Emerick: "Within seconds, [McCartney] turned as white as a sheet, explaining to us in a croaking voice that he couldn't catch his breath. We decided to take him outside for some fresh air ... [but] once he was exposed to the blazing heat, he felt even worse and began keeling over, finally fainting dead away at our feet. Linda began screaming hysterically; she was convinced that he was having a heart attack ... The official diagnosis was that he had suffered a bronchial spasm brought on by too much smoking."

Following his hospital visit, McCartney decided to return to England. Wings hosted a beach barbecue to celebrate the end of recording, and on 23 September 1973, they flew back to England, where they were met by fans and journalists. Upon returning to London, the McCartneys received a letter from EMI dated before the band had left England, warning them not go to Lagos due to an outbreak of cholera.

=== London ===
Having recorded most of the album in Lagos, the band spent October 1973 finishing it at George Martin's AIR Studios in London. One of the tracks, "Jet", named after one of the McCartney children's ponies, was recorded in its entirety at AIR. The first thing McCartney did was prepare the release of a single from the Lagos sessions. He chose "Helen Wheels", the only fully completed track, as the A-side, choosing the Red Rose Speedway outtake "Country Dreamer" as the B-side. The following day, 3 October, McCartney spent time transferring many of the eight-track Lagos recordings to sixteen-track, while the band also recorded "Bluebird" and Linda's song "Oriental Nightfish". Two days later, the band taped "Nineteen Hundred and Eighty-Five".

The McCartneys and Laine continued overdubbing the Lagos recordings throughout October. All of the album's orchestral arrangements were taped at AIR in a single day, 17 October, conducted by Tony Visconti. Visconti was given three days to write the arrangements, including for the 60-piece orchestra on the title track. He said the arrangements were collaborations with McCartney. Another contributor was saxophonist Howie Casey, who overdubbed solos on "Bluebird", "Mrs. Vandebilt", and "Jet", and would go on to become Wings' regular horn player. On 8 October, Nigerian musician Remi Kabaka added percussion to "Bluebird". Mixing briefly took place at London's Kingsway Studios for two days, as AIR was booked, before completing at EMI Studios by the end of October. (Note: Emerick had only four days to mix the entire album because he was scheduled for another project at AIR on 29 October.) Compared to the almost year-long production of Red Rose Speedway, Band on the Run was completed in only eight weeks.

== Music and lyrics ==
It's a collection of songs, and the basic idea about the band on the run is a kind of prison escape. At the beginning of the album, the guy is stuck inside four walls and breaks out. There is a thread, but not a concept.

— Paul McCartney

A rock and pop rock album, Band on the Run contains ballads and rockers. Several of the songs reflect themes of escape and freedom, while the structure of the album recalled the Beatles' Sgt. Pepper's Lonely Hearts Club Band and Abbey Road. The song "Band on the Run" was partly inspired by a remark George Harrison had made during one of the many business meetings the Beatles attended in 1969 in an effort to address the problems afflicting their Apple Corps enterprise. Four years later, the album's creation coincided with what author Peter Doggett terms McCartney's "moral victory in the debate over Allen Klein", as Harrison, John Lennon, and Ringo Starr now became embroiled in litigation against Klein – the business manager they had appointed to run Apple in 1969, despite strong opposition from McCartney. Doggett writes that McCartney was perhaps liberated creatively by this recent development, resulting in Band on the Run bearing "a frothy self-confidence that was reminiscent of the Beatles at their most productive".

=== Side one ===
Author John Blaney describes "Band on the Run" as a "five-minute mini-opera", with lyrics about freedom and escape. "Jet" was named after one of McCartney's Labrador Retriever puppies. A rocker likened to the sound of Marc Bolan's T. Rex, McCartney said that the song's lyrics meaningless, saying: "It means something to me when I do it, and it means something to the record buyer, but if I'm asked to analyse it, I can't really explain what it is. 'Suffragette' was crazy enough to work/ It sounded silly, so I liked it." "Bluebird", written in Jamaica in 1971, is a continuation of the album's emancipation themes. Blaney interprets the bluebird as " a metaphor for the transcendent power of love and the liberation of the human spirit from mental and physical bondage".

In "Mrs. Vandebilt", McCartney presents a more confident, carefree and optimistic attitude, arguing that there is "no use" in "worrying". The song features the line "I've done plenty of time on my own", which authors Allan Kozinn and Adrian Sinclair write ties it back to the title track's prison narrative, while the "Ho, Hey Ho" sections evoke the work songs of chain gangs. The authors also note that the song's opening line, "Down in the jungle, living in a tent", could be interpreted as a reference to the band's time in Lagos, although McCartney actually took the line from a sketch on the BBC radio sketch show Stand Easy. "Let Me Roll It", written at McCartney's Scotland home, has been described as a "slow rocker with an arresting guitar riff", and has been compared to the music of John Lennon. McCartney later explained that it was not intended to be a Lennon pastiche, but noted the use of tape echo "did sound more like John than me".

=== Side two ===
"Mamunia" was written in early 1973 during a visit to Marrakesh. Its title was inspired by the hotel Mamounia, which means "safe haven" in Arabic. The song, like "Band on the Run" and "Bluebird", evokes a theme of escape and freedom. According to author Vincent Benitez, the song's message is not to complain about difficult times because everyone faces tough times and it's better to focus on your "safe haven" during those times. "No Words", co-written by McCartney and Laine, features vocals from all three band members, as well as backing vocals from their roadies, Ian Horne and Trevor Jones, although their vocals are buried in the mix. The lyrics express the singer's desire for a woman who he fears may not be only interested in him. "Helen Wheels", appearing only on the US edition of the album, is a play on "hell on wheels". It is a beat-style song about McCartney's Land Rover, describing a journey from Scotland to England on the M6 motorway.

"Picasso's Last Words (Drink to Me)" was written in Jamaica following a conversation the McCartneys had with actor Dustin Hoffman and his wife. Alluding to Picasso's cubist art style, Blaney writes that "McCartney's poetic juxtapositions evoke notions of thematic and temporal simultaneity comparable to the cubist's experiments with form and space." It includes the band members singing the refrain of "Jet"; the "Ho, Hey Ho" section of "Mrs. Vandebilt", and ends with a brief fragment of the title track as it fades out, which Kozinn and Sinclair argue gives the album "a sense of thematic unity". The song also features a recording of the BBC French Language Service programme "Le Flash Touristique"; Kozinn and Sinclair say it was meant to "evoke the French radio broadcast Picasso heard the night he died". Robin Denselow, in his review of the album for The Guardian, likened "Picasso's Last Words" to "a New Orleans-style funeral celebration transferred to the Mediterranean". The album ends with "Nineteen Hundred and Eighty-Five", a piano-drive rocker featuring Mellotron, horns and a full orchestra. It continues the album's theme of escape by describing the singer achieving artistic freedom through love. Its lyrics have been described as "gibberish" that act as placeholders for the cinematic music.

== Artwork and packaging ==
The album cover photograph was taken at Osterley Park, West London, on 28 October 1973 by photographer Clive Arrowsmith (Note: Arrowsmith had known McCartney from Liverpool. He was also a classmate of John Lennon's at the Liverpool College of Art, and the art director for the Beatles' radio show Ready, Steady, Go.) from a concept by Hipgnosis and McCartney. Mirroring the theme of the title track, it depicts the McCartneys, Laine, and six celebrities dressed as convicts and posed as though caught by a prison searchlight. The six celebrities are television presenter and journalist Michael Parkinson, singer and actor Kenny Lynch, actor James Coburn, broadcaster and politician Clement Freud, actor Christopher Lee, and boxer John Conteh. Arrowsmith said the photo used for the cover was one of four he found acceptable out of the 24 pictures he took during the session. The spotlight's low potency meant everyone had to stand still for two seconds for proper exposure, which was made difficult by the photographer and subjects reportedly being in a "substance haze" following a party held by Paul McCartney. The golden hue of the picture comes from Arrowsmith's use of daylight film instead of nighttime Tungsten film, which would have been more typical for the setting. Parkinson recalled the shoot as "a lovely day, a family day", saying that "even though we resembled a motley crew we genuinely knew each other and liked the idea of posing together."

The album cover features Arrowsmith's photograph, with the album title above it in typography designed by Hipgnosis in-house designer George Hardy. Since the band's name did not appear on the cover, Capitol Records adhered stickers listing so to the front. The back cover is a photograph, also taken by Arrowsmith, depicting a police officer's desktop trying to track down the fugitives, Paul, Linda and Laine. Also featured are three black-and-white solo shots of the trio, each rubber-stamped with a circular passport stamp with the words London on the top, Sep 1973 in the centre and Lagos on the bottom. The desk features a cup of coffee, writing utensils, a cigar and paperwork, among other items. Album credits include the album's title, the band members' names, followed by the track listing. Emerick and Casey are credited for their contributions, although Kabaka is not. Additionally, Arrowsmith, Visconti, Wings' roadies Ian and Trevor, EMI's typographer Gordon House and Storm Thorgerson are mentioned but their contributions are not specified. Visconti was surprised he was not correctly credited for his work until the 25th-anniversary reissue of the album. Not mentioned are the band name, AIR and Kingsway Studios, and Hipgnosis.

Hipgnosis added minor differences in packaging between the British and American editions, including the order of the band member portraits, the positions of the desk items, and variations in the disc labels. The inner sleeve contains song lyrics and a black-and-white image of the McCartneys and Laine with a group of Nigerian children, taken during the last day in Lagos. A poster was also included, featuring Polaroid camera snapshots by Linda and other session shots, taken in both Lagos and London. The disc labels feature some references to Apple Records, which differ between the British and American editions. (Note: McCartney had removed references to the label on Wings' previous releases.)

== Release ==
Apple Records issued Band on the Run in the UK on 30 November (as Apple PAS 10007), and in the U.S. on 5 December (as Apple SO 3415). Its release came two weeks after John Lennon's Mind Games. Rather than having the band promote the album on radio and television or with a tour, McCartney undertook a series of magazine interviews, most notably with Paul Gambaccini for Rolling Stone. The conversations with Gambaccini took place at various locations from September 1973 onward, and combined to form, in the words of authors Chip Madinger and Mark Easter, "a remarkably forthcoming interview in comparison to the 'thumbs-aloft' profiles usually allowed by [McCartney]". It was McCartney's last album released on Apple Records.

"Helen Wheels" was released as a non-album single in the UK on 19 October 1973, (Note: Released on 5 November in the US.) and became a top 10 hit in America the following January. For commercial reasons, Capitol Records, Apple's US distributor, requested "Helen Wheels" be added to the album. McCartney believed the song did not fit the album's concept, but agreed to add it to the American version, sequenced between "No Words" and "Picasso's Last Words (Drink to Me)", but absent from the British version. (Note: In Britain, it was customary for singles to be absent from albums because the belief was that fans would not want to pay for a single twice. In America, singles were viewed as teasers for albums; fans considered it convenient to have singles already on albums.) While "Helen Wheels" is not included on CD editions of Band on the Run in the UK (except as a bonus track on the 1993 The Paul McCartney Collection edition of the album), it has often appeared on CD releases of the album in the US and Canada, starting with the initial Columbia Records release in 1984. Early versions of the Capitol release fail to list "Helen Wheels" on the label or the CD insert, making the song a "hidden track".

At the 17th Annual Grammy Awards in 1975, Band on the Run was nominated for Album of the Year, with Emerick winning the award for Best Engineered Non-Classical Album.

== Commercial performance ==
Initially, the album did not sell especially well, with the record-buying public wary after Wings' preceding releases. On the UK Albums Chart, Band on the Run climbed to number 9 on 22 December, remaining there for a second week before dropping to number 13. On America's Billboard Top LPs & Tape chart, it peaked at number 7 on 2 February 1974, and then spent the next six weeks in the lower reaches of the top ten. The album went on to achieve considerable success, however, thanks to the popularity of the two singles "Jet" and the title track. Writing in 1981, Bob Woffinden described Band on the Run as the first Beatles-related release to be "planned with a marketing strategy", as Capitol Records now assumed a fully active role in promoting the album following the removal of Klein's ABKCO Industries as managers of Apple. Although McCartney had been reluctant to issue album tracks as singles, the public's apparent lack of interest in Band on the Run led him to agree to the recommendations of Capitol's head of marketing, Al Coury, who had similarly pushed for the inclusion of "Helen Wheels" on the album's American release. McCartney, therefore, authorised single edits of the two A-sides taken from the album.

"Jet" was issued as a single in America on 28 January with "Mamunia" as the B-side, although "Let Me Roll It", which was the B-side of the UK release, replaced "Mamunia" on 15 February. The single's success provided new impetus for the album, which hit number 2 in the UK at the end of March and topped Billboard's listings on 13 April. Apple issued "Band on the Run" as a single in America on 8 April, backed by "Nineteen Hundred and Eighty-Five"; the UK release followed on 28 June, with the non-album instrumental "Zoo Gang" as the B-side. Due to the popularity of "Band on the Run", the album returned to number 1 on the Billboard chart on 8 June, when the single simultaneously topped the Hot 100. In Britain, the album finally hit number 1 on 27 July, and it stayed there for seven consecutive weeks. On the alternative UK listings compiled by Melody Maker, Band on the Run remained in the top ten from 26 January through 23 November 1974. During that time, its chart performance similarly reflected the popularity of the two singles, with the album spending three weeks at number 2 in April, and six weeks at number 1 throughout August and the first week of September.

The album topped the Billboard chart on three separate occasions during 1974, and was the top-selling album of that year in Australia and Canada. In Britain, it came second in the year-end standings, behind the compilation The Singles: 1969–1973 by the Carpenters. Through this success with Wings, McCartney established himself as the most commercially successful of the four former Beatles. Author Robert Rodriguez views the album's arrival at number 1 in America in April 1974 as the moment when McCartney usurped George Harrison as the "ex-Beatle Most Likely to Succeed", and the beginning of a period of public acclaim that reached its zenith with the Wings Over America Tour in 1976.

Band on the Run was eventually certified triple platinum by the Recording Industry Association of America (RIAA) and would go on to sell 9 million copies worldwide, becoming EMI's top-selling album of the 1970s in the UK. Its continued success through 1974 was also beneficial in allowing Wings to recruit a new guitarist and drummer, and to integrate them into the band before beginning new recordings. By 1984, it had sold 6 million copies, the highest amount for any ex-Beatle's work, at the time an equal to the Beatles' biggest success, Let it Be.

== Critical reception ==
Professional ratings
Review scores
Source	Rating
AllMusic	4.5/5 stars
Christgau's Record Guide	C+
Mojo	4/5 stars
MusicHound Rock	4/5
PopMatters	9/10
Record Collector	4/5 stars
Rolling Stone	5/5 stars
The Rolling Stone Album Guide	4/5 stars
Uncut	5/5 stars
Virgin Encyclopedia of Popular Music	4/5 stars

Upon its release, Band on the Run received mostly favourable reviews. Rodriguez writes that, after the disappointment of McCartney's post-Beatles work, "It was exactly the record fans and critics had long hoped he would make." Many described it as McCartney's best post-Beatles work yet.

In a combined review of Band on the Run and Starr's concurrently released Ringo album, Charles Shaar Murray of the NME wrote: "The ex-Beatle least likely to re-establish his credibility and lead the field has pulled it off with a positive master-stroke of an album entitled Band on the Run." In addition to praising McCartney for using synthesiser "like an instrument, and not like an electric whoopee cushion", Shaar Murray concluded: "Band on the Run is a great album. If anybody ever puts down McCartney in your presence, bust him in the snoot and play him this. He will thank you for it afterwards." Sounds magazine's Steve Peacock praised Band on the Run as a "brilliant and completely uninhibited album" that surpasses all of McCartney's post-Beatles work "in terms of creativity and awareness". Jon Landau of Rolling Stone described the album as, "with the possible exception of John Lennon's Plastic Ono Band, the finest record yet released by any of the four musicians who were once called the Beatles". Rolling Stone named Band on the Run one of the Best Albums of 1973.

Writing in The New York Times, Loraine Alterman considered the album to be "bursting with a great deal of compelling music even if the lyrics at times make as much sense as that cover photo". She admired the "fascinating range of sounds" offered in the title track, as well as the "lovely, romantic aura" of "Bluebird". While noting the importance of studio production to the overall effect, Alterman wrote: "McCartney has managed to make the complexities of multi-track recording sound as natural and fresh as tomorrow." In Melody Maker, Chris Welch described a "happy, almost exultant freedom" pulsating throughout the album, with the music being "open, unpressured and eminently satisfying". Disc's Rosemary Horide declared Band on the Run an "outstanding album, with a lot more of Paul's individual sounds than his previous albums have had". She placed it in her top three albums of the year.

One mixed review came from Robert Hilburn in the Los Angeles Times, who believed Band on the Run was better than McCartney's previous outings, even saying that "McCartney's vocals are bolder and his arrangements are more confident and tailored" than those records, but was ultimately disappointed in "what we all know McCartney should be able to provide". Similarly, The Philadelphia Inquirer's Jack Lloyd said that the songs were "not especially spectacular examples of creative songwriting at its best", believing that listeners would not want to "hear time and again". Writing for the Ottawa Citizen, Bill Provick called the album "too shallow", the writing "atrocious", and the instrumentation "competent" yet "antiseptic and strangely sterile". He also believed most of the songs did not warrant repeated listens. Village Voice critic Robert Christgau wrote in 1981: "I originally underrated what many consider McCartney's definitive post-Beatles statement, but not as much as its admirers overrate it. Pop masterpiece? This? Sure it's a relief after the vagaries of Wild Life and Red Rose Speedway." He praised the title track and the "Afro-soul" introduction to "Mamunia", calling them "the high points". Christgau ultimately awarded the album a C+ rating, indicating "a not disreputable performance, most likely a failed experiment or a pleasant piece of hackwork".

In a retrospective review for AllMusic, Al Campbell considered the arrangements and melodic hooks of the songs up to the caliber of McCartney's work in the Beatles, and concluded: "Though it lacks the emotional resonance of contemporaneous releases by John Lennon and George Harrison, McCartney's infallible instinct for popcraft overflows on this excellent release." Author John Blaney said that compared to the "opposing manifestations of taste and style" that hindered Wild Life and Red Rose Speedway, Band on the Run "fused [McCartney's] talents into a near perfect whole". The Rolling Stone review of the 30th Anniversary Deluxe Edition of the album said that "the real action still lies in the original LP's revved-up pleasures". Writing for Mojo magazine in 2011, John Harris included Band on the Run among "the trilogy of truly essential post-Beatles solo albums", along with Harrison's All Things Must Pass and Lennon's Plastic Ono Band. Band on the Run is generally considered one of McCartney's best solo records, and one of the best Beatle solo albums, with Paste magazine's Matt Mitchell deeming the best in 2023. He wrote on its 50th anniversary that it stands as a masterpiece that has "aged gracefully" and "remains a timeless document of our greatest pop songwriter's prime".

=== Rankings ===
In 2000, Q magazine placed Band on the Run at number 75 in its list of the "100 Greatest British Albums Ever". In 2012, it was voted 418th on Rolling Stone's revised list of "the 500 Greatest Albums of All Time". The following year, NME placed it at number 333 in a similar list. In 2013, it was inducted into the Grammy Hall of Fame. In 2022, Ultimate Classic Rock included it in its list of the best 100 rock albums of the 1970s. In 2023, Paste magazine ranked it the sixth best album of 1973. The album was also included in the 2018 edition of Robert Dimery's book 1001 Albums You Must Hear Before You Die.

== Track listing ==
All songs written by Paul and Linda McCartney, except "No Words" (written by Paul McCartney and Denny Laine).

Side one

1. "Band on the Run" – 5:12
2. "Jet" – 4:09
3. "Bluebird" – 3:23
4. "Mrs. Vandebilt" – 4:40
5. "Let Me Roll It" – 4:51

Side two

1. "Mamunia" – 4:51
2. "No Words" – 2:35
3. "Helen Wheels" – 3:45 (US version and select CD reissues)
4. "Picasso's Last Words (Drink to Me)" – 5:49
5. "Nineteen Hundred and Eighty-Five" – 5:28

== Reissues ==
Band on the Run was issued on CD on 29 February 1984 in the US by Columbia Records, with a reissue by Capitol on 1 December 1988. In the UK, EMI issued it on CD on 4 February 1985. In 1993, Band on the Run was remastered and reissued on CD as part of The Paul McCartney Collection series, with "Helen Wheels" and its B-side, "Country Dreamer", as bonus tracks.

=== 25th anniversary edition ===
In 1999, Band on the Run: 25th Anniversary Edition, a special extended edition of the album, was released to coincide with twenty-five years after when, after a slow start, sales of the album began to take off in March 1974. On this version, "Helen Wheels" appeared as track 8, between "No Words" and "Picasso's Last Words (Drink to Me)", as it had been positioned on the original US release. The package includes liner notes written by historian Mark Lewisohn, and an extra disc of live renditions of songs from the album throughout the years, as well as brief new renditions by McCartney. Spoken testimonials are also included from McCartney himself, the late Linda (to whom this retrospective release is dedicated), Laine, Dustin Hoffman (the inspiration behind the writing of "Picasso's Last Words"), and the celebrity faces on the cover (including James Coburn, who was in Britain to film The Internecine Project (1974) when the picture for the album cover was taken, and Christopher Lee).

=== Archive Collection ===
The Paul McCartney Archive Collection series started with Band on the Run, released on 2 November 2010. The Archive Collection was administered by Hear Music and Concord Music Group and the album was released in multiple formats: a single remastered CD version of the original UK album (excluding "Helen Wheels" from the track listing), a 2-disc vinyl LP version with the remastered album and a selection of bonus audio materials, a 2CD/DVD edition including a collection of bonus materials in addition to the original album, a 2CD/2DVD edition sold only at Best Buy with additional bonus materials on the second DVD, a 3CD/DVD Deluxe Edition with the additional bonus materials in the other versions and an audio documentary originally produced for the album's 25th anniversary release and a 120-page hardbound book containing photos by Linda McCartney and Clive Arrowsmith, a history of the album, and additional materials. Within the Deluxe Edition was additional included a High Resolution 24-bit 96 kHz (with no dynamic range compression) download of the audio content released for the Archive Collection editions. The Archive Collection reissue won the Grammy Award for Best Historical Album at the 54th Annual Grammy Awards in 2012.

In promotion of the Archive Collection edition, a Record Store Day 2010-exclusive vinyl single of "Band on the Run" backed with "Nineteen Hundred and Eighty-Five" was also released.

Disc 2: Bonus tracks (special, vinyl, and deluxe editions)
No.	Title	Length
1.	"Helen Wheels" (non-album single)	3:46
2.	"Country Dreamer" (B-side to "Helen Wheels")	3:08
3.	"Bluebird" (from One Hand Clapping)	3:27
4.	"Jet" (from One Hand Clapping)	3:56
5.	"Let Me Roll It" (from One Hand Clapping)	4:23
6.	"Band on the Run" (from One Hand Clapping)	5:13
7.	"Nineteen Hundred and Eighty-Five" (from One Hand Clapping)	5:58
8.	"Country Dreamer" (from One Hand Clapping)	2:18
9.	"Zoo Gang" (B-side to "Band on the Run")	2:01
Total length:		34:16

Disc 3 (deluxe edition)

This disc contains an audio documentary of the album, originally released in 1999 as Disc 2 of the 25th Anniversary Edition reissue.

DVD (special and deluxe editions)

1. "Band on the Run" music video
2. "Mamunia" music video
3. Album promo
4. "Helen Wheels" music video
5. Wings in Lagos
6. Osterley Park
7. One Hand Clapping
  - Track listing:
  1. One Hand Clapping Theme
  2. "Jet"
  3. "Soily"
  4. "C Moon"
  5. "Little Woman Love"
  6. "Maybe I'm Amazed"
  7. "My Love"
  8. "Bluebird"
  9. "Let's Love"
  10. "All of You"
  11. "I'll Give You a Ring"
  12. "Band on the Run"
  13. "Live and Let Die"
  14. "Nineteen Hundred and Eighty-Five"
  15. "Baby Face"

Bonus DVD (Special edition sold only at Best Buy)
No.	Title	Length
1.	"Band on the Run 2010 EPK"
2.	"Jet" (from Good Evening New York City)
3.	"Mrs. Vandebilt" (from Good Evening New York City)
4.	"Band on the Run" (from Good Evening New York City)

Download only (pre-order bonus tracks on paulmccartney.com)

1. "No Words" (live in Glasgow) – 2:56
2. "Band on the Run" (live in Glasgow) – 6:57

=== 50th anniversary edition ===
A 50th anniversary edition of the album was released on 2 February 2024. The US version of the album, with "Helen Wheels" included, was "cut at half speed using a high-resolution transfer of the original master tapes from 1973 at Abbey Road Studios, London". Additionally, in promotion of the anniversary, "a second LP of previously unreleased "underdubbed" mixes of the songs" was released. The "underdubbed" mixes are rough mixes prepared by engineer Geoff Emerick on 14 October 1973, before the final mixes with Tony Visconti's orchestrations added to the tracks. The 50th anniversary also included streaming versions of the "Underdubbed Mixes" and a Dolby Atmos mix by Giles Martin and Steve Orchard of the full US version of the album.

Reviewing the 50th anniversary edition, Stephen Thomas Erlewine rated it a 9.0/10 in Pitchfork. He said that the "underdubbed" mixes have "instructive value"; the tracks feel incomplete without vocals and Tony Visconti's orchestrations, but "nevertheless capture how Wings interacted as a band". He also noted how the mixes emphasise the importance of Linda McCartney and Laine's contributions. He ultimately described Band on the Run as Paul McCartney's "most consequential post-Beatles record, if not necessarily his best".

== Personnel ==
According to Bruce Spizer:

Wings

- Paul McCartney – lead and backing vocals, bass, acoustic and electric guitars, piano, keyboards, drums, percussion
- Linda McCartney – harmony and backing vocals, organ, keyboards, percussion
- Denny Laine – harmony and backing vocals, co-lead vocals ("No Words" and "Picasso's Last Words"), acoustic and electric guitars, percussion

Additional personnel

- Howie Casey – saxophone on "Jet", "Bluebird", and "Mrs. Vandebilt"
- Ginger Baker – percussion on "Picasso's Last Words"
- Remi Kabaka – percussion on "Bluebird"
- Ian Horne & Trevor Jones (two of Wings' roadies) – backing vocals on "No Words"
- 3 uncredited session musicians – saxophones on "Jet"
- Tony Visconti – orchestrations
- Geoff Emerick – sound engineer

== Charts ==
=== Original release ===
Chart (1973–1975)	Peak position
Australian Kent Music Report	1
Belgium Albums Chart	4
Canadian RPM Albums Chart	1
Dutch Mega Albums Chart	5
Japanese Oricon LPs Chart	11
Norwegian VG-lista Albums Chart	1
Spanish Albums Chart	1
Swedish Albums Chart	5
UK Albums Chart	1
US Billboard Top LPs & Tape	1
West German Media Control Albums Chart	15

=== 1999 reissue ===
Chart (1999)	Peak position
Japanese Albums Chart	56
UK Albums Chart	69
US Top Pop Catalog Albums	1

=== 2010 reissue ===
Chart (2010)	Peak position
Belgian Albums Chart (Flanders)	89
Belgian Albums Chart (Wallonia)	96
Dutch Albums Chart	34
European Top 100 Albums	46
Japanese Albums Chart	25
Spanish Albums Chart	47
UK Albums Chart	17
US Top Pop Catalog Albums	3
US Billboard 200	29

=== 2024 reissue ===
Chart (2024)	Peak position
Austrian Albums (Ö3 Austria)	29
Swiss Albums (Schweizer Hitparade)	22

=== Monthly charts ===
Monthly chart performance for Band on the Run
Chart (1978)	Peak position
Soviet Albums (MK)	1

=== Year-end charts ===
Chart (1974)	Position
Australian Kent Music Report	1
Canadian Albums Chart	1
German Albums (Offizielle Top 100)	36
UK Albums Chart	2
US Billboard Year-End	3

Chart (1975)	Position
Australian Kent Music Report	14

1978 year-end chart performance for Band on the Run
Chart (1978)	Position
Soviet Albums (MK)	4

=== Certifications ===
Region	Certification	Certified units/sales
France (SNEP)	Gold	100,000^{*}
United Kingdom (BPI)	Platinum	300,000^{^}
United Kingdom (BPI) Remastered Edition	Gold	100,000^{^}
United States (RIAA)	3× Platinum	3,000,000^{^}
^{*} Sales figures based on certification alone.^{^} Shipments figures based on certification alone.
