= Helen Wheels =

Single by Paul McCartney and Wings
- B-side: "Country Dreamer"
- Released: 26 October 1973
- Recorded: August–September 1973
- Studio: EMI, Lagos, Nigeria
- Genre: Glam rock, power pop
- Length: 3:44
- Label: Apple
- Songwriters: Paul McCartney, Linda McCartney
- Producer: Paul McCartney

Wings singles chronology
"Live and Let Die" (1973)	"Helen Wheels" (1973)	"Bluebird" (1974)

Music video
- "Helen Wheels" on YouTube

"Helen Wheels" is a song by the English-American rock band Paul McCartney and Wings. The song was named after Paul and Linda McCartney's Land Rover, a pun on "Hell on Wheels".

== Recording ==
The song was recorded at the EMI Studios in Lagos, Nigeria, with Geoff Emerick engineering. Recently surfaced tapes show that the released version was take 3.

== Release ==
The song was released as a single (with "Country Dreamer" on the B-side) prior to Band on the Run and was not included on the British release of the album. However, Capitol Records vice president of promotion Al Coury persuaded McCartney to include it on the American release. The song peaked at number 10 in the US chart on 12 January 1974 and at number 12 in the UK chart.

In the book Paul McCartney In His Own Words published in 1976, McCartney said:

"Helen Wheels is our Land Rover. It's a name we gave to our Land Rover, which is a trusted vehicle that gets us around Scotland. It takes us up to the Shetland Islands and down to London. The song starts off in Glasgow, and it goes past Carlisle, goes to Kendal, Liverpool, Birmingham and London. It's the route coming down from our Scottish farm to London, so it's really the story of the trip down. Little images along the way. Liverpool is on the West coast of England, so that is all that means."

The music video was directed by Michael Lindsay-Hogg (who also directed the Beatles' final movie Let it Be) and shows McCartney singing and playing his left-handed Rickenbacker 4001 bass, Linda playing a Minimoog synthesizer and singing backing vocals, Denny Laine playing his Fender Telecaster Thinline and singing backing vocals while additional footage shows McCartney doubling on drums and lead guitar in place of departed members Denny Seiwell and Henry McCullough, both of whom quit the band prior to the sessions for Band on the Run, and the trio in a car.

Billboard described "Helen Wheels" as a "driving rock tune" with a "catchy chorus". Cash Box called it "a savage rocker from a band that has become more proficient at rock with each outing." Record World predicted that this "rock and rolling number should drive to number one in a matter of weeks."

"Helen Wheels" was included on the compilation albums Wingspan: Hits and History in 2001 and the deluxe edition of Wings in 2025. It was also included on The 7" Singles Box in 2022.

== Cover versions ==
The song was covered by Def Leppard on the album The Art of McCartney in 2014.

== Personnel ==
According to The Paul McCartney Project:

- Paul McCartney – lead vocals, electric guitar, bass guitar, drums
- Linda McCartney – backing vocals, synthesiser
- Denny Laine – backing vocals, electric guitar

== Charts ==
=== Weekly charts ===
Chart (1973–1974)	Peak position
Canada Top Singles (RPM)	4
Japan (Oricon)	56
US Billboard Hot 100	10
