= Mrs. Vandebilt =

1974 single by Wings

Single by Paul McCartney and Wings

from the album Band on the Run
- B-side: "Bluebird"
- Released: January 1974
- Recorded: September 1973
- Studio: EMI Studios, Lagos, Nigeria
- Genre: Rock
- Length: 4:38
- Label: Apple
- Songwriters: Paul McCartney; Linda McCartney
- Producer: Paul McCartney

Wings singles chronology
"Helen Wheels" (1973)	"Mrs. Vandebilt" (1974)	"Jet" (1974)

"Mrs. Vandebilt" is a song by the British–American rock band Paul McCartney and Wings from the album Band on the Run. The track was not issued as a single in the UK or US, but was a single in Continental Europe and Australia. On the New Zealand Listener charts, it reached number 9.

== Writing and recording ==
The opening lines of the song are taken from the catchphrase of English music hall performer Charlie Chester. Chester's catchphrase was "Down in the jungle living in a tent, better than a prefab no rent"; the lyrics subsequently changed to "Down in the jungle living in a tent, You don't use money you don't pay rent".

Howie Casey is featured with a saxophone solo.

The song was recorded during the album sessions in Lagos, Nigeria. The studio suffered a power outage during the session, but the recording continued with backup generators. Additional overdubs were later done in London.

The forced laughter that closed "Mrs. Vandebilt" was influenced by Charlie Chester's effects on his studio audience. Wings added more laughter in London's AIR Studios after returning from Lagos, Nigeria. McCartney recalled: "The laughing? It started off in Africa. We were doing sort of daft laughs at the end. When we got back we eventually overdubbed this crowd of people who were laughing. It was great listening to the tapes, trying to select the little bit of laughter that we would use. Most of it was us, but we need a little bit to cushion it up. It was great listening to a roomful of people laughing in stereo. They were getting into all these laughing bits, and we were on the floor."

== Later releases ==
"Mrs. Vandebilt" was later released on the compilation album Pure McCartney in 2016. It was also featured on The 7" Singles Box in 2022.

== Live performances ==
McCartney had not played the song live until a free concert on 14 June 2008 in Kyiv, Ukraine, on account of it receiving the most requests in a web poll. McCartney played the song in his concert for Quebec City, and then at Yarkon Park in Tel Aviv, Israel, on 25 September 2008, his first show in Israel. It became a fixture in his setlist, as he also performed the song in Halifax, the first show of his 2009 summer tour, as well as in his three July 2009 performances at the Citi Field in New York City. In addition, the song was featured in his Up and Coming Tour in 2010, his On the Run Tour in 2011–12, and most of his Out There! Tour in 2013. It was dropped for the performances in Japan at the end of the latter tour in November 2013.

== Use in sampling ==
- The first sample of the "ho, hey ho" bit actually occurs on the B-side of the Band on the Run album itself, at the end of the track "Picasso's Last Words (Drink to Me)".
- The song's introduction is also sampled in a Big Boi remix titled "Mrs. Vandebilt Told Me", released online in 2014.

== Personnel ==
According to Bruce Spizer:

- Paul McCartney – lead vocals, bass guitar, drums, guitar
- Linda McCartney – backing vocals, electric piano
- Denny Laine – guitar, backing vocals
- Howie Casey – saxophone
