= Paul McCartney Archive Collection =

Paul McCartney reissue campaign

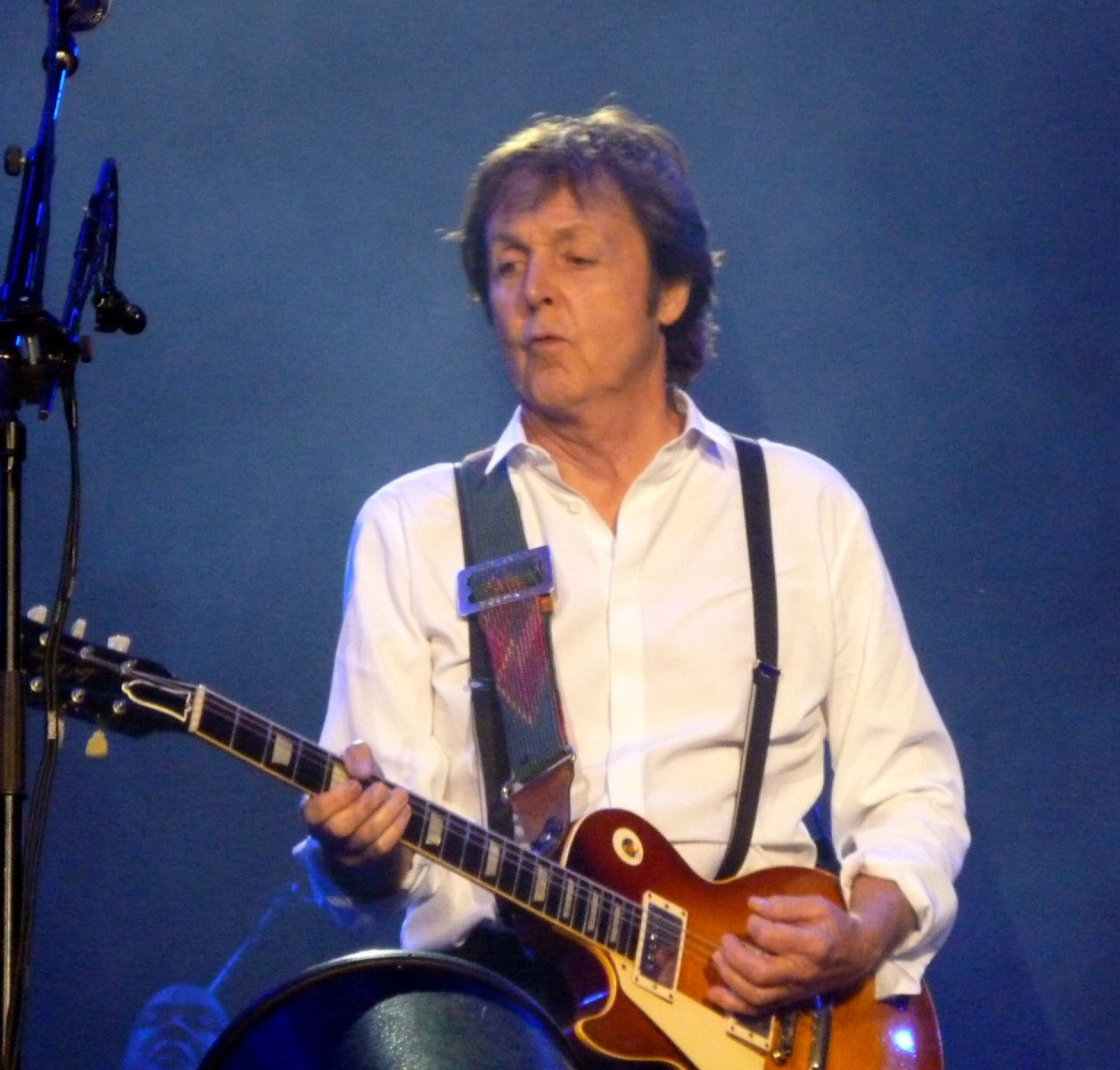
McCartney performing in 2010

The Paul McCartney Archive Collection is a project to remaster and reissue Paul McCartney's solo catalogue, including various albums released with Wings. These editions feature deluxe packaging and bonus rare tracks. Thus far, there have been 14 releases since the project began in 2010 (seven solo albums, six Wings albums, and one new Wings live album of previously unreleased material). They are overseen by McCartney himself and remastered at Abbey Road Studios. Albums reissued in this project are visually marked by a white stripe along the left side of the album cover that reads "Paul McCartney Archive Collection" and a copy of McCartney's signature.

The albums are typically released in a variety of formats: a "standard" edition that contains the original album digitally remastered on one CD; a "special" edition which contains additional discs of bonus tracks; and a "deluxe" edition which comes with extra features like bonus CDs or DVDs of unreleased material packaged in a hard-bound book. Some releases contain booklets, rare photos, interviews, artwork, promotional video clips, or documentaries. The "special" editions of the albums were also released as double LPs on 180-gram "audiophile vinyl", with the original album on one record and bonus material on the second. The records also come with a download card for MP3 versions of all tracks included. The special editions of the albums are available on streaming services worldwide. As of 2026, the last release in the series was in 2020.

== Releases ==
Below is a list of albums that have been reissued so far.

	Album	Original release date	Archive reissue date
1	Band on the Run	5 December 1973	1 November 2010
2	McCartney	17 April 1970	13 June 2011
3	McCartney II	16 May 1980	13 June 2011
4	Ram	17 May 1971	21 May 2012
5	Wings over America	10 December 1976	27 May 2013
6	Venus and Mars	27 May 1975	23 September 2014
7	Wings at the Speed of Sound	25 March 1976	23 September 2014
8	Tug of War	26 April 1982	2 October 2015
9	Pipes of Peace	17 October 1983	2 October 2015
10	Flowers in the Dirt	5 June 1989	24 March 2017
11	Wild Life	7 December 1971	7 December 2018
12	Red Rose Speedway	4 May 1973	7 December 2018
-	Wings 1971–73	Previously unreleased	7 December 2018
13	Flaming Pie	5 May 1997	31 July 2020

== Reception ==
The Paul McCartney Archive Collection received two Grammy Awards.

Year	Nominee / work	Award	Result
2012	Band on the Run	Best Historical Album	Won
2013	Ram	Best Historical Album	Nominated
2013	Ram	Best Boxed or Special Limited Edition Package	Nominated
2014	Wings over America	Best Boxed or Special Limited Edition Package	Won
2017	Tug of War	Best Boxed or Special Limited Edition Package	Nominated
2021	Flaming Pie	Best Boxed or Special Limited Edition Package	Nominated
