= Bluebird (Paul McCartney and Wings song) =

Single by Paul McCartney and Wings

from the album Band on the Run
- A-side: "Mrs Vandebilt"
- Released: 28 January 1974
- Recorded: September 1973
- Studio: AIR Studios, London
- Genre: Pop; jazz pop; bossa nova
- Length: 3:24
- Label: Apple
- Songwriters: Paul McCartney; Linda McCartney
- Producer: Paul McCartney

Wings singles chronology
"Helen Wheels" (1973)	"Bluebird" (1974)	"Jet" (1974)

Official audio
- "Bluebird" (2010 Remaster) on YouTube

"Bluebird" is a song written by Paul and Linda McCartney and originally performed by the British rock band Wings, released on their 1973 album Band on the Run. According to author John Blaney, it was written during a vacation in Jamaica. However, author Vincent Benitez claims the song was written as early as 1970 or 1971, noting that Paul and Linda sang the song during a live interview in New York City in 1971. In Continental Europe it was also released as the B-side of the "Mrs. Vandebilt" single.

== Recording and music ==
"Bluebird" was reportedly composed by McCartney in 1971, during his holiday in Jamaica. Although much of the Band on the Run album was recorded in Lagos, Nigeria in August and September 1973, "Bluebird" was completed later in 1973 at AIR Studios in London. The percussionist on the song, Remi Kabaka, was from Lagos but happened to be in London when the song was being recorded. One highlight of the song is a saxophone solo played by session musician Howie Casey. Casey repeated his solo during the Wings Over the World tour in 1975 and 1976. Other musical elements of the song include acoustic guitars and calypso-like percussion.

== Lyrics and chords ==
In the lyrics, Paul McCartney compares himself in love to a bluebird. The opening lyrics are:

Late at night when the wind is still
I'll come flying through your door
And you’ll know what love is for
I'm a bluebird

Blaney interprets the bluebird as "a metaphor for the transcendent power of love and the liberation of the human spirit from mental and physical bondage". Benitez regards the bluebird as a metaphor for love itself - love that is the only source of transcendent freedom. The song describes the singer's revitalization after having been upset at the beginning of the song. Jon Landau describes the song as "a simple love song" but sees in its "flying" motif a continuation of the theme of escape that runs throughout the Band on the Run album. The singer tells his lover that when he, as a bluebird, kisses her she can also become a bluebird, at which point they become absolutely free.

The song is closest to the key of F major, but is not in concert pitch due to the way the guitars are tuned. The refrain is simply a rhythmic chant based on the phrase "I'm a Bluebird" sung by McCartney with Linda and Denny Laine providing harmony. Benitez states about the music that "the harmonic schemes of verse and chorus strongly suggest that the text of each verse raises a question, only to be answered by each chorus through its exclamations of being a bluebird."

== Reception ==
Donald Guarisco of AllMusic describes "Bluebird" as "a simple bit of acoustic pop that overflows with hooks thanks to a slick arrangement" and "a delightful, breezy pop tune". NME critics Roy Carr and Tony Tyler commented that McCartney's "lightweight touch ... works superbly on 'Bluebird'" and likened it to "Blackbird" from the Beatles' self-titled double album (also known as the "White Album").

Paul McCartney & Wings (with Joe English and Jimmy McCulloch) recorded "Bluebird" along with an apology to Japanese fans for their being unable to tour in Japan after he was denied entry into the country. An incomplete version of the video was included with the 25th Anniversary Edition of Band on the Run, and a longer version (including the apology) was included on the 2001 documentary Wingspan – An Intimate Portrait.

In 2017 Rolling Stone magazine ranked "Bluebird" as McCartney's 14th greatest post-Beatles song, stating that it "features a bittersweet melody only McCartney could have written, carried along by guitar that lilts like Brazilian bossa nova and soft-touch percussion from Nigerian instrumentalist Remi Kabaka".

== Other releases ==
"Bluebird" was released on the compilation albums Wingspan: Hits and History in 2001 and the deluxe edition of Wings in 2025. It was also included on The 7" Singles Box in 2022. A different live studio take, recorded on 27 August 1974 at EMI Studios in London, was first released on the Paul McCartney Archive Collection edition of Band on the Run in 2010, and later on One Hand Clapping in 2024.

== Personnel ==
According to the author Luca Perasi:

Musicians

- Paul McCartney – lead and backing vocals, acoustic guitar, bass guitar, drums
- Linda McCartney – backing vocals
- Denny Laine – backing vocals, acoustic guitar
- Howie Casey – saxophone
- Remi Kabaka – percussion

Technical

- Paul McCartney – producer
- Geoff Emerick – engineer

Note: Perasi is unsure who played percussion and drums.
