= Jet (song) =

1973 single by Paul McCartney and Wings

- German single sleeve

Single by Paul McCartney and Wings

from the album Band on the Run
- B-side: "Let Me Roll It"; "Mamunia" (first US pressing)
- Released: 28 January 1974 (US); 15 February 1974 (UK)
- Recorded: September 1973
- Studio: EMI, London
- Genre: Glam rock; hard rock; pop rock; power pop
- Length: 4:07 (album version); 2:50 (promo edit)
- Label: Apple
- Songwriters: Paul McCartney; Linda McCartney
- Producer: Paul McCartney

Wings singles chronology
"Mrs. Vandebilt" (1974)	"Jet" (1974)	"Band on the Run" (1974)

Alternative covers
- Swedish cover

Official audio
- "Jet" (Remastered 2010) on YouTube

"Jet" is a song by Paul McCartney and Wings from their third studio album Band on the Run (1973). It was the first British and American single to be released from the album.

The song peaked at No. 7 on the British and American charts on 30 March 1974, also charting in multiple countries in Europe. It has since been released on numerous compilation albums.

== Background ==
Reviewers have reported that the song's title was inspired by the McCartneys' Labrador Retriever dog named "Jet". McCartney has substantiated this claim:

We've got a Labrador puppy who is a runt, the runt of a litter. We bought her along a roadside in a little pet shop, out in the country one day. She was a bit of a wild dog, a wild girl who wouldn't stay in. We have a big wall around our house in London, and she wouldn't stay in, she always used to jump the wall. She'd go out on the town for the evening, like Lady and the Tramp. She must have met up with some big black Labrador or something. She came back one day pregnant. She proceeded to walk into the garage and have this litter ... Seven little black puppies, perfect little black Labradors, and she's not black, she's tan. So we worked out it must have been a black Labrador. What we do is if either of the dogs we have has a litter, we try to keep them for the puppy stage, so we get the best bit of them, and then when they get a bit unmanageable we ask people if they want to have a puppy. So Jet was one of the puppies. We give them all names. We've had some great names, there was one puppy called Golden Molasses. I rather like that. Then there was one called Brown Megs, named after a Capitol executive. They've all gone now. The people change the names if they don't like them.

This was also confirmed by an interview with Paul Gambaccini, broadcast on BBC Radio in December 1978.

However, in a 2010 interview on the UK television channel ITV1 for the programme Wings: Band on the Run (to promote the November 2010 CD/DVD re-release of the album), McCartney said that Jet was the name of a pony he had owned, although many of the lyrics bore little relation to the subject; indeed, the true meaning of the lyrics has defied all attempts at decryption.

I make up so much stuff. It means something to me when I do it, and it means something to the record buyer, but if I'm asked to analyze it I can't really explain what it is. 'Suffragette' was crazy enough to work. It sounded silly, so I liked it.

— –Paul McCartney, Paul McCartney: In His Own Words.

In a 2017 interview on Australian radio station Triple J for the segment Take 5, McCartney said that the song was actually about his experience meeting Linda's father:

There’s no telling where you'll get ideas from and we happened to name this little black puppy Jet. Again I was noodling around, looking for an idea and thought that's a good word 'Jet'. So, I wrote the song about that. Not about the puppy, just using the name. And now it's transformed into a sort of girl. It was kind of – a little bit about the experiences I'd had in marrying Linda. Her dad was a little old fashioned and I thought I was a little bit intimidated, as a lot of young guys can be meeting the father figure. And if the dad's really easy-going, it makes it easy. It wasn't bad but I was a bit intimidated, probably my fault as much as his. Anyway, the song starts to be about the sergeant major and it was basically my experience, roughly translated. I never do a song with the actual words that actually happen, because then that's like a news story. Oh Linda, I was going to see your dad and he was intimidating. A bit boring. So, I mask it and mould it into a song, something you can sing reasonably.

== Recording ==
Whereas most of the Band on the Run album was recorded in Lagos, Nigeria, "Jet" was recorded entirely at EMI Studios in London after the group's return (according to engineer Geoff Emerick in his book Here There and Everywhere). Instrumentation used in the song includes electric guitars, bass, Moog, drums, piano, horns and strings. The Moog is used for the bass line during the verse and is simply Linda holding the root note.

== Release and reception ==
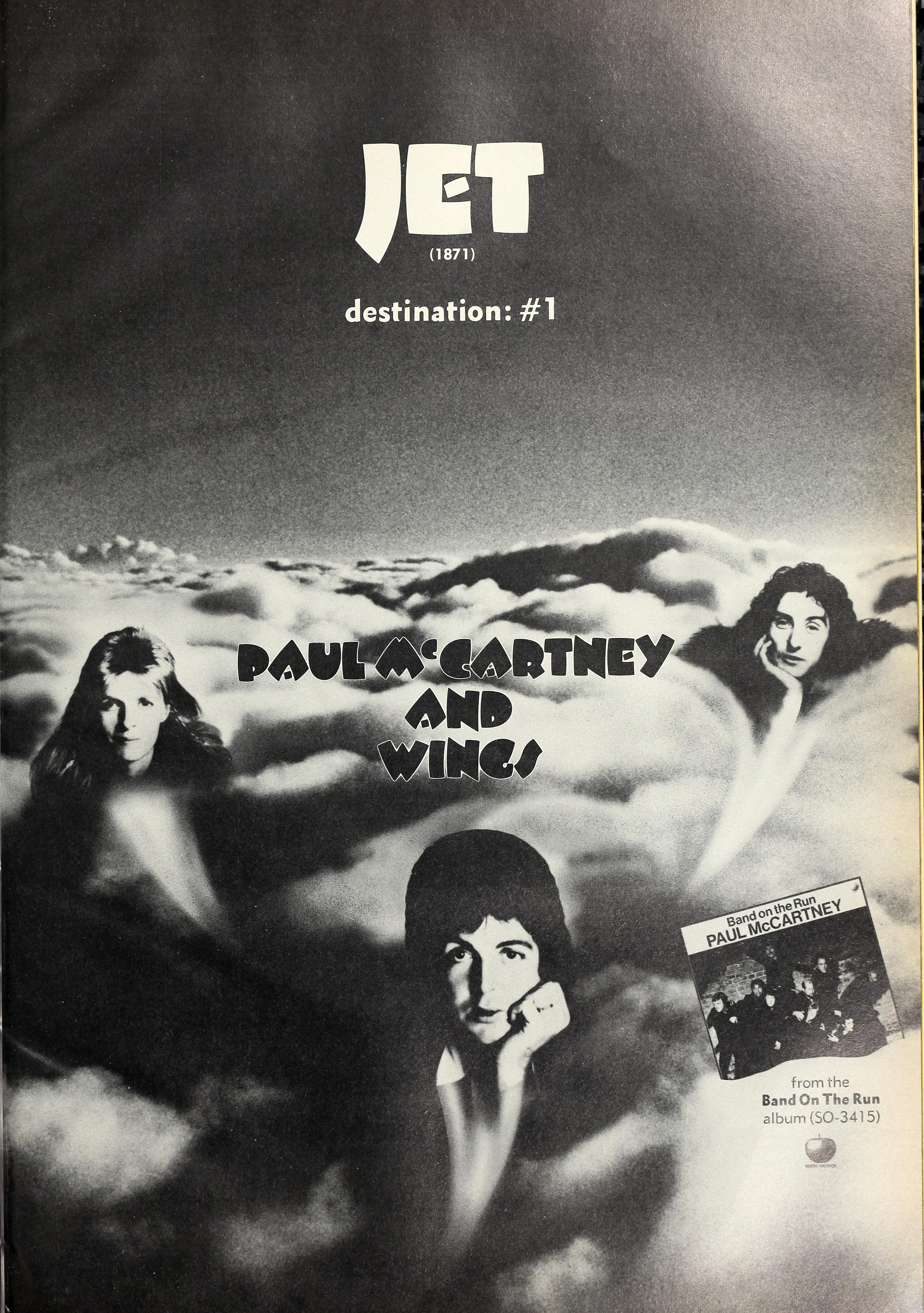
Cashbox advertisement, March 16, 1974

"Jet" was released as the debut single from Band on the Run in January 1974 (although in some countries, the non-UK/US single "Mrs. Vandebilt" was released first). McCartney initially opposed issuing "Jet" as a single, carrying on a practice from the Beatles where singles were usually non-album tracks. However, Capitol Records executive Al Coury persuaded McCartney to issue the single to help Band on the Run's stalled chart position at no. 13. McCartney also agreed to let Capitol edit the song's length down to maximize radio airplay, but asked that both the original and shortened versions be sent to radio DJs. The single was backed with "Let Me Roll It" in Britain. When first released in America, the single's B-side was "Mamunia", another track from Band on the Run, but it was soon replaced with the British B-side.

The single was a top 10 hit for Paul McCartney and Wings. It peaked at number 7 on both the British and American charts on 30 March 1974, and charted in multiple countries in Europe.

Prominent music critic Dave Marsh named the song number 793 in his list of the 1001 greatest singles ever made. He referred to it as a "grand pop confection" that represented the only time McCartney approached the "drive and density" of his tenure with the Beatles. Billboard said that the "guitar energy" and vocal performances generate "an outstanding production". Cash Box called it a "catchy number" with "distinctive guitar riffs", a "straightforward rock beat" and "provocative lyrics". Record World called it "an overpowering smash both vocally and instrumentally".

Paul McCartney was quoted in Clash magazine that the soft rock duo the Carpenters were fans of "Jet":

I remember Richard and Karen Carpenter ringing me up to tell me about 'Jet' – they were like the last people on Earth I thought who’d like 'Jet'! But they were like, 'Oh, great record, man!' So, you know, it was actually resonating with people.

The Australian rock band Jet drew their name from the song title.

=== Other releases ===
"Jet" has since been released on multiple compilation albums, including Wings Greatest (1978), All the Best! (1987), Wingspan: Hits and History (2001), Pure McCartney (2016) and Wings. It was also included on The 7" Singles Box in 2022. A different live studio take, recorded on 28 August 1974 at EMI Studios in London, was first released on the Paul McCartney Archive Collection edition of Band on the Run in 2010, and later on One Hand Clapping in 2024.

== Personnel ==
According to the author Luca Perasi:

Musicians

- Paul McCartney – lead and backing vocals, electric guitar, bass guitar, drums, piano
- Linda McCartney – backing vocals, Moog synthesiser
- Denny Laine – backing vocals, electric guitar
- Howie Casey – saxophone
- Phil Kenzie – saxophone
- Dave Coxhill – saxophone
- Jeff Daly – saxophone
- Beaux Cox Orchestra – orchestra

Technical

- Paul McCartney – producer
- Geoff Emerick – engineer

== Charts ==
=== Weekly charts ===
Chart (1974)	Peak position
Belgium (Ultratop 50 Flanders)	26
Canada Top Singles (RPM)	5
Germany (GfK)	6
Japan (Oricon)	39
Netherlands (Dutch Top 40)	10
New Zealand (Listener)	2
Norway (VG-lista)	9
South Africa (Springbok)	8
UK Singles (Official Charts Company)	7
US Billboard Hot 100	7
US Cash Box Top 100	5

=== Year-end charts ===
Chart (1974)	Position
Canada	38
US Billboard Hot 100	77
US Cash Box	77
