= Widmer =

Widmer is a surname. Notable people with the surname include:

- Albert Widmer, inventor of 8b/10b encoding
- Arthur Widmer (1914–2006), American film special effects pioneer
- Carolyn Ladd Widmer (1902–1991), academic dean at the University of Connecticut
- Daniel Widmer, Swiss curler
- Edward L. Widmer (born 1963), historian, speechwriter, and librarian
- Eric Widmer (1940–2025), American scholar and educator
- Gabrielle Oberhänsli-Widmer (born 1957), Professor of Jewish studies at the University of Freiburg
- Gianni Widmer (1892–1971), flight pioneer
- Jacob Zachery Widmer, American-Filipino newspaper editor and writer for the Daily Bugle
- Jean Widmer (1929–2026), Swiss-French graphic designer
- Kurt Widmer (1940–2023), Swiss baritone
- Marilena Widmer (born 1997), Swiss footballer
- Marise Widmer, American rower
- Markus Widmer, Swiss curler
- Pierre Widmer (1912–1999), French Mennonite pastor
- Samuel Widmer (1948–2017) Swiss physician, psychiatrist, psychotherapist and author
- Sigmund Widmer (1919–2003), Swiss politician
- Silvan Widmer (born 1993), Swiss footballer

== See also ==
- Widmer Brothers Brewery, an American brewery founded in 1984 in Portland, Oregon by brothers Kurt and Rob Widmer
- Wiedmer
