= Bip Bop =

Song by Wings

from the album Wild Life
- Released: 7 December 1971
- Recorded: 24 and 30 July 1971
- Length: 4:14
- Label: Apple
- Songwriters: Paul McCartney; Linda McCartney
- Producer: Paul McCartney

"Bip Bop" is a song by the English-American rock band Wings, released as the second track on their debut album Wild Life (1971).

== Background and composition ==
"Bip Bop" began as a demo Paul McCartney recorded in 1970, as he was quoted by Keith Badman saying: "I had a very simple thing going on with my guitar, my bass string, just plonking on it, a simple blues thing. We are very interested in playing chunky music, music that doesn’t particularly say anything. We’re not too serious; we like to have a bit of a bop." In June 1971, the McCartneys were filmed playing a selection of different songs including "Bip Bop".

== Recording and production ==
Proper recording of "Bip Bop" began on 24 July and consisted of Paul McCartney on electric guitar, Denny Laine on bass, Denny Seiwell on drums and Linda McCartney on tambourine, with Paul giving one instruction to engineer Tony Clark; to "keep it flat and funky", two takes of the song were done with the second selected as best. The McCartneys returned to the studio to overdub lead and harmony vocals on 30 July with no issue, as they had already been performing the song for months at High Park Farm. A by-product of a session on a Saturday between 2 and 15 October was a quick short fingerpicking guitar test recording done by Paul, which was titled "Bip Bop Link". Mixing of the song was done on 15 October. The song is primarily in the key of E minor and consists of only a verse and refrain.

== Release and reception ==
"Bip Bop" was released on Wings' debut album Wild Life (1971), and sequenced as the second track on the album, with "Bip Bop Link" included as the seventh track, but not named until compact disc reissues of the album. It was also released as a single in Turkey, backed with "Love Is Strange" (Ironically, the album version of the latter was used rather than the edit intended for a worldwide single release). In a review for Rolling Stone, John Mendelsohn called it "quite enjoyable Merle Travis style guitar-pickin’ hoedown" Authors Chip Madinger and Mark Easter note that "Paul's statement, "it's the one our baby likes," says everything that needs to be said about this particular effort." Paul McCartney himself has many times called it the worst song he ever wrote. In a review for Goldmine magazine, John M. Borack writes: "the silly-yet-tuneful "Bip Bop," sung in a throaty, upper register, half-whisper was described by McCartney years after the fact as "another little thing that’s not really got a lot of lyrical strength." Billboard writer Morgan Enos wrote that it "sounds less like a fey trifle than a hypnotic earworm." Author John Blaney states that "while ['Bip Bop'] has the advantage of proper lyrics, it still fails to match the work McCartney was capable of producing."

"Bip Bop" was featured on the deluxe edition of the 2016 compilation album Pure McCartney. Its inclusion was questioned by PopMatters' Chris Gerard and Goldmine's John Borack, the former of whom wondered why it was chosen over the Wild Life "classics" "Tomorrow" and "Dear Friend".

== Personnel ==
According to authors Allan Kozinn and Adrian Sinclair:

- Paul McCartney – electric guitar, lead and harmony vocals
- Linda McCartney – tambourine, harmony vocals
- Denny Laine – bass
- Denny Seiwell – drums

== Charts ==
Weekly chart performance
Chart (1972)	Peak position
Belgium (Ultratop 50 Wallonia)	45
