= Dear Friend =

Dear Friend may refer to:

- Dear Friend (TV program), Philippine television drama anthology series.
- Dear Friend (1949 film), Austrian film by Rudolf Steinboeck
- Dear Friend (2022 film), Indian film
- "Dear Friend", a song written by Jerry Bock & Sheldon Harnick released in 1964
- "Dear Friend", a song by Paul McCartney and Wings from Wild Life
- "Dear Friend", a song by Ronnie Milsap from Out Where the Bright Lights Are Glowing
- "Dear Friend", a 1990 song by Akina Nakamori
- "Dear Friend", a 2006 song by Sowelu
- "Dear Friend", a song by Union from The Blue Room
