= Wild Life (Wings song) =

Song by Wings

from the album Wild Life
- Released: 7 December 1971
- Recorded: 26 and 30 July, 2 October 1971
- Genre: Rock
- Length: 6:41
- Label: Apple
- Songwriters: Paul McCartney; Linda McCartney
- Producer: Paul McCartney

Licensed audio
- "Wild Life" on YouTube

"Wild Life" is a song by the English rock band Wings, released as the fourth track on their debut album Wild Life (1971). Paul McCartney penned the song based on his trip to an African game reserve, where he read a sign advising drivers that animals have the right of way. He uses the metaphor of wildlife to sing about politics, the first time McCartney openly does so according to some writers. McCartney's wife and bandmate, Linda McCartney, played a three-chord part on electric keyboard. The song received mixed reviews from both contemporary and retrospective critics, many of whom compared it unfavorably to John Lennon's political tracks. Many have highlighted McCartney's shrill, fierce vocal performance.

== Background and composition ==
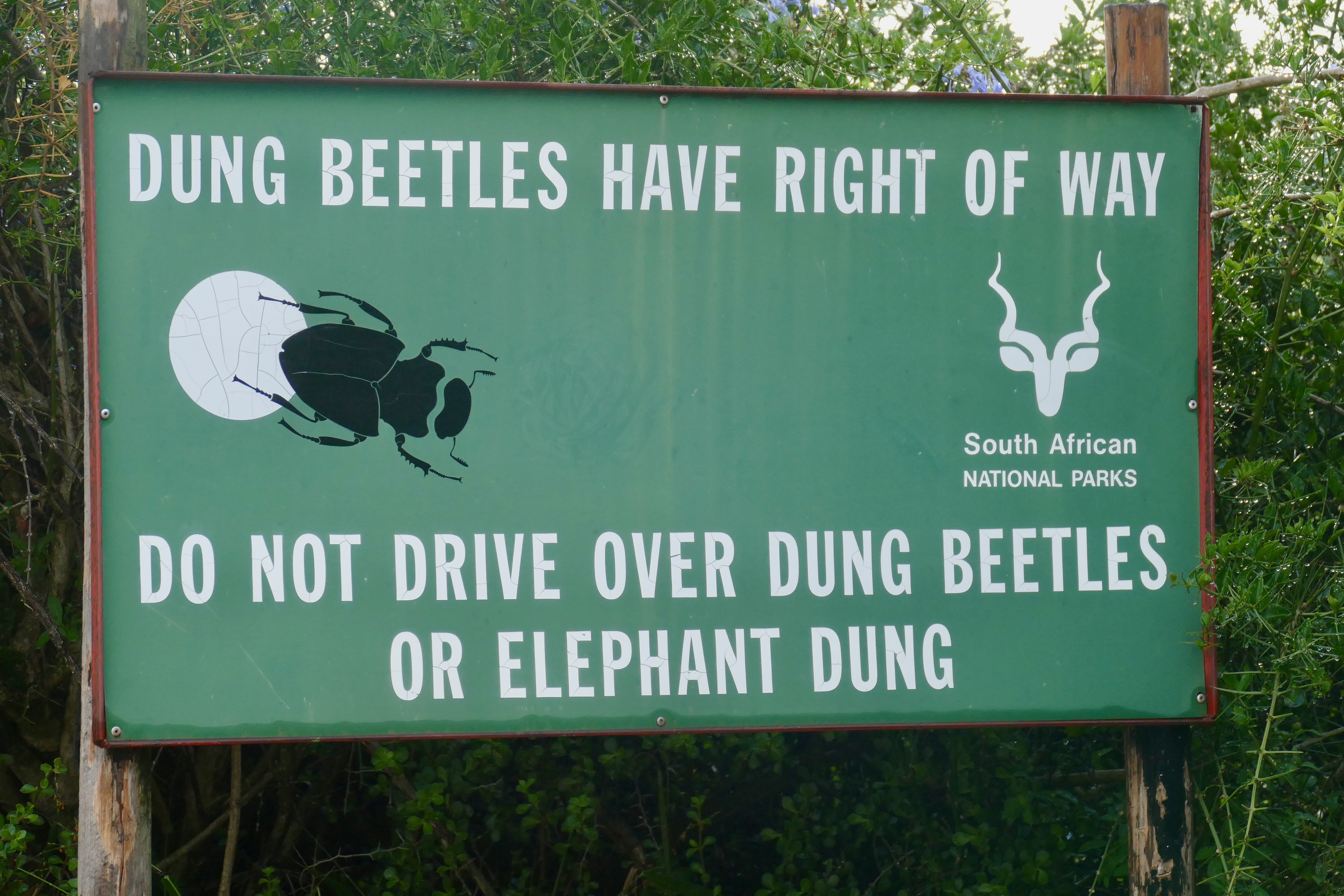
A road sign in a South African park stating that dung beetles have the right of way; Paul McCartney encountered a similar one during his trip to a safari.

Paul McCartney was inspired to write "Wild Life" during a 1966 safari in Africa, after seeing a sign at the entrance of a game reserve that read: All you people in motor cars, remember the animals have the right of way. McCartney later gave a differing account to Paul Du Noyer during an interview, recalling the sign as reading, "Elephants have the right-of-way". McCartney considered it "the first song we've done which is saying something ... And it just says that nature's all right. The wild state is a good state. So why are we getting rid of it? Let's not. The animals are in zoos, instead of just running, like they are supposed to". Employing the metaphor of wildlife to discuss corruption in politics, "Wild Life" is often deemed his first openly political song. Authors Vincent P. Benitez Jr. and John Blaney argue it could also be interpreted as a critique of left-wing activism, with the former citing the line "You're breathing a lot of political nonsense in the air". McCartney's wife and Wings bandmate, Linda McCartney, is credited as a writer.

After an introduction in C major, the song mainly follows the key of C minor. It is in 3/4 time throughout. "Wild Life" centres around a repeated sequence of three descending chords played by Linda on the electric keyboard: C minor, B-flat major and F major.

== Recording and production ==
The band rehearsed "Wild Life" on 22 July 1971 at the McCartney's makeshift studio at High Park Farm, located in Kintyre, Scotland. Recording for the song began on 26 July, with McCartney on bass guitar, Linda on keyboard, Denny Laine on electric guitar, and Denny Seiwell on drums. McCartney later said of Linda's performance: "We were all surprised at the way she plays it—it’s all up tempo and everything, and she hits it perfectly". Biographer Peter Ames Carlin believed Linda's keyboard "come[s] through clearly" on the track. The group returned to the track on 30 July to record overdubs. While Seiwill stayed in the control room, McCartney sang the lead vocals first, followed by backing vocals sung on a single microphone by the McCartneys and Laine. A second overdub section occurred on 2 October, during which McCartney recorded lead guitar and acoustic guitar introduction; the track was later mixed on 15 October.

== Release and reception ==
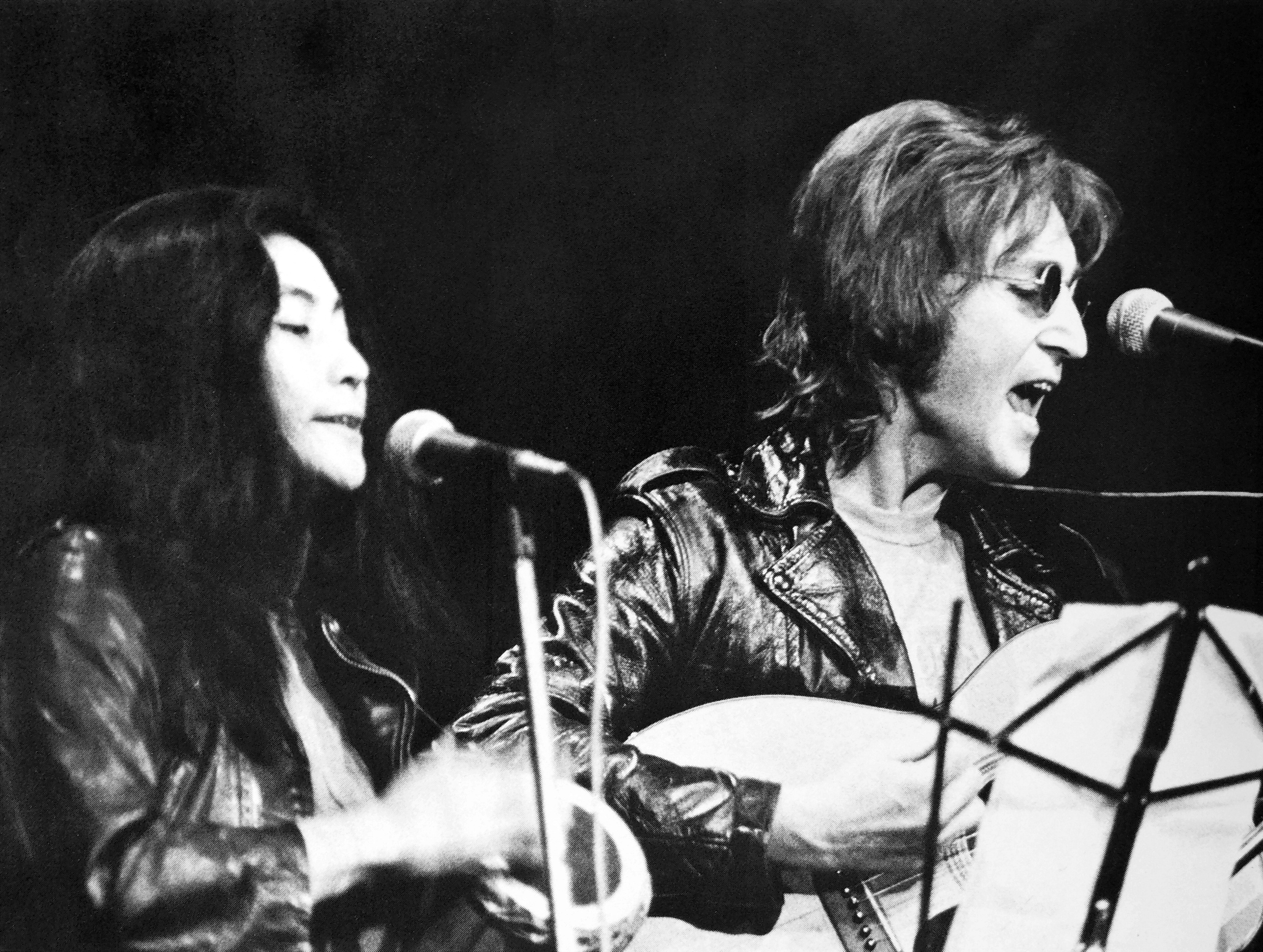
John Lennon and his wife Yoko Ono at the John Sinclair Freedom Rally (1971); many writers have drawn a parallel between McCartney's political advocacy in the song and Lennon's.

Wild Life was released on 7 December 1971 as the fourth track of the album of the same name. Upon release, the album and its title track were received poorly by music journalists. In Rolling Stone, John Mendelsohn described the song's theme as "a subtle but discernible parody of [John] Lennon's stance as a social critic", adding that McCartney's "raspily sung notes at the beginning of the song remind me more than a little of Lennon's vocal approach on the primal screaming album". Lew Harris deemed it "innocuous" rock music that suffices when listened to as background noise. By contrast, Billboard's reviewer highlighted the track as one of Wild Life's four successes. The Los Angeles Times' Robert Hilburn said lyrics "seem a shade too remote for maximum effectiveness", while according to Gil Wahlquist of The Sydney Morning Herald, the personal attacks featured in them give one "the feeling [McCartney] doesn't like people". In a review of the album, Richard Green called "Wild Life" "heavy and sombre" and pointed out its raucous vocals and simple instrumentation.

Retrospective reviewers mostly express a disliking for the track. Record Collector's Jamie Atkins thinks the "relentless doom-plod" of the bass alongside the "demented limits to which [Paul] pushes his vocals [and] the placid, Lennon-ish backing vocals" result in an "incongruous" mix and a "feral, hypnotic dirge"; he likens McCartney's performance to Neil Young's in "Tonight's the Night". Biographer Philip Norman argues that "Wild Life" addressed the McCartneys' concern for animal abuse rather than "a rock star's existence"; he adds: "[While McCartney] could write devastatingly about small human detail, broad-brush campaigning in the John Lennon mode reduced him to banality". On the other hand, John Blaney thought the track was as politically astute as any of Lennon's works, or those of left-wing intellectuals in general. Defending Wild Life, Billboard writer Morgan Enos argues that while it "should come across as embarassing", "it comes off as outsider art ... 'A lot of political nonsense going on,' [McCartney] repeatedly adds, as if he’s digging at John and Yoko [Ono]'s self-seriousness and ideological hectoring in the early '70s". Rhythmically, Chris Welch praises the song's "pendulous beat" in his 1984 biography of McCartney; Beatles historian Kenneth Womack instead calls the track "lumbering". McCartney's lead vocal often features as a subject of interest in critical reviews, described variously as "a ripper", "bizarro screams" and "a pain", by John M. Borack, Enos and Welch, respectively.

During a concert held on 16 February 1971, McCartney attempted to introduce the song on stage, but Linda suffered a bout of stage fright and forgot the chords of her opening keyboard part. She soon recovered once McCartney reminded her of them. In a 2025 interview, McCartney remembered the audience thinking that the couple was pulling a joke. After the concert ended, Linda broke down and told him, "I feel totally out of place, [e]veryone is so down on me." McCartney performed the song a total of 55 times by 8 September 2025: 54 times with Wings and once as a solo artist, making it the track on Wild Life he has performed the most.

A live in-studio recording of "Wild Life" came out on the 2024 album One Hand Clapping, and the original Wild Life studio recording was included on the deluxe edition of the compilation album Wings one year later.

== Personnel ==
According to authors John Blaney, Adrian Sinclair and Allan Kozinn:

- Paul McCartney – vocals, bass, lead and acoustic guitar
- Linda McCartney – keyboard, backing vocals
- Denny Laine – electric guitar, vocals
- Denny Seiwell – drums
