= Some People Never Know =

1971 song by Wings

Song by Wings

from the album Wild Life
- Released: 7 December 1971
- Recorded: 25 and 30 July, 4 September and 2–15 October 1971
- Length: 6:38
- Label: Apple
- Songwriters: Paul McCartney; Linda McCartney
- Producer: Paul McCartney (Note: Bill Harry credits Linda McCartney as a producer, too.)

Licensed audio
- "Some People Never Know" on YouTube

"Some People Never Know" is a song by the English rock band Wings, released as the opening track on side two of the band's debut album Wild Life (1971). It uses the metaphor of people oblivious as to what love is for Paul to sing about his and his wife Linda McCartney's love.

== Background and composition ==
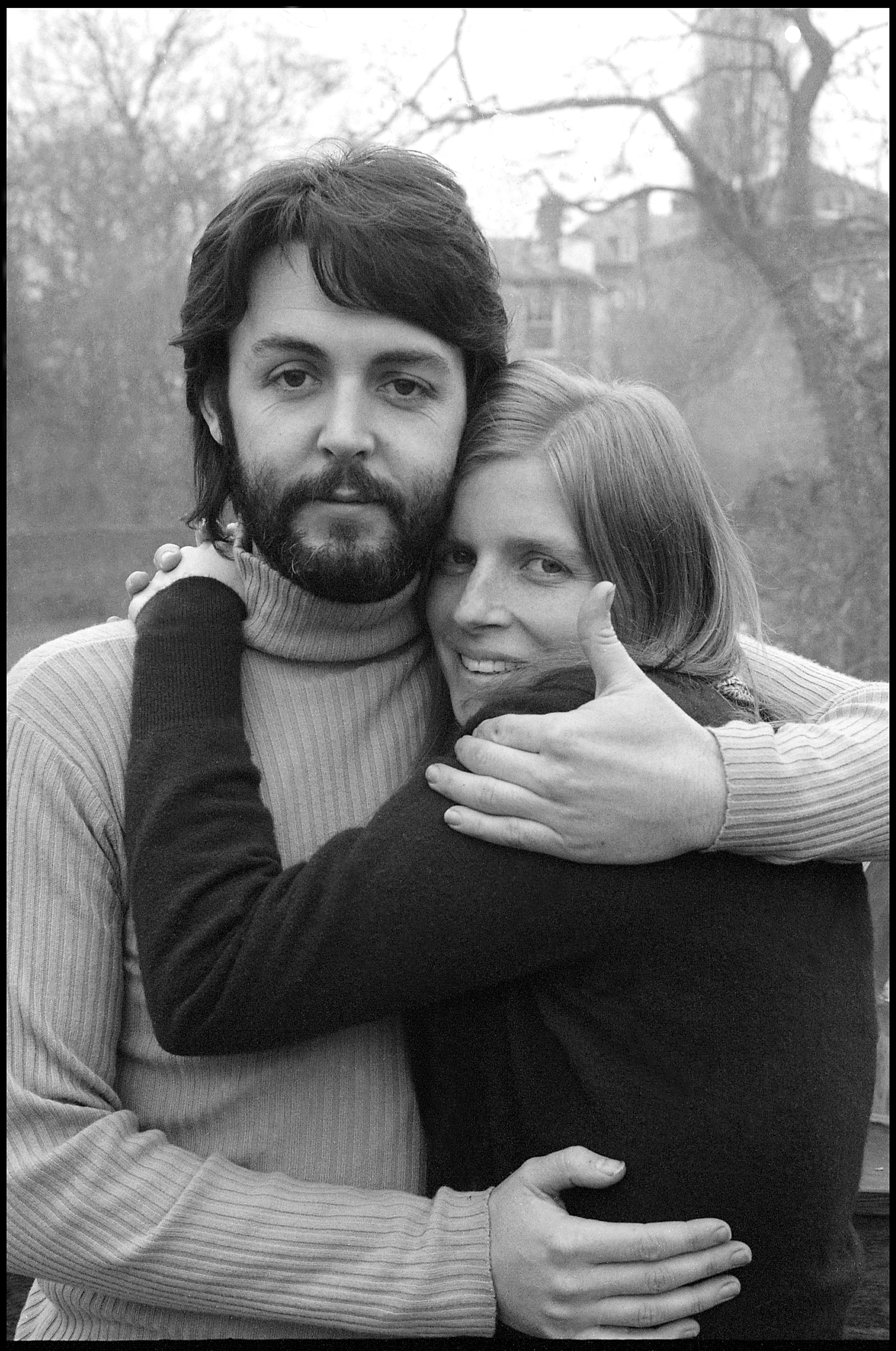
Paul and Linda McCartney in 1969

"Some People Never Know" dates back to as early as the summer of 1969, during Linda and Paul McCartney's vacation to Barbados. In it, Paul uses a metaphor of people oblivious as to what love is to talk about his and Linda's love. Talking to interviewer Paul Du Noyer, McCartney called it "me and Linda’s love song, us against the world."

== Recording and production ==
Paul McCartney had initially recorded a demo for "Some People Never Know" during the sessions for Ram earlier that year. Proper recording of the song began on 25 July 1971, where the group did a rehearsal and four takes of the track; the final take was deemed best. The personnel on the take selected for overdubs consisted of Paul on acoustic guitar, Denny Laine on bass, and Denny Seiwell on drums. Overdubbing began the same day, as Paul added a harmonium and electric piano, Laine added his own acoustic guitar, and Paul and Linda provided lead and backing vocals; having reportedly taken much effort to perfect them, their harmonies surprising engineer Tony Clark. Five days later, on 30 July, the group worked on overdubs again, mainly harmonies, although Seiwell performed a saxophone solo during the session. Paul later removed the solo several times before a rough mix was made to preserve it. The group also decided to add a layer of African percussion to the end of the track before moving on to the next track, using the same African percussion used during an earlier jam session titled "African Rhythm". Encyclopedist Bill Harry stresses the abundant acoustic guitar work on the track.

The group reconvened on 4 September to add more overdubs. While Paul liked the rough mix Alan Parsons had made on 30 July, he felt the instrumentation needed more, and so he brought a small group of woodwind musicians to overdub various woodwind instruments; this yielded, among other things, an oboe solo. The final overdubbing session was done on 9 October. It consisted of a twin guitar solo, performed by Paul and Laine as an alternative to Seiwell's saxophone solo from 30 July, and backing vocals—this time from all four members: Linda singing soprano, Paul and Laine singing tenor, and Seiwell singing bass. In addition, Seiwell added higher frequency vocals and a whirly tube producing different sounds depending on how it is swung around that he bought from a street vendor; Paul liked it and decided to add it.

== Release and reception ==
"Some People Never Know" was released on Wild Life as the first track of its second side. Author John Blaney writes that it "relies on understatement to underline content". Record Collector writer Jamie Atkins called it a "melodic masterclass that begins as a letter of devotion to Linda before a shift into a defence of their love" apparently aimed at his former Beatles bandmate John Lennon, someone whose "public barbs, both in song and the music press, had hit Paul hard". Authors Chip Madinger and Mark Easter called it an "acoustically-driven number", adding that either it or "Tomorrow" could have been released as singles. Record Mirror writer Mike Hennessey calls it an "attractive slow tune with a nice guitar and piano intro and some appealing harmony", noting: "Again the repeated coda ala 'Hey Jude' is in evidence and the extended ending fades into a harmonized vocal reprise and then congas andmaraccas and a little light Dalek music." Author Peter Ames Carlin calls it a "sweet, oddly defensive ballad". Author Robert Rodriguez stated it "mentions people who can sleep at night, but the context in no way suggests it is a response to John’s riposte." McCartney biographer Tom Doyle likened it to the Everly Brothers' music. Fellow biographer Chris Welch believed McCartney was "at his vocal best on the least pretentious, simplest songs like Some People Never Know which had an easy tune and unmannered vocals." In Los Angeles Times, Robert Hilburn called it a "melodic number with a nice duet by the McCartneys.", although he doesn't believe it to be a direct answer to John Lennon's "How Do You Sleep?" which was Lennon's attack on McCartney. In a unnumbered ranking of McCartney's 3 "most honest" tracks, Em Casalena called it thought it to be a "surprisingly raw and relatively stripped-down song", noting that some people thought it to be the "exploration of the very human feeling of regret, particularly when it comes to missed romantic opportunities", concluding McCartney's vocal to be one of Casalena's "personal favorite vocal performances from the former Beatle."

"Some People Never Know" was included on the 2025 compilation Wings, a collection of hits spanning Wings' entire career selected by McCartney himself.

== Personnel ==
According to authors John Blaney, Allan Kozinn, and Adrian Sinclair:

Wings

- Paul McCartney – lead vocal, backing vocals, piano, harmonium, electric piano, acoustic guitar, electric guitar
- Denny Laine – tenor harmony backing vocal, bass, acoustic guitar, electric guitar
- Denny Seiwell – drums, bass harmony vocal and vocal frequencies, whirly tube
- Linda McCartney – backing vocals, soprano backing vocal

Additional personnel

- Richard Hewson – woodwind orchestra arranger

Production

- Paul McCartney – production
- Alan Parsons – engineer
- Tony Clark – engineer
