= Wild Life (Wings album) =

Studio album by Wings
- Released: 7 December 1971 (Note: According to Kozinn and Sinclair, contemporary British sources list the date between 3 and 10 December, and American sources list the date between 6 and 13 December. In their official discography, the authors list 3 December in the UK and 6 December in the US, but state that these cannot be confirmed due to a label dispute. Luca Perasi lists the same dates. The 2025 book Wings: The Story of a Band on the Run lists the first release date as 3 December. Modern sources list the release date as 7 December.)
- Recorded: 24 July – 16 October 1971
- Studios: EMI, London
- Genres: Rock; pop
- Length: 37:43
- Label: Apple
- Producer: Paul McCartney

Wings chronology
Wild Life (1971)	Red Rose Speedway (1973)

Paul McCartney chronology
Ram (1971)	Wild Life (1971)	Red Rose Speedway (1973)

Wild Life is the debut studio album by the British-American rock band Wings and the third studio album by Paul McCartney after the break-up of the Beatles. The album was mainly recorded in late July 1971, with additional overdub sessions in September and October, at EMI Studios in London. The line-up consisted of McCartney, his wife Linda, session drummer Denny Seiwell, whom the duo had worked with on their previous album Ram, and guitarist Denny Laine, formerly of the English rock band the Moody Blues. Paul McCartney's goal for the album was to record the songs quickly, in a few takes and with minimal overdubs.

The album features a mix of rock songs and ballads. It includes a reggae cover of the 1957 Mickey & Sylvia song "Love Is Strange" and "Dear Friend", McCartney's attempt at reconciliation with his former bandmate John Lennon. The album cover was shot by Barry Lategan in Osterley Park, West London, and depicts the band members in a country creek. Originally scheduled for release in November 1971, Wild Life's release was delayed to early December after an LP disc label dispute with Apple Records.

Wild Life was one of McCartney's least commercially successful albums. Upon release, it peaked at number 11 in the UK and number 10 in the US, where it was certified gold by January 1972. Critical reception was generally negative, reflecting the animosity the music press had towards McCartney following the Beatles' break-up. Many agreed that Wild Life fell short of the standards set by McCartney's work with the Beatles. McCartney has held mixed opinions on the record. The album was reissued with bonus tracks in 1993 as part of The Paul McCartney Collection and again as an expanded box set in 2018 as part of the Paul McCartney Archive Collection.

== Background ==
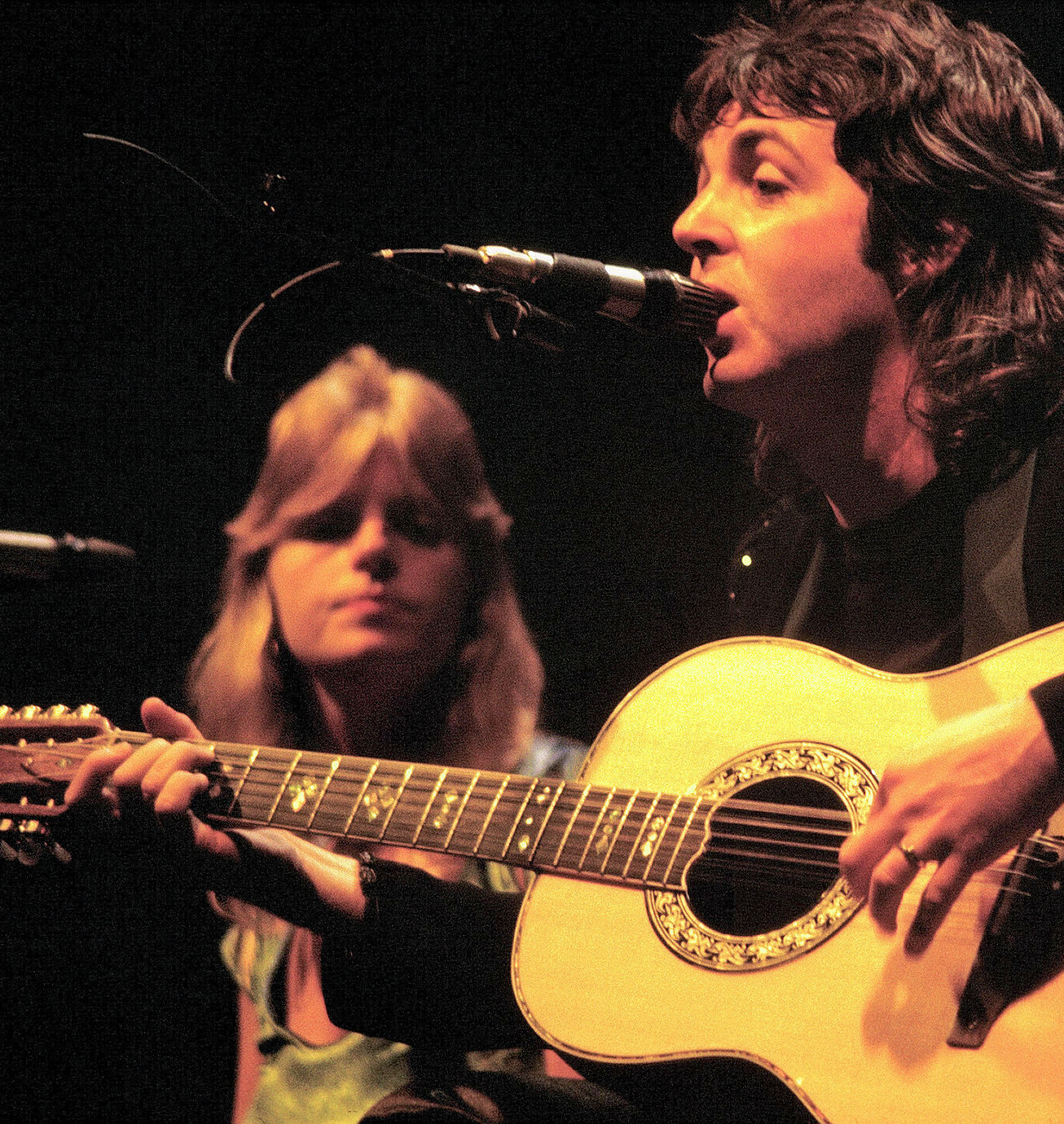
Paul and Linda McCartney in 1976

Following the release of Ram in May 1971, Paul McCartney decided to form a band to perform live. He included his wife Linda, as she had sung backing vocals on his debut solo album McCartney (1970), the "Another Day" single, and Ram, the last of which was credited to the McCartneys. Paul had insisted from the beginning of their marriage that Linda be involved in all of his musical projects despite her lack of musical experience. He explained that musicians are typically expected to leave their wives and kids at home when out on the road, but as a newlywed, he wanted to "stick together and play music at the same time". Linda did not wish to be in the band, but he convinced her and eventually taught her how to play keyboards.

In late June 1971, McCartney asked drummer Denny Seiwell and guitarist Hugh McCracken, both of whom played on Ram, if they wanted to join the band. Seiwell accepted, but McCracken declined due to other musical and family commitments. Paul wanted an experienced musician in the band, so in mid-July, he invited former Moody Blues guitarist Denny Laine, whom he had known since the early 1960s. Laine, working on a solo album at the time, dropped the plans for the album and accepted.

== Recording ==
=== Initial sessions ===
McCartney's goal for Wild Life was to use a modified version of the recording template used by the Beatles for the Get Back sessions, recording the songs quickly in a few takes with minimal overdubs. He cited Bob Dylan's quick recording schedule for his album New Morning (1970) as an inspiration for the sessions. As McCartney said, "... [W]e heard he had been in the studio and done an album in just a week. So we thought of doing it like that, putting down the spontaneous stuff and not being too careful."

Rehearsals for the album took place at McCartney's recording studio in Scotland, dubbed Rude Studio, on 22 July 1971. The line-up for the band, still unnamed, was the McCartneys, Laine and Seiwell. The group demoed some of the songs from the 1970 Ram sessions, including "Tomorrow" and "I Am Your Singer", and new songs such as "Bip Bop" and "Wild Life".

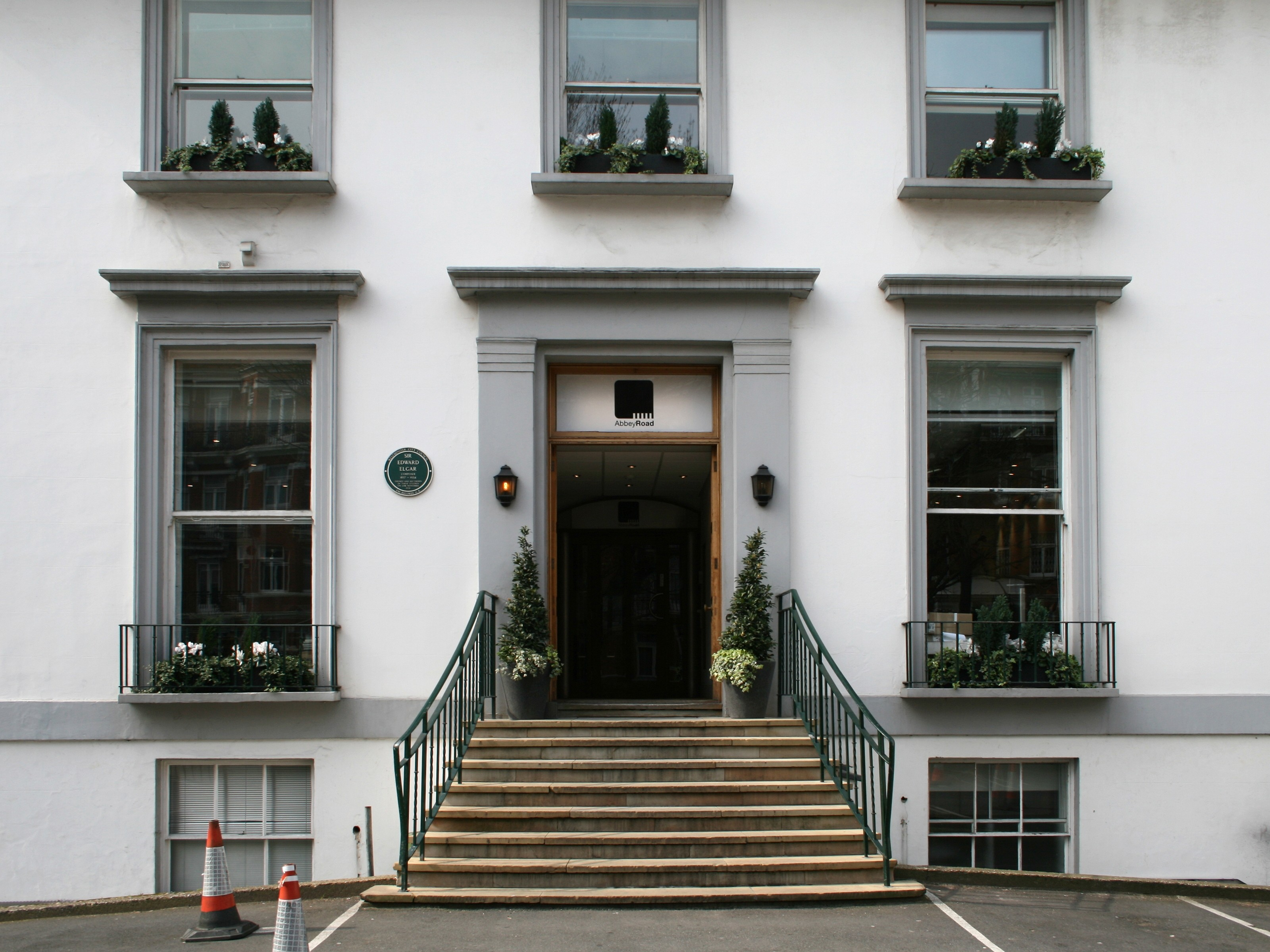
Wild Life was recorded entirely at London's EMI Studios (pictured in 2007).

After the rehearsals at Rude, recording moved to EMI Studios in London on 24 July. The band were booked under the pseudonym Sam Browne in the hope of avoiding press detection. The sessions were engineered by Tony Clark and Alan Parsons, (Note: Clark had previously worked with the Beatles on their fan-club exclusive Christmas records, while Parsons had worked on Abbey Road (1969) and engineered the Get Back sessions with Glyn Johns.) and produced by Paul. (Note: According to Clark, "There was no actual producer in the box." He contributed to the studio setup and ensured comfort amongst the band members, after which he returned to the booth. When the band were jamming and "felt it was happening", Clark would instruct Parsons to press record.) Clark remembered the sessions being "very relaxed, mavellous and very enjoyable". According to Seiwell, five of the eight recorded tracks were done in one take. Paul had lead vocal parts on all tracks, sharing those duties with Linda on "I Am Your Singer" and "Some People Never Know". "Tomorrow" features background vocals from Laine and Linda. Three-part harmonies between the McCartneys and Laine later became a trademark of Wings' sound.

All of the backing tracks were recorded in three days. On the first day, the band recorded "Bip Bop", "I Am Your Singer", "Dear Friend" and "Half Past Ten", a reggae-style jam which evolved into a cover of "Love Is Strange" by Mickey & Sylvia; Linda made her debut on keyboards on the latter. (Note: Footage of McCartney playing "Bip Bop" and the outtake "Hey Diddle" from around this time was later included in the made-for-TV film Wings Over the World.) Discussing the first day, Laine stated that Paul "wanted to be in a band in a sense. He wanted equality as musicians in the studio [but] he would still have the final call". Parsons remembered Paul micro-managing Laine, dictating every note he played. The second day, 25 July, the band focused on the Ram demo "Some People Never Know" and overdubs, as well as recording a jam called "African Rhythm", featuring African instruments that were being used by the multi-instrumentalist Fela Kuti and his band Africa '70.

The following day, 26 July, the group recorded "Wild Life", "Tomorrow", "Mumbo" and an untitled jam. Paul told the New Musical Express that "Mumbo" was not rehearsed: "It was just something I'd done on piano, and they just fell in." According to Clark, they were jamming and he decided to start recording. McCartney, upon noticing, shouted "take it, Tony" and started ad-libbing lyrics. Following a few days' break, overdub sessions took place from 29–30 July. The first day featured members of the Dolmetsch Consort (Note: They included Jeanne Dolmetsch and Brian, Peter, Christine and Paul Blood.) adding recorder overdubs to "I Am Your Singer", while the second day saw vocal overdubs to "Some People Never Know", "Wild Life", "I Am Your Singer", "Bip Bop" and "Tomorrow". After the group and Clark had left, Parsons created experimental mixes of the songs recorded. He explained: "I was fairly new to engineering at that time. ... [I] did a mix of 'I Am Your Singer' while no one was there, partly for my own amusement, and partly because they wanted some reference copies."

=== Later sessions ===
The group took a break from recording throughout August, after which they reconvened on 31 August for further overdub sessions, which took place on 1 September ("Mumbo" and "Tomorrow") and 4 September ("Some People Never Know"). Recording halted again as Linda gave birth to the McCartneys' daughter, Stella, on 13 September. Her birth led to the naming of the band, Wings; according to Seiwell, "Paul said that she was delivered like on the wings of an angel or something. He took the word 'Wings' from that experience." (Note: Paul did not want the band to have a "The" in the name to avoid comparisons with the Beatles.)

Another ten overdub and mixing sessions were carried out from 2–15 October. Tracks worked on included "Love Is Strange", "Wild Life", "Tomorrow", "Mumbo", "Some People Never Know" and "Little Woman Love". Also devised was "Bip Bop Link", a fingerpicked guitar piece that acted as a transition, or "segue", between two album tracks. It was recorded as a test while Clark was setting up microphones. Another link was created from "Mumbo" after that track was completed, as McCartney wanted an "acoustic" link and an "electric" link. On 16 October, the orchestration for "Dear Friend" was recorded, conducted by Richard Hewson. Clark revealed to the author Luca Perasi: "There was some discussion about the orchestra being too overpowering, but with a phasing effect and subtle level on the mix it seemed to work." Album sequencing took place shortly thereafter. Mastering was done by Peter Tacklet at EMI on 20 October.

== Music and lyrics ==
Wild Life is noted for its raw production. The music is divided into two sides: a "fast, rock side" and a "slower, ballad side". This was done deliberately; according to the authors Allan Kozinn and Adrian Sinclair, the "looser" songs were placed on side one and the "more complex" songs on side two. As Linda said in a 1971 interview:

The first side of the album is taken up with rock numbers. We did that on purpose, ... so it can be played at parties. One side for when you want to get up and dance and the second side for the girls, when they want to smooch around.

Rock songs include "Mumbo" and "Bip Bop". "Mumbo" features nonsense words that music professor Vincent Benitez Jr. syas mirrors its title, or "mumbo jumbo". "Bip Bop" was described by Billboard magazine's Morgan Enos as a "faux-blues throwaway". Its guitar playing was compared to the stylings of Merle Travis. The song was a favourite of the McCartneys' daughter Mary. However, McCartney later said poorly of "Bip Bop": "It just goes nowhere. I still cringe every time I hear it." Wings' rendition of Mickey & Sylvia's "Love Is Strange" is influenced by reggae, which was inspired by the McCartneys' 1971 family trip to Jamaica. Paul explained: "Reggae is the newest and best beat around. There are more possibilities with reggae than anything at the moment." Side one concludes with the title track, which expresses McCartney's support for the preservation of wild animals. The song dates back to a 1966 safari trip to Kenya, where Paul saw a road sign stating animals have the right of way, directly inspiring the song. Benitez Jr. and John Blaney argue that "Wild Life" could be interpreted as a possible critique of left-wing activism, with the former citing the line "You're breathing a lot of political nonsense in the air".

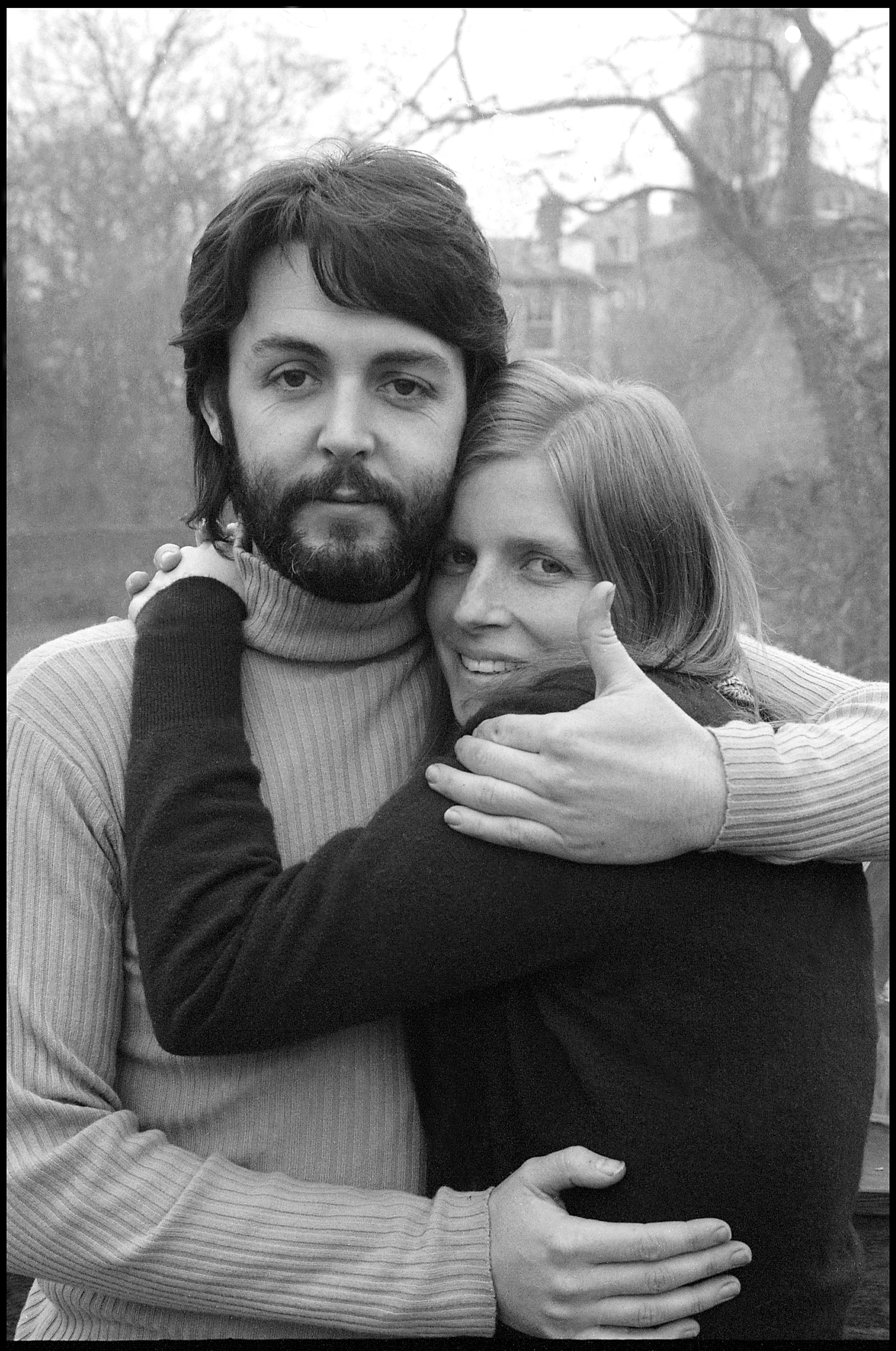
Paul and Linda McCartney in 1969. The two duet on "Some People Never Know" and "I Am Your Singer".

Side two begins with "Some People Never Know", a soft, melodic ballad about love, featuring vocals from Linda. It dates back to Paul and Linda's 1969 holiday to Barbados. Paul's requited love for Linda inspired the song and the subsequent track "I Am Your Singer", a duet between the two. "Bip Bop Link" and "Mumbo Link", the latter of which appears at the end of the album, were initially unlisted tracks on the original LP; they were named for the album's CD reissue. Benitez Jr. believes that, by including the two tracks on Wild Life, McCartney attempted to create a more cohesive record than one of individual songs. The McCartneys' relationship inspired "Tomorrow", a piano ballad that celebrates Paul's renewed self-confidence that Linda gave him and how her love will not let him down the following day. It was based on the chord changes of Paul's Beatles song "Yesterday" (1965). The author Tom Doyle likens "Tomorrow" to "Yesterday", as McCartney reveals his insecurity and "plead[s] with his lover not to let him down".

"Dear Friend" was McCartney's attempt at reconciliation with John Lennon. It followed Lennon's attack on McCartney in the song "How Do You Sleep?", from Imagine (1971), which, in turn, was written in retaliation for McCartney's perceived digs at his bandmate on Ram's "Too Many People" (1971). In the song, McCartney pleads to his former friend that their public bickering must end and reminisces about the happier times they once had. Music critic Ian MacDonald cited "Dear Friend" as a counter-argument to the caricature of McCartney as an emotional lightweight. With minor orchestration and brass, Robert Rodriguez describes the song as "possibly the most musically developed" on the record.

== Album cover and packaging ==
Simplicity is a great thing. Just a very simple thought, from the heart. [...] It's a place that the photographer knew just outside London, and it was kind of like a stately home. So he suggested we aim here. We liked the idea of just such a nice photograph, just being able to just use it clean.

— Paul McCartney, Wings: The Story of a Band on the Run, 2025

The album's cover photograph, depicting the members of Wings in a country creek, was shot by Barry Lategan in Osterley Park, West London, on 1 October 1971. Linda suggested Lategan after witnessing a photograph of the model Marie Helvin in British Vogue, in which Helvin sits on a fallen tree limb above a lake. According to Kozinn and Sinclair, Paul and Linda believed the setting offered "an idealized version of the image they wanted to project to the public about that life [they were pursuing]". Lategan used the same location as the Helvin shot but shot the band members at a further distance and in several configurations. In the final shot, Seiwell is sitting on the left, smiling at a dove flying between him and Paul. The latter is standing in thigh-high water, strumming his Epiphone Texan FT-79 acoustic guitar, while a dove and Linda's hand rest on his shoulder. Linda sits next to Paul, staring straight ahead while a dove flies to her left. Laine sits on the far right, balancing on the log, smiling while gazing at Paul. Although the image's setting suggests a personification of the song "Wild Life", the album title was not yet decided when the cover was taken.

Unlike the packaging for McCartney and Ram, Wild Life did not feature a gatefold sleeve nor accompanying photographs by Linda. The cover photograph did not feature the band's name or album title on the front; instead, it appeared on the spine and back cover, printed in a large Bauhaus font. The eight song titles appeared on the back in two rows. For its American release, Capitol Records added a sticker reading "Wings Wild Life" in yellow all caps. The accompanying liner notes were written by "Clint Harrigan", a pseudonym for Paul, who also sketched the band wearing angel wings. Unlike McCartney's previous releases for Apple Records, Paul scrapped the label's signature Granny Smith LP labels, wanting Wings' debut album to be distinct from the Beatles' brand. The vinyl labels were replaced by close-up photographs of Paul and Linda for sides one and two, respectively; Paul has a poppy on his face, and Linda is emerging from a swimming pool, wiping water from her face.

== Release ==
=== Promotion ===
After the criticism of McCartney, I put so much into Ram to try and please myself and the critics. With Wings I don't care if people don't like it. I like it. I've got an awful lot to live up to, that's the problem. But I know I'm good. If I'm in the right mood, I can write a solid gold hit.

— Paul McCartney to Disc & Music Echo, 1971

The band's formation was announced to the media on 3 August 1971, followed by the group's name on 9 October. On 18 September, McCartney's spokesperson, Shelley Turner, announced the upcoming release of a maxi-single to the press, although this never materialised. Throughout October, the McCartneys made the final preparations for Wild Life, anticipated for release on 15 November. At the same time, they prepared the release of Thrillington, an instrumental cover album of Ram, recorded in June.

On 8 November, the group held a press party at the Empire Ballroom in Leicester Square, London, where they announced the group and Wild Life. Nicknamed The Ball, the event featured eight hundred guests, including Elton John and members of the Who, Faces and Led Zeppelin. At the same press party, in an interview with Melody Maker, McCartney said that the group should soon be performing live. Two days later, McCartney invited various critics to a Wild Life listening session and interview at EMI Studios. He spoke at length about then-legal troubles with his former Beatles bandmates and about his plans for Wings, such as touring. He declared he was proud of Wild Life and did not care what critics thought. Nevertheless, his former bandmate George Harrison voiced his disapproval of the record in an interview with Record Mirror, to which McCartney replied: "Any criticism hurts me, especially from George."

Pushback from EMI over the missing Apple logo on the disc labels led to the album's delay; a compromise was reached in which the words "An Apple Record" appeared in very small text on each label. Additionally, a manufacturing error in the initial pressings caused skipping between the vinyl grooves, resulting in a Melody Maker advert on 4 December that asserted the album would be released "as soon as possible". Eventually, the album was released sometime between 3 and 13 December; modern sources list the release date as 7 December. Kozinn and Sinclair write that the album's delay led to diminished fanfare from the November press party, leading its eventual December release to be a "whimper" rather than the "explosion of excitement" McCartney hoped for.

=== Commercial performance ===
Wild Life was one of McCartney's least commercially successful albums. It reached number 11 in the UK, only spending nine weeks on the chart. In the US, it peaked at number 10, selling 500,000 copies by January 1972 and earning a gold certification by the Recording Industry Association of America (RIAA). Elsewhere, it reached number 2 in Spain, number 3 in Australia and number 5 in Canada, where it achieved a gold disc for selling 50,000 copies. Total sales in Europe were about 400,000 and 28,000 in Japan. Stickers labelling the artist and album name were reportedly attached to the cover in hopes of increasing sales. No singles were released from the album in the UK or the US. A promotional single, "Love Is Strange" b/w "I Am Your Singer", was distributed in the UK, (Note: Catalogue number Apple R 5932) but the commercial release was cancelled due to poor album sales.

In December 1971, the Ram outtake "Breakfast Blues" was mixed by Paul and Linda at A&R Studios in New York City, retitled "The Great Cock and Seagull Race", with overdubs by the rest of Wings. Wings introduced the song during a promotional interview with CBS disc jockey Ed Williams, announcing a potential single release; this release never occurred. An earlier mix of "The Great Cock and Seagull Race" by engineer Dixon Van Winkle was released on the 2012 special edition of Ram, while the Wings version appeared on the 2018 reissue of Wild Life.

== Critical reception ==
=== Initial reviews ===
Following Ram's poor reception, Wild Life was also greeted with negative reviews from music critics; sentiments towards McCartney had been generally negative in the music press following the Beatles' break-up. In Rolling Stone, John Mendelsohn wondered whether the album was "deliberately second-rate", writing that Wild Life is "largely high on sentiment but rather flaccid musically and impotent lyrically, trivial and unaffecting", but nevertheless "unpretentious". More negatively, in The Beatles: An Illustrated Record (1981), Roy Carr and Tony Tyler called the album "rushed, defensive, badly timed, and over-publicized" and wrote that it showed McCartney's songwriting "at an absolute nadir just when he needed a little respect". In The Beatles Forever (1978), Nicholas Schaffner said Wild Life was "sloppily performed, musically listless, and lyrically excruciating".

Many agreed that Wild Life fell short of the standards set by McCartney's work with the Beatles. In Melody Maker, Roy Hollingworth disregarded McCartney's claim that Wild Life was music to dance to, writing that it is "a dream album for airline hostesses" and, musically, it has "too many maracas" and "not enough balls". Sounds magazine's Steve Peacock found some of the songs too long and believed McCartney worked best with people "who can spur him". Critics like Peacock and Lew Harris of the Chicago Tribune considered Wild Life an improvement over McCartney and Ram, while they and Robert Hilburn held out hope that McCartney could one day produce an album equivalent in quality to his Beatles work. In his scathing review, Harris, calling McCartney the "idiot child of rock", snidely remarked: "At this rate, he should match the quality of [Lennon's] Imagine, [Harrison's] All Things Must Pass and [Starr's] Beaucoups of Blues sometime in mid-1976." Speaking with Paul Gambaccini for the 1976 book In His Own Words, McCartney said of Wild Life:

I must say, you have to like me to like the record. I mean, if it's just taken cold, I think it wasn't that brilliant as a recording. We did it in about two weeks, the whole thing. And it had been done on that kind of buzz we'd been hearing about how Dylan had come in and done everything in one take. I think, in fact, often we never gave the engineer a chance to even set up a balance.

Nevertheless, not all reviews were negative. The NME's Richard Green called Wild Life a "good, solid album" that should "draw forth favourable criticism from even the most biased quarters". In Disc & Music Echo, Peter Gavin described the album as "an appealing mixture of fun, melody and excitement". Mike Hennessey of Record Mirror found Wild Life "unquestionably Paul McCartney's best solo album [sic] to date", highlighting "Tomorrow" and "Dear Friend" as "classic, vintage McCartney, sharply bringing into focus his flair for melody and harmony". However, Hennessey believed that the album, although good, "falls a long way short of the masterpiece Paul has the capacity to produce". Billboard's reviewer said the album was "more acoustic and less gimmicky" than McCartney's two previous albums.

=== Retrospective reviews ===
Professional ratings
Review scores
Source	Rating
AllMusic	3/5 stars
Christgau's Record Guide	C−
The Encyclopedia of Popular Music	2/5 stars
The Essential Rock Discography	4/10
MusicHound	2.5/5
Q	1/5 stars
The Rolling Stone Album Guide	2/5 stars

Decades later, Wild Life continues to receive mixed reviews; it has appeared at the bottom in several lists ranking McCartney's solo and Wings albums from worst to best. Authors and biographers generally hold the album in low regard. Chris Ingram, in The Rough Guide to the Beatles (2009), called Wild Life a "deeply misguided record", further saying: "Though the album has its apologists from those who enjoy their McCartney rough and ready, this one really is only for the curious who have got everything else." Howard Sounes thought the majority of the album to be composed of meaningless and insubstantial tunes. He also opined that McCartney's decision to produce the album himself led to him releasing songs "that should have never left the studio". Robert Rodriguez believed that the album would have been received better had it not been released as Wings' debut album, instead acting as a "glimpse inside Wings' formative stage" rather than a "disappointing waste of time". He also thought shelving the record would have saved McCartney from much of the public discourse he would receive in the ensuing years. Peter Doggett called the album a "severe embarrassment". More positively, John Blaney wrote that the album contains songs that are "as good as anything [McCartney's] written", despite a few throwaways. Some have named "Tomorrow" and "Dear Friend" as standouts.

Other commentators have given mixed assessments. Stephen Thomas Erlewine of AllMusic thought that the album's "featherweight" material made for a "bizarrely fascinating" record, writing that McCartney made something that "sounds easy ... and that's what's frustrating and amazing about it". Writing positively in The Mojo Collection (2009), Jim Irvin praised the album as a "fascinating" one, a "sparse, bare-bones defiance" that harkened back to the early days of rock'n'roll and anticipated the "lo-fi boom" of the 1990s. He ultimately considered it Wings' most "distinctive" album. In 2016, Nick DeRiso of Ultimate Classic Rock described Wild Life as a "throwaway project" and as lacking "resonant" material. The same year, Classic Rock magazine's Max Bell referred to the album as "much maligned but decent". Two years later, Billboard magazine's Morgan Enos argued that the album is more enjoyable decades after its original release, as listeners can enjoy its "low-key and low stakes" approach without residing in the shadow of McCartney's work with the Beatles. In the booklet accompanying the 2025 compilation album Wings, Aubrey Powell, a Hipgnosis designer who created several of Wings' cover artworks, argued that Wild Life proved that "the needs of family and art can merge and thrive".

== Track listing ==
All tracks are written by Paul and Linda McCartney, except "Love is Strange", written by Mickey Baker, Sylvia Vanterpool and Ethel Smith (Bo Diddley).

Side one

1. "Mumbo" – 3:54
2. "Bip Bop" – 4:14
3. "Love Is Strange" – 4:50
4. "Wild Life" – 6:48

Side two

1. "Some People Never Know" – 6:35
2. "I Am Your Singer" – 2:15
3. "Bip Bop Link" – 0:52
4. "Tomorrow" – 3:28
5. "Dear Friend" – 5:53
6. "Mumbo Link" – 0:46

Additional tracks on the 1993 CD reissue

11. "Give Ireland Back to the Irish" – 3:44
12. "Mary Had a Little Lamb" – 3:32
13. "Little Woman Love" – 2:07
14. "Mama's Little Girl" – 3:45

Notes: "Bip Bop Link" and "Mumbo Link" are unlisted on album pressings released before 1987.

== Reissues ==
Wild Life was first released on CD by EMI's budget Fame label on 5 October 1987. In addition to naming the previously hidden tracks ("Bip Bop Link" and "Mumbo Link"), this edition added "Oh Woman, Oh Why" (the B-side of "Another Day"), "Mary Had a Little Lamb" and the Ram outtake "Little Woman Love" as bonus tracks. A remastered CD edition on Parlophone and Capitol was released on 20 June 1989. In 1993, Wild Life was remastered and reissued on CD as part of The Paul McCartney Collection series with the 1972 non-album singles "Give Ireland Back to the Irish" and "Mary Had a Little Lamb" as well as the B-sides "Little Woman Love" and "Mama's Little Girl".

Wild Life and Red Rose Speedway were reissued and remastered as part of the Paul McCartney Archive Collection on 7 December 2018, both separately and as a deluxe package titled Wings 1971–73. The deluxe edition included a 128-page book about the album's making written by David Fricke, a 48-page scrapbook, previously unreleased Polaroid photographs, lyrics and other memorabilia from the MPL archives. The bonus tracks included the 1972 singles "Give Ireland Back to the Irish", "Mary Had a Little Lamb" and "Hi, Hi, Hi" / "C Moon", along with their respective B-sides, a promo single edit of "Love Is Strange" and numerous home demos and studio outtakes.

To mark the album's 50th anniversary, a limited-edition, half-speed mastered vinyl pressing by Miles Showell at Abbey Road Studios from the original master tapes was released in 2022. Beatles author Kenneth Womack described it as a "powerful" and "ear-popping" remaster that turned the album into a "hidden gem", further calling "Dear Friend" a "veritable showstopper" and "a singular work of lasting beauty". Record Collector's Jamie Atkins was also positive, giving the remaster four out of five stars and calling it "a raw, brilliantly sloppy and human album that sounds a lot like freedom". In Goldmine magazine, John M. Borack said that the album received an "aural upgrade" from the remaster, describing an "overall crispness and freshness" the original master lacked.

== Personnel ==
According to Luca Perasi:

- Paul McCartney – lead vocals, backing vocals, bass guitar, acoustic guitar, electric guitar, piano, organ, percussion
- Linda McCartney – co-lead vocals ("Love Is Strange", "Some People Never Know", "I Am Your Singer"), organ, piano, percussion, backing vocals, chair ("Mumbo")
- Denny Laine – electric guitar, acoustic guitar, bass guitar, percussion, backing vocals, vibraphone ("Dear Friend")
- Denny Seiwell – drums, percussion, backing vocals
- Dolmetsch Consort – recorders ("I Am Your Singer")
- Alan Parsons – backing vocals ("Tomorrow")
- Unknown musicians – orchestra ("Dear Friend")

Technical

- Paul McCartney – producer
- Alan Parsons – engineer
- Tony Clark – engineer

== Charts and certifications ==
=== Weekly charts ===
Chart (1971–72)	Peak position
Australian Kent Music Report	3
Canadian RPM Albums Chart	5
Dutch Mega Albums Chart	6
Japanese Oricon LPs Chart	15
Norwegian VG-lista Albums	4
Spanish Albums Chart	2
Swedish Kvällstoppen Albums Chart	3 (Note: Kvällstoppen combined sales for albums and singles in the one chart. Wild Life peaked at number five on the hit parade on 11 January 1972.)
UK Albums Chart	11
US Billboard Top LPs & Tape	10
US Cash Box Top 100 Albums	6
US Record World 100 Top LP's	9
West German Media Control Albums Chart	47

Reissue
Chart (2018)	Peak position
German Albums (Offizielle Top 100)	64
UK Albums Chart	64
US Billboard 200	199

=== Year-end charts ===
Chart (1972)	Position
Australian Albums Chart	24

=== Certifications ===
Region	Certification	Certified units/sales
Canada (Music Canada)	Gold	50,000^{^}
United States (RIAA)	Gold	500,000^{^}
^{^} Shipments figures based on certification alone.
