= One Hand Clapping (Paul McCartney and Wings album) =

2024 live studio album

Live album (live-in-studio) by Paul McCartney and Wings
- Released: 14 June 2024
- Recorded: 26–30 August 1974
- Studios: Abbey Road, London
- Genre: Rock
- Length: 83:20; 94:29 (plus 7")
- Label: MPL Communications
- Producer: Paul McCartney

Wings chronology
The 7" Singles Box (2022)	One Hand Clapping (2024)	Wings (2025)

Singles from One Hand Clapping
- 1. "Junior's Farm (One Hand Clapping Sessions)" Released: 26 April 2024; 2. "Hi, Hi, Hi (One Hand Clapping Sessions)" Released: 17 May 2024

One Hand Clapping
- Poster for 2024 theatrical release
- Directed by: David Litchfield
- Starring: Paul McCartney and Wings
- Release date: 2 November 2010
- Running time: 55 minutes
- Country: United Kingdom
- Language: English

One Hand Clapping is a live-in-studio album by the British rock band Paul McCartney and Wings, released on 14 June 2024, nearly 50 years after it was recorded.

The album began as a rockumentary starring Paul McCartney and his then-band, Wings, and directed by David Litchfield. It was recorded over four days in August 1974 at Abbey Road Studios in London. The film features the band performing live in the studio and recording a potential live album, as well as voice-over interviews with the band members. Songs featured include numerous McCartney, Wings and Beatles hits, as well as some covers. Although a TV sales brochure was made, the film and album went unreleased at the time. In the decades since, they have been frequently bootlegged, and various tracks have been released on special editions of other McCartney and Wings albums. The film was finally released on 2 November 2010 as part of the box set reissue of Band on the Run, the first release in the Paul McCartney Archive Collection.

It was announced in August 2024 that the film had been remastered in 4K, and was released in cinemas on 26 September 2024.

== Background ==
The performance was recorded in Abbey Road Studios (known at the time as EMI Studios) over four days in August 1974, during Band on the Run's seventh week in a row at the top of the UK album charts. Paul McCartney, Linda McCartney and guitarist Denny Laine were joined by new members guitarist Jimmy McCulloch and drummer Geoff Britton, who were recruited after previous members Henry McCullough and Denny Seiwell had left just prior to recording Band on the Run. The band had just returned from Nashville, where they recorded their then-upcoming single "Junior's Farm". The band were also joined in the studio by orchestra conductor Del Newman and saxophonist Howie Casey, both of whom had previously played with McCartney and would go on to join the Wings touring band.

The performances were filmed by photographer David Litchfield. At Paul's request, Litchfield used videotape rather than film, presumably because McCartney intended for the performances to be viewed by him for band assessments rather than public consumption. Litchfield explained: "So what [Paul] wanted me to do was to set up in Abbey Road Studios and film the band playing, purely as a record of what it was then. Then he can look at it and see the band as the public saw it." Litchfield hired two cameramen, a video engineer, a sound engineer, an editor and a graphics designer, while engineer Geoff Emerick recorded 16-track masters of the performances. The band held their performances in high regard. After having not rehearsed together for five weeks, Linda said, "we couldn't believe how good we were–we were so tight, and everybody knew their stuff." By 27 August, Paul reconsidered the project as a documentary to promote Wings' new lineup. He picked the title, One Hand Clapping, from an overdubbing session in Nashville. On 30 August, Paul had Litchfield tape some solo acoustic performances in the backyard of EMI Studios to contrast with the studio footage.

After filming wrapped, Litchfield found the videotape problematic: "You couldn't edit the stuff. ... The only thing it had going for it was that you could put a soundtrack down, so the quality of the sound on all the stuff I did with [Paul] is absolutely brilliant, but the [visual quality] is shit. I had to [transfer the material] from video to film to edit it, and once you've gone down one generation, the quality just disappears." Litchfield and editor Brian Huberman began editing the footage in late September; Litchfield separated McCartney's acoustic performances into a separate film called Paul McCartney in 'The Backyard'. The film was left unreleased until 2010 when it was included in the box set reissue of Band on the Run as part of the Paul McCartney Archive Collection.

Some songs from the One Hand Clapping sessions were previously released, mostly as bonus tracks on the Paul McCartney Archive Collection reissues:

- "Live and Let Die" appears on the soundtrack album to the film The In-Laws from 2003.
- "Bluebird", "Jet", "Let Me Roll It", "Band on the Run", "Nineteen Hundred and Eighty Five" and "Country Dreamer" appear in the special and deluxe editions of Band on the Run from 2010.
- "Maybe I'm Amazed" appears in the special and deluxe editions of McCartney from 2011.
- "Soily", "Baby Face" and "Love My Baby" (digital download) appear in the special and deluxe editions of Venus and Mars from 2014.

== Album release ==
The album was released on 14 June 2024, on CD, LP and digital platforms. A special edition 2-LP containing an additional 7" record features six additional songs performed solo by McCartney in the backyard of the Abbey Road Studios on the final day of recording.

The album was mixed by Giles Martin and Steve Orchard.

== Critical reception ==
Professional ratings
Aggregate scores
Source	Rating
Metacritic	84/100
Review scores
Source	Rating
AllMusic	4/5 stars
Pitchfork	8.4/10

In the 2013 McCartney biography Man on the Run: Paul McCartney in the 1970s, author Tom Doyle calls the performances "tight and strong" and quotes drummer Geoff Britton as "being surprised to discover that, 'seeing us play, we were a good band'". However, Doyle believes the film is less favourable in how it depicts the personality clashes within the band.

AP critic Scott Bauer praised the "spirited performances" on the album, calling it "a fine snapshot" of McCartney's "post-Beatles creative high". Andrew Korpan of ClutchPoints similarly commented that "all of the songs are performed well and with plenty of energy", but noted "an overwhelming amount of synthesizers" throughout the album.

== Track listing ==
All songs written by Paul McCartney and Linda McCartney, except where noted

=== Disc 1 ===
Side 1
No.	Title	Writer(s)	Length
1.	"One Hand Clapping"	P. McCartney	2:15
2.	"Jet"		3:59
3.	"Soily"		3:55
4.	"C Moon" / "Little Woman Love"		3:19
5.	"Maybe I'm Amazed"	P. McCartney	4:52
6.	"My Love"		4:15

Side 2
No.	Title	Writer(s)	Length
7.	"Bluebird"		3:27
8.	"Let's Love"		1:09
9.	"All of You"	P. McCartney	2:04
10.	"I'll Give You a Ring"	P. McCartney	2:03
11.	"Band on the Run"		5:20
12.	"Live and Let Die"		3:26
13.	"Nineteen Hundred and Eighty Five"		5:50
14.	"Baby Face"	Benny Davis; Harry Akst	1:56
Total length:			47:50

=== Disc 2 ===
Side 1
No.	Title	Writer(s)	Length
1.	"Let Me Roll It"		4:28
2.	"Blue Moon of Kentucky"	Bill Monroe	3:05
3.	"Power Cut"		1:33
4.	"Love My Baby"	P. McCartney	1:13
5.	"Let It Be"	P. McCartney; John Lennon	1:02
6.	"The Long and Winding Road" / "Lady Madonna"	P. McCartney; J. Lennon	2:10

Side 2
No.	Title	Writer(s)	Length
7.	"Junior's Farm"		4:17
8.	"Sally G"		2:28
9.	"Tomorrow"		2:12
10.	"Go Now"	Larry Banks; Milton Bennett	3:35
11.	"Wild Life"		4:30
12.	"Hi, Hi, Hi"		3:57
Total length:			35:30

=== "The Backyard" Bonus 7-inch ===
Side A
No.	Title	Writer(s)	Length
1.	"Blackpool"	P. McCartney	1:43
2.	"Blackbird"	P. McCartney; J. Lennon	2:27
3.	"Country Dreamer"		2:17

Side B
No.	Title	Writer(s)	Length
1.	"Twenty Flight Rock"	Eddie Cochran; Ned Fairchild	2:08
2.	"Peggy Sue"	Buddy Holly; Norman Petty; Jerry Allison	1:24
3.	"I'm Gonna Love You Too"	Joe B. Mauldin; Niki Sullivan; N. Petty	1:10
Total length:			11:09

== Personnel ==
Paul McCartney and Wings

- Paul McCartney – vocals, bass, piano, electric piano, Hammond organ, celeste, harmonium, acoustic guitar
- Linda McCartney – Moog, electric piano, Mellotron, tambourine, backing vocals
- Denny Laine – vocals, electric guitar, acoustic guitar, bass, harmonica
- Jimmy McCulloch – electric guitar, backing vocals
- Geoff Britton – drums

Additional personnel

- Howie Casey – saxophone
- Tuxedo Brass Band – brass
- Del Newman – orchestra conductor, arranger
- Geoff Emerick – sound engineer

== Charts ==
=== Weekly charts ===
Weekly chart performance for One Hand Clapping
Chart (2024)	Peak position
Belgian Albums (Ultratop Flanders)	11
Belgian Albums (Ultratop Wallonia)	7
Croatian International Albums (HDU)	18
Dutch Albums (Album Top 100)	10
French Albums (SNEP)	16
French Rock & Metal Albums (SNEP)	41
German Albums (Offizielle Top 100)	4
Italian Albums (FIMI)	85
Japanese Albums (Oricon)	11
Japanese Combined Albums (Oricon)	17
Japanese Hot Albums (Billboard Japan)	15
Scottish Albums (Official Charts)	2
Spanish Albums (Promusicae)	61
Swiss Albums (Schweizer Hitparade)	11
UK Albums (Official Charts)	10
US Billboard 200	74
US Top Rock & Alternative Albums (Billboard)	19

=== Monthly charts ===
Monthly chart performance for One Hand Clapping
Chart (2024)	Position
Japanese Albums (Oricon)	35
