= Peter Baumann (psychiatrist) =

Peter Baumann (15 August 1935 – 1 April 2011) was a Swiss psychiatrist who engendered controversy for conducting physician assisted suicides.

== Background ==
Baumann began practising as a psychiatrist in Zürich when he was 38-years-old. He employed body therapy in addition to more conventional methods and attracted attention with his comments on Swiss military psychiatry. Baumann also fought for the reputation of LSD in an organisation called "Schweizerische Ärztegesellschaft für Psycholytische Therapie" or SÄPT. Another member was the also controversial Samuel Widmer.

Suicide was a theme that occupied him for many years; in a Tages-Anzeiger article on 18 August 1973, he asked "Ist Leben freiwillig?" and discussed the relation of life and death and the right to end life. From 1998 to 2002 Baumann worked as a prescribing doctor for "Exit (Switzerland)" and sat on their ethics committee. This organisation assists the terminally ill to take lethal doses of a barbiturate (commonly Pentobarbital sodium) which can be legally prescribed by a doctor. An organisation with similar approach, but one which extends its services to non-Swiss, is the Swiss Dignitas.

Baumann left Exit to form his own organisation, Suizidhilfe, as he believed that Exit did not do enough to further the cause of the mentally ill should they decide to end their own lives. As it is not allowable to prescribe fatal doses of barbiturates for these people, he had to create suitable secure methods including the "exit bag" combined with helium or nitrous oxide.

Using such methods, Baumann assisted two people, one with an anankastic personality and a heavily depressed woman. Because of this, the public prosecution office in Basel accused him of "vermutete Beihilfe zum Suizid aus selbstsüchtigen Motiven" (supposed suicide assistance with egoistic motive). By the end of 2002, the Society of Zürich Physicians ("Zürcher Ärztegesellschaft") sought to prevent Baumann from continuing with his work, but having reached the end of his career, he left the society. He also left the Zürich Society for Psychiatry and Psychotherapy ("Zürcher Gesellschaft für Psychiatrie und Psychotherapie").

Baumann was arrested and held on remand for 2 months in Basel for alleged involvement in a case of assisted suicide in Lucerne. The basis for the allegation was a single dubious fingerprint, and Baumann was subsequently acquitted of all charges related to this. However upon his release from custody, he pledged to stop actively assisting suicide for the mentally ill until the matter had been legally clarified, but remained a consultant for his organisation "Suizidhilfe Schweiz."

Assisting suicide is legally allowed in Switzerland under certain circumstances. For the terminally ill, a doctor is allowed to prescribe a fatal dose of barbiturates. However, for those without a terminal illness, this is not allowed, although it is legal to assist these people if they are mentally competent. Baumann extended this assistance to the mentally ill, raising the question of whether they are mentally competent. He searched for freely available and “prescription-free” methods.

The programme "Rundschau" on SF 1 showed Baumann aiding the suicide of a 60-year-old depressive and wheelchair user known as Heidi T. on 15 January 2003. Unsurprisingly, it generated heated debate. Baumann was charged with having assisted her "for selfish motives" in violation of Article 115 of the Swiss criminal code. Prior to this, the "selfish motives" clause had only been used in cases in which the defendant was seeking material benefits, and not simply a desire for publicity. He was also charged with negligent homicide in two other cases. In June 2007 he was found guilty on one of the two counts of negligent homicide, in which the court decided that the patient was incompetent and incapable of judgment. This court also found him guilty seeking material benefit in the case of the televised suicide, although he was later acquitted of this charge on appeal in September 2008. As at 2010, Baumann had been sentenced to four years in jail. He subsequently received a pardon from the Basler Grossrat in 2010. He died of cancer on 1 April 2011.
