= Mumbo (song) =

Song by Wings

from the album Wild Life
- Released: 7 December 1971
- Recorded: 26 July, 1 September and 2–15 October 1971
- Length: 3:54
- Label: Apple
- Songwriters: Paul McCartney; Linda McCartney
- Producer: Paul McCartney

"Mumbo" is a song by the British-American rock band Wings, released as the opening track on their debut album WIld Life (1971).

== Background and recording ==
Recording of "Mumbo" began on 26 July 1971 as a jam started by Paul McCartney on piano and, according to him during an interview with NME a few months after the session, everyone else "just fell in" to the jam. The performers were Linda McCartney on tambourine, Denny Laine on bass, Paul on a piano that, according to engineer Alan Clarke, was out of tune, and Denny Seiwell on drums. Paul returned to "Mumbo" on 1 September, adding percussion and an electric guitar. On a Friday between 2 and 15 October, more overdubs were added, including backing vocals from Paul and Linda, organ by Paul, and more electric guitars from Laine and Paul.

== Release and reception ==
"Mumbo" appears as the opening track on Wild Life (1971), the debut album by the British-American rock band Wings. Author John Blaney states that "its raw energy more than makes up for what it lacks in lyrical content[.]" John Mendelsohn in Rolling Stone called it a "raucous rock and roll rampage that, like “Smile Away,” may be taken as a small self-send-up". Goldmine magazine critic John M. Borack called it "nothing more than a seemingly spontaneous jam captured with the tape rolling." In Record Collector, Jamie Atkins opined it to be a "sloppy bit of nonsense barroom boogie". A reprise of the track titled "Mumbo Link" appears as the final track, albeit initially unlisted until the CD reissue, when it was listed for the first time.

== Personnel ==
According to authors Allan Kozinn and Adrian Sinclair:

- Paul McCartney – tuned down piano, organ, percussion, electric guitar, lead and backing vocals
- Linda McCartney – tambourine, backing vocals
- Denny Laine – bass, electric guitar
- Denny Seiwell – drums
