= Dear Friend (Wings song) =

Song by Wings

from the album Wild Life
- Released: 7 December 1971
- Recorded: 24 July & 16 October 1971
- Studio: EMI, London
- Length: 5:53
- Label: Apple
- Songwriters: Paul McCartney; Linda McCartney
- Producer: Paul McCartney

Licensed audio
- "Dear Friend" on YouTube

"Dear Friend" is a song by the English rock band Wings, released as the penultimate track on their first studio album Wild Life (1971). Written by Paul and Linda McCartney, the song was Paul's attempt at reconciliation with his former Beatles bandmate John Lennon; the two's relationship had decayed following the break-up of the Beatles, and the pair exchanged digs at each other in their music throughout 1971, particularly in Paul's "Too Many People" and Lennon's "How Do You Sleep?".

In "Dear Friend", a piano-led ballad, McCartney shows affection for Lennon. He questions his own views on the personal and professional conflicts that had fractured their friendship. The song was recorded in a single take and features orchestration conducted by Richard Hewson. Initially receiving mixed reviews from critics, "Dear Friend" has generally been considered a highlight of the Wild Life album.

== Background and inspiration ==
After John had slagged me off in public, I had to think of a response, and it was either going to [reciprocate] – and some instinct stopped me, which I'm really glad about – or do something else. So, I worked on my attitude and wrote "Dear Friend", saying, in effect, let's lay the guns down, let's hang up our boxing gloves.

— Paul McCartney, Club Sandwich, 1994

Paul McCartney began writing "Dear Friend" during his time in the United States recording Ram (1971), a collaborative album with his wife and future bandmate Linda. The song was written in response to John Lennon's 1970 Rolling Stone interview, held after his undergoing primal therapy. By then, the Beatles had broken up, and Lennon and McCartney's relationship had soured. Lennon, who had privately left the Beatles in September 1969, was furious that McCartney had publicly announced his split from the group in April 1970; he wanted to announce his departure first. His resentment against McCartney wrought on by the announcement spilled out in the Rolling Stone interview, according to author Peter Ames Carlin. In it, Lennon tore apart the public perception of the Beatles and the Lennon–McCartney songwriting partnership, ranting frankly against much of his Beatles songs, many of the people in the group's orbit and the band's opposition to having his wife Yoko Ono in the studio. He presented McCartney as a conceited control freak and falsely stated that they had stopped writing songs together in 1962. Lennon had also called McCartney's self-named 1970 album "rubbish" on another occasion. In a 1973 interview, McCartney admitted that Lennon's comments hurt him deeply.

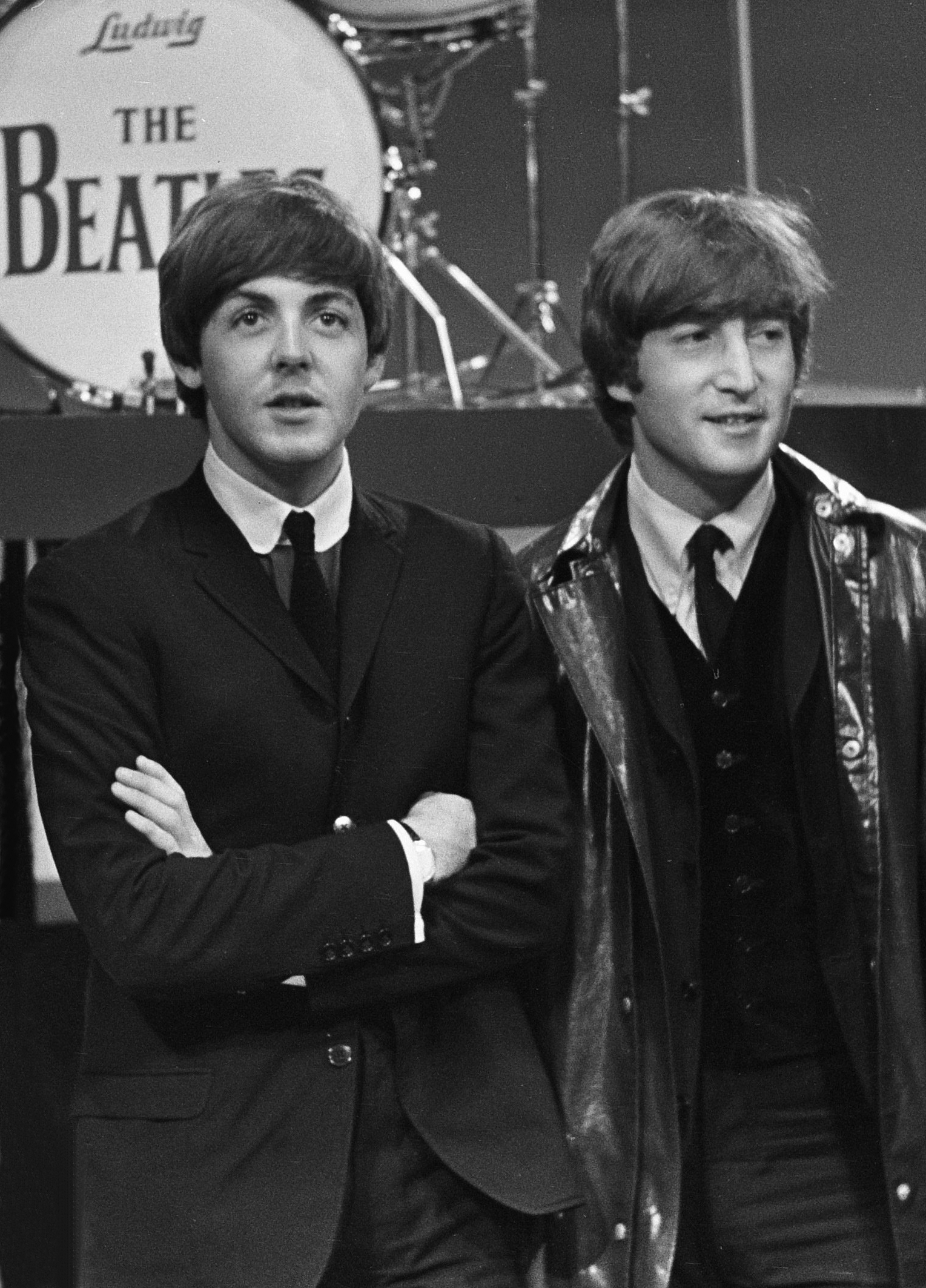
Paul McCartney (left) wrote "Dear Friend" about his relationship with John Lennon (right), which had deteriorated following the break-up of the Beatles.

McCartney responded by composing "Too Many People", whose lines such as "Too many people preaching practices" refer to his erstwhile bandmate. Following the song's release on Ram in May 1971, Lennon found other examples of McCartney attacking him and addressed them with "How Do You Sleep?", released on the album Imagine four months later. In "How Do You Sleep?", Lennon throws digs at McCartney such as the line "The only thing you done was Yesterday / And since you've gone you're just another day", which references McCartney's 1965 Beatles song "Yesterday" and his and Linda's 1971 single "Another Day". (Note: Another one of his insults on the record is "The sound you make is Muzak to my ears / You must have learned something in all those years".)

However, in December 1971, Lennon said about the song: "There's really no feud between me and Paul. It's all good, clean fun. No doubt there will be an answer to 'Sleep' on his next album, but I don't feel that way about him at all." (Note: McCartney himself would reflect: "I don't think any of us really ever got to the point where we actually hated each other's guts".) While saying at the time that "How Do You Sleep?" was "silly ... [He] says the only thing I did was 'Yesterday', and he knows that's wrong", McCartney admitted to liking Imagine. He remembered in Wings: The Story of a Band on the Run (2025) that after hearing "How Do You Sleep?", he almost wrote a song called "Quite Well, Thank You". He discarded it since he disliked the idea of writing an answer song.

Decades later, McCartney said it was a difficult period for him, as the Beatles had disbanded and Lennon, Ono and the Beatles manager Allen Klein were secretly contriving cruel things to say about him. He also admitted that Lennon was one to express cruelty in part because of his troubled childhood; his father Alfred left him and his mother Julia died early on. In his words:

[Lennon's] a lovely, lovely, crazy guy. So, when Rolling Stone started asking him questions, he’s going to unload. ... It was very difficult to read, and I had to take it with a pinch of salt. But you have to remember, I’d known John since he was a teenager. I knew he was like that. You had to forgive him and just think, 'I don’t believe it.'

Thus, McCartney responded to Lennon's insulting comments with "Dear Friend" as a way to say, "'Why don't we just sit down, shut up, and have a glass of wine. And, come on man, we've known each other too long to really get into this bullshit!'"

"Dear Friend" was McCartney's attempt at reconciliation with his friend. As he explained, it was a substitute for a peace letter written to quell their differences fomented by the Beatles' business affairs. Chip Madinger and Mark Easter also argue that "Dear Friend" is, to an extent, an answer song to Harrison's "Isn't It a Pity" from All Things Must Pass (1970), a song which Harrison referred to in his autobiography as being about "whenever a relationship hits a down point". Beatles historian Peter Doggett asserts that McCartney would not have continued arguing with Lennon, Harrison and Ringo Starr had he stayed true to the resigned spirit expressed in "Dear Friend"; however, he kept dwelling on their business problems and "talking about money", in the words of his assistant Shelley Turner. McCartney recorded multiple home demos of "Dear Friend".

== Composition and recording ==
"Dear Friend" is a piano-led ballad in C minor, featuring only verses and no chorus. With minor orchestration and brass, author Robert Rodriguez describes the song as "possibly the most musically developed" on the record. Vincent Benitez Jr. compares the song's structure to a classical music lament, emphasising the idea that McCartney missed his friend rather than pleading to end their public feud. Lyrically, McCartney conveys his affection for Lennon and challenges his interpretation of the events that fractured their relationship. Journalist Paolo Hewitt wrote that, whereas Lennon used anger in his song, McCartney was calmer in his response. Hewitt describes McCartney as the "balanced yin" to Lennon's "turbulent yang". McCartney initially refused to clarify the song's meaning. In an interview with David Jensen of Radio Luxembourg, he stated: "Lyrically—I don't know really. It's just about a dear friend, whatever it means to you", and quoted Harrison's "Isn't It a Pity" in the statement.

Shortly after the formation of Wings, the band began recording sessions for what became Wild Life at EMI Studios in London on 24 July 1971. Tony Clark and Alan Parsons engineered the sessions, and McCartney produced them. "Dear Friend" was recorded on the first day in a single take; McCartney played piano, Seiwell played a subtle drum part featuring mostly cymbal taps and swells and Laine played a basic vibraphone part using a vibraphone leftover from an orchestral session. Clark remembered: "That was one of those magical, live recordings—and they are magical when they're like that. It's a fantastic track. It's very emotional." McCartney then overdubbed a bass line. The orchestration, conducted by Richard Hewson, was recorded on 16 October 1971. According to Hewson, McCartney gave him full freedom for the arrangement, recalling that he said, "I want to put some strings on it." The orchestra featured eight violins, four cellos, four flutes, two trombones, two French horns, an oboe, a tenor saxophone and a harp. Hewson later recalled that McCartney flanged the tenor saxophone part to make it sound like two instruments.

== Release and reception ==
Wild Life was released through Apple Records on 7 December 1971, with "Dear Friend" as the album's penultimate track. (Note: "Mumbo Link" was an unlisted track on the original LP; it was named for the album's CD reissue.) Having publicly announced his departure from the group in April 1970, McCartney was vilified by its fans and the press for his perceived role in the break-up. Initial reviews of the album generally reflected this rancour from the press. Discussing "Dear Friend" in his review for Rolling Stone magazine, John Mendelsohn wrote that the song portrays McCartney as the "unjustly-hurt but nevertheless understanding golden boy", noting that it provides the framework for how McCartney's role in the break-up should be seen. More generally, the Chicago Tribune's Lew Harris derided "Dear Friend" as a "slow, sloppy, whiney attestation of love to a friend" with gay undertones. Robert Hilburn of the Los Angeles Times said the song lacks direction and never reaches its potential, ending up a "disappointing, even empty" journey. More positively, the NME's Richard Green thought the piano and vocals complement one another effectively. Mike Hennessey in Record Mirror called "Dear Friend" a classic McCartney song, highlighting its melodic and harmonic qualities. Music critic Ian MacDonald cited it as a counter-argument to the caricature of McCartney as an emotional lightweight.

Retrospectively, critics have generally considered "Dear Friend" a highlight of Wild Life. American Songwriter's Jim Beviglia wrote that it sounds more carefully composed than the rest of the album, noting that McCartney is emotionally reaching out to Lennon, wanting to know where their relationship stands and if it can be repaired. Author Andrew Grant Jackson opined that the track "show[s] the continued primacy of the feud in his life"; when comparing it to later rap feuds, he called it "pretty mild". Paolo Hewitt writes that the song is "shot through with a truly moving sense of melancholia which winningly hides some of its overwrought nature". In The Mojo Collection (2009), Jim Irvin praised "Dear Friend" as a "first-class, Paul-at-piano heart-render". Andrew Wild argued that the song's "balance between pain and love" proves McCartney is a strong vocalist when he's given "the right material" to work with. Writer Jamie Atkins wrote in a review of the 2022 half-speed master of Wild Life that the track "feels fraught and hurt, [with] Paul ricocheting through confusion, exasperation and attempts at reconciliation with his former writing partner over minor chords and doomy orchestral clangs, evoking the tight head and jangled nerves of stormy emotional weather". Reviewing the same half-speed master, Beatles author Kenneth Womack called "Dear Friend" a "veritable showstopper" and "a singular work of lasting beauty".

In 2018, to mark the reissuing of Wild Life and Red Rose Speedway (1973) as part of the Paul McCartney Archive Collection, McCartney shared two new exclusive versions of "Dear Friend", one of them a demo including only a piano part and vocal. He said in a press release: "I find it very emotional when I listen to it now. I have to sort of choke it back." He also expressed relief he reconciled with Lennon before his murder in 1980, saying, "... it would have been terrible if he'd been killed as things were at that point and I'd never got to straighten it out with him. This was me reaching out. So, I think it's very powerful in some very simple way. But it was certainly heartfelt." In his book The Lyrics: 1956 to the Present (2021), McCartney revealed that, upon reconciling, the two never personally discussed "Dear Friend", although he imagined Lennon had heard it. In a review of the album's Archive Collection reissue for Spectrum Culture, Justin Cober-Lake wrote that any version of the track "holds more emotional weight than the rest of these recordings, but feels out of place in the album".

== Personnel ==
According to the authors John Blaney, Allan Kozinn and Adrian Sinclair, except where noted:

Wings

- Paul McCartney – vocals, piano, bass
- Denny Laine – vibraphone
- Denny Seiwell – drums
- Linda McCartney – backing vocals
- Unknown musicians – orchestra (eight violins, four cellos, four flutes, two trombones, two French horns, one oboe, one tenor saxophone, one harp)

Technical

- Paul McCartney – producer
- Tony Clark – engineer
- Alan Parsons – engineer
