= Band on the Run (song) =

1974 single by Paul McCartney and Wings

- Front cover of the Denmark single

Single by Paul McCartney and Wings

from the album Band on the Run
- B-side: "Nineteen Hundred and Eighty-Five" (US); "Zoo Gang" (UK)
- Released: 8 April 1974
- Recorded: September 1973
- Studio: EMI, Lagos, Nigeria; AIR, London
- Genre: Pop rock, progressive rock
- Length: 5:09 (album); 3:50 (radio edit)
- Label: Apple
- Songwriters: Paul McCartney, Linda McCartney
- Producer: Paul McCartney

Wings singles chronology
"Jet" (1974)	"Band on the Run" (1974)	"Walking in the Park with Eloise" (1974)

Alternative cover
- Spanish cover with "Zoo Gang" on the B-side

Official audio
- "Band On The Run" on YouTube

"Band on the Run" is a song by the British–American rock band Paul McCartney and Wings, the title track to their 1973 album Band on the Run.

Released as a single in April 1974 in the US and in June 1974 in the UK, it topped the charts and sold over a million copies in 1974 in the United States, and reached number 3 in the United Kingdom. An international success, it has become one of the band's most famous songs.

A medley of three distinct musical passages that vary in style, "Band on the Run" is one of McCartney's longest singles at 5:09. The song was partly inspired by a comment that George Harrison had made during a meeting of the Beatles' Apple record label. The song-wide theme is one of freedom and escape, and its creation coincided with Harrison, John Lennon and Ringo Starr having parted with manager Allen Klein in March 1973, leading to improved relations between McCartney and his fellow ex-Beatles.

The original demos for this and other tracks on Band on the Run were stolen shortly after Wings arrived in Lagos, Nigeria, to begin recording the album. With the band reduced to a trio consisting of McCartney, his wife Linda, and Denny Laine, "Band on the Run" was recorded at EMI's Lagos studio and completed at AIR Studios in London.

== Background ==
It was symbolic: "If we ever get out of here … All I need is a pint a day" … [In the Beatles] we'd started off as just kids really, who loved our music and wanted to earn a bob or two so we could get a guitar and get a nice car. It was very simple ambitions at first. But then, you know, as it went on it became business meetings and all of that … So there was a feeling of "if we ever get out of here", yeah. And I did.

— Paul McCartney, to Clash Music in 2010

In a 1973 interview with Paul Gambaccini, McCartney stated that the lyric "if we ever get out of here" was inspired by a remark made by George Harrison during one of the Beatles' many business meetings. McCartney recalled: "He was saying that we were all prisoners in some way [due to the ongoing problems with their company Apple] … I thought it would be a nice way to start an album." (Note: Speaking to Clash Music in 2010, however, he said: "I don’t remember that being a George line. I don’t know about that.") McCartney added, referring to his inspiration for "Band on the Run": "It's a million things … all put together. Band on the run – escaping, freedom, criminals. You name it, it's there."

In a 1988 interview with Musician magazine, McCartney noted the drug busts experienced by musicians of the late 1960s and early 1970s as an inspiration for the "Band on the Run", also referencing the "desperado" image he attributed to bands like the Byrds and the Eagles as an influence. McCartney, who had been having legal trouble involving pot possession, said, "We were being outlawed for pot … And our argument on ['Band on the Run'] was 'Don't put us on the wrong side … We're not criminals, we don't want to be. So I just made up a story about people breaking out of prison.'"

According to Mojo contributor Tom Doyle, the song's lyrics, recalled through memory following the robbery of the band's demo tapes for the Band on the Run album, were altered to reflect on the band's then-current status, "stuck inside the four walls of the small, cell-like studio, faced with grim uncertainty".

"Nineteen Hundred and Eighty-Five", the closing track of the Band on the Run album, concludes with a brief excerpt of the chorus.

=== Composition ===
"Band on the Run" is a three-part medley: the AllMusic writer Stewart Mason described the last and longest section as "an effortless mélange of acoustic rhythm guitars, country-ish slide fills, and three-part harmonies on the chorus" and compared its sound to that of California rock group the Eagles. The lyrics of the entire song, however, are related: all based on the general theme of freedom and escape. Music critic Robert Christgau characterised the lyrical content of the song as "about the oppression of rock musicians by cannabis-crazed bureaucrats".

== Recording ==
The original demo recording for "Band on the Run", as well as multiple other tracks from the album, was stolen from the McCartneys while Paul McCartney and Wings were recording in Lagos, Nigeria. Robbed at knifepoint, they relinquished the demos, only recovering the songs through memory. Paul McCartney later remarked, "It was stuff that would be worth a bit on eBay these days, you know? But no, we figured the guys who mugged us wouldn't even be remotely interested. If they'd have known, they could have just held on to them and made themselves a little fortune. But they didn't know, and we reckoned they'd probably record over them."

The song was recorded in two parts, in different sessions. The first two were taped in Lagos, while the third section was recorded in October 1973 at AIR Studios in London. Orchestrator Tony Visconti was hired by McCartney, who liked his arrangements for T. Rex. Visconti was given three days to write arrangements for the whole album, including the 60-person orchestra for the title track. Visconti said that the arrangements were collaborations with McCartney, and was surprised he was not credited with his work until the 25th anniversary reissue.

== Release ==
Originally, Paul McCartney planned not to release any singles from Band on the Run, a strategy he compared to that used by the Beatles. However, he was convinced by Capitol Records vice president Al Coury to release singles from the album, resulting in the single release of "Jet" and "Band on the Run".

Al Coury, promotion man for Capitol Records, released "Jet," which I wasn't even thinking of releasing as a single, and "Band on the Run" too. He single-handedly turned [Band on the Run] around.

— Paul McCartney

"Band on the Run", backed with "Nineteen Hundred and Eighty-Five", was released in America in 1974 as the follow-up single to Paul McCartney and Wings' top-ten hit "Jet". The song was a smash hit for the band, becoming McCartney's third non-Beatles American chart-topping single, and the second with Wings. The single was later released in Britain (instead backed with "Zoo Gang", the theme song to the television show of the same name), reaching number 3 on the British charts. The song reached number 1 in both Canada and New Zealand. The song was also a top 40 single in multiple European countries, such as the Netherlands (number 7), Belgium (number 21), and Germany (number 22).

The US radio edit was 3:50 in length. The difference was largely caused by the removal of the middle or the second part of the song, as well as the verse that starts with "Well, the undertaker drew a heavy sigh …"

The single was certified Gold by the Recording Industry Association of America for sales of over one million copies. It was the second of five number-one singles for the band on the Billboard Hot 100. In 1974, Billboard ranked it number 22 on its Top Pop Singles year-end chart. Billboard also listed the song as Paul McCartney's sixth most successful chart hit of all time, excluding Beatles releases.

The song is performed in many of McCartney's live shows, with a live version being included on the 1976 live album Wings over America. In June 2022, one week after his 80th birthday, McCartney performed the song with Dave Grohl at the Glastonbury Festival. The performance was part of his Got Back tour.

=== Other releases ===
"Band on the Run" has also been featured on numerous McCartney/Wings compilation albums, including Wings Greatest (1978), All the Best! (1987), Wingspan: Hits and History (2001), Pure McCartney (2016) and Wings (2025). It was also featured on The 7" Singles Box in 2022. A different live studio take, recorded on 27 August 1974 at EMI Studios in London, was first released on the Paul McCartney Archive Collection edition of Band on the Run in 2010, and later on One Hand Clapping in 2024.

An underdubbed version of the song was released on 6 December 2023. McCartney explained "underdubbed" as follows: "When you are making a song and putting on additional parts, like an extra guitar, that's an overdub. Well, this version of the album is the opposite, underdubbed." The entire Band on the Run album was released in this manner on the 50th anniversary reissue.

== Videos ==
An independent film produced by Michael Coulson, while he was a college student in the mid-1970s, was later included in The McCartney Years video compilation as well as the 2010 re-issue of the album Band on the Run. It served mostly as a tribute to the Beatles, featuring montages of still pictures from their career. Wings were not shown. The video ends with a collage of Beatles pictures much like the album cover of Sgt. Pepper's Lonely Hearts Club Band.

In 2014, a new video for "Band on the Run" was created. The video was designed by Ben Ib, an artist who created tour visuals for Paul McCartney (as well as Roger Waters and the Smashing Pumpkins) and the cover for Paul McCartney's 2013 solo album New. In the video, all of the objects, including the "band on the run" itself, are made up of words.

== Reception ==
"Band on the Run" was praised by former bandmate and songwriting partner John Lennon, who considered it "a great song" from "a great album". In 2014, Billboard praised "Band on the Run" for having "three distinct parts that don't depend on a chorus yet still manage to feel anthemic". Cash Box said that the "excellent build to eventual power pitch, coupled with some fine music and vocals makes this another McCartney masterpiece". Record World said it "features changes galore, bringing a new dimension to top 40 radio". AllMusic critic Stewart Mason called the track "classic McCartney", lauding the song for "manag[ing] to be experimental in form yet so deliciously melodic that its structural oddities largely go unnoticed".

Paul McCartney and Wings won the Best Pop Vocal Performance by a Duo, Group or Chorus for "Band on the Run" at the 17th Annual Grammy Awards. NME ranked the song as the tenth-best song of the 1970s, as well as the fifteenth-best solo song by an ex-Beatle. In 2010, AOL Radio listeners voted "Band on the Run" the best song of McCartney's solo career. In 2012, Rolling Stone readers ranked the song as McCartney's fourth-best song of all time, behind "Maybe I'm Amazed", "Hey Jude", and "Yesterday". Rolling Stone readers also ranked the song the fifth-best solo Beatle song.

== Personnel ==
Band members

- Paul McCartney – lead and backing vocals, bass, acoustic and electric guitars, electric and acoustic piano, synthesizer, drums
- Linda McCartney – harmony and backing vocals, synthesizer
- Denny Laine – harmony and backing vocals, electric guitar

Additional personnel

- Tony Visconti – orchestrator
- 60-person orchestra

== Charts ==
=== Weekly charts ===
Chart (1974)	Peak position
Belgium (Ultratop 50 Flanders)	21
Canada Top Singles (RPM)	1
Germany (GfK)	22
Ireland (IRMA)	7
Japan (Oricon)	58
Netherlands (Dutch Top 40)	7
New Zealand (Listener)	1
South Africa (Springbok Radio SA Top 20)	2
UK Singles Chart (Official Charts Company)	3
US Billboard Hot 100	1
US Adult Contemporary (Billboard)	22

=== Year-end charts ===
Chart (1974)	Rank
Canada Top Singles (RPM)	20
Netherlands (Single Top 100)	49
South Africa	20
UK Singles Chart (Official Charts Company)	50
US Billboard Hot 100	22

== Certifications ==
Region	Certification	Certified units/sales
New Zealand (RMNZ)	2× Platinum	60,000^{‡}
United Kingdom (BPI)	Gold	500,000^{^}
United States (RIAA)	Gold	1,000,000^{^}
^{^} Shipments figures based on certification alone.^{‡} Sales+streaming figures based on certification alone.

== Cover versions ==
Since its release, "Band on the Run" has been covered by multiple artists. Former Wings member Denny Laine released a version of "Band on the Run" on his 1996 album Wings at the Sound of Denny Laine. A cover version was recorded in 2007 by the rock band Foo Fighters as their contribution to the Radio 1: Established 1967 album; on 1 June 2008 McCartney was joined onstage by Foo Fighters lead singer Dave Grohl for a special performance of the song in Liverpool. Grohl played guitar and sang backing vocals on "Band on the Run" and then played drums on Beatles songs "Back in the U.S.S.R." and "I Saw Her Standing There". A cover version by Heart was included on the 2014 tribute album The Art of McCartney. Owsley covers the song on a hidden track on his album The Hard Way. In 2023, indie-Americana group Fantastic Cat along with guest performer Butch Walker recorded a cover for the song's 50th anniversary.
