= I Am Your Singer =

Song by Wings

from the album Wild Life
- Released: 7 December 1971
- Recorded: 24 and 29–30 July 1971
- Length: 2:15
- Label: Apple
- Songwriters: Paul McCartney; Linda McCartney
- Producer: Paul McCartney

"I Am Your SInger" is a song by the English rock band Wings, released as the second song on the second side of their debut album Wild Life (1971).

== Background and production ==
"I Am Your Singer" began as a demo recorded on 2 August 1971, the same day "Uncle Albert/Admiral Halsey" was released as a single in the US.

Proper recording of "I Am Your Singer" began on 24 July, with Paul McCartney on bass, Denny Laine on electric guitar with a tremolo effect and Denny Seiwell on drums, where they recorded a total of ten takes (half of them with false starts), with the tenth and final take deemed best. The group reconvened on both 29 and 30 July to add overdubs, this time bringing the Dolmetsch Consort to add recorders for the first of two days, although only five members were brought in; Jeanne Dolmetsch Brian Blood, Peter Blood, Christine Blood and Paul Blood. On the second day, the final overdubs of the track were of Paul and Linda's vocals.

== Release and reception ==
"I Am Your Singer" was released on Wild Life, which was issued on 7 December 1971, on Apple Records, with "I Am Your Singer" sequenced as the second track on the second side of the album. It is the shortest track on the album. (Note: Excluding "Mumbo Link" and "Bip Bop Link".) A single of "Love is Strange" with "I Am Your SInger" was planned to be issued in the UK, but was cancelled, as Apple though it was not the best way for the group to be introduced in the single industry. In a review for Rolling Stone, John Mendelsohn notes that "I Am Your Singer" "represents McCartney’s most dangerous impulses run rampant", adding that "Moreover, the song’s arrangement appears to have been slapped together in a matter of seconds, as is suggested by drummer Denny Seiwell's thumping around aimlessly in a manner that suggests that the first time he heard the song was while it was being recorded", concluding by saying it "isn't even acceptable pop music". Record Mirror's Mike Hennessey called it a "short piece with attractive harmony". The Los Angeles Times writer Robert Hilburn calls it a "pleasant, but rather unconventional sound", adding that it "has a nice 'sound' to is, but little real substance". Authors Chip Madinger and Mark Easter writes that "a truly embarrassing vocal lead from Linda, it's hard to fathom why this was going to be the B-side of the cancelled single."

== Personnel ==
According to authors John Blaney, Allan Kozinn and Adrian Sinclair:

- Paul McCartney – bass, recorder, vocals
- Linda McCartney – vocals
- Denny Laine – guitar with tremolo effect, recorder
- Denny Seiwell – drums
- Jeanne Dolmetsch – recorder
- Brian Blood – recorder
- Peter Blood – recorder
- Christine Blood – recorder
- Paul Blood – recorder
