= Wiedmer =

Wiedmer is a Swiss surname. Notable people with the surname include:

- Hansruedi Wiedmer (1945), Swiss sprinter
- Noémie Wiedmer (born 2007), Swiss snowboarder
- Otto Wiedmer (1889–?), Swiss cyclist
- René Wiedmer (1936–2013), Swiss field hockey player

== See also ==
- Widmer
