= Wings (Paul McCartney and Wings album) =

Compilation album by Paul McCartney and Wings
- Released: 7 November 2025
- Recorded: 1971–1979
- Genre: Rock
- Length: 142:37 (Double-disc version); 53:24 (Single-disc version)
- Label: Capitol; UME
- Producer: Paul McCartney; George Martin ("Live and Let Die"); Chris Thomas (Back to the Egg)

Paul McCartney and Wings chronology
One Hand Clapping (2024)	Wings (2025)	Man on the Run (Music from the Motion Picture Soundtrack) (2026)

Wings is a compilation album by English–American rock band Wings, released on 7 November 2025 by Capitol Records and UME. The compilation is Wings' second compilation, but the first entirely consisting of tracks credited to them; overall it's the fifth compilation by bandleader Paul McCartney.

== Content ==
The compilation contains hits selected by Paul McCartney himself with artwork by Hipgnosis and Humphrey Ocean. The standard mixes used are remasters from the 2010s. All tracks in the set are in Dolby Atmos, which marks a first time for most tracks on the album. A thirty-two page booklet that includes interviews, rare photos and information about the band is included.

== Release and formats ==
The compilation was released on 7 November 2025 by Capitol Records and UME in 3LP, 1LP, 2CD and single CD formats, including an expanded 32-page booklet featuring photographs, artwork, paintings, trivia, and information about the band. The artwork for Wings was overseen alongside Paul by Aubrey 'Po' Powell of Hipgnosis – the design studio that worked with Paul for seven Wings albums, including Band on the Run (1973), Venus and Mars (1975), Wings over America (1976), and Wings Greatest (1978). The expanded booklet includes extensive album-by-album notes on the artwork written by Po, with additional editorial by Pete Paphides, and features original artwork by Humphrey Ocean – who first worked with Wings on some of the artwork for Wings at the Speed of Sound (1976) before being invited by Paul and Linda on tour in 1976 as their artist in residence – rendering behind-the-scenes sketches of the band. It is available in 5.1, Dolby Atmos and standard stereo.

The Blu-ray version of Wings is the first time Wings songs are available on a physical format in Dolby Atmos.

The cover depicts all the members who have been part of the band over the years, except Laurence Juber.

== Critical reception ==
Professional ratings
Review scores
Source	Rating
AllMusic	4.5/5 stars
Classic Rock	4.5/5 stars

AllMusic critic Tim Sendra said of the set "There have been other Wings collections and they were fine; this double-disc does the best job of capturing all aspects of the band's career. Anyone wanting to study pop music of the era should make this one of their first stops." Classic Rock critic Fraser Lewry said of the one-disc version that it is "heaven-sent hitsville."

== Track listing ==
=== Double CD/Triple LP version ===
==== CD 1/LP sides 1-3 ====
No.	Title	Writer(s)	Album	Length
1.	"Band on the Run"	P. McCartney, L. McCartney	Band on the Run, 1973	5:12
2.	"Hi, Hi, Hi"	P. McCartney, L. McCartney	non-album single, 1972	3:09
3.	"Silly Love Songs"	P. McCartney, L. McCartney	Wings at the Speed of Sound, 1976	5:55
4.	"Letting Go"	P. McCartney, L. McCartney	Venus and Mars, 1975	4:34
5.	"Nineteen Hundred and Eighty-Five"	P. McCartney, L. McCartney	Band on the Run, 1973	5:30
6.	"Live and Let Die"	P. McCartney, L. McCartney	Live and Let Die soundtrack, 1973	3:13
7.	"Mamunia"	P. McCartney, L. McCartney	Band on the Run, 1973	4:52
8.	"Junior's Farm"	P. McCartney, L. McCartney	non-album single, 1974	4:22
9.	"Helen Wheels"	P. McCartney, L. McCartney	non-album single, 1973	3:48
10.	"Some People Never Know"	P. McCartney, L. McCartney	Wild Life, 1971	6:38
11.	"Let 'Em In"	P. McCartney, L. McCartney	Wings at the Speed of Sound, 1976	5:11
12.	"Get on the Right Thing"	P. McCartney, L. McCartney	Red Rose Speedway, 1973	4:18
13.	"Jet"	P. McCartney, L. McCartney	Band on the Run, 1973	4:09
14.	"My Love"	P. McCartney, L. McCartney	Red Rose Speedway, 1973	4:09
15.	"Call Me Back Again"	P. McCartney, L. McCartney	Venus and Mars, 1975	5:00
Total length:				69:58

==== CD 2/LP sides 4-6 ====
No.	Title	Writer(s)	Album	Length
1.	"Getting Closer"	P. McCartney	Back to the Egg, 1979	3:24
2.	"Listen to What the Man Said"	P. McCartney, L. McCartney	Venus and Mars, 1975	4:02
3.	"I've Had Enough"	P. McCartney	London Town, 1978	3:05
4.	"Love Is Strange"	Mickey Baker, Sylvia Vanderpool, Ethel Smith	Wild Life, 1971	4:52
5.	"London Town"	P. McCartney, Denny Laine	London Town, 1978	4:11
6.	"Arrow Through Me"	P. McCartney	Back to the Egg, 1979	3:38
7.	"Venus and Mars/Rock Show"	P. McCartney, L. McCartney	Venus and Mars, 1975	3:47
8.	"She's My Baby"	P. McCartney, L. McCartney	Wings at the Speed of Sound, 1976	3:09
9.	"Bluebird"	P. McCartney, L. McCartney	Band on the Run, 1973	3:24
10.	"Deliver Your Children"	P. McCartney, Denny Laine	London Town, 1978	4:19
11.	"Let Me Roll It"	P. McCartney, L. McCartney	Band on the Run, 1973	4:49
12.	"Mull of Kintyre"	P. McCartney, Denny Laine	non-album single, 1977	4:45
13.	"Wild Life"	P. McCartney, L. McCartney	Wild Life, 1971	6:41
14.	"C Moon"	P. McCartney, L. McCartney	non-album single, 1972	4:35
15.	"With a Little Luck"	P. McCartney	London Town, 1978	5:47
16.	"Soily"	P. McCartney, L. McCartney	One Hand Clapping, 1974	3:56
17.	"Goodnight Tonight"	P. McCartney	non-album single, 1979	4:21
Total length:				72:45

=== Single CD/LP version ===
No.	Title	Length
1.	"Band on the Run"	5:14
2.	"Let 'Em In"	5:12
3.	"Jet"	4:09
4.	"With a Little Luck" (DJ edit)	3:18
5.	"Arrow Through Me"	3:37
6.	"Nineteen Hundred and Eighty-Five"	5:33
7.	"Silly Love Songs"	5:56
8.	"My Love"	4:11
9.	"Live and Let Die"	3:15
10.	"Listen to What the Man Said"	4:01
11.	"Goodnight Tonight"	4:20
12.	"Mull of Kintyre"	4:46
Total length:		53:24

== Charts ==
Chart performance for Wings
Chart (2025)	Peak position
Australian Albums (ARIA)	33
Austrian Albums (Ö3 Austria)	15
Belgian Albums (Ultratop Flanders)	26
Belgian Albums (Ultratop Wallonia)	76
Dutch Albums (Album Top 100)	26
French Albums (SNEP)	108
French Rock & Metal Albums (SNEP)	7
German Albums (Offizielle Top 100)	15
German Rock & Metal Albums (Offizielle Top 100)	4
Japanese Albums (Oricon)	28
Japanese Download Albums (Billboard Japan)	90
Japanese Rock Albums (Oricon)	4
Japanese Top Albums Sales (Billboard Japan)	26
Scottish Albums (Official Charts)	2
Swedish Physical Albums (Sverigetopplistan)	11
Swiss Albums (Schweizer Hitparade)	24
UK Albums (Official Charts)	12
US Billboard 200	68
US Top Rock & Alternative Albums (Billboard)	16
