= Samuel Widmer =

Swiss psychiatrist, psychotherapist, and author (1948–2017)

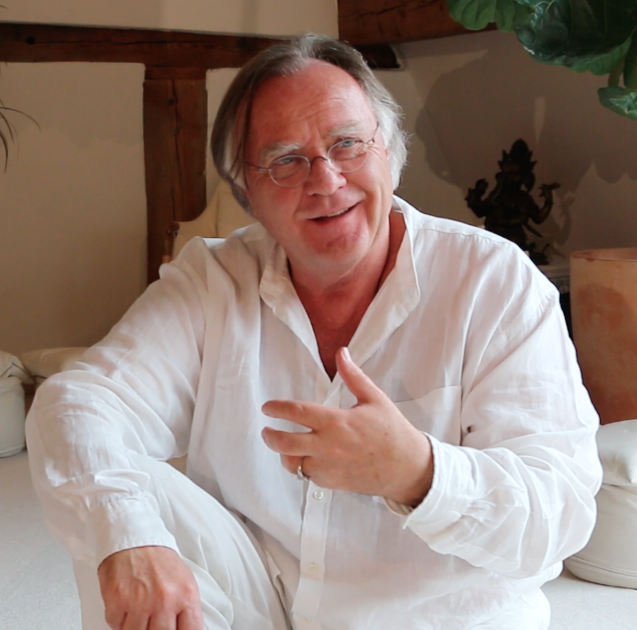
Samuel Widmer, 2016

Samuel Widmer (24 December 1948 – 18 January 2017) was a controversial Swiss physician, psychiatrist, psychotherapist and author, who used psycholytic substances in therapy and harbored liberal opinions about polygamy and other forms of free love.

Widmer was a medical specialist in psychiatry and psychotherapy FMH (Foederatio Medicorum Helveticorum), employed in his own medical practice. He lived and worked in Lüsslingen near Solothurn (Schweiz).

He was a specialist in Psychedelic psychotherapy and had special permission from the BAG (Eidgenössisches Bundesamt für Gesundheitswesen), to use MDMA and LSD in psycholytic psychotherapy from 1988 to 1994. Along with Peter Baumann, he was one of the founders of the ECBS (Europäisches Collegium für Bewußtseinsstudien) and the SÄPT – "Schweizerische Ärztegesellschaft für Psycholytische Psychotherapie“.

Widmer spoke during the Basel Psychotherapy Days (Basler Psychotherapietage). He led spiritual workshops, seminars in meditation and Tantra and meditation-voyages. Among the spiritual teachers he was inspired by were Jiddu Krishnamurti and Carlos Castaneda.

Widmer lived with two women and had children with both. A huge group of followers grew around Widmer and his wife Danièle Nicolet, including 80 adults and 55 children. Because of that, Widmer was suspected to be the leader of a cult or sect by the media.

== The Core–shell model (Kern-Schalen-Modell) ==
The basic assumptions of this theory is, that during a person’s development, “emotional layers” grow around the “essential core” of his mind. This model shall be imagined as an onion, whose core is the source of our zest for life. Around this core, a layer of pain and dolor grows throughout development, because of experienced and not worked up injuries. Because these feelings often are felt insufferable, another layer is built, the layer of defending emotions like anger, aggression, rage and defiance. For that, the child is often penalized with deprivation of love – another layer gets built, again: The layer of adaption, whose characteristics are boredom, weariness, senselessness and depression.

If a person wants to regain his ability to be happy or be happier, he had to work his way through these layers. Widmer used legal psycholytic substances to support this way to the inner core.

== Works (A selection) ==
- Aus der Stille. Short cuts to enlightenment. Basic Edition, Basel 1997, ISBN 3-906410-37-4
- Ecstasy. Die User-Fibel. Edition Heuwinkel, Geneva 1996, ISBN 3-906380-24-6
- Die Einsamkeit auf dem Weg. Meditationen. Edition Heuwinkel, Geneva 1995, ISBN 3-906410-47-1
- Essenz schauen. Vom Ruhen im Urgrund allen Seins. Basic Edition, Basel 1998, ISBN 3-9521250-3-2
- Heute wurde uns eine Tochter geboren (with Danièle Nicolet)
- Im Irrgarten der Lust. Abschied von der Abhängigkeit; die Geburt der Freude. Edition Heuwinkel, Geneva 1997, ISBN 3-906410-38-2
- Ins Herz der Dinge lauschen. Vom Erwachen der Liebe; über MDMA und LSD; die unerwünschte Therapie. Nachtschatten-Verlag, Solothurn 2002, ISBN 3-907080-03-3
- Des Kaisers Nacktheit, des Kaisers Dummheit. Von Freundschaften und Feindschaften. Basic Edition, Gerolfingen 2003, ISBN 3-9521758-9-7
- Perlen auf dem Weg
- Stell dir vor, du wärst ein Stück Natur. Edition Heuwinkel, Geneva 1995, OCLC: 75708003
1. Von der unerlösten Liebe zwischen Vater und Tochter. Vom Inzesttabu und seinen Folgen
2. Stell Dir vor, Du wärst ein Stück Natur
- Vom Allerinnersten (2005)
