= Edward L. Widmer =

American historian (born 1963)

Edward "Ted" L. Widmer
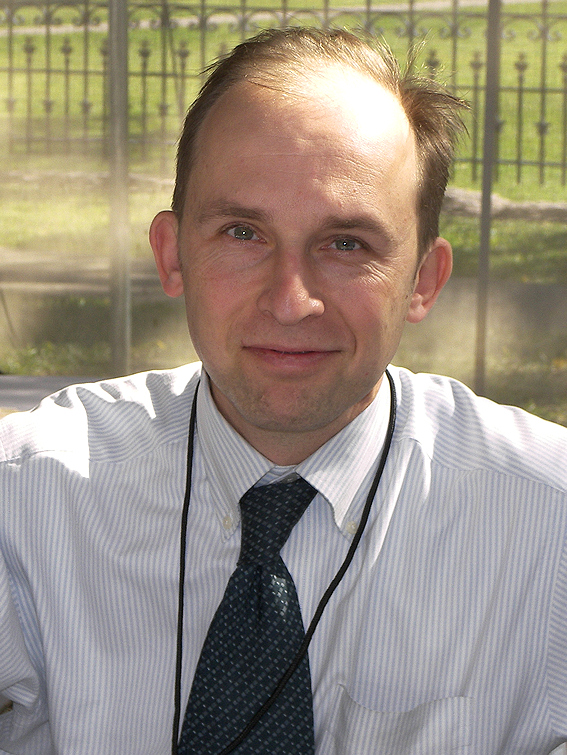
- Born: 1963 (age 62–63)
- Education: Harvard University (A.B., A.M., Ph.D.)
- Relatives: Carolyn Ladd Widmer (grandmother); Cyrus Hamlin (great-grandfather)

Edward "Ted" Ladd Widmer (born 1963) is an American historian, writer, librarian, and musician who served as a speechwriter in the Clinton White House.

He serves on boards of the Harvard Lampoon, Massachusetts Historical Society and The New England Quarterly.

== Early life and education ==
Edward Ladd Widmer was born in 1963 to Ellen and Eric Widmer. He attended the Gordon School in East Providence until 1976, then the Moses Brown School in Providence, Rhode Island, graduating in 1980. Widmer subsequently attended Harvard University where he obtained an A.B., A.M., and Ph.D. in the history and literature of France and the United States. During his time at Harvard, he was an editor at the school's humor magazine, The Harvard Lampoon.

In 1990, Widmer's research on the origin of baseball was featured in The New York Times.

In 1992 Widmer married Mary Frederica Rhinelander, a printmaker and figurative artist. Widmer was appointed a lecturer on history and literature at Harvard University in 1993 and worked in that capacity until 1997. Between 1995 until 1997, he played guitar and vocals in a Boston hard rock band, the Upper Crust.

== Career ==
From 1997 to 2001, he worked in the White House as a special assistant to President Bill Clinton, foreign policy speech writer and Senior Advisor for Special Projects, which involved advising on history and scholarship related issues. He later conducted extensive interviews with Clinton while the former president was writing his autobiography.

In 2001, Widmer was appointed the inaugural director of the C.V. Starr Center for the Study of the American Experience at Washington College. From 2001 to 2006, he served concurrently as an associate professor of history at the college. During his tenure, Widmer established the George Washington Book Prize, an annual award for literature on the founding era of the United States.

On July 1, 2006, Widmer was appointed Director and Librarian of the John Carter Brown Library at Brown University. At the library, he led efforts to digitize the library's holdings and raised funding to save Haitian libraries in the wake of the 2010 earthquake. From 2012 to 2013, Widmer was a senior advisor to U.S. Secretary of State Hillary Clinton. Between 2010 and 2015, he helped to create and often contributed to The New York Times' series "Disunion," which focused on the Civil War.

In October, 2016, Widmer was appointed Director of the John W. Kluge Center at the Library of Congress.

In 2018, he joined the faculty of Macaulay Honors College as a lecturer where he has led courses on Walt Whitman and The People of New York.

Windmer was the editor of the 2025 book Wings: The Story of a Band on the Run with Paul McCartney about McCartney's rock band Wings. It was published by Liveright in the U.S. and the Penguin Books imprint Allen Lane in November 2025.

== Books ==
- Young America: The Flowering of Democracy in New York City. Oxford University Press. 1998. ISBN 9780195356571.
- Campaigns: A Century of Presidential Races from the Photo Archives of the New York Times. DK. 2001. ISBN 9780789471352. (Introduction by Alan Brinkley)
- Martin Van Buren (The American Presidents series). Henry Holt and Company. 2005. ISBN 9780805069228.
- Ark of the Liberties: America and the World. Farrar, Straus and Giroux. 2008. ISBN 9780809027354. (later editions titled Ark of the Liberties: Why American Freedom Matters to the World)
- Listening In: The Secret White House Recordings of John F. Kennedy. Grand Central Publishing. 2012. ISBN 9781401305253. (foreword by Caroline Kennedy)
- Brown: The History of an Idea. W. W. Norton. 2015. ISBN 9780500252161.
- Disunion: Modern Historians Revisit and Reconsider the Civil War from Lincoln's Election to the Emancipation Proclamation. Running Press. 2013. ISBN 9781579129286. (edited with Clay Risen and George Kalogerakis) (later editions titled Disunion: A History of the Civil War)
- Lincoln on the Verge: Thirteen Days to Washington. Simon & Schuster. 2020. ISBN 9781476739434. (winner of the Harold Holzer Lincoln Forum Book Prize in 2020)
- McCartney, Paul (2025). Wings: The Story of a Band on the Run. Allen Lane. ISBN 9780241758571. (edited by Widmer)
- The Living Declaration: A Biography of America's Founding Text. Library of America. 2026. ISBN 9781598538441.
