= Eric Widmer =

American scholar and educator

Eric George Widmer (January 16, 1940 – January 18, 2025) was an American scholar and educator. He was born in Lebanon where his American mother was on the faculty of the American University in Beirut. He was educated at Deerfield, Williams, and Harvard. After finishing his Ph.D, he joined the faculty at Brown teaching Chinese History and would then go on to spend much of his career there as a dean. He then served as Deerfield Academy's 54th Headmaster from 1994 to 2006, and was succeeded in that post by Margarita O'Byrne Curtis. He left the school to assume the position of founding headmaster at King's Academy in Madaba, Jordan, which began its first academic year in fall 2007. He spoke six languages including French and Chinese.

He was married to Meera Viswanathan, a longstanding member of the East Asian studies and comparative literature departments at Brown University, who now serves as Head of School at the Ethel Walker School. His children included the historian and writer Ted Widmer.

His mother, Carolyn Ladd Widmer, was the first Dean of the University of Connecticut School of Nursing (1942–1967).

Widmer died January 18, 2025 in Simsbury, Connecticut.
