= Gabrielle Oberhänsli-Widmer =

- Born: 16 June 1957; Menziken, Kulm District, Canton of Aargau, Switzerland
- Education: University of Zurich
- Known for: Hebrew literature
- Spouse: Rainer Oberhänsli-Widmer
- Scientific career
- Fields: Rabbinic literature, Hebrew literature, Israeli literature, Jewish literature
- Workplaces: University of Zurich, University of Jena, University of Bern, University of Freiburg, Abbey of the Dormition
- Thesis: La complainte funèbre du haut moyen âge français et occitan (1989)

Gabrielle Oberhänsli-Widmer (born 16 June 1957, Menziken, Switzerland), is Professor of Jewish studies at the University of Freiburg.

== Biography ==
She studied the French and Hebrew languages at Zürich, Florence, Avignon, Lausanne and Lucerne, earning all three levels: Licentiate, Doctorate and Habilitation. She continued her studies at the Hebrew University of Jerusalem. After these, she worked as lecturer, adjunct professor and privatdozent in Hebrew language, Medieval French literature and history of religions. She was visiting scholar for Jewish studies at the University of Jena (1999-2000) and at the University of Bern (2003-2004). Since 2004, she has been professor and head of department for Jewish studies at the university of Freiburg, Germany. From 2008 to 2015, she was head of the Faculty of Oriental Studies at the university of Freiburg together with Ulrich Rebstock.

She is editor of the scientific journals Judaica of the ZIID – Zurich Institute for Interreligious Dialogue, Kirche und Israel and Jahrbuch für Biblische Theologie (JBTh) and member of the managing board of the Jüdisch-Christliche Arbeitsgemeinschaft (Jewish-Christian workgroup) at Zürich.

== Books ==
- Oberhänsli-Widmer, Gabrielle (1 January 1989). La complainte funèbre du haut moyen âge français et occitan. Romanica Helvetica (in French). Vol. 106. Bern: Francke. ISBN 978-3772016752. OCLC 21872928.
- Oberhänsli-Widmer, Gabrielle (1 March 1998). Biblische Figuren in der rabbinischen Literatur. Gleichnisse und Bilder zu Adam, Noah und Abraham im Midrasch Bereschit Rabba. Judaica et christiana (in German). Vol. 17. Bern: Peter Lang AG, Internationaler Verlag der Wissenschaften. ISBN 978-3906759661. OCLC 39543653.
- Oberhänsli-Widmer, Gabrielle (31 December 2016). Hiob in jüdischer Antike und Moderne. Die Wirkungsgeschichte Hiobs in der jüdischen Literatur (in German). Neukirchen-Vluyn: Neukirchener. ISBN 978-3788731717. OCLC 52869439.
- Oberhänsli-Widmer, Gabrielle (7 March 2013). Bilder vom Bösen im Judentum: Von der Hebräischen Bibel inspiriert, in jüdischer Literatur weitergedacht (in German). Vandenhoeck & Ruprecht GmbH & Co. KG. ISBN 978-3788726713. OCLC 835077253.
- Oberhänsli-Widmer, Gabrielle (23 May 2018). Lege mich wie ein Siegel an deinen Arm!: Jüdische Lebenswelten im Spiegel ihrer Liebesliteratur. Judentum und Christentum (in German). Vol. 25. Stuttgart: Kohlhammer W., GmbH. ISBN 978-3170349544. OCLC 1042906662.

== Selected publications ==
- Oberhänsli-Widmer, Gabrielle (2009). "... so sind wir Esel" Die Eselin des Rabbi Pinchas ben Ja'ir (BerR 60,8) und die Rolle der Esel im Judentum von biblischer Zeit bis in die Gegenwart (PDF) (in German). ISBN 978-3-9809932-4-1.
- Oberhänsli-Widmer, Gabrielle (2007). Bilder vom jüdischen Jenseits oder: Wie kleiden sich die Toten? (PDF) (in German). ISBN 978-3-7887-2242-5.
- Oberhänsli-Widmer, Gabrielle (2007). Hiobtraditionen im Judentum (PDF) (in German). ISBN 978-3-290-17407-1.
- Oberhänsli-Widmer, Gabrielle (2006). Elija als Pate des Bundes, oder die Dynamik rabbinischer Rezeption (PDF) (in German). ISBN 978-3-17-018877-8.
- Oberhänsli-Widmer, Gabrielle (2003). "Schafft Gott das Böse? Schöpfung und Sündenfall biblisch, talmudisch und kabbalistisch gelesen" (PDF) (in German).

== Editorships ==
- Brocke, Edna; Henrix, Hans Hermann; Hoffmann, Daniel; Oberhänsli-Widmer, Gabrielle; Stegemann, Ekkehard W.; Stegemann, Wolfgang (eds.). "Kirche und Israel". Kirche und Israel Kui; Neukirchener Theologische Zeitschrift (in German). Vandenhoeck & Ruprecht. ISSN 0179-7239.
- Fischer, Irmtraud; Strobel, Ulriken; Frey, Jörg; Fuchs, Ottmar; Janowski, Bernd; Koerrenz, Ralf; Leppin, Volker; Nicklas, Tobias; Oberhänsli-Widmer, Gabrielle; Poplutz, Uta; Sattler, Dorothea; Schmid, Konrad; Thomas, Günter; Vollenweider, Samuel; Welker, Michael (eds.). "Jahrbuch für Biblische Theologie". Kirche und Israel Kui; Neukirchener Theologische Zeitschrift (in German). Vandenhoeck & Ruprecht. ISSN 0179-7239.
- Bloch, René; Bodenheimer, Alfred; Brasser, Martin; Domhardt, Yvonne; Ernst, Hanspeter; Kaufmann, Uri Robert; Oberhänsli-Widmer, Gabrielle; Schreiner, Stefan; Schumacher, Jutta; Starobinski-Safran, Esther; Willi, Thomas (eds.). "Judaica: Beiträge zum Verstehen des Judentums". Judaica: Beiträge zum Verstandnis des Judischen (in German and English). Zürcher Institut für Interreligiösen Dialog. ISSN 0022-572X.
