= Carolyn Ladd Widmer =

American academic administrator (1902–1991)

- Born: January 19, 1902; Randolph, Vermont
- Died: January 10, 1991 (aged 88); Windham, Connecticut
- Education: Wellesley College (B.A.); Yale University (B.A.); Trinity College (M.A.)
- Relatives: Cyrus Hamlin (grandfather); Eric Widmer (son); Edward L. Widmer (grandson)
- Medical career
- Profession: Academic dean
- Field: Nursing education Academic administration
- Institutions: University of Connecticut; American University of Beirut

Carolyn Ladd Widmer (January 19, 1902 – January 10, 1991) was an American nurse educator and academic administrator who served as the first dean of the University of Connecticut School of Nursing. She held this position for twenty-five years (1942–1967).

== Career and education ==
Widmer was born in Randolph, Vermont, on January 19, 1902. Her parents were George Ladd, a clergyman, and Mary Hamlin, daughter of Cyrus Hamlin, founder of Robert College and president of Middlebury College.

Widmer earned her bachelor's degree from Wellesley College in 1923. She was a member of Phi Beta Kappa. Following stints as a pathology research assistant in Boston and a laboratory instructor at the University of Vermont, she entered Yale University School of Nursing in 1929. In late 1929, she spent several months as a public health organizer in Bogota, Colombia. After graduating as a registered nurse, Widmer became a head nurse in Yale New Haven Hospital.

Appointed on the recommendation of Mary Beard, Widmer served as nursing school dean and nurse supervisor at the American University of Beirut in Lebanon, from 1932 to 1938. After returning to the United States to avoid the instability brought on by World War II, she directed the nursing refresher program at Yale New Haven Hospital in 1942.

== UConn ==
The entry of the United States into World War II prompted a surge in demand for nurses and a scramble by the State of Connecticut to satisfy the need. Appointed by UConn president Albert N. Jorgensen on the recommendation of Annie Warburton Goodrich, Widmer became the first director (and a year later, dean) of the UConn School of Nursing in August 1942. She built and continually revised the curriculum, hired faculty (the first of whom was Josephine Dolan), and worked with hospitals to establish clinical experiences for students. The school graduated its first bachelor's degree cohort in 1947 and established a Sigma Theta Tau honor society chapter in 1955. In 1949 the National Committee for the Improvement of Nursing Services ranked UConn in the top 25% of nursing schools nationwide. Widmer also laid the foundations for a graduate nursing program, launched in 1971.

By the time Widmer retired, the school had grown from 13 students in 1942 to 483 students (and 38 faculty) in 1967.

While dean, Widmer commuted to study at Trinity College, earning a master's degree in education in 1951.

== Legacy ==
After retirement, Widmer remained active in the national nursing community as well as local organizations near her home in Storrs. She served nearly seven years as executive secretary for Sigma Theta Tau. She served as president of the Mansfield Historical Society, the Windham Hospital Auxiliary, and the Connecticut Nurses Association. She was a member of the State Board of Examiners for Nursing and the Connecticut League of Nursing Education. In addition to her professional service, Widmer received a Distinguished Alumna Award from Yale University (1975) and an honorary award from the Connecticut Nurses Association (1967).

Opened in 2012, the Carolyn Ladd Widmer Wing of Storrs Hall (site of the nursing school) was named in her honor. The Widmer Wing is a 15,800-square-foot space built at the cost of $14 million and housing a large classroom, study hall, clinical simulation rooms, and exam rooms. The nursing school's former home was the Carolyn Ladd Widmer Building, built in 1919 originally for service as the college infirmary, from 1950 to 1996, when the building was closed and demolished.

Each year, the UConn School of Nursing issues the Carolyn Ladd Widmer Outstanding Alumni Award for Leadership in Nursing.

== Personal life ==
During her sojourn in Beirut, Widmer met Robert Widmer, whom she married on April 27, 1934. They had two sons, Eric Widmer and Michael Widmer.

Widmer died in Windham on January 10, 1991. She was survived by both her sons.
