= Tomorrow (Paul McCartney song) =

1971 song by Wings

Song by Wings

from the album Wild Life
- Released: 7 December 1971
- Recorded: July–August 1971
- Genre: Pop
- Length: 3:28
- Label: Apple
- Songwriters: Paul McCartney, Linda McCartney
- Producer: Paul McCartney

"Tomorrow"

Single by David Cassidy

from the album Home Is Where the Heart Is
- B-side: "Half Past Your Bedtime"
- Released: July 1976 (South Africa)
- Genre: Pop
- Length: 3:32
- Label: RCA
- Songwriters: Paul McCartney, Linda McCartney
- Producers: Bruce Johnston, David Cassidy

"Tomorrow" is a song by the British band Wings from their debut album Wild Life, released in December 1971. It was written by band members Paul McCartney and Linda McCartney. In 1976, American singer David Cassidy had a hit with his cover version of the song.

== Composition and recording ==
Paul McCartney had taped a demo of "Tomorrow" before he and Linda began recording their album Ram in New York City in late 1970. The song is a piano ballad and ends with a gospel-style coda, which is played at a slower tempo than the main portion. The composition is in the key of D major. According to author Robert Rodriguez, McCartney's lyrics "[extol] optimism in the face of yesterday's sorrows", while Tom Doyle likens the song to a sequel to "Yesterday", as McCartney reveals his insecurity and "plead[s] with his lover not to let him down".

Wings recorded the basic track for the song between 25 and 27 July 1971 at Abbey Road Studios in London. Overdubs on this and other songs from the band's debut album took place in August. According to drummer Denny Seiwell's recollection, McCartney played piano on the basic track and Denny Laine played bass; he says Linda might also have played some piano.

== Release and reception ==
Apple Records released Wild Life on 7 December 1971. "Tomorrow" was sequenced as the penultimate track, ahead of "Dear Friend", McCartney's song of reconciliation towards his former Beatles bandmate John Lennon. The album received highly unfavourable reviews from music critics. Writing in Rolling Stone, John Mendelsohn said that "Tomorrow" was "archetypal post-Beatles McCartney: banal, self-celebrating lyrics full of many of the most tired rhymes in Western pop; glossy, if unfocussed production; pretty, eminently Muzakable melodies". By contrast, Billboard's reviewer highlighted the track as one of the album's four "triumphs".

Beatles biographer Nicholas Schaffner said that, although the song was among the "one or two half-decent tunes" on Wild Life, it was "suffocated by Linda's gloppy oohs and aahs unaccountably mixed as high as the lead vocal". Howard Sounes identifies it and "Dear Friend" as the album's "only two interesting songs". In his book on the former Beatles' careers from 1970 to 1980, Rodriguez includes "Tomorrow" in a chapter covering the best "unsung" McCartney songs. He describes it as a composition that "evoked his Beatle triumphs, or at least McCartney's stronger cuts" and says that had it been released as a single, the song might have created more public interest in Wild Life.

In 1975, McCartney recorded an instrumental version of "Tomorrow" in the reggae style, which, according to author Luca Perasi, appears to be a musical parody. The track began circulating on bootleg compilations, paired with "Proud Mum", an instrumental that McCartney recorded as an intended advertising jingle for Mother's Pride bread. In a 1976 interview with Paul Gambaccini, McCartney said that "Tomorrow" was one of the Wild Life tracks that had become well known to "freaks" and "connoisseurs". He also recalled that Lee Eastman, Linda's father, had urged him to re-record it at a much slower tempo. Some sources claim that McCartney recorded a new version of "Tomorrow" in 2011 with Diana Krall. As of 2013, neither the 1975 instrumental nor the rumoured duet with Krall had been officially released. McCartney included the 1971 Wings recording on the 2001 compilation Wingspan: Hits and History. The song was also rerecorded for the One Hand Clapping Live Sessions in August 1974, although it was not officially released until 2024.

== Personnel ==
Personnel per Andrew Grant Jackson:

- Paul McCartney – vocals, piano
- Denny Laine – guitar, bass guitar
- Denny Seiwell – drums
- Linda McCartney – backing vocals

== David Cassidy cover ==
"Tomorrow" became a hit for David Cassidy in 1976. It was released a single from his album Home Is Where the Heart Is. The song was produced by Bruce Johnston.

The song reached number 10 in South Africa. McCartney remarked about Cassidy's cover of "Tomorrow" as taking the song to its ultimate potential.

=== Chart history ===
Chart (1976)	Peak position
South Africa (Springbok)	10
