= Wings: The Story of a Band on the Run =

2025 book by Paul McCartney

- Editor: Ted Widmer
- Author: Paul McCartney
- Language: English
- Genre: Non-fiction
- Publisher: Liveright / Allen Lane
- Publication date: November 2025
- Pages: 550
- ISBN: 978-1-324-09630-6

Wings: The Story of a Band on the Run is a 2025 book by Paul McCartney edited by music historian Ted Widmer about McCartney's rock band Wings. It was published by Liveright in the U.S. and the Penguin Books imprint Allen Lane in November 2025.

The book has been described as an oral history of the band with the publisher stating that it "sheds new light on the immediate aftermath and seismic global impact" of the break-up of the Beatles. The book was set to feature 100 photographs, many of which had been unseen. Ahead of the publication McCartney said that he was "so very happy to be transported back to the time that was Wings and relive some of our madcap adventures through this book".

== Reception ==
Kenneth Womack, in a review of the book for Salon.com, wrote that, "If nothing else, Wings: The Story of a Band on the Run offers a powerful rejoinder to the band's critics—and there were many in the 1970s who queued up in hopes of seeing McCartney's post-Beatles experiment fail." Marc Weingarten of the Los Angeles Times wrote: "The book's best stuff is to be found at the start, when the superstar was making his first baby steps toward renewed relevance, and then found it."
