= John Mendelsohn (musician) =

American drummer

- Born: Washington, D.C.
- Occupations: writer, journalist, musician, graphic designer

John Ned Mendelsohn is an American writer, journalist, musician and graphic designer.

== Biography ==
Mendelsohn, who has sometimes spelled his name as Mendelssohn with two s's, was born in Washington but moved with his parents to southern California aged six months. He lived briefly in the San Fernando Valley, but mostly on the coast, first in Playa del Rey, and later above Pacific Coast Highway just south of Topanga Canyon Boulevard on Sunset Mesa. He studied at the University of California, Los Angeles, thus avoiding military service in the Vietnam War.

Mendelsohn began contributing music criticism to the Los Angeles Times and Rolling Stone while still a student. Although he was an ardent champion of the Kinks and David Bowie, the best known of these early contributions are his unfavorable reviews of the first two Led Zeppelin albums, which were published in Rolling Stone in 1969. His review of Led Zeppelin II displayed the sarcastic wit that became a characteristic of Mendelsohn's writing style, exemplified by his assertion that "Jimmy Page is the absolute number-one heaviest white blues guitarist between 5’4" and 5’8" in the world." Mendelsohn cited the British critic Nik Cohn as a major influence on his own writing, calling him "screamingly funny" and saying that "my own star began to rise very quickly after I perfected my imitation of him". When Ritchie Yorke wrote an article disparaging Mendelsohn and other rock critics, Mendelsohn, responding in the February 1971 issue of Phonograph Record, justified his dispassionate approach and said that "Rolling Stone suspects" he would even "give God a bad review".

While continuing to contribute album reviews, Mendelsohn launched a music career in the early 1970s. Together with bass player Ralph William Oswald, with whom he'd played in a succession of ragtag college groups (including recording a demo album with a nascent Sparks), he formed a serious version of their group Christopher Milk in mid-1970. With Mendelsohn primarily serving as lyricist, the group recorded for United Artists and Warner Bros. Records before disbanding in 1973. As a musician and composer, Mendelsohn released an EP on Greg Shaw's Bomp label, titled John Mendelsohn's the Pits, in 1975. Rhino released a package comprising his authorized autobiography, I, Caramba, and a compilation of song demos, Masturpieces, in 1995.

In 1984, Mendelsohn's biography of the Kinks, Kinks Kronikles, was published. Between stints with Rolling Stone, Mendelsohn contributed to Creem in the mid-1980s; later, he wrote for Playboy, Wired and Mojo. He worked in graphic design and website design from the late 1990s through the mid-2000s.

In 2002, Mendelsohn relocated to the United Kingdom to reside there with his English second wife Claire, during which he composed and produced his own solo album, Sex With Twinge, and Mistress Chloe's much-praised Like a Moth to Its Flame. Over the course of the next half-decade, he composed and produced albums for Sadie Sings and Do Re Mi Fa (Cough) and published three books (Dominatrix: The Making of Mistress Chloe, Waiting for Kate Bush, and Gigantic: The Pixies and Frank Black), in addition to working on a great deal of unpublished fiction and several teleplays. He directed and starred in two scripted sketch comedy revues, The Ministry of Humour and Clear & Present Rangers.

Mendelsohn departed the UK in late 2007. He spent 10 months in the Midwest before buying a home in New York's Hudson Valley, where, between November 2008 and November 2009, he composed, performed, and recorded his second solo album, Sorry We're Open, released in February 2010. Now living back in London after two years in Los Angeles, Mendelsohn regularly blogs on his web journal, "For All in Tents and Porpoises", in which he writes his thoughts on various elements of pop culture, personal anecdotes including frank accounts of his lifelong struggles with low self-esteem and depression, and satirical political pieces in which he purports to have embraced conservatism and the policies of Sarah Palin.
