= Rockshow =

1980 film by Paul McCartney

- Theatrical release poster
- Produced by: Bob Mercer
- Starring: Paul McCartney; Linda McCartney; Denny Laine; Jimmy McCulloch; Joe English
- Cinematography: Jack Priestley
- Edited by: Robin Clarke
- Music by: Wings
- Production company: MPL Communications
- Distributed by: Miramax Films
- Release dates: November 26, 1980 (premiere screening); January 30, 1981 (NY commercial release); March 27, 1981 (LA commercial release)
- Running time: 125 minutes (unedited cut); 102 minutes (edited cut)
- Country: United States
- Language: English

Rockshow is a 1980 American concert film released by Paul McCartney and Wings, filmed during the band's Wings Over the World tour (1975–1976). The film, recorded on the North American leg, features 30 songs from segments of four concerts of the tour: New York, on May 25 (four songs); Seattle, Washington, June 10 (five songs); and Los Angeles, California, June 22 (fifteen songs) and June 23 (six songs). However, both the cover of the home video release and McCartney, in his intro to The McCartney Years DVD, acknowledge only the Seattle concert. Other recordings of the tour were released, such as the triple live album Wings over America (1976) and the Wings Over the World television documentary (1979). This is also the first film released by Miramax Films.

== Production ==
The music for what was to become Rockshow and part of Wings Over the World was produced by Chris Thomas and engineered by Phil McDonald during 1979. However, the processing of the Rockshow overdubs was obviously completed by the airdate of Wings Over the World, as these same performances were featured in both productions. Not all of the songs made it to the film in their entirety ("Medicine Jar" and "Letting Go" have been edited), and the song introductions did not always match the performance that followed. For example, several of the introductions came from the Seattle performance while the actual song was taken from a Los Angeles show: "Magneto & Titanium Man", "Spirits of Ancient Egypt", "Lady Madonna", "Let 'Em In", and "Soily". The introduction of the horn section was a composite as well with portions coming from Seattle and the final Los Angeles show.

== Release ==
The film premiered on November 26, 1980 at the Ziegfeld Theatre in New York; McCartney did not attend, as he was in the studio at the time. He did attend the London Premiere at the Dominion Theatre in Piccadilly Circus on April 8, 1981. The film was later edited down to 102 minutes for its home video release. Its first home video release was on Betamax in October 1981, with a VHS, laserdisc, and CED release in 1982. This would be the last time a feature-length version of the film would be available to the general public until 31 years later, as McCartney had remained reluctant to make the entire film available on VHS or DVD. In 2007, a shortened cut with only seven songs was released as part of The McCartney Years DVD set – one of which, a version of the Beatles' "Lady Madonna", was originally left out of the Rockshow home video release.

=== 2013 re-release ===
In June 2013, a new version of the film was released. The longer 125-minute version was digitally restored from the 35mm negative with the soundtrack remixed in 5.1 surround sound. The film had a limited worldwide cinema re-release on May 16, 2013, with an exclusive introduction and interview with McCartney. An exclusive VIP premiere screening, with McCartney in attendance and introducing the film, took place at BAFTA on May 15. This restored cut was released on DVD and Blu-ray in June 2013.

== Song listing ==
The following list is for the full-length, 125-minute version of Rockshow.

* Songs edited out of the first home video versions of the film.
+ Songs included in The McCartney Years DVD box set.

1. "Venus and Mars" +
2. "Rock Show" +
3. "Jet" +
4. "Let Me Roll It"
5. "Spirits of Ancient Egypt" (lead vocal Denny Laine)
6. "Medicine Jar" (lead vocal Jimmy McCulloch)
7. "Maybe I'm Amazed" +
8. "Call Me Back Again" *
9. "Lady Madonna" * +
10. "The Long and Winding Road" *
11. "Live and Let Die"
12. "Picasso's Last Words (Drink to Me)" *
13. "Richard Cory" (lead vocal Denny Laine) *
14. "Bluebird" +
15. "I've Just Seen a Face"
16. "Blackbird"
17. "Yesterday"
18. "You Gave Me the Answer"
19. "Magneto and Titanium Man"
20. "Go Now" (lead vocal Denny Laine)
21. "My Love" *
22. "Listen to What the Man Said" +
23. "Let 'Em In"
24. "Time to Hide" (lead vocal Denny Laine)
25. "Silly Love Songs"
26. "Beware My Love"
27. "Letting Go"
28. "Band on the Run"
29. "Hi, Hi, Hi"
30. "Soily"
