= Love in Song =

Single by Wings

from the album Venus and Mars
- A-side: "Listen to What the Man Said"
- Released: 16 May 1975
- Recorded: 7 November 1974 – 10 March 1975
- Studio: Abbey Road Studios, London; Sea-Saint Studios, New Orleans; Wally Heider Studios, Los Angeles; Sunset Sound Recorders Studio, Los Angeles
- Genre: Rock
- Length: 3:04
- Label: Capitol
- Songwriters: Paul McCartney, Linda McCartney
- Producer: Paul McCartney

Wings singles chronology
"Junior's Farm" (1974)	"Love in Song" (1975)	"Letting Go" (1975)

Venus and Mars track listing
- 13 tracks Side one: 1. "Venus and Mars"; 2. "Rock Show"; 3. "Love in Song"; 4. "You Gave Me the Answer"; 5. "Magneto and Titanium Man"; 6. "Letting Go"; Side two: 7. "Venus and Mars (Reprise)"; 8. "Spirits of Ancient Egypt"; 9. "Medicine Jar"; 10. "Call Me Back Again"; 11. "Listen to What the Man Said"; 12. "Treat Her Gently/Lonely Old People"; 13. "Crossroads Theme"

"Love in Song" is a song credited to Paul and Linda McCartney that was released on Wings' 1975 album Venus and Mars. It was also released as the B-side of Wings' number 1 single "Listen to What the Man Said." It has been covered by artists such as Helen Merrill and the Judybats.

== Writing and recording ==
"Love in Song" was initially written on Paul McCartney's 12 string guitar, and McCartney has claimed the song "just came to him." It was one of the early songs recorded for Venus and Mars, at Abbey Road Studios in London in November 1974. String overdubs were added at Wally Heider Studios in Los Angeles on March 10, 1975. In addition to playing 12 string guitar and singing lead vocals, Paul McCartney plays upright bass, using the same bass that Bill Black played on Elvis Presley hits such as "Heartbreak Hotel." Denny Laine and Jimmy McCulloch also play guitar, and Linda McCartney sings backing vocals. "Love in Song" is one of the few Venus and Mars songs on which Geoff Britton plays drums, as the song was recorded before he was replaced as Wings' drummer by Joe English.

== Personnel ==
- Paul McCartney – vocals, bass, piano, hand bells, string arrangements
- Linda McCartney – hand bells, moog synthesizer, backing vocals
- Denny Laine – electric guitar, piano, backing vocals
- Jimmy McCulloch – 12 string guitar
- Geoff Britton – drums, milk bottles
- Sid Sharp Strings – bass, celli, viola, violins
- Gayle Levant – harp
- Tony Dorsey – string arrangements

== Lyrics and music ==
Several critics have described "Love in Song" as having a melancholy quality. The first and third verses express a degree of sadness, as the singer cries out to his lover in the first verse and he sings of sadness that resulted from a misunderstanding in the third. In contrast, in the second and fourth verses the singer sings of how everything is fine when he has his love. In the bridge, the singer remembers a time when he and his lover were happier. McCartney biographer Peter Carlin describes the song as a "portrait of heartbreak," claiming it "traced the thin line between love and obsession."

Author Robert Rodriguez describes the song as a "delicate ballad." Beaver County Times critic Bob Bonn described the melody as "mysterious sounding." Music professor Vincent Benitez describes the song's key as G Aeolian, a melancholy key. Author John Blaney describes the arrangement as "measured," claiming that contributes the singer distancing himself from the subject, although he believes that McCartney's warm vocal "more than compensates for the song's guarded tone."

== Reception ==
Rodriguez considers "Love in Song" to be one of McCartney's "better efforts," although he claims that it is neglected today. Rough Guide to The Beatles author Chris Ingham considers it a "luxurious acoustic ballad." Rolling Stone critic Paul Nelson found "Love in Song" to be one of several "banal ballads" on Venus and Mars. Music critic Richard Tozier described the song as a "formal, yet easily palatable ballad."

The song was featured on The 7" Singles Box in 2022.

== Cover versions ==
Helen Merrill covered "Love in Song" on the 2005 album Love Is Song. The Judybats covered it on the 2001 album Listen to What the Man Said: Popular Artists Pay Tribute to the Music of Paul McCartney.
