= Call Me Back Again =

Song by Wings

from the album Venus and Mars
- Published: McCartney Music Ltd./ATV Music Ltd.
- Released: 27 May 1975
- Genre: Soul blues
- Length: 4:58
- Label: Capitol Records
- Songwriters: Paul McCartney, Linda McCartney
- Producer: Paul McCartney

Venus and Mars track listing
- 13 tracks Side one: 1. "Venus and Mars"; 2. "Rock Show"; 3. "Love in Song"; 4. "You Gave Me the Answer"; 5. "Magneto and Titanium Man"; 6. "Letting Go"; Side two: 7. "Venus and Mars (Reprise)"; 8. "Spirits of Ancient Egypt"; 9. "Medicine Jar"; 10. "Call Me Back Again"; 11. "Listen to What the Man Said"; 12. "Treat Her Gently/Lonely Old People"; 13. "Crossroads Theme"

"Call Me Back Again" is a song credited to Paul and Linda McCartney and performed by Wings. It was originally released on the album Venus and Mars. It was performed throughout their world tours in Australia and America and a live version was included on the album Wings Over America. It was also included on the compilation album Wingspan: Hits and History. The song was also included on the theatrical version of the film Rockshow, documenting the Wings 1976 tour, but was excluded from the laserdisc version of the film.

The song was also used as McCartney's entry on the iTunes exclusive 4-track Beatles EP 4: John Paul George Ringo, released in 2014.

== Writing and lyrics ==
McCartney primarily wrote the song at the Beverly Hills Hotel in Beverly Hills, California in 1974 and completed the song in New Orleans, Louisiana, where most of the recording sessions for Venus and Mars, including those for "Call Me Back Again," took place. Although the song does not reference the city of New Orleans, it is one of the few songs on Venus and Mars to portray the influence of the city. The song is a bluesy New Orleans-style soul ballad. Paul Nelson of Rolling Stone described it as being "well-sung" and "urban-blues-and-Sixties-soul-influenced." The lyrics tell of the singer's grief that his girlfriend no longer returns his phone calls. Although the phone calls from his girlfriend used to bring him joy, now that she stopped returning his calls he pleads for her to call him back again. Another interpretation, by Ultimate Classic Rock contributor Nick DeRiso, is that the lyrics were directed at McCartney's former bandmate John Lennon. Allmusic critic Donald A. Guarisco compares the lyrics to lyrics in classic singles by such soul singers as Wilson Pickett and Otis Redding.

== Music ==
"Call Me Back Again" is in the key of F major and in 12/8 time. The structure is relatively simple, alternating the verse and the refrain, with an intro and an outro at the beginning and end. The melody incorporates gospel music elements. The song incorporates a prominent horn part arranged by Tony Dorsey. Other instrumentation includes what Guarisco describes as "searing guitar riffs and pulsating piano lines."

McCartney's vocal performance has received considerable praise from critics. John Blaney describes his singing as "a killer vocal that underlines a recording to relish," which "has a depth of emotion rarely equaled and reveals what a supreme vocalist he is." Guarisco described his singing as "a wild-eyed wail of a vocal that is a perfect blend of soulful grit and rock energy." Vincent Benitez particularly praised the vocal performance in the outro, stating that "McCartney shines as a bluesy vocal soloist, ad-libbing as the music fades out." In the book The Rough Guide to the Beatles, Chris Ingham noted a similarity between McCartney's vocal in "Call Me Back Again" and that in the Beatles' song "Oh! Darling," although he considered "Call Me Back Again" to be "an inert sludge rocker." Author Tim Riley also remarked on the similarity between "Call Me Back Again" and "Oh! Darling." Robert Rodriguez, calling the song "a piano-based soul shouter" took the "Oh! Darling" analogy further, stating that it "fully achieved what the Fabs' 'Oh! Darling' only hinted at, with a full-throated vocal unheard since the coda of 'Hey, Jude' seven years before." McCartney himself stated "I ended up just sort of ad-libbing a bit, stretching out a bit. I like that myself. I had a chance to sing."

== Personnel ==
- Paul McCartney – vocals, bass, clavinet, string arrangement, piano
- Linda McCartney – Mellotron flutes
- Denny Laine – electric guitar, backing vocals
- Jimmy McCulloch – electric guitar
- Joe English – drums
- Tony Dorsey – horn arrangement
- Steve Howard – trumpet
- Clyde Kerr – trumpet
- John Longo – trumpet
- Michael J. Pierce – alto saxophone
- Alvin Thomas – alto saxophone
- Carl Blouin – baritone saxophone
