= Treat Her Gently/Lonely Old People =

"Treat Her Gently"/"Lonely Old People"

Song by Wings

from the album Venus and Mars
- Released: 27 May 1975
- Recorded: 25 January 1975
- Studio: Sea-Saint Recording Studios, New Orleans
- Length: 4:21
- Label: Capitol
- Songwriters: Paul McCartney; Linda McCartney
- Producer: Paul McCartney

Venus and Mars track listing
- 13 tracks Side one: 1. "Venus and Mars"; 2. "Rock Show"; 3. "Love in Song"; 4. "You Gave Me the Answer"; 5. "Magneto and Titanium Man"; 6. "Letting Go"; Side two: 7. "Venus and Mars (Reprise)"; 8. "Spirits of Ancient Egypt"; 9. "Medicine Jar"; 10. "Call Me Back Again"; 11. "Listen to What the Man Said"; 12. "Treat Her Gently/Lonely Old People"; 13. "Crossroads Theme"

"Treat Her Gently" and "Lonely Old People" is a medley of two songs by the English rock band Wings that make up the twelfth track together as one track of their fourth studio album Venus and Mars (1975).

== Background ==
"Treat Her Gently/Lonely Old People" was one of the first songs McCartney had written for Venus and Mars before recording sessions for the album began. McCartney primarily wrote the medley about old people, and wrote "Treat Her Gently" first before "Lonely Old People". Paul McCartney said of "Lonely Old People":

It is a bit of a British joke that I thought might be too much of a British joke, but I'd still like to put it out. If you don’t get the joke on it, it sounds like a closing theme. Sort of like 'Ladies and Gentlemen, Miss Diana Ross!['] and Diana walks off with the orchestra going (sings a triumphant exit song)… But if you see the joke, it comes after 'Lonely Old People', nobody asked us to play, they're wondering what’s going on, spending time, nobody gets involved with lonely old people. One of the big things for lonely old people in England is to watch Crossroads. That was it, just a joke at the end."

He also said:

I wrote the "Treat Her Gently" bit as I fell into the key of D and once I was in D, I thought, "Well, how do I get out of this?" And so I wrote the second half of the thing. It just fell together. They just fell into each other, and I wrote it as I was practising the other, almost.

The initial recording of the song took place at Sea-Saint Recording Studios in New Orleans on 25 January 1975. Paul McCartney sang the vocal while playing piano, and new Wings drummer Joe English played drums. Wings' guitarists Denny Laine and Jimmy McCulloch did not take part in the session. According to engineer Alan O'Duffy:

It was piano and drums, and that was it. And Paul singing live. Paul was singing a love song to his lovely wife [Linda], sitting beside her at the piano, live. I mean, at the time we were just doing a take, but when you look back that was special, and beautiful.

At the end of this session, Paul McCartney recorded his bass guitar part by direct injection. Working with Paul McCartney at this session, and spending time binding with Paul and Linda after the session ended help English overcome his reluctance to join the band. According to English:

I remember going into the studio with [Paul] and watching how he worked. It was like a quilt – he just wove things together. I'd sit back and go, "You couldn't buy this. What an opportunity."

Dorsey's string arrangement was recorded on 10 March 1975. The orchestra consisted of 14 violins, 2 violas, 2 cellos, 1 double bass and a harp. Later that week, Paul and Linda McCartney along with Denny Laine recorded the harmony vocals, Paul overdubbed a celesta part and replaced his piano part, and Jimmy McCulloch overdubbed some electric guitar parts between the harmony vocal lines near the end of the song.

== Music and lyrics ==
The lyrics of the "Treat Her Gently" section tell someone to treat a particular possibly senile old lady with kindness. The lyrics of the "Lonely Old People" section describe a pair of elderly people living out their lives in a nursing home. McCartney biographer John Blaney described it as "an essay in physical and mental disintegration" that "conveys the sense if alienation and loneliness may experience as they get old. He compared it to the Beatles' "Eleanor Rigby", stating that it "has real compassion and points to the pleasures and companionship of love, even if it is set in a bleak urban landscape" while "Eleanor Rigby" "hints at the emptiness of old age" and invokes more finality to the bleakness.

McCartney biographers Allan Kozinn and Adrian Sinclair described "Treat Her Gently/Lonely Old People" as "a gently wistful, ruminative piece." The two sections of the song are in different metres. "Treat Her Gently" is in quadruple metre while "Lonely Old People" is in triple metre.

Both sections of the song are in the key of D major. The "Treat Her Gently" section ends in the key of A major, which is the dominant key to D major, and which leaves the section sounding open ended. Music professor Vincent P. Benitez interprets this as suggesting that the last line of the section, "You'll never find another way", may or may not be true. The "Lonely Old People" section is more sophisticated harmonically. The verses are supported by D major. F-sharp minor, B minor. D major 6th over A, and G major chords. The chorus of "Lonely Old People" incorporates F-sharp diminished seventh chords, which Benitez interprets as increasing the harmonic intensity and thus highlighting the "fragile nature of the two people mentioned in the text". The song ends on the tonic of D, and Benitez's interpretation is that the "tonal stability" this produces suggests that "the protagonists have accepted the reality of their twilight years." Tony Dorsey, who worked on the orchestral arrangement of the song stated:

[McCartney] breaks all the rules. He invents such unusual chord changes that [the] first time you hear them you think "Did he really mean that?" His writing is so simple yet so meaningful, it's good, logical music. There's good and bad in all music, and the trick is to be able to sort it out, to take the good and throw out the bad. This is what Paul does so well.

Jim Beviglia noted a similarity to the Beatles song "Hey Jude" during the sing-along chorus.

== Release and reception ==
The Medley of "Treat Her Gently" and "Lonely Old People" was sequenced as the penultimate track on their fourth album Venus and Mars (1975), and was well received. Beviglia placed it at number 3 in his ranking if the 5 best songs on Venus and Mars, stating that "the song is so astute in its observations about the elderly, making it a kind of spiritual cousin in that regard to John Prine's 'Hello in There'." Benitez Jr writes that it is "not disjunct entities joined haphazardly but two related units, with the second song emerging smoothly from the first." Beviglia called it an "unheralded McCartney composition, one that has somewhat slipped through the cracks when people talk about his best work." Music journalist Andrew Wild described it as a "beautiful, gentle, soothing but bittersweet song", stating that it is "another neglected gem from the McCartney back catalogue."

An excerpt from "Treat Her Gently/Lonely Old People" was incorporated into the television commercial shot by Karel Reisz in support of the album.

== Credits and personnel ==
According to The Paul McCartney Project:

- Paul McCartney – bass, celeste, piano, producer, strings arrangement, vocals
- Linda McCartney – backing vocals
- Denny Laine – backing vocals
- Jimmy McCulloch – electric guitar
- Joe English – drums
- Sid Sharp Strings – bass, cello, violas, violins
- Gayle Levant – harp
- Tony Dorsey – strings arrangement
