= Wings Over the World =

1979 television film

- Country of origin: United Kingdom
- Original language: English

Production
- Running time: 73 minutes
- Production company: MPL Communications

Original release
- Network: CBS
- Release: 16 March 1979
- Network: BBC2
- Release: 8 April 1979

Wings Over the World is a 1979 television music documentary film featuring the rock band Wings. It consists of concert performances from their acclaimed Wings Over the World tour of 1975–1976, together with behind-the-scenes footage. Also included is a short excerpt of Wings rehearsing at London's Institute of Contemporary Arts before their 1972 UK university tour. Problems with the audio from the 1976 live performances delayed the film's release until 16 March 1979 in the United States (on CBS) and 8 April 1979 in the United Kingdom (on BBC2), by which time, band members Jimmy McCulloch and Joe English had left the group and been replaced.

In 2013, the film was released on DVD as part of the deluxe edition of the Wings over America live album.

== Program content ==
Chapters as per the DVD

1. "Jet" (live)
  "Bip Bop" / "Hey Diddle" (Scotland, 6 June 1971)
  "Lucille" (first Wings rehearsals)
2. "Maybe I'm Amazed" (live)
  [Wings at Elstree, July 1975]
  "Live and Let Die" (live)
3. [Glasgow, Scotland]
  [Perth, Australia]
  "Band on the Run"
  "Letting Go" (live)
4. "You Gave Me the Answer"
  [Sydney]
  "Honey Don't" / "Yesterday" (soundcheck)
  "Yesterday" (live)
5. "The Long and Winding Road"
  "Silly Love Songs" (soundcheck)
  "Magneto and Titanium Man" (live)
6. "Silly Love Songs" (live)
  "The Long and Winding Road"
7. "Go Now" (live)
8. "Beware My Love" (live)
  "The Long and Winding Road"
  Let 'Em In (live)
9. "Band on the Run" (live)
  [Seattle]
10. "Venus and Mars/Rock Show" (live)
  [Los Angeles]
11. "Hi, Hi, Hi" (live)
12. "Soily" (live)
  "Listen to What the Man Said" (credits)

== Sources ==
- Badman, Keith (2001). The Beatles Diary Volume 2: After the Break-Up 1970–2001. London: Omnibus Press. ISBN 978-0-7119-8307-6.
- Clayson, Alan (2003). Paul McCartney. London: Sanctuary. ISBN 1-86074-482-6.
- McGee, Garry (2003). Band on the Run: A History of Paul McCartney and Wings. Lanham, MD: Rowman & Littlefield. ISBN 978-0-87833-304-2.
- Madinger, Chip; Easter, Mark (2000). Eight Arms to Hold You: The Solo Beatles Compendium. Chesterfield, MO: 44.1 Productions. ISBN 0-615-11724-4.
- Rodriguez, Robert (2010). Fab Four FAQ 2.0: The Beatles' Solo Years, 1970–1980. Milwaukee, WI: Backbeat Books. ISBN 978-0-87930-968-8.
- Sounes, Howard (2010). Fab: An Intimate Life of Paul McCartney. London: HarperCollins. ISBN 978-0-00-723705-0.
- Woffinden, Bob (1981). The Beatles Apart. London: Proteus. ISBN 0-906071-89-5.
