= Spirits of Ancient Egypt =

Song by Wings

from the album Venus and Mars
- Released: 27 May 1975
- Recorded: 23 January 1975
- Studio: Sea-Saint Recording Studio, New Orleans
- Genre: Psychedelic music; ballad
- Length: 2:58
- Label: Capitol
- Songwriters: Paul McCartney; Linda McCartney
- Producer: Paul McCartney

Venus and Mars track listing
- 13 tracks Side one: 1. "Venus and Mars"; 2. "Rock Show"; 3. "Love in Song"; 4. "You Gave Me the Answer"; 5. "Magneto and Titanium Man"; 6. "Letting Go"; Side two: 7. "Venus and Mars (Reprise)"; 8. "Spirits of Ancient Egypt"; 9. "Medicine Jar"; 10. "Call Me Back Again"; 11. "Listen to What the Man Said"; 12. "Treat Her Gently/Lonely Old People"; 13. "Crossroads Theme"

"Spirits of Ancient Egypt" is a song by the English-American rock band Paul McCartney and Wings from their 1975 album Venus and Mars. Denny Laine sings lead vocals on the track.

== Background ==
"Spirits of Ancient Egypt" was written after Paul McCartney read a tome on the history of Egypt, Secrets of the Great Pyramid by Peter Tompkins, which had been recommended to him by Chet Atkins. Although the idea of a song based on ancient history appealed to him, McCartney could not come up with a story line after beginning the chorus with the lines "Spirits of ancient Egypt/Shadows of ancient Rome". Instead, he ended the chorus with the lines "Hung on the tele/hung on the tele/hung on the telephone", which do not flow from the opening lines of the chorus speaking of ancient Egypt and Rome. Similarly, he started each verse with the line "You're my baby" or "I'm your baby" but continues the verses with lines that don't connect to the opening, such as "You could sell an elevator to Geronimo".

== Composition and recording ==
An initial attempt was made to record the song at recording sessions at Sea-Saint Recording Studios in New Orleans between 20 and 22 January 1975. Laine sang a guide vocal and played electric guitar, Paul McCartney played bass guitar, Linda McCartney played organ and Geoff Britton played drums. The band was dissatisfied with the result, and particularly felt that the drumming was not inventive or interesting enough.

On 23 January, more recordings were made. Jimmy McCulloch, who missed the earlier sessions due to issues with his work visa, joined on electric guitar. Britton had quit the band and Joe English was brought in as a session musician to do the drumming. McCartney was pleased with English's drumming. According to McCartney biographers Allan Korzinn and Adrien Sinclair, English recognized that McCartney was looking to capture the New Orleans sound and played his drum part alternating "between sparse African rhythm and a funky rock pattern." At these sessions, Laine struggled getting the lead vocal to his satisfaction, particularly the high G in the chorus which was outside his vocal range.

Overdubbing was done in mid-February, with Paul McCartney adding Moog, guitar and guitar with Gizmotron effects, Linda McCartney adding synthesized strings, English adding a gong to the beginning of the track, and the whole band adding vocal harmonies. In addition, a telephone busy signal was recorded to include at the end of the song. In mid-March, the lead vocal was recorded, with Paul McCartney joining Laine on the chorus to cover the high G.

"Spirits of Ancient Egypt" is set in the key of E major. The verses move between E major and its subdominant of A major, but the chorus varies the harmony a little more. Music professor Vincent Benitez described the music as being a "blues-flavored rocker".

== Live performances ==
"Spirits of Ancient Egypt" was included in the set list for the Wings Over the World tour from the start of the tour, initially as one of two vocal showpieces for Laine along with "Go Now". A live version of the song recorded at the 10 June 1976, show in Seattle, Washington was included on the 1976 live album Wings Over America. This version contains an extended guitar solo.

== Reception ==
Beatle biographer John Blaney described the song as "a pedestrian rocker" but said it "was saved by a lyric as surreal as a Dali painting. Ottawa Citizen xritic Bill Provick said that "It works surprisingly well, mainly because of the contrasts – much like something found along Abbey Road". New York Daily News critic Josh Mills praised it as "different and very, very nice", noting especially that "singing is especially moving, and unlike anything Paul has done recently." Author Peter Ames Carlin stated that it "evoked shimmery kinds of mystery, but to no discernible end. The spirits get hung up on the telephone and we’re left with someone making dinner with a pound of love." Messenger-Press critic Steve Wosahla called it a "mediocre [effort] that should have been eliminated" from Venus and Mars. Shreveport Journal critic Charles Ray called it a "not-so-hot tune", particularly criticizing the "innocuous" lyrics. Ultimate Classic Rock critic Nick DeRiso rated it as Laine's 9th best song, stating that McCartney's "counterpoint vocal" is "great" and particularly praising the live version from Wings over America.

== Personnel ==
The personnel is as follows:

- Paul McCartney – bass, backing vocals, electric guitar, synthesiser, gizmo, moog
- Linda McCartney – organ, synthesiser, backing vocals, string machine
- Denny Laine – electric guitar, vocals
- Jimmy McCulloch – guitar, vocals
- Joe English – backing vocals, drums, gong
- Alan O'Duffy – backing vocals
