= Venus and Mars/Rock Show =

"Venus and Mars"/"Rock Show"

Single by Wings

from the album Venus and Mars
- B-side: "Magneto and Titanium Man"
- Released: 27 October 1975 (US); 28 November 1975 (UK)
- Recorded: 29 January 1975 ("Venus and Mars"); 27 January 1975 ("Rock Show")
- Studio: Sea-Saint Studios
- Genre: Arena rock; psychedelia
- Length: 3:46 (single version); 6:51 (album version)
- Label: Capitol
- Songwriters: Paul McCartney; Linda McCartney
- Producer: Paul McCartney

Wings singles chronology
"Letting Go" (1975)	"Venus and Mars"/"Rock Show" (1975)	"Silly Love Songs" (1976)

Venus and Mars track listing
- 13 tracks Side one: 1. "Venus and Mars"; 2. "Rock Show"; 3. "Love in Song"; 4. "You Gave Me the Answer"; 5. "Magneto and Titanium Man"; 6. "Letting Go"; Side two: 7. "Venus and Mars (Reprise)"; 8. "Spirits of Ancient Egypt"; 9. "Medicine Jar"; 10. "Call Me Back Again"; 11. "Listen to What the Man Said"; 12. "Treat Her Gently/Lonely Old People"; 13. "Crossroads Theme"

"Venus and Mars"/"Rock Show" is a medley of two songs written by Paul and Linda McCartney and originally performed by Wings that make up the first two songs of the album Venus and Mars. The single was released in the United States on 27 October 1975 and in the United Kingdom on 28 November 1975. The B-side is "Magneto and Titanium Man", another track from the album. The single version is considerably shorter than the album version of the songs; in the single "Rock Show" is cut by more than 3 minutes and "Venus and Mars" is cut by a few seconds. "Venus and Mars/Rock Show" peaked at number 12 on the Billboard Hot 100 in the US, but did not chart on the UK singles chart, the first McCartney penned single to do so. In the book The Rough Guide to the Beatles, Chris Ingham praised both songs, describing "Venus and Mars" as "atmospheric" and "Rock Show" as "barnstorming".

== Music and lyrics ==
"Venus and Mars" is an acoustic, folk-like song representing the perspective of a concertgoer waiting for the show to start. Originally when the song was released fans believed the title referred to Paul and Linda. Paul has denied this, stating that the song "is about an imaginary friend who's got a girlfriend who's the kind of person who asks what your sign is before they say hello. That's it: 'A good friend of mine studies the stars.' In fact, in the first verse it's 'a good friend of mine follows the stars,' so it could be ambiguous: a groupie or an astrologer." The song is in the key of D major.

Asked whether "Venus and Mars" has any astrological or astronomical significance, McCartney gave a longer explanation:

It's really a total fluke. I was just sitting down and started singing anything and some words came out. And I got this whole idea...well, the bit on the second side came first...and I got this idea about a fellow sitting in a cathedral waiting for this transport from space that was going to pick him up and take him on a trip. The guy is a bit blotto and starts thinking about 'A good friend of mine studies the stars, Venus and Mars are all right tonight.'

And the next bit was 'Your ruling star is in ascendancy today', but 'Venus and Mars are all right' was better, it flipped off the tongue. I thought, well, I know Venus and Mars are planets, so I can't go wrong there.

But afterwards, somebody said to me, did I know that Venus and Mars were our closest neighbors, and I said, wow, you live and learn. And then somebody told me Venus and Mars have just eclipsed the sun, or something. I'm not exactly sure, you'll have to check up with Patrick Moore. But they did something and aligned themselves exactly for the first time in 2,000 years. I swear I had no idea about all this going on. It was just stuff that happened afterwards.

"Rock Show" is a harder arena rock song. The chorus of "Rock Show" mentions concerts at Amsterdam's Concertgebouw, New York's Madison Square Garden, and Los Angeles' Hollywood Bowl. The verses include musical references such as "Silly Willy with the Philly band" and Jimmy Page's guitar, and the Rainbow Theatre. In addition to the normal Wings line-up, Allen Toussaint played piano on this song. "Rock Show" is in the key of A major. A major is the dominant key of D major, the key of "Venus and Mars".

== Reception ==
Cash Box said that "McCartney again demonstrates a remarkable aptitude as not only a writer and performer, but as a producer." Record World said that "McCartney gets the chance to flex his vocal muscles after a brief prelude on this ode to the road."

== Personnel ==
"Venus and Mars"

- Paul McCartney – lead vocals, bass guitar, acoustic guitar, piano, finger cymbals
- Linda McCartney – piano
- Denny Laine – moog synthesizer, acoustic guitar, sitar
- Jimmy McCulloch – electric guitar, 12-string guitar
- Joe English – drums
- Tony Dorsey – clarinet

"Rock Show"

- Paul McCartney – lead vocals, bass guitar, Mellotron M400, synthesizer, hand bells
- Linda McCartney – harmony vocals, Hammond B-3 organ, Moog synthesizer, hand bells
- Denny Laine – electric guitar, harmony vocals, hand bells
- Jimmy McCulloch – acoustic guitar, Moog synthesizer, electric guitar, hand bells
- Joe English – drums
- Kenneth "Afro" Williams – congas
- Allen Toussaint – piano

Hand Bells are only played on the album version (Credits from 2014 Deluxe Venus and Mars Remaster)

"Venus and Mars (Reprise)"

- Paul McCartney – vocals, bass, guitar, Mellotron, Moog synthesizer, string arrangements
- Linda McCartney – piano
- Jimmy McCulloch – 12 string guitar
- Geoff Britton – cymbals
- Gayle Levant – harp
- Tony Dorsey – string arrangements

== Releases ==
"Venus and Mars" also has a reprise that appears on the Venus and Mars album, which serves to open the second side of the LP record. The reprise incorporates some science fiction lyrics and sound effects, reflecting McCartney's reading Isaac Asimov at the time the song was recorded.

The single version of the medley has been released on the compilation albums Wingspan: Hits and History (2001), and the deluxe editions of Pure McCartney (2016) and Wings. The single edit was also included on The 7" Singles Box in 2022. Both songs are also included on the live album Wings Over America, combined in a medley with "Jet".

In 2014 the medley was covered by Kiss on The Art of McCartney covers album.

== Track listing ==
- UK 7" R6010
1. "Venus and Mars" / "Rock Show" (single edit) – 3:46
2. "Magneto and Titanium Man" – 3:16

== Charts ==
=== Weekly charts ===
Chart (1975–1976)	Peak position
Canada Top Singles (RPM)	12
Japan (Oricon)	99
US Billboard Hot 100	12
