= Wings over America =

Live album by Wings
- Released: 10 December 1976
- Recorded: 7 May – 23 June 1976; October–November 1976 (studio overdubs)
- Venue: Various
- Studios: Abbey Road, London (overdubs)
- Genre: Rock
- Length: 115:33
- Label: Capitol
- Producer: Paul McCartney

Wings chronology
Wings at the Speed of Sound (1976)	Wings over America (1976)	London Town (1978)

Singles from Wings over America
- 1. "Maybe I'm Amazed" Released: 4 February 1977

Wings over America is a triple live album by the British–American rock band Wings, released in December 1976. The album was recorded during the American leg of the band's 1975–76 Wings Over the World tour. It peaked at number 8 on the UK Albums Chart and reached number 1 on the US Billboard Top LPs & Tape chart.

In addition to including many of McCartney's hits with Wings, the album features performances of five of his Beatles songs: "Yesterday", "Lady Madonna", "I've Just Seen a Face", "Blackbird" and "The Long and Winding Road". The album cover was designed by Hipgnosis – who were nominated in 1978, together with McCartney's production company MPL, for a Grammy Award for Best Album Package for this album – and depicts an airliner about to open its cabin door. Wings over America was remastered and reissued as part of the Paul McCartney Archive Collection in May 2013.

== Recording ==
Originally, Wings over America was to be a two-record set of highlight performances, but this was rethought due to the success of a bootleg titled Wings from the Wings, which was released as a triple record set on red, white, and blue vinyl, and contained the entire 23 June 1976 concert recorded at the Forum in Los Angeles. This caused McCartney to release the album as a three-record set, compiled from various shows from the band's North American tour during May–June 1976. McCartney's sound engineer listened to 800 hours of tape and selected the five best performances of each song from the 30-song set list. McCartney chose and mixed the final set of recordings, mostly taken from the 23 June show. "Soily" was recorded on 7 June 1976 at McNichols Sports Arena in Denver. The live recordings then received studio overdubs during October–November 1976. According to Wings drummer Joe English, "it took forever to get those 'Wings over America' tapes ready for the live album. We had to go into the studio and overdub most of the backing vocals."

== Release ==
Wings over America was issued six months after the end of the band's US tour. It was another commercial success for Wings, reaching number 1 in the US in early 1977 (the last in a five-album stretch of consecutive chart-topping albums for the band) and number 8 in the UK. For the five Beatles songs included, McCartney reversed the songwriting credit to McCartney–Lennon. Years later John Lennon's widow, Yoko Ono, complained about the same songwriting credit on McCartney's Back in the U.S. album, but neither Lennon nor Ono publicly voiced any disapproval about the change made in 1976.

Wings over America was the first triple set by a group to reach number 1 in the US, and was a critical success. "Maybe I'm Amazed" was released as a single on 4 February 1977, peaking at number 10 on the Billboard Hot 100 in the US, and at number 28 on the UK chart.

== Reception ==
Professional ratings
Review scores
Source	Rating
AllMusic	3/5 stars
American Songwriter	4/5 stars
Consequence of Sound	B
The Essential Rock Discography	6/10
MusicHound	2/5
PopMatters	6/10 stars
Rolling Stone	(favourable)
The Rolling Stone Album Guide	3.5/5 stars
Ultimate Classic Rock	7/10
Uncut	7/10

In a retrospective review, AllMusic critic Stephen Thomas Erlewine explained the wild success of the triple album: "The Beatles mystique was still very much attached to record and artist alike – at the time, John Lennon had seemingly burnt out a major chunk of his talent, George Harrison was losing his popular edge and had done a disastrous 1974 American tour, and no one was expecting great things from Ringo Starr – and it seemed like McCartney represented the part of the group's legacy that came closest to living up to fans' expectations. Thus the album ended up selling in numbers, rivaling the likes of Frampton Comes Alive! and other mega-hits of the period."

Two related releases followed the album: the TV documentary Wings Over the World and a film titled Rockshow, purporting to contain a complete show from Seattle. Although publicity material presented Rockshow as a document of this Seattle concert, it contains only five songs that were filmed at Seattle's Kingdome; the remainder of the film's 30 songs come from the band's New York and Los Angeles shows. Limiting their relevance, however, these additional releases appeared three and four years, respectively, after the 1976 live album.

== Reissues ==
Wings over America was issued as a double-compact disc in 1984 on Columbia. (Note: US Columbia C2K 37990) The album was first released in the UK on compact disc on 26 May 1987 by Parlophone. (Note: UK Parlophone CDPCSP 720) Along with McCartney's Ram and Tug of War albums, Wings over America was reissued in the US on compact disc on 18 January 1988. (Note: US Capitol CDP 7 46715 2/CDP 7 46716 2) The album was issued by EMI two more times on CD, in 1989 (Note: UK Parlophone CZD 292) and on 19 February 1990. (Note: Europe Parlophone CDS 7 46715 8) A 1999 reissue of the album by Toshiba-EMI in Japan reinstated the three-disc format from the original LP issue, and is the only edition of the album to do this. (Note: Japan Toshiba-EMI TOCP-65507) Up to this point, the Japanese CD edition was the only one that was remastered. On 14 April 2008, the album was released as a digital download on both iTunes and Amazon. It was removed for some time from digital music sites in 2010 and 2011, but as of August 2011 it was available for sale on iTunes.

The album was reissued on 27 May 2013 as part of the Paul McCartney Archive Collection. The reissue was accompanied by the Record Store Day exclusive edition of "Maybe I'm Amazed" EP. Rockshow was also reissued, this time on DVD and Blu-ray, with its audio remixed into 5.1, on 10 June 2013.

== Track listing ==
All tracks are written by Linda McCartney and Paul McCartney, except where noted.

Side one
No.	Title	Writer(s)	Notes	Length
1.	"Venus and Mars/Rock Show/Jet"		Recorded in Cincinnati, 27 May 1976.	9:56
2.	"Let Me Roll It"		Recorded in Cincinnati, 27 May 1976.	3:51
3.	"Spirits of Ancient Egypt"		Recorded in Seattle, 10 June 1976.	4:04
4.	"Medicine Jar"	Jimmy McCulloch, Colin Eric Allen	Recorded in Cincinnati, 27 May 1976.	4:02

Side two
No.	Title	Writer(s)	Notes	Length
1.	"Maybe I'm Amazed"	Paul McCartney	Recorded in Kansas City, 29 May 1976.	5:10
2.	"Call Me Back Again"		Recorded in Cincinnati, 27 May 1976.	5:04
3.	"Lady Madonna"	Paul McCartney–John Lennon	Recorded in Detroit, 7 May 1976.	2:19
4.	"The Long and Winding Road"	McCartney–Lennon	Recorded in Kansas City, 29 May 1976.	4:13
5.	"Live and Let Die"		Recorded in Boston, 22 May 1976.	3:07

Side three
No.	Title	Writer(s)	Notes	Length
1.	"Picasso's Last Words (Drink to Me)"		Recorded in Boston, 22 May 1976.	1:55
2.	"Richard Cory"	Paul Simon	Recorded in Inglewood, 23 June 1976.	2:50
3.	"Bluebird"		Recorded in Cincinnati, 27 May 1976.	3:37
4.	"I've Just Seen a Face"	McCartney–Lennon	Recorded in Inglewood, 23 June 1976.	1:49
5.	"Blackbird"	McCartney–Lennon	Recorded in Boston, 22 May 1976.	2:23
6.	"Yesterday"	McCartney–Lennon	unknown	1:43

Side four
No.	Title	Writer(s)	Notes	Length
1.	"You Gave Me the Answer"		Recorded in Inglewood, 23 June 1976.	1:47
2.	"Magneto and Titanium Man"		Recorded in Boston, 22 May 1976.	3:11
3.	"Go Now"	Larry Banks, Milton Bennett	Recorded in Inglewood, 23 June 1976.	3:27
4.	"My Love"		Recorded in Uniondale, 21 May 1976.	4:07
5.	"Listen to What the Man Said"		Recorded in Kansas City, 29 May 1976.	3:18

Side five
No.	Title	Writer(s)	Notes	Length
1.	"Let 'Em In"		Recorded in Inglewood, 23 June 1976.	4:02
2.	"Time to Hide"	Denny Laine	Recorded in New York City, 25 May 1976.	4:46
3.	"Silly Love Songs"		Recorded in New York City, 25 May 1976.	5:46
4.	"Beware My Love"		Recorded in Denver, 7 June 1976.	4:49

Side six
No.	Title	Notes	Length
1.	"Letting Go"	Recorded in Kansas City, 29 May 1976.	4:25
2.	"Band on the Run"	Recorded in Denver, 7 June 1976.	5:03
3.	"Hi, Hi, Hi"	Recorded in Denver, 7 June 1976.	2:57
4.	"Soily"	Recorded in Denver, 7 June 1976.	5:10
Total length:			115:33

== Archive collection reissue ==
Wings over America was reissued in several packages:

- Standard edition 2-CD; the original 28-track album
- Remastered vinyl 3-LP version of the standard edition
- Deluxe edition box set 3-CD/1-DVD; the original 28-track album, disc of bonus tracks, DVD of the TV documentary Wings over the World, 112-page book, assorted memorabilia, 60-page photograph book, 80-page sketch book and download link to all of the material
- Remastered (Record Store Day 2013 exclusive) vinyl 12-inch single of "Maybe I'm Amazed"
- Rockshow on DVD and Blu-ray digitally restored from the 35mm negative with remixed 5.1 surround sound

Discs one & two (standard edition): Sides one to three are on disc one, while sides four to six are on disc two.

Disc three

Live at the Cow Palace (deluxe edition box set and Best Buy special edition)
No.	Title	Writer(s)	Length
1.	"Let Me Roll It"		4:19
2.	"Maybe I'm Amazed"	Paul McCartney	5:27
3.	"Lady Madonna"	McCartney–Lennon	3:22
4.	"Live and Let Die"		3:38
5.	"Picasso's Last Words (Drink to Me)"		2:14
6.	"Bluebird"		4:28
7.	"Blackbird"	McCartney–Lennon	2:38
8.	"Yesterday"	McCartney–Lennon	1:57

All tracks previously unreleased, recorded live at the Cow Palace, San Francisco, 13 and 14 June 1976.

Disc four

DVD (deluxe edition box set)
No.	Title	Length
1.	"Wings Over the World"	75:46
2.	"Photographer's Pass"	7:45

== Personnel ==
- Paul McCartney – lead and backing vocals, bass (sides 1, 5 & 6, and "Go Now"), acoustic guitar (side 3), piano (sides 2 & 4), keyboards
- Linda McCartney – piano, keyboards, backing vocals, percussion
- Denny Laine – electric guitar, acoustic guitar (side 3), bass (on the songs where McCartney plays piano), backing vocals, piano ("Go Now"), keyboards, percussion ("Spirits of Ancient Egypt"), harmonica ("Time to Hide"), lead vocals on "Spirits of Ancient Egypt", "Richard Cory", "Time to Hide", and "Go Now", harmony lead vocal on "Picasso's Last Words (Drink to Me)"
- Jimmy McCulloch – electric and acoustic guitars, bass, backing vocals, lead vocals on "Medicine Jar"
- Joe English – drums, percussion, backing vocals
- Tony Dorsey – trombone, percussion
- Howie Casey – saxophone, percussion
- Steve Howard – trumpet, flugelhorn, percussion
- Thaddeus Richard – saxophone, clarinet, Western concert flute, percussion

== Charts ==
=== Weekly charts ===
Chart (1976–77)	Peak position
Australian Kent Music Report	2
Austrian Albums Chart	12
Canadian RPM 100	1
Dutch MegaChart Albums	10
Japanese Oricon LP Chart	4
New Zealand Albums Chart	3
Norwegian VG-lista Albums	7
Swedish Albums Chart	33
UK Albums Chart	8
US Billboard Top LPs & Tape	1
West German Media Control Albums Chart	9
Chart (2013)	Peak position
Austrian Albums (Ö3 Austria)	54
Belgian Albums (Ultratop Flanders)	68
Belgian Albums (Ultratop Wallonia)	70
Dutch Albums (Album Top 100)	67
French Albums (SNEP)	78
German Albums (Offizielle Top 100)	28
Swedish Albums (Sverigetopplistan)	34
UK Albums (Official Charts)	36
US Billboard 200	22
US Top Catalog Albums (Billboard)	1
US Vinyl Albums (Billboard)	7
Chart (2019)	Peak position
German Albums (Offizielle Top 100)	75

=== Year-end charts ===
Chart (1977)	Position
Australian Kent Music Report	15
Canadian RPM Top Albums	16
Japanese Oricon Albums	51
US Billboard 200	35

== Certifications and sales ==
Region	Certification	Certified units/sales
Canada (Music Canada)	Platinum	100,000^{^}
United Kingdom (BPI)	Gold	100,000^{^}
United States (RIAA)	Platinum	1,000,000^{^}
^{^} Shipments figures based on certification alone.
