= You Gave Me the Answer =

Single by Wings

from the album Venus and Mars
- A-side: "Letting Go"
- Released: 4 October 1975 (US); 18 October 1975 (UK)
- Recorded: 24 January – 6 March 1975
- Studio: Sea-Saint Studios, New Orleans; Wally Heider Studios, Los Angeles
- Genre: Music hall
- Length: 2:15
- Label: Capitol
- Songwriters: Paul McCartney and Linda McCartney
- Producer: Paul McCartney

Wings singles chronology
"Listen to What the Man Said" (1975)	"You Gave Me the Answer" (1975)	"Venus and Mars/Rock Show" (1975)

Venus and Mars track listing
- 13 tracks Side one: 1. "Venus and Mars"; 2. "Rock Show"; 3. "Love in Song"; 4. "You Gave Me the Answer"; 5. "Magneto and Titanium Man"; 6. "Letting Go"; Side two: 7. "Venus and Mars (Reprise)"; 8. "Spirits of Ancient Egypt"; 9. "Medicine Jar"; 10. "Call Me Back Again"; 11. "Listen to What the Man Said"; 12. "Treat Her Gently/Lonely Old People"; 13. "Crossroads Theme"

"You Gave Me the Answer" is a song by Wings. It was written by Paul McCartney and Linda McCartney and appeared on the album Venus and Mars.

== Origin and recording ==
McCartney has occasionally paid tribute to his father, James, who led his own band in his youth, by writing "Music Hall numbers." Other such songs from McCartney's catalogue include "When I'm Sixty-Four" and "Honey Pie". To enhance the realism of this period pastiche, McCartney recorded his lead vocals through a filter that removed much of the lower-end frequencies to help emulate the sound of singing through a megaphone, the signature sound of Rudy Vallee.

In concert, McCartney often dedicated this song to Fred Astaire.

The song was featured on The 7" Singles Box in 2022.

== Personnel ==
According to the author Luca Perasi:

- Paul McCartney – vocals, bass, piano, whistle
- Jimmy McCulloch – electric guitar
- Joe English – drums, woodblocks
- Michael J. Pierce – clarinet
- Vito Platomone – clarinet
- Carlos Klejman – violin
- Russell Bobrowski – violin
- Ronald B. Benko – trumpet
- John K. Branch – viola
- Harold Ballam – bassoon
- Bernard S. Richterman – cello
