= Wings Over the World (disambiguation) =

Wings Over the World may refer to:

- Wings Over the World, a 1979 film
- Wings Over the World, post-apocalyptic civilization in H. G. Wells 1936 film Things to Come
