= Walking in the Park with Eloise =

Single by the Country Hams
- B-side: "Bridge on the River Suite"
- Released: 18 October 1974
- Recorded: 16 July 1974
- Studio: Soundshop Recording Studios, Nashville
- Genre: Jazz
- Length: 3:10
- Label: EMI
- Songwriter: Jim McCartney (credited as "James McCartney")
- Lyricist: Joseph McCartney (uncredited)
- Producer: Paul McCartney

The Country Hams singles chronology
"Band on the Run" (1974)	"Walking in the Park with Eloise" (1974)	"Junior's Farm" (1974)

"Walking in the Park with Eloise" is a jazz instrumental written by Jim McCartney, alongside his brother Joe (Joseph) who wrote the lyrics, in the early 1920s to the late 1930s. It was later recorded by his son Paul McCartney with his band Wings and released as a single under the name the Country Hams. The B-side, "Bridge on the River Suite", is another instrumental jazz composition, credited to Paul and Linda McCartney. It was released in the UK on 18 October 1974, and in the US on 2 December 1974.

The Dixieland jazz style of "Walking in the Park with Eloise" deviates from the pop and rock stylings of much of McCartney's recordings. The song (along with its B-side) was later included in the Archive Collection reissue of Wings' 1975 album Venus and Mars in 2014. Additionally, an orchestral version of the track, arranged by Carl Davis and performed by the Chamber Orchestra of London, was featured in the 2016 film Ethel & Ernest and included on its soundtrack. This version was also included in The 7" Singles Box in 2022.

== Personnel ==
- Paul McCartney – bass, washboard
- Denny Laine – acoustic guitar
- Geoff Britton – drums
- Chet Atkins – electric guitar
- Floyd Cramer – piano
- Bobby Thompson – banjo
- Denis Good – trombone
- Don Sheffield – trumpet
- Bill Puitt – clarinet
