= Junior's Farm =

Single by Paul McCartney and Wings
- B-side: "Sally G"
- Released: 25 October 1974 (UK)
- Recorded: 13 July 1974
- Studio: Sound Shop (Nashville, Tennessee)
- Genre: Glam rock
- Length: 4:20; 3:03 (DJ edit)
- Label: Apple
- Songwriters: Paul McCartney, Linda McCartney
- Producer: Paul McCartney

Wings singles chronology
"Walking in the Park with Eloise" (1974)	"Junior's Farm" (1974)	"Listen to What the Man Said" (1975)

Alternative covers
- Italian single cover

Official video
- "Junior's Farm" on YouTube

"Junior's Farm" is a song by the British–American rock band Paul McCartney and Wings. Written by Paul and Linda McCartney, it was issued as a non-album single by Apple Records on 25 October 1974 in the UK and 4 November in the US; it peaked at No. 3 in the United States and No. 16 in the United Kingdom.

== Writing ==
McCartney had his first ideas about writing a song about quiet farm lifestyle during his long family stay at his cottage in Campbeltown, Scotland, between April and August 1970, amidst the turbulent break-up of the Beatles, but he shelved his recording project for four years. McCartney in 1966 bought the 183-acre Scottish estate called High Park Farm, a place where he composed and recorded several songs. In his 2021 memoir book titled The Lyrics: 1956 to the Present, he said:

It was such a relief to get out of those business meetings with people in suits, who were so serious all the time, and go off to Scotland and be able just to sit around in a T-shirt and corduroys. I was very much in that mindset when I wrote this song. The basic message is, let’s get out of here. You might say it's my post-Beatles getting-out-of-town song.

McCartney explained that he based the song's lyrical theme on Bob Dylan's 1965 "Maggie's Farm" and that "the idea was to just get a fantasy song about this person Junior." McCartney said that, in contrast to the degree of thought Dylan applied to his songwriting, "Junior's Farm" "has silly words and basically all it means is, 'Let's get out of the city.' ... As for reading deep meanings into the words, people shouldn't bother, there aren't any."

== Recording ==
Wings recorded "Junior's Farm" on 13 July 1974 at the Sound Shop Studio in Nashville, Tennessee. Mixing occurred in October. Four different mixes were made by Ernie Winfrey in Nashville, Geoff Emerick in London, Alan O'Duffy at Olympic Studios and George Martin at AIR Studios. McCartney chose O'Duffy's for release.

The song was engineered by Ernie Winfrey at Soundshop Studios in Nashville, owned by Buddy Killen. While recording in Nashville, the band stayed at the Lebanon, Tennessee farm of Curly Putman Jr., which accounts for the song's title. Jimmy McCulloch played the guitar solo as his Wings debut. He is mentioned in a line in the song ("Take me down Jimmy").

Despite its relative success outside America, neither of these two songs were included on their subsequent studio album Venus and Mars of 1975, which was scheduled to start its recording sessions between 5 and 13 November 1974 in London.

"Junior's Farm" was performed live during the Wings Over the World tour in 1975, later appearing during McCartney's solo 2011 concerts. McCartney has excluded the verse mentioning a "president" during later live performances.

== Release ==
"Junior's Farm" / "Sally G" was released through Apple Records on 25 October 1974 in the UK and on 4 November in the US, a few days before the band started recording Venus and Mars in England. The single continued McCartney and Wings' worldwide success after the album Band on the Run. It made No. 3 in the US, No. 16 in the UK, and was a hit elsewhere. A shorter "DJ edit", with a length of 3:03, was cut for radio stations and excludes the verse that mentions a "president".

Cash Box called it "a very strong disk", saying that "it has that unique McCartney flair that makes all his musical forays such inspired hit records." Record World said that "Vassar Clements fiddle adds a subtle country touch to a straight-out 'Get Back'-type rocker."

The photo for one of the single's picture sleeves, taken by Clive Arrowsmith, featured Wings dressed in costumes corresponding to the song's lyrics (for example, drummer Geoff Britton as a poker dealer and guitarist Denny Laine as an Eskimo). A sea lion, also mentioned in the lyrics, appears in the photo, between Britton and McCartney, a farmer. This photo appeared on the single's picture sleeve in parts of Europe and South America and in advertisements elsewhere. Alternative advertisements depicted a comic strip of the band on the farm, and another a black-and-white photo of Wings on Curly Putman's front porch.

The music video of "Junior's Farm" shows Paul McCartney playing a Kay electric bass guitar. The single was McCartney's last release on Apple Records before signing a solo recording contract with Capitol Records in May 1975, following the dissolution of the Beatles' partnership.

== Subsequent releases ==
"Junior's Farm" was later released on the McCartney/Wings compilation Wings Greatest in 1978, the US version of All the Best! in 1987 and the deluxe editions of Pure McCartney in 2016 and Wings in 2025. The three-minute radio edit of the song was included on the 2001 compilation Wingspan: Hits and History. Along with its B-side (the country-flavoured "Sally G"), "Junior's Farm" was remastered for inclusion on the Hear-Music version of Venus and Mars released in November 2014.

It was also included on The 7" Singles Box in 2022.

== Personnel ==
According to the author Luca Perasi:

Musicians

- Paul McCartney – lead and backing vocals, bass guitar
- Linda McCartney – backing vocals, Moog synthesiser
- Denny Laine – backing vocals, electric guitar
- Jimmy McCulloch – electric guitar
- Geoff Britton – drums

Technical

- Paul McCartney – producer
- Ernie Winfrey – engineer

== Chart performance ==
=== Weekly charts ===
Chart (1974–1975)	Peak position
Australia (Kent Music Report)	11
Canadian RPM 100	10
Japan (Oricon)	77
New Zealand Listener Chart	3
Norwegian VG-lista Singles	9
South African Springbok Singles	6
UK Singles Chart	16
US Billboard Hot 100	3
US Cash Box Top 100	4

=== Year-end charts ===
Chart (1974)	Rank
Canada	115

Chart (1975)	Rank
Australia (Kent Music Report)	77
US Billboard Hot 100	88
US Cash Box Top 100	92

== Cover versions ==
- In 1994, "Junior's Farm" was covered by the Lee Harvey Oswald Band on their album A Taste of Prison.
- In 1996, "Junior's Farm" was covered by Galactic Cowboys on their EP Feel the Rage.
- In 2014, "Junior's Farm" was covered by Steve Miller for inclusion on the covers album The Art of McCartney.
