= Medicine Jar =

1975 song by Wings

Song by Wings

from the album Venus and Mars
- Released: 27 May 1975
- Recorded: 11–13 November 1974
- Studio: Abbey Road, London
- Length: 3:37
- Label: Capitol
- Songwriters: Jimmy McCulloch; Colin Allen
- Producer: Paul McCartney

"Medicine Jar" is a song written by Colin Allen and Jimmy McCulloch that first appeared on Wings's 1975 album Venus and Mars. It was included in the setlist for the Wings over the World tour in 1975 and 1976 and subsequently included on the 1976 live album Wings over America.

== Writing and recording ==
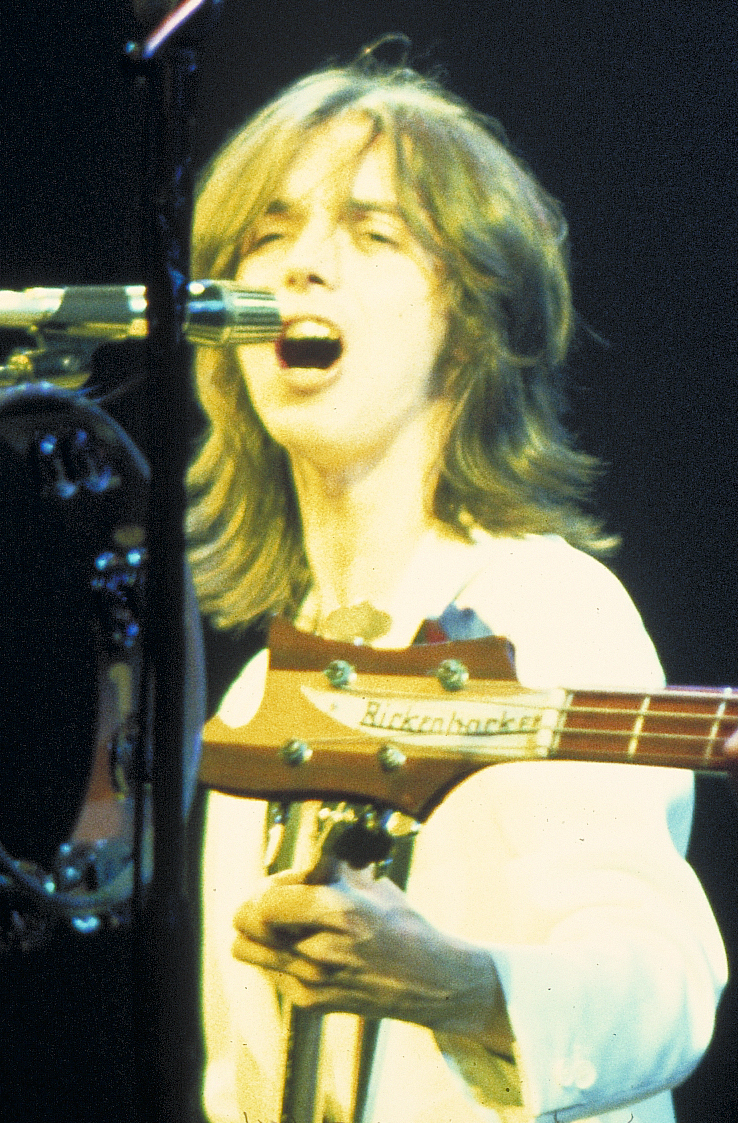
Jimmy McCulloch, who co-wrote and sung "Medicine Jar", performing with Wings in 1976

Allen wrote the words to "Medicine Jar" and McCulloch wrote the music. According to Allen "I had lots of lyrics lying around...I gave [McColluch] the completed lyrics and he created a song." They had written the song during their time together in the band Stone the Crows and it was originally titled "Itchy Fingers".

During rehearsals for the initial recording sessions for Venus and Mars, Paul McCartney heard McCulloch, who was then Wings' lead guitarist, playing the song on an organ. McCartney told McCulloch "I like the tune...Let's arrange it, let's do it."

Wings recorded "Medicine Jar" during sessions at EMI Studios in London from 11 to 13 November 1974. It was one of the first songs recorded for Venus and Mars. McCulloch sang lead vocals and played electric guitar, Denny Laine also played electric guitar, Paul McCartney played bass guitar, Linda McCartney played organ and Geoff Britton played drums. Overdubs were added in early February 1975, with McColluch adding an additional guitar part using a wah wah pedal while Joe English, who had replaced Britton as Wings' drummer, added cymbal crashes. On 2 March, additional overdubs were added, with Paul McCartney adding an electric guitar part of his own and all five Wings members adding backing vocals. Further backing vocals were overdubbed later in March.

== Lyrics and music ==
"Medicine Jar" is an anti-drug song, with lyrics such as "Dead on your feet, you won't get far if you keep on sticking your hand in the medicine jar". Paris News critic John Edmiston called it "a modern-day version of the Stones' 'Mother's Little Helper'". The main inspiration was Allen's girlfriend Jeanette Jacobs, who had been a singer with the Cake, when Allen had found quaaludes hidden in the fingers of Jacobs' gloves. Allen also stated that "I know how you feel now your friends are dead" was based on his experience of having friends die due to drug use. Ironically, McCulloch died of a drug overdose in 1979.

Beatles FAQ author Robert Rodriguez and Orlando Sentinel critic H. Nathan described "Medicine Jar" as a "rocker". Christian Science Monitor writer Mark Stevens called it "straight ahead rock." Fort Worth Star-Telegram critic Gerry Barker similarly called it "straight ahead rock and roll...that boasts a backbeat borrowed from Stevie Wonder." Daily Herald critic Tom Von Malder described it as "heavily New Orleans jazz-flavored." Music journaist Em Casalena described the song as "swaggy".

== Reception ==
Muzikalia critic Txus Igelsias rated "Medicine Jar" to be Wings' 12th best song. Em Casalena described it as "one of my personal favorite hits that were not performed by classic rock bands’ frontmen", since Paul McCartney was the lead singer for almost all Wings' songs, and said that it "is still one of McCullough’s most memorable tunes with the band." Nathan considered it to be better than any of McCartney's songs on Venus and Mars. Edmiston likewise called it his favorite song on the album. Mercury reviewer Steve Jack called it a "marvelous composition". Music journalist Anrew Wild commented on the "thrilling guitar playing and tight rhythm section." New York Daily News critic Josh Mills said that it "sounds a bit like Paul Revere and the Raiders spiced by a wah-wah guitar.

Hartford Courant critic Henry McNulty called it "enjoyable" but "little more than standard rock fare." Stereo Review critic Lester Bangs called it "perhaps the most ineffectual anti-drug sermon in rock history". Messenger-Press critic Steve Wosahla called it a "mediocre [effort] that should have been eliminated" from Venus and Mars. Daily Record critic Bill Donnellon found it to be "banal".

== Live version ==
When Wings were developing their setlist for their Wings Over the World tour, "Medicine Jar" was included from the start, as was "Spirits of Ancient Egypt", which had guitarist Denny Laine on lead vocals. According to Wings' guitarist Denny Laine,

That was mainly at Paul's instigation. He didn't want the spotlight to be on him all the time. He was kind of sick of that. In Wings, he became the lead singer and that's it. And that was a lot on his shoulders, you know? So he wanted to bring us in to balance it out a little more.

In early shows, "Medicine Jar" was played during the first half of the show, right before "Soily" and then an acoustic set. For later shows it was moved to the second half of the set, between "Letting Go" and "Junior's Farm". A performance from Cincinnati on 27 May 1976 was included on Wings Over America

Palm Beach Post critic Bud Newman considered "Medicine Jar" to be the best of the songs on Wings Over America that did not feature Paul McCartney singing the lead vocal. Washington Post critic Larry Rohter praised McCulloch's "blistering" guitar solo on the album, as well as his "Ringo-like lead vocal." Wosahla called the live version on Wings Over America a "tailor made arena style rocker." Journal News critic Ken Williams called it "a dazzling number with good sound."
