= The Art of McCartney =

Compilation album by various artists
- Released: 18 November 2014
- Studio: Various
- Genre: Rock
- Length: 125:17
- Label: Arctic Poppy via Kobalt
- Producer: Ralph Sall

The Art of McCartney is a tribute album to English musician Paul McCartney, released on 18 November 2014. The 42-song set covers McCartney's solo work, and his work with the Beatles and Wings, and features a wide range of artists such as Jeff Lynne, Barry Gibb, Brian Wilson, The Cure, B.B. King, Bob Dylan, Willie Nelson, Alice Cooper, Smokey Robinson, and Kiss. According to producer Ralph Sall, the project took 11 years to complete.

== Background ==
Sall originally came up with the project in 2003 when he worked with McCartney on reviving the song "A Love for You" from McCartney's sessions for the 1971 album Ram, for the In-Laws soundtrack. Sall got the approval from McCartney to begin work on the project and began recording songs with McCartney's backing band which includes guitarists Rusty Anderson and Brian Ray, keyboardist Paul "Wix" Wickens and drummer Abe Laboriel Jr. It was then that Sall started to seek out other artists to cover McCartney's work; the Beach Boys' founding member Brian Wilson was the first to come on board, with his cover of McCartney's "Wanderlust".

== Release ==
The Cure featuring James McCartney, Paul's son, performing their cover of "Hello, Goodbye", was released on 9 September 2014 through Rolling Stone.

The album is available in a variety of formats, ranging from 34-track CD, vinyl and digital releases to a 42-track deluxe set with hardbound books, a DVD documentary about the making of the album, and more. A thousand-copy limited edition deluxe box set was also released and includes signed artwork by Beatles associate Alan Aldridge, a USB drive designed to look like McCartney's signature Hofner bass, the DVD documentary, an audio documentary, an illustrated guide to the release, art cards, CDs, vinyl and a certificate of authenticity.

== Track listing ==
No.	Title	Performer(s)	Length
1.	"Maybe I'm Amazed"	Billy Joel	5:05
2.	"Things We Said Today"	Bob Dylan	3:01
3.	"Band on the Run"	Heart	5:14
4.	"Junior's Farm"	Steve Miller	4:17
5.	"The Long and Winding Road"	Yusuf Islam	3:30
6.	"My Love"	Harry Connick Jr.	4:05
7.	"Wanderlust"	Brian Wilson	4:16
8.	"Bluebird"	Corinne Bailey Rae	3:23
9.	"Yesterday"	Willie Nelson	3:00
10.	"Junk"	Jeff Lynne	2:12
11.	"When I'm Sixty-Four"	Barry Gibb	2:41
12.	"Every Night"	Jamie Cullum	2:59
13.	"Venus and Mars/Rock Show"	Kiss	6:40
14.	"Let Me Roll It"	Paul Rodgers	4:33
15.	"Helter Skelter"	Roger Daltrey	4:01
16.	"Helen Wheels"	Def Leppard	3:50
17.	"Hello, Goodbye"	The Cure featuring James McCartney	4:02
18.	"Live and Let Die"	Billy Joel	3:09
19.	"Let It Be"	Chrissie Hynde	3:48
20.	"Jet"	Robin Zander and Rick Nielsen	4:11
21.	"Hi, Hi, Hi"	Joe Elliott	3:10
22.	"Letting Go"	Heart	3:58
23.	"Hey Jude"	Steve Miller	5:13
24.	"Listen To What The Man Said"	Owl City	3:36
25.	"Got to Get You Into My Life"	Perry Farrell	2:42
26.	"Drive My Car"	Dion	2:51
27.	"Lady Madonna"	Allen Toussaint	2:16
28.	"Let 'Em In"	Dr. John	5:13
29.	"So Bad"	Smokey Robinson	3:21
30.	"No More Lonely Nights"	The Airborne Toxic Event	3:35
31.	"Eleanor Rigby"	Alice Cooper	2:09
32.	"Come And Get It"	Toots Hibbert with Sly & Robbie	2:21
33.	"On the Way"	B.B. King	3:20
34.	"Birthday"	Sammy Hagar	3:28

Bonus tracks
No.	Title	Performer(s)	Length
1.	"C Moon" (Amazon exclusive)	Robert Smith	4:40
2.	"Can't Buy Me Love" (iTunes exclusive)	Booker T. Jones
3.	"P.S. I Love You" (iTunes exclusive)	Ronnie Spector
4.	"All My Loving" (Target exclusive)	Darlene Love	2:13
5.	"For No One" (Best Buy exclusive)	Ian McCulloch
6.	"Put It There" (Amazon exclusive)	Peter, Bjorn and John	2:27
7.	"Run Devil Run" (Target exclusive)	Wanda Jackson
8.	"Smile Away" (Best Buy exclusive)	Alice Cooper
