= The Wild Angels (band) =

- Origin: United Kingdom
- Genre: Rock and roll
- Years active: 1967–present
- Members: Freddie "Babyface" Pirotta; Mitch Mitchell; Paul Black "Wild" Bob Burgos; Keith Read
- Past members: Mal Gray; Bob O'Connor; John Hawkins; John Huggett; Pete Adderson; Dave Jacobs; Freddie 'Fingers' Lee; Rod Cotter; Pete Scott; Billy Barnes; Oz Garvey; Keith Read; Rusty Lupton

The Wild Angels is an English rock and roll group. The group got their name from the 1966 Roger Corman film The Wild Angels starring Peter Fonda.

== Biography ==
The Wild Angels was formed in the summer of 1967 with Mal Gray on vocals, John Hawkins on guitar, John Huggett on keyboards, Mitch Mitchell on bass guitar, Bill Kingston on piano and Bob O’Connor on drums. John Huggett was soon replaced by Pete Adderson. The band signed with B&C records in 1969 after having one release ("Nervous Breakdown"/"Watch the Wheels Go Round") on Major Minor, also in 1969, and following a successful tour with Gene Vincent during 1969, bassist Mitch Mitchell left the band to be replaced by Rod Cotter. When Cotter left his spot was filled by Keith Read.

When Mal Gray left the group in 1971 the lead vocals were taken over by bass guitar player Keith Read. Keith sang vocals on the band's most successful single which hit no 1 in Sweden in 1973. The song was "I Fought the Law", an old Crickets track from 1959, later recorded by the Clash. Mal Gray later worked as a solo act and also worked with Sha Na Na and was special guest vocalist with Bill Haley & His Comets during their two 1979 European and UK tours. The group signed with Decca Records in 1972, releasing one album and several singles including "Love's Made A Fool of You" with Swedish singer, Jerry Williams. Jerry Williams died in 2017, as did Mal Gray.

One of their Decca singles from 1972 included three songs "Beauty School Dropout", "Born to Hand Jive", and "Greased Lightnin'" from the musical Grease, which had not yet been staged in the UK. The Wild Angels later also joined the cast of the UK version of the stage musical. In 1975, Pete Scott became their new lead singer and new bass player Billy Barnes and new drummer Jim Russell replaced Geoff Britton, who later played with Paul McCartney and Wings.

After departing The Wild Angels, Mal Gray went on to form Mal Gray's Wild Angels with Pete Wingfield and Tom McGuinness.

The ‘official' line up of The Wild Angels were revived in 2012 by Mitch Mitchell and “Wild” Bob Burgos, and still play in Europe to this day. The band released an album in 2013 called The Wild Angels Ride Again.

== Members ==
- Keith Read (guitar and vocals)
- Paul Black (guitar and vocals)
- Mitch Mitchell (bass guitar and vocals)
- Freddie "Babyface" Pirotta (piano)
- "Wild" Bob Burgos (drums and vocals)

== Former members ==
- Mal Gray (vocals)
- Bob O'Connor (drums)
- John Huggett (keyboards)
- Pete Adderson (keyboard and rhythm guitar)
- Dave Jacobs (rhythm guitar, piano)
- Freddie 'Fingers' Lee (piano)
- Rod Cotter (bass guitar)
- Pete Scott (lead vocals)
- Billy Barnes (bass guitar)
- Oz Garvey (drums)
- Geoff Britton (drums)
- Rob 'Rooster' Little (guitar, vocals)
- John Hawkins (Lead Guitar, Vocals)
- Charlie Hockin (drums)
- Richard Topp (bass)
- Brian Francis (bass)
- Bill Kingston (piano)
- Rusty Lupton (piano)

== Discography ==
=== Singles ===
- "Nervous Breakdown" / "Watch the Wheels Go Round" – (Ariola) (1968)
- "Buzz Buzz A-Diddle It" / "Please Don’t Touch" – (B&C) (1970)
- "Let the Four Winds Blow" / "Stuck on You" – (B&C) (1970)
- "Sally Ann" / "Wrong Number, Try Again" – (B&C) (1970)
- "Three Nights a Week" / "Time to Kill" – (B&C) (1971)
- "Greased Lightning" / "Born to Hand Jive" / "Beauty School Dropout" – (Decca) (1972)
- "Clap Your Hands and Stamp Your Feet" / "Wild Angels Rock 'n' Roll" – (Decca) (1972)
- "I Fought the Law" / "Midnight Rider" – (Decca) (1973)
- "Running Bear" / "Sussin'" – (Decca) (1973)

=== Albums ===
- Live at the Revolution – (B&C 101) (1970)
- Red Hot 'n' Rockin' – (B&C 102) (1970)
- Out at Last – (Decca 5134) (1972)
- Let’s Get Back to Rock 'n' Roll – (Pye/Golden Hour 614) (1975)
- Rockin' the Joint – (Rockin RL-5006) (1979)
- Live in London – (Cassette) (1987) (10 tracks)
- Rockin' on the Railroad – (Valentine 8060, 1988) (Raucous 166, 2005)
- Down the Road a Piece – (Edwardian LP-002) (1997)
- The Original Wild Angels – (Nightingale LP-001) (1997)
- The Singles Album – (Nightingale BYCCD-001) (1998)
- Live, Wild, Red Hot 'n' Rockin' – (Sanctuary 451) (2002)
- Wild Angels Ride Again - (Foot Tappin' Records) (2013)
- Snakebite + The Wild Angels - (Atenzia Records Sweden) (2016)
- Leather, Studs 'n' Stripes - (Crazy Times Records France) CD and 12" vinyl (2016)
- 50th Anniversary EP - (TCY Records Switzerland) Gold vinyl only. (2017)
