= Venus and Mars (Wings album) =

Studio album by Wings
- Released: 27 May 1975
- Recorded: 5–13 November 1974; 20 January – 20 February 1975
- Studios: EMI, London; Sea-Saint, New Orleans; Wally Heider, Hollywood
- Genre: Rock
- Length: 43:10
- Label: Capitol
- Producer: Paul McCartney

Wings chronology
Band on the Run (1973)	Venus and Mars (1975)	Wings at the Speed of Sound (1976)

Singles from Venus and Mars
- 1. "Listen to What the Man Said" Released: 16 May 1975; 2. "Letting Go" Released: 19 September 1975 (US) (Note: 3 October 1975 (UK)); 3. "Venus and Mars/Rock Show" Released: 25 October 1975 (UK)

Venus and Mars is the fourth studio album by the British–American rock band Wings. Released on 27 May 1975 as the follow-up to Band on the Run, Venus and Mars continued Wings' run of commercial success and provided a springboard for a year-long worldwide tour. The album was Paul McCartney's first post-Beatles album to be released worldwide by Capitol Records rather than Apple.

After recording Band on the Run as a three-piece with wife Linda McCartney and guitarist Denny Laine, McCartney recruited guitarist Jimmy McCulloch and drummer Geoff Britton to the band in 1974. Recording sessions for the album took place in London, New Orleans and Los Angeles in November 1974 and early 1975. During the sessions, personal tensions caused Britton to leave after nine months, forcing the band to recruit American drummer Joe English to finish the album.

Preceded by the single "Listen to What the Man Said", Venus and Mars peaked at number 1 in the US, the UK and other countries around the world. It also received mostly favourable reviews from music critics but was ultimately considered inferior to its predecessor. The album was reissued with bonus tracks in 1987 on CD and in 1993 as part of The Paul McCartney Collection. It was remastered in 2014 and released as a deluxe edition with bonus tracks and unreleased material.

== Background and recording ==
After recording Band on the Run (1973) as a three-piece with wife Linda and guitarist Denny Laine, McCartney added Jimmy McCulloch on lead guitar and Geoff Britton on drums to the Wings line-up in 1974. Having written several new songs for the next album, McCartney decided to record the album in New Orleans, and Wings headed there in January 1975.

Before leaving for New Orleans, the group recorded three songs at EMI Studios in London in November 1974: "Letting Go", "Love In Song" and "Medicine Jar", all overdubbed later at Sea-Saint Studios in New Orleans alongside the recording of new material. Sea-Saint co-owner Allen Toussaint would play piano on the track "Rock Show". As engineer Alan O'Duffy disclosed to author Luca Perasi, some handbells were overdubbed onto "Love In Song" at Sea Saint. The engineer himself contributed some uncredited percussion and backing vocals on some tracks.

As soon as the sessions began, the personality clash evident between McCulloch and Britton during Wings' 1974 sessions in Nashville became more pronounced, and Britton – after a nine-month tenure – quit Wings, having played on only three of the new songs. A replacement, American Joe English, was quickly auditioned and hired to finish the album.

The sessions proved to be productive, not only resulting in a finished album, but also several additional songs, including two future McCartney B-sides, "Lunch Box/Odd Sox" and "My Carnival". McCartney also decided to link the album's songs together much like the Beatles had on Abbey Road to give Venus and Mars a more continuous feel.

John Lennon, often in a nostalgic mood during his "lost weekend" period, had told his then-girlfriend May Pang that they would visit the McCartneys during the recording sessions for Venus and Mars, and considered writing with Paul again. Lennon's planned visit never happened, however, due to his subsequent reunion with Yoko Ono.

The album ends with an interpretation of the theme of Crossroads, a British soap opera. McCartney chose to end the album with the song because "it's a bit of a British joke, ... it sounds like a closing theme." Author John Blaney noted that the tune held little significance outside of Britain.

== Artwork and packaging ==
The album cover was designed by Aubrey Powell. Paul summed it up as "a package that would be nice to get, and also something recognisable". Photographed by Linda, the cover depicts two snooker balls against a black background, which are yellow and red to fit the colours of the planets Venus and Mars. Interior photographs of Wings were shot in the Mojave Desert to capture a group photograph in an outerworldly location. Hipgnosis did the art design, incorporating snooker balls and cues in the lettering and illustrations by George Hardie; in return, McCartney later loaned a 16-track tape recorder to Hipgnosis member Peter Christopherson's band Throbbing Gristle to record their 1979 album 20 Jazz Funk Greats. After failing to credit the contributions of several personnel in the packaging of Band on the Run, the album credits for Venus and Mars credit almost every musician involved in the album's production, aside from the string, brass and wind ensemble players.

== Release and promotion ==
McCartney underwent several promotional efforts for Venus and Mars. On 24 March 1975, Paul and Linda held an expensive launch party for Venus and Mars aboard the British ocean liner RMS Queen Mary in Long Beach, California. The party honored the band's time recording in New Orleans with native food and musicians, including Professor Longhair, the Meters and Lee Dorsey. The party's decorations were inspired by the Venus and Mars packaging, featuring items such as yellow awnings and red carpeting. The over 200 guest list included musicians Bob and Sara Dylan, George Harrison, Mick Jagger, Marvin Gaye, Joni Mitchell, Harry Nilsson, Klaus Voormann, and members of the Jackson 5, Faces and Led Zeppelin. In early May, McCartney hired filmmaker Karel Reisz to film a commercial of the five band members hanging around a billiard table, which aired on ITV on 25 June. A few days after filming, the McCartneys conducted an interview with Paul Gambaccini, which was published in several magazines.

In mid-May, McCartney announced a "multi-million dollar", four-year deal with EMI and Capitol Records. Preceded by the US number-one single "Listen to What the Man Said", Venus and Mars was released two weeks later, on 27 May 1975 in the US, and on 30 May in the UK. The album reached number one in the United States, the United Kingdom and other countries around the world and sold four million copies worldwide.

Two additional singles, "Letting Go" and "Venus and Mars/Rock Show", were released. Although the latter almost reached the US top ten, it did not chart at all in the UK.

In September, Wings began what would be their year-long Wings Over the World tour in the UK, with concerts in Australia, Europe, the US and Canada to follow. Songs from Venus and Mars featured heavily in the concert setlist.

== Critical reception ==
Professional ratings
Review scores
Source	Rating
AllMusic	3/5 stars
Christgau's Record Guide	B+
Classic Rock	8/10
The Essential Rock Discography	6/10
Mojo	4/5 stars
MusicHound	2/5
Q	2/5 stars
Record Collector	3/5 stars
The Rolling Stone Album Guide	3.5/5 stars

Venus and Mars received mixed-to-generally favourable reviews from music critics. Critics compared the album both positively and negatively to Band on the Run. Robert Hilburn praised Venus and Mars as "the most appealing" ex-Beatle album since John Lennon's Imagine and the "first genuine Beatle sounding" 1970s album. He predicted the album would bring McCartney "back on top of the pop music hill". Crawdaddy magazine's Bruce Malamut wrote: "With the rare sacrifice to sappery, Venus treads the same turf as Band, further backwards/forwards in the direction of hard-nosed and intelligently finessed rockerama." In a positive review for Melody Maker, Chris Welch wrote that Venus and Mars will eventually "sink into the collective rock consciousness and become widely appreciated as another triumph for Wings and [McCartney]." Critics who praised the record included Record Mirror's Ray Fox-Cumming and Disc's Rosemary Horide, with the former considering it Wings' "opus".

Other critics were more negative, with several criticising the songs as lacking depth and purpose. In Sounds, Mike Flood praised the production and performances, but ultimately disliked the new songs: "McCartney's in a class of his own given the right material, but something is lacking here. I suspect heart." Writing for the San Francisco Chronicle, Joel Selvin praised McCartney's vocal performances and production, but believed the album was missing "new ideas, directions or orientations that would have kept McCartney from simply reshuffling successful formulas from his past". Rolling Stone's Paul Nelson criticised the songs as "insubstantial" and lacking depth and sincerity, declaring the album to be a manifestation of "Paul and Linda's chic, unconvincing and blatant bid to be enshrined as pop music's Romeo and Juliet." Charles Shaar Murray, in NME, believed Venus and Mars was so "terrible" that he "wouldn't use it to line a budgie cage". Hilburn and Selvin negatively compared Venus and Mars to Elton John's contemporary Captain Fantastic and the Brown Dirt Cowboy.

== Reissues ==
The album was first issued on compact disc by Columbia Records on 29 February 1984. A CD reissue by EMI in Britain appeared in October 1987, while another reissue by Capitol followed in November 1988. In 1993, Venus and Mars was remastered and reissued on CD as part of "The Paul McCartney Collection" series with "Zoo Gang" (a UK television theme that was the UK B-side of "Band on the Run" in 1974), "Lunch Box/Odd Sox" (B-side of "Coming Up" in 1980) and "My Carnival" ("Spies Like Us"' B-side in 1985) as bonus tracks. In 2007, the album was reissued in digital form on iTunes with the same bonus tracks, plus the extended "party mix" of "My Carnival"; however, this version has since been replaced by the 2014 reissue.

In 2014, the album was reissued by Hear Music/Concord Music Group as part of the fifth set of releases, alongside Wings at the Speed of Sound, in the Paul McCartney Archive Collection. It was released in multiple formats. The reissue was accompanied by the Record Store Day exclusive edition of the "Letting Go" single.

The album was also originally released in 4-channel quadraphonic sound. In 1996 the quadraphonic version of the album was issued on compact disc in the DTS 5.1 Music Disc format.

A half-speed mastered vinyl version of the album, done by Miles Showell at Abbey Road Studios using the original master tapes, was released on 21 March 2025 to celebrate its 50th anniversary.

== Track listing ==
All songs written by Paul and Linda McCartney (listed as "McCartney"), except "Medicine Jar" written by Jimmy McCulloch and Colin Allen, and "Crossroads Theme" written by Tony Hatch.

Side one

1. "Venus and Mars" – 1:16
2. "Rock Show" – 5:35
3. "Love in Song" – 3:04
4. "You Gave Me the Answer" – 2:15
5. "Magneto and Titanium Man" – 3:16
6. "Letting Go" – 4:33

Side two

1. "Venus and Mars (Reprise)" – 2:05
2. "Spirits of Ancient Egypt" – 3:04
3. "Medicine Jar" – 3:37
4. "Call Me Back Again" – 4:57
5. "Listen to What the Man Said" – 3:57
6. "Treat Her Gently/Lonely Old People" – 4:21
7. "Crossroads" – 1:00

Additional tracks on the 1987 CD reissue

14. "Zoo Gang" – 2:01
15. "Lunch Box/Odd Sox" – 3:55
16. "My Carnival" – 3:59

== Archive Collection reissue ==
- Standard edition 2-CD; the original 13-track album on the first disc, plus 14 bonus tracks on a second disc.
- Deluxe edition 2-CD/1-DVD;
  - the original 13-track #1 album remastered at Abbey Road Studios in London;
  - a bonus audio disc with 14 tracks including the hit single "Junior's Farm" and rare and previously unreleased songs;
  - a 128-page numbered hardbound book featuring new interview with Paul McCartney, rare and previously unpublished photographs by Linda McCartney and Aubrey Powell (entitled "Nashville Diary 1975"), inserts of archive material (including a facsimile of Paul's original handwritten lyric "scroll"), expanded track-by-track annotation and full history of the album, a deck pass "Paul and Linda McCartney – Venus and Mars", a complete illustrated history of the making of Venus and Mars and a poster and a flyer "Wings in concert at Elstree";
  - a DVD featuring previously unreleased and exclusive content including the original TV commercial for the album (directed by Karel Reisz), footage of the band in New Orleans ("Recording My Carnival" and "Bon Voyageur") and rehearsing the songs from Venus and Mars at Elstree Studios ("Wings at Elstree");
  - an access to downloadable 24bit 96 kHz high-resolution audio versions of the remastered album and bonus audio tracks.
- Remastered vinyl The albums will also be available on special gatefold vinyl editions (vinyl editions include a download card).
- High resolution Digital album was made available as both standard and deluxe versions – including mastered for iTunes and Hi-Res formats.

Disc 1 The original 13-track album.

Disc 2 – bonus tracks

All songs written by Paul and Linda McCartney except "Walking in the Park with Eloise" written by Jim McCartney and "Baby Face" written by Harry Akst and Benny Davis.

1. "Junior's Farm" (non-album single) – 4:23
2. "Sally G" (B-side to "Junior's Farm") – 3:40
3. "Walking in the Park with Eloise" (non-album single) – 3:10
4. "Bridge on the River Suite" (B-side to "Walking in the Park with Eloise") – 3:11
5. "My Carnival" (B-side to "Spies Like Us") – 3:59
6. "Going to New Orleans (My Carnival)" – 2:07
7. "Hey Diddle" (Ernie Winfrey mix) – 3:51
8. "Let's Love" – 2:05
9. "Soily" (from One Hand Clapping) – 3:57
10. "Baby Face" (from One Hand Clapping) – 1:43
11. "Lunch Box/Odd Sox" (B-side to "Coming Up") – 3:55
12. "4th of July" – 3:49
13. "Rock Show" (old version) – 7:09
14. "Letting Go" (single mix) – 3:36

Note: "Walking in the Park with Eloise" and "Bridge on the River Suite" are credited to the Country Hams.

Disc 3 – DVD

1. "Recording My Carnival"
2. "Bon Voyageur"
3. "Wings at Elstree"
4. "Venus and Mars TV Ad"

Additional download tracks available via paulmccartney.com

1. "Letting Go" (extended version) – 5:39
2. "Love My Baby" (from One Hand Clapping) – 1:16
3. "Rock Show" (new version) – 6:31

== Personnel ==
=== Wings ===
- Paul McCartney – lead vocals, bass, guitars, keyboards, piano, percussion
- Linda McCartney – keyboards, backing vocals, percussion
- Denny Laine – lead vocal on "Spirits of Ancient Egypt", vocals, guitars, keyboards, percussion
- Jimmy McCulloch – guitars, lead vocal on "Medicine Jar", vocals, percussion
- Joe English – drums, percussion
- Geoff Britton – drums on "Love in Song", "Letting Go" and "Medicine Jar"

=== Additional musicians ===
- Kenneth "Afro" Williams – congas on "Rock Show"
- Allen Toussaint – piano on "Rock Show"
- Dave Mason – guitar on "Listen to What the Man Said"
- Tom Scott – soprano saxophone on "Listen to What the Man Said"
- Clyde Kerr – trumpet
- John Longo – trumpet
- Steve Howard – trumpet
- Michael Pierce – alto sax
- Alvin Thomas – alto sax
- Carl Blouin – baritone sax

== Charts ==
=== Weekly charts ===
Original album
Chart (1975–76)	Peak position
Australian Kent Music Report	2
Canadian RPM Albums Chart	1
Dutch Mega Albums Chart	5
Japanese Oricon LP Chart	9
New Zealand Albums Chart	1
Norwegian VG-lista Albums Chart	1
Spanish Albums Chart	1
Swedish Albums Chart	2
UK Albums Chart	1
US Billboard Top LPs & Tape	1
West German Media Control Albums Chart	11

Reissue
Chart (2014)	Position
UK Albums Chart	49
US Billboard 200	31

=== Year-end charts ===
Chart (1975)	Position
Australian Albums Chart	8
Canadian Albums Chart	5
Dutch Albums Chart	27
French Albums Chart	66
Japanese Albums Chart	33
UK Albums Chart	5
US Billboard Year-End	57
Chart (1976)	Position
US Billboard Year-End	45

== Certifications and sales ==
Region	Certification	Certified units/sales
Canada (Music Canada)	Platinum	100,000^{^}
Japan (Oricon Charts)	—	152,000
United Kingdom (BPI)	Platinum	300,000^{^}
United States (RIAA)	Platinum	1,000,000^{^}
^{^} Shipments figures based on certification alone.
