= Soily =

1977 single by Wings

"Soily (Live Version)"

Single by Wings

from the album Wings over America
- A-side: "Maybe I'm Amazed"
- Released: 4 February 1977
- Recorded: 7 June 1976
- Venue: McNichols Arena, Denver
- Genre: Rock
- Length: 5:42
- Label: Capitol
- Songwriters: Paul McCartney; Linda McCartney
- Producer: Paul McCartney

Wings singles chronology
| "Let 'Em In" (1976) | "Maybe I'm Amazed" / "Soily" (1977) | "Seaside Woman" (1977) |

"Soily" is a song written by Paul McCartney in 1971. It was included in the setlist of his band Wings during their 1972 tour of Europe and their 1973 tour of Britain. In 1973 it was the first song of the set. It was then reworked and a faster, heavier version was played during the Wings Over the World tour, 1975–76. In the British leg of this tour, it ended the rock part of the set, after which Wings played a number of acoustic songs before returning to electric music. From the Australian leg (November 1975) up to the end of the tour (October 1976), "Soily" served as an encore although it was not played during every concert.

== Recording ==
At least seven takes of "Soily" were recorded in 1974 at Abbey Road Studios for inclusion in the Wings film One Hand Clapping, which went unreleased at the time. The album, including "Soily", finally received an official release in June 2024.

== Later release ==
"Soily" appears on the 1976 live album Wings over America and was released as the B-side of the single "Maybe I'm Amazed" in 1977. This version was recorded on 7 June 1976 at McNichols Sports Arena in Denver. A performance from One Hand Clapping can be seen on a DVD included with the 2010 remastered special edition of the Wings album Band on the Run, and on the bonus disc of Venus and Mars (Collector's Edition). This performance also appears on the expanded edition of the 2025 compilation Wings.

A live recording from Berlin 1972 is included in the CD box set Wings 1971–73, released in 2018. The 1977 single release was also included on The 7" Singles Box in 2022.

== Personnel ==
The musicians who played on the 1977 live recording are as follows:

- Paul McCartney – lead vocals, bass
- Linda McCartney – backing vocals, keyboards
- Denny Laine – backing vocals, electric guitar, gob iron
- Jimmy McCulloch – electric guitar
- Joe English – drums
- Howie Casey – saxophone
- Thaddeus Richard – saxophone
- Steve Howard – flugelhorn
- Tony Dorsey – trombone
