= One in a Million (band) =

Scottish band

- Origin: Glasgow, Scotland
- Genres: Psychedelic rock
- Years active: 1967
- Labels: CBS, MGM
- Past members: Alan Young; Jack McCulloch; Jimmy McCulloch; William Scenters

One in a Million were a 1960s psychedelic rock band from Glasgow, Scotland, that included Jimmy McCulloch, later a member of Paul McCartney's Wings, as their lead guitarist.

They released two singles in 1967, "Use Your Imagination" / "Hold On" for CBS, and "Double Sight" / "Fredereek Hernando" for MGM. This has become one of the most collectable psychedelic singles, and was included in David Wells' Top 100 Psychedelic Records by Record Collector magazine. A compilation album was released in 2008, which included both their singles and previously unreleased acetate tracks. Their song "No Smokes" was used in an episode of the TV series Clangers.

== Discography ==
=== Singles ===
- "Use Your Imagination" / "Hold On" (CBS 202513) 1967
- "Fredereek Hernando" / "Double Sight" (MGM 1370) 1967

=== Compilation albums ===
- Double Sight (Wooden Hill WHCD018) 2008
