= Letting Go (Wings song) =

Single by Wings

from the album Venus and Mars
- B-side: "You Gave Me the Answer"
- Released: 19 September 1975 (US)
- Recorded: 5 November 1974 (basic track); 6 February 1975 (overdubs)
- Studio: Abbey Road, London; Sea-Saint, New Orleans
- Genre: Blues rock
- Length: 4:30 (album); 3:36 (single)
- Label: Capitol
- Songwriters: Paul McCartney; Linda McCartney
- Producer: Paul McCartney

Wings singles chronology
"Listen to What the Man Said" (1975)	"Letting Go" (1975)	"Venus and Mars/Rock Show" (1975)

Official audio
- "Letting Go" on YouTube

Alternative cover
- German single cover

"Letting Go" is a song credited to Paul and Linda McCartney and originally released by Wings on their 1975 album Venus and Mars. The song was remixed and released as a single on 19 September 1975 in the United States and 3 October in the United Kingdom. The song peaked at number 41 in the UK, 41 on the Cash Box Top 100 and number 39 on the Billboard Hot 100.

== Recording ==
The song was recorded late in 1974 at Abbey Road Studios, before the band went to New Orleans to record the majority of Venus and Mars. It was one of only three songs recorded for the album with short-term Wings drummer Geoff Britton before he quit the band (the others being "Love in Song" and "Medicine Jar").

== Lyrics and music ==
Like many of Paul McCartney's songs of this period, the subject of "Letting Go" is his wife Linda. The singer describes himself in a relationship with a beautiful woman but he remains concerned about the relationship. McCartney biographer Peter Ames Carlin claims that the song "traced the thin line between love and obsession", with "passion in all its unhinged, dangerous glory." The song reflects McCartney's recognition that he needed to give his wife more space to pursue her own interests, after Linda had given up her career as a photographer to join his band. The content of the lyrics varies between the verses and refrain, with the verses describing the subject and the refrain acknowledging the idea of "letting go." The key is A minor at the start of the song, but the song ends in C minor.

The contrast in the lyrics is also reflected in the music, with the refrain using a descending note melody and having a darker sound than the verses, which have a melody that wavers up and down. The song uses a medium tempo, and the instruments include a guitar part described by Allmusic critic Donald Guarisco as "bluesy" and keyboards, plus a horn parts in an interlude as well as in the outro. "Letting Go" has more of a soul music feel than most of the songs on Venus and Mars, which are more pop music oriented. McCartney described it as a "funky little riff."

== Critical reception ==
Billboard described it as being one of Wings' "less surrealistic productions," commenting on its "hymn-to-nature" lyrics and "vaguely omninous minor chord progression." Cash Box commented on the "Eagles-influenced guitars." The single version is remixed and is approximately a minute shorter than the album track. The single also incorporates elements that were not included on the album track, such as an organ glissando at the beginning.

Ultimate Classic Rock contributor Nick DeRiso rated "Letting Go" to be Wings' 10th greatest song, praising its "dark, roiling tone" and how it "explores that narrow space between love and obsession to great effect." Muzikalia critic Txus Iglesias rated it to be Wings' 4th best song, praising its power and rawness. Chip Madinger and Mark Easter called it "one of the best songs on the LP." Robert Rodriguez called it "a strong track topped with a full slab of brass" and noted that it was "one of the Wings' onstage highlights." Authors Roy Carr and Tony Tyler described the song as one of the few "genuinely potent" tracks on Venus and Mars but said that McCartney "should have taken his advice and let go. This seeks to be composedly heavy but merely succeeds in attaining a considerable degree of ponderosity." In the book The Rough Guide to the Beatles, Chris Ingham wrote "Letting Go" was "an inert sludge rocker," calling it "a disastrous choice for a single."

== Other releases ==
The single edit of "Letting Go" was featured on The 7" Singles Box in 2022. The full album track was released on the deluxe edition of Wings in 2025.

== Live performances ==
The song was performed during the Wings over America tour in 1976, and was included on the live album Wings over America and on the concert film, Rockshow. Larry Rohter of The Washington Post described the performance on Wings Over America as "rollicking" and "exciting." Ben Fong-Torres described McCartney's live performance of the song as "reaching back for some of that Little Richard inspiration." Ultimate Classic Rock critic Nick DeRiso said that it "is shot through with this jagged sexuality." McCartney played it again during his 2010 Up and Coming Tour, his 2016 One on One tour, and his 2023 Got Back tour.

A previously unreleased mix of the song was offered as a free download through Lauren Laverne's Radio 6 Music show on 29 October 2014.

== Covers ==
"Letting Go" has been covered by Ian Mitchell on the album Garage Band Tribute To the Beatles.

In 2014 the song was covered by Heart on The Art of McCartney covers album. Allmusic critic Stephen Thomas Erlewine describes this version as laying into the song's "spooky heart."

== Personnel ==
According to the author Luca Perasi:

Wings

- Paul McCartney – lead and backing vocals, electric guitar, bass, electric piano
- Linda McCartney – backing vocals, organ
- Denny Laine – backing vocals
- Jimmy McCulloch – electric guitar
- Geoff Britton – drums

Additional musicians

- Clyde Kerr – trumpet
- John Longo – trumpet
- Michael Pierce – alto saxophone
- Alvin Thomas – tenor saxophone
- Carl Blouin – baritone saxophone

== Charts ==
Chart (1975)	Peak position
Canada Top Singles (RPM)	90
Japan (Oricon)	64
UK Singles (Official Charts)	41
US Billboard Hot 100	39
