= Magneto and Titanium Man =

Single by Wings

from the album Venus and Mars
- A-side: "Venus and Mars/Rock Show"
- Released: 1 November 1975
- Recorded: 27 January, 14 and 17 February 1975
- Studio: Sea-Saint Studios
- Genre: Glam rock; rock and roll
- Length: 3:16
- Label: Capitol
- Songwriter: Paul McCartney
- Producer: Paul McCartney

Wings singles chronology
"Letting Go" (1975)	"Magneto and Titanium Man" (1975)	"Silly Love Songs" (1976)

"Magneto and Titanium Man" is a 1975 song by Wings which appears on their fourth album Venus and Mars. The song was also released as the B-side of the "Venus and Mars/Rock Show" single. The song later featured on The 7" Singles Box in 2022.

== Lyrics ==
The song is in narrative form, and includes the Marvel Comics characters Magneto, Titanium Man and the Crimson Dynamo in its story. When asked his opinion of the song decades after its release, Stan Lee (who co-created all three characters) said he thought it was "terrific." McCartney said after reading a comic book that inspired the song "It took some skill – not to mention perspective and imagination – to pull off these illustrations. So, I decided it would be nice to bring these two comic book characters into a song."

== Personnel ==
According to the author Luca Perasi:

- Paul McCartney – lead and backing vocals, bass, electric guitar, electric piano
- Linda McCartney – clavinet, backing vocals
- Denny Laine – electric guitar, backing vocals
- Jimmy McCulloch – electric guitar
- Joe English – drums

== Live ==
The song was included in the setlist for the band's 1975/1976 world tours. While it was performed, comic art of Magneto, created by Stan Lee and Jack Kirby, and Titanium Man & the Crimson Dynamo, created by Stan Lee and Don Heck, was projected onto the large screen behind the band. The Magneto figure on the backdrop is by George Tuska and John Tartaglione from X-Men #43 (April 1968, on sale February 1968), the Titanium Man is by George Tuska and Mike Esposito from Iron Man #22 (February 1970, on sale December 1969), and the Crimson Dynamo is by Sal Buscema and Joe Staton from Avengers #130 (December 1974, on sale October 1974). The two backdrop figures are reversed from their original comic book presentation.

McCartney, a Marvel Comics fan and comic book fan in general, met with Kirby on the L.A. leg of the tour, giving him front row seats and back stage passes (his daughter was a big Wings and Beatles fan), and Kirby backstage gave Paul and Linda an original comic drawing he did of them.

== Reception ==
Ultimate Classic Rock critic Nick DeRiso ranked it as McCartney's 18th best "deep cut" and 35th best song from the 1970s, calling it "impish and ear-wormy".

The song can be heard coming from a radio, creating an argument, in a scene in the 1976 Mike Leigh play Nuts in May.

The Roots played the song as walk-on music for Michael Fassbender for his appearance on The Tonight Show with Jimmy Fallon during his promotional tour for X-Men: Days of Future Past.
