= Sea-Saint Studios =

Recording studio in New Orleans, Louisiana

Sea-Saint Studios was a music recording facility located at 3809 Clematis Street in New Orleans, Louisiana, which was co-owned by musician, producer, and arranger, Allen Toussaint and record A&R man and publishing agent Marshall Sehorn, which was in operation for over thirty years, from 1973-2005, when it was destroyed during Hurricane Katrina. During those years it hosted recordings by numerous musical acts such as Paul McCartney, Paul Simon, Patti LaBelle, Joe Cocker, and Elvis Costello, as well as local acts such as the Meters and Dr. John.

Toussaint and Sehorn opened the studio in the Gentilly section of New Orleans in 1973. The two had teamed up in 1965 to form Sansu Records (and its sister labels Tou-Sea and Deesu), as well as Mar-Saint Publishing. The Sansu organization boasted hit recordings by acts such as Lee Dorsey, who scored big with "Workin' in a Coal Mine" and "Ride Your Pony" and Betty Harris, who reached Billboard's Top 20 with "Nearer to You." Many of the Sansu recordings were backed by the label's oft used house band, Art Neville & The Sounds, who eventually become known as the Meters. Many of the Sansu recordings done during these years were done at Cosimo Matassa's studios, the recording venue of choice with many New Orleans musicians. In 1973 Toussaint and Sehorn opened Sea-Saint Studios, which was at the time a state of the art facility.

Sea-Saint Studios became a favored recording destination for numerous top musical acts. Paul McCartney and Wings recorded the majority of tracks on their 1975 Venus and Mars album at Sea-Saint, featuring one of their most popular songs, "Listen to What the Man Said." There Patti LaBelle cut her smash hit, "Lady Marmalade," which went to #1 on Billboard's Hot 100 Paul Simon, Joe Cocker, and Elvis Costello also recorded there. The studio also served as a recording venue for top New Orleans acts such as The Meters and Dr. John. Dr. John recorded his Desitively Bonaroo album there which yielded the 1974 hit "(EverybodyWanna Get Rich) Rite Away," backed by the Meters and produced by Allen Toussaint. The Meters' own 1974 LP, Rejuvenation, was recorded at Sea Saint and produced by Toussaint. Catholic singers The Dameans recorded several of their recordings at Sea-Saint Studios, including "Remember Your Love" (1978) and "Path of Life" (1981).

On August 29, 2005, Hurricane Katrina destroyed the studio, leaving it flooded under 3.5 feet of water.
