= Wings Over the World tour =

1975–76 concert tour by Wings

- Transcontinental tour by Wings
- Poster to the concert in Munich, West Germany
- Location: Europe • North America • Oceania
- Associated albums: Band on the Run; Venus and Mars; Wings at the Speed of Sound
- Start date: 9 September 1975
- End date: 21 October 1976
- Legs: 6
- No. of shows: 65

Wings concert chronology
- Wings 1973 UK Tour (1973); Wings Over the World Tour (1975–76); Wings UK Tour 1979 (1979)

The Wings Over the World tour was a series of concerts in 1975 and 1976 by the British–American rock band Wings performed in Britain, Australia, Europe, the United States and Canada. The North American leg constituted band leader Paul McCartney's first live performances there since the Beatles' final tour, in 1966, and the only time Wings would perform live in the US and Canada. The world tour was well-attended and critically acclaimed, and resulted in a triple live album, Wings over America, which Capitol Records released in December 1976. In addition, the tour was documented in the television film Wings Over the World (1979) and a cinema release, Rockshow (1980).

The set list for much of the tour featured material from Wings' bestselling studio albums Band on the Run (1973), Venus and Mars (1975) and Wings at the Speed of Sound (1976), as well as some of McCartney's compositions from the Beatles era, including "Yesterday", "Lady Madonna" and "The Long and Winding Road". The inclusion of the latter songs proved especially popular and marked the first time that McCartney had performed material from the Beatles' catalogue in concert since their break-up, as he had previously vowed against playing any songs from that era. Aside from McCartney, the line-up of Wings included his wife Linda, Denny Laine, Jimmy McCulloch and Joe English, together with a four-piece horn section led by Howie Casey.

== History ==
In contrast to Wings' low-profile 1972 tours and a 1973 tour of UK theatres, Wings Over the World was a highly publicised concert tour that took place mostly in arenas and stadiums, and in the American stages of this tour the band's entourage and equipment were transported to each successive venue in five 32-ton trucks. Around 1 million people attended the 66 shows, which were staged in six legs: Britain (September 1975); Australia (November 1975); Europe (March 1976); North America (May–June 1976); a return to Europe (September 1976); and three final concerts in London at Wembley's Empire Pool (October 1976). A tour of Japan was planned, but it was cancelled by that country's authorities due to McCartney's 1972 Swedish marijuana arrest.

We [had] come from very small beginnings after the hugeness of the Beatles. We'd wanted to start something up, just to continue playing music. Then we'd wanted it to be something cool that was us, that allowed us to be free and experiment. Then we'd wanted to practice and get a really good group ... So we'd finally done all those things. Now, here we were poised to take it out and show off a bit.

— Paul McCartney, 2001

The world tour followed the release of Wings' bestselling album Venus and Mars (1975), while the follow-up album, Wings at the Speed of Sound (1976), was completed after the band's Australian concerts. Both Venus and Mars and Band on the Run (1973) were well represented in the setlist for the two 1975 legs. Songs from Speed of Sound were then introduced into the set in March 1976, and McCartney is known to have remarked: "Everything I have done since The Beatles split has been leading up to this."

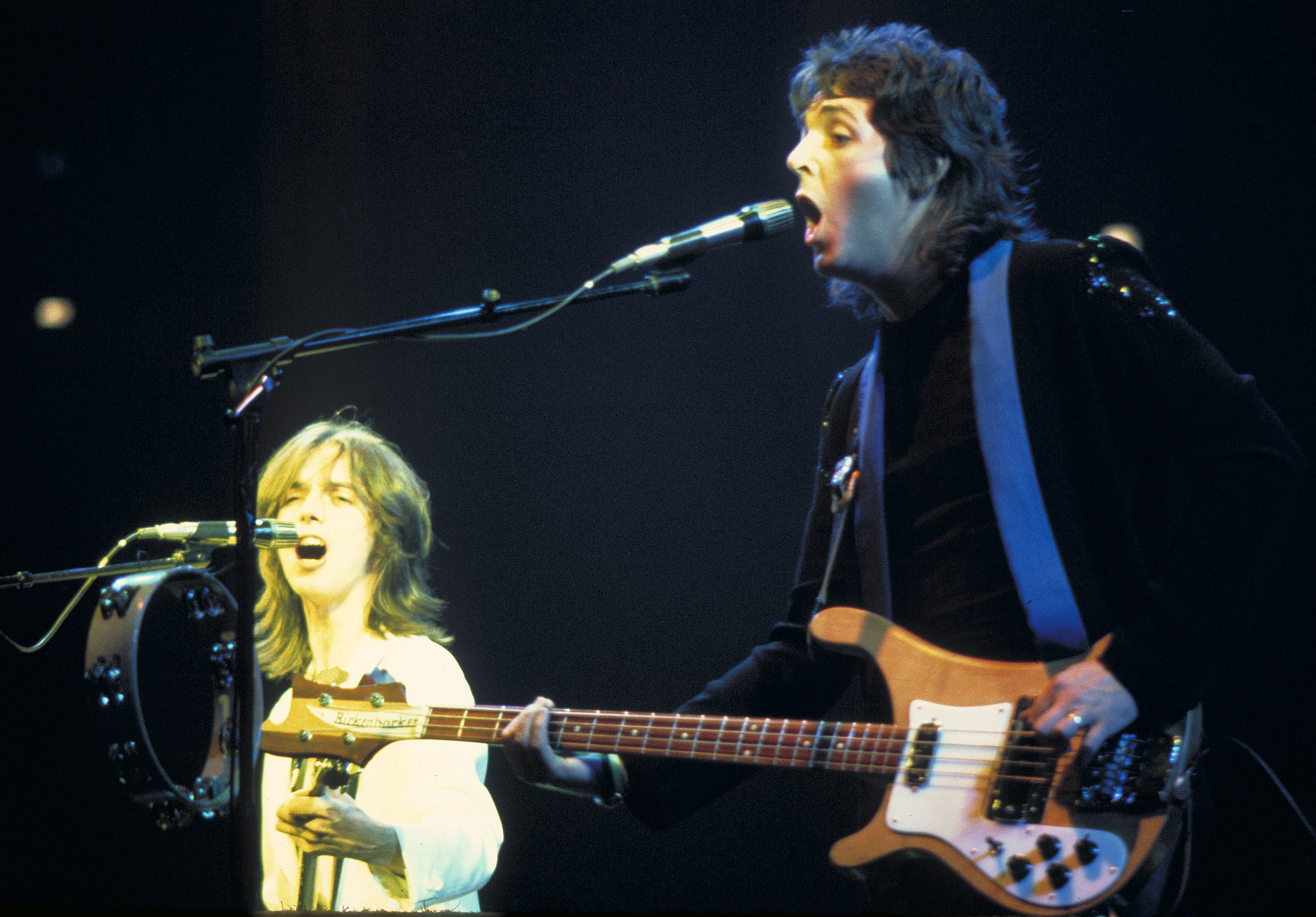
Jimmy McCulloch (left) and Paul McCartney (right) during the Wings Over the World tour.

In order to demonstrate that Wings was not merely a McCartney showcase, Denny Laine sang lead vocals on several songs, including "Go Now", reprising his vocal from the Moody Blues' 1965 hit, and Simon & Garfunkel's song "Richard Cory". Jimmy McCulloch also sang lead, on his Venus and Mars composition "Medicine Jar". Of particular interest to fans and music critics, McCartney decided to perform five of his songs from the Beatles, thereby overcoming an earlier disinclination to do any at all. Performances of "Yesterday" and "The Long and Winding Road" used muted horn arrangements in place of their original strings. In the case of the latter song, the new arrangement emphasised McCartney's objections to the version released on Let It Be in 1970, where, according to McCartney, American producer Phil Spector had added orchestral and choral parts to the Beatles' 1969 recording without his approval.

Wings' line-up for this tour was Paul McCartney (vocals, bass, piano, acoustic guitar), Linda McCartney (keyboards, backing vocals), Denny Laine (vocals, electric and acoustic guitars, bass, keyboards, percussion), Jimmy McCulloch (electric and acoustic guitars, bass, vocals) and Joe English (drums, percussion, backing vocals). They were joined by brass and woodwind players Howie Casey, Steve Howard, Thaddeus Richard and Tony Dorsey. A documentary film of the tour, titled Wings Over the World, aired on US television in November 1979.

=== Wings over America ===
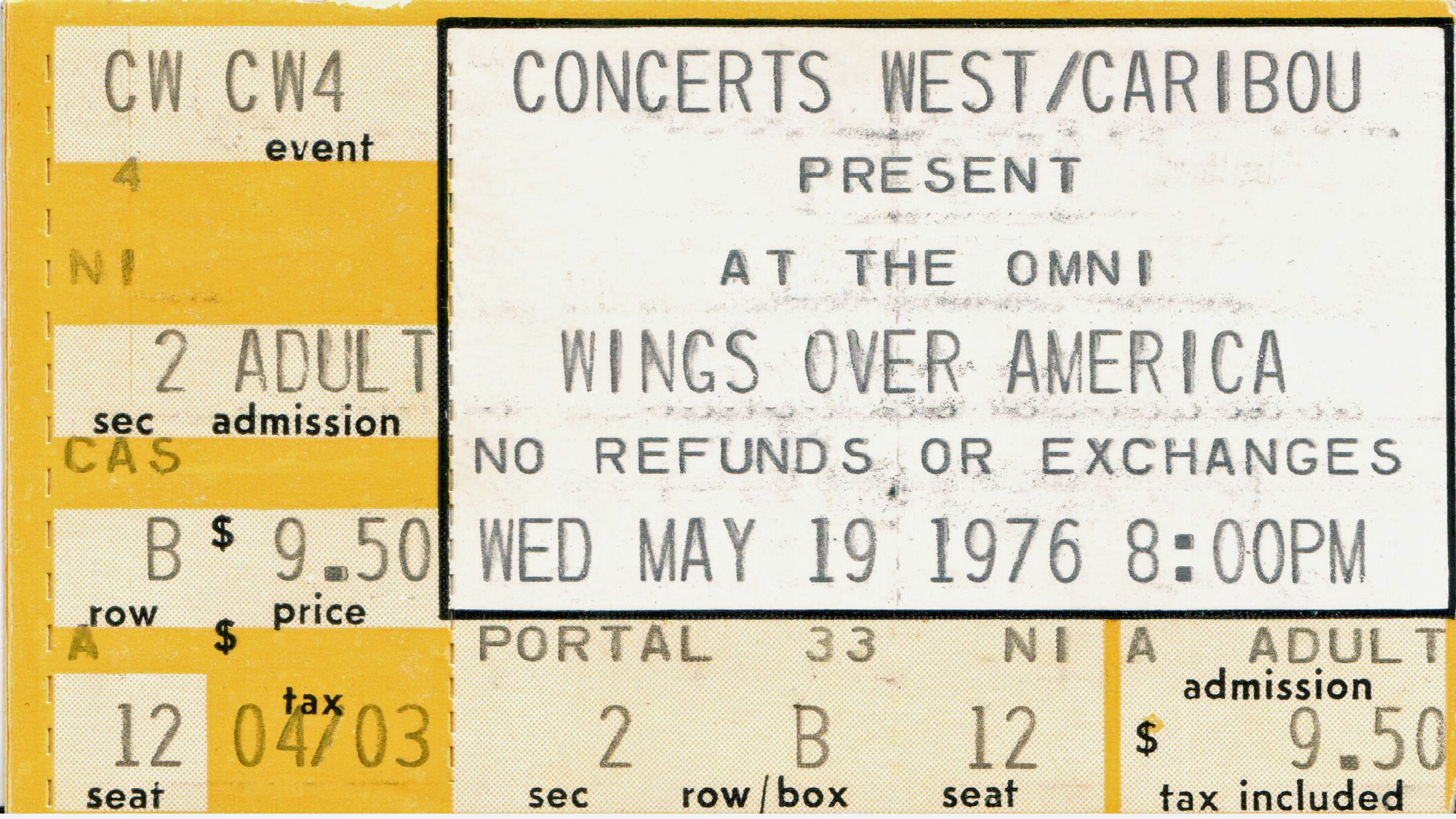
Ticket for the Atlanta concert

More than 600,000 people attended Wings' 31 shows in the United States and Canada, held between 3 May and 23 June 1976. In order to reduce the stress of moving their young family around the country during the course of the tour, the McCartneys rented houses in New York City, Dallas, Chicago and Los Angeles. Each night, they would fly in a specially chartered BAC One-Eleven to the closest of the four properties.

The beginning of the American leg of the tour was delayed for nearly a month because lead guitarist Jimmy McCulloch broke his finger drunkenly destroying a television set in a Paris hotel (though Wings claimed at the time it was a due to a fall in the bath tub). At one of the Los Angeles shows, McCartney's former Beatles bandmate Ringo Starr joined him on stage and handed him a bouquet of flowers.

Many of the concerts were professionally recorded. The best performances would later be compiled, after studio overdubs, for release as the triple album Wings over America in December 1976. In addition, a concert film combining footage from the Seattle, New York and Los Angeles shows was released in cinemas in 1980, as Rockshow, by Miramax Films.

== Tour dates ==
Date	City	Country	Venue
Great Britain
9 September 1975	Southampton	England	Gaumont Theatre
10 September 1975	Bristol	England	Bristol Hippodrome
11 September 1975	Cardiff	Wales	Capitol Theatre
12 September 1975	Manchester	England	Free Trade Hall
13 September 1975	Birmingham	England	Birmingham Hippodrome
15 September 1975	Liverpool	England	Liverpool Empire Theatre
16 September 1975	Newcastle	England	Newcastle City Hall
17 September 1975	London	England	Hammersmith Odeon
18 September 1975	London	England	Hammersmith Odeon
20 September 1975	Edinburgh	Scotland	Usher Hall
21 September 1975	Glasgow	Scotland	The Apollo
22 September 1975	Aberdeen	Scotland	Capitol Theatre
23 September 1975	Dundee	Scotland	Caird Hall
Australia
1 November 1975	Perth	Australia	Perth Entertainment Centre
4 November 1975	Adelaide	Australia	Apollo Stadium
5 November 1975	Adelaide	Australia	Apollo Stadium
7 November 1975	Sydney	Australia	Hordern Pavilion
8 November 1975	Sydney	Australia	Hordern Pavilion
10 November 1975	Brisbane	Australia	Brisbane Festival Hall
11 November 1975	Brisbane	Australia	Brisbane Festival Hall
13 November 1975	Melbourne	Australia	Sidney Myer Music Bowl
14 November 1975	Melbourne	Australia	Sidney Myer Music Bowl
Europe
20 March 1976	Copenhagen	Denmark	Falkoner Teatret
21 March 1976	Copenhagen	Denmark	Falkoner Teatret
23 March 1976	West Berlin	West Germany	Deutschlandhalle
25 March 1976	Rotterdam	Netherlands	Sportpaleis
26 March 1976	Paris	France	Pavillon de Paris
North America
3 May 1976	Fort Worth	United States	Tarrant County Convention Center
4 May 1976	Houston	United States	The Summit
7 May 1976	Detroit	United States	Detroit Olympia
8 May 1976	Detroit	United States	Detroit Olympia
9 May 1976	Toronto	Canada	Maple Leaf Gardens
10 May 1976	Richfield	United States	Richfield Coliseum
12 May 1976	Philadelphia	United States	The Spectrum
14 May 1976	Philadelphia	United States	The Spectrum
15 May 1976	Landover	United States	Capital Centre
16 May 1976	Landover	United States	Capital Centre
18 May 1976	Atlanta	United States	Omni Coliseum
19 May 1976	Atlanta	United States	Omni Coliseum
21 May 1976	Uniondale	United States	Nassau Veterans Memorial Coliseum
22 May 1976	Boston	United States	Boston Garden
24 May 1976	New York City	United States	Madison Square Garden
25 May 1976	New York City	United States	Madison Square Garden
27 May 1976	Cincinnati	United States	Riverfront Coliseum
29 May 1976	Kansas City	United States	Kemper Arena
31 May 1976	Chicago	United States	Chicago Stadium
1 June 1976	Chicago	United States	Chicago Stadium
2 June 1976	Chicago	United States	Chicago Stadium
4 June 1976	Saint Paul	United States	St. Paul Civic Center
7 June 1976	Denver	United States	McNichols Sports Arena
10 June 1976	Seattle	United States	Kingdome
13 June 1976	Daly City	United States	Cow Palace
14 June 1976	Daly City	United States	Cow Palace
16 June 1976	San Diego	United States	San Diego Sports Arena
18 June 1976	Tucson	United States	Tucson Community Center
21 June 1976	Inglewood	United States	The Forum
22 June 1976	Inglewood	United States	The Forum
23 June 1976	Inglewood	United States	The Forum
Europe
19 September 1976	Vienna	Austria	Wiener Stadthalle
21 September 1976	Zagreb	Yugoslavia	Dom Sportova
25 September 1976	Venice	Italy	Piazza San Marco
27 September 1976	Munich	West Germany	Olympiahalle
19 October 1976	London	England	Empire Pool
20 October 1976	London	England	Empire Pool
21 October 1976	London	England	Empire Pool

=== Box office score data ===
List of box office score data with date, city, venue, attendance, gross, references
Date (1976)	City	Venue	Attendance	Gross	Ref(s)
12 May	Philadelphia, United States	The Spectrum	37,000 / 37,000	$336,000	
14 May	Philadelphia, United States	The Spectrum	37,000 / 37,000	$336,000	
27 May	Cincinnati, United States	Riverfront Coliseum	21,360 / 21,360	$178,398	
13 June	Daly City, United States	Cow Palace	29,000 / 29,000	$246,500	
14 June	Daly City, United States	Cow Palace	29,000 / 29,000	$246,500	

== See also ==
- Rockshow

== Sources ==
- Miles, Barry (2007) [1998]. The Beatles: A Diary – An Intimate Day by Day History. London: Omnibus. ISBN 978-1-84772-082-5.
