= Listen to What the Man Said =

1975 single by Wings

Single by Wings

from the album Venus and Mars
- B-side: "Love in Song"
- Released: 16 May 1975
- Recorded: 31 January – 10 March 1975
- Studio: Sea-Saint Studios, New Orleans; Wally Heider Studios, Los Angeles; Sunset Sound Recorders Studio, Los Angeles
- Genre: Pop; disco; yacht rock
- Length: 3:57
- Label: Capitol
- Songwriters: Paul McCartney; Linda McCartney
- Producer: Paul McCartney

Wings singles chronology
"Junior's Farm" (1974)	"Listen to What the Man Said" (1975)	"Letting Go" (1975)

Licensed audio
- "Listen to What the Man Said" on YouTube

Single cover reverse side

"Listen to What the Man Said" is a hit single from Wings' 1975 album Venus and Mars. The song featured new member Joe English on drums, with guest musicians Dave Mason on guitar and Tom Scott on soprano saxophone. It was a number 1 single on the Billboard Hot 100 in the US the week of 19 July 1975 and reached number 1 in Canada on the RPM National Top Singles Chart. It also reached number 6 in the UK, and reached the top ten in Ireland, Norway and New Zealand and the top twenty in the Netherlands. The single was certified Gold by the Recording Industry Association of America for sales of over one million copies.

== Recording ==
"Listen to What the Man Said" was recorded in early 1975 by Wings during their New Orleans sessions for Venus and Mars. It was a song for which Paul McCartney had high hopes, but early recordings did not live up to the song's potential. McCartney said in 1975 of his initial opinion of the song, "It was one of the songs we’d gone in with high hopes for. Whenever I would play it on the piano, people would say ‘Oh, I like that one.’ But when we did the backing track, we thought we didn't really get it together at all."

It was guest guitarist Dave Mason who suggested the high-doubling on the guitar parts. McCartney initially told him to play the same notes as him, but decided Mason's idea was better. After Mason added guitar overdubs, the band was still dissatisfied. However, once Scott recorded the sax solo, judgements were changed. Although several takes of the solo were recorded, the very first take was the one that was used. McCartney said of Tom Scott's impact on the track, "Someone said [famous jazz musician] ‘Tom Scott lives near here.’ We said, yeah, give him a ring, see if he turns up, and he turned up within half an hour! There he was, with his sax, and he sat down in the studio playing through. The engineer was recording it. We kept all the notes he was playing casually. He came in and I said ‘I think that’s it.’ He said ‘Did you record that?’ I said yes, and we listened to it back. No one could believe it, so he went out and tried a few more, but they weren't as good. He'd had all the feel on this early take, the first take." The effect of a kiss smack heard on the track was recorded by engineer Alan O'Duffy, who taped Linda doing it.

The end of the song also features a small link used to transition into the next song on Venus and Mars, "Treat Her Gently/Lonely Old People".

You either have to leave it and stop 'Listen to What the Man Said' dead or you spill over into the next little link piece. I just like that link myself, and thought no one's going to mind that little extra on the record.

— Paul McCartney, Paul McCartney: In His Own Words

== Lyrics ==
The song is an optimistic love song. Even though love may be blind or may cause separated lovers to suffer, the singer believes that love will prevail. This is in accordance with what “the man” said. "The man" is not explicitly identified, but might be God. Author Vincent Benitez believes that "McCartney is advising everyone to stick with the basics of life, which for him means focusing on love."

The seemingly random words which are spoken before the music begins, according to Chip Madinger and Mark Easter's 2000 book Eight Arms To Hold You, are said by McCartney. "Paul's impression of Leo Nocentelli, the guitarist for The Meters (not Wolfman Jack, as has been incorrectly stated), which was placed at the beginning of the song, was taped when he recorded his vocal track," the book says. McCartney says: "All right, OK... very good to see you down in New Orleans, man, yeah, yeah. Reet, yeah, yeah..." The word "reet" is jazz slang, meaning "good, proper, excellent".

== Reception ==
Allmusic critic Stephen Thomas Erlewine called "Listen to What the Man Said" "a typically sweet and lovely melody". Billboard described it as a "perfect mix of quality and commerciality." Cash Box said "clarinets spice the song and give it a distinct flavor while McCartney's supple vocal style will make this an automatic addition to almost anyone’s play list." Paul Nelson of Rolling Stone called it "deliciously catchy" and "as fine an example of slick, professional entertainment and carefully crafted 'product' as has ever hit the airwaves". Author John Blaney described the song as "a slice of radio-friendly pop" and "a joyous celebration of love and life, buoyed by Linda's equally exuberant backing vocals...". Benitez described the song as "another great example of McCartney-style pop, a buoyant and optimistic song about love where words and music are wedded together". Authors Roy Carr and Tony Tyler note about the song that "artful and sensitive production elevate what was originally a piece of inconsequential whimsy into what can only be described as High Pop", also describing the song as "likeable" and "hummable". Author Chris Ingham described the song as "superior pop".

The song was also included on the numerous greatest hits compilations, including 1987's All the Best!, 2001's Wingspan: Hits and History, 2016's Pure McCartney and 2025's Wings. It was also featured on The 7" Singles Box in 2022. However, it was not included on the 1978 Wings compilation, Wings Greatest.

The song title inspired "Listen to What the Fans Said", a letters column in the Wings Fan Club magazine, Club Sandwich.

== Chart performance ==
=== Weekly charts ===
Chart (1975)	Peak position
Australia (Kent Music Report)	14
Canada Top Singles (RPM)	1
Canada RPM Adult Contemporary	2
France (SNEP)	38
Germany (GfK)	42
Ireland (IRMA)	4
Japan (Oricon)	46
Netherlands (Dutch Top 40)	18
New Zealand (Recorded Music NZ)	7
Norway (VG-lista)	3
UK Singles Chart (Official Charts Company)	6
US Billboard Hot 100	1
US Adult Contemporary (Billboard)	8
Cash Box Top 100	1

=== Year-end charts ===
Chart (1975)	Position
Australia (Kent Music Report)	100
Canada (RPM 100)	13
New Zealand	25
US Billboard Hot 100	42
US Cash Box Top 100	45

== Certifications ==
Region	Certification	Certified units/sales
United States (RIAA)	Gold	1,000,000^{^}
^{^} Shipments figures based on certification alone.

== Owl City version ==
"Listen to What the Man Said"

Song by Owl City

from the album The Art of McCartney
- Released: 17 November 2014
- Length: 3:36
- Label: Arctic Poppy via Kobalt
- Songwriters: Paul McCartney; Linda McCartney
- Producer: Ralph Sall

American electronica project Owl City covered the song and released it on 17 November 2014. It was released from the compilation album, The Art of McCartney, as a tribute to the English artist.

=== Background ===
When asked about covering the track, Adam Young of Owl City stated, "I think they said 'We'd like to have somebody cover one of these three songs on the list.' I'm not sure why they reached out to me. I feel so humbled."

=== Charts ===
==== Weekly charts ====
Weekly chart performance for "Listen to What the Man Said"
Chart (2014–15)	Peak position
UK Christian Songs (Cross Rhythms)	1

==== Year-end charts ====
Year-end chart performance for "Listen to What the Man Said"
Chart (2015)	Peak position
UK Christian Songs (Cross Rhythms)	62

== Covers ==
- The song was covered (as "L.T.W.T.M.S.") by indie pop band The Trouble with Sweeney on their 2004 EP Fishtown Briefcase.
- Ex-Wings member Laurence Juber covered the song on his 2005 album One Wing, despite not being a member of the band at the time of the song's recording and release.
- Former Wings member Denny Laine covered "Listen to What the Man Said" in 1996 on his album Wings at the Sound of Denny Laine.
- In 2008, Freedy Johnston covered this song on his album My Favourite Waste of Time.
- The chorus elements from the single were used in the 2003 Dance single "Just The Way You Are" by the Italian dance group Milky. Because of this, Paul and Linda McCartney were given credit on the single.

== Personnel ==
- Paul McCartney – lead vocals, bass, guitars, keyboards, clavinet, percussion
- Linda McCartney – keyboards, backing vocals, percussion
- Denny Laine – vocals, guitars, percussion
- Jimmy McCulloch – guitars
- Joe English – drums, percussion
- Dave Mason – guitar
- Tom Scott – soprano saxophone
