= Geoff Britton =

English drummer (b. 1943)

- Born: Geoffrey Britton; 1 August 1943 (age 83); Lewisham, South East London, England
- Genres: Rock; Power pop
- Instrument: Drums
- Years active: 1960s–present

Geoffrey Britton (born 1 August 1943) is an English rock drummer known for his work with Wings from May 1974 to January 1975, where he was featured on their fourth studio album Venus and Mars (1975).

== Career ==
Britton was born in Lewisham, South East London. He was a member of the progressive rock band East of Eden which formed in Bristol from June to December 1969 and recorded the album Snafu. Afterward he joined the Wild Angels. After leaving Wings in early 1975 Britton was a member of Manfred Mann's Earth Band from 1978 to 1979, playing on the Angel Station album. In 1977 he was in a group, Rough Diamond, formed by David Byron of Uriah Heep, recording in London's Roundhouse Studios. In the early 1980s, he joined the power pop group the Keys, whose one album was produced by Joe Jackson.
