= Joe English (musician) =

American drummer (born 1949)

- Born: July 2, 1949 (age 77); Rochester, New York, U.S.
- Genres: Rock; Christian rock
- Occupations: Musician; singer; songwriter
- Instruments: Drums; percussion; vocals
- Years active: 1975–1990s
- Formerly of: Wings; Kingfish; Sea Level; The Joe English Band; Compassion All Star Band

Joe English (born July 2, 1949) is an American musician, vocalist and songwriter who, during the 1970s, played drums in Paul McCartney's band Wings and in the rock band Sea Level, among others.

== Biography ==
Born on July 2, 1949, in Rochester, New York, Joe English was a member of the band Jam Factory, a group based in Syracuse, that evolved into the Tall Dogs Orchestra of Macon, Georgia. Searching for an opportunity to expand his talent, he answered an ad for a drummer in early 1975. The address led him to the basement of an old building where, much to his surprise, he found himself face to face with Paul McCartney. The audition was for McCartney's Wings, and English got the job. His first album with Wings was Venus and Mars and, one album later, he would even take the lead vocals for the song, "Must Do Something About It" from Wings at the Speed of Sound. He accompanied Wings on tour and was the drummer on the Wings Over the World tour.

In November 1977, during the recording sessions for Wings' London Town, English became homesick and returned to Macon, Georgia, where he began playing with Chuck Leavell's band Sea Level. This ended his time with McCartney and Wings.

Following his Christian salvation experience, he formed the Joe English Band, performing as lead singer and drummer. The band toured the world, playing with other major Christian bands of the era, including Petra, DeGarmo & Key, Mylon LeFevre and Servant. In 1983, The Joe English Band toured with Servant during the Great American Album Giveaway Tour. The band recorded a release without English's vocals called AKA Forerunner. The band included John Lawry, who left to play for Petra in 1984. In 1986, English played in former Petra vocalist Greg X. Volz's band, Pieces of Eight. In the late 1980s, English joined Randy Stonehill, Phil Keaggy, Rick Cua and others as part of the Compassion All Star Band. In 1988, the band recorded live One by One, their only album together.

English played the snare with his right hand and the hi-hat and ride cymbals with his left, a technique commonly termed "open handed". He has been unable to play drums professionally since the late 1990s, due to chronic problems with his ankles.

In 1990, English joined the Word of Faith Fellowship in Rutherfordton, North Carolina. As of 2020, he remains a member and is involved in music within the church.

== Discography ==
With Paul McCartney & Wings

- Venus and Mars (1975)
- Wings at the Speed of Sound (1976)
- Wings over America (1976)
- London Town (1978)

With Kingfish

- Trident (1978)

With Sea Level

- On the Edge (1978, Capricorn)
- Long Walk on a Short Pier (1979, Capricorn)
- Ball Room (1980), Arista)
- Best of Sea Level (1997, Capricorn)

With Joe English Band

- Lights in the World (1980)
- Held Accountable (1982)
- Press On (1983)
- Live (1984)
- What You Need (1985)
- The Best Is Yet to Come (1985)
- Back to Basics: English 101 (1988)
- Lights in the World / Held Accountable (1991)

Compassion All Star Band

- One by One (1988)
