= Jimmy McCulloch =

Scottish musician (1953–1979)

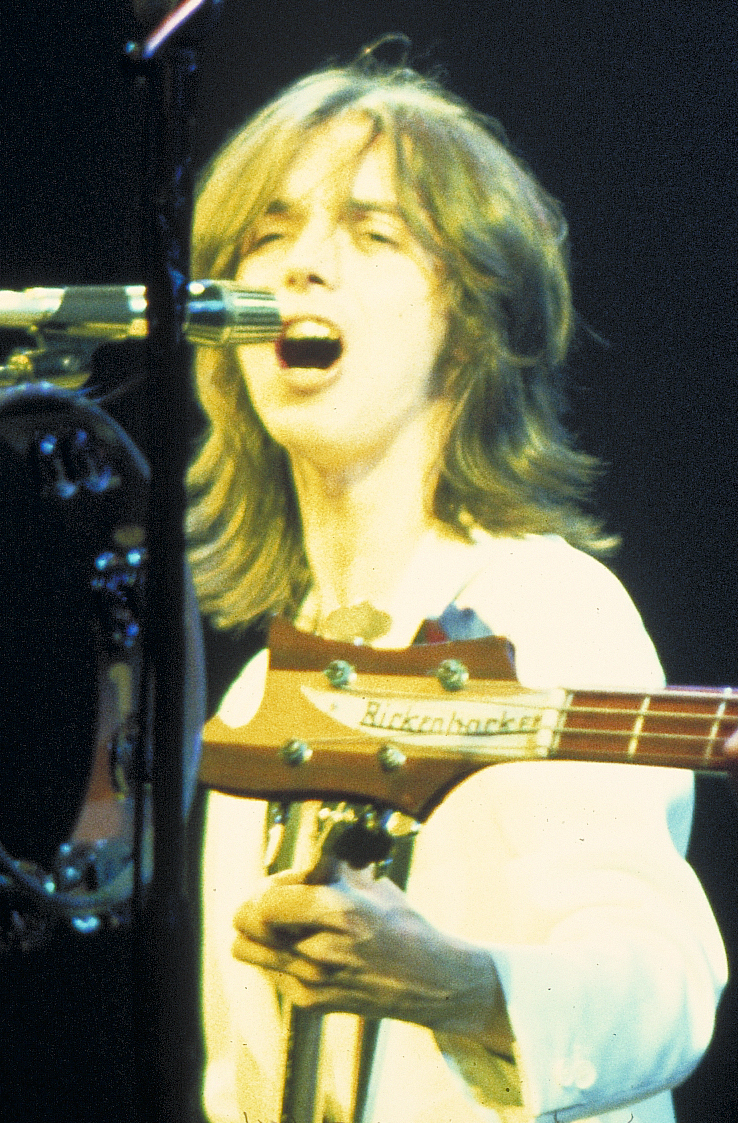
- McCulloch on stage with Wings in 1976

Background information
- Born: James McCulloch; 4 June 1953; Dumbarton, Dunbartonshire, Scotland
- Died: 27 September 1979 (aged 26) Maida Vale, London, England
- Genres: Rock; hard rock
- Occupations: Musician; songwriter
- Instruments: Guitar; vocals; bass guitar
- Years active: 1967–1979
- Formerly of: One in a Million; Wings; Thunderclap Newman; Stone the Crows; Small Faces; The Dukes; Blue

James McCulloch (4 June 1953 – 27 September 1979) was a Scottish musician best known for playing lead guitar and bass and singing backing and occasional lead vocals as a member of Paul McCartney's band Wings from 1974 to 1977. He was also a member of the Glasgow psychedelic band One in a Million (formerly known as the Jaygars), Thunderclap Newman, and Stone the Crows.

McCulloch also made appearances on many albums, including John Entwistle's Whistle Rymes in 1972, as lead guitarist playing alongside Peter Frampton on "Apron Strings" and "I Feel Better". McCulloch also played guitar on Roger Daltrey's album One of the Boys which was released in 1977.

McCulloch was a friend of the Who and a member of the band Thunderclap Newman, which was created and produced by his mentor Pete Townshend. He was discovered dead in his London home in September 1979, aged 26, of a morphine overdose/poisoning.

== Biography ==
McCulloch was born in Dumbarton and raised in Clydebank and Cumbernauld, Scotland. The McCulloch family relocated to London when Jimmy was 13. He was inspired by Django Reinhardt and began to play the guitar aged 11.

He made his performance debut as the guitarist for the Jaygars, which was later known as One in a Million. One in a Million performed live in support of The Who during their tour of Scotland in 1967. That year, One in a Million released their "Fredereek Hernando"/"Double Sight" single on MGM. The single is now highly collectable, and an expensive purchase, now classed as a classic and obscure UK psychedelic release. Double Sight, a CD compilation of these and other songs written and recorded by the band, was released in 2009.

Though the band was unbilled in the promotional posters for the event, McCulloch fronted One In A Million as they and countless other bands performed at the 14 Hour Technicolor Dream event at the London Alexandra Palace in April 1967. That year, One in a Million also performed live at The Upper Cut and other London venues.

McCulloch first rose to fame in 1969 when he joined Pete Townshend's friends, Andy 'Thunderclap' Newman (piano) and songwriter John 'Speedy' Keen (vocals, drums), to form the band Thunderclap Newman. The band enjoyed a UK No. 1 hit with "Something in the Air" that year. Thunderclap Newman's album, Hollywood Dream, on which the title instrumental, written by McCulloch and his brother, sold well but was not as successful as their hit single. (Reissues of the album include another McCulloch brothers song, "I See It All".) From January to mid-April 1971, the band toured England, Scotland, The Netherlands, and Scandinavia and disbanded shortly thereafter.

In October 1971, McCulloch played guitar in concert with John Mayall and the Bluesbreakers in England, Scotland and Germany. On 31 October 1971 McCulloch's band Bent Frame made its performance debut in London. The band subsequently renamed itself the Jimmy McCulloch Band and toured England and Scotland in support of Leslie West's Mountain in February 1972. By then, McCulloch had done session work for Klaus Voormann, Harry Nilsson, Steve Ellis, John Entwistle, and others.

In June 1972, McCulloch joined the blues rock band (and fellow Mayall-school alumni) Stone the Crows to replace guitarist Les Harvey, who had been electrocuted on stage. McCulloch helped Stone the Crows to complete their Ontinuous Performance album by playing on the tracks "Sunset Cowboy" and "Good Time Girl". Stone the Crows disbanded in June 1973.

In 1973, McCulloch played guitar on John Keen's album, Previous Convictions, had a brief stint in Blue and played guitar on Brian Joseph Friel's debut album under the pseudonym 'The Phantom'.

=== Paul McCartney & Wings and after ===
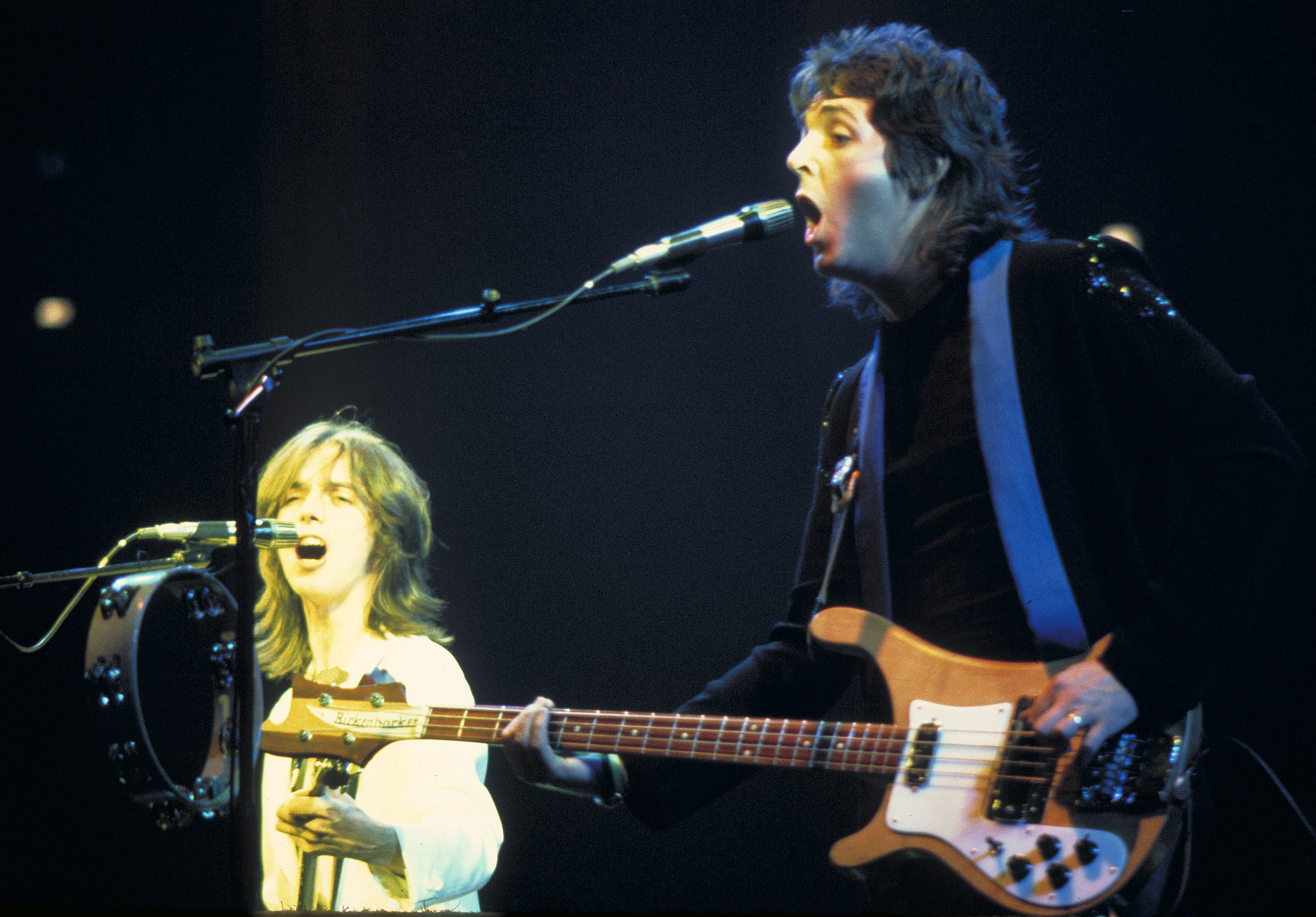
McCulloch (left) and McCartney in 1976

McCulloch first met Paul McCartney in August 1973, after the departure of Henry McCullough from Wings. McCulloch joined Wings in May 1974. His debut track with them was "Junior's Farm." McCulloch composed the music for the anti-drug song "Medicine Jar" on the album Venus and Mars and the similar "Wino Junko" on Wings at the Speed of Sound. He also sang both. Colin Allen, who had been drummer for Stone the Crows, wrote lyrics for both songs.

During his time with Wings, McCulloch formed White Line with his brother Jack on drums and Dave Clarke on bass, keyboards, and vocals. They played several impromptu gigs and released a single, "Call My Name"/"Too Many Miles". A 13-track album, White Line – Complete, was released in 1994 on Clarke's Mouse Records. Jimmy McCulloch and White Line appeared on the British television programme Supersonic on 27 November 1976. In addition, McCulloch recorded and produced two unreleased songs by the Khyber Trifles and had occasionally performed live (in London and their native Glasgow) with the band. He also played guitar on Roy Harper's album Bullinamingvase and Ricci Martin's album Beached, in 1977.

McCulloch's alcoholism periodically became a problem while Wings was recording in the studio or performing on tour. McCulloch was arrested for reckless driving during Wings' 1974 stay near Nashville, Tennessee. On 26 March 1976 at the Paris Hotel George V, David Cassidy blocked a punch that the even more drunk McCulloch was about to deliver, which led McCulloch to fall and break his pinky. Perhaps due to contractual or insurance reasons, McCulloch falsely attributed his broken pinky to a fall on a wet bathroom floor. The onset of the Wings Over America tour was consequently and expensively delayed by three weeks as the pinky recovered. McCulloch was thrown out of Wings by McCartney in August 1977, during the recording sessions for "Mull of Kintyre", allegedly for a drunken rage at the McCartneys' Scottish farm estate that included McCulloch smashing eggs produced by Linda McCartney's pet hens.

In September 1977, McCulloch joined the reformed Small Faces during the latter band's nine date tour of England that month. He played guitar on the Small Faces' album, 78 in the Shade. In early 1978, McCulloch started a band called Wild Horses with Brian Robertson, Jimmy Bain and Kenney Jones, but both McCulloch and Jones left the band soon afterward. In 1979, McCulloch joined the Dukes. His last recorded song, "Heartbreaker", appeared on their only album, The Dukes.

A melodic, heavily blues-infused guitarist, McCulloch normally used a Gibson SG and a Gibson Les Paul, and he occasionally played bass when McCartney, Wings' usual bassist, or Denny Laine were playing piano or acoustic guitar, which he used Fender Precision or Fender Jazz Basses. For acoustic guitar work, he used Ovation acoustic guitars.

In 2021, an episode of BBC's The Repair Shop featured two platinum discs for Wings at the Speed of Sound and Wings over America, presented to McCulloch for his work with Wings, which were taken for restoration by his cousin. In the same year, a biography on Jimmy’s life and career, Little Wing: The Jimmy McCulloch Story, was published as well.

== Death ==
McCulloch was found dead by his brother in his flat in Maida Vale, London, on 27 September 1979. He was 26 years old. An autopsy revealed that he had alcohol, morphine and cannabis in his body; the coroner stated he died of morphine poisoning. The slightly-built McCulloch was not known to be suicidal or to use heroin or morphine; rather, Scottish spirits were reportedly his years-long usual drug of choice. By September 1979, a doctor had prescribed McCulloch an "unknown dosage and quantity of Doriden". An overdose of this dangerously powerful oral sedative (long since withdrawn from global pharmaceutical markets), especially when it is ingested with alcohol or drugs such as codeine, can cause the human body to produce an effect that mimics morphine poisoning.
