= Thrillington =

1977 studio album released pseudonymously by Paul McCartney

Studio album by Percy "Thrills" Thrillington
- Released: 29 April 1977
- Recorded: 15–17 June 1971
- Studios: EMI, London
- Genres: Easy listening; jazz; lounge
- Length: 44:50
- Labels: Regal Zonophone (UK); Capitol (US)
- Producer: Percy "Thrills" Thrillington

Paul McCartney chronology
Ram (1971)	Thrillington (1977)	McCartney II (1980)

Singles from Thrillington
- 1. "Uncle Albert/Admiral Halsey" Released: 29 April 1977

Thrillington is an album by the English musician Paul McCartney, recorded under the pseudonym Percy "Thrills" Thrillington. An easy listening instrumental covers album of Paul and Linda McCartney's 1971 album Ram, it was released in April 1977 in the UK and in May 1977 in the US. Paul conceived the project shortly before Ram's release in May 1971. It was arranged and conducted by Richard Anthony Hewson, who hired a variety of musicians, including string, woodwind and brass sections, and backing vocalists.

Recorded in June 1971 at EMI Studios in London, the album was shelved upon the formation of Wings, and was not released for nearly six years. Before issuing the project, McCartney promoted it through advertisements in British newspapers, which provided the background for Percy Thrillington. Despite McCartney's efforts to keep his involvement a secret, music reviewers deduced that he was Thrillington. McCartney formally revealed himself to be Percy Thrillington in 1989, and the following year also admitted to being "Clint Harrigan", who wrote the album's liner notes.

Upon its release, Thrillington received little attention and sold poorly, eventually going out of print and becoming a collector's item. It was first reissued on CD in 1995 and was later included as part of the deluxe edition of Ram in 2012. It remains an obscure album in McCartney's discography.

== Recording ==
Thrillington is an intrumental cover of Paul and Linda McCartney's album Ram. Paul conceived the project shortly before Ram's release in May 1971. (Note: McCartney had previously composed The Family Way, a collaborative soundtrack album with George Martin in 1967.) He explained: "It all came about because I wanted someone to do a big-band version of Ram — but there were no takers, [so] I thought that I'd better be that someone." It was arranged and conducted by Richard Anthony Hewson, who was asked about the project before Ram had yet been released. Hewson recalled:

[Paul] called and said, How'd you fancy orchestrating the Ram album for an orchestra, you know, without any vocals?' He just wanted to do it. Just make an orchestral album of it. We didn't really discuss how it was going to be presented at the time. Nobody sort of thought of it.

The album was recorded from 15–17 June 1971 at EMI Studios in London. Paul produced the sessions, while Tony Clark engineered, assisted by Alan Parsons. Clark recalled not having heard Ram before signing on, but decided not to after a good first session, saying: "Whatever I had to offer the session should be new, not simply a copy of Paul's album." Hewson chose the musicians, who were players he worked with regularly, which included Herbie Flowers (bass), Steve Grey (piano), Vic Flick (guitar), Roger Coulan (Hammond organ), Clem Cattini and Dougie Wright (drums), and Jim Lawless and Chris Karan (percussion). Hewson also hired a string section (ten violins and four cellos, led by Tony Gilbert), and woodwind and brass players who had various jazz and classical music backgrounds. The Dolmetsch Consort provided recorder parts, while the Swingle Singers and the Mike Sammes Singers (who sang on the Beatles' "I Am the Walrus") provided vocals.

Recording moved swiftly. According to Flowers, none of the players had heard Ram before the sessions. There was no improvisation and they read strictly from sheet music. Clark mixed the album on 18 June, after which Paul shelved the project as he formed his new band, Wings.

== Music ==
According to author Luca Perasi, Thrillington taps into genres from vaudeville and jazz, to lounge music, reggae and country. John Blaney and Philip Norman describe its style as easy listening. Authors Allan Kozinn and Adrian Sinclair describe the Thrillington arrangements of "Too Many People", "Eat at Home" and "The Back Seat of My Car" featuring "symphonic pop" arrangements. "3 Legs" has a jazzy feel, while "Dear Boy" and "Heart of the Country" feature vocal embellishments. "Monkberry Moon Delight" features "luscious" trumpet and trombones, and "Long Haired Lady" is embellished by saxophones and trumpets. According to AllMusic's Bruce Eder, "What makes these and the other cuts a special pleasure for fans of the original album is that they all retain their beat, even as Hewson's arrangements carry them in some surprising directions." On "Smile Away", percussionist Chris Karan added a cuíca, a Brazilian percussion instrument used in samba and reggae. Karan did not know how to play the instrument but Hewson kept it in the song, which Kozinn and Sinclair describe as sounding like "a barking dog" or, in Hewson's words, "a grunty pig". The album's closer, "The Back Seat of My Car", ends with the sound of dripping water coming from a studio toilet, which Clark added as a form of humour.

== Release and promotion ==
In early 1977, Paul decided to finally release the project after six years. The reason for the delay has been debated, although McCartney himself said in 1992: "What I didn't realise was that no one would want to release an album like that. Not even then. And no way would it get released now." To promote the project, he placed a series of advertisements in the Classified sections of newspapers such as the Evening Standard, The Times and The Observer, which ran between 14 February and 29 April. The ads, which Paul described as "one of our madcap publicity schemes", provided the fictional conductor Percy "Thrills" Thrillington's backstory. The McCartneys even took his photograph: "[W]e invented it all, Linda and I, and we went around southern Ireland and found a guy in a field, a young farmer, and asked if he minded doing some photographic modelling for us. We wanted to find someone that no one could possibly trace, paid him the going rate, and photographed him in a field, wearing a sweater and then wearing an evening suit. But he never quite looked Percy Thrillington enough."

The album's cover art was created by Jeff Cummins of Hipgnosis, which depicted a ram dressed in a tuxedo seated playing a violin in front of a music stand. The back cover shows a Linda McCartney photo of the recording session. Taken from the control room, it depicts the ram-headed Thrillington discussing the music with the musicians, while Paul's face is seen through the glass window. Thrillington's biography, tracklist and production credits are also listed, while the sleeve notes are credited to Clint Harrigan, which was the pseudonym Paul used for the Wild Life (1971) liner notes. Percy Thrillington was also signed to McCartney's company MPL.

Thrillington was released on 29 April 1977 in the UK (on the Regal Zonophone label) and in the US on 17 May (through Capitol Records). A single, "Uncle Albert/Admiral Halsey" b/w "Eat at Home", was released the same day as the British release. Paul's publicist Tony Brainsby maintained his denial of involvement in the album through press inquiries. Despite Paul and Linda's promotional efforts, the British press were unimpressed. Hewson recalled that the press grew "fed up" because "everyone knew it was made up". Hewson was also disappointed he was not allowed to tour the album as Percy Thrillington, believing "it would have been wonderful if it had been presented with a proper orchestra and good musicians, playing live." According to Perasi and Norman, the album only sold "a handful of copies".

== Reception ==
Professional ratings
Review scores
Source	Rating
AllMusic	3/5 stars
MusicHound Rock	2/5 stars
Rolling Stone	unfavourable

Reviews published in NME and Variety acknowledged Percy Thrillington as McCartney. Discussing the music itself, the former's Patrick Humphries found Thrillington bland, while the latter's Pete Silverton described it as "a collection of 'band' arrangements of Macca tunes of such crushing vapidity that James Last probably wouldn't listen to it". Silverton also found the promotional ads successfully "creat[ed] an aura of mystique around an otherwise solidly drab piece of product". Variety noted that "Whether Percy Thrillington is Paul McCartney or not is really irrelevant. What matters is that he (they) is (are) having fun." Reviewing the single, Record Mirror's David Brown gave it two out of five stars, writing: "More money to support the destitute McCartney family."

Later reviews have been mostly positive. In AllMusic, Eder said that compared to Ram, Thrillington is "a very potent work in its own right" that "avoids the temptation to deliver flaccid elevator music, in favour of very precise playing and finely detailed arrangements". Blaney argues that the album is one of McCartney's "more intriguing" projects. He writes that it was "a bold experiment that presented some of [McCartney's] most complex and melodic compositions in a new light. It may even have been a clever ironic statement that poked fun at critics who claimed that, post-Beatles, all he could produce was muzak". Hewson later called Thrillington his "most rewarding" work. The guitarist Mike Keneally is a fan of the album; his song "5 Legs" on his album Wooden Smoke (2002) is a tribute to "3 Legs". He told the music journalist Ian Peel: "To me Thrillington is reminiscent of incidental music from a late-sixties British spy TV show, something with a lot of cars in it and very bad editing. Maybe Roger Moore on a lark, acting badly for the fun of it." However, the album remains an obscure record that has tended to be omitted from critical analyses of McCartney's oeuvre.

== Post-release ==
Shortly after its release, Thrillington quickly went out of print and became a collector's item. McCartney finally admitted his role to journalist Peter Palmiere at a Los Angeles press conference on 27 November 1989 during the Paul McCartney World Tour: "What a great question to end the conference. The world needs to know! But seriously, it was me and Linda – and we kept it a secret for a long time, but now the world knows! – you blew it!" In 1990, Paul McCartney also admitted to Palmiere, via an autograph request, that he was indeed Clint Harrigan – the liner notes writer for Thrillington and Wings' Wild Life album. The first person to reveal the identity of Clint Harrigan was John Lennon, who stated as much during a well-publicised letter feud with McCartney in Melody Maker ("And your writing inside of the Wings album [Wild Life] isn't exactly the Realist is it?") in December 1971. The full story of the Thrillington album was told in detail in 1995 by Matt Hurwitz in Beatles fanzine Good Day Sunshine. For his book The Unknown Paul McCartney (2002), Ian Peel tracked down various musicians who brought McCartney's vision to life – including Hewson, Flowers and the Mike Sammes Singers – as well as those who were involved in creating its mythology.

Thrillington was remastered and reissued on CD for the first time in May 1995, although this release was not promoted and went out of print quickly. Another CD reissue followed in June 2004. The album was reissued again as part of the deluxe edition of Ram on 21 May 2012. This release was the first time Thrillington was credited to McCartney's name. To coincide with this release, McCartney started a Twitter account under the Thrillington name, posting tweets like the original newspaper announcements. The album was reissued on CD, vinyl, and limited-edition coloured vinyl on 18 May 2018.

== Track listing ==
Side one
No.	Title	Writer(s)	Length
1.	"Too Many People"	Paul McCartney	4:31
2.	"3 Legs"	Paul McCartney	3:41
3.	"Ram On"	Paul McCartney	2:49
4.	"Dear Boy"	Paul & Linda McCartney	2:50
5.	"Uncle Albert/Admiral Halsey"	Paul & Linda McCartney	4:56
6.	"Smile Away"	Paul McCartney	4:39

Side two
No.	Title	Writer(s)	Length
1.	"Heart of the Country"	Paul & Linda McCartney	2:27
2.	"Monkberry Moon Delight"	Paul & Linda McCartney	4:36
3.	"Eat at Home"	Paul & Linda McCartney	3:28
4.	"Long Haired Lady"	Paul & Linda McCartney	5:44
5.	"The Back Seat of My Car"	Paul McCartney	4:51

== Personnel ==
Musicians according to authors Luca Perasi, Allan Kozinn and Adrian Sinclair:

Musicians

- Richard Hewson – conductor
- Vic Flick – guitars
- Herbie Flowers – bass guitar
- Steve Gray – piano
- Clem Cattini – drums
- Jim Lawless – percussion
- Chris Karan – guica
- Members of the Swingle Singers and the Mike Sammes Singers, led by Mike Sammes – backing vocals

Production

- Percy "Thrills" Thrillington – producer
- Richard Hewson – arranger
- Tony Clark – engineer
- Alan Parsons – assistant engineer
- Hipgnosis – artwork
- Jeff Cummings – cover art
- Clint Harrigan – liner notes
- Phil Smee – package design
