= Wingspan: Hits and History =

Greatest hits album by Paul McCartney
- Released: 7 May 2001
- Recorded: 1969–1984
- Genre: Rock
- Length: 153:04 (UK version); 153:06 (US version); 156:22 (Japanese version)
- Label: Parlophone
- Producers: Paul McCartney; Linda McCartney; Chris Thomas; George Martin

Paul McCartney chronology
Liverpool Sound Collage (2000)	Wingspan: Hits and History (2001)	Driving Rain (2001)

Wingspan: Hits and History is the third official compilation album by Paul McCartney, released on 7 May 2001 by Parlophone Records. It primarily includes songs recorded with McCartney's band Wings, but contains also some songs from McCartney's solo career before and after Wings.

== Content ==
Wingspan is separated into two distinct sets: the "Hits" disc features commercially successful material, while "History" showcases lesser-known songs from the same period. The editions of the album vary slightly, the UK edition contains the studio version of "Coming Up", while the US edition contains a live version of the song recorded in Glasgow, as it was more well-known in the US. The Japanese issue of the album also includes "Eat at Home" as the final track, as it was issued as a single in select regions including Japan.

McCartney wanted to include "Give Ireland Back to the Irish" on the compilation, but EMI requested it to be removed, as McCartney said: "EMI rang me up and said, 'Look, you know, we're pretty nervous and you don’t have much time on the album. We should pull [it],'" Remixes of "Silly Love Songs", "Let 'Em In" and "Coming Up" were included on Wingspan.

== Release and reception ==
Professional ratings
Review scores
Source	Rating
AllMusic	4.5/5 stars
The Essential Rock Discography	8/10
The Guardian	4/5 stars
Q	3/5 stars
The Rolling Stone Album Guide	4/5 stars
Uncut	3/5 stars

Released in 2001 in conjunction with a prime time TV documentary, similarly called Wingspan, as well as a book also titled Wingspan, the associated soundtrack was a commercial success. In the United States, it went straight to number 2 on the Billboard 200 with sales of 221,000 copies in the first week of its release. The album charted there for 14 weeks, selling approximately 970,000 units as of 2005. Wingspan has been certified double platinum by the Recording Industry Association of America, and also reached gold status in the UK, Australia and New Zealand. A DVD release of the broadcast documentary – which dealt with McCartney's relationship with Linda Eastman and their eventual marriage, the traumatic final year of the Beatles' career and his own role in their break-up, and the story of Wings' formation and career through the 1970s towards their dissolution in 1980 – was produced by Mary McCartney, who also interviewed her father in the film.

Promotion of the compilation was done, which included a promo CD single featuring remixes of "Silly Love Songs" being issued. Other single releases included a jukebox single of Maybe I'm Amazed and "Band on the Run" was issued, a CD single featuring "Coming Up" and "Silly Love Songs" was issued exclusively in the UK. Capitol released an eight track compilation which featured McCartney introducing each song on it. In the US, a 10 track sampler of Wingspan titled Wingspan Special Advance Sampler. When Wings guitarist Laurence Juber asked McCartney about Wings reuniting to tour to promote the compilation, McCartney told him that he couldn't imagine Wings performing without Linda McCartney, as according to Paul, she was very much part of Wings.

Critical reception was mostly positive, with critics praising how the compilation is sequenced, specifically with the "Hits" and "History" discs. In a review for AllMusic, Stephen Thomas Erlewine called it "ideal", believing the compilation to be perfectly executed with each of its discs. He critiqued the omission of some tracks such as "Ebony and Ivory", McCartney's collaboration with Stevie Wonder, and his collaborations with Michael Jackson. He also questions why it omits tracks such as "Press" and "So Bad" from Press to Play and Pipes of Peace respectively as well as questioning the omission of "Ballroom Dancing" among other album cuts. He does praise the compilation for its approach to "History" filling in the holes left in the "Hits" disc, noting tracks like "Maybe I'm Amazed", "Junk" and "Heart of the Country" as reasoning for being "convincing argument that McCartney's solo recordings are a rich, idiosyncratic body of work of their own merits." In a review for Mojo magazine, Mick Houghton wrote that "Wingspan manages to achieve a remarkable consistency in performance and breadth of songwriting", believing listeners can see what an impressive solo career McCartney achieved, opining that "for the most part these songs genuinely measure up to the standard of The Beatles' McCartney-penned tracks." believing the only reason why Wingspan exists is because McCartney hoped to "put the case for his post-Beatles work no longer being seen as second best." In the Guardian, Adam Sweeting notes that "as this double-disc anthology demonstrates, the Wings years (1971-80) produced an impressive streak of hits: Band on the Run, Jet, Live and Let Die, My Love... and Mull of Kintyre." adding that "Meanwhile, the CDs fit into a grand strategic plan that also includes a two-hour TV documentary tracing the inside story of Wings." Hot Press writer Stephen Robinson believed that songs such as "Listen to What the Man Said", "Band on the Run", "Live and Let Die", "Silly Love Songs" and "Jet" were all excellent tracks, questioning the omission of "Say Say Say", adding of disc two that it "features some classic Wings as well as later works, much of these heavy with the legacy of McCartney’s late wife, Linda, herself an integral part of the outfit, as much for her muse as her musicianship." Billboard wrote it spanned "far and wide across McCartney's genius for lyrical melody", adding that "The 40 tracks have been remastered with loving care by Peter Mew and Geoff Emerick".

== Track listing ==
=== Disc 1: Hits ===
No.	Title	Writer(s)	Performer(s)	Length
1.	"Listen to What the Man Said" (from Venus and Mars, 1975)	P. McCartney, L. McCartney	Wings	3:57
2.	"Band on the Run" (from Band on the Run, 1973)	P. McCartney, L. McCartney	Paul McCartney and Wings	5:13
3.	"Another Day" (Non-album single, 1971)	P. McCartney, L. McCartney	Paul McCartney	3:43
4.	"Live and Let Die" (from the Live and Let Die soundtrack, 1973)	P. McCartney, L. McCartney	Paul McCartney and Wings	3:12
5.	"Jet" (from Band on the Run)	P. McCartney, L. McCartney	Paul McCartney and Wings	4:08
6.	"My Love" (from Red Rose Speedway, 1973)	P. McCartney, L. McCartney	Paul McCartney and Wings	4:08
7.	"Silly Love Songs" (from Wings at the Speed of Sound, 1976)	P. McCartney, L. McCartney	Wings	5:55
8.	"Pipes of Peace" (Single edit; original version from Pipes of Peace, 1983)	P. McCartney	Paul McCartney	3:26
9.	"C Moon" (Non-album single, 1972)	P. McCartney, L. McCartney	Wings	4:35
10.	"Hi, Hi, Hi" (Non-album single, 1972)	P. McCartney, L. McCartney	Wings	3:09
11.	"Let 'Em In" (from Wings at the Speed of Sound)	P. McCartney, L. McCartney	Wings	5:10
12.	"Goodnight Tonight" (Non-album single, 1979)	P. McCartney	Wings	4:21
13.	"Junior's Farm" (DJ edit; non-album single, 1974)	P. McCartney, L. McCartney	Paul McCartney and Wings	3:03
14.	"Mull of Kintyre" (Non-album single, 1977)	P. McCartney, Denny Laine	Wings	4:45
15.	"Uncle Albert/Admiral Halsey" (from Ram, 1971)	P. McCartney, L. McCartney	Paul and Linda McCartney	4:50
16.	"With a Little Luck" (DJ edit; original version from London Town, 1978)	P. McCartney	Wings	3:13
17.	"Coming Up" (from McCartney II, 1980. US edition of the album contains a live recording recorded in Glasgow in its place.)	P. McCartney	Paul McCartney	3:53
18.	"No More Lonely Nights" (from Give My Regards to Broad Street, 1984)	P. McCartney	Paul McCartney	4:47
Total length:				75:38

Japanese edition
No.	Title	Writer(s)	Performer(s)	Length
19.	"Eat at Home"	P. McCartney, L. McCartney	Paul and Linda McCartney	3:22
Total length:				77:57

=== Disc 2: History ===
No.	Title	Writer(s)	Performer(s)	Length
1.	"Let Me Roll It" (from Band on the Run)	P. McCartney, L. McCartney	Paul McCartney and Wings	4:51
2.	"The Lovely Linda" (from McCartney, 1970)	P. McCartney	Paul McCartney	0:45
3.	"Daytime Nighttime Suffering" (B-side to the "Goodnight Tonight" single, 1979)	P. McCartney	Wings	3:23
4.	"Maybe I'm Amazed" (from McCartney)	P. McCartney	Paul McCartney	3:52
5.	"Helen Wheels" (Non-album single/Band on the Run [US edition only], 1973)	P. McCartney, L. McCartney	Paul McCartney and Wings	3:46
6.	"Bluebird" (from Band on the Run)	P. McCartney, L. McCartney	Paul McCartney and Wings	3:26
7.	"Heart of the Country" (from Ram)	P. McCartney, L. McCartney	Paul and Linda McCartney	2:24
8.	"Every Night" (from McCartney)	P. McCartney	Paul McCartney	2:34
9.	"Take It Away" (Single version; original version from Tug of War, 1982)	P. McCartney	Paul McCartney	4:05
10.	"Junk" (from McCartney)	P. McCartney	Paul McCartney	1:57
11.	"Man We Was Lonely" (from McCartney)	P. McCartney	Paul McCartney	2:59
12.	"Venus and Mars/Rock Show" (Single edit; original version from Venus and Mars)	P. McCartney, L. McCartney	Wings	3:46
13.	"The Back Seat of My Car" (from Ram)	P. McCartney	Paul and Linda McCartney	4:29
14.	"Rockestra Theme" (from Back to the Egg, 1979)	P. McCartney	Wings	2:36
15.	"Girlfriend" (from London Town)	P. McCartney	Wings	4:44
16.	"Waterfalls" (DJ edit; original version from McCartney II)	P. McCartney	Paul McCartney	3:24
17.	"Tomorrow" (from Wild Life, 1971)	P. McCartney, L. McCartney	Wings	3:27
18.	"Too Many People" (from Ram)	P. McCartney	Paul and Linda McCartney	4:12
19.	"Call Me Back Again" (from Venus and Mars)	P. McCartney, L. McCartney	Wings	4:59
20.	"Tug of War" (Single version; original version from Tug of War)	P. McCartney	Paul McCartney	4:04
21.	"Bip Bop/Hey Diddle" (Previously unreleased; recorded in 1971)	P. McCartney, L. McCartney	Paul and Linda McCartney	3:36
22.	"No More Lonely Nights" (Playout version) (Edit; original version from Give My Regards to Broad Street)	P. McCartney	Paul McCartney	3:55
Total length:				77:26

== Charts and certifications ==
=== Weekly charts ===
Chart (2001)	Peak position
Australian Albums (ARIA)	14
Austrian Albums (Ö3 Austria)	28
Belgian Albums (Ultratop Flanders)	21
Belgian Albums (Ultratop Wallonia)	27
Canadian Albums (Billboard)	4
Danish Albums (Hitlisten)	18
Dutch Albums (Album Top 100)	32
German Albums (Offizielle Top 100)	20
Italian Albums (FIMI)	18
Japanese Albums (Oricon)	13
New Zealand Albums (RMNZ)	13
Norwegian Albums (VG-lista)	5
Scottish Albums (Official Charts)	5
Swedish Albums (Sverigetopplistan)	49
UK Albums (Official Charts)	5
US Billboard 200	2

=== Year-end charts ===
Chart (2001)	Position
Canadian Albums (Nielsen SoundScan)	86
UK Albums Chart	152
US Billboard Year-End	126

=== Certifications and sales ===
Certifications and sales for Wingspan: Hits and History
Region	Certification	Certified units/sales
Australia (ARIA)	Gold	35,000^{^}
Japan (Oricon Charts)	—	56,000
New Zealand (RMNZ)	Gold	7,500^{^}
United Kingdom (BPI)	Gold	100,000^{^}
United States (RIAA)	2× Platinum	1,000,000^{^}
^{^} Shipments figures based on certification alone.

== See also ==
- Wings Greatest
