= Hey Diddle =

Song by Paul and Linda McCartney
- Recorded: 26 October 1970
- Length: 3:50 (Paul McCartney Archive Collection edition of Ram)
- Label: MPL (Archive Collection)
- Songwriters: Paul McCartney; Linda McCartney
- Producer: Paul McCartney

"Hey Diddle" is a song by the English musical duo Paul and Linda McCartney, recorded on 26 October 1970 during the sessions for the two's collaborative album Ram (1971).

== Background and recording ==
Originally titled "She Can't Be Found", "Hey Diddle" was recorded on 26 October 1970, and consisted of Paul McCartney on an acoustic guitar and a bass (the bass was added during an overdub session), Hugh McCracken on acoustic guitar, Denny Seiwell on a bass drum, with pots and pans acting as the rest of the drum kit, Paul, McCracken, and Seiwell on ocarinas, Linda McCartney was not present for the session according to authors Allan Kozinn and Adrian Sinclair. In 1974, Paul and Linda, alongside their group Wings, decided to finish off the song with the help of Ernie Winfrey, The first overdub session for "Hey Diddle" was on 8 July 1974, where Margie and Marcy Cates added fiddles that were later double-tracked. Another overdub session followed on 10 July, and consisted of the group bringing in Lloyd Green of the Nashville A-Team to add in a pedal steel guitar and Johnny Gimble to add a fiddle. One of the overdubs added on either 8 or 10 July resulted in Paul McCartney using an ashtray as an instrument. Ted Montgomery notes the inclusion of Linda's vocals at some point in recording.

== Release and reception ==
"Hey DIddle" went unreleased until 2001, when it was included as a medley alongside "Bip Bop" on the compilation album Wingspan: Hits and History (2001), supposedly to entice McCartney fans who thought they had heard everything he had released. In 2012, a Dixon Van Winkle mix was released on the Paul McCartney Archive Collection reissue of Ram. In 2014, a new mix by Ernie Winfrey created in 1974 from overdubs of the original 1970 recording was released on the Archive Collection reissue of Venus and Mars (1975). In 2018, a home demo of "Hey Diddle" was included on the Archive Collection reissue of Wild Life (1971). Andrew Wild called it a "lovely acoustic song, perhaps one lightweight track too many amongst some of the other less-than-inspiring songs on Ram." Jayson Greene of Pitchfork wrote "Another Day" and "Hey Diddle" both "feel like a cracked-open door onto the kind of records Paul could have conceivably gone on making forever."

== Credits and personnel ==
Dixon Van Winkle mix

According to authors Ted Montgomery, Chip Madinger, Mark Easter, Allan Kozinn and Adrian Sinclair:

- Paul McCartney – bass, acoustic guitar, ocarina, vocals
- Linda McCartney – vocals
- Hugh McCracken – acoustic guitar, ocarina
- Denny Seiwell – bass drum, pots and pans

Ernie Winfrey mix

According to authors Bill Harry, Madinger, Easter, Kozinn and Sinclair:

- Paul McCartney – acoustic guitar, bass, Irish whistle, vocals, ashtray
- Linda McCartney – vocals
- Lloyd Green – pedal steel guitar
- Johnny Gimble – fiddle
- Margia Cates – fiddle
- Marcy Cates – fiddle
