= Dear Boy =

Dear Boy or Dear Boys may refer to:

== Books ==
- Dear boy : the life of Keith Moon by Tony Fletcher (2005)
- Dear Boy, a collection of poems by Emily Berry
- Dear Boys, a 2003 sports manga by Hiroki Yagami

== Film and TV ==
- "Dear Boy" (Angel), an episode of TV series Angel

== Music ==
- "Dear Boy" (song), a 1971 song by Paul McCartney
- "Dear Boy", a song by Avicii from the 2013 album True
- "Dear Boys", a song by Keisuke Kuwata
- "Dear Boys", a song by Latterman
