= Get on the Right Thing =

Paul McCartney and Wings song released in 1973

Song by Paul McCartney and Wings

from the album Red Rose Speedway
- Released: 30 April 1973
- Recorded: 14 October 1970, 10-11 February 1971
- Studio: CBS Studios and A&R Recording, New York
- Genre: Rock
- Length: 4:17
- Label: Apple
- Songwriters: Paul McCartney, Linda McCartney
- Producer: Paul McCartney

"Get on the Right Thing" is a song written by Paul McCartney and Linda McCartney that was first released on Wings' 1973 album Red Rose Speedway.

== Writing and recording ==
"Get on the Right Thing" was originally recorded for Paul and Linda McCartney's 1971 album Ram. It was written during the summer of 1970 and the music was initially recorded on 14 October 1970 at CBS Studios Studio B in New York. Paul overdubbed the lead vocal on 10 February 1971 at A&R Recording in New York, and Paul and Linda added the backing vocals on 11 February. However, Paul McCartney was dissatisfied with his vocal and felt the song was unfinished and did not want to release it. Wings' guitarist Denny Laine liked it and convinced him to include the song on Red Rose Speedway. According to Laine:

[Paul] never thought [that the song] was finished. He did it in New York during the Ram sessions. He never wanted to use it on anything. He didn't think the lead vocals were any good. He just laid the vocal down at the end of the day and didn't know all of the words. I used to say, "But it's great. I love it. If you change the vocal though, it won't be as strong." And eventually he put it on Red Rose Speedway.

As a Ram outtake that was recorded before Wings was formed, Laine does not perform on "Get on the Right Thing". Nor does Wings' other guitarist from the Red Rose Speedway era, Henry McCullough. Instead, David Spinozza plays electric guitar on the song. Paul McCartney played bass guitar and piano, in additional to providing the lead vocal, Denny Seiwell, who played on Ram before joining Wings, played drums, and Linda McCartney provided the backing vocal.

== Lyrics and music ==
Beatle biographer John Blaney described the lyrics as describing "hippie heaven – oneness with nature, sunshine, the wife and kids, and love, sweet, love.". Music professor Vincent P. Benitez said that the song "conveys a message of discernment and self-awareness in the midst of life" but complained that the images in the lyrics don't match the sophistication of the music. The refrain consists of the song title being repeated in a call and response pattern.

Beatle expert Bruce Spizer described the music as "gospel-flavored. It is in the key of E major. Paul McCartney creates harmonic tension in the music by singing a rising melody against the chords that all contain the note of E. The verses employ a chromatic chord structure. However, the refrain uses a diatonic structure, based on the tonic, dominant and subdominant chords of E, B and A.

== Reception ==
Los Angeles Times critic Robert Hilburn felt that "Get on the Right Thing" was the best song on Red Rose Speedway due to the "steady, snappy background vocal that bites out the title phrase." Valley News critic Ovid Goode Jr. praised it for "excelling as high-tension rock and roll and displaying the tightness of [the] back-up group. Flint Journal staff writer Brian L. Steffens said that the song "with its solid beat, vocal harmony and guitar lines, is so much like earlier work as to be very nearly a letdown for McCartney fans."

Ultimate Classic Rock critic Nick DeRiso rated "Get on the Right Thing" to be Paul McCartney's 21st best song with Wings. Despite McCartney's concerns about his vocal performance, DeRiso praised the performance, stating that "McCartney sings in the style of his old Little Richard send-ups for one of the last times on an original song. His vocals ascend into a rattling fervor, then whoop and call all the way back down..." DeRiso also said that "rocks in a way that drive-by fans might never have guessed" based on the hit single from Red Rose Speedway, "My Love". Beatle biographer Robert Rodriguez felt it was one of the strongest songs on Red Rose Speedway. Chip Madinger and Mark Easter felt that it was "melodic yet overlong." Blaney said that "we've heard it all before and better." Music journalist Andrew Wild described it as being in "classic Wings territory", particularly praising the lead vocal that "gradually gets more and more unhinged."

"Get on the Right Thing" was included on the Wings compilation album Wings.

== Personnel ==
According to the author Luca Perasi:

Musicians

- Paul McCartney – vocals, backing vocals, bass guitar, piano, electric guitar
- Linda McCartney – backing vocals
- David Spinozza – electric guitar
- Denny Seiwell – drums

Technical

- Paul McCartney – producer
- Tim Geelan – engineer
