= The McCartney Legacy =

Book series by Allan Kozinn and Adrian Sinclair

- Author: Allan Kozinn, Adrian Sinclair
- Subject: Paul McCartney
- Genre: Biography
- Publisher: HarperCollins
- Publication date: 13 December 2022 (Volume 1), 10 December 2024 (Volume 2)
- Media type: Print
- Pages: 720
- ISBN: 978-0-063-00072-8
- Website: www.mccartneylegacy.com

The McCartney Legacy is a biographical book series about the post-Beatles musical career of Paul McCartney, written by music journalist Allan Kozinn and documentarian and writer Adrian Sinclair. Volume 1 of the series, covering the years 1969–1973, was released on 13 December 2022. A second volume, covering 1974–1980, was released on 10 December 2024. The project was influenced, in part, and inspired by the work of Beatles historian Mark Lewisohn, author of The Beatles: All These Years series. McCartney did not participate in the project but did not discourage others from giving interviews, such as former Wings drummer Denny Seiwell and filmmaker Sir Michael Lindsay-Hogg.

Volume 1 was received favorably in The New York Times as a "well-planned encore" to McCartney's 2021 semi-autobiographical work, The Lyrics: 1956 to the Present. The book was also heralded by the British music press, receiving 5/5 from Record Collector magazine's Jamie Atkins, 9/10 from Uncut magazine's Jim Wirth, 8/10 from Classic Rock magazine's Hugh Fielder, and 4/5 from Mojo magazine's Tom Doyle. Music scholar Kenneth Womack praised it as "a triumph. Masterful in scope and full of rich detail." In The Times, Daniel Finkelstein gave a mixed review, complaining that it was too long and was a substandard "imitator" of Lewisohn's work, while praising the depth of research. The Irish Times gave a mixed review, offering that the book was "often compelling", but also "so exhaustive it's almost like swimming through treacle to get to something that little bit more interesting". Rolling Stone writer Rob Sheffield described the book as a "comprehensive, painstaking, dazzling and definitive chronicle." Lewisohn praised the book as an "accurate biography of a universal explorer."

Off the back of the publication of Volume 1, Sinclair was hired as Archive Consultant for Morgan Neville's 2026 documentary Man on the Run. Neville described Kozinn and Sinclair's book as "the blueprint" for his film, which explores the post-Beatles rebirth of Paul McCartney.
