= Too Many People =

Single by Paul & Linda McCartney

from the album Ram
- A-side: "Uncle Albert/Admiral Halsey"
- Released: 2 August 1971
- Recorded: 10 November 1970 – 18 March 1971
- Studio: Columbia Studio B and A&R, New York City; Sunset Sound Recorders Studio, Los Angeles
- Genre: Rock
- Length: 4:10
- Label: Apple
- Songwriter: Paul McCartney
- Producers: Paul and Linda McCartney

Paul & Linda McCartney singles chronology
| "Another Day" (1971) | "Uncle Albert/Admiral Halsey" / "Too Many People" (1971) | "The Back Seat of My Car" (1971) |

"Too Many People" is a song by Paul McCartney and his wife Linda McCartney from their 1971 album Ram. The song was issued as the B-side of the "Uncle Albert/Admiral Halsey" single. It is typically regarded as McCartney's response to his former Beatles bandmate John Lennon's contentious Rolling Stone interview (1970), in which he lambasted the Beatles' work and McCartney's character. The lines "Too many people preaching practices" and "You took your lucky break and broke it in two", as well the opening utterance "Piss off, cake", are the most pronounced attacks on Lennon and his wife Yoko Ono, and McCartney admitted that they were digs. However, he dismissed their significance—one time calling them "harmless", "little digs"—and insisted that nothing else on Ram referred to the couple. Some critics have ranked "Too Many People" as one of McCartney's best songs and drawn comparisons between it and the Beatles' work. McCartney released an instrumental version on Thrillington (1977).

Lennon took the digs in the song, and some other things on Ram which he thought were attacks, very personally. In September 1971, he released his own answer song "How Do You Sleep?". On some occasions, he described it as his answer to Ram, and other times, he explained that it was just a mood of his and that there was never a serious feud between him and McCartney. The pair had reconciled by the time of Lennon's death in 1980.

== Background ==
After the Beatles broke up, John Lennon and Paul McCartney's relationship soured. The latter released a series of questions-and-answers on 9 April 1970 in which he said he would break from the Beatles for at least some time, and the tabloid Daily Mirror spun the statement into the headline "PAUL IS QUITTING THE BEATLES" the next day. Lennon was livid; he wanted to announce the band's split first. Strains and ruptures also turned up among the rest of the group: George Harrison scolded McCartney in "Wah-Wah" (1970), McCartney forced his bandmates into a lawsuit to formally dissolve the group, and Lennon called the Beatles "the biggest bastards on Earth". For some months, Lennon and McCartney mostly communicated through comments on newspapers or their songs.

According to author Peter Ames Carlin, Lennon's resentment against McCartney spilled out in his controversial, fiery Rolling Stone interview (1970) with Jann Wenner; Lennon had recently undergone primal therapy. There, he tore apart the public image of the Beatles and the Lennon–McCartney songwriting partnership, ranting frankly against much of his Beatles songs, many of the people in the group's orbit, and the band's resistance to having his wife Yoko Ono in the studio. He presented McCartney as a conceited control freak and falsely stated that they had stopped writing songs together in 1962. Out of the two songwrtiters, Lennon identifies himself as the artist and truth-teller and McCartney as a commercially focused tunesmith. He also dubbed his bandmate's self-named 1970 album "rubbish".

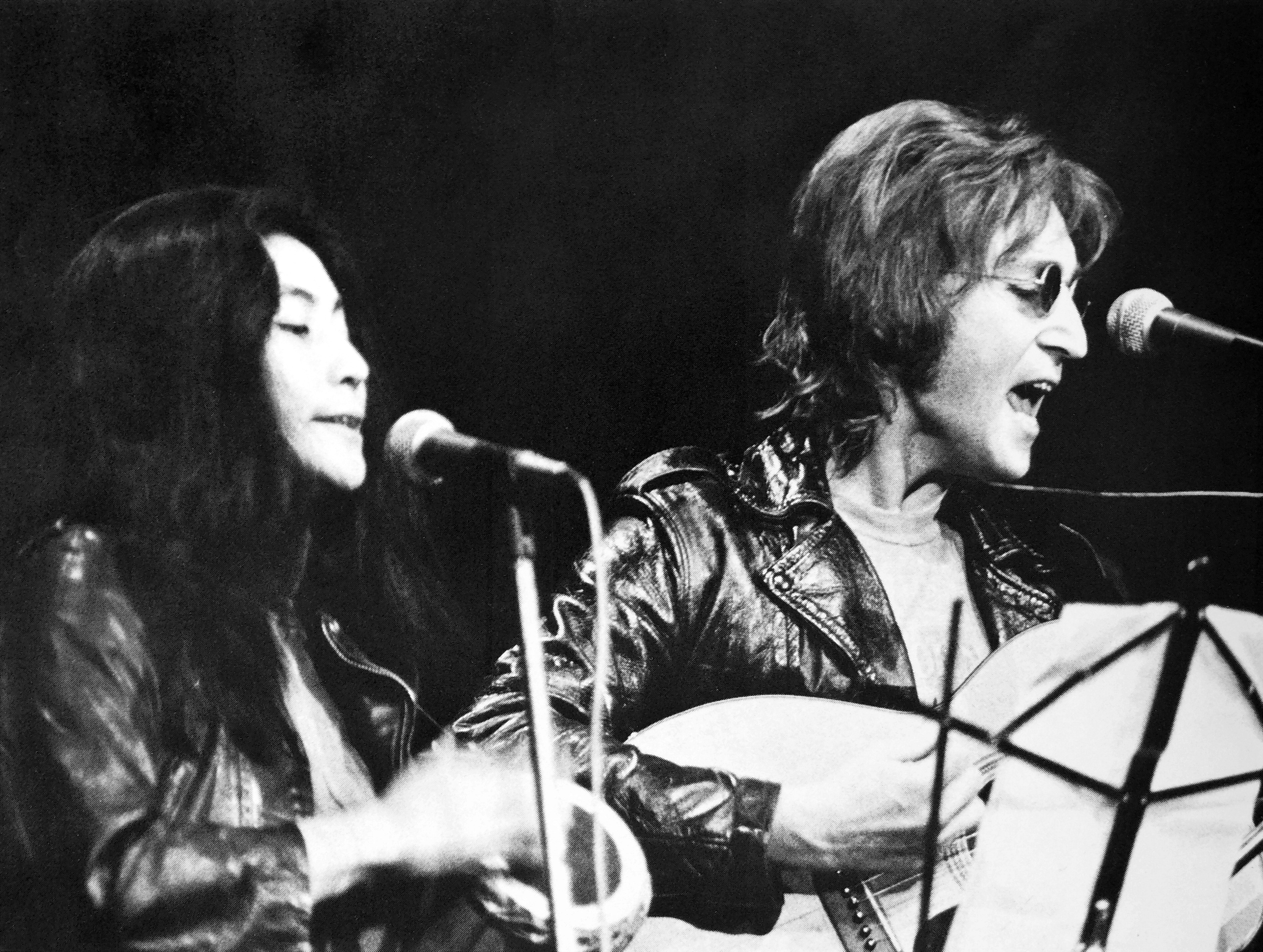
Yoko Ono and John Lennon in 1971

In his 1973 Rolling Stone interview, McCartney admitted he had been devastated by Lennon's statements about him. He recalled: "I sat down and pored over every little paragraph, every sentence ... And at the time I thought. 'It's me ... That's just what I'm like. He's captured me so well; I'm a turd." (Note: In a 1987 Rolling Stone interview, McCartney said that he still went "over this ground in my mind" and that, at the time, Lennon's comments about him were "very hurtful".) McCartney responded by composing "Too Many People", whose lines "Too many people preaching practices" and "You took your lucky break and broke it in two" address his erstwhile bandmate. Author John Blaney remarks that "Too Many People" shows McCartney "at his most acerbic", and that he was "attempting to reveal his innermost feelings while at the same time concealing them in metaphors and encrypted symbolism". According to critic Michael Gallucci, it is "McCartney's bitchiest kissoff to his ex-bandmates".

On the "preaching practices" comment, McCartney said that he had grown bothered of Lennon and Ono's activism and responded with a small dig. In a 2001 interview with Mojo magazine, he echoed this thought: "I felt we didn't need to be told what to do. The whole tenor of the Beatles thing had been, like, to each his own. Freedom. Suddenly it was 'You should do this'. It was just a bit the wagging finger, and I was pissed off with it." The "lucky break" line was originally "Yoko took your lucky break and broke it in two", though McCartney revised it before recording the song. Still, Gallucci interprets it as a jab at Lennon's relationship with Ono. The song begins with the line "Piss off, cake", on which McCartney later stated in the Mojo interview: "Like, a piece of cake becomes piss off cake. And it's nothing, it's so harmless really, just little digs."

McCartney recalled in an interview with Playboy in 1984:

I was looking at my second solo album, Ram, the other day and I remember there was one tiny little reference to John in the whole thing. He'd been doing a lot of preaching, and it got up my nose a little bit. In one song, I wrote, 'Too many people preaching practices', I think is the line. I mean, that was a little dig at John and Yoko. There wasn't anything else on it that was about them. Oh, there was 'You took your lucky break and broke it in two'.

He denied there being any other attacks on the Ram (1971) album such as in "3 Legs".

== Composition ==
The introduction to the song, as well as the bridge, alternates the tonic chord of G major with its minor subdominant chord of C minor. This allows McCartney to go from the bridge to a repetition of the introduction music as a means of moving the music back to the verses. According to Vincent Perez Benitez, this strategy "enhance[s] the coherence of the song" in a manner consistent with McCartney's earlier song "Maybe I'm Amazed". "Too Many People" incorporates guitar solos in both the middle and at the end of the song. The bridge is in the key of A minor.

Rolling Stone remarked that "Too Many People"'s "incredibly sweet melody is proof that McCartney could use his charm as a weapon when he wanted to".

== Recording ==
The basic track for "Too Many People" was recorded on 10 November 1970 in Columbia Studios in New York City. The musicians were Paul McCartney on acoustic guitar, Hugh McCracken on electric guitar, and Denny Seiwell on drums. Paul did not explain the song's lyrics to McCracken or Seiwell when he played it for them. Seiwell stated: "Our headspace was that we were in there trying to do the best job. ... So we stayed away from all that crap. Paul never brought it into the studio either. We respected him and he respected our professionalism—it was better left unsaid." After recording the basic track, McCartney and Seiwell added percussion, including shaker and cowbell, after which McCartney recorded the two solos in the bridge in one take.

Overdub sessions for Ram took place in January 1971 at A&R Studios in New York City. On 28 January, McCartney overdubbed brass players to "Too Many People", specifically the song's opening and before the two appearances of the lyrics "you took your lucky break". Paul and his wife Linda McCartney's vocals for the song were recorded on 10 February, with Paul triple-tracking his lead vocal. Additional backing vocals by the McCartneys and percussion noises using a wooden pallet by Paul were added on 18 March, this time at Sunset Sound Recorders Studio in Los Angeles. Engineer Eirk Wangberg remembered Paul asking him to set up a microphone on the pallet: "Then he hopped onto [it] and started jumping on each quarter [note]. What a sound it gave on tape!" Mixing for the Ram songs took place during April.

== Releases ==
"Too Many People" was released as the first song on Ram on 17 May 1971 in the United States (and 21 May in the United Kingdom), and later as the B-side to "Uncle Albert/Admiral Halsey" on 2 August 1971. An instrumental cover version of "Too Many People" was released on the album Thrillington in 1977. Recorded in June 1971 by Paul, this recording prominently features horns and opens with studio chatter from the orchestra members, similar to the opening for the Beatles' "Sgt. Pepper's Lonely Hearts Club Band" (1967). In this version, a stereo phaser was used to produce a sound that music journalist Ian Peel describes as coming from a "psychedelic echo chamber". Of the Thrillington version, Peel states that "rock 'n' roll is transformed into funky jazz with more than a hint of studio experimentation". The Ram recording was later released on the compilation albums Wingspan: Hits and History (2001) and Pure McCartney (2016). A mono version was released on the Paul McCartney Archive Collection reissue of Ram in 2012, as well as The 7" Singles Box in 2022.

== Critical reception ==
Rolling Stone rated "Too Many People" to be McCartney's third greatest post-Beatles song, two slots ahead of its A-side "Uncle Albert/Admiral Halsey" and behind only "Band on the Run" and "Maybe I'm Amazed". Billboard described "Too Many People" as "wailing sentimentality." Capital Journal critic Steve Gettinger called "Too Many People" a high point of Ram stating that it is "bright and bitter, carefully constructed" and "unmistakably Beatles." Boston Globe critic Ernie Santosuosso described it as "a loud meditation about society" with a "particularly violent guitar statement," praising the music more than the lyrics.

Los Angeles Times critic Robert Hilburn described "Too Many People" as "a sort of musical extension of Thomas Malthus that includes some of the humorous irony of the vintage Beatles," with lines such as "Too many reaching for a piece of cake" and "Too many hungry people losing weight." Hilburn goes on to state that the song provides a lyrical surprise, which he likens to an O. Henry story, in which the lyrics turn to "a statement about the resolution of ones problems in a difficult self-centered world." Hilburn suggests that this may be a reference to McCartney's experience with the Beatles' breakup.

According to Ultimate Classic Rock critic Nick DeRiso, the song's "haughty sermonizing" towards Lennon is one of the weaknesses of the Ram album, though fellow Ultimate Classic Rock critic Gallucci rated the song as the fourth best Beatles' post-breakup fight song and Ultimate Classic Rock critic Brian Wawzenek rated it as the fourth best song inspired by Yoko Ono.

== Aftermath ==
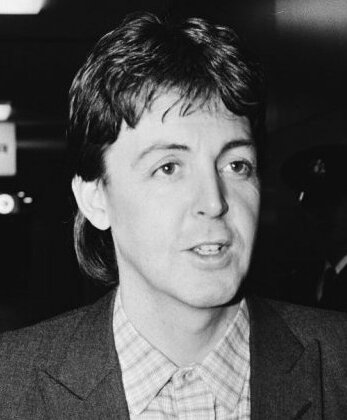
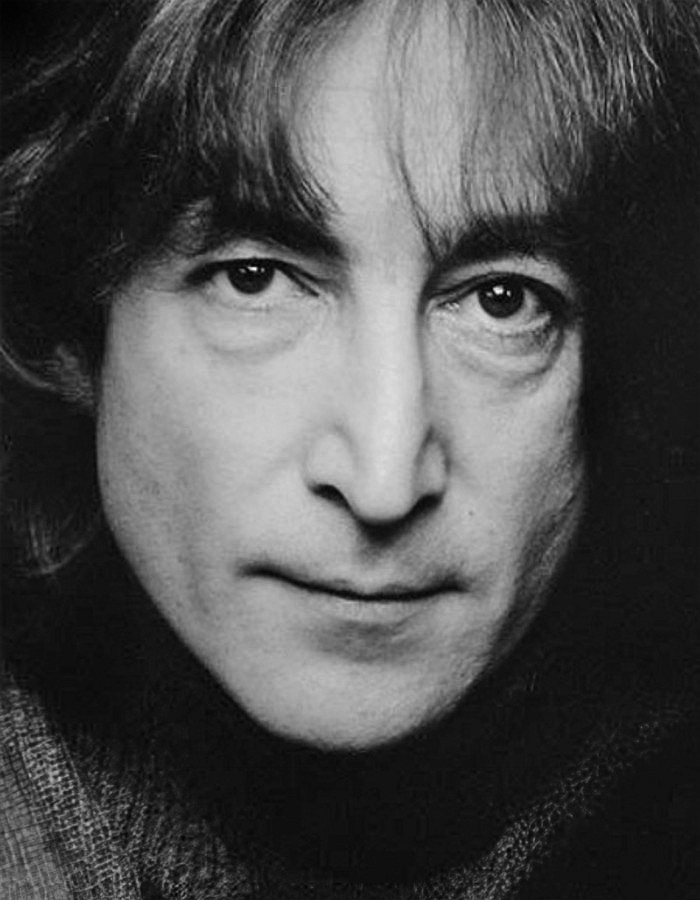
Paul McCartney and John Lennon pictured in 1980, the year of Lennon's death

Following the song's release on Ram in May 1971, Lennon felt attacked and found several apparent cases of McCartney insulting him. He interpreted the image of two beetles seemingly copulating—"getting screwed"—on the album cover and the record's opening words, "Piss off", as references to the two's relationship. He thought other Ram songs such as "3 Legs" boasted similar jabs, even though McCartney denied this. In Linda's words: "They thought the whole album was about them. And then they got very upset." Lennon addressed the attacks with "How Do You Sleep?" from his September 1971 release Imagine. The song featured a prominent slide guitar part played by George Harrison. However, Lennon has claimed sparse and varied motives for writing it. Shortly before his death, Lennon told Playboy magazine:

Well, it was like Dylan doing 'Like a Rolling Stone,' one of his nasty songs. It's using somebody as an object to create something. I wasn't really feeling that vicious at the time, but I was using my resentment towards Paul to create a song. Let's put it that way. It was just a mood.

Around the same period, he admitted: "I don't really go round with those thoughts in my head all the time." In his view, McCartney's subtle insults on his album were hidden enough to be missed by the public, but he spot them nonetheless and thought: "Well, hang up being obscure! I'll just get right down to the nitty-gritty." On the other hand, Lennon explained in the 1972 film Imagine that the song was about himself and laments that its meaning had become tied with McCartney. He suggested in 1971 that there was never a feud between him and his partner, and that it was "all good, clean fun".

While saying at the time that "How Do You Sleep?" was "silly ... [He] says the only thing I did was 'Yesterday', and he knows that's wrong", McCartney admitted to liking Imagine. He remembered in his 2025 book on Wings that after hearing "How Do You Sleep?", he almost wrote a song called "Quite Well, Thank You". He discarded it since he did not care for writing an answer song. Following their writing songs against each other throughout the year and Lennon's Rolling Stone interview, McCartney wrote "Dear Friend" as a way to reconcile with Lennon. Over the next few years until 1976, the relationship slowly improved, until a fateful meeting at Lennon's apartment upset it. But by the end of 1980, cordial relations had again been restored between the pair.

== Personnel ==
According to Luca Perasi:

- Paul McCartney – lead and backing vocals, acoustic and electric guitar, bass guitar
- Linda McCartney – backing vocals
- Hugh McCracken – acoustic and electric guitar
- Denny Seiwell – drums, percussion, shaker, cowbell
- Unknown musicians – horns
