= Monkberry Moon Delight =

Song by Paul and Linda McCartney

Song by Paul and Linda McCartney

from the album Ram
- Released: 17 May 1971
- Recorded: November–December 1970
- Genre: Hard rock
- Length: 5:21
- Label: Apple
- Songwriters: Paul McCartney, Linda McCartney
- Producers: Paul McCartney, Linda McCartney

"Monkberry Moon Delight" is a song by Paul and Linda McCartney, from their 1971 album Ram.

== Composition and arrangement ==
"Monkberry Moon Delight" is in the key of C minor. McCartney's vocals are accompanied by a chord progression consisting of Cm, Gm7, and G7 chords (i–v7–V7). In the chorus, which features Linda in a more active role on vocals, her and McCartney's singing is supported by Cm and Fm chords. This leads to an A♭7–G7–Cm harmonic succession, with the A♭7 functioning as an augmented sixth chord (Ger+^{6}). McCartney's gruff, distinctive vocalization was influenced by Screamin' Jay Hawkins, who later covered the song.

== Lyrics ==
McCartney said of the song's title, which also appears in the lyrics:

When my kids were young they used to call milk "monk" for whatever reason that kids do—I think it's magical the way that kids can develop better names for things than the real ones. In fact, as a joke, Linda and I still occasionally refer to an object by that child-language name. So, monk was always milk, and monkberry moon delight was a fantasy drink, rather like "Love Potion No. 9", hence the line in the song, "sipping monkberry moon delight". It was a fantasy milk shake.

== Reception ==
Upon Ram's release, Anthony Boot of The Kingston Whig-Standard referred to "Monkberry Moon Delight" as "a bit of a waste" on what he considered to otherwise be "an excellent album".

In 2020, Rolling Stone ranked "Monkberry Moon Delight" number 22 on their ranking of the 40 greatest McCartney songs from his solo career; the list's compilers refer to the song as one of McCartney's "genius obscurities".

Ultimate Classic Rock critic Dave Swanson rated "Monkberry Moon Delight" as McCartney's most underrated song, saying that it "features one of his rawest vocals tracks ever" and a "stomping rhythm and whimsical backup vocals".

== Personnel ==
- Paul McCartney – lead vocals, bass, piano
- Linda McCartney – backing vocals
- David Spinozza or Hugh McCracken – guitar
- Denny Seiwell – drums
- Heather McCartney – backing vocals

== Cover versions ==
In 1972, Bahamian musician Exuma recorded a cover of "Monkberry Moon Delight", which was included on his album Reincarnation. The following year, Screamin' Jay Hawkins recorded a cover of the song and released it as a single. The American band Robbers on High Street released a version on their 2006 EP "The Fatalist and Friends."
