= Heart of the Country =

Single by Paul and Linda McCartney

from the album Ram
- A-side: "The Back Seat of My Car"
- Released: 13 August 1971
- Recorded: 16 November 1970
- Studio: CBS Studios, New York City; Sunset Sound Recorders Studio, Los Angeles
- Genre: Folk rock, country folk
- Length: 2:21
- Label: Apple
- Songwriters: Paul and Linda McCartney
- Producers: Paul and Linda McCartney

Paul and Linda McCartney singles chronology
"Uncle Albert/Admiral Halsey" (1971)	"The Back Seat of My Car" / "Heart of the Country" (1971)	"Eat at Home" (1971)

Music video
- "Heart of the Country" on YouTube

"Heart of the Country" is a song written by Paul and Linda McCartney from their album Ram released in 1971.

== Composition ==
The song is about a man searching for a farm in the middle of nowhere, it reflects Paul's heading for the Scottish countryside to escape the headaches associated with the Beatles' break-up at the time. The song is played in the key of D Minor at a tempo of 173.

== Personnel ==
- Paul McCartney – lead vocals, bass guitar, guitar
- Linda McCartney – backing vocals
- Hugh McCracken – guitar
- Denny Seiwell – drums (with brushes)

== Reception ==
In a contemporary review for Ram, Jon Landau of Rolling Stone gave "Heart of the Country" a negative review, calling it the album's "lowest point", and the song that "most clearly indicates [Ram's] failures". Landau described the song as "an evenly paced, finger-picking styled tune, with very light jazz overtones, obviously intended as Paul's idea of "mellow."". However, Landau believed McCartney's lyrics about the country "ring false".

Stephen Thomas Erlewine of AllMusic described the song as "an effortless folk-pop tune that ranks among [McCartney's] very best songs". Erlewine also praises its "imaginative and gorgeous arrangement". In 2013, Rolling Stone rated "Heart of the Country" at number 26 in its list of Paul McCartney's best post-Beatles songs. Ultimate Classic Rock critic Nick DeRiso rated it as McCartney's 40th best song from the 1970s.

== Aftermath ==
McCartney and Elvis Costello re-recorded the song, with Mark Ronson producing, in 2013 for a commercial featuring his late wife Linda's vegetarian recipe book.

It was also included on The 7" Singles Box in 2022.
