= Ram (album) =

Studio album by Paul and Linda McCartney
- Released: 17 May 1971
- Recorded: 12 October 1970 – 9 April 1971
- Studios: Columbia and A&R (New York City); Sound Recorders (Los Angeles)
- Genres: Rock; pop
- Length: 43:15
- Label: Apple
- Producers: Paul McCartney; Linda McCartney

Paul McCartney chronology
McCartney (1970)	Ram (1971)	Thrillington (1977)

Linda McCartney chronology
Ram (1971)	Wide Prairie (1998)

Singles from Ram
- 1. "Uncle Albert/Admiral Halsey" / "Too Many People" Released: 2 August 1971 (US); 2. "The Back Seat of My Car" / "Heart of the Country" Released: 13 August 1971 (UK); 3. "Eat at Home" / "Smile Away" Released: 1971 (Europe only, except UK)

Ram (also stylised in all caps) is the only studio album credited to the spousal music duo Paul and Linda McCartney, and the former's second solo album after leaving the Beatles. Released in May 1971 through Apple Records, it was recorded between October 1970 and April 1971 in New York City and Los Angeles with guitarists David Spinozza and Hugh McCracken and future Wings drummer Denny Seiwell. Paul included Linda in the project because she helped him get through a difficult period following the Beatles' break-up. The recording sessions yielded over 20 songs, including the non-album single "Another Day" / "Oh Woman, Oh Why", released in February 1971.

The album's creation coincided with a period of acrimony between McCartney and the other former Beatles, including his legal action in the United Kingdom's High Court of Justice to dissolve the Beatles partnership. His feelings at the time were reflected in the album's lyrics, which included digs at John Lennon in "Too Many People" (which he responded to with "How Do You Sleep?"), while others centre on the McCartneys' relationship and life in rural Scotland. Ram features an eclectic mix of styles, including 1950s rock and roll, blues, country, jazz and folk. The album's title evokes the idea of pushing forward in the face of negativity.

Ram was a commercial success, topping the album charts in the UK, the Netherlands and Canada, reaching number two in the US, and eventually selling over three million copies. It was promoted with three singles: "Uncle Albert/Admiral Halsey" (McCartney's first solo number one hit in America), "The Back Seat of My Car" and "Eat at Home", as well as promotional clips for "3 Legs" and "Heart of the Country". Despite its commercial success, Ram received negative reviews from music critics, many of whom felt the album lacked substance and found it worse than the other Beatles' concurrent works. The reviews hurt McCartney, as he believed he had responded to criticism of his debut album McCartney (1970). Shortly after its release, McCartney produced Thrillington, an instrumental interpretation of Ram released in 1977 under the pseudonym Percy "Thrills" Thrillington.

In later decades, Ram's critical reception has grown substantially, and it is now viewed as one of McCartney's best albums. Receiving praise for its honesty and cohesion, several modern critics argue that the qualities it was faulted for at first became part of its charm and appeal. It has also been described as an early indie pop record. Numerous artists have paid tribute to the album, including with full track-by-track covers. In 2012, Ram was reissued with over two dozen bonus tracks (and Thrillington) as part of the Paul McCartney Archive Collection. In 2023, Ram was ranked number 450 on Rolling Stone's list of the 500 Greatest Albums of All Time.

== Background ==
Following the break-up of the Beatles and the release of his first solo album McCartney (1970), Paul McCartney wanted to try something new for his next project. While McCartney is a minimalist record featuring him on every instrument, he was now thinking more ambitiously, wanting superb session players and the best studios. In the 2025 book Wings: The Story of a Band on the Run, he describes Ram as a response to his first album's reception: "... it didn't do well with critics; some of those reviews were pretty vicious. So I thought, 'Okay – I'll do the opposite next time, then!' So Ram was done with the top people in the top studio." Having written at least 30 songs during the summer of 1970, McCartney and his family travelled by boat from London to New York City in October to begin auditions for musicians; they were gathered under the guise of recording a commercial jingle.

Auditions began on 9 October 1970 in the basement of an old apartment building on Manhattan's 43rd Street. At first, McCartney decided that an eclectic mix of auditioning drummers would handle the variety of styles in his new songs, so he hired three, one for each week of sessions: Denny Seiwell, Donald MacDonald and Herbie Lovelle; days later, McCartney changed his mind and hired Seiwell for all the sessions. (Note: Seiwell later became the drummer of the McCartneys' new band, Wings.) The next day, auditions moved to a loft on 45th Street. Multiple guitarists auditioned before David Spinozza was hired by Paul's wife Linda McCartney. Other musicians who auditioned included drummer Allan Schwartzberg and guitarist David Bromberg. To make up for the high cost of the session players, Paul decided to record all the backing tracks first, overdubbing bass, extra guitar and vocals later.

== Recording ==
=== Columbia sessions ===
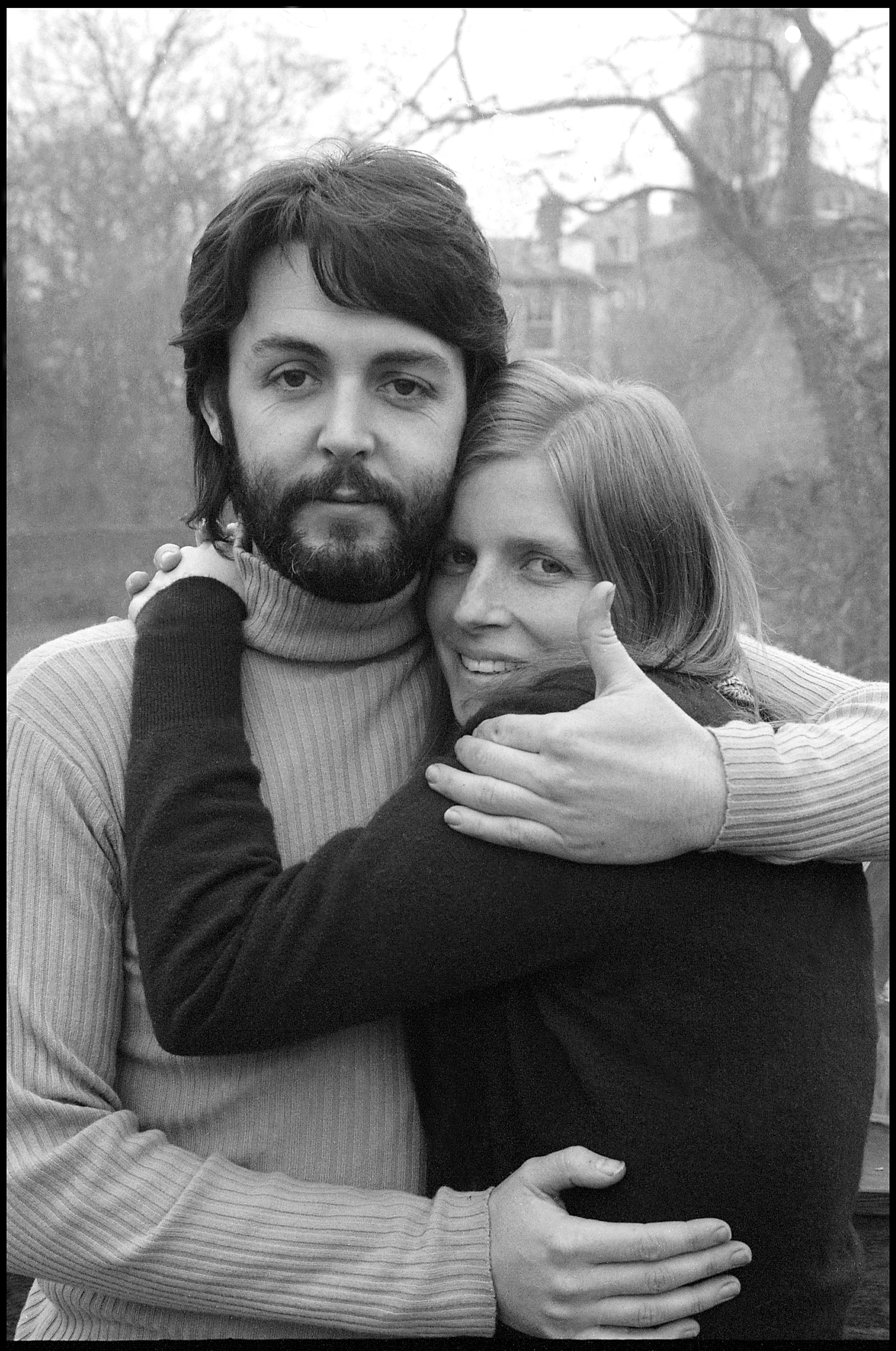
Paul and Linda McCartney in 1969

The sessions for Ram commenced at Columbia's Studio B, New York City, on 12 October 1970 and ran until 19 November. McCartney produced the sessions himself, (Note: The album's production is credited to Paul and Linda.) and Tim Geelan engineering them with Ted Brosnan's help. They generally followed a pattern: Paul played each song for the others, which they rehearsed for hours to achieve a cohesive feel, and then recorded them. They worked from 9 a.m. to 5 p.m., recording the basic track before lunch, then recording another take or overdub parts if need be. Spinozza and Seiwell recalled Paul being "very serious" about the music and refusing to discuss his past or hang out. The former said: "We were professional studio musicians who were there to do a job. We didn't ask him about things." According to Spinozza, Linda did not contribute anything to the songs during his time there. Ten of the final album's 12 songs were recorded at Columbia, beginning with "Another Day". Over the next week, Paul, Spinozza and Seiwell recorded "Get on the Right Thing", "3 Legs" and "Eat at Home" (the last under the working title "Come on Little Lady").

The second week of sessions began with the recording of "I Lie Around" and "When the Wind Is Blowing". These were the last sessions with Spinozza, who left after Paul cancelled multiple recording days and because the latter would not follow a definitive schedule. He began taking other jobs, much to Linda's dismay. Spinozza also found the presence of Linda and Paul's children in the studio distracting and believed that with Paul's having great control over the sessions, he himself would give little. He said in a 1971 interview:

I think the whole album was done in the same form as the McCartney album, only we played the parts for him. ... [T]here was no freedom. We were told exactly what to play; he knew what he wanted and he just used us to do it. ... I would say [we made suggestions] that two out of ten times, he took one of [them] ... modified it and made it into a Paul McCartney-sounding thing. It always came out Paul McCartney.

After Spinozza departed, guitarist Hugh McCracken was hired at Seiwell's suggestion. (Note: No songs feature both Spinozza and McCracken on guitar.) McCracken was a session guitarist whose credits up to that point included works with Van Morrison, Gordon Lightfoot and B. B. King. After his hiring, the group recorded "Rode All Night" and "The Back Seat of My Car", a song that dated back to McCartney's Beatles days. (Note: An early version had premiered during the Beatles' Get Back/Let It Be sessions in January 1969.) Due to its complicated structure, the song needed a lot of work to be perfected. Seiwell told the author Luca Perasi: "That song took a little longer than any other because of all the movements, and the reprise coda ... We celebrated when we got the good take!"

The final week of October saw the recording of "Hey Diddle", "A Love for You", "Long Haired Lady" (under the working title "Love Is Long") and "Sunshine Sometime". Following a break for Halloween, the sessions resumed in the first week of November; McCartney and his group recorded "Monkberry Moon Delight", the newly written "Oh Woman, Oh Why" and "Uncle Albert/Admiral Halsey", a song sliced into five movements. McCracken remembered: "That song represented a breakthrough in [Paul and I's] musical relationship. ... [H]e didn't know what he wanted the guitar part to be like, [so] I asked him to trust me – and he did. ... For the rest of the record, Paul let me try things out before making any suggestions." Seiwell also recalled Paul giving him specific ideas for a drum part for "Uncle Albert/Admiral Halsey"; until now, Seiwell had been forging his own parts. The second week of November saw the recording of "Too Many People" and "Little Woman Love", while in the final week, the group worked on "Heart of the Country", "Smile Away" and "Little Lamb Dragonfly". As the backing track sessions concluded, McCartney held a small wrap party for everyone involved.

Additional vocal overdub sessions occurred from 6 to 11 December 1970 at Columbia's Studio D, with Larry Keyes engineering. The tracks overdubbed were "Monkberry Moon Delight", "Uncle Albert", "Oh Woman, Oh Why", "3 Legs", "Long Haired Lady" and "The Back Seat of My Car". The studio was smaller than Studio B but captured the vocal sound McCartney intended. For "Monkberry Moon Delight", he reportedly sang 90 takes to achieve the raspy sound he wanted. The McCartneys returned to their Scottish farm for the Christmas holidays.

=== A&R sessions ===
The McCartneys returned to New York City at the start of 1971 to continue recording Ram, which commenced at A&R Recording the second week of January and concluded in February. Paul produced the sessions, with Dixon Van Winkle engineering. The studio's cofounder Phil Ramone remembered McCartney: "He was very confident of what he was doing. There wasn't any tentativeness to him or anything like that. ... If something didn't sound right, you had to express your feelings. You might have been putting your head on the chopping block, but it was better than not speaking up."

She was the one that got Paul off of his ass when he was having to sue the other Beatles. His heart was broken. He would've sat up there in Scotland and just become a drunk. She said, 'Come on, you're a songwriter. Let's go to New York and make a record.' If she hadn't got on his case, Ram never would've been made.

— Denny Seiwell on Linda's contribution to Ram, 2026

Inspired by the complex vocal harmonies of the Beatles and Brian Wilson of the Beach Boys, Paul mapped out vocal harmonies for himself and Linda. Linda had little experience singing and had to be taught by Paul. Van Winkle remembered Paul being "very patient" with her and assisting her with her singing. Paul compared her singing to the 1960s girl group the Shangri-Las. He said: "What I liked about Linda's singing was the tone of her voice. I'd never worked singing with a woman before, all my harmonies to that date had been with males, so I liked this idea of her range. But she wasn't a professional singer by any means. I put my part on and then encouraged Linda to just take it easy, relax, [and] put a good performance in, which she did." Linda's vocal duties mostly involved singing harmonies and backing Paul, who sang almost all the lead parts. Linda sang co-lead on "Long Haired Lady". The McCartneys' daughter Heather, whom Paul had adopted the previous year, sang backing vocals on "Monkberry Moon Delight". (Note: One of Heather's drawings inspired "3 Legs".)

The last week of January 1971 and the first week of February saw the recording of orchestral overdubs for "Uncle Albert/Admiral Halsey", "The Back Seat of My Car", "Too Many People" and "Long Haired Lady", arranged by the Beatles' former producer George Martin, marking his and Paul's first collaboration since the Beatles' Abbey Road (1969). The orchestra players were a group of New York-based freelancers, including past and present members of the New York Philharmonic. (Note: Some sources attribute the orchestra to the New York Philharmonic. According to Allan Kozinn and Adrian Sinclair, this is due to inaccurate press reports.) Paul McCartney conducted them himself. Additional overdubs were made to "Oh Woman, Oh Why", "Smile Away", "I Lie Around", "Too Many People" and "Get on the Right Thing". In the middle of February, "Another Day", backed by "Oh Woman, Oh Why", was released as Paul's debut solo single. After its release, Paul spent the third week of February (and his final week at A&R) recording new songs, including "Ram On", "Now Hear This Song of Mine" and "The Great Cock and Seagull Race" (under the working title "Blues").

=== Sound Recorders sessions ===
At the end of February 1971, the McCartneys moved from New York to Los Angeles, where they finished work on Ram at Armin Steiner's Sound Recorders Studio. Paul found his progress on the album was slowing down so he believed a relocation would boost his morale. These sessions were initially produced by Jim Guercio, a friend of the McCartneys; Steiner acted as engineer. During the week, Paul recorded a new song, "Dear Boy", and various overdubs. The following week, McCartney flew Seiwell out to Los Angeles to perform drum overdubs on "Dear Boy". However, progress with Guercio stalled as McCartney did not follow his direction. He was also unable to choose a final tracklist, having recorded over 20 songs. Guercio, who had cancelled his honeymoon to oversee the project, grew fed up and left to honour a previous booking.

Following Guercio's departure, Paul returned as producer and Steiner was replaced by Norwegian engineer Eirik Wangberg. Throughout mid-March, the two added various overdubs, including a new lead vocal for "3 Legs". Due to an previously unknown tape splice, they decided to split "Ram On" into two tracks, separated by a fade-out and a fade-in. From late March into early April, the two finished up overdubs on multiple songs, including "Eat at Home" and "Long Haired Lady"; the final overdub session occurred on 9 April. After six months of recording, costs for Ram amounted to an estimated £62,000 (equivalent to £783,609 in 2025).

=== Mixing ===
Mixing took place at Sound Recorders from 12 to 16 April 1971; some tracks were mixed throughout the sessions. McCartney gave Wangberg free rein to mix the songs as he saw fit and sequence them for the album any way he chose. Among Wangberg's creative decisions was to stitch two songs together to make "Uncle Albert/Admiral Halsey" and introduce thunder sound effects to that song; the thunder was taken from a monaural film clip Wangberg recorded onto two tracks with small differences to make artificial stereo. Wangberg stripped away some of Martin's orchestrations on "Long Haired Lady"; he recalled Paul cried upon listening to the final mix. The engineer also removed the orchestrations from the coda of "The Back Seat of My Car". Paul and Linda were very happy with the album's final mix. Wangberg assembled the stereo master mixes on 22 and 23 April, and prepared a promotional mono mix on 7 May. These were made available only to radio stations and are among the most valuable and sought-after McCartney solo records.

=== Outtakes ===
The Ram sessions resulted in 25 recorded songs, of which 12 were released on Ram, and two – "Another Day" and "Oh Woman, Oh Why" – were released as a single in February 1971. Of the album's numerous outtakes, "Little Woman Love" was later released in 1972 as the B-side of Wings' single "Mary Had a Little Lamb"; "Get on the Right Thing" and "Little Lamb Dragonfly" were released on Wings' 1973 album Red Rose Speedway; (Note: Spinozza played lead guitar on "Get on the Right Thing", while McCracken played it on "Little Lamb Dragonfly".) and "I Lie Around" was completed in 1972 and released as the B-side of "Live and Let Die" in 1973. "When the Wind Is Blowing" and "Sunshine Sometime" were written for a proposed animated film about Rupert Bear. "Sunshine Sometime", along with "Rode All Night", "A Love for You", "Hey Diddle" and "Great Cock and Seagull Race" were later released on the Paul McCartney Archive Collection reissue of Ram in 2012. "When the Wind Is Blowing" appeared on the Archive Collection reissue of Wings' debut album Wild Life in 2018. "Now Hear This Song of Mine" appeared on a limited-edition promotional disc called Brung to Ewe By that Paul and Linda sent to radio stations in 1971.

== Composition ==
=== Context ===
Ram was made during that period when everyone was very negative towards Paul. But I'm not saying that Paul is an angel either. If they had talked the thing out, they would have seen what they [all] thought about [each other] wasn't true. It was four people who had to live. There were just too many personality problems.

— Linda McCartney, Sounds, 1976

Ram's creation coincided with a period of acrimony between McCartney and the other former Beatles. He strongly disliked the Beatles' manager Allen Klein and believed if the Beatles were over, Apple Records should cease. (Note: The Beatles had formed Apple Corps in 1967, while Apple Records was formed in May 1968.) Additionally, most of the profits McCartney made from his music went to Klein and Apple. (Note: In the author Peter Doggett's description, McCartney's publisher Northern Songs "believed he was effectively robbing them of half their potential income".) As a result, he no longer wanted to be part of Apple or the Beatles' contractual partnership. However, his pleas to be released from Apple were ignored by John Lennon, George Harrison and Ringo Starr. (Note: In early December 1970, McCartney shared shared a civil chat with Lennon over the phone, but a social meeting with Harrison ended acrimoniously, strengthening McCartney's desire to end the band's partnership.) By July 1971, his brother-in-law John Eastman recommended he sue his former bandmates to dissolve the partnership. In McCartney's words: "All summer long in Scotland I was fighting with myself as to whether I should do anything like that. It was murderous." He filed a lawsuit against the other three Beatles in London's High Court of Justice for dissolution of the band's contractual partnership on 15 November 1970; it went public on 31 December.

A hearing occurred on 19 January 1971, which none of the four Beatles attended. Paul monitored it from New York but remained focused on recording Ram and devising promotional plans. The 11-day trial began on 19 February, with Paul and Linda attending every session. The single "Another Day" was released the same day, which Paul hoped would divert attention away from the lawsuit. On 12 March, High Court judge Blanshard Stamp found in McCartney's favour and a receiver was appointed. McCartney recalled that the other Beatles "hated me for a period after it because all they could see was me just trying to screw them". On 26 April, Lennon, Harrison and Starr announced they had accepted McCartney's decision to leave the partnership and declined to appeal it.

=== Songs ===
Primarily a rock and pop album, Ram features an varied mix of musical styles such as 1950s rock and roll, hard rock, blues, country, jazz and folk. Perasi describes the album as "a pop opera bordering on operetta, featuring a kaleidoscope of musical languages which would become a trademark of McCartney's canon". Following the lo-fi nature of the McCartney album, Beatles author Robert Rodriguez and Tom Doyle write that with Ram, McCartney returned to the "polish" and "baroque detail" of the Beatles' Abbey Road (1969). Throughout the album, vocals are used to imitate instruments, animal noises and objects such as telephones. Several commentators have described Ram as "quirky", with Doyle writing: "As slick as it was, Ram was also deeply quirky, with its in-jokey lyrics and stylistic about-turns." McCartney later said:

I tried to avoid any Beatles clichés and just went to different places. So the songs became a little more episodic or something. I took on that kind of idea a bit more than I would've with the Beatles. I suppose I was just letting myself be free. So if I wanted to do "Monkberry Moon Delight" with "a piano up my nose", then I figured, that'll be OK.'

McCartney's feelings during this time were reflected in the lyrics of Ram, particularly on tracks such as "Too Many People", where he aimed his anger and frustrations with veiled attacks on Lennon. Other songs, such as "3 Legs" and "Smile Away", have been interpreted as metaphors that symbolise McCartney's disenchantment with his former bandmates and Apple. He treated this period as a haven away from the pressures of fame; "Heart of the Country" reflected this. Other songs, such as "Monkberry Moon Delight", offer surreal lyrics. In a 2012 interview with Pitchfork, McCartney explained that he wanted to capture more of the "surreal" on Ram: "For me, it manifested itself in things like 'Monkberry Moon Delight' or '3 Legs'. They were slightly wacky; it was nice having an opportunity to do that rather than having to write for someone else's preconceived notion." Paul and Linda's love for each other are reflected in "Dear Boy", "Eat at Home" and "Long Haired Lady".

==== Side one ====
The album opens with "Too Many People", an acoustic-based rocker that makes veiled attacks on McCartney's former bandmate. McCartney wrote the song as a response to Lennon's controversial interview with Rolling Stone's Jann Wenner, in which Lennon discussed his thoughts on the Beatles and their legacy, and made cruel remarks about McCartney. (Note: The interview, Lennon Remembers, was conducted in December 1970 and published in January and early February 1971. It deeply affected McCartney. He recalled: "I sat down and pored over every little paragraph, every sentence ... And at the time I thought, 'It's me ... That's just what I'm like. He's captured me so well; I'm a turd.") He later admitted that some of the lyrics had been "a little dig at John and [his wife] Yoko Ono", with "piss off, cake" (or "piece of cake"), "preaching practices" and "you took your lucky break and broke it in two" being direct references to Lennon. (Note: In the original version of the line "You took your lucky break and broke it in two", "You" was "Yoko".) In his book The Lyrics: 1956 to the Present (2021), McCartney said: "They were all references to people thinking that their own truth was the only truth, which is certainly what was coming from John." "Too Many People" is followed by the blues song "3 Legs", about a dog with three legs. McCartney later insisted it was a throwaway blues song and any references toward his former bandmates were misinterpretted.

"Ram On" is a folk song played on ukulele. The title plays on Paul's old stage name, Paul Ramon. With a "dreamy" and "ephemeral" atmosphere, the song's lyrics reinforce the album's title, urging listeners to move forward with confidence and strength in the face of negativity. "Dear Boy" centres on Paul and Linda's relationship and how Linda helped Paul move forward following the Beatles' break-up. Lennon believed "Dear Boy" was directed at him, although McCartney denied this, saying the song was aimed at Linda's ex-husband, Joseph Melvin See Jr. Its musical style has been compared to the Beach Boys, with layered vocal harmonies.

"Uncle Albert/Admiral Halsey", consisting of several unfinished songs combined into one, has been compared to the Abbey Road medley. "Uncle Albert" was inspired by Paul's uncle Albert Kendall, who read Bible passages to him after drinking heavily. According to Paul, he intended the song to be an apology to his uncle's generation: "I was using him as a symbol of that lifestyle and that way of getting 'out of it'." The inspiration for "Admiral Halsey" is unknown. Paul told Beatles historian Mark Lewisohn: "There's an imaginary element in many of my songs – to me, Admiral Halsey is symbolic of authority and therefore not to be taken seriously." Paul contradicted this in a later interview, where he said the song referred to William Halsey Jr., a Navy admiral during World War II. In his book The Lyrics: 1956 to the Present, he said: "'Uncle Albert' contains a lot of punning associated with Admiral Halsey, what with 'berth' / 'birth' and 'sea' / 'see'." The "Uncle Albert" section is slower and more melodic, while the "Admiral Halsey" section is, in Perasi's words, "lively and pounding, with several rhythmic changes and different melodies". The whole song's genres encompass music hall, pop and ballad. The music professor Vincent Benitez Jr. says the song is "a quintessential example of McCartney's style of urbane pop".

Side one ends with "Smile Away", a "driving" rock and roll song with lyrical references to meeting an old friend Paul dislikes. According to the author John Blaney, "Smile Away" contains references to the former Beatles, although Benitez Jr. views the song's vague metaphors as showing, "at best," McCartney's general contempt for the other Beatles.

==== Side two ====
Side two opens with "Heart of the Country", a folk country rock song about the McCartneys' life on their farm, with some scat singing. Paul said the inspiration for "Monkberry Moon Delight" came from an old family "fantasy drink". His young kids used to call milk "monk", so he said Monkberry Moon Delight represented a "fantasy milkshake", comparing it to the Jerry Leiber and Mike Stoller song "Love Potion No. 9" (1959). A funk rock song led by "pounding" piano. Perasi compares its harmonic structure and McCartney's "raucous" vocal performance to "I Put a Spell on You" (1956) by Screamin' Jay Hawkins. Benitez Jr. describes it as Beatlesque due to its nonsensical, surrealistic lyrics.

"Eat at Home" is a Buddy Holly-style rock-and-roll track. Its lyrics are an ode to Paul and Linda's enjoyment of cooking, eating at home, and spending time together after the Beatles' break-up. "Long Haired Lady" is made up of two songs, "Long Haired Lady" and "Love Is Long", and is the longest track on the album. Perasi describes its atmosphere as "dreamlike" and its structure as "disjointed", resulting in a "chaotic effect" between sections. Journalist Bob Woffinden writes that several tracks on Ram "change course halfway through or display less glaring signs of schizophrenia", particularly evident on "Long Haired Lady", which he describes as a "strangely distended track which has several diverse parts, two of which feature decent tunes trying to get out." In the song, the McCartneys engage in lyrical dialogue, reaffirming their love for each other; Linda is featured on lead vocals in the intro.

"Ram On (Reprise)" continues where "Ram On" left off. According to Blaney, McCartney believed reprises suggested album continuity and coherence. Near the end of "Ram On (Reprise)", McCartney sings lyrics that were incorporated into "Big Barn Bed", which was released by Wings on Red Rose Speedway in 1973. McCartney described "The Back Seat of My Car" as the "ultimate teenage song", a "kind of meet-the-parents song". The lyrics are about the narrator's desire for adventure and escape via an automobile, being compared to McCartney's Beatles songs "You Never Give Me Your Money" (1969) and "Two of Us" (1970). According to Allan Kozinn and Adrian Sinclair, the last line of the song, "we believe that we can't be wrong", was directed at McCartney's former bandmates. Musically, Perasi describes the song as a "jazz-ballad built as a mini-suite", arguing its theatrical style predicted that of the rock band Queen.

== Artwork and packaging ==
The back cover of the Ram album. According to some sources, the two beetles mating symbolised how Paul felt the other Beatles were treating him, although Paul denied this.

The album's title came to Paul one day when he and Linda were driving in England: "I remember driving up to Liverpool at some point and deciding that Ram would be a good title for the album, then the picture came, and you can 'ram' a door down, and a 'ram' is a male, like a stag. It just seemed like a good word." He also said "there was the idea of ramming ... pushing ahead strongly". The cover artwork depicts Paul McCartney grabbing a ram's horns. Photographed by Linda in black and white, Paul cut the top off the original picture and glued it onto a piece of cardboard. From there, he coloured in the remaining image with magic markers, using yellow for the sky, a blue rectangular outline for the album title, and a purple, red, yellow and green zigzag border. In the middle of the right zigzag, he wrote L.I.L.Y., an acronym for "Linda I Love You".

For the back cover, Paul drew another yellow backdrop on a piece of cardboard, completing the image with more zigzags, a pair of lips at the bottom, eyes and teeth at the top, a picture of the McCartney family at High Park Farm, and two images of two beetles copulating. According to Peter Brown, the Beatles' former personal assistant, the beetle images symbolised how McCartney felt the other Beatles were treating him. McCartney later claimed that "it was just a funny shot" and believed it was misinterpreted, "To me they were just a couple of little ladybirds or something. I swear to God I didn't think about that." The gatefold sleeve features images of Paul and Linda recording the album and in their spare time against a blue and green background. (Note: One of these images, featuring Paul playing electric guitar, was used as the cover for his 1988 covers album CHOBA B CCCP, released exclusively in the Soviet Union.) The LP sleeve lists the song titles and credits for the musicians (with Spinozza's name misspelled), artwork and production team.

== Release and promotion ==
Before Ram's recording was completed, "Another Day" / "Oh Woman, Oh Why" was released as McCartney's debut solo single on 19 February 1971 in the UK and three days later in the US. It became a worldwide hit, reaching number 2 in the US, number 5 in the UK, and the top 10 in 17 other countries. According to the author Michael Frontani, "Another Day" introduced McCartney's new musical direction, emphasising his and Linda's vocals, while "Oh Woman, Oh Why" showcased that he still possessed the vocal power he demonstrated on early Beatles singles such as "Long Tall Sally" (1964) and "I'm Down" (1965).

Ram was released through Apple Records on 17 May 1971 in the US and four days later in the UK. (Note: Some sources list a UK release date of 28 May.) It is the only album credited jointly to Paul and Linda McCartney. Asked why he credited the album to both of them in 2012, Paul said:

It was a co-effort. On a few songs, we actually sat down and worked them out together. I would sit in the kitchen, plonking away, and she’d sing something and I'd write it down. But the most important thing was her support at the time. It was our album. It was our chance to do our own thing.

EMI reported advanced orders of 100,000 copies; it was named "Best Selling Album of the Month" at month-end. Ram became a huge commercial success. It reached number 1 in the UK and number 2 in the US (kept off the top spot by Carole King's Tapestry), spending 37 weeks on the chart and went platinum by the Recording Industry Association of America (RIAA). Elsewhere, Ram reached number 1 in Canada, the Netherlands, Norway and Spain, number 2 in Italy, number 3 in Australia and Sweden, and number 8 in France and Japan. The album has sold over three million copies.

To promote the album, McCartney made promotional clips for "3 Legs" and "Heart of the Country", which were composed of footage shot at High Park, Campbeltown, on 5–6 June 1971. Roy Benson directed and edited the clips, which were broadcast on BBC's Top of the Pops on 24 June. Paul and Linda also sent a 12" promotional disc called Brung to Ewe By to radio stations. The disc, featuring animal sounds, song snippets and newly recorded soundbites from the McCartneys, was intended to be played as intros to Ram songs on the radio. It later became widely bootlegged. According to the author Garry McGee, the people who heard it were "dumbfounded".

Two singles from the album were released. In America, "Uncle Albert/Admiral Halsey", backed by "Too Many People", was released on 2 August, while in Britain, "The Back Seat of My Car", backed by "Heart of the Country", was released on 13 August. "Uncle Albert/Admiral Halsey" topped the Billboard Hot 100 chart, becoming McCartney's first number-one single as a solo artist, eventually being certified gold. It also won the Grammy Award for Best Arrangement Accompanying Vocalist(s) in 1972. "The Back Seat of My Car" fared worse, peaking at number 39 on the UK singles chart and leaving the chart after five weeks. "Eat at Home", backed by "Smile Away", appeared as a single for the European market, where it charted at number 6 in Norway, number 7 in Holland and number 15 in Italy; it also received decent airplay in the US.

=== Lawsuit ===
Following the commercial success of Ram, McCartney's music publisher Northern Songs took issue with half of the album's songs (and "Another Day") credited to Paul and Linda. Linda was not signed to Northern Songs, so half of the royalties on these songs would go to Paul's new publisher, McCartney Music, and her. In late July 1971, Northern Songs and Maclen Music sued the McCartneys for violating an exclusive rights agreement by collaborating on "Another Day". The publisher's head, Lew Grade, claimed the songwriting credits were fraudulent and Linda could not write songs with Paul. (Note: Linda responded to the lawsuit by writing "Seaside Woman", which was recorded by Wings in 1972 and released as a single in 1977 under the name Suzy and the Red Stripes.) Paul later said: "They were so wonderful to me after all the successes I'd brought them with me and [Lennon] – more than they ever dreamed of earning anyway – they immediately slapped a million-dollar lawsuit on [Linda and me]. So they were charming pals who shall be remembered ever thus ..." Both parties agreed the issue of royalties for the album could be decided later. In June 1972, Northern Songs' owner Associated Television (ATV) announced that "all differences between them have been amicably settled", and the McCartneys signed a new seven-year co-publishing contract between ATV and McCartney Music.

== Critical reception ==
I did get very depressed. Everything I did was so slagged off by the critics and everyone that I began to think I had lost the knack. ... I began to believe all those people who were saying I wasn't very good and that I couldn't make decent records. Before that point, I had thought very seriously about jacking it all in and spending the rest of my life just farming or something.

— Paul McCartney in response to Ram's reviews, 1971

Upon its release, Ram was panned by music critics. In a particularly vitriolic review for Rolling Stone, Jon Landau said the album "represented the nadir in the decomposition of Sixties rock thus far". Further calling it "incredibly inconsequential" and "monumentally irrelevant", he wrote that the album exposes McCartney as having benefited from working with the Beatles, particularly Lennon, who "held the reins in on McCartney's cutsie-pie, florid attempts at pure rock muzak" and kept him from "going off the deep end that leads to an album as emotionally vacuous as Ram". McCartney was particularly hurt by the harsh reviews − especially as he had attempted to address the points raised in criticism of his earlier album, McCartney, by taking a more professional approach.

Other critics were vehement in their reactions to Ram. Playboy accused McCartney of "substituting facility for any real substance", and compared the album to "watching someone juggle five guitars: It's fairly impressive, but you keep wondering why he bothers." In NME, Alan Smith called it "an excursion into almost unrelieved tedium" and McCartney's worst release up to that point. Robert Christgau, for The Village Voice, called it "a bad record, a classic form/content mismatch", but Paul Levinson countered that the mismatch was "in the wires and components of Christgau's stereo". Christgau felt that McCartney succumbed to "conspicuous consumption" by overworking himself and obscenely producing a style of music meant to be soft and whimsical.

The Daily Express' David Wigg and The Guardian's Geoffrey Cannon found Ram inferior to McCartney's works with the Beatles, while Chris Charlesworth of Melody Maker called it inferior to the recent releases of Harrison (All Things Must Pass) and Lennon (Plastic Ono Band). Charlesworth argued that Ram was "a good album by anybody's standards" and superior to most releases by British groups and singers, but "you expect too much from a man like Paul McCartney". Robert Hilburn of the Los Angeles Times argued that whereas McCartney could be "excused as a mistake in judgment", Ram makes you question McCartney's "abilities and direction" in a post-Beatles world and predicted it would have less of an impact than McCartney had. However, some critics believed Ram was an improvement over McCartney. Years after its release, Roy Carr and Tony Tyler of NME wrote, "it would be naive to have expected the McCartneys to produce anything other than a mediocre record ... Grisly though this was, McCartney was to sink lower before rescuing his credibility late in 1973."

One positive review came from Record Mirror's Lon Goddard, who said, "Rarely does [Paul] ever stoop to a predictable progression and there is always a twist to his lines." Highlighting Linda's credit on the album, he concluded: "We haven't lost a hero, we've gained a duo." According to Kozinn and Sinclair, many of the positive reviews "worked hard to be positive without making great claims". In Billboard's review, an anonymous writer wrote, "Paul & Linda debut like the sweethearts of rock 'n' roll reborn, as the ex-Beatle continues to play the rock Romeo with little else on his musical mind," further calling the album fun and praising the backing band. Disc and Music Echo's Mike Ledgerwood was confused by Ram on first listen, but praised it upon further listens as "first-class musical entertainment" and a "perfectly splendid LP". Ray Connolly of the Evening Standard also praised the record's musical variety, arguing it continues where the Beatles' White Album (1968) left off. He summarised: "To those people who are ready to write McCartney off, I say give this record a lot of plays. For anyone who has grown up and old in the same generation as McCartney it makes superb listening."

== Subsequent events ==
=== Formation of Wings ===
According to Perasi, Ram's poor reception was partly responsible for McCartney's decision to form a band, which he had thought of for a while. He included Linda in the band, as he wanted her to be involved in all of his musical projects despite her lack of musical experience. Linda did not wish to join, but he convinced her and taught her how to play keyboards. In late June, Paul asked Seiwell and McCracken if they wanted to join; Seiwell accepted, but McCracken declined due to other musical and family commitments. Paul wanted an experienced musician in the band, so in mid-July, he invited former Moody Blues guitarist Denny Laine, whom he had known since the early 1960s, who accepted. The new band, dubbed Wings, recorded their first album Wild Life between July and October 1971. Wild Life departed from the heavy production of Ram and was mostly recorded live in the studio. It was released in December to negative reviews.

=== Responses from the other Beatles ===
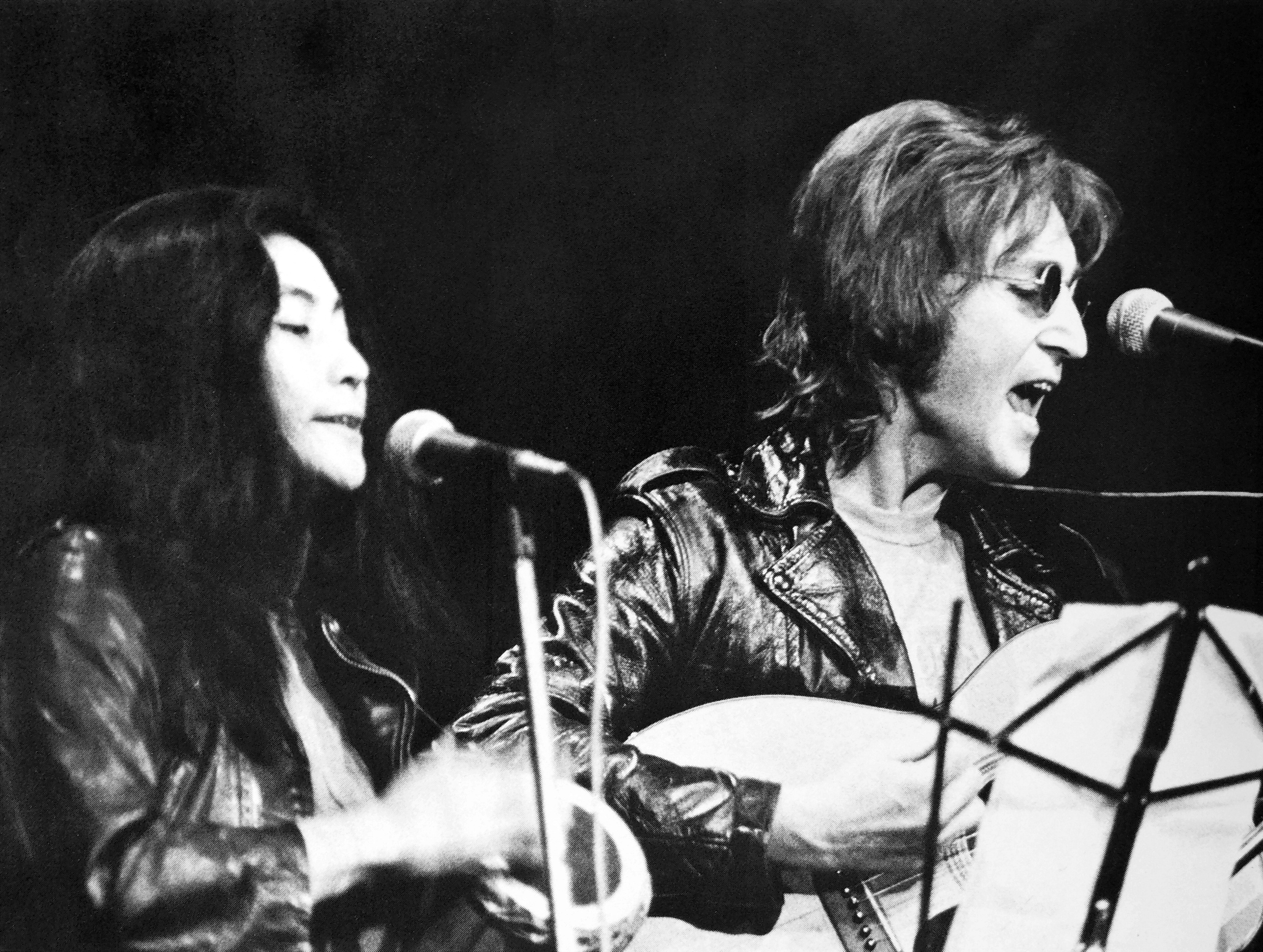
Yoko Ono and John Lennon in 1971. Believing several songs on Ram targeted him and Ono, Lennon responded with "How Do You Sleep?", in which he attacked McCartney's songwriting and role in the Beatles' break-up.

McCartney's fellow ex-Beatles, all of whom were riding high in critical favour with their recent releases, vocally criticised Ram. The album ultimately represented a low point in Lennon and McCartney's relationship. Lennon felt attacked by "Too Many People" and interpreted the image of the two beetles copulating as references to him and Ono. (Note: Lennon did admit that he liked the beginning and end of "Uncle Albert/Admiral Halsey".) Lennon, Harrison and Starr reportedly interpreted the track "3 Legs" as an attack on them, although McCartney denied this. In Linda's words: "They thought the whole album was about them. And then they got very upset."

Lennon responded with "How Do You Sleep?", which he began recording five days after the UK release of Ram. The song features Harrison on slide guitar, and was released in September 1971 on the album Imagine, early editions of which included a postcard of Lennon pulling a pig's ears in a parody of Ram's cover photograph. Lennon's lyrics attack McCartney for the Beatles break-up, references the Paul is dead theory, and alluded to "Another Day" and McCartney's Beatles song "Yesterday" with the line, "The only thing you done was Yesterday / And since you've gone you're just another day," and later "The sound you make is Muzak to my ears / You must have learned something in all those years". In addition to conducting a war of words in the British music press, "Crippled Inside", another track on Imagine, was thought to be directed at McCartney. McCartney never responded to "How Do You Sleep?". Instead, he wrote "Dear Friend", an attempt at reconciliation with Lennon that was released on Wild Life. Throughout the 1970s, their relationship slowly improved and the pair had reconciled before Lennon's death in 1980.

Starr disliked Ram as well, telling Melody Maker: "I feel sad about Paul's albums ... I don't think there's one [good] tune on [Ram] ... he seems to be going strange. It's like he's not admitting he can write great tunes." Despite his comments, McCartney and Starr socialised for the first time since the Beatles' break-up at Mick and Bianca Jagger's wedding in May 1971. Harrison did not comment on the album, while George Martin believed Linda was not a "substitute" for Lennon.

=== Thrillington ===
Shortly before Ram's release, McCartney produced an easy listening instrumental cover version of Ram called Thrillington under the pseudonym Percy "Thrills" Thrillington. He wanted someone to record a big-band version of the album, but could not find anyone to do it, so he did it himself. It was arranged and conducted by Richard Anthony Hewson and recorded in mid-June 1971 at EMI Studios in London. Upon its completion, the album was shelved following the formation of Wings and left unreleased until 1977, eventually falling into obscurity. Thrillington was later included as part of the 2012 reissue of Ram.

== Legacy ==
=== Retrospective reviews ===
Professional ratings
Aggregate scores
Source	Rating
Metacritic	86/100 (Deluxe edition)
Review scores
Source	Rating
AllMusic	5/5 stars
American Songwriter	3/5 stars
Blender	5/5 stars
Christgau's Record Guide	C+
Mojo	4/5 stars
MusicHound Rock	3.5/5
Pitchfork	9.2/10
Q	2/5 stars
Rolling Stone	4.5/5 stars
Uncut	8/10

In later decades, Ram's critical reception has grown substantially, and it is now viewed as one of McCartney's best albums, if not the best. The album's 2012 reissue received an aggregate score of 86 out of 100 from Metacritic, based on twelve reviews, indicating "universal acclaim". A Mojo writer said in 2012 that "it sounds quintessentially McCartney", while Doyle wrote that while Band on the Run (1973) might be casual listeners' favourite McCartney album, "Ram is the aficionados' choice: the sound of Paul McCartney gleefully revelling in his creative freedom." Rodriguez described Ram as McCartney's "first masterpiece", arguing that it captured its creator's strengths in the same way Starr's Beaucoups of Blues (1970), Harrison's All Things Must Pass and Lennon's Plastic Ono Band did.

Several modern critics argue that the qualities Ram was originally criticised for became part of its charm and appeal. McGee believed that the album was unjustly criticised on its original release due to McCartney's role in the Beatles' break-up. Additionally, reviewers have praised the album for its honesty, "earthiness" and for being guileless, a quality Raj Dayal of American Songwriter believes most singers and songwriters lack. Ram has been as an early indie pop album, and one that anticipated various singer-songwriter "handmade pop" projects. Simon Vozick-Levinson of Rolling Stone argued that Ram "sounds ahead of its time" and asked "how many indie rockers could pull off such a daffy masterpiece?". Reviewing in 2012, Pitchfork's Jayson Greene similarly felt McCartney was "inventing an approach to pop music that would eventually become someone else's indie pop".

Some critics praised the album's cohesion rather than its individual songs. AllMusic's Stephen Thomas Erlewine wrote: "These songs may not be self-styled major statements, but they are endearing and enduring, as is Ram itself, which seems like a more unique, exquisite pleasure with each passing year." The album's musical scope has also been retrospectively praised. Vozick-Levinson described Ram as "a grand psychedelic ramble full of divine melodies and orchestral frippery". Ultimate Classic Rock's Nick DeRiso argued that the album's Beatlesque qualities give it "a dizzying momentum", further calling it a record that "never sits still for too long".

I do albums and, like a fool, I listen to what people say about them. [...] The terrible thing is it puts you off your own stuff. It plays into your self-doubts, even though you overcame those self-doubts to write that song. You're left with this smell of the music – a whiff of something not very good – and that sticks with you. But then you get rescued. A while ago, one of my nephews said, "Ram's my all-time favorite album." I thought it was dead and gone ... So I listened to it. "Wow, I get what I was doing."

— Paul McCartney, Rolling Stone, 2016

Nevertheless, not all reviews have remained positive. In a retrospective review in 1981, Christgau doubled down on his dislike of the album and panned McCartney's songs in general as pretentious "crotchets ... so lightweight they float away even as Paulie layers them down with caprices." Reviewing the 2012 reissue, David Quantick of Uncut felt that, although it is not as "legendary" as publicised, the album is "occasionally brilliant and historically fascinating" as "post-Beatles mish-mash", while Q magazine still found Ram "frustratingly uneven". In another Ultimate Classic Rock article, DeRiso felt the album, like Lennon's Imagine, was "hampered" by McCartney and Lennon's digs at each other, although both records "survive these missteps by sheer force of musical will". He also found the album may have been improved through collaboration, as songs like "Uncle Albert/Admiral Halsey" appear self-indulgent without Lennon or George Martin, and others such as "The Back Seat of My Car" feel "a little unfocused" and "too overstuffed with ideas". However, DeRiso believed these faults made Ram what it is, "a wildly inventive gem", whose "essential pop magnetism [and] its compulsive listenability ... can't be denied".

In 2016, Ultimate Classic Rock included Ram in a list compiling the best rock albums of 1971. In 2023, Ram was ranked number 450 on Rolling Stone's list of the 500 Greatest Albums of All Time.

=== Tributes ===
In 2009, two tribute albums featuring all of the album's songs were put together. The first, Ram On L.A., was compiled by the website Aquarium Drunkard and released as a digital download, featuring Los Angeles-based acts. The second, Tom: A Best Show on WFMU Tribute to Ram, was compiled by WFMU DJ Tom Scharpling for the New Jersey radio station's annual fundraising marathon as a CD made available exclusively to those who donated to his show. Artists included Aimee Mann, Death Cab for Cutie and Ted Leo, among others.

In 2012, Danish rock singer/songwriter Tim Christensen, American singer/songwriters Mike Viola and Tracy Bonham, and Christensen's solo band the Damn Crystals did a one-off tribute show, performing Ram in full, along with other McCartney post-Beatles songs, at Vega in Copenhagen, in celebration of McCartney's 70th birthday. In 2013, this tribute concert was released as the DVD/CD and DVD/2-LP album Pure McCartney.

In 2021, Denny Seiwell and Fernando Perdomo produced Ram On: The 50th Anniversary Tribute to Paul and Linda McCartney's Ram. The album featured over 100 global musicians creating a new version of Ram and the single tracks "Another Day" and "Oh Woman, Oh Why". Contributors included Seiwell, Spinozza, and Marvin Stamm from the original sessions, along with Davey Johnstone, Will Lee, Joey Santiago of the Pixies, Eric Dover, formerly of Jellyfish, and Carnie Wilson. Cherry Red Records released the album on 17 May 2021.

== Reissues ==
Ram, along with McCartney's Wings over America (1976) and Tug of War (1982) albums, was issued in the US on compact disc on 18 January 1988. In 1993, the album was remastered and reissued on CD as part of The Paul McCartney Collection series with "Another Day" and "Oh Woman, Oh Why" as bonus tracks.

On 21 May 2012 (in the UK) and 22 May (in the US), the album was reissued by McCartney's current label, Hear Music, as part of the Paul McCartney Archive Collection. This reissue included a new remaster of the original album, the mono mix (appearing officially for the first time on compact disc), various bonus tracks from the recording sessions, the original Thrillington album, a DVD of films and music videos (including a documentary on the album's making), a 112-page book about the album's history and various memorabilia. The mono version was also released commercially in 2012 as a limited edition LP. The 2012 reissue was accompanied by a Record Store Day-exclusive edition of the "Another Day" single.

For its 50th anniversary, the album was reissued as a limited-edition half-speed-mastered vinyl by UM^{e}.

== Track listing ==
All tracks are written by Paul McCartney, except * with Linda McCartney.

Side one
No.	Title	Length
1.	"Too Many People"	4:10
2.	"3 Legs"	2:44
3.	"Ram On"	2:26
4.	"Dear Boy" (*)	2:12
5.	"Uncle Albert/Admiral Halsey" (*)	4:49
6.	"Smile Away"	3:51

Side two
No.	Title	Length
1.	"Heart of the Country" (*)	2:21
2.	"Monkberry Moon Delight" (*)	5:21
3.	"Eat at Home" (*)	3:18
4.	"Long Haired Lady" (*)	5:54
5.	"Ram On (Reprise)"	0:52
6.	"The Back Seat of My Car"	4:26
Total length:		43:15

Additional tracks on 1993 reissue
No.	Title	Length
13.	"Another Day" (*)	3:42
14.	"Oh Woman, Oh Why"	4:35
Total length:		51:32

== Personnel ==
- Paul McCartney – lead and harmony vocals, acoustic and electric guitars, bass, piano, keyboards, ukulele on "Ram On"
- Linda McCartney – harmony and backing vocals; co-lead vocals on "Long Haired Lady"
- Hugh McCracken – guitar
- Denny Seiwell – drums
- David Spinozza – guitar on "3 Legs", "Eat at Home", "The Back Seat of My Car", and "Another Day"
- Heather McCartney – backing vocals on "Monkberry Moon Delight"
- Marvin Stamm – flugelhorn on "Uncle Albert/Admiral Halsey"
- Orchestra – "Uncle Albert/Admiral Halsey", "Long Haired Lady", and "The Back Seat of My Car"

Technical

- Paul McCartney – producer
- Linda McCartney – producer, cover photography
- Armin Steiner – engineer
- Dixon Van Winkle – engineer
- James William Guerico – engineer
- Phil Ramone – engineer
- Ted Brosnan – engineer
- Tim Geelan – engineer
- Eirik Wangberg – mixing engineer

== Charts ==
=== Weekly charts ===
Original album
Chart (1971)	Peak position
Australian Kent Music Report Chart	3
Canadian RPM Albums Chart	1
Dutch Mega Albums Chart	1
French SNEP Albums Chart	8
Japanese Oricon LPs Chart	8
Norwegian VG-lista Albums Chart	1
Spanish Albums Chart	1
Swedish Albums Chart	3
UK Albums Chart	1
US Billboard Top LPs & Tape	2
US Cash Box Top 100 Albums	2
US Record World 100 Top LP's	2

Reissue
Chart (2012)	Peak position
Austrian Albums Chart	52
Belgian Albums Chart (Flanders)	75
Belgian Albums Chart (Wallonia)	61
Dutch Mega Albums Chart	31
French SNEP Albums Chart	43
German Albums (Offizielle Top 100)	29
Japanese Oricon Weekly Chart	14
Norwegian VG-lista Albums Chart	19
Spanish Albums Chart	39
Swedish Albums Chart	35
UK Albums Chart	41
US Billboard 200	24
West German Media Control Albums Chart	29

=== Year-end charts ===
Chart (1971)	Position
Australian Albums Chart	6
Dutch Albums Chart	3
French Albums Chart	10
UK Albums Chart	6
US Billboard Year-End	38

=== Certifications ===
Region	Certification	Certified units/sales
Canada (Music Canada)	Platinum	100,000^{^}
United Kingdom (BPI)	Silver	60,000^{‡}
United States (RIAA)	Platinum	1,000,000^{^}
^{^} Shipments figures based on certification alone.^{‡} Sales+streaming figures based on certification alone.
