= Another Day (Paul McCartney song) =

- A-side label of the US 7-inch single

Single by Paul McCartney
- B-side: "Oh Woman, Oh Why"
- Released: 19 February 1971
- Recorded: 12 October 1970; 21 January 1971
- Studio: Columbia and A & R Recording, New York
- Genre: Pop, folk rock
- Length: 3:41
- Label: Apple
- Songwriters: Paul and Linda McCartney
- Producer: Paul McCartney

Paul McCartney singles chronology
"Another Day" (1971)	"Uncle Albert/Admiral Halsey" (1971)

Official audio
- Another Day on YouTube

"Another Day" is a song by the English rock musician Paul McCartney that was released as the A-side of a non-album single in February 1971. It was his debut single as a solo artist following the Beatles break-up in 1970. McCartney credited his wife Linda as a co-writer on the song, triggering legal action from ATV Music on behalf of the publishing companies Northern Songs and Maclen Music. The lyrics describe the daily routine of a lonely woman, using an observational style similar to McCartney's narrative in the 1966 ballad "Eleanor Rigby".

McCartney recorded "Another Day" in New York City during the sessions for his and Linda's 1971 album Ram. The single was an international hit, peaking at number 2 in the United Kingdom, number 5 in the United States, and topping charts in Australia and France. The song was dismissed by many music critics, however, who found it inconsequential and reflective of McCartney having a conservative outlook. In addition to appearing on several McCartney compilation albums, it was included as a bonus track on the 1993 and 2012 reissues of Ram. It was also included on The 7" Singles Box in 2022.

== Background ==
Although McCartney did not formally record the song until after the band's break-up, he previewed "Another Day" during the Beatles' Let It Be sessions in January 1969. The song's lyric adopts an observational style reminiscent of "Eleanor Rigby"; Denny Seiwell, the drummer on the Ram sessions, called it "'Eleanor Rigby' in New York City". The lyrics describe the drudgery and sadness of an unnamed woman's life at work and at home.

McCartney's wife Linda provided vocal harmonies on "Another Day". Describing his and Linda's harmonies, McCartney said he wanted "'our' sound" as he sought to create a musical identity independent of the Beatles. McCartney decided to list Linda as co-writer of more than half the songs on Ram, and this decision extended to "Another Day". Despite her lack of musical and songwriting experience, he said that his wife had been a genuine writing partner, suggesting ideas for lyrics and melodies. Linda's co-writing credits were later regarded as business manoeuvres in the post-Beatles legal matters. In author Peter Doggett's description, Northern Songs, McCartney's publisher, "believed he was effectively robbing them of half their potential income".

In July 1971, Northern Songs and Maclen Music sued Paul and Linda McCartney for violating an exclusive rights agreement via their musical collaborations on "Another Day" and Ram. In June the following year, ATV Music, on behalf of Northern and Maclen, announced that "all differences between them have been amicably settled", with McCartney's lawyers arguing it had been his prerogative to collaborate with whomever he chose, regardless of his or her musical abilities. Paul and Linda signed a new seven-year, co-publishing contract between ATV and McCartney Music.

On 19 February 1971, McCartney was due to appear at the High Court in London on the first day of the hearing into the dissolution of the Beatles' partnership. He thought it would be good to release a single on the same day to coincide with his appearance to show he was still active musically. Dixon Van Winkle, an assistant engineer on the Ram sessions, recalled that he suggested "Another Day" after McCartney asked him to select one of the tracks they had been working on for a single. With McCartney's blessing, Van Winkle mixed the song and pressed 100 copies for radio stations. He added: "The next day I heard it on the air, I realized ... we got carried away with the bass part ... it pumped like crazy. But we never remixed the song, and Paul never said anything." McCartney chose the B-side, "Oh Woman, Oh Why".

== Recording ==
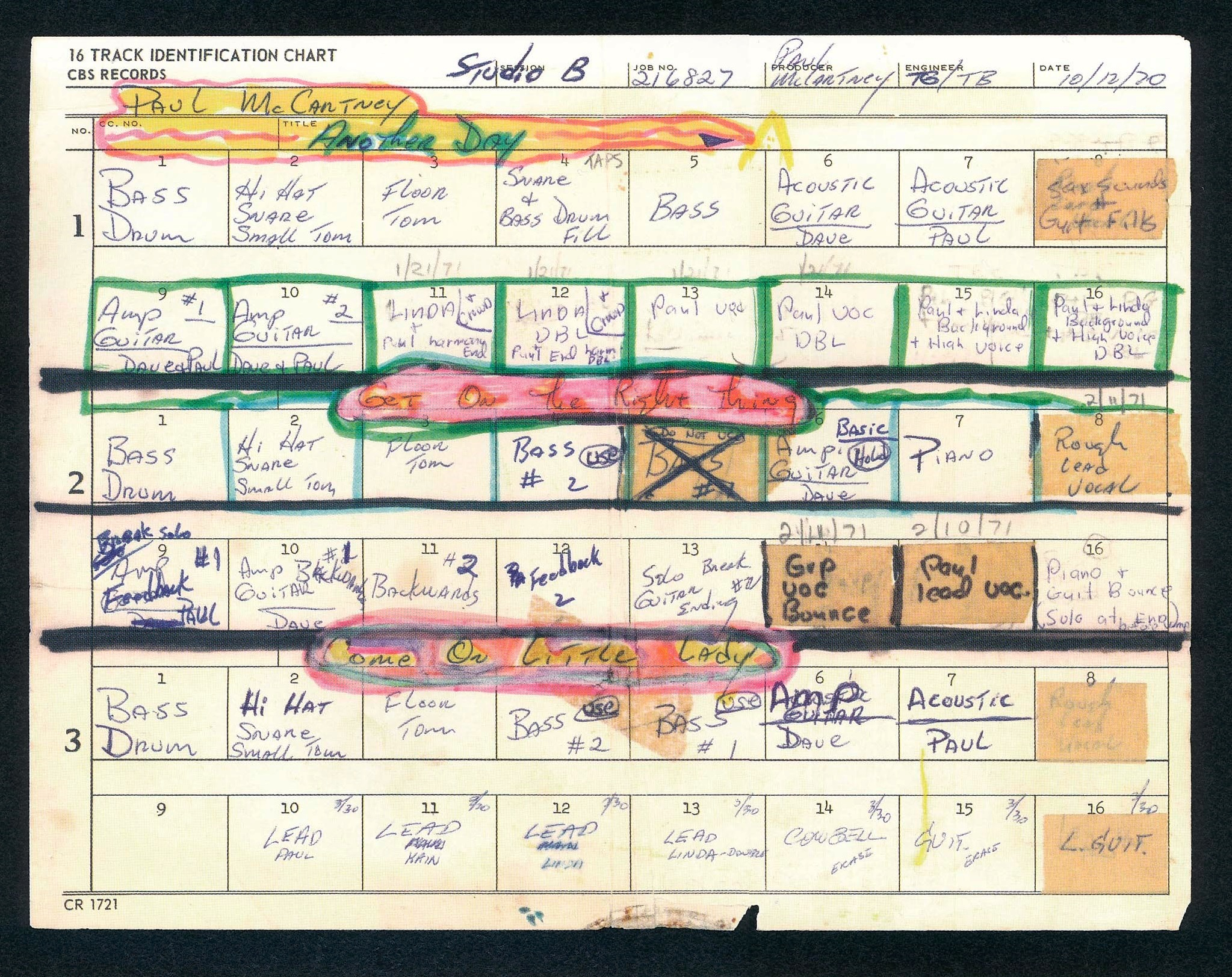
CBS's 16 track sheet for "Another Day" (plus two other songs)

Seiwell said that "Another Day" was the first song taped during the Ram sessions. Recording took place at Columbia Studios in New York City on 12 October 1970. The basic track consisted of McCartney and Dave Spinozza on acoustic guitars and Seiwell on drums. At the same session, McCartney and Spinozza added electric guitars, and McCartney overdubbed his bass guitar part. Seiwell also added a percussion effect, "tapping out a rhythm on a telephone directory found out in the studio".

According to the annotations on the track sheet, "Another Day" was completed on 21 January 1971. Sound effects and lead and harmony vocals were added that day at A & R Studio in New York. The mixing session also took place at A & R on 8 February.

== Release ==
"Another Day" was released on 19 February 1971 in the United Kingdom, with "Oh Woman, Oh Why" as the B-side. It was McCartney's debut single as a solo artist. The song peaked at number 2 in the UK in March 1971 and number 5 in the United States in April. It was number 1 in Australia, for one week, and in France.

Although "Another Day" and "Oh Woman, Oh Why" were not originally included on the album, some CD re-releases of Ram have one or both songs as bonus tracks. "Another Day" has also appeared on several of McCartney's greatest hits albums, including All the Best! (1987) and Pure McCartney (2016). It also appeared on the Wings compilations Wings Greatest (1978) and Wingspan: Hits and History (2001), even though the song predates the band's formation. The single was re-released as part of Record Store Day 2012. It was included on the Special and Deluxe editions of the 2012 remaster of Ram. The song was included on an EP (along with "Oh Woman, Oh Why", "Junk" and "Valentine's Day") released only in Mexico.

McCartney has played the song live several times, first on his 1993 tour and later on his 2013 Out There tour.

== Critical reception ==
On release, many rock critics derided "Another Day" as irrelevant and as a song that conveyed McCartney as having bourgeois sensibilities and a focus on conservative values. One reviewer likened it to an advertising jingle for underarm deodorant. Beatles biographer Nicholas Schaffner described the song's reception: "Many of the rock critics, out for McCartney's blood, dismissed 'Another Day' as 'Paulie picking his nose.' More charitable observers trilled along with the chorus: 'It's just another song.'"

As with Ram, the single especially disappointed writers who were expecting McCartney to rebound from his 1970 solo debut, McCartney, and produce an artistic statement on the scale of George Harrison's All Things Must Pass and John Lennon's Plastic Ono Band. Music journalist Andrew Grant Jackson comments that, given McCartney had been the Beatle who announced the band's break-up, the song's despondent tone contrasted starkly with singles such as "Instant Karma!" and "My Sweet Lord", in which Lennon and Harrison, respectively, confidently embraced their freedom from the Beatles. He views "Another Day" as "a continuation of McCartney's 1970 depression tunes".

Cash Box described the song as being an intriguing song with "vignette verses and a haunting chorus". Record World called it "very pop, the kind of melody [McCartney's] famous for".

Writing in 1981, NME critic Bob Woffinden said that while the song is "slight and simple", the critical disparagement it had continued to receive overlooks the "delicate charm", compositional discipline and real-life characterisation that serve as positive qualities which, he rued, were completely lacking on Ram. Beatles historian Bruce Spizer views it as "a catchy pop tune that has been unfairly ridiculed over the years". In deeming the lyrics "trite", he continues, its detractors fail to appreciate that the song's female protagonist is herself "leading a life of boring and lonely everyday routines".

== In popular culture ==
"Another Day" is referenced in Lennon's 1971 song attacking McCartney, titled "How Do You Sleep?" Lennon describes McCartney's new music as Muzak and, in the second verse, he sings: "The only thing you done was yesterday / And since you've gone you're just another day".

== Personnel ==
According to Luca Perasi:

- Paul McCartney – lead vocals, backing vocals, electric and acoustic guitars, bass guitar
- Linda McCartney – harmony vocals
- David Spinozza – electric and acoustic guitars
- Denny Seiwell – drums, percussion

== Charts ==
=== Weekly charts ===
Chart (1971)	Peak position
Australian Kent Music Report	1
Austrian Singles Chart	10
Belgian Singles Chart (Flanders)	10
Canadian RPM Top 100	4
Canadian RPM MOR	6
Dutch Singles Chart	3
Irish Singles Chart	1
Japanese Oricon Singles Chart	6
New Zealand (Listener)	5
Norwegian VG-lista Singles Chart	3
South Africa (Springbok Radio)	7
Spanish Singles Chart	1
Swiss Singles Chart	7
UK Singles Chart	2
US Billboard Hot 100	5
US Billboard Easy Listening	4
West German Media Control Singles Chart	6

=== Year-end charts ===
Chart (1971)	Rank
Australia GoSet	50
Canadian RPM Singles Chart	58
Dutch Singles Chart	64
Japanese Oricon Singles Chart	43
US Billboard Top Pop Singles	60
US Billboard Top Easy Listening Singles	44
UK Singles Chart	26

=== Sales ===
Region	Sales
Japan (Oricon)	247,000+
