= Wings Greatest =

Compilation album by Wings
- Released: 1 December 1978
- Recorded: 1970–1977
- Genre: Rock
- Length: 54:28
- Labels: Parlophone (UK); Capitol (US & Aus)
- Producers: Paul McCartney; Linda McCartney; George Martin

Wings chronology
London Town (1978)	Wings Greatest (1978)	Back to the Egg (1979)

Professional ratings
Review scores
Source	Rating
AllMusic	4.5/5 stars
Christgau's Record Guide	B+
The Essential Rock Discography	7/10
MusicHound	3/5
Q	4/5 stars

Wings Greatest is the first compilation album by the British rock band Wings, released in the United Kingdom on 1 December 1978. The album is also the first compilation from bandleader Paul McCartney's post-Beatles career and it contains two tracks released before the establishment of Wings: "Another Day" (credited to "Paul McCartney") and "Uncle Albert/Admiral Halsey" (credited to "Paul & Linda McCartney").

== History ==
The album was compiled after McCartney's decision to leave EMI's American label, Capitol, for a six-year stay with Columbia (United States and Canada only), though he remained with EMI worldwide during his US sabbatical from Capitol.

Four of the twelve tracks make their album debut with this compilation: "Another Day", "Junior's Farm", "Hi, Hi, Hi" and "Mull of Kintyre". "Live and Let Die" had previously appeared on the soundtrack album of the same name but did not appear on any previous McCartney albums.

The album was originally intended as a double with the second LP being Cold Cuts: a collection of previously unreleased outtakes by Wings. The resulting album became Wings Greatest single LP. Not one song was excerpted from 1971's Wild Life or 1975's Venus and Mars.

The Bulgarian pressings of the album did not include the song "Live and Let Die".

Wings Greatest was remastered and reissued in 1993, as part of The Paul McCartney Collection, and again in 2018.

== Promotion ==
The album was promoted by a TV commercial in the UK, which featured several members of the public (played by actors) singing Wings tunes in public places. At the end a dustman, waiting in his lorry at a set of traffic lights (in Abbey Road), sings to himself an out of tune rendition of "Band on the Run", at which point Paul, Linda and Denny pull up alongside and Paul shouts out "You're a bit flat mate!". The driver leans out his window and says "Funny, I only checked them this morning!"

== Artwork ==
Aubrey Powell and George Hardie of Hipgnosis are credited with the design, as well as Paul and Linda McCartney.

The front cover of Wings Greatest depicts a chryselephantine (gold and ivory) statuette of Semiramis created by famed Art Deco sculptor Demétre Chiparus. This antique statuette was purchased by Linda McCartney at a 1978 auction and Paul McCartney decided this statuette would be ideal as the cover for the band's first greatest hits album.

On 14 October 1978, the McCartney family flew to Switzerland, accompanied by a photographer named Angus Forbes, to arrange a photography session depicting the statuette in genuine snow. The snowdrift backdrop within the image was created with the assistance of a hired snow-plough, and the actual image upon the cover was an aerial photograph taken by helicopter.

The rear cover depicts the record covers of the twelve releases, mostly singles, from which each of the songs were taken, in columns on either side of the album. In the middle is a photograph of Paul, Linda, and Denny Laine. The background is another scene of the Alps.

The statuette also appears on the inner sleeves of the original vinyl, as well as on the record's labels. It can also be seen on the album cover of Wings' next (and last) studio album, Back to the Egg, in the background, on the mantlepiece.

== Track listing ==
All tracks are written by Paul and Linda McCartney except where noted.

Side one
No.	Title	Writer(s)	Origin	Length
1.	"Another Day"		non-album single (1971) (Paul)	3:42
2.	"Silly Love Songs"		Wings at the Speed of Sound (1976)	5:52
3.	"Live and Let Die"		Live and Let Die soundtrack (1973)	3:11
4.	"Junior's Farm"		non-album single (1974)	4:21
5.	"With a Little Luck"	P. McCartney	London Town (1978)	5:45
6.	"Band on the Run"		Band on the Run (1973)	5:10

Side two
No.	Title	Writer(s)	Origin	Length
1.	"Uncle Albert/Admiral Halsey"		Ram (1971) (Paul & Linda)	4:48
2.	"Hi, Hi, Hi"		non-album single (1972)	3:07
3.	"Let 'Em In"		Wings at the Speed of Sound (1976)	5:09
4.	"My Love"		Red Rose Speedway (1973)	4:08
5.	"Jet"		Band on the Run (1973)	4:06
6.	"Mull of Kintyre"	P. McCartney, Denny Laine	non-album single (1977)	4:43

== Charts ==
=== Weekly charts ===
Chart (1978–79)	Position
Australian Kent Music Report Chart	8
Canadian RPM Albums Chart	25
Dutch Mega Albums Chart	18
Japanese Oricon LP Chart	24
New Zealand Albums Chart	16
Norwegian VG-lista Albums Chart	20
Swedish Albums Chart	32
UK Albums Chart	5
US Billboard 200	29
US Cashbox albums chart	21
US Record World albums chart	23
West German Media Control Albums Chart	18

=== Year-end charts ===
Chart (1979)	Position
Australian Albums Chart	53
UK Albums Chart	43

=== Certifications ===
Region	Certification	Certified units/sales
Canada (Music Canada)	Platinum	100,000^{^}
Hong Kong (IFPI Hong Kong)	Gold	10,000^{*}
United Kingdom (BPI)	Platinum	300,000^{^}
United States (RIAA)	Platinum	1,000,000^{^}
^{*} Sales figures based on certification alone.^{^} Shipments figures based on certification alone.
