= The Back Seat of My Car =

Single by Paul and Linda McCartney

from the album Ram
- B-side: "Heart of the Country"
- Released: 13 August 1971 (UK only)
- Recorded: 22 October 1970 – 29 January 1971
- Studio: CBS and A & R, New York City
- Genre: Rock
- Length: 4:29
- Label: Apple Records
- Songwriter: Paul McCartney
- Producers: Paul and Linda McCartney

Paul McCartney singles chronology
"Uncle Albert/Admiral Halsey" (1971)	"The Back Seat of My Car" (1971)	"Eat at Home" (1971)

"The Back Seat of My Car" is a song written by Paul McCartney, released as the closing track of his and his wife Linda's 1971 album, Ram. Several months later, it was released as the only single from the album in the UK, peaking at number 39. The song modulates stylistically between a sweeping piano-and-orchestra ballad similar to McCartney's "The Long and Winding Road" and upbeat rock sections before ending in a raucous and passionate finale.

== Background ==
"The Back Seat of My Car" has its origins as an unfinished concept from a holiday McCartney took with then-girlfriend Maggie McGivern in Sardinia in summer 1968. It was one of several compositions Paul McCartney presented to the Beatles in January 1969 during their Get Back rehearsals at Twickenham Film Studios in London. Played on 14 January, the song was still a work-in-progress, with the lyrics unfinished while the song's melody was well developed.

According to McCartney, this song and other car-based songs in his late-Beatles and early solo career, such as "Two of Us" and "Helen Wheels," were inspired by the long road trips he and Linda used to take as the Beatles were breaking up. Most of the song is a piano-based ballad, but it is interspersed with orchestral sections and sections inspired by 50s-style rock 'n' roll. Allmusic critic Stewart Mason likens the main tune to those of McCartney's Beatle songs "Two of Us" and "You Never Give Me Your Money." Mason compares the effect of the various song sections to the medley from the Beatles Abbey Road and to some of the Beach Boys' post-Pet Sounds work. McCartney said of the song:

"Back Seat of My Car" is the ultimate teenage song, and even though it was a long time since I was a teenager and had to go to a girl's dad and explain myself, it's that kind of meet-the-parents song. It's a good old driving song. [Sings] "We can make it to Mexico City." I've never driven to Mexico City, but it's imagination. And obviously "back seat" is snogging, making love.

McCartney further stated that "That's a really teenage song, with the stereotypical parent who doesn't agree, and the two lovers are going to take on the world: 'We believe that we can't be wrong.' I always like the underdog."

== Recording ==
Recording for Ram began in October 1970 at CBS Recording Studios in New York City. The typical format for a recording session included McCartney, drummer Denny Seiwell and guitarist David Spinozza or Hugh McCracken rehearsing a song in the morning and then recording the basic track in the afternoon and evening. Other guitar parts would be overdubbed, along with bass by McCartney. McCartney, Seiwell and McCracken recorded the instrumental backing and vocals for "The Back Seat of My Car" on 22 October 1970.

After recording the album's basic tracks, the McCartneys went to Phil Ramone's A & R Recording Studio in New York to record violin, cello and horn overdubs for several songs, including "The Back Seat of My Car". Beatles producer George Martin scored the song's orchestral overdubs, and McCartney conducted members of the New York Philharmonic in a mid-January 1971 session.

In March and April 1971, the McCartneys and sometimes Seiwell mixed the album at Sound City Studios in Los Angeles. The single version and the mono mix made for the LP differ slightly, with the latter's fade out described by authors Chip Madinger and Mark Easter as "much smoother", though as the two fade outs remain the same, the difference could be due to the dynamic range compression used in mastering the single.

== Release and reception ==
Apple Records released Ram in the US on 17 May 1971 and in the UK eleven days later, with "The Back Seat of My Car" sequenced as the closing track. Apple released different singles from the album in the British, American and European markets, with "The Back Seat of My Car" released in the UK on 13 August 1971, backed with "Heart of the Country". While the US single "Uncle Albert/Admiral Halsey" reached number one, "The Back Seat of My Car" disappointed, peaking at number 39 in the UK charts.

Author Chris Ingham describes "The Back Seat of My Car" as an "earthily romantic paean to teenage sex". Praising Ram for its lush orchestration and "playful verve", author Peter Doggett opines that the album's culmination in the mini-suite "The Back Seat of My Car" is "a triumph of pop arrangement". Music critic Tim Riley describes Ram as both frivolous and the most reminiscent of Sgt. Pepper's Lonely Hearts Club Band of all the Beatles' solo albums, but adds that "The Back Seat of My Car" is closer to "Two of Us" than "A Day in the Life". He counts it and the opening track, "Too Many People", as the ones which "deserve" McCartney's bass playing.

John Lennon felt that this song, among others on the album, was directed critically towards him; in particular, he perceived the protagonists who sing "We believe that we can't be wrong" to be himself and Yoko Ono. AllMusic critic Stewart Mason claims that in the context of the criticism McCartney was receiving in the aftermath of the Beatles breakup, this line sounds more like a "statement of personal intent" than the declaration of love it could be in the context of the song's lyrics themselves.

In a contemporary review for Ram, Jon Landau of Rolling Stone described "The Back Seat of My Car" as one of only two good songs he enjoyed on the album, the other being "Eat at Home". Landau further described the song as "the album's production number".

Critic Stephen Thomas Erlewine of AllMusic said the song demonstrated the "imaginative and gorgeous" arrangements on Ram and called the song its "sad, soaring finale." Mason considers it to be the "true highlight" of Ram. According to Ultimate Classic Rock critic Nick DeRiso, the song "is a little unfocused—too overstuffed with ideas, too reliant on multi-tracked McCartneys, not as rustic as his solo debut but somehow tossed-off sounding anyway—and simply too long" but is also "gutsy and unprecious at one point and then a testament to McCartney's enduring pop sensibilities at others." DeRiso also states that "As McCartney bolts from '50s-era rock to cocktail-lounge crooning to swooning violins, and back again—all inside of this one final tune, mind you—there is a sense of limitless possibility.

The song was also included on The 7" Singles Box in 2022.

== Personnel ==
According to Chip Madinger and Mark Easter, except where noted:

- Paul McCartney – lead vocal, piano, bass guitar
- Hugh McCracken – electric guitar
- Denny Seiwell – drums
- David Spinozza – electric guitar
- Unnamed musicians from the New York Philharmonic – violins, cellos, horns, harp
