= Dear Boy (song) =

Song by Paul & Linda McCartney

from the album Ram
- Released: 17 May 1971
- Recorded: 1 March 1971
- Genre: Art pop
- Length: 2:12
- Label: Apple
- Songwriters: Paul and Linda McCartney
- Producers: Paul and Linda McCartney

"Dear Boy" is a song from the Paul McCartney album Ram. Credited to Paul and Linda McCartney, the song was written during the couple's lengthy holiday on their farm in the Mull of Kintyre. The lyrics were written by Paul about how lucky he was to have Linda as his wife.

== Background ==
"Dear Boy" was written as an autobiographical song about his relationship with his wife, Linda. He says in a 1971 interview,

Dear Boy was my attempt at an autobiography about myself and how lucky I was to have Linda. I never realized how lucky I was to have her until I began writing the song.

"Dear Boy" was also written as a message to Linda McCartney's ex-husband. In the 2012 Ram Special Edition Documentary, McCartney describes the song as written about Linda's former husband, Joseph Melville See Jr., and the things he hadn't seen in her. He said on the topic in 2001,

Dear Boy was actually a song to Linda's ex-husband: "I guess you never knew what you had missed." I never told him that, which was lucky, because he's since committed suicide. And it was a comment about him, 'cause I did think, 'Gosh, you know, she's so amazing, I suppose you didn't get it.'

— Paul McCartney, Mojo, 2001

McCartney's former Beatles bandmate John Lennon, however, thought that the song was about him. Certain lines such as "She was just the cutest thing around" could have referred to McCartney as being the cute Beatle. He may have changed the gender to conceal his identity and Lennon mentioned in subsequent interviews that the Ram album had subtle allusions to himself and Yoko Ono. Since then, however, McCartney has said that the song was not about Lennon.

== Personnel ==
- Paul McCartney – lead vocals, electric guitar, bass guitar, piano, percussion
- Linda McCartney – backing vocals
- Hugh McCracken – guitar
- Denny Seiwell – drums, percussion
- Paul Beaver – synthesizer
- Jim Guercio – backing vocals
