= Eat at Home =

Single by Paul and Linda McCartney

from the album Ram
- B-side: "Smile Away"
- Released: 1971 (Continental Europe, Australia, New Zealand, South America and Japan only)
- Recorded: 16 October 1970 (basic track); 30 March 1971 (overdubs)
- Studio: Columbia Studio (basic track); Sound Recorder Studio (overdubs)
- Genre: Pop; rock
- Length: 3:18
- Label: Apple
- Songwriters: Paul and Linda McCartney
- Producers: Paul and Linda McCartney

Paul McCartney singles chronology
"The Back Seat of My Car" (1971)	"Eat at Home" (1971)	"Wonderful Christmastime" (1979)

"Eat at Home" is a 1971 single by Paul and Linda McCartney that also appeared on their album Ram from the same year. The song, a standard rock number, features McCartney on lead vocals, electric guitar and bass, and Linda McCartney performing backing vocals.

== Lyrics and music ==
Paul McCartney described the lyrics of "Eat at Home" as "a plea for home cooking – it's obscene." Beatle biographer John Blaney described it as fitting within the theme of many of McCartney's songs of the period, "extolling the virtues of domestic bliss and ... the love of a good woman." Music professor Vincent Benitez also considers the theme to be a celebration of Paul's domestic bliss with Linda in the wake of the Beatles' breakup.

"Eat at Home" is in the key of A major. It is mostly a three-chord rock song, with predominant use of the tonic chord of A, the dominant chord of E and the subdominant chord of D. It also employs the subtonic chord of G in turnaround sections between the verses and the bridge passages. Blaney described the music as being an "upbeat slice of retro-pop" that was influenced by McCartney's hero Buddy Holly.

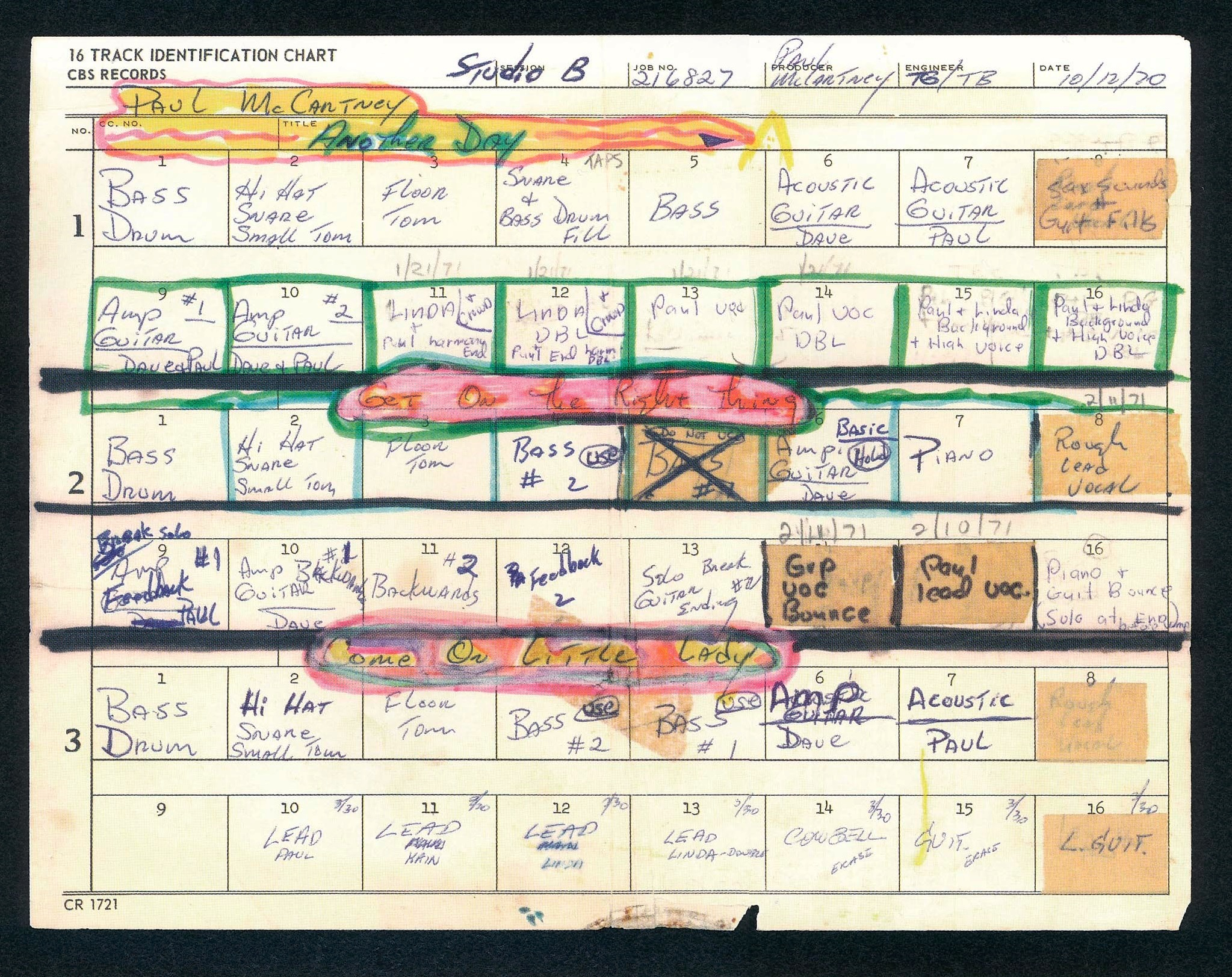
CBS's 16 track sheet for "Eat at Home" (plus two other songs) shows it named as "Come on Little Lady", the song's opening line.

== Reception ==
Music critic Stewart Mason of AllMusic described it as McCartney's homage to Buddy Holly, and Stephen Thomas Erlewine, also of Allmusic, described it as "a rollicking, winking sex song." In a contemporary review for Ram, Jon Landau of Rolling Stone described "Eat at Home" as one of only two good songs he enjoyed on the album, being "a pleasant, if minor, evocation of the music of Buddy Holly (with some very nice updating)". Goldmine contributor John Borack rated "Eat at Home" among his top 10 McCartney solo songs, praising its melody, its "slightly country-influence guitar pickin’" and Denny Seiwell's "pounding" drums.

Although John Lennon was highly critical of many of the songs on Ram, feeling they were veiled attacks on him, he publicly admitted that he enjoyed this particular song quite a bit.

Although not released as a single in the UK or the US, "Eat at Home" was released as a single in several European countries, South America, Japan, Australia and New Zealand, and reached No. 7 in the Netherlands and #6 in Norway. Even in the US it received considerable radio airplay without having been released as a single.

== Personnel ==
- Paul McCartney – lead vocals, bass guitar, electric guitar
- Linda McCartney – backing vocals
- David Spinozza – electric guitar
- Denny Seiwell – drums

Source: The Paul McCartney Project
