= Uncle Albert/Admiral Halsey =

Single by Paul & Linda McCartney

from the album Ram
- B-side: "Too Many People"
- Released: 2 August 1971 (US only)
- Recorded: 6 November 1970
- Studio: Columbia Studio B and A&R (New York City)
- Genre: Progressive pop
- Length: 4:49
- Label: Apple
- Songwriters: Paul McCartney, Linda McCartney
- Producers: Paul McCartney, Linda McCartney

Paul McCartney singles chronology
"Another Day" (1971)	"Uncle Albert/Admiral Halsey" (1971)	"The Back Seat of My Car" (1971)

"Uncle Albert/Admiral Halsey" is a song by Paul and Linda McCartney from the album Ram. Released in the United States as a single on 2 August 1971, it reached number one on the Billboard Hot 100 on 4 September 1971, making it the first of a string of post-Beatles, Paul McCartney-penned singles to top the US pop chart during the 1970s and 1980s. Billboard ranked the song as number 22 on its Top Pop Singles of 1971 year-end chart. It became McCartney's first gold record after the break-up of the Beatles.

== Elements and interpretation ==
"Uncle Albert/Admiral Halsey" is composed of several unfinished song fragments stitched together in a similar manner to the medley from the Beatles' 1969 album Abbey Road. The orchestral arrangements by George Martin were recorded in New York at A & R Recording, along with other instruments by McCartney and his new band. The project was moved to Los Angeles, where Paul and Linda added vocals – her first experience of recording in a professional studio. The song is notable for its thunderstorm and environmental sound effects added by engineer Eirik Wangberg in Los Angeles; McCartney had invited him to mix and sequence the Ram album in any way he saw fit, and he copied the thunder from a monaural film soundtrack, then fashioned an artificial stereo version of it for the song.

McCartney stated that "Uncle Albert" was based on his uncle: "He's someone I recall fondly, and when the song was coming it was like a nostalgia thing." He also stated: "I had an uncle – Albert Kendall – who was a lot of fun, and when I came to write 'Uncle Albert'/'Admiral Halsey' it was loosely about addressing that older generation, half thinking, 'What would they think of the way my generation does things?' That's why I wrote the line 'We're so sorry, Uncle Albert.'" McCartney also told an American journalist, "As for Admiral Halsey, he's one of yours, an American admiral", referring to Fleet Admiral William "Bull" Halsey (1882–1959). McCartney has described the "Uncle Albert" section of the song as an apology from his generation to the older generation, and Admiral Halsey as an authoritarian figure who ought to be ignored.

McCartney talks to Uncle Albert on the telephone using "a posh British accent", apologizing but not overly concerned that he does not have time to talk.

McCartney said that the lyric, "'Hands across the water/Heads across the sky' refers to Linda and me being American and British."

== Reception ==
Paul McCartney won the Grammy Award for Best Arrangement Accompanying Vocalists in 1971 for the song. The single was certified Gold by the Recording Industry Association of America for sales of over one million copies.

According to AllMusic critic Stewart Mason, fans of Paul McCartney's music are divided in their opinions of this song. Although some fans praise it as "one of his most playful and inventive songs", others criticize it for being "exactly the kind of cute self-indulgence that they find so annoying about his post-Beatles career". Mason himself considers it "churlish" to be annoyed by the song, given that the song is not intended to be completely serious, and he praises the "Hands across the water" section as being "lovably giddy". Ultimate Classic Rock critic Nick DeRiso states that the song feels "more calculatedly twee than truly inspired, despite its episodic construction" and that its main weakness is that it exposes McCartney's awareness of his own charm.

In a contemporary review of Ram, Jon Landau of Rolling Stone gave "Uncle Albert/Admiral Halsey" a negative review, saying the song is "a piece with so many changes it never seems to come down anywhere, and in the places that it does, sounds like the worst piece of light music Paul has ever done." Cash Box said that the song "is bursting with fine melodies and interesting musical changes certain to please both AM and underground programmers". Record World called it a "sound collage of Paul's best song ideas".

A retrospective 2012 Pitchfork review by Jayson Greene states: "Uncle Albert/Admiral Halsey is not only Ram's centerpiece, it is clearly one of McCartney’s five greatest solo songs. As the slash in the title hints, it's a multi-part song, starring two characters. To put its accomplishments in an egg-headed way: It fuses the conversational joy listeners associated with McCartney's melodic gift to the compositional ambition everyone assumed was Lennon's. To put it a simpler way: Every single second of this song is joyously, deliriously catchy, and no two seconds are the same."

== Later release ==
"Uncle Albert/Admiral Halsey" appears on the Wings Greatest compilation album released in 1978, even though Ram was not a Wings album.

The song appears on several solo Paul McCartney compilations: the US version of All the Best! (1987), as well as Wingspan: Hits and History (2001), and on both the standard and deluxe versions of Pure McCartney (2016). It was also included on The 7" Singles Box in 2022.

== Personnel ==
- Paul McCartney – vocals, electric guitar, acoustic guitar, piano, bass, celesta, organ
- Linda McCartney – backing vocals
- Hugh McCracken – acoustic and electric guitar
- Denny Seiwell – drums
- Paul Beaver – synthesizer
- David Nadien, Aaron Rosand – violin
- Marvin Stamm, Mel Davis, Ray Crisara, Snooky Young – brass
- New York Philharmonic Orchestra – orchestral backing
- George Martin – orchestral arrangement
- Eirik Wangberg – mix engineer, thunder sound effect

== Charts and certifications ==
=== Weekly charts ===
Chart (1971)	Peak position
Australia (Kent Music Report)	5
Canadian RPM Top 100 Singles	1
West German Media Control Singles Chart	30
Mexican Singles Chart	3
New Zealand	1
US Billboard Hot 100	1
US Easy Listening (Billboard)	9

=== Year-end charts ===
Chart (1971)	Rank
Australia (Kent Music Report)	67
Canada Top Singles (RPM)	14
US Billboard Hot 100	22

=== Certifications ===
Region	Certification	Certified units/sales
United States (RIAA)	Gold	1,000,000^{^}
^{^} Shipments figures based on certification alone.
