= Allan Kozinn =

American journalist, music critic, and teacher

Allan Kozinn (born July 28, 1954) is an American journalist, music critic, and teacher.

Kozinn received bachelor's degrees in music and journalism from Syracuse University in 1976. He began freelancing as a critic and music feature writer for The New York Times in 1977 and joined the paper's staff in 1991. Before joining the Times, he was a contributing editor to High Fidelity and Keynote magazines, and a frequent contributor to Guitar Player, Keyboard, Pulse, and other publications. He was also the first music critic for The New York Observer.

Kozinn has written a number of books, including Guitar: The History, the Music, the Players (1984), Mischa Elman and the Romantic Style (1990), The Beatles (1995), Classical Music: A Critic's Guide to the 100 Most Important Recordings (2004), Got That Something: How the Beatles' I Want to Hold Your Hand Changed Everything (2014) and Spoleto 40 - Spoleto Festival USA 40 Years (2016). In 2014, Kozinn began working with researcher Adrian Sinclair on The McCartney Legacy, a multi-volume biography of Paul McCartney. Volume 1 was published in December 2022.

Kozinn joined the faculty of New York University in 2004, where, through 2014, he taught courses in music criticism, Baroque music, and the Beatles. He also taught a course in the history of musical interpretation at the Juilliard School.

In September 2012, The New York Times reassigned Kozinn from his former duties as a classical music critic to general cultural reporting, which caused controversy at the time. In December 2014, Kozinn left the Times, in a round of layoffs and buyouts at the newspaper. He moved to Portland, Maine, in 2015, and was the classical music critic at the Portland Press Herald from 2015 to 2020 and a freelance critic for the Times, The Wall Street Journal and The Washington Post. He is currently a co-host of the video podcast Things We Said Today - A Beatles Video Podcast.

Kozinn is married to the writer Paula Brochu. The couple resides in Portland, Maine.
