= Denny Seiwell =

American drummer (b. 1943)

- Born: July 10, 1943 (age 82); Lehighton, Pennsylvania, U.S.
- Genres: Rock
- Occupation: Musician
- Instrument: Drums
- Formerly of: Paul McCartney and Wings

Denny Seiwell (born July 10, 1943) is an American drummer and a founding member of the rock band Wings. He also drummed for Billy Joel and Liza Minnelli and played in the scores for the films Waterworld, Grease 2, and Vertical Limit. His drumming was used in TV shows such as Happy Days and Knots Landing.

== Biography ==
Seiwell was born and raised in Lehighton, Pennsylvania, the son of Donald Seiwell and Fay Carrigan. He has a brother, Darryl. Denny Seiwell is a graduate of Lehighton High School and was a member of the first Carbon County Band in 1961. After graduating from high school, Seiwell enlisted in the United States Navy, in the rate of Musician, playing in the Navy Band. He moved to New York City and caught the eye of Paul McCartney, who recruited him to be in his band Wings. According to Seiwell, the band was like one big family living between London and the McCartneys' farm in Scotland. After leaving the band, Seiwell moved to Los Angeles, where he has resided since 1975. Seiwell stated in 2019 that he and McCartney have kept in touch since 1993. He acted as a consultant on the Wingspan documentary film in 2001.

In 2021, Seiwell produced Ram On – The 50th Anniversary Tribute to Paul and Linda McCartney's Ram with Fernando Perdomo.

== Discography ==
=== Paul and Linda McCartney ===
- 1971: Ram (Capitol)

=== Paul McCartney and Wings ===
Studio albums

- 1971: Wild Life (Apple/EMI)
- 1973: Red Rose Speedway (Apple/EMI)

Singles

These are singles that have not appeared on any official album except on compilations.

- 1971: "Give Ireland Back to the Irish"
- 1972: "C Moon"
- 1972: "Mary Had a Little Lamb"
- 1972: "Hi, Hi, Hi"

Compilations

- 1978: Wings Greatest (EMI)
- 1987: All the Best! – Performs on "C Moon", "Another Day", "Live and Let Die" and "Uncle Albert/Admiral Halsey"
- 2001: Wingspan: Hits and History (EMI)
- 2016: Pure McCartney – Performs on "Heart of the Country", "Dear Boy", "Uncle Albert/Admiral Halsey", "Too Many People" and "The Back Seat of My Car"
- 2025: Wings (Capitol)

Soundtrack

- Live and Let Die – Plays on the title track

Single

- 1973: Live and Let Die (Apple/EMI) – single

=== Various ===
- 1969: Kai Winding/JJ Johnson – Betwixt and Between (A&M Records)
- 1970: John Denver – Take Me to Tomorrow (RCA)
- 1970: Les Fradkin - "Song of a Thousand Voices" Sunflower Records
- 1971: Astrud Gilberto – Gilberto with Turrentine (CTI)
- 1971: Billy Joel – Cold Spring Harbor (Columbia)
- 1973: Donovan – Essence to Essence (Epic)
- 1975: Keith Godchaux and Donna Godchaux – Keith & Donna (Round)
- 1975: Art Garfunkel – Breakaway (Columbia)
- 1977: Rick Danko – Rick Danko (Arista)
- 1977: Liza Minnelli – Tropical Nights (Columbia)
- 1982: Janis Joplin – Farewell Song (Columbia) – posthumous compilation
- 1984: Deniece Williams – I'm So Proud (Columbia)

=== Production ===
- 2021: Ram On – The 50th Anniversary Tribute to Paul and Linda McCartney's Ram – With Fernando Perdomo
