= Paul McCartney discography =

Recordings by the English musician

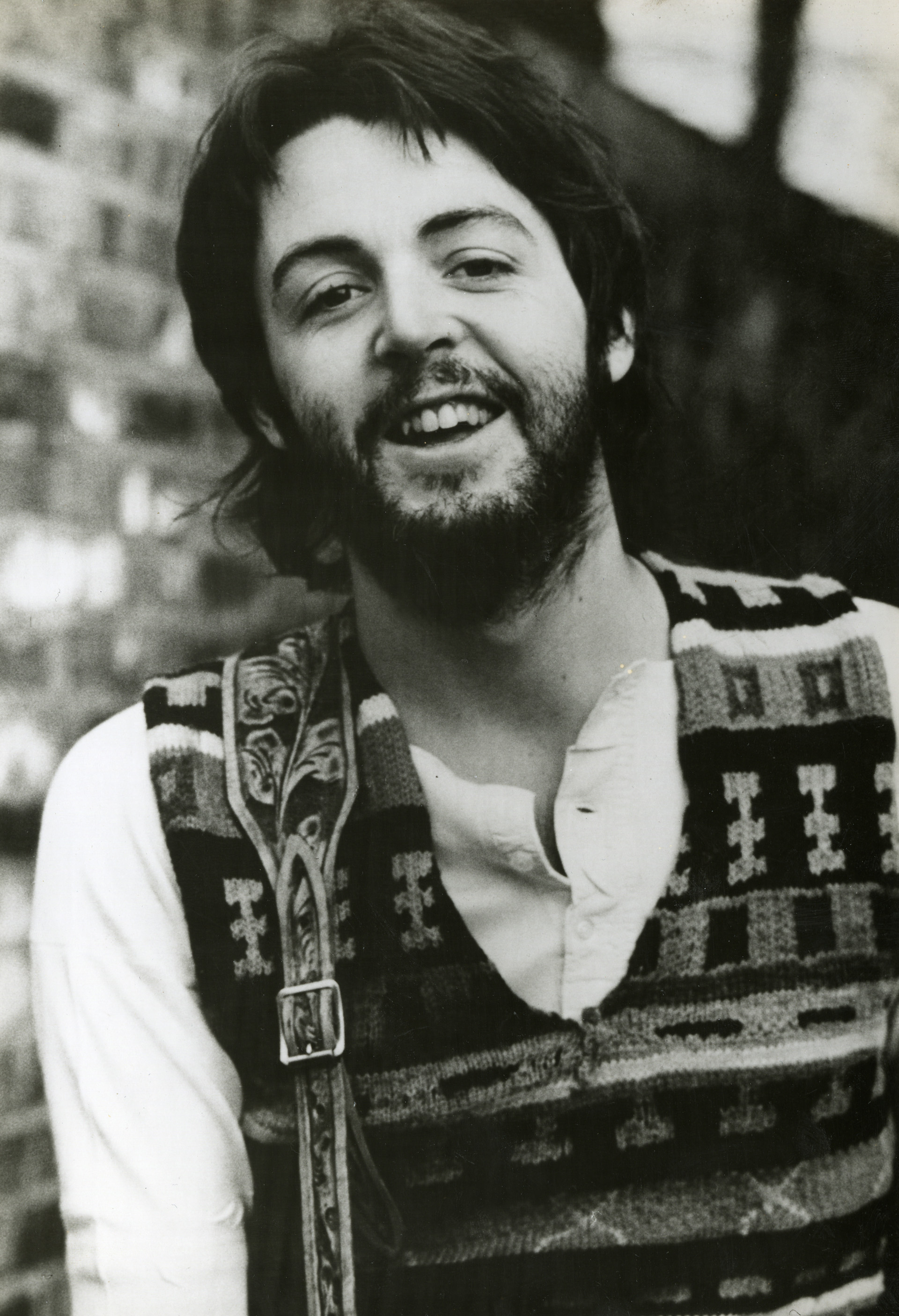
- McCartney in 1969
- Studio albums: 27
- Extended plays: 4
- Live albums: 10
- Compilation albums: 5
- Remix albums: 2
- Singles: 132
- Classical albums: 7
- Electronica albums: 4
- Box sets: 6
- Archival box sets: 13
- Limited release albums: 15

The discography of Paul McCartney consists of 27 studio albums, 5 compilation albums, 10 live albums, 4 extended plays, 132 singles, 2 remix albums, 7 classical albums, 4 electronica albums, 6 box sets, 13 archival box sets and 15 limited release albums. Before his career as a solo artist, McCartney, a founding member of the Beatles, enjoyed unprecedented success.

After the Beatles disbanded, he debuted as a solo artist with the 1970 album McCartney and went on to form the band Wings with his first wife, Linda, and Denny Laine. Under McCartney's leadership, Wings became one of the most successful bands of the 1970s. He wrote or co-wrote their US or UK number-one hits, such as "My Love", "Band on the Run", "Listen to What the Man Said", "Silly Love Songs", and "Mull of Kintyre". He resumed his solo career in 1980 and has been touring as a solo artist since 1989. Apart from Wings, his UK or US number-one hits include "Uncle Albert/Admiral Halsey" (with Linda), "Coming Up", "Pipes of Peace", "Ebony and Ivory" (with Stevie Wonder), and "Say Say Say" (with Michael Jackson). McCartney is the first artist to hit number one on the Billboard charts under five different names: the Beatles, Paul & Linda McCartney, Paul McCartney & Wings, Wings, Paul McCartney and Michael Jackson.

In 2012, McCartney was ranked eleventh best-selling singles artist in the United Kingdom with 10.2 million singles sold.

In 2010, McCartney started releasing archival album box sets in the Paul McCartney Archive Collection. As of 2020, there have been 14 multi-disc sets released for 13 of his best albums, mostly the first half of his solo career and Wings. These deluxe edition coffee table books include visual materials on DVD, Blu-ray, streaming and limited theatrical engagements.

== Albums ==
=== Solo and Wings studio albums ===
Title	Album details	Peak chart positions										Certifications (sales thresholds)
Title	Album details	UK	AUS	BEL	GER	NLD	NOR	NZ	SWE	SWI	US	Certifications (sales thresholds)
McCartney	Released: 17 April 1970; Label: Apple	2	3	—	15	3	1	—	2	—	1	MC: Platinum; RIAA: 2× Platinum
Ram (Paul and Linda McCartney)	Released: 17 May 1971; Label: Apple/EMI, Capitol	1	3	75 (Note: Charted upon reissue as part of Paul McCartney Archive Collection.)	22	4	1	—	1	—	2	BPI: Silver; MC: Platinum; RIAA: Platinum
Wild Life (Wings)	Released: 3 December 1971; Label: Apple/EMI, Capitol	11	3	117	47	6	4	—	3	88	10	MC: Gold; RIAA: Gold
Red Rose Speedway (Paul McCartney and Wings)	Released: 30 April 1973; Label: Apple/EMI, Capitol	5	1	3	56	6	4	—	2	89	1	BPI: Gold; MC: Platinum; RIAA: Gold
Band on the Run (Paul McCartney and Wings)	Released: 30 November 1973; Label: Apple/EMI, Capitol	1	1	4	15	5	1	23	5	22	1	BPI: Platinum; MC: Platinum; RIAA: 3× Platinum; SNEP: Gold
Venus and Mars (Wings)	Released: 27 May 1975; Label: Capitol	1	2	84	11	5	1	1	2	—	1	BPI: Platinum; MC: Platinum; RIAA: Platinum
Wings at the Speed of Sound (Wings)	Released: 26 March 1976; Label: Capitol	2	2	72	32	3	2	2	7	—	1	BPI: Gold; RIAA: Platinum; SNEP: Gold
London Town (Wings)	Released: 31 March 1978; Label: Parlophone (Worldwide) Capitol (US)	4	3	—	6	1	2	4	4	—	2	BPI: Gold; BVMI: Gold; NVPI: Platinum; RIAA: Platinum; SNEP: Gold
Back to the Egg (Wings)	Released: 8 June 1979; Label: Parlophone (worldwide) Columbia (North America)	6	3	—	16	11	5	9	5	—	8	BPI: Gold; MC: 2× Platinum; RIAA: Platinum
McCartney II	Released: 16 May 1980; Label: Parlophone (worldwide) Columbia (North America)	1	6	—	18	11	5	5	5	—	3	BPI: Gold; ARIA: Platinum; RIAA: Gold
Tug of War	Released: 26 April 1982; Label: Parlophone (worldwide) Columbia (North America)	1	2	3	1	1	1	4	1	—	1	BPI: Gold; ARIA: Platinum; MC: Gold; RIAA: Platinum; SNEP: Gold
Pipes of Peace	Released: 31 October 1983; Label: Parlophone (worldwide) Columbia (North America)	4	9	63	20	11	1	38	4	12	15	BPI: Platinum; MC: Platinum; RIAA: Platinum
Give My Regards to Broad Street (soundtrack album)	Released: 22 October 1984; Label: Parlophone (worldwide) Columbia (North America)	1	10	—	25	24	4	25	9	—	21	BPI: Platinum; MC: Gold; RIAA: Gold
Press to Play	Released: 25 August 1986; Label: Parlophone, Capitol, EMI	8	22	—	30	21	8	—	17	28	30	BPI: Gold
Снова в СССР (covers album)	Released: 31 October 1988; Label: Melodiya (Μелодия), EMI	63	—	—	—	56	—	—	—	—	109	
Flowers in the Dirt	Released: 5 June 1989; Label: Parlophone, Capitol, EMI	1	18	54	9	15	1	—	2	13	21	BPI: Platinum; BVMI: Gold; GLF: Gold; IFPI SWI: Gold; MC: Gold; RIAA: Gold; SNEP: Gold
Off the Ground	Released: 1 February 1993; Label: Parlophone, Capitol, EMI	5	8	—	2	5	2	4	10	5	17	BPI: Silver; BVMI: Platinum; ARIA: Gold; IFPI SWI: Gold; MC: Gold; RIAA: Gold; SNEP: Gold
Flaming Pie	Released: 5 May 1997; Label: Parlophone, Capitol, EMI	2	9	19	6	9	3	23	11	8	2	BPI: Gold; IFPI NOR: Gold; RIAA: Gold
Run Devil Run (majority covers album)	Released: 4 October 1999; Label: Parlophone, Capitol, EMI	12	99	44	21	53	12	—	23	36	27	BPI: Gold
Driving Rain	Released: 12 November 2001; Label: Parlophone, Capitol, EMI	46	—	—	23	76	18	—	19	—	26	BPI: Silver; RIAA: Gold
Chaos and Creation in the Backyard	Released: 12 September 2005; Label: Parlophone, Capitol, EMI	10	33	15	4	5	8	—	3	9	6	BPI: Gold; MC: Gold; RIAA: Gold; SNEP: Gold
Memory Almost Full	Released: 4 June 2007; Label: Hear Music/MPL	5	33	25	18	6	4	30	3	20	3	BPI: Gold; MC: Gold; RIAA: Gold
Kisses on the Bottom (majority covers album)	Released: 7 February 2012; Label: Hear Music/MPL	3	15	8	9	5	7	35	8	12	5	BPI: Silver
New	Released: 15 October 2013; Label: Hear Music/MPL	3	22	6	6	6	1	27	9	12	3	
Egypt Station	Released: 7 September 2018; Label: Capitol	3	4	2	1	2	3	12	4	5	1	
McCartney III	Released: 18 December 2020; Label: Capitol	1	6	5	1	1	6	28	2	2	2	
The Boys of Dungeon Lane	Released: 29 May 2026; Label: Capitol	1	5	1	2	1	7	9	3	2	5	

=== Classical studio albums ===
Title	Album details	UK	US
Paul McCartney's Liverpool Oratorio (with Carl Davis)	Released: 7 October 1991; Label: EMI Classics	—	177
Standing Stone	Released: 29 September 1997; Label: EMI Classics	—	194
Working Classical	Released: 1 November 1999; Label: EMI Classics	—	—
Ecce Cor Meum	Released: 25 September 2006; Label: EMI Classics	141	—
Ocean's Kingdom	Released: 3 October 2011 (UK) 4 October 2011 (US); Label: Decca	—	143

=== Other studio albums ===
Title	Album	Peak chart positions							
Title	Album	UK	BEL	FRA	JPN	NLD	SPA	SWI	US
The Family Way (by the George Martin Orchestra)	Released: 6 January 1967; Label: Decca (UK) London (US)	—	—	—	—	—	—	—	—
Thrillington (Percy "Thrills" Thrillington)	Released: 29 April 1977; Label: Regal Zonophone (UK) Capitol (US)	—	—	—	—	—	100	—	—
Strawberries Oceans Ships Forest (The Fireman)	Released: 15 November 1993; Label: Parlophone (UK) Capitol (US)	—	—	—	—	—	—	—	—
Rushes (The Fireman)	Released: 21 September 1998; Label: Hydra, EMI	—	—	—	—	—	—	—	—
Liverpool Sound Collage (Sound collage album, also credited to the Beatles, Super Furry Animals and Youth)	Released: 21 August 2000; Label: Hydra (UK) Capitol (US)	—	—	—	—	—	—	—	—
Twin Freaks (with The Freelance Hellraiser)	Released: 13 June 2005; Label: Parlophone	—	—	—	—	—	—	—	—
Electric Arguments (The Fireman)	Released: 24 November 2008; Label: One Little Indian	79	78	—	—	66	—	88	67
McCartney III Imagined (Paul McCartney & various artists)	Released: 16 April 2021 (digital); 23 July 2021 (physical): Label: Capitol	13	—	104	28	—	46	—	19

=== Solo and Wings live albums ===
Title	Album	Peak chart positions										Certifications
Title	Album	UK	BEL	GER	JPN	NLD	NOR	NZ	SWE	SWI	US	Certifications
Wings over America (Wings)	Released: 10 December 1976; Label: Capitol	8	68	9	4	10	7	3	33	—	1	BPI: Gold; MC: Platinum; RIAA: Platinum
Tripping the Live Fantastic	Released: 5 November 1990; Label: Parlophone	17	—	—	12	—	—	—	—	—	26	BPI: Gold
Tripping the Live Fantastic: Highlights!	Released: 12 November 1990; Label: Parlophone	—	—	28	—	35	18	21	27	27	141	RIAA: Platinum
Unplugged (The Official Bootleg)	Released: 20 May 1991; Label: Parlophone	7	—	—	24	42	13	—	20	39	14	
Paul Is Live	Released: 8 November 1993; Label: Parlophone, Capitol, EMI	34	—	44	16	60	—	—	23	—	78	
Back in the U.S.	Released: 11 November 2002; Label: Capitol, Toshiba EMI	—	—	—	4	—	—	—	—	—	8	MC: 3× Platinum; RIAA: 3× Platinum
Back in the World Live	Released: 17 March 2003; Label: Parlophone, EMI	5	4	10	196	16	—	—	12	68	—	BPI: Gold
Good Evening New York City	Released: 17 November 2009; Label: Hear Music, Mercury Records	28	76	54	18	21	8	—	29	—	16	BPI: Silver; RIAA: Gold
Amoeba Gig	Released: 12 July 2019; Label: Capitol	82	149	28	24	83	—	—	—	—	—	
One Hand Clapping (Paul McCartney & Wings)	Released: 14 June 2024; Label: MPL Communications	10	—	4	11	10	—	—	—	11	74	
"—" denotes releases that did not chart or were not released.

=== Compilations ===
Title	Album details	Peak chart positions												Certifications (sales thresholds)
Title	Album details	UK	AUS	AUT	BEL	GER	JPN	NLD	NOR	NZ	SWE	SWI	US	Certifications (sales thresholds)
Wings Greatest (Wings)	Released: 22 November 1978; Label: Parlophone (UK); Capitol (US)	5	8	—	—	18	24	8	20	16	32	—	29	BPI: Platinum; MC: Platinum; RIAA: Platinum
All the Best!	Released: 2 November 1987; Label: Parlophone, EMI (UK); Capitol (US)	2	8	23	—	9	11	10	39	5	7	11	62	BPI: 3× Platinum; ARIA: 2× Platinum; IFPI AUT: Gold; MC: Gold; RIAA: 2× Platinum; SNEP: Gold
Wingspan: Hits and History	Released: 7 May 2001; Label: Parlophone	5	14	28	21	20	13	32	5	13	49	—	2	BPI: Gold; ARIA: Gold; RIAA: 2× Platinum
Pure McCartney	Released: 10 June 2016; Label: Concord Music Group	3	26	14	3	7	4	7	26	15	50	25	15	BPI: Gold
Man on the Run (Music from the Motion Picture Soundtrack)	Released: 27 February 2026; Label: UMe/Capitol	35 (Note: Credited to Paul McCartney and Wings on the UK charts site, the chart position is listed here:)	—	18	19	19	39	38	—	—	16	33	—	
"—" denotes releases that did not chart.

=== Extended plays ===
Title	EP details
Home	Released: 13 November 2020; Label: MPL/Capitol; Format: streaming
Holidays	Released: 20 November 2020; Label: MPL/Capitol; Format: streaming
Family	Released: 27 November 2020; Label: MPL/Capitol; Format: streaming
Love	Released: 4 December 2020; Label: MPL/Capitol; Format: streaming

=== Promotional and limited release albums ===
Year	Album	Notes	US
1980	The McCartney Interview	Commercially released interview album containing McCartney's interview with Musician magazine.	158
1987	Paul Talks (Paul McCartney In Conversation)	Commercially released interview album containing McCartney's interview with John Lennon's half-sister Julianne Baird.	—
1990	Paul McCartney Rocks	A US promotional-only compilation released by Capitol Records in 1990 during McCartney's American tour for Flowers in the Dirt which was designed to promote the uptempo songs in McCartney's solo catalog. Includes the UK B-sides "I Wanna Cry" and "Party Party" as well as the 7" remix of "Figure of Eight".	—
1993	The New World Sampler	Two disc set, contains All the Best! and the new compilation, New World Sampler.	—
1997	Oobu Joobu – Ecology	Tracks from program No. 5 of McCartney's radio series, included as a bonus disc with Flaming Pie only at Best Buy retail stores.	—
2004	Paul McCartney's Glastonbury Groove	A compilation of McCartney's favorite songs.	—
2005	Never Stop Doing What You Love	A compilation available through Fidelity Investments.	—
2005	Paul: The US Tour Presented by Lexus	Two disc set, contains Chaos and Creation in the Backyard and the compilation Motor of Love. (While most of the tracks on Motor of Love have been previously released, the collection did include two new live recordings, "Drive My Car" recorded live at Super Bowl XXXIX and "The Long and Winding Road" recorded live in Anaheim, California in 2002.) The compilation was available through Lexus automobile dealerships.	—
2005	Chaos and Creation in the Backyard Interview Disc	Interview disc available through the Chaos and Creation in the Backyard (Special Edition) album.	—
2007	iTunes Festival: London	Live EP released exclusively for the iTunes Store on 21 August 2007, featuring live performances from McCartney's 5 July 2007 London appearance.	190
2007	Amoeba's Secret	Live EP that features tracks recorded during a secret performance at Amoeba Music in Hollywood, California, on 27 June 2007. The EP was first released in November 2007 in a limited vinyl edition, and in January 2009 on CD and download formats.	119
2010	Live in Los Angeles	British and Irish album released exclusively for The Mail on Sunday newspaper on 10 January 2010, featuring live performances from McCartney's concert at Amoeba Music in Hollywood, California, on 27 June 2007. The album includes the four tracks previously available on the Amoeba's Secret EP ("Only Mama Knows", "C Moon", "That Was Me" and "I Saw Her Standing There") as well as eight other tracks ("Drive My Car", "Dance Tonight", "Black Bird", "Here Today", "Back in the U.S.S.R.", "Get Back", "Hey Jude" and "Lady Madonna").	—
2012	iTunes Live from Capitol Studios	Released exclusively for the iTunes Store on 16 March 2012. Recorded on 10 February live (with video streamed to iTunes) from Capitol Studios in promotion of Kisses on the Bottom, on the day McCartney received his own star on the Hollywood Walk of Fame.	—
2012	Kisses on the Bottom – Complete Kisses	Released exclusively for the iTunes Store on 26 November 2012.	—
2014	The Art of McCartney	A tribute compilation by various artists performing a selection of McCartney's songs.	—

=== Box sets ===
Title	Album details	Peak chart positions	
Title	Album details	GER	US
Paul McCartney: The CD Collection	Released: 1989; Label: UFO; Format: 9-CD	—	—
The Paul McCartney Collection	Released: 7 June 1993; Label: Parlophone; Format: 16-CD	—	—
Wings 1971–73 (Paul McCartney and Wings)	Released: 7 December 2018; Label: Capitol/UMe; Format: 7-CD, 3-DVD, 1-Blu-ray	—	—
McCartney I II III	Released: 5 August 2022; Label: Capitol/UMe; Format: 3-LP/3-CD	19	—
The 7" Singles Box	Released: 2 December 2022; Label: Capitol/UMe; Format: 80-7"	—	126
"—" denotes releases that did not chart.

== Singles ==
=== 1970s ===
Year	Single	Peak chart positions										Certifications	Album
Year	Single	UK	AUS	BEL	CAN	GER	IRE	NLD	NZ	NOR	US	Certifications	Album
1971	"Another Day" b/w "Oh Woman, Oh Why"	2	1	10	4	6	1	3	5	2	5		non-album single
1971	"Uncle Albert/Admiral Halsey" (Note: Not released in the UK.) b/w "Too Many People" (with Linda McCartney)	—	5	—	1	30	—	—	1	—	1	RIAA: Gold	Ram
1971	"The Back Seat of My Car" (Note: Released in the UK only.) b/w "Heart of the Country" (with Linda McCartney)	39	—	—	—	—	—	—	—	—	—		Ram
1971	"Eat at Home" (Note: Not released in the UK or the US.) b/w "Smile Away" (with Linda McCartney)	—	21	13	—	28	—	7	7	6	—		Ram
1972	"Give Ireland Back to the Irish" b/w "Give Ireland Back to the Irish (instrumental version)" (Wings)	16	18	—	46	—	1	—	—	—	21		non-album single
1972	"Mary Had a Little Lamb" b/w "Little Woman Love" (Wings)	9	17	—	41	—	—	13	—	—	28		non-album single
1972	"Hi, Hi, Hi" "C Moon" (Wings)	5	29	5	9	16	18	6	—	3	10		non-album single
1973	"My Love" b/w "The Mess" (Paul McCartney and Wings)	9	4	17	2	43	—	12	3	9	1	RIAA: Gold	Red Rose Speedway
1973	"Live and Let Die" b/w "I Lie Around" (Paul McCartney and Wings)	9 (Note: The single re-entered the chart in November 2008, peaking at number 172. The single again re-entered the chart in June 2012, peaking at number 181.)	5	32	2	31	20	29	—	2	2	BPI: Silver; RIAA: Gold	Live and Let Die
1973	"Helen Wheels" b/w "Country Dreamer" (Paul McCartney and Wings)	12	17	36	4	33	—	23	—	3	10		non-album single (UK & Europe); Band on the Run (US)
1973	"Jet" b/w "Let Me Roll It" "Mamunia" (1st US pressings only) (Paul McCartney and Wings)	7	—	26; 43	5	6	—	10	2	9	7	BPI: Gold	Band on the Run
1973	"Mrs. Vandebilt" (Note: Not released in the UK or the US.) b/w "Bluebird" (Paul McCartney and Wings)	—	41	19; 35	—	33	—	7	9	—	—		Band on the Run
1974	"Band on the Run" b/w "Zoo Gang" (UK) "Nineteen Hundred and Eighty-Five" (US) (Paul McCartney and Wings)	3	—	21	1	22	7	7	1	—	1	BPI: Gold; RIAA: Gold; RMNZ: Platinum	Band on the Run
1974	"Junior's Farm" b/w "Sally G" (Paul McCartney and Wings)	16	12	—	10; 61	—	—	—	—	9	3; 17		non-album single
1974	"Walking in the Park with Eloise" b/w "Bridge On the River Suite" (The Country Hams)	—	—	—	—	—	—	—	—	—	—		non-album single
1975	"Listen to What the Man Said" b/w "Love in Song" (Wings)	6	14	25	1	42	4	18	7	3	1	RIAA: Gold	Venus and Mars
1975	"Letting Go" b/w "You Gave Me the Answer" (Wings)	41	34	—	90	—	—	—	—	—	39		Venus and Mars
1975	"Venus and Mars/Rock Show" b/w "Magneto and Titanium Man" (Wings)	—	34	—	12	—	—	—	—	—	12		Venus and Mars
1976	"Silly Love Songs" b/w "Cook of the House" (Wings)	2	20	—	1	14	1	11	8	9	1	BPI: Silver; RIAA: Gold; RMNZ: Gold	Wings at the Speed of Sound
1976	"Let 'Em In" b/w "Beware My Love" (Wings)	2	65	—	3	29	2	25	13	—	3	BPI: Silver; RIAA: Gold	Wings at the Speed of Sound
1977	"Maybe I'm Amazed" (live) b/w "Soily" (Wings)	28	—	—	9	—	—	40	—	—	10	RMNZ: Gold	Wings over America
1977	"Seaside Woman" b/w "B-side to Seaside" (Suzy And The Red Stripes)	—	—	—	—	—	—	—	—	—	59		non-album single
1977	"Mull of Kintyre" "Girls' School" (Wings)	1	1	1	44; 34	1	1	1	1	2	— 33	BPI: 2× Platinum; BEL: Gold; BVMI: Gold; IRMA: 2× Platinum	non-album single
1978	"With a Little Luck" b/w "Backwards Traveler/Cuff-Link" (Wings)	5	11	21	1	17	3	11	3	6	1	BPI: Silver	London Town
1978	"I've Had Enough" b/w "Deliver Your Children" (Wings)	42	99	27	24	—	11	13; 9	—	—	25		London Town
1978	"London Town" b/w "I'm Carrying" (Wings)	60	—	—	43	—	—	—	—	—	39		London Town
1979	"Goodnight Tonight" b/w "Daytime Nighttime Suffering" (Wings)	5	6	24	2	34	9	24	6	9	5	BPI: Silver; MC: Gold; RIAA: Gold	non-album single
1979	"Old Siam, Sir" (Note: Released in the UK only) b/w "Spin It On" (Wings)	35	—	—	—	—	29	—	—	—	—		Back to the Egg
1979	"Getting Closer" "Baby's Request" b/w "Spin It On" (US) (Wings)	60	57	25	18	—	24	29	—	—	20		Back to the Egg
1979	"Arrow Through Me" (Note: Released in the US only.) b/w "Old Siam, Sir" (Wings)	—	—	—	27	—	—	—	—	—	29		Back to the Egg
1979	"Rockestra Theme" (Note: Released in France only) b/w "Old Siam, Sir" (Wings)	—	—	—	—	—	—	—	—	—	—		Back to the Egg
1979	"Wonderful Christmastime" b/w "Rudolph the Red-Nosed Reggae"	6 (Note: The single re-entered the chart in December 2018, peaking at number 20.)	23	26	—	7	8	10	20	7	26 (Note: The single did not appear on the Hot 100 until December 2018.)	BPI: 2× Platinum; ARIA: Gold; BVMI: Gold; RMNZ: Platinum	non-album single
"—" denotes a title that did not chart, or was not released in that territory.

=== 1980s ===
Year	Single	Peak chart positions										Certifications	Album
Year	Single	UK	AUS	BEL	CAN	GER	IRE	NLD	NZ	NOR	US	Certifications	Album
1980	"Coming Up" "Coming Up (Live at Glasgow)" (Wings) b/w "Lunchbox/Odd Sox"	2	2	18	1	11	3	20	2	2	1	BPI: Silver; RIAA: Gold	McCartney II
1980	"Waterfalls" b/w "Check My Machine"	9	31	—	—	55	4	—	15	9	106		McCartney II
1980	"Temporary Secretary" b/w "Secret Friend"	76	—	—	—	—	—	—	—	—	—		McCartney II
1982	"Ebony and Ivory" (with Stevie Wonder) b/w "Rainclouds" "Ebony and Ivory (solo version)"	1	2	2	1	1	1	3	2	1	1	BPI: Gold; NZ: Gold; RIAA: Gold	Tug of War
1982	"Take It Away" b/w "I'll Give You a Ring" "Dress Me Up as a Robber"	15	18	28	17	46	26	43	30	7	10		Tug of War
1982	"Tug of War" b/w "Get It" (with Carl Perkins)	53	—	—	—	—	—	—	—	—	53		Tug of War
1982	"The Girl Is Mine" (with Michael Jackson) b/w "Can't Get Outta the Rain"	8	4	8	8	53	4	16	3	2	2	NZ: Gold; RIAA: Platinum; RMNZ: Platinum	Thriller
1983	"Say Say Say" (with Michael Jackson) b/w "Ode to a Koala Bear"	2 (Note: The single re-entered the chart in July 2009, peaking at number 124.)	4	16	1	12	3	8	10	1	1	BPI: Silver; ARIA: Gold; MC: Platinum; RIAA: Platinum; SNEP: Gold	Pipes of Peace
1983	"Pipes of Peace" (Note: In the US, "Pipes of Peace" was issued as the B-side, and its British B-side, "So Bad", was issued as the A-side.) "So Bad"	1	36	36	18	43	1	34	—	—	23	BPI: Silver	Pipes of Peace
1984	"No More Lonely Nights" b/w "Silly Love Songs" (remake) "No More Lonely Nights" (playout version)	2	9	28	10	30	2	33	19	—	6	BPI: Silver	Give My Regards to Broad Street
1984	"We All Stand Together" b/w "We All Stand Together (humming version)" (with The Frog Chorus)	3 (Note: The single re-entered the chart in December 1985, peaking at number 32.)	—	12	—	30	3	7	—	—	—	BPI: Gold	non-album single
1984	"Do They Know It's Christmas?" (as part of Band Aid) (spoken message on B-side)	1	1	1	1	1	1	1	1	1	13	BPI: Silver; BVMI: Gold; MC: Platinum; RIAA: Gold	non-album single
1985	"Spies Like Us" b/w "My Carnival" (Wings) "Spies Like Us (alternative mix)" (with Art of Noise)	13	55	26	15	—	8	—	—	—	7		non-album single
1986	"Press" b/w "It's Not True" "Hanglide"	25	47	17	28	53	15	—	—	—	21		Press to Play
1986	"Pretty Little Head" b/w "Write Away" "Angry"	76	—	29	—	—	—	—	—	—	—		Press to Play
1986	"Stranglehold" (Note: Released in North America and Japan only.) b/w "Angry"	—	—	—	90	—	—	—	—	—	81		Press to Play
1986	"Only Love Remains" b/w "Tough on a Tightrope" "Talk More Talk"	34	—	—	95	—	20	—	—	—	—		Press to Play
1987	"Let It Be" b/w "Let It Be (the gospel jam mix)" "Let It Be (mega message mix)" (as part of Ferry Aid)	1	28	3	—	3	2	3	4	1	—	BPI: Gold	non-album single
1987	"Once Upon a Long Ago" (Note: Not released in the US.) b/w "Back on My Feet" "Midnight Special" "Don't Get Around Much Anymore" "Lawdy Miss Clawdy" "Kansas City"	10	58	4	68	13	4	11	—	—	—		All the Best! (UK/Canada pressings)
1989	"Ferry Cross the Mersey" (with the Christians, Holly Johnson, Gerry Marsden and Stock Aitken Waterman) b/w "Abide with Me"	1	45	28	—	5	1	21	—	4	—		non-album single
1989	"My Brave Face" b/w "Flying to My Home" "I'm Gonna Be a Wheel Someday" "Ain't That a Shame"	18	30	16	18	29	6	15	—	4	25		Flowers in the Dirt
1989	"This One" b/w "The First Stone" "I Wanna Cry" "I'm In Love Again" "Good Sign"	18	113	30	60	40	27	31	—	—	94		Flowers in the Dirt
1989	"Figure of Eight" b/w "Où Est le Soleil?" "Loveliest Thing" "Rough Ride" "The Long and Winding Road (remake)"	42	—	—	75	—	25	42	—	—	92		Flowers in the Dirt
"—" denotes a title that did not chart, or was not released in that territory.

=== 1990s ===
Year	Single	Peak chart positions										Certifications	Album
Year	Single	UK	AUS	CAN	GER	IRE	NLD	NOR	POL	SWE	US	Certifications	Album
1990	"Put It There" b/w "Mama's Little Girl" (Wings) "Same Time Next Year"	32	—	28	60	17	82	—	—	—	—		Flowers in the Dirt
1990	"Birthday" (live) b/w "Good Day Sunshine" (live) "P.S. Love Me Do" (live) "Let 'Em In" (live)	29	102	89	—	22	68	—	—	—	—		Tripping the Live Fantastic
1990	"The Long and Winding Road" (live) b/w "C Moon" (live) "Mull of Kintyre" (live) "Put It There" (live)	—	—	—	—	—	54	—	—	—	—		Tripping the Live Fantastic
1990	"All My Trials" (live) (Note: Released in the UK only.) b/w "C Moon" (live)	35	—	—	—	—	—	—	—	—	—		Tripping the Live Fantastic
1992	"Hope of Deliverance" b/w "Big Boys Bickering" "Long Leather Coat" "Kicked Around No More"	18	29	5	3	28	8	4	9	26	83	BVMI: Gold	Off the Ground
1993	"C'Mon People" b/w "I Can't Imagine" "Keep Coming Back to Love" "Down to the River" "Deliverance"	41	132	80	41	—	—	—	36	—	—		Off the Ground
1993	"Off the Ground" b/w "Cosmically Conscious" "Style Style" "Sweet Sweet Memories" "Soggy Noodle"	—	66	37	54	—	—	—	—	—	—		Off the Ground
1993	"Biker Like an Icon" b/w "Midnight Special" (live) "Things We Said Today" (live)	—	—	—	62	—	—	—	—	—	—		Off the Ground
1995	"A Leaf" (featuring Anya Alexeyev)	156	—	—	—	—	—	—	—	—	—		Working Classical
1995	"Come Together (War Child)" (as part of the Smokin' Mojo Filters)	19	—	—	—	—	—	—	—	—	—		Help
1997	"Young Boy" (Note: Not released in the US.) b/w "Looking for You" "Broomstick" "Oobu Joobu (Parts 1 & 2)"	19	60	28	55	—	53	19	28	41	—		Flaming Pie
1997	"The World Tonight" b/w "Used to Be Bad" "Really Love You" "Oobu Joobu (Parts 3 & 4)"	23	—	14	—	—	68	—	40	—	64		Flaming Pie
1997	"Beautiful Night" (Note: Not released in the US.) b/w "Love Come Tumbling Down" "Same Love" "Oobu Joobu (Parts 5 & 6)"	25	—	—	—	—	75	—	—	—	—		Flaming Pie
1999	"No Other Baby" "Brown Eyed Handsome Man" b/w "Fabulous"	42	—	—	—	—	—	—	—	—	—		Run Devil Run
1999	"Vo!ce" (with Heather Mills)	87	—	—	—	—	—	—	—	—	—		non-album single
"—" denotes a title that did not chart, or was not released in that territory.

=== 2000s ===
Year	Single	Peak chart positions										Certifications	Album
Year	Single	UK	BEL	CAN	GER	ITA	JPN	NLD	SPA	SWE	US	Certifications	Album
2001	"From a Lover to a Friend" b/w "Riding into Jaipur"	45	—	6	—	—	92	71	—	—	—		Driving Rain
2001	"Freedom" b/w "From a Lover to a Friend"	—	—	—	—	—	—	—	—	13	97		Driving Rain
2004	"Tropic Island Hum" "We All Stand Together" (with The Frog Chorus)	21	—	—	30	—	—	—	—	—	—		non-album single
2004	"Do They Know It's Christmas?" (as part of Band Aid 20) b/w "Do They Know It's Christmas?" (1984) "Do They Know It's Christmas? (Live Aid)"	1	3	1	7	1	9	3	1	2	—	BPI: 2× Platinum	non-album single
2005	"Sgt. Pepper's Lonely Hearts Club Band" (live) (with U2) b/w "The Long and Winding Road"	— (Note: "Sgt. Pepper's Lonely Hearts Club Band (live)" did not enter the main chart in the United Kingdom but entered the download component chart at number 1.)	—	—	—	—	—	21	—	—	48		Live 8
2005	"Fine Line" b/w "Comfort of Love" "Growing Up Falling Down"	20	—	—	70	23	112	28	20	46	—		Chaos and Creation in the Backyard
2005	"Jenny Wren" b/w "Summer of '59" "I Want You to Fly" "This Loving Game"	22	—	—	—	—	—	58	—	40	—		Chaos and Creation in the Backyard
2007	"Ever Present Past" b/w "House of Wax" "Only Mama Knows" "That Was Me"	85	—	—	—	—	42	—	—	—	110		Memory Almost Full
2007	"Dance Tonight" b/w "Nod Your Head"	26 (Note: The single re-entered the chart in March 2008, peaking at number 151.)	24	—	—	—	3	—	—	—	69		Memory Almost Full
"—" denotes a title that did not chart, or was not released in that territory.

=== 2010s ===
Year	Single	Peak chart positions										Certifications	Album
Year	Single	UK	AUS	BEL	CZE	FRA	IRE	MEX	NLD	POL	US	Certifications	Album
2011	"My Valentine"	—	—	19	2	—	—	—	93	10	—		Kisses on the Bottom
2012	"He Ain't Heavy, He's My Brother" (as part of The Justice Collective)	1	—	—	—	—	4	—	36	—	—	BPI: Gold	non-album single
2013	"Out of Sight" (with The Bloody Beetroots & Youth)	—	—	—	—	97	—	—	—	—	—		Hide
2013	"New"	—	—	12	—	134	—	25	—	32	—		New
2013	"Queenie Eye"	—	—	55	2	—	—	—	—	32	—		New
2014	"Hope for the Future"	—	—	24	—	—	—	—	—	49	—		non-album single
2014	"Only One" (with Kanye West)	28	8	18	34	30	43	27	82	—	35	RIAA: Gold	non-album single
2015	"FourFiveSeconds" (with Rihanna and Kanye West)	3	1	5	2	2	1	10	12	3	4	BPI: 3× Platinum; ARIA: 11× Platinum; BEA: Platinum; BVMI: 3× Gold; RIAA: 4× Platinum; RMNZ: 6× Platinum; SNEP: Gold	non-album single
2015	"All Day" (with Kanye West, Theophilus London and Allan Kingdom)	18	42	37	100	28	52	—	93	—	15	BPI: Silver; RIAA: Platinum; RMNZ: Gold	non-album single
2018	"I Don't Know" "Come On to Me"	— (Note: "Come On to Me" did not enter the main chart in the United Kingdom but entered the download component chart at number 58.)	—	108; 18	1	107; 147	—	42	—	32	—		Egypt Station
2018	"Fuh You"	—	—	7	—	—	—	—	—	—	—		Egypt Station
2019	"Get Enough"	—	—	—	—	—	—	—	—	—	—		Egypt Station – Explorer's Edition
2019	"Home Tonight" "In a Hurry"	—	—	27	—	51	—	—	—	—	—		non-album single
"—" denotes a title that did not chart, or was not released in that territory.

=== 2020s ===
Year	Single	Peak chart positions									Album
Year	Single	UK Digital	UK Sales	BEL	JPN Hot	NZ Hot	TWN	US AC	US AAA	US Rock Digital	Album
2020	"Find My Way"	—	—	37	—	15	7	—	31	—	McCartney III
2021	"The Kiss of Venus" (with Dominic Fike)	—	—	—	—	31	—	—	—	—	McCartney III Imagined
2023	"Say Say Say" (with Kygo and Michael Jackson)	—	—	33	17	38	—	—	—	—	Non-album single
2023	"Let It Be" (with Dolly Parton and Ringo Starr)	—	66	—	—	—	—	—	—	—	Rockstar
2025	"My Valentine" (with Barbra Streisand)	—	—	—	—	—	—	—	—	2	The Secret of Life: Partners, Volume Two
2026	"Days We Left Behind"	17	18	—	8	—	—	22	—	7	The Boys of Dungeon Lane
2026	"Home to Us" (with Ringo Starr)	—	45	—	8	—	—	—	—	—	The Boys of Dungeon Lane
"—" denotes a title that did not chart, or was not released in that territory.

=== Promotional and limited release singles ===
Year	Single	Peak chart positions										Album
Year	Single	UK Air.	BEL	JPN	MEX	POL	RUS	US AC	US AAA	US Dance	US Main. Rock	Album
1971	"Bip Bop" (Wings)	—	45	—	—	—	—	—	—	—	—	Wild Life
1989	"Ou est le Soleil?"	—	—	—	—	—	—	—	—	10	—	Flowers in the Dirt
1990	"We Got Married"	—	—	—	—	—	—	—	—	—	43	Flowers in the Dirt
1991	"The World You're Coming into"	—	—	—	—	—	—	—	—	—	—	Paul McCartney's Liverpool Oratorio
1991	"Save the Child"	—	—	—	—	—	—	—	—	—	—	Paul McCartney's Liverpool Oratorio
1993	"Transpiritual Stomp" (The Fireman)	—	—	—	—	—	—	—	—	—	—	Strawberries Oceans Ships Forest
1998	"Rushes" (The Fireman)	—	—	—	—	—	—	—	—	—	—	Rushes
1998	"Fluid (Nitin Sawhney Remixes)" (The Fireman)	—	—	—	—	—	—	—	—	—	—	Rushes
1999	"Run Devil Run"	—	—	96	—	—	—	—	—	—	—	Run Devil Run
2002	"Your Loving Flame"	—	—	—	—	—	—	19	—	—	—	Driving Rain
2002	"Lonely Road"	—	—	—	—	—	—	—	—	—	—	Driving Rain
2006	"This Never Happened Before"	—	—	—	—	—	—	27	—	—	—	Chaos and Creation in the Backyard
2008	"Sing the Changes" (The Fireman)	—	—	—	—	33	—	—	—	—	—	Electric Arguments
2008	"Heal the Pain" (with George Michael)	—	—	—	—	50	—	—	—	—	—	Twenty Five
2010	"(I Want to) Come Home"	—	—	—	—	—	1	—	—	—	—	non-album single
2014	"Save Us"	—	—	84	—	45	—	—	—	—	—	New
2014	"Appreciate"	—	—	—	40	—	—	—	—	—	—	New
2014	"Early Days"	—	—	75	45	—	—	—	—	—	—	New
2016	"1985" (remix) (Wings with Timo Maas and DJ James Teej)	—	—	—	—	—	—	—	—	—	—	non-album single
2018	"Who Cares"	—	—	—	—	—	—	—	—	—	—	Egypt Station
2018	"Back in Brazil"	—	—	—	—	—	13	—	—	—	—	Egypt Station
2018	"Caesar Rock"	—	—	—	—	—	—	—	36	—	—	Egypt Station
2019	"Nothing for Free" (remix) (with DJ Chris Holmes)	—	—	—	—	—	—	—	—	—	—	Egypt Station
2021	"Slidin'" (remix) (with EOB)	9	—	—	—	—	—	—	—	—	—	McCartney III Imagined
2021	"Pretty Boys" (remix) (with Khruangbin)	—	116	—	—	—	—	—	—	—	—	McCartney III Imagined
2021	"Women and Wives" (remix) (with St. Vincent)	—	—	—	—	—	—	—	—	—	—	McCartney III Imagined
2021	"Deep Down" (remix) (with Blood Orange)	—	—	—	—	—	—	—	—	—	—	McCartney III Imagined
2021	"Seize the Day" (with Phoebe Bridgers)	—	—	—	—	—	—	—	—	—	—	McCartney III Imagined
2021	"Long Tailed Winter Bird" (remix) (with Damon Albarn)	—	—	—	—	—	—	—	—	—	—	McCartney III Imagined
2021	"Lavatory Lil" (with Josh Homme)	—	—	—	—	—	—	—	—	—	—	McCartney III Imagined
2021	"When Winter Comes" (remix) (with Anderson .Paak)	—	—	—	—	—	—	—	—	—	—	McCartney III Imagined
2021	"Deep Deep Feeling" (remix) (with 3D RDN)	—	—	—	—	—	—	—	—	—	—	McCartney III Imagined
2021	"Long Tailed Winter Bird" (remix) (with Idris Elba)	2	—	—	—	—	—	—	—	—	—	McCartney III Imagined
"—" denotes a title that did not chart, or was not released in that territory.

== Other charted songs ==
Year	Song	Peak chart positions										Album
Year	Song	UK	UK Sales	FRA	JPN	POL	US	US AC	US Digital	US Jazz	US Main. Rock	Album
1982	"Ballroom Dancing"	—	—	—	—	—	—	—	—	—	22	Tug of War
1982	"Here Today"	—	—	—	—	—	—	—	—	—	46	Tug of War
1982	"The Pound Is Sinking"	—	—	—	—	—	—	—	—	—	44	Tug of War
1986	"Angry"	—	—	—	—	—	—	—	—	—	44	Press to Play
1988	"Children in Need" (with Spirit of Play)	72	—	—	—	—	—	—	—	—	—	non-album single
1990	"Hey Jude" (live)	—	—	—	—	—	—	—	—	—	41	Knebworth – The Album
2001	"Vanilla Sky"	—	—	—	62	—	—	—	—	—	—	Music from Vanilla Sky
2001	"Driving Rain"	—	—	—	43	—	—	—	—	—	—	Driving Rain
2002	"Hello, Goodbye" (live)	—	—	—	72	—	—	—	—	—	—	Back in the U.S.
2003	"While My Guitar Gently Weeps" (live) (with Eric Clapton)	—	—	—	—	41	—	—	—	—	—	Concert for George
2005	"Really Love You" (remix) b/w "Lalula"	157	—	—	—	—	—	—	—	—	—	Twin Freaks
2005	"The Long and Winding Road" (live)	—	5	—	—	—	112	—	64	—	—	Live 8
2012	"Cut Me Some Slack" (with Dave Grohl, Krist Novoselic and Pat Smear)	—	—	—	—	28	—	—	—	—	—	Sound City: Real to Reel
2012	"The Christmas Song"	—	—	—	—	—	—	25	—	—	—	Kisses on the Bottom
2012	"I'm Gonna Sit Right Down and Write Myself a Letter"	—	—	—	—	—	—	—	—	5	—	Kisses on the Bottom
2012	"Get Yourself Another Fool"	—	—	—	—	—	—	—	—	39	—	Kisses on the Bottom
2012	"Ac-Cent-Tchu-Ate the Positive"	—	—	—	—	—	—	—	—	8	—	Kisses on the Bottom
2012	"Always"	—	—	—	—	—	—	—	—	33	—	Kisses on the Bottom
2012	"The Glory of Love"	—	—	—	—	—	—	—	—	48	—	Kisses on the Bottom
2013	"Everybody Out There"	—	—	—	87	—	—	—	—	—	—	New
2013	"Wonderful Christmastime" (with Straight No Chaser)	—	—	—	20	—	—	12	—	—	—	non-album single
2015	"Say Say Say" (remix) (with Michael Jackson)	—	—	—	—	—	—	47	—	—	—	Pure McCartney
2015	"Love Song to the Earth" (as part of Friends of the Earth)	—	96	64	—	—	—	—	36	—	—	non-album single
"—" denotes a title that did not chart, or was not released in that territory.

== Parlophone (UK / IE) vinyl singles catalogue ==
All Parlophone vinyl singles released in the UK and IE by McCartney, as both a solo artist and as a member of Wings. Original releases only.

Parlophone (UK / IE) vinyl singles catalogue
Year	Cat. no.	Single	Peak chart positions		Album
Year	Cat. no.	Single	UK	IE	Album
1970	—	—	—	—	McCartney
1971	R 5889	"Another Day" / "Oh Woman, Oh Why"	2	1	Non-album single
1971	R 5914	"Back Seat of My Car" / "Heart of the Country"	39	—	Ram
1972	R 5932	"Love Is Strange" / "I Am Your Singer" – (unreleased)	—	—	Wild Life
1972	R 5936	"Give Ireland Back to the Irish" / (Instrumental Version)	16	1	Non-album single
1972	R 5949	"Mary Had a Little Lamb" / "Little Woman Love"	9	—	Non-album single
1972	R 5973	"Hi, Hi, Hi" / "C Moon"	5	18	Non-album single
1973	R 5985	"My Love" / "The Mess"	9	—	Red Rose Speedway
1973	R 5987	"Live and Let Die" / "I Lie Around"	9	—	Live and Let Die
1973	R 5993	"Helen Wheels" / "Country Dreamer"	12	—	Non-album single
1974	R 5996	"Jet" / "Let Me Roll It"	7	—	Band on the Run
1974	R 5997	"Band on the Run" / "Zoo Gang"	3	7	Band on the Run
1974	R 5999	"Junior's Farm" / "Sally G"	16	—	Non-album single
1975	R 6006	"Listen to What the Man Said" / "Love in Song"	6	4	Venus and Mars
1975	R 6008	"Letting Go" / "You Gave Me the Answer"	41	—	Venus and Mars
1975	R 6010	"Venus and Mars"/"Rock Show" / "Magneto and Titanium Man"	—	—	Venus and Mars
1976	R 6014	"Silly Love Songs" / "Cook of the House"	2	1	Wings at the Speed of Sound
1976	R 6015	"Let 'Em In" / "Beware My Love"	2	2	Wings at the Speed of Sound
1977	R 6017	"Maybe I'm Amazed" (live) / "Soily" (live)	28	—	Wings over America
1977	R 6018	"Mull of Kintyre" / "Girls' School"	1	1	Non-album single
1978	R 6019	"With a Little Luck" / "Backwards Traveller"/"Cuff Link"	5	3	London Town
1978	R 6020	"I've Had Enough" / "Deliver Your Children"	42	11	London Town
1978	R 6021	"London Town" / "I'm Carrying"	60	—	London Town
1978	—	—	—	—	Wings Greatest
1979	R 6023	"Goodnight Tonight" / "Daytime Nighttime Suffering"	5	9	Non-album single
1979	R 6026	"Old Siam, Sir" / "Spin It On"	35	29	Back to the Egg
1979	R 6027	"Getting Closer" / "Baby's Request"	60	24	Back to the Egg
1979	R 6029	"Wonderful Christmastime" / "Rudolph the Red-Nosed Reggae" (Instrumental)	6	8	Non-album single
1980	R 6035	"Coming Up" / "Coming Up" (Live at Glasgow) / "Lunch Box/Odd Sox"	2	3	McCartney II
1980	R 6037	"Waterfalls" / "Check My Machine"	9	4	McCartney II
1980	R 6039	"Temporary Secretary" / "Secret Friend" – (12-inch-only B-side release)	—	—	McCartney II
1982	R 6054	"Ebony and Ivory" / "Rainclouds"	1	1	Tug of War
1982	R 6056	"Take It Away" / "I'll Give You a Ring"	15	26	Tug of War
1982	R 6057	"Tug of War" / "Get It"	53	—	Tug of War
1983	R 6062	"Say Say Say" / "Ode to a Koala Bear"	2	3	Pipes of Peace
1983	R 6064	"Pipes of Peace" / "So Bad"	1	1	Pipes of Peace
1984	R 6066	"The Man" / "Blackpool" – (unreleased)	—	—	Pipes of Peace
1984	R 6080	"No More Lonely Nights" (Ballad) / "No More Lonely Nights" (Playout Version)	2	2	Give My Regards to Broad Street
1984	R 6086	"We All Stand Together" / "We All Stand Together" (Humming Version)	3	3	Non-album single
1985	R 6089	"Ballroom Dancing" / "Wanderlust" – (unreleased)	—	—	Give My Regards to Broad Street
1985	R 6118	"Spies Like Us" / "My Carnival"	13	8	Non-album single
1986	R 6133	"Press" / "It's Not True"	25	15	Press to Play
1986	R 6145	"Pretty Little Head" / "Write Away"	76	—	Press to Play
1986	R 6148	"Only Love Remains" / "Tough on a Tightrope"	34	20	Press to Play
1987	R 6170	"Once Upon a Long Ago" / "Back on My Feet"	10	4	All the Best!
1989	R 6213	"My Brave Face" / "Flying to My Home"	18	6	Flowers in the Dirt
1989	R 6223	"This One" / "The First Stone"	18	27	Flowers in the Dirt
1989	R 6235	"Figure of Eight" / "Où est le Soleil?"	42	25	Flowers in the Dirt
1989	R 6238	"Party Party" / "Party Party" (Extended Club Mix) – (12-inch-only B-side release)	—	—	Flowers in the Dirt
1990	R 6246	"Put It There" / "Mama's Little Girl"	32	17	Flowers in the Dirt
1990	R 6271	"Birthday" (live) / "Good Day Sunshine" (live)	29	22	Tripping the Live Fantastic
1990	R 6278	"All My Trials" (live) / "C Moon" (live)	35	—	Tripping the Live Fantastic: Highlights!
1991	—	—	—	—	Unplugged (The Official Bootleg)
1991	—	—	—	—	CHOBA B CCCP
1993	R 6330	"Hope of Deliverance" / "Long Leather Coat"	18	28	Off the Ground
1993	R 6338	"C'Mon People" / "I Can't Imagine"	41	—	Off the Ground
1993	—	—	—	—	Paul Is Live
1997	R 6462	"Young Boy" / "Looking for You"	19	—	Flaming Pie
1997	R 6472	"The World Tonight" / "Used to Be Bad"	23	—	Flaming Pie
1997	R 6489	"Beautiful Night" / "Love Come Tumbling Down"	25	—	Flaming Pie
1999	R 6527	"No Other Baby" / "Brown Eyed Handsome Man" / "Fabulous"	42	—	Run Devil Run
2001	—	—	—	—	Wingspan: Hits and History
2001	R 6567	"From a Lover to a Friend" / "Riding Into Jaipur"	45	—	Driving Rain
2003	—	—	—	—	Back in the World
2004	R 6649	"Tropic Island Hum" / "We All Stand Together"	21	30	Non-album single
2005	R 6673	"Fine Line" / "Growing Up Falling Down"	20	—	Chaos and Creation in the Backyard
2005	R 6678	"Jenny Wren" / "Summer of '59"	22	—	Chaos and Creation in the Backyard
Under Peak chart positions, "—" denotes a recording that did not chart or was not released in that territory.
All Parlophone UK and IE catalogue numbers are identical.

Shading denotes B-side; non-inclusion of chart activity.

== Soundtracks and other appearances ==
Year	Album	Comment
1973	Live and Let Die	The soundtrack album from the James Bond film includes the title song performed by Paul McCartney and Wings, also released as a single.
1981	Concerts for the People of Kampuchea	A live album recorded at the Hammersmith Odeon, London in December 1979 to benefit Cambodian refugees, the album includes three songs performed by Wings and three songs performed by Rockestra.
1985	Twice in a Lifetime	McCartney composed and performed the theme song to this film, "Twice in a Lifetime".
1986	It's a Live-In World	British various artists album to benefit "The Anti-Heroin Project". McCartney composed and performed "Simple as That".
1987	Let It Be	A charity single. McCartney sampled his co-lead vocals from the original "Let It Be" sessions and appeared in the official music video, as part of the Ferry Aid collective.
1987	The Prince's Trust 10th Anniversary Birthday Party	A live album of a various-artists concert recorded to benefit The Prince's Trust. McCartney's contribution to the album was a live version of "Get Back". British copies of the album also contained a bonus single with a live version of McCartney performing "Long Tall Sally" and "I Saw Her Standing There".
1988	Children in Need	A charity CD single which contains two versions of the song. McCartney co-produced and played bass on Version 1; as part of Spirit Of Play.
1989	Ferry Cross the Mersey	A charity CD single for the victims of the Hillsborough disaster. McCartney sang co-lead vocals along with various other Liverpool artists.
1990	Knebworth: The Album	McCartney performed two songs, "Coming Up" and "Hey Jude" on the live album recorded at Knebworth in 1990.
1990	The Last Temptation of Elvis	McCartney performed "It's Now or Never" on this British album of popular artists recording songs from Elvis Presley movies.
1991	For Our Children	A various artists' album of children's songs released by Disney to benefit the Elizabeth Glaser Pediatric AIDS Foundation includes Wings' "Mary Had a Little Lamb", originally released in 1972.
1992	Earthrise: The Rainforest Album	A various artists' album to draw attention to then environment includes McCartney's song, "How Many People", originally from Flowers in the Dirt.
1992	Daumier's Law	A short film produced by McCartney; for which he also wrote, performed and produced the soundtrack.
1994	Recording Artists Against Drunk Driving	R.A.D.D. performed "Drive My Car" to promote a new drinking drive campaign. McCartney sang co-lead vocals and appeared in the official music video.
1994	The Unplugged Collection, Volume One	A various artists' album that includes McCartney performing the Beatles song, "We Can Work It Out".
1995	Hiroshima Sky Is Always Blue	An avant-garde collaboration between Yoko Ono (vocals), McCartney (double bass), Sean Lennon (guitar), Linda McCartney (celesta), and McCartney's children playing various percussions. The piece was broadcast on Japanese public television in memory of the 50th anniversary of the atomic bombing of Hiroshima.
1995	The Help Album	A benefit album for the War Child charity. Contains "Come Together", performed by McCartney on guitar and electric piano; as part of the Smokin' Mojo Filters.
1997	Music for Montserrat	Music for Montserrat was released as a video album, featuring McCartney performing "Yesterday", "Golden Slumbers/Carry That Weight/The End", "Hey Jude" and "Kansas City". European and Japanese VHS edition included a CD single with the song "Hey Jude".
1997	Diana, Princess of Wales: Tribute	A various artists' tribute album for Princess Diana includes McCartney's "Little Willow", a song McCartney had originally written for Ringo Starr's children upon the death of their mother Maureen Starkey and released on Flaming Pie.
1998	Twentieth-Century Blues: The Songs of Noël Coward	A tribute album to Noël Coward, McCartney performs lead vocals on "A Room with a View".
1999	(Available from Linda McCartney Racing Team website)	McCartney wrote and performed the song "Clean Machine" to promote the Linda McCartney Racing Team website.
2000	A Garland for Linda	A tribute album to his late wife Linda McCartney, for which Paul composed the song "Nova".
2000	Maybe Baby	McCartney performed and co-produced a version of the Buddy Holly song "Maybe Baby", the track leads off the soundtrack album.
2001	Good Rockin' Tonight	A tribute album to Elvis Presley's Sun Records sessions includes McCartney's contribution "That's All Right", a new recording that differs from his version on CHOBA B CCCP.
2001	Brand New Boots and Panties: A Tribute to Ian Dury	A tribute album to Ian Dury, it contains McCartney performing lead vocals "I'm Partial to Your Abracadabra".
2001	Music from Vanilla Sky	McCartney writes and performs the Oscar-nominated title song on the soundtrack to the film, Vanilla Sky.
2001	The Concert for New York City	McCartney arranged the benefit concert and performed several songs, four of which were released on a live album: "I'm Down", "Yesterday", "Let It Be" and "Freedom".
2002	A Tribute to the King	A tribute album to Elvis Presley, it contains McCartney performing "All Shook Up", originally from Run Devil Run
2002	Party at the Palace	A live album of the concert recorded for Queen Elizabeth's Golden Jubilee. The album features McCartney on the songs "All You Need Is Love" and "Hey Jude".
2003	Music from the Motion Picture The In-Laws	The soundtrack to the 2003 re-make of the film, The In-Laws includes the previously unreleased McCartney song, "A Love for You", an alternate version of "Live and Let Die", and "I'm Carrying" from London Town.
2003	Concert for George	McCartney performed four songs ("For You Blue", "Something", "All Things Must Pass" and "While My Guitar Gently Weeps") on the live album from the concert honoring George Harrison.
2004	Do They Know It's Christmas?	McCartney played bass on the re-recording of "Do They Know It's Christmas?", as part of the Band Aid 20.
2005	46664: 1 Year On	A various artists EP featuring tracks specially written for Nelson Mandela's Global 46664 initiative. It contains "Whole Life", which McCartney co-wrote and performed with David A. Stewart.
2007	Goin' Home: A Tribute to Fats Domino	McCartney performed lead vocals on "I Want to Walk You Home", with Allen Toussaint on piano, on the tribute album to Fats Domino.
2009	(Download from Meat Free Monday website)	McCartney wrote and performed "Meat Free Monday" for support Meat Free Monday project.
2009	Funny People Soundtrack	The soundtrack album for the Adam Sandler film Funny People features the previously released song "Great Day", originally from Flaming Pie.
2009	(Download from Everybody's Fine Soundtrack)	McCartney wrote and performed the Golden Globe-nominated "(I Want to) Come Home" in the Robert De Niro film Everybody's Fine. The song is only available as a download.
2011	Rare Bird Alert	McCartney performed lead vocals on "Best Love", by Steve Martin and the Steep Canyon Rangers.
2011	Rave On Buddy Holly	McCartney performed two versions of the Buddy Holly song "It's So Easy".
2012	12-12-12: The Concert for Sandy Relief	McCartney performed "Helter Skelter".
2012	Holidays Rule	McCartney performed lead vocals on "The Christmas Song" on this album of popular artists recording Christmas songs.
2012	He Ain't Heavy, He's My Brother	McCartney performed co-lead vocals and lead guitar on the song, as part of The Justice Collective.
2013	Sound City: Real to Reel	McCartney wrote and performed "Cut Me Some Slack" with Dave Grohl, Krist Novoselic, and Pat Smear.
2013	L'Ecume Des Jours: Original Soundtrack	McCartney performed bass on "Mais, Aime La" and "Courses Cloches".
2014	Mood Indigo – Original Motion Picture Soundtrack	McCartney performed bass on "Etienne Charry – Bells Race"
2015	Love Song to the Earth	McCartney performs co-lead and backing vocals on the song, as part of the Friends of the Earth collective.
2016	Love Mojis	McCartney wrote and performed the backing music for the love emoticons by Skype.
2016	Ethel & Ernest: Original Motion Picture Soundtrack	McCartney wrote and performed "In the Blink of an Eye" on the soundtrack of the film, Ethel & Ernest.
2017	BBC Radio 2 The Piano Room	McCartney performed "Lady Madonna" from his 2005 BBC appearance on Sold On Song.
2017	Holidays Rule Vol.2	McCartney performed an acapella version of "Wonderful Christmastime", with Jimmy Fallon and The Roots.
2019	Live 8	A live album aasembled from the 2005 concerts features McCartney's performances of "Sgt. Pepper's Lonely Hearts Club Band" (with U2), "Get Back", "Drive My Car" (with George Michael), "Helter Skelter", "The Long and Winding Road" and an ending of "Hey Jude"
2019	Ballywonderland	A tribute album to guitarist Henry McCullough. McCartney played bass on "Long Live Rock & Roll", as part of the Henry McCullough's Fusiliers.
2020	One World: Together at Home	McCartney performed "Lady Madonna" on electric piano, supporting the world during the COVID-19 pandemic.
2020	Round Midnight Preserves	McCartney performed "When the Saints Go Marching In" on trumpet, backed by the Preservation Hall Jazz Band.
2021	Watch the Sound with Mark Ronson (Apple TV+ Original Series Soundtrack)	The soundtrack of the documentary series Watch the Sound with Mark Ronson, which features McCartney on two episodes. It contains "I Know the Time (Is Calling)", featuring McCartney and Gary Numan. McCartney co-composed the song.
2021	Macca To Mecca! Live at the Cavern Club, Liverpool	Live album by Steve Van Zandt, McCartney performed "I Saw Her Standing There" with him.
2025	Is This What We Want?	Silent album by various artists protesting the use of unlicensed copyrighted work to train artificial intelligence. McCartney contributed with a silent track called "Bonus Track", only present in the vinyl version of the album.

== Collaborations ==
Year	Album	Collaborator	Comment
1982	Thriller	Michael Jackson	Contains "The Girl Is Mine", a duet by Jackson and McCartney.
1988	Water from the Wells of Home	Johnny Cash	Contains "New Moon over Jamaica", a duet by Cash and McCartney. McCartney played bass, co-composed and produced the song.
1996	Go Cat Go!	Carl Perkins	Contains "My Old Friend", a duet by Perkins and McCartney; McCartney produced the track and played guitar, bass, piano and drums.
1998	Little Children	Peter Kirtley Band	A charity CD single by Peter Kirtley Band featuring Paul McCartney. McCartney sang co-lead vocals and performed spoken words on Version 2 of the song.
1999	Vo!ce	Heather Mills	A charity CD single by Heather Mills featuring Paul McCartney. McCartney co-composed the song, played guitar and sang backing vocals.
2001	Love & Faith & Inspiration	Lindsay Pagano	Contains a version of the McCartney composed "So Bad" by Pagano, with co-lead vocals by McCartney.
2002	Together	Lulu	Contains "Inside Thing (Let 'Em In)", a duet by Lulu and McCartney. McCartney's vocals were sampled from the song "Let 'Em In".
2004	Gettin' in Over My Head	Brian Wilson	Contains "A Friend Like You", a duet by Wilson and McCartney who also played acoustic guitar.
2006	Duets: An American Classic	Tony Bennett	Contains "The Very Thought of You", a duet by Bennett and McCartney.
2006	Givin' It Up	George Benson and Al Jarreau	Contains "Bring It On Home to Me" with lead vocals by McCartney, George Benson and Al Jarreau.
2006	Twenty Five	George Michael	Contains "Heal the Pain", a duet by Michael and McCartney.
2008	London Undersound	Nitin Sawhney	Contains "My Soul", co-composed by McCartney; with McCartney on lead vocals, acoustic guitar, electric guitar and bass.
2009	A Sideman's Journey	Klaus Voormann	McCartney sang lead vocals, played acoustic and electric guitar, piano, organ and drums on "I'm in Love Again".
2010	Y Not	Ringo Starr	Contains "Walk With You" and "Peace Dream". McCartney played bass on both tracks and sang backing vocals on "Walk With You".
2011	Live at Shea Stadium	Billy Joel	Guest appearance by McCartney, who sang "I Saw Her Standing There" and "Let It Be" with Billy Joel, and appeared in Joel's documentary film The Last Play At Shea.
2012	Blow Your Pants Off	Jimmy Fallon	Guest appearance by McCartney, who sang "Scrambled Eggs" with Jimmy Fallon to the tune of "Yesterday".
2013	Old Sock	Eric Clapton	McCartney sang co-lead vocals and played double bass on the song "All of Me".
2013	Hide	The Bloody Beetroots	McCartney sang lead vocals on "Out of Sight" (a cover of McCartney's "Nothing Too Much Just Out Of Sight") and appeared in the official music video.
2013	Under the Influence	Straight No Chaser	The "Holiday Edition" of the album contains an a cappella version of "Wonderful Christmastime", sung by McCartney and Straight No Chaser. McCartney's vocals were sampled from the original recording.
2014	"Only One"	Kanye West	A song by Kanye West featuring Paul McCartney. McCartney sang backing vocals and played electric piano.
2015	"FourFiveSeconds"	Rihanna and Kanye West	A song by Rihanna, Kanye West and Paul McCartney. McCartney co-composed, co-produced and played acoustic guitar on the track.
2015	"All Day"	Kanye West, Theophilus London and Allan Kingdom	A song by Kanye West featuring Theophilus London, Allan Kingdom and Paul McCartney. The song sampled the then-unreleased McCartney song "When the Wind is Blowing" and McCartney sang co-lead vocals.
2015	Hollywood Vampires	Hollywood Vampires	Contains a version of the McCartney composed "Come and Get It". McCartney sang lead vocals, played bass and piano.
2023	Rockstar	Dolly Parton	Contains a version of the McCartney composed "Let It Be" by Parton; featuring him and Ringo Starr. McCartney sang co-lead vocals and played piano. Ringo Starr played drums.
2025	The Secret of Life: Partners, Volume Two	Barbra Streisand	Contains a cover of McCartney's song "My Valentine", recorded as a duet.
2025	The End Continues	Spinal Tap	Contains a version of "Cups and Cakes" with McCartney on lead vocals.

== As composer, invited musician or producer ==
Year	Subject	Collaborator	Comment
1963	"I'll Be on My Way"	Billy J. Kramer and the Dakotas	Composer
1963	"Tip of My Tongue"	Tommy Quickly	Composer
1963	"Love of the Loved"	Cilla Black	Composer
1963	"I'll Keep You Satisfied"	Billy J. Kramer and the Dakotas	Composer
1964	"From a Window"	Billy J. Kramer and the Dakotas	Composer and backing vocals
1964	"It's for You"	Cilla Black	Composer and piano
1964	"I Knew Right Away"	Alma Cogan	Tambourine (uncredited)
1964	"One and One Is Two"	The Strangers with Mike Shannon	Composer
1964	"A World Without Love"	Peter and Gordon	Composer
1964	"Nobody I Know"	Peter and Gordon	Composer
1964	"Like Dreamers Do"	The Applejacks	Composer
1964	"I Don't Want to See You Again"	Peter and Gordon	Composer
1965	"You've Got to Hide Your Love Away"	The Silkie	Guitar
1965	"That Means a Lot"	P.J. Proby	Composer
1966	"Woman"	Peter and Gordon	Composer (credited as Bernard Webb)
1966	"Got to Get You into My Life"	Cliff Bennett and the Rebel Rousers	Producer and composer
1966	"Mellow Yellow"	Donovan	McCartney can be heard as a party reveler (uncredited)
1966	"From Head to Toe"	The Escorts	Tambourine
1967	Smiley Smile	The Beach Boys	Celery on "Vegetables"
1967	"We Love You"	The Rolling Stones	Backing vocals
1967	"Catcall"	Chris Barber	Composer
1968	"And the Sun Will Shine"/"The Dog Presides"	Paul Jones	Drums
1968	"Step Inside Love"	Cilla Black	Composer
1968	Tadpoles	Bonzo Dog Doo Dah Band	Co-producer on "I'm the Urban Spaceman". The song was produced by McCartney and Gus Dudgeon (collectively credited as Apollo C. Vermouth).
1968	"Thingumybob"/"Yellow Submarine"	Black Dyke Mills Band	Producer and composer
1968	"Those Were the Days"	Mary Hopkin	Producer
1968	McGough & McGear	Roger McGough and Mike McGear	An album by McCartney's brother Michael and Roger McGough. McCartney co-produced the album and backing vocals on "So Much".
1968	James Taylor	James Taylor	Bass on "Carolina in My Mind"
1969	Post Card	Mary Hopkin	Producer on the whole album. Acoustic guitar on "Lord of the Reedy River" and "Voyage of the Moon". Bass on "Happiness Runs (Pebble and the Man)".
1969	"Penina"	Jotta Herre	Composer
1969	"Rosetta"	The Fourmost	Producer and piano
1969	"Lontano Dagli Occhi"/"The Game"	Mary Hopkin	Producer
1969	"Goodbye"/"Sparrow"	Mary Hopkin	Producer, composer, acoustic guitar, ukulele, bass, piano, drums and percussion on "Goodbye". Maracas on "Sparrow".
1969	"Thumbin' A Ride"	Jackie Lomax	Co-producer and drums
1969	Is This What You Want?	Jackie Lomax	Bass on "Sour Milk Sea" and "New Day". Co-producer on "Going Back to Liverpool", released as a bonus track in 1991.
1969	Brave New World	Steve Miller Band	Bass, drums and backing vocals on "My Dark Hour". Backing vocals on "Celebration Song" (credited as Paul Ramon).
1970	Magic Christian Music	Badfinger	Producer, composer and tambourine on "Come and Get It". Co-producer and piano on "Rock of All Ages". Producer on "Carry On Till Tomorrow".
1970	Sentimental Journey	Ringo Starr	Arranger on "Stardust"
1970	"Que Sera, Sera (Whatever Will Be, Will Be)"/"Fields of St. Etienne"	Mary Hopkin	Producer on "Que Sera, Sera (Whatever Will Be, Will Be)", bass and acoustic guitar on "Fields of St. Etienne".
1972	Woman	Mike McGear	An album by McCartney's brother Michael. McCartney co-composed "Bored as Butterscotch" (credited as Friend).
1972	No Secrets	Carly Simon	Backing vocals on "Night Owl"
1973	Ringo	Ringo Starr	Composer, arranger, piano, synthesizer and backing vocals on "Six O'Clock". Kazoo (credited as "mouth sax") on "You're Sixteen".
1974	Pass On This Side	Thornton, Fradkin & Unger And Big Band	Bass and backing vocals on "God Bless California"
1974	"Liverpool Lou"/"Ten Years After on Strawberry Jam"	The Scaffold	A single by McCartney's brother Michael and his band. McCartney produced "Liverpool Lou" and produced, composed, played bass and keyboards on "Ten Years After on Strawberry Jam". Both tracks were performed by an uncredited Wings.
1974	Walking Man	James Taylor	Backing vocals on "Rock 'n' Roll Is Music Now"
1974	"4th of July"	John Christie	Composer
1974	I Survive	Adam Faith	Synthesizer on "Change", "Goodbye" and "Never Say Goodbye". Backing vocals on "Star Song".
1974	"Sweet Baby"	Mike McGear	A single by McCartney's brother Michael. McCartney produced and co-composed the song.
1974	McGear	Mike McGear	An album by McCartney's brother Michael, with Wings as his backing band. McCartney produced the album, composed or co-composed most of the tracks, played guitars, bass, piano, keyboards, synthesizers and sang backing vocals (uncredited as musician). The album was reissued in 2019 with some bonus tracks including "Blowin' in the Bay" and "Let's Turn the Radio On", both with McCartney on drums.
1974	Let's Love	Peggy Lee	Producer and composer on the title track "Let's Love"
1974	Smiler	Rod Stewart	Composer and backing vocals on "Mine For Me"
1975	"Dance the Do"	Mike McGear	A single by McCartney's brother Michael. McCartney produced and co-composed the song.
1976	Ringo's Rotogravure	Ringo Starr	Composer and backing vocals on "Pure Gold"
1977	Bullinamingvase	Roy Harper	Backing vocals on "One of Those Days in England"
1977	Holly Days	Denny Laine	Produced by McCartney, who also played most of the instruments and sang backing vocals on the album.
1977	One of the Boys	Roger Daltrey	Composer on "Giddy"
1978	Live on the Queen Mary	Professor Longhair	Live album by Professor Longhair backed by The Meters, produced by McCartney.
1978	Freddie Starr	Freddie Starr	Backing vocals on "You've Lost that Lovin' Feelin'"
1979	Freeze Frame	Godley & Creme	Backing vocals on "Get Well Soon"
1980	Japanese Tears	Denny Laine	"Send Me the Heart" and "Weep for Love" were performed by Wings, with McCartney on bass. McCartney also co-composed and sang backing vocals on "Send Me the Heart".
1981	Somewhere in England	George Harrison	Backing vocals on "All Those Years Ago"
1981	Stop and Smell the Roses	Ringo Starr	Producer, bass, piano and backing vocals on "Private Property", "Attention" and "Sure To Fall". Composer on "Private Property" and "Attention". The album was reissued in 1994 with some bonus tracks including "You Can't Fight Lightning"; McCartney produced the track and played drums.
1982	Standard Time	Laurence Juber	"Maisie" was performed by Wings, with McCartney on bass.
1983	The Honorary Consul	John Williams (guitarist)	The main theme of this film was composed by McCartney
1984	Print Out	Ivory	Composer on "Runaway" and "Freedom Land"
1984	EB 84	The Everly Brothers	Composer and guitar on "On the Wings of a Nightingale"
1988	"T-Shirt"	The Crickets	Producer, piano and backing vocals
1989	Spike	Elvis Costello	Co-composer on "Veronica" and "Pads, Paws, and Claws". Bass on "Veronica" and "...This Town...".
1991	Mighty Like A Rose	Elvis Costello	Co-composer on "So Like Candy" and "Playboy to a Man"
1992	...Meanwhile	10cc	Co-composer on "Don't Break the Promises"
1993	Love's Alright	Eddie Murphy	Backing vocals on "Yeah"
1995	Mirror, Mirror	10cc	Co-composer and electric guitar on "Yvonne's the One". Strings, electric piano, frogs, crickets and percussion on "Code of Silence".
1996	"The Ballad of the Skeletons"	Allen Ginsberg	Co-composer, electric guitar, organ, drums and maracas.
1996	All This Useless Beauty	Elvis Costello	Co-composer on "Shallow Grave". The album was re-released in 2001 with a bonus disc which contains "That Day Is Done" (with The Fairfield Four), also co-composed by McCartney.
1998	Wide Prairie	Linda McCartney	An album by McCartney's wife Linda. McCartney co-composed, produced (or co-produced) nearly all the tracks. McCartney also played many instruments on the album and some tracks were performed by Wings.
1998	Vertical Man	Ringo Starr	Bass and backing vocals on "La De Da", "I Was Walking" and "What in the... World". McCartney also appeared in the official music video of "La De Da".
2000	Godzology	Les Fradkin	Bass and backing vocals on "Black Gipsy"
2001	Rings Around the World	Super Furry Animals	Celery on "Receptacle for the Respectable"
2005	Undressing Underwater	Rusty Anderson	Electric guitar, bass and backing vocals on "Hurt Myself".
2005	A Time to Love	Stevie Wonder	Acoustic and electric guitar on the title track "A Time to Love"
2009	Roadsinger	Yusuf Islam	Backing vocals on "Boots and Sand"
2010	Wreckorder	Fran Healy	Bass on "As It Comes"
2010	Y Not	Ringo Starr	Bass on "Peace Dream" and backing vocals on "Walk With You"
2010	Available Light	James McCartney	An E.P. by McCartney's son James. McCartney co-produced the E.P.
2011	Close at Hand	James McCartney	An E.P. by McCartney's son James. McCartney co-produced the E.P.
2013	Me	James McCartney	An album by McCartney's son James. McCartney played guitar, piano, drums and sang backing vocals.
2014	Destiny	Michael Salvatori; C. Paul Johnson; Martin O'Donnell	McCartney co-scored this video game
2015	Wallflower	Diana Krall	Composer on "If I Take You Home Tonight"
2015	Strange Time	Chip Z'Nuff	Co-composer on "The Pain Is All on You"
2016	Blonde	Frank Ocean	Co-composer on "White Ferrari", as the song contains musical elements of "Here, There and Everywhere".
2016	Yesterday's Sunshine	Grapefruit	Co-producer on "Lullaby"
2017	Give More Love	Ringo Starr	Backing vocals on "We're on the Road Again" and bass on "Show Me the Way"
2017	Concrete and Gold	Foo Fighters	Drums on "Sunday Rain"
2017	Rest	Charlotte Gainsbourg	Composer, electric guitar, piano and additional drums on "Songbird in a Cage".
2019	Better In Blak	Thelma Plum	Co-composer on "Made For You"
2019	What's My Name	Ringo Starr	Backing vocals and bass on "Grow Old With Me"
2020	Zoom In	Ringo Starr	Backing vocals on "Here's to the Nights"
2022	Higher	Michael Bublé	Producer and composer on "My Valentine"
2022	Home	The Umoza Music Project	Bass on the title track "Home"
2022	"Ever the Optimist"	Exploring Birdsong	Co-composer (uncredited)
2023	Rewind Forward	Ringo Starr	Producer, composer, electric guitars, bass, keyboards, zither and backing vocals on "Feeling the Sunlight".
2023	Hackney Diamonds	The Rolling Stones	Bass on "Bite My Head Off"
2023	Equal Strain on All Parts	Jimmy Buffett	Bass on "My Gummie Just Kicked In"
2024	Cowboy Carter	Beyoncé	Co-producer, acoustic guitar and foot tapping on "Blackbiird".
2024	Beautiful Nothing	James McCartney	An album by McCartney's son James. McCartney co-produced "Intro", "Beautiful" and co-composed "Primrose Hill". He played bass on "I'm Yours", guitar, harmonium and shaker on "Primrose Hill", spinet on "Nothing", harmonica and ukulele on "Circle Game", recorder on "Old Man". McCartney also sang backing vocals on "Old Man".
2026	Foreign Tongues	The Rolling Stones	Bass on "Covered In You"

== See also ==
- The Beatles albums discography
- The Beatles singles discography
- Wings discography

== Works cited ==
- Carlin, Peter Ames (2009). Paul McCartney: A Life. New York: Simon & Schuster. ISBN 978-1-416562-09-2.
