= McCartney I II III =

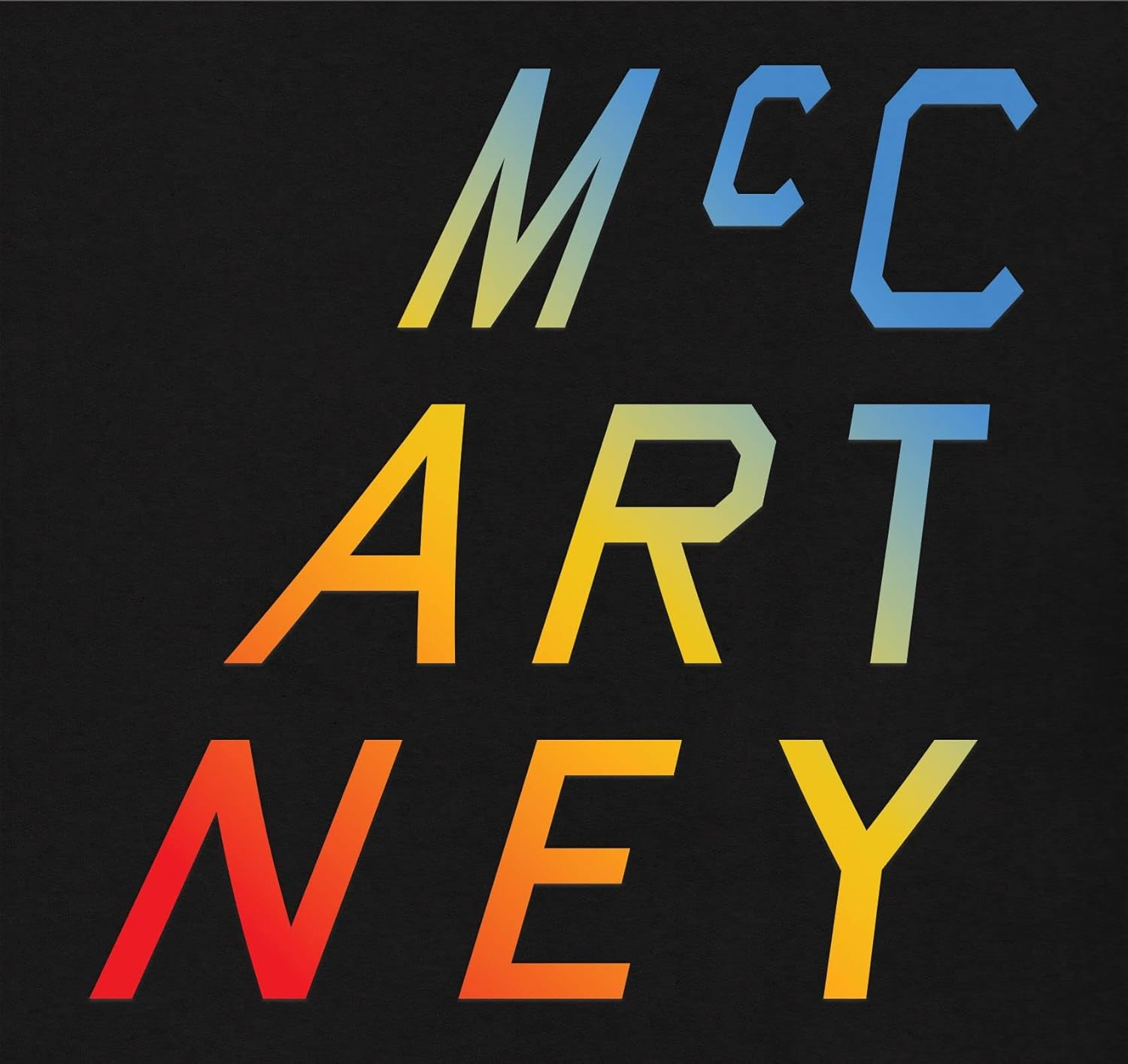

Box set by Paul McCartney
- Released: 5 August 2022
- Recorded: 1 December 1969 – 25 February 1970 (McCartney); August – 7 September 1979 (McCartney II); Early 2020, 1992 ("When Winter Comes"), January 2016 – February 2018 (part of "Slidin'") (McCartney III)
- Genres: Rock; new wave; synth-pop; electronica; lo-fi
- Length: 117:09
- Labels: MPL; Capitol
- Producer: Paul McCartney

Paul McCartney chronology
McCartney III Imagined (2021)	McCartney I II III (2022)	The 7" Singles Box (2022)

McCartney I II III is a box set by English musician Paul McCartney. Released on 5 August 2022, it contains McCartney's three eponymous solo albums: McCartney (1970), McCartney II (1980), and McCartney III (2020). The release was made available on CD and both limited edition colored and standard black vinyl. All three albums feature McCartney on all instruments and vocals, with the exception of harmony vocals provided by Linda McCartney on McCartney, and the track "Slidin'" from McCartney III, which features drums and guitar performed by members of his backing band. Additionally, the three albums were primarily recorded at McCartney's home studios, with the first recorded in London, the second in Scotland and the third in Sussex.

== Content ==
All three albums included in the box set are noted for their carefree and sometimes experimental nature, due to the circumstances under which they were recorded. The majority of the material on each album was recorded in McCartney's home studio, with him performing all instrumentation and vocals aside from the above exceptions. McCartney consists mainly of acoustic tracks, some of which are instrumentals, and contains "Maybe I'm Amazed", one of McCartney's most popular solo songs despite the studio version never receiving release as a single. The album was subject to harsh criticism at the time of its release but attained a much more positive reputation in later decades, being noted as an early example of lo-fi music.

The experimental McCartney II consisted of recordings made in June 1979, once again at McCartney's home in Scotland. The album spawned the successful single "Coming Up", which reached number two in the UK. A live version of the track, recorded in 1979 with Wings, was included as a B-side and was more successful than the studio recording in the US, reaching the top of the chart. Two further singles were released, the minimalist "Waterfalls" and the experimental "Temporary Secretary", with the latter being released exclusively as a 12" single. "Waterfalls" became a top 10 hit in McCartney's home country, reaching number 9, but became his first single to miss the Billboard Hot 100 completely. "Temporary Secretary" was restricted to only 25,000 copies and did not chart in either the US or UK.

McCartney II featured prominent use of synthesizers on many tracks and a more experimental sound than McCartney's previous releases. Like its predecessor, it received negative reviews upon release but has been viewed more highly in recent years, being considered by some as a precursor to popular genres of the 1980s such as synthpop and new wave.

The third album in the set, McCartney III, was released in December 2020, forty years after its predecessor. Aside from "When Winter Comes", an acoustic track dating back to 1992, the album was recorded at McCartney's home studio in Sussex during the COVID-19 pandemic. The album's sound is similar to the material McCartney recorded with his band. "Find My Way" was released as the album's lead single the same day as the album's release. Unlike his previous two self-titled albums, McCartney III received positive reviews upon its release. A "reimagined" version of the album, entitled McCartney III Imagined, was released the following year and features covers and remixes of the album's tracks featuring Beck, EOB, Dominic Fike and more.

== Reception ==
McCartney I II III received generally positive reviews from critics. The Quietus named the box set "reissue of the week", lauding the playful atmosphere of each album, and Spectrum Culture stated the albums "capture a celebrity reveling in artistic freedom."

== Track listings ==
All songs written by Paul McCartney.

=== McCartney ===
Side one

1. "The Lovely Linda" – 0:43
2. "That Would Be Something" – 2:38
3. "Valentine Day" – 1:39
4. "Every Night" – 2:31
5. "Hot as Sun/Glasses" – 2:07
6. "Junk" – 1:54
7. "Man We Was Lonely" – 2:56

Side two

1. "Oo You" – 2:48
2. "Momma Miss America" – 4:04
3. "Teddy Boy" – 2:22
4. "Singalong Junk" – 2:34
5. "Maybe I'm Amazed" – 3:53
6. "Kreen-Akrore" – 4:15

=== McCartney II ===
Side one

1. "Coming Up" – 3:53
2. "Temporary Secretary" – 3:14
3. "On the Way" – 3:38
4. "Waterfalls" – 4:43
5. "Nobody Knows" – 2:52

Side two

1. "Front Parlour" – 3:32
2. "Summer's Day Song" – 3:25
3. "Frozen Jap" – 3:40
4. "Bogey Music" – 3:27
5. "Darkroom" – 2:20
6. "One of These Days" – 3:35

=== McCartney III ===
Side one

1. "Long Tailed Winter Bird" – 5:16
2. "Find My Way" – 3:54
3. "Pretty Boys" – 3:00
4. "Women and Wives" – 2:52
5. "Lavatory Lil" – 2:22
6. "Slidin'" – 3:23

Side two

1. "Deep Deep Feeling" – 8:25
2. "The Kiss of Venus" – 3:06
3. "Seize the Day" – 3:20
4. "Deep Down" – 5:52
5. "Winter Bird/When Winter Comes" – 3:12

== Personnel ==
McCartney:

- Paul McCartney – vocals, all instrumentation
- Linda McCartney – harmony vocals

McCartney II:

- Paul McCartney – all vocals and instrumentation

McCartney III:

- Paul McCartney – all vocals and instrumentation (except where noted)
- Rusty Anderson – electric guitar (side one, track 6)
- Abe Laboriel Jr. – drums (side one, track 6)
