= Kisses on the Bottom =

- Cover photo by Mary McCartney

Studio album by Paul McCartney
- Released: 6 February 2012
- Recorded: March–November 2011
- Studios: Capitol, Hollywood; Avatar, New York City
- Genres: Jazz, traditional pop
- Length: 49:19
- Label: Hear Music
- Producer: Tommy LiPuma

Paul McCartney chronology
| Ocean's Kingdom (2011) | Kisses on the Bottom (2012) | New (2013) |

Paul McCartney studio album chronology
| Memory Almost Full (2007) | Kisses on the Bottom (2012) | New (2013) |

Singles from Kisses on the Bottom
- 1. "My Valentine" Released: 20 December 2011

Kisses on the Bottom is the sixteenth solo studio album by Paul McCartney, consisting primarily of covers of traditional pop music and jazz, ranging from the 1920s to the 1950s. Released in February 2012 on Starbucks' Hear Music label, it was McCartney's first studio album since Memory Almost Full in 2007. The album was produced by Tommy LiPuma and includes just two original compositions by McCartney: "My Valentine" and "Only Our Hearts". The former features jazz drummer Karriem Riggins. Kisses on the Bottom peaked at number 3 on the UK Albums Chart and number 5 on the US Billboard 200, while also topping Billboard magazine's Jazz Albums chart.

In addition to the standard release, the album was made available in a "Deluxe" edition, which added the songs "Baby's Request"—written by McCartney and originally recorded by Wings for their 1979 album Back to the Egg—and another cover, "My One and Only Love". In November 2012, an expanded edition of Kisses on the Bottom, subtitled Complete Kisses, was released exclusively on the iTunes store. The latter release features the fourteen-track album with four bonus tracks, and the complete iTunes Live from Capitol Studios performance.

== History and recording ==
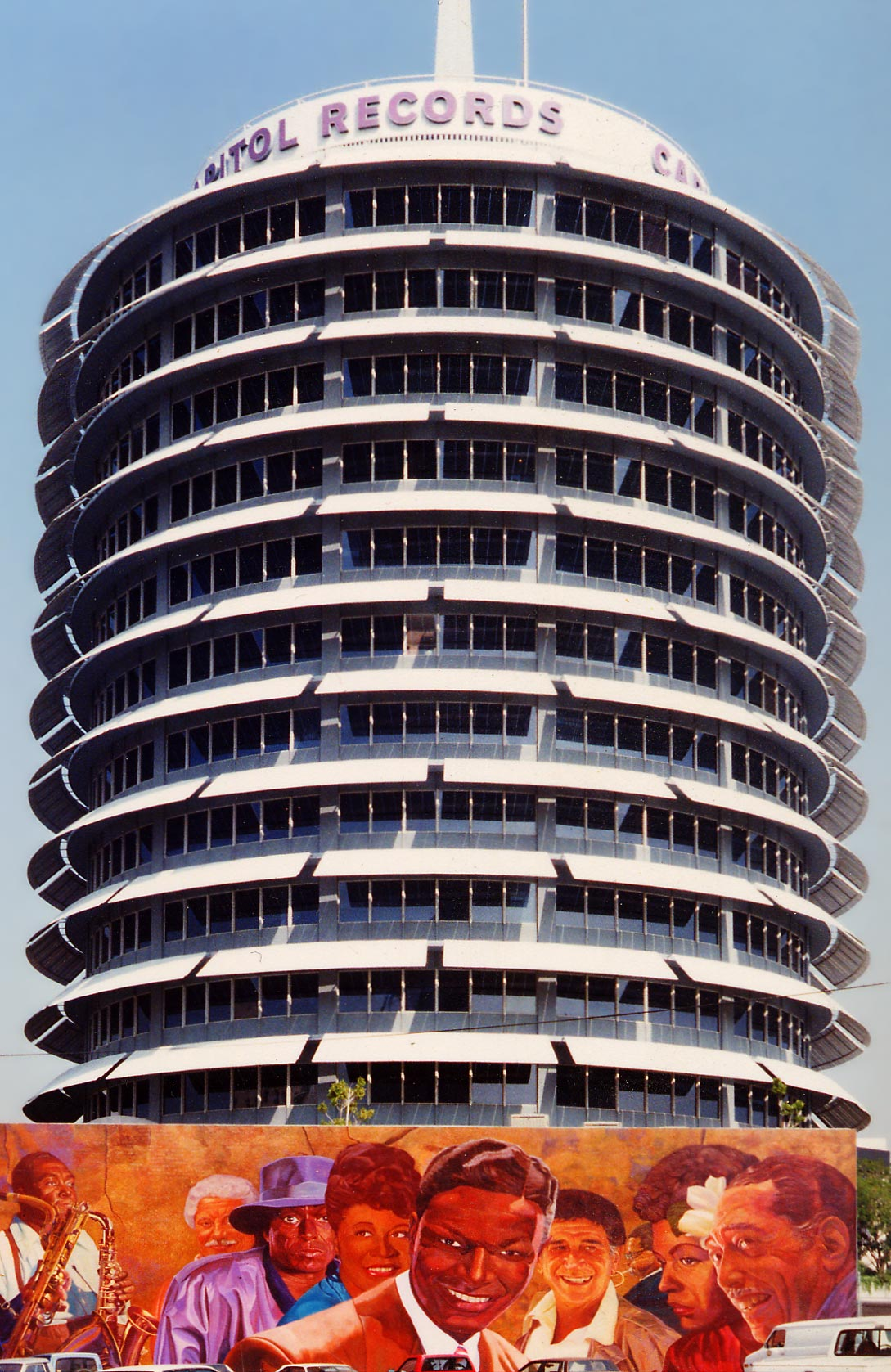
Recording took place at the Capitol Records Building

A year prior to recording the album, jazz producer Tommy LiPuma and an unnamed keyboardist tried out some ideas for five days with Paul McCartney at McCartney's home studio in East Sussex. Featuring just vocals and piano, the trio "put about 15–20 songs on tape", to see what tracks would work. Around this time, an unknown McCartney original was recorded, with the help of engineer Geoff Emerick. The songs that McCartney would work on were voted upon democratically; McCartney commented, "I pulled up some [songs] from my memories, when I was a kid and we had family sing-songs, which was the original inspiration for the whole idea, I said to Tom, 'Let's look at these ones. This is the kind of era I want to look at.' Tommy himself suggested some; a girl in my office; [...] Diana [Krall] suggested some. Then I played Tommy a couple that I'd written, and he said, 'Whoa, that's a great idea,' so we selected a couple of those. [...] We all made suggestions, and we took all those suggestions to the studio."

An alternate musical arrangement of "My Valentine" was recorded, along with remakes of earlier McCartney songs: "Baby's Request" and "Goodnight Princess". The version of "My Valentine" recorded during the album sessions, as well as the original 1983 vocal version, remain unreleased. "My Valentine" was arranged by Alan Broadbent, who recalled his work with McCartney in the book Paul McCartney: Recording Sessions (1969–2013), speaking about the ideas McCartney offered him for the arrangement. Some songs were from McCartney's childhood, in which his father, Jim, would often be playing on the family piano. Most of the songs were played based on the sheet music, with LiPuma commenting that "We'd have somebody write out a chord sheet for us, and then we went in and figured it out on the date". LiPuma added that McCartney wasn't unfamiliar with the group's way of recording, and related that McCartney said, "I love this. It reminds me of the way we used to do the Beatles. John [Lennon] and I would write a song, we'd have a date booked at Abbey Road, and neither George Martin, George Harrison or Ringo [Starr] knew what the songs were about. They'd work it out right there in the room".

The album was recorded throughout 2011 at Capitol Studios and Avatar Studios, with overdubs added at Westlake Recording Studios in Los Angeles, Hog Hill Mill Studio in Icklesham and Abbey Road Studios in London.

The album's title comes from the lead track "I'm Gonna Sit Right Down and Write Myself a Letter", originally a hit for Fats Waller in 1935, in which the pretend letter contains sweet words and wishes, with many "kisses on the bottom" of the letter.

In the liner notes for the album, McCartney commented, "I worked with Diana Krall, and great jazz musicians like John Clayton. This is an album very tender, very intimate. This is an album you listen to at home after work, with a glass of wine or a cup of tea." The disc was helmed by LiPuma, who had previously worked with Miles Davis and Barbra Streisand, among others. The album is mostly standards, with two originals written in the same style ("My Valentine" and "Only Our Hearts"). The first song released from the album was "My Valentine", composed by McCartney and featuring Eric Clapton on guitar. Stevie Wonder plays harmonica on "Only Our Hearts". McCartney plays acoustic guitar on "Get Yourself Another Fool" and "The Inch Worm", but otherwise contributes only vocals. Assistant engineer Brian Montgomery told author Luca Perasi that McCartney "played acoustic guitar during the basic tracks of a few songs (I believe three or four of them)." The vocals were recorded "using a Neumann U47 tube microphone and a Summit TLA100 compressor."

== Release and promotion ==
External videos
- "My Valentine" Music video – from McCartney's official account on YouTube

Kisses on the Bottom was released in the UK on 6 February 2012, and a day later in the US, on LP and CD. The CD version was originally released in two editions: a standard 14-track edition, (Note: UK Hear Music HRM 33369) and a 16-track "Deluxe" edition. (Note: UK Hear Music HRM 33596)

A streaming free live performance was hosted by iTunes on 9 February 2012. McCartney performed live from Capitol Studios in Los Angeles, where much of the album was recorded. People tuned into the show by accessing iTunes on their PCs or Macintosh computers. The live performance was later released as Paul McCartney's Live Kisses, directed by Jonas Åkerlund, airing on PBS' Great Performances in September 2012. The performance was released on DVD and Blu-ray on 13 November 2012. In an interview with Billboard, McCartney said that he did not rule out the possibility of a tour for the album with the musicians who played on it: "We haven't really talked about it yet. People have plenty of ideas and suggestions. I'd like to see how it goes live, just how much we enjoy it. If we all enjoy it, then we've got to think about taking it out."

=== Singles ===
McCartney performed "My Valentine" live at the 54th Annual Grammy Awards in 2012 with Diana Krall, and Joe Walsh of Eagles. (Note: McCartney would again work with Krall in September 2012.) The single climbed to number 20 on the Billboard Adult Contemporary Chart after its debut at number 28. "My Valentine" also reached number 23 on the Japan Hot 100, number 27 on the Billboard Jazz Digital Songs chart, and number 23 on the Billboard Rock Digital Songs chart. "Only Our Hearts" debuted at number 84 on the Japan Hot 100.

== Reception ==
Professional ratings
Aggregate scores
| Source | Rating |
|---|---|
| Metacritic | 62/100 |
Review scores
| Source | Rating |
| AllMusic | 3/5 stars |
| The A.V. Club | C+ |
| Chicago Tribune | 2/4 stars |
| The Daily Telegraph | 4/5 stars |
| The Guardian | 4/5 stars |
| The Independent | 2/5 stars |
| Mojo | 3/5 stars |
| PopMatters | 6/10 |
| Rolling Stone | 3/5 stars |
| Spin | 3/10 |

Kisses on the Bottom rates 62/100—meaning a "generally favorable" reception—at Metacritic, who compiled data from 26 professional reviews, sixteen of which were "mixed".

According to Rolling Stone, "like Rock 'n' Roll, John Lennon's 1975 album of primal rock gems, Kisses on the Bottom is the sound of a musician joyfully tapping his roots; and like his former song writing partner, McCartney is better transforming influences than mirroring them. But it's fun, and touching, to hear him crooning his way through the Great American Songbook." In a review of the album for BBC Music, writer Patrick Humphries referred to the collection as "an album of neglected dishes from the great banquet of American popular music", before concluding that "what McCartney accomplishes here, in the best possible sense, is an album ideally made for Easy Listening".

AllMusic's Stephen Thomas Erlewine said McCartney "cut faithful, loving versions of songs he's always sung", and deemed his two original compositions—"My Valentine" and "Only Our Hearts"—to be "quite good". Of McCartney's originals, Neil McCormick, reviewing the album for The Daily Telegraph, noted that it is "impossible to pick them out as contemporary songs amongst the standards" and added that, while "Only Our Hearts" is "unremarkable", the album's other original, "My Valentine", "has the ring of a classic". Greg Kot said the slow version of "Bye Bye Blackbird" "nearly stalls".

=== Awards and accolades ===
Kisses on the Bottom won a Grammy Award for Best Traditional Pop Vocal Album at the 2013 Grammy Awards.

== Commercial performance ==
Kisses on the Bottom peaked at number 3 on the UK Albums Chart, and number 5 on the US Billboard 200. It also debuted at number 17 on Billboard's Jazz Albums listings, before climbing to number 1 the following week. In addition, it hit number 2 on the Billboard Tastemaker Albums chart, just behind Van Halen's A Different Kind of Truth, and number 5 on the magazine's Digital Albums chart.

== Track listing ==
Kisses on the Bottom track listing
| No. | Title | Writer(s) | Length |
|---|---|---|---|
| 1. | "I'm Gonna Sit Right Down and Write Myself a Letter" | Fred E. Ahlert; Joe Young | 2:36 |
| 2. | "Home (When Shadows Fall)" | Peter van Steeden; Jeff Clarkson; Harry Clarkson | 4:04 |
| 3. | "It's Only a Paper Moon" | Harold Arlen; E. Y. Harburg; Billy Rose | 2:35 |
| 4. | "More I Cannot Wish You" | Frank Loesser | 3:04 |
| 5. | "The Glory of Love" | Billy Hill | 3:46 |
| 6. | "We Three (My Echo, My Shadow and Me)" | Sammy Mysels; Dick Robertson; Nelson Cogane | 3:22 |
| 7. | "Ac-Cent-Tchu-Ate the Positive" | Harold Arlen; Johnny Mercer | 2:32 |
| 8. | "My Valentine" | Paul McCartney | 3:14 |
| 9. | "Always" | Irving Berlin | 3:50 |
| 10. | "My Very Good Friend the Milkman" | Harold Spina; Johnny Burke | 3:04 |
| 11. | "Bye Bye Blackbird" | Ray Henderson; Mort Dixon | 4:26 |
| 12. | "Get Yourself Another Fool" | Haywood Henry; Monroe Tucker | 4:42 |
| 13. | "The Inch Worm" | Loesser | 3:43 |
| 14. | "Only Our Hearts" | McCartney | 4:21 |
| Total length: | | | 49:19 |

=== Deluxe edition ===
The deluxe version of the album includes two additional tracks (including "Baby's Request", a rerecording of a Wings song from the Back to the Egg album), a download code for access to an exclusive live show available from McCartney's website a week after the album's release, and longer liner notes and expanded album packaging, including three postcards. The US deluxe edition of the CD is 16 tracks which was available exclusively through Target stores.

Bonus tracks
| No. | Title | Writer(s) | Length |
|---|---|---|---|
| 15. | "Baby's Request" | McCartney | 3:30 |
| 16. | "My One and Only Love" | Guy Wood; Robert Mellin | 3:50 |
| Total length: | | | 56:39 |

Live from Capitol Studios
| No. | Title | Writer(s) | Length |
|---|---|---|---|
| 1. | "I'm Gonna Sit Right Down and Write Myself a Letter" | Ahlert; Young | 2:42 |
| 2. | "Home (When Shadows Fall)" | Van Steeden; J. Clarkson; H. Clarkson | 4:45 |
| 3. | "Ac-Cent-Tchu-Ate the Positive" | Arlen; Mercer | 2:51 |
| 4. | "My Valentine" | McCartney | 3:22 |

=== Kisses on the Bottom – Complete Kisses ===
An expanded edition of the album, titled Kisses on the Bottom – Complete Kisses, was released exclusively on iTunes on 26 November 2012 for the UK, and 27 November 2012 for the US. The album contained the original fourteen-track version of the album, plus four bonus tracks, and the complete Live from Capitol Studios performance (thirteen tracks). One of the bonus tracks, "The Christmas Song (Chestnuts Roasting on an Open Fire)", was released as a vinyl single titled Christmas Kisses (backed with the previously released "Wonderful Christmastime"), on both red and green vinyl, and peaked at number 25 on Billboard's Adult Contemporary chart. The track was also featured in a different mix without strings on the 2012 Christmas compilation album Holidays Rule.

Kisses on the Bottom – Complete Kisses
| No. | Title | Writer(s) | Length |
|---|---|---|---|
| 1. | "I'm Gonna Sit Right Down and Write Myself a Letter" | Ahlert; Young | 2:36 |
| 2. | "Home (When Shadows Fall)" | Van Steeden; J. Clarkson; H. Clarkson | 4:04 |
| 3. | "It's Only a Paper Moon" | Arlen; Harburg; Rose | 2:35 |
| 4. | "More I Cannot Wish You" | Loesser | 3:04 |
| 5. | "The Glory of Love" | Hill | 3:46 |
| 6. | "We Three (My Echo, My Shadow and Me)" | Mysels; Robertson; Cogane | 3:22 |
| 7. | "Ac-Cent-Tchu-Ate the Positive" | Arlen; Mercer | 2:32 |
| 8. | "My Valentine" | McCartney | 3:14 |
| 9. | "Always" | Berlin | 3:50 |
| 10. | "My Very Good Friend the Milkman" | Spina; Burke | 3:04 |
| 11. | "Bye Bye Blackbird" | Henderson; Dixon | 4:26 |
| 12. | "Get Yourself Another Fool" | Henry; Tucker | 4:42 |
| 13. | "The Inch Worm" | Loesser | 3:43 |
| 14. | "Only Our Hearts" | McCartney | 4:21 |
| 15. | "The Christmas Song (Chestnuts Roasting on an Open Fire)" | Mel Tormé; Bob Wells | 3:35 |
| 16. | "Baby's Request" | McCartney | 3:30 |
| 17. | "My One and Only Love" | Wood; Mellin | 3:50 |
| 18. | "My Valentine" (Johnny Mandel Original Arrangement) | McCartney | 3:12 |
| 19. | "I'm Gonna Sit Right Down and Write Myself a Letter" (Live) | Ahlert; Young | 2:44 |
| 20. | "Home (When Shadows Fall)" (Live) | Van Steeden; J. Clarkson; H. Clarkson | 4:26 |
| 21. | "It's Only a Paper Moon" (Live) | Arlen; Harburg; Rose | 2:55 |
| 22. | "More I Cannot Wish You" (Live) | Loesser | 3:28 |
| 23. | "The Glory of Love" (Live) | Hill | 3:53 |
| 24. | "We Three (My Echo, My Shadow and Me)" (Live) | Mysels; Robertson; Cogane | 4:14 |
| 25. | "Ac-Cent-Tchu-Ate the Positive" (Live) | Arlen; Mercer | 2:51 |
| 26. | "My Valentine" (Live) | McCartney | 3:31 |
| 27. | "Always" (Live) | Berlin | 4:21 |
| 28. | "My Very Good Friend the Milkman" (Live) | Spina; Burke | 3:14 |
| 29. | "Bye Bye Blackbird" (Live) | Henderson; Dixon | 4:45 |
| 30. | "Get Yourself Another Fool" (Live) | Henry; Tucker | 7:48 |
| 31. | "My One and Only Love" (Live) | Wood; Mellin | 4:16 |

== Personnel ==
Personnel per standard edition booklet.

Performance

- Paul McCartney – vocals; acoustic guitar on "Get Yourself Another Fool" and "The Inch Worm"
- Diana Krall – piano, rhythm arrangements (except on "Only Our Hearts")
- Tamir Hendelman – piano on "Only Our Hearts"
- Stevie Wonder – harmonica on "Only Our Hearts"
- John Pizzarelli – guitar
- Anthony Wilson – guitar on "The Glory of Love" and "My Very Good Friend the Milkman", rhythm guitar on "Get Yourself Another Fool"
- Eric Clapton – guitar on "My Valentine" and "Get Yourself Another Fool"
- Bucky Pizzarelli – guitar on "It's Only a Paper Moon" and "We Three (My Echo, My Shadow and Me)"
- John Chiodini – guitar on "Only Our Hearts"
- Robert Hurst – double bass on 1–4, 6–9, 11, 13
- John Clayton – double bass on "The Glory of Love", "My Very Good Friend the Milkman"
- Christian McBride – double bass on "Get Yourself Another Fool"
- Chuck Berghofer – double bass on "Only Our Hearts"
- Vinnie Colaiuta – drums on "Only Our Hearts"
- Karriem Riggins – drums
- Jeff Hamilton – drums on "The Glory of Love", "My Very Good Friend the Milkman"
- Mike Mainieri – vibraphone on "Home (When Shadows Fall)", "More I Cannot Wish You", "The Glory of Love", and "We Three (My Echo, My Shadow And Me)"
- London Symphony Orchestra
  - Alan Broadbent – orchestra conductor, orchestra arrangement
  - Roman Simovic – concertmaster
- Andy Stein – violin on "It's Only a Paper Moon"
- Eddie Karam – orchestra conductor
- Assa Drori – concertmaster
- Johnny Mandel – orchestra arrangement, orchestra conductor, rhythm arrangement
- Ira Nepus – trombone
- Chloe Arzy – children's choir
- Evyn Johnson – children's choir
- Makiah Johnson – children's choir
- Michael Johnson – children's choir
- Delany Meyer – children's choir
- Ilsey Moon – children's choir
- Sabrina Walden – children's choir
- Sasha Walden – children's choir
- Scottie Haskell – children's choir conductor

Production

- Tommy LiPuma – producer
- Paul Du Noyer – interviewer
- Al Schmitt – engineer, mixing
- Elliot Scheiner – engineer
- Brian Montgomery– engineer, pro-tools
- Steve Genewick – engineer, pro-tools
- Fernando Lodeiro – assistant engineer
- Marcus Johnson – assistant engineer
- Sam Okell – assistant engineer
- Kris Burton – assistant engineer
- Gordon Davidson – assistant engineer
- Paul Pritchard – assistant engineer
- Eddie Klein – assistant engineer
- Keith Smith – assistant engineer
- Jamie Kirkham – assistant engineer
- Doug Sax – mastering
- Sanwook "Sunny" Nam – mastering
- Shari Sutcliffe – music contractor, project coordinator
- Mary McCartney – cover photo
- MJ Kim – additional photographer
- John Hammel – images
- Jonathan Schofield – art conception
- Matthew Cooper – design
- Nancy Jeffries – A&R
- Scott Rodger – project manager
- MPL Production Team:
  - Lisa Power
  - Ruth Birch
  - Claudia Schmid
  - Rebecca Church
  - Billie Temple
  - Toby McColl
  - Kat Holder
  - Richard Miller
  - Jess Whiteley

== Chart performance ==
=== Weekly charts ===
| Chart (2012) | Peak position |
|---|---|
| Australian Albums (ARIA) | 15 |
| Austrian Albums (Ö3 Austria) | 4 |
| Belgian Albums (Ultratop Flanders) | 8 |
| Belgian Albums (Ultratop Wallonia) | 6 |
| Canadian Albums Chart | 4 |
| Danish Albums (Hitlisten) | 3 |
| Dutch Albums (Album Top 100) | 5 |
| Finnish Albums (Suomen virallinen lista) | 18 |
| French Albums (SNEP) | 4 |
| German Albums (Offizielle Top 100) | 9 |
| Hungarian Albums Chart | 34 |
| Irish Albums (IRMA) | 9 |
| Italian Albums (FIMI) | 15 |
| Japanese Albums (Oricon) | 13 |
| Norwegian Albums (VG-lista) | 7 |
| Scottish Albums (Official Charts) | 4 |
| Spanish Albums (Promusicae) | 18 |
| Swedish Albums (Sverigetopplistan) | 18 |
| Swiss Albums (Schweizer Hitparade) | 12 |
| UK Albums Chart | 3 |
| US Billboard 200 | 5 |
| US Billboard Jazz Albums | 1 |

=== Year-end charts ===
| Chart (2012) | Position |
|---|---|
| Danish Albums Chart | 5 |
| Dutch Albums Chart | 1 |
| French Albums Chart | 1 |
| US Billboard 200 | 132 |

== Certifications and sales ==
Certifications and sales for Kisses on the Bottom
| Region | Certification | Certified units/sales |
|---|---|---|
| United Kingdom (BPI) | Silver | 60,000^{‡} |
| United States | — | 243,000 |
^{‡} Sales+streaming figures based on certification alone.
