= Home Tonight / In a Hurry =

"Home Tonight" / "In a Hurry"

Single by Paul McCartney
- Released: 22 November 2019
- Recorded: January 2016 – February 2018
- Studio: Henson Recording (Los Angeles); Hog Hill Mill (Icklesham, UK); Abbey Road (London); Echo Studio (Los Angeles)
- Genre: Rock
- Length: 3:04 ("Home Tonight"); 4:04 ("In a Hurry")
- Label: Capitol
- Songwriter: Paul McCartney
- Producers: Greg Kurstin; Paul McCartney

Paul McCartney singles chronology
| "Nothing for Free" (2019) | "Home Tonight" / "In a Hurry" (2019) | "Find My Way" (2020) |

"Home Tonight" and "In a Hurry" are songs by Paul McCartney, released as a digital double A-side single on 22 November 2019. The two songs were later released as a vinyl single on 29 November 2019, as part of Record Store Day. Both tracks were left over from the sessions for McCartney's 2018 album Egypt Station. The release featured artwork based on the game exquisite corpse. "Home Tonight" was later included on the Home EP, released to promote McCartney's 2020 album McCartney III.

== Reception ==
The single received generally positive reviews from critics. Stereogum described "Home Tonight" as "true-to-form for McCartney", highlighting the track's brass embellishments and "jammy" feel. "In a Hurry" was acclaimed by the magazine for its "asymmetrical" synthesizer parts and "frenzied" atmosphere. Rolling Stone said the songs showed McCartney's "pop prowess hasn't diminished, with 'Home Tonight' and 'In a Hurry' both incorporating McCartney's trademark Beatlesque melodies with more modern techniques." UDiscoverMusic compared the subject matter of "In a Hurry" to that of McCartney's 1971 hit "Another Day", highlighting the lyric "Every minute, she'd be rushing, someone always breathing down her neck/Felt like everyone was pushing her down, keeping her in check".

While the song did not chart in McCartney's native UK, it did reach number 49 on the Belgian region of Flanders' Ultratop chart.

== Track listing ==
1. "Home Tonight" – 3:04
2. "In a Hurry" – 4:04

== Personnel ==
According to The Paul McCartney Project:

Home Tonight

- Paul McCartney – lead and backing vocals, bass, acoustic guitar, electric guitar, piano, drums, handclaps
- Greg Kurstin – drum programming
- Steve Herrman – trumpet
- Tom ‘Bones’ Malone – bass trombone, tenor saxophone, trumpet
- Charles Rose – trombone
- Jim Hoke – baritone saxophone
- Randy Merrill – mastering engineer
- Doug Moffett – tenor saxophone

In a Hurry

- Paul McCartney – lead and backing vocals, bass, acoustic guitar, electric guitar, slide guitar, piano, harmonium, harpsichord, drums, percussions, handclaps
- Greg Kurstin – piano, synthesizer, moog bass, vibraphone, handclaps
- Abe Laboriel Jr. – drum, tambourine
- Paul Wickens – piano
- Brian Ray – backing vocals
- Keith Smith, Steve Orchard, Matt Tuggle, Julian Burg, Brad Giroux – handclaps
- Doug Moffet – tenor saxophone
- Steve Herrman, Jamie Hovorka, Kye Palmer, Tony Guerrero – trumpet
- Charles Rose – trombone
- Dan Higgins, Stuart Clark, Joshua Ranz, Philip O’Connor, Ralph Williams – clarinet
- Doug Tornquist – tuba
- Everton Nelson, Caroline Campbell, Mario De Leon, Peter Kent, Songa Lee, Natalie Leggett, Robin Olson, Katia Popov, Michele Richards, Kathleen Sloan, Tereza Stanislav, Marcy Vaj, Josefina Vergara, Amy Wickman, John Wittenberg – violin
- John Metcalfe, Bruce White, Darrin McCann, Andrew Duckles, Kate Reddish, Rob Brophy – viola
- Ian Burdge, Vanessa Freebairn-Smith, Jodi Burnett, Richard Dodd, Rudy Stein – cello
- Gayle Levant Richards, Marcia Dickstein – harp
