= The Secret of Life: Partners, Volume Two =

Studio album by Barbra Streisand
- Released: June 27, 2025
- Recorded: 2023–2025
- Studio: Abbey Road Studios; Sony Scoring Stage; Sony Pictures Studios; WallyWorld Studios; Blue Studios; Woodshed Recording; Groove Masters; Remote Control Productions; The Village; Just for the Record Studios; Stagg Street Studio; Jungle City Studios; Essential Sound Studios; Grandma's House
- Genre: Vocal pop
- Length: 46:25
- Label: Columbia
- Producer: Walter Afanasieff; Peter Asher

Barbra Streisand chronology
Evergreens: Celebrating Six Decades on Columbia Records (2023)	The Secret of Life: Partners, Volume Two (2025)

Singles from The Secret of Life: Partners, Volume Two
- 1. "The First Time Ever I Saw Your Face" Released: April 30, 2025; 2. "My Valentine" Released: May 16, 2025; 3. "Letter to My 13 Year Old Self" Released: June 6, 2025

The Secret of Life: Partners, Volume Two is the thirty-seventh studio album by American singer Barbra Streisand, released June 27, 2025 on Columbia Records. Consisting of duets with other singers, it is a companion to her 2014 album Partners.

The album's sales extended Streisand's record on the Billboard charts for a top-40 album in every decade since the 1960s. The Secret of Life was nominated for Best Traditional Pop Vocal Album at the 68th Annual Grammy Awards.

== Background ==
Barbra Streisand began recording vocals for her new album shortly after completing the audiobook narration for her memoir My Name Is Barbra—a project that may have influenced the introspective tone of some tracks. The album cover, which captures Streisand gazing thoughtfully through a screen door, was photographed by her daughter-in-law Kathryn Boyd Brolin, marking a familial assist behind the scenes.

Among the album's notable collaborations is a duet with Bob Dylan, who had first invited Streisand to work together decades prior, finally bringing the long-awaited pairing into the studio. The project also features Ariana Grande, reuniting with Streisand after their live performance together at Chicago's United Center in August 2019. The guest lineup includes Josh Groban, who first recorded with Streisand in 2002, and is the only artist to appear on both Partners (2014) and this 2025 sequel.

== Promotion ==
The album announcement on April 30, 2025, coincided with the release of "The First Time Ever I Saw Your Face", the lead single with Hozier. The Paul McCartney duet "My Valentine" followed on May 16, 2025, as the second single. The third single, "Letter to My 13 Year Old Self" with Laufey, was released on June 6, 2025.

== Commercial performance ==
The album debuted at No. 31 on the Billboard 200 for the week of July 12. With this, Streisand extended her record as the woman with the most top 40 albums in the chart's history — now totaling 55 titles — surpassing artists like Aretha Franklin and Madonna, who each have 26. The record also debuted at No. 4 on the Top Album Sales chart (for 18,000 physical copies sold), demonstrating her commercial relevance after more than six decades in the music industry. According to Luminate the album sold 25,000 copies in the first two weeks in United States. In its second week, it sold 4,262 CDs and Vinyl on Amazon.com, and was number 1 in the website sales.

== Track listing ==
All tracks produced by Walter Afanasieff and Peter Asher.

The Secret of Life: Partners, Volume Two track listing
No.	Title	Writer(s)	Duet partner(s)	Length
1.	"The First Time Ever I Saw Your Face"	Ewan MacColl	Hozier	4:33
2.	"My Valentine"	Paul McCartney	Paul McCartney	4:18
3.	"To Lose You Again"	Howard Lawrence; Jimmy Napes; Sam Smith	Sam Smith	3:43
4.	"The Very Thought of You"	Ray Noble	Bob Dylan	3:52
5.	"Letter to My 13 Year Old Self"	Laufey Jónsdóttir; Spencer Stewart	Laufey	4:56
6.	"One Heart, One Voice"	Walter Afanasieff; Jay Landers; Charlie Midnight	Mariah Carey & Ariana Grande	5:19
7.	"I Love Us"	Bill Anderson; Steve Dorff	Tim McGraw	4:36
8.	"Secret O' Life"	James Taylor	James Taylor	3:35
9.	"Fragile"	Gordon Sumner	Sting	4:46
10.	"Where Do I Go from You?"	Desmond Child; Davitt Sigerson	Josh Groban	3:22
11.	"Love Will Survive"	Afanasieff; Midnight; Kara Talve; Hans Zimmer	Seal	3:25
Total length:				46:25

== Personnel ==
Credits adapted from Tidal.

=== Musicians ===
- Barbra Streisand – vocals
- Bruce Dukov – concertmaster
- William Ross – conductor
- Everton Nelson – orchestra
- Jochem van der Saag – programming
- Leland Sklar – bass (tracks 1–3, 5, 7–9)
- Russell Kunkel – drums (1, 2, 5, 9)
- Dean Parks – acoustic guitar (1, 2, 5)
- Hozier – vocals (1)
- Paul McCartney – vocals (2)
- Walter Afanasieff – keyboards (3, 6–11), piano (3, 6, 7, 10, 11), organ (3), arrangement (4)
- Andrew Synowiec – electric guitar (3, 6)
- Allie Feder – background vocals (3, 9)
- Baraka May – background vocals (3, 9)
- David Loucks – background vocals (3, 9)
- Waddy Wachtel – guitar (3), electric guitar (9)
- Sam Smith – vocals (3)
- Grégoire Maret – harmonica (4)
- Randy Waldman – piano, arrangement (4)
- Bob Dylan – vocals (4)
- Lenny Castro – percussion (5, 9)
- Laufey – vocals (5)
- Mariah Carey – vocals (6)
- Ariana Grande – vocals (6)
- John "JR" Robinson – drums (7, 8)
- Greg Leisz – pedal steel guitar (7)
- Tim McGraw – vocals (7)
- James Taylor – acoustic guitar, vocals (8)
- Leonardo Amuedo – acoustic guitar (9)
- Pedro Eustache – recorder (9)
- Sting – vocals (9)
- Josh Groban – vocals (10)
- Seal – vocals (11)

=== Technical ===
- Peter Asher – production
- Walter Afanasieff – production
- Jochem van der Saag – mixing, mastering, recording
- Paul Blakemore – mastering
- Alisse Laymac – engineering
- Colby Donaldson – engineering
- Daniel Cullen – engineering
- Dmytro Gordon – engineering
- Dylan Waterhouse – engineering
- Erik Swanson – engineering
- Greg Foeller – engineering
- Josh Kay – engineering
- Kristina Fisk – engineering
- Marta DiNozzi – engineering
- Mirza Sheriff – engineering
- Nick Hodges – engineering
- Nolan Bacardi – engineering
- Erik Lutkins – recording (all tracks), vocal engineering (7)
- Brian Garten – recording
- George Oulton – recording
- Michael Aarvold – recording
- Nathaniel Kunkel – recording
- Shawn Murphy – recording
- Simon Rhodes – recording
- Steve Genewick – recording
- Steve Orchard – recording
- Wesley Seidman – recording
- Adrian Bradford – recording (2–11)
- Lou Carrao – recording (6)
- Byron Gallimore – vocal production (7)

== Charts ==
Chart performance for The Secret of Life: Partners, Volume Two
Chart (2025)	Peak position
Australian Albums (ARIA)	63
Austrian Albums (Ö3 Austria)	14
Belgian Albums (Ultratop Flanders)	59
Belgian Albums (Ultratop Wallonia)	60
Dutch Albums (Album Top 100)	26
German Albums (Offizielle Top 100)	22
Greek Albums (IFPI)	54
Japanese Western Albums (Oricon)	12
Scottish Albums (OCC)	7
Swiss Albums (Schweizer Hitparade)	23
Taiwanese Western Albums (G-Music)	2
UK Albums (OCC)	40
US Billboard 200	31
US Top Album Sales (Billboard)	4

== See also ==
- Encore: Movie Partners Sing Broadway (2016)
