= My Valentine =

Single by Paul McCartney

from the album Kisses on the Bottom
- Released: 20 December 2011
- Studio: Avatar Studios, New York
- Length: 3:14
- Label: Hear Music
- Songwriter: Paul McCartney
- Producer: Tommy LiPuma

Paul McCartney singles chronology
"(I Want to) Come Home" (2010)	"My Valentine" (2011)	"Out of Sight" (2013)

"My Valentine" is a song written and performed by English musician Paul McCartney. It appears on his fifteenth solo studio album Kisses on the Bottom (2012), and was released as the record's lead single on 20 December 2011. One of only two original compositions on the album, "My Valentine" was written as a love song for McCartney's wife, Nancy Shevell. The song features Eric Clapton on acoustic guitar.

"My Valentine" earned positive reviews from critics, with multiple publications feeling it held its own against the covers on Kisses on the Bottom. A music video was created for the song, directed by McCartney and starring Natalie Portman and Johnny Depp.

McCartney produced a cover version of "My Valentine" for the 2022 Michael Bublé album Higher.

McCartney re-recorded the song as a duet with Barbra Streisand, released on 16 May 2025 as the second single from her album The Secret of Life: Partners, Volume Two.

== Reception ==
Upon release, "My Valentine" charted in multiple countries throughout mainland Europe. The song reached number 38 in Belgium, while in the Netherlands, it peaked at number 93. In the US, it reached number 19 on the Billboard Adult Contemporary chart.

"My Valentine" has received positive reviews from critics. Rolling Stone Australia ranked it as the 71st best solo track by a member of the Beatles, calling it "an artistic statement of purpose" and likening it to "Tower of Song" by Leonard Cohen. American Songwriter considered it on par with the standards covered on Kisses on the Bottom, stating it "couldn't be any more beautiful in its simplicity", as well as arguing it "may overall be McCartney's greatest love song". In a review of the album for Rolling Stone, Will Hermes echoed this sentiment, stating the song "holds its own" against the covers on the album, likening the track to Nat King Cole's rendition of "My Funny Valentine".

== Personnel ==
According to The Paul McCartney Project:

- Paul McCartney – vocals
- Diana Krall – piano, rhythm arrangement
- John Pizzarelli – guitar
- Eric Clapton – guitar
- Robert Hurst – bass
- Karriem Riggins – drums
- London Symphony Orchestra – orchestra

== Charts ==
Chart performance for My Valentine
Chart (2012)	Peak position
Belgium (Ultratip Bubbling Under Flanders)	38
Belgium (Ultratip Bubbling Under Wallonia)	19
Netherlands (Single Top 100)	93
US Adult Contemporary (Billboard)	19
