= McCartney III Imagined =

2021 remix album by Paul McCartney

Remix album by Paul McCartney
- Released: 16 April 2021
- Studio: Various
- Genre: Various
- Length: 47:23 (digital); 50:07 (physical)
- Labels: Capitol; Universal
- Producer: Various

Paul McCartney chronology
McCartney III (2020)	McCartney III Imagined (2021)	McCartney I II III (2022)

Singles from McCartney III Imagined
- 1. "The Kiss of Venus (Dominic Fike version)" Released: 11 March 2021; 2. "Find My Way (featuring Beck)" Released: 25 March 2021; 3. "Slidin' (EOB remix)" Released: 7 April 2021

McCartney III Imagined is a remix album of songs from McCartney III, the eighteenth solo album by English musician Paul McCartney. It was released digitally on 16 April 2021, with a physical version released on 23 July. It features remixes by numerous artists.

The tracks were curated by McCartney, featuring "friends, fans, and brand new acquaintances". Dominic Fike's version of "The Kiss of Venus" was released as the first single, followed by Beck's version of "Find My Way" and Ed O'Brien's version of "Slidin'".

Coinciding with its release, McCartney had live conversations via Instagram Live with several contributors. The album received positive reviews. Following McCartney III accomplishing the same feat, it became the first remix album to top Billboard's Top Album Sales Chart in more than a decade, also reaching number 1 on the US Rock Albums and Vinyl Albums charts.

== Background ==
For McCartney III Imagined, McCartney enlisted numerous collaborators to remix and perform songs from the album, including: Beck, Dominic Fike, Khruangbin, St. Vincent, Dev Hynes, Phoebe Bridgers, Ed O'Brien, Damon Albarn, Josh Homme, Anderson .Paak, Robert Del Naja, and Idris Elba.

== Critical reception ==
Professional ratings
Aggregate scores
Source	Rating
AnyDecentMusic?	7.0/10
Metacritic	76/100
Review scores
Source	Rating
AllMusic	3/5 stars
Clash	8/10
Exclaim!	8/10
The Independent	4/5 stars
Loud and Quiet	6/10
musicOMH	3.5/5 stars
NME	4/5 stars
The Observer	4/5 stars
Paste	8.0/10
Pitchfork	6.6/10
Uncut	7/10

At Metacritic, which assigns a normalized rating out of 100 to reviews from professional publications, McCartney III Imagined has an average score of 76, based on 11 reviews, indicating "generally favorable reviews". Aggregator AnyDecentMusic? gave the album 7 out of 10, based on its assessment of the critical consensus.

== Commercial performance ==
After the physical debut, Paul McCartney's McCartney III Imagined, sold 21,000 copies in the U.S. during its first big physical sales week ending July 29, 2021, reaching No. 1 on Billboard's Top Album Sales chart. Of Imagined’s sales of 21,000 in the week ending July 29, physical album sales comprise essentially all of that figure (16,100 vinyl LPs, 4,300 CDs and about 300 cassettes). Imagined also debuts at No. 1 on Billboard’s Vinyl Albums chart. It also bows at No. 2 on the Tastemaker Albums chart, which ranks the top-selling albums of the week at independent and small chain record stores, having sold just over 4,000 copies, across all formats, through those sellers.

== Track listing ==
All tracks are written by Paul McCartney.

McCartney III Imagined – Digital edition
No.	Title	Length
1.	"Find My Way" (featuring Beck)	4:53
2.	"The Kiss of Venus" (Dominic Fike version)	2:23
3.	"Pretty Boys" (featuring Khruangbin)	5:48
4.	"Women and Wives" (St. Vincent remix)	3:00
5.	"Deep Down" (Blood Orange remix)	4:24
6.	"Seize the Day" (featuring Phoebe Bridgers)	3:29
7.	"Slidin'" (EOB remix)	2:39
8.	"Long Tailed Winter Bird" (Damon Albarn remix)	4:10
9.	"Lavatory Lil" (Josh Homme version)	2:53
10.	"When Winter Comes" (Anderson .Paak remix)	2:21
11.	"Deep Deep Feeling" (3D RDN remix)	11:23
Total length:		47:23

McCartney III Imagined – Physical edition
No.	Title	Length
12.	"Long Tailed Winter Bird" (Idris Elba remix)	2:44
Total length:		50:07

== Charts ==
Chart performance for McCartney III Imagined
Chart (2021)	Peak position
French Albums (SNEP)	104
Japanese Albums (Oricon)	28
Scottish Albums (Official Charts)	3
Spanish Albums (Promusicae)	46
UK Albums (Official Charts)	13
US Billboard 200	19
