= Long Tailed Winter Bird =

2020 song by Paul McCartney

Song by Paul McCartney

from the album McCartney III
- Released: 18 December 2020
- Recorded: Early 2020
- Studio: Hog Hill Mill (Icklesham, UK)
- Genre: Swamp blues
- Length: 5:16
- Label: Capitol
- Songwriter: Paul McCartney
- Producer: Paul McCartney

Music video
- "Long Tailed Winter Bird" on YouTube

"Long Tailed Winter Bird" is a song by English musician Paul McCartney, released by Capitol Records. The song is featured on McCartney's 2020 album McCartney III and was released on 18 December 2020.

== Recording ==
McCartney stated that the song began "as a piece of film music which I extended. The title came about because it was extended into a full length song, we just called it ‘Long Tailed Winter Bird’" and further noted that "there is actually in my bird book I saw a long tailed duck, a long tailed winter duck I think". The piece of film music in question was "Winter Bird" (also included on McCartney III), which McCartney noted he liked so much that after recording it he "then thought ‘OK let’s keep going’ and I started jamming on the same ideas but I lengthened it and then I started putting it on a guitar and drums and bass." Audio engineer Steve Orchard noted it was the first full song recorded during the album's sessions, stating there were "a couple of versions of the outro music that sort of morphed into this groove that Paul’s playing - the main acoustic riff in that... that was the beginning of the whole record, it kind of took us off on this route.”

== Critical reception ==
In his review of McCartney III in Rolling Stone, critic Rob Sheffield referred to the song as "marvelous", citing its "frenzied folk guitar" as a highlight. The Independent reviewer Helen Brown also praised the song, calling it an "exhilarating blast of swamp blues" and noted that its "finger-hammering fretwork and slam-strumming of the hypnotic, interwoven guitar patterns is so wild and vigorous that you'd never guess the man making it was well into the pandemic’s “vulnerable” demographic". NME reviewer Mark Beaumont echoed Brown's assessment of the song as "swamp blues" while adding that the song helped "to shroud [McCartney III] in a rootsy, pastoral intimacy fitting for the times".

Writing for Uncut, John Robinson positively compared the track to works by The Byrds and Crowded House. Less impressed, Pitchfork reviewer Stuart Berman wrote that the song is "ultimately all warm-up with little payoff... always teasing that it's about to grow into something more peculiar and powerful, yet never quite getting there."

== Other versions ==
Along with every other song on McCartney III, partial sheet music was made available for "Long Tailed Winter Bird" prior to the album's release as part of a promotional campaign called "12 Days of Paul", leading to a number of cover versions. One of these, by The Umoza Music Project, was released as the b-side to their 2022 single "Home", which features McCartney on bass.

=== Remixes ===
On 30 July 2021, a remix made by Idris Elba was released and added as a bonus track to physical copies of the album McCartney III Imagined. Elba's remix features additional lyrics performed by himself and McCartney. Also part of the remix album, "Long Tailed Winter Bird" received another remix by Damon Albarn only available on the digital edition.

== Personnel ==
- Paul McCartney – lead vocals, Hofner bass, acoustic guitar, recorder, harmonium, drums
