= McCartney III =

Studio album by Paul McCartney
- Released: 18 December 2020
- Recorded: Early 2020; 1992 ("When Winter Comes"); January 2016 – February 2018 (part of "Slidin'")
- Studios: Hogg Hill Mill (Icklesham, UK)
- Genre: Rock
- Length: 44:48
- Label: Capitol
- Producers: Paul McCartney (all tracks); Greg Kurstin (track 7); George Martin (track 11)

Paul McCartney chronology
Amoeba Gig (2019)	McCartney III (2020)	McCartney III Imagined (2021)

Paul McCartney studio album chronology
Egypt Station (2018)	McCartney III (2020)	The Boys of Dungeon Lane (2026)

Singles from McCartney III
- 1. "Find My Way" Released: 18 December 2020

McCartney III (Note: "III" being stylised on the front cover as the three pips of a die) is the nineteenth solo album by English musician Paul McCartney, released on 18 December 2020 by Capitol Records. It serves as a continuation to his solo albums McCartney (1970) and McCartney II (1980). Similar to those albums, McCartney III features McCartney on all instruments, with the exception of the track "Slidin'".

McCartney III became McCartney's first UK number-one solo album since Flowers in the Dirt in 1989, and debuted at number two on the US Billboard 200 albums chart. At the 64th Annual Grammy Awards, it was nominated for Best Rock Album and Best Rock Song (for "Find My Way"). In 2022, the album was packaged with McCartney and McCartney II as part of the McCartney I II III box set.

== Background ==
McCartney recorded McCartney III in early 2020 at his own Hog Hill Mill studio in Sussex, while in lockdown during the COVID-19 pandemic. McCartney began by recording the instrument on which he wrote the song, then adding further layers. He said: "It was a lot of fun. It was about making music for yourself rather than making music that has to do a job. So, I just did stuff I fancied doing. I had no idea this would end up as an album."

As on previous McCartney albums, McCartney played all the instruments himself. He had also played most of the instruments on his 2005 album Chaos and Creation in the Backyard (described at the time by journalist David Hajdu as being "essentially McCartney III") and on his 2007 album Memory Almost Full. McCartney also played all the instruments on the Fireman albums Rushes (1998) and Electric Arguments (2008).

The album's cover art and typography was designed by artist Ed Ruscha, an acquaintance of the McCartney family. Almost three years after the album's release, in November 2023, Ruscha would go on to design the single cover of The Beatles' song "Now and Then".

== Promotion ==
The domain name mccartneyiii.com was registered on 28 August 2020 by CSC Corporate Domains, the company that previously registered paulmccartney.com and flaming-pie.com (for the reissue of Flaming Pie, McCartney's 1997 studio album). Its landing page originally appeared with a 303 error notice, instead of the usual 404 error notice.

On 16 October, teasers for the album started appearing on the streaming service Spotify with animations over the artwork for McCartney and McCartney II showing a die with three pips facing upwards. The following week, McCartney's Twitter account started posting photos at 33 minutes past the hour with a recurring motif of three. On 21 October, McCartney's social media channels officially announced the forthcoming release of the album on 11 December. On 19 November, it was announced that due to unforeseeable production delays, the album release date had to be moved back one week to 18 December.

Starting from 4 December 2020, McCartney sent via his Facebook page a series of 12 daily posts unveiling the titles of each of the 11 tracks from the album, through murals painted in 12 different cities all over the world. (Note: London, Los Angeles, Mexico City, Sydney, Toronto, Berlin, New York City, Tokyo, Chicago, Paris, Rio, Liverpool.) Each mural showed the title of a new track, an excerpt from its music score, and its author (Paul McCartney), along with the album title and its release date. McCartney also asked all musicians to post their video covers of the 11 songs through his special website #12DaysOfPaul.

During his appearance on The Howard Stern Show on 15 December 2020, McCartney revealed that American singer-songwriter Taylor Swift originally decided to postpone the release of her album Evermore by one week to respect the original 11 December release date of his album. Upon learning this, McCartney decided to release his album on 18 December instead so that Swift could move forward with the rollout of Evermore as initially planned.

On 17 December, a day before the album release, two live appearances were revealed for that day: one on The Tonight Show Starring Jimmy Fallon and a YouTube Released special featuring Chris Rock, alongside the release date for the lead single "Find My Way", which was released at the same time as the album.

In November 2021, a mini-documentary about the creation of the previous year's Third Man Records 333 edition of McCartney III using recycled McCartney and McCartney II records was released.

== Release ==
McCartney III was released on 18 December 2020 on CD, vinyl, cassette and digital formats. The vinyl editions include a variety of colours: standard black, Third Man Records exclusive yellow-with-black-dots limited to 333 copies, Third Man Records exclusive red limited to 3,000 copies, #SpotifyFansFirst 130g Coke-bottle clear vinyl limited to 3,000 copies worldwide, 130g yellow limited to 3,000 copies worldwide, 130g violet limited to 3,000 copies worldwide, Newbury Comics exclusive pink limited to 1,500 copies, Target exclusive green, uDiscover exclusive orange, selected retailers exclusive blue, independent (indie) record stores exclusive white.

In November 2021, an additional edition of Third Man Records exclusive vinyl was released: yellow with black splatter, it was limited to 3,333 copies.

== Commercial performance ==
McCartney III had strong sales domestically. The album debuted at number one on the UK Albums Chart on 25 December 2020, marking his first number-one solo album in his home country in 31 years (since 1989's Flowers in the Dirt). The album reached the top spot by selling 33,079 album-equivalent units.

Internationally, sales were also strong. In the US, the album debuted at number two on the Billboard 200 with 107,000 equivalent album units, of which 104,000 were album sales. The placement earned McCartney the feat of being the first artist to have a new album at the top or second-top of the chart in each of the last six decades. McCartney III was also the top-selling album in its debut week in the US, outselling Swift's Evermore and Eminem's Music to Be Murdered By – Side B in pure sales (not including equivalent album units). The album also recorded the third largest US vinyl sales week since Nielsen SoundScan tracking era began in 1991. The album also reached the top 10 of many other European markets.

== Critical reception ==
Professional ratings
Aggregate scores
Source	Rating
AnyDecentMusic?	7.6/10
Metacritic	81/100
Review scores
Source	Rating
AllMusic	4/5 stars
The A.V. Club	B
The Daily Telegraph	4/5 stars
Exclaim!	9/10
The Guardian	4/5 stars
The Independent	4/5 stars
NME	4/5 stars
Pitchfork	7.2/10
Rolling Stone	4/5 stars
Uncut	4.5/5 stars

McCartney III was very well received by music critics, achieving widespread critical acclaim. At Metacritic, which assigns a normalised rating out of 100 to reviews from professional publications, McCartney III has an average score of 81, based on 23 reviews, indicating "universal acclaim". Aggregator AnyDecentMusic? gives it 7.6 out of 10, based on their assessment of the critical consensus.

Writing for The Guardian, Alexis Petridis states that McCartney's "lockdown LP has his best songs in years" and that the album "is the most straightforwardly enjoyable and certainly the most personal McCartney album since 2005’s haunted, twilit Chaos and Creation in the Backyard". Rob Sheffield of Rolling Stone wrote that McCartney III "recalls the pastoral, laid-back sound of his 1970 solo debut" and describes the album as a "playful gem". In his album review for NME, Mark Beaumont calls the LP a "stellar return to his three-decade-spanning series". Helen Brown of The Independent stated that "Melodic charm, craftsmanship and open-minded optimism make this solo album a real treat" and describes the album as "Weird, wonderful and whimsical", with McCartney on "inspirational form".

== McCartney III Imagined ==
Announced on 11 March 2021, McCartney released the remix album McCartney III Imagined. Described as an album of "reinterpretations, remixes, and covers" of songs from McCartney III, it became available on streaming services on 16 April and was released on physical media by 23 July. The album includes Dominic Fike's version of "The Kiss of Venus", which was issued as its first single, with Beck's track and EOB's remix being the subsequent singles. The selection of tracks was curated by McCartney himself, featuring "friends, fans, and brand new acquaintances".

== Reissues ==
The album was reissued on 5 August 2022 in a boxset entitled McCartney I II III, consisting of three LPs or three CDs, along with the first and second albums of the trilogy.

For the third anniversary of the album's release, McCartney III was reissued as the 3x3 Edition. The 2023 reissue was available strictly from McCartney's website and available as three different "tri-colour vinyl pressings ... allocated randomly". Each of the three different 3x3 versions included "a print handwritten by Paul", revised cover art featuring a photograph of McCartney taken by Mary McCartney, and "an Ed Ruscha sketch poster" of the album's dice.

== Track listing ==
All tracks written by Paul McCartney.

1. "Long Tailed Winter Bird" – 5:16
2. "Find My Way" – 3:54
3. "Pretty Boys" – 3:00
4. "Women and Wives" – 2:52
5. "Lavatory Lil" – 2:22
6. "Deep Deep Feeling" – 8:25
7. "Slidin'" – 3:23
8. "The Kiss of Venus" – 3:06
9. "Seize the Day" – 3:20
10. "Deep Down" – 5:52
11. "Winter Bird/When Winter Comes" – 3:12

Note: On vinyl editions of the album, the positions of "Slidin'" and "Deep Deep Feeling" are swapped. The former ends side one, while the latter starts side two.

McCartney III bonus tracks
Title	Length	Edition	
"Women and Wives" (studio outtake)	3:15	Yellow deluxe edition CD	Japanese special edition CD
"Lavatory Lil" (studio outtake)	3:07	Red deluxe edition CD	Japanese special edition CD
"The Kiss of Venus" (phone demo)	2:10	White deluxe edition CD	Japanese special edition CD
"Slidin'" (Düsseldorf jam)	4:58	Blue deluxe edition CD	Japanese special edition CD

== Personnel ==
Musicians

- Paul McCartney – vocals, guitars, bass guitar, piano, drums, keyboards, recorder, percussion, horns, double bass, synthesizers
- Rusty Anderson – electric guitar (track 7)
- Abe Laboriel Jr. – drums (track 7)

Production

- Steve Orchard – engineer
- Greg Kurstin – co-producer (track 7)
- Keith Smith – assistant engineer at Hogg Hill Mill
- Alex Pasco – engineer (track 7)
- Bob Kraushaar – engineer (track 11)
- Randy Merrill – mastering at Sterling Sound
- George Martin – co-producer (track 11)

Artwork

- Ed Ruscha – cover art and typography
- Mary McCartney – cover portrait, photography
- Sonny McCartney – photography
- Nick Steinhardt – art direction and design
- Brian Clarke – stained glass

== Charts ==
=== Weekly charts ===
Weekly chart performance of McCartney III
Chart (2020)	Peak position
Australian Albums (ARIA)	6
Austrian Albums (Ö3 Austria)	2
Belgian Albums (Ultratop Flanders)	5
Belgian Albums (Ultratop Wallonia)	8
Canadian Albums (Billboard)	7
Czech Albums (ČNS IFPI)	11
Danish Albums (Hitlisten)	9
Dutch Albums (Album Top 100)	1
Finnish Albums (Suomen virallinen lista)	4
French Albums (SNEP)	17
German Albums (Offizielle Top 100)	1
Hungarian Albums (MAHASZ)	26
Irish Albums (Official Charts)	14
Italian Albums (FIMI)	10
Japanese Albums (Oricon)	5
New Zealand Albums (RMNZ)	28
Norwegian Albums (VG-lista)	6
Portuguese Albums (AFP)	4
Scottish Albums (Official Charts)	1
Spanish Albums (Promusicae)	15
Swedish Albums (Sverigetopplistan)	2
Swiss Albums (Schweizer Hitparade)	2
UK Albums (Official Charts)	1
US Billboard 200	2
US Top Rock Albums (Billboard)	1

=== Year-end charts ===
2020 year-end chart performance of McCartney III
Chart (2020)	Position
French Albums (SNEP)	191

2021 year-end chart performance of McCartney III
Chart (2021)	Position
Belgian Albums (Ultratop Wallonia)	181
German Albums (Offizielle Top 100)	41
Swiss Albums (Schweizer Hitparade)	43
US Top Rock Albums (Billboard)	50
