= Women and Wives =

2020 song by Paul McCartney

Single by Paul McCartney

from the album McCartney III
- B-side: "Women and Wives (St. Vincent remix)"
- Released: 18 December 2020 (album), 17 June 2022 (single)
- Recorded: April–June 2020
- Studio: Hogg Hill Mill (Icklesham, UK)
- Genre: Blues
- Length: 2:52
- Label: Capitol
- Songwriter: Paul McCartney
- Producer: Paul McCartney

Paul McCartney singles chronology
"The Kiss of Venus" (2021)	"Women and Wives" (2020)	"Say Say Say (Kygo remix)" (2023)

Music video
- "Women and Wives" (Official Lyric Video) on YouTube

"Women and Wives" is a song by Paul McCartney, released as the fourth track from McCartney's 2020 album McCartney III. It was released exclusively as a Record Store Day single.

== Background ==
McCartney wrote "Women and Wives" after reading a biography of American blues guitarist Huddy William Ledbetter, known as Lead Belly, as McCartney stated: "I wrote this when I was in Los Angeles and I had just been reading a book on the blues artist Lead Belly, so I was trying to get in this bluesy mood so I played on the piano, played some simple chords and started singing in what I imagined was like bluesy [sings], so that was that and then I recorded it at the studio in England."

== Recording ==
"Women and Wives" was recorded primarily on piano, and also includes the exact double bass Bill Black used when recording with Elvis Presley, as revealed in a Spotify Storyline, a feature on Spotify that would give the listener information about a song if available.

== Reception ==
Writing for the A.V. Club, Gwen Ihnat believed McCartney is "admonishing the rest of us [..] while the song ultimately has a hopeful tinge as McCartney urges each generation to teach compassion to the next, the song’s piano-led nostalgic melancholy is undeniable. Mark Beaumont wrote the song is a "wise and austere piano shuffle worthy of Nick Cave or Johnny Cash". Rob Sheffield called it in a Rolling Stone review a "London Town-style yacht-rock ballad". It is the most played track from McCartney III live. McCartney named it as his favourite track on the album.

== Personnel ==
According to the McCartney III booklet:

- Paul McCartney – piano, Bill Black's double bass, drums, vocals

== St. Vincent remix ==
"Women and Wives (St. Vincent remix)"

Promotional single by Paul McCartney featuring St. Vincent

from the album McCartney III Imagined
- Released: 16 April 2021
- Length: 3:00
- Label: Capitol
- Songwriter: Paul McCartney
- Producers: Paul McCartney; St. Vincent

Visualizer
- "Women and Wives" (St. Vincent Remix) (Visualizer)" on YouTube

A remix of the track was done by American musician St. Vincent and included on McCartney III Imagined, a remix album.

=== Reception ===
Stuart Berman wrote St. Vincent "amps up the film-noir melodrama of “Women and Wives” by multi-tracking herself into a girl-group chorus line"
