= Find My Way (Paul McCartney song) =

2020 song by Paul McCartney

Single by Paul McCartney

from the album McCartney III
- B-side: "Winter Bird/When Winter Comes"
- Released: 18 December 2020
- Recorded: April–June 2020
- Studio: Hog Hill Mill (Icklesham, UK)
- Genre: Rock
- Length: 3:55
- Label: Capitol
- Songwriter: Paul McCartney
- Producer: Paul McCartney

Paul McCartney singles chronology
| "Home Tonight / In a Hurry" (2019) | "Find My Way" (2020) | "The Kiss of Venus" (2021) |

Music video
- "Find My Way" on YouTube

"Find My Way" is a song by the English musician and former Beatles bassist and vocalist Paul McCartney. It was released by Capitol Records on 18 December 2020 as the first single from his McCartney III album.

== Background ==
The song started out on piano and was based on an idea that Paul McCartney had while in his car and started singing along and making his own lyrics and music. "Find My Way" is a song McCartney wrote to help get people through the COVID-19 pandemic.

The song was recorded using a Brenell tape machine. The song also switches between the Moog synth bass and the Hofner bass.

== Promotion ==
On December 5, 2020, the sheet music of the song and the rest of the tracks on McCartney III were posted on the wall of a random building in Liverpool to promote the album.

== Music video ==
The video was directed by Roman Coppola, and shows Paul McCartney playing every instrument on the song in a collage of footage taken by 46 cameras.

== Awards and accolades ==
"Find My Way" was nominated for Best Rock Song at the 64th Annual Grammy Awards but lost to "Waiting on a War" by Foo Fighters.

== Personnel ==
According to The Paul McCartney Project:

- Paul McCartney – lead and backing vocals, acoustic guitar, electric guitar, bass, harpsichord, moog bass, synth bass, drums

== Beck remix ==
"Find My Way"

Single by Paul McCartney and Beck

from the album McCartney III Imagined
- Released: 25 March 2021
- Genre: Funk
- Length: 4:54
- Label: Capitol
- Songwriter: Paul McCartney
- Producers: Paul McCartney; Beck

Music video
- "Find My Way (Feat. Beck)" on YouTube

In 2021, the song was remixed by Beck and included as a part of the McCartney III Imagined album.

=== Music video ===
The music video for the remix was directed by Andrew Dohono, and features a digitally de-aged McCartney deepfaked onto a mask being worn by dancer Jordan Johnson as he goes through a hotel. The video ends with Beck taking off a mask, as if to imply he was the one dancing.

== Charts ==
Chart performance for Find My Way
| Chart (2020) | Peak position |
|---|---|
| Belgium (Ultratop 50 Flanders) | 9 |
| Taiwan Top 10 | 7 |
| US Adult Alternative Airplay (Billboard) | 31 |
