= The Kiss of Venus =

2020 song by Paul McCartney

Song by Paul McCartney

from the album McCartney III
- Released: 18 December 2020
- Studio: Hogg Hill Mill
- Genre: Rock
- Length: 3:06
- Label: Capitol
- Songwriter: Paul McCartney
- Producer: Paul McCartney

"The Kiss of Venus" is a song by the English musician Paul McCartney from his 2020 album McCartney III and later remixed by Dominic Fike on McCartney III Imagined.

== Background ==
McCartney once stated during an interview with CBS News: "On one of the songs off the new album, called 'Kiss of Venus,' I wrote it one summer's day, and I got the beginning of it – The Kiss of Venus, da, da, da, da – and I thought, 'Oh, that's OK, I'll record it, I'll finish it someday.' But then I said to myself, 'No, what have you got? You haven't got anything on [right now]. Sit here and finish that bloody song!"

== Promotion ==
The song was previewed before McCartney III's release on 19 November 2020. To celebrate the third anniversary of McCartney III, titled McCartney III 3×3, the set featured a lyric draft of the song.

== Personnel ==
- Paul McCartney – vocals, acoustic guitar, harpsichord

== Dominic Fike remix ==
"The Kiss of Venus (Featuring Dominic Fike)"

Single by Paul McCartney and Dominic Fike

from the album McCartney III Imagined
- Released: 11 March 2021
- Genre: Rock
- Length: 2:23
- Label: Capitol/Universal
- Songwriter: Paul McCartney
- Producers: Paul McCartney; Dominic Fike

Paul McCartney and Dominic Fike singles chronology
"Find My Way" (2020)	"The Kiss of Venus (Featuring Dominic Fike)" (2021)	"Women and Wives" (2022)

Music video
- "The Kiss of Venus (Featuring Dominic Fike)" on YouTube

The remix album, McCartney III Imagined, features a remix of the song done by Dominic Fike.

=== Music video ===
The music video for the remix was shot in New York City.

=== Charts ===
Chart (2021)	Peak position
New Zealand Hot Singles (RMNZ)	31
