= Paul McCartney videography =

The videography of Paul McCartney includes 51 home videos and television specials, 102 music videos and 3 documentary appearances.

== Home videos and television specials ==
Title	Details	Notes
James Paul McCartney	Released: 16 April 1973 (US); 10 May 1973 (UK); 7 December 2018 (DVD)	Variety show TV special performed by Paul McCartney and Wings.
One Hand Clapping	Released: As part of the Paul McCartney Archive Collection; never broadcast; 2 November 2010 (DVD); 26 September 2024 (theatrical, limited screenings)	Wings playing live at Abbey Road Studios with voice-over interviews of the band. Filmed in August and October 1974.
Wings Live in Melbourne	Released: 13 November 1975	Concert TV special from the Sidney Myer Music Bowl during the "Wings Over the World" tour.
Wings Over the World	Released: 16 March 1979 (US broadcast); 8 April 1979 (UK broadcast); 27 May 2013 (DVD)	Documentary TV special of McCartney's Wings Over the World tour.
Rockestra Special	Released: Unreleased	Film related to the work-in-progress of the Rockestra super-group performance from Concert for Kampuchea. Directed by Barry Chattington; filmed 3–4 October 1978
Back to the Egg	Released: November 1979 (US); 10 June 1981 (UK)	TV special promoting the album Back to the Egg, it consisted of official music videos.
Rockshow	Released: 26 November 1980 (US theatrical); 8 April 1981 (UK theatrical); October 1981 (Betamax/VHS); 12 October 1982 (VHS/Laserdisc/CED); 15 May 2013 (US theatrical re-release); 10 June 2013 (DVD/Blu-ray)	Concert from McCartney's 1976 "Wings Over America" tour.
Paul McCartney: The Man, His Music, and His Movies	Released: 1984	Documentary TV special on McCartney's career, narrated by Tom Bosley.
Give My Regards to Broad Street	Released: 23 October 1984 (theatrical); 1984 (Laserdisc); 1985 / 1996 (VHS); 20 April 2004 (DVD)	Movie written by and starring Paul McCartney, featuring a number of his original songs.
McCartney / A Portrait Special / The Paul McCartney Special (video title)	Released: 29 August 1986 (broadcast); 1986/87/88/89 (VHS/Laserdisc); 15 September 1993 (VHS)	TV special about McCartney, featuring him talking about his career from 1970 to 1986, to promote his then-new album Press to Play.
Once Upon a Video...	Released: 1987 (VHS/Laserdisc)	Compilation featuring four official music videos and two TV ads.
Put It There	Released: 10 June 1989 (broadcast); 1 September 1989 (VHS/Laserdisc); 2003 / 24 March 2017 (DVD)	Documentary on the making of the Flowers in the Dirt album.
From Rio to Liverpool	Released: 17 December 1990	Documentary TV special of The Paul McCartney World Tour, documenting the world-record beating performance at the Maracanã Stadium.
MTV Unplugged: Paul McCartney	Released: 3 April 1991	Concert TV special from MTV Unplugged Season 2: Episode 3.
Get Back	Released: 20 September 1991 (Europe); 25 October 1991 (US); 1991/92/93 (VHS/Laserdisc); 2001/2005 (DVD)	Concert taped in 45 cities and 13 countries, documenting the Paul McCartney World Tour.
Liverpool Oratorio	Released: 30 October 1991 (broadcast); 1991 (VHS/Laserdisc); 2004 (2× DVD)	Performance of the whole Liverpool Oratorio album on 28 June 1991, at the Liverpool Anglican Cathedral.
Paul McCartney: Up Close	Released: 12 April 1993	Concert TV special.
Movin' On	Released: 18 April 1993 (broadcast); 24 September 1993 / 1998 (VHS)	Documentary on the making of the album Off the Ground and preparing for The New World Tour.
Paul is Live in Concert on The New World Tour	Released: 15 June 1993 (broadcast); 22 March 1994 (VHS/Laserdisc); 2003 (DVD)	Concert filmed during the North American leg of The New World Tour.
In the World Tonight	Released: 6 October 1997 (VHS/Laserdisc/DVD)	Documentary on the making of the album Flaming Pie.
Standing Stone	Released: 27 November 1997 (broadcast); 1997 (UK VHS); 1999/2003/06 (Europe DVD); 18 January 2000 (US video)	Performance of the whole Standing Stone album and a "making of" documentary.
Here, There and Everywhere: A Concert for Linda	Released: 18 April 1999	Concert tribute to Linda McCartney who died from breast cancer exactly one year prior. Contains live performances from Paul McCartney, George Michael, Eddie Izzard, Tom Jones, Sinéad O'Connor, Marianne Faithfull, Des'ree and The Pretenders.
Paul McCartney & Friends Live: PETA's Millennium Concert / The PeTA Concert For Party Animals (video title)	Released: 16 October 1999 (broadcast); 4 September 2001 / 2002 / 2009 (DVD)	Live performance from 18 September 1999 of McCartney, but also featuring comedians, Sarah McLachlan, The B-52's and Chrissie Hynde.
Live at the Cavern Club!	Released: 14 December 1999 (live broadcast); 2000 (VHS/DVD); 19 June 2001 (DVD/VCD)	Concert at the Cavern Club, where McCartney played most of the Run Devil Run album plus "I Saw Her Standing There". Includes biographies of McCartney's bandmates on that day (David Gilmour, Ian Paice, Chris Hall, Pete Wingfield, and Mick Green) and History of the Cavern Club.
Working Classical by Paul McCartney	Released: 2 May 2000 (VHS)	Live performance of the London Symphony Orchestra and the Loma Mar Quartet at Philharmonic Hall, Liverpool. McCartney also shares his reflections on his roots and the making of the album Working Classical.
Wingspan – An Intimate Portrait	Released: 11 May 2001 (broadcast); 13 November 2001 (VHS/DVD)	Documentary about McCartney's post-Beatles musical career, focusing mostly on Wings.
The Concert for New York City	Released: 20 October 2001 (broadcast); 29 January 2002 (VHS/DVD)	Benefit concert organized by McCartney in response to the September 11 attacks and broadcast live from Madison Square Garden. Featuring six songs by McCartney including the new song "Freedom" and performances from David Bowie, The Who, Eric Clapton, Elton John, Billy Joel, Jagger/Richards and many more. There are appearances from The Clintons, Robert De Niro and a short film from Martin Scorsese.
There's Only One Paul McCartney	Released: 2 June 2002	Documentary TV special released by BBC that follows McCartney for a week and shows his history, culminating in a Buckingham Palace concert featuring many celebrity appearances.
Back in the U.S.	Released: 17 March 2003	Compiled from McCartney's two concert tours of North America in 2002. The video was certified 4× Platinum in Canada and Gold in Germany.
Paul McCartney in Red Square	Released: 18 September 2003 (broadcast); 14 June 2005 (DVD)	Concert with interviews that includes an extended 20-minute director's cut of previously unreleased footage, a behind-the-scenes featurette and the companion special Live in St. Petersburg.
Paul McCartney: Music & Animation	Released: 13 April 2004 / 27 September 2004 (DVD); 11 October 2011 (DVD)	Compilation of three animated shorts produced, mostly written, and with music by McCartney: Tropic Island Hum, Tuesday and Rupert and the Frog Song. Includes an interview with McCartney and a "making of" documentary. Narrated by Dustin Hoffman, some characters of the shorts are voiced by McCartney.
Between Chaos and Creation	Released: 12 September 2005 (UK DVD); 13 September 2005 (US DVD)	Documentary on the making of the album Chaos and Creation in the Backyard.
Chaos and Creation at Abbey Road	Released: 17 December 2005 (UK broadcast); 27 February 2006 (US broadcast)	Concert TV special at Abbey Road Studios. McCartney performs solo, tells stories about his life and songs, and demonstrates instruments and recording techniques.
The Space Within US	Released: 14 November 2006 (DVD); 18 November 2008 (Blu-ray)	Concert featuring interviews with McCartney, his band, and his US tour crew.
Memory Almost Full – Deluxe Edition	Released: 6 November 2007	The deluxe edition CD/DVD includes Live at the Electric Ballroom, London, 7 June 2007, and 2 music videos.
The McCartney Years	Released: 12 November 2007 (UK); 13 November 2007 (US)	DVD box-set that includes an exclusive commentary, behind the scenes footage, over 40 music videos, and historic live performances.
Live at the Olympia	Released: 2008 (DVD)	Concert TV special recorded at the Olympia in Paris, on 22 October 2007.
Ecce Cor Meum – Live at The Royal Albert Hall	Released: 20 February 2008 (broadcast)	Live performance of the whole classical music album Ecce Cor Meum.
Paul McCartney: Live in Kiev	Released: 5 July 2008	"Independence Concert" TV special of the 14 June record-setting show for 350,000, the largest Ukraine audience ever. It was the first time McCartney played in the country; a 33-song set from Maidan Nezalezhnosti.
Good Evening New York City	Released: 17 November 2009 (video); 26 November 2009 (broadcast)	Live concert from July 2009 at Citi Field, in New York.
Paul McCartney's Live Kisses	Released: 7 September 2012 (broadcast); 13 November 2012 (DVD/Blu-ray/Download)	Live performance from Capitol Studios of nearly the whole Kisses on the Bottom album.
New – Target Exclusive	Released: 15 October 2013	CD/DVD that includes the exclusive video A Rendez-Vous with Paul McCartney.
New – Collector's Edition	Released: 7 November 2014 (video); 4 December 2013 (broadcast)	The 2CD/DVD edition contains the documentary Something New directed by Don Letts, interviews, promo tour videos, 4 music videos and 3 making-of features.
A MusiCares Tribute to Paul McCartney	Released: 24 March 2015 (DVD/Blu-ray/Download)	MusiCares Person of the Year tribute performances featuring Cirque Du Soleil, Alicia Keys, Alison Krauss, Neil Young, Coldplay, Dave Grohl, James Taylor and 5 songs by McCartney.
Pure McCartney VR	Released: 10 June 2016	Virtual reality video collection directed by Tony Kaye for the Pure McCartney compilation.
Carpool Karaoke: When Corden Met McCartney Live from Liverpool	Released: 20 August 2018	Primetime special featuring never-before-seen footage from the "Paul McCartney Carpool Karaoke" segment on The Late Late Show with James Corden.
Live from Grand Central Station, NYC	Released: 7 September 2018	A "secret" concert at Grand Central Terminal that was live-streamed on YouTube.
The Bruce McMouse Show	Released: 7 December 2018 (DVD/Blu-ray); 21 January 2019 (theatrical)	Wings concert film with animation produced from 1972 to 1977
McCartney 3, 2, 1	Released: 16 July 2021	Documentary miniseries released by Hulu, featuring McCartney and producer Rick Rubin talking about McCartney's whole career.
Man on the Run	Released: 30 August 2025 (premiere); Released: 25 February 2026 (Amazon Prime Video)	Documentary focused on Paul McCartney's life while he was with Wings, it's narrated mainly by McCartney himself, among others.
McCartney: The Hunt for the Lost Bass	Released: 2 April 2026 (cinema); Released: 11 April 2026 (TV)	Documentary about the loss and rediscovery of Paul McCartney's iconic Höfner bass, narrated by McCartney himself, among others.

== Music videos ==
Year	Title	Director	Ref.
1970	"Maybe I'm Amazed"	Charlie Jenkins	
1971	"3 Legs"	Roy Benson	
1971	"Heart of the Country"	Roy Benson	
1972	"Mary Had a Little Lamb" (4 versions: Cartoon, Barn, Psychedelic, Circus)	Nicholas Ferguson	
1972	"Hi, Hi, Hi"	Steven Turner	
1972	"C Moon"	Steven Turner	
1973	"My Love"	Mick Rock	
1973	"Helen Wheels"	Roy Benson	
1974	"Mamunia" (animated)	Jim Quick	
1974	"Jet" (animated)	Jim Quick	
1974	"Band on the Run" (animated)	Michael Coulson	
1974	"Junior's Farm" (Top of the Pops)	Johnny Pearson and Bruce Milliard	
1975	"Letting Go"	Barry Chattington	
1976	"Silly Love Songs"	Gordon Bennett	
1976	"Maybe I'm Amazed" (live)	Gordon Bennett	
1977	"Mull of Kintyre" (version 1)	Michael Lindsay-Hogg	
1977	"Mull of Kintyre" (version 2)	Paul McCartney	
1977	"Mull of Kintyre" (version 3)	Nicholas Ferguson	
1978	"With a Little Luck"	Michael Lindsay-Hogg	
1978	"I've Had Enough"	Keith McMillan	
1978	"London Town"	Michael Lindsay-Hogg	
1979	"Goodnight Tonight"	Keith MacMillan	
1979	"Getting Closer"	Keith MacMillan	
1979	"Old Siam, Sir"	Keith MacMillan	
1979	"Baby's Request"	Keith MacMillan	
1979	"Wonderful Christmastime"	Russell Mulcahy	
1980	"Coming Up"	Keith MacMillan	
1980	"Waterfalls"	Keith MacMillan	
1982	"Ebony and Ivory"	Keith MacMillan	
1982	"Ebony and Ivory" (solo version)	Barry Myers	
1982	"Take It Away"	John McKenzie	
1982	"Tug of War"	Maurice Phillips	
1983	"Say Say Say"	Bob Giraldi	
1983	"Pipes of Peace"	Paul McCartney and Keith MacMillan	
1983	"So Bad"	Paul McCartney	
1984	"No More Lonely Nights" (special dance mix)	David G. Hillier	
1984	"We All Stand Together"	Geoff Dunbar	
1985	"Spies Like Us"	John Landis	
1986	"Press"	Philip Davey	
1986	"Stranglehold"	Bob Giraldi	
1986	"Pretty Little Head"	Steve Barron	
1986	"Only Love Remains"	Maurice Phillips	
1987	"Once Upon a Long Ago"	Paul McCartney and Mike Ross	
1989	"My Brave Face" (2 versions)	Roger Lunn	
1989	"This One" (version 1)	Tim Pope	
1989	"This One" (version 2)	Dean Chamberlain	
1989	"Où Est Le Soleil?"	David Lodge	
1989	"Figure of Eight" (3 versions)	Andy Morahan	
1989	"Party, Party"	Peter Brookes	
1990	"We Got Married"	Aubrey Powell	
1990	"Distractions"	Geoff Wonfor	
1990	"Birthday" (version 1)	Neil Mackenzie Mathews	
1990	"Birthday" (version 2)		
1990	"All My Trials"	Nigel Dick	
1990	"Put It There"	Neil Mackenzie Mathews	
1993	"Hope of Deliverance"	Andy Morahan	
1993	"Off the Ground"	Mathew Robins	
1993	"Deliverance" (Steve Anderson remix)	Richard Heslop	
1993	"C'mon People"	Kevin Godley	
1993	"Biker Like an Icon"	Richard Heslop	
1997	"The World Tonight" (version 1)	Alistair Donald	
1997	"The World Tonight" (version 2)	Geoff Wonfor	
1997	"Young Boy"	Alistair Donald	
1997	"Little Willow"	John Schlesinger	
1997	"Beautiful Night"	Julien Temple	
1999	"Brown Eyed Handsome Man"	David Leland	
1999	"No Other Baby"	Pedro Romhanyi	
2001	"From a Lover to a Friend"	Kate Miller	
2001	"Freedom"	Harris Savides, Albert Maysles and Louis J. Horvitz	
2001	"Your Loving Flame"	Gavin Gordon-Rogers	
2002	"Lonely Road"	Jonas Åkerlund	
2004	"Tropic Island Hum"	Geoff Dunbar	
2004	"In Liverpool"	Barry Chattington	
2005	"Fine Line" (2 versions)	Simon Hilton	
2005	"Jenny Wren"	Simon Hilton	
2007	"Dance Tonight"	Michel Gondry	
2007	"Ever Present Past"	Phil Griffin	
2007	"Nod Your Head"		
2007	"222"	Marco Sandeman	
2008	"Sing the Changes"	Marco Sandeman	
2009	"Dance 'til We're High"	Marco Sandeman	
2009	"(I Want to) Come Home"		
2011	"Blue Sway"	Jack McCoy	
2012	"My Valentine"	Paul McCartney	
2013	"Queenie Eye"	Simon Aboud	
2014	"Save Us"	Toru Uehara and Charlie Lightening	
2014	"Appreciate"	Andre Chocron	
2014	"Early Days"	Vincent Haycock	
2014	"Hope for the Future"	Daniel Askill	
2015	"FourFiveSeconds" (with Rihanna and Kanye West)	Inez and Vinoodh	
2015	"Say Say Say" (2015 remix)	Ryan Heffington	
2018	"Fuh You"	Simon Aboud	
2018	"Back in Brazil"	Charlie Lightening	
2018	"Come On to Me"	T.G. Herrington	
2018	"Who Cares"	Brantley Gutierrez and Ryan Heffington	
2020	"Find My Way"	Roman Coppola	
2020	"Winter Bird / When Winter Comes"	Geoff Dunbar	
2020	"The Kiss of Venus" (Dominic Fike version)	Jack Begert	
2021	"Slidin'"	Jack McCoy	
2021	"Find My Way" (featuring Beck)	Andrew Donoho	
2021	"Slidin'" (EOB Remix)	Jack McCoy	

== Documentary appearances ==
- 1968 All You Need Is Love: The Story of Popular Music by Tony Palmer
- 2011 The Love We Make by Albert Maysles – cinéma vérité documentary that showing film chronicles Paul McCartney's experiences in New York City after the 11 September attacks of 2001, following him as he prepared The Concert for New York City October 2001 benefit event.
- 2022 Squaring The Circle (The Story of Hipgnosis) by Anton Corbjin. A documentary film about the English art design group Hipgnosis, who created album designs for a number of artists from 1968 to 1983. McCartney features in the documentary, recalling Hipgnosis' involvement in the designs for Wings' albums Venus and Mars (1975), Wings at the Speed of Sound (1976), Wings over America (1976), Wings Greatest (1978), and London Town (1978).
