= The 7″ Singles Box =

The 7" Singles Box

Box set by Paul McCartney
- Released: 2 December 2022
- Recorded: 1970–2021
- Genre: Rock
- Length: 602:15 (digital version)
- Label: MPL
- Producers: Paul McCartney; Linda McCartney; Chris Thomas; George Martin; Hugh Padgham; Phil Ramone; Mitchell Froom; Neil Dorfsman; Chris Hughes; Ross Cullum; Julian Mendelsohn; Jeff Lynne; David Kahne; Nigel Godrich; Youth; Tommy LiPuma; Paul Epworth; Ethan Johns; Mark Ronson; Greg Kurstin; Ryan Tedder

Paul McCartney chronology
McCartney I II III (2022)	The 7" Singles Box (2022)	One Hand Clapping (2024)

Singles from The 7" Singles Box
- 1. "Uncle Albert/Admiral Halsey (Mono)" Released: 10 November 2022; 2. "Too Many People (Mono)" Released: 10 November 2022

Alternative cover
- Cover of the digital version

Professional ratings
Review scores
Source	Rating
Pitchfork	7.4/10

The 7" Singles Box Set is a box set by Paul McCartney released in December 2022, containing 80 seven-inch vinyl singles originally released between 1971 and 2022. The release does not include all the singles McCartney published during that period, but rather a personally curated selection. The box set was packaged in a wooden crate manufactured in the United Kingdom and limited to only 3000 units worldwide. The box set sold out upon announcement by McCartney. It was also made available on various digital platforms.

== Background ==
The box set was announced building upon an eventful 2022 for Paul McCartney, from the Got Back tour in late spring, his eightieth birthday on 18 June, his headlining the Glastonbury Festival a week later on 25 June, and the 5 August release of McCartney I II III, another box set collection bringing together the "McCartney trilogy" in McCartney, McCartney II, and McCartney III.

An introduction for the box set was written by longtime Rolling Stone editor Rob Sheffield and published ahead of its release on McCartney's website. In the introduction, Sheffield celebrated and complimented the box set and its capability to tell McCartney's biography: "The 7" Singles Box tells McCartney’s life story in 80 vinyl singles, right after his 80th birthday. It starts with "Another Day" from 1971, his first 45 after the Beatles. It carries through his one-of-a-kind career, from Wings up to McCartney III. These singles add up to a sprawling saga—an epic, really. It's no ordinary way to tell the story of a life, but then, this is no ordinary life."

Tracks on the box set for the most part use masters of the Paul McCartney Archive Collection reissues and Pure McCartney compilation album for previously released tracks, while newly available tracks feature new masters.

== Release ==
The box set includes 163 tracks across the 80 seven-inch vinyl singles, while a digital counterpart includes only 159 tracks removing duplicates or re-releases of tracks on future singles.

Several tracks are exclusive to the box set due to the fact that some singles have never been released on 7" or physically: "Secret Friend" (7" Single Edit), "Dance Tonight" (Demo) and "(I Want to) Come Home" (Demo).

With the announcement of the box set, mono versions of "Uncle Albert/Admiral Halsey" and "Too Many People" from Ram were released as single tracks on digital platforms.

The extensive booklet features an essay by music journalist and author Rob Sheffield, as well as liner notes and label copy by MPL. Additional research was provided by Italian journalist, author and McCartney historian Luca Perasi.

== Track listing ==
All tracks are written by Paul McCartney, except where noted.

Digital version
No.	Title	Writer(s)	Release	Length
1.	"Another Day"	Paul McCartney and Linda McCartney	1971 non-album single	3:43
2.	"Oh Woman, Oh Why"		1971 non-album single	4:35
3.	"Uncle Albert/Admiral Halsey" (Mono)	P. McCartney, L. McCartney	Ram	4:50
4.	"Too Many People" (Mono)	P. McCartney, L. McCartney	Ram	4:18
5.	"The Back Seat of My Car"		Ram	4:30
6.	"Heart of the Country"	P. McCartney, L. McCartney	Ram	2:24
7.	"Love Is Strange" (Single Edit)	Ellas McDaniel, Mickey Baker, Sylvia Robinson	Wild Life	4:15
8.	"I Am Your Singer"	P. McCartney, L. McCartney	Wild Life	2:17
9.	"Give Ireland Back to the Irish"	P. McCartney, L. McCartney	1972 non-album single	3:46
10.	"Give Ireland Back to the Irish" (Version)	P. McCartney, L. McCartney	1972 non-album single	3:47
11.	"Mary Had a Little Lamb"	P. McCartney, L. McCartney	1972 non-album single	3:33
12.	"Little Woman Love"	P. McCartney, L. McCartney	1972 non-album single	2:08
13.	"Hi, Hi, Hi"	P. McCartney, L. McCartney	1972 non-album single	3:10
14.	"C Moon"	P. McCartney, L. McCartney	1972 non-album single	4:36
15.	"My Love"	P. McCartney, L. McCartney	Red Rose Speedway	4:10
16.	"The Mess" (Live at The Hague)	P. McCartney, L. McCartney	1973 non-album single	4:58
17.	"Live and Let Die"	P. McCartney, L. McCartney	1973 non-album single	3:14
18.	"I Lie Around"	P. McCartney, L. McCartney	1973 non-album single	5:03
19.	"Helen Wheels"	P. McCartney, L. McCartney	1973 non-album single	3:46
20.	"Country Dreamer"	P. McCartney, L. McCartney	1973 non-album single	3:11
21.	"Jet"	P. McCartney, L. McCartney	Band on the Run	4:09
22.	"Let Me Roll It"	P. McCartney, L. McCartney	Band on the Run	4:50
23.	"Band on the Run"	P. McCartney, L. McCartney	Band on the Run	5:13
24.	"Nineteen Hundred and Eighty-Five"	P. McCartney, L. McCartney	Band on the Run	5:31
25.	"Mrs. Vandebilt"	P. McCartney, L. McCartney	Band on the Run	4:40
26.	"Bluebird"	P. McCartney, L. McCartney	Band on the Run	3:24
27.	"Junior's Farm"	P. McCartney, L. McCartney	1974 non-album single	4:22
28.	"Sally G"	P. McCartney, L. McCartney	1974 non-album single	3:40
29.	"Listen to What the Man Said"	P. McCartney, L. McCartney	Venus and Mars	3:56
30.	"Love in Song"	P. McCartney, L. McCartney	Venus and Mars	3:06
31.	"Letting Go" (7" Single Mix)	P. McCartney, L. McCartney	Venus and Mars	3:36
32.	"You Gave Me the Answer"	P. McCartney, L. McCartney	Venus and Mars	2:15
33.	"Venus and Mars/Rock Show" (7" Single Edit)	P. McCartney, L. McCartney	Venus and Mars	3:47
34.	"Magneto and Titanium Man"	P. McCartney, L. McCartney	Venus and Mars	3:17
35.	"Silly Love Songs"	P. McCartney, L. McCartney	Wings at the Speed of Sound	5:55
36.	"Cook of the House"	P. McCartney, L. McCartney	Wings at the Speed of Sound	2:40
37.	"Let 'Em In"	P. McCartney, L. McCartney	Wings at the Speed of Sound	5:11
38.	"Beware My Love" (7" Single Edit)	P. McCartney, L. McCartney	Wings at the Speed of Sound	6:01
39.	"Maybe I'm Amazed" (Live)		Wings over America	5:20
40.	"Soily" (Live)	P. McCartney, L. McCartney	Wings over America	5:44
41.	"Mull of Kintyre"	McCartney, Denny Laine	1977 non-album single	4:45
42.	"Girls' School"		1977 non-album single	4:38
43.	"With a Little Luck" (DJ Edit)		1978 non-album single	3:13
44.	"Backwards Traveller/Cuff Link"		1978 non-album single	3:12
45.	"I've Had Enough"		London Town	3:05
46.	"Deliver Your Children"	McCartney, Laine	London Town	4:19
47.	"London Town"	McCartney, Laine	London Town	4:11
48.	"I'm Carrying"		London Town	2:46
49.	"Goodnight Tonight" (Single Version)		1979 non-album single	4:21
50.	"Daytime Nighttime Suffering"		1979 non-album single	3:23
51.	"Old Siam, Sir"		Back to the Egg	4:13
52.	"Spin It On"		Back to the Egg	2:15
53.	"Getting Closer"		Back to the Egg	3:24
54.	"Baby's Request"		Back to the Egg	2:51
55.	"Arrow Through Me" (7" B-side is "Old Siam, Sir")		Back to the Egg	3:38
56.	"Wonderful Christmastime" (Edited Version)		1979 non-album single	3:48
57.	"Rudolph the Red-Nosed Reggae"	Johnny Marks	1979 non-album single	1:47
58.	"Coming Up"		McCartney II	3:52
59.	"Coming Up" (Live at Glasgow)		1980 non-album single	3:50
60.	"Lunch Box/Odd Sox"	P. McCartney, L. McCartney	1980 non-album single	3:54
61.	"Waterfalls"		McCartney II	4:45
62.	"Check My Machine"		1980 non-album single	5:51
63.	"Temporary Secretary"		McCartney II	3:15
64.	"Secret Friend" (7" Single Edit)		1980 non-album single	5:14
65.	"Ebony and Ivory"		Tug of War	3:45
66.	"Rainclouds"	McCartney, Laine	1982 non-album single	3:13
67.	"Take It Away"		Tug of War	4:02
68.	"I'll Give You a Ring"		1982 non-album single	3:06
69.	"Tug of War"		Tug of War	4:07
70.	"Get It"		Tug of War	2:30
71.	"Say Say Say"	McCartney, Michael Jackson	Pipes of Peace	3:57
72.	"Ode to a Koala Bear"		1983 non-album single	3:47
73.	"Pipes of Peace" (7" Single Edit)		Pipes of Peace	3:28
74.	"So Bad"		Pipes of Peace	3:22
75.	"No More Lonely Nights"		Give My Regards to Broad Street	4:43
76.	"No More Lonely Nights" (Playout Version)		Give My Regards to Broad Street	3:58
77.	"We All Stand Together" (feat. The Frog Chorus)		Rupert and the Frog Song	4:25
78.	"We All Stand Together" (feat. The Finchley Frogettes / Humming Version)		Rupert and the Frog Song	2:24
79.	"Spies Like Us"		1985 non-album single	4:47
80.	"My Carnival"	P. McCartney, L. McCartney	1985 non-album single	3:59
81.	"Press" (Video Edit)		Press to Play	3:41
82.	"It's Not True"		1986 non-album single	4:30
83.	"Pretty Little Head" (Remix)	McCartney, Eric Stewart	Press to Play	3:51
84.	"Write Away"	McCartney, Stewart	1986 non-album single	3:01
85.	"Stranglehold"	McCartney, Stewart	Press to Play	3:38
86.	"Angry" (Remix)	McCartney, Stewart	Press to Play	3:37
87.	"Only Love Remains" (Remix)		Press to Play	4:14
88.	"Tough on a Tightrope"	McCartney, Stewart	1986 non-album single	4:40
89.	"Once Upon a Long Ago"		All the Best!	4:16
90.	"Back on My Feet"	McCartney, Elvis Costello	1987 non-album single	4:23
91.	"My Brave Face"	McCartney, Costello	Flowers in the Dirt	3:19
92.	"Flying to My Home"		1989 non-album single	4:14
93.	"This One"		Flowers in the Dirt	4:12
94.	"The First Stone"	McCartney, Hamish Stuart	1989 non-album single	4:06
95.	"Figure of Eight" (7" Bob Clearmountain mix)		Flowers in the Dirt	5:13
96.	"Où Est le Soleil"		1989 non-album single	4:53
97.	"Party Party" (7" B-side is an artwork etching)	P. McCartney, L. McCartney, Chris Whitten, Paul Wickens, Robbie McIntosh, and Hamish Stuart	Flowers in the Dirt (Bonus Track)	5:32
98.	"Put It There"		Flowers in the Dirt	2:11
99.	"Mama's Little Girl"	P. McCartney, L. McCartney	1990 non-album single	3:47
100.	"The Long and Winding Road" (Live)	Paul McCartney and John Lennon	Tripping the Live Fantastic	4:09
101.	"C Moon" (Live)	P. McCartney, L. McCartney	1990 non-album single	3:45
102.	"Birthday" (Live)	Paul McCartney and John Lennon	Tripping the Live Fantastic	2:50
103.	"Good Day Sunshine" (Live)	Paul McCartney and John Lennon	1990 non-album single	2:33
104.	"All My Trials" (7" B-side is "C Moon")		Tripping the Live Fantastic: Highlights!	3:28
105.	"The World You're Coming Into"		Paul McCartney's Liverpool Oratorio	2:30
106.	"Tres Conejos"		Paul McCartney's Liverpool Oratorio	2:43
107.	"Save the Child" (as "Do We Live in a World...")		Paul McCartney's Liverpool Oratorio	3:27
108.	"The Drinking Song (Let's Find Ourselves a Little Hostelry)"		Paul McCartney's Liverpool Oratorio	2:06
109.	"Hope of Deliverance"		Off the Ground	3:24
110.	"Long Leather Coat"	P. McCartney, L. McCartney	1992 non-album single	3:36
111.	"C'Mon People"		Off the Ground	5:49
112.	"I Can't Imagine"		1993 non-album single	4:40
113.	"Young Boy" (feat. Steve Miller)		Flaming Pie	3:56
114.	"Looking For You" (feat. Jeff Lynne and Ringo Starr)		1997 non-album single	4:41
115.	"The World Tonight" (feat. Jeff Lynne)		Flaming Pie	4:06
116.	"Used to Be Bad" (feat. Steve Miller)	McCartney, Steve Miller	Flaming Pie	4:13
117.	"Beautiful Night" (feat. Jeff Lynne, Ringo Starr, and Linda McCartney)		Flaming Pie	5:06
118.	"Love Come Tumbling Down"		1997 non-album single	4:24
119.	"No Other Baby"	Dick Bishop, Bob Watson	Run Devil Run	4:18
120.	"Brown Eyed Handsome Man"	Chuck Berry	Run Devil Run	2:29
121.	"Fabulous"	Harold Land, Jon Sheldon	1999 non-album single	2:16
122.	"From a Lover to a Friend"		Driving Rain	3:50
123.	"Riding into Jaipur"		Driving Rain	4:09
124.	"Tropic Island Hum" (7" B-side is "We All Stand Together")		2004 non-album single	3:14
125.	"Fine Line"		Chaos and Creation in the Backyard	3:07
126.	"Growing Up Falling Down"		2005 non-album single	3:28
127.	"Jenny Wren"		Chaos and Creation in the Backyard	3:48
128.	"Summer of '59"		2005 non-album single	2:10
129.	"Dance Tonight"		Memory Almost Full	2:56
130.	"Dance Tonight" (Demo)		Memory Almost Full	2:57
131.	"Nod Your Head"		Memory Almost Full	1:58
132.	"222"		Memory Almost Full (Deluxe Edition)	3:40
133.	"Ever Present Past"		Memory Almost Full	2:57
134.	"House of Wax" (Live)		2007 non-album single	5:19
135.	"Sing the Changes"		Electric Arguments	3:45
136.	"Nothing Too Much Just Out of Sight" (Radio Edit)		Electric Arguments	3:46
137.	"(I Want to) Come Home"		2010 non-album single	3:36
138.	"(I Want to) Come Home" (Demo)		2010 non-album single	3:37
139.	"My Valentine"		Kisses on the Bottom	3:16
140.	"Get Yourself Another Fool"	Haywood Henry, Monroe Tucker	Kisses on the Bottom	4:43
141.	"The Christmas Song (Chestnuts Roasting on an Open Fire)" (7" B-side is "Wonderful Christmastime")	Mel Tormé, Robert Wells	Kisses on the Bottom - Complete Kisses	3:36
142.	"New"		New	2:58
143.	"Early Days"		New	4:08
144.	"Queenie Eye"	McCartney, Paul Epworth	New	3:48
145.	"Save Us"	McCartney, Epworth	New	2:40
146.	"Hope for the Future" (Main)		2014 non-album single	4:09
147.	"Hope for the Future" (Thrash)		2014 non-album single	2:56
148.	"In the Blink of an Eye"		Ethel & Ernest Soundtrack	3:20
149.	"Walking in the Park with Eloise"	James McCartney	Ethel & Ernest Soundtrack	2:14
150.	"I Don't Know"		Egypt Station	4:27
151.	"Come On to Me"		Egypt Station	4:11
152.	"Who Cares"		Egypt Station	3:15
153.	"Fuh You"	McCartney, Ryan Tedder	Egypt Station	3:25
154.	"Home Tonight"		2019 non-album single	3:05
155.	"In a Hurry"		2019 non-album single	4:04
156.	"Find My Way"		McCartney III	3:53
157.	"Winter Bird/When Winter Comes"		McCartney III	3:14
158.	"Women and Wives"		McCartney III	2:54
159.	"Women and Wives" (St. Vincent Remix)		McCartney III Imagined	3:02
Total length:				602:15

== Charts ==
Chart performance for The 7" Singles Box
Chart (2022)	Peak position
US Billboard 200	126
US Top Rock Albums (Billboard)	13
