= The McCartney Years =

Video by Paul McCartney
- Released: 12 November 2007
- Recorded: 15 February 1970 – April 2005
- Genre: Rock
- Label: MPL; Rhino (U.S.); Warner Music Entertainment (outside U.S)
- Director: Various
- Producer: Various

Paul McCartney chronology
The Space Within US (2006)	The McCartney Years (2007)	Good Evening New York City (2009)

The McCartney Years is a three-DVD set featuring music videos, live performances and other rare footage from Paul McCartney's solo career and Wings. The compilation was released by Warner Music in the UK on 12 November 2007, and by Rhino Entertainment in the United States the following day.

== Content ==
The first two discs comprise promotional films, from "Maybe I'm Amazed" (1970) to "Fine Line" (2005); with the exception of "Stranglehold", "Again, and Again and Again", "Spin It On", "The World Tonight" and "Young Boy". Additional features include a documentary about his recent album Chaos and Creation in the Backyard (Creating Chaos at Abbey Road), a film about the Band on the Run album and a feature-length audio commentary from McCartney himself.

The third disc includes seven songs from the 1976 Wings concert Rockshow, four songs from McCartney's 1991 appearance on MTV Unplugged, and 11 performances from his 2004 set at Glastonbury Festival. The live footage is also complemented by an optional commentary by McCartney.

Other features includes McCartney's appearance at Live Aid in 1985, the Super Bowl XXXIX Halftime Show and interviews with Melvyn Bragg and Michael Parkinson.

== Track listing ==
=== Disc 1 ===
1. "Tug of War"
2. "Say Say Say"
3. "Silly Love Songs"
4. "Band on the Run"
5. "Maybe I'm Amazed"
6. "Heart of the Country"
7. "Mamunia"
8. "With a Little Luck"
9. "Goodnight Tonight"
10. "Waterfalls"
11. "My Love"
12. "C Moon"
13. "Baby's Request"
14. "Hi, Hi, Hi"
15. "Ebony and Ivory"
16. "Take It Away"
17. "Mull of Kintyre"
18. "Helen Wheels"
19. "I've Had Enough"
20. "Coming Up"
21. "Wonderful Christmastime"

Extras

- "Eleanor's Dream" ("Eleanor Rigby")
- "Band on the Run" (Version two)

Includes cover's photo shoot, as well as samples of "Nineteen Hundred and Eighty-Five", "Mrs. Vandebilt" and "Bluebird".

- "Junior's Farm"
- "London Town"
- "Mull of Kintyre" (Elstree studios)

=== Disc 2 ===
1. "Pipes of Peace"
2. "My Brave Face"
3. "Beautiful Night"
4. "Fine Line"
5. "No More Lonely Nights"
6. "This One"
7. "Little Willow"
8. "Pretty Little Head"
9. "Birthday" (live)
10. "Hope of Deliverance"
11. "Once Upon a Long Ago"
12. "All My Trials"
13. "Brown Eyed Handsome Man"
14. "Press"
15. "No Other Baby"
16. "Off the Ground"
17. "Biker Like an Icon"
18. "Spies Like Us"
19. "Put It There"
20. "Figure of Eight"
21. "C'Mon People"

Extras

- Excerpts from Parkinson
- "So Bad"
- "Creating Chaos at Abbey Road"

=== Disc 3 ===
Rockshow

1. "Venus and Mars"
2. "Rock Show"
3. "Jet"
4. "Maybe I'm Amazed"
5. "Lady Madonna"
6. "Listen to What the Man Said"
7. "Bluebird"

MTV Unplugged

1. "I Lost My Little Girl"
2. "Every Night"
3. "And I Love Her"
4. "That Would Be Something"

Glastonbury

1. "Jet"
2. "Flaming Pie"
3. "Let Me Roll It"
4. "Blackbird"
5. "Band on the Run"
6. "Back in the U.S.S.R."
7. "Live and Let Die"
8. "Hey Jude"
9. "Yesterday"
10. "Helter Skelter"
11. "Sgt. Pepper's Lonely Hearts Club Band (Reprise)" / "The End"

Extras

- Live Aid performance
1. "Let It Be"
- Super Bowl XXXIX Halftime Performance
1. "Drive My Car"
2. "Get Back"
3. "Live and Let Die"
4. "Hey Jude"

== Hidden extras ==
Some videos on the first two discs have different angles, because one angle is an edited version of the original; the other the original. On disc one, "Goodnight Tonight" and "Baby's Request" have different angles. The edited angle on "Goodnight Tonight" has an old film effect, but include different shots from the original, unedited video. The edited angle on "Baby's Request" is full screen, but it is in sepia and resembles a video from a film projector. The second disc's different angle is McCartney's 2005 "Fine Line", where most of the video is just white with slight outlines of McCartney playing the instrument with bits of colour and a few seconds of live-action from the original music video appearing later.
