= The Paul McCartney Collection =

Box set by Paul McCartney
- Released: 7 June 1993 (first half); 9 August 1993 (second half)
- Recorded: 1 December 1969 – 12 January 1989
- Genre: Rock
- Length: 746:12
- Label: Parlophone
- Producers: Paul McCartney; Chris Thomas; George Martin; Hugh Padgham; Mitchell Froom; Neil Dorfsman; Elvis Costello; Trevor Horn; Steve Lipson; Chris Hughes; Ross Cullum; David Foster; Phil Ramone

Paul McCartney chronology
Off the Ground (1993)	The Paul McCartney Collection (1993)	Paul Is Live (1993)

The Paul McCartney Collection is a series of 16 remastered CDs by Paul McCartney of his solo and Wings albums, with most adding bonus tracks. The albums in the collection were released separately, with the first eight released on 7 June 1993, and the remainder on 9 August of the same year. The first half comprised albums from McCartney (1970) to London Town (1978), and the second half Wings Greatest (1978) to Flowers in the Dirt (1989). A box set of all 16 discs was subsequently released in the Japanese Beatles Fan Club.

These re-issues did not include McCartney's most recent studio album, Off the Ground, released in February 1993, and were not released in the United States.

== Contents ==
Disc no.	Album	Bonus tracks
1	McCartney	
2	Ram	"Another Day"; "Oh Woman, Oh Why"
3	Wild Life	"Give Ireland Back to the Irish"; "Mary Had a Little Lamb"; "Little Woman Love"; "Mama's Little Girl"
4	Red Rose Speedway	"Hi, Hi, Hi"; "C Moon"; "The Mess"; "I Lie Around"
5	Band on the Run	"Helen Wheels"; "Country Dreamer"
6	Venus and Mars	"Zoo Gang"; "Lunch Box/Odd Sox"; "My Carnival"
7	Wings at the Speed of Sound	"Walking in the Park with Eloise"; "Bridge Over the River Suite"; "Sally G"
8	London Town	"Mull of Kintyre"; "Girls' School"
9	Wings Greatest	
10	Back to the Egg	"Daytime Nighttime Suffering"; "Wonderful Christmastime"; "Rudolph the Red-Nosed Reggae"
11	McCartney II	"Goodnight Tonight"; "Check My Machine"; "Secret Friend"
12	Tug of War	
13	Pipes of Peace	"We All Stand Together"; "Twice in a Lifetime"; "Simple as That"
14	Give My Regards to Broad Street	"No More Lonely Nights" (extended version); "No More Lonely Nights" (special dance mix)
15	Press to Play	"Spies Like Us"; "Once Upon a Long Ago" (Long version)
16	Flowers in the Dirt	"Back on My Feet"; "Flying to My Home"; "Loveliest Thing"
