= Flying to My Home =

Single by Paul McCartney
- A-side: "My Brave Face" (7" and 12"); "Flying to My Home" (12" only)
- B-side: "Flying to My Home" (7" only); "I'm Gonna Be a Wheel Someday"/"Ain't That a Shame" (12")
- Released: 8 May 1989 (United Kingdom); 27 May 1989 (United States)
- Recorded: 5 May 1988
- Studio: Hog Hill Mill (Icklesham, UK)
- Genre: Rock
- Label: Capitol Records (US/Canada); Parlophone
- Songwriter: Paul McCartney
- Producer: Paul McCartney

Paul McCartney singles chronology
"Once Upon a Long Ago" (1987)	"Flying to My Home" (1989)	"This One" (1989)

"Flying to My Home" is a song written by Paul McCartney. It was released as the B-side to the "My Brave Face" single from the album Flowers in the Dirt. The song ended up being placed in the Paul McCartney lyrics book titled Blackbird Singing numerous years following its initial release. The song is available on the 1993 remastered CD version of Flowers in the Dirt. It was also included on The 7" Singles Box in 2022.

== Personnel ==
According to The Paul McCartney Project

- Paul McCartney – lead vocals, backing vocals, bass, electric and acoustic guitar, autoharp
- Linda McCartney – backing vocals
- Hamish Stuart – slide guitar, synthesizer, backing vocals
- Chris Whitten – drums, backing vocals
