= CHOBA B CCCP =

1988 studio album by Paul McCartney

Сно́ва в СССР

Studio album by Paul McCartney
- Released: 31 October 1988 (USSR)
- Recorded: 20–21 July 1987
- Studios: Hog Hill Mill (Icklesham, UK)
- Genre: Rock and roll
- Length: 38:38 (11-track edition) 47:54 (13-track edition) 50:20 (14-track edition)
- Label: Melodiya (Мелодия)
- Producer: Paul McCartney

Paul McCartney chronology
All the Best! (1987)	Сно́ва в СССР (1988)	Flowers in the Dirt (1989)

Paul McCartney studio album chronology
Press to Play (1986)	Сно́ва в СССР (1988)	Flowers in the Dirt (1989)

CHOBA B CCCP (Russian: Сно́ва в СССР, romanized: Snóva v SSSR, IPA: [ˈsnovə ˈv‿ɛsɛsɛsˈɛr], lit. 'Back in the USSR'; also known as The Russian Album) is the eighth solo studio album by the English musician Paul McCartney, released on 31 October 1988 exclusively in the Soviet Union. The album consists of live-in-studio recordings of covers, mainly rock and roll oldies. The first pressing contained 11 tracks, the second contained 13 tracks. With a tracklist of 14 songs, the album was released internationally on 30 September 1991.

== Background and recording ==
Following the tepid reaction to his 1986 studio album Press to Play, McCartney spent much of the first half of 1987 plotting his next album. In March he recorded an album's worth of songs with producer Phil Ramone, but those sessions only produced the single "Once Upon a Long Ago" backed with "Back on My Feet", released only in the United Kingdom that November.

Following a series of jam sessions with various British musicians where they played some of his favourite songs from the 1950s, McCartney decided to record the songs live in the studio. Over the course of two days in July 1987, McCartney recorded twenty songs.

Other tracks recorded during the sessions but not included on the Melodiya album were "I'm in Love Again" (though it was included on the subsequent international release) and "I Wanna Cry" (an original song) released on the B-side of McCartney's "This One" maxi-single in 1989, as well as "It's Now or Never" on the New Musical Express album The Last Temptation of Elvis in 1990. A version of the Beatles' "I Saw Her Standing There" was also recorded but remains unreleased.

== Title and artwork ==
The title «Снова в СССР» (Snova v SSSR) is Russian for "Back in the U.S.S.R.", the name of a 1968 Beatles song. The album is also known as Back in the USSR and the Russian Album. The first word of the album's title is often mispronounced by English speakers as /ˈtʃoʊbə/ rather than the more accurate /ˈsnoʊvə/ (the Cyrillic alphabet has a different pronunciation for the characters "С", "H", and "В" than the Latin alphabet).

The cover was designed by Michael Ross. The Russian release includes liner notes written by Roy Carr of New Musical Express, translated into Russian.

In the first year of release the album sold more than 400,000 copies.

== Release ==
McCartney originally wanted to release the album in the United Kingdom outside regular distribution channels, making it appear as if the album had been smuggled in from the Soviet Union. EMI turned down that idea. Nonetheless, McCartney's manager had a batch of LPs pressed, with Russian-language covers, as a Christmas present to McCartney. This gave McCartney the idea to release the album in the Soviet Union as a gesture of peace in the spirit of glasnost. An agreement was reached with the Soviet government-run record company Melodiya to license 400,000 copies of the album for release in the Soviet Union only with no exports. The album was released in the Soviet Union on 31 October 1988. The first pressing of 50,000 copies contained 11 tracks and sold out almost immediately. A second pressing with two additional tracks, "I'm Gonna Be a Wheel Someday" and "Summertime", was released about a month later.

Soon after its release, the album began appearing for sale outside the Soviet Union for prices ranging from $100 to $250 in the United States and up to £500 in the United Kingdom. The album was eventually given a worldwide release in 1991 as a 14-track album featuring "I'm in Love Again" as an additional track not available on USSR editions. On this release, the title is misprinted as СНОВА Б СССР (Б is the Cyrillic equivalent of the letter B in the Latin alphabet, rather than the В, equivalent to V, of the original). It reached #63 in the UK and #109 in the US.

Despite the fact that the album was not initially released in Western markets, half of the album's songs were released as B-sides from 1987 to 1989: "Midnight Special", "Don't Get Around Much Anymore", "Lawdy Miss Clawdy" and "Kansas City" appeared on various versions of "Once Upon a Long Ago", "I'm Gonna Be a Wheel Someday" and "Ain't That a Shame" on "My Brave Face" and an edited version of "I'm in Love Again" on "This One" single.

In 2019 Capitol Records reissued a newly mastered edition of the album in the form of the original 11-track Melodija-vinyl release. It was remastered at Abbey Road Studios as part of the McCartney catalogue re-releases through Capitol Records and part of the live-bundle. CHOBA B CCCP was released as a live-in-studio-album. Each of the four re-released albums came out on CD, vinyl, limited-edition coloured vinyl and digital download.

== Reception ==
Professional ratings
Review scores
Source	Rating
AllMusic	2/5 stars
The Encyclopedia of Popular Music	3/5 stars
The Essential Rock Discography	4/10
MusicHound	4/5 stars
The Rolling Stone Album Guide	3.5/5 stars

Rhapsody praised the album, calling it one of their favourite cover albums.

== Track listing ==
Soviet Union vinyl edition Side one
No.	Title	Writer(s)	Length
1.	"Kansas City"	Jerry Leiber, Mike Stoller	4:02
2.	"Twenty Flight Rock"	Eddie Cochran, Ned Fairchild	3:03
3.	"Lawdy, Miss Clawdy"	Lloyd Price	3:17
4.	"Bring It On Home to Me"	Sam Cooke	3:14
5.	"Lucille"	Richard Penniman, Albert Collins	3:13
6.	"Don't Get Around Much Anymore"	Duke Ellington, Bob Russell	2:51

Side two
No.	Title	Writer(s)	Length
1.	"That's All Right Mama"	Arthur Crudup	3:47
2.	"Ain't That a Shame"	Fats Domino, Dave Bartholomew	3:43
3.	"Crackin' Up"	Ellas McDaniel	3:55
4.	"Just Because"	Bob Shelton, Joe Shelton, Sydney Robin	3:34
5.	"Midnight Special"	Traditional; arranged by Paul McCartney	3:59

13-track edition Side one
No.	Title	Writer(s)	Length
1.	"Kansas City"	Jerry Leiber, Mike Stoller	4:02
2.	"Twenty Flight Rock"	Eddie Cochran, Ned Fairchild	3:03
3.	"Lawdy, Miss Clawdy"	Lloyd Price	3:17
4.	"Bring It On Home to Me"	Sam Cooke	3:14
5.	"Lucille"	Richard Penniman, Albert Collins	3:13
6.	"Don't Get Around Much Anymore"	Duke Ellington, Bob Russell	2:51
7.	"I'm Gonna Be a Wheel Someday"	Fats Domino, Dave Bartholomew, Roy Hayes	4:12

Side two
No.	Title	Writer(s)	Length
1.	"That's All Right Mama"	Arthur Crudup	3:47
2.	"Summertime"	George Gershwin, DuBose Heyward, Ira Gershwin	4:57
3.	"Ain't That a Shame"	Fats Domino, Dave Bartholomew	3:43
4.	"Crackin' Up"	Ellas McDaniel	3:55
5.	"Just Because"	Bob Shelton, Joe Shelton, Sydney Robin	3:34
6.	"Midnight Special"	Traditional; arranged by Paul McCartney	3:59

International CD edition
No.	Title	Writer(s)	Length
1.	"Kansas City"	Jerry Leiber, Mike Stoller	4:02
2.	"Twenty Flight Rock"	Eddie Cochran, Ned Fairchild	3:03
3.	"Lawdy, Miss Clawdy"	Lloyd Price	3:17
4.	"I'm in Love Again"	Fats Domino, Dave Bartholomew	2:58
5.	"Bring It On Home to Me"	Sam Cooke	3:14
6.	"Lucille"	Richard Penniman, Albert Collins	3:13
7.	"Don't Get Around Much Anymore"	Duke Ellington, Bob Russell	2:51
8.	"I'm Gonna Be a Wheel Someday"	Fats Domino, Dave Bartholomew, Roy Hayes	4:12
9.	"That's All Right Mama"	Arthur Crudup	3:47
10.	"Summertime"	George Gershwin, DuBose Heyward, Ira Gershwin	4:57
11.	"Ain't That a Shame"	Fats Domino, Dave Bartholomew	3:43
12.	"Crackin' Up"	Ellas McDaniel	3:55
13.	"Just Because"	Bob Shelton, Joe Shelton, Sydney Robin	3:34
14.	"Midnight Special"	Traditional; arranged by Paul McCartney	3:59

== Personnel ==
All tracks recorded 20 July 1987 except "Don't Get Around Much Anymore", "Ain't That a Shame" and "Crackin' Up", recorded on 21 July.

20 July

- Paul McCartney – bass guitar, vocals
- Mick Green – guitar
- Mick Gallagher – piano
- Chris Whitten – drums

21 July

- Paul McCartney – guitar, vocals
- Nick Garvey – bass guitar, backing vocals
- Mick Gallagher – keyboards
- Henry Spinetti – drums

== Charts ==
Year	Country	Chart	Position
1991	Japan	Oricon Weekly Albums Chart (Top 100)	48
1991	United Kingdom	UK Albums Chart (Top 75)	63
1991	United States	The Billboard 200	109

=== Monthly charts ===
Monthly chart performance for CHOBA B CCCP
Chart (1989)	Peak position
Soviet Albums (Moskovskij Komsomolets)	3

=== Year-end charts ===
Year-end chart performance for CHOBA B CCCP
Chart (1988)	Peak position
Soviet Albums (Moskovskij Komsomolets)	8
