= Stranglehold (disambiguation) =

A stranglehold is a grappling hold that strangles the opponent.

Stranglehold may also refer to:

== Music ==
- "Stranglehold" (Ted Nugent song), a 1975 song by Ted Nugent
- "Stranglehold" (Paul McCartney song), a 1986 single by Paul McCartney
- "Stranglehold", a song by British punk band UK Subs
- Stranglehold, a punk rock band with Taang! Records

== Films and TV ==
- Stranglehold (1931 film), a 1931 British film by Henry Edwards
- Stranglehold (1963 film), a 1963 British film by Lawrence Huntington
- Stranglehold (1994 film), a 1994 American film by Cirio H. Santiago
- "Stranglehold" (Decoy), a 1957 television episode
- "Stranglehold" (Ghost Whisperer), a 2008 television episode

== Other uses ==
- Stranglehold (video game), the video game sequel to the movie Hard Boiled
