= Little Woman Love =

- US revised picture sleeve

Single by Wings
- A-side: "Mary Had a Little Lamb"
- Released: 12 May 1972
- Recorded: 13 November 1970 – 21 January 1971
- Studio: CBS (New York); A&R (New York)
- Genre: Rockabilly
- Length: 2:11
- Label: Apple
- Songwriters: Paul McCartney; Linda McCartney
- Producer: Paul McCartney

Wings singles chronology
| "Give Ireland Back to the Irish" (1972) | "Little Woman Love" (1972) | "Hi, Hi, Hi" (1972) |

"Little Woman Love" is a Wings song released as the B-side of the non album single "Mary Had a Little Lamb" on 12 May 1972 by Apple Records.

== History ==
The song that would eventually become "Little Woman Love" first emerged during an instrumental improvisation recorded by McCartney, George Harrison and Ringo Starr on 3 January 1970 during the sessions for the Beatles' "I Me Mine", which was the group's final recording session. McCartney would eventually compose the rest of the song, and recorded it during the sessions for McCartney's solo album Ram. In keeping with McCartney's practice at the time, the composition was credited to Paul and Linda McCartney.

Beatle biographer John Blaney describes "Little Woman Love" as a "breezy rocker" with a rockabilly feel. The song is unusual for Wings in that instead of Paul McCartney playing electric bass guitar, jazz musician Milt Hinton plays slap bass.

Cash Box described it as a "'Lady Madonna'-ish rocker."

== Reception and charts ==
While "Mary Had a Little Lamb" was dismissed by the critics, it climbed to the top 10 in the United Kingdom. In the United States, however, radio stations also played "Little Woman Love." As a result, the picture sleeve for "Mary Had a Little Lamb" was revised by Apple Records to have a separate listing for the flip side. The single reached number 28 on the Billboard Hot 100 in the US. On the Cash Box chart, which listed single sides separately, "Little Woman Love" only appeared for one week at number 95.

== Release ==
"Little Woman Love" was never released on an album until 1993, when it was included as a bonus track to Wild Life in The Paul McCartney Collection. It was included on the Special and Deluxe editions of Ram and Red Rose Speedway. It was later included on The 7" Singles Box in 2022.

== Personnel ==
According to the author Luca Perasi:

- Paul McCartney – lead and backing vocals, piano, acoustic and electric guitar
- Linda McCartney – backing vocal
- Hugh McCracken – electric guitar
- Denny Seiwell – drums
- Denny Laine – backing vocals
- Milt Hinton – double bass

Technical

- Paul McCartney – producer
- Tim Geelan – engineer
