= Press to Play =

Studio album by Paul McCartney
- Released: 25 August 1986
- Recorded: March–May 1985; October–December 1985
- Studios: Hogg Hill Mill (Icklesham, England)
- Genre: Rock
- Length: 45:11 (LP); 58:53 (CD)
- Labels: Parlophone (UK); Capitol (US)
- Producers: Paul McCartney; Hugh Padgham

Paul McCartney chronology
Give My Regards to Broad Street (1984)	Press to Play (1986)	All the Best! (1987)

Paul McCartney studio album chronology
Give My Regards to Broad Street (1984)	Press to Play (1986)	Сно́ва в СССР (1988)

Singles from Press to Play
- 1. "Press" Released: 14 July 1986; 2. "Pretty Little Head" Released: 27 October 1986 (UK); 3. "Stranglehold" Released: 29 October 1986 (US); 4. "Only Love Remains" Released: 1 December 1986

Press to Play is the seventh solo studio album by the English musician Paul McCartney, released on 25 August 1986. It was McCartney's first album of original songs since Pipes of Peace in 1983, and his first solo album to be issued internationally by EMI following a six-year period with Columbia Records in the United States and Canada. Keen to re-establish himself after his poorly received 1984 musical film Give My Regards to Broad Street, McCartney enlisted producer Hugh Padgham to give the album a contemporary sound.

On release, Press to Play received a mixed critical reception and was McCartney's poorest-selling studio album up to that point. Although it failed to make the top 20 in the US, the album peaked at number 8 on the UK Albums Chart and achieved gold status from the BPI in September 1986. Four singles were issued from Press to Play: "Press", "Pretty Little Head", "Stranglehold" and "Only Love Remains". "Press" was a minor success, peaking at number 21 in the US. The music video for the song featured McCartney walking around Bond Street and Charing Cross tube stations in London, catching a tube train and speaking with members of the general public.

== Production and recording ==
After the box office failure of the musical film Give My Regards to Broad Street (1984), McCartney decided that it was time for a change of pace in his solo career. In an attempt to give his music a more contemporary sound, he joined forces with Hugh Padgham, an in-demand, multiple award-winning producer famous for having recorded Peter Gabriel, Phil Collins, Genesis, the Human League, the Police, and XTC.

McCartney began recording Press to Play in March 1985 at Hog Hill Mill, his home studio in East Sussex, having written several new songs, many with frequent collaborator and 10cc guitarist Eric Stewart, who co-wrote eight of the album's 13 songs. Though Stewart had appeared as a musician and vocalist on McCartney's previous three albums, the two had never written together before. One additional song co-written by McCartney and Stewart was released as a B-side ("Hanglide"), while two more songs were later recorded by 10cc for their studio albums ...Meanwhile (1992) and Mirror Mirror (1995). Although Hog Hill Mill Studio had already been used for a few tracks in 1984, Press to Play was the first album to be recorded there in its entirety. McCartney had his own studio built to save time and money, as he had previously spent a lot of time driving from Sussex to London for recording sessions, and studios such as Abbey Road and AIR were expensive.

This first batch of sessions lasted a few weeks, with drummer Martin Chambers also taking part. Hugh Padgham came on board in April 1985. Hog Hill Mill Studio had just been finished and Padgham could work with a fairly state-of-the-art analogue set up, with SSL-56 channel fully automated desk and two Studer A-800 with Q-Lock synchronisations. This time, the trio of musicians consisted of McCartney, Eric Stewart, and the drummer Jerry Marotta, who was suggested by Padgham. In January 1985, the producer called him, hinting at a big project but not disclosing McCartney's name.

Despite being underwhelmed by the quality of the demos he heard on a cassette sent to him some months before, Padgham had accepted McCartney's invitation. He said to author Luca Perasi: "I remember that evening very well. I took the cassette home and put it on that night. It was just Paul and Eric Stewart on acoustic guitars. And ... I didn't get it!"

This other batch of recordings lasted until June 1985. Over six weeks in the studio, McCartney, Stewart and Marotta recorded the basic tracks for at least 11 songs: "Stranglehold", "Good Times Coming"/ "Feel the Sun", "Footprints", "Press", "Pretty Little Head", "Move Over Busker", "However Absurd" (these eight were used on the Press to Play LP), "It's Not True" (B-side to the single "Press"), "Write Away" (B-side to the single "Pretty Little Head") and "Tough on a Tightrope" (B-side to the single "Only Love Remains"): these last three would also be included on the CD version of Press to Play. To get a band feel to the album, the tracks were laid down with McCartney and Stewart on acoustic or electric guitar or piano and Marotta on drums. Drummer Jerry Marotta recalled that each song took days to record, as McCartney enjoyed playing with a band again for the first time since Wings had disbanded. The sessions encouraged experimentation, with all participants urged to explore and try out new ideas and techniques. For "Good Times Coming", McCartney recorded his bass part outdoors, "sitting on a stool with the cables plugged into his bass", as Pagham has recalled in the book Paul McCartney: Press to Play. That Unmistakable 80s Sound. "Pretty Little Head" came out of a jam, with Eric Stewart on keyboards, Marotta on vibraphone and McCartney on Dynacord drums. "Talk More Talk", with random spoken words, sequencers and synthesizers, was recorded by McCartney on his own in one day, and was based on his song "It's Not On", recorded for Pipes of Peace but left unreleased at the time.

McCartney was insecure about his role as a bass player during the recordings, so he asked Padgham about hiring a session musician. Padgham was surprised to hear that, considering McCartney to be one of the best bass players of all time. In the end, McCartney played bass on all the tracks, although according to the producer, "sometimes it took hours and hours and hours!"

After completing the basic tracks and the first round of overdubs, the Press to Play sessions resumed in July 1985. Guesting on the album were the Who's lead guitarist, Pete Townshend, Genesis' drummer and lead vocalist Phil Collins, Split Enz's keyboardist Eddie Rayner and backing vocalists Ruby James and Kate Robbins. Carlos Alomar also overdubbed electric guitar on several tracks, including "Press", "Good Times Coming/Feel the Sun", "It's Not True", "Tough on a Tightrope", "Write Away" and "Move Over Busker", according to his recollections included in the book Paul McCartney: Recording Sessions (1969–2013). One of the tracks that had been recorded during the March sessions with Martin Chambers, "Angry", was completely redone on 20 July with Pete Townshend and Phil Collins, although the backing vocals from the original recording were kept.

Work on the album continued from October until the end of 1985, by which time only one song would see release from its sessions – the title track to the film Spies Like Us (1985), joined by Phil Ramone in the producer's chair. "Spies Like Us", a non-album single with Wings' 1975 recording "My Carnival" as the B-side, was a US top 10 hit.

The final session was for "Only Love Remains", recorded in the spring of 1986 when the album was being mixed. McCartney was accompanied by Graham Ward on drums and Simon Chamberlain on synth bass when recording the basic track.

== Cover artwork ==
The album's cover features Paul McCartney and his then-wife, Linda McCartney. The photograph was taken by George Hurrell, using the same box camera that he used in Hollywood in the 1930s and the 1940s. Hurrell was renowned for his photographs of movie stars of the 1930s and 1940s like Clark Gable and Greta Garbo, to which the album's cover was meant to pay homage.

== Release ==
"Press", a slick up-tempo pop song, was released in July 1986 and became the album's sole top 30 hit. Press to Play itself appeared on 25 August in the United States and 1 September in the United Kingdom. It received lukewarm reviews and proved to be McCartney's weakest-selling studio album up to that point.

McCartney seemed worried and recalled at a press meeting in August 1986: "When we started working on the record, Hugh [Padgham] came in one day and said he'd had a dream. He dreamed he woke up one morning and had made this really bad, syrupy album with me, an album he hated, and that it had blown his whole career. We took that as a little warning".

Peaking at number 8 in the UK, its chart life was brief, while in the US, Press to Play failed to go gold, peaking at number 30 and selling only 250,000 copies. The follow-up singles, "Pretty Little Head" and "Only Love Remains", performed poorly on the charts. As a result of this disappointing commercial reception, author Howard Sounes writes, McCartney appointed a former Polydor Records executive, Richard Ogden, as his manager, "to help revive his career".

In 1993, Press to Play was remastered and reissued on the CD as part of The Paul McCartney Collection series with his 1985 hit "Spies Like Us" and an alternate mix of impending 1987 UK success "Once Upon a Long Ago" as bonus tracks. In this edition, "Press" (4:25) was replaced by the 4:43 remixed version.

== Critical reception ==
Professional ratings
Review scores
Source	Rating
AllMusic	3/5 stars
Encyclopedia of Popular Music	2/5 stars
The Essential Rock Discography	4/10
Los Angeles Times	(unfavourable)
Q	2/5 stars
Record Mirror	2/5
Rolling Stone	(favourable)
The Rolling Stone Album Guide	2/5 stars
Smash Hits	5/10
Stylus Magazine	(mixed)

AllMusic editor Stephen Thomas Erlewine admired the track "Press", but gave the album a 3 out of 5 star rating saying: "McCartney is dabbling in each of his strengths, just to see what works. It doesn't wind up as one of his stronger albums, but it's more interesting than some of his more consistent ones, and those aforementioned cuts demonstrate that he could still cut effective pop records when he put his mind to it."

In a review for the Chicago Tribune, critic Lynn Van Matre wrote of the album: "No doubt about it, this is McCartney's most rocking album in ages. Much of it's catchy, most of it's fun, and it's superior to McCartney's efforts of recent years." In the Los Angeles Times, Terry Atkinson praised "Press" as "a sprightly, sunny delight – one of the most playful, positive pop songs ever written about the joy of sex and its link with love", but opined that overall "the album finds McCartney as lost as usual and Stewart of little help". Atkinson concluded: "Press to Play, though it shows some signs of recovery, is basically just another in a long line (over 12 years!) of post-Band on the Run letdowns by a once almost unimaginably creative artist." Rich Stim in Spin noted that 'the whole album, as well crafted as it is, offers too much conventional McCartney and not enough exceptional'.

More recently, Kit O'Toole of Blogcritics has contended that much of the album belongs among McCartney's "most ambitious work" and that the adventurousness of the project is unfairly overlooked. O'Toole adds: "Press to Play, along with McCartney II, arguably laid the foundation for his future musical experiments under the name The Fireman (particularly the first two albums, Strawberries Oceans Ships Forest and Rushes)."

In his book dedicated to the album, Paul McCartney: Press to Play. That Unmistakable 80s Sound (2025), author and McCartney historian Luca Perasi writes that "the album has its merits and is a prime example of Paul's architectural talent and Padgham’s production style."

== Track listing ==
All tracks are written by Paul McCartney and Eric Stewart, except where noted.

Side one
No.	Title	Writer(s)	Length
1.	"Stranglehold"		3:36
2.	"Good Times Coming/Feel the Sun"	McCartney	4:44
3.	"Talk More Talk"	McCartney	5:18
4.	"Footprints"		4:32
5.	"Only Love Remains"	McCartney	4:13
Total length:			22:23

Side two
No.	Title	Writer(s)	Length
6.	"Press"	McCartney	4:43
7.	"Pretty Little Head"		5:14
8.	"Move Over Busker"		4:05
9.	"Angry"		3:36
10.	"However Absurd"		4:56
Total length:			22:34

Additional CD tracks
No.	Title	Writer(s)	Length
11.	"Write Away"		3:00
12.	"It's Not True"	McCartney	5:53
13.	"Tough on a Tightrope"		4:42
Total length:			13:35

1993 CD The Paul McCartney Collection bonus tracks
No.	Title	Writer(s)	Length
14.	"Spies Like Us"	McCartney	4:45
15.	"Once Upon a Long Ago" (long version)	McCartney	4:37
Total length:			9:22

iTunes bonus track
No.	Title	Writer(s)	Length
16.	"Press" (12" Bevans/Forward dub mix)	McCartney	6:31

== Personnel ==
Musicians

- Paul McCartney – lead vocals, backing vocals, acoustic piano, keyboards, synthesizers, acoustic and electric guitars, bass guitar
- Nick Glennie-Smith – keyboards
- Eddie Rayner – keyboards
- Eric Stewart – keyboards, acoustic guitar, electric guitars, harmony vocals
- Simon Chamberlain – acoustic piano, electric grand piano
- Carlos Alomar – acoustic guitar, electric guitars
- Pete Townshend – electric guitars (9)
- Jerry Marotta – drums, percussion
- Graham Ward – drums, percussion
- Phil Collins – drums and percussion (9)
- Ray Cooper – percussion
- Dick Morrissey – tenor saxophone
- Lenny Pickett – alto saxophone, tenor saxophone
- Gary Barnacle – saxophone
- John Bradbury – violin
- Gavyn Wright – violin
- Nigel Kennedy – violin solo (15)
- Tony Visconti – orchestral arrangements (5)
- Anne Dudley – orchestral arrangements (10)
- Kate Robbins – harmony vocals
- Ruby James – harmony vocals
- Linda McCartney – harmony vocals, spoken word (3)
- James McCartney – spoken word (3)
- John Hammel – spoken word (3)
- Matt Howe – spoken word (3)
- Steve Jackson – spoken word (3)
- Eddie Klein – spoken word (3)

Production and artwork

- Paul McCartney – producer, stereo drawings
- Hugh Padgham – producer (1–13, 15), engineer (1, 2, 4–15), mixing (1–5, 7–11, 13, 14)
- Phil Ramone – producer (14, 15)
- George Hurrell – photography
- Haydn Bendall – additional engineer
- Matt Butler – additional engineer
- Tony Clark – additional engineer
- Matt Howe – additional engineer
- Steve Jackson – additional engineer, engineer (3)
- Jon Kelly – additional engineer
- Peter Mew – additional engineer
- Bert Bevans – mixing (6)
- Steve Forward – mixing (6)
- Julian Mendelsohn – mixing (12)
- George Martin – mixing (15)
- John Hammel – studio technician
- Trevor Jones – studio technician
- Eddie Klein – studio technician

== Charts, sales and certifications ==
=== Weekly charts ===
Weekly chart performance for Press to Play
Chart (1986)	Peak position
Australian Kent Music Report	22
Canadian RPM Albums Chart	28
Dutch Mega Albums Chart	21
Japanese Oricon LPs Chart ^{[A]}	11
Norwegian VG-lista Albums Chart	8
Spanish Albums Chart	12
Swedish Albums Chart	17
Swiss Albums Chart	28
UK Albums Chart	8
US Billboard 200	30
West German Media Control Albums Chart	30

=== Certifications and sales ===
Certifications for Press to Play
Region	Certification	Certified units/sales
Japan (Oricon Charts)	—	81,000
United Kingdom (BPI)	Gold	100,000^{^}
^{^} Shipments figures based on certification alone.

Notes

- A Until January 1987, Japanese albums chart had been separated into LP, CD, and cassette charts. Press to Play also entered the cassette chart at number 21, and peaked at number 8 on the CD chart.
