= (I Want to) Come Home =

2010 single by Paul McCartney

Single by Paul McCartney
- Released: 1 March 2010
- Recorded: June – July 2009
- Studio: Hogg Hill Mill (Icklesham, UK); AIR Studios (London, UK)
- Genre: Rock
- Length: 3:34
- Label: MPL Communications
- Songwriter: Paul McCartney
- Producer: Paul McCartney

Paul McCartney singles chronology
"Meat Free Monday" (2009)	"(I Want to) Come Home" (2010)	"My Valentine" (2011)

"(I Want to) Come Home" is a song written and recorded by Paul McCartney for the 2009 film Everybody's Fine.

== Composition and recording ==
An early cut of Everybody's Fine was screened for McCartney, with Aretha Franklin's cover of "Let It Be" inserted as a placeholder by director Kirk Jones. McCartney was inspired to write the song for the film after connecting with the protagonist, portrayed by Robert De Niro, a widower who "hits the road to visit his scattered children after they cancel a weekend gathering." McCartney told USA Today, "I can very much relate to a guy who's got older children, who happens to have lost his wife, the mother of those children, and is trying to get them all together at Christmas. I understand that." After recording a demo version on cassette, McCartney received notes for the song from Jones requesting an intro for the song as opposed to its original "abrupt" start. McCartney then collaborated with the film's music composer Dario Marianelli on orchestrations for the song "resulting in an intimate ballad with piano, guitar and spare strings." "(I Want to) Come Home" was recorded with engineer Geoff Emerick along with 20 other tracks around this time.

== Personnel ==
- Paul McCartney – vocals, bass, acoustic and electric guitars, piano, drums, tambourine
- Unknown – strings, horns
- Dario Marianelli – string arrangement

== Release ==
The song was released as a single in online music stores on 1 March 2010. The song is not included on the soundtrack to the film. Its original and demo versions were released on The 7" Singles Box on 2 December 2022. The song was nominated for a Golden Globe Award for Best Original Song, but did not win, losing the award to "The Weary Kind", from Crazy Heart, by Ryan Bingham.

== Cover version ==
In 2012, Tom Jones released a recording of the song on his studio album, Spirit in the Room.

== Charts ==
Chart (2009)	Peak position
Russia (Tophit)	1
