= I Want to Walk You Home =

Single by Fats Domino
- B-side: "I'm Gonna Be a Wheel Someday"
- Released: July 1959
- Genre: New Orleans R&B
- Length: 2:02
- Label: Imperial
- Songwriter(s): Fats Domino

Fats Domino singles chronology
"I'm Ready" (1959)	"I Want to Walk You Home" (1959)	"Be My Guest" (1959)

"I Want to Walk You Home" is a July 1959 pop-style R&B song written and recorded by Fats Domino. Released by Imperial Records as a single, it was the last of Domino's releases to reach number one on the R&B chart. "I Want to Walk You Home" stayed at the top spot for a single week and also peaked at number eight on the Billboard Hot 100.
