= All the Best! =

- UK & Canadian vinyl cover

Greatest hits album by Paul McCartney
- Released: 2 November 1987
- Recorded: 1970–1987
- Genre: Rock
- Length: 86:29 (International version); 72:14 (US version); 72:35 (CD version)
- Labels: EMI/Parlophone (UK); Capitol (US)
- Producers: Paul McCartney; Linda McCartney; George Martin; Phil Ramone

Paul McCartney chronology
Press to Play (1986)	All the Best! (1987)	Сно́ва в СССР (1988)

Singles from All the Best!
- 1. "Once Upon a Long Ago" Released: 16 November 1987

Professional ratings
Review scores
Source	Rating
AllMusic	4.5/5 stars
Christgau's Record Guide	C+
The Encyclopedia of Popular Music	4/5 stars
The Essential Rock Discography	8/10
MusicHound Rock	3/5
New Musical Express	9/10
Q	3/5 stars
The Rolling Stone Album Guide	3.5/5 stars

All the Best! is the second compilation album by Paul McCartney, released in 1987 on Capitol Records and Parlophone Records. It features an equal selection of Wings and solo material.

== Overview ==
The album contains tracks from the beginning of his solo career in 1970 up to (on editions outside the United States) the newly recorded "Once Upon a Long Ago". The American version has a different track listing, reflecting the popularity of particular songs there. Originally the album was to include the unreleased London Town track "Waterspout"; there are LP slicks that feature it as the opening track on side two, as well as a cartoon icon, but the song was omitted at the last minute.

Editions outside the United States have 20 tracks on the vinyl version and 17 on CD; the CD omits "Maybe I'm Amazed", "Goodnight Tonight", and "With A Little Luck". The American edition has 17 tracks on both vinyl and CD, and omits "Pipes of Peace", "Maybe I'm Amazed", "Once Upon A Long Ago", "We All Stand Together", and "Mull of Kintyre", but adds "Junior's Farm" and "Uncle Albert/Admiral Halsey". It also substitutes the studio version of "Coming Up" with an edit of the live version, and has a shorter version of "With A Little Luck".

Originally, McCartney wanted to release an outtakes album called Cold Cuts, on which he had been working for over ten years; but his manager recommended that releasing a best-of compilation would have been a better idea. When All the Best! was released, the Cold Cuts album was permanently abandoned.

== Reception ==
All the Best! was a commercial success in the UK, where it reached number 2 (having been kept off the top position by George Michael's debut solo album, Faith). In America, the compilation peaked at number 62, although it was eventually certified double platinum there.

== Track listings ==
=== UK/Australian/Canadian/Japanese listing ===
Side one
No.	Title	Writer(s)	Album	Length
1.	"Jet"	Paul McCartney, Linda McCartney	Band on the Run, 1973	4:08
2.	"Band on the Run"	P. McCartney, L. McCartney	Band on the Run	5:11
3.	"Coming Up"	P. McCartney	McCartney II, 1980	3:51
4.	"Ebony and Ivory" (with Stevie Wonder)	P. McCartney	Tug of War, 1982	3:41
5.	"Listen to What the Man Said"	P. McCartney, L. McCartney	Venus and Mars, 1975	3:55

Side two
No.	Title	Writer(s)	Album	Length
1.	"No More Lonely Nights" (Radio edit)	P. McCartney	Give My Regards to Broad Street soundtrack, 1984	4:38
2.	"Silly Love Songs"	P. McCartney, L. McCartney	Wings at the Speed of Sound, 1976	5:54
3.	"Let 'Em In"	P. McCartney, L. McCartney	Wings at the Speed of Sound	5:09
4.	"C Moon"	P. McCartney, L. McCartney	non-album single, 1972	4:33
5.	"Pipes of Peace" (Radio edit)	P. McCartney	Pipes of Peace, 1983	3:24

Side three
No.	Title	Writer(s)	Album	Length
1.	"Live and Let Die"	P. McCartney, L. McCartney	Live and Let Die soundtrack, 1973	3:11
2.	"Another Day"	P. McCartney, L. McCartney	non-album single, 1971	3:41
3.	"Maybe I'm Amazed"	P. McCartney	McCartney, 1970	3:50
4.	"Goodnight Tonight"	P. McCartney	non-album single, 1979	4:19
5.	"Once Upon a Long Ago"	P. McCartney	All the Best! compilation, 1987	4:09

Side four
No.	Title	Writer(s)	Album	Length
1.	"Say Say Say" (with Michael Jackson)	P. McCartney, Michael Jackson	Pipes of Peace	3:55
2.	"With a Little Luck"	P. McCartney	London Town, 1978	5:45
3.	"My Love"	P. McCartney, L. McCartney	Red Rose Speedway, 1973	4:08
4.	"We All Stand Together"	P. McCartney	Rupert and the Frog Song soundtrack, 1984	4:23
5.	"Mull of Kintyre"	P. McCartney, Denny Laine	non-album single, 1977	4:44

- - "Maybe I'm Amazed", "Goodnight Tonight", and "With A Little Luck" are not included on CD release
- - "Once Upon a Long Ago" is a new song released as single from this album

=== US track listing ===
Side one
No.	Title	Writer(s)	Album	Length
1.	"Band on the Run"	P. McCartney, L. McCartney	Band on the Run	5:11
2.	"Jet"	P. McCartney, L. McCartney	Band on the Run	4:08
3.	"Ebony and Ivory" (with Stevie Wonder)	P. McCartney	Tug of War	3:43
4.	"Listen to What the Man Said"	P. McCartney, L. McCartney	Venus and Mars	3:55

Side two
No.	Title	Writer(s)	Album	Length
1.	"No More Lonely Nights" (Radio edit)	P. McCartney	Give My Regards to Broad Street soundtrack	4:38
2.	"Silly Love Songs"	P. McCartney, L. McCartney	Wings at the Speed of Sound	5:54
3.	"Let 'Em In"	P. McCartney, L. McCartney	Wings at the Speed of Sound	5:09
4.	"Say Say Say" (with Michael Jackson)	P. McCartney, M. Jackson	Pipes of Peace	3:56

Side three
No.	Title	Writer(s)	Album	Length
1.	"Live and Let Die"	P. McCartney, L. McCartney	Live and Let Die soundtrack	3:11
2.	"Another Day"	P. McCartney, L. McCartney	non-album single, 1971	3:41
3.	"C Moon"	P. McCartney, L. McCartney	non-album single, 1972	4:33
4.	"Junior's Farm"	P. McCartney, L. McCartney	non-album single, 1974	4:23
5.	"Uncle Albert/Admiral Halsey" (Radio edit)	P. McCartney, L. McCartney	Ram, 1971	4:41

Side four
No.	Title	Writer(s)	Album	Length
1.	"Coming Up" (Live at Glasgow (Edit))	P. McCartney	non-album single, 1980	3:31
2.	"Goodnight Tonight"	P. McCartney	non-album single, 1979	4:19
3.	"With a Little Luck" (Radio edit)	P. McCartney	London Town	3:13
4.	"My Love"	P. McCartney, L. McCartney	Red Rose Speedway	4:08

== Charts ==
=== Chart positions ===
Year	Chart	Peak position
1987	UK Albums (OCC)	2
1988	Austrian Albums (Ö3 Austria)	23
1988	Canadian Albums (RPM)	30
1988	Dutch Albums (Album Top 100)	10
1988	German Albums (Offizielle Top 100)	9
1988	New Zealand Albums (RMNZ)	5
1988	Swiss Albums (Schweizer Hitparade)	11
1988	US Billboard 200	62
1993	Australian Albums (ARIA)	10
1995	French Compilations (SNEP)	4
1995	Swedish Albums (Sverigetopplistan)	7
2000	US Top Catalog Albums (Billboard)	36
2005	Spanish Albums (Promusicae)	99
2008	Norwegian Albums (VG-lista)	39

== Certifications ==
Region	Certification	Certified units/sales
Argentina (CAPIF)	Gold	30,000^{^}
Australia (ARIA)	2× Platinum	140,000^{^}
Austria (IFPI Austria)	Gold	25,000^{*}
Canada (Music Canada)	Gold	50,000^{^}
France (SNEP)	Gold	100,000^{*}
New Zealand (RMNZ)	Platinum	15,000^{^}
Spain (Promusicae)	Gold	50,000^{^}
United Kingdom (BPI)	3× Platinum	900,000^{^}
United States (RIAA)	2× Platinum	2,000,000^{^}
^{*} Sales figures based on certification alone.^{^} Shipments figures based on certification alone.
