= Wanderlust (Paul McCartney song) =

Song by Paul McCartney

from the album Tug of War
- Released: 26 April 1982
- Recorded: 1981
- Genre: Ballad; pop
- Length: 3:49
- Label: Parlophone (UK); Columbia Records (US)
- Songwriter: Paul McCartney
- Producer: George Martin

"Wanderlust" is a song by the English rock bassist and former Beatle Paul McCartney. It is a ballad that appears as the eighth track on his fifth solo studio album Tug of War (1982). A re-recorded version of the song appears on his 1984 soundtrack/studio album Give My Regards to Broad Street.

== Background ==
The song was written during Wings' trip to the Virgin Islands, in which the US Customs officials searched the yacht and found a bunch of marijuana, and the captain was upset about what was happening on the yacht. According to Paul McCartney: "[He] was a little sort of heavier than the other captains," and "he sort of took it a little more seriously. And at some stage we had an argument with him, and I said, 'You know, we don't need all this aggro stuff,' and we wanted to get off onto this other boat that happened to be in the harbour. These people had said we could come on this boat, and this boat happened to be called Wanderlust, so it became a symbol of freedom to me, this catamaran called Wanderlust.”

== Recording ==
Paul McCartney had originally intended of former Beatle guitarist George Harrison to play guitar on the track but, according to McCartney, Harrison had said: "First I've got this track that I'd like you to sing harmonies on." McCartney had later said that "he never got to do the guitar overdub in 'Wanderlust'."

== Critical reception ==
The Boston Globe writer M. Howell states that it "reprises Paul's choir-boy voice against a solo piano, just like 'Let It Be' or 'The Long and Winding Road.'" In a review for Rolling Stone, music critic Stephen Holden states that it "compares sexual independence to foolish military adventuring. It's in these seemingly lighter moments that George Martin's studio touches illuminate McCartney's wistful hominess with exquisite musical details". In an AllMusic review, Matthew Greenwald wrote that "There is a melancholy to the music and arrangement, which is full without being cluttered", noting there being a similarity to some of the tracks on Red Rose Speedway. Ultimate Classic Rock critic Nick DeRiso ranked it as McCartney's 3rd best "deep cut".

== Official album releases ==
	Album	Release year	Take/ version	Personnel	Ref.
1	Tug of War	1982		Paul McCartney: bass, guitar, piano, vocals; Adrian Sheppard: drums, percussion; Denny Laine: bass, guitar, guitar synthesizer; Linda McCartney: backing vocals; Eric Stewart: backing vocals; The Philip Jones Brass: horns	
2	Give My Regards to Broad Street	1984	Re-recording	Paul McCartney: piano, vocals; Ringo Starr: drums; The Philip Jones Brass: horns	
3	Tug of War (deluxe edition)	2015	Demo	Paul McCartney: bass, drums, electric piano, acoustic guitar, vocals	
4	Pure McCartney	2016	Tug of War version		

== Personnel ==
=== Tug of War version ===
According to author John Blaney, except where noted:

- Paul McCartney – bass, guitar, piano, vocals
- Adrian Sheppard – drums, percussion
- Denny Laine – bass, guitar, guitar synthesizer
- Linda McCartney – backing vocals
- Eric Stewart – backing vocals
- The Philip Jones Brass – horns

=== Give My Regards to Broad Street version ===
According to author John Blaney:

- Paul McCartney – piano, vocals
- Ringo Starr – drums
- The Philip Jones Brass – horns

== Cover versions ==
- The Beach Boys frontman Brian Wilson contributed a cover of the song to the Paul McCartney tribute album The Art of McCartney in 2014.

== Sources ==
- Blaney, John (2007). Lennon and McCartney: Together Alone (1st ed.). Jawbone Press. ISBN 978-1-906002-02-2.
- Jackson, Andrew Grant (2012). Still the Greatest: The Essential Solo Beatles Songs. Lanham, MD: Scarecrow Press. ISBN 978-0-8108-8222-5.
