= Talk More Talk =

Song by Paul McCartney

from the album Press to Play
- Released: 25 August 1986
- Recorded: April 1985–April 1986
- Length: 5:18
- Label: Parlophone (UK); Capitol (US)
- Songwriter: McCartney
- Producer: McCartney

"Talk More Talk" is a song by the English musician Paul McCartney, released as the third track on his eighth solo studio album Press to Play (1986).

== Background and recording ==
McCartney recorded the basic track of "Talk More Talk" from scratch in the studio sometime before the Press to Play sessions, which is why it is not included on the assembly mixes of the album, and was "finished in a day". The spoken word tracks are reminiscent of the Pink Floyd album The Dark Side of the Moon and are of McCartney's wife Linda McCartney, Paul's son James McCartney, the album's engineer Eddie Klein, and the assistants John Hammel, Matt Howe, and Steve Jackson. The 12 inch single mix was created by Jon Jacobs and Paul.

== Music and lyrics ==
The music, which Paul himself has described as "surrealist", has been described as being an "empty attempt at social observation" by Terry Atkinson of the Los Angeles Times. McCartney took the lyrics from an interview he did with Tom Waits. Other musicians on the track include Eric Stewart on guitar and backing vocals, and Jerry Marotta on drums and percussion.

== Release and reception ==
"Talk More Talk" was issued on Press to Play on 25 August 1986 and sequenced as the third track. The song was going to be the second UK exclusive single with a scheduled release date of 6 October, backed with "Write Away", but the single was never released, although it already had an around 3 minute edit already made. Club Sandwich magazine writes that "This piece of controlled eccentricity stands out for its syncopation even on Press." One rough and one alternative mix can be found on the Extended Tracks bootleg in 1994. Paul McCartney biographer Ted Montgomery writes that "Weird spoken parts usher in this miasma of percussion heave gobbledygook", noting that "The song pauses toward the end with varied speeds of spoken word phrases that, of course, make no sense at all".

== Personnel ==
According to authors John Blaney for instrumentation and main vocals, and Chip Madinger and Mark Easter for the spoken word tracks:

- Paul McCartney – bass, keyboards, vocals
- Eric Stewart – guitar, backing vocals
- Jerry Marotta – drums, percussion
- James McCartney – spoken word
- Linda McCartney – spoken word
- Eddie Klein – spoken word
- John Hammel – spoken word
- Matt Howe – spoken word
- Steve Jackson – spoken word
