= Spies Like Us (song) =

Single by Paul McCartney
- B-side: "My Carnival" (7"); "Spies Like Us" (Party Mix) (12"); "Spies Like Us" (Alternate Mix – Known to His Friends as "Tom") (12"); "Spies Like Us" (DJ Version) (12"); "My Carnival" (Party Mix) (12")
- Released: 18 November 1985
- Recorded: September 1985
- Studio: Hogg Hill Mill (Icklesham, UK)
- Genre: New wave
- Length: 4:48
- Label: Parlophone (UK); Capitol (US)
- Songwriter: Paul McCartney
- Producers: Paul McCartney; Hugh Padgham; Phil Ramone

Paul McCartney singles chronology
"We All Stand Together" (1984)	"Spies Like Us" (1985)	"Press" (1986)

Music video
- "Spies Like Us" on YouTube

"Spies Like Us" is the title song to the 1985 Warner Bros. motion picture of the same name, starring Chevy Chase, Dan Aykroyd, and Donna Dixon. It was written and performed by the English rock musician Paul McCartney, and reached number 7 on the US Billboard Hot 100 in early 1986, making it McCartney's last US top ten hit until 2015's "FourFiveSeconds". It also reached #13 in the UK.

== Recording and release ==
Multiple releases were issued in the UK: a regular 7" single, a 7" shaped picture disc, a regular 12" single featuring extended mixes and the B-side "My Carnival" (a Paul McCartney and Wings track from the Venus and Mars sessions) and a 12" picture disc.

The minute-long outro is uptempo while the title is being sung repeatedly. When the movie Spies Like Us hit the theaters, producers opted to play the outro first in the closing credits before playing the entire song.

"Spies Like Us" was first released on CD in 1993, as part of the release of The Paul McCartney Collection, as a bonus track on the studio album Press to Play (1986). The B-side, "My Carnival", was released as a bonus track on Venus and Mars, and the 12" single was an exclusive to iTunes. The "Alternative Mix" was included on the deluxe edition of Art of Noise's third studio album, In No Sense? Nonsense! (1987), released in 2018. It was also included on The 7″ Singles Box in 2022.

== Critical reception ==
Cashbox said that it is "playful and danceable" with "innate tunefulness," "an ambitious arrangement and a classic resonant and melodic verse line are highlights."

Director of the film John Landis has stated that he thought it was "a terrible song", but couldn't say no to McCartney and Warner Bros.

== Music video ==
The music video for the song, directed by John Landis (who also directed the film), was not aired by the BBC because Dan Aykroyd and Chevy Chase appeared in it playing instruments. British labour rules at the time prohibited non-musicians from performing in videos, and Aykroyd and Chase did not actually play on the record though both have worked as professional musicians in other contexts. The video ends with McCartney, Chase, and Aykroyd walking across Abbey Road, parodying the Beatles' Abbey Road album cover. A second version of the video includes Donna Dixon and Vanessa Angel singing the outro alongside Paul McCartney and Dan Aykroyd.

The video was however played on the long running BBC show Top of the Pops (TOTP) on 2 January 1986 having already briefly featured in its Top 40 Breakers section during December 1985.

== Track listings ==
7" single (R 6118)

1. "Spies Like Us" – 4:40
2. "My Carnival" – 3:56
  - Performed by Paul McCartney and Wings

12" single (12R 6118)

1. "Spies Like Us" (Party Mix) – 7:10
  - Remix by John Potoker
2. "Spies Like Us" (Alternate Mix – Known to His Friends as "Tom") – 3:56
  - Remix by Art of Noise
3. "Spies Like Us" (DJ Version) – 3:46
4. "My Carnival" (Party Mix) – 6:00
  - Remix by Gary Langan

== Personnel ==
Spies Like Us

- Paul McCartney – vocals, bass guitar, electric guitar, drums, keyboards, percussion, tambourine
- Eddie Rayner – synthesizers
- Eric Stewart – backing vocals
- Kate Robbins – backing vocals
- Ruby James – backing vocals
- Linda McCartney – backing vocals

My Carnival

- Paul McCartney – vocals, piano
- Linda McCartney – organ, vocals
- Denny Laine – bass, vocals
- Jimmy McCulloch – guitars, vocals
- Joe English – drums, percussion
- Benny Spellman – vocals
- The Meters – vocals

== Charts ==
=== Weekly charts ===
Chart (1985–1986)	Peak position
Australia (Kent Music Report)	55
Belgium (Ultratop 50 Flanders)	26
Canada (The Record)	24
Canada Top Singles (RPM)	15
Irish Singles Chart	8
UK Singles (Official Charts)	13
US Billboard Hot 100	7
US Mainstream Rock (Billboard)	31

=== Year-end charts ===
Chart (1986)	Position
US Top Pop Singles (Billboard)	92
