= C Moon =

1972 single by Wings

- Label of the UK 7-inch single

Single by Wings
- A-side: "Hi, Hi, Hi"
- Released: 1 December 1972
- Recorded: 2 September 1972
- Studio: Morgan Studios, London
- Genre: Rocksteady; reggae rock
- Length: 4:33
- Label: Apple Records
- Songwriters: Paul McCartney; Linda McCartney
- Producer: Paul McCartney

Wings singles chronology
"Mary Had a Little Lamb" (1972)	"C Moon" / "Hi, Hi, Hi" (1972)	"My Love" (1973)

Alternative cover art
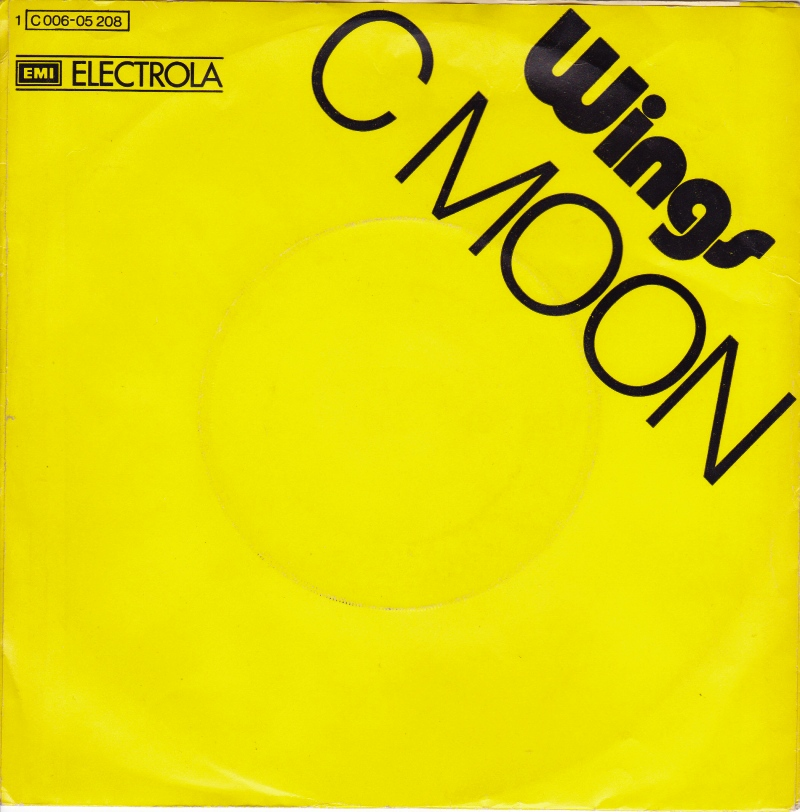
- Back cover of the German release of "Hi Hi Hi"

"C Moon" is a song written by Paul and Linda McCartney and performed by Wings. It was released as a double A-side with "Hi, Hi, Hi" in 1972. The single reached No. 5 on the UK Singles Chart and since "Hi, Hi, Hi" was banned by the BBC, "C Moon" received much airplay in the United Kingdom. In the United States, "C Moon" did not appear on any of the major record charts.

== Lyrics and structure ==
The title "C Moon" was inspired by lyrics in the song "Wooly Bully" by Sam the Sham and the Pharaohs. McCartney said, "There's a line in [Wooly Bully] that says, 'Let's not be L7.' Well, L7, it was explained at the time, means a square—put L and 7 together and you get a square... So I thought of the idea of putting a C and a moon together (a half-moon) to get the opposite of a square. So 'C Moon' means cool, in other words."

The recording includes a missed-cue intro that was kept in the released version.

The song is in the key of C and is in 4/4 time. The performers change instruments from their usual places. Guitarist Henry McCullough plays drums and tambourine, guitarist Denny Laine plays bass, and drummer Denny Seiwell plays xylophone and cornet.

The song was recorded around the same time as "Hi, Hi, Hi", in September 1972.

== Releases ==
Country	UK	US	Germany	France	Japan
Label	Apple	Apple	EMI Electrola/Apple	Apple	Apple
Catalogue number	R 5973	1857	1C006-05208	2C006-05208	EAR-10241
Release date	1 December 1972	4 December 1972	December, 1972		20 January 1973
Chart ratings	5 (16 January 1973)	—	N/A	N/A	26 (February, 1973)

The song was included on the Paul McCartney compilation albums All the Best! (1987), Wingspan: Hits and History (2001) and the deluxe edition of Wings (2025), and as a bonus track on the 1993 remastered CD of Red Rose Speedway, as part of The Paul McCartney Collection. It was also included on The 7" Singles Box in 2022.

== Personnel ==
According to the author Luca Perasi:

- Paul McCartney – lead and backing vocals, piano, cornet, handclaps
- Linda McCartney – backing vocals, tambourine
- Denny Laine – backing vocals, bass
- Henry McCullough – drums
- Denny Seiwell – xylophone, cornet
- Heather McCartney – backing vocals
- Mary McCartney – backing vocals

Technical

- Paul McCartney – producer
- John Leckie – engineer

== Sources ==
- McCartney, Paul (2007). The McCartney Years (DVD). Rhino Records.
- McGee, Garry (2003). Band on the Run: A History of Paul McCartney and Wings. New York: Taylor Trade Publishing. ISBN 978-0-87833-304-2.
