= Only Love Remains =

Single by Paul McCartney

from the album Press to Play
- B-side: Tough on a Tightrope (7"); Talk More Talk (Remix) (12")
- Released: 1 December 1986
- Recorded: October–December 1985
- Studio: Hog Hill Mill (Icklesham, UK)
- Length: 4:11
- Label: Parlophone
- Songwriter: Paul McCartney
- Producers: Paul McCartney; Hugh Padgham

Paul McCartney singles chronology
"Stranglehold" (1986)	"Only Love Remains" (1986)	"Once Upon a Long Ago" (1987)

"Only Love Remains" is a song by the English rock musician Paul McCartney, released on 1 December 1986 by Parlophone as the fourth single from his sixth solo studio album, Press to Play. A ballad, it reached number 34 on the UK singles chart.

== Release ==
The song was released as a 7" single and a 12" maxi single. The single version of "Only Love Remains" is a remix by Jim Boyer and is different from the album version. The 12" version of the single featured two more remixes of songs from Press to Play.

== Critical reception ==
Cash Box said that "McCartney’s impeccable touch with a ballad shines on this classic-sounding new single."

== Track listings ==
7" single (R 6148)

1. "Only Love Remains" – 4:11
  - Remix by Jim Boyer
2. "Tough on a Tightrope" – 4:44

12" single (12R 6148)

1. "Only Love Remains" – 4:11
  - Remix by Jim Boyer
2. "Tough on a Tightrope" – 7:03
  - Remix by Julian Mendelsohn
3. "Talk More Talk" – 5:56
  - Remix by Paul McCartney and Jon Jacobs

== Personnel ==
According to The Paul McCartney Project:

- Paul McCartney – lead and backing vocals, classical guitar, piano, synthesizers
- Linda McCartney – backing vocals
- Eric Stewart – possible acoustic guitar, backing vocals
- Ray Cooper – marimba, possible shaker, possible tambourine
- Simon Chamberlain – synth bass
- John Bradbury – violin
- Kate Robbins – backing vocals
- Ruby James – backing vocals
- Graham Ward – drums

== Charts ==
=== Weekly charts ===
Chart (1986–1987)	Peak position
Canada Top Singles (RPM)	95
Ireland (IRMA)	20
UK Singles (Official Charts)	34
US Adult Contemporary (Billboard)	9
