= Press (Paul McCartney song) =

- single cover

Single by Paul McCartney

from the album Press to Play
- B-side: "It's Not True" (7"); "Hanglide" (12"); "It's Not True" (Remix) (12"); "Press" (Dub Mix) (12")
- Released: 14 July 1986
- Recorded: April–May 1985
- Studio: Hog Hill Mill (Icklesham, UK)
- Genre: Synth-pop
- Length: 4:43 (Album version); 3:55 (Single version)
- Label: Parlophone; EMI
- Songwriter: Paul McCartney
- Producers: Paul McCartney; Hugh Padgham

Paul McCartney singles chronology
"Spies Like Us" (1985)	"Press" (1986)	"Pretty Little Head" (1986)

Official audio
- "Press" on YouTube

"Press" is a song by the English rock musician Paul McCartney. It was released as the lead single from his sixth solo studio album, Press to Play (1986), being McCartney's 37th single. The single has "It's Not True" as its B-side, which was only included on CD releases of Press to Play.

== Release ==
Released on 14 July 1986, "Press" peaked at number 25 on the UK Singles Chart, number 21 on the US Billboard Hot 100 and number 23 on the US Cash Box Top 100. This marked the beginning of a downturn in McCartney's fortunes on the singles charts, since it was the first time since Back to the Egg in 1979 that a lead single from a McCartney album had failed to reach the top 20 in the US or the UK.

Various issues in the UK include two 7-inch singles ("Press" and "Press-video edit"), a 10-inch single in a special fold-out sleeve, and two 12-inch singles.

== Promotional video ==
McCartney accepting a kiss from a female fan

The 1986 music video for "Press" was shot entirely in the London Underground. McCartney sings the song as he takes the Tube from South Kensington to Piccadilly Circus. As he takes the escalator to the platform and boards a Tube train, he begins singing the track. The video continues with scenes from around the Underground. These include shots of various commuters and buskers, featuring an accordionist and a violinist. McCartney interacts with members of the general public aboard the train and in the station, signing autographs, accepting a kiss from a female fan and leaving a tip for the violinist. In the final shot, he is seen riding the escalator up out of the Underground. The video edit was also included on The 7" Singles Box in 2022.

== Critical reception ==
AllMusic critic Stephen Thomas Erlewine describes "Press" as "a terrific mid-'80s drum machine-driven slice of synth-pop, utterly featherweight in the best possible way". In his contemporary review for the Los Angeles Times, Terry Atkinson stated that the track was "a sprightly, sunny delight – one of the most playful, positive pop songs ever written about the joy of sex and its link with love". Cash Box said that "The master of the pop song form is back with yet another instantly accessible cut," calling the song "a sure-fire, pleasing and lighthearted track that should collect big numbers at radio." Billboard reviewed the song calling it "do-it-yourself double entendre with whimsical bounce."

== Track listings ==
All songs written by Paul McCartney except where noted.

7-inch single (UK only)

1. "Press" – 4:20
  - Mixed by Hugh Padgham
  - Actual running length is 3:55; other than the earlier fade, this mix is identical to the 10-inch single
2. "It's Not True" – 4:31

7-inch single (R 6133)

1. "Press" (Video Edit) – 3:35
  - Mixed by Bert Bevans and Steve Forward
2. "It's Not True" – 4:31

12-inch single (12R 6133)

1. "Press" (Video Soundtrack) – 4:43
  - Mixed by Hugh Padgham
2. "It's Not True" (Remix) – 5:50
  - Remix by Julian Mendelsohn
3. "Hanglide" (McCartney, Eric Stewart) – 5:18
4. "Press" (Dub Mix) – 6:30
  - Remix by Bert Bevans and Steve Forward

10-inch single (10R 6133)

1. "Press" – 4:20
  - Mixed by Hugh Padgham
2. "It's Not True" (Remix) – 5:50
  - Remix by Julian Mendelsohn
3. "Press" (Video Edit) – 3:35
  - Mixed by Bert Bevans and Steve Forward

== Personnel ==
According to The Paul McCartney Project:

- Paul McCartney – lead and backing vocals, electric guitar, keyboards
- Linda McCartney – backing vocals
- Eric Stewart – backing vocals
- Carlos Alomar – electric guitar
- Eddie Rayner – possible keyboards, possible synthesizers
- Simon Chamberlain – possible synth bass
- John Bradbury – possible violin
- Gavin Wright – possible violin
- Jerry Marotta – drums

== Chart performance ==
Chart (1986)	Position
Belgium Ultratop	17
UK Singles Chart	25
Irish Singles Chart	15
US Billboard Hot 100	21
US Cash Box Top 100	23
Polish Music Charts	34
Canada Top Singles (RPM)	28
German Media Control Charts	53
Australian ARIA Charts	47
Federation of the Italian Music Industry	90
