= My Brave Face =

1989 single by Paul McCartney

- 7-inch sleeve

Single by Paul McCartney

from the album Flowers in the Dirt
- B-side: "Flying to My Home"; "I'm Gonna Be a Wheel Someday"; "Ain't That a Shame"
- Released: 8 May 1989
- Recorded: 1988
- Studio: Hog Hill Mill (Icklesham, UK); Olympic (London, UK)
- Genre: Rock
- Length: 3:19
- Label: Capitol; Parlophone
- Songwriters: Paul McCartney; Elvis Costello
- Producers: Paul McCartney; Mitchell Froom; Neil Dorfsman

Paul McCartney singles chronology
"Once Upon a Long Ago" (1987)	"My Brave Face" (1989)	"This One" (1989)

Music video
- ”My Brave Face” on YouTube

"My Brave Face" is a song by the English musician Paul McCartney, released as a single from his eighth solo studio album, Flowers in the Dirt (1989). Written by McCartney and Elvis Costello, "My Brave Face" is one of the most popular songs from Flowers in the Dirt. It peaked at number 18 in the United Kingdom, number 30 in Australia, and at number 25 in the United States. It was McCartney's last top-40 hit on the Billboard Hot 100 until his 2014 collaboration with Kanye West, "Only One", and was the last Billboard top 40 hit by any former Beatle as a solo artist. Like other songs from Flowers in the Dirt, it has not been included on any of McCartney's compilation albums.

== Background and recording ==
"My Brave Face" was one of the first collaborations between Paul McCartney and Elvis Costello. McCartney noted of Costello's influence, "'My Brave Face' was one of the early things we did, and it became a single. I felt that Elvis was pulling it in a little bit of a Beatle-y way—a Beatle-ist direction—but it was fine by me."

"My Brave Face" was first recorded at sessions overseen by McCartney and Costello in early 1988. Excerpts from this session were eventually used in McCartney's documentary video Put It There, but other than that were not used. The final version of the song was recorded later the same year at Olympic Studios in London, with producer Mitchell Froom joining in on the work. During the overdub sessions, David Rhodes added an "EBow guitar" in a quick one-day session at Olympic Studios. According to the Put It There documentary, Costello requested that McCartney bring his iconic Höfner violin bass, which he had not played in years, to the recording session. To this day, Paul still uses this bass, in addition to the Rickenbacker 4001 and his Wal 5-String Customized.

In a 1996 interview, Costello noted the song as an instance where he indulged McCartney's darker side, explaining, "He's thought to be Mr. Sunny but he's got his dark moments, and I like that and really encouraged it. ... People might attribute that to me but he seems to be able to involve that darker side that's there. I haven't got my arm up his back when we're writing. Even 'My Brave Face', which was quite a bright-sounding pop song, is about a guy who's been left by his lover."

== Reception ==
Cash Box said that "there's a fine driving feel, a brilliantly scripted and melodic B-section-lift to the chorus—in short, a bunch of neat parts. It doesn't add up as well as some of Paul's greatest songs, but it’s certainly a muscular tune, enough to whet our appetites for Paul's upcoming LP Flowers in the Dirt."

== Music video ==
The music video for "My Brave Face" was shot in April 1989, directed by Roger Lunn. It was frequently seen on video channels that year, and it was released in 2007 on the three-disc collection The McCartney Years. It features a Japanese McCartney-fanatic who acquires McCartney memorabilia, films, and audio by means of robbery, and, allegedly, through Sotheby's. The video was shot in both black-and-white and in colour, and it features rare videos of him with The Beatles as well as with Wings. There is a video of him and the rest of the Beatles doing the Charleston, and him and Linda (as well as a visible Joe English in the background) being greeted by people in New Orleans. In the end, the Japanese fanatic gets arrested, and a clip of McCartney looking in the camera is shown, with 2007 McCartney voicing-over on the audio commentary, "What did you expect?" The video earned a nomination in "Best Video" category on the 1990 Brit Awards.

== Live performances and cover versions ==
McCartney included the song on his world tour in 1989–1990; a recording of it is included on the live album Tripping the Live Fantastic. It was also included in some of the small shows McCartney played in 1991. He has not performed the song since.

SR-71 recorded the song for the McCartney tribute album Listen To What The Man Said. Star Collector performed it for another tribute album, Love In Song: An Atlanta Tribute To Sir Paul McCartney.

== Track listings ==
This song was released on many formats, including the standard 7-inch single, a 12-inch maxi-single, a cassette single, and a CD single.

7-inch single

A. "My Brave Face"
B. "Flying to My Home"

12-inch and CD single

1. "My Brave Face"
2. "Flying to My Home"
3. "I'm Gonna Be a Wheel Someday"
4. "Ain't That a Shame"

== Personnel ==
- Paul McCartney – bass, guitar, tambourine, lead vocals
- Linda McCartney – background vocals
- Hamish Stuart – guitar, background vocals
- Chris Whitten – drums
- Robbie McIntosh – guitar
- Mitchell Froom – keyboards
- David Rhodes – EBow guitar
- Chris David – saxophone
- Chris White – saxophone
- Dave Bishop – saxophone

== Charts ==
Chart (1989)	Peak position
Australia (ARIA)	30
Belgium (Ultratop 50 Flanders)	16
Canada Top Singles (RPM)	18
Canada Adult Contemporary (RPM)	29
Europe (Eurochart Hot 100)	32
France (SNEP)	31
Ireland (IRMA)	6
Italy Airplay (Music & Media)	4
Netherlands (Dutch Top 40)	12
Netherlands (Single Top 100)	15
Norway (VG-lista)	4
Spain (AFYVE)	13
Sweden (Sverigetopplistan)	19
Switzerland (Schweizer Hitparade)	25
UK Singles (Official Charts)	18
US Billboard Hot 100	25
US Adult Contemporary (Billboard)	4
US Mainstream Rock (Billboard)	12
West Germany (GfK)	29
