= Sally G =

Single by Paul McCartney and Wings
- A-side: "Junior's Farm"
- Released: 25 October 1974
- Recorded: July 1974
- Studio: Sound Shop (Nashville, Tennessee)
- Genre: Country
- Length: 3:39
- Label: Apple
- Songwriters: Paul McCartney, Linda McCartney
- Producer: Paul McCartney

Paul McCartney and Wings singles chronology
"Band on the Run" (1974)	"Sally G" (1974)	"Listen to What the Man Said" (1975)

"Sally G" is a song written by Paul and Linda McCartney and performed by Paul McCartney and Wings. It was released as the B-side to the single "Junior's Farm" in October 1974.

== Writing, recording and release ==
McCartney composed the song during Wings' stay in Nashville, Tennessee after visiting a country music club in Printer's Alley. Like the A-side, it was recorded in Nashville in July 1974 during the same visit. The song has a strong country influence and includes contributions from Nashville session musicians Vassar Clements, Lloyd Green and Johnny Gimble, supporting Wings.

In the US, "Sally G" charted separately from "Junior's Farm" on Billboard's country chart and Hot 100, peaking at number 51 and number 39 respectively (number 17 when still listed with "Junior's Farm"). On the Easy Listening chart, it reached number 7. The song's debut album release was as a bonus track on the CD version of Wings at the Speed of Sound.

== Reception ==
Colin Irwin of Melody Maker called "Sally G" "pleasantly throwaway", describing it as "a charming, carefree little piece with generous helpings of deep south fiddle, steel guitar and round-the-campfire vocals. Lynne Thirkettle of Disc praised the lyrics, the pedal steel guitar and the violins. Sue Byrom of Record Mirror described it as "very pleasant and everything" but "not really something to set the turntables on fire." Charles Shaar Murray of NME said that it "is just pleasant McCartney pick-and-strum country fluff with the pedal steel player getting a chance to wander up and down his axe. Nothing to get hung about.

== Personnel ==
- Paul McCartney – vocals, acoustic guitar
- Linda McCartney – backing vocals
- Denny Laine – backing vocals
- Jimmy McCulloch – acoustic guitar
- Geoff Britton – drums
- Lloyd Green – dobro, pedal steel guitar
- Vassar Clements – violin
- Johnny Gimble – violin

== Charts ==
Chart (1974–1975)	Peak position
Australia (Kent Music Report)	11
Canadian RPM Top Singles	61
Canadian RPM Adult Contemporary Tracks	6
Canadian RPM Country Tracks	11
US Billboard Hot 100	17
US Billboard Easy Listening	7
US Billboard Hot Country Singles	51

=== Year-end charts ===
Chart (1975)	Rank
Australia (Kent Music Report)	77
