= Once Upon a Long Ago =

Single by Paul McCartney

from the album All the Best!
- B-side: "Back On My Feet"
- Released: 16 November 1987 (7"/ CD); 23 November 1987 (12")
- Recorded: March–July 1987
- Studio: Hogg Hill Mill (Icklesham, UK); Abbey Road Studios, London
- Genre: Rock
- Length: 4:08
- Label: MPL Communications; Parlophone Records
- Songwriter: Paul McCartney
- Producer: Phil Ramone

Paul McCartney singles chronology
"Only Love Remains" (1986)	"Once Upon a Long Ago" (1987)	"My Brave Face" (1989)

"Once Upon a Long Ago" is a song by the English musician Paul McCartney, released as his fortieth single on 16 November 1987, from his compilation All the Best!, released two weeks before the single. The track was produced by Phil Ramone and mixed by George Martin, and features violin by Nigel Kennedy.

The song was originally composed for the 1987 film The Princess Bride.

== Recording ==
Originally intended to be a duet with Freddie Mercury, Mercury turned it down due to conflicting commitments and the collaboration never materialized.

== Music video ==
Filming for the video commenced on 16 October 1987 in the Valley of Rocks, near Lynton in North Devon and concluded on 17 October. Appearing were McCartney (bass guitar), his wife Linda McCartney (synthesizer), Stan Sulzmann (saxophone), Nigel Kennedy (violin), and Chris Whitten (drums). Actor Fred Evans makes an appearance as Man with Broom. High winds and heavy rain precluded filming on the morning of the 16th so the crew filmed an indoor shot at Lynmouth town hall (this scene was not used in the final cut).

However, by late morning the weather had improved and although still windy, conditions were good enough to film at the Valley of Rocks. A local mountaineering instructor oversaw the rigging of a ladder so McCartney could safely access the top of Castle Rock for the guitar solo scene where a two way radio in McCartney's coat was used to relay a taped recording of the song. McCartney declined the use of a safety rope but did have to ask the helicopter to not fly so close when shooting aerial footage. Nigel Kennedy was only available on the second day of filming so the video was shot out of sequence with the guitar solo and end scene shot on the first day and the band scenes shot on the second day. Castle Air of Treasure Hunt fame were tasked with carrying out the aerial filming.

== Release and chart performance ==
The song was released in four versions: two different 12" singles feature "long" and "extended" versions (mixed by George Martin and Peter Henderson, respectively); the 7-inch single and the CD single (McCartney's first) feature an edit of the long version and a B-side from each of the two 12" singles, as well as "Back on My Feet", a b-side for all four iterations; and the album version featured on All the Best! contains an alternative ending. "Back on My Feet" was also the first released song from the songwriting collaboration between McCartney and Elvis Costello. Both 12" and CD singles also featured songs from McCartney's yet to be released cover album, Снова в СССР.

"Once Upon a Long Ago" reached No. 10 in the United Kingdom Singles Chart. The single was not released in the United States nor included on the US version of All the Best!, although it did appear on the longer UK/Canada version. The song also appeared on the promotional album Never Stop Doing What You Love. It was included on The 7″ Singles Box in 2022, which was the first time it had been included on any major US-released set.

== Charts ==
=== Weekly charts ===
Chart (1987–1988)	Peak position
Austria (Ö3 Austria Top 40)	17
Belgium (Ultratop 50 Flanders)	4
Canada Top Singles (RPM)	68
Italy Airplay (Music & Media)	4
Netherlands (Dutch Top 40)	6
Netherlands (Single Top 100)	11
UK Singles (Official Charts)	10
West Germany (GfK)	13

=== Year-end charts ===
Chart (1988)	Position
Belgium (Ultratop Flanders)	81

== Track listings ==
7-inch single (R 6170)

1. "Once Upon a Long Ago" – 4:12
2. "Back on My Feet" – 4:20

12" single, version one (12R 6170)

1. "Once Upon a Long Ago" (Long Version) – 4:34
2. "Back on My Feet" – 4:21
3. "Midnight Special" – 3:56
4. "Don't Get Around Much Anymore" – 2:51

12" single, version two (12RX 6170)

1. "Once Upon a Long Ago" (Extended Version) – 6:06
2. "Back on My Feet" – 4:21
3. "Lawdy Miss Clawdy" – 3:15
4. "Kansas City" – 4:00

CD single (CDR 6170)

1. "Once Upon a Long Ago" – 4:12
2. "Back on My Feet" – 4:21
3. "Don't Get Around Much Anymore" – 2:51
4. "Kansas City" – 4:00

== Once Upon a Video ==
Along with the single and the All the Best! album there was also released an 18-minute VHS for sale called Once Upon a Video, consisting of four music videos:

1. "Once Upon a Long Ago"
2. "Stranglehold"
3. "Pretty Little Head"
4. "We All Stand Together" – the music video was an edit of the songpart from the movie Rupert and the Frog Song

"We All Stand Together" was included on the UK/Canada-release of All the Best! along with "Once Upon a Long Ago".

== Personnel ==
- Paul McCartney – vocals, electric guitar, acoustic guitar, piano, bass, synthesizers
- Linda McCartney – background vocals, tambourine
- Nick Glennie-Smith – keyboards
- Tim Renwick – electric guitar
- Henry Spinetti – drums
- George Martin – orchestration, mixing
- Stan Sulzmann – saxophone
- Nigel Kennedy – violin
- Adrian Brett – flute
