= I'm Gonna Be a Wheel Someday =

Song by Fats Domino

from the album Let's Play Fats Domino
- A-side: "I Want to Walk You Home"
- Released: July 8, 1959
- Genre: R&B
- Length: 2:02
- Label: Imperial
- Songwriter(s): Roy Hayes; Fats Domino; Dave Bartholomew

"I'm Gonna Be a Wheel Someday" is a popular song written by Roy Hayes, Fats Domino and Dave Bartholomew. The song was first recorded by Bobby Mitchell in 1957 and released in the same year.

== Origin ==
The song's lyrics were written by factory worker and amateur songwriter Roy Hayes (b. 1935, Henderson, Louisiana), after hearing a throwaway comment by a fellow worker. He wrote the lyrics and forwarded them to Dave Bartholomew, who agreed to record the song as a demo. In 1957, Bartholomew recorded another version of the song with singer Bobby Mitchell, released as a single on Imperial Records. Though Mitchell's version was locally successful it did not reach the national charts.

== Fats Domino recording ==
When Bartholomew recorded the song again with Fats Domino in 1959 and released it as the B-side of "I Want To Walk You Home", it became a chart hit, reaching number 22 on the Billboard R&B chart.

== Chart history ==
Chart (1959)	Peak position
U.S. Billboard Hot 100	17
U.S. Billboard Hot R&B Sides	22

== Cover versions ==
"I'm Gonna Be a Wheel Someday" was later covered by:

- Sandy Nelson
- Wayne Fontana and The Mindbenders
- Boots Randolph
- Defenders
- Asleep at the Wheel
- Orion
- Herbie Hancock with George Porter Jr., Zigaboo Modeliste and Renard Poché
- Sheryl Crow
- Paul McCartney (1988; issued on the CHOBA B CCCP covers album)
- Teresa James & The Rhythm Tramps
