= Give My Regards to Broad Street =

1984 studio album by Paul McCartney

Soundtrack album / studio album by Paul McCartney
- Released: 22 October 1984
- Recorded: December 1982 – May 1984
- Studios: Abbey Road, AIR and CTS, London
- Genre: Rock
- Length: 43:52 (LP); 57:05 (Cassette); 61:03 (CD)
- Labels: Parlophone/EMI (UK); Columbia/CBS (US)
- Producer: George Martin

Paul McCartney chronology
Pipes of Peace (1983)	Give My Regards to Broad Street (1984)	Press to Play (1986)

Singles from Give My Regards to Broad Street
- 1. "No More Lonely Nights" Released: 24 September 1984

Professional ratings
Review scores
Source	Rating
AllMusic	2/5 stars
Encyclopedia of Popular Music	1/5 stars
The Essential Rock Discography	3/10
MusicHound	1.5/5 stars
Q	2/5 stars
The Rolling Stone Album Guide	2/5 stars

Give My Regards to Broad Street is the sixth solo studio album by the English musician Paul McCartney and the soundtrack to the film of the same name. It features cover versions of Beatles' songs, Wings and solo tracks by McCartney, as well as a few new songs. The album reached number 1 on the UK chart. The lead single, "No More Lonely Nights", was BAFTA and Golden Globe Award nominated. It was also to be his final album to be released under Columbia Records, which had been his US label for over five years.

== Songs ==
The majority of the album is a retrospective – sequenced in the order of the songs' appearance in the film – which features re-interpretations of many of Paul McCartney's past classics of the Beatles and Wings: "Good Day Sunshine", "Yesterday", "Here, There and Everywhere", "Silly Love Songs", "For No One", "Eleanor Rigby" and "The Long and Winding Road". There were also interpretations of songs from McCartney's more recent albums; "Ballroom Dancing" and "Wanderlust" from Tug of War and "So Bad" from Pipes of Peace. Besides "No More Lonely Nights" (also heard in a dance version), the only previously unheard tracks were "Not Such a Bad Boy", "No Values" and a symphonic extension of "Eleanor Rigby" entitled "Eleanor's Dream". The album running time was so long that its vinyl release had edited versions of the songs. The cassette and the later CD edition preserved the tracks' full lengths, while the CD went one further by including a bonus 1940s-styled piece called "Goodnight Princess". The Beatles cover versions are dedicated to McCartney's fellow Beatle John Lennon, who had been killed four years earlier.

== Release and charts ==
Preceded by "No More Lonely Nights (Ballad)", a worldwide Top 10 hit featuring guitar work by David Gilmour, Give My Regards to Broad Street entered the UK charts at number 1 and was certified platinum, while also going gold with a number 21 peak in the United States (where it sold and charted under expectations). It would also mark the end of McCartney's association with Columbia Records in the US, which began in 1979 with the final Wings album Back to the Egg. McCartney would re-sign with EMI Records worldwide (where he remained until 2007) with his Columbia output reverting to his new – and original – label in the US, Capitol Records.

Simultaneously with the film's premiere in November, McCartney's Rupert Bear recording, "We All Stand Together", started back in 1980 and credited to "Paul McCartney and the Frog Chorus", was released and became a hit single in the UK, reaching number 3. The accompanying animated film was shown in cinemas immediately preceding the main feature that was Give My Regards to Broad Street.

The soundtrack's original release was on Columbia Records in 1984 in North America. It was remastered in 1993 and reissued on CD as part of The Paul McCartney Collection series with two extended dance mixes of "No More Lonely Nights (playout version)" as bonus tracks.

== Track listing ==
=== LP ===
Side one
No.	Title	Writer(s)	Length
1.	"No More Lonely Nights" (ballad)	Paul McCartney	4:42
2.	"Good Day Sunshine" (original version on the Beatles album Revolver)	Lennon–McCartney	1:49
3.	"Corridor Music"	McCartney	0:19
4.	"Yesterday" (original version on the Beatles album Help!)	Lennon–McCartney	1:43
5.	"Here, There and Everywhere" (original version on the Beatles album Revolver)	Lennon–McCartney	1:45
6.	"Wanderlust" (original version on Tug of War)	McCartney	2:48
7.	"Ballroom Dancing" (original version on Tug of War)	McCartney	4:35
8.	"Silly Love Songs" (original version on Wings album Wings at the Speed of Sound)	McCartney; Linda McCartney	4:31

Side two
No.	Title	Writer(s)	Length
1.	"Silly Love Songs" (reprise)	McCartney; L. McCartney	0:36
2.	"Not Such a Bad Boy"	McCartney	3:19
3.	"No Values"	McCartney	4:13
4.	"No More Lonely Nights" (ballad reprise)	McCartney	0:13
5.	"For No One" (original version on the Beatles album Revolver)	Lennon–McCartney	1:58
6.	"Eleanor Rigby" / "Eleanor's Dream" (original version of "Eleanor Rigby" on the Beatles album Revolver)	Lennon–McCartney / McCartney	3:08
7.	"The Long and Winding Road" (original version on the Beatles album Let It Be)	Lennon–McCartney	3:47
8.	"No More Lonely Nights" (playout version)	McCartney	4:26

=== Cassette ===
Side one
No.	Title	Length
1.	"No More Lonely Nights" (ballad)	4:50
2.	"Good Day Sunshine"	2:11
3.	"Corridor Music"	0:19
4.	"Yesterday"	1:43
5.	"Here, There and Everywhere"	1:44
6.	"Wanderlust"	4:01
7.	"Ballroom Dancing"	4:36
8.	"Silly Love Songs"	4:29
9.	"Silly Love Songs" (reprise)	0:36
10.	"Not Such a Bad Boy"	3:46

Side two
No.	Title	Writer(s)	Length
1.	"So Bad" (original version on Pipes of Peace)	McCartney	3:10
2.	"No Values"		4:41
3.	"No More Lonely Nights" (ballad reprise)		0:13
4.	"For No One"		1:57
5.	"Eleanor Rigby" / "Eleanor's Dream"		9:13
6.	"The Long and Winding Road"		3:47
7.	"No More Lonely Nights" (playout version)		4:59
8.	"Goodnight Princess" (unlisted, hidden track on 1989 Capitol cassette reissue)	McCartney	3:58

=== CD ===
No.	Title	Length
1.	"No More Lonely Nights" (ballad)	5:13
2.	"Good Day Sunshine" / "Corridor Music"	2:33
3.	"Yesterday"	1:43
4.	"Here, There and Everywhere"	1:43
5.	"Wanderlust"	4:07
6.	"Ballroom Dancing"	4:51
7.	"Silly Love Songs" / "Silly Love Songs" (reprise)	5:27
8.	"Not Such a Bad Boy"	3:29
9.	"So Bad"	3:25
10.	"No Values"	4:12
11.	"No More Lonely Nights" (ballad reprise) / "For No One"	2:12
12.	"Eleanor Rigby" / "Eleanor's Dream"	9:10
13.	"The Long and Winding Road"	3:57
14.	"No More Lonely Nights" (playout version)	5:03
15.	"Goodnight Princess"	3:58

1993 bonus tracks (The Paul McCartney Collection)
No.	Title	Length
16.	"No More Lonely Nights" (extended version)	8:11
17.	"No More Lonely Nights" (special dance mix)	4:21

=== Notes ===
- Due to the length of the recording, the 1984 LP omits "So Bad" and "Goodnight Princess", edits out about six minutes of "Eleanor's Dream", and also sections of "Good Day Sunshine", "Wanderlust" and "No More Lonely Nights (playout version)". Additionally, "Goodnight Princess" is also excluded from the cassette edition.
- On the back of the LP cover, a remark alerts the listener:

This record is longer than usual but due to the available playing time on a vinyl disc, some editing of the soundtrack has been necessary to retain full volume and dynamic range. Even longer versions exist on cassette and compact disc.

- Track lengths on album notes do not include spoken sections between songs and so do not match CD timings. On the list above, these sections are included at the beginning of each track, as on the 1984 release, while on the remastered 1993 CD (listed above) they are mostly included at the end of the tracks.

== Personnel ==
- Paul McCartney – vocals (1–14), acoustic piano (1, 6, 13), all instruments (2, 14), acoustic guitar (3–5, 11, 12), electric harpsichord (7), bass guitar (8–10)
- Anne Dudley – synthesizers (1)
- Linda McCartney – synthesizers (1), vocals (1, 7–10, 14), acoustic piano (6), keyboards (7–10)
- George Martin – acoustic piano (2)
- Trevor Bastow – keyboards (13)
- Gerry Butler – acoustic piano (15)
- David Gilmour – lead guitar (1)
- Dave Edmunds – guitars (6, 8–10)
- Chris Spedding – guitars (6, 8–10)
- Steve Lukather – guitars (7), vocals (7)
- Eric Stewart – vocals (1, 9, 14), guitar (9)
- Eric Ford – guitars (15)
- Herbie Flowers – bass guitar (1, 13)
- John Paul Jones – bass guitar (6)
- Louis Johnson – bass guitar (7)
- Russ Stableford – double bass (15)
- Stuart Elliott – drums (1)
- Ringo Starr – drums (3–6, 8–10)
- Jeff Porcaro – drums (7)
- Dave Mattacks – drums (13)
- John Dean – drums (15), percussion (15)
- Jody Linscott – percussion (8, 10)
- Philip Jones Brass Ensemble – brass section (3–5)
- Jimmy Watson – lead trumpet (3–5)
- Henry MacKenzie – horns (6)
- Dougie Robinson – horns (6)
- Ray Swinfield – horns (6)
- Tommy Whittle – horns (6)
- Dan Willis – horns (6, 14)
- Jack Armstrong – horns (6)
- John Barclay – horns (6, 14)
- Alan Donney – horns (6)
- Larry Williams – horns (7)
- Charles Loper – horns (7)
- Jerry Hey – horns (7)
- Thomas Pergerson – horns (7)
- Dick Morrissey – saxophone (13)
- Stan Sultzman – horns (14)
- Chris Pyne – horns (14)
- Derek Watkins – horns (14)
- Derek Grossmith – alto saxophone (15), clarinet (15)
- Vic Ash – tenor saxophone (15)
- Eddie Mordue – clarinet (15), tenor saxophone (15)
- Chris Smith – trombone (15)
- Bobby Haughey – trumpet (15)
- Ronnie Hughes – trumpet (15)
- Jeff Bryant – French horn (11, 12)
- The Gabrielli String Quartet – strings (11, 12)
- Kenneth Silleto – orchestra leader (11, 12)
- Tony Gilbert – violin (15)
- Pat Halling – violin (15)
- Raymond Keenlyside – violin (15)
- Laurie Lewis – violin (15)

== Production ==
- George Martin – producer, arrangements
- Paul McCartney – arrangements
- Geoff Emerick – engineer
- Jon Kelly – engineer
- Stuart Breed – engineer
- Jon Jacobs – assistant engineer
- Roger Huggett – sleeve artwork
- Annie Carlton – sleeve design
- Sandra Leamon – sleeve design
- John Pasche – sleeve design
- Geoff Halpin – cover lettering
- Terry O'Neill – cover photography, inner sleeve photography
- David Dagley – additional sleeve photography

== Charts ==
=== Weekly charts ===
Chart (1984)	Peak position
Australia (Kent Music Report)	10
Canadian Albums (RPM)	23
Dutch Mega Albums (MegaCharts)	24
Japanese LPs (Oricon)	6
New Zealand Albums (RIANZ)	25
Norwegian Albums (VG-lista)	4
Spanish Albums (Promusicae)	4
Swedish Albums (Sverigetopplistan)	9
UK Albums (OCC)	1
US Billboard 200	21
West German Media Albums (Media Control)	25

=== Year-end charts ===
Chart (1984)	Position
Australian Albums (Kent Music Report)	85
Canadian Albums (RPM)	79
Japanese Albums (Oricon)	95
Spanish Albums (Promusicae)	15
UK Albums	27

=== Certifications and sales ===
Region	Certification	Certified units/sales
Canada (Music Canada)	Gold	50,000^{^}
Japan (Oricon Charts)	—	164,000
Spain (Promusicae)	Gold	50,000^{^}
United Kingdom (BPI)	Platinum	300,000^{^}
United States (RIAA)	Gold	500,000^{^}
^{^} Shipments figures based on certification alone.
