= Pretty Little Head (song) =

- UK front cover

Single by Paul McCartney

from the album Press to Play
- B-side: "Write Away" (7"); "Angry" (Remix) (12")
- Released: 27 October 1986 (7" and 12"); 17 November 1986 (cassette)
- Recorded: April–May 1985
- Studio: Hogg Hill Mill (Icklesham, UK)
- Genre: Electronic rock; pop rock; art pop; synth-pop; new wave
- Length: 5:14 (album version); 3:50 (7" version); 6:56 (remix) (12" version and cassette)
- Label: Parlophone
- Songwriters: Paul McCartney; Eric Stewart
- Producers: Paul McCartney; Hugh Padgham

Paul McCartney singles chronology
"Press" (1986)	"Pretty Little Head" (1986)	"Stranglehold" (1986)

Official video
- "Pretty Little Head" on YouTube

"Pretty Little Head" is a song by the English musician Paul McCartney, cowritten by McCartney, and 10cc guitarist Eric Stewart. The track is on his sixth solo studio album Press to Play (1986). The track was McCartney's 38th single, and his first which failed to chart, so, in an attempt to boost sales, he released his first ever cassette single. It still failed to reach the top 75.

== Release ==
The single was released at a length of 3:50 on the 7" release (remixed by Larry Alexander), and as a 6:56 remix (mixed by John Potoker) on the 12" release on the same day, 27 October 1986, and an extra track, "Angry", was added to the 12". A cassingle was also issued with the same track listing as the 12", and was released on 17 November 1986. Both of these lengths are different from the album version, which has a length of 5:14. (See Press to Play).

"Write Away", the single's B-side, is included only on the CD release of the album, resulting in the back of the single listing the A-side as "From the album" and the B-side as "From the compact disc".

== Music video ==
A music video, directed by Steve Barron, was recorded for the song, which features a girl running away from home after she witnesses her parents in an argument; she then finds herself in a big city. The girl is actress Gabrielle Anwar. Her father is played by Roger Lloyd-Pack, by then a familiar face in Britain for his role as Trigger in the sitcom Only Fools and Horses. McCartney appears only in a short cameo role, which he filmed in London on 18 October 1986. The beginning of the video contains an excerpt from "She's Leaving Home," a Beatles song written and performed in 1967, for the Sgt. Pepper's Lonely Hearts Club Band album.

== Critical reception ==
Reviews of the song, and the album as a whole, were mixed. Rolling Stone magazine described it as "dreamily abstract".

== Track listing ==
All songs written by Paul McCartney and Eric Stewart

7" single (R 6145)

1. "Pretty Little Head" – 3:50
  - Remix by Larry Alexander
2. "Write Away" – 3:01

12" single (12R 6145)

1. "Pretty Little Head" – 6:56
  - Remix by John 'Tokes' Potoker
2. "Angry" (Remix) – 3:36
  - Remix by Larry Alexander
3. "Write Away" – 3:01

== Charts ==
=== Weekly charts ===
Chart (1986)	Peak position
Belgium (Ultratop 50 Flanders)	29
UK Singles (Official Charts)	76

== Personnel ==
According to The Paul McCartney Project:

- Paul McCartney – lead and backing vocals, electric guitar, bass, drums
- Linda McCartney – backing vocals
- Eric Stewart – backing vocals, keyboards
- Jerry Marotta – vibraphone, percussions
