= Mary Had a Little Lamb (Wings song) =

- Picture sleeve

Single by Wings
- B-side: "Little Woman Love"
- Released: 19 May 1972
- Recorded: 27 March 1972
- Studio: Olympic, London
- Genre: Children's music
- Length: 3:30
- Label: Apple
- Songwriters: Paul McCartney, Linda McCartney
- Producer: Paul McCartney

Wings singles chronology
"Give Ireland Back to the Irish" (1972)	"Mary Had a Little Lamb" (1972)	"Hi, Hi, Hi" (1972)

Music video
- "Mary Had a Little Lamb (Countryside version)" on YouTube
- "Mary Had a Little Lamb (Barn version)" on YouTube
- "Mary Had a Little Lamb (Desert version)" on YouTube
- "Mary Had a Little Lamb (Psychedelic version)" on YouTube

"Mary Had a Little Lamb" is a song written by Paul and Linda McCartney and released as a non-album single by the British–American rock band Wings in May 1972 in the United Kingdom and in June 1972 in the United States. It is based on the traditional nursery rhyme of the same name.

== Background ==
"Mary Had a Little Lamb" was recorded at Olympic Studios in London from 27–30 March 1972, during the sessions for Wings' second album Red Rose Speedway. The other Wings members, particularly drummer Denny Seiwell and guitarist Henry McCullough, were confused that Paul McCartney had chosen a rendition of the nursury rhyme to be their next single. McCullough attributed it to McCartney's control of the band: "He's a strange guy like that. One would never query why we were doing 'Mary Had a Little Lamb'. Everybody would just tag along. He was the leader and had all the ideas, apart from odd bits here and there." Guitarist Denny Laine said that if he was in charge, he would have chosen a song that aligned with his music tastes. He later said in an interview that the song was "a nice song for kids, but it was wrong for the direction for the band." McCartney believed that, since there were other novelty records on the charts at the time, that listeners would be humming to the chorus of the nursery rhyme.

At the time, some observers such as Roy Carr and Tony Tyler of New Musical Express presumed McCartney recorded the song in response to the BBC ban of his previous single, the political "Give Ireland Back to the Irish", but McCartney has denied this, saying that it was a sincere effort to write a song for children. In fact, the song was written before "Give Ireland Back to the Irish", as a demo of the song can be heard during an interview recorded for radio station WRKO in December 1971. The song was mixed at Island Studios in London from 1–3 April 1972, with engineer Phil Ault. Short on songs for the B-side, McCartney selected the November 1971 mix of "Little Woman Love". For the front and rear cover and the labels, two illustrations by Clara Miller Burd were used, depicting a young girl feeding a group of lambs.

== Charts and reception ==
"Mary Had a Little Lamb" was released as a single on 19 May 1972 in the UK, moved back from its original planned date of the 5th. The record was released in the US on 5 June. In a press release, McCartney said: "It's a song for spring to make people feel happy." On 25 May, the band mimed a performance of the song for BBC TV's Top of the Pops TV show. Four different promotional films were also shot in June, each with a different setting labelled "barn", "countryside", "psychedelic" and "desert."

The song was attacked by several contemporary rock critics, with one commenting that McCartney had "fallen to tripe" of this genre. However, some critics suspected this immediate change in musical direction to be a deliberately ironic musical manoeuvre. Cash Box said of it that "the nursery rhyme we all know and love gets a bouncy treatment." Record World said it was "the familiar nursery rhyme set to a fine McCartney melody." It reached the top 10 in the UK, peaking at number nine. Some US radio stations also played the pop/rock B-side, "Little Woman Love". Apple Records in the US even revised the picture sleeve for the single to credit both sides by name (see reverse cover), but the single still failed to rise above number 28 in the US.

It was also included on The 7" Singles Box in 2022.

== Personnel ==
According to the author Luca Perasi:

- Paul McCartney – lead and backing vocals, piano, bongos, flageolet, Moog synthesiser
- Linda McCartney – lead and backing vocals
- Denny Laine – backing vocals, piano, electric guitar
- Henry McCullough – backing vocals, electric guitar, mandolin
- Denny Seiwell – backing vocals, drums
- Heather McCartney – backing vocals
- Mary McCartney – backing vocals

Note: Perasi is unsure if Laine played bass, nor if Seiwell played xylophone and flageolet.

== Charts ==
Chart (1972)	Peak position
Australian Go-Set National Top 40	17
Canadian RPM Top 100	41
Japanese Oricon Singles Chart	41
New Zealand (Listener)	13
UK Singles Chart	9
US Billboard Hot 100	28
US Cash Box Top 100	48
US Record World Singles Chart	38
