= This One =

1989 single by Paul McCartney

- 12-inch UK 4-track vinyl release cover

Single by Paul McCartney

from the album Flowers in the Dirt
- B-side: "The First Stone"; "Good Sign"; "I Wanna Cry"; "I'm in Love Again"
- Released: 17 July 1989
- Length: 4:10
- Label: Parlophone; Capitol
- Songwriter: Paul McCartney
- Producer: Paul McCartney

Paul McCartney singles chronology
"My Brave Face" (1989)	"This One" (1989)	"Où est le Soleil?" (1989)

"This One" is a single from Paul McCartney's 1989 album, Flowers in the Dirt. The song reached number 18 on the UK singles chart. It also reached number 8 on the Ö3 Austria Top 40 in Austria, number 31 in the Dutch Top 40 in the Netherlands, number 40 on the Media Control Charts in Germany and number 14 in Japan.

The single includes two songs recorded during the sessions for CHOBA B CCCP album: "I Wanna Cry" and "I'm In Love Again". The latter appeared in a slightly edited form than the version released on 1991 international edition of CHOBA B CCCP.

Like other songs from Flowers in the Dirt, despite the song's modest chart success, it was not included on any McCartney compilation album until The McCartney Years was released in 2007.

== Reception ==
Allmusic called the song "lovely". Rolling Stone opined that the song "extends its cute, lyrical conceit for too long and winds up taxing the listener's patience." Cash Box reviewed the single quoting from McCartney's song "Silly Love Songs" and claiming that McCartney "does them better than anyone I’ve heard since the ’60s." The song reached number 76 on the Eurochart Hot 100.

== Track listings ==
This song was released as a 7-inch single, a 12-inch maxi-single in three versions, a cassette single, and a CD single. All songs were written by Paul McCartney except where noted.

7-inch and cassette single

1. "This One" – 4:10
2. "The First Stone" – 4:03 (McCartney, Hamish Stuart)

7-inch single UK limited edition

1. "This One" – 4:10
2. "The Long and Winding Road" – 3:51 (Lennon/McCartney)

12-inch single 1

1. "This One" – 4:10
2. "The First Stone" – 4:03 (McCartney, Stuart)
3. "I Wanna Cry" – 4:40
4. "I'm in Love Again" – 2:40 (Fats Domino, Dave Bartholomew)

12-inch single 2

1. "This One" – 4:10
2. "The First Stone"- 4:03 (McCartney, Stuart)
3. "Good Sign" – 6:52

12-inch single 3 (Club Lovejoys mix)

1. "This One" (Club Lovejoys mix) – 6:10
2. "The First Stone"- 4:03 (McCartney, Stuart)
3. "I Wanna Cry" – 4:40
4. "I'm in Love Again" – 2:40 (Domino, Bartholomew)

CD single

1. "This One" – 4:10
2. "The First Stone" – 4:03 (McCartney, Stuart)
3. "I Wanna Cry" – 4:40
4. "I'm in Love Again" – 2:40 (Domino, Bartholomew)

== Personnel ==
Personnel are taken from the Flowers in the Dirt Archive Collection LP liner notes.

- Paul McCartney – lead vocals, acoustic guitar, bass, backing vocals, keyboards, rhythm guitar, tambourine, sitar, wine glasses, harmonium
- Linda McCartney – backing vocals
- Chris Whitten – drums, percussion
- Hamish Stuart – acoustic guitar, backing vocals, harmony vocals, rhythm guitar
- Robbie McIntosh – acoustic guitar, electric guitar
- Judd Lander – harmonica

== Charts ==
Chart (1989)	Peak position
Austria (Ö3 Austria Top 40)	8
Belgium (Ultratop 50 Flanders)	30
Canada Top Singles (RPM)	60
Europe (Eurochart Hot 100)	76
Ireland (IRMA)	27
Italy Airplay (Music & Media)	11
Netherlands (Single Top 100)	31
UK Singles (Official Charts)	18
US Billboard Hot 100	94
US Adult Contemporary (Billboard)	28
West Germany (GfK)	40
