= Hi, Hi, Hi =

- Label of the UK 7-inch single

Single by Wings
- A-side: "C Moon"
- Released: 1 December 1972 (UK)
- Recorded: 20 September 1972
- Studio: Abbey Road, London
- Genre: Glam rock
- Length: 3:07
- Label: Apple
- Songwriters: Paul McCartney; Linda McCartney
- Producer: Paul McCartney

Wings singles chronology
| "Mary Had a Little Lamb" (1972) | "Hi, Hi, Hi" / "C Moon" (1972) | "My Love" (1973) |

Alternative cover art
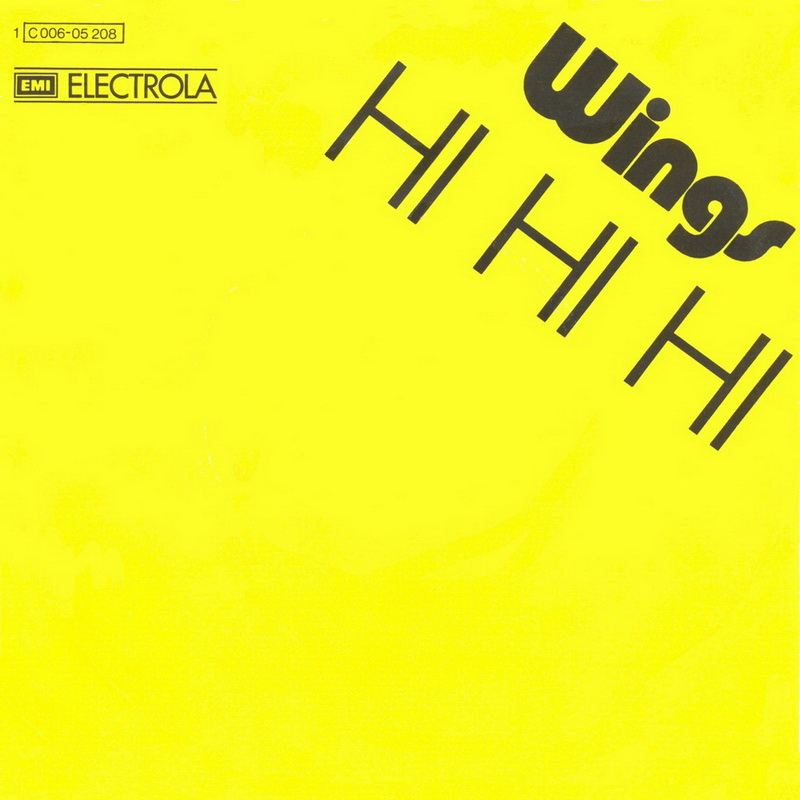
- Front cover of the German vinyl release

Official audio
- "Hi, Hi, Hi" on YouTube

"Hi, Hi, Hi" is a song written by Paul and Linda McCartney and performed by Wings. It was released as a double A-side single with "C Moon" in 1972.

== Release ==
The single was issued on 1 December 1972 in the UK and three days later in the US. The single peaked at number one in Spain, number five in the United Kingdom and at number 10 in the United States in January 1973. The song also peaked at number 18 in Ireland. The song became a staple of Wings' live shows in the 1970s.

The song was included on the compilation albums Wings Greatest (1978), Wingspan: Hits and History (2001), the deluxe editions of Pure McCartney (2016) and Wings (2025), and as a bonus track on the 1993 and 2018 reissues of Red Rose Speedway.

It was also included on The 7" Singles Box in 2022.

== Reception ==
Cash Box described it as "good old rock 'n roll as only the McCartney's can perform it, but with lyrics that more than suggest." Record World called it "a steady rocker with an infectious chorus and terrific instrumental breaks" and said that the "suggestive lyrics can only help this one go high."

== Ban ==
In the UK, the song was banned by the BBC for its sexually suggestive lyrical content. The BBC also assumed that the title phrase, "We're gonna get hi, hi, hi" was a drug reference. The specific lyrics objected to is the apparent phrase "get you ready for my body gun"; McCartney has said that the correct lyrics are "get you ready for my polygon", an abstract image, and later said, "The BBC got some of the words wrong. But I suppose it is a bit of a dirty song if sex is dirty and naughty. I was in a sensuous mood in Spain when I wrote it." Furthermore, Paul refers back to the song when it's played for a live audience—"Yeah, well, the great laugh is when we go live, it makes a great announcement. You can say "This one was banned!" and everyone goes "Hooray!" The audience love it, you know. "This next one was banned," and then you get raving, because everyone likes to. Everyone's a bit anti-all-that-banning, all that censorship. Our crew, our generation, really doesn't dig that stuff, as I'm sure you know."

== Personnel ==
According to the author Luca Perasi:

- Paul McCartney – lead and backing vocals, bass, electric guitar, organ
- Linda McCartney – backing vocals
- Denny Laine – backing vocals, electric guitar
- Henry McCullough – electric guitar
- Denny Seiwell – drums, cowbell

Technical

- Paul McCartney – producer
- John Leckie – engineer

== Charts ==
| Chart (1972–1973) | Peak position |
|---|---|
| Canada Top Singles (RPM) | 9 |
| Ireland (IRMA) | 18 |
| Japan (Oricon) | 26 |
| UK Singles (Official Charts) | 5 |
| US Billboard Hot 100 | 10 |
