= Stranglehold (Paul McCartney song) =

Single by Paul McCartney

from the album Press to Play
- B-side: "Angry (Remix)"
- Released: 29 October 1986 (US)
- Recorded: April–May 1985
- Studio: Hog Hill Mill (Icklesham, UK)
- Genre: Rock
- Length: 3:37
- Label: Capitol
- Songwriters: Paul McCartney; Eric Stewart
- Producers: Paul McCartney; Hugh Padgham

Paul McCartney singles chronology
| "Pretty Little Head" (1986) | "Stranglehold" (1986) | "Only Love Remains" (1986) |

Official audio
- "Stranglehold" on YouTube

"Stranglehold" is a song by the English musician Paul McCartney, written by McCartney and 10cc guitarist Eric Stewart for his sixth solo studio album Press to Play. It was issued as single in Canada and Japan as well as the US, where it reached number 81 on the US Billboard Hot 100 and number 75 on the US Cash Box Top 100. The B-side featured the remix of "Angry" by Larry Alexander taken from the previous single "Pretty Little Head".

== Critical reception ==
Los Angeles Times critic Terry Atkinson described the track as "an enjoyable, jazzy offer of new love". Cash Box called it a "mainstream rock ballad" with "well crafted melodies, flawless production and sterling musicianship." Billboard called it a "hopping boogie-blues with a hint of menace."

== Personnel ==
- Paul McCartney – vocals, bass, acoustic and electric guitars
- Eric Stewart – acoustic and electric guitars, backing vocals
- Jerry Marotta – drums
- Gary Barnacle – possible horns
- Dick Morrissey – possible horns

== Track listing ==
7" single(B-5636)

1. Stranglehold – 3:36
2. Angry (Remix) – 3:36
  - Remix by Larry Alexander

== Charts ==
=== Weekly charts ===
| Chart (1986–1987) | Peak position |
|---|---|
| Canada Top Singles (RPM) | 90 |
| US Billboard Hot 100 | 81 |
