= Hogg Hill Mill =

Post mill and recording studio in England

Hogg Hill Mill, Icklesham
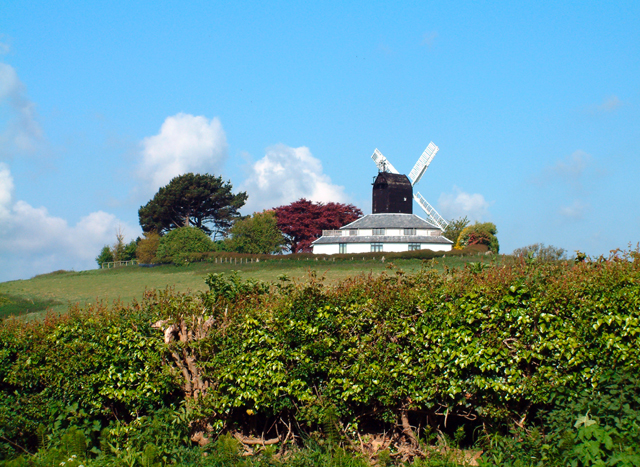
- The mill in 2005
- Interactive map of Hogg Hill Mill, Icklesham

Origin
- Grid reference: TQ 888 160
- Coordinates: 50°54′47″N 0°41′02″E
- Year built: 1781

Information
- Purpose: Corn mill
- Type: Post mill
- Roundhouse storeys: Two storey roundhouse
- No. of sails: Four
- Type of sails: Spring sails
- Windshaft: Cast iron
- Winding: Roof mounted fantail
- Fantail blades: Eight blades
- No. of pairs of millstones: Two pairs, arranged Head and Tail
- Other information: The only existing post mill in the United Kingdom retaining a roof mounted fantail.

Hogg Hill Mill is a post mill at Icklesham in East Sussex, England. It houses the private recording studio of Paul McCartney.

== History ==
Hogg Hill Mill was built in Pett in 1781 and moved to Icklesham in 1790. It was working by wind until 1920, when it was stopped, owing to a weak weatherbeam. The mill was also used as a filming location for the 1951 British crime drama film The Quiet Woman, directed by John Gilling. Today, the mill houses the recording studios of Paul McCartney. The mill has been listed Grade II on the National Heritage List for England since 1961.

== Description ==
Hogg Hill Mill is a post mill on a two-storey roundhouse. It has four spring sails carried on a cast iron windshaft and is winded by a roof-mounted fantail. It is one of only two surviving post mills in England with this feature, and the only one where this can still be seen. The mill drove two pairs of millstones, arranged head and tail. The brake wheel has been removed, but the wooden tail wheel is of clasp arm construction.

== Millers ==
- John Skinner 1781–1790 (Pett)
- William Sargeant 1791
- John Sargeant 1834–1855
- Lewis Sargent 1855–1874 (Source: census returns)
- Garndner Bros 1890–1920

== Recording studio ==
The English musician Paul McCartney bought the nearby Blossom Wood Farm in Peasmarsh in 1973 in hopes of raising his children away from the limelight. He bought Hogg Hill Mill in Icklesham in 1981.

After the recording studio expenses of recording his albums Tug of War and Pipes of Peace, McCartney felt he could have built his own studio for the same amount. He converted the windmill on the property into a private recording studio, Hogg Hill Mill, completed in 1985.
