= Twin Freaks =

Remix album by Twin Freaks
- Released: 13 June 2005
- Recorded: 2004
- Studios: Hogg Hill Mill (Icklesham, UK)
- Genres: Electronic, mashup
- Length: 53:45
- Label: Parlophone
- Producer: Freelance Hellraiser

Paul McCartney chronology
Back in the World (2003)	Twin Freaks (2005)	Chaos and Creation in the Backyard (2005)

Singles from Twin Freaks
- 1. "Really Love You" Released: 6 June 2005; 2. "What's That You're Doing" Released: 2005

Professional ratings
Review scores
Source	Rating
Encyclopedia of Popular Music	3/5 stars

Twin Freaks is an album by Twin Freaks, a duo composed of Paul McCartney and Freelance Hellraiser (Roy Kerr), released on 13 June 2005.

== History and structure ==
McCartney and Kerr created the double vinyl album as a continuation of Kerr's collaboration with McCartney from a 2004 tour. Kerr was known at the time for the mash-up album A Stroke of Genius, released in 2002.

Kerr performed a half-hour set prior to McCartney's 2004 gigs in which he remixed various McCartney tracks into unusual and often unrecognizable forms. Twin Freaks was the outgrowth of these manipulations.

All McCartney tracks on the album are reinvented.

The album was produced as a double vinyl and a digital download in Windows Media Audio (WMA) format. The cover features a painting by McCartney. The interior artwork features paintings that are similar in tone and style to artist Willem de Kooning, whom McCartney knew.

"Really Love You", backed with "Lalula", was released on 6 June 2005 as a one-sided 12" single, limited to 500 copies. A second single, limited to 200 copies, was of "What's that You're Doing" backed with "Rinse the Raindrops".

The album was re-released as a digital download on 24 April 2012 to iTunes and Amazon.

== Track listing ==
All songs written by Paul McCartney, except where noted.

Side one

1. "Really Love You" (Paul McCartney, Richard Starkey) – 5:42
2. "Long Haired Lady (Reprise)" (Paul McCartney, Linda McCartney) – 4:50
3. "Rinse the Raindrops" – 3:14

Side two

4. "Darkroom" – 2:30
5. "Live and Let Die" (Paul McCartney, Linda McCartney) – 3:26
6. "Temporary Secretary" – 4:12

Side three

7. "What's That You're Doing" (Stevie Wonder, Paul McCartney) – 4:57
8. "Oh Woman, Oh Why" – 4:19
9. "Mumbo" (Paul McCartney, Linda McCartney) – 5:24

Side four

10. "Lalula" – 4:25
11. "Coming Up" – 4:42
12. "Maybe I'm Amazed" – 6:12
