= The McCartney Interview =

Studio album by Paul McCartney
- Released: 4 December 1980
- Recorded: May 1980
- Genre: Interview
- Length: 54:13
- Label: CBS Records International

Paul McCartney chronology
McCartney II (1980)	The McCartney Interview (1980)	Tug of War (1982)

The McCartney Interview is a spoken word album featuring an interview of Paul McCartney by Vic Garbarini, recorded for the magazine Musician in May 1980. It was issued in the US on 4 December 1980, and release in the UK followed on 23 February 1981.

It is notable for being released just four days before the murder of John Lennon; therefore, it is the last release by any member of the Beatles during his lifetime.

== Track listing ==
Side One

1. "McCartney II"
2. Negative criticism of the Beatles and Wings
3. His influences
4. "Venus and Mars" / "Wild Life"
5. "Band on the Run"
6. Musical direction / Ringo / George / "Hey Jude"
7. "The White Album" / Tension / "Helter Skelter"
8. "Abbey Road"
9. Musical background / Trumpet, guitar, piano / Learning bass in Hamburg
10. Early Beatles mixes / Motown and Stax influences
11. The "Sgt. Pepper's" story / The Beach Boys' Pet Sounds
12. "Rubber Soul" / "Revolver"
13. Fame and success / Paul and John's reaction
14. Stage fright during The Beatles and Wings
15. How Wings started
16. New wave / Early Beatles
17. Creating The Beatles sound / "Love Me Do" and early songs

Side Two

1. The Beatles' conquest of America
2. Beatles' haircuts and image
3. Paying dues in Hamburg & Liverpool / Early tours
4. Weathering pressures / The break-up
5. Video of "Coming Up" / Reliving the Beatle image
6. Playing bass
7. Lennon-McCartney songwriting / Dislike of formula
8. Beatles' imitators
9. "I Am the Walrus" / The black carnation / "Sgt. Pepper" LP cover
10. New wave, Bowie, Ferry, Elvis
11. Pop music and radio
12. Getting married / Changing perspective / "Waterfalls"
13. "Give Ireland Back to the Irish", "Hi, Hi, Hi" / Banned songs / Children's songs / "Mary Had a Little Lamb"

== Personnel ==
- Paul McCartney: narration
- Vic Garbarini: interviewer

== Sources ==
- Badman, Keith (2001). The Beatles Diary Volume 2: After The Break-Up 1970–2001. London: Omnibus Press. ISBN 0-7119-8307-0.
