= Darkroom (song) =

Song by Paul McCartney

from the album McCartney II
- Released: 16 May 1980
- Recorded: June–August 1979
- Studio: Lower Gate Farm, Peasmarsh; Lower Ranachan Studio, Campbeltown
- Length: 2:20
- Label: Parlophone (UK); Columbia (US)
- Songwriter: Paul McCartney
- Producer: Paul McCartney

"Darkroom" is a song by Paul McCartney, released as the penultimate track on his third solo studio album McCartney II (1980).

== Background and production ==
"Darkroom" was the product of a recording practice McCartney did where he would often record a random drum track and improvise a new song over it, and McCartney said it could be about any type of dim lighted room; a darkroom for photography and film, a dark room for sex, or a literal dark room. The drums were recorded first, followed by other instruments and finally the vocals. Some of the drum and maraca parts were recorded at double speed. That is, McCartney recorded these parts and 15 inches per second but then played the tracks back at 30 inches per second. Then the rest of the parts, including snare drum, tom-toms, synthesizer, bass guitar and electric guitar, had to be recorded at 30 inches per second to match. According to McCartney biographers Allan Kozinn and Adrian Sinclair, this was done to get the timbre he was looking for, rather than to get a particular tempo for the song. Some of the vocals were also recorded at different speeds in order to achieve strange sounds. The song incorporated several synthesizer parts – one that sounds like an organ, one that sounds like string instruments and one that McCartney called "atmosphere synth", which Kozinn and Sinclair described as generating "high-pitched, transparent tones, that create an otherworldly texture." The song's harmony is based on an F minor seventh chord.

The song was recorded from June to August 1979 at Lower Gate Farm, Peasmarsh, and Lower Ranachan Studio, Campbeltown. The song was mixed in October 1979. Originally 11 minutes long, the track was edited down to 3:47 for the planned double album, before being edited down further to 2:20 for the official release. McCartney said at the time: "That's [a song] you can really tell I made up as I went along. The original version is a very long track and goes on through all sorts of crazy noises. I edited it down because I liked it and now it's on the album." The full-length version was later featured on the deluxe edition of McCartney II in 2011.

== Composition ==
Kozinn and Sinclair described "Darkroom" as an experimental song that is "a fairly conventional song form mixed with some sonic zaniness." They write that the melody as "slight but catchy," and the lyrics as being "almost an update" of the Beatles' early song "There's a Place" in which the earlier song's lyrics of "There's a place / Where I can go / When I feel low" are replaced by "Got a place we can go / Lights are low." They acknowledge that while "There's a Place" is about "solitary introspection", "Darkroom" is more social, with a bridge inviting the listener to "Come a come along with me to my darkroom." Author Luca Perasi describes the song as "a sort of experimental blues built on a drum and bass groove". Music professor Vincent P. Benitez described the song as having a "funky groove". He interpreted the lyrics as being "sexually suggestive".

== Release and reception ==
"Darkroom" appeared on McCartney II and was sequenced as the penultimate track, but it was almost cut from the final tracklist when McCartney had to reduce the album to a single disc. In a review for Rolling Stone, Stephen Holden called it "cluttered compared to its immortal prototypes". In a review for Consequence of Sound, Michael Roffman called it "another quasi-instrumental, though this one sports some vocals, although they hardly do much but chant again … and again … and again. It’s an exercise in sanity, really." Daily News writer Bill Carlton said he couldn't think of a single good thing to say about it, and called it a "reggae-disco abomination". Larry Kelp of Oakland Tribune called it a "silly love song".

In 2005, a remix of "Darkroom" was done by Twin Freaks, a duo composed of Paul McCartney and Roy Kerr, known as Freelance Hellraiser, for the remix album Twin Freaks.

== Personnel ==
According to authors John Blaney, Allan Kozinn and Adrian Sinclair:

- Paul McCartney – keyboards, drums, percussion, vocals, bass, electric guitar
