= Pipes of Peace =

Studio album by Paul McCartney
- Released: 31 October 1983
- Recorded: December 1980, January–May, September–December 1981, April, September–October 1982, January–February, July–August 1983
- Studios: AIR and Odyssey, London; AIR, Montserrat; Cherokee and Hollywood Sound, Los Angeles; Sigma Sound, New York City; Park Gates Studio, Battle, East Sussex
- Genre: Pop
- Length: 38:58
- Labels: Parlophone (UK), Columbia (US)
- Producer: George Martin

Paul McCartney chronology
Tug of War (1982)	Pipes of Peace (1983)	Give My Regards to Broad Street (1984)

Singles from Pipes of Peace
- 1. "Say Say Say" Released: 3 October 1983; 2. "Pipes of Peace" / "So Bad" Released: 5 December 1983

Pipes of Peace is the fifth solo album by the English singer-songwriter Paul McCartney, released on 31 October 1983 through Parlophone and Columbia Records. The follow-up to the highly successful Tug of War (1982), the album was produced by George Martin, who also produced the previous album. Recording for Pipes of Peace took place between December 1980 and August 1983; several tracks originated from the Tug of War sessions. A pop album, Pipes of Peace is more electronic-influenced than its predecessor. The album features two collaborations between McCartney and Michael Jackson, "Say Say Say" and "The Man". The former, released as a single, topped the charts in seven countries, including the US. "Pipes of Peace", released as the second single, was a UK number one for two weeks.

Commercially, Pipes of Peace failed to match the success of Tug of War, peaking at number four in the UK and number 15 in the US, becoming McCartney's first album not to reach the top ten of the Billboard Top LPs & Tape chart. Music critics generally dismissed it as safe and inferior to its predecessor, though some praised the production and vocal performances. Retrospective reviews have also been mixed. It has been reissued several times, including in 2015 as part of the Paul McCartney Archive Collection.

== Background and recording ==
Pipes of Peace was McCartney's second consecutive solo collaboration with producer George Martin, following his previous album Tug of War (1982). According to the author Luca Perasi, McCartney intended for the projects to be "twin albums". (Note: McCartney was reportedly going to title the album Pipes of Peace Tug of War II, but believed that title would be unfavourably compared to "trivial movie sequels" such as in the Rocky film series. Another working title was reportedly Hug Fo' Love.) At the time, McCartney stated:

Tug of War is supposed to be about the theme of opposites, dichotomy. The duality. [...] It's not easy to bring together two sides of the coin. In Pipes of Peace, I wanted to answer that question: 'How do you ever get the dualities together?' There's a little quote from Rabindranath Tagore, an Indian poet, 'In love all of life's contradictions dissolve and disappear.' It seems to me that that's the thing. In love, duality mystically goes away.

Pipes of Peace was recorded sporadically between December 1980 and August 1983. Recording halted in November 1982 when McCartney began filming Give My Regards to Broad Street. Four of the album's final eleven songs – "Hey Hey", "Sweetest Little Show", "Keep Under Cover" and "Average Person" – originated from the Tug of War sessions and were recorded from December 1980 and February 1981 at AIR Studios in London and Montserrat and at Park Gates Studio in Battle, East Sussex. The two collaborations with Michael Jackson – "Say Say Say" and "The Man" – were recorded in May 1981, (Note: Jackson previously covered McCartney's 1978 Wings song "Girlfriend" for his 1979 album Off the Wall. He and McCartney then duetted on Jackson's song "The Girl Is Mine" for the latter's 1982 album Thriller.) with final overdubs recorded in February 1983 in London.

Other songs were mostly recorded at AIR in London. These included "Tug of Peace" (in January 1982), "Pipes of Peace", "So Bad" and "Through Our Love" (in September 1982), and "The Other Me" and the outtake "It's Not On" (in January–February 1983). These sessions were engineered by Geoff Emerick, assisted by Jon Jacobs. The album featured contributions from Eric Stewart, bassist Stanley Clarke, drummers Steve Gadd, Dave Mattacks and Ringo Starr, McCartney's former Wings bandmate Denny Laine. Like Tug of War, Pipes of Peace was mixed at Montserrat using digital equipment.

== Composition ==
Paul McCartney and Michael Jackson in 1983. The two duetted on the songs "Say Say Say" and "The Man".

Pipes of Peace is a pop album containing both ballads and midtempo rockers. Unlike Tug of War, the album features an electro-tinged sound and, according to AllMusic's Stephen Thomas Erlewine, feels "fleet, adventurous, and modern" compared to its "consciously classical" predecessor. According to Martin, this stylistic change was deliberate:

When we started Tug of War, my thoughts to Paul were, 'Let's make a slightly harder, a more funky album than perhaps you have done in the past ... ' In fact, Pipes of Peace became more what we were looking for in Tug of War and certainly Michael Jackson's tracks seemed to get more of that dynamism.

The album opens with its title track, which was written after McCartney was told by the jazz musician George Melly that a local children's organisation wanted him to write a song about an optimistic future for children. According to Vincent Benitez Jr., McCartney wanted "Pipes of Peace" to be a "positive counterweight" to the more negative thoughts presented on "Tug of War". McCartney later described the song as an anthem for peace. "Say Say Say" blends funk with country and western and alternates between chorus and verse in its song structure. Lyrically, the song is about a troubled relationship. "The Other Me" explores the feeling of impostor syndrome; in his book The Lyrics: 1956 to the Present, McCartney stated it was an example of "be[ing] your own psychiatrist. You're reviewing your actions, admitting your faults and then looking for the solution which will make it better next time." Erlewine characterises it as a "bit of confession disgused as a synthesised soft rock lark", while he likens "Keep Under Cover" to the Wings album Red Rose Speedway (1973). In "Keep Under Cover", the verses use metaphorical questions about items losing their value when separated from their usual context, such as butter without bread, to set up the chorus, where the singer realises how empty he feels without his lover. "So Bad" is a homage to the quiet storm-era work of Smokey Robinson, with McCartney utilising falsetto vocals. McCartney's family, particularly his son James, inspired the song.

"The Man" is another duet with Jackson, which Ron Hart of Pitchfork considers to be "a little closer [to] Paul territory" in comparison with "Say Say Say" due to its "strummy acoustic charm and Wings-esque bombast". While the lyrics meant little to McCartney, Benitez Jr. argues that because the "man" is an immortal and powerful being, Jackson was recognising the importance of God in his life. "Sweetest Little Show" originated from a 1980 jam session with Wings guitarist Denny Lane, which Nick DeRiso credits with giving the track its "Wings-like exuberance". It combines the sound of the Temptations with country music, while the lyrics are about self-worth and resilience when faced with criticism. "Average Person" displays elements of music hall, with Erlewine citing it as an instance of the record's "whimsy slid[ing] right into silliness". According to McCartney, the track's music hall influences came from his father Jim McCartney, while the lyrics came from his idea that ordinary people have "hidden sides and ambitions".

"Hey Hey" is an instrumental that features a guitar riff similar to McCartney's Beatles song "Birthday" (1968). On the track "Tug of Peace", McCartney blends the title song to Tug of War with that of the new album; Erlewine describes the mix as "an almost-electro collage that twists the songs into McCartney II territory". Benitez Jr. describes it as "an upbeat version" of "Tug of War", with longer instrumental sections. Despite finding the mash-up to be ultimately "clunky", Hart argues that the track foreshadows McCartney's later electronic work on Liverpool Sound Collage (2000) and as the Fireman. The album closes with the ballad "Through Our Love", whose orchestral arrangement DeRiso compares to Phil Spector's work on the Beatles' album Let It Be (1970). It was dedicated to Linda McCartney, with lyrics about how love can conquer any obstacle.

== Release ==
"Say Say Say" was released as the album's lead single on 3 October 1983. It was a major commercial success, topping the charts in seven countries – Canada, France, Italy, Norway, Spain, Sweden and the US, where it was certified platinum. In the UK, it peaked at number two. To promote the single and accompanying music video, Paul and Linda appeared on The Late, Late Breakfast Show, their first live television studio appearance since 1973. Following "Say Say Say", the album's title track, released in the UK on 5 December 1983, became a UK number 1 for two weeks and was certified silver by the British Phonographic Industry (BPI). Its music video recreated the 1914 Christmas truce that occurred between British and German troops during World War I. In the US, the B-side "So Bad" hit number 23. "The Man" was intended for release as a single on 12 February 1984 but was cancelled by McCartney shortly before release.

Originally scheduled for release on 7 February 1983, Pipes of Peace was delayed several times before its official release on 31 October. (Note: The album's original UK release date was delayed on 17 October, reportedly because McCartney wanted the UK and US dates to be the same day.) Its cover artwork was photographed by Linda McCartney. The original gatefold sleeve featured song titles and images of musicians who played on the album. The inner sleeve featured song lyrics and two images: one of the painting Vincent's Chair with Pipe (1888) by Vincent van Gogh and one of the sculpture in chrome Van Gogh's Chair (1966) by Clive Barker. Paul promoted the album in December with interviews for Entertainment Tonight and MTV in London in the US and for the BBC Radio 1 programme Paul McCartney Now in the UK.

Commercially, Pipes of Peace failed to match the success of Tug of War. In the UK, it peaked at number 4, selling 300,000 copies, and number 15 in the US, becoming McCartney's first album not to reach the top 10 of the Billboard Top LPs & Tapes chart. It was, however, certified platinum by the Recording Industry Association of America (RIAA). Elsewhere, the album topped the chart in Norway and reached number 3 in Spain, 5 in Japan, 8 in Italy and 10 in Canada. According to McCartney biographer Howard Sounes, the album's commercial reception was "slightly disappointing, considering the quality of the work". According to Benitez Jr., some critics viewed the album as an artistic decline for McCartney that would last the rest of the decade.

== Critical reception ==
=== Initial reviews ===
Professional ratings
Review scores
Source	Rating
The Cincinnati Enquirer	2/5 stars
Record Mirror	3/5 stars
Rolling Stone	2/5 stars
Robert Christgau	B–
Smash Hits	5/10

Critical reaction was less positive than that which greeted Tug of War, with many calling Pipes of Peace inferior to that album. Several reviewers dismissed Pipes of Peace as a safe record compared to Tug of War; High Fidelity's Mitchell Cohen said that it replaces its predecessor's "tough-mindedness" in favour of "gumdrop music". In The New York Times, Stephen Holden wrote: "Where Tug of War meditated on polarity and conflict ... Pipes of Peace is a pastoral pop mosaic that preaches sweetness, light and tolerance in lovely but lightweight pop music and playfully childlike rhymes."

Others derided it as "insipid", "uninspired", "mediocre", "forgettable" and lacking "substance". Reviewing the album for the NME, Penny Reel described Pipes of Peace as "A dull, tired and empty collection of quasi-funk and gooey rock arrangements ... with McCartney cooing platitudinous sentiments on a set of lyrics seemingly made up on the spur of the moment." In Musician magazine, J. D. Considine was also negative towards Pipes of Peace, calling it an album which indicates that McCartney is "every bit as shallow as his severest critics have thought him to be". Record magazine's Craig Zeller described Pipes of Peace as "another lousy McCartney album with a couple of halfway decent cuts, a load of hummable pablum and the usual no-risk coasting." Robert Hilburn of the Los Angeles Times complimented Michael Jackson's appearances but otherwise found Pipes of Peace to be filled with songs that lack merit. Hilburn wrote that McCartney still displayed a knack for "delectable" melodies while simultaneously "exhibit[ing] a puzzling lack of ambition and judgment". Writing for Smash Hits, Mark Ellen said the album "has its moments" but mostly features songs that have nothing to say.

More moderately, The Indianapolis Star's Scott L. Miley argued that, while still inferior to Tug of War, Pipes of Peace retains "the power" of its predecessor and is overall a "step up" above most of his solo work, highlighting the Jackson collaborations and "Average Person". Miley further praised the musicality on "Sweetest Little Show" and "Hey Hey", but criticised the lyrics as "light". Overall, he wrote that while Pipes of Peace "doesn't darken McCartney's pop cleverness", it "veils the promise of Tug of War." Mikal Gilmore of the Los Angeles Herald Examiner described Pipes of Peace as "a wonderfully crafted disappointment", writing that it "puts forth a winsome hopefulness that ends up blithe at best, and disarmingly whimsical at worst". He nevertheless praised McCartney's vocal performances, particularly on "Say Say Say". In his review for Record Mirror, Jim Reid complimented the production but found it an album of "habit and routine" and "a decent effort for a man who's lost inspiration and edge".

=== Later reviews ===
Professional ratings
Review scores
Source	Rating
AllMusic	3.5/5 stars
The Encyclopedia of Popular Music	2/5 stars
The Essential Rock Discography	4/10
MusicHound	2/5 stars
Pitchfork	6.1/10
PopMatters	4/10 stars
Q	3/5 stars
The Rolling Stone Album Guide	2/5 stars

In lists ranking McCartney's albums from worst to best, Pipes of Peace has generally placed in the lower half or towards the bottom. Sounes views Pipes of Peace and its predecessor as "abounding with well-crafted tunes" that almost match the standard of McCartney's work with the Beatles; yet, he adds, the two albums "must be marked down for a surfeit of love ballads with lamentable lyrics". In AllMusic, Erlewine writes that while the album lacks the "gravitas" of its predecessor, it successfully showcases "an impeccable craftsman at play". Reviewing the 2015 reissue of Pipes of Peace, for Pitchfork, Ron Hart notes that, at the time of release, "Some critics derided McCartney for aging gracelessly", yet "a good listen to the album today reveals some ways it was ahead of its time." Hart writes of the song "Tug of Peace": "an early, primitive version of a mash-up that brought together the title cuts of these underappreciated albums. The blend is clunky, but it foreshadows his electronic music work as the Fireman and on Liverpool Sound Collage."

By contrast, Jeff Strowe of PopMatters argues that the album "presents McCartney at his most regrettable" and calls "Pipes of Peace" and "Tug of Peace" a "woefully underdeveloped title track" and a "dreadful mashup", respectively. Strowe writes more favourably of "Say Say Say", however, describing it as "catchy in that pure '80s manner", and highlights "Sweetest Little Show" and "Average Person" as "a nice one-two punch of refreshing creativity that give the proceedings a much needed spark of interest and vitality". Record Collector's Jamie Atkins found Pipes of Peace to be a "let-down" compared to Tug of War and representing the beginning of McCartney's artistic decline.

== Track listing ==
All songs written by Paul McCartney, except where noted.

Side one
No.	Title	Writer(s)	Length
1.	"Pipes of Peace"		3:56
2.	"Say Say Say" (feat. Michael Jackson)	McCartney; Jackson	3:55
3.	"The Other Me"		3:58
4.	"Keep Under Cover"		3:05
5.	"So Bad"		3:20

Side two
No.	Title	Writer(s)	Length
1.	"The Man" (feat. Michael Jackson)	McCartney; Jackson	3:55
2.	"Sweetest Little Show"		2:54
3.	"Average Person"		4:33
4.	"Hey Hey"	McCartney; Stanley Clarke	2:54
5.	"Tug of Peace"		2:54
6.	"Through Our Love"		3:28

Additional tracks on the 1993 CD reissue
No.	Title	Length
12.	"Twice in a Lifetime"	3:02
13.	"We All Stand Together"	4:25
14.	"Simple as That"	4:15

== Reissues ==
In 1983, Pipes of Peace made its debut on CD on Columbia Records. In 1993, the album was remastered and reissued on CD as part of The Paul McCartney Collection. Three bonus tracks were included on the latter release: the previously unreleased "Twice in a Lifetime" (the title song of the 1985 film Twice in a Lifetime); his 1984 hit from the Rupert Bear project, "We All Stand Together"; and "Simple as That", released in 1986 on the charity album The Anti-Heroin Project – It's a Live-In World.

The album was reissued in remastered form in 2015 as part of the Paul McCartney Archive Collection series of releases. The "enhanced packaging" version includes three discs: the remastered album, a bonus audio disc mostly of demo versions of the songs on the first disc, and a disc with a film. The reissue was accompanied by the Record Store Day exclusive single "Say Say Say (2015 Remix)".

=== Archive Collection reissue ===
In 2015 the album was re-issued by Hear Music/Concord Music Group as part of the sixth set of releases, alongside Tug of War, in the Paul McCartney Archive Collection. It was released in multiple formats:

- Standard edition 2-CD; the original 11-track album on the first disc, plus 9 bonus tracks on a second disc.
- Deluxe edition 2CD/1DVD Box Set + 112-page essay book and 64-page behind-the-scenes book about the music video for the song "Pipes of Peace"
- Remastered vinyl The albums are also available on special gatefold vinyl editions (vinyl editions include a download card).

Disc 1 – remastered album

All songs written by Paul McCartney, except "Say Say Say" and "The Man", co-written by Michael Jackson, and "Hey Hey", co-written by Stanley Clarke. The original 11-track album.

Disc 2 – bonus audio

1. "Average Person" (demo) – 4:05
2. "Keep Under Cover" (demo) – 3:44
3. "Sweetest Little Show" (demo) – 3:00
4. "It's Not On" (demo) – 2:56
5. "Simple as That" (demo) – 3:16
6. "Say Say Say" (2015 remix) – 6:59
7. "Ode to a Koala Bear" (B-side to "Say Say Say") – 3:48
8. "Twice in a Lifetime" – 3:02
9. "Christian Bop" – 2:03

Tracks 1–6 and 9 are previously unreleased.

Additional download tracks available via paulmccartney.com

1. "Say Say Say" (2015 remix – instrumental) – 3:41

Disc 3 – DVD

1. "Pipes of Peace" music video
2. "So Bad" music video
3. "Say Say Say" music video
4. "Hey Hey in Montserrat" (previously unreleased home movie footage, 3mins)
5. "Behind the Scenes at AIR Studios" (previously unreleased 6 min. edit)
6. "The Man" (previously unreleased home movie footage, 4 mins)

== Personnel ==
=== Musicians ===
- Paul McCartney – arrangements, vocals, acoustic piano, keyboards, synthesisers, guitars, bass guitar (except on 2, 4, 9), drums (1, 3, 4, 7, 10)
- Denny Laine – keyboards, guitars, vocals
- Bill Wolfer – keyboards (2)
- Linda McCartney – keyboards, backing vocals
- Eric Stewart – guitars, backing vocals
- David Williams – guitars (2)
- Hugh Burns – guitars
- Geoff Whitehorn – guitars
- Nathan Watts – bass guitar (2)
- Stanley Clarke – bass guitar (4, 9), vocals (9)
- Ricky Lawson – drums (2)
- Ringo Starr – drums (5, 8)
- Steve Gadd – drums (6, 9)
- Dave Mattacks – drums (11)
- James Kippen – tabla (1)
- Michael Jackson – percussion (2, 6), vocals (2, 6)
- Chris Hammer Smith – harmonica (2)
- Andy Mackay – saxophones
- Ernie Watts – saxophones (2)
- Gary Herbig – flute
- Gary Grant – horns (2)
- Jerry Hey – horns (2)
- Gavyn Wright – violin
- George Martin – arrangements, bicycle wheel, garden canes (10), acoustic piano (11)
- Pestalozzi's Children's Choir – backing vocals (1)

String section

- Kenneth Sillito – orchestra leader
- Adrian Shepherd – conductor (7)
- Kenneth Essex, Patrick Halling, Anthony Harvey, Alexander Kok, Alan J. Peters, Michael Rennie, Galina Solodchin, George Turnlund, John Underwood, Denis Vigay, Peter Willison and Gavyn Wright – string players

=== Production ===
- George Martin – producer
- Geoff Emerick – engineer
- Jon Jacobs – assistant engineer
- Mike Stavrou – assistant engineer
- Alex Wharton – mastering

=== Packaging ===
- Clive Barker – artwork (chrome sculpture)
- Vincent van Gogh – artwork (chair and pipe)
- YES – creative direction, design
- Linda McCartney – cover photography

== Charts ==
=== Weekly charts ===
Original album
Chart (1983–84)	Peak position
Australian Kent Music Report	9
Austrian Albums Chart	15
Canadian RPM Albums Chart	10
Dutch Mega Albums Chart	11
French SNEP Albums Chart	13
Japanese Oricon LPs Chart	5
New Zealand Albums Chart	38
Norwegian VG-lista Albums Chart	1
Spanish Albums Chart	3
Swedish Albums Chart	4
Swiss Albums Chart	12
UK Albums Chart	4
US Billboard Top LPs & Tape	15
West German Media Control Albums Chart	20

Reissue
Chart (2015)	Peak position
German Albums (Offizielle Top 100)	33
UK Albums Chart	56
US Billboard 200	70

=== Year-end charts ===
Chart (1983)	Position
Australian Albums Chart	89
French Albums Chart	43
UK Albums Chart	33
Chart (1984)	Position
Australian Albums Chart	94
Canadian Albums Chart	87
Japanese Albums Chart (Oricon)	45
Spanish Albums Chart	9
UK Albums Chart	67
US Billboard Pop Albums	98

== Certifications and sales ==
Region	Certification	Certified units/sales
Canada (Music Canada)	Platinum	100,000^{^}
Japan (Oricon Charts)	—	201,000
United Kingdom (BPI)	Platinum	300,000^{^}
United States (RIAA)	Platinum	1,000,000^{^}
^{^} Shipments figures based on certification alone.
