= One of These Days (Paul McCartney song) =

Song by Paul McCartney

from the album McCartney II
- Released: 16 May 1980
- Recorded: Summer 1979
- Studio: McCartney's home (Sussex); Spirit of Ranachan (Campbeltown)
- Length: 3:25
- Label: Parlophone (UK); Columbia (US)
- Songwriter: Paul McCartney
- Producer: Paul McCartney

"One of These Days" is a song by the English musician Paul McCartney, released as the final track on his third solo studio album McCartney II (1980). The song is one of McCartney's peace songs. It was recorded by McCartney on only an acoustic guitar and his vocals.

== Background ==
McCartney had the idea for "One of These Days" after a supporter of Hare Krishna, a Hindu religious organization, visited McCartney at his house. Inspired by the 'gentle vibe' the man exhibited, McCartney began to write a song that matched the demeanor, with an optimistic central theme that "[o]ne of these days I'll do what I've been meaning to do the rest of my life", according to McCartney." Due to its peaceful feeling, many people believed the song was recorded after McCartney's release from Japanese prison because of marijuana possession,. but the song was actually recorded in the summer of 1979 at McCartney's home studio in Sussex and at the Low Ranchan Farm in Campbeltown, before McCartney's arrest in January 1980. Mixing was completed in October 1979.

== Music and lyrics ==
"One of These Days" is an acoustic ballad that uses heavy reverb. The only instrumentation is McCartney's acoustic guitar. McCartney's lead vocal is double-tracked, as is his harmony vocal. The main guitar part is also double-tracked, and an additional guitar part is echoed on a separate track.

"One of These Days" is primarily in the key of G major, although a capo makes it appear to sound in A♭ major. The chords in the accompaniment to the song are mostly diatonic, which is consistent with the song's "gentle melody", although the bridge also incorporates chromatic chords. Music professor Vincent P. Benitez commented on the contrast in the chord structure between how the verses end compared to how the chorus ends. He said that the verses end with the harmony moving from C major to D major, i.e., the subdominant key to the dominant key, which he felt is consistent with the verses' "open ended nature". On the other hand, the chorus ends with a movement from C major to G major, i.e., subdominant key to tonic key, which is consistent with the singer resolving to do what is right for himself in the chorus. Benitez also noted that besides incorporating chromatic chords, the bridge uses a D minor seventh chord on the significant words "there" and "found", intensifying their impact.

Robert Rodriguez analyzed the lyrics as a "simple expression of all the [...] soul-satisfying things an individual might vow to do in the future, once life has stopped getting in the way." Benitez similarly interpreted the lyrics as the singer advocating for himself to remove the things that prevent him from being happy and self-fulfilled. McCartney biographers Allan Kozinn and Adrian Sinclair interpreted the lyrics as reflecting an aspiration for simplicity.

== Release and reception ==
American Songwriter critic Jim Beviglia wrote that it "contains one of those pillowy McCartney melodies that seems simple, at least until you realize no other writers are coming up with anything quite so pretty. The song proved that he could easily go into tender ballad mode when inspired. Even while making one of his wackiest records." Author John Blaney wrote that it "offers stark contrast to the frantic, mechanical clatter or pseudo-funk grooves of the album’s improvised songs" Pitchfork critic Joe Tangari calls it "simply great, benefiting from a rudimentary approach that strips away the synths and drum machines that dominate McCartney II" Benitez writes that "This ethereal, reflective song contrasts greatly with the mechanical sounds found on most of McCartney II." McCartney biographer Tom Doyle believed that it could have came from The Beatles by the Beatles, noting that it "captured Paul peering into the future with a certain serenity, writing in the becalmed hours after a visit from an acquaintance who was devoted to Hare Krishna." Messenger-Press critic Steve Wosahla criticized the lyrics for using random, incomplete and insipid images. Dayton Daily News critic Don Reynolds criticized it as a "horrid" song that has a melody that becomes stale. Courier News critic Phil Cornell found it to be a beautiful conclusion to the album, stating that it could be McCartney's message to his fans. Kingston Whig-Standard reporter Derek Jewell called "One of the These Days" and another song from McCartney II, "Waterfalls" "McCartney's most memorable work since the 1960s". Hartford Courant critic Henry McNulty praised it as a "perfect vehicle for McCartney's family sentiments" and a song whose style works as a home recording. Oakland Tribune critic Larry kelp praised it as "one of the most beautiful ballads McCartney has come up with in a decade." Ultimate Classic Rock critic Nick DeRiso ranked it as McCartney's 14th best "deep cut", praising it as being "quietly effective" despite McCartney double tracking and "weirdly" synthesizing his vocal.
