= So Bad =

So Bad may refer to:

- "So Bad" (Paul McCartney song), a 1983 song by Paul McCartney
- "So Bad" (STAYC song), a 2020 song by STAYC
- "So Bad," a 2019 song by Gesaffelstein from the album Hyperion (Gesaffelstein album)
- "So Bad," a 2020 song by JoJo from the album Good to Know
