= Pipes of Peace (song) =

1983 song by Paul McCartney

Single by Paul McCartney

from the album Pipes of Peace
- B-side: "So Bad"
- Released: 5 December 1983
- Recorded: 10 September 1982
- Studio: AIR, London
- Genre: Pop
- Length: 3:56 (album version); 3:24 (7" version)
- Label: Parlophone
- Songwriter: Paul McCartney
- Producer: George Martin

Paul McCartney singles chronology
"Say Say Say" (1983)	"Pipes of Peace" (1983)	"No More Lonely Nights" (1984)

Music video
- ”Pipes of Peace” on YouTube

"Pipes of Peace" is a song written by the English musician Paul McCartney and the title track on his 1983 studio album of the same name. It was released in December 1983 as a single and reached No. 1 on the UK singles chart for two weeks and No. 1 on the Irish Singles Chart for two weeks in January 1984.

In the United States, "Pipes of Peace" was issued as the B-side as its British B-side, "So Bad", was the A-side. "So Bad" reached number 23 at the US Billboard Hot 100 and reached number 3 on the Billboard Adult Contemporary chart. "So Bad" peaked at 18 on the Canadian RPM Chart (and two weeks at No. 2 AC).

The song was included on the UK and Canada version of the 1987 compilation All the Best!, the 2001 compilation Wingspan: Hits and History and the 2016 compilation Pure McCartney.

== Recording ==
The basic track was recorded on 10 September 1982 at AIR Studios, with orchestral overdubs added later. McCartney plays piano, bass and knee-percussion, while tabla was added by James Kippen, who tried "something like 20–30 takes" before McCartney was satisfied. A special session was organised to have the Pestalozzi Children Choir adding their voices.

== Music video ==
At Chobham Common, Surrey, a video was shot for "Pipes of Peace", depicting the famous 1914 Christmas truce between British and German troops. It portrays a British and a German soldier, both played by McCartney, who meet up in No Man's Land and exchange photos of their loved ones while other soldiers fraternise and play football. When a shell blast forces the two armies to retreat to their own trenches both men realise that they still have each other's pictures. The video was produced by Hugh Symonds, featured more than 100 extras and, for added realism, McCartney had his hair cut short especially for the shoot.

== Personnel ==
- Paul McCartney – vocals, bass, piano, synthesizer, knee-percussion, drums, orchestra arrangements
- Linda McCartney – backing vocals
- Eric Stewart – backing vocals
- Adrian Brett – pan flute
- David Bone – keys
- James Kippen – tabla
- Pestalozzi Children Choir – choir

== Cover versions ==
Argentine singer-songwriter Sergio Denis recorded a Spanish version of the song re-titled Pipas de la paz on his album La Humanidad (1984).

In 2017, the American indie pop band Muna covered the song for Capitol Music Group’s compilation Holidays Rule Vol. 2.

== See also ==
- List of anti-war songs

== Charts ==
Chart (1983–1984)	Peak position
Ireland (IRMA)	1
UK Singles (Official Charts)	1
