= Take It Away (Paul McCartney song) =

Single by Paul McCartney

from the album Tug of War
- B-side: "I'll Give You a Ring" (7"); "I'll Give You a Ring" / "Dress Me Up as a Robber" (12")
- Released: 26 April 1982 (Tug of War album); 21 June 1982 (7"); 5 July 1982 (12")
- Recorded: 16–18 February 1981
- Studio: AIR Studios (Montserrat)
- Genre: Pop
- Length: 4:13 (album version); 3:59 (single/video version)
- Label: Parlophone; EMI
- Songwriter: Paul McCartney
- Producer: George Martin

Paul McCartney singles chronology
"Ebony and Ivory" (1982)	"Take It Away" (1982)	"Tug of War" (1982)

Music video
- "Take It Away" on YouTube

"Take It Away" is a single by the English musician Paul McCartney from his third solo studio album Tug of War (1982). The single spent sixteen weeks on the US Billboard Hot 100 singles chart, reaching #10 and spending five consecutive weeks at that position. It reached #15 in the UK. The music video, directed by John Mackenzie, features former Beatles drummer Ringo Starr, long-time producer George Martin, and songwriting collaborator Eric Stewart, all of whom played on the track, as well as actor John Hurt, Linda McCartney and Barbara Bach.

Although there is a segue from "Tug of War" into this song on the album, the single version instead starts cleanly but fades out earlier at the end.

== Track listings ==
7" single

1. "Take It Away" – 3:59
2. "I'll Give You a Ring" – 3:05

12" single (black vinyl everywhere else; clear yellow vinyl in Japan)

1. "Take It Away" – 3:59
2. "I'll Give You a Ring" – 3:05
3. "Dress Me Up as a Robber" – 2:40

== Personnel ==
"Take It Away"

- Paul McCartney – lead and backing vocals, bass, acoustic guitar, piano
- Linda McCartney – backing vocals
- Eric Stewart – electric guitar, backing vocals
- Ringo Starr – drums
- Steve Gadd – drums
- George Martin – electric piano

"I'll Give You a Ring"

- Paul McCartney – vocals, electric guitar, bass, piano, drums
- Tony Coe – clarinet
- Linda McCartney – backing vocals
- Eric Stewart – backing vocals

"Dress Me Up As A Robber"

- Paul McCartney – vocals, bass, guitars
- Linda McCartney – backing vocals
- Denny Laine – electric guitar, synthesizer
- George Martin – electric piano
- Dave Mattacks – drums, percussion

== Critical reception ==
Billboard called it "a superior single that fuses a driving rhythm with a sleek, polished production" and said it was McCartney's "most assured, seamless, irresistible" single since the mid-1970s. Cash Box said that it's a "dense, multi-layered pop confection" that "keeps the listener on his/her toes throughout the song, going from a lazy tropical-type rhythm to a galloping brass section." Ultimate Classic Rock critic Nick DeRiso rated it as the best song on Tug of War, stating that it starts "with an off-kilter rhythm courtesy of Ringo Starr and all of the tasteful hallmarks of a George Martin production" and becomes "one of McCartney's patented pop confections, featuring a feverish horn counterpoint, deceptively intricate bass, and an utterly indecipherable narrative." DeRiso also praised Eric Stewart's backing vocals.

== Chart performance ==
=== Weekly charts ===
Chart (1982)	Peak position
Australian Kent Music Report	18
Belgian Singles Chart (Flanders)	28
Canadian RPM Top 100 Singles	17
Canadian RPM Adult Contemporary	2
Dutch Singles Chart	43
Irish Singles Chart	26
Luxembourg (Radio Luxembourg)	11
New Zealand Singles Chart	30
Norwegian VG-lista Singles Chart	7
UK Singles Chart	15
US Billboard Hot 100	10
US Billboard Adult Contemporary	6
US Billboard Mainstream Rock	39
US Cash Box Top 100	6
West German Media Control Singles Chart	46

=== Year-end charts ===
Chart (1982)	Position
US Billboard Hot 100	70
US Billboard Top AC Singles	47
US Cash Box Top 100	45
