= Tug of War (Paul McCartney song) =

Single by Paul McCartney

from the album Tug of War
- B-side: "Get It"
- Released: 6 September 1982
- Recorded: March–December 1981
- Studio: Parkgate, Catsfield; AIR, Montserrat; AIR, London
- Length: 4:20 (album): 4:00 (single)
- Label: Parlophone; EMI
- Songwriter: Paul McCartney
- Producer: George Martin

Paul McCartney singles chronology
"Take It Away" (1982)	"Tug of War" (1982)	"The Girl Is Mine" (1982)

"Tug of War" is the title track from Paul McCartney's third solo studio album Tug of War (1982).

== Release and reception ==
Rolling Stone described the song as McCartney's equivalent to John Lennon's "Imagine". The song has a clear division between the verses featuring sad lyrics about the struggle to survive, the necessity of conflict (pushing and pulling) and the hopeful refrain, in which McCartney looks for a future where these struggles are no longer necessary. The lyrics have been interpreted as a description of his complex relationship with Lennon, who was killed two years prior. Ultimate Classic Rock critic Michael Gallucci interpreted it as "a mournful meditation that could be interpreted as commentary on McCartney's splintered relationship with Lennon."

Cash Box said that the song is "an intriguing mix of the acoustic and the symphonic," saying that "guitar blends with strings while Paul sings of the constant push and pull in our present lives and a more optimistic 'time to come' when 'we will be dancing to the beat played on a different drum.'" Billboard called it a "wistful slice of pop philosophy given depth by George Martin's orchestration and the vocalist's graceful transition from stately verses to urgent bridge."

The single reached number 11 in Poland and number 53 in the both UK and the US. It also reached number 31 on the Billboard Adult Contemporary chart.

The album version starts with the sounds of people grunting as part of a real tug of war—a popular sporting event since ancient times, before Paul goes into the song. These sounds were recorded during the National Indoors Tug of War Championship in Huddersfield, by Eddie Klein on December 7 1980, one day before his bandmate John Lennon was shot and killed. At the end of the song, it fades into "Take It Away". The single version omits these factors.

== Music video ==
The music video for "Tug of War" was directed by Maurice Phillips.

== Personnel ==
- Paul McCartney – lead and backing vocals, acoustic guitar, electric guitar, bass guitar, synthesizer, drums, Mellotron
- Linda McCartney – backing vocals
- Eric Stewart – electric guitar, backing vocals
- Denny Laine – electric guitar
- Campbell Maloney – military snares
- Kenneth Sillito – orchestral arrangement

== Track listing ==
7" single

1. "Tug of War"
2. "Get It" (with Carl Perkins)

== Charts ==
=== Weekly charts ===
Chart (1982)	Peak position
UK Singles (OCC)	53
US Billboard Hot 100	53
