= Tug of War (Paul McCartney album) =

Studio album by Paul McCartney
- Released: 26 April 1982
- Recorded: December 1980; February–December 1981
- Studios: AIR (London); AIR (Montserrat)
- Genre: Rock
- Length: 41:10
- Labels: Parlophone (UK); Columbia (US)
- Producer: George Martin

Paul McCartney chronology
The McCartney Interview (1980)	Tug of War (1982)	Pipes of Peace (1983)

Paul McCartney studio album chronology
McCartney II (1980)	Tug of War (1982)	Pipes of Peace (1983)

Singles from Tug of War
- 1. "Ebony and Ivory" Released: 29 March 1982; 2. "Take It Away" Released: 21 June 1982; 3. "Tug of War" Released: 6 September 1982

Tug of War is the fourth solo studio album by the English musician Paul McCartney, released on 26 April 1982. It is his 11th album overall following the breakup of the Beatles in 1970, his first album released after the dissolution of his band Wings the previous year, and his first album following the murder of his former songwriting partner John Lennon. The cover features an abstract oil painting by the artist Brian Clarke, a frequent McCartney collaborator, incorporating an overpainted transparency of a portrait of Paul taken by Linda McCartney.

Tug of War was produced by former Beatles producer George Martin and was a number-one hit in many countries, selling over one million copies in the United States in the year of its release. The 2015 re-release, in a remastered deluxe edition, received a nomination for Best Boxed or Special Limited Edition Package at the 59th Annual Grammy Awards.

== Recording ==
Following the release of the solo album McCartney II, McCartney's band Wings regrouped in July and October 1980 to rehearse several songs which later appeared on Tug of War and Pipes of Peace. Feeling the need for direction, McCartney called upon his former producer, George Martin, to begin recording a song written for the animated Rupert Bear character (to which McCartney acquired the film rights in 1970), titled "We All Stand Together", among others. The productive sessions continued until 9 December, the morning McCartney woke up to learn that his former songwriting partner and fellow ex-Beatle, John Lennon, had been murdered in New York City the previous night. Abandoning that day's session (in which he and Denny Laine were recording future B-side "Rainclouds") part-way through, both Martin and McCartney felt it was best to leave the project for the time being and start anew once they were ready.

In February 1981, two months after Lennon's death, McCartney resumed the sessions, recording that month with Stevie Wonder, Stanley Clarke, Carl Perkins and Ringo Starr, and laying down several songs in the process. The sessions were held at AIR Studios in Montserrat, in the Caribbean, and lasted from 3 February to 2 March, ending with "Ebony and Ivory" and "What's That You're Doing", two songs featuring Stevie Wonder. 10cc guitarist Eric Stewart also became a frequent collaborator of McCartney during this period. Further sessions were undertaken that summer at Martin's AIR Studios in Oxford Street, London. The sessions were so productive that several resulting tracks were held over for McCartney's next album, Pipes of Peace, which followed in 1983. The rest of 1981 was spent in a quiet fashion, with McCartney and Martin giving the finishing touches to the album.

== Release, critical reception, and aftermath ==
Professional ratings
Review scores
Source	Rating
AllMusic	4.5/5 stars
Robert Christgau	B+
The Encyclopedia of Popular Music	3/5 stars
The Great Rock Discography	5/10
Pitchfork	6.7/10
PopMatters	7/10 stars
Q	3/5 stars
Rolling Stone	5/5 stars
The Rolling Stone Album Guide	3.5/5 stars
Uncut	9/10

In a contemporary review for Rolling Stone, music critic Stephen Holden hailed Tug of War as "the masterpiece everyone has always known Paul McCartney could make", and particularly admired its vivid music and consistent songwriting. In The Boston Phoenix, M. Howell felt that the album "is bouncy, joyful, sweet and melodic—things we expect from Paul McCartney. It's also frightened and fierce—things he’s not supposed to be. To say that Tug of War is a far better record than McCartney’s ever made is to slight it—Tug of War goes beyond anything that McCartney ever indicated he was capable of." Robert Palmer was less enthusiastic in his review for The New York Times, and found the album "exquisitely crafted though lyrically flawed", as he thought McCartney's lyrics were often "clichéd or mawkish", but that the album "at its best, is as finely crafted as his work with the Beatles".

In March 1982, McCartney's duet with Stevie Wonder, "Ebony and Ivory", was released to considerable commercial success, reaching number one in many countries. Tug of War followed in April, and similarly became a worldwide number one. The follow-up single, "Take It Away", reached the top ten in the United States. The album restored McCartney's critical reputation after what was viewed as a lean period for him. Tug of War was nominated for the "Album of the Year" Grammy in 1983. Wingspan author Mark Lewisohn thought it was a better album than Band on the Run. In The Village Voice's annual Pazz & Jop critics poll, compiling the best albums of 1982, Tug of War placed at number 34.

== Track listing ==
All songs were written by Paul McCartney, except "What's That You're Doing?" co-written by Stevie Wonder.

Side one

1. "Tug of War" – 4:22
2. "Take It Away" – 4:14
3. "Somebody Who Cares" – 3:19
4. "What's That You're Doing?" (with Stevie Wonder) – 6:19
5. "Here Today" – 2:27

Side two

1. "Ballroom Dancing" – 4:07
2. "The Pound Is Sinking" – 2:54
3. "Wanderlust" – 3:49
4. "Get It" (with Carl Perkins) – 2:29
5. "Be What You See (Link)" – 0:34
6. "Dress Me Up as a Robber" – 2:41
7. "Ebony and Ivory" (with Stevie Wonder) – 3:46

== Reissues ==
The album was issued in the US on compact disc on 29 February 1984. In 1993, Tug of War was remastered and re-issued on CD as part of The Paul McCartney Collection series. There were no bonus tracks: "Rainclouds" and "I'll Give You a Ring", B-sides of "Ebony and Ivory" and "Take It Away", respectively, were omitted. In 2007, Tug of War was remastered and re-released on the iTunes Store adding a solo version of "Ebony and Ivory".

A further reissue of Tug of War was released on 2 October 2015, as part of the Paul McCartney Archive Collection. This edition included a remixed version of the album, along with the original mix, and a series of videos.

=== Archive Collection reissue ===
In 2015 the album was re-issued by Hear Music/Concord Music Group as part of the sixth set of releases, alongside Pipes of Peace, in the Paul McCartney Archive Collection. It was released in multiple formats:

- Standard edition 2-CD; remixed version of the original 12-track album on the first disc, plus 11 bonus tracks on a second disc.
- Deluxe edition 3-CD/1-DVD box set + 112-page essay book and 64-page scrapbook;
- Super deluxe CD/DVD 3-CD/1-DVD box set + 112-page essay book and 64-page scrapbook + limited edition acrylic slipcase
- Remastered vinyl The albums were also released in special gatefold vinyl editions (vinyl editions include a download card).

Disc 1 – Remixed album

Remixed version of the original 12-track album.

Disc 2 – Original album remastered (deluxe edition only)

The original 12-track album.

Bonus audio (disc 2 for standard version, disc 3 for deluxe edition)

All songs written by Paul McCartney, except "Rainclouds", co-written with Denny Laine.

1. "Stop, You Don't Know Where She Came From" (demo) – 1:44
2. "Wanderlust" (demo) – 1:46
3. "Ballroom Dancing" (demo) – 2:04
4. "Take It Away" (demo) – 5:37
5. "The Pound Is Sinking" (demo) – 2:35
6. "Something That Didn't Happen" (demo) – 2:17
7. "Ebony and Ivory" (demo) – 1:46
8. "Dress Me Up as a Robber/Robber Riff" (demo) – 3:42
9. "Ebony and Ivory" (solo version) – 3:50
10. "Rainclouds" (B-side to "Ebony and Ivory") – 3:13
11. "I'll Give You a Ring" (B-side to "Take it Away") – 3:09

Note: Tracks 1–8 previously unreleased.

Additional download tracks available via paulmccartney.com

1. "Take It Away" (single edit) – 4:05

Disc 4 – DVD

1. "Tug of War" music video (version 1)
2. "Tug of War" music video (version 2)
3. "Take It Away" music video
4. "Ebony and Ivory" music video
5. "Fly TIA" – Behind the Scenes on Take It Away

== Personnel ==
Track numbering refers to CD and digital releases of the album.

- Paul McCartney – arrangements, vocals, backing vocals (1–4, 6–9, 11, 12); synthesizers (1, 7, 9, 12); acoustic guitar (1–3, 7–9); electric guitar (1, 4, 6, 7); bass guitar (1, 2, 4, 6, 8, 9, 11, 12); drums (1, 4, 6, 7); acoustic piano (2, 6, 8, 12); Spanish guitar (3); guitars (5, 10–12), percussion (6, 9, 12); vocoder (10, 12)
- George Martin – arrangements, Fender Rhodes (2, 11)
- Stevie Wonder – vocals, backing vocals and synthesizers (4, 12); Fender Rhodes, drums and percussion (12)
- Denny Laine – electric guitar (1, 6, 11); guitar synthesizer (3); acoustic guitar (7); bass guitar (8); synthesizers (11)
- Eric Stewart – electric guitar (1); backing vocals (1–4, 6–8)
- Carl Perkins – electric guitar and vocals (9)
- Stanley Clarke – bass guitar (3, 7)
- Campbell Maloney – military snare drum (1)
- Steve Gadd – drums (2, 3); percussion (3)
- Ringo Starr – drums (2, 6, 8)
- Adrian Sheppard – drums and percussion (8)
- Dave Mattacks – drums and percussion (11)
- Kenneth Sillito – orchestra conductor (1)
- Adrian Brett – pan pipes (1)
- Andy Mackay – Lyricon (4)
- Jack Brymer – clarinet (6)
- Keith Harvey – cello (5)
- Ian Jewel – viola (5)
- Bernard Partridge – violin (5)
- Jack Rothstein – violin (5)
- Philip Jones Brass Ensemble – brass section (8)
- Linda McCartney – backing vocals (1–4, 6–8, 11)
- Peter Marshall – narrator (6)

Production

- George Martin – producer
- Geoff Emerick – engineer
- Jon Jacobs – assistant engineer
- Mike Stavrou – assistant engineer
- Alex Wharton – mastering
- Hipgnosis – cover coordination
- Sinc – cover coordination
- YES – creative direction, design
- Brian Clarke – cover painting
- Linda McCartney – photography

== Accolades ==
=== Grammy Awards ===
Year	Nominee / work	Award	Result
1983	Tug of War	Album of the Year	Nominated
1983	"Ebony and Ivory" (Duet with Stevie Wonder)	Song of the Year	Nominated
1983	"Ebony and Ivory" (Duet with Stevie Wonder)	Record of the Year	Nominated
1983	"Ebony and Ivory" (Duet with Stevie Wonder)	Best Pop Vocal Performance – Duo or Group	Nominated
1983	"What's That You're Doing?" (Duet with Stevie Wonder)	Best R&B Vocal Performance – Duo or Group	Nominated
2017	Tug of War (Remastered Deluxe Edition)	Best Boxed or Special Limited Edition Package	Nominated

=== American Music Awards ===
Year	Nominee / work	Award	Result
1983	Paul McCartney (performer)	Favorite Pop/Rock Male Artist	Nominated
1983	"Ebony and Ivory" (Duet with Stevie Wonder)	Favorite Pop/Rock Single	Nominated

=== Brit Awards ===
Year	Nominee / work	Award	Result
1983	Paul McCartney (performer)	Best British Male Artist	Won
1983	Paul McCartney (performer)	Sony Trophy for Technical Excellence	Won
1983	George Martin (producer)	Best British Producer	Nominated

== Charts ==
=== Weekly charts ===
Original album
Chart (1982)	Peak position
Australian Kent Music Report	2
Austrian Albums Chart	2
Belgium Albums Chart	3
Canadian RPM Albums Chart	1
Dutch Mega Albums Chart	1
French SNEP Albums Chart	2
Israeli Albums Chart	2
Italian Albums Chart	1
Japanese Oricon Weekly LP Chart ^{[B]}	1
New Zealand Albums Chart	4
Norwegian VG-lista Albums Chart	1
Spanish Albums Chart	2
Swedish Albums Chart	1
UK Albums Chart	1
US Billboard Top LPs & Tape ^{[A]}	1
West German Media Control Albums Chart	1

Reissue
Chart (2015)	Peak position
UK Albums Chart	49
German Albums (Offizielle Top 100)	25
US Billboard 200	56

=== Year-end charts ===
Chart (1982)	Position
Australian Albums Chart	7
Austrian Albums Chart	7
Canadian Albums Chart	14
French Albums Chart	12
Italian Albums Chart	13
Japanese Oricon Chart	37
UK Albums Chart	16
US Billboard Pop Albums	28

== Certifications and sales ==
Region	Certification	Certified units/sales
Australia (ARIA)	Platinum	50,000^{^}
Canada (Music Canada)	Gold	50,000^{^}
France (SNEP)	Gold	100,000^{*}
Japan (Oricon Charts)	—	237,000^{[C]}
Spain (Promusicae)	Gold	50,000^{^}
United Kingdom (BPI)	Gold	100,000^{^}
United States (RIAA)	Platinum	1,000,000^{^}
^{*} Sales figures based on certification alone.^{^} Shipments figures based on certification alone.

Notes

- A In the United States, Tug of War also entered the R&B chart, peaking at No. 11 there.
- B Until January 1987, Japanese albums chart had been separated into LP, CD, and cassette charts. Tug of War also entered the cassette chart, peaking at No. 12 and entering top 100 for 19 weeks. Tug of War also reached number 1 on the Music Labo albums chart in 1982.
- C Combined sales of LP, CD, and audio cassette.
