= Rinse the Raindrops =

Song by Paul McCartney

from the album Driving Rain
- Released: 11 November 2001
- Recorded: 19 February 2001
- Length: 10:08
- Label: Parlophone
- Songwriter: McCartney
- Producer: David Kahne

"Rinse the Raindrops" is a song by the English musician Paul McCartney, released as the penultimate track on his thirteenth studio album Driving Rain (2001). Being an extended jam, it is the longest running track on the album, running for barely over 10 minutes.

== Background ==
"Rinse the Raindrops" was written by McCartney while on a tour bus, yet he didn't have any instruments, so he wrote the lyrics then and later finished the song when he found a piano at the gig. It began as a poem and was later put to music over a 30 minute jam session, which David Kahne recalled as being "just one verse repeated over and over, but [McCartney] never sings it the same way twice,[ as t]he song goes through different cuts back and forth between different takes. It’s a very aggressive, pushy song where [McCartney] sings real low then real high—all over the place." The song was recorded on 19 February 2001. The song features some of McCartney's rawest vocals, as he had lost his voice while in India on holiday after an argument with a carpet salesman that apparently ripped him off.

== Release and reception ==
"Rinse the Raindrops" had mixed reception, with John Borack of Goldmine Magazine writing about Driving Rain that "Rinse the Raindrops" "might just be the worst thing he’s ever cooked up, right up (down?) there with "Kreen-Akrore," "Loup (1st Indian on the Moon)," and "Check My Machine."" in a ranking of Paul McCartney's 5 worst albums. Drowned in Sound critic James Westfox called it a "scorching closer". Carla Hay called it in Billboard magazine "an epic number that clocks in at more than 10 minutes and radically changes musical direction within that span." Greg Kot wrote in Rolling Stone magazine that "[On ]the ten-minute rave-up "Rinse the Raindrops," McCartney's bass does the steering. Four-string melodies rise up as a counterpoint to his still-pliant vocals, and the never-ending McCartney groove, well, it isn't silly at all." Author John Blaney wrote that "Like 'Why Don't We Do It In The Road?', 'Rinse The Raindrops' is a raucous blues-based monolith that reveals its author’s delight in jamming and his pleasure in exchanging ideas with other musicians." In 2005, a remix of "Rinse the Raindrops" by the electronic music duo Twin Freaks (which features Paul McCartney) was released from the duo's only self titled album, and as a promotional single.

== Personnel ==
According to the Paul McCartney Project:

- Paul McCartney – bass, executive producer, Spanish guitar, vocals
- Rusty Anderson – electric guitar
- Abe Laboriel Jr. – accordion, drums
- Gabe Dixon – electric piano, Hammond organ, piano
- David Kahne – mixing engineer, producer
- Mark Dearnley – mixing engineer, recording engineer
- Jaime Sickora – assistant engineer
- Kevin Mills – second assistant engineer
