= Anthony Roland =

British producer of films about art

- Born: 1936; London
- Occupation: Film producer
- Parents: Dr. Henry Roland (father); Joyce Coefi (mother)

Anthony Montagu Roland is a British producer of films about art. Roland is best known for producing the series of films about art comprising the Roland Collection of Films and Videos on Art, and for his concept of the open air presentation of these films.

== Early career ==
Anthony Roland was born in London in 1936. His parents were Dr. Henry Roland (1907-1993) and Joyce Coe. His father was one of the founders of art dealers Roland, Browse and Delbanco at Cork Street in London. He started his career as a collector and dealer in Old Master and modern paintings. He lived in Paris for 12 years before returning to England.

== Roland Collection ==
The Roland Collection of films and documentaries about art and modern literature is a selection of the work of 230 film producers from 25 countries. More than 4,000 museums, art galleries and other types of institution from 82 countries have shown films from this collection. The resource guide shows that over 600 films are available, and Roland has himself produced himself 16 of these. The Roland Collection was one of the official cultural events at the Mexico Olympics in 1968.

== Art films in London ==
Anthony Roland started collecting films on art when he was 24. He sponsored his own lecture tour of the US, where he found institutions which had the budgets to realise his ideas. He insisted on high quality of presentation and films being shown together rather than as being seen as 'shorts' alongside other films.

In November 1964 Roland presented his own film about the drawings of Eugène Delacroix at the Academy Cinema in London, alongside a screening of Alain Jessua's film La Vie à l'envers. In the summer of 1966 at the same cinema, in the 40-minute film Rembrandt's Christ he used the drawings of Rembrandt to illustrate an account of the Gospel story.

== Art film centre ==
In October 1969 Roland opened the 400-seater Art Film Centre, at 6 Leicester Place off Leicester Square in London, where two cinemas showed a programme of over 60 of his best films on art. Later that year in the Centre he presented Kaleidoscope, a programme of art films for children.

== Art Hopping ==
Anthony Roland's latest project is titled Art Hopping. Developed in partnership with ICOM for International Museum Day from 12 May to 31 May 2013, two sets of free films from the Roland Collection are freely available. Typically for museums to provide for their visitors, the user points a smartphone at one of the QR codes on the poster to obtain immediate showing of a film. The intention is to provide this educational service to museums, universities and schools.

== Publications ==
- Anthony Roland. Videos on Art - a resource guide to films and videos available worldwide from the Roland Collection. (1996) Peasmarsh, East Sussex, England and Ho-Ho-Kus, New Jersey, US. Available in the following editions
  - RC1 Videos on Art ISBN 0 9525881 0 2
  - RC2 - - airmail edition ISBN 0 9525881 1 0
  - RC3 - - edition with seven and a half hours of video sequences from most titles ISBN 0 9525881 2 9
  - RC4 - - with French translation on 3.5" 1.44mb floppy disc ISBN 0 9525881 3 7
  - RC5 - - airmail edition with French translation on 3.5" 1.44mb floppy disc ISBN 0 9525881 4 5
  - RC6 - - with French translation on 3.5" 1.44mb floppy disc and with seven and a half hours of video sequences from most titles ISBN 0 9525881 5 3
