= Temporary Secretary =

Single by Paul McCartney

from the album McCartney II
- B-side: "Secret Friend"
- Released: 19 September 1980
- Recorded: June–July 1979
- Studio: Home Studio, Peasmarsh; Spirit of Ranachan, Campbeltown
- Genre: Synth-pop; electropop; new wave; avant-garde; electronica
- Length: 3:13
- Label: Parlophone; EMI
- Songwriter: Paul McCartney
- Producer: Paul McCartney

Paul McCartney singles chronology
| "Waterfalls" (1980) | "Temporary Secretary" (1980) | "Ebony and Ivory" (1982) |

McCartney II track listing
- 11 tracks Side one: 1. "Coming Up"; 2. "Temporary Secretary"; 3. "On the Way"; 4. "Waterfalls"; 5. "Nobody Knows"; Side two: 6. "Front Parlour"; 7. "Summer's Day Song"; 8. "Frozen Jap"; 9. "Bogey Music"; 10. "Darkroom"; 11. "One of These Days"

Back cover

"Temporary Secretary" is a song by the English musician Paul McCartney, released on 19 September 1980 as the third single from his third solo studio album McCartney II (1980). Dominated by a dissonant sequenced synthesiser line, NME later described the song as "wonky electropop that didn't sound so much ahead of its time as out of it altogether." While initially met with highly negative critical reception, it has since become a cult classic and favorite among McCartney fans.

== Background ==
It's like a disposable secretary, and it struck me as being funny. The song is written from the point of view of a fellow who just wants a disposable secretary, and he's writing to a bureau to try and get one. I just like the idea. I just thought it was funny, you know, asking for a temporary secretary rather than a secretary. ... That sound on the track, which is like a space typewriter, is a sequence machine. I used that to give me a tempo and, again, I just made the song up as I went along. It was a little influenced by Ian Dury.

— Paul McCartney

McCartney later said that he had had temporary secretaries, and that there was a real Mr. Marks.

After I left Apple I still had business stuff coming up, so in trying to figure out how I could cope with that there were a couple of times I just grabbed someone to just put my letters in order and help. But that track isn't about a specific person. What it's about is, there was a guy called Alfred Marks, he had the Alfred Marks Bureau—he had the same name as a comedian on the radio when I was growing up. So it was just the funny paradox of seeing adverts for the Alfred Marks Bureau, the idea of some comedian having a bureau was just funny. It said 'Temporary Secretary', and I thought, that's a kind of funky thought. Then there was the secretary thing: take a letter Miss Smith, sit on my lap... all that kind of stuff.

— Paul McCartney, The Quietus, 2011

== Release ==
"Temporary Secretary" was released as a third single from the album only in a form of 12" single, along with the ten-minute "Secret Friend" as its B-side, but it was limited to 25,000 copies and therefore failed to chart. A 7" single exists only as a demo for radio stations. It exemplifies both the whimsical nature of the album and McCartney's use of synthesizers and other electronics in the creation of the album. McCartney said the song was an "experiment."

== Live performances ==
McCartney performed "Temporary Secretary" live for the first time 35 years after its release: on May 23, 2015, at the O2 Arena in London. He performed it live at some dates during the 2015 legs of his Out There tour and at some dates during his 2016–2017 One on One tour.

== Reception ==
Decades after its release, music website AllMusic said of the album, McCartney II:

In retrospect, the record is muddled and confused, nowhere more so than on the frazzled sequencing of "Temporary Secretary," where McCartney spits out ridiculous lyrics with a self-consciously atonal melody over gurgling synths. Things rarely get worse than that....

In contrast, music website PopMatters said, in reviewing the 2011 reissue of McCartney II:

"Temporary Secretary" is a manic, futuristic laser blast with an actual melody simmering underneath. It would be pointless to compare it to anything McCartney had ever done before, and would be equally so to compare it to anyone else as it couldn't possibly be anyone else. More than any other song on either eponymous album, "Temporary Secretary" illustrates the complex nature of Paul McCartney's musical output ...

Beatles biographers Roy Carr and Tony Tyler described the song as built from an initial, repetitive synthesizer theme, with more substantial instrumental portions added over time, and finally an insubstantial vocal. They said the song was done without commitment and that it "grows irritating towards the end."

In 2013, Rolling Stone rated "Temporary Secretary" as McCartney's 36th greatest post-Beatles song, calling it a "cult favorite" and an "oddly catchy electro-pop nugget, about a slightly creepy-sounding guy looking to hire a temp." In 2014, "Temporary Secretary" was ranked as the 167th greatest song of all time by NME.

== Chart history ==
| Chart (1980) | Peak position |
|---|---|
| Luxembourg (Radio Luxembourg) | 13 |

== Track listing ==
12" single (12 R 6039)

1. "Temporary Secretary" – 3:13
2. "Secret Friend" – 10:30

== Personnel ==
"Temporary Secretary"

- Paul McCartney – vocals, acoustic guitar, bass, keyboards, drums, synthesizer, sequencer

"Secret Friend"

- Paul McCartney – vocals, bass, synthesizers, electric guitar, keyboards, drums, shaker, percussion
