= McCartney II =

1980 solo studio album by Paul McCartney

Studio album by Paul McCartney
- Released: 16 May 1980
- Recorded: June–August 1979
- Studios: Lower Gate Farm (Peasmarsh, East Sussex); Spirit of Ranachan (Campbeltown)
- Genres: Synth-pop; new wave; electronica; experimental rock
- Length: 37:59
- Labels: Parlophone (UK); Columbia (US)
- Producer: Paul McCartney

Paul McCartney chronology
Back to the Egg (1979)	McCartney II (1980)	The McCartney Interview (1980)

Paul McCartney studio album chronology
Thrillington (1977)	McCartney II (1980)	Tug of War (1982)

Singles from McCartney II
- 1. "Coming Up" Released: 11 April 1980; 2. "Waterfalls" Released: 13 June 1980; 3. "Temporary Secretary" Released: 19 September 1980

McCartney II is the third solo studio album by the English musician Paul McCartney, released on 16 May 1980. McCartney envisioned it as an experiment and did not intend to release it commercially, following his disillusionment with his band Wings. He recorded it in the summer of 1979 at his home studio in Peasmarsh and Campbeltown. Like his debut solo studio album, McCartney (1970), he produced, engineered and performed all the instruments himself; Linda McCartney provided additional vocals. (Note: Sources differ on whether Linda provided backing vocals. The authors Allan Kozinn and Adrian Sinclair state that Paul used vari-speed effects to make the vocals sound male and female, but "all the voices are Paul's". John Blaney also lists Paul as the only musician on the album, while Howard Elson says he "sang all the vocal tracks and harmony". However, Vincent Benitez Jr. states that Linda sang backing vocals on two tracks, one of which was "Bogey Music" according to Luca Perasi; Perasi is unsure if Linda sang on "Coming Up". In a 1980 interview, when asked if Linda contributed to McCartney II, Paul said "she sang a couple of things that were too high for me to sing like the high voice on 'Coming Up'." Linda is listed in the 1980 liner notes and on McCartney's website as providing "additional vocals".) Originally intended to be a double album, McCartney trimmed it to a single album for commercial reasons. Its outtakes included the 1979 non-album single "Wonderful Christmastime" and the B-sides "Check My Machine" and "Secret Friend".

The album was a significant departure for McCartney, relying heavily on synthesisers and studio experimentation, while its musical style embraces new wave and elements of electronica and synth-pop. McCartney's vocals were tinkered with using vari-speed effects. Three of its songs were released as singles: "Coming Up", a UK number 2 and US number 1, "Waterfalls", a UK top 10, and "Temporary Secretary"; the first two were accompanied by music videos.

Critics initially gave McCartney II largely unfavourable reviews, being dismissed as self-indulgent and disappointing. However, retrospective reception has been more positive and the album has become a cult favourite. Some critics credit it as ahead of its time and a forerunner to the sound of 1980s pop. In 2011, an expanded edition of McCartney II was issued with over a dozen bonus tracks. In 2020, the album was succeeded by McCartney III. In 2022, the trilogy was reissued in the McCartney I II III box set.

== Background and recording ==
Following the commercial failure of the Wings' album Back to the Egg (1979), Paul McCartney retreated to his newly purchased Lower Gate Farm in Peasmarsh, East Sussex, where he decided to experiment with new recordings. Similar to his first solo album McCartney (1970). The recordings were initially intended as experiments and not planned for commercial release. At the time, McCartney stated: "I wasn't trying to do an album. It was just for my own satisfaction. But in the end, I got a few tracks, and I played it to a couple people, and they said, 'Oh, I see, that's your next album.' So, then I got a bit serious on it, trying to make it into an album." Additionally, he had begun to feel disillusioned with Wings, so aimed to create music different than Wings' output.

McCartney II was recorded over six weeks in the summer of 1979, beginning in June at Lower Gate Farm and moving to the Spirit of Ranachan Studio in Campbeltown through July and August. McCartney himself produced and engineered, only receiving help from his technician Eddie Klein, who supplied him with a Studer A80 16-track machine and various microphones, stands, a 16-track mixer and recording tape.

Similar to his recording process for McCartney, McCartney began by recording drum tracks first, which he then overdubbed instruments and vocals onto. In a 1980 interview, he explained that he enjoyed the freedom the sessions gave him, comparing it to his poor experience recording Back to the Egg with Wings. McCartney performed every instrument himself, which included synthesisers, keyboards, bass guitar, acoustic and electric guitars, electric piano, drums and percussion. He utilised unconventional methods to achieve his desired sounds, such as using a kitchen or bathroom as an echo chamber to achieve an "echo snare". For his vocals, he applied vari-speed effects to change his pitch; Linda McCartney may have provided additional vocals. While most songs originated from experiments, "One of These Days" was inspired by a Hare Krishna devotee visiting McCartney in the studio.

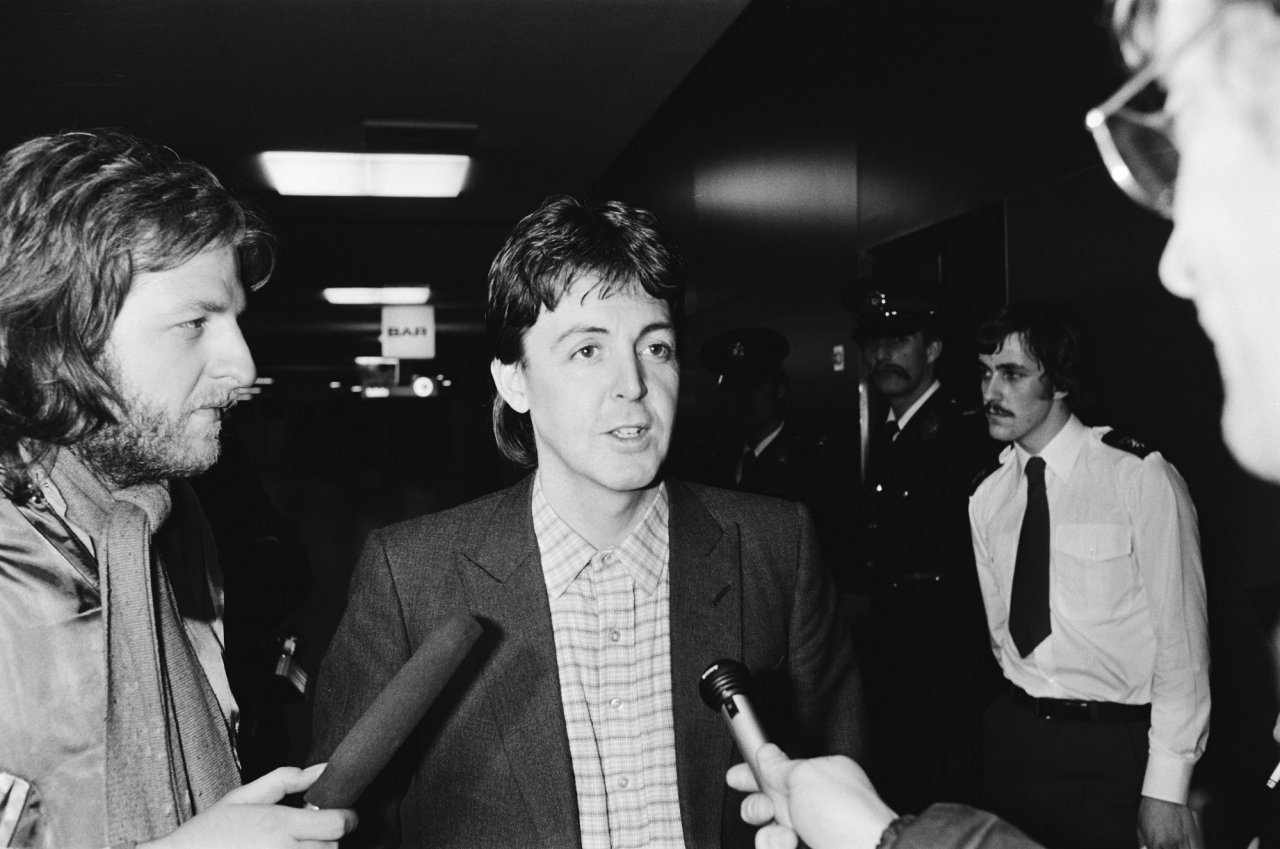
McCartney being interviewed at Amsterdam's Schiphol Airport, January 1980

By September 1979, McCartney decided to release the tracks as his second solo album. Mixing occurred at Abbey Road Studios in London from late September to mid-October, with Klein engineering. With 19 total tracks recorded, he originally planned for McCartney II to be a double album but trimmed it down to a single album for commercial reasons. (Note: The original double LP tracklist, taken from an acetate, ran as follows: Side one: "Front Parlour", "Frozen Jap", "All You Horseriders", "Blue Sway" Side two: "Temporary Secretary", "On the Way", "Mr. H. Atom", "Summer's Day Song", "You Know I'll Get You Baby", "Bogey Wobble" Side three: "Darkroom", "One of These Days", "Secret Fried", "Bogey Music" Side four: "Check My Machine", "Waterfalls", "Nobody Knows", "Coming Up" In 1989, this tracklist was bootlegged under the title The Lost McCartney Album.) Eleven songs appeared on the original album. Outtakes included "Wonderful Christmastime", released as a single in November 1979; "Check My Machine" and "Secret Friend", both released as single B-sides; "Bogey Wobble", "Mr. H Atom", "You Know I'll Get You Baby", "All You Horse Riders" and "Blue Sway", all of which were shelved until they were released on the deluxe edition of McCartney II in 2011.

Following McCartney II's completion, McCartney and Wings regrouped for a UK tour from November to December 1979. Plans for a world tour were cancelled in early 1980 when McCartney was arrested after being caught in possession of 219 grams of marijuana in Tokyo, Japan, on 16 January. McCartney's arrest generated a wave of publicity in tabloids and on television. After a ten-day stay in jail, he returned home to his Scottish farm. Following his arrest, he put Wings on hold while he contemplated his future.

== Music and lyrics ==
Featuring arrangements that are heavy on synthesisers, McCartney II has been said to represent McCartney's "acceptance of new wave", and was described by Pete Paphides of The Times as "airless proto-electronica". The album is often experimental, with most of its songs described by Pitchfork's Joe Tangari as strange "eccentric synth-pop". Although McCartney denied any direct influences on the album, he admired the "eccentricity" and "not-mainstream attitude" of Talking Heads' David Byrne. McCartney was also inspired by experimental composers John Cage, Cornelius Cardew and Luciano Berio; McCartney explained: "I went to their concerts in London because I had plenty of time on my hands so it was the kind of thing I would go and see. Again, just to see what it was about, not necessarily because I was a massive fan. It was more like: what is a prepared piano? Oh, that's what it is. You know, funky stuff like that."

According to Stephen Dalton of The Quietus, parts of the album are reminiscent of krautrock and "the whole post-punk disco boom", and he described most of the album as "an alluringly weird mash-up of trip-hop, Krautrock and synth-pop." McCartney said that, "rather than me emulating anyone, it was more a question of me seeing what I could do with it. And again, not necessarily thinking I was making an album, just to have some time to experiment. These days I would say that with the Fireman project. So I've always been into that – if you go from 'Tomorrow Never Knows' through McCartney I, McCartney II, the Fireman..." Many of the most synthesised tracks are instrumentals which have been described as ambient; journalist Stephen Thomas Erlewine compared them "to a sprightly variation" of the instrumentals from the second side of Low (1977) by David Bowie, albeit with a warmer, less menacing sound.

=== Songs ===
"Coming Up" is an experimental pop song. McCartney ran his vocals through a vari-speed machine, resulting in what Luca Perasi calls a "wound-up" vocal. In his book The Lyrics: 1956 to the Present (2021), Paul McCartney described it as "a very positive song" that reflects his "very positive attitude". "Temporary Secretary" is an electronic piece built on a sequenced synthesiser loop, which McCartney likened to the sound of a "space typewriter". The lyrics concern an employer writing a letter to a hiring agency requesting a temporary secretary. Music professor Vincent P. Benitez Jr. likened the lyrics to McCartney's Beatles song "Paperback Writer" (1966). McCartney described the song as "tongue-in-cheek" and compared its style to that of Ian Dury.

"On the Way" is a 12-bar blues song with echoed vocals and slow guitar parts. It began as a basic instrumental track before McCartney watched a BBC special on American blues music called The Devil's Music (1979). Its lyrics concern love and the hardships it comes with. "Waterfalls" was the only song written before the McCartney II sessions began. Perasi referred to it as "a dreamy song with an ethereal atmosphere". It features electric piano and an orchestra created using synthesisers. Inspired by images in tourist catalogues, the song pleads with listeners to stay safe and away from, in McCartney's words, "doing all the dangerous stuff, 'cause I need you." "Nobody Knows" was inspired by the same BBC special that inspired "On the Way". Featuring numerous electric guitar parts, "Nobody Knows" has a country and western feel. Benitez Jr. says that the lyrics have no meaning and simply serve the music.

"Front Parlour" was the first track recorded for the album and was titled after the room it was recorded in. It is an instrumental built on synthesisers over a drum pattern. According to McCartney, "Summer's Day Song" originated after hearing a classical song, attempting to recreate it using synthesisers. Perasi believes he may have been referring to Brian Eno's "Spider and I" (1977), as he says both songs have a similar tone and "lethargic melody". The lyrics offer hope to a listener who may be struggling in life. The instrumental "Frozen Jap" came about as McCartney was experimenting with synthesisers and stumbled upon, in his words, an "Oriental"-sounding melody. The title was meant to be a placeholder as McCartney found earlier song names such as "Crystalline Icicles Overhang the Little Cabin By the Ice-Capped Mount Fuji" and "Snow Scene in the Orient" clumsy. On Japanese copies of the album, the title was changed to "Frozen Japanese" because McCartney was unaware that "jap" was viewed as a racial slur. According to music journalist Ian Peel, "Front Parlour" and "Frozen Jap" were "completely avant-garde compared to almost anything McCartney's rock and roll contemporaries were recording at the time."

"Bogey Music" was inspired by the children's book Fungus the Bogeyman (1977). It is a 12-bar boogie containing drums, a rhythm box, synthesisers and electric guitar lines, with McCartney doing vocal impersonations of Elvis Presley. Linda McCartney provided a small vocal part. According to Perasi, "Darkroom" is "a sort of experimental blues built on a drum and bass groove". Paul McCartney said it could be about any type of dimly lit room: a darkroom for photography and film, a dark room for sex, or a literal dark room. "One of These Days" is an acoustic ballad that uses heavy reverb. Authors Allan Kozinn and Adrian Sinclair interpreted the lyrics as reflecting an aspiration for simplicity, while Benitez Jr. argued that they represent McCartney advocating for himself to remove the things that prevent him from being happy and self-fulfilled.

== Release and promotion ==
McCartney II was released in the UK on 16 May and in the US on 22 May 1980. The album cover is a grainy, mug shot-style image of Paul photographed by Linda during a Wings photoshoot in the summer of 1979. To promote the album, Paul conducted various interviews with British journalists and music critics. These included one with Tim Rice, which was filmed in May 1980 for the Meet Paul McCartney television special and aired by ITV in August and October; one with Nicky Horne for the programme Thames At Six; one with Paul Gambaccini for Rolling Stone magazine, published in July; and one with Vic Garbarini, which appeared as a limited-edition LP titled The McCartney Interview. The LP was released on 4 December 1980 in the US and on 23 February 1981 in the UK, where it charted at number 34 and 158, respectively.

McCartney II performed well commercially. The album debuted in the UK at number one on the UK Albums Chart, becoming McCartney's first number-one there since Venus and Mars (1975); it was certified gold by the British Phonographic Industry (BPI) for selling 100,000 copies. EMI reported that the album was on track to equal the sales of Band on the Run (1973). In the US, initial sales were strong and the album reached number three in its second week on the Billboard Top LPs & Tapes album chart, where it remained for five weeks. The album quickly dropped down the charts and was off the Billboard chart after 19 weeks, McCartney's shortest run since Wild Life (1971). It was one of his lowest-selling albums in the US up to that point. Nevertheless, it was certified gold by the Recording Industry Association of America (RIAA). Elsewhere, McCartney II reached number 2 in France, number 5 in New Zealand, Norway and Sweden, number 6 in Australia, number 7 in Spain and number 8 in Japan.

=== Singles ===
"Coming Up" was released as the lead single on 11 April 1980, with a live version of the song by Wings, recorded in Glasgow on 17 December 1979, as the B-side. Columbia Records chose the live version as the A-side, believing McCartney's vocal stylings were more recognisable; the single was packaged in copies of McCartney II in the US. The single was a major success, reaching number 2 in the UK and number 1 in the US, where it was certified gold by the RIAA. Elsewhere, "Coming Up" reached number 1 in Canada and number 2 in Australia. The song was accompanied by a music video directed by Keith MacMillan. In it, Paul (in ten different roles) and Linda (as two backup singers) perform as "the Plastic Macs". Paul imitates several musicians, including Hank Marvin of the Shadows, Ron Mael of Sparks, and a Beatle-era version of himself.

"Waterfalls" was released as the album's second single on 13 June 1980, with "Check My Machine" as the B-side". The song reached number 9 in the UK but failed to chart on US Billboard Hot 100, appearing only on the "bubbling under" the Billboard Hot 100 at number 106 for one week. A music video was made, which adapted the song's lyrics; it was shot on a set in Wandsworth Common and features a polar bear borrowed from Chipperfield's Circus. "Temporary Secretary" was released in September 1980 as a 12" single in Britain, limited to 25,000 copies; it sold out within 16 hours. Jeff Cummins of Hipgnosis created the single's artwork.

== Critical reception ==
Professional ratings
Contemporary reviews
Review scores
Source	Rating
Robert Christgau	C
Record Mirror	3/5 stars
Smash Hits	5/10
Sounds	4/5 stars

The critical reception to McCartney II was mostly negative. Many critics found the album slight, with its experimental, synth-based compositions and its handful of instrumentals. Record World magazine described it as "arguably the least well-received solo work of any Beatle". Some described it as self-indulgent. Marshall Fine, in the San Bernardino County Sun, called McCartney II a "terrible" album that "sets new standards for both tedium and self-indulgence". He believed it was worse than Ringo Starr and George Harrison's worst projects. Writing for Rolling Stone, Stephen Holden said that the album was "passable" as a "novelty", ultimately arguing that it stands as "an album of aural doodles designed for the amusement of very young children".

In the Los Angeles Times, Robert Hilburn called the album an embarrassment that has less impact than the original McCartney. Still, he recommended fans not to give up on McCartney: "Remember: Band on the Run followed Wild Life." Billboard was mixed, finding McCartney II a record of "pop insignificance" like Back to the Egg and London Town (1978). The reviewer found the lyrics weak, the melodies impenetrable and most of the songs "cute throwaways". In a very negative review for NME, Danny Baker said: "McCartney II isn't worth the plastic it's printed on. Neither is Paul, but he'll go on doodling and fooling his public because they're too frightened to ditch him and his past and he's too rich to be stopped."

In a more positive review, Rosalind Russell of Record Mirror found greater appreciation for the record's "low key approach" after a second listen. She enjoyed some of the songs' "comfortable qualit[ies]", naming "Waterfalls". She summarised by saying: "If your expectations are formulated from the sleeve, you'll find it's sailing under false colours." Sounds magazine's Phil Sutcliffe, who disliked most of McCartney's work with Wings, believed McCartney II was an artistic improvement and succeeded because McCartney worked entirely alone. He ultimately believed he could become better by embracing deeper emotional inspection in future works. Both Russell and Sutcliffe disliked the two instrumentals, with the former describing them as experimental throwaways.

== Retrospective reviews and legacy ==
Professional ratings
Retrospective reviews
Review scores
Source	Rating
AllMusic	4/5 stars
The Encyclopedia of Popular Music	3/5 stars
The Essential Rock Discography	5/10
MusicHound	3/5 stars
Pitchfork	7.2/10
Q	2/5 stars
Record Collector	4/5 stars
The Rolling Stone Album Guide	2/5 stars

Retrospective reviews have rated the album more highly, and it has become a cult favourite. Some writers credit it as ahead of its time and a forerunner to the sound of 1980s pop. Although Pitchfork's Joe Tangari questioned the album's true impact on 1980s synth-pop, "its diffuse and slightly wobbly atmosphere certainly aligns with a great deal of recent music made on synths and drum machines". Ash Akhtar of The Quietus argued that while McCartney and McCartney II could be considered self-indulgent, they represented points in time where McCartney had to find himself.

In a more mixed assessment, senior AllMusic editor Stephen Thomas Erlewine believed that the album retrospectively sounds "muddled", "confused" and "forced", with its "lack of memorable melodies... accentuated by the stiff electronics [being] not innovative at the time and are even more awkward in the present". Nevertheless, Erlewine appreciated McCartney's adventurousness after years of "formulaic pop" in Wings. John Blaney wrote that with McCartney II, McCartney's attempts at the avant-garde suffered from his knowledge of melody, resulting in a record that "sits uncomfortably between the unconventional and the commonplace". The biographer Howard Sounes believed that McCartney II was an improvement over recent Wings releases and a "generally strong" record with "less filler". Chip Madinger and Mark Easter described the album as "wildly inconsistent".

In 2003, Mojo placed the album at number 26 on their list of the "Top 50 Eccentric Albums". In 2014, NME included the album on their list of "101 Albums to Hear Before You Die", whose list entries were chosen by different musicians; McCartney II was picked by Austin Williams of Swim Deep. In 2018, Pitchfork ranked it at number 186 in their list of "The 200 Best Albums of the 1980s". They called it a "strange, guileless wisp of a synth-pop record" and wrote that although "[o]riginally derided as a novelty, McCartney II is now remarkable in its prescience of the lo-fi and bedroom pop movements."

=== Influence ===
McCartney II was described as an influence on Hot Chip's album Made in the Dark (2008), especially with songs like "Wrestlers", "Bendable Poseable", "Whistle for Will" and "We're Looking for a Lot of Love". "Now There Is Nothing" from the band's later album In Our Heads (2012) has been described as a homage to McCartney II, with their guitarist Al Doyle explaining the song has "quite deliberately quirky time signature changes and key changes and these sort of very wandering harmonies—very typical of that period and McCartney productions." Alexis Taylor of the group has described McCartney II as one of his favourite albums of all time. The album has also been championed by multiple other musicians such as disc jockey Erol Alkan, Chris Carter of Throbbing Gristle, Gruff Rhys of Super Furry Animals and Ty Bulmer of New Young Pony Club.

== Track listing ==
All songs are written by Paul McCartney.

Side one

1. "Coming Up" – 3:53
2. "Temporary Secretary" – 3:14
3. "On the Way" – 3:38
4. "Waterfalls" – 4:43
5. "Nobody Knows" – 2:52

Side two

1. "Front Parlour" – 3:32
2. "Summer's Day Song" – 3:25
3. "Frozen Jap" – 3:40
4. "Bogey Music" – 3:27
5. "Darkroom" – 2:20
6. "One of These Days" – 3:35

Additional tracks on the 1993 CD reissue

12. "Check My Machine" – 5:50
13. "Secret Friend" – 10:31
14. "Goodnight Tonight" – 4:15

== Reissues ==
McCartney II was first issued on CD in the UK on 5 October 1987, along with the Wings albums Wild Life and Red Rose Speedway; this issue added the B-sides "Check My Machine" and "Secret Friend" as bonus tracks. In 1993, McCartney II was remastered and reissued on CD as part of The Paul McCartney Collection series with Wings' 1979 hit "Goodnight Tonight" added as a third bonus track. Madinger and Easter criticised this remaster for adding unnecessary noise reduction and quicker fadeouts.

On 13 June 2011, Hear Music/Concord Music Group reissued the album as part of the second set of releases, alongside McCartney, as part of the Paul McCartney Archive Collection. The release included the original album, bonus tracks, a 128-page book containing the album's history and previously unpublished photographs by Linda McCartney, and a DVD containing music videos and unreleased footage. With this reissue, McCartney II re-entered the UK charts at number 108.

McCartney and McCartney II were followed by McCartney III in 2020, which McCartney recorded in isolation during the COVID-19 pandemic. All three albums were reissued on 5 August 2022 in a box set entitled McCartney I II III, consisting of three LPs or three CDs.

== Personnel ==
According to the liner notes:

- Paul McCartney – all vocals and instrumentation, producer, engineer, mixing
- Linda McCartney – additional vocals
- Eddie Klein – mixing assistant

== Charts and certifications ==
=== Weekly charts ===
Original release

1980 weekly chart performance for McCartney II
Chart (1980)	Peak position
Australia (Kent Music Report)	6
Austrian Albums (Ö3 Austria Top 40)	4
Canadian Albums (RPM)	5
Dutch Mega Albums (MegaCharts)	20
West German Albums (Media Control)	19
Japanese LPs (Oricon)^{[A]}	8
New Zealand Albums (RIANZ)	5
Norwegian Albums (VG-lista)	5
Spanish Albums (Promusicae)	7
Swedish Albums (Sverigetopplistan)	5
UK Albums	1
US Billboard 200	3

2023–2025 weekly chart performance for McCartney II
Chart (2023–2025)	Peak position
German Albums (Offizielle Top 100)	18
German Pop Albums (Offizielle Top 100)	11
US Billboard 200	91

Reissue

Weekly chart performance for McCartney II reissue
Chart (2011)	Peak position
French Albums (SNEP)	158
Japanese Albums (Oricon)	32
Spanish Albums	85
UK Albums	108
US Billboard 200	82
US Top Pop Catalog Albums	10

=== Year-end charts ===
Year-end chart performance for McCartney II
Chart (1980)	Position
Australian Albums (Kent Music Report)	32
Canadian Albums (RPM)	20
Japanese Albums (Oricon)	95
UK Albums	36

=== Certifications and sales ===
Certifications and sales for McCartney II
Region	Certification	Certified units/sales
Australia (ARIA)	Platinum	50,000^{^}
Japan (Oricon Charts)	—	80,000
United Kingdom (BPI)	Gold	100,000^{^}
United States (RIAA)	Gold	500,000^{^}
^{^} Shipments figures based on certification alone.

Notes

- A Until January 1987, the Japanese album chart had been separated into LP, CD and cassette charts. McCartney II also entered the cassette chart, peaking at number 13.
