= Waterfalls (Paul McCartney song) =

Single by Paul McCartney

from the album McCartney II
- B-side: "Check My Machine"
- Released: 13 June 1980
- Recorded: June–July 1979
- Studio: Home Studio, Peasmarsh; Spirit of Ranachan, Campbeltown
- Genre: Soft rock
- Length: 4:43 (Album Version); 3:20 (DJ Edit)
- Label: Parlophone/EMI (UK); Columbia (US)
- Songwriter: Paul McCartney
- Producer: Paul McCartney

Paul McCartney singles chronology
"Coming Up" (1980)	"Waterfalls" (1980)	"Temporary Secretary" (1980)

McCartney II track listing
- 11 tracks Side one: 1. "Coming Up"; 2. "Temporary Secretary"; 3. "On the Way"; 4. "Waterfalls"; 5. "Nobody Knows"; Side two: 6. "Front Parlour"; 7. "Summer's Day Song"; 8. "Frozen Jap"; 9. "Bogey Music"; 10. "Darkroom"; 11. "One of These Days"

Music video
- "Waterfalls" on YouTube

"Waterfalls" is a song by the English musician Paul McCartney from his third solo studio album, McCartney II. The song has a minimalist sound, with McCartney only playing a Fender Rhodes electric piano and a synthesizer and singing, and a short solo performed on acoustic guitar.

"Waterfalls" was released as a single with "Check My Machine" as its B-Side and reached chart position No. 9 in the UK and No. 4 in Ireland. In the US, however, it was his first single ever to miss the Billboard Hot 100 chart, only reaching No. 106 despite being the follow-up to the No. 1 hit "Coming Up". In 2013, Rolling Stone rated it the No. 25 all-time Paul McCartney post-Beatles song, describing how it contrasted with Wings' prior single.

== Background ==
Billboard described "Waterfalls" as having "a subtle oriental flavour" and "appropriately sparse" instrumentation, and described McCartney's vocal performance as "inimitable" and "creamy." Cashbox called it a "whimsical ballad," stating that it has an "almost dirge-like melody." Record World said that "Stately keyboards surround [McCartney's] boyish falsetto for pop-A/C appeal."

When questioned on singles he wished were more successful, McCartney stated, "There's quite a few, actually. ... 'Waterfalls', I think is nice." He also commented that TLC's single "Waterfalls" carries elements of his song. Despite an initial dissatisfaction with the lyrics, McCartney would later say that, "it became one of my favourite songs at the time".

McCartney also said of his song:

Waterfalls’ is basically saying don’t go doing a load of dangerous stuff, ’cause I need you. And that’s a kind of a more mature thought for me than I would have been able to have done 20 years ago, ’cause I just didn’t realize that it’s not all gonna be here forever. That’s the kind of thing you realize when you pass 30.

== Charts ==
Chart (1980)	Peak position
Australia (ARIA)	31
Luxembourg (Radio Luxembourg)	4
Ireland	4
New Zealand (Recorded Music NZ)	15
Norway (VG-lista)	9
UK Singles (Official Charts)	9
West Germany (GfK)	55

== Personnel ==
"Waterfalls"

- Paul McCartney – vocals, Fender rhodes, synthesizer, acoustic guitar solo

"Check My Machine"

- Paul McCartney - vocals, banjo, bass, electric guitar, keyboards, synthesizer, drums, shaker, percussion

== Music video ==
A music video was produced, directed by Keef who was best known for directing several music videos for Kate Bush, most notably "Wuthering Heights". Partially filmed in a studio and partially in Wandsworth Common, the video features McCartney writing and singing the song in a cottage, in front of sprinklers and projected images of a polar bear, and ridding on a carousel. After the song concludes, McCartney turns out the lights in the cottage before falling on a cat in the darkness offscreen.

== Other versions ==
Sloan recorded a more uptempo version of the song on the McCartney tribute album Listen to What the Man Said.
