= So Bad (Paul McCartney song) =

Single by Paul McCartney

from the album Pipes of Peace
- B-side: "Pipes of Peace"
- Released: 5 December 1983
- Recorded: 16 September 1982
- Studio: AIR, London
- Genre: Pop
- Length: 3:18
- Label: Columbia
- Songwriter: Paul McCartney
- Producer: George Martin

Paul McCartney singles chronology
"Say Say Say" (1983)	"So Bad" (1983)	"No More Lonely Nights" (1984)

"So Bad" is a song written by Paul McCartney that was first released on his 1983 album Pipes of Peace. It was also released as a single in the US, with the album's title track as the B-side and reached number 23 on the Billboard Hot 100. In the UK, "So Bad" was released as the B-side of the "Pipes of Peace" single. A version of "So Bad" was later released on McCartney's 1984 album Give My Regards to Broad Street and it was used in the accompanying film.

== Writing and recording ==
McCartney largely composed the song by improvising on the family piano with his children around him. McCartney said of the song:

I started singing it at home with the kids and Linda and [the line] "Girl I love you so bad" was fine for everyone except James, who would have been about four and a half, and I felt I was leaving him out. So just for him I sang "Boy I love you so bad" and he would go all shy and it was lovely. And then I worked it into a song as "And she said Boy I love you so bad." It was a little melody I had, and I started writing words. They seemed to be very simple and very corny, but they seemed to fit. There was no way I could make them more grammatical. Girl I love you so bad-ly...it had to be Girl I love you so bad.

== Lyrics and music ==
Beatle historian John Blaney describes "So Bad" as a "typical McCartney ballad" and a "schmaltzy love song." Music professor Vincent Benitez describes it as "a gentle, Motown-sounding ballad." The song is in the key of G major. The verses have a melody that descends from a high B to a B an octave lower. McCartney sings in a falsetto voice. The lyrics talk about how a strong love can be painful, but if the singer has his loved ones with him he need not fear.

The musicians consist of Paul McCartney on bass, Eric Stewart on guitar, Linda McCartney on keyboards and Ringo Starr on drums. George Martin produced the song.

== Reception ==
According to Beatle historians Chip Madinger and Mark Easter, the "sugary-sweet, almost unbearably coy lyrics and melody made for a song that was not particularly well-received by fans or critics." Music journalist Rob Sheffield found the music to be incredibly beautiful but the lyrics to be "barely a first draft." Sheffield goes on to call it "an index of things Paul does better than anyone ever (write a melody, sing lovesick high notes, bat his eyes) but also the things he doesn't do well (make decisions about production, choose his supporting cast, finish the damn song)."

Allmusic critic Stephen Thomas Erlewine said that Paul "gets a little sticky" on the song but says that "the melody saves him." Rolling Stone critic Parke Puterbaugh calls "So Bad" a "big [ballad] in the grand McCartney tradition" but says that it "leaves virtually no impression at all." PopMatters critic Jeff Strowe is less kind calling the song "Bee Gees-esque" but saying that McCartney "sullies his sterling songwriting reputation," and is particularly critical of the refrain of "Well it feels so good / Sometimes it feels so bad / This is worse than anything I’ve ever had."

"So Bad" peaked at number 23 on the Billboard Hot 100. It did slightly better in Canada, reaching the Top 20 of the RPM singles chart in Canada. It did even better on Adult Contemporary charts, reaching number 3 in the US and number 2 in Canada.

== Music video ==
The music video accompanying the single release showed the McCartneys, Stewart and Starr miming playing their instruments to the version of the song on Pipes of Peace, interspersed with photos taken by Linda. According to Sheffield, the video makes him feel that Paul "went out of his way to flaunt how little he cared."

== Give My Regards to Broad Street version ==
"So Bad" was re-recorded for the film Give My Regards to Broad Street and was included on the film's soundtrack album. This version is similar to the original version on Pipes of Peace but Dave Edmunds and Chris Spedding play guitar instead of Eric Stewart, although Stewart appears in the film.

== Personnel ==
According to The Paul McCartney Project:

- Paul McCartney – lead and backing vocals, bass, possible piano, possible electric piano
- Linda McCartney – backing vocals, possible keyboards
- Eric Stewart – backing vocals, electric guitar
- Ringo Starr – drums

== Charts ==
Chart (1983–1984)	Peak position
Canada Top Singles (RPM)	18
US Billboard Hot 100	23
