= Coming Up (song) =

1980 single by Paul McCartney

Single by Paul McCartney

from the album McCartney II
- B-side: "Coming Up" (Live at Glasgow); "Lunch Box/Odd Sox"
- Released: 11 April 1980
- Recorded: June–July 1979
- Studio: Home Studio, Peasmarsh; Spirit of Ranachan, Campbeltown
- Genre: New wave; disco; synth-pop
- Length: 3:49 (album/single edit); 5:35 (full length version); 4:10 ("Live at Glasgow" version)
- Label: Parlophone (UK); Columbia (US)
- Songwriter: Paul McCartney
- Producer: Paul McCartney

Paul McCartney singles chronology
"Wonderful Christmastime" (1979)	"Coming Up" (1980)	"Waterfalls" (1980)

Wings singles chronology
"Rockestra Theme" (1979)	"Coming Up" (1980)

Back cover
- Reverse side of the picture sleeve

McCartney II track listing
- 11 tracks Side one: 1. "Coming Up"; 2. "Temporary Secretary"; 3. "On the Way"; 4. "Waterfalls"; 5. "Nobody Knows"; Side two: 6. "Front Parlour"; 7. "Summer's Day Song"; 8. "Frozen Jap"; 9. "Bogey Music"; 10. "Darkroom"; 11. "One of These Days"

Music video
- "Coming Up" on YouTube

"Coming Up" is a song written and performed by the English rock musician Paul McCartney, released as the opening track on his third solo studio album McCartney II (1980). Like other songs on the album, the song has a synthesised sound, featuring sped-up backing vocals created by using a vari-speed tape machine. McCartney played all instruments.

The single was a hit in the UK, peaking at number 2 on the Singles Chart. In the United States and Canada, the live version of the song performed by Paul McCartney and Wings in Glasgow the year prior (released as the B-side to the single) saw greater success and reached number one in both countries. It was the final single credited to Paul McCartney and Wings that made the Billboard Hot 100 chart.

== Background ==
In a Rolling Stone interview, McCartney explained how the song came about:

I originally cut it on my farm in Scotland. I went into the studio each day and just started with a drum track. Then I built it up bit by bit without any idea of how the song was going to turn out. After laying down the drum track, I added guitars and bass, building up the backing track.

Then I thought, 'Well, OK, what am I going to do for the voice?' I was working with a vari-speed machine with which you can speed up your voice, or take it down a little bit. That's how the voice sound came about.

— Paul McCartney

It is unclear whether Linda McCartney provided additional vocals for the song. According to some sources, Paul sang all vocals on McCartney II using vari-speed effects. However, in a 1980 interview, when asked if Linda contributed to McCartney II, Paul said "she sang a couple of things that were too high for me to sing like the high voice on 'Coming Up'." In his personnel listing for the song, Luca Perasi is unsure if Linda sang backing vocals.

John Lennon, who was in the Beatles with McCartney, described "Coming Up" as "a good piece of work", and it prompted him to return to recording in 1980. Lennon later stated his preference for the studio version over the live version that was released as a single: "I thought that 'Coming Up' was great and I like the freak version that he made in his barn better than that live Glasgow one. If I'd have been with him I would've said 'that's the one' too."

== Critical reception ==
Cash Box called it an "unusually produced but cute track". Record World said that "electronic keyboards, a dance beat and Paul's pop vocals give the contemporary sound." Writing for Stereogum, Tom Breihan thought the song was "a weird demo" and "a clumsy attempt to play catchup to the Talking Heads". He gave the B-side a 5/10, stating that the live horns and vocals were an improvement but the performance was too restrained.

== Live version ==
A live version of the song was recorded in Glasgow, Scotland, on 17 December 1979 by Wings during their tour of the UK. An edited version from the performance was included as one of two songs on the B-side; the other song on the B-side was "Lunchbox/Odd Sox", a Wings song that dated back to Venus and Mars (1975). Both songs were credited to Paul McCartney and Wings.

Columbia Records wanted to put the live version on McCartney II but McCartney resisted the change, wanting to keep it a solo studio album. Instead, a one-sided 7" white-label promotional copy of the Wings version was included with the album in North America.

"Coming Up (Live at Glasgow)" has since appeared on the US versions of the McCartney compilations All the Best! (1987) and Wingspan: Hits and History (2001), while the solo studio version is included on UK and international releases.

The full length version of the song with an additional verse from the 1979 Glasgow show was finally released as bonus track on the Paul McCartney Archive Collection reissue of McCartney II in 2011.

A different live Wings recording of "Coming Up" appears on the album Concerts for the People of Kampuchea (1981), also recorded in 1979.

== Music video ==
The music video for "Coming Up", directed by Keith McMillan, features Paul McCartney playing ten roles (himself, two guitarists, a bassist, a drummer, a keyboardist, and four saxophonists) and Linda McCartney playing two (one female backing vocalist and one male backing vocalist). The "band" is identified as "the Plastic Macs" on the drum kit.

In his audio commentary on the video collection The McCartney Years (2007), McCartney identified characters that were impersonations of specific artists: Hank Marvin (guitarist from the Shadows), Ron Mael of Sparks (keyboards), a 'Beatlemania-era' version of himself (bass), and a drummer vaguely inspired by John Bonham from Led Zeppelin. Others, such as authors Fred Bronson and Kenneth Womack, have suggested that there are other identifiable impersonations in the video, such as Andy Mackay, Frank Zappa and Buddy Holly; McCartney said the other roles were simply comic relief.

The video premiered in the UK on The Kenny Everett Video Show on 14 April 1980 and in the US on Saturday Night Live on 17 May 1980.

== Release ==
The single was released on 11 April 1980. In the UK, the single was an immediate hit, reaching No. 2 in its third week on the chart.

In the US, Columbia Records promoted the live version, which subsequently received more airplay than the studio version. McCartney was unaware of Columbia's move. An executive from Columbia Records explained the switch by stating "Americans like the sound of Paul McCartney's real voice." The live version reached No. 1 on the Billboard Hot 100 and was certified gold by the Recording Industry Association of America for sales of over one million copies. Although the live version received more airplay and was considered to be the "hit", Billboard listed the A-side on the Hot 100 for the first 12 weeks on the chart, including three weeks at No. 1, before switching to the more popular B-side for the remaining nine weeks on the chart.

== Track listing ==
7" single (R 6035)

1. "Coming Up" – 3:49
2. "Coming Up" (Live at Glasgow) – 3:51
  - Performed by Paul McCartney and Wings
3. "Lunch Box/Odd Sox" – 3:54
  - Performed by Paul McCartney and Wings

== Personnel ==
=== Studio version ===
According to Luca Perasi:

- Paul McCartney – vocals, backing vocals, synthesiser, electric guitar, bass, drums, handclaps, tambourine

=== Live version ===
- Paul McCartney – lead vocals, bass
- Linda McCartney – keyboards, vocals
- Denny Laine – guitar, vocals
- Laurence Juber – guitar
- Steve Holley – drums
- Tony Dorsey – trombone
- Thaddeus Richard – saxophone
- Howie Casey – saxophone
- Steve Howard – trumpet

=== "Lunch Box / Odd Sox" ===
- Paul McCartney – piano
- Linda McCartney – Moog synthesizer
- Denny Laine – guitar
- Geoff Britton – drums
- Tony Dorsey – bass

== Chart performance ==
=== Weekly charts ===
Weekly chart performance for "Coming Up"
Chart (1980)	Peak position
Australia (Kent Music Report)	2
Austria (Ö3 Austria Top 40)	15
Belgium (Ultratop 50 Flanders)	18
Canada RPM 100 Singles	1
Ireland (IRMA)	7
Italy (Musica e Dischi)	7
Italy (TV Sorrisi e Canzoni)	13
Japan (Oricon)	66
Netherlands (Dutch Top 40)	22
Netherlands (Single Top 100)	20
New Zealand (Recorded Music NZ)	2
Norway (VG-lista)	2
Spain (AFE)	3
UK Singles (OCC)	2
US Billboard Hot 100	1
US Cashbox Top 100	2
US Billboard Adult Contemporary	48
West Germany (GfK)	11

=== Year-end charts ===
Annual chart rankings for "Coming Up"
Chart (1980)	Position
Australia (Kent Music Report)	22
Canada (RPM)	11
Italy (Musica e dischi)	29
New Zealand (RMNZ)	12
Spain (AFE)	12
UK Singles (OCC)	48
US Billboard Hot 100	7

== Certifications ==
Region	Certification	Certified units/sales
United States (RIAA)	Gold	1,000,000^{^}
^{^} Shipments figures based on certification alone.

== See also ==
- List of Billboard Hot 100 number ones of 1980
