= The Freelance Hellraiser =

British musician

Roy Kerr, also known as the Freelance Hellraiser, is an English DJ, producer, remixer and one of the creators of the UK bootleg (mashup) scene.

== Career ==
Under the Freelance Hellraiser name, Kerr gained fame with a mashup in 2001 called "A Stroke of Genius", which combined an instrumental edit of the Strokes' track "Hard to Explain" with Christina Aguilera's pop hit "Genie in a Bottle". Although originally greeted by a cease and desist order by RCA (the label which both Aguilera and the Strokes are signed to), he went on to remix Aguilera's single "Fighter", as well as tracks for Placebo and ex-Verve frontman Richard Ashcroft. "A Stroke of Genius" was later dubbed as "the song that defines the decade" in an article by The Guardian.

In 2006, he released his album Waiting for Clearance, featuring such artists as Jan Hammer, Iain Archer and Snow Patrol frontman Gary Lightbody. The following year, he formed Kid Gloves with Anu Pillai, writing and producing two songs for Ladyhawke's gold-selling eponymous debut album, including the single "Paris Is Burning".

=== Collaborations ===
In 2004, he was commissioned by Paul McCartney to remix some lesser-known McCartney tracks as preshow entertainment for his tour of that year. Those tracks, and several more, were released under the name Twin Freaks. In 2009, Kid Gloves contributed to Little Boots' gold-selling debut album, Hands, writing and producing her duet, "Symmetry", with the Human League's Phil Oakey.

== Discography ==
=== Albums (as The Freelance Hellraiser) ===
- Waiting for Clearance

=== Singles (as The Freelance Hellraiser) ===
- "Want You to Know"
- "We Don't Belong"
- "Weightlessness"
- "You Can Cry All You Want"

=== Remixes (as The Freelance Hellraiser) ===
- Richard Ashcroft - "Check the Meaning"
- Christina Aguilera - "Fighter"
- Arthur Baker - "Glow"
- Placebo - "English Summer Rain"
- The Reindeer Section - "Your Are My Joy"
- Ian Brown - "Northern Lights"
- Editors - "Blood"
- Just Jack - "Triple Tone Eyes"
- The Darkness - "Girlfriend"
- Snow Patrol - "Hands Open"
- Iain Archer - "When It Kicks In"
- Siouxsie Sioux - "Here Comes That Day"
- My Robot Friend - "Rapture"
- Cuban Friends - "My Love Is Alive"
- Shakira - "Objection"
- The Verve - "Love Is Noise"
- Sophie Ellis-Bextor - Wanderlust (remixed the whole album)

=== DJ mixes ===
- Mixmag 50 Big Tunes 2003 Cover CD
- 45 Special 2001 Bootleg Mix

=== Singles (as Kid Gloves) ===
- "Music Power" (2011)
- "Bare Knuckle" (2010)

=== Production (as Kid Gloves) ===
- Cheryl Cole and Lana Del Rey - "Ghetto Baby"
- Ladyhawke - "Paris Is Burning"
- Ladyhawke - "Paris Is Burning (Remix)"
- Ladyhawke - "Manipulating Woman"
- Little Boots - "Symmetry" (featuring Phil Oakley)
- Little Boots - "Not Now"
- VV Brown - "Game Over"
- Arsenal - "Lokemo"

=== Remixes (as Kid Gloves) ===
- Black Kids - "Look at Me"
- Santigold - "Lights Out"
- Arsenal - "Estupendo"

=== Albums (as Twin Freaks) ===
- Twin Freaks (2005)

=== Singles (as Twin Freaks) ===
- "Really Love You"
- "What's That You're Doing"
