= Peasmarsh =

Village in East Sussex, England

Coordinates: 50.98°N 0.69°E

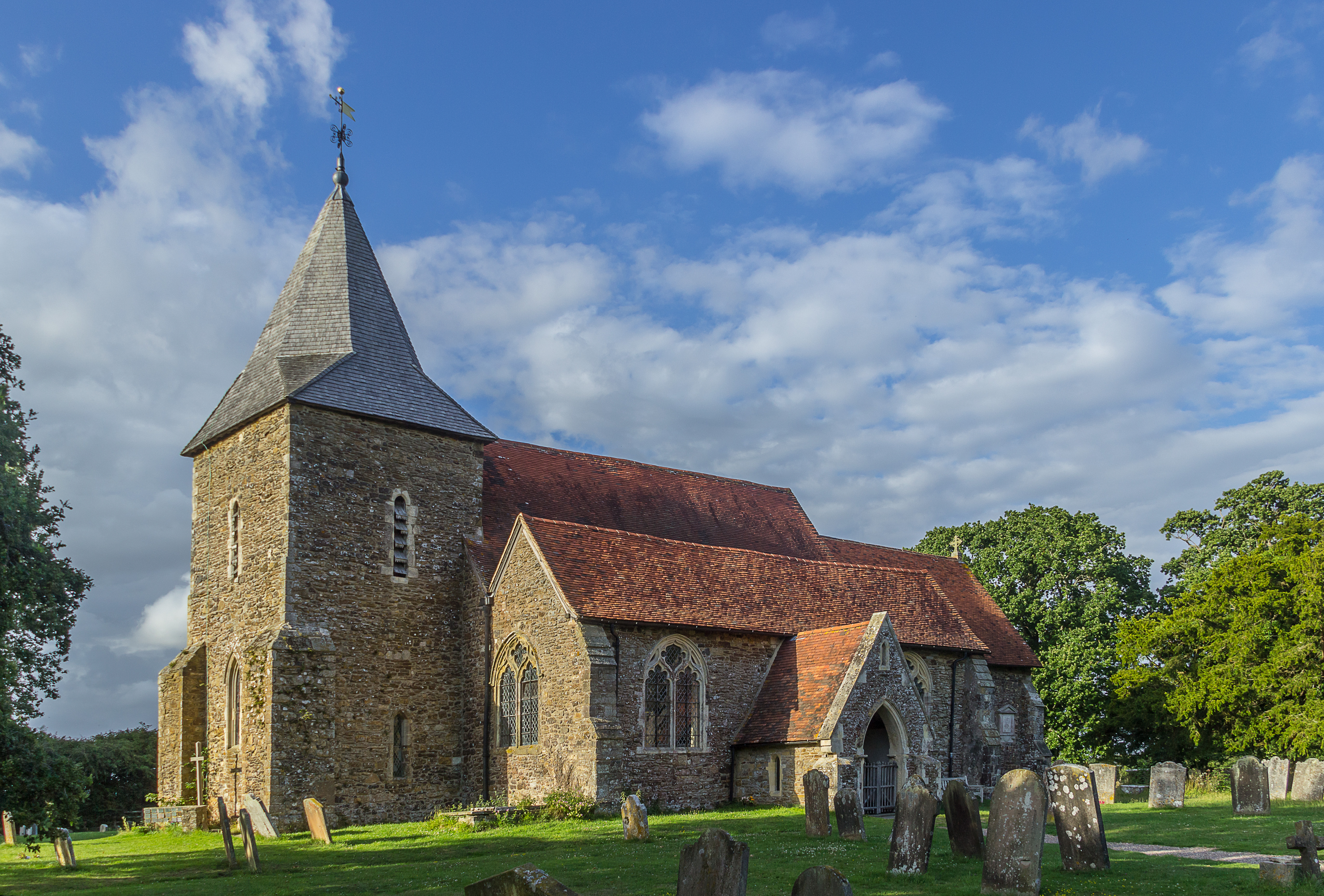
- The Norman church of St Peter and St Paul, Peasmarsh

- Location within East Sussex
- Area: 15.8 km^{2} (6.1 sq mi)
- Population: 1,163 (Parish-2011)
  - Density: 191/sq mi (74/km^{2})
- OS grid reference: TQ886229
  - London: 50 miles (80 km) NW
- District: Rother
- Shire county: East Sussex
- Region: South East
- Country: England
- Sovereign state: United Kingdom
- Post town: RYE
- Postcode district: TN31
- Dialling code: 01797
- Police: Sussex
- Fire: East Sussex
- Ambulance: South East Coast
- UK Parliament: Bexhill and Battle

Peasmarsh is a village and civil parish in the Rother district, in the county of East Sussex in England. It is located on the A268 road between Rye and Beckley, some 3 miles (4.8 km) north-west of Rye.

The village church, dedicated to St Peter and Paul, lies about one mile (1.6 km) from the village; it is thought the village centre was moved after the Black Death plague. There are three public houses and a motel in close proximity to the village; and a country house hotel with a leisure centre. The village is also home to an independent supermarket, although the proprietors choose not to open their store on Sundays. Peasmarsh Place, now a residential care home, is to the south-east of the village.

Every year, in June, the Peasmarsh Chamber Music Festival, bringing world-class concerts of chamber music, is held in the church.

== Governance ==
The lowest level of government is the Peasmarsh parish council. The parish council is responsible for local amenities such as the provision of litter bins, bus shelters and allotments. They also provide a voice into the district council meetings. The parish council comprises nine councillors with elections being held every four years. The May 2007 election was uncontested.

Rother District council provides the next level of government with services such as refuse collection, planning consent, leisure amenities and council tax collection. Peasmarsh lies within the Rother Levels ward, which provides two councillors. The May 2007 election returned two Conservatives councillors.

East Sussex county council is the third tier of government, providing education, libraries and highway maintenance. Peasmarsh falls within the Northern Rother ward. Peter Jones, Conservative, was elected in the May 2005 election with 49.7% of the vote.

The UK Parliament constituency for Peasmarsh is Bexhill and Battle. Gregory Barker was re-elected in the May 2005 election, and the current Member of Parliament is Huw Merriman, a member of the Conservative Party.

Prior to Brexit in 2020, Peasmarsh was part of the South East England constituency in the European Parliament.

== Notable residents ==
- Paul McCartney, musician and former member of the Beatles
- Rudi Martinus van Dijk, international composer
- Anthony Roland, art collector and film producer
- Maria Ann Smith namesake of the Granny Smith apple
- Anthony Marwood, violinist
