= Berry House =

Berry House may refer to:

in the United States

(by state, then city/town)

- Berry House (Palmer, Alaska)
- Berry House (Beebe, Arkansas)
- Berry House (Dardanelle, Arkansas)
- George O. Berry House, Columbus, Georgia
- Thomas A. Berry House, Dalton, Georgia
- Dr. William E. and Ethel Rosenberger Berry House, Oskaloosa, Iowa
- George F. Berry House, Frankfort, Kentucky, listed on the National Register of Historic Places (NRHP)
- Richard Berry Jr. House (Springfield, Kentucky)
- Frank A. and Elizabeth Berry House, Faribault, Minnesota, listed on the NRHP
- Captain James Berry House, Harwich, Massachusetts
- Burnette–Berry House, Kansas City, Missouri
- Chuck Berry House, St. Louis, Missouri
- Martin Berry House, Pompton Plains, New Jersey
- Yereance–Berry House, Rutherford, New Jersey
- Col. Sidney Berry House, Northumberland, New York
- Richard Berry Jr. House (Columbus, Ohio)
- Luke D. Berry House, Cushing, Oklahoma, listed on the NRHP
- James E. Berry House, Stillwater, Oklahoma
- Berry House (Stephenville, Texas), listed on the NRHP
- J. S. Berry House, Waxahachie, Texas, listed on the NRHP
