= Sekyere West District =

- Former District
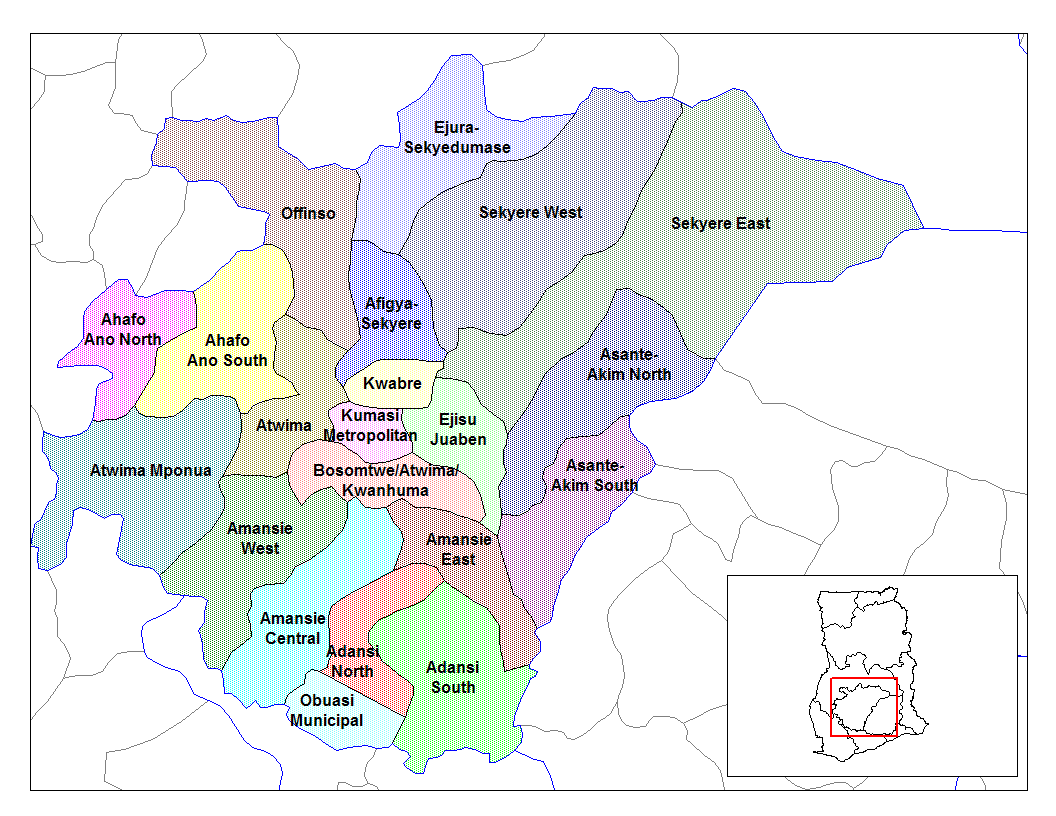
- Districts of Ashanti Region

- Location of Sekyere West District within Ashanti
- Coordinates: 7°4′N 1°24′W
- Country: Ghana
- Region: Ashanti
- Capital: Mampong

Government
  - Municipal Chief Executive: Thomas Appiah-Kubi

Area
  - Total: 2,345 km^{2} (905 sq mi)

Population (2012)
  - Total: —
- Time zone: UTC+0 (GMT)

Sekyere West District is a former district that was located in Ashanti Region, Ghana. Originally created as an ordinary district assembly in 1988, which was created from the former Sekyere District Council. However on 29 February 2008, it was split off into two new districts: Mampong Municipal District (which it was elevated to municipal district assembly status on that same year; capital: Mampong) and Sekyere Central District (capital: Nsuta). The district assembly was located in the northern part of Ashanti Region and had Mampong as its capital town.

== Sources ==
- "Districts of Ghana". Statoids.
- GhanaDistricts.com
