= Mprim =

- Village
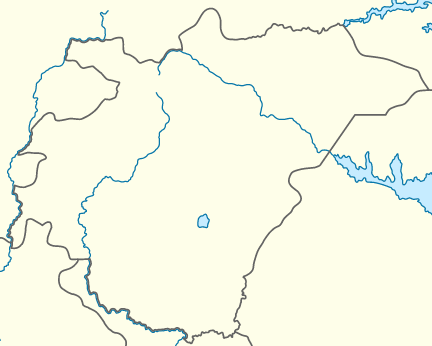
- Location of Mprim within Ashanti Mprim (Ghana)
- Coordinates: 7°01′39″N 1°27′01″W
- Sovereign state: Ghana
- Region: Ashanti
- Municipality: Mampong Municipal
- Elevation: 1,299 ft (396 m)
- Time zone: GMT
  - Summer (DST): GMT

Mprim is a village in the Mampong Municipal, a municipality in the Ashanti Region of Ghana.

== Renowned native citizens ==
Renowned native citizens of Mprim
Citizen	Contribution
Akwasi Ampofo Adjei (1947 - 2004)	Musician
T A Boateng (1937 - 2011)	Educationist
