= Mampong =

Town in the Ashanti Region, Ghana

Asante Mampong
- District Capital
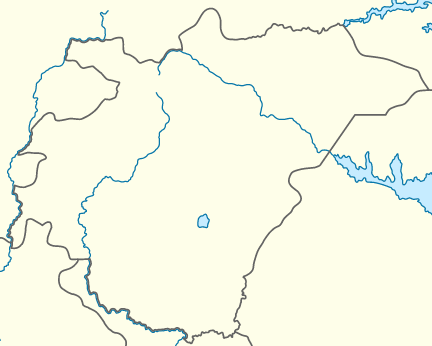
- Location of Mampong within Ashanti
- Coordinates: 7°4′N 1°24′W
- Country: Ghana
- Region: Ashanti
- Municipality: Mampong Municipal

Government
  - Mamponghene: Nana Osei Bonsu II

Population (2012)
  - Total: 42,037
  - Ethnicity: Ashante
- Time zone: UTC+0 (GMT)
  - Summer (DST): GMT
- postal code: AM
- Area code: 032
- climate: Aw
- Website: mma.gov.gh

Mampong is a town and the capital of the Mampong Municipal in the Ashanti Region of Ghana. As of 2012, the town has a population of 42,037 people. The town is home to the Mamponghene, Nana Osei Bonsu II.

== History ==
Agona-Akrofoso, often regarded as 'Old Mampong', was the capital of the Mampong state, one of 4 Akan states under the Denkyira state. It is suspected to have been formed around the same time as Kumasi. The capital was the first place to host the Mampong Stool or Silver-Stool of the Mamponghene. Shortly after the formation of the Ashanti Kingdom, the capital was moved to an area called Botaase, later known as Mampong.

== Economy ==
About 60% of the labor force is engaged in agriculture, followed by the service, commerce and manufacturing sectors. Major crops grown include carrots and groundnuts. Small business can be located all across the town, including milling machines, which plays a big role in the local food industry. Although, the mills have a high chance of being contaminated, resulted in foodborne poisoning.

== Culture ==
Mampong is located in the Mampong traditional area along with 48 other population centers. The town is also the centre of the Anglican Diocese of Asante Mampong, inaugurated in 2014. On 3 March 1995, Pope John Paul II created the Roman Catholic Diocese of Konongo-Mampong, whose headquarters are located here. It is a suffragan diocese of the Metropolitan Ecclesiastical Province of Kumasi.

== Geography ==
The town is bordered by the Sekyere South district to the south, Sekyere Central district to the east and Ejura Sekyedumase district towards the north. It is located about 60 km (37 mi) from Kumasi.

Mampong has a tropical savanna climate (Köppen climate classification Aw), experiencing wet seasons and a dry season and the temperature being hot year-round. The average annual rainfall is around 1,270 mm (50 in) and the mean monthly temperature ranging from 22 to 30 °C (72 to 86 °F).

== Human resources ==
=== Health ===
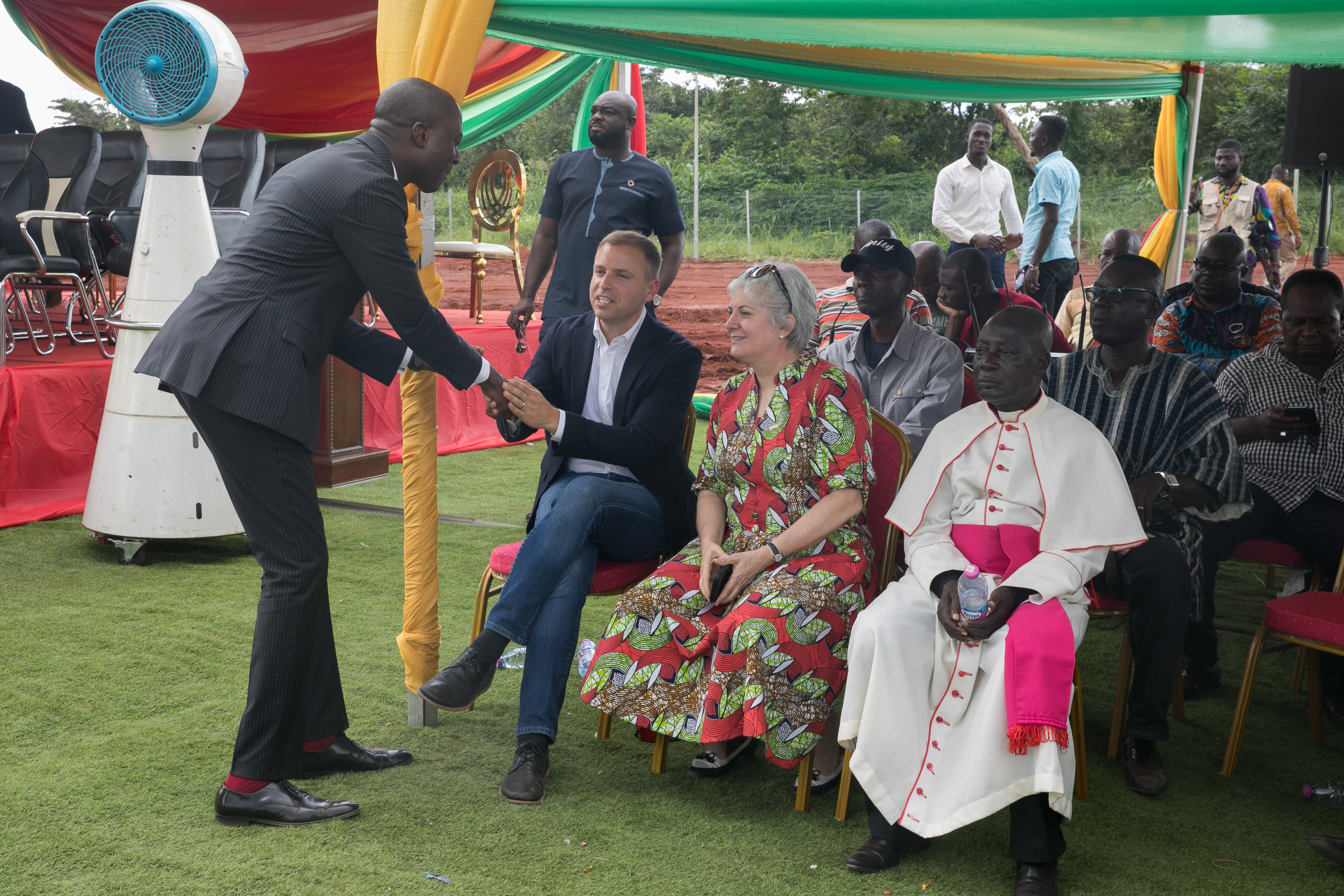
Opening of Zipline in Mampong. Ambassador Stephanie Sullivan and her husband joins in for the celebration.

On 10 October 2019, the Ghana Drone Delivery Service launched a medical drone delivery base in Mampong, one of four population centers in the country included in the program. The facility's goal is to use drones to deliver medical supplies all across the region. The drones are operated by Zipline, a robotics company based in California.

=== Education ===
The biggest educational institution in the town is the Mampong Technical College of Education. It was established in 1967 as a teacher education institution and was accredited to the tertiary level of education in 2007. It is affiliated with the University of Education, Winneba.

The following is a list of colleges/universities and senior high schools in Mampong:

Colleges/Universities

- College of Agriculture Education (University of Education Mampong Campus)
- Nursing And Midwifery Training College, Mampong
- Mampong Technical College of Education
- St. Monica's College of Education

Senior high schools

- Amaniampong Senior High School
- St. Monica's Senior High School
- St. Joseph Seminary Senior High School, Mampong (formerly Sekyereman Secondary School)
- Kofiase Adventist Senior High Technical
- Oduko Boatemaa Senior High School

== Notable residents ==
- Akwasi Amankwa Afrifa (1936–1979), former Head of State, soldier and politician
- Akwasi Ampofo Adjei (born 1947), founder and leader of Kumapim Royals Band, highlife musician
- J. H. Kwabena Nketia (1921–2019), ethnomusicologist and composer
- Ebenezer Augustus Kwasi Akuoko (1928–2021), lawyer
- Gerald Asamoah (born 1978), retired footballer who played for the Germany national football team and FC Schalke 04
- Benjamin Samuel Kofi Kwakye (born n/a), former Inspector General of Police of the Ghana Police Service
- Agyeman Badu Akosa (born 1953), Ghanaian educator, politician, pathologist
- Reginald Reynolds Amponsah (1919–2009), potter, politician, former Minister of State

== See also ==
- Asante Empire
- List of rulers of Asante
