= Ampofo =

Ampofo is a surname. Notable people with the surname include:

- Akosua Adomako Ampofo (fl. 1989–present), Ghanaian academic
- Ama Ampofo (born 1991), Ghanaian actress and model
- Daniel Kwame Ampofo (born 1950), Ghanaian politician
- David Ampofo (born 1961), Ghanaian journalist
- Francis Ampofo (born 1967), British-Ghanaian boxer
- Gifty Twum-Ampofo (born 1967), Ghanaian politician
- Kwame Twumasi Ampofo (born 1968), Ghanaian politician
- Oku Ampofo (1908–1998), Ghanaian artist
- Owuraku Ampofo (born 1996), Ghanaian journalist
- Rose Akua Ampofo (1948–2003), Ghanaian educator and feminist
- Samuel Ofosu-Ampofo (born 1962), Ghanaian politician
- Bismark Ampofo (born 2002), Ghanaian professional footballer

== See also ==
- Akwasi Ampofo Adjei (1947–2004), Ghanaian musician
