= Adelaide Ntim =

Ghanaian politician

Hon. Adelaide Ntim
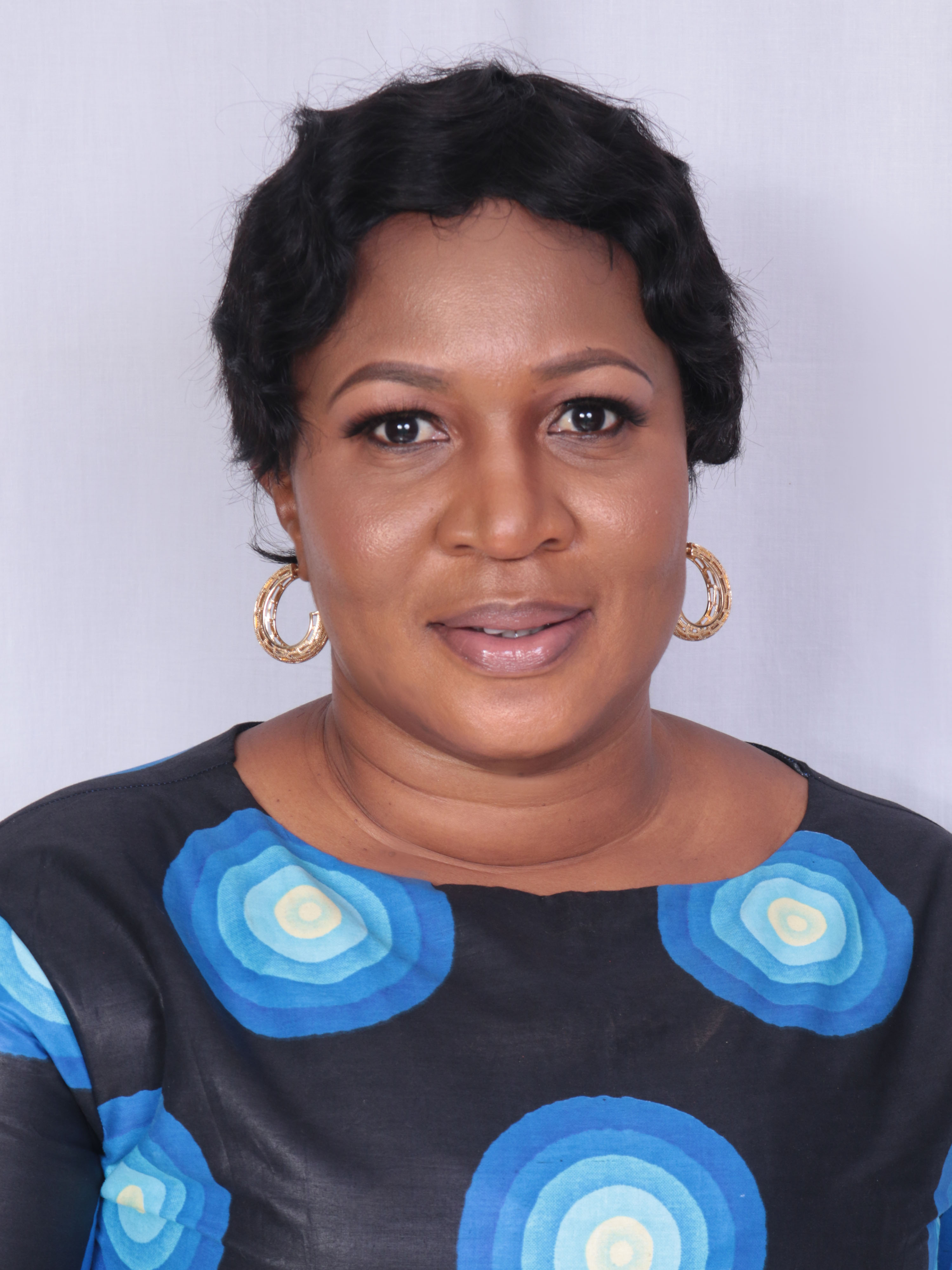

Member of Parliament for Nsuta-Kwamang-Beposo Constituency
- Incumbent
- Assumed office 7 January 2021
- Preceded by: Kwame Osei-Prempeh

Personal details
- Born: Adelaide Yaa Agyeiwaa Ntim; 24 June 1971 (age 55) Nsuta-Ashanti, Ghana
- Party: New Patriotic Party
- Occupation: Politician
- Committees: Foreign Affairs Committee (Vice Chairperson); Environment, Science and Technology Committee

Adelaide Yaa Agyeiwaa Ntim (born 24 June 1971) is a Ghanaian politician. She has been the Member of Parliament representing the Nsuta-Kwamang-Beposo Constituency in the Ashanti Region since 7 January 2021.

== Early life and education ==
Adelaide Yaa Agyeiwaa Ntim was born on 24 June 1971 and hails from Nsuta-Ashanti. She holds two diplomas - Pharmacy Assistant (2017), and Basic Criminal Law (2019).

== Political career ==
Ntim ousted the then member of parliament for the Nsuta-Kwamang-Beposo constituency, Kwame Asafu Adjei, in the June 2020 New Patriotic Party (NPP) Parliamentary Primaries to become the party's candidate for the December 2020 election. Prior to becoming a member of the Ghanaian Parliament, Ntim renounced her citizenship of the United States of America in August 2020. She won the December 2020 parliamentary election with 23,622 votes representing 71.7% of the total votes cast, beating her opponent Newman Dapaah of the National Democratic Congress (NDC) who obtained 9,321 votes representing 28.3% of the total valid votes cast.

=== Committees ===
As a first-timer in Parliament, she serves as the Vice Chairperson and a Member of the Foreign Affairs and Environment, Science and Technology Committees in parliament respectively.

== Personal life ==
She is a Christian.

== Philanthropy ==
In June 2021, Ntim funded abandoned school projects in Kruwi and Asuafu in the Nsuta-Kwamang-Beposo Constituency. She also presented equipment and tools such as sewing machines and hairdryers to seamstresses, tailors and beauticians. She also gave farm equipment, seedlings and money to farmer groups. Communities such as Abrewa Anko and Amangoase also received water systems.
