= Kwame Asafu Adjei =

Ghanaian politician

Hon. Kwame Asafu-Adjei

Member of Parliament for Nsuta-Kwamang-Beposo Constituency
- In office 7 January 2017 – 6 January 2021
- Succeeded by: Adelaide Ntim

Personal details
- Born: Kwame Asafu-Adjei; 10 October 1950 (age 75) Nsuta, Ghana
- Party: New Patriotic Party
- Occupation: Politician
- Profession: Deputy Director
- Portfolio: Food, Agriculture and Cocoa Affairs

Kwame Asafu-Adjei is a Ghanaian politician and member of the Seventh Parliament of the Fourth Republic of Ghana, representing the Nsuta-Kwamang-Beposo Constituency in the Ashanti Region on the ticket of the New Patriotic Party.

== Early life and education ==
Adjei was born on 10 October 1950 in a town called Nsuta in the Ashanti Region. He acquired a Master of Science degree in Agricultural Economics from Tennessee State University, Nashville, USA in 1980.

== Career ==
He worked as the chief executive officer of Asafaco Consult Company Limited in Accra. He was the Deputy Director of Policy, Planning, Monitoring & Evaluation (PPME) and the Head of the Livestock Planning Committee at MOFA.

== Political career ==
He was elected into the sixth parliament of the 4th republic of Ghana on 7 January 2013 after he contested in the 2012 Ghanaian General Elections. He was then reelected into the seventh parliament of the fourth republic of Ghana on 7 January 2017 after obtaining 51.03% of the valid votes cast at the 2016 Ghanaian General Elections. He is a former Member of Parliament for Nsuta-Kwamang-Beposo Constituency.

In 2017, he was the acting chairman of the Food, Agriculture and Cocoa Affairs.

== Personal life ==
He is a Christian and married with three children.
