= Unmanned aerial vehicles in law enforcement =

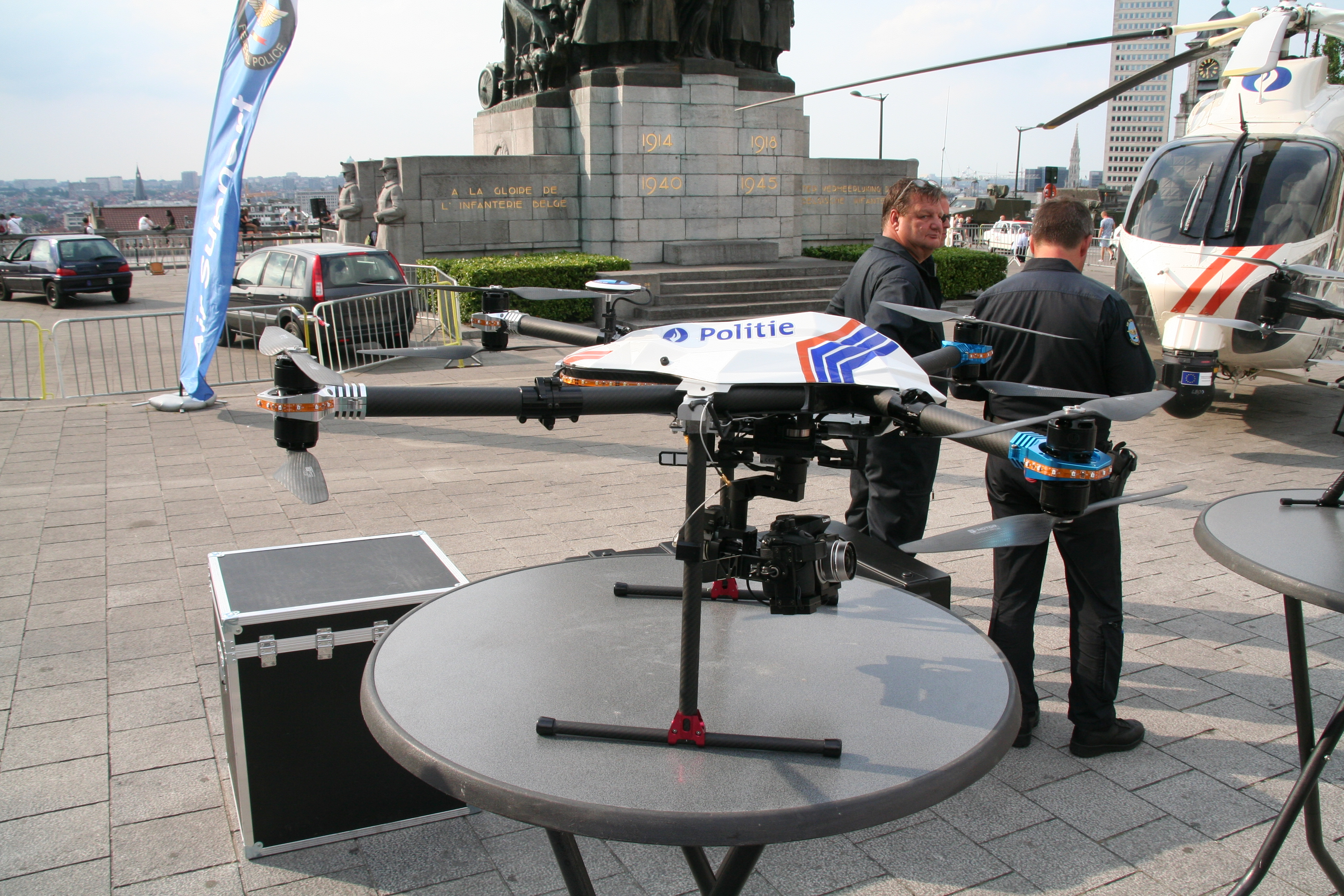
Drone of the Belgian Federal Police in Brussels, 2016

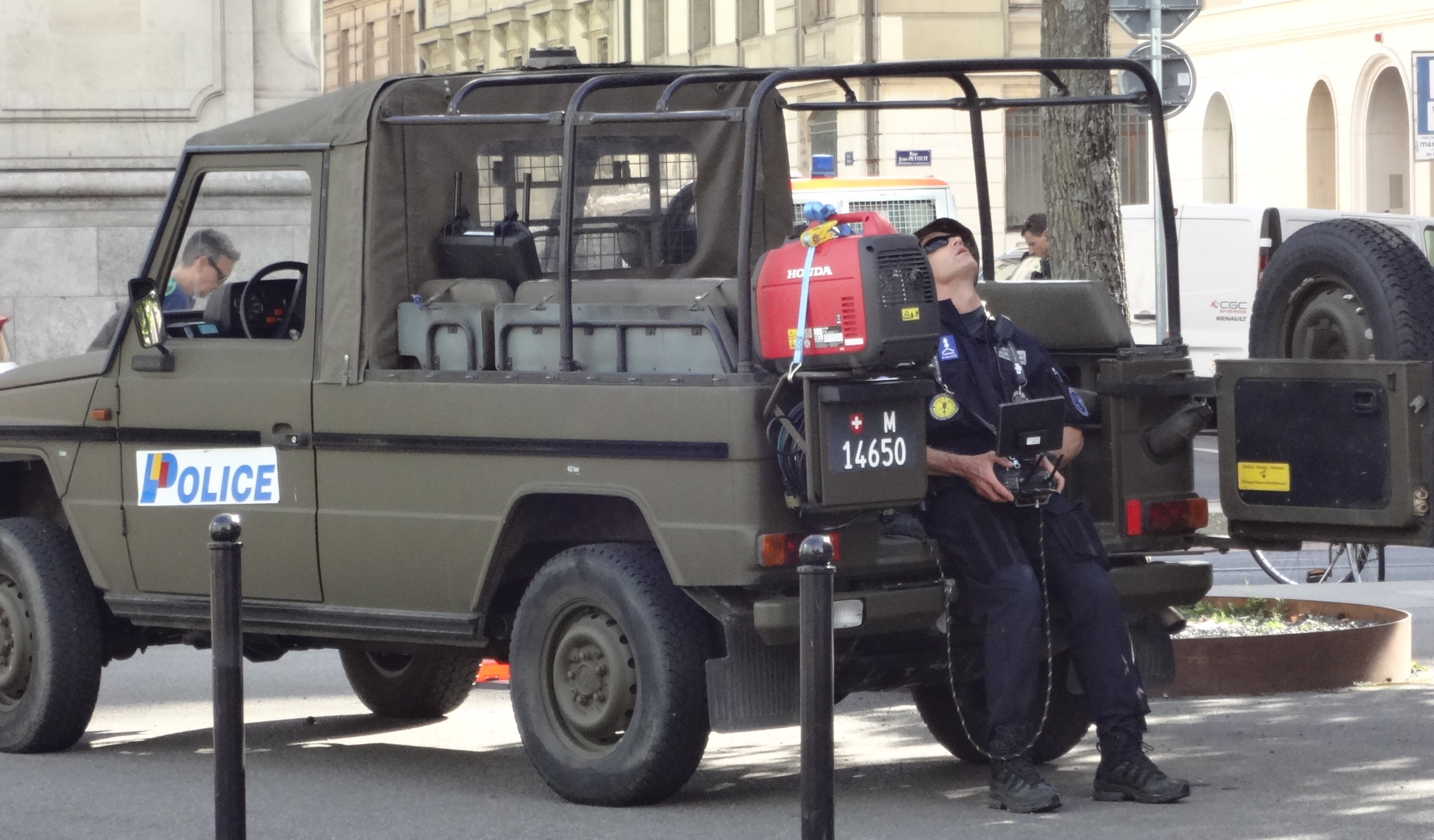
A Swiss police officer operates a UAV during a protest in Geneva, 2019

Unmanned aerial vehicles (UAVs) have been used for domestic police work in various countries around the world since the mid-2000s. Their appeal comes from their small size, lack of crew, and lower cost compared to police helicopters. UAVs may be used for search and rescue operations, aerial patrols, and other roles that are usually served by crewed police aircraft. UAVs can be powerful surveillance tools by carrying camera systems capable of license plate scanning and thermal imaging, as well as radio equipment and other sensors. While a vast majority of law enforcement UAVs are unarmed, documents obtained by digital rights group Electronic Frontier Foundation indicated the U.S. Customs and Border Protection would consider arming their UAVs with "non-lethal weapons designed to immobilize" targets.

A dozen U.S. police forces had applied for UAV permits by March 2013. This increased over time, with 167 police and fire departments purchasing unmanned aerial vehicles in the United States in 2016, double the number that was purchased in 2015.

Several activists and organizations such as the Electronic Frontier Foundation, the American Civil Liberties Union, the Electronic Privacy Information Center, and progressive activist Jim Hightower have expressed privacy concerns over law enforcement use of UAVs for surveillance purposes. Several laws and regulations have been proposed or passed in various jurisdictions that would limit police use of UAVs for surveillance.

== By country ==
=== China ===
Police forces in Xinjiang Province have been using DJI drones for surveillance of the population since the company signed a strategic cooperation agreement with local authorities in 2017.

=== Germany ===
The Deutsche Bahn (German national railways) said in 2013 that it would test small surveillance UAVs with thermal cameras to prosecute vandals who spray graffiti on its property at night. Graffiti incidents cost the Deutsche Bahn $10 million per year to clean up.

=== Ghana ===
The Ghana Drone Delivery Service was launched on 24 April 2019. The Ghana Police Service has adopted drone technology in order to complement the work of officers on the ground. Drone technology will enable the police force to detect and combat crime.

=== Greece ===
The Hellenic Police's Aviation Division has seen the use of drones since October 2019, after the Presidential Decree 98/2019, allowed the deployment of drones in policing and border control by the Service of Non-Staffed Aircraft (Greek: Υπηρεσία μη Στελεχωμένων Αεροσκαφών, Υ.Μ.Σ.Α.).

It uses drones of BlueBird Aero Systems with 3 ThunderBs, 1 Spylite, and multicopters by the same company, which were added to the fleet in 2014 following a €800,000 procurement. In February of 2024 the police announced the use of drones for traffic enforcement, through the Traffic Control Monitoring Operations Room (Greek: Θάλαμος Επιχειρήσεων Παρακολούθησης Ελέγχου Κυκλοφορίας) situated in the Attica region.

The Traffic Police of Thessaloniki is also reportedly using drones for the same purpose. The drones of the SNSA are also deployed to support operations of the Hellenic Fire Service during wildfires, natural disasters, earthquakes, or other emergency situations. In August of 2024 the UAV Office of the Heraklion Police Directorate was created. In 2020 it was reported that the SNSA had acquired 12 new smaller drones from a chinese manufacturer at a cost lower or equal to €300,000, with some of them used for border surveillance in the Greek-Turkish border at the Evros region.

=== India ===
Many police departments in India have procured drones for law and order and aerial surveillance.

=== South Africa ===
==== Cape Town ====
The City of Cape Town's Law Enforcement agency (the chief such agency at the metro level of government) has expanded its use of digital tools, including UAVs, in recent years. In 2025, Cape Town's Mayoral Committee Member (MCM) for Safety and Security, JP Smith, said that these implementation efforts have become part of the city's public safety operations. The City's use of drones, along with a vast network of CCTV cameras, has already proven successful in assisting with both arrests and prosecutions.

=== United States ===
Anti-ICE protest in Manhattan, police surveillance drone overhead, 2026

Three police surveillance drones overhead at the 2026 Delaney Hall protests shortly before riot police were deployed

In 2005, a fixed-wing drone was used by the Irwin County Sheriff's Office in Georgia to assist in the search for Tara Grinstead, a teacher and former beauty queen. Drone specialist Gene Robinson of RPFlightSystems, Inc. imaged large areas that could have possibly held clues to her whereabouts. Grinstead was not found during that effort, but in February 2017, one of her former students confessed to her murder and led Georgia Bureau of Investigation investigators to an area some 10 miles north of Ocilla, where possible human remains were found. This use of the fixed drone was likely the first instance of drone use by civilian police in the U.S.

In 2011, an MQ-1 Predator was controversially used to assist an arrest in Grand Forks, North Dakota, the first time a UAV had been used by law enforcement officers in the U.S. to make an arrest. The suspect, cattle rancher Rodney Brossart, was arrested by Grand Forks police after he refused to return six cows that had wandered onto his property, resulting in a sixteen-hour armed standoff between Grand Forks SWAT and Brossart and his armed sons.

The drone, which was used on loan from the U.S. Customs and Border Protection, was used to locate Brossart and his sons and let police know it was safe to make an arrest. Brossart told U.S. News & World Report that he felt the use of the drone was illegal, with his attorney stating that the use of the drone and his tasing during the arrest constituted "guerilla-like police tactics", but North Dakota District Judge Joel Medd upheld the drone's use in 2012, stating that "there was no improper use of an unmanned aerial vehicle" in the case.

In February 2013, Seattle mayor Michael McGinn ordered the Seattle Police Department to abandon plans to use UAVs after objections from residents. Two DraganflyerX6 craft had been purchased with a federal grant and the police had been granted FAA approval though they had not started using them. The drones were to be returned to the manufacturer. The Seattle Police Department had announced in October 2012 that they were drafting a policy and they were one of the first police forces in the United States to receive approval from the federal government to use UAVs. Opponents of the programme included the Washington chapter of the American Civil Liberties Union. The ACLU has also been concerned with privacy over drones that the Los Angeles Police Department had acquired.

The Electronic Frontier Foundation filed a Freedom of Information Act request on 10 January 2012 against the Federal Aviation Administration. As a result of the request, the FAA released a list of the names of all public and private entities that have applied for authorizations to fly UAVs domestically. Some of these government licenses belong to the U.S. Customs and Border Protection, a component of the Department of Homeland Security. UAVs have been used by the CBP to patrol United States borders since 2005, and the agency owned ten UAVs as of 2012, with plans to use drones armed with non-lethal weaponry.

A May 2012, report issued by the DHS Inspector General found that CBP "needs to improve planning of its unmanned aircraft systems program to address its level of operation, program funding, and resource requirements, along with stakeholder needs". Also, despite the Bureau’s limited mission to safeguard the borders, the Bureau often flies missions for the FBI, the Department of Defense, NOAA, local law enforcement, and other agencies. In December 2011, the CBP made headlines when reporters discovered that the agency's UAVs were being used to assist local law enforcement in relation to cattle raiding in North Dakota without receiving prior approval from the FAA or any other agency.

Individuals in the United States have few legal privacy protections from aerial surveillance conducted through UAVs. In Florida v. Riley, the United States Supreme Court held that individuals do not have the right to privacy from police observation from public airspace. The weakness of legal protection from UAV surveillance have led to calls from civil liberties advocacy groups for the U.S. government to issue laws and regulations that establish both privacy protections and greater transparency regarding the use of UAVs to gather information about individuals.

As an example, the American Civil Liberties Union warned of a "nightmare scenario" in the future where the police might be able, with computer technology, to combine mobile phone tracking with video data and build up a database of people's routine daily movements.

On 24 February 2012, the Electronic Privacy Information Center, joined by over 100 organizations, experts, and members of the public, submitted a petition to the FAA requesting a public rule-making on the privacy impact of UAV use in U.S. airspace. In June 2012, Senator Rand Paul and Representative Austin Scott both introduced legislation that would require law enforcement to obtain a warrant before using a UAV to conduct surveillance of criminal activities. EPIC has stated that transparency and accountability must be built into the FAA's system of UAV regulation in order to provide basic protections to the public.

While Congress rapidly moves ahead to authorize further use of domestic UAVs, many remain skeptical regarding privacy concerns. Some privacy scholars argue that the domestic use of UAVs for surveillance will ultimately benefit privacy by encouraging society to demand greater privacy rights.

Associated today with the theatre of war, the widespread domestic use of drones for surveillance seems inevitable. Existing privacy law will not stand in its way. It may be tempting to conclude on this basis that drones will further erode our individual and collective privacy. Yet the opposite may happen. Drones may help restore our mental model of a privacy violation. They could be just the visceral jolt society needs to drag privacy law into the twenty-first century.

— Ryan Calo

FBI Director Robert Mueller testified before the Senate Judiciary Committee on 19 June 2013 that the FBI owns and utilizes UAVs for surveillance purposes.

In 2014, the California State Senate passed rules imposing strict regulations on how law enforcement and other government agencies can use drones. The legislation would require law enforcement agencies to obtain a warrant before using an unmanned aircraft, or drone, except in emergencies.

In January 2020, the United States Department of the Interior decided to ground around 800 DJI drones over security concerns. In October that same year, the United States Department of Justice banned the use of agency funds to acquire drones and other unmanned aerial systems "from foreign groups deemed threats", including DJI.

In January 2026, aerial drones were used at the Hilton Worldwide anti-ICE protests.

In May 2026, aerial drones were used at the Delaney Hall protests.

The US border patrol has been using drones for a very long time. The drones usually patrol the southern border.

=== United Arab Emirates ===
Police in the UAE have used drones to detect crime, monitor traffic and to ensure that people are obeying Covid restrictions.

=== United Kingdom ===
In 2007, Merseyside Police was reported to be conducting tests with a UAV. Merseyside Police caught a car thief with a UAV in 2010, but had to stop UAV operations a week later as the UAV was not licensed. Regulations introduced at the start of 2010 required any aerial surveillance by unmanned aircraft—no matter the size of the drone—to be licensed.

A license was eventually granted by the Civil Aviation Authority, but the UAV was lost soon after during a training exercise in Aigburth, Liverpool, when it crashed in the River Mersey. Police stated the UAV would not be replaced due to operational limitations and the cost of staff training.

In March 2014, Sussex Police announced a pilot project using an Aeryon Skyranger for three months at Gatwick Airport. The project was funded by the Association of Chief Police Officers to test the effectiveness of the technology in policing. The equipment cost £35,000 with the training of four police officers costing £10,000. In October 2014 it was reported that five English police forces (Merseyside, Staffordshire, Essex, Wiltshire and West Midlands) had obtained or operated unmanned aerial vehicles for observation.

== See also ==
- Outside unpermitted gatherings during COVID-pandemic
- Facial recognition system
- Government by algorithm
