= Mampong Technical College of Education =

- Established: 1967
- Affiliations: Government of Ghana
- Location: Mampong (Ashanti), Mampong Municipal District, AM0024, Ghana; 7.05752°N 1.39069°W
- Language: English
- Region Zone: Ashanti; Ashanti / Brong Ahafo
- Short name: Mamtech
- Source: An Atlas of The Forty Colleges of Education in Ghana.

Mampong Technical College of Education is a teacher education college in Mampong (Ashanti) (Mampong Municipal District, Ashanti Region, Ghana). The college is located in Ashanti / Brong Ahafo zone. It is one of the about 40 public colleges of education in Ghana. The college participated in the DFID-funded T-TEL programme. It was established in 1967 as an institution to train teachers at the same location as the Trade Training Centre, which was set up by the British Colonial Government in 1922. It attained tertiary level status in 2007 and was renamed Mampong Technical Teachers College of Education.

== History ==
Mampong Technical Teachers’ College of Education (MAMTECH) was established in 1967 as a teacher Educational institution on the premises of the Trade Training Centre which was established by the British Colonial Government in 1922. This Trade Training Centre turned into Borstal Institute for Juveniles (Boys Correction Home) in 1937. It was converted into Army Recruitment Camp during the World War II. From 1945 to 1960 it was change into Government Trade School. Between 1960 and 1967 it was run as Junior Technical Institute. The first principal of the college was Mr. W.J. Merry who until his appointment as a principal was the Head of the Junior Technical Institute which was converted into Handicraft Teacher Training Institute. The Institute was renamed Technical Teachers’ Institute in 1969. In 1976, it changed in Technical Teachers’ College. The college was given accreditation to the tertiary level of education in October, 2007. With the change in status, it was renamed Mampong Technical Teachers College of Education.

In 1967, when the college was established, it offered the 5-year Handicraft Teacher's Certificate “A”. In 1976, the 3-year Post Secondary programme was introduced in the college. In September 2004, the 3-year Diploma in Basic Education programme was introduced with Technical Skills as an area of specialization. Products of the college can teach Mathematics. Science, ICT and, English, in Basic Schools aside their specialized areas. Apart from the regular programme, the college runs a 4- year Diploma in Basic Education sandwich course for untrained teachers in Sekyere West and Nkoranza Districts. The performance of students presented, at the 3-year Certificate ‘A’ Post Secondary examinations over the years has been very encouraging.

The college has a great track record in the field of sports, having retained a hockey championship trophy and emerging football and cross-country champions at the Ashanti-Brong/Ahafo Teacher Training College Games (ASHBA Games) in 2006.

The college currently, has an all-male enrolment of 620 and in terms of social commitment, students of the college were adjudged the best in blood donation among all tertiary institutions in the country in 2005.

List of principals
Names	Years served
Mr. W.J. Merry	1967 – 1970
Cpt. F.W. Micah	1970 - 1976
Mr. Solomon Addai	1976 – 1977
Mr. S.T. Offei	1977 – 1979
Mr. Joe Alex Offei	1979 – 1998
Mr. Bertinus Bagbin(Ag)	1998 – 2000
Mr. L.Y. Amuzu	2000 – 2007
Ms. Margaret Opoku	2007 –
