= Mendelssohn (crater) =

Crater on Mercury

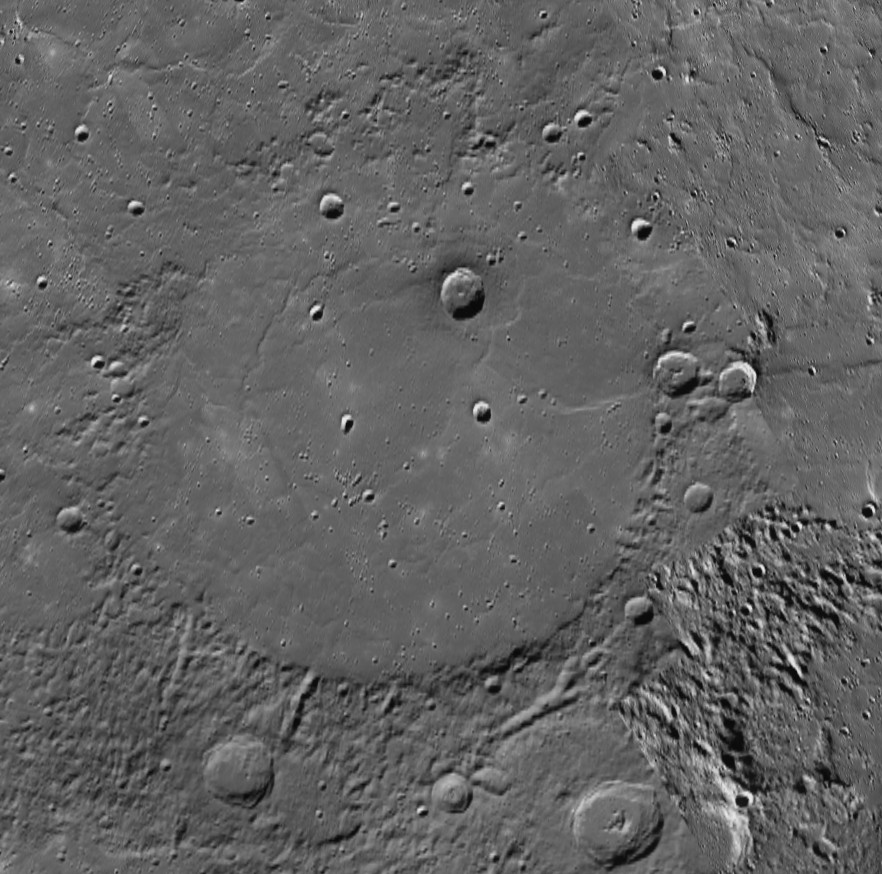
- MESSENGER WAC mosaic
- Planet: Mercury
- Coordinates: 70.31°N 257.68°W
- Quadrangle: Borealis
- Diameter: 291 km (181 mi)
- Eponym: Jakob Ludwig Felix Mendelssohn

Mendelssohn is a crater on Mercury. Its name was adopted by the International Astronomical Union (IAU) on April 24, 2012. Mendelssohn is named for the German composer Jakob Ludwig Felix Mendelssohn.

The floor of Mendelssohn is covered by smooth plains materials which are created by extrusive volcanism.

A confirmed dark spot is present in north-central Mendelssohn, around a crater of 19 km diameter. The crater excavated low reflectance material (LRM). Hollows are present within the crater.

On the east rim of Mendelssohn is the crater Berry.

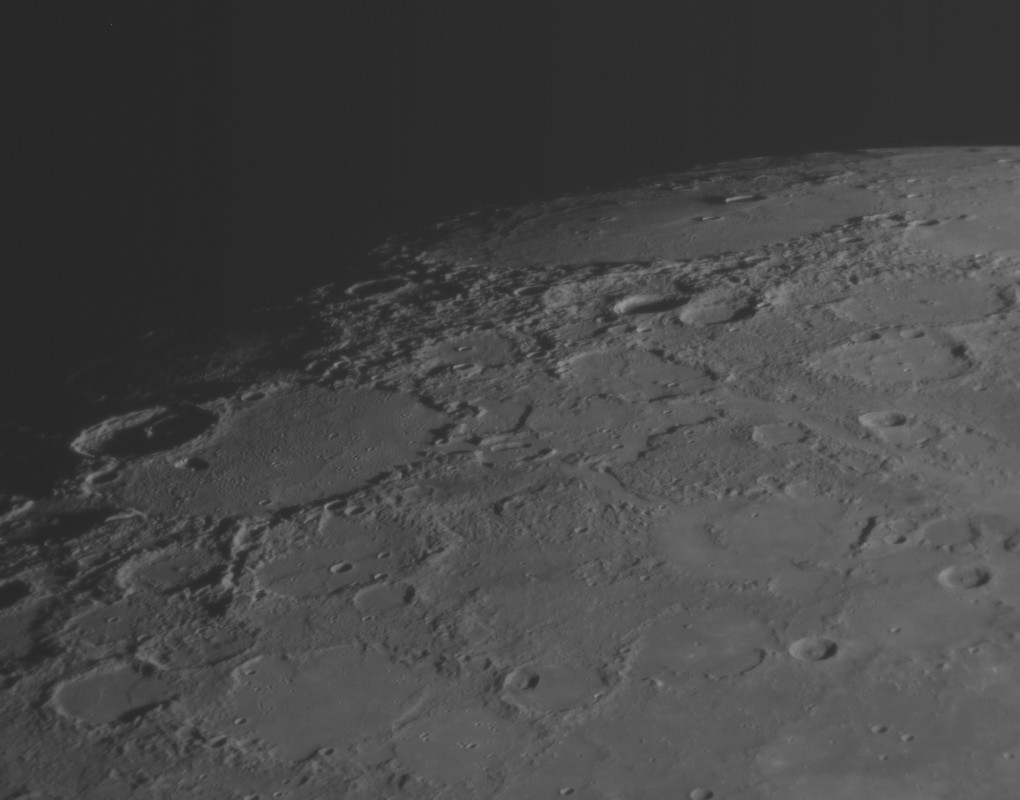
Oblique view of Mendelssohn and Kofi craters from MESSENGER's first flyby in January 2008

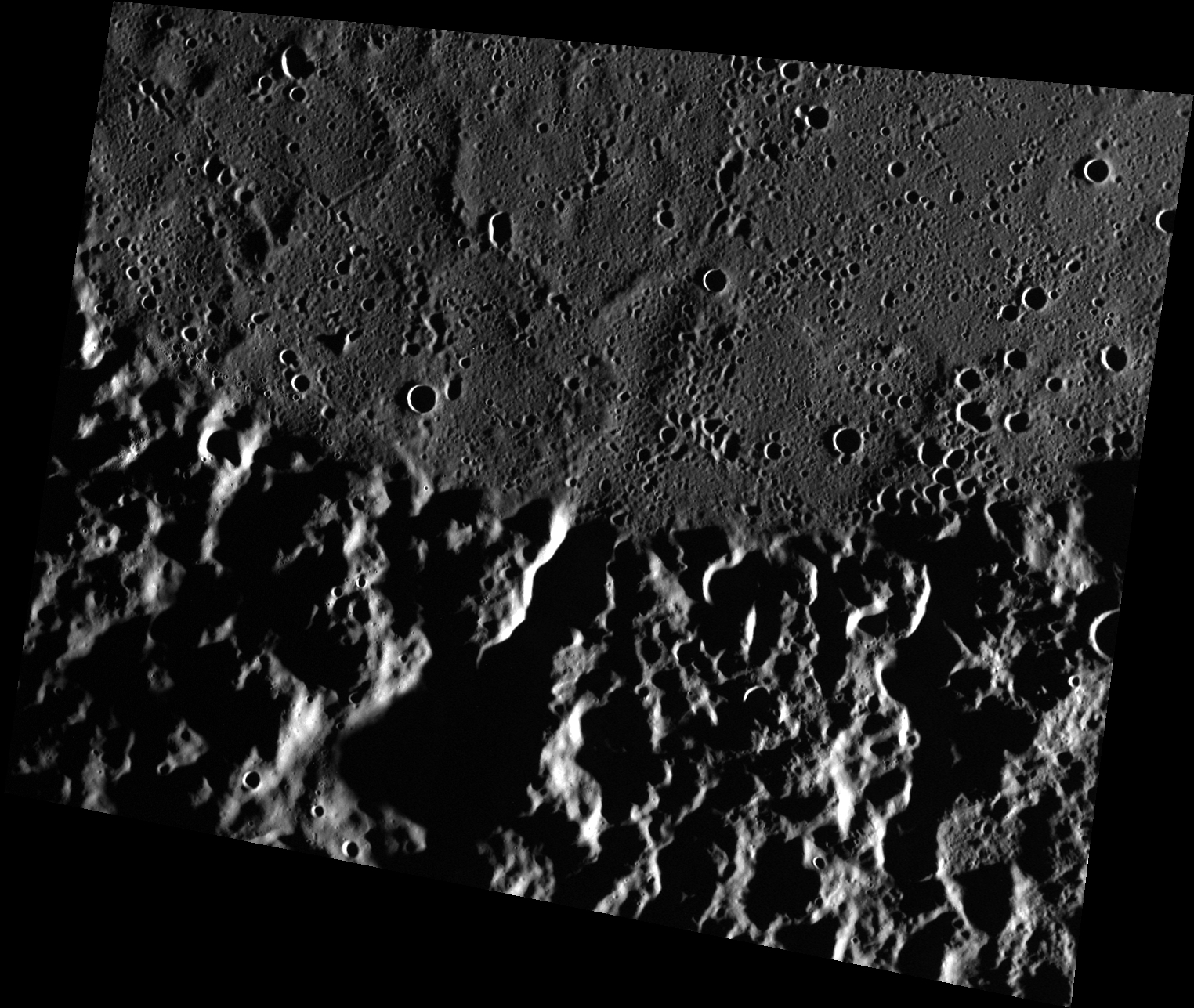
Southern rim of Mendelssohn crater

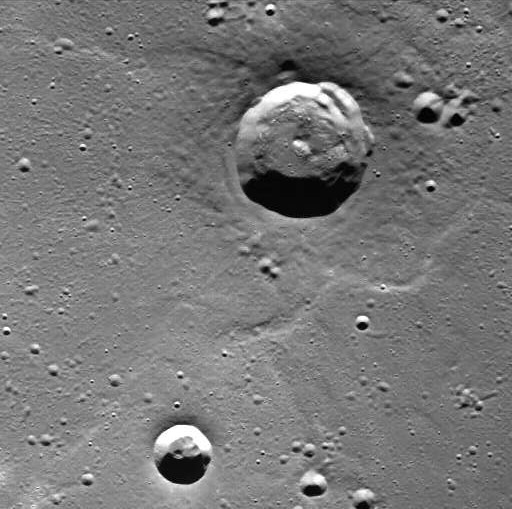
Mendelssohn crater interior. The crater at top is associated with a dark spot and contains hollows

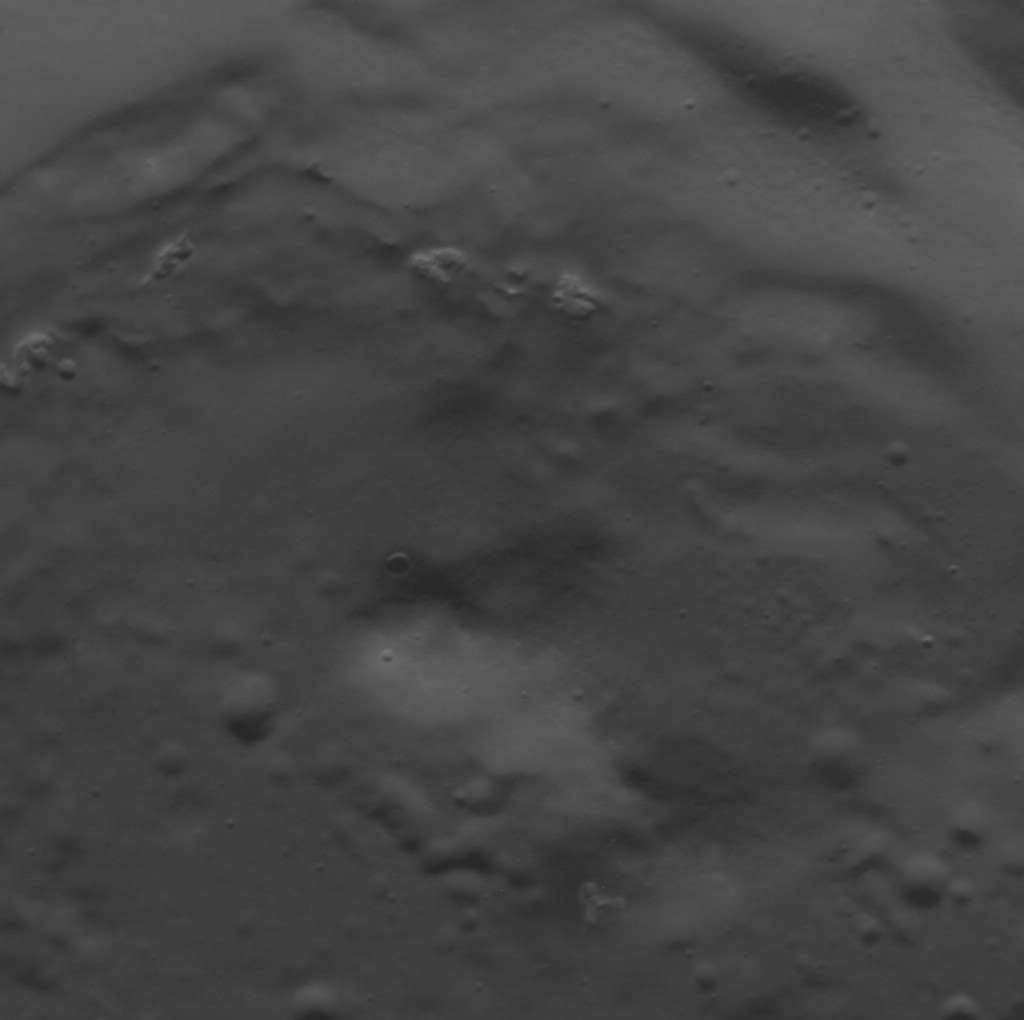
Hollows within the crater
