= Berry (crater) =

Crater on Mercury

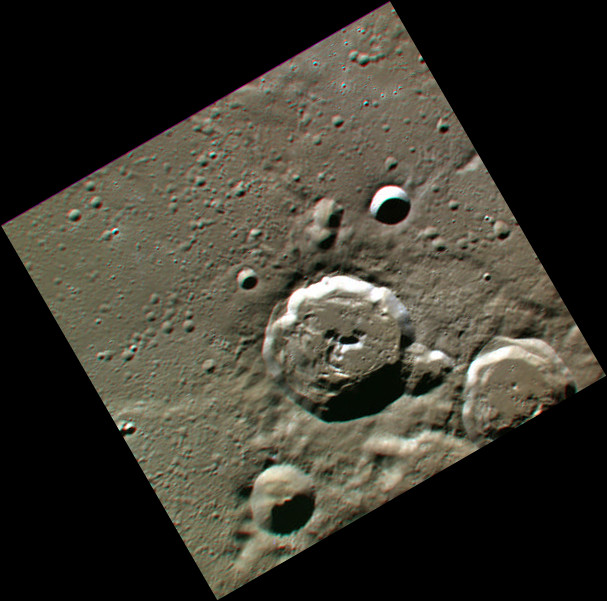
- MESSENGER approximate color image of Berry
- Feature type: Central-peak impact crater
- Location: Borealis quadrangle, Mercury
- Coordinates: 70.57°N 247.27°W
- Diameter: 25 km
- Eponym: Chuck Berry

Berry is a crater on Mercury. Its name was adopted by the International Astronomical Union (IAU) on September 28, 2020. Berry is named for the American singer and songwriter Chuck Berry.

Berry lies on the eastern edge of the much larger Mendelssohn crater.

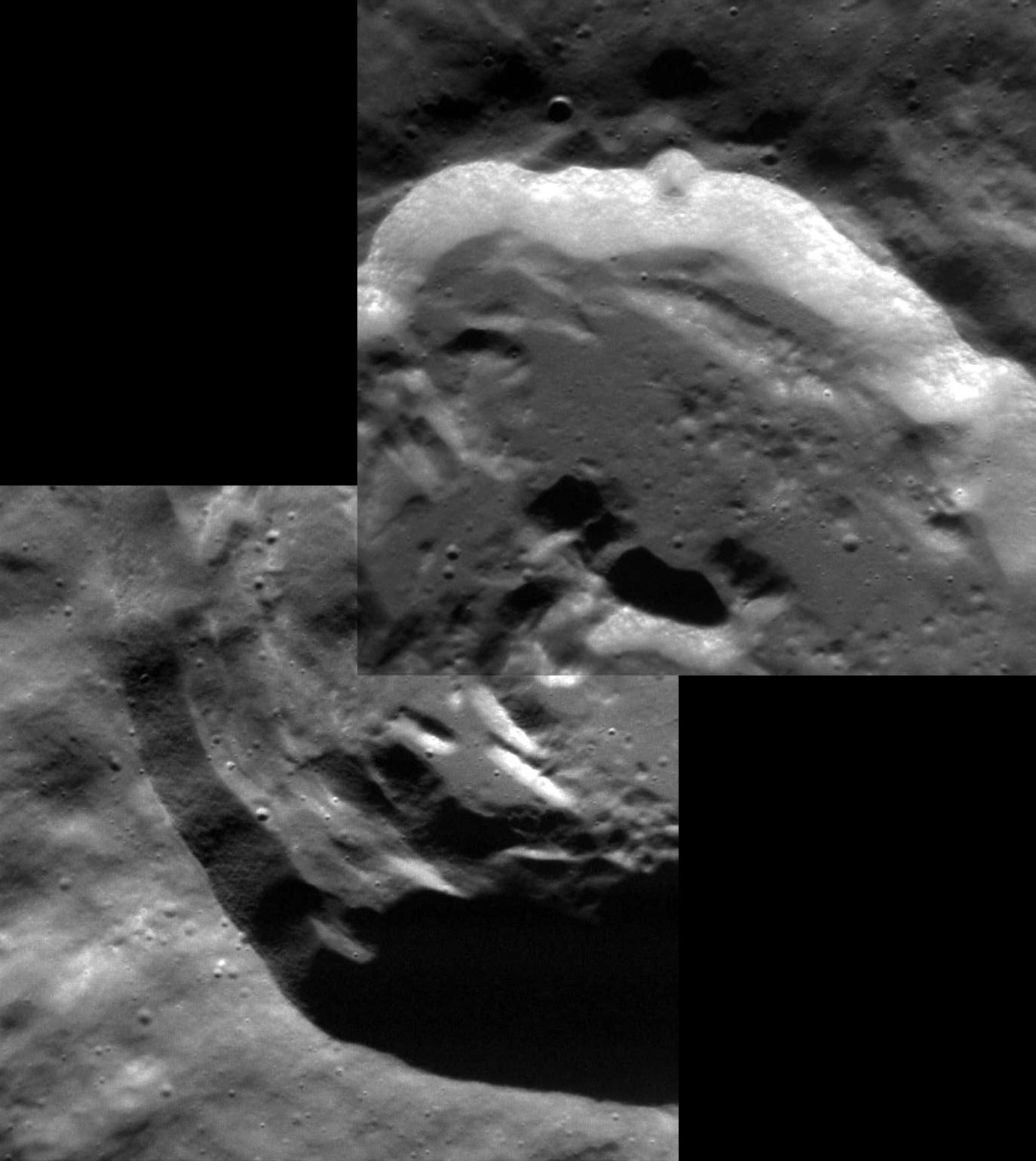
Detail of Berry crater
