= Vincent Kofi =

Ghanaian artist (1923–1974)

Vincent Akwete Kofi (1923–1974) was a Ghanaian artist and academic known for his modernist sculpture, which was inspired by themes such as Pan-Africanism and decolonization. He was described as "Ghana's most important sculptor".

== Early life and education ==
Vincent Akwete Kofi was born in Odumasi-Krobo, Ghana on 16 January 1923.

He trained at Achimota College, which had the first and foremost art department in West Africa.

He also studied at the Royal College of Art, London (1952–1955), and attended Columbia University, New York (1959). During his time in America, he visited the Barnett-Aden Gallery and its founder Alonzo Aden. He was painted by painter Alex Fournier.

While in New York, he learned metal casting and, with the assistance of the Harmon Foundation, produced a film on bronze casting.

== Career and experience ==
Kofi's works were exhibited around Africa and Europe. He worked primarily in wood and his works drew upon the cultural traditions of Ghana's past.

When Kofi returned to Ghana he taught at the Winneba Teacher Training College (1961–1969) and was Head of Fine Art at the College of Art, Kwame Nkrumah University of Science and Technology (KNUST) Kumasi (1969–1974).

Sculptures such as Awakening Africa, Crucifix and Blackman's Stoicism were influenced by Kofi's interest in Pan-Africanism and decolonization.

Kofi and Ghanaian textile artist Charlotte Hagan co-owned the Kofhag Art Mart gallery and studio.

Kofi was a member of the Ghanaian delegation at the First World Festival of Negro Arts, Dakar, 1966, and in 1971 he visited India at the invitation of the Government.

== Influence ==
The work of Felix Eboigbe has been influenced by Kofi's sculptural dynamism. El Anatsui was influenced in his early years by Kofi, and others such as Oku Ampofo and Kofi Antubam, in their rejection of foreign influences and turn towards indigenous art forms.

According to US Government officials, Kofi was the Ghanaian artist who was best known internationally in the 1970s.

== Personal life ==
Kofi married Felicia Korkor Djabatey (before 1946), in Krobo, Kwaebibirem, Eastern, Ghana. They gave birth to a daughter Janet Ayerko Kofi. Kofi died on 31 July 1974.
