= Nana Osei Bonsu II =

Regent of the Kingdom of Ashanti (1939–2025)

- Mampongmanhene of Mampong Asante Krontihene

Regent of the Asante Kingdom
- Reign: 25 February 1999 – 26 April 1999
- Coronation: 25 February 1999
- Predecessor: Opoku Ware II
- Born: 31 December 1939; Mampong, Ashanti
- Died: 20 April 2025 (aged 85); Mampong, Ashanti Region, Ghana
- Spouse: Janet Dorothy Owusu-Sechere, eldest child of the late JH Owusu-Sechere, Commissioner of Police CID/Special Branch
Names
- Daasebre Nana Osei Bonsu II
- House: Bretuo Dynasty
- Father: Kessie
- Mother: Mary Gyimah

Daasebre Nana Osei Bonsu II (born Saint Oswald Gyimah-Kessie; 31 December 1939 – April 2025) served as the regent of the Kingdom of Ashanti from 25 February 1999 to 26 April 2025. Osei Bonsu II was the Mamponghene as well as the krontihene of Asante (Duke of the Ashanti-Mampong Municipality).

== Biography ==
=== Early life and education ===
Osei Bonsu II was educated at Prempeh College and at the University of Ghana, where he graduated in 1972 with a BA in economics, political science and modern history. Osei Bonsu II became the registrar of the Kwame Nkrumah University of Science and Technology, Ashanti, in 1991.

On 28 April 2025, it was announced that he had died at the age of 86.

== See also ==
- Rulers of the Kingdom of Ashanti
- Kingdom of Ashanti
