= Gansevoort Mansion =

Historic house in New York, United States

- U.S. National Register of Historic Places
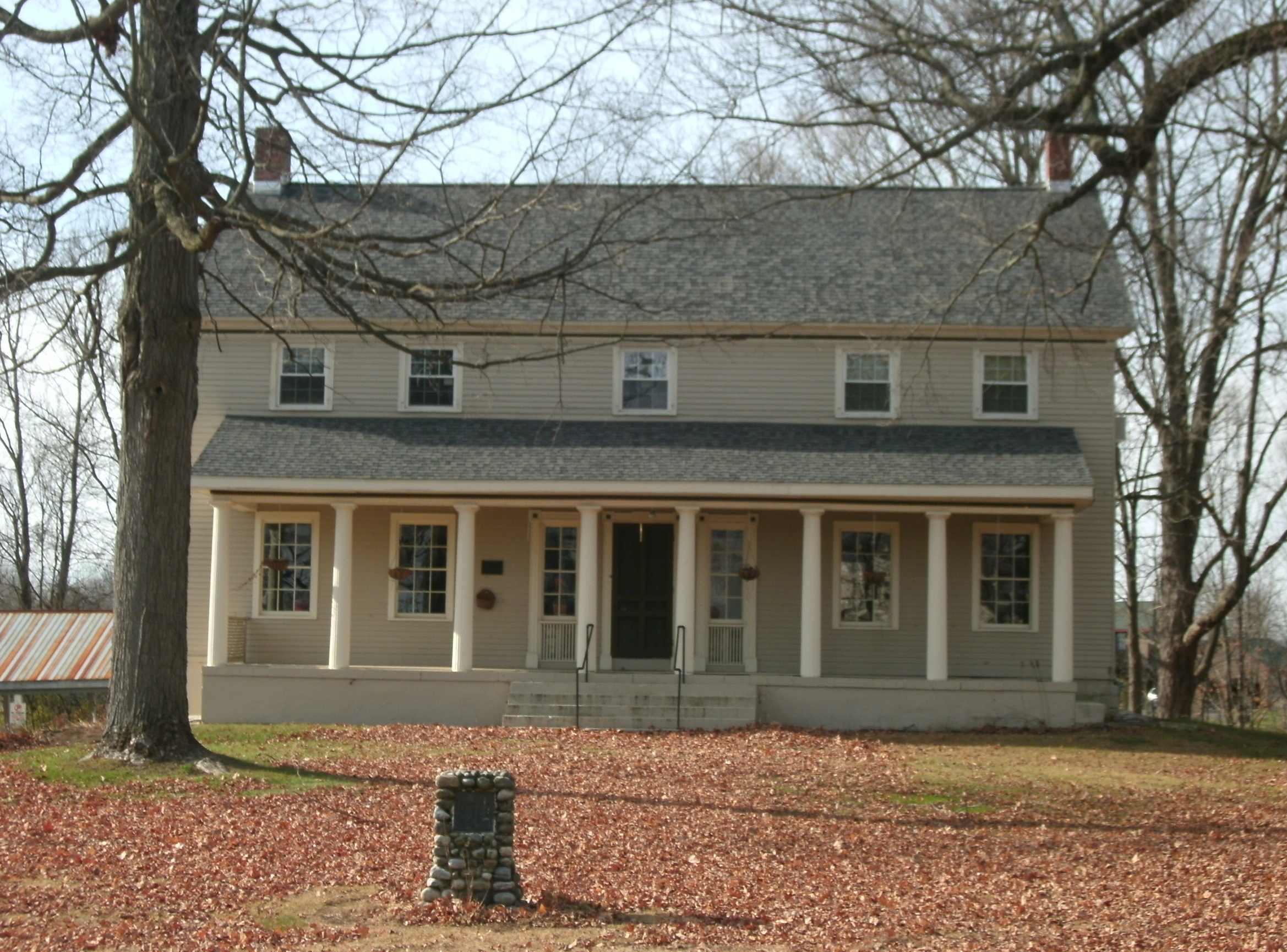
- Gansevoort Mansion, November 2010

- Location within New York Location within the United States
- Location: Off NY 32, Gansevoort, New York
- Coordinates: 43°11′48″N 73°39′13″W
- Area: 1 acre (0.40 ha)
- Built: 1813
- Architectural style: Colonial, Dutch Colonial
- NRHP reference No.: 76001272
- Added to NRHP: June 23, 1976

Gansevoort Mansion is a historic home located at Gansevoort in Saratoga County, New York. It was built in 1813 and is two-story, five-bay rectangular building with a gable roof and central entrance. It features a front verandah with fluted Doric order columns. It was once used as a Masonic Lodge. It was built by Herman Gansevoort (1779–1862), son of General Peter Gansevoort (1749–1812) and uncle of the American novelist Herman Melville. It is now operated as an inn and cafe.

It was added to the National Register of Historic Places in 1976.
