= Kofi (crater) =

Crater on Mercury

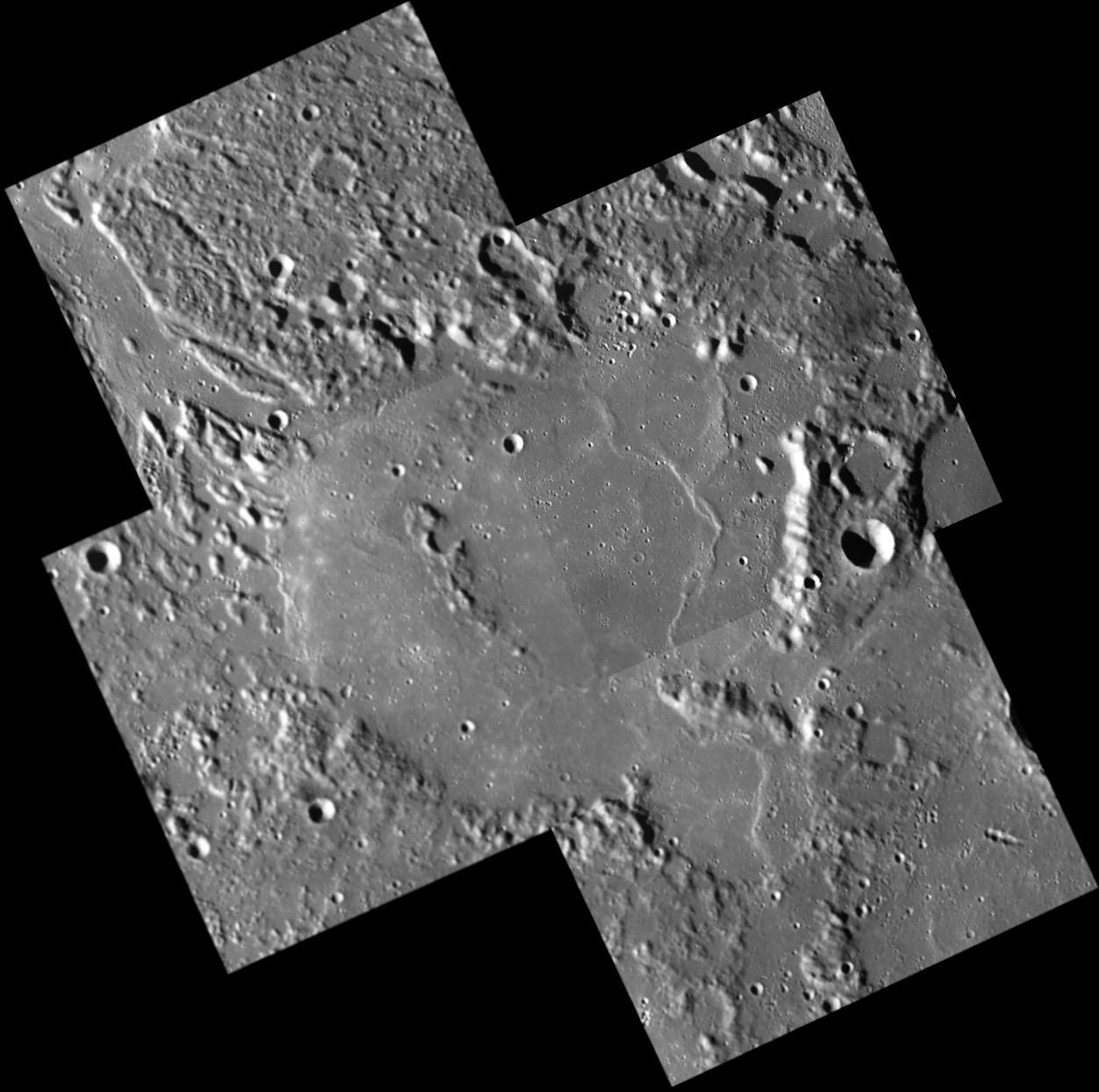
- MESSENGER WAC mosaic
- Planet: Mercury
- Coordinates: 56.75°N 117.87°E
- Quadrangle: Raditladi
- Diameter: 136 km (85 mi)
- Eponym: Vincent Kofi

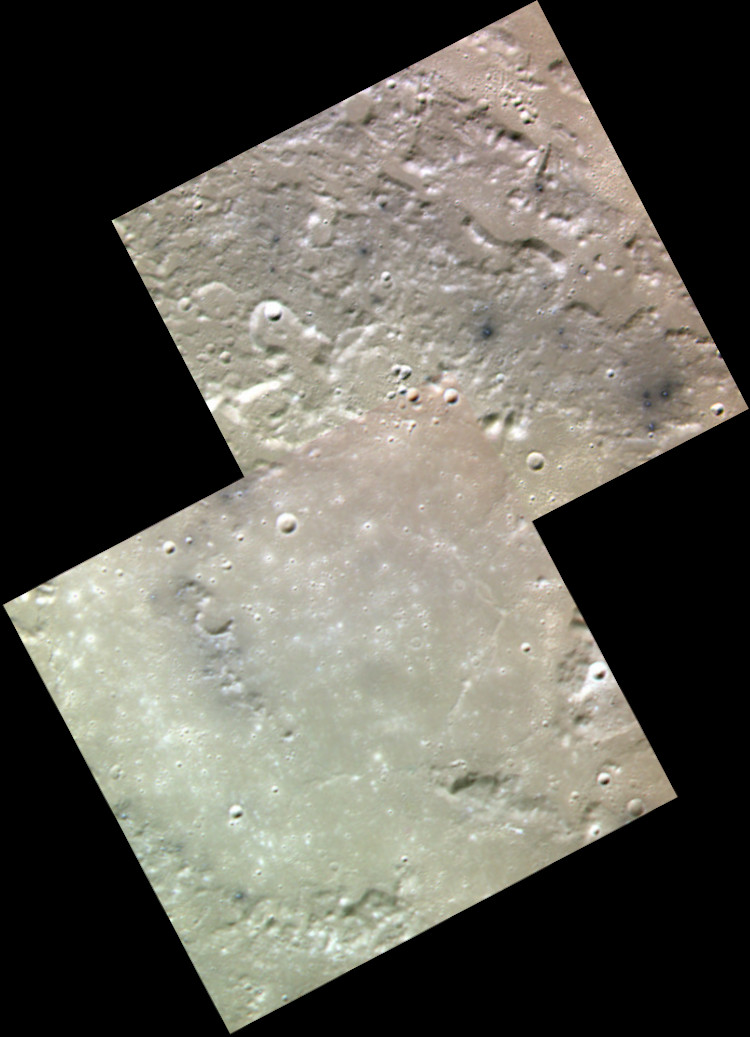
Part of Kofi crater in exaggerated color. Some small dark spots are visible in upper right.

Kofi is a crater on Mercury. It has a diameter of 136 kilometres (85 miles). Its name was adopted by the International Astronomical Union (IAU) on April 24, 2012. Kofi is named for the Ghanaian sculptor Vincent Kofi.

Kofi is one of 110 peak ring basins on Mercury. Most of the peak ring has been covered by lava.

A number of dark spots are present to the east and northeast of Kofi crater. The dark spots are associated with hollows.
