= Dutch Reformed Church of Gansevoort =

Historic church in New York, United States

- U.S. National Register of Historic Places
- Location within New York Location within the United States
- Location: 10 Catherine St., Gansevoort, New York
- Coordinates: 43°11′56″N 73°39′6″W
- Area: 2 acres (0.81 ha)
- Built: 1840; 186 years ago
- Architectural style: Greek Revival
- NRHP reference No.: 94001568
- Added to NRHP: January 20, 1995

Dutch Reformed Church of Gansevoort is a historic Dutch Reformed church at 10 Catherine Street in Gansevoort, Saratoga County, New York. It was built about 1840 and is a two-story, rectangular brick building on a cut-stone foundation in a vernacular Greek Revival style. It is topped by a moderately pitched, slate-covered gable roof. It features a wooden belfry with louvered openings topped with a pedimented gable roof. The church closed in the 1950s.

It was listed on the National Register of Historic Places in 1995, and was demolished in 1996.
