= Kwame Osei-Prempeh =

Ghanaian politician

Hon. Osei Prempeh Kwame

Member of Ghana Parliament for Nsuta-Kwamang-Beposo constituency
- In office 7 January 1997 – 6 January 2013

Personal details
- Born: 19 December 1957 (age 68) Kwamang, Ashanti Region
- Party: New Patriotic Party
- Children: 4
- Education: Kwame Nkrumah University of Science and Technology, KNUST
- Occupation: Politician
- Profession: Lawyer

Kwame Osei-Prempeh (born 19 December 1957) is a Ghanaian politician and a member of the Fifth Parliament of the Republic of Ghana representing the Nsuta-Kwamang-Beposo in the Ashanti Region of Ghana.

== Early life and education ==
Prempeh was born in Kwamang in Ashanti Region of the Ghana. He attended the Kwame Nkrumah University of Science and Technology and obtained his Degree in Bachelor of Social Science in 1982. He attended the University of Ghana in 1987 and studied Quantum Chemistry Laboratory, QCL. He also attended Ghana school of Law and obtained a Degree in Bachelor of Law in 1989.

== Career ==
Prempeh was an Associate for Sarpong Legal Services in Ashanti Region, Kumasi. He was also a member of Parliament for the Nsuta-Kwamang-Beposo constituency in the Ashanti Region of Ghana. He became the Acting Managing Director and Group Chief Executive of GOIL Company Limited on 3 June 2019, after being a board member since two years prior.

== Politics ==
Prempeh is a member of the New Patriotic Party. He was first elected into Parliament during the December 1996 Ghanaian general election on the Ticket of the New Patriotic Party. He polled 12,586 votes out of the 24,444 valid votes cast representing 51.5% against Thomas Fokuo Agyepong an NDC member who polled 10,313 representing 33.70%. He won the 2000 Ghanaian General Elections with 13,568 votes out of the 21,358 valid votes cast representing 63.50% against Ebenezer A. Frimpong Prempeh and NDC member, Osei O. Emmanuel an NRP member, Osei Kwadwo a CPP member, Salisu Muhammed a PNC member and Kofi A. Kankam a UGM member who polled 6,889 votes, 304 votes, 285 votes, 221 votes, 91 votes respectively. He polled 15,704 votes out of the 24,344 valid votes cast representing 64.50% against Samuel Otu an NDC member, E.O.Adu-Amankwaah a IND member and George Osei Owusu Amankwah a CPP member who polled 7,769, 547 and 324 votes respectively. He polled 17,403 votes out of the 24,879 valid votes cast representing 69.95% during the 2008 General Elections. He was defeated by Kwame Asafu-Adjei during the 2012 General Elections.

== Personal life ==
Prempeh is married with four children. He is a member of the Seventh-day Adventist Church.
