= Gansevoort, New York =

Gansevoort
- Hamlet
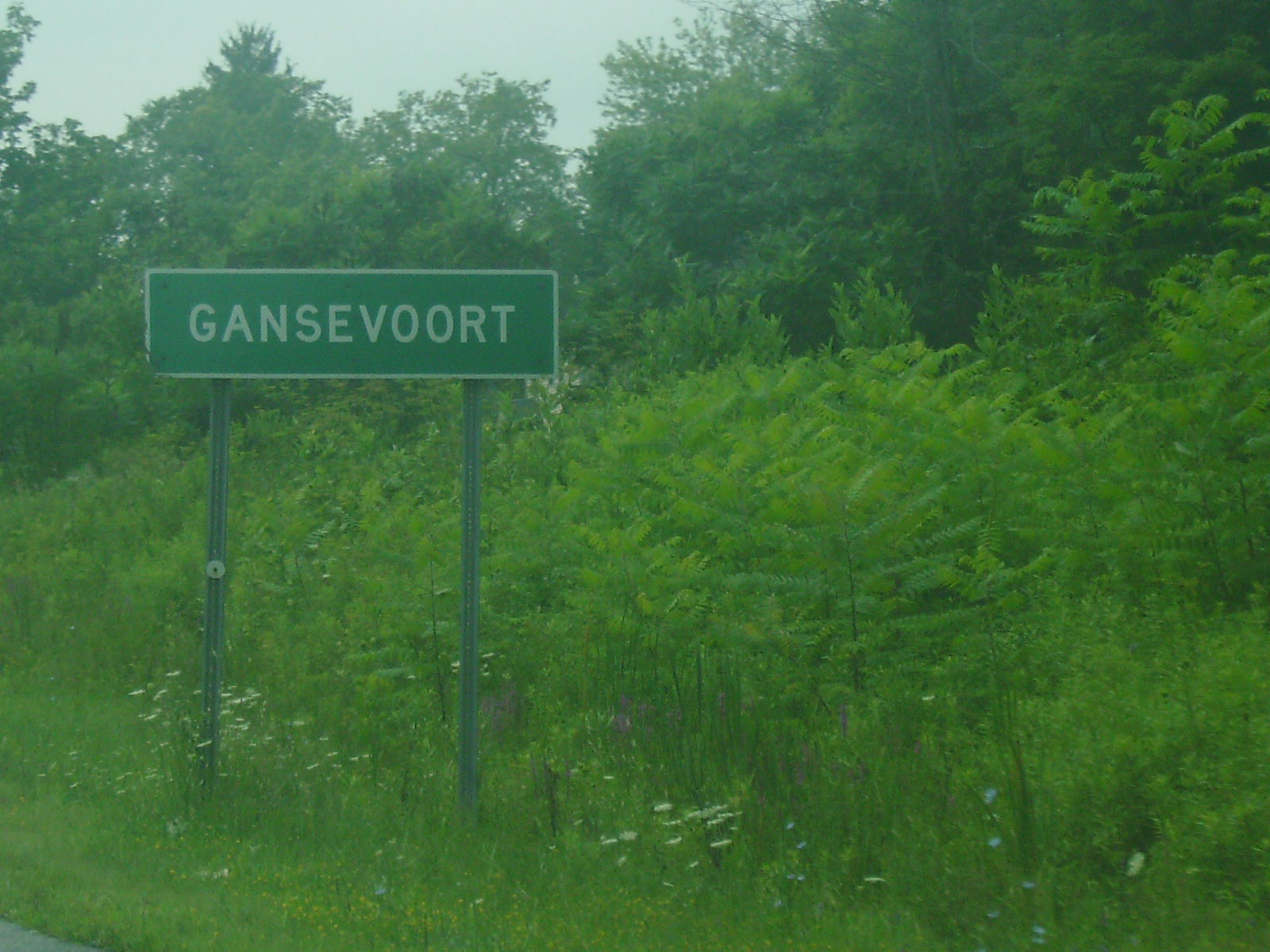
- Sign for Gansevoort, New York on New York State Route 32.

- Location within New York
- Coordinates: 43°11′43″N 73°39′0″W
- Country: United States
- State: New York
- County: Saratoga
- Town: Northumberland
- Named for: Peter Gansevoort
- Elevation: 240 ft (73 m)
- Time zone: UTC-5 (EST)
  - Summer (DST): UTC-4 (EDT)
- ZIP code: 12831
- Area code: 518

Gansevoort is a hamlet in the town of Northumberland in Saratoga County, New York, United States. The hamlet of Gansevoort is named for Peter Gansevoort, a hero in the siege of Fort Stanwix (Fort Schuyler) which contributed to the downfall of Burgoyne's army at the Battle of Saratoga during the Revolutionary War.

== History ==
Gansevoort was originally settled by the Mohawk and Iroquois Indians and many burial mounds and artifacts from this time can still be found in the area. White settlers moved in around the 1760s, brought in following military and hunting camps. The hamlet was an important stop on the Underground Railroad, given its proximity to Canada.

The Dutch Reformed Church of Gansevoort and Gansevoort Mansion are listed on the National Register of Historic Places.

== Demographics ==
No census data is available for the hamlet of Gansevoort.
