= Akrofonso =

Agona-Akrofonso
- Town
- Akrofonso
- Interactive map of Agona-Akrofonso
- Coordinates: 6°55′15″N 1°28′10″W
- Country: Ghana
- Administrative region: Ashanti
- District: Sekyere South
- Elevation 1,049: 319.74 m (1,049.0 ft)

Population
  - Total: 1,600
- Time zone: UTC+0 (GMT)

Agona-Akrofonso, sometimes called Akrofoso, is a town in the Sekyere South District in the Ashanti Region of Ghana, approximately 38 kilometres (24 mi) north-east of the Ashanti Regional capital, Kumasi, and about two miles east of Agona, the district capital. Agona-Akrofonso lies off the Kumasi-Mampong highway. The population is estimated to be about 1,600 inhabitants. It is at latitude 6°55'15.86"N and Longitude 1°28'10.61"W.

== People ==
The residents are primarily Ashantis, belonging to the Akan people and speaking the Twi language, although the language of business, commerce and education is English, as in all of Ghana. Since the 1980s, the population has increased and housing has expanded beyond the historic core.

== Infrastructure ==
Agona-Akrofonso is on the Ghana National Electricity Grid, and many homes have electricity.

There are several pending infrastructure development plans, including a 60-foot-high (18 m) potable water tank with a capacity of over 12,000 US gallons (45,400 L). There are several public wells where water is available for a fee (per bucket), although many homes have private wells.

Agona-Akrofonso had a soccer club, the Multi Stars, which once played in the third division of the Ghanaian league hierarchy but has become dormant.

== Education ==
The local government runs a kindergarten in Agona-Akrofonso that is not always fully attended by all eligible children. Reasons for poor attendance include poor health, parents' inability to provide supplies such as shoes, and the need for children to remain at home to help their parents. In addition, there is a primary and middle school called Junior High School. The school's buildings were built in 1942, and were later upgraded. Graduates of the junior high school typically attend high school in Sekyere South District, although many leave the area entirely to attend school in Kumasi, Accra, or other larger cities.

Early in 2012, Akrofonso began developing plans to develop the town, focusing in part on the junior high school. Some long-delayed school improvements are needed. Future phases will address potable water needs, hand-washing stations and a new school fence.

In 2016, the community renovated the junior high school, fixing the roofs and painting the building.

== Economy ==
Cocoa production is the primary occupation, and yams, cassava, poultry, plantains, cocoyams, and fruit are also important to the local economy.

== Government ==
On 12 February 2021, Nana Owusu Achaw Brempong was reëlected Ashanti Region Representative to the Ghana Council of State, receiving 77 of the 86 votes cast.

== Gallery ==
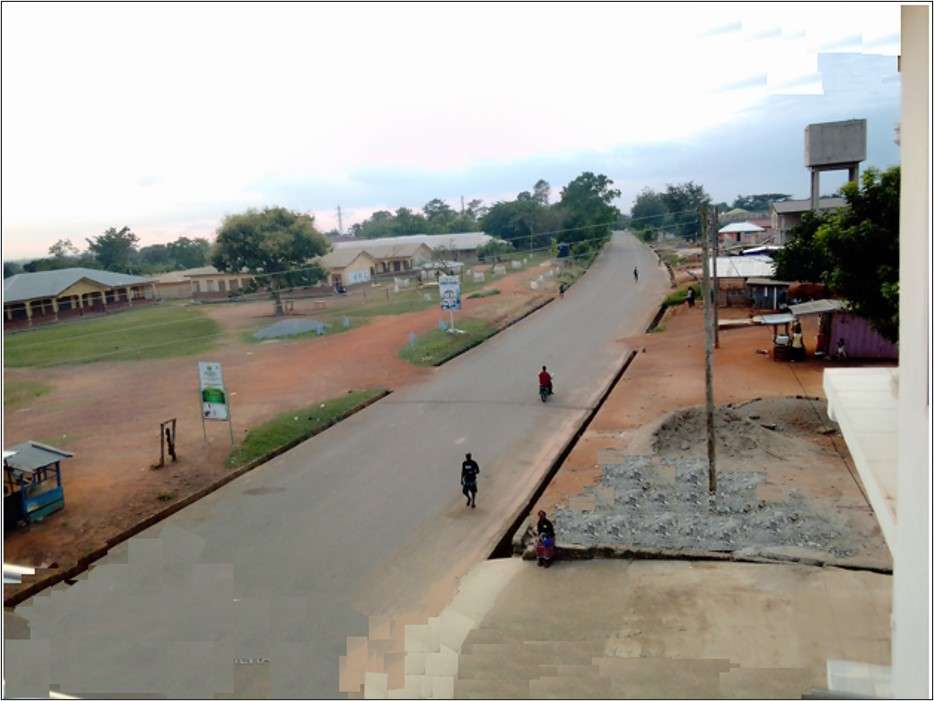
Agona Akrofonso – Westward to Agona

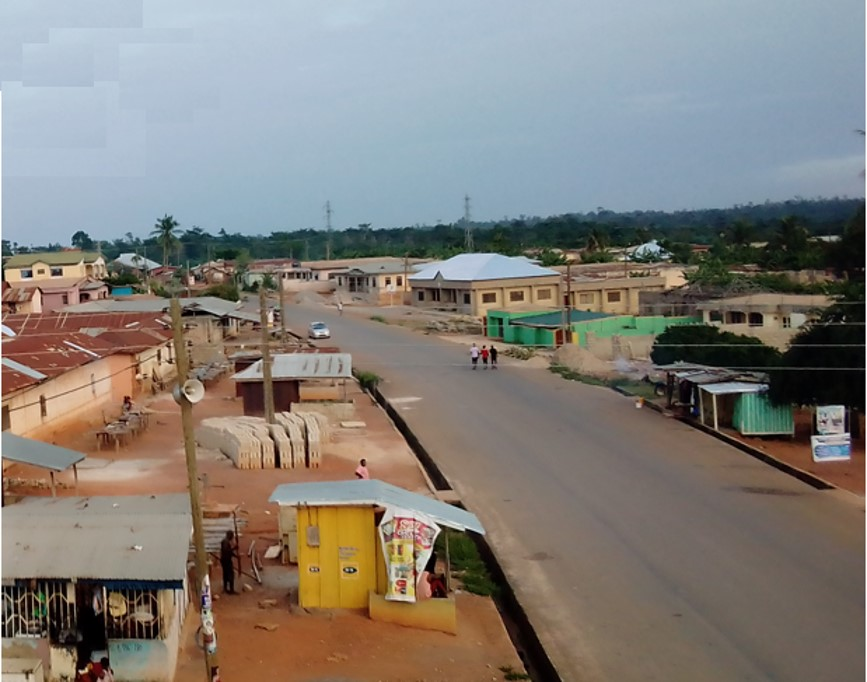
Agona Akrofonso – Looking Eastward Towards Asamang

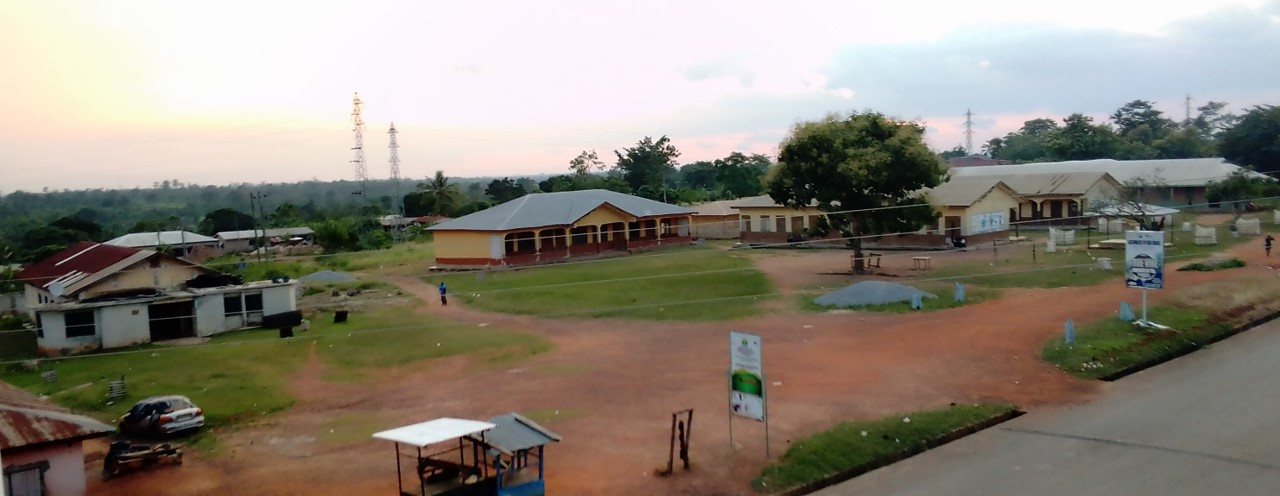
Agona Akrofonso – Looking Southwards Towards Schools

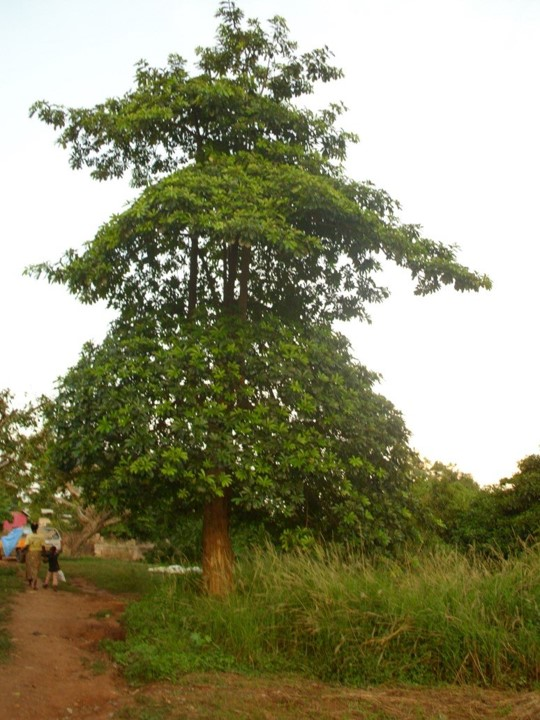
Nyame Dua – God's Tree in Akrofonso (South of School 2012)
