= St. Monica's College of Education =

Location
- BOX 250; Ashanti; Mampong; Ghana

Information
- Type: Public / Women only
- Established: 1930

St. Monica's College of Education is an educational college for girls in Mampong, Ghana established in 1930 in Cape Coast. It later moved to Mampong in the Ashanti Region in 1936 at the request of the Asantehene. It attained tertiary status in October 2007 and is affiliated to the University of Cape Coast.

== History ==
St. Monica's College of Education was Established in 1930. It was founded in Cape Coast by three religious sisters (Sr. Lailla, Sr. Dorothy, and Sr. Gertrude).

In 1936, at the request of Asantehene, the college was moved from Cape Coast to Mampong – Ashanti. The college has since gone through the following programmes: Certificate ‘A’ four-year course, two-year Certificate ‘B’ course, two-year Post ‘B, course, Specialist courses in Art and Business Education, two-year Certificate ‘A’ Post-Secondary and three-year Post-Secondary course. It started a three-year Diploma in Basic Education programme in 2004, and was given accreditation as a tertiary institution in October, 2007.

In December 2005, Open Distance Learning programme for untrained teachers was introduced in the college. The programme run for four years to upgrade untrained teachers for Diploma in Basic Education. In August 2007, a two-year Sandwich Diploma in Basic Education programme was also introduced for Certificate ‘A’ teachers. These residential programmes are offered for both sexes.

The college has an active parent-teacher association. The current student population of the college is 596. The teaching staff strength is 36, comprising 23 men and 13 women.

List of Principals of the college:
Name	Years served
Sr. Gladys O.H.P	1930-1942
Sr. Mabel O.H.P	1942-1947
Sr. Eileen O.H.P	1947-1951
Sr. Francis Clare O.H.P	1951-1954
Sr. Mary Dorothea O.H.P	1954-1955
Sr. Beatrice O.H.P	1955-1966
Sr. Nancye O.H.P	1966-1975
Mrs. Lucy Peprah-Tawiah	1975-1982
Miss Grace Ama Serwaa Hanson	1982-1988
Mrs. Agnes Ofosu-Koranteng	1988-2007
Mr. J. Ofei-Danquah (Ag.)	2007-
