= Northumberland, New York =

Northumberland
- Town
- Town of Northumberland
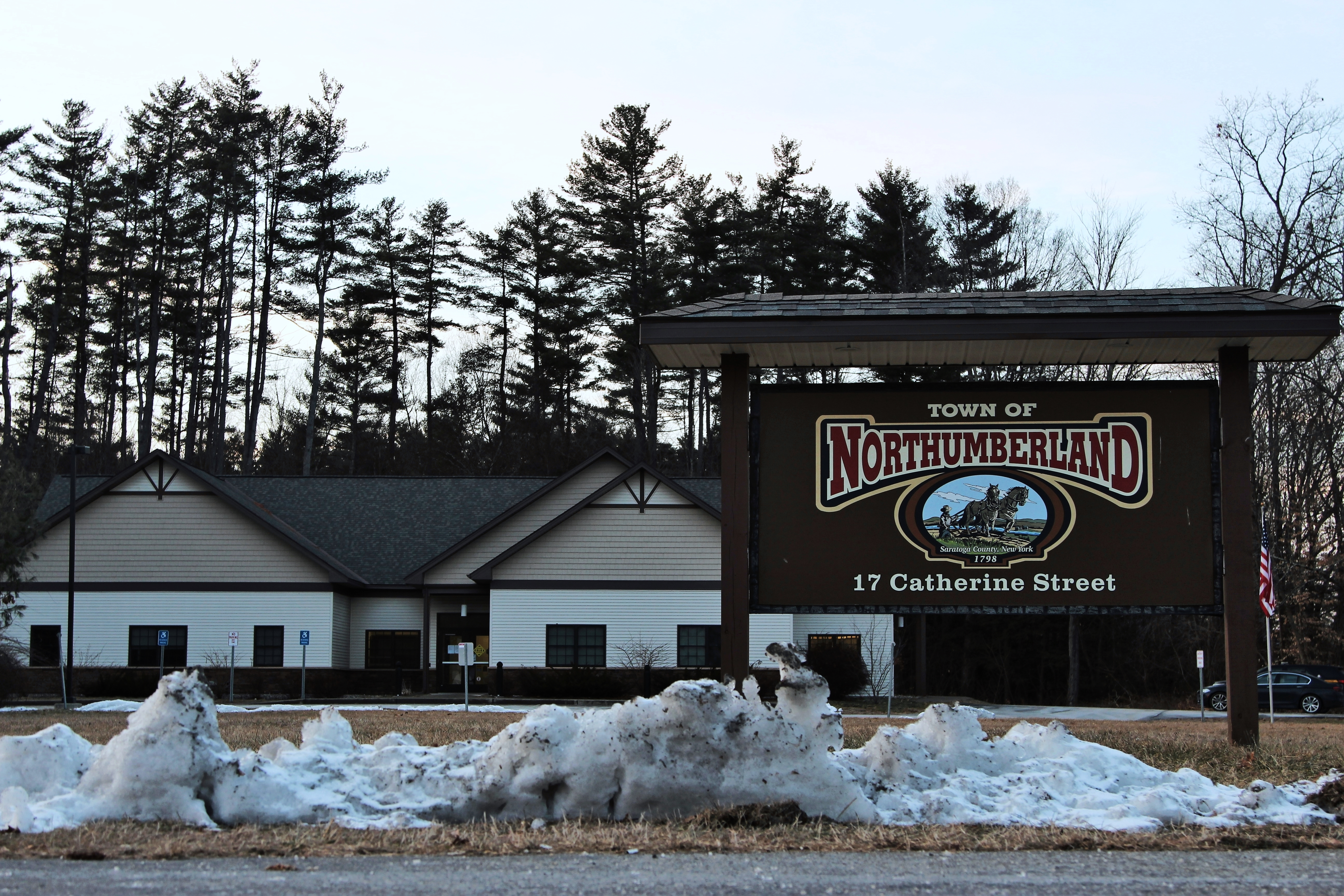
- Town hall

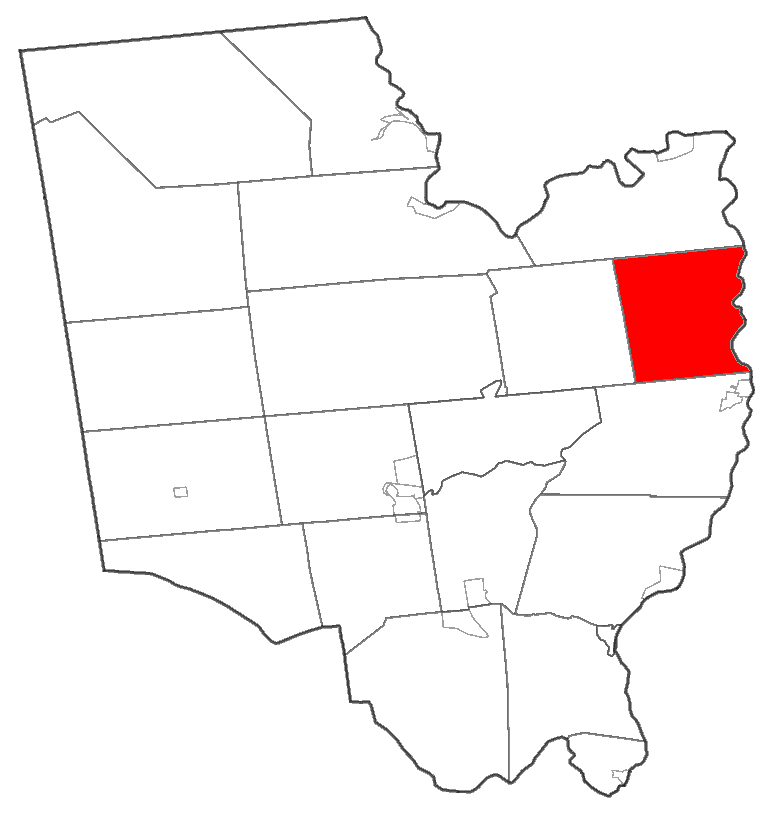
- Map highlighting Northumberland's location within Saratoga County.

- Location within the state of New York
- Coordinates: 43°10′11″N 73°37′58″W
- Country: United States
- State: New York
- County: Saratoga
- Named for: Northumberland, England

Area
  - Total: 32.92 sq mi (85.26 km^{2})
  - Land: 32.30 sq mi (83.65 km^{2})
  - Water: 0.62 sq mi (1.60 km^{2})
- Elevation: 282 ft (86 m)

Population (2020)
  - Total: 5,242
  - Density: 162.3/sq mi (62.67/km^{2})
- Time zone: UTC-5 (Eastern (EST))
  - Summer (DST): UTC-4 (EDT)
- ZIP code: 12831, 12866, 12871
- Area code: 518
- FIPS code: 36-53737
- GNIS feature ID: 0979294
- Website: Town of Northumberland

Northumberland is a town in Saratoga County, New York, United States. Immediately north of Schuylerville and northeast of Saratoga Springs the town is also located on the west bank of the Hudson River.

== Etymology ==
The name derives from Northumberland, a county in the United Kingdom.

== History ==
The area was first settled around 1765. Previously, it was in the territory of Mohican natives, who had two villages in the town.

During the Battle of Saratoga, Burgoyne's army crossed the Hudson from east to west in Northumberland, at a point where now can be found Hudson Crossing Park. From there, he headed south with the intent of capturing Albany.

The town was formed in 1798 from the Town of Saratoga. Parts of its territory were subsequently removed to form the new towns; Hadley (1801), Moreau (1805), and Wilton (1818).

The Champlain Canal was formally opened in 1823.

The Col. Sidney Berry House was listed on the National Register of Historic Places in 2003.

== Notable people ==
- Herman Melville, author, often visited his mother, Maria Gansevoort Melville, at her home in Northumberland.
- Peter Gansevoort commanded Fort Stanwix when it was besieged during the American Revolution.

== Geography ==
According to the United States Census Bureau, the town has a total area of 32.9 square miles (85 km^{2}), of which 32.3 square miles (84 km^{2}) is land and 0.6 square miles (1.6 km^{2}) (1.67%) is water.

The eastern town line is the border of Washington County and is marked by the Hudson River.

U.S. Route 4 is a north–south highway by the Hudson River at the southeastern corner of Northumberland. New York State Route 32 is a north–south highway that intersects New York State Route 50 at Gansevoort. US-4 and NY-32 are conjoined in Northumberland.

The town is located in the northern Hudson Valley, with the Hudson River forming the town's eastern border. The principal community, Gansevoort, is located in the north of the town. The town's terrain is broken up by small creeks, and hills. The Snook Kill River passes through the north of the town.

== Demographics ==
Historical population
| Census | Pop. | Note | %± |
|---|---|---|---|
| 1820 | 1,279 | | — |
| 1830 | 1,606 | | 25.6% |
| 1840 | 1,672 | | 4.1% |
| 1850 | 1,775 | | 6.2% |
| 1860 | 1,666 | | −6.1% |
| 1870 | 1,655 | | −0.7% |
| 1880 | 1,583 | | −4.4% |
| 1890 | 1,410 | | −10.9% |
| 1900 | 1,227 | | −13.0% |
| 1910 | 1,127 | | −8.1% |
| 1920 | 1,048 | | −7.0% |
| 1930 | 1,059 | | 1.0% |
| 1940 | 1,109 | | 4.7% |
| 1950 | 1,263 | | 13.9% |
| 1960 | 1,353 | | 7.1% |
| 1970 | 1,779 | | 31.5% |
| 1980 | 2,732 | | 53.6% |
| 1990 | 3,645 | | 33.4% |
| 2000 | 4,603 | | 26.3% |
| 2010 | 5,087 | | 10.5% |
| 2020 | 5,242 | | 3.0% |
U.S. Decennial Census

As of the census of 2000, there were 4,603 people, 1,593 households, and 1,264 families residing in the town. The population density was 142.3 inhabitants per square mile (54.9/km^{2}). There were 1,717 housing units at an average density of 53.1 per square mile (20.5/km^{2}). The racial makeup of the town was 98.09% White, 0.54% African American, 0.33% Native American, 0.28% Asian, 0.17% from other races, and 0.59% from two or more races. Hispanic or Latino of any race were 0.93% of the population.

There were 1,593 households, out of which 44.3% had children under the age of 18 living with them, 67.1% were married couples living together, 7.8% had a female householder with no husband present, and 20.6% were non-families. 14.5% of all households were made up of individuals, and 4.9% had someone living alone who was 65 years of age or older. The average household size was 2.88 and the average family size was 3.18.

In the town, the population was spread out, with 30.0% under the age of 18, 5.8% from 18 to 24, 36.6% from 25 to 44, 20.2% from 45 to 64, and 7.3% who were 65 years of age or older. The median age was 34 years. For every 100 females, there were 101.5 males. For every 100 females age 18 and over, there were 99.6 males.

The median income for a household in the town was $51,559, and the median income for a family was $53,523. Males had a median income of $36,964 versus $28,185 for females. The per capita income for the town was $19,104. About 4.8% of families and 6.2% of the population were below the poverty line, including 9.1% of those under age 18 and 2.1% of those age 65 or over.

== Communities and locations in Northumberland ==
- Bacon Hill – A hamlet northwest of Northumberland village. It is named after Ebenezer Bacon, an early settler, but was previously called "Fiddletown" and "Popes Corners."
- Callahans Corners – A hamlet south of Jewell Corner and located near the center of the town on NY-32.
- Gansevoort – A hamlet in the northern part of the town on NY-32. It is named after Peter Gansevoort.
- Griffin Island – An island in the Hudson River in the northeastern section of the town.
- Jewell Corner – A hamlet southeast of Gansevoort on NY-32.
- Northumberland – The hamlet of Northumberland is located at the junction of US-4 and NY-32, by the Hudson River.
- Starks Knob – A hamlet south of Northumberland village on US-4.
- Thompson Island – An island in the Hudson River, south of Griffin Island.
