= Dr. William E. and Ethel Rosenberger Berry House =

Historic house in Iowa, United States

- U.S. National Register of Historic Places
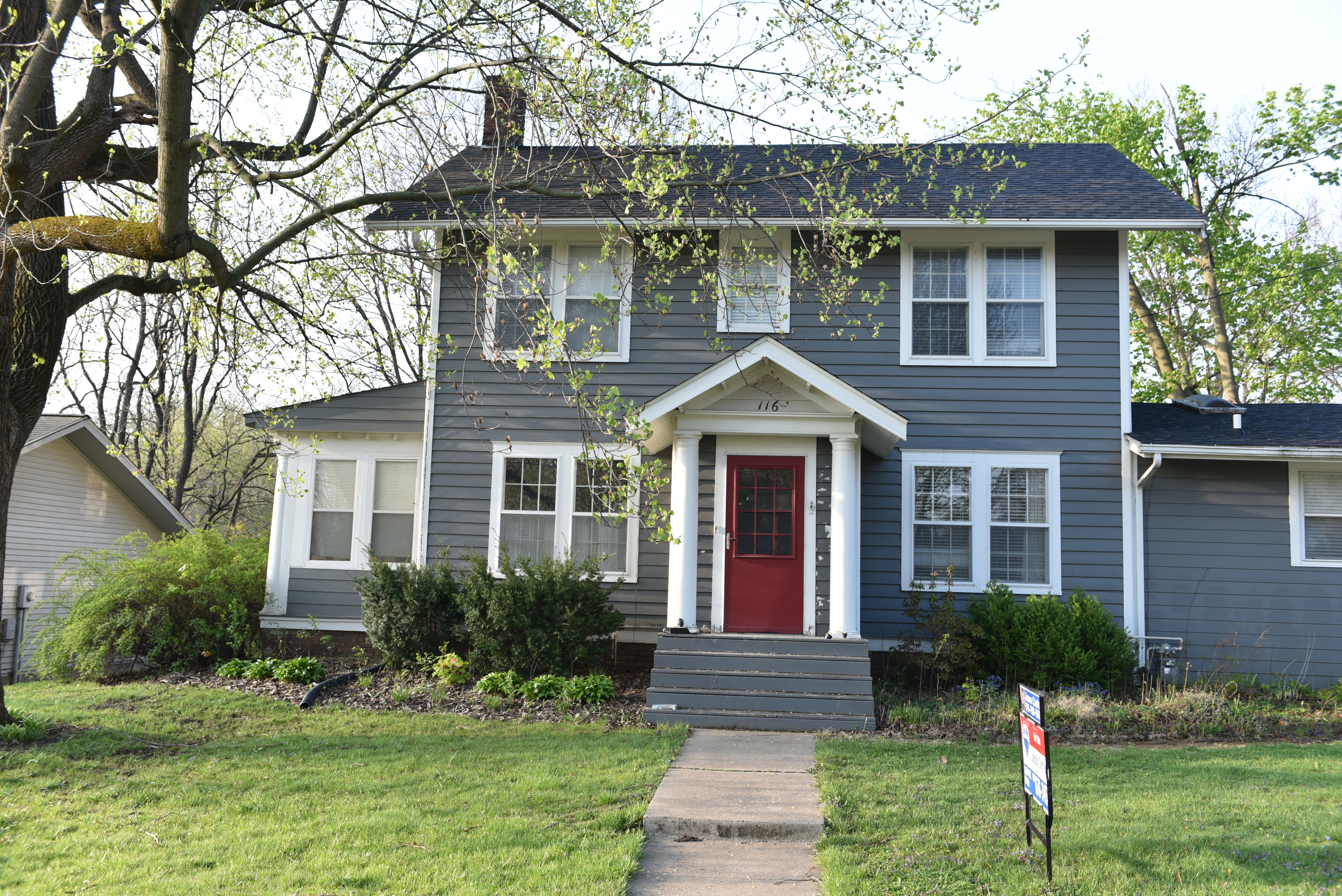

- Location within Iowa Location within the United States
- Location: 116 Rosenberger Ave. Oskaloosa, Iowa
- Coordinates: 41°18′21″N 92°38′48″W
- Area: less than one acre
- Built: 1924
- Built by: P.W. Sparks
- Architectural style: Colonial Revival
- MPS: Quaker Testimony in Oskaloosa MPS
- NRHP reference No.: 96000343
- Added to NRHP: March 29, 1996

The Dr. William E. and Ethel Rosenberger Berry House is a historic residence located in Oskaloosa, Iowa, United States. The Berry's were Quakers and members of the faculty of William Penn College. He taught classical languages and served as Dean, while she taught French. They were among the first to settle in the Penn College Addition. The college platted and sold these lots, which in turn helped the institution financially survive. The Berry's bought several lots, and built their house on one of them. Their Colonial Revival house was built in 1924 by P.W. Sparks, a local contractor. It is a two-story, frame, single-family dwelling that features a side-gable roof, an enclosed front porch, and a solarium. It is the Berry's association with the school in the context of the Quaker testimony in Oskaloosa that makes this house historic. The house was listed on the National Register of Historic Places in 1996.
