= Chuck Berry House =

Historic house in Missouri, United States

- U.S. National Register of Historic Places
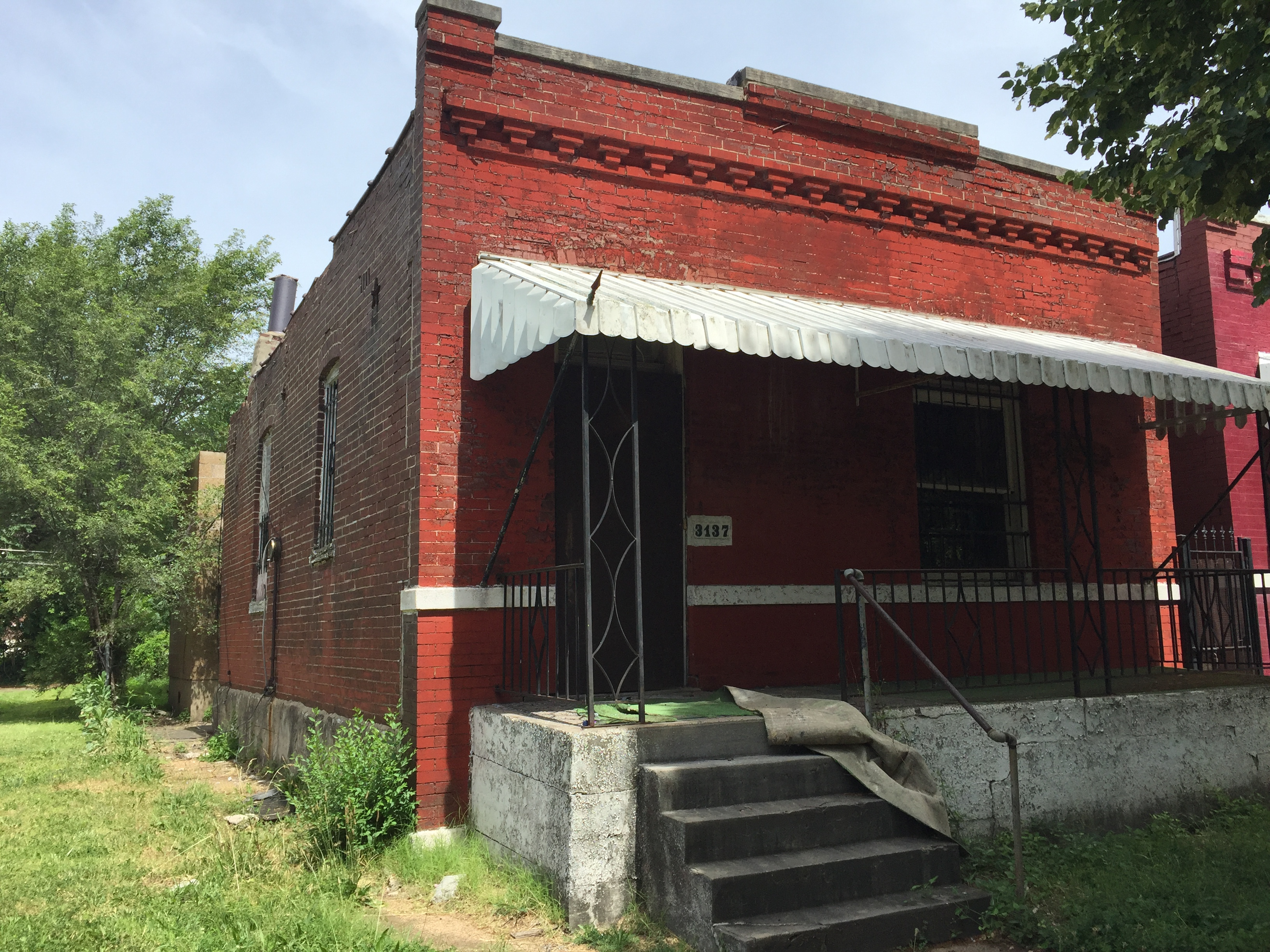
- Chuck Berry House in 2017

- Location within St. Louis Location within the United States
- Location: 3137 Whittier Street, St. Louis, Missouri
- Coordinates: 38°39′51″N 90°13′53″W
- Built: 1910
- Architect: William Moxey and James Podmore
- Architectural style: Shaped-parapet single-family
- NRHP reference No.: 08001179
- Added to NRHP: 2008

The Chuck Berry House is the former home of American rock and roll musician Chuck Berry in St. Louis, Missouri located at 3137 Whittier Street. The house was Berry's home when he wrote and first performed the majority of songs with which he is identified, including "Maybellene" (1955), "Roll Over Beethoven" (1956), "Too Much Monkey Business" (1956), "Rock and Roll Music" (1957), "School Day" (1957), "Sweet Little Sixteen" (1958), and "Johnny B. Goode" (1958).

== Design ==
Built in 1910, the house is located in the Greater Ville, an economically depressed neighborhood of north St. Louis. The house is vacant, but retains features and integrity dating to Berry's residence, including an awning with a letter "B" for Berry on the front porch. The house is located on a narrow lot and is closely built to other similar houses; the exterior is red brick except for a small concrete-block addition in the rear built by Berry in 1956. The addition was built both to accommodate his growing family and perhaps to allow greater space for musical practice sessions.

The interior of the house includes its original floor plan, hardwood flooring, plaster walls, doors, and fixtures. The kitchen underwent a renovation in the late 1950s, while a metal front door and metal window grilles were installed at a later date. The house otherwise retains its appearance from the time of Berry's residence.

== Residency of Chuck Berry ==
Berry and his wife Themetta moved into the house in 1950 and lived in it for eight years. The house was Berry's home during the most critically acclaimed part of his career, and it represents the most significant site associated with Berry.

In 2008, the Chuck Berry House was listed in the National Register of Historic Places, which was an uncommon listing due to the house's association with a living figure.
