= Captain James Berry House =

Historic house in Massachusetts, United States

- U.S. National Register of Historic Places
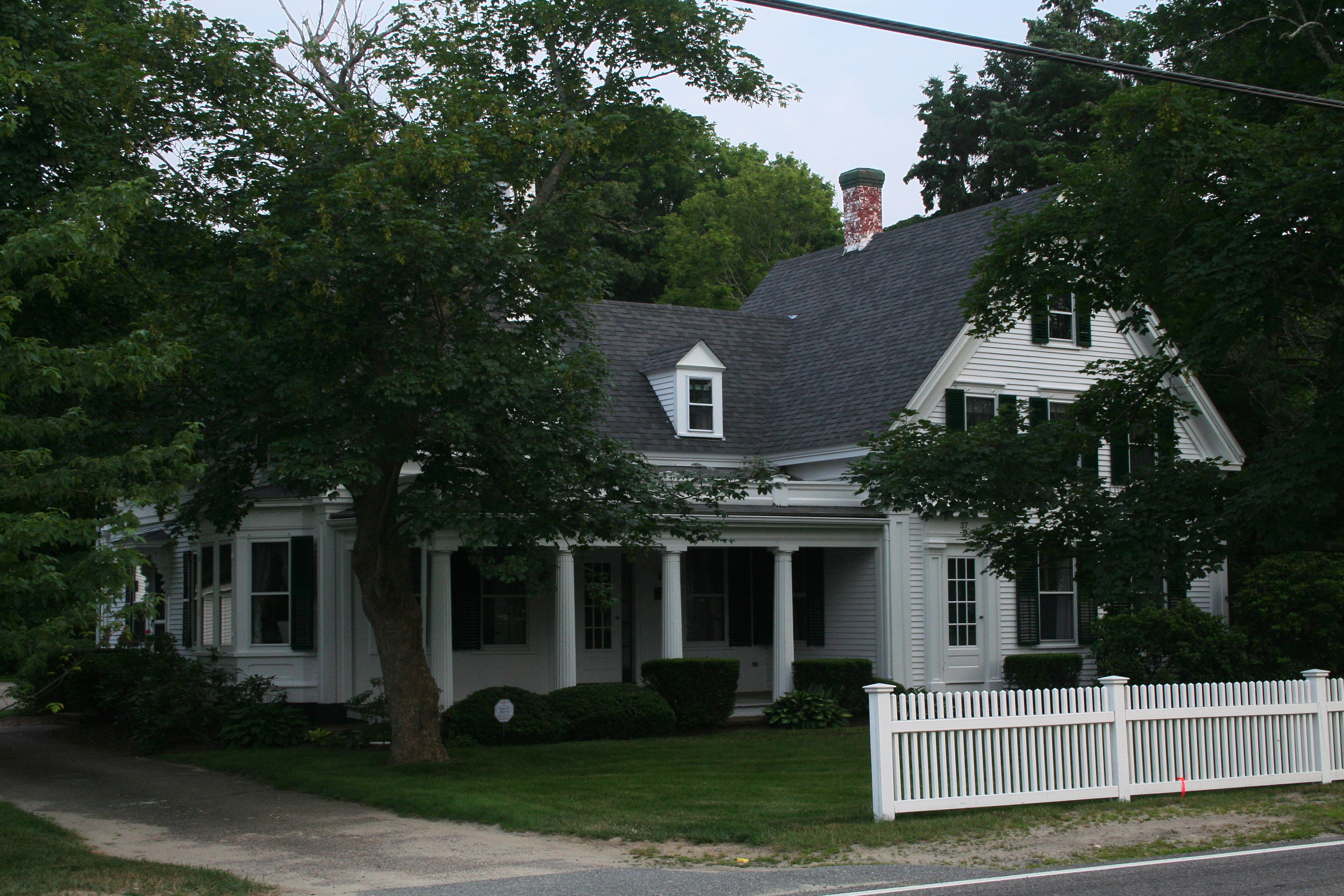

- Location within Cape Cod Location within Massachusetts
- Location: 37 Main St., Harwich, Massachusetts
- Coordinates: 41°40′9″N 70°7′8″W
- Built: 1858
- Architectural style: Greek Revival
- NRHP reference No.: 86001837
- Added to NRHP: September 26, 1986

The Captain James Berry House is a historic house located in Harwich, Massachusetts. Built in 1858, it is a well-preserved example of Greek Revival architecture, notable for its continuous ownership by a single family. The house was listed on the National Register of Historic Places on September 26, 1986, at which time it was owned by James Osmyn Berry, the great-grandson of its first owner.

== Description and history ==
The Berry House is located in the village of West Harwich, on the south side of Main Street between Silver Street and Belmont Road. It is a 1 1/2-story wood-frame structure, with an irregular L-shaped plan and a clapboarded exterior. Its main section is rectangular and covered by a gabled roof, with a three-bay facade that has the main entrance in the left bay. A series of ells, apparently contemporaneous to the main block, extend to the left and rear, visually unified by Greek Revival trim elements. A porch extends left of the main block, supported by fluted Doric columns. On the property to the rear of the house stands a carriage barn that also dates to the period of the house's construction.

The house was built in 1858 and is noted for its long association with the Berry family, whose history on Cape Cod dates as far back as 1643. James Berry, for whom it was built, owned several ships operating out of Harwich. The house was later owned by his brother Henry, and Henry's son Osmyn, both of whom were also sea captains. Osmyn Berry was the first captain to sail the Cape Cod Canal. By the 1970s the house had passed to Osmyn's grandson, the cartoonist James Osmyn Berry.

== See also ==
- National Register of Historic Places listings in Harwich, Massachusetts
