= Berry House (Beebe, Arkansas) =

Historic house in Arkansas, United States

- U.S. National Register of Historic Places
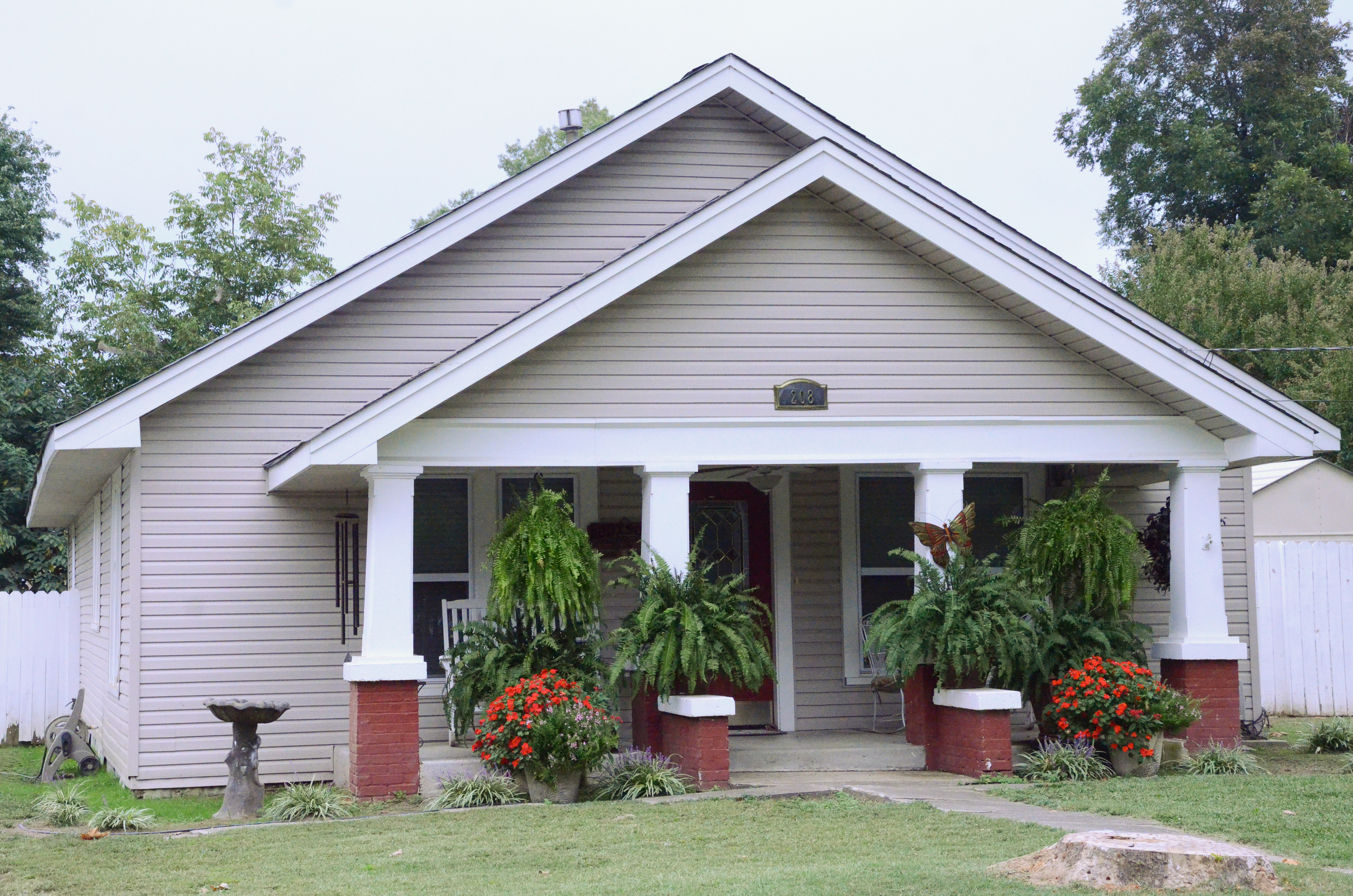

- Location within Arkansas Location within the United States
- Location: 208 Hickory, Beebe, Arkansas
- Coordinates: 35°4′22″N 91°53′14″W
- Area: less than one acre
- Built: c. 1930
- Architectural style: Bungalow/Craftsman
- MPS: White County MPS
- NRHP reference No.: 91001262
- Added to NRHP: September 5, 1991

The Berry House is a historic house located in Beebe, Arkansas.

== Description and history ==
It is a rather modest 1 1/2-story wood-framed structure, three bays wide, with a front-facing gable roof, clapboard siding, and a projecting front entry porch supported by sloping square columns mounted on brick piers. The side-facing roof eaves have exposed rafter ends. Built c. 1930, it is the best-preserved example of this type of small Craftsman style house in Beebe.

The house was listed on the National Register of Historic Places on September 5, 1991.

== See also ==
- National Register of Historic Places listings in White County, Arkansas
