= Nsuta-Kwamang-Beposo (Ghana parliament constituency) =

Constituency in the Ashanti Region of Ghana

- constituency for the Parliament of Ghana
- District: Sekyere Central District
- Region: Ashanti Region of Ghana

Current constituency
- Party: New Patriotic Party
- MP: Adelaide Ntim

Nsuta-Kwamang-Beposo is one of the constituencies represented in the Parliament of Ghana. It elects one Member of Parliament (MP) by the first past the post system of election.

Adelaide Ntim is the member of parliament for the constituency. She was elected on the ticket of the New Patriotic Party (NPP). She won with 23,622 (71.71%) votes over her competitor, Newman Dapaah of the National Democratic Congress (NDC), who got 9,321 votes (28.29%), this makes a total of 32,943 votes.

== See also ==
- List of Ghana Parliament constituencies
