= Col. Sidney Berry House =

Historic house in New York, United States

- U.S. National Register of Historic Places
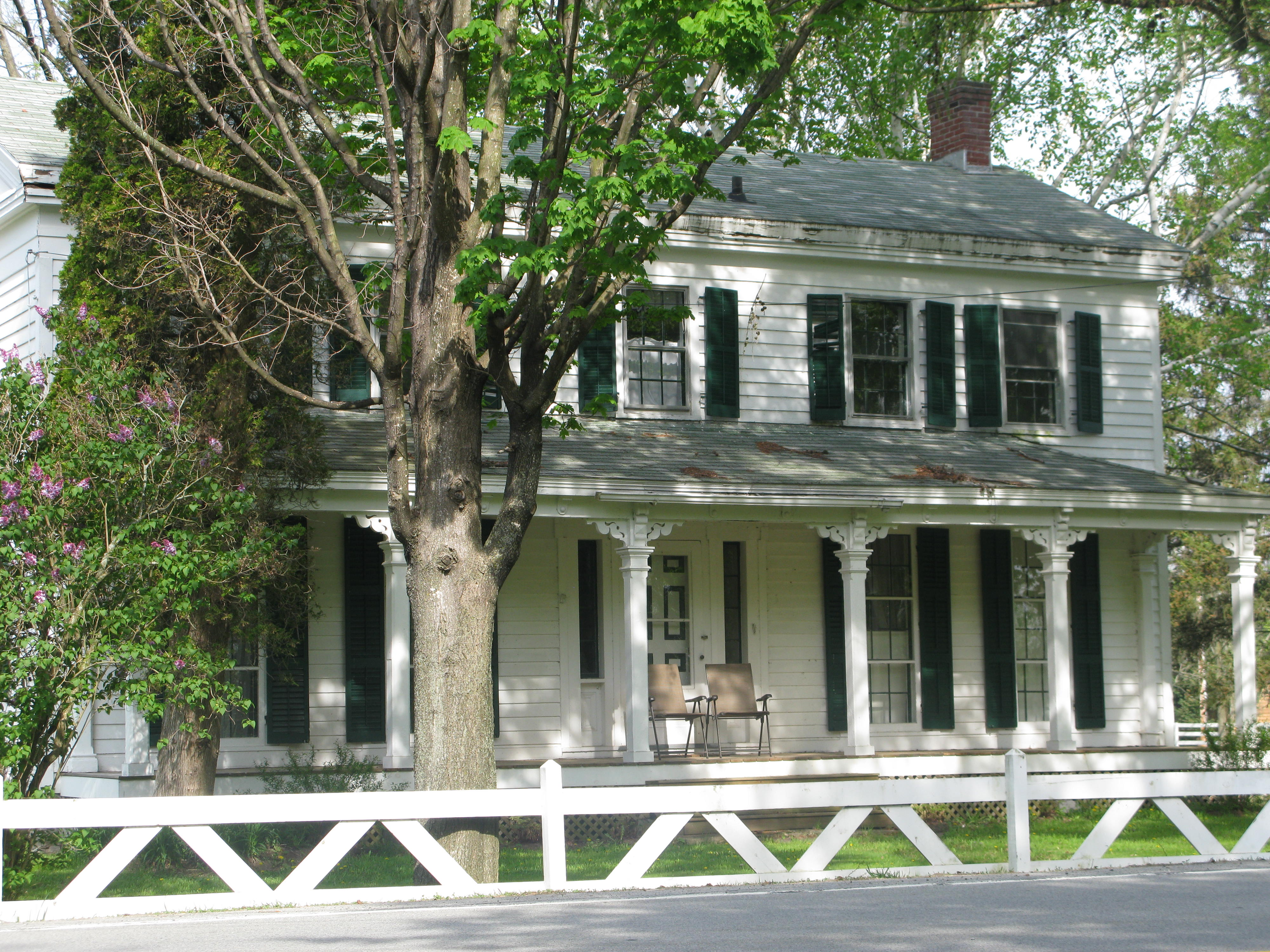

- Location within New York Location within the United States
- Location: 725 W. River Rd., Northumberland, New York
- Coordinates: 43°12′46″N 73°35′8″W
- Area: 13.8 acres (5.6 ha)
- Built: c. 1800
- Architectural style: Federal, Greek Revival
- NRHP reference No.: 03001281
- Added to NRHP: December 12, 2003

The Col. Sidney Berry House is a historic house located at 725 West River Road in Northumberland, Saratoga County, New York.

== Description and history ==
It was built in about 1800, and is a two-story, five-by-two-bay, timber-framed gable-roofed residence. It consists of a rectangular main block and an additional 1 1/2-story rear wing. It features a Federal style entrance and Greek Revival period details on the interior added with a renovation about 1850.

It was added to the National Register of Historic Places on December 12, 2003.
