= George O. Berry House =

Historic house in Georgia, United States

- U.S. National Register of Historic Places
- Location within Georgia
- Location: 912 2nd Ave., Columbus, Georgia
- Coordinates: 32°27′47″N 84°59′26″W
- Area: less than one acre
- Built: c.1896
- Architectural style: Classical Revival
- MPS: Columbus MRA
- NRHP reference No.: 80001124
- Added to NRHP: September 29, 1980

The George O. Berry House in Columbus, Georgia was built around 1896. Also known as the Charles M. Evert Law Office, it was listed on the National Register of Historic Places in 1980.

It is a two-story frame construction Classical Revival house built on brick piers, with a one-story porch and a truncated hipped roof. It seems to have originally been the home of George O. Berry, a manufacturer of bricks. By 1900 it was home of shoe and boot merchant H. W. Garrett and his wife Emma.

Its National Register listing was within a batch of numerous Columbus properties determined to be eligible consistent with a 1980 study of historic resources in Columbus.
