= Ghana Drone Delivery Service =

Organization delivering medical supplies by drone

The Ghana Drone Delivery Service was launched on 24 April 2019 (7 years ago), to deliver medical supplies within designated areas in Ghana with the use of drones.

Zipline in partnership with the Ghana Health Service operates 24 hours a day. The President, Nana Akufo Addo commissioned the second based delivery at Mampong in the Ashanti Region.

The Ghana Police Service has adopted drone technology to complement the work of officers on the ground. Drone technology will enable the police force to detect and combat crime.

By November 2020, five companies had been commissioned to provide drone services in the country. They are SKT Aeroshutter, Rocketmine Aerial Data Solutions, Zipline International, Rudan Engineering, and Axis Drone Surveys. These were chosen out of 977 applications.

== Zipline ==
Zipline is a United States-based medical drone delivery company operating in Rwanda and now Ghana. The first distribution center opened in Omenako in April 2019. Medical products -- including blood, plasma, medicines, and vaccines -- are stored centrally at Zipline's distribution centers and distributed quickly to hospitals and clinics. The service also delivered COVID-19 test kits and this lessened the time that was spent sending them by road.

=== How it Works ===
- Doctors place an order for the product they need.
- Zipline operators package the product into the drone which then launches into the air, flying 100km/hour. The drones are fully autonomous and battery-powered.
- The drone flies over the ordering-hospital or clinic and drops the package mid-air. The package floats down, using a parachute to slow its momentum, and the drone flies back to the Zipline distribution center to be reloaded.

=== Delivery Centers ===
1. Omenako
2. Mampong
3. Kukua
4. Sefwi Wiawso
