= Oku Ampofo =

Ghanaian artist (1908–1998)

- Born: 4 November 1908; Amanase, Akuapem, Gold Coast
- Died: 1998 (aged 89–90)
- Education: University and Royal College of Edinburgh
- Occupations: Sculptor and doctor

Oku Ampofo (4 November 1908 – 1998) was a Ghanaian sculptor and medical doctor. He became the first Ghanaian to receive a government scholarship to study medicine.

== Early life ==
Oku Ampofo was born in Amanase in Akuapem, Gold Coast. He studied medicine in Edinburgh, Scotland, at the university and Royal College of Edinburgh and Glasgow between 1933 and 1939. In 1939 he obtained his medical degree.

== Career ==
In 1950, he began to specialize in the use of medical herbs and exotic medicines. He is to be considered a pioneer in the use of phytotherapy. He founded the Center for Scientific Research in Natural Medicine.

Ampofo was also an actor and sculptor. He began sculpting during his medical studies in Edinburgh, but later achieved national and international fame. Of particular note is his association the Oku Ampofo foundation which supports community development projects for the people of Ghana and in particular the city of Mampong Akuapem, where for many years he practised medicine. The Foundation supports research on herbal medicines needed to treat critical diseases in Ghana, West Africa and around the world. Ampofo died in 1998

== Artistic practice ==
Oku performed hardwood and multi-colored work or concrete. His theoretical and imaginary corpus draws inspiration from the cultural and socio-religious aspects of the Ghanaian way of life.

== Exhibitions ==
He exhibited in Senegal, Nigeria, England, the United States, Israel, Brazil and Romania. His work influenced Ghanaian artists, painters, sculptors and potters. He participated in the important Tendances et Confrontations exhibition organized during the Festival Mondial des Arts Nègres in Dakar in 1966.
