= Sekyere Central District =

- District
- Districts of Ashanti Region

- Location of Sekyere Central District within Ashanti
- Coordinates: 7°1′N 1°23′W
- Country: Ghana
- Region: Ashanti
- Capital: Nsuta

Government
  - District Executive: Hon. Bediako Kwadwo Banahene
  - Succeeded: Hon. Haruna Oppong Boateng

Area
  - Total: 2,345 km^{2} (905 sq mi)

Population (2021)
  - Total: 73,228
  - Density: 31.23/km^{2} (80.88/sq mi)
- Time zone: UTC+0 (GMT)

Sekyere Central District is one of the forty-three districts in Ashanti Region, Ghana. Originally it was formerly part of the then-larger Sekyere West District in 1988, which was created from the former Sekyere District Council. However on 1 November 2007, the eastern part of the district was split off to create Sekyere Central District; while the remaining portion has since then been officially renamed as Mampong Municipal District, which it was elevated to municipal district assembly status on that same year. The district assembly is located in the northern part of Ashanti Region and has Nsuta as its capital town.

== Sources ==
- "Districts of Ghana". Statoids.
- GhanaDistricts.com
