= Mampong Municipal District =

Mampong Municipal Assembly
- Municipal District
- Districts of Ashanti Region

- Location of Mampong Municipal District within Ashanti
- Coordinates: 7°4′N 1°24′W
- Country: Ghana
- Region: Ashanti
- Capital: Mampong

Government
  - Municipal Chief Executive: Thomas Appiah-Kubi

Area
  - Total: 2,345 km^{2} (905 sq mi)

Population (2021 Census)
  - Total: 116,632
  - Density: 49.74/km^{2} (128.8/sq mi)
- Time zone: UTC+0 (GMT)
- Website: http://mampongmunicipalassembly.com

Mampong Municipal Assembly is one of the forty-three districts in Ashanti Region, Ghana. Originally it was formerly part of the then-larger Sekyere West District in 1988, which was created from the former Sekyere District Council. However on 1 November 2007, the eastern part of the district was split off to create Sekyere Central District; while the remaining portion has since then been officially renamed as Mampong Municipal District, which it was elevated to municipal district assembly status on that same year. The municipality is located in the northern part of Ashanti Region and has Mampong as its capital town.

== Cities and towns ==
- Mampong

Mampong Municipal District is one of the forty-three administrative districts in the Ashanti Region of Ghana. The district was elevated to municipal status in November 2007 by Legislative Instrument (L.I.) 1908. The capital town, Mampong, is located approximately 52 kilometers north of Kumasi, the regional capital.

== Geography ==
The municipality lies between longitudes 0.05° and 1.30° west and latitudes 6.55° and 7.30° north. It occupies a total land area of 449 square kilometers. The district comprises 79 settlements, with about 55 percent classified as rural and 45 percent urban. The rural communities are primarily located in the northern part of the district and are characterized by scattered settlements with populations often below fifty.

== Demographics ==
According to the 2021 Population and Housing Census, the total population of the municipality was 116,632, comprising 56,965 males (48.8 percent) and 59,667 females (51.2 percent). The population density is approximately 27 persons per square kilometer, which is lower than the Ashanti Regional average of 45.9 and the national average of 49.3. The district has a population growth rate of 2.2 percent, with a projected population of 119,197 in 2023.

The population exhibits a broad-based structure with a large proportion of young people. The working population is estimated at 35,001, with 51 percent engaged in agriculture. Of those employed in agriculture, 58.1 percent are male and 41.9 percent female. A significant portion of agricultural workers falls within the 35 to 60+ age range.

== Administration ==
The Mampong Municipal Assembly operates under Ghana's local government decentralization system. Its vision is to become a professional socio-economic service provider focused on human resource development. The assembly's mission is to improve the living standards of residents through the implementation of policies and programs across sectors such as agriculture, education, health, infrastructure, and governance.

The municipality is made up of seven zonal councils: Mampong, Kofiase, Yonso, Mprim, Adidwan, Benim, and Nkwanta. It has 48 electoral areas and a total of 67 assembly members—48 elected and 19 government appointees. The traditional structure includes the Mampong Traditional Council and 10 divisional chiefs (Abrempongs) who report directly to the Asantehene.

== Economy ==
Agriculture is the dominant economic activity, employing approximately 67.3 percent of the labor force. The municipality has fertile arable land used for cultivating food and cash crops. Other sectors contributing to the local economy include services (12.1 percent), commerce (8.5 percent), and manufacturing (8.9 percent). Small-scale industries include agro-based, forest-based, textile, metalwork, and service enterprises.

The District Chamber of Agriculture, Commerce, and Technology (D-CACT) coordinates agribusiness and industrial development programs such as Planting for Food and Jobs and One District, One Factory. Cashew, oil palm, and cocoa have been identified as priority crops.

According to the 2021 census, 22.5 percent of the population were classified as multidimensionally poor. The average intensity of poverty among the poor was 42.6 percent, resulting in a Multidimensional Poverty Index (MPI) of 0.096. The municipality ranked 99th out of 261 nationwide and 22nd out of 43 in the Ashanti Region. Major deprivations included access to improved toilet facilities (81.5 percent), health insurance (55.1 percent), and overcrowding (39.7 percent).

== Infrastructure ==
The central business district of Mampong has asphalted roads, but outlying areas such as Abrukutuaso, Tunsuom, Adweeho, Bosofour, Tatafroso, and Adiembra Low-Cost face significant challenges. Some road projects, including the Abrukutuaso–Worakese road awarded in 2019, have been terminated for non-performance.

Accident-prone locations include Pentecost Church Junction, Newtown Junction, Methodist Church Junction, and Simple Store Junction. Selected roads under the Cocoa Roads Programme include the Adidwan–Atonsuoagya (2.90 km), Bosomkyekye–Bunuso (7.70 km), Nkwanta–Brengo (7.70 km), and Woraso–Sekruwa (3.30 km) roads.

== Energy ==
The municipality has electricity coverage of over 70 percent and is served by a new Electricity Company of Ghana (ECG) sub-station. It also has eight petrol and four gas refilling stations. Plans are underway with Renergec Company to construct a waste-to-energy plant.

== Health ==
There are 21 health facilities, including one district hospital, seven health centers, one CHAG facility, two quasi-government clinics, four private hospitals, and six CHPS compounds. The total health staff is 594, including four doctors, nine medical assistants, 98 midwives, and 115 general nurses.

Maternal mortality declined from 66.9 per 100,000 live births to 65.1, while stillbirths reduced from 15 to 10 per 1,000 deliveries.

== Education ==
There are 96 primary schools, 62 junior high schools, and six senior high schools (including one vocational school). Tertiary institutions include two colleges of education, one nursing and midwifery training college, and one university. Student enrolment from kindergarten to senior high totals 41,273. Despite this, around 30 percent of school-age children are not enrolled.

== Water and sanitation ==
The municipality faces persistent challenges in sanitation management, such as uncollected refuse, blocked drains, broken waste trucks, and limited infrastructure. Collaborations with Zoomlion Ghana Limited are in place to improve sanitation outcomes.

== Tourism ==
Natural attractions in the municipality include the Kogyae Forest Reserve, the valleys at Ninting, the Mampong Scarp, the Sumanpa waterfall at Daamang, the Amapaa stream at Worakese, and the Abindaali spring at Tunsuom. Though no longer within the municipal boundary, the Atwea Mountains are still promoted for religious tourism, in collaboration with Sekyere Central District.

== Environment ==
Environmental degradation is a growing issue due to deforestation, bushfires, and unsustainable farming. The forest reserve has shrunk from 782 km² in 1990 to 121.07 km², and off-reserve forest from 1,336.78 km² to 58.20 km², with an annual depletion rate of approximately seven percent.

== Financial institutions ==
Financial services are provided by institutions such as Ghana Commercial Bank, National Investment Bank, Otuasekan Rural Bank (Kofiase), and agencies of Kwamanman Rural Bank. Insurance companies operating in the municipality include Enterprise Life and StarLife Insurance.

== Revenue and budget performance ==
As of August 2022, the district's budget performance was as follows:

Revenue source	2022 Budget (GHS)	Actual (as of Aug 2022)	Performance (%)
Internally Generated Funds (IGF)	1,690,349	1,096,355	64.86
Compensation Transfer	3,658,501	2,491,788	68.11
Goods and Services Transfer	114,221	44,613	39.06
DACF/MPCF	5,008,102	946,125	18.89
DACF-RFG	264,829	264,829	100.00
CIDA	69,547	73,363	105.49
Other (JICA)	0	0	0.00

== Market centres ==
The municipality hosts weekly markets at Mampong (Wednesdays) and Kofiase (Fridays). Smaller towns have daily markets that support local economic activity.

== Cities and towns ==
- Mampong

== Sources ==
- "Districts of Ghana". Statoids.
- GhanaDistricts.com
