= Nsuta =

- Town and District Capital
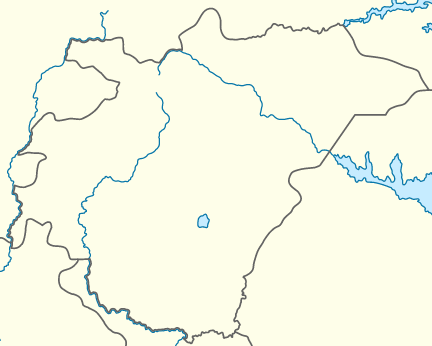
- Location of Nsuta within Ashanti Location of Nsuta in Ghana Location of Nsuta in Africa
- Coordinates: 7°00′40″N 1°22′53″W
- Sovereign state: Ghana
- Region: Ashanti
- District: Sekyere Central
- Elevation: 1,362 ft (415 m)
- Time zone: GMT
  - Summer (DST): GMT

Nsuta is a small town and is the capital of Sekyere Central, a district in the Ashanti Region of Ghana. Nsuta is in Ashanti although there are a number of towns in Ghana with this name.

== Transport ==
This Nsuta is served by a station on the national railway network. There is no railway station serving Asante-Nsuta.

== Towns and villages under Asante-Nsuta Traditional Area ==
- Abaasua
- Abonkoso
- Aframso
- Akyease
- Amangoase
- Amuaman
- Amugyewaa
- Anansu/Appiakrom
- Ankamadoa
- Asuafu
- Atwea
- Awanya
- Bimma
- Bonkron
- Dadease
- Danso
- Ɛkuo
- Gyansa
- Gyetiase
- kↄtↄ Dida
- Kruwi
- Kwagyei
- Kyebi
- Kyeiase
- Kyekyebon
- Mpantuase
- Mpempɛ
- Nkudwua
- Nkwabrim
- Ohemaa Dida
- Pataase
- Tadiɛso
- Tenten
- Twerefuo
- Duamo
- Wuobuoho

There are also three major towns in the Sekyere Central District Assembly, Namely Sekyere-Beposo, Sekyere-Atonsu and Sekyere-Kwamang.
