= Akwasi Ampofo Adjei =

Ghanaian musician (1947–2004)

- Born: 1947; Ghana
- Died: 2004 (aged 56–57)
- Occupation: Musician

Akwasi Ampofo Adjei (1947–2004) also known as Mr A.A.A was a Ghanaian highlife musician.

== Career ==
He was a teacher by profession but because of the influence that music had on his life he abandoned teaching profession, and went into the music industry. He recorded his first song, a single called Obiara nfan’adwene mbra which literally means let's put our heads together.

He formed the Kum Apem Royals musical group as result of the collapse of the initial music group he joined. The new group influenced the lives of other notable musicians, and later recorded Wo ye Ananse a meye Ntikuma, which was the foundation in creating other music like Girl bi nti. He recorded nearly 40 songs and about 35 albums to his credit.

== Discography ==
List of music.

- Obiara nfan’adwene mbra
- Girl bi nti
- Opuro Kwaku
- Ehye wo bo
- Fa no saa
- If you do good you do for yourself
- Ebe to Da
- Wo tee tee me mfa to ha

== Awards ==
- He was voted the Best Band of The Year, given a certificate and a silver cup in 1985.
- He and his Band won the Leisure Awards as Band Of The Year.
- He was selected among 10 bands awarded and honoured with a citation and a Sharp tape recorder by the National Commission on Culture.
- In 1990 he was awarded price money of GHC 500,000 by Oversight Committee of COSGA for his immense contribution to the music industry.

== Death ==
He fell into a coma when travelling from Mampong to Kumasi to attend a court case in the outskirts of Kumasi.
