= Chuck Berry discography =

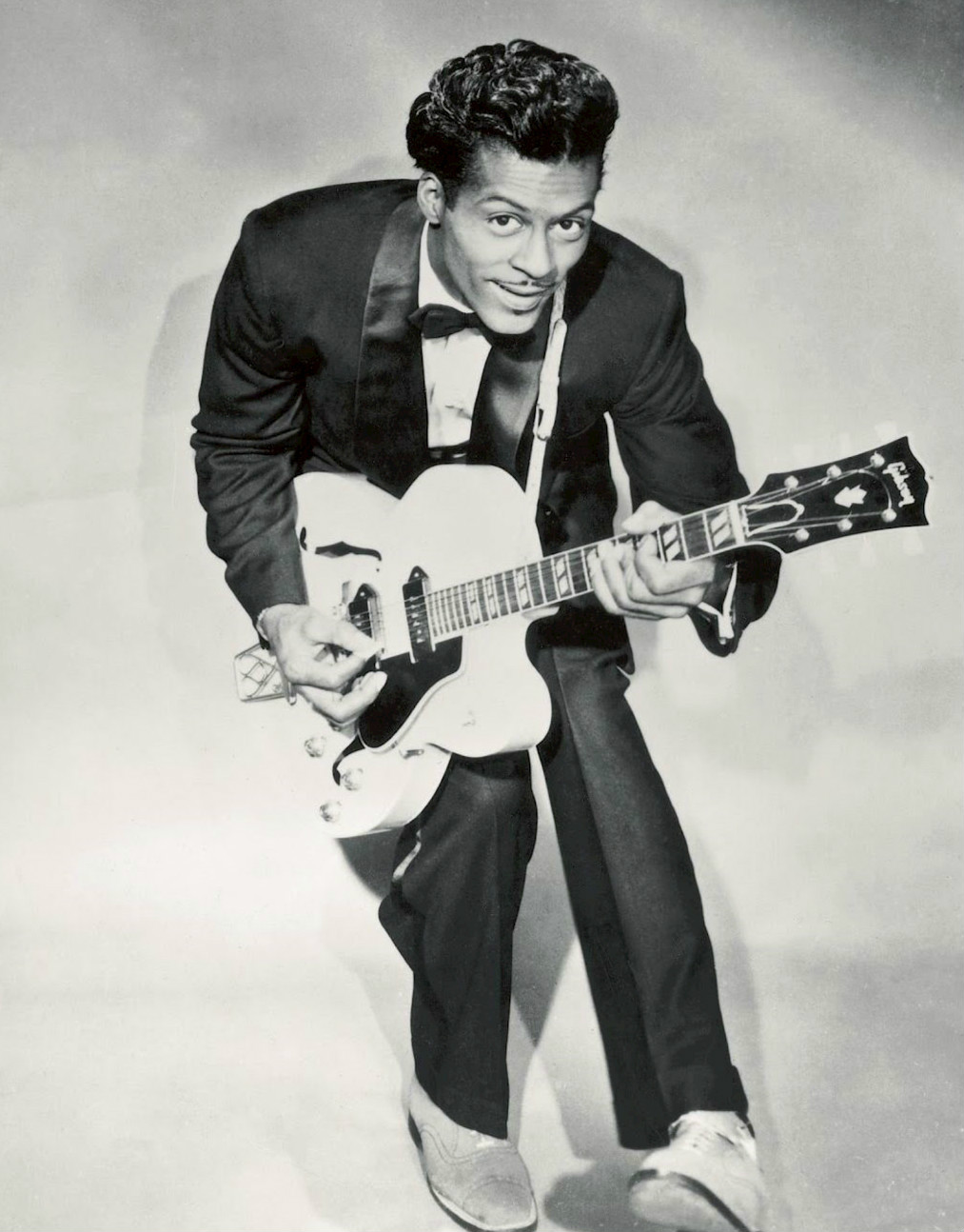
- Berry in 1958
- Studio albums: 20
- Extended plays: 8
- Soundtrack albums: 2
- Live albums: 12
- Compilation albums: 31
- Singles: 50

American rock and roll musician Chuck Berry's discography includes 20 studio albums, 12 live albums, 31 compilation albums, 50 singles, 8 EPs, and 2 soundtrack albums.

Berry's recording career began in 1955, with the release of his single "Maybellene", and spanned a total of 62 years, although the latter 4 decades featured few or no releases. His most prolific and successful period spanned the 1950s and early 1960s, during which time he recorded for Chess. By 1960 he had released most of his hits, including "Maybellene", "Roll Over Beethoven", "Sweet Little Sixteen", and "Johnny B. Goode". Legal troubles, resulting in his imprisonment in 1961, caused a reduction in his output, but his release in 1963, combined with an interest in his songs thanks to the British Invasion, rejuvenated his career. By the time Berry left Chess in 1966, he had released 36 singles, 5 EPs, and 12 albums, including the fake live album, Chuck Berry On Stage and 2 compilation albums, as well as having featured in the soundtrack album for the film Rock, Rock, Rock!.

Berry subsequently signed to Mercury Records, where he stayed until 1970. During his tenure at Mercury, he released 5 albums, including his first real live album, as well as 5 singles, before he returned to Chess, where he released a further 5 singles and albums each, including The London Chuck Berry Sessions, which became his best-selling album, supported by his only #1 single, "My Ding-a-Ling". After his release from Chess in 1975, Berry's releases became sporadic, briefly recording for Atco in 1979, resulting in his final studio album released during his life, Rockit. His final, posthumous, studio album was 2017's Chuck.

Berry's discography includes a large amount of unofficial live albums, as he performed without being signed to any label for most of his latter years, as well as a number of re-packaged or unofficial compilation albums, owing to Chess Records' complicated ownership history.

Overseas, Berry's discography differed from that in the US, most notably in the UK, where his early work was released mostly by London Records until 1960, then Pye Records until 1965, before being issued directly by Chess or Mercury. This resulted in a number of exclusive British EP releases on the one hand, and a number of unissued LPs and singles on the other.

In the US, Berry saw a total of 25 charting singles and 4 charting B-sides, as well as 5 charting albums. Of these, 2 singles have been certified Platinum by the RIAA, as well as 1 Gold single and 1 Gold album.

== Albums ==
=== Studio albums ===
Title	Album details	Peak chart positions							Certifications
Title	Album details	US	CAN	FRA	GER	NL	SWI	UK	Certifications
After School Session	Released: May 1957; Label: Chess (LP-1426); Format: mono LP	—	—	—	—	—	—	—	
One Dozen Berrys	Released: March 1958; Label: Chess (LP-1432); Format: mono LP	—	—	—	—	—	—	—	
Berry Is on Top	Released: July 1959; Label: Chess (LP-1435); Format: mono/stereo LP	—	—	—	—	—	—	—	
Rockin' at the Hops	Released: July 1960; Label: Chess (LP-1448); Format: mono LP	—	—	—	—	—	—	—	
New Juke Box Hits	Released: March 1961; Label: Chess (LP-1456); Format: mono LP	—	—	—	—	—	—	—	
Two Great Guitars (with Bo Diddley)	Released: August 1964; Label: Checker (LP-2991); Format: mono LP	—	—	—	—	—	—	—	
St. Louis to Liverpool	Released: November 1964; Label: Chess (LP/S-1488); Format: mono/stereo LP	124	—	—	—	—	—	—	
Chuck Berry in London	Released: April 1965; Label: Chess (LP/S-1495); Format: mono/stereo LP	—	—	—	—	—	—	—	
Fresh Berry's	Released: November 1965; Label: Chess (LP/S-1498); Format: mono/stereo LP	—	—	—	—	—	—	—	
Chuck Berry's Golden Hits	Released: March 1967; Label: Mercury (MG-21103/SR-61103); Format: mono/stereo LP	—	—	—	—	—	—	—	
Chuck Berry in Memphis	Released: September 1967; Label: Mercury (MG-21123/SR-61123); Format: mono/stereo LP	—	—	—	—	—	—	—	
From St. Louie to Frisco	Released: November 1968; Label: Mercury (SR-61176); Format: stereo LP	185	—	—	—	—	—	—	
Concerto in B. Goode	Released: June 1969; Label: Mercury (SR-61223); Format: stereo LP	—	—	—	—	—	—	—	
Back Home	Released: November 1970; Label: Chess (LPS-1550); Format: stereo LP	—	—	—	—	—	—	—	
San Francisco Dues	Released: September 1971; Label: Chess (CH-50008); Format: stereo LP	—	—	—	—	—	—	—	
The London Chuck Berry Sessions	Released: June 1972; Label: Chess (CH-60020); Format: stereo LP/8-track/cassette	8	6	—	—	—	—	—	RIAA: Gold
Bio	Released: August 1973; Label: Chess (CH-50043); Format: stereo LP	175	—	—	—	—	—	—	
Chuck Berry	Released: February 1975; Label: Chess (CH-60032); Format: stereo LP	—	—	—	—	—	—	—	
Rockit	Released: 1979; Label: Atco (SD-38-118); Format: stereo LP	—	—	—	—	—	—	—	
Chuck	Released: June 2017; Label: Dualtone; Format: CD/Digital/LP	49	—	39	31	61	14	9	
"—" denotes releases that did not chart.

=== Live albums ===
Title	Album details	Peak chart positions			Certifications
Title	Album details	US	CAN	UK	Certifications
Chuck Berry on Stage	Released: August 1963; Label: Chess; Format: LP	29	—	6	
Live at the Fillmore Auditorium	Released: September 1967; Label: Mercury; Format: LP	—	—	—	
The London Chuck Berry Sessions	Released: October 1972; Label: Chess (CH-60020); Format: stereo LP	8	6	—	
Chuck Berry Live in Concert	Released: 1978; Label: Magnum	—	—	—	
Alive and Rockin'	Released: 1981; Label: W.A.A.	—	—	—	
Toronto Rock 'n' Roll Revival 1969 Vol. II	Released: 1982; Label: Accord	—	—	—	
Toronto Rock 'n' Roll Revival 1969 Vol. III	Released: 1982; Label: Accord	—	—	—	
Live!	Released: 1994; Label: Columbia River	—	—	—	
Live on Stage	Released: 2000; Label: Magnum	—	—	—	
Chuck Berry – In Concert	Released: 2002; Label: Magnum	—	—	—	
Rockin' Rollin' New Year's Eve	Released: 2020; Label: Liberation Hall; Format: LP	— (Note: Rockin' Rollin' New Year's Eve did not enter the Billboard 200, but it peaked at No. 3 on the Billboard Blues Albums chart.)	—	—	
"—" denotes releases that did not chart.

=== Compilation albums ===
Title	Album details	Peak chart positions				Certifications
Title	Album details	US	FRA	SWI	UK	Certifications
Chuck Berry Twist	Released: February 1962; Label: Chess (LP-1465); Format: LP	—	—	—	12	
More Chuck Berry	Released: December 1963; Label: Pye International (NPL 28028); Format: LP	—	—	—	9	
Chuck Berry's Greatest Hits	Released: April 1964; Label: Chess (LP-1485); Format: LP	34	—	—	—	
The Latest and the Greatest	Released: May 1964 (UK); Label: Pye International (NPL 28031); Format: LP	—	—	—	8	
You Never Can Tell	Released: September 1964 (UK); Label: Pye International (NPL 29039); Format: LP	—	—	—	18	
Chuck Berry's Golden Decade	Released: 1967; Label: Chess (2CH-1514); Format: Double LP	72	—	—	—	
Chuck Berry's Golden Decade, Vol. 2	Released: February 1973; Label: Chess (2CH-60023); Format: Double LP	110	—	—	—	
Chuck Berry's Golden Decade, Vol. 3	Released: May 1974; Label: Chess (2CH-60028); Format: Double LP	—	—	—	—	
Motorvatin'	Released: 1976 (Europe); Label: Chess (9288 690); Format: LP	—	—	—	7	
The Great Twenty-Eight	Released: 1982; Label: Chess (2CH-8201); Format: Double LP (mono)	—	—	—	—	
Motive Series	Released: 1982; Label: Mercury (6463129); Format: LP	—	—	—	—	
Chess Masters	Released: March 1983; Label: Chess (CXMP 2011); Format: LP	—	—	—	—	
Rock 'n' Roll Rarities	Released: March 1986; Label: Chess (2CH-92521); Format: Double LP	—	—	—	—	
More Rock 'n' Roll Rarities	Released: August 1986; Label: Chess (CH-9190); Format: LP, CD, Cassette	—	—	—	—	
The Best of the Best of Chuck Berry	Released: 1987/1994; Label: Gusto/Hollywood/IMG; Format: LP, CD, Cassette	—	—	—	—	
The Chess Box	Released: 1988; Label: Chess (CHD3-80001); Format: CD	—	—	—	—	
Missing Berries: Rarities, Vol. 3	Released: June 1990; Label: Chess (CHC/D-9318); Format: Cassette, CD	—	—	—	—	
The Collection	Released: August 26, 1991; Label: MCA (MCAC-17751); Format: Cassette	—	—	—	—	
36 All-Time Greatest Hits	Released: 1996; Label: Universal Distribution; Format: CD	—	—	—	—	
Let It Rock	Released: June 4, 1996; Label: Universal Special (MCAC/D-20931); Format: Cassette, CD	—	—	—	—	
The Best of Chuck Berry	Released: July 26, 1996; Label: MCA (MCAD-11560); Format: Double CD	—	—	—	116	BPI: Gold
Guitar Legends (with Bo Diddley)	Released: February 11, 1997; Label: Universal Special (20974); Format: Cassette, CD	—	—	—	—	
His Best, Vol. 1	Released: March 25, 1996; Label: MCA/Chess (CHD-9371); Format: CD	—	—	—	—	
His Best, Vol. 2	Released: May 20, 1997; Label: MCA/Chess (CHD-9381); Format: CD	—	—	—	—	
The Best of Chuck Berry	Released: September 15, 1997; Label: Universal Distribution; Format: CD	—	—	—	—	
Sweet Little Rock 'n' Roller	Released: October 14, 1997; Label: MCA/Chess (CHD-80245); Format: CD	—	—	—	—	
20th Century Masters: The Best of Chuck Berry	Released: March 23, 1999; Label: MCA (MCAC/D-11944); Format: Cassette, CD	134	—	—	—	
Anthology	Released: June 27, 2000; Label: MCA/Chess (CHD-112304); Format: CD	—	175	48	110	
The Ultimate Collection	Released: September 5, 2000; Label: Universal International (17751); Format: CD	—	—	—	—	
Blues	Released: August 12, 2003; Label: MCA/Chess (B000053002); Format: CD	—	—	—	—	
Chuck Berry	Released: October 28, 2003; Label: Universal International (98017); Format: CD	—	—	—	—	
The Definitive Collection	Released: April 18, 2006; Label: Geffen-Universal; Format: CD	33	—	75	—	
Johnny B. Goode: His Complete '50s Chess Recordings	Released: February 19, 2008; Label: Hip-O Select-Geffen-Universal; Format: CD	—	—	—	—	
You Never Can Tell: His Complete Chess Recordings 1960–1966	Released: March 31, 2009; Label: Hip-O Select-Geffen-Universal (12465); Format: CD	—	—	—	—	
Have Mercy: His Complete Chess Recordings 1969–1974	Released: March 23, 2010; Label: Hip-O Select-Geffen-Universal (13790); Format: CD	—	—	—	—	
Rock And Roll Music – Any Old Way You Choose It: The Complete Studio Recordings... Plus!	Released: November 4, 2014; Label: Bear Family; Format: CD	—	—	—	—	
"—" denotes releases that did not chart.

=== Soundtrack albums ===
Title	Album details
Rock, Rock, Rock!	Released: Dec 1956; Label: Chess (LP-1425); Format: mono LP
Hail! Hail! Rock 'n' Roll	Released: October 1987; Label: MCA (MCA/C/D-6217); Format: LP/Cassette/CD

== EPs ==
Title	EP details	Peak chart positions	
Title	EP details	US	CAN
After School Session	Released: May 1957; Label: Chess (EP 5118); Format: 7" 45 RPM; Origin: US	—	—
Rock and Roll Music	Released: 1957; Label: Chess (EP 5119); Format: 7" 45 RPM; Origin: US	—	—
Sweet Little 16	Released: 1958; Label: Chess (EP 5121); Format: 7" 45 RPM; Origin: US	—	—
Pickin' Berries	Released: 1958; Label: Chess (EP 5124); Format: 7" 45 RPM; Origin: US	—	—
Sweet Little Rock and Roller	Released: 1959; Label: Chess (EP 5126); Format: 7" 45 RPM; Origin: US	—	—
Chuck Berry	Released: 1963; Label: Pye International (NEP 44011); Format: 7" 45 RPM; Origin: UK	—	—
This Is Chuck Berry	Released: 1963; Label: Pye International (NEP 44013); Format: 7" 45 RPM; Origin: UK	—	—
The Best of Chuck Berry	Released: 1963; Label: Pye International (NEP 44018); Format: 7" 45 RPM; Origin: UK	—	—
Berry Christmas	Released: December 15, 2017; Label: Geffen / Universal; Format: Digital; Origin: US	47	42
"—" denotes releases that did not chart.

== Singles ==
Year	Title	Peak chart positions									Certifications	Album
Year	Title	US	US R&B	CAN	FRA	GER	NL	NOR	SWI	UK	Certifications	Album
1955	"Maybellene" "Wee Wee Hours"	5 —	1; 10	— —	— —	— —	— —	— —	— —	— —		Rock, Rock, Rock! After School Session
1955	"Thirty Days (To Come Back Home)" b/w "Together (We Will Always Be)"	—	2	—	—	—	—	—	—	—		Rock, Rock, Rock! After School Session
1956	"No Money Down" b/w "The Downbound Train"	—	8	—	—	—	—	—	—	—		After School Session
1956	"Roll Over Beethoven" b/w "Drifting Heart"	29	2	—	—	31	—	—	—	—		Rock, Rock, Rock! After School Session
1956	"Too Much Monkey Business" b/w "Brown Eyed Handsome Man"	—	4	—	—	—	—	—	—	—		After School Session
1956	"You Can't Catch Me" b/w "Havana Moon"	—	—	—	—	—	—	—	—	—		Rock, Rock, Rock! After School Session
1957	"School Days (Ring! Ring! Goes the Bell)" b/w "Deep Feeling"	3	1	—	—	—	—	—	—	24		After School Session
1957	"Oh Baby Doll" b/w "Lajaunda"	57	12	—	—	—	—	—	—	—		One Dozen Berrys
1957	"Rock and Roll Music" b/w "Blue Feeling"	8	6	—	—	—	—	—	—	—		One Dozen Berrys
1958	"Sweet Little Sixteen" b/w "Reelin' and Rockin'"	2	1	—	—	—	—	—	—	16		One Dozen Berrys
1958	"Johnny B. Goode" b/w "Around and Around"	8	2	—	73	—	—	—	83	—	RIAA: Platinum; BPI: Platinum; RMNZ: Platinum	Berry Is on Top
1958	"Beautiful Delilah" b/w "Vacation Time"	81	—	—	—	—	—	—	—	—		Non-album single
1958	"Carol" b/w "Hey Pedro"	18	9	—	—	—	—	—	—	—		Berry Is on Top
1958	"Sweet Little Rock and Roller" "Jo Jo Gunne"	47; 83	13 —	— —	— —	— —	— —	— —	— —	— —		Berry Is on Top
1958	"Merry Christmas Baby" "Run Rudolph Run"	71; 10	— —	— —	— —	— —	— —	— —	— 39	— 36	RIAA: Platinum ("Run Rudolph Run"); BPI: Platinum ("Run Rudolph Run"); RMNZ: Platinum	Non-album single
1959	"Anthony Boy" b/w "That's My Desire"	60	—	—	—	—	—	—	—	—		Berry Is on Top Non-album track
1959	"Almost Grown" "Little Queenie"	32; 80	3 —	— —	— —	— —	— —	— —	— —	— —		Berry Is on Top
1959	"Back in the U.S.A." "Memphis, Tennessee"	37 —	16 —	— —	— —	— —	— —	— —	— —	— 6		Non-album singles
1959	"Broken Arrow" b/w "Childhood Sweetheart"	108	—	—	—	—	—	—	—	—		Rockin' at the Hops
1960	"Let It Rock" "Too Pooped to Pop"	64; 42	18 —	— —	— —	— —	— —	— —	— —	6 —		Rockin' at the Hops
1960	"Bye Bye Johnny" b/w "Worried Life Blues"	—	—	—	—	—	—	—	—	—		Rockin' at the Hops
1960	"I Got to Find My Baby" b/w "Mad Lad"	—	—	—	—	—	—	—	—	—		Rockin' at the Hops
1960	"Jaguar and Thunderbird" b/w "Our Little Rendezvous"	109	—	—	—	—	—	—	—	—		Non-album single St. Louis to Liverpool
1961	"Little Star" b/w "I'm Talking About You"	—	—	—	—	—	—	—	—	—		New Juke Box Hits
1961	"Go-Go-Go" b/w "Come On"	—	—	—	—	—	—	—	—	38		Non-album singles
1963	"Diploma for Two" b/w "I'm Talking About You"	—	—	—	—	—	—	—	—	—		New Juke Box Hits
1963	"Memphis" b/w "Surfin' USA"	—	—	—	—	—	—	—	—	—		Chuck Berry on Stage
1964	"Nadine (Is It You?)" b/w "O Rangutang"	23	7	—	—	—	—	—	—	27		Non-album singles
1964	"No Particular Place to Go" b/w "You Two"	10	2	6	—	—	—	—	—	3		St. Louis to Liverpool
1964	"You Never Can Tell" b/w "Brenda Lee"	14	-	11	—	—	9	—	—	23	BPI: Silver; RMNZ: Gold	St. Louis to Liverpool
1964	"Chuck's Beat" b/w "Bo's Beat" (both by Chuck Berry & Bo Diddley)	—	—	—	—	—	—	—	—	—		Two Great Guitars
1964	"Little Marie" b/w "Go, Bobby Soxer"	54	30	40	—	—	—	—	—	—		St. Louis to Liverpool
1964	"Promised Land" b/w "The Things I Used to Do"	41	16	30	—	—	—	—	—	26		St. Louis to Liverpool
1965	"Dear Dad" b/w "Lonely School Days"	95	—	—	—	—	—	—	—	—		Chuck Berry in London Non-album track
1965	"It Wasn't Me" b/w "Welcome Back Pretty Baby"	—	—	—	—	—	—	—	—	—		Fresh Berry's
1966	"Ramona Say Yes" b/w "Lonely School Days"	—	—	—	—	—	—	—	—	—		Non-album single San Francisco Dues
1966	"Club Nitty Gritty" b/w "Laugh and Cry"	—	—	—	—	—	—	—	—	—		Chuck Berry's Golden Hits Non-album track
1967	"Back to Memphis" b/w "I Do Really Love You"	—	—	—	—	—	—	—	—	—		Chuck Berry in Memphis
1967	"Feelin' It" (with Miller Band) b/w "It Hurts Me Too" (with Miller Band)	—	—	—	—	—	—	—	—	—		Live at the Fillmore Auditorium
1968	"Louie to Frisco" b/w "Ma Dear"	—	—	—	—	—	—	—	—	—		From St. Louie to Frisco
1969	"It's Too Dark in There" b/w "Good Looking Woman"	—	—	—	—	—	—	—	—	—		Concerto in "B Goode"
1970	"Tulane" b/w "Have Mercy Judge"	—	—	—	—	—	—	—	—	—		Back Home
1972	"My Ding-a-Ling" b/w "Johnny B. Goode"	1	42	1	—	40	29	7	—	1	RIAA: Gold	The London Chuck Berry Sessions
1972	"Reelin' and Rockin'" b/w "Let's Boogie"	27	—	21	—	—	—	—	—	18		The London Chuck Berry Sessions
1973	"Bio" b/w "Roll 'Em Pete"	—	—	—	—	—	—	—	—	—		Bio Non-album track
1975	"Shake, Rattle and Roll" b/w "Baby What You Want Me to Do"	—	—	—	—	—	—	—	—	—		Chuck Berry
1979	"Oh What a Thrill" b/w "California"	—	—	—	—	—	—	—	—	—		Rockit
2017	"Big Boys"	—	—	—	—	—	—	—	—	—		Chuck
2017	"Wonderful Woman"	—	—	—	—	—	—	—	—	—		Chuck
2017	"Lady B. Goode"	—	—	—	—	—	—	—	—	—		Chuck
2024	"Oh Louisiana"	70	—	—	—	—	—	—	—	—		Cowboy Carter
"—" denotes releases that did not chart.

Billboard did not publish a separate R&B singles chart in 1964. For this year only, R&B chart positions are from Cash Box magazine.

=== Billboard Year-End performances ===
Year	Song	Year-End Position
1957	"School Days"	22
1958	"Sweet Little Sixteen"	29
1972	"My Ding-a-Ling"	15
