= Chuck Berry Twist =

Compilation album by Chuck Berry
- Released: February 1962
- Recorded: May 21, 1955 – August 3, 1961, Chicago, Illinois; September 28, 1958, St. Louis, Missouri
- Genre: Rock and roll, rhythm and blues
- Length: 35:04
- Label: Chess
- Producer: Leonard Chess, Phil Chess

Chuck Berry chronology
New Juke Box Hits (1961)	Chuck Berry Twist (1962)	Chuck Berry on Stage (1963)

1963 reissue cover
- 2nd edition cover

Professional ratings
Review scores
Source	Rating
Allmusic	3/5 stars

Chuck Berry Twist is the first compilation album by Chuck Berry, released by Chess Records in February 1962, during Berry's imprisonment. The title was an attempt to capitalize on a new dance craze, the Twist, introduced by Chubby Checker in 1960, even though none of the songs musically conformed to the Twist style (most of the songs predated the introduction of the dance). The album was reissued a year later with a new title, More Chuck Berry. An album with that title was released in the UK by Pye International Records in 1964, featuring the same cover but a completely different track listing.

== Critical reception ==
In a 1978 poll of music critics, Robert Christgau listed the record as the fourth best rock album of all time.

The record was reviewed by Pig River Records on its 50th anniversary in February 2012, receiving a score of 9.0/10.

== Track listing ==
All songs written by Chuck Berry except as noted

=== US versions ===
Side one

1. "Maybellene"
2. "Roll Over Beethoven"
3. "Oh Baby Doll"
4. "Around and Around"
5. "Come On"
6. "Let It Rock"
7. "Reelin' and Rockin'"

Side two

1. "School Days"
2. "Almost Grown"
3. "Sweet Little Sixteen"
4. "Thirty Days"
5. "Johnny B. Goode"
6. "Rock and Roll Music"
7. "Back in the U.S.A."

=== UK version ===
This is the UK Track listing for the album More Chuck Berry. There is no UK version of the iteration of the US album titled Chuck Berry Twist.

Side one

1. "Sweet Little Rock & Roller"
2. "Anthony Boy"
3. "Little Queenie"
4. "Worried Life Blues" (Big Maceo Merriweather)
5. "Carol"
6. "Reelin' & Rockin'"

Side two

1. "Thirty Days"
2. "Brown Eyed Handsome Man"
3. "Too Much Monkey Business"
4. "Wee Wee Hours"
5. "Jo Jo Gunne"
6. "Beautiful Delilah"

== Personnel ==
- Chuck Berry – vocals, guitar
- Willie Dixon – bass
- Johnnie Johnson – piano
- Jasper Thomas – drums
- Ebby Hardy – drums
- Jerome Green – maracas
- Otis Spann – piano
- J. C. Davis – tenor saxophone
- Fred Below – drums
- Lafayette Leake – piano
- George Smith – bass
- Etta James – backing vocals
- The Marquees – backing vocals
- Martha Berry – backing vocals
