= The Definitive Collection (Chuck Berry album) =

Compilation album by Chuck Berry
- Released: 18 April 2006
- Genre: Rock 'n' Roll
- Length: 1:17:17
- Label: Geffen

Professional ratings
Review scores
Source	Rating
AllMusic	5/5 stars
Robert Christgau	A+
Tom Hull	A+
Rolling Stone	5/5 stars

The Definitive Collection is a compilation album by American rock 'n' roll pioneer Chuck Berry that compiles his most successful singles from 1955 to 1964, as well as his sole No. 1 Billboard hit, a live recording of the novelty song "My Ding-a-Ling" released in 1972. Following Berry's death, the album entered the Billboard 200 charts at No. 33 in March 2017, his first top 40 album since 1972.

== Track listing ==
All tracks are written by Chuck Berry, except where noted.

The Definitive Collection track listing
No.	Title	Writer(s)	Length
1.	"Maybellene"		2:21
2.	"Thirty Days"		2:25
3.	"You Can't Catch Me"		2:44
4.	"Too Much Monkey Business"		2:55
5.	"Roll Over Beethoven"		2:23
6.	"Brown Eyed Handsome Man"		2:18
7.	"Havana Moon"		3:08
8.	"School Day (Ring Ring Goes the Bell)"		2:42
9.	"Rock & Roll Music"		2:32
10.	"Oh Baby Doll"		2:38
11.	"Reelin' and Rockin'"		3:16
12.	"Sweet Little Sixteen"		3:02
13.	"Johnny B. Goode"		2:41
14.	"Around and Around"		2:40
15.	"Beautiful Delilah"		2:10
16.	"Carol"		2:49
17.	"Memphis, Tennessee"		2:14
18.	"Sweet Little Rock & Roller"		2:22
19.	"Little Queenie"		2:42
20.	"Almost Grown"		2:21
21.	"Back in the U.S.A."		2:28
22.	"Let It Rock"		1:48
23.	"I'm Talking About You"		1:51
24.	"Come On"		1:50
25.	"Nadine (Is It You?)"		2:35
26.	"You Never Can Tell"		2:43
27.	"Promised Land"		2:24
28.	"No Particular Place to Go"		2:44
29.	"I Want to Be Your Driver"		2:15
30.	"My Ding-a-Ling - Live"	Dave Bartholomew	4:16
Total length:			1:17:17

== Charts ==
The album did not chart at the time of its original release, but charted at No. 33 for a week on the Billboard 200 after Chuck Berry's death in 2017, making it his third highest charting album.

Chart	Peak position
US Billboard 200	33
