= Chuck Berry's Golden Hits =

Studio album by Chuck Berry
- Released: March 1967
- Genre: Rock and roll
- Length: 26:28
- Label: Mercury

Chuck Berry chronology
| Fresh Berry's (1965) | Chuck Berry's Golden Hits (1967) | Chuck Berry in Memphis (1967) |

Professional ratings
Review scores
| Source | Rating |
|---|---|
| Allmusic | 1.5/5 stars |

Chuck Berry's Golden Hits is the tenth studio album by Chuck Berry, released in 1967 by Mercury Records, his first for that label. It consists of new recordings of songs he had recorded for Chess Records and one new song, "Club Nitty Gritty". The re-recordings were performed with faster tempos and recorded in stereo. While the rest of Berry's albums for Mercury rest in obscurity, Golden Hits is still available. In 1989 the CD issue of the collection was augmented with several tracks that were left off the original album.

== Track listing ==
All songs written by Chuck Berry.

Side one

1. "Sweet Little Sixteen" (2:32)
2. "Memphis" (2:07)
3. "School Days (Ring Ring Goes the Bell)" (2:35)
4. "Maybellene" (2:35)
5. "Back in the U.S.A." (2:27)

Side two

1. "Johnny B. Goode" (2:45)
2. "Rock and Roll Music" (2:33)
3. "Roll Over Beethoven" (2:02)
4. "Thirty Days" (2:10)
5. "Carol" (2:24)
6. "Club Nitty Gritty" (2:18)

== 1989 CD reissue ==
1. "Sweet Little Sixteen"
2. "Memphis"
3. "School Days"
4. "Maybellene"
5. "Back in the U.S.A."
6. "Around and Around"
7. "Brown Eyed Handsome Man"
8. "Johnny B. Goode"
9. "Rock and Roll Music"
10. "Roll Over Beethoven"
11. "Thirty Days"
12. "Carol"
13. "Let It Rock"
14. "Reelin' and Rockin'"
15. "Club Nitty Gritty"

== Personnel ==
- Chuck Berry – guitar, vocals
- Ebby Hardy – drums
- Johnnie Johnson – piano, electric piano
- Quincy Macon – rhythm guitar
- Eugene Washington – drums
