= Chuck Berry's Golden Decade =

Compilation album by Chuck Berry
- Released: April 1967, 1973, 1974
- Genre: Rock
- Label: Chess

Volume 2 cover

Volume 3 cover

Professional ratings
Review scores
Source	Rating
Volume 1 Allmusic	4.5/5 stars
Volume 2 Allmusic	4.5/5 stars
Volume 3 Allmusic	4.5/5 stars
Encyclopedia of Popular Music	5/5 stars

Chuck Berry's Golden Decade is a compilation of music by Chuck Berry, released in three volumes in 1967, 1973, and 1974. Covering the decade from 1955 to 1964, each volume consists of a two-LP set of 24 songs recorded by Berry. The first volume reached number 72 on Billboard's Pop Albums chart. The second volume peaked at number 110. The third volume, which included only two hit singles among its tracks, did not chart.

The first two volumes were critically well received. In 1967, Rolling Stone noted that the first volume was "the album you must get" when "looking for the Chuck Berry standards". The album was included in Robert Christgau's "Basic Record Library" of 1950s and 1960s recordings, published in Christgau's Record Guide: Rock Albums of the Seventies (1981).

All three volumes are out of print.

== Track listing ==
=== Chuck Berry's Golden Decade ===
All songs written by Chuck Berry.

1. "Maybellene"
2. "Deep Feeling"
3. "Johnny B. Goode"
4. "Wee Wee Hours"
5. "Nadine"
6. "Brown-Eyed Handsome Man"
7. "Roll Over Beethoven"
8. "Thirty Days"
9. "Havana Moon"
10. "No Particular Place To Go"
11. "Memphis"
12. "Almost Grown"
13. "School Days"
14. "Too Much Monkey Business"
15. "Oh, Baby Doll"
16. "Reelin' and Rockin'"
17. "You Can't Catch Me"
18. "Too Pooped to Pop"
19. "Bye Bye Johnny"
20. "'Round and 'Round"
21. "Sweet Little Sixteen"
22. "Rock and Roll Music"
23. "Anthony Boy"
24. "Back In the U.S.A."

=== Chuck Berry's Golden Decade Volume 2 ===
All songs written by Chuck Berry except where noted.

1. "Carol"
2. "You Never Can Tell"
3. "No Money Down"
4. "Together We Will Always Be"
5. "Mad Lad" (Davis)
6. "Run Rudolph Run" (Marks, Brodie)
7. "Let It Rock"
8. "Sweet Little Rock and Roller"
9. "It Don't Take But A Few Minutes"
10. "I'm Talking About You"
11. "Driftin' Blues" (Brown, Moore, Williams)
12. "Go Go Go"
13. "Jaguar and the Thunderbird"
14. "Little Queenie"
15. "Betty Jean"
16. "Guitar Boogie"
17. "Down the Road Apiece" (Raye)
18. "Merry Christmas Baby" (Baxter, Moore)
19. "The Promised Land"
20. "Jo Jo Gunne"
21. "Don't You Lie to Me"
22. "Rockin' at the Philharmonic"
23. "La Juanda" (Espanola)
24. "Come On"

=== Chuck Berry's Golden Decade Volume 3 ===
All songs written by Chuck Berry except where noted. This is the track listing as released in the US and most other markets:

1. "Beautiful Delilah"
2. "Go Bobby Soxer"
3. "I Got to Find My Baby" (Doctor Clayton)
4. "Worried Life Blues" (Big Maceo Merriweather)
5. "Roly Poly"
6. "Downbound Train"
7. "Broken Arrow" (E. Anderson)
8. "Confessin' the Blues" (Walter Brown, Jay McShann)
9. "Drifting Heart"
10. "In-Go" (author unknown)
11. "Man and the Donkey"
12. "St. Louis Blues' (W.C. Handy)
13. "Our Little Rendezvous"
14. "Childhood Sweetheart"
15. "Blues for Hawaiians"
16. "Hey Pedro"
17. "My Little Love Light"
18. "Little Marie"
19. "County Line"
20. "Viva Viva Rock And Roll"
21. "House of Blue Lights" (Don Raye, Freddie Slack)
22. "Time Was"
23. "Blue on Blue"
24. "Oh Yeah"

The UK version of this album switched out 2 of the songs on the final side, and a sticker described the last 5 songs as "previously unreleased." The last side of the UK album is as follows:

18. "Berry Pickin'"
20. "County Line"
21. "House of Blue Lights" (Don Raye, Freddie Slack)
22. "Do You Love Me"
23. "Blue on Blue"
24. "Oh Yeah"

== Personnel ==
- Chuck Berry – guitar, vocals
