= Berry Is on Top =

Studio album by Chuck Berry
- Released: July 1959
- Recorded: May 21, 1955–1959, Chicago, Illinois
- Genre: Rock and roll
- Length: 30:25
- Label: Chess LP–1435
- Producer: Leonard Chess, Phil Chess

Chuck Berry chronology
One Dozen Berrys (1958)	Berry Is on Top (1959)	Rockin' at the Hops (1960)

Singles from Berry Is On Top
- 1. "Maybellene" Released: July 1955; 2. "Johnny B. Goode" / "Around and Around" Released: March 31, 1958; 3. "Carol"/"Hey Pedro" Released: August 1958; 4. "Sweet Little Rock & Roller"/"Jo Jo Gunne" Released: October 1958; 5. "Anthony Boy" Released: January 1959; 6. "Almost Grown" / "Little Queenie" Released: March 1959

Professional ratings
Review scores
Source	Rating
AllMusic	5/5 stars
The Encyclopedia of Popular Music	4/5 stars
The Rolling Stone Album Guide	4/5 stars

Berry Is on Top is the third studio album by rock and roll artist Chuck Berry, released in July 1959 on Chess Records, catalogue LP 1435. With the exception of one track, "Blues for Hawaiians", all selections had been previously released on 45 rpm singles, several of which were double-sided and charted twice. In his review of the album for AllMusic, Cub Koda described it as "almost a mini-greatest-hits package in and of itself" and the most perfectly realized collection of Berry's career. In 2008, Mobile Fidelity Sound Lab reissued the album with St. Louis to Liverpool on an Ultradisc II Gold compact disc. In 2012, Hoodoo reissued the album with One Dozen Berrys on the same CD.

== Track listing ==
All tracks are written by Chuck Berry.

Side one
No.	Title	Length
1.	"Almost Grown"	2:21
2.	"Carol"	2:48
3.	"Maybellene"	2:23
4.	"Sweet Little Rock & Roller"	2:22
5.	"Anthony Boy"	1:54
6.	"Johnny B. Goode"	2:41

Side two
No.	Title	Length
1.	"Little Queenie"	2:43
2.	"Jo Jo Gunne"	2:47
3.	"Roll Over Beethoven"	2:24
4.	"Around and Around"	2:42
5.	"Hey Pedro"	1:57
6.	"Blues for Hawaiians"	3:23
Total length:		30:25

== Personnel ==
- Chuck Berry – vocals, guitars
- Johnnie Johnson, Lafayette Leake – piano
- Willie Dixon – double bass
- George Smith – bass
- Fred Below, Ebbie Hardy, Jaspar Thomas – drums
- Jerome Green – maracas
- The Moonglows – backing vocals
- Bob Bushnell – bass on "Around and Around"

== Charting history ==
Singles - Billboard (United States)

Year	Single	Chart	Position
1955	"Maybellene"	Billboard Top 100	5
1956	"Roll Over Beethoven"	Billboard Top 100	29
1958	"Johnny B. Goode"	Billboard Top 100	8
1958	"Carol"	Billboard Hot 100	18
1958	"Jo Jo Gunne"	Billboard Hot 100	83
1958	"Sweet Little Rock & Roller"	Billboard Hot 100	47
1959	"Anthony Boy"	Billboard Hot 100	60
1959	"Almost Grown"	Billboard Hot 100	32
1959	"Little Queenie"	Billboard Hot 100	80

== Charts ==
Chart performance for Berry Is on Top
Chart (2026)	Peak position
US Top Blues Albums (Billboard)	5
