= You Can't Catch Me =

Single by Chuck Berry
- B-side: "Havana Moon"
- Released: 1956
- Recorded: December 20, 1955
- Studio: Universal Recording Corp. (Chicago)
- Genre: Rock and roll
- Length: 2:42
- Label: Chess 1645
- Songwriter: Chuck Berry
- Producers: Leonard Chess, Phil Chess

Chuck Berry singles chronology
"Too Much Monkey Business" (1956)	"You Can't Catch Me" (1956)	"School Days" (1957)

"You Can't Catch Me" is a song written for the 1956 musical drama film Rock, Rock, Rock!. It was recorded by Chuck Berry and released as a single in 1956.

== Background ==
The song's lyrics describe racing a souped-up "air-mobile" down the New Jersey Turnpike, then unfolding its wings and taking off. At the time, the Aerocar designed and built by Molt Taylor was nearing Civil Aviation Authority approval for mass production as a flying car with detachable folding wings.

Berry's song was featured in the 1956 film Rock, Rock, Rock and was one of the four songs from the film that was included on the "soundtrack" album (the only one of his songs to be used both in the movie and on the album).

Originally recorded by Berry in May 1955 at Universal Recording Corp. for Chess Records during the same session as "Maybellene" and "Wee Wee Hours", the lyrics refer to both of those songs.

== Cover versions ==
The song's music publisher, Morris Levy, sued John Lennon for copyright infringement because of the melodic similarity between "You Can't Catch Me" and the Beatles' 1969 song "Come Together", written by Lennon, and because the Beatles' song used some of the lyrics of Berry's song ("here come old flat-top"). The suit was settled out of court. As part of the settlement, Lennon included a rendition of "You Can't Catch Me" on his 1975 album of cover versions, Rock 'n' Roll.

Cover versions of the song were also recorded by Sleepy LaBeef for a 1963 single, by The Rolling Stones for their 1965 album The Rolling Stones No. 2, and by The Blues Project for their 1966 album Projections. It was also done by Love Sculpture for their 1970 album Forms and Feelings, George Thorogood and the Destroyers for their 1988 album Born to Be Bad, Jo Jo Zep & The Falcons on their 2003 album Ricochet and by Florence Rawlings for her 2009 debut album A Fool in Love.
