= Chuck Berry on Stage =

Live album by Chuck Berry
- Released: August 1963
- Genre: Rock and roll
- Label: Chess
- Producers: Leonard Chess, Philip Chess

Chuck Berry chronology
Chuck Berry Twist (1962)	Chuck Berry on Stage (1963)	Two Great Guitars (1964)

Professional ratings
Review scores
Source	Rating
Allmusic	link

Chuck Berry on Stage is the first "live" album by Chuck Berry, (Note: According to a journal article in Popular Music & Society, *Chuck Berry Live on Stage* is what is known as a "fake live" album staged "with a well-behaved, artificial audience".) released in 1963 by Chess Records. Although marketed as a live album, it actually compiled older studio recordings overdubbed with audience sounds.

== Overview ==
Despite being promoted as a live album, it is a collection of previously released (with the exceptions of "All Aboard", "Trick or Treat", "I Just Want To Make Love To You", and "Still Got the Blues") studio recordings with overdubbed audience sounds to simulate a live recording. The track listed on the album as "Surfin' USA" is actually a retitled "Sweet Little Sixteen", originally released in 1958, the melody of which was used in The Beach Boys' 1963 hit "Surfin' USA". The track listed as "Rockin' on the Railroad" is also a retitled version of a previously released song, the 1960 single "Let It Rock". Berry's cover of Willie Dixon's "I Just Want to Make Love to You" was later re-recorded and released on the very rare Chess LP CH60032 Chuck Berry in 1975.

== Track listing ==
All tracks are written by Chuck Berry, except where noted.

Side One
No.	Title	Writer(s)	Length
1.	"Maybellene"	(Note: Maybellene was originally also credited to Alan Freed and Russ Fratto, as payola.)	2:25
2.	"Memphis"		2:17
3.	"Surfin' Steel"		2:32
4.	"Rockin' on the Railroad" (retitled "Let It Rock")		1:51
5.	"Go, Go, Go"		3:31
6.	"Brown Eyed Handsome Man" (alternate take)		1:46
7.	"Still Got the Blues"		2:08

Side Two
No.	Title	Writer(s)	Length
1.	"Surfin' USA" (retitled "Sweet Little Sixteen")		3:13
2.	"Jaguar and Thunderbird"		1:49
3.	"I Just Want to Make Love to You"	Willie Dixon	2:13
4.	"All Aboard"		2:15
5.	"Trick or Treat"		1:37
6.	"The Man and the Donkey"		2:07
Total length:			29:44

== Personnel ==
- Chuck Berry – guitar, vocals
- Fred Below – drums
- Martha Berry – backing vocals
- Reggie Boyd – bass
- Leroy C. Davis - tenor saxophone
- Willie Dixon – bass
- Jerome Green – maracas
- Ebbie Hardy - drums
- Johnnie Johnson – piano
- Lafayette Leake – piano
- The Moonglows – backing vocals
- George Smith – bass
- Otis Spann – piano
- Phil Thomas – drums

== Chart Performance ==
The album peaked at No. 29 on the Billboard Top LPs, during a seventeen-week run on the chart.

Chart (1963)	Peak position
US Billboard Top LPs	29
