= Fresh Berry's =

Studio album by Chuck Berry
- Released: November 1965
- Recorded: September 1–2, 1965
- Studio: Ter Mar, Chicago, Illinois
- Genre: Rock and roll
- Length: 29:21
- Label: Chess
- Producer: Leonard Chess, Phil Chess

Chuck Berry chronology
Chuck Berry In London (1965)	Fresh Berry's (1965)	Chuck Berry's Golden Hits (1967)

Professional ratings
Review scores
Source	Rating
AllMusic	3.5/5 stars
Record Mirror	3/5 stars

Fresh Berry's [sic] is the ninth studio album by Chuck Berry, released by Chess Records in the United Kingdom in November 1965 and in the United States in April 1966 as an LP record in mono and stereo formats. The US and UK versions of the album have different track listings, "Welcome Back Pretty Baby" is replaced by "Sad Day – Long Night".

It was Berry's last album of new material for Chess Records until Back Home, in 1970. After this album, he recorded his next several releases for Mercury Records.

== Track listing ==
All songs written by Chuck Berry except as noted

Side one

1. "It Wasn't Me" - (2:32)
2. "Run Joe" (Louis Jordan, Walter Merrick, Joe Willoughby) - (2:16)
3. "Everyday We Rock & Roll" – 2:11
4. "One for My Baby (and One More for the Road)" (Harold Arlen, Johnny Mercer) - (2:43)
5. "Welcome Back Pretty Baby" - (2:35)
6. "It's My Own Business" - (2:11)

Side two

7. "Right Off Rampart Street" - (2:22)
8. "Vaya Con Dios" (Buddy Pepper, Carl Hoff, Inez James, Larry Russell) - (2:36)
9. "Merrily We Rock & Roll" - (2:11)
10. "My Mustang Ford" - (2:17)
11. "Ain't That Just Like a Woman" (Claude Demetrius, Fleecie Moore) - (2:13)
12. "Wee Hour Blues" - (3:14)

== Personnel ==
- Chuck Berry – guitar, vocals
- Chuck Bernhard – bass
- Mike Bloomfield – guitar
- Paul Butterfield – harmonica
- Johnnie Johnson – piano
- Jaspar Thomas – drums

Technical

- Ron Malo – engineer
- Don S. Bronstein – cover
