= Rock, Rock, Rock =

Rock, Rock, Rock can refer to

- Rock, Rock, Rock (film), a 1956 film
- Rock, Rock, Rock (soundtrack), the soundtrack of that film, now widely considered Chuck Berry's first album
- Rock, Rock, Rock (TV series), about the life of South Korean rock guitarist Kim Taewon
