= Rockin' at the Hops =

Studio album by Chuck Berry
- Released: July 1960
- Recorded: July 27, 1959 – February 15, March 29, or April 12, 1960, Chicago, Illinois
- Genre: Rock and roll
- Length: 26:36
- Label: Chess
- Producer: Leonard Chess, Phil Chess

Chuck Berry chronology
Berry Is on Top (1959)	Rockin' at the Hops (1960)	New Juke-Box Hits (1961)

Singles from Rockin' at the Hops
- 1. "Childhood Sweetheart" Released: September 11, 1959; 2. "Let It Rock" Released: January 1960; 3. "Bye Bye Johnny" Released: May 1960; 4. "I Got to Find My Baby" Released: August 1960

Professional ratings
Review scores
Source	Rating
AllMusic	3.5/5 stars

Rockin' at the Hops is the fourth studio album by rock and roll pioneer Chuck Berry, released in July 1960 on Chess Records, catalogue LP 1448. With the exception of four tracks, "Down the Road a Piece," "Confessin' the Blues," "Betty Jean," and "Driftin' Blues," all selections had been previously released on 45 rpm singles.

== Songs ==
The first 7" 45-RPM single from Rockin' at the Hops was "Childhood Sweetheart" backed with "Broken Arrow", released in September 1959. The second single was "Let It Rock" backed with "Too Pooped to Pop", released in January 1960; the A-side reached number 64 on the Billboard Hot 100, and the B-side reached number 42 on the Hot 100 and number 18 on the R&B Singles chart. The last two singles—"Bye Bye Johnny" backed with "Worried Life Blues" (released in May) and "I Got to Find My Baby" backed with "Mad Lad" (released in August)—did not chart.

== Track listing ==
All tracks are written by Chuck Berry except where noted.

Side one
No.	Title	Writer(s)	Length
1.	"Bye Bye Johnny"		2:02
2.	"Worried Life Blues"	Big Maceo Merriweather	2:07
3.	"Down the Road a Piece"	Don Raye	2:10
4.	"Confessin' the Blues"	Jay McShann, Walter Brown	2:06
5.	"Too Pooped to Pop"	Billy Davis	2:31
6.	"Mad Lad"		2:06

Side two
No.	Title	Writer(s)	Length
1.	"I Got to Find My Baby"	Doctor Clayton	2:12
2.	"Betty Jean"		2:25
3.	"Childhood Sweetheart"		2:40
4.	"Broken Arrow"		2:19
5.	"Driftin' Blues"	Charles Brown	2:16
6.	"Let It Rock"		1:42
Total length:			26:36

== Personnel ==
- Chuck Berry – vocals, guitars
- Matt "Guitar" Murphy – electric guitar (tracks: A1 to A4, A6, B1, B5)
- Johnnie Johnson – piano (tracks: A3 to A6, B2 to B5)
- Willie Dixon – bass
- Fred Below – drums (tracks: A5, B1, B5)
- Eddie Hardy – drums (tracks: A1 to A4, A6, B1, B5)
- The Ecuadors – backing vocals
- L. C. Davis – tenor saxophone (tracks: A5, B1, B4, B5)
