= Chuck Berry in London =

Studio album by Chuck Berry
- Released: April 1965
- Recorded: December 1964 – January 1965
- Genre: Rock and roll
- Length: 35:33
- Label: Chess
- Producer: Leonard Chess, Philip Chess

Chuck Berry chronology
St. Louis to Liverpool (1964)	Chuck Berry in London (1965)	Fresh Berry's (1965)

Singles from Chuck Berry in London
- 1. "Dear Dad" Released: March 1965

Professional ratings
Review scores
Source	Rating
AllMusic	4/5 stars
Record Mirror	4/5 stars

Chuck Berry in London is the eighth studio album by Chuck Berry, released in 1965 by Chess Records. Only eight of the tracks were actually recorded in London with the UK R&B group the 5 Dimensions, in January, 1965. Five other tracks were recorded in Chicago in December, 1964 with the Jules Blattner Group. The remaining track, "Night Beat" was left over from a 1957 session. "I Want to Be Your Driver," which later appeared as the final track on The Great Twenty-Eight, is based on "Me and My Chaffeur Blues" by Memphis Minnie.

== Track listing ==
All songs written by Chuck Berry except as noted

Side one

1. "My Little Love-Light" – 2:38
2. "She Once Was Mine" – 2:38
3. "After It's Over" – 2:20
4. "I Got a Booking" – 2:54
5. "Night Beat" – 2:43
6. "His Daughter Caroline" – 3:16
7. "You Came a Long Way from St Louis" (Bob Russell, John Benson Brooks) – 2:08

Side two

1. "St. Louis Blues" (W.C. Handy) – 2:39
2. "Jamaica Farewell" (Lord Burgess) – 2:08
3. "Dear Dad" – 1:51
4. "Butterscotch" – 2:40
5. "The Song of My Love" – 2:30
6. "Why Should We End This Way" – 2:53
7. "I Want to Be Your Driver" – 2:15

== Personnel ==
- Chuck Berry – guitar, vocals
- Jules Blattner – guitar
- Jeff Crivet – guitar
- Louis Cennamo – bass
- Bill Bixler – bass
- Bob Scrivens – piano
- Peter John Hogman – harmonica
- Howard Jones – drums
- Chick Kattenhorn – drums
- Brian Hamilton – tenor saxophone
- Bill Armstrong – backing vocals
- Brian Smith – backing vocals
- Mike Boocock – backing vocals
- Rick Green – backing vocals
- Neil Carter – backing vocals
- Roger Eagle – backing vocals
- Roger Fairhurst – backing vocals

== Charting history ==
Singles - Billboard (North America)

Year	Single	Chart	Position
1965	"Dear Dad"	Billboard Hot 100	95
