= Rock, Rock, Rock! (soundtrack) =

Soundtrack album by Chuck Berry, The Moonglows, and The Flamingos
- Released: December 1956
- Recorded: 1955–1956
- Genre: Rock and roll
- Length: 27:18
- Label: Chess LP 1425
- Producers: Leonard Chess, Phil Chess

Chuck Berry chronology
Rock, Rock, Rock! (1956)	After School Session (1957)

Professional ratings
Review scores
Source	Rating
AllMusic	3/5 stars

Rock, Rock, Rock! is the soundtrack album to the motion picture of the same name and was the first LP ever released by Chess Records labeled LP 1425 and Chuck Berry's first appearance on a long player. Only four songs from the album ("Over and Over Again", "I Knew from the Start", "You Can't Catch Me", and "Would I Be Crying") actually appear in the film. Eight additional songs by Chuck Berry, the Moonglows, and the Flamingos make up the balance of the songs. Other artists who appeared in the film were not on the album. Rock, Rock, Rock! is regarded as the first rock and roll movie to have had a soundtrack album issued.

== Track listing ==
1. "I Knew from the Start" - The Moonglows
2. "Would I Be Crying" - The Flamingos
3. "Maybellene" - Chuck Berry
4. "Sincerely" - The Moonglows
5. "Thirty Days" - Chuck Berry
6. "The Vow" - The Flamingos
7. "You Can't Catch Me" - Chuck Berry
8. "Over and Over Again" - The Moonglows
9. "Roll Over Beethoven" - Chuck Berry
10. "I'll Be Home" - The Flamingos
11. "See Saw" - The Moonglows
12. "A Kiss from Your Lips" - The Flamingos

The album was originally released as a promotional item to a handful of radio stations, with a different cover and eight additional songs.

50th Anniversary expanded bonus tracks

13. "I'm Not a Juvenile Delinquent" - Frankie Lymon & the Teenagers
14. "Rock & Roll Boogie" - Alan Freed & His Rock 'n Roll Orchestra
15. "Lonesome Train (On a Lonesome Track)" - Johnny Burnette and the Rock and Roll Trio
