= New Juke Box Hits =

Studio album by Chuck Berry
- Released: March 1961
- Genre: Rock and roll
- Length: 29:07
- Label: Chess
- Producer: Leonard Chess, Philip Chess

Chuck Berry chronology
Rockin' at the Hops (1960)	New Juke Box Hits (1961)	Chuck Berry Twist (1962)

Singles from New Juke Box Hits
- 1. "I'm Talking About You" Released: February 1961; 2. "Diploma for Two" Released: May 1963

New Juke Box Hits is the fifth studio album by rock and roll pioneer Chuck Berry, released in March 1961 by Chess Records. Unlike his previous four LPs, only two songs, "Little Star" backed with "I'm Talking About You", had been previously released on a 45 rpm single.

The album was recorded and released while Berry was in the midst of legal difficulties, which led to his imprisonment in 1962. The adverse publicity from these legal problems affected sales of his records, and the previous single failed to reach the Billboard Hot 100 chart. Berry did not release another album of songs for over three years.

== Legacy ==
William Ruhlmann, writing in a retrospective review for AllMusic, feels that the distractions of his legal problems inhibited Berry, so the songs on this album compare unfavorably with his earlier albums.

== Track listing ==
All tracks composed by Chuck Berry except as noted.

=== Side one ===
1. "I'm Talking About You" – 1:46
2. "Diploma for Two" – 2:28
3. "Thirteen Question Method" – 2:12
4. "Away from You" – 2:38
5. "Don't You Lie to Me" (Hudson Whittaker) – 2:02
6. "The Way It Was Before" – 2:52

=== Side two ===
1. "Little Star" – 2:45
2. "Route 66" (Bobby Troup) – 2:45
3. "Sweet Sixteen" (Joe Josea, B.B. King) – 2:45
4. "Run Around" – 2:31
5. "Stop and Listen" – 2:26
6. "Rip It Up" (John Marascalco, Robert Blackwell) – 1:57

== Personnel ==
- Chuck Berry – vocals, guitars
- Johnnie Johnson – piano
- Reggie Boyd – bass
- Fred Below, Jaspar Thomas – drums
- Leroy C. Davis – tenor saxophone
