= John Lee Hooker Plays & Sings the Blues =

Compilation album by John Lee Hooker
- Released: 1961
- Recorded: 1951–1952
- Genre: Blues
- Length: 35:52
- Label: Chess
- Producer: Joe Von Battle; Leonard Chess; Bernie Besman

John Lee Hooker Plays & Sings the Blues is an album by blues musician John Lee Hooker. which was issued by Chess Records in 1961. It compiles songs recorded in 1951 and 1952, some of which were originally released as singles.

== Reception ==
Professional ratings
Review scores
Source	Rating
AllMusic	5/5 stars

In a brief review for AllMusic, Bill Dahl writes that the album is "filled with 1951–1952 gems from the Hook's heyday".

== Track listing ==
All compositions are credited to John Lee Hooker, except where noted.

1. "The Journey" – 3:37
2. "I Don't Want Your Money" – 2:58
3. "Hey Baby" – 3:22
4. "Mad Man Blues" – 2:39
5. "Bluebird" – 2:55
6. "Worried Life Blues" (Maceo Merriweather) – 3:00
7. "Apologize" – 2:57
8. "Lonely Boy Boogie" – 3:16
9. "Please Don't Go" (McKinley Morganfield) – 2:26
10. "Dreamin' Blues" – 3:02
11. "Hey Boogie" – 2:59
12. "Just Me and My Telephone" – 3:14
