= General Recorded Tape =

Defunct American tape manufacturer

- Type: Public
- Industry: Record label
- Founded: 1965; Sunnyvale, California
- Founder: Alan J. Bayley
- Defunct: 1979
- Fate: Liquidated and catalog sold
- Successor: WMG; UMG; DMG
- Headquarters: Los Angeles
- Total assets: US$6.6 million

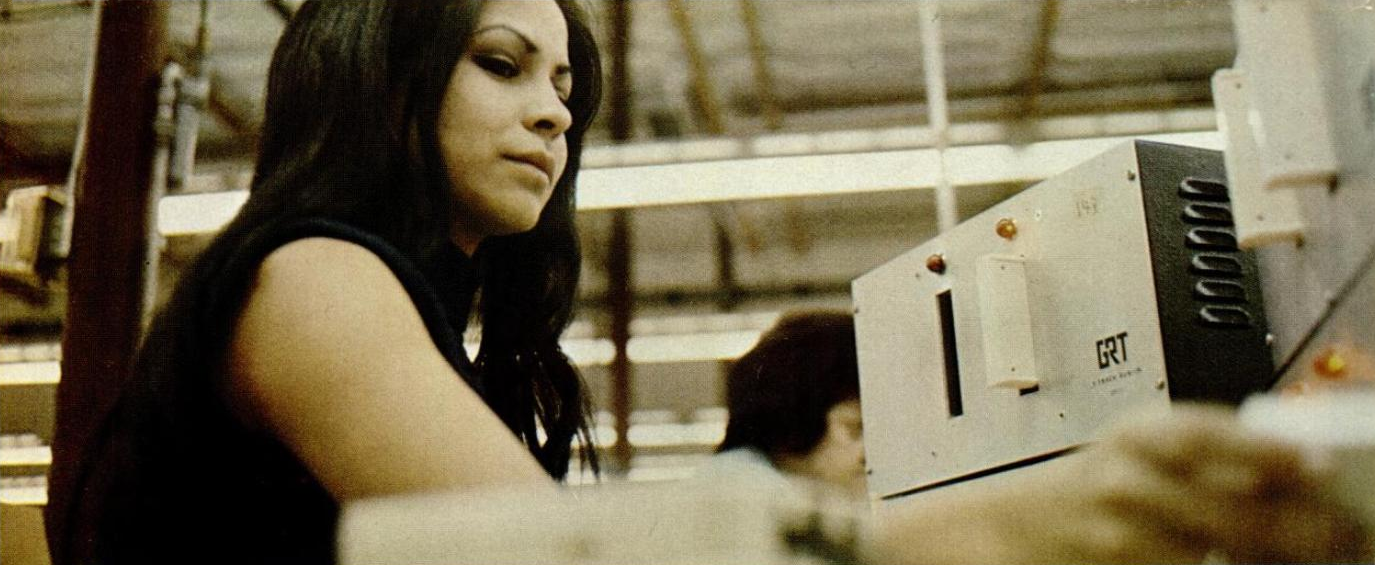
Veronica Herrera, at a GRT 8-track assembler, 1970

General Recorded Tape was an American manufacturer of reel to reel, 8-track and cassette tapes that existed between 1965 and 1979. The company grew to become the owner of several prominent U.S. record labels, including Chess Records and Janus Records.

== History ==
General Recorded Tape was founded in Sunnyvale, California in 1965 by Alan J. Bayley (1933–2010), who was also its president. General Recorded Tape developed in the 1960s to become a major manufacturer of tape-format music for many record labels. As of 1968, the company had duplication rights for 67 record labels, while it was estimated that 90% of retail outlets carried GRT tape products. At the time, the company was focused on the educational and industrial markets for its tape products, despite servicing a large number of record labels.

General Recorded Tape later grew to acquire major labels in its own right, such as Chess Records and Janus Records, and also released music under its own label, GRT Records. Its acquisition of Chess Records occurred in 1969, when the company paid Leonard Chess and Phil Chess $6.5 million and 20,000 shares of General Recorded Tape stock for all of the shares of Chess Records. Also in 1969, the company established a Canadian subsidiary, GRT Records, which became a major label in Canada during the 1970s. The company in 1969 also established a joint venture with Pye Records, based in England, to form Janus Records in the United States. In 1972, General Recorded Tape purchased Pye Records' interest in Janus Records and by 1976 reorganized its record production business around Janus Records. At the time, Janus Records proved to be particularly profitable for General Recorded Tape, due to Al Stewart's "Year of the Cat" achieving gold record status. Earlier, in 1974, General Recorded Tape had publicly denied rumours that it was in negotiations to merge with ABC Records. At the time, Bayley insisted that the product lines of General Recorded Tape had strengthened through licensing arrangements with Private Stock Records, which was owned by EMI Records and former executives of Bell Records.

The company went public in 1968. However, as early as 1970, General Recorded Tape, which became more commonly known as GRT, was encountering financial difficulties, significantly due to the general state of the economy and the lack of public interest at that time in recorded tape. Its shares declined from a high of over $25 in 1969 to less than $4, within a year. For the six months ended December 30, 1970, the company lost $3.9 million. The company had a joint venture arrangement with Blue Thumb Records, which it dissolved in 1970. Also in 1970, the company was compelled to withdraw a share issue, due to lack of market interest. To raise additional capital in response to market indifference, the company decided to sell and lease back its Los Angeles head office, as well as the Chess Records Chicago property it had acquired. At the time, there were market concerns related to the potential disposition of a significant block of shares of General Recorded Tape which were held by Newell Industries, a company with no evident familiarity with the music industry.

In April 1971, Alan J. Bayley announced that the company had received an additional $2,000,000 in debt financing, concurrently with significantly restructuring its operations. At the time, GRT had three record operations: Chess Records, Janus Records and GRT Records. Bayley announced that GRT had eliminated warehousing and most of its Chess Records operation in Chicago, as well as closing its GRT Records operation in Los Angeles. Instead, all record operations were to be consolidated in New York, under the GRT label. Shortly thereafter, the company's financial results were reported as significantly improved, which was attributed to the earlier restructuring. General Recorded Tape was nonetheless subject to profit erosion through tape bootlegging, with respect to which it acted to counter, as of 1971. Instead of its later record releases being referenced to the GRT label, as originally announced, the company began to refer to its Chess/Janus record operations.

In 1975, General Recorded Tape sold the remaining assets of Chess Records to All Platinum Records. The new owners of the Chess building found that approximately 250,000 Chess records had been abandoned, and destroyed them.

General Recorded Tape filed for Chapter 11 restructuring in 1979, owing $21 million, against an estimated $19 million in assets, and where approximately 6,000 creditors were listed. At the time, the company was estimated to have approximately two million units of recorded product (records and tape) in inventory. The company was subsequently declared bankrupt. Its largest secured creditor, Bank of America, recovered $5.5 million, while its unsecured creditors obtained marginal recovery. Its assets, notably its brand labels, were sold, and the company ceased to exist.
