= Beautiful Delilah =

Single by Chuck Berry

from the album More Chuck Berry (UK)
- B-side: "Vacation time"
- Released: 1958
- Recorded: June 12, 1958
- Genre: Rock 'n' Roll
- Length: 2:08
- Label: Chess Records
- Songwriter: Chuck Berry

Chuck Berry singles chronology
"Johnny B. Goode" (1958)	"Beautiful Delilah" (1958)	"Carol" (1958)

"Beautiful Delilah" is a single by American rock 'n' roll pioneer Chuck Berry released by Chess in 1958, with "Vacation Time" as its B-side. It reached number 81 on the Billboard Hot 100.

== Personnel ==
- Chuck Berry - vocals, guitar
- Paul Gayten - piano
- Willie Dixon - double bass
- Odie Payne - drums

== Charts ==
Weekly chart performance
Chart (1958)	Peak position
US Billboard Hot 100	81

== Other versions ==
The Kinks covered the song as the opening track of their 1964 debut album.

The Rolling Stones covered the song in 1964 on the BBC's Saturday Club, released in 2017 on their live album On Air. They covered it again as the closing track of their 2026 studio album Foreign Tongues. Mark Deming of AllMusic described the Stones' 2026 rendition as "stripped down to an acoustic country blues".
