= Little Queenie =

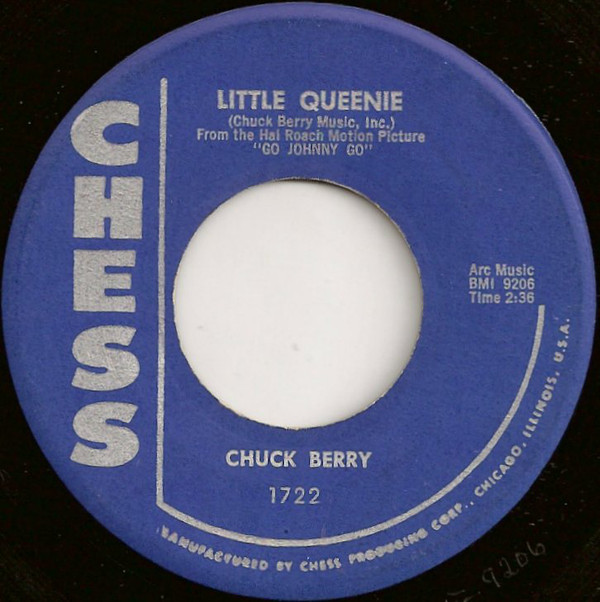

Single by Chuck Berry

from the album Berry Is on Top
- A-side: "Almost Grown" (double A-side)
- Released: March 1959
- Recorded: 19 November 1958
- Studio: Chess (Chicago)
- Genre: Rock and roll
- Length: 2:36
- Label: Chess
- Songwriter: Chuck Berry
- Producers: Leonard Chess, Phil Chess

Chuck Berry singles chronology
"Anthony Boy" (1959)	"Little Queenie" / "Almost Grown" (1959)	"Back in the U.S.A." (1959)

"Little Queenie" is a song written and recorded by Chuck Berry. Released in March 1959 as a double A-side single with "Almost Grown", it was included on Berry Is on Top (1959), Berry's first compilation album. He performed the song in the movies Go, Johnny Go! (1959) and Hail! Hail! Rock 'n' Roll (1987). One year earlier, Berry had released "Run Rudolph Run", a Christmas song with the same melody.

== Background ==
The song was recorded on November 19, 1958, in Chicago, Illinois. Backing Berry on vocals and guitar were either Johnnie Johnson or Lafayette Leake on piano, Willie Dixon on bass, and Fred Below on drums. In a song review for AllMusic, Matthew Greenwald calls it an "incredible rock & roll anthem" and "one of the greatest dance/sex ritualistic classics." It is included on several of Berry's compilation albums, including The Great Twenty-Eight and Chuck Berry's Golden Decade.

== Chart performance ==
The song peaked at number 80 on the Billboard Hot 100 chart.

== Other versions ==
It has been covered by many artists, including:

- Jerry Lee Lewis recorded a version in 1959 and it was released on Sun Records. Keith Richards joined Jerry in performing the song on the American television series Salute!, July 16, 1983
- The Beatles, who according to Mark Lewisohn in The Complete Beatles Chronicles, performed "Little Queenie" live from at least 1960 until 1963 in Liverpool, Hamburg and elsewhere with Paul McCartney on lead vocal. An audience recording from December 1962 is included on Live! at the Star-Club in Hamburg, Germany; 1962. Author Doug Sulpy in Drugs, Divorce and Slipping Image notes during the lengthy sessions for the album Get Back, John Lennon sang the lead vocal on a fairly brief version of it.
- The Rolling Stones frequently performed the song live; a version recorded in November 1969 at Madison Square Garden is on the album Get Yer Ya-Ya's Out! It is also on the Stones bootleg Live'r Than You'll Ever Be. Their version reached number 11 on the Tio i Topp chart in Sweden.
- A version by the Easybeats, recorded circa 1965, was released on The Shame Just Drained in 1977.
- In 1972, REO Speedwagon recorded for their second album, R.E.O./T.W.O..

== Song influence ==
- English glam-rock band T-Rex's Marc Bolan, discussing their hit "Bang a Gong (Get It On)", "claimed to have written the song out of his desire to record Chuck Berry's "Little Queenie", and said that the riff is taken from the Berry tune. In fact, a slightly edited line ("And meanwhile, I'm still thinking") from "Little Queenie" is said at the fade of "Get It On".
- The first line of the chorus can be heard at the beginning of the fade out to the 1974 Queen hit "Now I'm Here".
