= The Baroques =

American rock band (1966–1968)

- Also known as: The Complete Unknowns
- Origin: Milwaukee, Wisconsin, United States
- Genres: Psychedelic rock; garage rock; baroque pop
- Years active: 1966–1968
- Label: Chess
- Past members: Rick Bieniewski; Jacques Hutchinson; Dean Nimmer; Wayne Will; Jay Borkenhagen

The Baroques were an American rock band formed in Milwaukee, Wisconsin in 1966. The band reached regional success for their transition from garage rock to the psychedelic rock genre, and the controversy aroused from their single, "Mary Jane". The group released one studio album before its disbandment in 1968.

== History ==
In 1966, the band formed as "The Complete Unknowns", with Rick Bieniewski on bass guitar, Jacques Hutchinson on lead guitar and vocals, and Dean Nimmer and Wayne Will both playing the drums. The band began as a garage rock band playing the popular songs associated with the genre during the period. Following their first tour in Wisconsin, Will was drafted to fight in the Vietnam War, so the band replaced him with multi-instrumentalist Jay Borkenhagen. With the new member, the band shifted their musical identity to accompass psychedelic rock, and changed the group name to The Baroques. The band became notable for its baroque-like keyboards, fuzz guitar riffs, and outright freak-out jams.

The band's live performances drew the attention of Chess Records in January 1967. The label, primarily known for releasing blues and R&B material, signed the band in an effort to incorporate a new marketing opportunity. The band went to record their debut single in Ter Mar Studios, located in Chicago. The single, both conceived of original material by Borkenhagen, was produced by Ralph Bass. In June 1967, the band released their debut single, "Mary Jane" b/w "Iowa, A Girl's Name", which was banned by locals radio stations within a week of the release for perceived pro-drug references. In reality, there were no pro-drug references and the A-side, "Mary Jane", was intended as an anti-drug statement. The controversy brought regional acclaim for the band, and they became known for their eccentric live performances. Following the banning of their single, the band released their only LP, The Baroques, which included the two songs from the single. The album became a regional hit, but the band was unable to branch out of state as Chess was not well-known to distribute rock albums, let alone psychedelic rock. Still, the band was at its peak of popularity and was performing in an increased amount of gigs, but Chess Records dropped them from their label. One final self-financed effort was produced in 1968. "I Will Not Touch You & "Remember" was released as a single, but with the limited marketing, the single only reached regional acclaim. The band disbanded later that year.

Jay Borkenhagen went on to California and recorded an LP in the 1970s with a band called Feather. Jacques Hutchinson became a professor of communication at the University of Colorado. Dean Nimmer became an art professor at Massachusetts College of Art. Rick Bieniewski became a traveling salesman.

In 1989, an archival self-released compilation LP was issued. "Baroques" contained 1 track from the Chess LP, and 12 previously unreleased tracks from their early 1967 demos & 1968 recordings. In January 1995, a compilation album called Purple Day was released on the Distortion label that was arranged with the help of the past band members. The compilation includes 9 of the tracks from their Chess album along with demo tracks & outtakes previously issued on the 1989 LP. In 1997, "Mary Jane" was re-released on the psychedelic rock compilation, Psychedelic Crown Jewels, Vol. 1. 2017 saw a limited edition deluxe coloured vinyl reissue of the Chess album by Sundazed Music, featuring the album's mono mix and original artwork.

== Discography ==
=== Album ===
- The Baroques (Chess, 1967)
