= Almost Grown (song) =

Single by Chuck Berry

from the album Berry Is on Top
- B-side: "Little Queenie"
- Released: March 1959
- Recorded: February 17, 1959
- Studio: Chess (Chicago)
- Genre: Rock and roll, rhythm & blues
- Length: 2:21
- Label: Chess
- Songwriter: Chuck Berry
- Producers: Leonard Chess, Phil Chess

"Almost Grown" is a song written and recorded by Chuck Berry. It was released as a double A-side with "Little Queenie".

== Background ==
The song was released as Chess single 1722, and was later notable when featured in the 1973 film American Graffiti, and on its soundtrack album.

== Recording ==
The song was recorded on February 17, 1959, at Chess Studios in Chicago, Illinois.

- Chuck Berry, vocals and guitar
- Johnnie Johnson on piano
- Willie Dixon on bass
- Fred Below on drums
- The background vocals on Berry's recording are by Etta James and The Marquees aka Harvey & the New Moonglows, featuring the young Marvin Gaye.

== Chart performance ==
The song reached number thirty-two on the Billboard Hot 100 chart and number three on the Billboard R&B chart.

Chart (1959)	Peak position
US Billboard Hot 100	32
US Billboard Hot R&B Sides	3

== Covers ==
- The song was covered by The Animals on their 1963 album of the same name.
- Australian band Ol' 55 covered the song on their album Take It Greasy (1976).
- French version by Eddy Mitchell called "C'est la vie, mon chéri" on his album Rocking in Nashville (1974)
- The song has also been covered by The Ivy League and David Bowie.
