= Thirty Days (Chuck Berry song) =

"Thirty Days (To Come Back Home)"

Single by Chuck Berry

from the album Rock, Rock, Rock!
- B-side: "Together (We Will Always Be)"
- Released: September 1955
- Recorded: September 1955
- Studio: Universal Recording Corp. (Chicago)
- Genre: Rock and roll
- Length: 2:23
- Label: Chess 1610
- Songwriter: Chuck Berry
- Producers: Leonard Chess, Phil Chess

Chuck Berry singles chronology
"Wee Wee Hours" (1954)	"Thirty Days (To Come Back Home)" (1955)	"No Money Down" (1956)

"Thirty Days (To Come Back Home)", also written "30 Days", is a 1955 song and chart single by Chuck Berry. Berry wrote "30 Days" to pay tribute to Hank Williams' country music.

== Covers ==
The song has been covered by many artists, including:

- Ernest Tubb, 1955
- Ronnie Hawkins & the Hawks as "Forty Days", 1959 (#4 Canada, July 6, 1959)
- Cliff Richard & the Shadows as "Forty Days", 1961
- Bill Black and His Combo, 1964
- The Tractors, 1995
