= The London Chuck Berry Sessions =

Studio album / Live album by Chuck Berry
- Released: June 1972
- Recorded: 1972
- Venues: Lanchester Arts Festival, Coventry, England
- Studios: Pye, London
- Genre: Rock and roll
- Length: 44:08
- Label: Chess
- Producer: Esmond Edwards

Chuck Berry chronology
San Francisco Dues (1971)	The London Chuck Berry Sessions (1972)	Bio (1973)

London Sessions chronology
The London Muddy Waters Sessions (1972)	The London Chuck Berry Sessions (1972)	The London Bo Diddley Sessions (1973)

Singles from The London Chuck Berry Sessions
- 1. "My Ding-a-Ling" Released: June 1972; 2. "Reelin' and Rockin'" Released: November 1972

The London Chuck Berry Sessions is the sixteenth studio album by Chuck Berry, released by Chess Records in October 1972 on LP, 8 track cartridge, and audio cassette. Side one of the album consists of studio recordings, engineered by Geoff Calver; side two features three live performances recorded by the Pye Mobile Unit, engineered by Alan Perkins, on February 3, 1972, at the Lanchester Arts Festival in Coventry, England. At the end of the live section, the recording includes the sounds of festival management trying in vain to get the audience to leave so that the next performers, Pink Floyd, can take the stage; the crowd begins chanting "We want Chuck!" His backing band for that concert included Onnie McIntyre (guitar), Robbie McIntosh (drums), Nic Potter (bass), and Dave Kaffinetti (piano). McIntosh and McIntyre would later form the Average White Band. The studio recordings included pianist Ian McLagan and drummer Kenney Jones from the bands the Small Faces and Faces.

"My Ding-a-Ling", from the live side of the album, was edited to approximately 4 minutes for release as a single. A novelty song based around sexual double entendres, it reached number 1 in both the US and the UK, Berry's only chart-topper in either country.

== Background ==
In May 1970, Howlin' Wolf traveled to Olympic Sound Studios in London, England, to record songs for The London Howlin' Wolf Sessions. The album was released in August 1971 and peaked at number 28 on Billboard magazine's R&B Albums chart and number 79 on the Billboard 200. Because of Wolf's success, Muddy Waters recorded his own London Sessions album in December 1971, and Berry did the same in 1972.

== Critical reception ==
Professional ratings
Review scores
Source	Rating
AllMusic	3/5 stars
Christgau's Record Guide	C−
The Rolling Stone Record Guide	2/5 stars
Select	3/5 medals

William Ruhlmann of AllMusic retrospectively called the album Chuck Berry's "commercial, if not artistic, peak". Robert Christgau gave the album a C minus, calling the record lousy. He dubbed the studio side "pure filler" and criticised Berry's vocal performance on the live side as hoarse.

== Commercial performance ==
The album was not even out for a month, when on October 27, 1972, The London Chuck Berry Sessions was certified gold by the Recording Industry Association of America with sales of 1,000,000 units. It is Berry's only album to be certified by the RIAA, and is his most successful release.

== Track listing ==
All songs written by Chuck Berry except as noted

Side one (studio recordings)

1. "Let's Boogie" – 3:10
2. "Mean Old World" (Little Walter) – 5:45
3. "I Will Not Let You Go" – 2:49
4. "London Berry Blues" – 5:55
5. "I Love You" – 3:26

Side two (live recordings)

1. "Reelin' and Rockin'" – 7:07
2. "My Ding-a-Ling" (Dave Bartholomew) – 11:33
3. "Johnny B. Goode" – 4:23

The release on cassette exchanged "I Love You" and "Johnny B. Goode" to create sides of near-equal length.

This version of "Johnny B. Goode" replaces the first verse of the original with the first verse of "Bye Bye Johnny".

== Personnel ==
Musicians

- Chuck Berry – vocals, guitar
- Derek Griffiths – guitar (side one)
- Ian McLagan – piano (side one)
- Kenney Jones – drums (side one)
- Onnie Owen McIntyre – guitar (side two)
- Nic Potter – bass (side two)
- David Kaffinetti – piano (side two)
- Robbie McIntosh – drums (side two)

Technical

- Esmond Edwards – producer
- Bob Scerbo – production supervision
- Mia Krinsky – album coordination
- David Krieger – art director
- Tim Lewis – cover art

== Charts ==
=== Album ===
Chart (1972)	Peak position
US Billboard 200	8
US Billboard R&B Albums	8

=== US Singles ===
Year	Single	Chart	Position
1972	"My Ding-a-Ling"	Billboard Hot 100	1
1973	"Reelin' and Rockin'"	Billboard Hot 100	27

=== UK Singles ===
Year	Single	Chart	Position
1972	"My Ding-a-Ling"	Official Charts	1
1973	"Reelin' and Rockin'"	Official Charts	18

== Certifications ==
Region	Certification	Certified units/sales
United States (RIAA)	Gold	500,000^{^}
^{^} Shipments figures based on certification alone.
