= San Francisco Dues =

Studio album by Chuck Berry
- Released: September 1971
- Studio: Lansing Sound, Lansing, Michigan
- Genre: Rock and roll
- Length: 33:12
- Label: Chess
- Producer: Chuck Berry

Chuck Berry chronology
Back Home (1970)	San Francisco Dues (1971)	The London Chuck Berry Sessions (1972)

Professional ratings
Review scores
Source	Rating
AllMusic	2/5 stars
Christgau's Record Guide	B−

San Francisco Dues is the fifteenth studio album by Chuck Berry, released in 1971 by Chess Records.

== Overview ==
It was Chuck Berry's second Chess release after returning to the label in 1969. The album contains seven new songs, a poem and two songs ("Lonely School Days" and "Viva Rock and Roll") from his previous Chess recordings.

== Track listing ==
All songs written by Chuck Berry

1. "Oh Louisiana" – 4:28
2. "Let's Do Our Thing Together" – 2:20
3. "Your Lick" – 2:34
4. "Festival" – 4:08
5. "Bound to Lose" – 3:06
6. "Bordeaux in My Pirough" – 2:35
7. "San Francisco Dues" – 3:23
8. "Viva Rock and Roll" – 2:02
9. "My Dream" (Poem) – 6:00
10. "Lonely School Days" – 2:36

== Personnel ==
Musicians

- Chuck Berry – guitar, piano on "My Dream" (Poem), vocals
- Jeff Baldori – second guitar
- Bob Baldori – electric piano, harmonica
- Jack "Zocko" Groendal – bass guitar
- Johnnie Johnson – piano
- Bill Metros – drums
- Maurice White – drums

Technical

- Esmond Edwards – supervisor
- Dean Bredwell – engineer
- Michael Mendel – cover, design
