= Roll Over Beethoven =

Original song written and composed by Chuck Berry

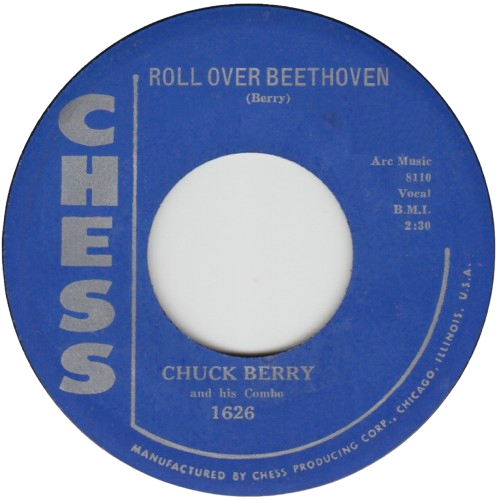
- A-side label of US single

Single by Chuck Berry
- B-side: "Drifting Heart"
- Released: May 1956
- Recorded: April 19, 1956
- Studio: Universal Recording Corp. (Chicago)
- Genre: Rock and roll
- Length: 2:23
- Label: Chess #1626
- Songwriter: Chuck Berry
- Producers: Leonard Chess, Phil Chess

Chuck Berry singles chronology
"No Money Down" (1955)	"Roll Over Beethoven" (1956)	"Too Much Monkey Business" (1956)

"Roll Over Beethoven" is a 1956 song written by Chuck Berry, originally released on Chess Records, with "Drifting Heart" as the B-side. The lyrics of the song mention rock and roll and the desire for rhythm and blues to be as respected as classical music. The song has been covered by many other artists, including the Rolling Stones and the Beatles (both in 1963). Rolling Stone magazine ranked it number 97 on its 2004 list of the "500 Greatest Songs of All Time".

== Inspiration and lyrics ==
According to Rolling Stone and Cub Koda of AllMusic, Berry wrote the song in response to his sister Lucy always using the family piano to play classical music when Berry wanted to play popular music. According to biographer Bruce Pegg, the song was "inspired in part by the rivalry between his sister Lucy's classical music training and Berry's own self-taught, rough-and-ready music preference".

In addition to the classical composers Ludwig van Beethoven and Pyotr Ilyich Tchaikovsky, the lyrics mention or allude to several popular artists: "Early in the Mornin'" is the title of a Louis Jordan song; "Blue Suede Shoes" refers to the Carl Perkins song; and "hey diddle diddle", from the nursery rhyme "The Cat and the Fiddle", is an indirect reference to the Chess recording artist Bo Diddley, who was an accomplished violin player. Although the lyrics mention "rocking" and "rolling", the music that the classics are supposed to step aside for is referred to as "rhythm and blues". The lyric "a shot of rhythm and blues" was appropriated as the title of a song recorded by Arthur Alexander and others.

== Recording ==
The song was recorded at Universal Recording Corporation in Chicago, Illinois on April 19, 1956.

- Chuck Berry, vocals and guitar
- Johnnie Johnson on piano
- Willie Dixon on bass
- Melvin Billups on drums

The session was produced by the Chess brothers, Leonard and Phil.

== Release ==
Berry's version was originally released as single 1626 by Chess Records in May 1956, with "Drifting Heart" as the B-side. It peaked at number two on the Billboard R&B chart and number 29 on the pop chart. "Roll Over Beethoven" and three other Berry songs were included on the album Rock, Rock, Rock, promoted as the soundtrack of the film of the same name, but only four of the 12 songs on the album were used in the film.

"Roll Over Beethoven" has been released numerous times on compilation albums, including Chuck Berry Twist and The Chess Box.

== Legacy ==
Berry's single was one of 50 recordings chosen in 2003 by the Library of Congress to be added to the National Recording Registry. In 2004, "Roll Over Beethoven" was ranked number 97 on Rolling Stone's list of "The 500 Greatest Songs of All Time". The accompanying review stated that it "became the ultimate rock & roll call to arms, declaring a new era".

Koda calls it a "masterpiece" that helped to define rock and roll.

In 1990, the 1956 recording of the song by Chuck Berry on Chess Records was inducted into the Grammy Hall of Fame.

== Cover versions ==
"Roll Over Beethoven" is one of the most widely covered songs in popular music – "a staple of rock and roll bands", according to Koda – with notable versions by Gene Vincent, Jerry Lee Lewis and Linda Gail Lewis (#12 Can), the Beatles, Carl Perkins, and Electric Light Orchestra.

=== The Beatles ===
"Roll Over Beethoven"
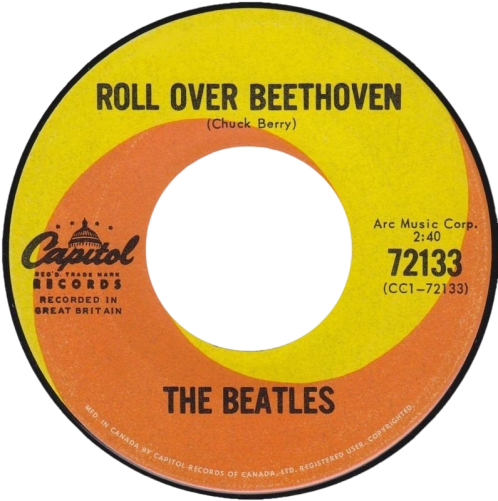
- 1963 Canadian single label

Song by the Beatles

from the album With the Beatles
- Released: 22 November 1963
- Recorded: 30 July 1963
- Venue: EMI, London
- Genre: Rock and roll
- Length: 2:48
- Label: Parlophone
- Songwriter: Chuck Berry
- Producer: George Martin

"Roll Over Beethoven" was a favourite of John Lennon, Paul McCartney, and George Harrison even before they chose "the Beatles" as their name, and they continued to perform it right into their American tours of 1964. Their version of "Roll Over Beethoven" was recorded on July 30, 1963, for their second British LP, With the Beatles, and features Harrison on vocals and guitar. In the United States, it was released April 10, 1964, as the opening track of The Beatles' Second Album, and on May 11, 1964, as the opening track of the second Capitol EP, Four by the Beatles. It was released by Capitol in Canada with "Please Mister Postman" as the B-side, reaching number 2 on the CHUM Charts. This release reached number 68 on the U.S. Billboard Hot 100 and number 30 on the Cash Box Singles chart. In Sweden, it peaked at number 11 on the Kvällstoppen Chart. In Australia, it peaked at number one, with "Hold Me Tight" as the B-side, as did it in Denmark.

In 1994, the Beatles released a live version of "Roll Over Beethoven" on Live at the BBC. This version had been recorded on February 28, 1964, and broadcast on March 30, 1964, as part of a BBC series starring the Beatles called From Us to You. This version of "Roll Over Beethoven" was used in the film Superman III, directed by Richard Lester, who also directed the Beatles' first two films, A Hard Day's Night and Help!. In 1995, a live version from an October 1963 performance at the Karlaplansstudion in Stockholm was released on Anthology 1.

==== Personnel ====
- George Harrison – double-tracked vocals, lead guitar, handclaps
- John Lennon – rhythm guitar, handclaps
- Paul McCartney – bass, handclaps
- Ringo Starr – drums, handclaps

==== Charts ====
Chart performance for "Roll Over Beethoven"
Chart (1964)	Peak position
US Billboard Hot 100	68

=== Electric Light Orchestra ===
"Roll Over Beethoven"

Single by Electric Light Orchestra

from the album ELO 2
- B-side: "Queen of the Hours"
- Released: 12 January 1973 (UK); 27 January 1973 (US)
- Recorded: September 8, 1972
- Studio: AIR, London
- Genre: Progressive rock, glam rock
- Length: 8:09 (US album version); 7:03 (UK album version); 4:32 (Single version); 3:42 (US promo single version)
- Label: Harvest
- Songwriter: Chuck Berry/Ludwig van Beethoven
- Producer: Jeff Lynne

Electric Light Orchestra singles chronology
"10538 Overture" (1972)	"Roll Over Beethoven" (1973)	"Showdown" (1973)

ELO 2 track listing
- 5 tracks Side one: 1. "In Old England Town (Boogie No. 2)"; 2. "Momma"; 3. "Roll Over Beethoven"; Side two: 4. "From the Sun to the World (Boogie No. 1)"; 5. "Kuiama"

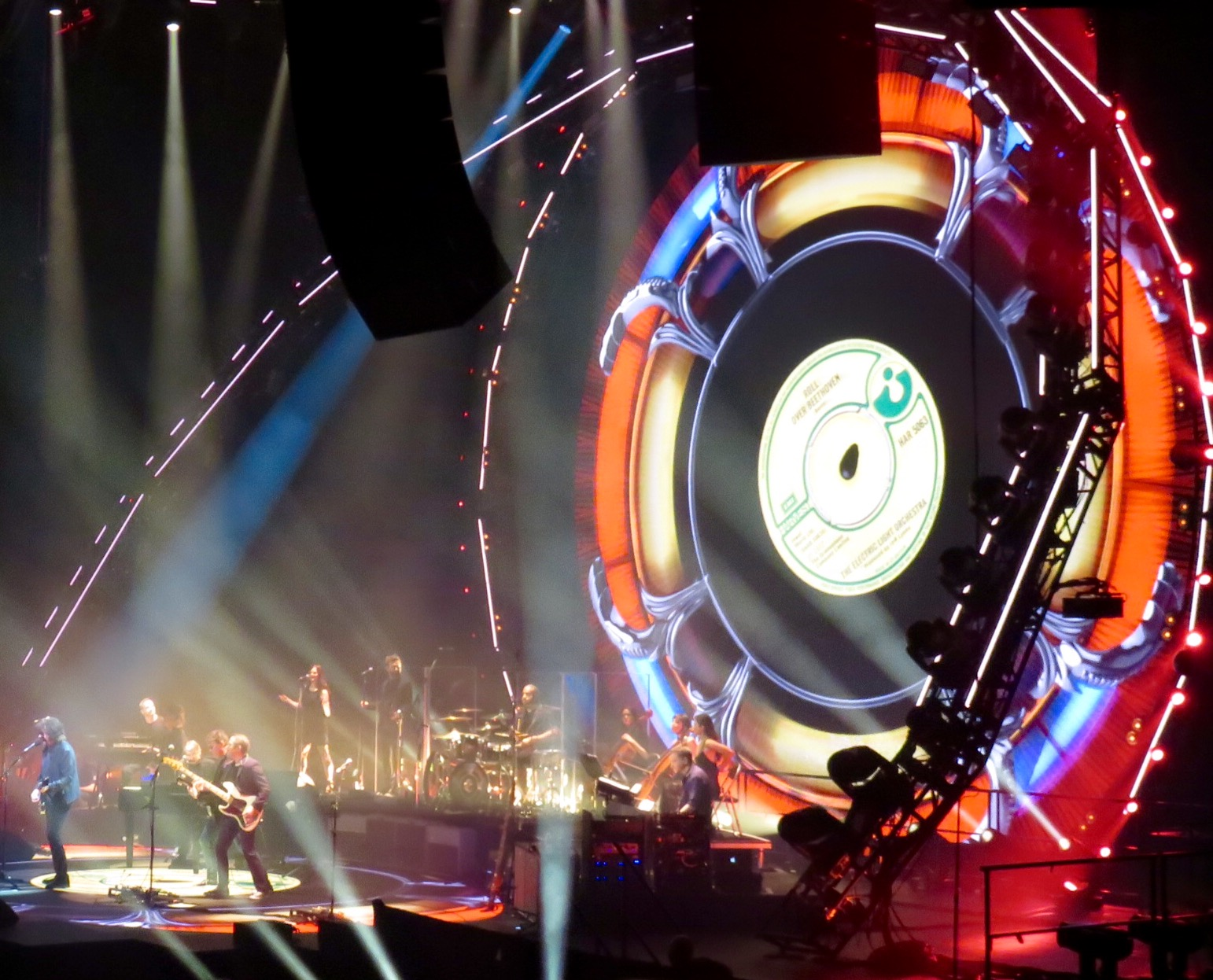
Jeff Lynne's ELO performing "Roll Over Beethoven" at the Genting Arena

Electric Light Orchestra's (ELO) elaborate eight-minute reworking of "Roll Over Beethoven", on the album ELO 2 in 1973, included an opening musical quote from Beethoven's Fifth Symphony and interpolations of material from the symphony's first movement into Berry's song and Peter Gunn theme in the background. This became one of ELO's signature songs and has been used to close the majority of their concerts. It is also the most-performed song by the band. "Roll Over Beethoven" was the second single released by the band, in January 1973, and became their second consecutive top ten hit in the UK. An edited version of the track from ELO 2 was a #42 hit in the United States.

Chicago radio superstation WLS, which gave the song much airplay, ranked "Roll Over Beethoven" as the 89th most popular hit of 1973. It reached as high as number 8 (for two weeks) on their surveys of September 1 and 8, 1973. The song reached number six on the competing station WCFL.

==== Chart performance ====
===== Weekly charts =====
Chart (1973)	Peak position
Australia KMR	53
Canada RPM Top Singles	19
Dutch GfK chart	19
German Media Control Singles Chart	22
UK Singles Chart	6
U.S. Billboard Hot 100	42
U.S. Cash Box Top 100	48
U.S. Record World	31

===== Year-end charts =====
Chart (1973)	Rank
Canada	167
U.S. (Joel Whitburn's Pop Annual)	250

=== The Rolling Stones ===
On 26 October 1963, the Rolling Stones performed "Roll Over Beethoven" on the BBC radio show Saturday Club. This recording was officially released on the album On Air in 2017.

=== Narvel Felts ===
Narvel Felts covered the song in 1982. His version went to number 64 on the Hot Country Singles chart in 1982.

=== Paul Shaffer and the World's Most Dangerous Band ===
In 1992, Paul Shaffer and the World's Most Dangerous Band, the longtime house band for David Letterman, released a cover of the song that was featured for the soundtrack for the family comedy film Beethoven, which was also the name of the titular St. Bernard.
