= School Days (Chuck Berry song) =

Single by Chuck Berry

from the album After School Session
- B-side: "Deep Feeling"
- Released: March 1957
- Recorded: January 21, 1957
- Studio: Universal Recording Corp. (Chicago)
- Genre: Rock and roll
- Length: 2:40
- Label: Chess 1653
- Songwriter: Chuck Berry
- Producers: Leonard and Phil Chess

Chuck Berry singles chronology
"You Can't Catch Me" (1956)	"School Days" (1957)	"Oh Baby Doll" (1957)

"School Days" (also known as "School Day (Ring! Ring! Goes the Bell)") is a rock-and-roll song written and recorded by Chuck Berry and released by Chess Records as a single in March 1957 and on the LP After School Session two months later (see 1957 in music). It is one of his best-known songs and is often considered a rock-and-roll anthem.

The last verse of the song contains the lyrics "Hail, hail rock and roll / Deliver me from the days of old." Hail! Hail! Rock and Roll became the title of a 1987 concert film and documentary about Berry; the song itself is also commonly mistitled as Hail Hail Rock and Roll. Much of the song's musical arrangement was reused by Berry in 1964 in "No Particular Place to Go". A similar arrangement, though quite different, was also used for "Big Ben".

== Recording ==
Berry recorded the song on January 21, 1957, at Universal Recording Corporation in Chicago, Illinois. The sessions were produced by the Chess brothers, Leonard and Phil.

- Chuck Berry – vocals, guitar
- Johnnie Johnson – piano
- Hubert Sumlin (known for his work with Howlin' Wolf) – guitar
- Willie Dixon – bass
- Fred Below – drums

== Charts ==
Berry's record peaked at number 3 on the Billboard Hot 100 chart (his third highest-ranked pop hit) and hit number one on the R&B Best Sellers chart. It was also his first appearance on the UK Singles Chart, reaching number 24.

== Cover versions ==
A 1957 British cover version by Don Lang and His Frantic Five reached number 26 in the UK. The song was covered by Jan & Dean on their 1964 album Dead Man's Curve / The New Girl In School, under the title "School Day". On December 22, 1963, the song was tracked at Western Recorders. In 1966, the duo's version, retitled "School Day (Ring! Ring! Goes the Bell)", was released on a single by Liberty Records as the B-side of a reissue of "The New Girl in School". It charted at number 71 in Canada's RPM 100.

The Australian hard rock band AC/DC recorded a version of "School Days" for their second album, T.N.T. It was originally released only in Australia, but in 1997 it was released internationally on Volts, a compilation of songs sung by Bon Scott, as part of the box set Bonfire.

Lil Rob remade the song, retitled "Street Dayz", for his album The Album, adding a skit and replacing the school-related lyrics with references to gang life, drugs, and sex.

A version of "School Days" was included on The Simpsons album The Simpsons Sing the Blues, with vocals from Buster Poindexter and the cartoon character Bart Simpson, and featured a lead guitar solo by Joe Walsh.

Elvis Presley's orchestra often played a version of "School Days" in concert in the last years of his life as an instrumental as Elvis introduced the members of his ensemble. Record releases of this performance were often mistitled "Hail Hail Rock and Roll."
