= Back Home (Chuck Berry album) =

Studio album by Chuck Berry
- Released: November 1970
- Recorded: November 21, 1969; April 27, 1970; September 1970
- Studio: Ter Mar, Chicago
- Genre: Rock and roll
- Length: 30:09
- Label: Chess
- Producer: Chuck Berry

Chuck Berry chronology
Concerto in B. Goode (1969)	Back Home (1970)	San Francisco Dues (1971)

Singles from Back Home
- 1. "Tulane" Released: August 1970

Professional ratings
Review scores
Source	Rating
AllMusic	3/5 stars
Christgau's Record Guide	B

Back Home is the fourteenth studio album by Chuck Berry, released in 1970 by Chess Records. The album title refers to his return to Chess after several years with Mercury Records.

== Track listing ==
All tracks are written by Chuck Berry.

No.	Title	Length
1.	"Tulane"	2:39
2.	"Have Mercy Judge"	2:40
3.	"Instrumental"	2:47
4.	"Christmas"	3:27
5.	"Gun"	2:45
6.	"I'm a Rocker"	4:34
7.	"Flyin' Home"	4:17
8.	"Fish and Chips"	2:50
9.	"Some People"	4:10
Total length:		30:09

2010 Japanese re-release
No.	Title	Length
10.	"Untitled Instrumental"	4:48
11.	"My Ding-a-Ling"	3:45
12.	"Gun" (Instrumental – Fast)	2:10
13.	"Gun" (Instrumental – Slow)	2:41
14.	"That's None of Your Business"	2:22
15.	"My Pad" (Poem)	6:26
Total length:		52:21

== Personnel ==
- Chuck Berry – guitar, vocals
- Bob Baldori – harmonica, piano (overdubs)
- Lafayette Leake – piano
- Phil Upchurch – bass guitar

Technical

- Malcolm Chisholm – engineer
- Peter Amft – photography

== Cover versions ==
"Tulane" was covered by the Steve Gibbons Band in 1977, reaching number 12 on the UK Singles Chart and spending eight weeks in the Top 40. It was also covered by Joan Jett and the Blackhearts on their 1988 album Up Your Alley and by Chris Smither on his 1991 album Another Way to Find You.

"I'm a Rocker" was covered by the British rock group Slade for their 1979 album Return to Base and it was the 'inspiration' for AC/DC's "Rocker" on 1975's T.N.T.

"Christmas" was covered by Clarence Spady; it was released on 11/5/21 as a digital single.
