= Wee Wee Hours =

Song recorded by Chuck Berry in 1955

Single by Chuck Berry
- A-side: "Maybellene"
- Released: 1955
- Recorded: May 21, 1955
- Studio: Universal Recording Corp. (Chicago)
- Genre: Blues
- Length: 3:02
- Label: Chess 1604
- Songwriter: Chuck Berry
- Producers: Leonard Chess, Phil Chess

Chuck Berry singles chronology
"I Hope These Words Will Find You Well" (1954)	"Wee Wee Hours" (1955)	"Thirty Days" (1955)

"Wee Wee Hours" is a song written and recorded by Chuck Berry in 1955. Originally released as the B-side of his first single, "Maybellene", it went on to become a hit, reaching number 10 in the Billboard R&B chart.

The song is a twelve-bar blues, described as "a slow, sensuous blues featuring some exceptional piano from Johnnie Johnson". "Wee Wee Hours" was on the audition tape submitted by Berry to Leonard Chess in hope of landing a recording contract with Chess Records. Although it seemed like a good fit with the record company's blues roster, Chess was more interested in the song that became "Maybellene", the song that launched Berry's career as a rock and roll star.

Berry often performed the song live. It is included on the 1969 album Chuck Berry Live in Concert, and in the 1987 film Hail! Hail! Rock 'n' Roll.
