= Jo Jo Gunne (song) =

Song by Chuck Berry

"Jo Jo Gunne" is a rock song by Chuck Berry that appeared on his third album, Berry Is on Top.

== Narrative ==
The song's narrative focuses on a monkey who tricks a lion and an elephant into fighting each other, to the entertainment of the rest of the animals in the jungle. This story is inspired by an African American folktale called the signifying monkey, which is itself derived from trickster figure in Yoruban mythology.

== Reception ==
The American hard rock band Jo Jo Gunne and their self-titled album are named after the song.

Rock guitarist Keith Richards gave his second son Tara "Jo Jo Gunne" as a middle name.
