= Maybellene =

1955 single by Chuck Berry

Single by Chuck Berry
- B-side: "Wee Wee Hours"
- Released: July 1955
- Studio: Universal Recording (Chicago)
- Genre: Rock and roll; rockabilly; rhythm and blues
- Length: 2:19
- Label: Chess
- Songwriter: Chuck Berry
- Producers: Leonard Chess, Phil Chess

Chuck Berry singles chronology
"I Hope These Words Will Find You Well" (1954)	"Maybellene" (1955)	"Thirty Days" (1955)

Audio sample
- 30-second sample of Chuck Berry's "Maybellene": file; help

"Maybellene" is a rock and roll song by American artist Chuck Berry, adapted in part from the western swing fiddle tune "Ida Red". Released in 1955, Berry’s song tells the story of a hot rod race and a broken romance, the lyrics describing a man driving a V8 Ford and chasing his unfaithful girlfriend in her Cadillac Coupe DeVille. It was released in July 1955 as a single by Chess Records, of Chicago, Illinois. Berry's first hit, "Maybellene" is considered a pioneering rock and roll song. Rolling Stone magazine wrote of it, "Rock & roll guitar starts here." The record was an early instance of the complete rock and roll package: youthful subject matter; a small, guitar-driven combo; clear diction; and an atmosphere of unrelenting excitement.

The song was a major hit with both black and white audiences, reaching number 1 on Billboard's Rhythm and Blues chart and number 5 on the Popular Records chart. It has received numerous honors and awards. Soon after its initial release, cover versions were recorded by several other artists. The title is misspelled "Maybelline" on several releases.

== Origins and writing ==
"Maybellene" adapted parts of the Western Swing song "Ida Red", as recorded by Bob Wills and his Texas Playboys in 1938. According to Berry, Wills's version, an uptempo dance number, was his favorite song to sing at racially integrated clubs ("salt and pepper clubs", as he called them). Encouraged by Muddy Waters, in 1955 Berry brought to Chess Records a recording of Wills's song, renamed "Ida May" and a blues song he wrote, "Wee Wee Hours", which he said was inspired by Big Joe Turner's "Wee Baby Blue". To Berry's surprise, Leonard Chess showed little interest in the blues material but was enthusiastic about the commercial possibilities in a "hillbilly song sung by a black man".

Chess wanted a bigger beat for the song and added a bass and a maracas player to Berry's trio at the recording session. He also thought the titles "Ida Red" and "Ida May" were "too rural". Spotting a mascara box on the floor of the studio, according to Berry's pianist Johnnie Johnson, Chess said, "Well, hell, let's name the damn thing Maybellene", altering the spelling to avoid a suit by the cosmetic company (the song would be covered as "Maybelline" almost as often as with the altered spelling). The lyrics were rewritten, also at the direction of Chess. "The kids wanted the big beat, cars and young love," Chess recalled. "It was the trend and we jumped on it." According to Berry he abridged the song's lyrics (Chuck Berry quote:) "from memories of high school and trying to get girls to ride in my 1934 V-8 Ford", adding that "Maybellene" was his own choice as "Ida May"'s replacement title, Maybellene being a name he recalled from a third-grade reader in which it was the name of a cow.

As Chess had predicted, the lyrics appealed to teenagers fascinated by cars, speed, and sexuality. "Maybellene" was one of the first records to be a hit on the rhythm and blues, country and western, and pop charts. Featuring some classic Berry riffs, some blues-style picking on a guitar and Johnson's piano, which added a hummable rhythm to the steady backbeat, "Maybellene" was a pivotal song in the emergence of rock-and-roll. The fusion of a rhythm-and-blues beat with a rural country style was a catalyst for the emergence of rock-and-roll in the mid-1950s.

When Berry first saw a copy of the record, he was surprised that two other individuals, including DJ Alan Freed, had been given writing credit; that would entitle them to some of the royalties. After a court battle, Berry was able to regain full writing credit.

== Personnel ==
- Chuck Berry – vocals, guitar
- Johnnie Johnson – piano
- Willie Dixon – bass
- Jerome Green – maracas
- Ebby Hardy – drums

== Co-composers ==
In the 1950s, some record companies assigned publishing credits to disc jockeys and others who helped to promote a record, a form of payola by means of composer royalties. For this reason, the disc jockey Alan Freed received credit as a co-writer of "Maybellene". Robert Christgau's October 1972 essay on Berry suggests this was the case for Freed's publishing credit. Leonard Chess, in Christgau's words, "flipped" for Berry's "Maybellene" and "forwarded it to Alan Freed". "Having mysteriously acquired 25 percent of the writer's credit," Christgau writes, "Freed played 'Maybellene' quite a lot, and it became one of the first nationwide rock and roll hits."

Russ Fratto, who had loaned money to Chess, also received credit. (Some Chess insiders have said that Chess owed money to Fratto, a printer and stationer, for producing record labels. Other accounts describe Fratto as "a record distributor".) The Freed and Fratto credits, which do not appear on the original Chess single (see the photograph above), were withdrawn in 1986. However, as of 2014, these credits still appear on some reissues of Berry's recordings.

The first edition of Charlie Gillett's The Sound of the City: The Rise of Rock and Roll in 1970 erroneously identifies Fratto as a disc jockey and suggests that both Freed and Fratto were present at the recording session in Chicago in May 1955.

Bruce Pegg's Brown Eyed Handsome Man on the life and recording career of Berry identifies Fratto as the owner of Victory Stationery, a print shop next door to 4750 South Cottage Grove, the location of the first offices of Chess Records. Pegg identifies Victory Stationery's owner Fratto as "4750's landlord."

In an interview with Patrick William Salvo for Rolling Stone published in November 1972, Berry told Salvo that Freed "didn't sit down with me at all and write anything." "He [Freed] got that money solely for doing us some favors in those days," Berry told Salvo.

== Charts ==
In 1955, the song peaked at number five on the Billboard pop chart and was number one on the R&B chart. Billboard's year-end charts in 1955 ranked "Maybellene" number 3 on the Top R&B Records Retail Sales and Juke Box Plays charts.

The record sold one million copies by the end of 1955.

== Honors and awards ==
According to the Acoustic Music organization, "the song ushers in descending pentatonic double-stops, which becomes the essence of rock guitar".

In 1988, "Maybellene" was inducted into the Grammy Hall of Fame for its influence as a rock-and-roll record. The Rock and Roll Hall of Fame included "Maybellene" in its list of the "500 Songs That Shaped Rock and Roll" (also included are Berry's recordings of "Rock and Roll Music" and "Johnny B. Goode"). In 1999, National Public Radio included it in the "NPR 100", the one hundred most important American musical works of the 20th century, chosen by NPR music editors. The song is ranked number 18 on Rolling Stone's list of 500 Greatest Songs of All Time. In June 2026, CBS News included the song in its list of the 250 essential American songs of the past 250 years.

== Cover versions ==
"Maybelline"

Single by Johnny Rivers

from the album Here We Go Again!
- B-side: "Walk Myself on Home"
- Released: August 1964
- Recorded: 1964
- Genre: Rock and roll
- Length: 2:10
- Label: Imperial
- Songwriters: Chuck Berry, Russ Fratto, Alan Freed
- Producer: Lou Adler

Johnny Rivers singles chronology
"Baby Come Back" (1964)	"Maybelline" (1964)	"Mountain of Love" (1964)

Columbia Records released a version by Marty Robbins (21351), entitled "Maybelline", by the end of August 1955. His version was the number 13 "Most Played by Jockeys" in the country-and-western market by mid-October. and soon Columbia was touting it as one of its "Best Selling Folk Records". By November, it was noted that the record had "won considerable pop play". Other versions available in mid-October 1955 were by J. Long (Coral 61478), J. Lowe (Dot 15407), and R. Marterie (Mercury 70682) with the song listed as number 14 top selling in the nation.

Allmusic lists cover versions by more than 70 performers, including Elvis Presley, the Everly Brothers (as "Maybelline"), John Hammond, Simon & Garfunkel (in a medley with "Kodachrome"), George Jones and Johnny Paycheck, Carl Perkins (as "Maybelline"), Johnny Cash, Bubba Sparks, Foghat (as "Maybelline"), The Dovells, Gerry and the Pacemakers, Chubby Checker and Ted Nugent (as "Maybelline").

In 1964, a cover version by Johnny Rivers, entitled "Maybelline", reached number 12 on the Billboard Hot 100 and number 9 on RPM magazine's Top 40 Singles chart.

Also in 1964, The Syndicats featuring guitarist Steve Howe, who would later play for the band Yes, recorded and published their own cover version of the song.
