= Chess Records =

American record label (1950–1975)

- Parent company: Universal Music Group
- Founded: 1950
- Founder: Leonard Chess; Phil Chess
- Defunct: 1975
- Status: Defunct
- Distributor: Geffen/UMe (reissues)
- Genre: Various
- Country of origin: United States
- Location: Chicago, Illinois
- Official website: chessrecords.com

Chess Records was an American record company established in 1950 in Chicago, specializing in blues and rhythm and blues. It was the successor to Aristocrat Records, founded in 1947. It expanded into soul music, gospel music, early rock and roll, and jazz and comedy recordings, released on Chess and its subsidiary labels Checker and Argo/Cadet. The Chess catalogue is owned by Universal Music Group and managed by Geffen Records and Universal Music Enterprises.

Established and run by two Jewish immigrant brothers from what was then Poland, Leonard and Phil Chess, the company produced and released many singles and albums regarded as central to the rock music canon. The musician and critic Cub Koda described Chess as "America's greatest blues label".

Chess was based at several locations on the south side of Chicago, initially at 4750 South Cottage Grove Ave. The most famous was 2120 S. Michigan Avenue, from May 1957 to 1967, immortalized by the Rolling Stones in "2120 South Michigan Avenue", an instrumental recorded there during the group's first U.S. tour in 1964. In 1967, Chess relocated to a much larger building, the former home of Revere Camera Company at 320 E. 21st Street, the label's final Chicago home. Shortly before the death of Leonard Chess in 1969, the Chess brothers sold the company. The studio at 2120 South Michigan Avenue was designated a Chicago Landmark on May 16, 1990. In 1993 the building was purchased by Marie Dixon, the widow of Willie Dixon, and turned into a museum which opened in 1997. The building is now the home of Willie Dixon's Blues Heaven Foundation.

This record label is also known for the soundtrack of Rock, Rock, Rock!

== History ==
=== Chess brothers' company ===
The Chess Records logo, as featured on a Memphis Slim single

Leonard Chess bought a stake in Aristocrat Records in 1947 and slowly bought out other owners. The Chess brothers became the sole owners of the company in 1950 by buying out founder Evelyn Aron. They renamed the company Chess Records.

The first release from Chess was "My Foolish Heart", backed with "Bless You", by Gene Ammons, issued as a 78 RPM single in June 1950. It became the label's biggest hit of the year.

In 1951, the Chess brothers began an association with record producer Sam Phillips of the Memphis Recording Service (the forerunner of Sun Records). One of the most important recordings that Phillips gave to Chess was "Rocket 88", which topped Billboard magazine's R&B Records chart and was inducted into the Grammy Hall of Fame in 1998 in recognition of its influence on rock and roll. Upon release, the record was attributed to Jackie Brenston and His Delta Cats, but the band was actually called Ike Turner's Kings of Rhythm.

Sam Phillips also brought Howlin' Wolf, one of the most influential blues musicians of all time, to the label in 1951. Howlin' Wolf's first release with Chess was "Moanin' at Midnight"/"How Many More Years", which both charted on the Billboard R&B charts, reaching 4 and 10 respectively. He stayed with Chess until his death in 1976, releasing hits like "Smokestack Lightning", "I asked for Water", and "Spoonful".

Musicians such as Bo Diddley, Willie Dixon, Chuck Berry, Howlin' Wolf, Muddy Waters, and Buddy Guy released music under Chess that was influential in early rock and roll. Many songs released by Chess were later covered by rock artists including the Beatles, the Rolling Stones, Cream, Fleetwood Mac, Ten Years After, the Beach Boys and Eric Clapton.

In 1952, the brothers started Checker Records as an alternative label for radio play (radio stations had a policy of playing only a limited number of records from any one imprint). In December 1955, they launched a jazz and pop label, Marterry, a name created from the first names of Leonard and Phil's sons, Marshall and Terry. This was quickly renamed Argo Records, but the name was changed again in 1965 to Cadet Records to end confusion with an existing British spoken-word label.

In 1953, Leonard Chess and Gene Goodman set up Arc Music BMI, a publishing company, which published songs by many rhythm and blues artists.

In the mid-1950s, the Chess brothers received two doo-wop groups by Alan Freed, the Coronets and the Moonglows; the former group was not very popular but the latter achieved several major crossover hits including "Sincerely", which was inducted into the Grammy Hall of Fame in 2002. Several of Chess's releases gave a writing credit to Alan Freed.

During the 1950s, Leonard and Phil Chess handled most of the recording production themselves. They brought in producer Ralph Bass in 1960 to handle the gospel output and some of the blues singers. Bassist and songwriter Willie Dixon was also heavily involved in organizing blues sessions for the label and is now credited retroactively as a producer on some re-releases. During the 1960s, the company's A&R manager and chief producer for soul and R&B recordings was Roquel "Billy" Davis, who had previously worked with Motown founder Berry Gordy on songs for Jackie Wilson, Etta James, Marv Johnson and other early Motown releases.

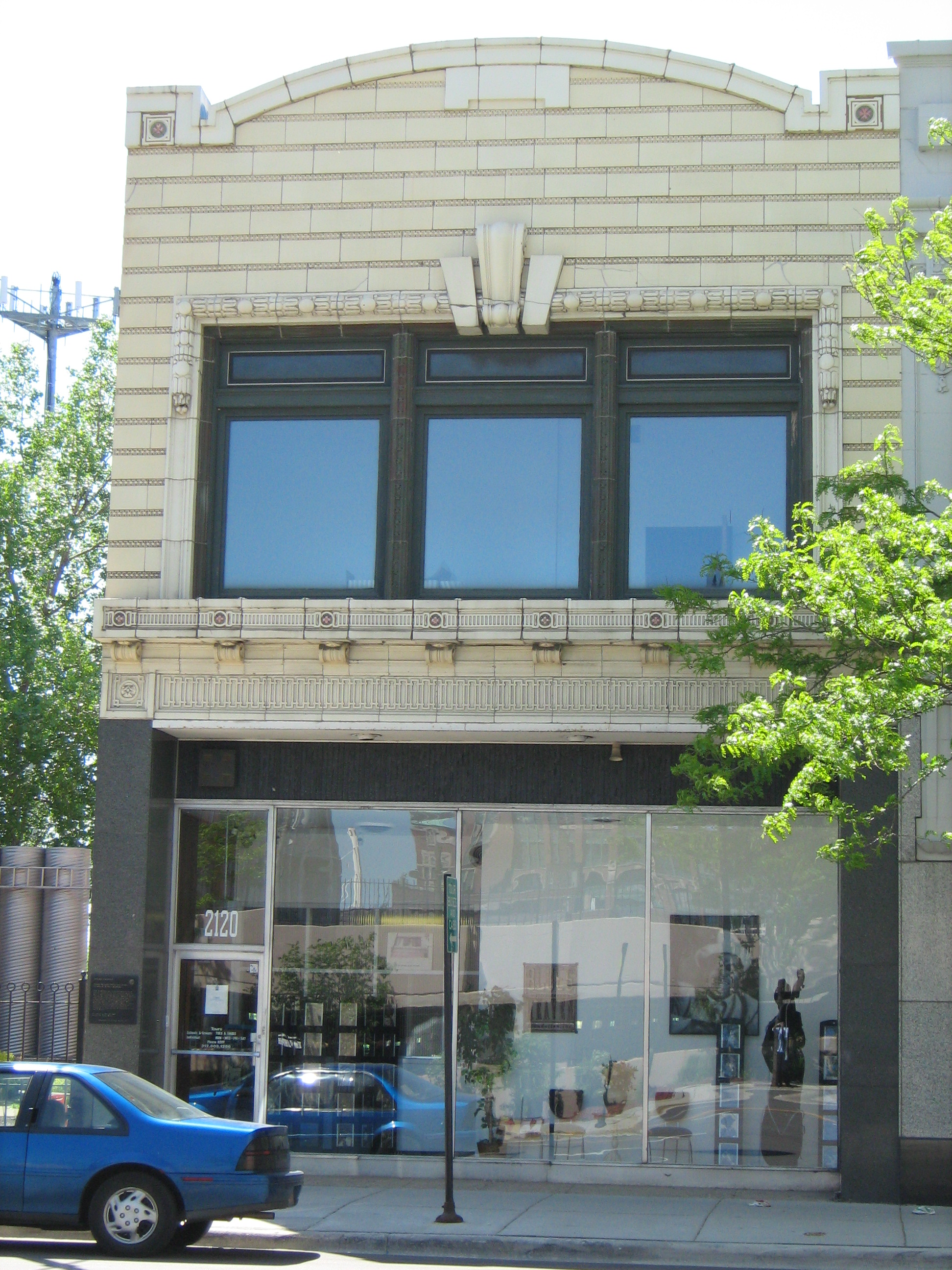
Chess Studios, 2120 South Michigan Ave., Chicago, later Willie Dixon's Blues Heaven Foundation (photo 2009)

In May 1957, the Chess brothers moved to a building at 2120 South Michigan Avenue in Chicago. The studio at 2120 was designed by audio engineer and business partner Jack Weiner. Opened in late 1957, it originally operated under the moniker of "Sheldon Recording Studios". Weiner moved out in 1959 and the studio was renamed "Ter-Mar Studios". "Ter-Mar" was an anagram of Leonard Chess' 2 sons names, Terry and Marshall. The studio would operate at this location until 1967 when they relocated to 320 East 21st Street.

In 1958, Chess began producing their first LP records which included such albums as After School Session by Chuck Berry, The Best of Muddy Waters, The Best of Little Walter, and Bo Diddley.

Chess Records was also known for its regular band of session musicians who played on most of the company's Chicago soul recordings, including the drummer Maurice White and the bassist Louis Satterfield, both of whom later shaped the funk group Earth, Wind & Fire; the guitarists Pete Cosey, Gerald Sims and Phil Upchurch; the pianist Leonard Caston, later a producer for Motown; and the organist Sonny Thompson. In 1962, Chess Records was sued by Peacock Records for recording their artists Reverend Robert Ballinger and the Five Blind Boys of Mississippi.

In 1969, Chess Records established a subsidiary label in the U.K., Middle Earth Records, which was distributed by Pye Records. The subsidiary specialized in psychedelic rock and was a joint venture with the Middle Earth Club in London. The Middle Earth label released only four albums and about a dozen singles before it closed in 1970.

Chess moved to a larger building in 1968, located at 320 East 21st Street in Chicago. The facility housed a pressing plant & new home for Ter-Mar Studios. The company was briefly run by Marshall Chess, Leonard's son, in his position as vice president between January and October 1969 and then as president following its acquisition by GRT, before he went on to found Rolling Stones Records.

=== Under GRT and All Platinum ===
In early 1969, the Chess brothers sold the label to General Recorded Tape (GRT) for $6.5 million. In October 1969, Leonard Chess died and by 1972, the only part of Chess Records still operating in Chicago was the recording studio, Ter-Mar Studios. Following the sale of Chess to GRT, Phil left the label to run radio station WVON. In the 1970s, Chess Records and its publishing arm, Arc Music, were successfully sued by Muddy Waters and Willie Dixon for nonpayment of royalties due to them. Howlin' Wolf sued Chess for $2.5 million, claiming he was defrauded of copyrights. The lawsuits settled with Wolf's case settling in 1976 after his death. Ter-Mar Studios continued to operate at the 320 E. 21st St. building until its closure in 1979.

Some of the other artists who contributed to the legacy of Chess Records were the Flamingos, the Moonglows, Fontella Bass, Billy Stewart, the Dells and the Ramsey Lewis Trio.

=== Later incarnations ===
In the early 1980s, noticing that much of the Chess catalogue was commercially unavailable, Marshall Chess was able to convince Joe and Sylvia Robinson, who ran All Platinum, to reissue the catalogue themselves under his supervision (All Platinum had been licensing selected tracks to other companies, which ultimately resulted in the disappearance of some original master tapes). The reissued singles and LPs sold well, but by the mid-80s All Platinum had fallen into financial difficulties, and the Chess master recordings were acquired by MCA Records, which itself was later merged with Geffen Records, a Universal Music imprint.

In the 1990s, MCA Records sued Charly Records for selling CDs which contained copyrighted material by Chess artists.

In February 1997, MCA started releasing eleven compilation albums for the 50th anniversary of Chess Records.

In the 2000s, Universal's limited-edition reissue label, Hip-O Select, began releasing a series of comprehensive box sets devoted to such Chess artists as Muddy Waters, Howlin' Wolf, Little Walter, Bo Diddley and Chuck Berry.

In July 2008, the 2008 Universal Studios fire burned down a warehouse filled with Universal Music Group recording masters, including many albums and songs released by Chess. These masters, by artists such as Chuck Berry, were "priceless" and irreplaceable; while UMG claimed at the time it had copies, later investigative reporting questioned this, with the truth emerging that all the masters were destroyed.

Chess Records was the subject of two films produced in 2008, Cadillac Records and Who Do You Love?. In addition to the Chess brothers, both films feature portrayals of or characters based on Willie Dixon, Muddy Waters, Little Walter, Chuck Berry, Howlin' Wolf and Etta James. Cadillac Records was directed by Darnell Martin and features an ensemble cast including Adrien Brody (as Leonard Chess), Mos Def (as Chuck Berry), Beyoncé Knowles (as Etta James) and Jeffrey Wright (as Muddy Waters). Who Do You Love was directed by Tony Award winner Jerry Zaks and stars Alessandro Nivola playing Leonard Chess "as a complicated, driven man, hard on both his musicians and his family, yet with a real love for some of America's greatest music." The world premiere of the latter film was at the Toronto International Film Festival, September 11, 2008.

== Discography ==
=== Chess LP-1425 to LPS-1553 (1956–1970) ===
The original Chess LP series started with LP-1425 and included albums on both the Chess and the Checker labels. After 1437, the series was used exclusively for the Chess label; the Checker label switched to a 2970 series.

Catalog No.	Album	Artist	Details
LP-1425	Rock, Rock, Rock	Various Artists	soundtrack album for the motion picture of the same name featuring The Moonglows, Chuck Berry and The Flamingos
LP-1426	After School Session	Chuck Berry	
LP-1427	The Best of Muddy Waters	Muddy Waters	
LP-1428	The Best of Little Walter	Little Walter	
LP-1429	Oh! Suzy-Q	Dale Hawkins	
LP-1430	Look! It's the Moonglows	The Moonglows	
LP-1431	Bo Diddley	Bo Diddley	
LP-1432	One Dozen Berrys	Chuck Berry	
LP-1433	The Flamingos	The Flamingos	released on Checker
LP-1434	Moanin' in the Moonlight	Howlin' Wolf	
LP-1435	Berry Is on Top	Chuck Berry	
LP-1436	Go Bo Diddley	Bo Diddley	released on Checker
LP-1437	Down and Out Blues	Sonny Boy Williamson	released on Checker
LP-1438	House of the Blues	John Lee Hooker	compiles tracks from 1951–52
LP-1439	Oldies in Hi-Fi	Various Artists	
LP/LPS-1440	Benny Rides Again	Benny Goodman	
LP-1441	Bunch of Goodies	Various Artists	
LP-1442	Soulful Saxophone	Gene Ammons	
LP-1443	In a German Beer Garden	Bob Kames at the Organ	
LP-1444	Muddy Waters Sings "Big Bill"	Muddy Waters	
LP-1445	Jug and Sonny	Gene Ammons and Sonny Stitt	
LP-1446	Walkin' by Myself...and Other Blues Hits of the Past	Various Artists	
LP-1447	The Funniest Woman in the World: Moms Mabley Onstage	Moms Mabley	
LP-1448	Rockin' at the Hops	Chuck Berry	
LP/LPS-1449	At Newport 1960	Muddy Waters	
LP-1450	Have I Had You Before?	Patsy Abbott	
LP-1451	The Trial	Pigmeat Markham	
LP-1452	Moms Mabley at the 'UN'	Moms Mabley	
LP-1453	The Loneliest Gal in Town	Little Miss Cornshucks	
LP-1454	John Lee Hooker Plays & Sings the Blues	John Lee Hooker	
LP-1455	Memphis Slim	Memphis Slim	
LP-1456	New Juke Box Hits	Chuck Berry	
LP-1457	Larry Williams	Larry Williams	
LP-1458	Murray the K's Golden Gassers	Various Artists	
LP-1459	Fun	Freddie & Flo Robinson	
LP-1460	"Moms" Mabley at the Playboy Club	Moms Mabley	
LP-1461	Murray the K's Blasts from the Past	Various Artists	
LP-1462	Pigmeat at the Party	Pigmeat Markham	
LP-1463	Moms Mabley at Geneva Conference	Moms Mabley	
LP-1464	Jimmy McCracklin Sings	Jimmy McCracklin	
LP-1465	Chuck Berry Twist	Chuck Berry	also released as More Chuck Berry
LP-1467	Anything Goes with Pigmeat	Pigmeat Markham	
LP-1468	Big Bill Broonzy and Washboard Sam	Big Bill Broonzy / Washboard Sam	split album
LP-1469	Howlin' Wolf	Howlin' Wolf	
LP-1470	Murray the K's Gassers for Submarine Race Watchers	Various Artists	
LP-1471	The Best of Bobby Lester and the Moonglows	Bobby Lester and the Moonglows	
LP-1472	Moms Mabley Breaks it Up	Moms Mabley	
LP-1473	Rinky Dink	Dave "Baby" Cortez	
LP-1474	Treasure Tunes from the Vault	Various Artists	
LP-1475	The World's Greatest Clown	Pigmeat Markham	
LP-1476	Dance Tunes from the Vault, Volume 2	Various Artists	
LP-1477	Young Men Si, Old Men No	Moms Mabley	
LP-1478	Groups of Goodies	Various Artists	
LP-1479	I Got Somethin' to Tell You	Moms Mabley	
LP-1480	Chuck Berry on Stage	Chuck Berry	
LP-1481	Slappy White at the Club Harlem	Slappy White	
LP-1482	The Funny Sides of Moms Mabley	Moms Mabley	
LP-1483	Folk Singer	Muddy Waters	
LP-1484	Open the Door Richard	Pigmeat Markham	
LP-1485	Chuck Berry's Greatest Hits	Chuck Berry	
LP-1486	Moms Wows	Moms Mabley	
LP-1487	The Best of Moms and Pigmeat Volume One	Moms Mabley / Pigmeat Markham	split album
LP/LPS-1488	St. Louis to Liverpool	Chuck Berry	
LP/LPS-1489	Full Bloom	Miss Jackie Ross	
LP-1490	The Blues Soul of Johnny "Guitar" Watson	Johnny "Guitar" Watson	also released as I Cried For You
LP-1491	Groups of Goodies Volume 2	Various Artists	
LP/LPS-1492	Shades of a Genius	Mitty Collier	
LP-1493	Mr. Funny Man	Pigmeat Markham	
LP-1494	Up Tight	Clay Tyson	
LP/LPS-1495	Chuck Berry in London	Chuck Berry	
LP/LPS-1496	I Do Love You	Billy Stewart	
LP-1497	The Men in My Life	Moms Mabley	
LP/LPS-1498	Fresh Berry's	Chuck Berry	
LP/LPS-1499	Unbelievable	Billy Stewart	also released as Summertime
LP-1500	This'll Kill Ya!	Pigmeat Markham	
LP-1501	The Real Folk Blues	Muddy Waters	
LP-1502	The Real Folk Blues	Howlin' Wolf	
LP-1503	The Real Folk Blues	Sonny Boy Williamson	
LP-1504	One More Time......	Moms Mabley / Pigmeat Markham	split album
LP/LPS-1505	If You Can't Be Good, Be Careful!	Pigmeat Markham	
LP/LPS-1506	The Comeback	Herb Lance	
LP/LPS-1507	Muddy, Brass & the Blues	Muddy Waters	
LP/LPS-1508	The Real Folk Blues	John Lee Hooker	
LP/LPS-1509	More Real Folk Blues	Sonny Boy Williamson	
LP/LPS-1510	The Real Folk Blues	Memphis Slim	
LP/LPS-1511	More Real Folk Blues	Muddy Waters	
LP/LPS-1512	More Real Folk Blues	Howlin' Wolf	
LP/LPS-1513	Billy Stewart Teaches Old Standards New Tricks	Billy Stewart	
LP/LPS-1514D	Chuck Berry's Golden Decade [2xLP]	Chuck Berry	
LP/LPS-1515	Mr. Vaudeville	Pigmeat Markham	
LP/LPS-1516	The Baroques	The Baroques	
LP-1517	Save Your Soul, Baby!	Pigmeat Markham	
LP/LPS-1518	Sax and the Single Girl	Charlie Chalmers	
LP/LPS-1519	Wayne Cochran!	Wayne Cochran	
LP/LPS-1520	Petal Pushers	Various Artists	The Bystanders - Royal Blue Summer Sunshine Day; Sounds Around - Red White And You; Pennsylvania Sixpence - Love Of The Common People; Ali Ben Dhown - Mustapha; Pinkerton's Colours - MUM And DAD; The Bystanders - Make Up Your Mind; The Traffic Jam - Almost But Not Quite There; Tony Crane - Anonymous Mr. Brown; Ali Ben Dhown - Turkish Delight; The Bystanders - Pattern People.
LP/LPS-1521	Backstage	Pigmeat Markham	
LP/LPS-1522	Heavy Heads	Various Artists	
LP/LPS-1523	Here Come the Judge	Pigmeat Markham	
LP/LPS-1524	The Last Request	Ben Branch and Operation Breadbasket	
LP/LPS-1525	Moms Mabley Breaks Up the Network	Moms Mabley	
LP/LPS-1526	Tune Me In	Pigmeat Markham	
LP/LPS-1527	I Left My Blues in San Francisco	Buddy Guy	
LP/LPS-1528	Heavy Heads Voyage 2	Various Artists	
LP/LPS-1529	The Hustlers	Pigmeat Markham	
LP/LPS-1530	Moms Mabley Sings	Moms Mabley	
LP/LPS-1531	Fathers and Sons	Muddy Waters	
LP/LPS-1532	Koko Taylor	Koko Taylor	
LP-1533	Blues from Big Bill's CopaCabana	Various Artists	
LP/LPS-1534	Pigmeat's Bag	Pigmeat Markham	
LP-1535	Hate to See You Go	Little Walter	Chess Vintage Series
LP-1536	Bummer Road	Sonny Boy Williamson	Chess Vintage Series
LP-1537	Whose Muddy Shoes	Elmore James / John Brim	Chess Vintage Series
LP-1538	Door to Door	Albert King / Otis Rush	Chess Vintage Series
LP-1539	Sail On	Muddy Waters	Chess Vintage Series reissue of Chess LP-1427
LP-1540	Evil	Howlin' Wolf	Chess Vintage Series reissue of Chess LP-1434
LP-1544	Pop Origins Volume One	Various Artists	
LP/LPS-1545	Moogie Woogie	The Zeet Band	
LP/LPS-1546	Souled Out	Various Artists	
LPS-1547	Billy Stewart Remembered	Billy Stewart	
LPS-1548	Just a Taste	Joann Garrett	
LPS-1549	On the Case	The SCLC Operation Breadbasket Orchestra and Choir	
LPS-1550	Back Home	Chuck Berry	
LPS-1551	Black Merda	Black Merda	
LP-1552	Rocky Roberts	Rocky Roberts	
LP-1553	They Call Me Muddy Waters	Muddy Waters	

=== Chess Vintage Series ===
The Chess Vintage LP series started with LP-407 and featured 9 albums released in 1970/71 with an additional three albums released in 1975.

Catalog No.	Album	Artist	Details
LP-407	Chicago Bound	Jimmy Rogers	with Little Walter and Muddy Waters recorded 1954–56
LP-408	Hung Down Head	Lowell Fulson	recorded 1954–61
LP-409	I Was Walking Through the Woods	Buddy Guy	
LP-410	Natural Man	J. B. Lenoir	
LP-411	Drop Down Mama	Various Artists	featuring Johnny Shines, Robert Nighthawk, Big Boy Spire, Honey Boy Edwards and Floyd Jones
CHV-412	Shoutin', Swingin' And Makin' Love	Various Artists	featuring Jimmy Rushing, Jimmy Witherspoon, Wynonie Harris and Al Hibbler
CHV-413	Rare Unissued Recordings, Vintage 1951-53	Various Artists	featuring Leo Parker, Sahib Shihab and Red Saunders
CHV-414	Chicago's Boss Tenors (1948-1956)	Various Artists	featuring Tom Archia, Gene Ammons, Claude McLin and Johnny Griffin
CHV-415	South Side Jazz	Various Artists	featuring Eddie South, Eddie Johnson, Prince Cooper, Red Saunders and Dave Young
CHV-416	Confessin' the Blues	Little Walter	
CHV-417	One Way Out	Sonny Boy Williamson	
CHV-418	Change My Way	Howlin' Wolf	

=== GRT consolidated Chess/Cadet album discography (1971–1975) ===
In 1971 Chess Records was purchased by General Recorded Tape, also known as GRT Corporation, which consolidated both the Chess and Cadet labels into a single labeling number sequence.

Catalog number	Title	Artist
Chess CH-50001	Another Dimension	Bo Diddley
Chess CH-50002	Message to the Young	Howlin' Wolf
Cadet CA-50004	Freedom Means	The Dells
Cadet CH-50005	Great Female Soul Vocalists	Various Artists
Cadet Concept CC-50006	Hey, Love	The New Rotary Connection
Cadet CA-50007	Occasional Rain	Terry Callier
Chess CH-50008	San Francisco Dues	Chuck Berry
Cadet CA-50009	Mystical Lady	Shirley Scott
Cadet Concept CC-50010	Oh What a Lovely War	Colonel Bagshot
Cadet CA-50011	Swahili Strut	Bobby Bryant Sextet
Chess CH-50012	Live at Mr. Kelly's	Muddy Waters
Chess CH-50013	Greatest Hits	Little Milton
Chess CH-50014	Power and Light	Power & Light
Chess CH-50015	Live and Cookin'	Howlin' Wolf
Chess CH-50016	Where it All Began	Bo Diddley
Cadet CA-50017	The Dells Sing Dionne Warwick's Greatest Hits	The Dells
Chess CH-50018	Basic Soul	Koko Taylor
Cadet CA-50019	What Color Is Love	Terry Callier
Cadet CA-50020	The Groover	Ramsey Lewis
Cadet CA-50021	Sweet as Funk Can Be	The Dells
Cadet 2CA-50022	The Best of the Soulful Strings	The Soulful Strings
Chess CH-50023	Can't Get No Grindin'	Muddy Waters
Cadet CA-50024	Check This Out	Jack McDuff
Cadet CA-50025	Lean on Me	Shirley Scott
Cadet CA-50026	Mr. Bojangles	Sonny Stitt
Chess 2CH-50027	This Is My Story	Sonny Boy Williamson
Chess CH-50029	The London Bo Diddley Sessions	Bo Diddley
Chess 2CH-50030	The Golden Age of Rhythm and Blues	Various Artists
Chess CH-50031	Love More Than Pride	Laura Lee
Chess CH-50032	Ghettos of the Mind	Bama the Village Poet
Chess 2CH-50033	Fathers and Sons	Muddy Waters
Cadet CA-50034	Teardrops in the Rain	Johnny Nash
Cadet 2CA-50035	Inspiration	Ahmad Jamal
Cadet CA-50036	Superstition	Shirley Scott
Cadet CA-50037	Give Your Baby a Standing Ovation	The Dells
Cadet 2CA-50038	It Was a Very Good Year	Ray Bryant
Cadet 2CA-50039	I Cover the Waterfront	Sonny Stitt
Chess CH-50040	Come and Get Me	Kim Tolliver
Cadet CA-50041	I Just Can't Help Myself	Terry Callier
Chess CH-50042	Etta James [a.k.a. Only a Fool]	Etta James
Chess CH-50043	Bio	Chuck Berry
Cadet CA-50044	Songs for Ageing Children	Dave Van Ronk
Chess CH-50045	The Back Door Wolf	Howlin' Wolf
Cadet CA-50046	The Dells	The Dells
Chess CH-50047	Big Bad Bo	Bo Diddley
Cadet CA-50048	While My Guitar Gently Weeps	Jimmy Ponder
Cadet CA-50049	Atlantis	Daniel Salinas
Cadet CA-50051	The Fourth Dimension	Jack McDuff
Cadet CA-50052	In the Cut	Ray Bryant
Chess CH-50053	You Can All Join In	The Violinaires
Cadet 2CA-50058	Solid Ivory	Ramsey Lewis
Cadet CH-50059	Cross My Heart	Billy Stewart
Cadet CA-50060	Satan	Sonny Stitt
Chess 2CH-60000	Laugh Time	Moms Mabley and Pigmeat Markham
Cadet CA-60001	Back to the Roots	Ramsey Lewis
Cadet 2CA-60002	Charlie Parker Memorial Concert	Various Artists
Cadet 2CA-60003	Rock Bottom	Various Artists
Chess 2CH-60004	Peaches	Etta James
Chess 2CH-60005	Got My Own Bag of Tricks	Bo Diddley
Chess 2CH-60006	McKinley Morganfield A.K.A. Muddy Waters	Muddy Waters
Cadet 2CA-60007	Ha' Mercy	Lou Donaldson
Chess CH-60008	The London Howlin' Wolf Sessions	Howlin' Wolf
Chess 2CH-60009	Moms and Pigmeat	Moms Mabley and Pigmeat Markham
Cadet 2CA-60010	Everything 'Bout Sax and Flute	James Moody
Chess 2CH-60011	Mad Man's Blues	John Lee Hooker
Chess 2CH-60012	Chicago Blues Anthology	Various Artists
Chess CH-60013	The London Muddy Waters Sessions	Muddy Waters
Chess 2CH-60014	Boss Blues Harmonica	Little Walter
Chess 2CH-60015	Blues Rock Cookbook: Montreux Festival	Various Artists
Chess 2CH-60016	Chester Burnette A.K.A. Howlin' Wolf	Howlin' Wolf
Cadet 2CA-60017	The Heatin' System	Jack McDuff
Cadet 2CA-60018	Inside	Ramsey Lewis
Cadet 2CA-60019	Cool Cookin'	Kenny Burrell
Chess CH-60020	The London Chuck Berry Sessions	Chuck Berry
Cadet CA-60021	12 X 6 The Hard Way	Various Artists
Cadet CA-60022	12 X 6 The Easy Way	Various Artists
Chess 2CH-60023	Chuck Berry's Golden Decade Volume 2	Chuck Berry
Cadet CA-60024	12 X 6 Volume 3	Various Artists
Cadet CA-60025	12 X 6 Volume 4	Various Artists
Chess 2CH-60026	London Revisited	Howlin' Wolf / Muddy Waters
Cadet CA-60027	The Dells vs. The Dramatics	The Dells / The Dramatics
Chess 2CH-60028	Chuck Berry's Golden Decade, Volume 3	Chuck Berry
Chess CH-60029	Come a Little Closer	Etta James
Cadet CA-60030	The Mighty, Mighty Dells	The Dells
Chess CH-60031	"Unk" in Funk	Muddy Waters
Chess CH-60032	Chuck Berry	Chuck Berry
Cadet CA-60033	Got to Get Your Own	Reuben Wilson
Chess CH-60034	American Gypsy	American Gypsy
Chess CH-60035	The Muddy Waters Woodstock Album	Muddy Waters
Chess CH-60036	The Dells Greatest Hits, Volume 2	The Dells
Chess CH-60037	Black Caucus Concert	Various Artists
Cadet 2CA-60038	Early Visions	Gene Ammons
Cadet CA-60039	Magnetic Feel	Jack McDuff
Cadet CA-60040	Never Can Say Goodbye	Sonny Stitt
Chess CH-60042	Music to Make Love By	Solomon Burke
Cadet CA-60044	We Got to Get Our Thing Together	The Dells
