= Phil Chess =

American record executive (1921–2016)

- Born: Fiszel Czyż; March 27, 1921; Motal, Poland (now Belarus)
- Died: October 18, 2016 (aged 95) Tucson, Arizona, U.S.
- Genres: Chicago blues, electric blues, blues, rock and roll, R&B, soul music
- Occupation: Record company executive
- Years active: 1950–1972
- Label: Chess Records

Philip Chess (born Fiszel Czyż; March 27, 1921 – October 18, 2016) was a Polish-born American record company executive, the founder of Chess Records alongside his brother Leonard.

== Early life ==
Chess was born to a Polish-Jewish family in the village of Motal, then in eastern Poland and now part of Belarus. He and his brother Lejzor, sister Malka and mother followed their father to Chicago in 1928. The family name was changed to Chess, with Lejzor becoming Leonard and Fiszel becoming Philip.

== Career ==
Chess served in the United States Army during World War II. In 1946, after leaving the Army, Phil joined Leonard in running a popular club, the Macomba Lounge. Two years later, Leonard became a partner in Aristocrat Records, a local company that recorded a wide range of music, and Phil joined in 1950. The company then changed its name to Chess Records, and began concentrating on R&B music, signing and recording artists such as Muddy Waters, Bo Diddley, "Sonny Boy Williamson" (Rice Miller), Robert Lockwood Jr., Etta James, Willie Dixon, Howlin Wolf and Chuck Berry. Phil Chess was actively involved in producing many of their blues and rock and roll recordings. The company expanded successfully through the 1950s and early 1960s, until it was sold to GRT in 1969.

Chess was also a co-founder with his brother of L & P Broadcasting, which operated radio station WSDM.

== Retirement ==
Phil Chess retired to Arizona in 1972. Phil and Leonard Chess were both inducted to the Blues Hall of Fame as non-performers in 1995. In February 2013, Phil Chess attended the ceremony to receive one of The Recording Academy's Trustees Awards for non-performers presented to him and his brother.

== Death ==
Chess died at his home in Tucson, Arizona, at the age of 95.
