= Leonard Chess =

Polish-American record executive (1917–1969)

- Born: Lejzor Szmuel Czyż; March 12, 1917; Motal, Poland
- Died: October 16, 1969 (aged 52); Chicago, Illinois, U.S.
- Burial place: Westlawn Cemetery
- Occupation: Record company executive
- Spouse: Revetta Sloan
- Children: 3, including Marshall Chess
- Family: Jamar Chess (grandson)
- Musical career
- Genres: Chicago blues; electric blues; blues; rock and roll; rhythm and blues; soul
- Years active: 1938–1969
- Labels: Chess, Checker, Argo, Cadet

Leonard Samuel Chess (born Lejzor Szmuel Czyż; March 12, 1917 – October 16, 1969) was a Polish-American record company executive and the founder of Chess Records alongside his brother Phil. He was influential in the development of the recording industry, and electric blues, Chicago blues, and rock and roll.

== Early life ==
Chess was born to Polish-Jewish parents in Motal, now in Belarus. He and his brother, Fiszel, sister, Malka, and mother arrived in New York in 1928 from Poland. They joined his father, Joseph, in Chicago. Joseph was engaged in the illegal liquor business at the height of Prohibition and was controlled in Chicago by Al Capone. The family name was changed from Czyż to Chess, with Lejzor becoming Leonard and Fiszel becoming Philip.

== Chess Records ==
Leonard and his brother Phil became involved in the black nightclub scene on the South Side of Chicago in 1938 running a series of jazz clubs, culminating in the Macomba Lounge. In 1947, Leonard became associated with Aristocrat Records, increasing his share in the company over time; eventually he and Phil would acquire complete control. The Chess brothers moved the company away from black pop and jazz and other genres into down home blues music with artists such as Muddy Waters. In 1950, the Chess brothers renamed the company Chess Records. "My Foolish Heart" (Gene Ammons), "Rollin' Stone" (Muddy Waters), and "That's All Right" (Jimmy Rogers) were among the first releases on the new label. Leonard Chess played bass drum on one of Muddy Waters' sessions in 1951, specifically on the tracks "She Moves Me" and "Still A Fool".

Chess contacted Sam Phillips (of Sun Records) to help find and record new artists from the South. Phillips supplied Chess with recordings by Howlin' Wolf, Rufus Thomas, and Doctor Ross among others. Of these, Howlin' Wolf in particular became popular, and Chess Records had to vie to sign him against other companies. In time, other important artists signed with Chess Records, including Bo Diddley and Sonny Boy Williamson, while Willie Dixon and Robert Lockwood Jr. took on a significant role behind the scenes. The Chess brothers formed the subsidiary labels Checker in 1952 and Argo (later renamed Cadet) in 1955. Chess Records' commercial success grew in the 1950s with artists such as Little Walter, The Moonglows, The Flamingos, and Chuck Berry, and in the '60s with Etta James, Fontella Bass, Koko Taylor, Little Milton, Laura Lee, and Tommy Tucker. As the 1960s progressed, Chess's recording enterprise branched out into other genres including gospel, traditional jazz, spoken word, comedy, and more. In the early 1960s, Chess became involved in the broadcasting business as part owner of WVON-AM radio and later acquired WSDM-FM, both in Chicago.

== Personal life and legacy ==
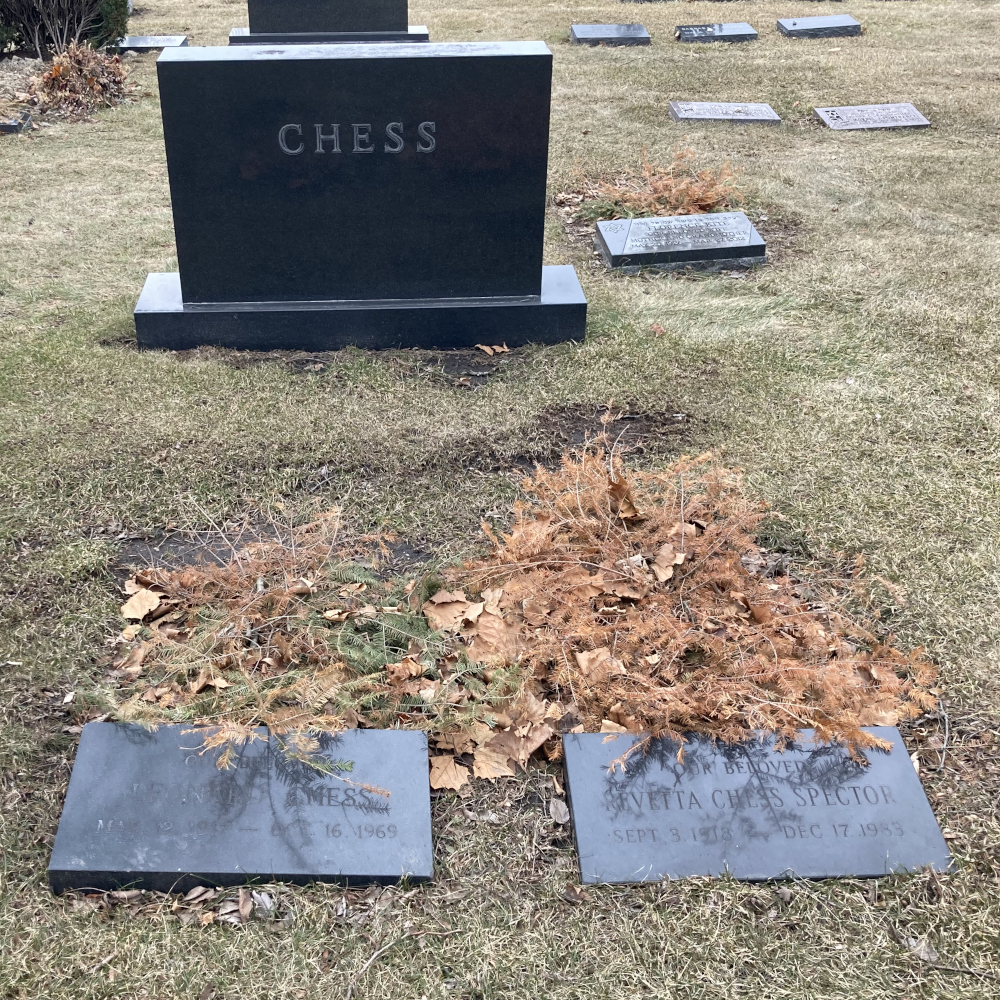
Chess's grave at Westlawn Cemetery

In 1941, Chess married Revetta Sloan and they had a son Marshall and two daughters, Elaine and Susie. On October 16, 1969, six months after selling his namesake label to General Recorded Tape, Leonard Chess died of a heart attack. He was buried at Westlawn Cemetery in Norridge, Illinois.

Music industry historian John Broven wrote that "Leonard Chess was the dynamo behind Chess Records, the label that, along with Atlantic and Sun, has come to epitomize the independent record business. ... Leonard Chess set new standards for the industry in artist development, deal making, networking, and marketing and promotion…" Leonard Chess was posthumously inducted into the Rock and Roll Hall of Fame in 1987 in the non-performer category.

== Film and TV adaptations ==
Leonard Chess was the focus of 2008 movies Cadillac Records (portrayed by Adrien Brody) and Who Do You Love? (portrayed by Alessandro Nivola). The movies are also fictional accounts of the ascent (and descent) of the label itself and the personnel who were involved with Chess Records.

He is portrayed by Rob Morrow on CMT's drama series titled Sun Records.

== See also ==
- Phil Chess– Leonard's brother, who co-founded and ran Chess Records with Leonard
- Marshall Chess – Leonard's son, became President of Chess Records after the GRT acquisition in 1969.
- Jamar Chess – Leonard's grandson, continues the family legacy, co-founder of music publishing companies Sunflower Entertainment and Revolution Songs.

== Bibliography ==
- Palmer, Robert (1982). Deep Blues. New York City: Penguin Books. ISBN 0-14006-223-8.
