= Return to Pepperland =

Studio album by Paul McCartney
- Released: Unreleased
- Recorded: 1981–1989
- Studios: Hog Hill Studio (UK), Audio International Studios (London), Power Station (New York City)
- Genre: Rock
- Length: 72:59
- Producer: Phil Ramone

Return to Pepperland is the name given to an unfinished recording project by English musician Paul McCartney with American record producer Phil Ramone. The songs recorded during these sessions have been the basis of bootleg albums usually titled Return to Pepperland. The album title is a reference to Pepperland, the fictional place that is the main focus in The Beatles' animated film Yellow Submarine.

== Background ==
While promoting the release of Press To Play in New York City in August 1986, McCartney met with Billy Joel's producer Phil Ramone, who had first worked with him the previous year on the title song of the movie soundtrack for Spies Like Us. Using Joel's backing band players, they recorded two songs, "Beautiful Night" and "Loveliest Thing". Further songs were recorded at McCartney's Hog Hill Studios which included: "Atlantic Ocean", "Big Day", "This One" and "Love Come Tumbling Down". During these sessions, the song "Return To Pepperland" was produced as a tribute to the 20th anniversary of The Beatles' 1967 album Sgt. Pepper's Lonely Hearts Club Band as well as the mash-up of Lennon–McCartney-written songs "Love Me Do" and "P.S. I Love You".

== Aftermath ==
In the end, only two songs from the sessions; "Once Upon a Long Ago" and "Back On My Feet" were released at the time. "Once Upon a Long Ago" and "Beautiful Night" were originally submitted to director Rob Reiner for the 1987 film The Princess Bride, but were rejected for being 'too sentimental'. In January 1988, McCartney took the remaining songs from the Ramone sessions and compiled a cassette, along with other songs he had been working on since the early 80s; this was the source of many of the bootlegs associated with the Phil Ramone sessions. McCartney continued to work with other producers, the results of which would eventually become the 1989 album Flowers In The Dirt. "Beautiful Night" would be re-recorded and released on the 1997 album Flaming Pie. Other songs from his work with Ramone would be released as B-sides and included on his Archive Collection releases in the following years.

== Songs associated with Return To Pepperland ==
All songs written by Paul McCartney, except where noted.

=== Songs with producer Phil Ramone (1986–1987) ===
1. "Beautiful Night" – 6:13
  - Recorded with Phil Ramone in 1987; this track was later re-recorded for release on Flaming Pie, 1997. This version also appeared as a B-side of some CD versions of the "Beautiful Night" single, embedded in the longer track "Oobu Joobu (Part 5)". In 2020, the 1987 version was released as a free stand alone download track on McCartney's website.
2. "Loveliest Thing" – 3:58
  - Released as a B-side to "Figure of Eight", 1989.
3. "Atlantic Ocean" – 6:47
  - Released as a B-side to "Young Boy", 1997, embedded in the longer track "Oobu Joobu (Part 2)".
4. "P.S. Love Me Do" (Lennon–McCartney) – 3:47
  - Released on the Japanese edition of Flowers in the Dirt, 1989. A live version appeared on the CD single version of "Birthday".
5. "This One" – 3:26
  - Demo version, finished for Flowers in the Dirt, 1989.
6. "Love Come Tumbling Down" – 4:22
  - Released as a B-side to "Beautiful Night", 1997.
7. "Once Upon A Long Ago" – 4:06
  - Released as a single in 1987 along with McCartney's best-of compilation All the Best!.
8. "Back On My Feet" – 4:25
  - Released as the b-side to "Once Upon A Long Ago"
9. "Return to Pepperland" – 4:53
  - Never officially released. Originally planned as a 12" single release.
10. "Big Day" – 5:36
  - Never officially released.
11. "Peacocks" – 3:47
  - Never officially released. Aired on Oobu Joobu episode 9.
12. "Love Mix" – 3:01
  - Released as a B-side to "Beautiful Night", 1997, embedded in the longer track "Oobu Joobu (Part 6)".

=== Other songs associated with Return To Pepperland ===
==== David Foster sessions at Hog Hill Studios (1984) ====
1. "Lindiana" – 5:48
  - Never officially released.
2. "I Love This House" – 3:44
  - Released as a B-side to "Young Boy", 1997, embedded in the longer track "Oobu Joobu (Part 1)".
3. "We Got Married" – 5:10
  - Early/demo version; re-recorded for release on Flowers in the Dirt, 1989.

==== Paul McCartney produced songs (1981–1989) ====
1. "Squid" – 6:25
  - Recorded 12 December 1986 at Hog Hill Studio. Released as a B-side to "The World Tonight", 1997, embedded in the longer track "Oobu Joobu (Part 3)".
2. "Christian Bop" – 2:21
  - Recorded 11 January 1981 at I.C.C Studios. The melody from "Christian Bop" has been used for the track entitled "Dance", from "Movement III – Crypt", of McCartney's Liverpool Oratorio, released in 1991. Released as a bonus track on the 2015 remastered edition of Pipes of Peace, 1983.
3. "Same Love" – 3:55
  - Recorded at Hog Hill Studios 1 June 1988. Released as a B-side to "Beautiful Night", 1997.
4. "Don't Break the Promise" (McCartney, Eric Stewart) – 3:38
  - Recorded at Hog Hill Studio 9 June 1988. Released as a B-side to "The World Tonight", 1997, embedded in the longer track "Oobu Joobu (Part 4)".

== Compilation cassette tracklisting ==
A studio compilation cassette was made, on 21 January 1988, of songs recorded between 1981 and 1988. Two of these tracks, "Rough Ride" and "Figure of Eight", were from the initial sessions with Trevor Horn and Steve Lipson that were the beginnings of Flowers In The Dirt. This cassette is one of the sources to the bootlegs of Return to Pepperland.

=== Side A ===
No.	Title	Length
1.	"Return To Pepperland"
2.	"Love Come Tumbling Down"
3.	"Christian Pop"
4.	"Atlantic Ocean"
5.	"Lindiana"
6.	"I Love This House"
7.	"We Got Married"
8.	"Rough Ride"
9.	"Figure Of Eight"

=== Side B ===
No.	Title	Length
1.	"Squid"
2.	"Big Day"
3.	"Beautiful Night"
4.	"Loveliest Thing"
5.	"Love Mix"
6.	"Peacocks"
7.	"This One"
