= In the World Tonight =

Paul McCartney: In the World Tonight
- Directed by: Geoff Wonfor
- Produced by: Geoff Wonfor
- Starring: Paul McCartney
- Cinematography: Eddie Crooks
- Edited by: Andy Matthews
- Production company: MPL
- Release date: 1997
- Running time: 55 minutes (broadcast version); 73 minutes (extended version)
- Country: United Kingdom
- Language: English

Paul McCartney: In the World Tonight is a 1997 documentary about the making of Paul McCartney's Flaming Pie album. The film takes its name from the album's second track, "The World Tonight".

== Summary ==
The film mostly consists of footage of McCartney working at his Hog Hill Mill recording studio during the production of Flaming Pie, including video footage of a tour round the studio originally recorded for McCartney's Oobu Joobu radio show in 1995. McCartney openly admits the influence of The Beatles Anthology project on the album.

His wife Linda McCartney, then suffering from breast cancer, is featured recording backing vocals for the album. McCartney also discusses the album in footage shot at the woods in Sussex near where he lives.

Guests shown recording for the album include Steve Miller and Jeff Lynne, as well as McCartney's former bandmate Ringo Starr, who is featured recording drums and backing vocals for the song "Beautiful Night". The camera crew later follow McCartney to Abbey Road Studios, where he works with George Martin on recording orchestration for the song, intended as the album's epic finale.

As well as the production of the album, the film also shows McCartney working on the animated film Tropic Island Hum, for which he conceived the story and screenplay, and recorded all the character's voices with his wife Linda. The film's title song was eventually released as a single in 2004.

McCartney also briefly discusses his work in classical music — 1991's Liverpool Oratorio and the then-upcoming Standing Stone, which was released in September 1997.

The extended version of the documentary includes clips from McCartney's Town Hall Meeting, a live broadcast on VH1 from Bishopsgate Memorial Hall in which McCartney answered fan questions from around the world, broadcast the day after the premiere of the documentary in the US.

== Broadcast and release history ==
The documentary was first broadcast in the US on 16 May 1997 on VH1, as part of their special themed McCartney week to tie-in with the album release. It was broadcast in the UK two days later on 18 May 1997 on ITV.

An extended 73 minute version was released on home video in October 1997, and later on DVD. It was also included on DVD as part of the deluxe edition of Flaming Pie, released in 2020.
