= Geoff Wonfor =

- Born: December 8, 1948; Newcastle upon Tyne, England
- Died: November 22, 2022 (aged 73); Newcastle upon Tyne
- Occupations: Film and TV director
- Notable work: The Beatles Anthology
- Spouse: Andrea Wonfor

Geoff Wonfor (8 December 1948 – 22 November 2022) was an English film and TV director best known for his work with the Beatles in the 1990s.

== Life ==
Wonfor was born in Newcastle upon Tyne and, at age 15, began working for Tyne Tees. He moved to the BBC in the 1970s and was part of a crew that followed boxer and activist Muhammad Ali for four days during his 1977 tour of the United Kingdom. While at the BBC, met his wife Andrea. The two of them later worked on the Newcastle-based 1980s music show, The Tube. At The Tube, Wonfor became a lifelong friend of presenter Jools Holland.

Wonfor entered the Beatles orbit when he directed a documentary about the 1986 film Shanghai Surprise, which had been co-produced by George Harrison. As a result of this interaction, Harrison recommended to Paul McCartney that Wonfor direct the planned Beatles Anthology documentary series. Wonfor spent nearly 5 years on the Anthology project, which first aired in late 1995. He won a Grammy Award in 1997 for the project. Wonfor also co-directed (with Kevin Godley) the music video for the Beatles' 1996 single, "Real Love". Wonfor continued to work with McCartney after the Anthology, directing music videos to two singles from McCartney's 1997 album, Flaming Pie—"Young Boy" and "The World Tonight"—as well as Live at the Cavern Club, a video of McCartney's December 1999 performance at the Cavern Club in Liverpool.

Wonfor also directed a documentary on Band Aid 20 and the music video for the Stone Roses' 1989 single, "Fools Gold".

== Death ==
Wonfor died on 22 November 2022 in Newcastle.
