= The Chess Box =

Box set by Chuck Berry
- Released: 1988
- Recorded: May 21, 1955 – 1973
- Genre: Rock and roll
- Length: 198:17
- Label: Chess
- Producers: Leonard Chess, Phil Chess, Chuck Berry, Esmond Edwards
- Compiler: Andy McKaie

Chuck Berry chronology
| Hail! Hail! Rock 'n' Roll (1987) | The Chess Box (1988) | On the Blues Side (1994) |

Professional ratings
Review scores
| Source | Rating |
|---|---|
| AllMusic | 5/5 stars |
| Christgau's Record Guide | A |
| MSN Music (Expert Witness) | A |
| Encyclopedia of Popular Music | 5/5 stars |
| Rolling Stone | 5/5 stars |

The Chess Box is a compact disc box set compilation by Chuck Berry. It is one in a series of box sets issued by MCA/Chess in the late 1980s (the other sets were by Bo Diddley, Howlin' Wolf, Muddy Waters, Willie Dixon, and Etta James). The Chuck Berry set is the most prominent of these, having won a Grammy Award for Best Historical Album in 1989. Berry's Chess Box was reissued on vinyl in 1990.

This collection was also issued on audio cassette.

== Songs ==
The songs "I'm Just a Lucky So and So" and "Time Was" were previously unreleased. "Cryin' Steel" was first released as "Surfin' Steel" on Chuck Berry on Stage. "Ramona Say Yes" did not have saxophones.

Another song of interest is "Chuck's Beat", from the album Two Great Guitars, by Berry and Bo Diddley.

== Track listing ==
All songs written by Chuck Berry except as noted

=== Disc 1 ===
1. "Maybellene" (2:18)
2. "Wee Wee Hours" (2:02)
3. "Thirty Days" (2:21)
4. "You Can't Catch Me" (2:42)
5. "No Money Down" (2:56)
6. "Downbound Train" (2:49)
7. "Brown Eyed Handsome Man" (2:15)
8. "Drifting Heart" (2:47)
9. "Roll Over Beethoven" (2:22)
10. "Too Much Monkey Business" (2:53)
11. "Havana Moon" (3:06)
12. "School Days" (2:40)
13. "Rock and Roll Music" (2:30)
14. "Oh Baby Doll" (2:36)
15. "I've Changed" (3:04)
16. "Reelin' and Rockin'" (3:15)
17. "Rockin' at the Philharmonic" (3:21)
18. "Sweet Little Sixteen" (3:10)
19. "Johnny B. Goode" (2:37)
20. "Time Was" (Gabriel Luna, Miguel Prado, Bob Russell) (1:56)
21. "Around and Around" (2:38)
22. "Beautiful Delilah" (2:13)
23. "House of Blue Lights" (Don Raye, Freddie Slack) (2:24)
24. "Carol" (2:46)

=== Disc 2 ===
1. "Memphis, Tennessee" (2:10)
2. "Anthony Boy" (1:52)
3. "Jo Jo Gunne" (2:45)
4. "Sweet Little Rock N' Roller" (2:20)
5. "Merry Christmas Baby" (Lou Baxter, Johnny Moore) (3:11)
6. "Run Rudolph Run" (Marvin Brodie, Johnny Marks) (2:43)
7. "Little Queenie" (2:40)
8. "Almost Grown" (2:18)
9. "Back in the U.S.A." (2:27)
10. "Betty Jean" (2:29)
11. "Childhood Sweetheart" (2:42)
12. "Let It Rock" (1:45)
13. "Too Pooped to Pop" (Billie Davis) (2:33)
14. "Bye Bye Johnny" (2:03)
15. "Jaguar and Thunderbird" (1:50)
16. "Down the Road a Piece" (Raye) (2:13)
17. "Confessin' the Blues" (Walter Brown, Jay McShann) (2:07)
18. "Thirteen Question Method" (2:12)
19. "Crying Steel" (2:32)
20. "I'm Just a Lucky So-and-So" (Mack David, Duke Ellington) (2:50)
21. "I'm Talking About You" (1:48)
22. "Come On" (1:48)
23. "Nadine (Is It You?)" (Berry, Alan Freed) (2:35)
24. "Crazy Arms" (Ralph Mooney, Chuck Seals) (2:12)
25. "You Never Can Tell" (2:40)
26. "The Things I Used To Do" (Guitar Slim) (2:40)
27. "Promised Land" (2:20)

=== Disc 3 ===
1. "No Particular Place to Go" (2:41)
2. "Liverpool Drive" (2:53)
3. "You Two" (2:08)
4. "Chuck's Beat" (Berry, Bo Diddley) (10:35)
5. "Little Marie" (2:34)
6. "Dear Dad" (1:48)
7. "Sad Day Long Night" (2:42)
8. "It's My Own Business" (2:10)
9. "It Wasn't Me" (2:32)
10. "Ramona Say Yes" (2:40)
11. "Viva Viva Rock N' Roll" (2:00)
12. "Tulane" (2:36)
13. "Have Mercy Judge" (2:38)
14. "My Dream" (5:56)
15. "Reelin' and Rockin'", live recording (7:02)
16. "My Ding-a-Ling", live single-edit (4:16)
17. "Johnny B. Goode", live recording (3:13)
18. "A Deuce" (2:32)
19. "Woodpecker" (3:33)
20. "Bio" (4:22)

== Personnel ==
Performers

- Chuck Berry – lead vocals, guitar, piano
- Owen McIntyre – guitar
- Matt "Guitar" Murphy – guitar
- Billy Peek – guitar
- Jimmy Rogers – guitar
- Bo Diddley – guitar
- Stan Bronstein – saxophone
- L.C. Davis – tenor saxophone
- Adam Ippolito – piano
- Johnnie Johnson – piano
- Dave Kafinetti – piano
- Lafayette Leake – piano
- Otis Spann – piano
- Paul Williams – piano
- Jerome Green – maracas
- Chuck Bernard – bass guitar
- Willie Dixon – bass
- Jack "Zocko" Groendal – bass guitar
- Nic Potter – bass guitar
- George "Harmonica" Smith – bass
- Gary VanScyoc – bass guitar
- Fred Below – drums
- Rick Frank – drums
- Eddie Hardy – drums
- Robbie McIntosh – drums
- Bill Metros – drums
- Odie Payne – drums
- Jasper Thomas – drums
- Martha Berry – backing vocals

Production

- Leonard Chess – producer
- Phil Chess – producer
- Chuck Berry – producer
- Esmond Edwards – producer
- Billy Altman – liner notes
- Andy McKaie – reissue production, compilation production
- Greg Fulginiti – mastering
- Doug Schwartz – digital transfer

== Charts ==
Chart performance for The Chess Box
| Chart (2023–2026) | Peak position |
|---|---|
| Canadian Albums (Billboard) | 48 |
| US Top Blues Albums (Billboard) | 1 |
