= Run Devil Run =

Run Devil Run may refer to:

== Music ==
=== Albums ===
- Run Devil Run (album), a 1999 album by Paul McCartney
- Oh! (Girls' Generation album), a 2010 album re-released as Run Devil Run

=== Songs ===
- "Run Devil Run" (Girls' Generation song), 2010
- "Run Devil Run" (Paul McCartney song), 1999
- "Run Devil Run", a 2006 song by Jenny Lewis and the Watson Twins from Rabbit Fur Coat
- "Run Devil Run", a 2016 song by Crowder

== Other uses ==
- Run Devil Run oil, Mexican folk remedy
