= Hail! Hail! Rock 'n' Roll =

- Film poster
- Directed by: Taylor Hackford
- Produced by: Keith Richards; Chuck Berry; Stephanie Bennett
- Starring: Chuck Berry; Keith Richards; Johnnie Johnson; Roy Orbison; Joey Spampinato; Chuck Leavell; Bobby Keys; Steve Jordan; Eric Clapton; Robert Cray; Linda Ronstadt; Etta James; Julian Lennon; Joe Walsh; Ingrid Berry
- Music by: Chuck Berry
- Distributed by: Universal Pictures
- Release date: October 9, 1987
- Running time: 120 minutes
- Country: United States
- Language: English
- Box office: $719,323

Hail! Hail! Rock 'n' Roll is a 1987 American documentary film directed by Taylor Hackford that chronicles two 1986 concerts celebrating rock and roll musician Chuck Berry's 60th birthday. A soundtrack album was released in October 1987 on the MCA label. The name comes from a line in Berry's song "School Days".

The two concerts were held on October 16, 1986, at the Fox Theatre in St. Louis; among the artists performing with Berry were Linda Ronstadt, Keith Richards, Eric Clapton, Robert Cray, Etta James, Johnnie Johnson, Steve Jordan, Bobby Keys, Julian Lennon, and Joey Spampinato of NRBQ. Along with concert footage, the film also features scenes from the rehearsals for the shows, interviews with Berry and members of his family, and "talking-head"-type appearances from a number of musicians, including Bo Diddley, The Everly Brothers, John Lennon (archival footage), Jerry Lee Lewis, Roy Orbison, Little Richard and Bruce Springsteen.

== Track listing ==
Taylor Hackford's film is a wickedly funny and moving rock-doc classic, exposing Berry the money-grubbing control freak without devaluing his genius in the process.

—Robert Christgau
1. "Come On" (Chuck Berry) rehearsal at Berry's home, Wentzville 8.-14.10.86
2. "Carol" (Chuck Berry) rehearsal at Berry's home, Wentzville 8.-14.10.86
3. "It Don't Take But a Few Minutes" (Chuck Berry) -rehearsal at Berry's home, Wentzville 8.-14.10.86
4. "I'm Through With Love" (Gus Kahn/Matt Malneck/Fud Livingston) rehearsal at Berry's home, Wentzville 8.-14.10.86
5. "Roll Over Beethoven" (Chuck Berry) (ft. Robert Cray)
6. "Almost Grown" (Chuck Berry)
7. "Back in the U.S.A." (Chuck Berry) (ft. Cray, Linda Ronstadt)
8. "Sweet Little Sixteen" (Chuck Berry)
9. "No Money Down" (Chuck Berry)
10. "Nadine" (Chuck Berry)
11. "Johnny B. Goode" (Chuck Berry) (ft. Julian Lennon)
12. "Memphis, Tennessee" (Chuck Berry)
13. "Little Queenie" (Chuck Berry)
14. "Brown Eyed Handsome Man" (Chuck Berry) (ft. Cray)
15. "Too Much Monkey Business" (Chuck Berry)
16. "No Particular Place to Go" (Chuck Berry)
17. "Wee Wee Hours" (Chuck Berry) (ft. Eric Clapton)
18. "Rock and Roll Music" (Chuck Berry) (ft. Clapton, Cray, Etta James, Keith Richards)
19. "School Days" (Chuck Berry) (ft. Berry, Clapton, Cray, Joe Walsh)

=== Bonus rehearsals on the DVD ===
1. "Guitar Jam" (Chuck Berry/Keith Richards/Eric Clapton)
2. "Mean Old World" (Walter Jacobs)
3. "It Don't Take But a Few Minutes" (Chuck Berry)
4. "Hoochie Coochie Gal" (Willie Dixon/Etta James)
5. "A Cottage for Sale" (Willard Robison/Larry Conley)

== The band ==
- Chuck Berry – vocals, electric guitar
- Keith Richards – electric guitar, backing vocals
- Johnnie Johnson – piano
- Chuck Leavell – organ
- Joey Spampinato – bass guitar, backing vocals
- Steve Jordan – drums, backing vocals
- Bobby Keys – tenor saxophone
- Ingrid Berry – backing vocals
- Eric Clapton, Robert Cray – electric guitar, vocals
- Etta James, Julian Lennon, Linda Ronstadt – vocals

As told in the interview section of the Bonus DVD, Berry shot his voice at a cold open air concert the day before the filming of the movie. All of his lead vocals are therefore overdubbed in a studio.
