= Live at the Cavern Club =

Video by Paul McCartney
- Released: 2000
- Recorded: 14 December 1999
- Venue: The Cavern Club, Liverpool
- Genre: Rock
- Length: 45 min.
- Label: MPL
- Director: Geoff Wonfor
- Producer: Geoff Wonfor; Andy Matthews

Paul McCartney chronology
Paul Is Live – The New World Tour (1994)	Live at the Cavern Club (2000)	Wingspan (2001)

Live at the Cavern Club is a concert film starring Paul McCartney. It was filmed on 14 December 1999, during his concert at The Cavern Club, in Liverpool, England, and it was directed by Geoff Wonfor. On stage with McCartney were David Gilmour, Mick Green, Ian Paice, Pete Wingfield, and Chris Hall. The DVD earned Gold status in Australia.

== Track listing ==
1. "Honey Hush" (Joe Turner)
2. "Blue Jean Bop" (Gene Vincent, Morris Levy)
3. "Brown Eyed Handsome Man" (Chuck Berry)
4. "Fabulous" (Harry Land, Jon Sheldon)
5. "What It Is" (McCartney)
6. "Lonesome Town" (Baker Knight)
7. "Twenty Flight Rock" (Ned Fairchild)
8. "No Other Baby" (Dickie Bishop, Bob Watson)
9. "Try Not to Cry" (McCartney)
10. "Shake a Hand" (Joe Morris)
11. "All Shook Up" (Otis Blackwell, Elvis Presley)
12. "I Saw Her Standing There" (Lennon–McCartney)
13. "Party" (Jessie Mae Robinson)

== Personnel ==
- Paul McCartney – bass, lead vocals
- David Gilmour – guitar, vocals
- Mick Green – guitar, vocals
- Ian Paice – drums
- Pete Wingfield – keyboards
- Chris Hall – accordion

== Home media ==
The film was released on DVD and VHS on 19 June 2001 by Image Entertainment.

== Certifications ==
Region	Certification	Certified units/sales
Australia (ARIA)	Gold	7,500^{^}
^{^} Shipments figures based on certification alone.
