= Calico Skies =

Song by Paul McCartney

from the album Flaming Pie
- Released: 5 May 1997
- Recorded: 3 September 1992
- Studio: Hog Hill Mill (Icklesham, UK)
- Genre: Rock, folk rock
- Length: 2:29
- Label: Parlophone (UK); Capitol (US)
- Songwriter: Paul McCartney
- Producers: Paul McCartney, George Martin

Flaming Pie track listing
- 14 tracks: 1. "The Song We Were Singing"; 2. "The World Tonight"; 3. "If You Wanna"; 4. "Somedays"; 5. "Young Boy"; 6. "Calico Skies"; 7. "Flaming Pie"; 8. "Heaven on a Sunday"; 9. "Used to Be Bad"; 10. "Souvenir"; 11. "Little Willow"; 12. "Really Love You"; 13. "Beautiful Night"; 14. "Great Day"

"Calico Skies" is the sixth song on English musician Paul McCartney's 1997 album, Flaming Pie.

== Overview ==
McCartney had been staying on Long Island when the category-three storm Hurricane Bob that made landfall had hit in August 1991. This made McCartney sit with an acoustic guitar and write what he describes as "a gentle love song that becomes a 1960s protest song". The song was co-produced by George Martin and McCartney, being started, finished, and mixed within a single session on 3 September 1992 in Sussex, England. It is the earliest recording on Flaming Pie.

McCartney says of the song: "Bob” the hurricane, knocked out all the power; it was all candle-light, cooking on a woodfire. Very primitive, but we like that enforced simplicity. I couldn't play records, so I made up little acoustic pieces. This was one of them—it's a primitive little powercut memory."

"Calico Skies" was arranged for string quartet; this version was included on McCartney's 1999 album Working Classical. The song was also re-recorded for inclusion on the album Hope which was released in 2003 to aid victims of the Iraq War.

In 2020, McCartney released an acoustic recording of the song, subtitled "Campfire Version”.

== Personnel ==
- Paul McCartney – vocals, acoustic guitar, producer
- Bob Kraushaar – engineer
- George Martin – producer

== Cover versions ==
Mike Nugent and Nancy Sirloni covered the song on the album "Let Us In" Nashville: A Tribute to Linda McCartney, consisting of country-themed covers of McCartney songs by various artists, released on 21 November 2011, a benefit album for The Women and Cancer Fund.
