= Hail! Hail! Rock 'n' Roll (album) =

1987 album by Chuck Berry

Soundtrack album by Chuck Berry
- Released: October 1987
- Recorded: October 1986
- Genre: Rock and roll
- Length: 41:51
- Label: MCA
- Producer: Keith Richards

Chuck Berry chronology
Rock 'N' Roll Rarities (1986)	Hail! Hail! Rock 'n' Roll (1987)	The Chess Box (Box Set) (1988)

Professional ratings
Review scores
Source	Rating
AllMusic	3/5 stars
Christgau's Record Guide	B+

Hail! Hail! Rock 'n' Roll is an album by Chuck Berry and soundtrack to the eponymous film, which was released in 1987 under record label, MCA. The album was recorded live at the Fox Theatre, St Louis, Missouri, and Berry Park, Wentzville, Missouri, in October 1986. The event was held to celebrate Berry's 60th birthday and it included several special guests. The album does not include the Berry song "School Days", which includes the line the album's title is derived from (although the song does appear in the film).

The release of this album on MCA was something of a homecoming for Berry, who from 1954 to 1966 and again from 1970 to 1975 recorded for Chess Records which, by 1986, was now part of MCA.

== Track listing ==
1. "Maybellene" – 2:37
2. "Around and Around" – 2:24
3. "Sweet Little Sixteen" – 2:42
4. "Brown Eyed Handsome Man" – 2:28
5. "Memphis, Tennessee" – 3:08
6. "Too Much Monkey Business" – 2:57
7. "Back in the U.S.A." – 3:29
8. "Wee Wee Hours" – 5:24
9. "Johnny B. Goode" – 3:13
10. "Little Queenie" – 3:41
11. "Rock and Roll Music" – 3:45
12. "Roll Over Beethoven" – 3:15
13. "I'm Through With Love" – 2:50

== Personnel ==
- Chuck Berry – Guitar, Vocals
- Johnnie Johnson – Piano
- Keith Richards – Guitar
- Chuck Leavell – Organ
- Bobby Keys – Saxophone
- Joey Spampinato – Bass
- Steve Jordan – drums
- Ingrid Berry – Vocals
- Eric Clapton – Guitar, Vocals (on track 8)
- Robert Cray – Guitar, Vocals (on track 4)
- Etta James – Vocals (on track 11)
- Julian Lennon – Vocals (on track 9)
- Linda Ronstadt – Vocals (on track 7)
