= Really Love You =

1997 song by Paul McCartney and Ringo Starr

Song by Paul McCartney

from the album Flaming Pie
- Published: MPL Communications/Startling Music
- Released: 5 May 1997
- Genre: Rock
- Length: 5:18
- Label: Parlophone
- Songwriters: Paul McCartney, Richard Starkey
- Producers: Paul McCartney; Jeff Lynne

Flaming Pie track listing
- 14 tracks: 1. "The Song We Were Singing"; 2. "The World Tonight"; 3. "If You Wanna"; 4. "Somedays"; 5. "Young Boy"; 6. "Calico Skies"; 7. "Flaming Pie"; 8. "Heaven on a Sunday"; 9. "Used to Be Bad"; 10. "Souvenir"; 11. "Little Willow"; 12. "Really Love You"; 13. "Beautiful Night"; 14. "Great Day"

"Really Love You"

Single by Twin Freaks

from the album Twin Freaks
- B-side: "Lalula"
- Released: 6 June 2005
- Genre: Rock
- Length: 5:42
- Label: Parlophone
- Songwriters: Paul McCartney, Richard Starkey
- Producer: Freelance Hellraiser

Paul McCartney singles chronology
"Jenny Wren" (2005)	"Really Love You" (2005)	"This Never Happened Before" (2006)

"Really Love You" is the first song written by Paul McCartney and Ringo Starr. It was originally released on McCartney's 1997 album Flaming Pie. In 2005, a new version was released as a limited edition 12" vinyl on the album Twin Freaks.

The song was written during a jam session the day after McCartney and Starr recorded "Beautiful Night", another song on Flaming Pie that features Starr on drums.

== Personnel ==
Personnel per Flaming Pie booklet

- Paul McCartney – lead vocal, backing vocal, bass guitar, electric guitar, Wurlitzer piano
- Jeff Lynne – backing vocal, electric guitar
- Ringo Starr – drums

== See also ==
- "Angel in Disguise"
