= The Two Popes (soundtrack) =

The Two Popes (Music from the Netflix Film)

Soundtrack album by Bryce Dessner
- Released: December 6, 2019
- Studios: Abbey Road (London, UK); Studio K (Paris, France); Funkhaus Berlin (Berlin, Germany); VSOP Studios (Chicago, Illinois)
- Genre: Film score
- Length: 53:22
- Label: Milan
- Producer: Bryce Dessner

Bryce Dessner chronology
The Kitchen (2019)	The Two Popes (2019)	Irresistible (2020)

The Two Popes (Music from the Netflix Film) is the soundtrack album to the 2019 film The Two Popes directed by Fernando Meirelles, starring Anthony Hopkins as Pope Benedict XVI and Jonathan Pryce as Cardinal Jorge Mario Bergoglio. The National's Bryce Dessner composed the film score which was released through Milan Records on December 6, 2019.

== Development ==
Bryce Dessner of the National composed the score for The Two Popes. He accepted the film, having liked Meirelles' works for City of God (2002) and The Constant Gardener (2005), the former being "one of the best movies [he had] seen", and considered him as "an extremely music-minded director". When Meirelles and one of the producers, who were shooting in Rome, had temped the filmed footage using Dessner's music, they considered him to work on the film. Dessner recalled that "Fernando [Meirelles] liked the diversity of my background, in particular, some of my classical music and music I write for voices", hence he met Meirelles on set and discussed about the film's musical palette. Dessner noted that the screenplay which was adapted from Anthony McCarten's play The Pope had "this incredible intimacy about it, almost like a Samuel Beckett kind of play, which is largely these conversations about theology between two old men, two incredible actors" and staging it cinematically was a challenge. Music was one of the ways to make it cinematic and bring energy for certain sequences.

As Meirelles denied Dessner to write straightforward and conventional Hollywood music, Dessner worked hard on finding sounds which suited the film, where the primary challenge was to find the intimate sound which had a character and matching the onscreen action. Dessner noted that the film had much of humor with a sense of levity, and the music accents that. He noted the use of saxophone as an unexpected sound in two key religious moments for Bergoglio. The sounds associated with Benedict are huge orchestral moments associating with him, while Bergoglio's sounds were much more intimate and folkloric with the primary use of the South American nylon string guitar. Dessner wrote a guitar melody for one of the intimate moments in the film, where it "is one of several important themes in the score that relate to major development in Bergoglio’s story". Dessner noted that the source music, also matched with the distinctive sonic identities of the two characters.

The score was recorded at the Abbey Road Studios in London, which was decided from the start of recording the film score, referencing his version of "Blackbird" (1968) by The Beatles being recorded there as with Pope Benedict XVI's album. As Dessner considered record production was based in London, this venue and AIR Studios were considered the two places to record the score. The London Contemporary Orchestra performed the film score. Dessner incorporated Argentinean guitar sounds, representing Pope Francis' native country of Argentina. For that election scene, he arranged the musical melody with intimate guitar that expands into a massive orchestral piece. Dessner noted that the use of nylon string guitar, was really Spanish in a way, although the origins of the instrument is based in South America. However, he admitted recording South American traditional pieces, which includes "Siete de Abril", a Colombian traditional melody, which he took time to learn and used bandoneons for recording. While the guitar is played for most part, the bandoneon, which was used in association with tango or piazzola, had been used in an orchestral way.

== Release ==
Milan Records released the soundtrack on December 6, 2019, a week after the film's limited release in the United States and two weeks prior to the Netflix premiere.

== Reception ==
Ella Kemp of NME considered the film's score as "whimsical". Robert Daniels of Consequence wrote "Bryce Dessner’s score swings between lounge act and jazz club, while adding a further sense of ease to any scene between the two actors."

== Track listing ==
No.	Title	Artist(s)	Length
1.	"Walls"		4:42
2.	"Cuando Tenga la Tierra"	Mercedes Sosa	4:10
3.	"Dialogues"		0:57
4.	"Vote Counting"		1:10
5.	"Ratzinger Election"		2:40
6.	"Garden Dialogues"		1:31
7.	"Was It Something I Said"		0:57
8.	"Shifting Gardens"		0:56
9.	"Cathedral"		0:44
10.	"Bergolio's Awakening"		2:15
11.	"Siete de Abril"		1:30
12.	"Dirty War"		3:58
13.	"Taken Away and Tortured"		2:53
14.	"They Took Esther"		2:06
15.	"Another Bergolio"		2:24
16.	"Walls 2"		1:20
17.	"Pope Francis"		2:37
18.	"Sombras de Buenos Aires"		3:36
19.	"Minguito"	Dino Saluzzi	6:56
20.	"Sastanàqqàm"	Tinariwen	3:23
21.	"Bésame Mucho"	Ray Conniff and His Orchestra	2:37
Total length:			53:22

== Personnel ==
Credits adapted from liner notes:

- Music composer and producer – Bryce Dessner
- Engineer – Bella Blasko, Bryce Dessner, Jon Low
- Assistant engineer – John Barrett
- Recording and mixing – Kirsty Whalley, Peter Cobbin
- Mastering – Rob Kleiner
- Music editor – Lewis Morison
- Additional music editor – Arabella Winter, Timeri Duplat
- Music supervisor – Becky Bentham
- Copyist – Stephen Feigenbaum

Orchestra

- Performer – London Contemporary Orchestra
- Orchestrator – Bryce Dessner
- Conductor and contractor – Hugh Brunt

Instruments

- Bandoneon – Julien Labro
- Bass – Logan Coale
- Cello – Nicholas Photinos
- Clarinet – Zachary Good
- Guitar – Bryce Dessner
- Organ – James McVinnie, Bryce Dessner
- Percussion – Paul Clarvis, James McAllister, Jason Treuting, Bryce Dessner
- Piano – Lisa Kaplan, Bryce Dessner
- Saxophone – Michael Lewis
- Viola – Beth Meyer

== Accolades ==
Award	Date of ceremony	Category	Recipients	Result	Ref.
World Soundtrack Awards	October 24, 2020	Discovery of the Year	Bryce Dessner	Won	

== Release history ==
Region	Date	Format(s)	Label(s)	Ref.
Various	February 28, 2025	Digital download; streaming	Milan Records	
Various	May 30, 2025	LP	Music on Vinyl	
