= Devil in Disguise (disambiguation) =

Devil in Disguise can refer to:

- "(You're the) Devil in Disguise", a 1963 single by Elvis Presley
- "Christine's Tune", a song from the 1969 album The Gilded Palace of Sin by the Flying Burrito Brothers
  - A cover version (by that name) of "Christine's Tune", from the 1982 live album Last Date by Emmylou Harris
- A song from the 1982 album Grasshopper by J. J. Cale
- A 2009 novel by Julian Clary
- "Devil in Disguise", a song by Rancid from their 2023 album Tomorrow Never Comes
- "Devil in Disguise", a song by Judas Priest from their 2024 album Invincible Shield
- Devil in Disguise: John Wayne Gacy, a 2025 miniseries about the serial killer John Wayne Gacy

== See also ==
- Angel in Disguise (disambiguation)
