= After School Session =

Studio album by Chuck Berry
- Released: May 1957
- Recorded: May 21, 1955 – January 21, 1957, Chicago, Illinois
- Studio: Universal Recording Corp. (Chicago)
- Genre: Rock and roll
- Length: 33:16
- Label: Chess
- Producers: Leonard Chess, Phil Chess

Chuck Berry chronology
After School Session (1957)	One Dozen Berrys (1958)

Singles from After School Session
- 1. "No Money Down" Released: December 1955; 2. "Too Much Monkey Business" Released: September 1956; 3. "School Days" Released: March 1957

Professional ratings
Review scores
Source	Rating
AllMusic	4.5/5 stars

After School Session is the debut studio album by rock and roll artist Chuck Berry, released in May 1957 by Chess Records. With the exception of two tracks, "Roly Poly" and "Berry Pickin'", all selections had been previously released on 45 rpm singles. It is the second long-playing album released by the Chess label.

== Recording sessions ==
The songs on After School Session were taken from Berry's first five sessions for Leonard and Phil Chess, which took place at Universal Recording Corporation in Chicago.

"Wee Wee Hours" was the first to be recorded, on May 21, 1955. "Together (We'll Always Be)" was recorded in September 1955.

At the next session, on December 20, 1955, Berry recorded "Roly Poly" (also known as "Rolli Polli"), "No Money Down", "Berry Pickin'", and "Down Bound Train".

The third session was on April 16, 1956, when he recorded "Too Much Monkey Business", "Brown Eyed Handsome Man", and "Drifting Heart". "Havana Moon" was recorded on October 29, 1956.

The last session took place on January 21, 1957, when he recorded "School Days" and "Deep Feeling".

== Release ==
The album was released in May 1957 on Chess Records, catalogue LP 1426. It is the second long-playing album released by the label.

== Singles ==
The first song on the original version of After School Session to be released was "Wee Wee Hours", the B-side of "Maybellene", issued in July 1955. It peaked at number 10 on Billboard's R&B Singles chart. The next song to be released was "Together We Will Always Be", the B-side of "Thirty Days", in September 1955. The next two songs released were "No Money Down" backed with "Down Bound Train", in December 1955, the former peaking at number 8 on the R&B Singles chart. In May 1956, "Drifting Heart" was released as the B-side of "Roll Over Beethoven". Berry's next single, "Too Much Monkey Business" backed with "Brown Eyed Handsome Man", was released in September 1956; these songs reached number 4 and number 5 on the R&B Singles chart, respectively. "Havana Moon", the B-side of "You Can't Catch Me", was released in November 1956. The last single from the album to be released was "School Day (Ring Ring Goes the Bell)" backed with "Deep Feeling", in March 1957, with the former reaching number 1 on the R&B Singles chart and number 3 on the Hot 100.

== Track listing ==
All tracks are written by Chuck Berry.

Side One
No.	Title	Length
1.	"School Days"	2:43
2.	"Deep Feeling"	2:21
3.	"Too Much Monkey Business"	2:56
4.	"Wee Wee Hours"	3:05
5.	"Roly Poly (aka Rolli Polli)"	2:51
6.	"No Money Down"	2:59

Side Two
No.	Title	Length
7.	"Brown Eyed Handsome Man"	2:19
8.	"Berry Pickin'"	2:33
9.	"Together (We Will Always Be)"	2:39
10.	"Havana Moon"	3:09
11.	"Downbound Train"	2:51
12.	"Drifting Heart"	2:50
Total length:		33:16

Bonus tracks (2004 release)
No.	Title	Length
1.	"You Can't Catch Me"	2:44
2.	"Thirty Days (To Come Back Home)"	2:25
3.	"Maybellene"	2:19
Total length:		40:44

== Personnel ==
Musicians

- Chuck Berry – vocals, guitars, steel guitar on "Deep Feeling"
- Johnnie Johnson – piano
- Willie Dixon – bass
- Fred Below – drums
- L. C. Davis – tenor saxophone on "Too Much Monkey Business" and "Drifting Heart"
- Jasper Thomas – drums
- Ebby Hardy – drums
- Otis Spann – piano
- Jimmy Rogers – guitar
- Jerome Green – maracas on "Maybellene"

Technical

- Leonard Chess – producer
- Phil Chess – producer
- Andy McKaie – reissue producer
- Erick Labson – digital remastering
- Vartan – art direction
- Don Snowden – liner notes

== Charts ==
Chart performance for After School Session
Chart (2026)	Peak position
US Top Blues Albums (Billboard)	14

== Release history ==
Region	Date	Label	Format	Catalog
United States	May 1957	Chess Records	LP	LP-1426
United States	August 27, 1966	Chess Records	Stereo-Pak	21-383A
United States	1990	Chess Records	CD	CHD-9284
United States	May 9, 1995	MCA Special Products	CD	MCAD-20873
United States	March 23, 2004	Geffen Records/Chess Records	Cassette	B0001685
United States	March 23, 2004	Geffen Records/Chess Records	CD	B0001685-02
