= Angel in Disguise =

Angel in Disguise may refer to:

- "Angel in Disguise" (1940 song)
- "Angel in Disguise" (Earl Thomas Conley song)
- "Angel in Disguise" (McCartney–Starr song)
- "Angel in Disguise" (Brandy song)
- "Angel in Disguise" (Musiqq song)
- Angel in Disguise (album), an album by Leon Russell

== See also ==
- Angels in Disguise (disambiguation)
- "(You're the) Devil in Disguise", a song by Elvis Presley
