= Standing Stone (album) =

Studio album by Paul McCartney and London Symphony Orchestra
- Released: 25 September 1997
- Recorded: 30 April – 2 May 1997
- Studio: EMI Studios, Abbey Road
- Genre: Contemporary classical
- Length: 74:46
- Label: EMI Classics
- Producer: John Fraser

Paul McCartney chronology
Flaming Pie (1997)	Standing Stone (1997)	Rushes (1998)

Standing Stone is Paul McCartney's second full-length release of original classical music (coming after 1991's Liverpool Oratorio), although he defined it as orchestral music. It was issued shortly after the release of Flaming Pie. The world premiere performance was held at The Royal Albert Hall on 14 October 1997.

== History ==
Following up on 1991's Paul McCartney's Liverpool Oratorio, the Standing Stone project was composed out of a long poem McCartney authored to describe the way Celtic man might have wondered about the origins of life and the mystery of existence. McCartney composed the work as a commission from Richard Lyttleton, the then president of EMI Classics, to celebrate EMI's centenary. Unlike Liverpool Oratorio, the project was not an operatic performance of a story, but an instrumental one, though employing the use of a choir.

For the first time in his career, McCartney used a personal computer and software to help compose. The work was recorded by the 80-piece London Symphony Orchestra, a 120-member choir, and conducted by Lawrence Foster at EMI's Abbey Road Studios. Standing Stone was engineered by John Kurlander and mixed and edited at Hog Hill Mill Studios, McCartney's private studio in Sussex, England.

It was released on compact disc which included a 48-page booklet. The booklet reprinted in full McCartney's original poem that inspired the project, an essay by Andrew Stewart, and reproductions of two paintings by Paul from 1994 named Standing Stone Story and Standing Stone Story II. A two LP vinyl edition, limited to 2,500 copies, was also released.

The image on the cover is one of the many photos taken by Linda McCartney during late 1969/early 1970 that would initially be seen on the inside gatefold cover of Paul's first album McCartney. This project was her husband's last release before Linda died of breast cancer on 17 April 1998, having been diagnosed almost three years earlier.

A documentary was made during the sessions, The Making of Standing Stone, and subsequently broadcast on BBC and PBS. The world premiere performance at The Royal Albert Hall was also filmed and broadcast on Channel 5 in the UK. The concert and documentary were later released together on DVD.

== Release ==
Professional ratings
Review scores
Source	Rating
AllMusic	3/5 stars
Encyclopedia of Popular Music	2/5 stars
MusicHound	2.5/5 stars
The Rolling Stone Album Guide	2/5 stars

Released on 25 September 1997 in the US, and 29 September in the UK, Paul McCartney's Standing Stone topped the classical music charts, and managed a one-week stand at number 194 on the US pop album listings.

== Track listing ==
All pieces by Paul McCartney.

Movement I – After heavy light years

1. "Fire/Rain" Allegro energico – 4:30
2. "Cell Growth" Semplice – 8:30
3. "'Human' Theme" Maestoso – 3:36

Movement II – He awoke startled

4. "Meditation" Contemplativo – 3:57
5. "Crystal Ship" Con moto scherzando – 2:02
6. "Sea Voyage" Pulsating, with cool jazz feel – 3:39
7. "Lost at Sea" Sognando – 4:37
8. "Release" Allegro con spirito – 1:54

Movement III – Subtle colours merged soft contours

9. "Safe Haven/Standing Stone" Pastorale con moto – 4:11
10. "Peaceful Moment" Andante tranquillo – 2:09
11. "Messenger" Energico – 3:35
12. "Lament" Lamentoso – 2:26
13. "Trance" Misterioso – 5:32
14. "Eclipse" Eroico – 4:57

Movement IV – Strings pluck, horns blow, drums beat

15. "Glory Tales" Trionfale – 2:40
16. "Fugal Celebration" L'istesso tempo. Fresco – 4:25
17. "Rustic Dance" Rustico – 2:00
18. "Love Duet" Andante intimo – 3:43
19. "Celebration" Andante – 6:15

== Personnel ==
- London Symphony Orchestra
- London Symphony Chorus
- Lawrence Foster: conductor
- Janice Graham: leader
- Stephen Westrop: chorus master
