= Angels in Disguise =

Angels in Disguise may refer to:

- Angels in Disguise (film), a 1949 Bowery Boys film
- Angels in Disguise (album), a 2002 album by Interface

== See also ==
- Angel in Disguise (disambiguation)
