= Oobu Joobu =

Radio show by Paul McCartney

Oobu Joobu was a radio show created, directed and presented by Paul McCartney. It was described by McCartney as "wide-screen radio", and consisted of him hosting a mix of various demos, live tracks, outtakes, rehearsals, and other unreleased material from his solo career; plus tracks by other artists that served as his inspiration, all wrapped around behind-the-scenes stories and 'chat'. The program aired in 1995 on the American radio network Westwood One, running for 15 episodes broadcast between May and September. In the opening minutes, McCartney explains that the show's name was inspired by a BBC production of Alfred Jarry's Ubu Cocu.

Because the show's material included many unreleased recordings of Paul McCartney, virtually all of the programs have been bootlegged. As well, in 1997 McCartney has released parts of some shows on disc, and currently, The Beatles Channel on Sirius XM often plays Oobu Joobu clips.

== Shows ==
=== Show 1 ===
Broadcast during the weekend of 27 May 1995.

1. Oobu Joobu Intro – Unreleased McCartney track
2. Take It Away – Studio outtake
3. Talk About The Radioshow – Chat
4. Biker Like An Icon – Soundcheck
5. Oobu Joobu – Rehearsal
6. Oobu Joobu / Good Rockin' Tonight – Partial/Chat
7. Lucille – Paul & Little Richard versions edited together
8. Little Richard's Story / Tutti Frutti – Little Richard
9. Oobu Joobu / Cook of the House – Linda's recipe
10. New Orleans / Oobu Joobu – Unreleased Linda McCartney song
11. Oobu Joobu / "I Wanna Be Your Man" – Paul talks about 1st Rolling Stones' single
12. I Wanna Be Your Man – Soundcheck at the Giant Stadium
13. Oobu Joobu / Story About Paul's Father – Chat
14. Flight of the Bumble Bee – Classical: Wynton Marsalis
15. We Can Work It Out – Soundcheck/Rehearsal
16. Oobu Joobu Superman Jingle / Reggae Story – Chat
17. Butter Cup – Winston Scotland – 7" single.
18. Ou Est Le Soleil? – Home recording & finished version
19. Atlantic Ocean – Unfinished song (partial)
20. A Fairy Tale – Bonus track: Paul at the piano telling a story to his children. Mid-Seventies
21. Welcome Back / About Alan Crowder – Jam
22. Oobu Joobu / Don't Get Around Much Anymore – Studio outtake
23. Papa's Got a Brand New Bag – James Brown
24. They Call My Baby Baby – Soundcheck Jam
25. Boil Crisis / Oobu Joobu Jingle – Part of an unreleased song from the rude corner
26. C Moon – Rehearsal
27. Put It There – Rehearsal
28. My Dad – From TV Show, Chet Atkins
29. Oobu Joobu Jingle / Paul About Buddy – Chat
30. That'll Be The Day – Buddy Holly record
31. It's Now Or Never – Jam
32. Green Sleeves / Talk About Rainforests – Jeff Beck (partial) / Chat
33. Once In A Lifetime – Talking Head record
34. Cumberland Gap – Improvisation
35. Chants – Two women from The Burundi Tribe
36. Oobu Joobu Intro / Ebony And Ivory – Rehearsal with Stevie Wonder
37. Oobu Joobu Outro / Credits / Tutti Frutti

=== Show 2 ===
Broadcast during the weekend of 29 May 1995.

1. Intro – Jingle
2. Ain't That A Shame – Outtake
3. Intro / I'm In Love Again – Fats Domino, Paul sings along
4. Back In The U.S.S.R. – Studio outtake, probably from 1989
5. Intro / Ain't She Sweet – Jonathan & Darlene Edwards
6. Lovers That Never Were – Paul and Elvis Costello. Partial demo / regular
7. This Sad Burlesque – Elvis Costello & The Brodsky Quartet
8. Be-Bop-a-Lula – Soundcheck in Kansas City
9. Intro / The Joker – Steve Miller Band
10. Hey Jude – Rehearsal, mock version
11. Linda's Recipe / Sugertime – Linda sings lead and Paul backing vocals
12. Intro / Spies Like Us – Demo version
13. Let 'Em In – Reggae version by Shinehead
14. Can't Buy Me Love – Soundcheck

=== Show 3 ===
Broadcast during the weekend of 10 June 1995.

1. Intro Oobu Joobu – Includes chat
2. I Love This House – Unfinished track with David Gilmour
3. Knock On Wood – Eddy Floyd single
4. Blue Moon Of Kentucky / Oobu Joobu Jingle – Mix of Monroe, Paul and Elvis versions / Chat
5. We're Gonna Move / Oobu Joobu Jingle – Rehearsal
6. Reggae Intro / No Sun Will Shine – Chat / Bob Marley single
7. We Got Married – Demo
8. Got To Get You Into My Life – Rehearsal
9. Oobu Joobu / Radio Play – Chat / Fun
10. Virginia Plain / Fun / Intro To Blackbird – Roxy Music single
11. Blackbird – Chat / Rehearsal
12. Linda's Recipe / Cook of the House – Linda's recipe / Chat
13. White Coated Man – Linda McCartney's song outtake
14. Welcome Back / Oobu Joobu Time / Introduction – Chat & Jam
15. Singin' The Blues – Soundcheck in Toronto
16. Happy Jack – The Who single
17. Pete Townsend / Oobu Joobu Fun – Chat
18. Rock Island Line – Rehearsal by Paul
19. Oobu Joobu Closing Theme

=== Show 4 ===
Broadcast during the weekend of 12 June 1995.

1. Intro / Oobu Joobu – Intro jingle
2. Love Mix – Unfinished song
3. Stop, You Don't Know Where She Came From – Short demo from rude corner
4. Intro / Tipitina – Song by Professor Longhair
5. Fool on the Hill / Oobu Joobu Jingle – Tour rehearsal
6. Intro / New Moon Over Jamaica – Mix of Paul's demo and Johnny Cash version
7. Intro / Buladance – The Baki Tribe
8. Bring It To Jerome – Soundcheck in Minneapolis
9. Dance of the Cossacks – Nutcracker ballet by The Royal Phil. Orchestra
10. Linda's Recipe / Cook of the House – Linda's Recipe
11. You Know You Are Such An Incredible Thing – Jam session
12. Fixing A Hole / Oobu Joobu Outro – Tour rehearsal
13. Intro / I Lost My Little Girl – Soundcheck
14. Gimme Some Loving – Spencer Davis Group single
15. Comedy – Chat
16. Let It Be – Mock version
17. Let It Be – Rehearsal
18. Oobu Joobu – Outro jingle

=== Show 5 ===
Broadcast during the weekend of 19 June 1995.

1. Intro / Welcome To Oobu Joobu – Chat / Jingle
2. Looking For Changes – Soundcheck in Las Vegas
3. Peace in the Neighbourhood – Soundcheck in Las Vegas
4. Oobu Joobu Jingle / Hold A Candle To This – The Pretenders single
5. Message of Chrissie Hynde – Chat
6. Wildlife – Chat and Music
7. Oobu Joobu Jingle / I Can See Clearly Now – Johnny Nash single
8. Introduction To Mother's Nature Son – Chat
9. Mother Nature Son – Soundcheck
10. Off The Ground – Soundcheck
11. Cook of the House / Linda's Recipe – Linda's Recipe
12. Cow – Linda McCartney and Carla Lane
13. How Many People – Rehearsal
14. We All Stand Together – Original demo
15. 3 Oobu Joobu Introductions – Jingles

=== Show 6 ===
Broadcast during the weekend of 26 June 1995.

1. There's No Business Like Showbusiness / Oobu Joobu – Intro / Jingle
2. Twenty Flight Rock – Rehearsal
3. The Girl Can't Help It – Chat
4. Summertime Blues – Eddy Cochran single
5. Summertime – Soundcheck
6. Reggae Tunes & Highlights – Rude corner / Studio
7. Deacon Blues – Steely Dan single
8. Drive My Car – Rehearsal
9. Oobu Joobu Jingle / You Know My Name / Intro About Brian Jones – Chat / The Beatles track
10. Cook of the House – Linda's recipe
11. Wild Prairie – Paul and Linda outtake
12. Doing It All Day Long – Film music
13. Oobu Joobu – Chat
14. Oobu Joobu / Introduction – Chat / Jingle
15. Courtly Dancers – Julian Breem from Gloriana
16. Give Us A Chord, Roy – Partial outtake from a rude corner
17. Oh Mama, Eh Papa – Soundcheck
18. Oobu Joobu Outro / The Sheik of Araby – Jingle

=== Show 7 ===
Broadcast during the weekend of 3 July 1995.

1. Intro / Oobu Joobu – Jingle
2. Two Instrumental Tracks – From rude corner
3. No I Never – Jam session
4. Sneaking Up Behind You – Instrumental by The Brecker Brothers
5. Oobu Joobu / Welcome Back – Chat
6. Crackin' Up – Soundcheck
7. Loui, Loui – Toots & The Maytells
8. Daytime Nighttime Suffering – Wings' B-side
9. Intro To Bill Haley – Chat
10. Rock Around The Clock – Billy Haley & His Comets
11. Intro To Fanclub Xmas Discs – Chat
12. If I Ever See Another Banjo – Part of The Beatles Xmas flexi
13. Introduction To Love in the Open Air – Chat
14. Love in the Open Air – Family Way Soundtrack
15. Cook of the House – Linda's recipe
16. Hot Soup, Jam & Fools – Improvisation
17. Midland Two Step – Dusee Cajun Band
18. San Francisco Bay Blues – Soundcheck in Detroit
19. After You've Gone – Demo from rude corner
20. Oobu Joobu Outro – Jingle
21. Yellow Submarine – Rehearsal

=== Show 8 ===
Broadcast during the weekend of 10 July 1995.

1. Intro / Oobu Joobu – Jingle
2. Jet – Rehearsal
3. Keep Under Cover – Demo & studio outtake with Stanley Clark
4. Johnny B. Goode – Chuck Berry record
5. Oobu Joobu / Get Out of My Way – Soundcheck in St. Louis
6. Apology – Unknown artist, Jamaica
7. Three Cool Cats – Rehearsal
8. Don't Break The Promises – Demo and Eric Stewart's version
9. Cook of the House – Linda's recipe (Get Sick Recipe)
10. Peacocks – Unreleased song
11. I've Just Seen A Face – Tour rehearsal
12. Music For Glass Harmonica – Studio rehearsal
13. Winedark Open Sea – Rehearsal
14. Welcome To Oobu Joobu – Jingle

=== Show 9 ===
Broadcast during the weekend of 17 July 1995.

1. Intro / Oobu Joobu – Jingle
2. Miss Ann – Soundcheck
3. What's Going On – Marvin Gaye record
4. Blackbird / Blue Moon of Kentucky – Mock version from rehearsal
5. She's A Woman – Rehearsal
6. Uh-Oh 7 – Desmond Dekker Compact Cassette
7. Live And Let Die – Soundcheck
8. S M A – Heather & Paul McCartney
9. Mercury: The Planets Suite – London Philharmonic Orchestra
10. Cut Across Shorty – Rehearsal
11. Hi Heeled Sneakers – Rehearsal
12. Oobu Joobu Intro – Jingle
13. Riders on the Storm – Doors track
14. Rough Ride – With Trevor Horn
15. Cook Of The House / Oobu Joobu Jingle – Linda's recipe
16. Bizarre Beatles Covers – 5 pieces
17. Let Me Roll It – Soundcheck
18. Oobu Joobu Jingle / Let It Be (Let It Lie) – Jingle

=== Show 10 ===
Broadcast during the weekend of 24 July 1995.

1. Intro / Oobu Joobu – Jingle
2. Shake, Rattle And Roll – Long rehearsal
3. Rock It – Herbie Hancock track
4. Oobu Joobu Intro – Jingle
5. Honey Don't – Soundcheck in Detroit
6. If I Were Not Upon The Stage – Partial
7. Intermezzo – Sound effects
8. Like A Hurricane – Neil Young from Unplugged
9. Motor Of Love / Oobu Joobu Outro Jingle – Rude studio demo
10. Feel No Pain – Unknown artist, Jamaica
11. Your School – Unreleased track, partial
12. Get Back – Tour rehearsal
13. Rodina: Song of the Fatherland – Woman's choir, Bulgaria
14. Oobu Joobu – Outtake
15. Oobu Joobu Intro / Cook Of The House – Linda's recipe
16. Tomorrow's Light – Soundcheck in Detroit
17. Three Pieces For Blues Band & Orchestra – William Rousseau
18. Oobu Joobu Outro – Jingle
19. Vocal Jam – Close harmony

=== Show 11 ===
Broadcast during the weekend of 31 July 1995.

1. Oobu Joobu Intro / Yesterday – Jingle / Mock version
2. Matchbox – Rehearsal
3. Blue Suede Shoes – Rehearsal
4. Yesterday – Rehearsal / Mock version
5. Oobu Joobu Jingle – Jingle
6. Christmas Parade – Unknown reggae artist, Jamaica
7. Yesterday – Boyz II Men, partial with commentaries
8. Ballroom Dancing – Film take
9. Ready Teddy / About Yesterday – Little Richard
10. Rockestra Theme – With commentaries
11. Yesterday – Tapped with Duane Eddie
12. Cook of the House – Linda's recipe
13. Garlic – From Mel Brooks' comedy routine "The 2000 Year old Man"
14. Little Daisy Root – Unreleased song
15. 3 Comments on Beatles and Yesterday – Speech
16. Yesterday – Parody
17. 3 Comments on Beatles and Yesterday / Human League – Speech / Human League
18. True Love Party – Carl Perkins and Paul McCartney
19. Get It – Carl Perkins and Paul McCartney
20. Paul and George Martin About Yesterday – Speech
21. Yesterday – Paul live
22. Oobu Joobu Outro – Jingle
23. Yesterday – Parody

=== Show 12 ===
Broadcast during the weekend of 7 August 1995.

1. Oobu Joobu Intro – Jingle
2. Mean Woman Blues – Soundcheck in Winnipeg
3. When the Wind She Blows Cool – Jam in Winnipeg
4. Comedy: Vivian Stanshall – Bonzo Dog (Doo-Dah) Band
5. Outro – Intermezzo
6. Oobu Joobu Jingle / Introduction Coming Up – Chat
7. Coming Up – Outtake
8. I Want Love – Reggae from Jamaica
9. Another Day – Tour rehearsal
10. Praying Mantis / Mambo Baby – 2 pieces from rude corner
11. Oobu Joobu Jingle – Jingle
12. Ann & Nancy Wilson About Wasting Water – Chat
13. What About Love – Heart single
14. Cook of the House / Linda's Recipe – Linda's recipe
15. Sheep May Safely Graze / Paul About Meat – Go Veggie chat
16. Instrumental Incl. Oobu Joobu Jingles – Another different instrumental
17. Oobu Joobu Jingle – Jingle
18. Beautiful Boy – John Lennon
19. Oobu Joobu Jingle – Jingle
20. Midnight Special – Tour rehearsal
21. Oobu Joobu Outro – Jingle

=== Show 13 ===
Broadcast during the weekend of 14 August 1995.

1. Oobu Joobu Intro – Jingle
2. Sweetest Little Show In Town – Rude Studios
3. There's No Me Without You – The Manhattans
4. Gonna Set His Town On Fire Tonight – Outtake
5. Suzy Q – Jamaice reggae
6. Mr. Froggie Went A-Courtin – Rehearsal
7. Sunny Goodge Street – Donovan
8. Soundcheck Song – Improvisation
9. Every Night – Soundcheck in Cincinnati
10. Oobu Joobu Jingle – Jingle
11. Cook of the House / Linda's Recipe – Linda's recipe
12. Endless Days And Lonely Nights – Linda McCartney
13. Be A Vegetarian – Demo
14. Ivory Madonna – UB 40
15. Outro – Jingle
16. Things We Said Today – Rehearsal
17. Devoted To You – Everly Brothers
18. Don't Let The Sun Catch You Cryin' – Rehearsal in Cincinnati
19. Oobu Joobu Outro – Jingle
20. The Entertainer – Film music

=== Show 14 ===
Broadcast during the weekend of 19 August 1995.

1. Intro – Oobu Joobu Jingle
2. Lady Madonna – Soundcheck
3. Bring It On Home To Me – Rehearsal
4. (Sittin' On) The Dock of the Bay / Oobu Joobu Jingle – Otis Redding / Jingle
5. Intro – Jingle
6. Tequilla – Rehearsal
7. Goldfinger – Reggae
8. Intro to Song / Wanderlust – Demo
9. Chinese Canon – World Music
10. Intro Jingle / Cook of the House / Linda's Recipe – Linda's recipe
11. Pull Away – Soundcheck
12. Gymnopédies – Piano music by Pascale Rogier
13. This One / Put It There – Two parodies
14. Oobu Joobu Jingle – Jingle with Phil Collins
15. Reason To Believe – Tim Hardin
16. I Keep On Believing / Love Awake – Rude Studios
17. Hey Jude – Rehearsal-Parody
18. Hey Jude – Rehearsal
19. Oobu Joobu Outro – Jingle
20. Love Me Tender – Parody

=== Show 15 ===
Broadcast during the weekend of 1–4 September 1995.

1. Intro Jingle – Jingle
2. Ain't That A Shame – Outtake
3. I'm In Love Again – Fats Domino
4. Back In The U.S.S.R. – Rehearsal
5. We'll Be Right Back – Vocals
6. New Moon Over Jamaica – Mix of Paul's demo and Johnny Cash version
7. Introduction To Baki Tribe – Chants
8. Bring It On Home To Me – Soundcheck in Minneapolis
9. Good Rockin' Tonight / Introduction Little Richard – Acoustic jam
10. Lucille / Lucille – Mixed together Paul's and Little Richard's versions
11. Little Richard's Veg Story / Tutti Frutti – Little Richard
12. Radio Play / Oobu Joobu Jingle – Fun intermezzo
13. Cook of the House / Linda's Recipe – Linda's recipe
14. New Orleans / Oobu Joobu Jingle – Unreleased Linda's song
15. I Love This House – Unfinished track with David Gilmour
16. Knock On Wood – Eddy Floyd single
17. Blue Moon Of Kentucky Mix / Oobu Joobu Jingle – Mix of versions by Monroe, Paul and Elvis
18. We're Gonna Move / Oobu Joobu Jingle – Rehearsal
19. Ode To A Koala Bear – Bonus track: Alternate Take
20. Oobu Joobu Intro / Yesterday – Jingle / Parody
21. Love Mix – Unfinished song (partial)
22. Stop You Don't Know Where She Came From – Demo from rude corner
23. Tiptina – Professor Longhair
24. Oobu Joobu / I Wanna Be Your Man – Paul talks about first Rolling Stones' single
25. I Wanna Be Your Man – Soundcheck in New York City
26. Oobu Joobu Jingle / Paul About His Dad – Chat
27. Flight of the Bumble Bee – Marsalis
28. We Can Work it Out – Soundcheck / rehearsal
29. Hey Jude – Mock version
30. Paul On Brian Wilson / God Only Knows – Partial
31. God Only Knows – Elvis Costello & Brodsky Quartet
32. One After 909 – Paul with Elvis Costello & Brodsky Quartet.
33. Lady Madonna – Paul with Elvis Costello & Brodsky Quartet.
34. Paul About Pet Sounds / You Still Believe In Me – Chat Paul / The Beach Boys
35. Brian Wilson – Chat
36. Orange Crate Art – Brian Wilson
37. Brian Wilson At The Piano: Hey Jude / She's Leaving Home – Chatting and singing.
38. San Francisco – Brian Wilson.
39. Oobu Jobu's Thank You's – Summing up team.
40. C'mon People – Soundcheck.
41. Oobu Joobu Outro – Last jingle.

== Singles ==
Parts from the Oobu Joobu radio series were officially released on McCartney's Flaming Pie related singles in 1997. The pieces are mostly 10-minute jumbles of various demos, rehearsal, live, and unreleased recordings.

- The "Young Boy" singles have:

"Oobu Joobu" (part 1) – 9:55 (UK CD 1)
"Oobu Joobu" (part 2) – 10:19 (UK CD 2)

- "The World Tonight" singles have:

"Oobu Joobu" (part 1) – 9:55 (on the US version)
"Oobu Joobu" (part 3) – 9:48 (UK CD 1)
"Oobu Joobu" (part 4) – 7:06 (UK CD 2)

- The "Beautiful Night" singles have:

"Oobu Joobu" (part 5) – 10:11 (UK CD 1)
"Oobu Joobu" (part 6) – 9:15 (UK CD 2)

=== Part 1 ===
"Oobu Joobu" (Part 1) contains:

1. "Some Folks Say Oobu"
2. "Oobu Joobu Main Theme"
3. Fun Packed Radio Show
4. "I Love This House"
5. "Clock Work"
6. Paul talks about "Young Boy"
7. "Oobu Joobu We Love You"
8. "Oobu Joobu Main Theme"

=== Part 2 ===
"Oobu Joobu" (Part 2) contains:

1. Wide Screen Radio
2. "Oobu Joobu We Love You"
3. "Oobu Joobu Main Theme"
4. Brilliant, What's Next
5. "Atlantic Ocean"
6. Paul Reminisces
7. "Bouree"
8. "Oobu Joobu We Love You"
9. "Oobu Joobu Main Theme"

=== Part 3 ===
"Oobu Joobu" (Part 3) contains:

1. Intro chat
2. "Oobu Joobu Main Theme"
3. "Squid"
4. Paul talks about "The World Tonight"
5. Link
6. "Oobu Joobu Main Theme"

=== Part 4 ===
"Oobu Joobu" (Part 4) contains:

1. Intro chat
2. "Oobu Joobu Main Theme"
3. Link
4. "Don't Break The Promise"
5. Paul talks about reggae
6. Link
7. "Oobu Joobu Main Theme"

=== Part 5 ===
"Oobu Joobu" (Part 5) contains:

1. "And Now"
2. "Oobu Joobu Main Theme"
3. Beautiful Night Chat
4. Paul and Ringo talk about "Beautiful Night"
5. Ringo Chat
6. "Beautiful Night (Flaming Pie Mix)"
7. "Beautiful Night (Original Version)"
8. Goodbyes
9. "Oobu Joobu Main Theme"

=== Part 6 ===
"Oobu Joobu" (Part 6) contains:

1. "This One" (jingle)
2. "Oobu Joobu Main Theme"
3. "Oobu Joobu We Love You"
4. Paul talks about Abbey Road
5. "Strawberry Fields Forever" (Paul solo)
6. Paul talks about Abbey Road
7. "Come on Baby"
8. Paul talks about Abbey Road
9. "Come on Baby (contd.)"
10. Paul ends chat about Abbey Road
11. "Okay are You Ready" (jingle)
12. "Love Mix"
13. "Widescreen Radio" (jingle)
14. Goodbye
15. "Oobu Joobu Main Theme"

== Ecology ==
On 14 May 1997, Best Buy released an album titled Oobu Joobu Ecology. The CD, an edited version of Show 5 in the radio series, was banded as one single 41:52 track. It was limited to 3000 copies.

1. "Oobu Joobu Main Theme" (spoken intro followed by the program's main theme) – 2:05
2. "Looking for Changes" (soundcheck) – 2:41
3. "Peace in the Neighbourhood" (soundcheck) – 4:55
4. Ecological statement from Chrissie Hynde (spoken part) – 0:58
5. "Wild Life" (edited version of the original track) – 5:18
6. "Mother Nature's Son" (soundcheck) – 2:51
7. "Off the Ground" (soundcheck) – 4:10
8. Linda's "Recipe Cook of the House", gives us, "Beefless Stroganoff" (spoken part) – 1:59
9. "Cow" (different version from the one on the "Wide Prairie" album) – 3:51
10. "How Many People" (rehearsal segued into the original track) – 4:32
11. "We All Stand Together" (demo segued into the original track) – 2:42
