= Angel in Disguise (McCartney–Starr song) =

"Angel in Disguise" is a song co-written by Paul McCartney and Ringo Starr that has never been released.

The song was intended for Ringo's 1992 Time Takes Time album; however, it did not make it onto the album, and therefore remains an intriguing, publicly unheard song. Had it been released in 1992 it would have been the first McCartney-Starkey composition on record, although there were Beatles songs that were credited to Lennon–McCartney–Starkey and Lennon–McCartney–Harrison–Starkey.

== Recording ==
McCartney sent Starr an unfinished demo of the song, to which Starr added an extra verse. Backing tracks for the song were recorded on 9 September 1991 at Conway Studios, in Los Angeles, produced by Peter Asher.

== About the song ==
There have been several documented mentions of the song.

From Rolling Stone, 1992: "Working with (Peter) Asher, Starr recorded a cover of The Posies' "Golden Blunders" and a version of a previously unfinished Paul McCartney composition, "Angel In Disguise", to which Starr added a new verse."

From Alan Clayson's biography of Ringo Starr titled Ringo Starr: Straight Man Or Joker?: Among tracks short-listed were a (Jeff) Lynne original ("Call Me"), Rick Suchow's "What Goes Around" - picked as the singalong finale — a version of Elvis Presley's "Don't Be Cruel", and songs written by Ringo either alone, with Paul McCartney (the remaindered "Angel In Disguise"), or with Johnny Warman." It appears that the song written by Rick Suchow ("What Goes Around") was the last song picked for the album, and as a result the McCartney–Starkey song was shelved, and not subsequently released.

From the Ringo Starr interview in Beatlefan, 1992: "You see, they expected that because it's McCartney and Starr, anyone in their right mind would put that on. It just didn't fit the space we needed on the album... this is my best shot, in my opinion, of my album."

== Auction sale ==
An unheard record of the song penned by Sir Paul McCartney and Sir Ringo Starr has been put up for online auction through Omega Auctions and is expected to be sold for around £20,000.

The unheard record appears on a cassette tape which is part of British DJ Tony Prince's collection.

The lot description explains that there are two versions of the song on the tape, with the first rendition featuring McCartney singing the lyrics over a piano and drum machine, and the second version featuring "a full backing track, backing singers, increased instrumentation including harmonica, guitar and more".

The tape has been given an estimated price of £10,000 to £20,000.

== See also ==
- "Really Love You"
- "Beautiful Night"
- "Home to Us", an officially released duet between McCartney and Starr
