= Run Devil Run (Paul McCartney song) =

Promotional single by Paul McCartney

from the album Run Devil Run
- Released: 4 October 1999 (UK); 5 October 1999 (US)
- Recorded: 3 March 1999
- Studio: Abbey Road Studios, London
- Genre: Rock and roll
- Length: 2:36
- Label: Parlophone
- Songwriter: Paul McCartney

"Run Devil Run" is a song by the English musician Paul McCartney, released as the title track on his 1999 covers album Run Devil Run. It was written in a Chuck Berry style, and is one of the three original songs on the album along with "Try Not to Cry", and "What It Is", and was also released as a promotional 7" vinyl single.

== Title and lyrics ==
The title originated from the name of a brand of bath salts or Run Devil Run oil a folk remedy to ward off evildoers which McCartney had picked up at Miller's Rexall Drugs, a hoodoo store in Atlanta. The mock up of a shop with the name "Run Devil Run" on the album cover is of Miller's Rexall Drugs, with the name altered to fit the title song. In the album press release interview prior to release of the album the interviewer asked McCartney about the genesis of the title track. McCartney answered as follows:

I was in Atlanta with my son and he wanted to visit the funky side of town. So we went down there and were just wandering around the block and we came across this sort of voodoo shop selling cures for everything. I was looking in the shop window and I saw this bottle of bath salts called Ran Devil Run. I thought that was a good title for a song. So when I was on holiday after that I started thinking of words for it and it came quite easily - 'Run Devil Run, the angels having fun, making, winners out of sinners, better leave before he's done, and when he gets through he'll be coming after you, so listen to what I'm telling you, run Devil run.'

After continuing to describe the process of the lyrics, written while sailing, McCartney said that he himself was planning to use the Run Devil Run bath salts:

Yeah, I'm getting the bath salts and I'll be taking a bath with them. Not that I have got many demons to get rid of but there may be one or two lurking and this stuff is definitely going to do the trick.
