= Run Devil Run oil =

Oil used by Mexican folk healers

Run Devil Run oil is one of several charm oils used by Mexican curandero folk healers supposedly to ward off bad luck and remove jinxes. Other names include "Vete Diablo", "Corre Diablo", "Contra Enemigo", "Keep Away Evil" oil, and so on.

The oil was mentioned in a Los Angeles Times article in April 1992, which described the sale in a botánica of bottles of "Go Away Evil" oil and "Run Devil Run" bath oil – credited with keeping gang members away.

The oil came to more widespread prominence in 1999 after Paul McCartney named one of his songs "Run Devil Run" and used the song as the title track for his album of the same name.
