= Miller's Rexall Drugs =

Coordinates: 33.75227°N 84.393246°W

Paul McCartney's 1999 Run Devil Run album cover featuring the Miller's Rexall Drugs store, but with the store's name altered on the sign

Miller's Rexall Drugs is a landmark hoodoo and homeopathic remedy shop in South Downtown Atlanta .

Owner Donald Miller opened a Rexall pharmacy in 1960 and moved to the present location at 87 Broad St. in 1965. Miller, descended from Polish Jews, has been cited as an example that one does not have to be a hoodoo practitioner in order to sell hoodoo supplies. The store originally opened as an ordinary pharmacy but due to customer requests for homeopathic and hoodoo remedies, Miller started carrying them.

In 1994, then-owner Richard Miller (Donald Miller's nephew) began a website and by 2010 Miller's Internet sales had risen to over $1 million per year, far exceeding sales from walk-in customers.

In 1999, Paul McCartney happened upon the drugstore, saw "Run Devil Run" bath salts in the display window and bought them. He named his next album Run Devil Run after the salts. The store is pictured on the album cover but with the name "Miller's" changed to "Earl's".

Miller's is one of several businesses still remaining in a block of Broad Street struggling to reverse a decline. The block was at the heart of what had been a busy shopping district including the flagship Rich's store, but which has continued to decline since the 1960s.
