= Flaming Pie =

Studio album by Paul McCartney
- Released: 5 May 1997
- Recorded: 3 September 1992 ("Calico Skies" and "Great Day"); 22 February – 11 May 1995; 1 November 1995 – 14 February 1997
- Studios: Abbey Road, London; AIR, London; Sun Valley, Idaho; Hogg Hill Mill, Icklesham
- Genre: Rock
- Length: 53:47
- Labels: Parlophone (UK); Capitol (US)
- Producers: Paul McCartney (all tracks); Jeff Lynne (tracks 1, 2, 7, 8, 10–13); George Martin (tracks 6, 14)

Paul McCartney chronology
Strawberries Oceans Ships Forest (1993)	Flaming Pie (1997)	Standing Stone (1997)

Paul McCartney studio album chronology
Off the Ground (1993)	Flaming Pie (1997)	Run Devil Run (1999)

Singles from Flaming Pie
- 1. "Young Boy" Released: 8 April 1997; 2. "The World Tonight" Released: 6 May 1997; 3. "Beautiful Night" Released: 15 December 1997

Flaming Pie is the eleventh solo studio album by the English musician Paul McCartney, released on 5 May 1997 by Parlophone in the UK and Capitol Records in the US. His first studio album in over four years, it was mostly recorded after McCartney's involvement in the highly successful Beatles Anthology project. The album was recorded in several locations over two years, between 1995 and 1997, featuring two songs dating from 1992.

The album featured several of McCartney's family members and friends, most notably McCartney's son, James McCartney featured on electric guitar. In Flaming Pie's liner notes, McCartney said: "[The Beatles Anthology] reminded me of the Beatles' standards and the standards that we reached with the songs. So in a way it was a refresher course that set the framework for this album."

Flaming Pie peaked at number two in both the UK and the US and was certified gold. The album, which was well received by critics, also reached the top 20 in many other countries. From its release up to mid-2007, the album sold over 1.5 million copies. The album was reissued on 31 July 2020 as a part of the Paul McCartney Archive Collection with bonus tracks, outtakes and demos.

The album is ranked number 988 in the third edition of Colin Larkin's book All-Time Top 1000 Albums (2000).

== Background ==
An early version of "Beautiful Night" was recorded in 1986. Two songs hailed from a September 1992 session produced by George Martin, when McCartney was finishing his album Off the Ground (1993): "Calico Skies", (Note: "Calico Skies" was written when McCartney tried to write something similar to the Beatles' "Blackbird".) which McCartney had written when Hurricane Bob hit while he was staying on Long Island in 1991; and "Great Day", a song McCartney and his wife Linda used to perform for their young children, which features backing vocals from Linda.

Beginning in the mid-1990s and extending four years, McCartney was involved in The Beatles Anthology, a documentary on the history of the Beatles. During 1995, as the Anthology albums were starting to be released over a two-year period, EMI did not want McCartney to release a solo album in the meantime. McCartney said that he "was almost insulted at first" before then realising that "it would be silly to go out against yourself in the form of the Beatles. So I fell in with the idea and thought, 'Great, I don't even have to think about an album.'" McCartney was occupied with working on his second classical album Standing Stone (1997) in the interim.

The title Flaming Pie (also given to one of the album's songs) is a reference to an anecdote that John Lennon told in a humorous story published in magazine Mersey Beat in 1961 about the origin of the Beatles' name: "It came in a vision – a man appeared on a flaming pie and said unto them, 'from this day on you are Beatles with an A.' "

== Recording and structure ==
Two tracks ("Calico Skies" and "Great Day") were recorded on 3 September 1992 with George Martin co-producing. At the time, the Flaming Pie album had not yet been conceived, and the tracks were shelved for some unspecified future use.

Beginning in February 1995, McCartney teamed up with Jeff Lynne, leader, songwriter, arranger and producer for Electric Light Orchestra. An ardent Beatles fan, Lynne had previously worked with former Beatle George Harrison on his 1987 album Cloud Nine and in the Traveling Wilburys, with former Beatle Ringo Starr on his 1992 album Time Takes Time, and with the Beatles themselves on "Free as a Bird" and "Real Love" for their Anthology project. Intending to produce something pure and easy – and without elaborate productions – McCartney sporadically recorded the entire album in a space of two years, working not only with Lynne, but also with Steve Miller. (Note: Miller and McCartney had worked together once before, on 1969's "My Dark Hour", at Abbey Road Studios. After finding out his son, James, was a fan of Miller, McCartney decided to renew their friendship.) The album also featured the Beatles producer George Martin and drummer Ringo Starr, as well as his own son, James McCartney, who plays lead guitar on "Heaven on a Sunday". McCartney wrote the song "Young Boy" while his wife Linda was making lunch for a New York Times feature on 18 August 1994. McCartney and Miller started recording "Young Boy" on 22 February 1995 in Sun Valley, Idaho. According to what assistant engineer Frank Farrel told author Luca Perasi, McCartney recorded his drum parts separately, with snare, bass drum and toms first, and later overdubbing cymbal crashes. They reconvened a few months afterwards in May at McCartney's home studio, Hog Hill Mill, recording – a song described as a "road song" – "If You Wanna" and the jam track "Used to Be Bad" in the process.

The duo also recorded the B-side "Broomstick" and three unreleased tracks: "(Sweet Home) Country Girl", "Soul Boy", and an untitled song. Also in May, McCartney, by himself, recorded the unreleased tracks "Stella May Day", for his daughter Stella McCartney, which would be used playing over loudspeakers at her fashion shows, and "Whole Life" with Dave Stewart. (Note: McCartney would later re-record "Whole Life" in 2003.) "Somedays", which was written while McCartney was escorting Linda to Kent for a photo shoot, features an orchestration score by George Martin. "The Song We Were Singing", (Note: McCartney plays a stand-up bass on the track. The bass originally belonged to Elvis Presley's bassist, Bill Black.) which was about the times McCartney and his former songwriting partner John Lennon were at 20 Forthlin Road, was recorded in 3/4 time. "Little Willow" was written for the children of Starr's first wife, Maureen Starkey Tigrett, who had recently died of cancer. "Souvenir" features the sound of a 78 rpm record towards the end of the track. The title track, recorded in a four-hour session, is in similar style to that of the Beatles' "Lady Madonna".

In May 1996, Starr and McCartney were working on a track that McCartney had started a decade earlier, "Beautiful Night", which featured vocals from Starr. Lynne showed up the next day and the trio, with McCartney on bass, Starr on drums, and Lynne on guitar, jammed, with the finished results being the track "Really Love You", the first track credited to McCartney–Starkey. McCartney and Starr also recorded the B-side "Looking for You" and an untitled song. "Heaven on a Sunday", which was written while McCartney was in the US sailing on holiday, was recorded on 16 September 1996, and features backing vocals by both Linda and James. Martin added orchestration to "Beautiful Night", on 14 February 1997 at Abbey Road Studios. An unreleased song recorded with Lynne producing, titled "Cello in the Ruins", was registered for copyright in 1994, although work on the song began in May 1995. The track was almost issued as a single for War Child's The Help Album in 1995. This album was the last McCartney studio album to feature vocals and participation from Linda, who died of breast cancer in 1998.

== Reception ==
=== Critical ===
Professional ratings
Review scores
Source	Rating
AllMusic	4.5/5 stars
Blender	4/5 stars
The Encyclopedia of Popular Music	4/5 stars
Entertainment Weekly	B−
The Guardian	4/5 stars
Los Angeles Times	3/4 stars
NME	5/10
Q	4/5 stars
Rolling Stone	3/5 stars
USA Today	3/4 stars

Upon its 1997 release, on 5 May in the UK on Parlophone and on 20 May in the US on Capitol, the critical reaction to Flaming Pie was strong, with McCartney achieving his best reviews since 1982's Tug of War. Stephen Thomas Erlewine at AllMusic stated that the album achieved McCartney's goal of creating "an album that was stripped-back, immediate, and fun, one less studied and produced" than his most recent preceding albums, resulting in a "direct and unassuming" product. He praised McCartney's more simplistic numbers on the album, concluding that he "is at his best when he doesn't try so hard and lets his effortless melodic gifts rise to the surface." Writing for Blender, Jody Rosen noticed "a distinctly Beatles aura" throughout the record which left McCartney sounding rejuvenated, choosing opener "The Song We Were Singing" as a standout track. In the Encyclopedia of Popular Music, Colin Larkin noted that the album was a return to form for McCartney, praising Lynne's production and hailing it as "most definitely for lovers of the Beatles' White Album". According to The Los Angeles Times' Elysa Gardner, McCartney sounded "more inspired and, well, less goofy than he [had] in years" on Flaming Pie. She praised the stripped-down production of the album for showcasing McCartney performing at his strong suits, among them the rock songs "The World Tonight" and "Young Boy" and the gentler "Little Willow" and "Heaven on a Sunday".

Entertainment Weekly's Chris Willman was more critical of the album's front half; according to Willman, "several of the most enjoyable bits are the slightish tunes designed as throwaways," namely the title track, "Young Boy", "Used to Be Bad" and "Really Love You". He was more complimentary of the album's latter portion, praising the lyrical honesty in "Souvenir", "Beautiful Night", and "Great Day". Anthony DeCurtis of Rolling Stone had a mixed reaction to the album, finding it less indulgent in nostalgia than his recently preceded work at the time and noting the musical sparsity in its production, among them the title track and "The World Tonight". However, DeCurtis took issue with "the troubling issues the album raises — aging, the meaning of the past, the instability of the future" — contrasting with love songs such as "Young Boy" and "Somedays". NME was unenthusiastic about the album. Paul Moody remarked that McCartney was "apparently content to finally admit his best work is behind him", panning "Young Boy" as a single but finding nostalgic, redeeming qualities in "The Song We Were Singing" and "Calico Skies".

=== Commercial ===
With fresh credibility, even with young fans who had been introduced to him through the Anthology project, it debuted at number 2 in the UK in May, giving McCartney his best new entry since Flowers in the Dirt eight years before. It was kept off the top spot by the Spice Girls' album Spice. Flaming Pie was also received positively in the United States, where it became McCartney's first top-10 album since Tug of War. Flaming Pie debuted at number 2, with 121,000 copies sold in its first week, behind Spice, which sold 16,500 more copies that week. In both the UK and the US, Flaming Pie was the most commercially successful new entry, and was certified gold in both countries. It was also certified gold in Norway. According to Nielsen SoundScan, the album had sold over 1.5 million copies worldwide up to June 2007.

Three singles were released from the album, "Young Boy", "The World Tonight" and "Beautiful Night", all of which were also released as picture discs, and all became UK top-40 hits. The only single in the US from the album was "The World Tonight", released on 17 April 1997, a top-30 entry on the Billboard Mainstream Rock listing. To promote the album, McCartney held an online chat party on 17 May 1997, and the event entered the Guinness Book of World Records for the most questions asked by people on a website in the span of 30 minutes, with three million inquiries.

In the World Tonight, a film about the making of the album, was broadcast in the UK on ITV, and on VH1 in the US, around the release of the album. Also broadcast was an hour-long radio show about the album on 5 May 1997 on BBC Radio 2. It received a Grammy nomination for Album of the Year, although Bob Dylan won the award with his album Time Out of Mind. "Young Boy" and "The World Tonight" appeared in the 1997 Ivan Reitman comedy Fathers' Day. Flaming Pie was reissued on 31 July 2020 as a part of the Paul McCartney Archive Collection. Bonus tracks include home demos, outtakes, rough mixes and selections from the radio series Oobu Joobu.

== Track listing ==
All tracks are written by Paul McCartney, except where noted.

Flaming Pie track listing
No.	Title	Writer(s)	Producer	Length
1.	"The Song We Were Singing"		Paul McCartney, Jeff Lynne	3:54
2.	"The World Tonight"		McCartney, Lynne	4:04
3.	"If You Wanna"		McCartney	4:37
4.	"Somedays"		McCartney	4:15
5.	"Young Boy"		McCartney	3:54
6.	"Calico Skies"		McCartney, George Martin	2:32
7.	"Flaming Pie"		McCartney, Lynne	2:29
8.	"Heaven on a Sunday"		McCartney, Lynne	4:26
9.	"Used to Be Bad" (duet with Steve Miller)	McCartney, Miller	McCartney	4:12
10.	"Souvenir"		McCartney, Lynne	3:40
11.	"Little Willow"		McCartney, Lynne	2:58
12.	"Really Love You"	McCartney, Richard Starkey	McCartney, Lynne	5:18
13.	"Beautiful Night"		McCartney, Lynne	5:04
14.	"Great Day"		McCartney, Martin	2:09

== Personnel ==
Credits adapted from CD liner notes.

Musicians

- Paul McCartney – lead vocal (1–14), harmony vocal (1, 2, 7), electric guitar (1–3, 7–8, 10–13), acoustic guitar (1, 2, 4–6, 8, 10, 11, 13–14), bass guitar (1–5, 7–13), double bass (1), harmonium (1, 11), drums (2, 3, 5, 7–10), piano (2, 7, 10–11, 13), percussion (2, 6, 8, 13–14), 12-string acoustic guitar (3), Spanish guitar (4, 11), Hammond organ (5, 13), knee slap (6), backing vocals (8, 10–13), acoustic solo (8), Fender Rhodes (8), harpsichord (8, 10, 11), vibraphone (8), mellotron (11), percussion effects (11), Wurlitzer piano (12–13), leg slap (14)
- Jeff Lynne – harmony vocal (1, 2, 7), electric guitar (1, 2, 7, 10, 12–13), acoustic guitar (1, 2, 8, 10, 13), keyboard (1, 2, 10), backing vocals (8, 10–13), electric spinette harpsichord (11)
- Steve Miller – harmony vocal (3), electric guitar (3, 5, 9), acoustic guitar (3), backing vocal (5), rhythm guitar (5), lead vocal (9)
- James McCartney – electric guitar solo (8)
- Linda McCartney – backing vocals (8, 13, 14)
- Ringo Starr – drums (12–13), ending backing vocal (13), percussion (13)

Orchestral musicians

- Violins – Keith Pascoe (4, 13), Jackie Hartley (4, 13), Rita Manning (4, 13), Peter Manning (4), Marcia Crayford (13), Adrian Levin (13), Belinda Bunt (13), Bernard Patridge (13), David Woodcock (13), Roger Garland (13), Julian Tear (13), Briony Shaw (13), Jeremy Williams (13), David Ogden (13), Bogustav Kostecki (13), Maciej Rakowski (13), Jonathan Rees (13)
- Celli – Christian Kampen (4), Martin Loveday (4, 13), Anthony Pleeth (13), Stephen Orton (13), Robert Bailey (13)
- Violas – Peter Lale (4), Levine Andrade (4, 13), Robert Smissen (13), Stephen Tess (13), Philip Dukes (13), Ivo Van Der Werff (13), Graeme Scott (13)
- Alto flute – Andy Findon (4)
- Flutes – Martin Parry (4), Michael Cox (4), Susan Milan (13)
- Percussion – Gary Kettel (4)
- Harp – Skaila Kanga (4)
- Oboes – Roy Carter (4), David Theodore (13)
- Cor anglais – Roy Carter (4)
- French horns – Michael Thompson (8), Richard Bissill (8), Richard Watkins (8), John Pigneguy (8)
- Trumpets – Kevin Robinson (10), John Barclay (13), Andrew Crowley (13), Mark Bennett (13)
- Saxophones – Chris 'Snake' Davis (10)
- Baritone saxophone – Dave Bishop (10)
- Trombones – Richard Edwards (13), Andy Fawbert (13)
- Horns – Michael Thompson (13), Richard Watkins (13), Nigel Black (13)
- Doubles basses – Chris Laurence (13), Robin McGee (13)

Technical

- Linda McCartney – all photography
- Mark Lewisohn – sleevenotes
- Geoff Baker – sleevenotes
- Greg Calbi – mastering
- The Team – design
- Jeff Lynne – producer (1, 2, 7, 8, 10–13)
- Paul McCartney – producer (1–14)
- Geoff Emerick – engineer (1–5, 7–13), orchestral session engineer (4, 13)
- Jon Jacobs – engineer (1–5, 7–13), orchestral session engineer (13)
- Keith Smith – assistant engineer (1–5, 7–13)
- Marc Mann – digital sequencing (1)
- Geoff Foster – orchestral session assistant engineer (4)
- David Snell – conductor (4, 13)
- Frank Farrell – assistant engineer (5)
- George Martin – producer (6, 14), orchestration (13)
- Bob Kraushaar – engineer (6, 14)
- Peter Cobbin – orchestral session engineer (13)
- Paul Hicks – orchestral session assistant engineer (13)

== Charts ==
=== Weekly charts ===
Original album
Chart (1997)	Peak position
Australian ARIA Albums Chart	9
Austrian Albums Chart	6
Belgian Albums Chart (Flanders)	19
Belgian Wallonia Albums Chart	29
Canadian Albums Chart	10
Danish Albums Chart	4
Dutch Mega Albums Chart	9
European Albums Chart	3
Finnish Albums Chart	28
French SNEP Albums Chart	23
German Media Control Albums Chart	6
Italian Albums Chart	3
Japanese Oricon Weekly Albums Chart	14
New Zealand Albums Chart	23
Norwegian Albums Chart	3
Spanish Albums Chart	5
Swedish Albums Chart	11
Swiss Albums Chart	10
UK Albums Chart	2
US Billboard 200	2

Reissue
Chart (2020)	Peak position
German Albums (Offizielle Top 100)	7
UK Albums Chart	14
US Billboard 200	74

=== Year-end charts ===
Chart (1997)	Position
German Albums Chart	79
UK Albums Chart	82
US Billboard 200 Year-end	138

== Certifications and sales ==
Region	Certification	Certified units/sales
Japan (RIAJ)	Gold	65,000
Norway (IFPI Norway)	Gold	25,000^{*}
United Kingdom (BPI)	Gold	140,000
United States (RIAA)	Gold	676,000
^{*} Sales figures based on certification alone.
