= No Other Baby =

1958 single by The Vipers

Single by the Vipers
- B-side: "Baby Why?"
- Released: 1958
- Genre: Skiffle
- Label: Parlophone
- Songwriters: Dickie Bishop, Bob Watson
- Producer: George Martin

"No Other Baby" is a song written by Dickie Bishop and Bob Watson, originally recorded in 1957 by Dickie Bishop and the Sidekicks. Early cover versions were recorded by the Vipers (1958) (produced by George Martin), Bobby Helms (1959), Paul & Paula (1964), Chad & Jeremy and Four Jacks and a Jill (1965).

== Paul McCartney version ==
"No Other Baby"

Single by Paul McCartney

from the album Run Devil Run
- B-side: "Brown Eyed Handsome Man"; "Fabulous"
- Released: 24 October 1999
- Recorded: 5 March 1999
- Studio: Abbey Road Studios
- Genre: Rock and Roll
- Length: 4:17
- Label: Parlophone
- Songwriters: Dickie Bishop, Bob Watson
- Producers: Paul McCartney; Chris Thomas

Paul McCartney singles chronology
"'Fluid (Nitin Sawhney Remixes)'" (1999)	"No Other Baby" (1999)	"Vo!ce" (1999)

Paul McCartney recorded "No Other Baby" for his 1999 cover album Run Devil Run and released it as the only single from the album. The song reached number 42 on the UK singles chart.

The McCartney version was released as a 7" single and two CD singles, one of which was mixed in mono.

7" single (R 6527)

1. "No Other Baby" (Dickie Bishop/Bob Watson) – 4:17
2. "Brown Eyed Handsome Man" (Chuck Berry) – 2:27
3. "Fabulous" – 2:15

CD Stereo single (CD R 6527)

1. "No Other Baby" (Bishop/Watson) – 4:17
2. "Brown Eyed Handsome Man" (Berry) – 2:27
3. "Fabulous" (Bernie Lowe/Kal Mann) – 2:15

CD Mono single (CDRS 6527)

1. "No Other Baby" (Bishop/Watson) – 4:17
2. "Brown Eyed Handsome Man" (Berry) – 2:27
3. "Fabulous" (Lowe/Mann) – 2:15

A music video by Paul McCartney performing "No Other Baby" was released by Gareth Francis.

== Personnel ==
According to The Paul McCartney Project:

- Paul McCartney – vocals, bass guitar, electric guitar
- David Gilmour – backing vocals, electric guitar
- Mick Green – electric guitar
- Pete Wingfield – hammond organ
- Ian Paice – drums
