= Down Bound Train =

Single by Chuck Berry

from the album After School Session
- A-side: "No Money Down"
- Released: January 1956
- Recorded: December 1955
- Studio: Universal Recording Corp. (Chicago)
- Genre: Rock and roll
- Label: Chess 1615
- Songwriter: Chuck Berry

Chuck Berry singles chronology
"Thirty Days" (1955)	"Down Bound Train" (1956)	"Roll Over Beethoven" (1956)

Down Bound Train is a song written by Chuck Berry. It was inspired by Berry's "fire and brimstone" religious upbringing.

It is a song about redemption and a warning against alcohol abuse. A man who has too much to drink falls asleep on a bar room floor and has a vivid dream about riding a train, which is driven by the devil. When the man wakes up he renounces the drink.

"Down Bound Train" was released in December 1955 as the B Side of "No Money Down". The title is sometimes given as "The Down Bound Train" or "Downbound Train."

It is one of the first rock records to employ fade-in and fade-out. Negativland performed and recorded "Hellbound Plane" in concert; it is a parody of "Downbound Train" and suggested fictional character Dick Vaughn had died in a plane crash.

== Cover versions ==
David Clayton-Thomas included a cover on his 1972 album Tequila Sunrise. In 2020, Vika and Linda cover the song for their album, Sunday (The Gospel According to Iso). Covered by George Thorogood and the Destroyers, and renamed Hellbound Train, on their 1999 album Half a Boy/Half a Man.
