= Young Boy =

1997 single by Paul McCartney

Single by Paul McCartney

from the album Flaming Pie
- B-side: "Looking for You"; "Broomstick"
- Released: 28 April 1997
- Recorded: 22 February 1995
- Studio: Steve Miller's home studio (Sun Valley, Idaho)
- Length: 3:54
- Label: Parlophone; MPL
- Songwriter: Paul McCartney
- Producer: Paul McCartney

Paul McCartney singles chronology
"Come Together" (1995)	"Young Boy" (1997)	"The World Tonight" (1997)

Music video
- "Young Boy" on YouTube

Flaming Pie track listing
- 14 tracks: 1. "The Song We Were Singing"; 2. "The World Tonight"; 3. "If You Wanna"; 4. "Somedays"; 5. "Young Boy"; 6. "Calico Skies"; 7. "Flaming Pie"; 8. "Heaven on a Sunday"; 9. "Used to Be Bad"; 10. "Souvenir"; 11. "Little Willow"; 12. "Really Love You"; 13. "Beautiful Night"; 14. "Great Day"

"Young Boy" is a song by English musician Paul McCartney, included as the fifth track on his 10th solo studio album, Flaming Pie (1997). McCartney reportedly started working on the song in August 1994. The initial tracks were recorded in February 1995 at Steve Miller's studio in Sun Valley, Idaho, and were completed in May at McCartney's home studio.

On 28 April 1997, the song was released as the first single from Flaming Pie, peaking at No. 3 in Spain and No. 19 on the UK Singles Chart. The single featured two non-album B-sides: "Looking for You" and "Broomstick". In the United States, Capitol Records chose to issue "The World Tonight" as the album's lead single instead.

== Track listings ==
UK CD1 and Australian CD single

1. "Young Boy" (with Steve Miller) – 3:54
2. "Looking for You" (with Ringo Starr and Jeff Lynne) – 4:38
3. "Oobu Joobu" (Part 1) – 9:54

UK CD2

1. "Young Boy" (with Steve Miller) – 3:54
2. "Broomstick" (with Steve Miller) – 5:09
3. "Oobu Joobu" (Part 2) – 10:19

Japanese CD single

1. "Young Boy" (with Steve Miller) – 3:55
2. "Looking for You" (with Ringo Starr and Jeff Lynne) – 4:38

=== "Oobu Joobu" ===
The "Oobu Joobu" tracks are a series of home demos, interviews, and unreleased songs jumbled together into one track. The name is taken from McCartney's Radio program, Oobu Joobu.

- "Oobu Joobu" (Part 1) contains:
1. "Some Folks Say Oobu" – 0:25
2. "Oobu Joobu Main Theme" – 0:30
3. Fun Packed Radio Show – 0:08
4. "I Love This House" – 3:41
5. "Clock Work" – 0:04
6. Paul talks about "Young Boy" – 3:47
7. "Oobu Joobu We Love You" – 0:12
8. "Oobu Joobu Main Theme" – 1:06
- "Oobu Joobu" (Part 2) contains:
1. Wide Screen Radio – 0:12
2. "Oobu Joobu We Love You" – 0:06
3. "Oobu Joobu Main Theme" – 0:32
4. Brilliant, What's Next – 0:03
5. "Atlantic Ocean" – 6:25
6. Paul Reminisces – 1:24
7. "Bouree" – 0:23
8. "Oobu Joobu We Love You" – 0:12
9. "Oobu Joobu Main Theme" – 1:03

== Personnel ==
- Paul McCartney – lead vocals, bass guitar, acoustic guitar, hammond organ, drums
- Steve Miller – backing vocals, electric guitar, rhythm guitar

== Charts ==
=== Weekly charts ===
Chart (1997)	Peak position
Australia (ARIA)	60
Austria (Ö3 Austria Top 40)	30
Belgium (Ultratip Bubbling Under Flanders)	11
Canada Top Singles (RPM)	28
Canada Adult Contemporary (RPM)	22
Europe (Eurochart Hot 100)	53
Germany (GfK)	55
Iceland (Íslenski Listinn Topp 40)	35
Italy Airplay (Music & Media)	9
Netherlands (Single Top 100)	53
Norway (VG-lista)	19
Scottish Singles Sales (Official Charts)	19
Spain (AFYVE)	3
Sweden (Sverigetopplistan)	41
UK Singles (Official Charts)	19

=== Year-end charts ===
Chart (1997)	Position
Canada Adult Contemporary (RPM)	85

== Release history ==
Region	Date	Format(s)	Label(s)	Ref.
Europe	8 April 1997	Radio	Parlophone; MPL	
United Kingdom	28 April 1997	7-inch vinyl; CD	Parlophone; MPL	
Japan	21 May 1997	CD	Parlophone	
