= Beautiful Night (Paul McCartney song) =

1997 single by Paul McCartney

- CD5 single

Single by Paul McCartney

from the album Flaming Pie
- B-side: "Love Come Tumbling Down" (7" only); "Same Love" (CD only)
- Released: 15 December 1997
- Recorded: 13 May 1996
- Studio: Hog Hill Mill (Icklesham, UK); Abbey Road (London)
- Genre: Rock
- Length: 5:03
- Label: EMI, Parlophone
- Songwriter: Paul McCartney
- Producers: Paul McCartney; Jeff Lynne

Paul McCartney singles chronology
"The World Tonight" (1997)	"Beautiful Night" (1997)	"Rushes" (1998)

Flaming Pie track listing
- 14 tracks: 1. "The Song We Were Singing"; 2. "The World Tonight"; 3. "If You Wanna"; 4. "Somedays"; 5. "Young Boy"; 6. "Calico Skies"; 7. "Flaming Pie"; 8. "Heaven on a Sunday"; 9. "Used to Be Bad"; 10. "Souvenir"; 11. "Little Willow"; 12. "Really Love You"; 13. "Beautiful Night"; 14. "Great Day"

Music video
- ”Beautiful Night” on YouTube

"Beautiful Night" is a song by Paul McCartney and is the 13th track on his 1997 album Flaming Pie. In December 1997, it was released as the third and final single from that album, peaking at number 25 in the UK Singles Chart. The single featured "Love Come Tumbling Down" and "Same Love" as b-sides, both of which were previously unreleased tracks and were recorded in 1987 and 1988 respectively.

== Background ==
The song was originally recorded in August 1986 in New York City. That version can be heard on the CD single as part of the "Oobu Joobu" section. McCartney recalled, "I had this song 'Beautiful Night', which I'd written quite a few years ago. I’d always liked it but I felt I didn't quite have the right version of it". The 1986 version was officially released as a stand-alone track in 2020 as a free download on McCartney's website.

The song is the first of three collaborations McCartney recorded with Ringo Starr during Flaming Pie sessions and features an orchestration by George Martin, recorded at Abbey Road Studios. Starr's inclusion was a suggestion by McCartney's producer, Jeff Lynne. McCartney explained, "I'd been saying to Ringo for years that it'd be great to do something, because we’d never really done that much work together outside the Beatles. One night Jeff Lynne suggested, 'Why don't you get Ringo in?' and I said, 'OK!' It just sort of happened". Starr, meanwhile, recalled, "He invited me to play on 'Beautiful Night' and I said 'Sure'. I think it's a beautiful track".

This version included a new, uptempo coda featuring vocals by Starr, as well as snippets of studio chatter from Starr. Upon completing the track, McCartney, Starr, and Lynne jammed, resulting in another track for Flaming Pie, "Really Love You".

== Critical reception ==
A reviewer from Music Week gave "Beautiful Night" four out of five, stating that "this epic single stands as McCartney's best ballad since Only Love Remains and is a testament to his recaptured form on Flaming Pie." The magazine's Alan Jones wrote, "Thus far, much of the attention surrounding the new Paul McCartney single Beautiful Night has centred on how lavish and controversial the video is. But it's a vintage piece of McCartney, quite literally since it's an old song dusted down and renovated with an impeccable George Martin score and one of Macca's best vocals in a good while, with extra Beatley support coming from Ringo Starr and surrogate Beatle Jeff Lynne." Claudia Connell from News of the World said that "Macca serves up his best work for years. With Ringo Starr on drums and George Martin producing, it is little wonder that it sounds so much like the Fab Four."

== Music video ==
The video accompanying the single was directed by Julien Temple and had to be re-edited as a brief glimpse of a woman skinnydipping caused a minor controversy. Also appearing in the video were Ringo Starr, Linda McCartney (her final appearance in a music video) and the band Spud (although they are shown performing with McCartney, they did not contribute to the recording of the track). The video debuted during an appearance on The Oprah Winfrey Show.

== Track listings ==
- 7" R6489, CD1 CDRS6489
1. "Beautiful Night" – 5:03
2. "Love Come Tumbling Down" – 4:21
3. "Oobu Joobu" (Part 5) – 10:15 (CD only)
- CD2 CDR6489
1. "Beautiful Night" – 5:08
2. "Same Love" – 3:53
3. "Oobu Joobu" (Part 6) – 8:33

=== Oobu Joobu information ===
The "Oobu Joobu" songs are a series of demos, interviews, and unreleased songs jumbled together into one track. The name is taken from McCartney's radio program, Oobu Joobu.

- "Oobu Joobu" (Part 5) contains:
1. "And Now" – 0:10
2. "Oobu Joobu Main Theme" – 1:14
3. Beautiful Night Chat – 0:09
4. Paul and Ringo talk about "Beautiful Night" – 2:06
5. Ringo Chat – 0:09
6. "Beautiful Night (Flaming Pie Mix)" – 1:31
7. "Beautiful Night (Original Version)" – 4:02
8. Goodbyes – 0:17
9. "Oobu Joobu Main Theme" – 0:37
- "Oobu Joobu" (Part 6) contains:
1. "This One" (jingle) – 0:08
2. "Oobu Joobu Main Theme" – 0:32
3. "Oobu Joobu We Love You" – 0:15
4. Paul talks about Abbey Road – 0:43
5. "Strawberry Fields Forever" (Paul solo) – 0:14
6. Paul talks about Abbey Road – 1:31
7. "Come on Baby" – 0:54
8. Paul talks about Abbey Road – 0:18
9. "Come on Baby (contd.)" – 0:33
10. Paul ends chat about Abbey Road – 0:22
11. "Okay are You Ready" (jingle) – 0:10
12. "Love Mix" – 3:02
13. "Widescreen Radio" (jingle) – 0:05
14. Goodbye – 0:18
15. "Oobu Joobu Main Theme" – 0:48

== Personnel ==
- Paul McCartney – Lead vocals and backing vocals, acoustic guitar, electric guitar, bass guitar, piano, Wurlitzer electric piano, hammond organ, additional percussion
- Linda McCartney – backing vocals
- Jeff Lynne – backing vocals, acoustic guitar, electric guitar
- Ringo Starr – backing and lead vocals, drums, percussion
- George Martin – orchestral arrangement
- David Snell – conductor
- Geoff Emerick – orchestral sessions audio engineer
- Jon Jacobs – orchestral sessions engineer
- Peter Cabbin – orchestral sessions engineer
- Paul Hicks – orchestral sessions engineer
- Susan Milan – flute

== Charts ==
Chart (1997)	Peak position
UK Singles (OCC)	25
