= Fool's Gold (disambiguation) =

Fool's Gold, or pyrite, is a mineral with a superficial resemblance to gold.

Fool's Gold may also refer to:

== Film and television ==
- Fool's Gold (1919 film), a silent drama film
- Fool's Gold (1947 film), a Hopalong Cassidy film
- Fool's Gold (1999 film), a film featuring Camryn Manheim
- Fool's Gold (2005 film), a comedy starring James Franco
- Fool's Gold (2006 film), a short film starring Holly Dignard
- Fool's Gold (2008 film), a romantic comedy/adventure starring Kate Hudson and Matthew McConaughey
- Fool's Gold (TV series), a reality-TV show on Discovery Channel Canada (airs in the U.S. on Animal Planet)
- "Fool's Gold" (American Dragon: Jake Long), an episode of American Dragon: Jake Long
- "Fool's Gold" (Ben 10: Alien Force), an episode of Ben 10: Alien Force
- "Fool's Gold" (Goof Troop), an episode of Goof Troop
- "Fool's Gold", a season 2 episode of The Casagrandes

== Literature ==
- Fool's Gold (comics), an OEL manga published by Tokyopop
- Fool's Gold, a 1958 novel by Dolores Hitchens
- Fool's Gold, a 1993 novel by Zilpha Keatley Snyder
- "Fool's Gold", a short story by Elizabeth Moon in the 1999 anthology Chicks 'n Chained Males
- Fool's Gold, a 2002–2005 fantasy trilogy by Jude Fisher
- Fool's Gold, a series of romance novels by Susan Mallery
- Fool's Gold: How Unrestrained Greed Corrupted a Dream, Shattered Global Markets and Unleashed a Catastrophe, a non-fiction book by Gillian Tett
- Star Trek: Deep Space Nine – Fool's Gold, a Star Trek four-issue comic book limited series published by IDW Publishing (December 2009–March 2010)

== Music ==
- Fool's Gold (band), a Los Angeles, California-based band
- Fool's Gold Records, an American record label

=== Albums ===
- Fools Gold (Christopher album), 2025
- Fool's Gold (Fool's Gold album), 2009
- Fool's Gold (Jill Barber album), 2014
- Fool's Gold, by Big B, 2013

=== Songs ===
- "Fools Gold" (The Stone Roses song), 1989
- "Fool's Gold" (Aaron Carter song), 2016
- "Fool's Gold" (Jack River song), 2017
- "Fool's Gold" (Lee Greenwood song), 1984
- "Fool's Gold", by Blackmore's Night from Under a Violet Moon
- "Fool's Gold", by One Direction from Four
- "Fools Gold", by Fitz and The Tantrums from More Than Just a Dream
- "Fool's Gold", by Passenger from Young as the Morning, Old as the Sea
- "Fool's Gold", by Petra from Back to the Street
- "Fools Gold", by Poco from Crazy Eyes
- "Fool's Gold", by Procol Harum from Procol's Ninth
- "Fools Gold", by Thin Lizzy from Johnny the Fox
- "Fools Gold", by Zion I from Mind Over Matter

== See also ==
- Fool's Gold Loaf, a sandwich popularized by Elvis Presley
