= No Money Down (Chuck Berry song) =

Single by Chuck Berry

from the album After School Session
- B-side: "Down Bound Train"
- Released: January 1956
- Recorded: December 1955
- Studio: Universal Recording Corp. (Chicago)
- Genre: Rock and roll
- Label: Chess 1615
- Songwriter: Chuck Berry

Chuck Berry singles chronology
"Thirty Days" (1955)	"No Money Down" (1956)	"Roll Over Beethoven" (1956)

"No Money Down" is a song written and recorded by Chuck Berry in December 1955. The recording session at Universal Recording Corporation was organized by Chess Records following the success of "Maybellene" and "Wee Wee Hours" singles the same year. "No Money Down" was first released as a single in January 1956, with "Down Bound Train" on the B-side, reaching number 8 in the Billboard R&B chart. The song was later included into Chuck Berry's 1957 album After School Session.

"No Money Down" features a repeating stop-time riff similar to the one that had previously appeared in Willie Dixon's "Hoochie Coochie Man", Bo Diddley's "I'm a Man" and Muddy Waters's "Mannish Boy". It tells a story of a man who enters a Cadillac showroom to trade in his Ford.
