= Run Devil Run (album) =

Studio album by Paul McCartney
- Released: 4 October 1999
- Recorded: 1–5 March and 4–5 May 1999
- Studios: Abbey Road, London
- Genre: Rock and roll
- Length: 40:46
- Label: Parlophone
- Producers: Chris Thomas; Paul McCartney

Paul McCartney chronology
Rushes (1998)	Run Devil Run (1999)	Working Classical (1999)

Paul McCartney studio album chronology
Flaming Pie (1997)	Run Devil Run (1999)	Driving Rain (2001)

Singles from Run Devil Run
- 1. "No Other Baby" Released: 24 October 1999 (UK)

Run Devil Run is the twelfth solo studio album by the English musician Paul McCartney, released in 1999. It features mostly covers of both familiar and obscure 1950s rock and roll songs, along with three original McCartney compositions written in the same style, making it his second covers album after CHOBA B CCCP. As his first project following first wife Linda's death in 1998, McCartney felt the need to get back to his roots and perform some of the music he loved as a teenager. On 14 December 1999, McCartney returned to the Cavern Club where he used to play in the early days with the Beatles, to perform the album almost in its entirety.

== Background ==
Following the death of his wife Linda McCartney in April 1998, Paul McCartney had a year of mourning. Wanting to keep things fresh, a lesson he had learned from his experiences working on The Beatles Anthology project and put to use on Flaming Pie, McCartney planned to cut the album as quickly as possible, much in the way the Beatles had recorded in their early years. Asking Chris Thomas to help produce, (Note: McCartney and Thomas previously worked together when McCartney was in The Beatles working on The Beatles (1968) when Thomas was an engineer, and when the pair co-produced Wings' Back to the Egg (1979) album.) McCartney booked time at Abbey Road Studios to undertake his quest.

== Music and lyrics ==
The album consists of 12 cover versions of rock and roll songs and three McCartney originals.

Of the covers, "Blue Jean Bop" was written and recorded by Gene Vincent in 1956. "She Said Yeah" had been recorded by Larry Williams. "All Shook Up", "I Got Stung" and "Party" had been recorded by Elvis Presley. "No Other Baby" was written by Dickie Bishop and Bob Watson, and was originally recorded in 1958 by skiffle group the Vipers (Note: The 1958 version had been produced by George Martin, who produced the Beatles' albums. McCartney had previously recorded the song during the Choba B CCCP (1988) sessions.) and released as a single. Despite never owning a copy of the song, it had made a big enough imprint on McCartney for him to record it 40 years on. "Lonesome Town" had been recorded by Ricky Nelson. "Movie Magg" had been recorded by Carl Perkins. Chuck Berry's composition "Brown Eyed Handsome Man" had been recorded by him and by Buddy Holly whose version McCartney liked. "Shake a Hand" was written by Joe Morris and recorded by Little Richard in 1956. "Coquette" had been recorded by Fats Domino. "Honey Hush" had been first recorded by Joe Turner, though the liner notes state that McCartney was more familiar with the version by Johnny Burnette.

Of the originals "Run Devil Run" is a song in the Chuck Berry style, "Try Not to Cry" was recounting a widower's suffering, and "What It Is" had been started a few months prior to Linda's death.

== Recording and structure ==
He wasn't thinking it was going to be the next big record. He was just free to enjoy himself.

— Chris Thomas, on the recording sessions

Wanting to work with reliable and empathetic musicians, McCartney called up Pink Floyd's David Gilmour to play guitar. (Note: Gilmour had worked with McCartney as early as The Dark Side of the Moon (1973) sessions where McCartney recorded some voice-overs which were not used; Gilmour later worked with McCartney on songs which ended up on the Back to the Egg (1979), Give My Regards to Broad Street (1984) and Flowers in the Dirt (1989) albums.) Also recruited were guitarist Mick Green, (Note: Green previously played on McCartney's Снова в СССР album.) keyboardists Pete Wingfield and Geraint Watkins, and on drums Deep Purple's Ian Paice and Dave Mattacks. McCartney played bass, and overdubbed electric or acoustic guitar or percussion on some songs.

McCartney wanted the sessions to be laid back, with no post-production. McCartney had brought a list of material that he wished to play, the songs being early rock and roll songs from his childhood and a few originals he had written in a similar style.

The initial sessions were a week in early March, with a few more sessions done in May, and then the album—featuring three new McCartney songs among the old classics—was complete.

Thomas thought it a "cathartic" exercise for McCartney, calling it the "this is for Linda album".

== Release ==
Released on 4 October 1999 in the UK, and a day later in the US, reaching number 12 in the UK and number 27 in the US.

The title Run Devil Run was inspired by Miller's Rexall Drugs, a hoodoo and herbal medicine shop in South Downtown Atlanta with products by that very name. It appealed to McCartney as a great title for a rock and roll song, which he duly composed. The store was located at 87 Broad Street in Atlanta, Georgia.

To stimulate sales, a number of different bonus discs and singles were issued to accompany the album. Two special editions of Run Devil Run with limited-edition bonus discs were available only at certain retailers. A special limited edition of the album, sold only at Best Buy, featured a bonus interview disc. A similar special limited edition of the album, sold only at Musicland and Sam Goody stores, featured a four-track E.P. that contained the original artists' versions of four songs on the album: "Blue Jean Bop" by Gene Vincent & His Blue Caps, "Lonesome Town" by Ricky Nelson, "Coquette" by Fats Domino, and "Let's Have a Party" by Wanda Jackson. Also, in the UK, all fifteen songs on the album, along with "Fabulous", were released on 25 December 1999, as set of eight 7-inch singles sold together in a Run Devil Run Limited Edition Collector's Box designed to look like a record case from the 1950s.

"No Other Baby" was released as a 7" vinyl single in the UK with two songs on the B-side, "Brown Eyed Handsome Man" and a non-album track "Fabulous". In America, "No Other Baby" was released on a special juke-box single, with "Try Not to Cry" included as the B-side. "No Other Baby", "Brown Eyed Handsome Man" and "Fabulous" were released together on two different CD singles, one of which contained stereo versions of the three songs and the other of which contained mono versions of the three songs. The music video for "No Other Baby", which was filmed in black and white, highlights McCartney's grief after Linda's death.

McCartney filmed a performance at the Cavern Club as part of promotion for the album, on 14 December 1999. This performance was eventually released as a video Live at the Cavern Club.

== Reception ==
Professional ratings
Review scores
Source	Rating
AllMusic	4/5 stars
Blender	4/5 stars
The Encyclopedia of Popular Music	4/5 stars
Entertainment Weekly	A−
The Essential Rock Discography	7/10
The Guardian	2/5 stars
Q	3/5 stars
Rolling Stone	3.5/5 stars
USA Today	3.5/4 stars
The Village Voice	A−

On release, Run Devil Run received several highly favourable reviews. McCartney biographer Peter Ames Carlin said that despite the rock and roll songs being written by others, the album was "the most deeply autobiographical album of Paul's career". Rhapsody praised the work, calling it one of their favourite cover albums.

== Track listing ==
No.	Title	Writer(s)	Length
1.	"Blue Jean Bop"	Gene Vincent, Hal Levy	1:57
2.	"She Said Yeah"	Roddy Jackson, Sonny Bono [as 'Don Christy']	2:07
3.	"All Shook Up"	Otis Blackwell, Elvis Presley	2:06
4.	"Run Devil Run"	Paul McCartney	2:36
5.	"No Other Baby"	Dickie Bishop, Bob Watson	4:18
6.	"Lonesome Town"	Baker Knight	3:30
7.	"Try Not to Cry"	McCartney	2:41
8.	"Movie Magg"	Carl Perkins	2:12
9.	"Brown Eyed Handsome Man"	Chuck Berry	2:27
10.	"What It Is"	McCartney	2:23
11.	"Coquette"	Johnny Green, Carmen Lombardo, Gus Kahn	2:43
12.	"I Got Stung"	David Hill, Aaron Schroeder	2:40
13.	"Honey Hush"	Joe Turner	2:36
14.	"Shake a Hand"	Joe Morris	3:52
15.	"Party"	Jessie Mae Robinson	2:38

Bonus track
No.	Title	Writer(s)	Length
16.	"Fabulous" (7" box set only)	Bernie Lowe, Kal Mann	2:16

Notes

- In 2007, upon adding McCartney's catalogue of music, the iTunes Store added his cover of the Charlie Gracie song, "Fabulous", as an exclusive digital bonus track on this album.
- "Fabulous" was also released as the B-side on the "No Other Baby" single.

== Personnel ==
Personnel per booklets.

- Paul McCartney – vocals (all), bass guitar (all), electric guitar (5, 9, 10, 11, 14, 16), percussion (7, 9), acoustic guitar (8)
- David Gilmour – electric guitar (all), backing vocals (3, 5, 6), lap steel guitar (4)
- Mick Green – electric guitar (all except 9, 10), Hi Strung electric guitar (9, 10)
- Pete Wingfield –piano (2, 4, 6, 9-12, 14-16), Hammond organ (5, 14), Wurlitzer electronic piano (13)
- Ian Paice – drums (all except 3, 7), percussion (8, 9)
- Dave Mattacks – drums (3, 7), percussion (6, 7)
- Geraint Watkins – piano (3, 7)
- Chris Hall – accordion (9)

Production

- Chris Thomas, Paul McCartney – producers
- Geoff Emerick, Paul Hicks – engineer
- Steve Rooke – mastering
- Dave Fine – cover photos
- Richard Haughton – Paul photo
- Mike McCartney – young Paul photo
- John Hammel – session photos
- Mike Owen – products photo
- Philip Gallard – instrument photos
- Klaus Voormann, Aleen Toroyan – drawings
- Norman Hathaway – design

== Charts ==
=== Weekly charts ===
Weekly chart performance for Run Devil Run
Chart (1999)	Peak position
Australian Albums (ARIA)	99
Austrian Albums (Ö3 Austria)	18
Belgian Albums (Ultratop Flanders)	44
Dutch Albums (Album Top 100)	53
French Albums (SNEP)	55
German Albums (Offizielle Top 100)	21
Japanese Albums (Oricon)	30
Norwegian Albums (VG-lista)	12
Swedish Albums (Sverigetopplistan)	23
Swiss Albums (Schweizer Hitparade)	36
UK Albums (OCC)	12
US Billboard 200	27

=== Year-end charts ===
Year-end chart performance for Run Devil Run
Chart (1999)	Position
UK Albums (OCC)	117

== Certifications and sales ==
Region	Certification	Certified units/sales
Japan (Oricon Charts)	—	14,870
United Kingdom (BPI)	Gold	105,332
