= The World Tonight (song) =

- CD5

Single by Paul McCartney

from the album Flaming Pie
- B-side: "Looking for You" (US CD); "Used to Be Bad" (UK 7" and CD1); "Really Love You" (UK CD2)
- Released: 17 April 1997 (US); 7 July 1997 (UK)
- Recorded: 13 November 1995
- Studio: Hog Hill Mill (Icklesham, UK)
- Genre: Rock
- Length: 4:03
- Label: EMI, Parlophone, Capitol
- Songwriter: Paul McCartney
- Producers: Paul McCartney; Jeff Lynne

Paul McCartney singles chronology
"Young Boy" (1997)	"The World Tonight" (1997)	"Beautiful Night" (1997)

Flaming Pie track listing
- 14 tracks: 1. "The Song We Were Singing"; 2. "The World Tonight"; 3. "If You Wanna"; 4. "Somedays"; 5. "Young Boy"; 6. "Calico Skies"; 7. "Flaming Pie"; 8. "Heaven on a Sunday"; 9. "Used to Be Bad"; 10. "Souvenir"; 11. "Little Willow"; 12. "Really Love You"; 13. "Beautiful Night"; 14. "Great Day"

"The World Tonight" is a song by Paul McCartney and is the second track on his 1997 album Flaming Pie. This song and Young Boy were featured in the 1997 movie Fathers' Day.

In the United States, the song was released as the first and only single from the album on 17 April 1997, peaking at number 64 on the Billboard Hot 100 and number 23 on the Billboard Modern Rock Tracks chart. The B-side for the American release was originally released in the UK as the B-side for "Young Boy" single and is an additional collaboration with Ringo Starr.

In the UK the song was released as the second single from Flaming Pie in July, peaking at #23 in the UK Singles Chart (see 1997 in British music). The B-sides for the British release are two songs from Flaming Pie: "Used to Be Bad" and "Really Love You".

== Critical reception ==
The NME's John Robinson wrote that it was an "entirely harmless MOR jangle".

== Track listings ==
All songs written by Paul McCartney, except where noted.

- US CD C2 7243 8 58650 2 2, released 6 May 1997 by Capitol Records.
1. "The World Tonight" – 4:03
2. "Looking for You" – 4:48
3. "Oobu Joobu" (Part 1) – 9:55
- UK 7" RP6472, UK CD1 CDRS6472
1. "The World Tonight" – 4:03
2. "Used to Be Bad" (Steve Miller, McCartney) – 4:08
3. "Oobu Joobu" (Part 3) – 9:48 CD only
- UK CD2 CDR6472
1. "The World Tonight" – 4:03
2. "Really Love You" (McCartney, Richard Starkey) – 5:14
3. "Oobu Joobu" (Part 4) – 7:06

=== Oobu Joobu information ===
The "Oobu Joobu" songs are a series of demos, interviews, and unreleased songs jumbled together into one track. The name is taken from McCartney's radio program.

- "Oobu Joobu" (part 3) contains:
1. Intro chat – 0:09
2. "Oobu Joobu Main Theme" – 0:48
3. "Squid" – 6:25
4. Paul talks about "The World Tonight" – 1:23
5. Link – 0:05
6. "Oobu Joobu Main Theme" – 0:59
- "Oobu Joobu" (part 4) contains:
1. Intro chat – 0:06
2. "Oobu Joobu Main Theme" – 0:37
3. Link – 0:18
4. "Don't Break the Promise" – 3:39
5. Paul talks about reggae – 1:25
6. Link – 0:04
7. "Oobu Joobu Main Theme" – 0:57

== Charts ==
=== Weekly charts ===
Chart (1997)	Peak position
Canada RPM Adult Contemporary	19
Canada RPM Top Singles	14
Netherlands (Single Top 100)	68
UK Singles (Official Charts)	23
US Billboard Hot 100	64
US Adult Alternative Airplay (Billboard)	9
US Mainstream Rock (Billboard)	23

=== Year-end charts ===
Chart (1997)	Position
Canada Top Singles (RPM)	83

== Personnel ==
- Paul McCartney – lead and harmony vocals, bass guitar, acoustic and electric guitars, piano, drums, percussion
- Jeff Lynne – harmony vocals, electric guitar, acoustic guitar, keyboards
