= Brown Eyed Handsome Man =

1956 single by Chuck Berry

Single by Chuck Berry

from the album After School Session
- A-side: "Too Much Monkey Business"
- Released: September 1956
- Recorded: April 16, 1956
- Studio: Universal Recording Corp. (Chicago)
- Genre: Rock and roll, rhythm and blues
- Length: 2:19
- Label: Chess 1635
- Songwriter: Chuck Berry
- Producers: Leonard Chess, Phil Chess

Chuck Berry singles chronology
"Maybellene" (1955)	"Brown Eyed Handsome Man" (1956)	"Roll Over Beethoven" (1956)

"Brown Eyed Handsome Man"

Single by Buddy Holly

from the album Reminiscing
- B-side: "Rock-a-Bye Rock"
- Released: 1963
- Recorded: 1957
- Genre: Rock and roll
- Length: 2:07
- Label: Coral 93 352
- Songwriter: Chuck Berry
- Producer: Norman Petty

Buddy Holly singles chronology
"Reminiscing" (1962)	"Brown Eyed Handsome Man" (1963)	"Bo Diddley" (1963)

"Brown Eyed Handsome Man" is a rock and roll song written and recorded by Chuck Berry, originally released by Chess Records in September 1956 as the B-side of "Too Much Monkey Business." It was also included on Berry's 1957 debut album, After School Session. The song title was also used as the title of a biography of Berry.

== Background and recording ==
"Brown Eyed Handsome Man" was written after Berry visited several African-American and Hispanic areas in California. During his time there, he saw a Hispanic man being arrested by a policeman when "some woman came up shouting for the policeman to let him go."

"Brown Eyed Handsome Man" was recorded at Universal Recording Corporation in Chicago, Illinois on April 16, 1956. The session was produced by the Chess brothers, Leonard and Phil. Backing Berry were Johnnie Johnson on piano, L. C. Davis on tenor saxophone, Willie Dixon on bass, and Fred Below on drums.

The song was released in September 1956 and reached number 5 on Billboard magazine's R&B Singles chart later that year.

== Relevance in race relations ==
Glenn C. Altschuler, in a caption to photo of Berry, states that the lyrics of the song "played slyly with racial attitudes and even fears." Martha Bayles noted that "Berry's penchant for bragging about his 'Brown Eyed Handsome Man''s appeal for white females outraged a lot of people."

== Cover versions ==
The song has been covered by many artists, including Buddy Holly, whose recording was a posthumous hit in the United Kingdom in 1963, where it peaked at number three, and was released on the album Reminiscing, which reached number two on the UK Albums Chart. Holly's version also peaked at number three in Ireland. Wanda Jackson covered the song in her 1961 album Right or Wrong. Johnny Rivers also covered the song on his first album, At the Whisky à Go Go, in 1964, as did Nina Simone on her 1967 album High Priestess of Soul and Waylon Jennings on a single from his 1970 album Waylon. It was also covered by Robert Cray on the 1987 live tribute album to Berry, Hail! Hail! Rock 'n' Roll and by Paul McCartney on his 1999 album Run Devil Run and on a double A-side single with "No Other Baby".

The song was also performed by the so-called "Million Dollar Quartet": Johnny Cash, Carl Perkins, Jerry Lee Lewis, and Elvis Presley in a jam session on December 4, 1956. Lewis also released a solo version on his 1970 album She Even Woke Me Up to Say Goodbye. Cash recorded it with Perkins on his posthumous 2003 album Unearthed. "Brown Eyed Handsome Man" was performed in the Broadway musical Million Dollar Quartet, which opened in New York in April 2010, and was included in the album Million Dollar Quartet, recorded by the original Broadway cast, with Lance Guest as Johnny Cash, Robert Britton Lyons as Carl Perkins, Levi Kreis as Jerry Lee Lewis, and Eddie Clendening as Elvis Presley.

It was also covered by Lyle Lovett on his 2012 album Release Me.

The song is referenced in John Fogerty’s song "Centerfield" with the line, “A-roundin' third, and headed for home, It's a brown-eyed handsome man.”
