= Too Much Monkey Business =

Single by Chuck Berry

from the album After School Session
- B-side: "Brown Eyed Handsome Man"
- Released: September 1956
- Recorded: April 16, 1956
- Studio: Universal Recording Corp. (Chicago)
- Genre: Rock and roll, rhythm and blues
- Length: 2:56
- Label: Chess (1635)
- Songwriter: Chuck Berry
- Producers: Leonard Chess, Phil Chess

Chuck Berry singles chronology
"Roll Over Beethoven" (1956)	"Too Much Monkey Business" (1956)	"You Can't Catch Me" (1956)

"Too Much Monkey Business" is a song written and recorded by Chuck Berry, released by Chess Records in September 1956 as his fifth single. It was also released as the third track on his first solo LP, After School Session, in May 1957; and as an EP. The single reached number four on Billboard magazine's Most Played R&B In Juke Boxes chart, number 11 on the Most Played R&B by Jockeys chart and number seven on the R&B Top Sellers in Stores chart in the fall of 1956.

== Recording ==
"Too Much Monkey Business" was recorded at Universal Recording Corporation in Chicago, Illinois on April 16, 1956. The session was produced by Leonard Chess and Phil Chess. Backing Berry were Johnnie Johnson (piano), Willie Dixon (double bass), and Fred Below (drums).

== Cover versions ==
Elvis Presley recorded a cover of the song during a warm-up at the sessions for Stay Away, Joe and later released the song on Elvis Sings Flaming Star in 1969.

Several British Invasion bands recorded cover versions of "Too Much Monkey Business". The Beatles recorded their version on September 3, 1963, with John Lennon on vocals; it aired on the BBC Light Programme Pop Go the Beatles on September 10. This recording was released on the album Live at the BBC in 1994. The Hollies recorded the song for their second album, In The Hollies Style, in November 1964. The Yardbirds with Eric Clapton used the song to open up their performance at the Marquee Club, which was released on Five Live Yardbirds. The Kinks recorded their version for their self-titled debut album in 1964; it was one of two songs by Berry on the album, the other being "Beautiful Delilah". The Youngbloods released a version of the song on their 1967 album, Earth Music. Swedish group Shakers reached number 4 on Tio i Topp and number 10 on Kvällstoppen with their version in mid-1965.

== Influences on other songs ==
"Too Much Monkey Business" was an influence on Bob Dylan's "Subterranean Homesick Blues". The glam rocker Johnny Thunders paid tribute to Berry's song in "Too Much Junkie Business", a mix of "Pills" (by Bo Diddley) and Berry's "Too Much Monkey Business".

== See also ==
- Monkey Business (1952 film)
