= Peter Cobbin =

- Musical career
- Genres: Rock; pop; classical; film music
- Occupations: Audio engineer; producer; composer
- Years active: 1987–present

Peter Cobbin is an Australian audio engineer and producer. He served as chief engineer of Abbey Road Studios from 1995 to the mid-2010s, during which he became the first engineer to remix music by the Beatles, remixing their 1999 compilation album Yellow Submarine Songtrack. He has recorded and mixed scores for a number of films, including The Lord of the Rings: The Return of the King (2002), several entries in the Harry Potter and Wizarding World franchise, and the Hobbit trilogy (2012–14).

Prior to his tenure at Abbey Road, Cobbin worked as a mix specialist in Sydney, Australia, training at Studios 301. As Abbey Road's senior recording engineer, he helped rediscover and restore some of the company's vintage equipment for use in contemporary projects. Alongside fellow Abbey Road engineer Kirsty Whalley, Cobbin served as associate music director for the 2012 Summer Olympics opening ceremony. Cobbin and Whalley eventually left Abbey Road Studios and established their own audio mixing company, Such Sweet Thunder. Cobbin has continued to record and mix film scores with Whalley, with the duo working together on such Marvel Studios films as Avengers: Endgame and Spider-Man: Far From Home (both 2019).

Artists with whom Cobbin has worked include Air, Amy Winehouse, Annie Lennox, Bjork, Ed Sheeran, Emeli Sandé, Eurythmics, Florence and the Machine, Freddie Mercury, Janet Jackson, Luciano Pavarotti, Kanye West, Kate Bush, Paul McCartney, Mark Knopfler, Mick Jagger and The Basics.

== Career ==
=== Early career ===
Cobbin worked as mix specialist in his native city of Sydney, Australia, receiving training at Studios 301. He also worked as a tape op, assisting in recording sessions for such musicians as Bob Dylan, Duran Duran, Elton John, and Tom Petty.

=== At Abbey Road Studios ===
In 1995, Cobbin moved from Australia to London to work as senior recording engineer at Abbey Road Studios.

Coinciding with a re-release of the 1968 animated film Yellow Submarine, Cobbin was tasked with remixing songs by the Beatles to be included in a compilation album titled Yellow Submarine Songtrack. This involved creating a stereo mix for the film's soundtrack, which was originally in mono, and a 5.1 surround sound mix that could be shown in theaters and utilized for home video.

During his tenure at Abbey Road, Cobbin sought to highlight past equipment and technical innovations introduced by EMI, the company which owned the studio from 1931 to 2013, as a means of celebrating the company's heritage and benefiting contemporary projects. In partnership with the EMI archive trust, Cobbin helped rediscover and restore some of the company's older equipment for use in newer projects. This involved the removal of gear from storage, and led to the marketing of hardware and software recreations of vintage equipment used at Abbey Road, including compressors and limiters.

Cobbin recorded and mixed scores for films like The Lord of the Rings: The Return of the King (2003), several installments in the Harry Potter and Wizarding World franchise, and the Hobbit trilogy (2012–14). Alongside fellow Abbey Road engineer Kirsty Whalley, he served as associate music director for the 2012 Summer Olympics opening ceremony.

Cobbin was involved with the recording and mixing of the score for the 2010 film The King's Speech, which utilized old microphones made by EMI, including five made for King George V, one of which was also used by King George VI. According to Lester Smith, technical engineer and custodian of Abbey Road Studios' microphone collection, "There were actually five microphones, and Peter asked me to try and get them working. After being silent for 70 years, this was a very special opportunity to have a go."

=== Such Sweet Thunder ===
Cobbin and Whalley eventually left Abbey Road Studios and formed their own company, Such Sweet Thunder, which allows clients to utilize their Dolby Atmos mixing room in North London. Regarding the transition from Abbey Road to their own enterprise, Cobbin stated, "It was scary to make the move. Abbey Road was our safety net. The name sells itself and that was a big thing to let go. But it was also about us having a quiet ambition to do something great because for years we'd had very specific ideas about transforming our mix room and changing how we worked with our clients. The only way to pull all that together and do something positive was to step outside our comfort zone."

In 2019 Cobbin and Whalley recorded and mixed scores for such films as Spider-Man: Far From Home, Knives Out, Jojo Rabbit, Maleficent: Mistress of Evil, The Two Popes, and Little Women.
