= Paul McCartney's Liverpool Oratorio =

Live album by Paul McCartney and Carl Davis
- Released: 7 October 1991
- Recorded: 28–29 June 1991
- Venue: Liverpool Cathedral
- Genres: Classical, opera
- Length: 97:28
- Label: EMI Classics
- Producer: John Fraser

Paul McCartney chronology
Unplugged (The Official Bootleg) (1991)	Paul McCartney's Liverpool Oratorio (1991)	Off the Ground (1993)

Singles from Paul McCartney's Liverpool Oratorio
- 1. "The World You're Coming Into" Released: 20 September 1991; 2. "Save the Child" Released: 12 November 1991

Paul McCartney's Liverpool Oratorio is a live album by Paul McCartney and Carl Davis, released in 1991. It is McCartney's first major foray into classical music. Composed in collaboration with Carl Davis to commemorate the Royal Liverpool Philharmonic Orchestra's 150th anniversary, the project received media attention upon its unveiling in June 1991.

== Composition ==
McCartney and maestro Carl Davis started working on the music in 1988, after they met through mutual friends. During their first meeting, the two discussed some ideas and McCartney suggested the title, although initially it was called Requiem. Davis said to author Luca Perasi: "That idea that it would be only using classical instruments was Paul’s. When we began to talk about it, it would be a combination, but he didn’t want to do that. He wanted to keep it very pure." Davis tried to persuade McCartney to learn musical notation, but to no avail; sometimes, if he was in a receptive mood, he asked some questions about it, but he wrote the material leaning on his "primitive" approach. Davis also revealed that "The Drinking Song" [a section of Movement 6 of the Oratorio, called “Work”] was achieved in one hour.

== Recording ==
This recording was captured at the oratorio's dress rehearsal and premiere at Liverpool Cathedral with McCartney in attendance and features noted professional classical singers Kiri Te Kanawa, Jerry Hadley, Sally Burgess and Willard White performing the roles in the oratorio. The recording was engineered by John Timperley.

== Music and story ==
Consisting of eight movements, the story of the oratorio loosely follows McCartney's own lifeline, with the main character, Shanty, who is born in 1942 in Liverpool, raised to believe that "being born where you were born carries with it certain responsibilities". After his school days where he often "sagged off" (Liverpool slang for skipping class), Shanty begins working and meets his future bride, Mary Dee. Following the death of his father, Shanty and Mary Dee are married and are forced to deal with the rigours of balancing a happy marriage and their careers. Amid a quarrel, Mary Dee reveals that she is pregnant and after surviving a nearly fatal accident, gives birth to their son. Thus, the cycle of life in Liverpool carries on.

== Performance history ==
The piece has been performed in concert on several occasions following its 28 June 1991 premiere in Liverpool. The American premiere took place on 18 November 1991 at Carnegie Hall, and featured Carl Davis conducting the Liverpool Philharmonic and soloists Barbara Bonney, Sally Burgess, Jerry Hadley, and Willard White. On 24 October 1992, the work was presented at the Orange County Performing Arts Center under the baton of William Hall.

Maestro Davis conducted Norrköping Symphony Orchestra and Bonney reprised her solo in two Swedish performances in Linköping and Stockholm in March 1993 together with opera bass singer Lars Arvidson and choirs Linköping Oratoriekör and Chorus Lin from Linköping University.

Cincinnati Opera presented a fully-staged production of the oratorio in July 2024, directed by Caroline Clegg with the Cincinnati Symphony Orchestra conducted by Joseph Young.

== Reception ==
Professional ratings
Review scores
Source	Rating
AllMusic	2/5 stars
The Encyclopedia of Popular Music	3/5 stars
MusicHound	3/5 stars
The Rolling Stone Album Guide	2/5 stars

The commercial reaction for the work was strong, with the oratorio spending many weeks atop the classical charts worldwide, and even charting at number 177 in regular album chart in the US. Critical reaction was mixed. Allan Kozinn, reviewing the Liverpool premiere for The New York Times in June 1991, described the work as "a richly melodic, lavishly orchestrated piece about the loss and reclamation of innocence, love and faith." In particular, Kozinn noted "an exquisite soprano aria" and "a five-minute violin meditation that suggests Mr. McCartney could be a superb concerto composer." Some observed that the work, while attractive, was simplistic, overlong and, given its aspirations, insubstantial.

== Track listing ==
All pieces by Paul McCartney and Carl Davis. The first four movements are on CD disc one, the second four on disc two.

=== Disc one ===
==== Side one ====
Movement I – War

1. Andante (Orchestra) – 2:02
2. 'Non Nobis Solum' – 2:35
3. 'The Air Raid Siren Slices Through...' (Shanty) – 2:09
4. 'Oh Will It All End Here?' (Shanty) – 1:36
5. 'Mother and Father Holding Their Child' – 1:16

Movement II – School

6. 'We're Here in School Today to Get a Perfect Education' – 2:10
7. 'Walk in Single File Out of the Classroom' (Headmaster) – 1:02
8. 'Settle Down' – 0:40
9. 'Kept in Confusion' (Shanty) – 2:35
10. 'I'll Always Be Here' (Mary Dee) – 1:35
11. 'Boys, This Is Your Teacher' (Headmaster, Miss Inkley) – 1:23
12. 'Tres Conejos' (Miss Inkley, Headmaster, Shanty) – 1:50
13. 'Not for Ourselves' (Headmaster, Miss Inkley, Shanty) – 0:55

==== Side two ====
Movement III – Crypt

14. 'And So It Was That I Had Grown' (Shanty) – 0:48
15. Dance – 1:44
16. 'I Used to Come Here When This Place Was a Crypt' (Shanty, Preacher) – 1:58
17. 'Here Now' (Shanty) – 0:46
18. 'I'll Always Be Here' (Mary Dee, Shanty) – 2:24
19. 'Now's the Time to Tell Him' (Mary Dee, Shanty) – 2:21

Movement IV – Father

20. Andante Lamentoso – 2:59
21. 'O Father, You Have Given...' (Chief Mourner) – 1:05
22. '(Ah)' – 1:13
23. 'Hey, Wait a Minute' (Shanty) – 1:44
24. 'Father, Father, Father' (Shanty, Chief Mourner) – 4:12

=== Disc two ===
==== Side three ====
Movement V – Wedding

1. Andante Amoroso – 'I Know I Should Be Glad of This' (Shanty, Mary Dee) – 5:42
2. 'Father, Hear Our Humble Voices' (Preacher) – 1:13
3. 'Hosanna, Hosanna' (Mary Dee, Shanty) – 1:40

Movement VI – Work

4. Allegro Energico – 1:20
5. 'Working Women at the Top' (Mary Dee) – 2:52
6. Violin Solo – 5:05
7. 'Did I Sign the Letter...' (Mary Dee) – 1:34
8. Tempo I – 0:30
9. 'When You Ask a Working Man' (Shanty, Mr. Dingle) – 1:34
10. 'Let's Find Ourselves a Little Hostelry' (Mr. Dingle) – 2:04

==== Side four ====
Movement VII – Crises

11. Allegro Molto – 0:54
12. 'The World You're Coming Into' (Mary Dee) – 2:28
13. Tempo I – 0:45
14. 'Where's My Dinner?' (Shanty, Mary Dee) – 2:40
15. 'Let's Not Argue' (Shanty, Mary Dee) – 0:31
16. 'I'm Not a Slave' (Mary Dee, Shanty) – 0:52
17. 'Right! That's It!' (Mary Dee) – 0:49
18. 'Stop. Wait.' – 2:03
19. 'Do You Know Who You Are...' (Nurse) – 3:36
20. 'Ghosts of the Past Left Behind' (Nurse, Shanty, Mary Dee) – 3:08
21. 'Do We Live in a World...' (Mary Dee, Nurse, Shanty) – 3:18

Movement VIII – Peace

22. 'And So It Was That You Were Born' (Shanty) – 1:22
23. 'God Is Good' – 1:26
24. 'What People Want Is a Family Life' (Preacher) – 2:17
25. 'Dad's in the Garden' (Nurse, Mary Dee, Preacher, Shanty) – 3:13
26. 'So on and on the Story Goes' (Mary Dee, Shanty) – 1:06

== Personnel ==
- Royal Liverpool Philharmonic Orchestra – orchestra
- Royal Liverpool Philharmonic Choir – chorus
- Liverpool Cathedral Choiristers – chorus
- Carl Davis – conductor
- Ian Tracey – conductor
- Kiri Te Kanawa – soprano: Mary Dee
- Jerry Hadley – tenor: Shanty
- Sally Burgess – mezzo-soprano: Miss Inkley, Chief Mourner, Nurse
- Willard White – bass: Headmaster, Preacher, Mr. Dingle
- Jeremy Budd – treble: Boy soloist
