= The Song We Were Singing =

Song by Paul McCartney

from the album Flaming Pie
- Released: 5 May 1997
- Studio: Hogg Hill Mill, Icklesham
- Length: 3:54
- Label: Parlophone (UK); Capitol (US)
- Songwriter: McCartney
- Producers: McCartney; Jeff Lynne

"The Song We Were Singing" is a song by the English musician and former Beatle Paul McCartney, released as the opening track on his 1997 album Flaming Pie.

== Background and recording ==
McCartney wrote "The Song We Were Singing" in Jamaica in early January 1995. It was the first song on Flaming Pie, and McCartney and Jeff Lynne, who plays electric guitar, acoustic guitar, keyboard, and sings a harmony vocal, with McCartney performing everything else on the track. As McCartney stated on the writing of the song recorded at Hogg Hill Mill in Icklesham.

I was remembering the sixties; sitting around late at night dossing, smoking pipes, drinking wine... jawing, talking about the cosmic solution. It was what we were all doing... all that 'what about... wow!' It's that time in your life when you got a chance for all that.

— Paul McCartney, in Mark Lewisohn and Geoff Baker, Flaming Pie, Flaming Pie liner notes

McCartney wanted to use his original guitar and vocal demo as the basis for the final track similar to "Free as a Bird" and "Real Love", but very little of it was used on the final recording.

== Composition and lyrics ==
"The Song We Were Singing" is a waltz track in a style similar to the Beatles' "We Can Work It Out" and Rubber Soul, a 1965 album by the Beatles. According to author John Blaney: "For McCartney, 'The Song We Were SInging' was an evocation of times spent in the 1960s relaxing with friends. A nostalgic view of that swinging decade, when anything seemed possible, his lyric suggests that there was a longing for something more lasting than fame and wealth."

== Release and reception ==
Writing for Rolling Stone, Anthony DeCurtis writes it "suffers from the self-congratulation of that most cliched of genres, the boomer reminiscence". Paul Moody writes in an NME review that "Opening Dylan-pastiche 'The Song We Were Singing' jogs contentedly along the leafy byways of '60s Nostalgia Avenue". In a review for the Archive Collection reissue of the album, Jamie Atkins write that it "begins with Paul in campfire acoustic mode, the tone casual and conversational as he remembers putting the world to rights back in the 60s[ ]before a whopping great shanty of a chorus takes over, harmonium and all, bolstered with multi-track Beatlesy backing vocals". The track is included as the eighth track on the first disk of the compilation Pure McCartney.

== Credits and personnel ==
According to the liner notes of Flaming Pie:

Performers

- Paul McCartney – lead and harmony vocals, electric and acoustic guitar, bass guitar, double bass, drums, harmonium, producer
- Jeff Lynne – electric and acoustic guitar, keyboard, producer

Technical

- Geoff Emerick – engineer
- Jon Jacobs – engineer
- Keith Smith – assistant engineer
- Marc Mann – digital sequencing
