= Showmanship =

Showmanship may refer to:

- Showmanship (performing), the skill of performing in such a manner that will appeal to an audience or aid in conveying the performance's essential theme or message
- Dog showmanship, a set of skills and etiquette used by handlers of dogs in a dog competition
- Horse showmanship, an event found at many horse shows
- Guitar showmanship, gimmicks, jumps, or other stunts with a guitar

== See also ==
- Showman, having a variety of meanings, usually by context and depending on the country
