= Chuck Berry Live in Concert =

Live album by Chuck Berry
- Released: 1978
- Recorded: 13 September 1969
- Venue: Varsity Stadium, Toronto, Ontario, Canada
- Genre: Rock and roll
- Label: Magnum Records

Chuck Berry chronology
Chuck Berry (1975)	Chuck Berry Live in Concert (1978)	Rockit (1979)

Singles from Chuck Berry Live in Concert
- 1. "Johnny B. Goode" Released: 1979; 2. "School Days" Released: 1979; 3. "Rock and Roll Music" Released: 1979; 4. "Maybellene" Released: 1979; 5. "Sweet Little Sixteen" Released: 1979

Chuck Berry Live in Concert is a live album by Chuck Berry. It was released in 1978, nine years after it was recorded at the 1969 Rock and Roll Revival concert at Varsity Stadium in Toronto, Canada.

== Track listing ==
All tracks written by Chuck Berry except as noted:

1. "Rock and Roll Music" – 2:29
2. "Nadine" – 4:00
3. "School Days" – 3:26
4. "In the Wee Wee Hours (I Think of You)" – 5:20
5. "Hoochie Coochie Man" (Willie Dixon) – 8:29
6. "Medley: Johnny B. Goode/Carol/Promised Land" – 4:15
7. "Sweet Little Sixteen" – 2:45
8. "Memphis" – 4:11
9. "Too Much Monkey Business" – 2:50
10. "My Ding-a-Ling" (Dave Bartholomew) – 9:33
11. "Reelin' and Rockin'" – 6:11
12. "Johnny B. Goode" – 4:52
13. "Maybellene" – 3:24

== Personnel ==
- Chuck Berry – guitar, vocals
- Ron Marinelli – guitar
- Hughie Leggat – bass
- Danny Taylor – drums
