= Chuck Berry (album) =

Studio album by Chuck Berry
- Released: 1975
- Recorded: August 26–29, 1974; March 1, 1973 (A Deuce, Sue Answer)
- Studio: Sound Exchange; Technisonic, St. Louis, Missouri
- Genre: Rock, rock and roll
- Length: 37:55
- Label: Chess
- Producer: Esmond Edwards

Chuck Berry chronology
Bio (1973)	Chuck Berry (1975)	Chuck Berry Live in Concert (1978)

Singles from Chuck Berry
- 1. "Shake, Rattle and Roll" Released: 1975

Professional ratings
Review scores
Source	Rating
AllMusic	3/5 stars
Christgau's Record Guide	B−

Chuck Berry is the eighteenth studio album by Chuck Berry, released in 1975 by Chess Records. Some pressings of this album carry the title Chuck Berry '75. Berry's daughter, Ingrid, contributed backing vocals.

This was Berry's final new album release for Chess Records, ending his off-and-on association with the label dating back 21 years. He moved to Atco Records, for which he recorded his next studio album, Rockit, in 1979.

== Track listing ==
1. "Swanee River“ (Stephen Foster; adapted and arranged by Chuck Berry) – 2:38
2. "I'm Just a Name“ (Berry) – 3:37
3. "I Just Want to Make Love to You“ (Willie Dixon) – 3:05
4. "Too Late“ (Berry) – 2:45
5. "South of the Border“ (Jimmy Kennedy, Michael Carr) – 2:22
6. "Hi Heel Sneakers“ (Robert Higgenbotham) – 4:40
7. "You Are My Sunshine“ (Charles Mitchell, Jimmie Davis) – 2:50
8. "My Babe“ (Walter Jacobs) – 2:28
9. "Baby What You Want Me to Do“ (Jimmy Reed) – 2:34
10. "A Deuce“ (Berry) – 2:31
11. "Shake, Rattle and Roll“ (Charles E. Calhoun) – 2:15
12. "Sue Answer“ (Berry) – 2:25
13. "Don't You Lie to Me“ (Berry) – 3:45

== Personnel ==
Musicians

- Chuck Berry – guitar, piano, vocals
- Billy Peek – guitar (tracks 10, 12)
- Elliot Randall – guitar (except tracks 9, 10, 12)
- Wilbur Bascomb – bass
- Greg Edick – bass (tracks 10, 12)
- Ernie Hayes – piano
- Jimmy Johnson, Jr. – drums
- Ron Reed – drums (tracks 10, 12)
- Earl Williams – drums (tracks 2, 4)
- Ingrid Berry Gibson – vocals (tracks 2, 4, 9)

Technical

- Esmond Edwards – producer
- Bob Scerbo – production supervision
- Neil Terk – art direction
