= Bio (album) =

Studio album by Chuck Berry
- Released: August 1973
- Recorded: March – May 1973
- Studio: Sound Exchange, New York City; Technisonic, St. Louis, Missouri
- Genre: Rock and roll
- Length: 32:38
- Label: Chess
- Producer: Esmond Edwards

Chuck Berry chronology
The London Chuck Berry Sessions (1972)	Bio (1973)	Chuck Berry (1975)

Singles from Bio
- 1. "Bio" Released: 1973

Professional ratings
Review scores
Source	Rating
AllMusic	3/5 stars
Christgau's Record Guide	D+

Bio is the seventeenth studio album by Chuck Berry, released in 1973 by Chess Records. The backing musicians were Elephants Memory, except on "Rain Eyes" and "Got It and Gone".

== Track listing ==
All tracks composed by Chuck Berry.

1. "Bio" – 4:25
2. "Hello Little Girl, Goodbye" – 3:56
3. "Woodpecker" – 3:33
4. "Rain Eyes" – 3:47
5. "Aimlessly Driftin'" – 5:42
6. "Got It and Gone" – 4:19
7. "Talkin' About My Buddy" – 6:56

== Personnel ==
- Chuck Berry – guitar, piano, vocals

Elephants Memory

- Wayne "Tex" Gabriel – guitar
- Gary Van Scyoc – bass
- Adam Ippolito – piano
- Rick Frank – drums
- Stan Bronstein – saxophone

Additional musicians

- Billy Peek – guitar on "Rain Eyes" and "Got It and Gone"
- Greg Edick – bass on "Rain Eyes" and "Got It and Gone"
- Ron Reed – drums on "Rain Eyes" and "Got It and Gone"

Technical

- Esmond Edwards – producer
- Bob Scerbo – production manager
- David Krieger – art direction

== Release ==
- Cassette Bio Universal Special Products 1995
- CD Bio Universal Distribution / Universal Japan 2010
- Cassette Bio Chess Special Products
