= Concerto in "B Goode" =

Studio album by Chuck Berry
- Released: June 1969
- Genre: Rock and roll
- Length: 34:33
- Label: Mercury
- Producer: Chuck Berry

Chuck Berry chronology
From St. Louie to Frisco (1968)	Concerto in "B Goode" (1969)	Back Home (1970)

Singles from Concerto in "B Goode
- 1. "It's Too Dark in There" Released: November 1969

Professional ratings
Review scores
Source	Rating
AllMusic	3/5 stars
DownBeat	2.5/5 stars
Rolling Stone	(favorable)

Concerto in "B Goode" is the thirteenth studio album by Chuck Berry, released in 1969 by Mercury Records. The title song is an extended instrumental interpolation of a wide range of themes pioneered in Berry's classic 1957-62 period, running approximately 18 minutes and taking up the entire second side of the record; this is Berry embracing the emerging preference in the rock genre for extended numbers. The title refers to Berry's semi-autobiographical song "Johnny B. Goode."

In his Rolling Stone review, Lester Bangs hailed this as a real return to form: "The Master is back again, and this time he has come up with a record worthy of his reputation."

This was the last album from Berry's brief association with Mercury. The next year, he moved back to Chess Records, for which his earlier recordings had been made.

== Track listing ==
All tracks are written by Chuck Berry.

Side one
No.	Title	Length
1.	"Good Looking Woman"	2:16
2.	"My Woman"	4:50
3.	"It's Too Dark in There"	3:50
4.	"Put Her Down"	4:57

Side two
No.	Title	Length
1.	"Concerto in B. Goode"	18:40
Total length:		34:33

== Personnel ==
=== Musicians ===
- Chuck Berry – guitar, vocals
- Kermit Eugene Cooley – bass guitar
- Dale Grischer – drums
- Billy Peek – guitar, harmonica, keyboard, tambourine

=== Technical ===
- Chuck Berry – producer
- Dennis Drake – mastering
- Richard Lochte – liner notes
