= Chuck (Chuck Berry album) =

Studio album by Chuck Berry
- Released: June 9, 2017
- Recorded: 1991–2014
- Genre: Rock and roll
- Length: 34:51
- Labels: Dualtone, Decca
- Producer: Chuck Berry

Chuck Berry chronology
Chuck Berry – In Concert (2002)	Chuck (2017)

Singles from Chuck
- 1. "Big Boys" Released: March 21, 2017; 2. "Wonderful Woman" Released: April 26, 2017; 3. "Lady B. Goode" Released: May 24, 2017

Chuck is the twentieth and final studio album by American rock and roll singer and guitarist Chuck Berry, released in June 2017. Berry died between the announcement of its recording on his 90th birthday in October 2016 and its release. It posthumously became his first UK Top 10 chart entry since 1977, debuting at No. 9. It was the first Berry studio album to be released in 38 years. The album was positively received by critics who considered it a return to form and a poignant last statement.

== Overview ==
Chuck is Berry's first new studio album in 38 years to consist of mainly new material, since his 1979 record Rockit. The album is dedicated to his wife Thelmetta "Toddy" Berry. The album was announced on Berry's 90th birthday, October 18, 2016, with a release date in 2017. Performers on the album include his live backing band as well as his children. Prior to his death on March 18, 2017, it was implied that this album was to be his last.

== Recording and releases ==
Recording was completed on schedule before his death, for which his estate was prepared. On March 21, 2017, three days after Berry's death, it was announced that the album would be released on June 16, 2017, and "Big Boys" was released as the album's lead single—Berry's first in 40 years. The tune is an upbeat rock and roll song about a boy wanting to do all the things that the bigger boys do.

The album features ten new recordings, including a sequel to his 1958 track "Johnny B. Goode" entitled "Lady B. Goode", and a re-recording of his 1956 song "Havana Moon", retitled and revised lyrically to become "Jamaica Moon" (incidentally, "Havana Moon" had also been re-recorded for Rockit).

== Critical reception ==
Professional ratings
Aggregate scores
Source	Rating
AnyDecentMusic?	7.1/10
Metacritic	71/100
Review scores
Source	Rating
AllMusic	4/5 stars
The A.V. Club	A−
Chicago Tribune	2.5/4 stars
The Guardian	3/5 stars
The Independent	2/5 stars
Mojo	4/5 stars
Pitchfork	6.3/10
Rolling Stone	3/5 stars
The Times	3/5 stars
Vice (Expert Witness)	A−

Chuck received generally positive reviews from critics. At Metacritic, which assigns a rating out of 100 to reviews from mainstream publications, the album received an average score of 72, based on 16 reviews.

Exclaim! critic Daniel Sylvester believed the songs sounded familiar but still distinct from one another, as "Berry covers a lot of musical ground on Chuck, and most importantly, reveals just how much fun he was still having at the end of his storied life."

Noel Murray from The A.V. Club credited the record for making "a casually profound closing statement".

Writing for Vice, Robert Christgau regarded Chuck as "both a summation [Berry] put his all into and a little something he might have followed up if he hadn't up and died at 90". Christgau called the musician "mischievous and horny and locked in", showcasing "undiminished guitar" playing, strong vocals, and shrewd lyrics on "eight well-crafted new ones and two savvy covers that indicate he's learned a few things—the warm songs to the long-suffering wife he married in 1948 and the progeny who chime in like they've earned it have the kind of detail he always reserved for his fictions, musical and otherwise."

== Track listing ==
All songs written by Chuck Berry, except as shown.

1. "Wonderful Woman" – 5:19
2. "Big Boys" – 3:05
3. "You Go to My Head" (Haven Gillespie, J. Fred Coots) – 3:21
4. "3/4 Time (Enchiladas)" (Tony Joe White) – 3:47
5. "Darlin" – 3:20
6. "Lady B. Goode" – 3:00
7. "She Still Loves You" – 2:55
8. "Jamaica Moon" – 3:50
9. "Dutchman" – 3:47
10. "Eyes of Man" – 2:27

== Personnel ==
- Chuck Berry – electric guitar, lead vocals, production

The Blueberry Hill Band

- Robert Lohr – piano
- Jimmy Marsala – bass guitar
- Keith Robinson – drums
- Charles Berry Jr. – guitar
- Ingrid Berry – vocals, harmonica

Additional musicians

- Charles Berry III – guitar on "Wonderful Woman" and "Lady B. Goode"
- Tom Morello – guitar on "Big Boys"
- Nathaniel Rateliff – background vocals on "Big Boys"
- Gary Clark Jr. – guitar on "Wonderful Woman"
- Debra Dobkin – drums and percussion on "Jamaica Moon"
- The New Respects – background vocals on "Darlin'"
- Jeremy Lulito – additional drums

== Charts ==
Sales chart performance for Chuck
Chart (2017)	Peak position
Austrian Albums (Ö3 Austria)	19
Belgian Albums (Ultratop Flanders)	61
Belgian Albums (Ultratop Wallonia)	39
Czech Albums (ČNS IFPI)	21
Dutch Albums (Album Top 100)	61
French Albums (SNEP)	39
German Albums (Offizielle Top 100)	31
Italian Albums (FIMI)	72
New Zealand Heatseekers Albums (RMNZ)	7
Scottish Albums (Official Charts)	10
Spanish Albums (PROMUSICAE)	23
Swedish Albums (Sverigetopplistan)	34
Swiss Albums (Schweizer Hitparade)	14
UK Albums (Official Charts)	9
US Billboard 200	49
US Independent Albums (Billboard)	2
US Top Rock Albums (Billboard)	9

== See also ==
- List of 2017 albums
