= Chuck Berry in Memphis =

Studio album by Chuck Berry
- Released: August 1967
- Genre: Rock and roll
- Length: 30:22
- Label: Mercury
- Producer: Roy Dea, Boo Frazier

Chuck Berry chronology
Chuck Berry's Golden Hits (1967)	Chuck Berry in Memphis (1967)	Live at the Fillmore Auditorium (1967)

Singles from Chuck Berry in Memphis
- 1. "Back to Memphis" Released: April 1967

Professional ratings
Review scores
Source	Rating
Allmusic	3/5 stars

Chuck Berry in Memphis is the eleventh studio album by Chuck Berry, released in 1967 by Mercury Records.

== History ==
Recorded, as the title suggests, in Memphis, Chuck Berry in Memphis differs from previous Chuck Berry albums in its emphasis on horns, which are played by members of the Memphis Horns. It includes two new versions of old songs: Sweet Little Rock and Roller and Oh Baby Doll.

== Track listing ==
All songs written by Chuck Berry except as noted

1. "Back to Memphis" – 2:40
2. "I Do Really Love You" – 2:28
3. "Ramblin' Rose" (Joe Sherman, Noel Sherman) – 2:34
4. "Sweet Little Rock and Roller" (re-recording) – 2:14
5. "My Heart Will Always Belong to You" – 2:40
6. "Oh Baby Doll" (re-recording) – 2:15
7. "Check Me Out" – 2:32
8. "It Hurts Me Too" (Mel London) – 2:57
9. "Bring Another Drink" (Bob Bell, Roy Branker) – 2:34
10. "So Long" (Irving Melsher, Remus Harris, Russ Morgan) – 2:43
11. "Goodnight, Well It's Time to Go" (Calvin Carter, James Hudson) - 2:20
12. "Flying Home" (Some reissues of the album include this song as the final track) - 2:25

== Personnel ==
- Chuck Berry – guitar, vocals
- Satch Arnold – drums
- Tommy Cogbill – bass guitar
- Bobby Emmons – piano
- Andrew Love – tenor saxophone
- Gene Miller – trumpet
- James Mitchell – baritone saxophone
- Reggie Young – guitar
