= Live at the Fillmore Auditorium (Chuck Berry album) =

Live album by Chuck Berry & Steve Miller Band
- Released: 1967
- Venues: Fillmore Auditorium, San Francisco
- Genres: Rock and roll, blues
- Length: 61:13
- Label: Mercury
- Producer: Abe "Voco" Kesh

Chuck Berry & Steve Miller Band chronology
Chuck Berry in Memphis (1967)	Live at the Fillmore Auditorium (1967)	From St. Louie to Frisco (1968)

Live at the Fillmore Auditorium is a 1967 live album by the American musician Chuck Berry with the Steve Miller Band. Released by Mercury Records, it is the second live album by Berry, and the first by the Steve Miller Band (named as the Steve Miller Blues Band).

The album was re-released on CD by Rebound Records, with three additional tracks - "Good Morning Little Schoolgirl", "Reelin' and Rockin'" and "My Ding-a-Ling". Incorrectly marked as bonus tracks are "Feelin' It" and "It Hurts Me Too", both of which are on the original album. The Rebound reissue omits "Wee Baby Blues", which is on the original album. An earlier CD reissue by Mercury additionally includes "Bring Another Drink" and "Worried Life Blues".

== Critical reception ==
Professional ratings
Review scores
Source	Rating
AllMusic	2.5/5 stars
The Encyclopedia of Popular Music	2/5 stars

Rolling Stone wrote that "the most interesting cuts are the instrumentals where Berry applies his rock guitar to Chicago blues and the Steve Miller Band comes into the foreground."

== Track listing ==
All songs written by Chuck Berry except where noted

1. Medley: "Rockin' at the Fillmore" / "Every Day I Have the Blues" (Memphis Slim) (8:36)
2. "C.C. Rider" (Ma Rainey, Lena Arantt) (4:14)
3. "Driftin' Blues" (Charles Brown, Eddie Williams, Johnny Moore) (3:56)
4. "Feelin' It" (4:01)
5. "Flying Home" (Benny Goodman, Lionel Hampton, Sid Robin) (2:44)
6. "(I'm Your) Hoochie Coochie Man" (Willie Dixon) (5:54)
7. "It Hurts Me Too" (unknown) (4:47)
8. "Good Morning Little Schoolgirl" (Sonny Boy Williamson) (2:50)
9. "Fillmore Blues" (3:29)
10. "Wee Baby Blues" (Joe Turner, Pete Johnson) (4:06)
11. "Bring Another Drink" (2:22)
12. "Worried Life Blues" (3:47)
13. "Reelin' and Rockin'" (5:57)
14. "My Ding-a-Ling" (4:36)
15. "Johnny B. Goode" (3:14)

== Personnel ==
- Chuck Berry – guitar, vocals

The Steve Miller Blues Band

- Tim Davis – drums
- Steve Miller – guitar, harmonica; vocals on "It Hurts Me Too"
- Jim "Curley" Cooke – guitar
- Jim Peterman – keyboards
- Lonnie Turner – bass guitar

Technical

- Bill Halverson – engineer
- Wally Heider – recording
- Erik Weber – photography
