= From St. Louie to Frisco =

Studio album by Chuck Berry
- Released: November 1968
- Genre: Rock and roll
- Length: 32:04
- Label: Mercury
- Producer: Chuck Berry

Chuck Berry chronology
Live at the Fillmore Auditorium (1967)	From St. Louie to Frisco (1968)	Concerto in B. Goode (1969)

Singles from From St. Louie to Frisco
- 1. "Louie to Frisco" Released: August 1968

Professional ratings
Review scores
Source	Rating
AllMusic	3.5/5 stars

From St. Louie to Frisco is the twelfth studio album by Chuck Berry, released in 1968 by Mercury Records. One track on the album, "My Tambourine", is the same tune as Berry's later hit for Chess Records, "My Ding-a-Ling", but with less risque lyrics. The Sir Douglas Quintet backed Berry on parts of this album.

== Track listing ==
All songs written and arranged by Chuck Berry, except where noted.

1. "Louie to Frisco" – 2:20
2. "Ma Dear" – 2:15
3. "The Love I Lost" – 3:03
4. "I Love Her, I Love Her" – 5:55
5. "Little Fox" – 2:58
6. "Rock Cradle Rock" – 1:23
7. "Soul Rockin'" – 2:47
8. "I Can't Believe" – 2:43
9. "Misery" – 2:30
10. "My Tambourine" (Dave Bartholomew-Chuck Berry) – 2:17
11. "Oh Captain" – 2:25
12. "Mum's the Word" – 1:33

== Personnel ==
- Chuck Berry – guitar, vocals
- Doug Sahm – guitar
- Quincy Macon – guitar
- Augie Meyers – keyboards
- Johnnie Johnson – piano
- Harvey Kagan – bass guitar
- Forrest Frierson – bass guitar
- Ebbie Hardy – drums
- George Rains – drums
- Eugene Washington – drums
- Frank Morin – saxophone
- Carey Enlow – tenor saxophone
- Martin Fierto – trumpet
- Ingrid Berry – backing vocals

== Charts ==
Chart (1972)	Peak position
US Billboard Top LPs & Tape	185
