= Duckwalk =

Walking while partially squatting

Rock 'N' Roll singer Chuck Berry doing a one-legged hop style "duckwalk" while playing the guitar.

The duckwalk is a form of dance performed by assuming a low partial squatting position and walking forwards, maintaining the low stance. It is similar to stalking and prowling. It is most widely known as a stage element of guitar showmanship popularized by rock and roll guitarist Chuck Berry. It is also a physical exercise commonly used in military training.

Chuck Berry's other guitar playing stunt, his one-legged hop routine with the other leg waving in the air is also known as a duckwalk.

== Origins ==
According to Levon Helm, drummer and singer for The Band, traveling medicine shows and music shows such as F. S. Wolcott's Original Rabbit's Foot Minstrels, established in 1911 and featuring African-American blues singers and dancers, would put on titillating performances in rural areas: "After the finale, they'd have the midnight ramble," Helm told Martin Scorsese in The Last Waltz. With young children off the premises, the show resumed: "The songs would get a little bit juicier. The jokes would get a little funnier and the prettiest dancer would really get down and shake it a few times. A lot of the rock and roll duckwalks and moves came from that."

Others who perpetuated the duckwalk included T-Bone Walker, who already during the 1930s performed dance moves while playing his guitar. Ultimately, it was Chuck Berry who made the duckwalk popular and who is often credited as the inventor. He first used it as a child when he walked "stooping with full-bended knees, but with my back and head vertical" under a table to retrieve a ball and his family found it entertaining; he used it when "performing in New York for the first time and some journalist branded it the duck walk." Chuck Berry performs duckwalk in songs such as the 1956 "rock, rock, rock!" and 1973's "Sweet Little Rock and Roller".

== AC/DC ==
AC/DC guitarist Angus Young, whose musical style was heavily influenced by Chuck Berry, also does a duckwalk, in the form of a one-legged hop, in his shows.

== Military training exercise ==
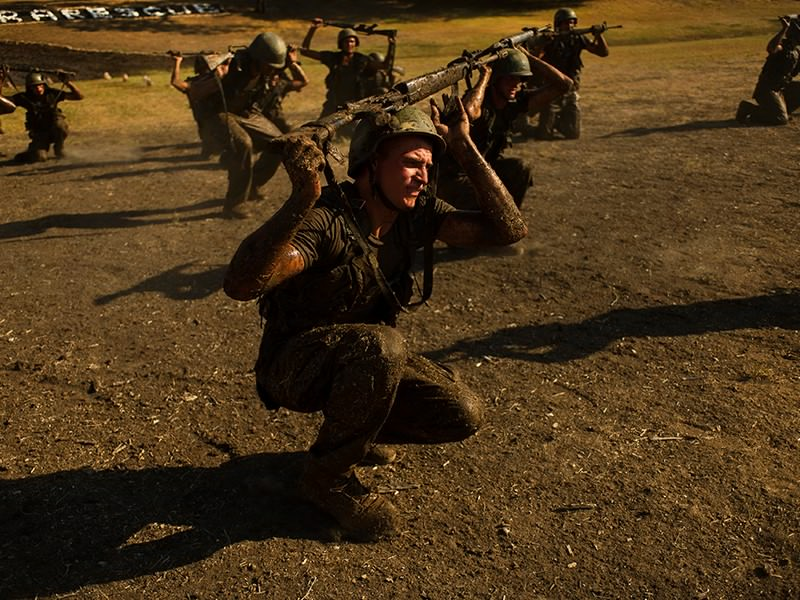
Airmen duck walk with their weapons held atop of their heads during the Air Force Pararescuemen Indoctrination "Hell Week" Course, September 6, 2011, Lackland Air Force Base, Texas.

This exercise is used to strengthen the ankles and thighs. It is also a test of balance, flexibility, and agility.

=== MEPS physical test ===
The duckwalk is one out of 25 exercises in the physical test at United States Military Entrance Processing Command (MEPS). The duckwalk tests to see if a trainee is flat footed or if it hurts to perform the exercise. It also makes sure that the trainee has proper ranges of motion. Trainees who fail the duckwalk are temporarily suspended from MEPS and have to try again at a later date.

== See also ==
- Goose step
