= Rockit (album) =

Studio album by Chuck Berry
- Released: 1979
- Studios: Berry Park, Wentzville, Missouri
- Genre: Rock and roll
- Length: 35:37
- Label: Atco
- Producer: Chuck Berry

Chuck Berry chronology
Chuck Berry Live in Concert (1978)	Rockit (1979)	The Great Twenty-Eight (1982)

Rockit is the nineteenth studio album by Chuck Berry, released in 1979 by Atco Records. It was his only release for the label, following Berry's departure in 1975 from Chess Records and his last studio album for 38 years, until Chuck in 2017.

== Title and packaging ==
The album cover depicted Berry's guitar in the image of the Millennium Falcon starship, from the 1977 film Star Wars. According to Stephen Thomas Erlewine, the artwork bizarrely (and somewhat appealingly)" capitalized on "the post-Star Wars wave as it features Chuck's signature Gibson orbiting the Earth (which also nicely plays into the pun of the title, a pun so slight that it's possible to not realize it's a pun without the artwork)".

== Critical reception ==
Professional ratings
Review scores
Source	Rating
AllMusic	3.5/5 stars
Christgau's Record Guide	B+
DownBeat	3/5 stars
The Rolling Stone Album Guide	3/5 stars

The New York Times wrote that "Berry finally steps out from behind his smiling entertainer's mask and talks about some of the problems he's encountered as a black performer." Reviewing Rockit in 1979 for The Village Voice, Robert Christgau gave the album a B-plus grade and was surprised by its quality:

"The inventor of rock and roll hasn't made an album this listenable in fifteen years--no great new songs, but he's never written better throwaways (or covered 'Ozymandias,' either). Both Berry and Johnny Johnson--the piano half of his sound for a quarter of a century--have tricked up their styles without vitiating or cheapening them, and the result is a groove for all decades. Minor for sure, but what a surprise.

Along with 1964's St. Louis to Liverpool, Christgau considered Rockit one of two full-length albums recorded by Berry in his lifetime that were "worthy of the name", a "groove" record "sharpened by two back-end songs skewering the racist society he'd striven so audaciously to integrate and enlighten". Observer journalist Ron Hart named it among Berry's five best albums.

In a retrospective review for AllMusic, Erlewine wrote that, despite conceding to contemporary music trends with a somewhat "bright and tight" production, Berry offered "three or four terrific songs and a bunch of enjoyable straight-ahead rockers that aren't quite as memorable but sure sound good as they play".

== Track listing ==
All songs written by Chuck Berry

1. "Move It" – 2:27
2. "Oh What a Thrill" – 3:06
3. "I Need You Baby" – 3:09
4. "If I Were" – 3:02
5. "House Lights" – 4:28
6. "I Never Thought" – 3:50
7. "Havana Moon" – 5:05
8. "Wuden't Me" – 2:41
9. "California" – 2:16
10. "Pass Away" – 5:33

== Personnel ==
Musicians

- Chuck Berry – guitar, vocals
- Kenny Buttrey – drums
- Johnnie Johnson – piano
- Jim Marsala – bass
- Bob Wray – bass

Technical

- Tony Gottlieb – production assistance
- Doug Morris – executive producer
- Kyle Lehning – engineer, mixing
- Bob Defrin – art direction
- Don Brautigam – cover illustration
