= Chuck Berry =

American musician (1926–2017)

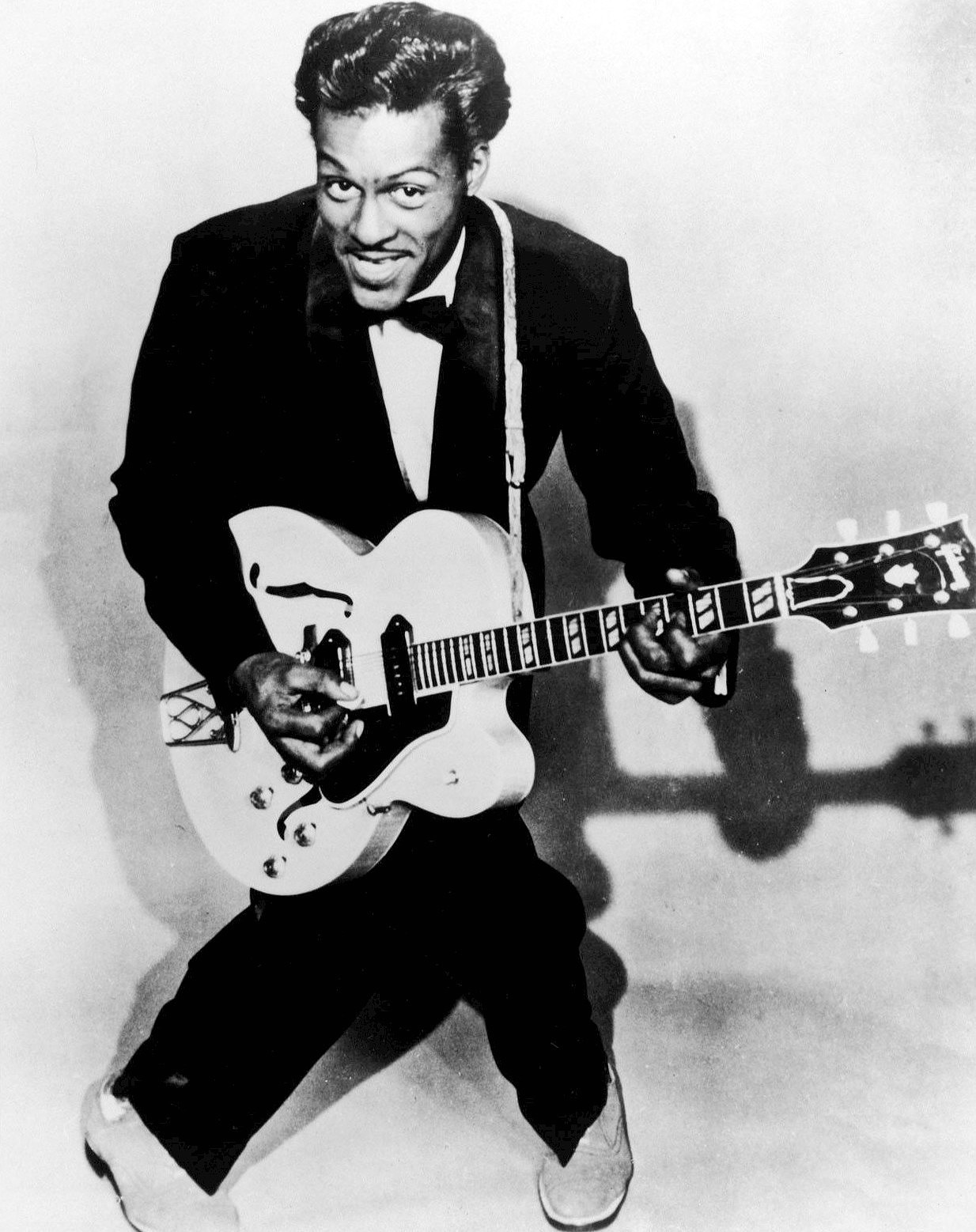
- Berry in 1957
- Born: Charles Edward Anderson Berry; October 18, 1926; St. Louis, Missouri, U.S.
- Died: March 18, 2017 (aged 90); St. Charles County, Missouri, U.S.
- Burial place: Bellerive Gardens Cemetery, St. Louis
- Other name: Father of Rock N' Roll
- Occupations: Singer; musician; songwriter
- Spouse: Themetta Suggs (m. 1948)
- Children: 4
- Musical career
- Genres: Rock and roll; rhythm and blues
- Instruments: Vocals; guitar
- Works: Discography
- Years active: 1953–2017
- Labels: Chess; Mercury; Atco; Dualtone
- Website: chuckberry.com

Charles Edward Anderson Berry (October 18, 1926 – March 18, 2017) was an American guitarist, singer, and songwriter who was one of the pioneers of rock and roll. Nicknamed the "Father of Rock and Roll", he refined and developed rhythm and blues into the major elements that made rock and roll distinctive with songs such as "Maybellene" (1955), "Roll Over Beethoven" (1956), "Rock and Roll Music" (1957), and "Johnny B. Goode" (1958). Writing lyrics that focused on teenage life, consumerism, and music itself, and developing a music style that included guitar solos and showmanship, Berry was a major influence on subsequent rock music.

Born into a middle-class family in St. Louis, Berry had an interest in music from an early age and gave his first public performance at Sumner High School. While still a high school student, he was convicted of armed robbery and was sent to a reformatory, where he was held from 1944 to 1947. After his release, Berry settled into married life and worked at an automobile assembly plant. By early 1953, influenced by the guitar riffs and showmanship techniques of the blues musician T-Bone Walker, Berry began performing with the Johnnie Johnson Trio. His break came when he traveled to Chicago in May 1955 and met Muddy Waters, who suggested he contact Leonard Chess, of Chess Records. With Chess, he recorded "Maybellene"—Berry's adaptation of the country song "Ida Red"—which sold over a million copies, reaching number one on Billboard's rhythm and blues chart.

By the end of the 1950s, Berry was an established star, with several hit records and film appearances and a lucrative touring career. He had also established his own St. Louis nightclub, Berry's Club Bandstand. He was sentenced to three years in prison in January 1962 for offenses under the Mann Act—he had transported a 14-year-old girl across state lines for the purpose of having sex. After his release in 1963, Berry had several more successful songs, including "No Particular Place to Go", "You Never Can Tell", "Nadine" and the novelty song "My Ding-a-Ling"—his only number-one single. However, none of them achieved the same lasting impact of his 1950s songs, and by the 1970s he was more in demand as a nostalgia performer, playing his past material with local backup bands of variable quality.

Berry was among the first musicians to be inducted into the Rock and Roll Hall of Fame on its opening in 1986; he was credited with laying "the groundwork for not only a rock and roll sound but a rock and roll stance." Berry is included in several of Rolling Stone magazine's "greatest of all time" lists; he was ranked fifth on its 2004 and 2011 lists of the 100 Greatest Artists of All Time and 2nd greatest guitarist of all time in 2023. The Rock and Roll Hall of Fame's 500 Songs That Shaped Rock and Roll includes three of Berry's: "Johnny B. Goode", "Maybellene", and "Rock and Roll Music". "Johnny B. Goode" is the only rock-and-roll song included on the Voyager Golden Record.

== Early life ==
Charles Edward Anderson Berry was born on October 18, 1926, in St Louis, the youngest child of Henry William Berry and Martha Bell Berry (née Banks). He grew up in the north St Louis neighbourhood known as the Ville, an area where many middle-class people lived. His father, Henry (1895–1987), was a contractor and deacon of a nearby Baptist church; his mother, Martha (1894–1980), was a certified public school principal. Berry's upbringing allowed him to pursue his interest in music from an early age. He gave his first public performance in 1941 while still a student at Sumner High School in St Louis; he was still a student there in 1944 when he was arrested for armed robbery after robbing three shops in Kansas City, Missouri and then stealing a car at gunpoint with some friends. Berry's account in his autobiography is that his car broke down and he flagged down a passing car and stole it at gunpoint with a non-functional pistol. He was convicted and sent to the Intermediate Reformatory for Young Men (now the Algoa Correctional Center) in Jefferson City, Missouri, where he formed a singing quartet and did some boxing. The singing group became competent enough that the authorities allowed it to perform outside the detention facility. Berry was released from the reformatory on his 21st birthday in 1947.

On October 28, 1948, Berry married Themetta "Toddy" Suggs, who gave birth to Darlin Ingrid Berry on October 3, 1950. Chuck supported his family by taking various jobs in St Louis, working briefly as a factory worker at two automobile assembly plants and as a janitor in the apartment building where he and his wife lived. Afterwards he trained as a beautician at the Poro College of Cosmetology, founded by Annie Turnbo Malone. He was doing well enough by 1950 to buy a "small three-room brick cottage with a bath" on Whittier Street, which is now listed as the Chuck Berry House on the National Register of Historic Places.

== Career ==
=== 1952–1955: Music career beginnings ===
By the early 1950s, Chuck Berry was working with local bands in clubs in St. Louis as an extra source of income. He had been playing blues since his teens, and he borrowed both guitar riffs and showmanship techniques from the blues musician T-Bone Walker. He also took guitar lessons from his friend, jazz guitarist Ira Harris, which laid the foundation for his guitar style. By early 1953, Berry was performing with Johnnie Johnson's trio, starting a long-time collaboration with the pianist. The band played blues and ballads as well as country. Berry wrote, "Curiosity provoked me to lay a lot of our country stuff on our predominantly black audience and some of our black audience began whispering 'who is that black hillbilly at the Cosmo?' After they laughed at me a few times, they began requesting the hillbilly stuff and enjoyed dancing to it."

In 1954, Berry recorded the tracks "I Hope These Words Will Find You Well" and "Oh, Maria!" with the group Joe Alexander & the Cubans. The songs were released as a single on the Ballad label. Berry's showmanship, along with a mix of country tunes and R&B tunes, sung in the style of Nat King Cole set to the music of Muddy Waters brought in a wider audience, particularly affluent white people.

=== 1955–1962: Signing with Chess: "Maybellene" to "Come On" ===
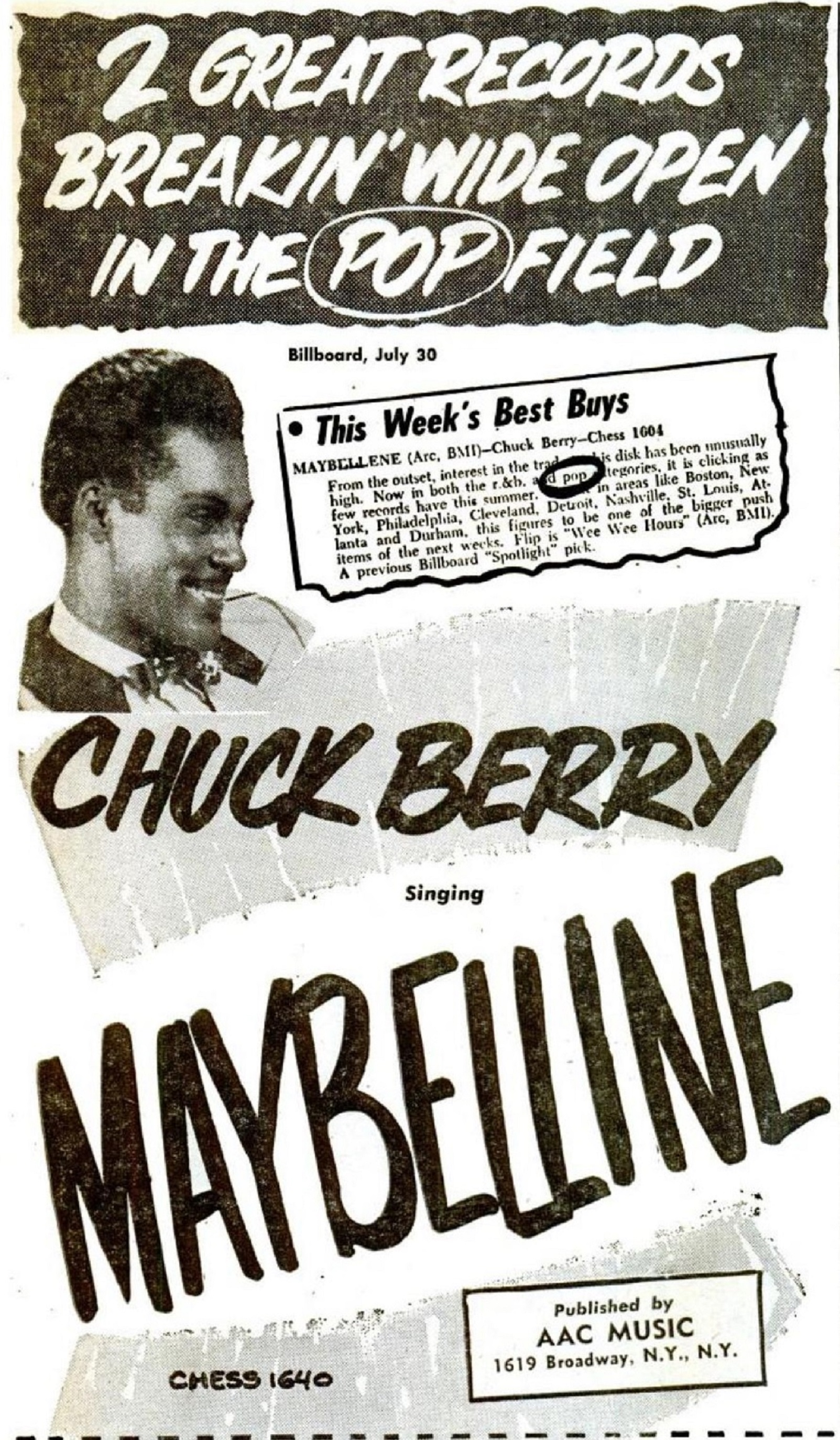
Billboard advertisement, August 6, 1955

In May 1955, Berry traveled to Chicago, where he met Muddy Waters who suggested he contact Leonard Chess, of Chess Records. Berry thought his blues music would interest Chess, but Chess was a larger fan of Berry's take on "Ida Red". On May 21, 1955, Berry recorded an adaptation of the song "Ida Red", under the title "Maybellene", with Johnnie Johnson on the piano, Jerome Green (from Bo Diddley's band) on the maracas, Ebby Hardy on the drums and Willie Dixon on the bass. "Maybellene" sold over a million copies, reaching number one on Billboard magazine's rhythm and blues chart and number five on its Best Sellers in Stores chart for September 10, 1955. Berry said, "It came out at the right time when Afro-American music was spilling over into the mainstream pop."

When Berry first saw a copy of the Maybellene record, he was surprised that two other individuals, including DJ Alan Freed, had been given writing credit; that would entitle them to some of the royalties. After a court battle, Berry was able to regain full writing credit.

At the end of June 1956, his song "Roll Over Beethoven" reached number 29 on the Billboard's Top 100 chart, and Berry toured as one of the "Top Acts of '56". He and Carl Perkins became friends. Perkins said that "I knew when I first heard Chuck that he'd been affected by country music. I respected his writing; his records were very, very great." In late 1957, Berry took part in Alan Freed's "Biggest Show of Stars for 1957", touring the United States with the Everly Brothers, Buddy Holly, and others. He was a guest on ABC's Guy Mitchell Show, singing his hit song "Rock 'n' Roll Music". The hits continued from 1957 to 1959, with Berry scoring over a dozen chart singles during this period, including the US Top 10 hits "School Days", "Rock and Roll Music", "Sweet Little Sixteen", and "Johnny B. Goode". He appeared in two early rock-and-roll movies: Rock Rock Rock (1956), in which he sang "You Can't Catch Me", and Go, Johnny, Go! (1959), in which he had a speaking role as himself and performed "Johnny B. Goode", "Memphis, Tennessee", and "Little Queenie". His performance of "Sweet Little Sixteen" at the Newport Jazz Festival in 1958 was captured in the motion picture Jazz on a Summer's Day.

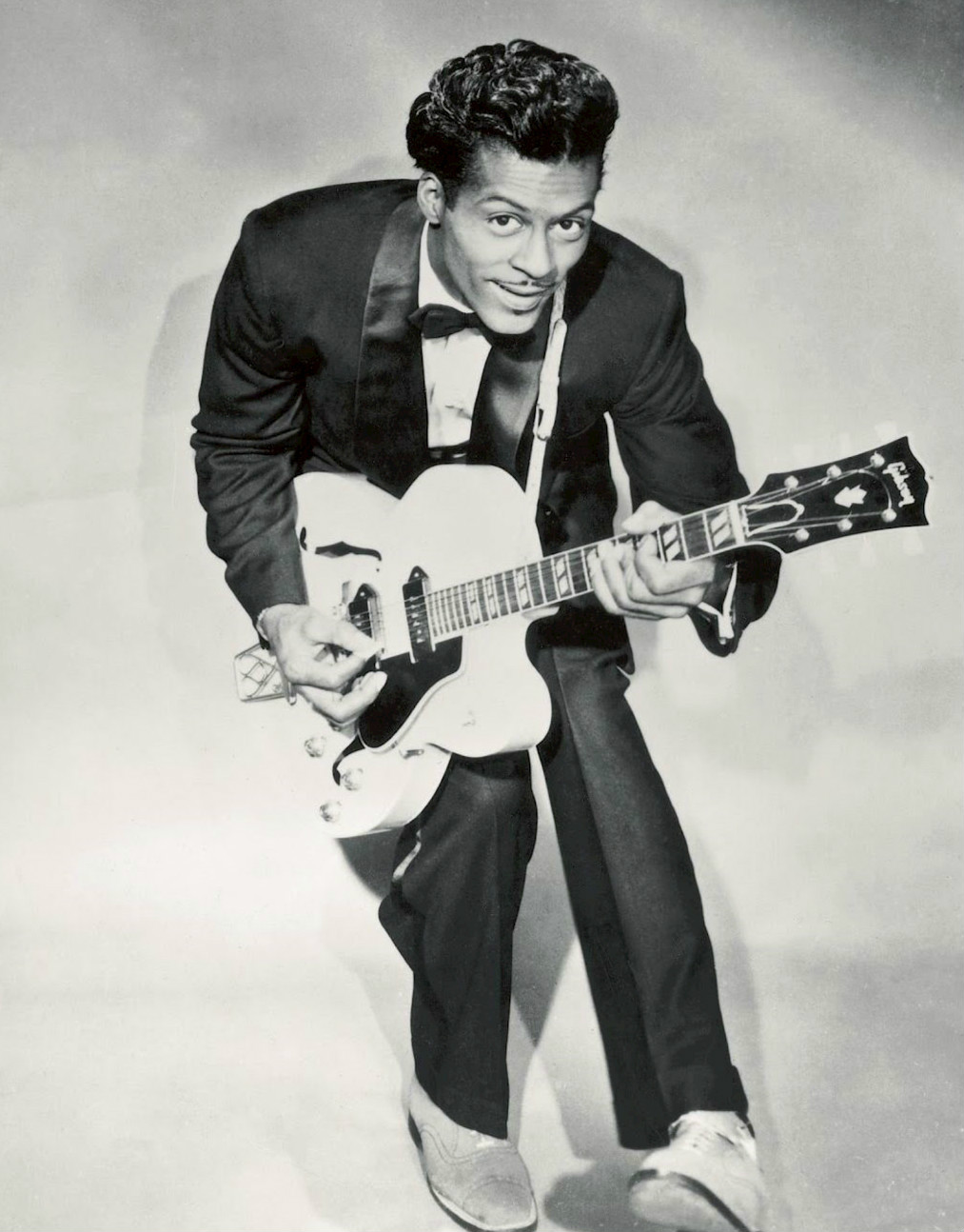
Berry in a 1958 publicity photo

The opening guitar riff of "Johnny B. Goode" is similar to the one used by Louis Jordan in his "Ain't That Just Like a Woman" (1946). Berry acknowledged the debt to Jordan and several sources have indicated that his work was influenced by Jordan in general.

By the end of the 1950s Berry was a high-profile established star with several hit records and film appearances and a lucrative touring career. He had opened a racially integrated St Louis nightclub, Berry's Club Bandstand, and invested in real estate. But in December 1959, he was arrested under the Mann Act after allegations that he had had sex with a 14-year-old Apache waitress, Janice Escalante, whom he had transported across state lines to work as a hatcheck girl at his club. After a two-week trial in March 1960, he was convicted, fined $5,000 (equivalent to $54,000 in 2025), and sentenced to five years in prison. He appealed against the decision, arguing that the judge's comments and attitude were racist and prejudiced the jury against him. The appeal was upheld and a second trial was heard in May and June 1961, resulting in another conviction and a three-year prison sentence. After another appeal failed, Berry served one and a half years in prison from February 1962 to October 1963. He continued recording and performing during the trials, but his output had slowed as his popularity declined; his last single released before he was imprisoned was "Come On".

=== 1963–1969: "Nadine" and move to Mercury ===
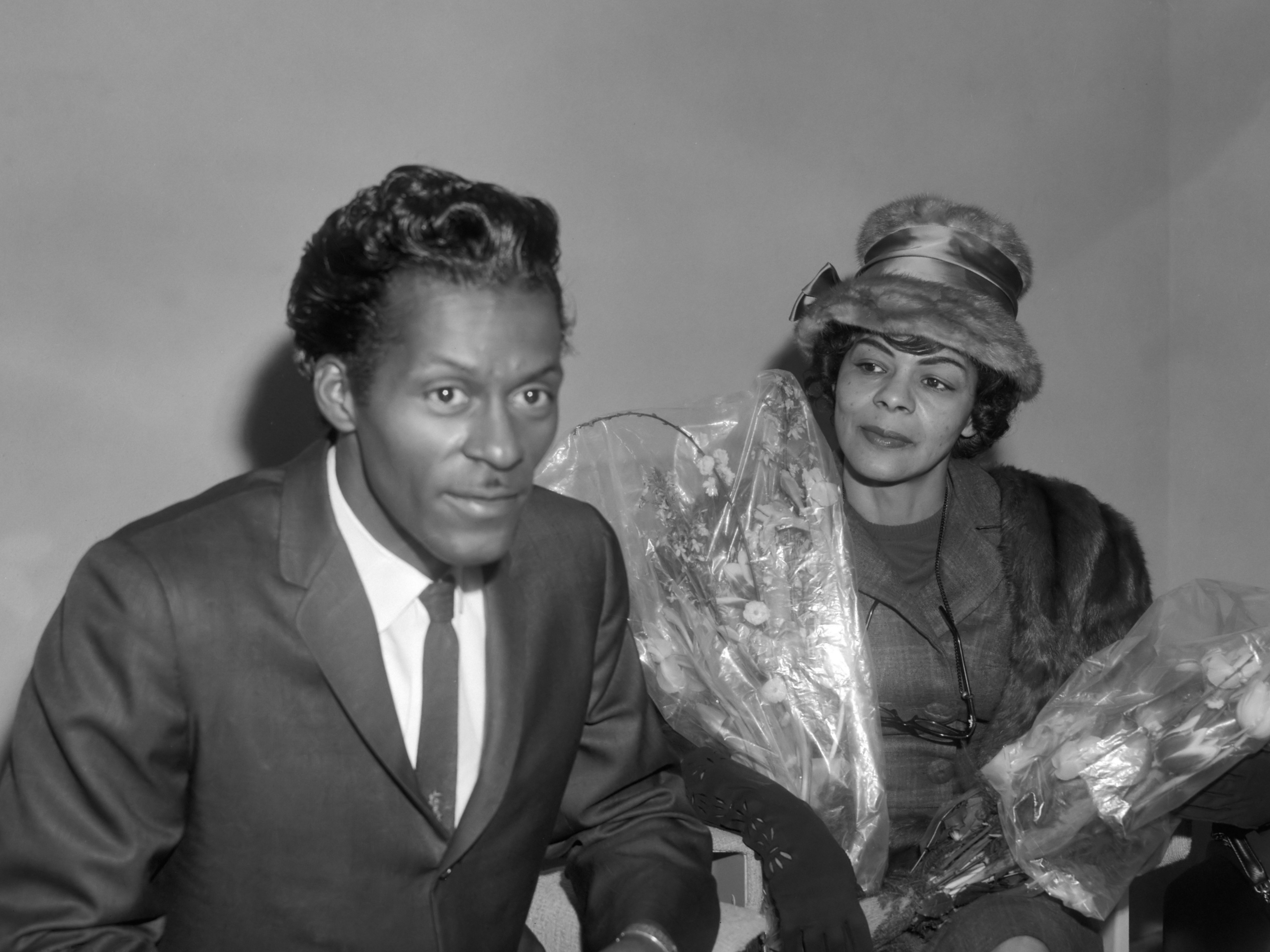
Berry and his sister Lucy Ann, 1965

When Berry was released from prison in 1963, his return to recording and performing was made easier because British invasion bands—notably the Beatles and the Rolling Stones—had sustained interest in his music by releasing cover versions of his songs, and other bands had reworked some of them, such as the Beach Boys' 1963 hit "Surfin' U.S.A.", which used the melody of Berry's "Sweet Little Sixteen". In 1964 and 1965 Berry released eight singles, including three that were commercially successful, reaching the top 20 of the Billboard 100: "No Particular Place to Go" (a humorous reworking of "School Days", concerning the introduction of seat belts in cars), "You Never Can Tell", and the rocking "Nadine". Between 1966 and 1969, Berry released five albums for Mercury Records, including his second live album (and first recorded entirely onstage), Live at Fillmore Auditorium; for the live album he was backed by the Steve Miller Band.

Although this period was not a successful one for studio work, Berry was still a top concert draw. In May 1964, he had made a successful tour of the UK, but when he returned in January 1965, his behavior was erratic and moody, and his touring style of using unrehearsed local backing bands and a strict nonnegotiable contract was earning him a reputation as a difficult and unexciting performer. He also played at large events in North America, such as the Schaefer Music Festival, in New York City's Central Park in July 1969, and the Toronto Rock and Roll Revival festival in October.

=== 1970–1979: Back to Chess: "My Ding-a-Ling" to White House concert ===
Berry helped give life to a subculture ... Even "My Ding-a-Ling", a fourth-grade wee-wee joke that used to mortify true believers at college concerts, permitted a lot of twelve-year-olds new insight into the moribund concept of "dirty" when it hit the airwaves ...

— Robert Christgau

Berry returned to Chess from 1970 to 1973. There were no hit singles from the 1970 album Back Home, but in 1972, Chess released a live recording of "My Ding-a-Ling", a novelty song that he had recorded in a different version as "My Tambourine" on his 1968 LP From St Louie to Frisco. The track became his only number-one single. A live recording of "Reelin' and Rockin'", issued as a follow-up single in the same year, was his last Top 40 hit in both the US and the UK. Both singles were included on the part-live, part-studio album The London Chuck Berry Sessions (other albums of London sessions were recorded by Chess's mainstay artists Muddy Waters and Howlin' Wolf). Berry's second tenure with Chess ended with the 1975 album Chuck Berry, after which he did not make a studio record until Rockit for Atco Records in 1979, which would be his last studio album for 38 years.

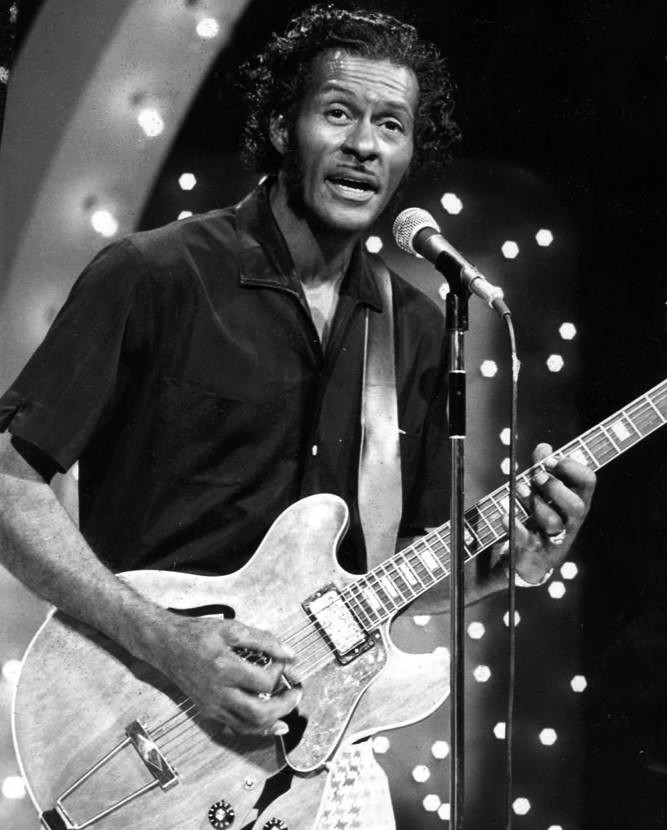
Berry as guest host of The Midnight Special in 1973

By the 1970s Berry was more in demand as a nostalgia performer, playing his past material with local backup bands of variable quality. He toured on the strength of his earlier successes. He was on the road for many years, carrying only his Gibson guitar, confident that he could hire a band that already knew his music no matter where he went. AllMusic said that in this period his "live performances became increasingly erratic, ... working with terrible backup bands and turning in sloppy, out-of-tune performances" which "tarnished his reputation with younger fans and oldtimers" alike. In March 1972, he was filmed, at the BBC Television Theatre in Shepherds Bush, for Chuck Berry in Concert, part of a 60-date tour backed by the band Rocking Horse. Among the many bandleaders performing a backup role with Berry in the 1970s were Bruce Springsteen and Steve Miller when each was just starting his career. (Springsteen related in the documentary film Hail! Hail! Rock 'n' Roll that Berry did not give the band a set list and expected the musicians to follow his lead after each guitar intro. Berry did not speak to the band after the show. Nevertheless Springsteen backed Berry again when he appeared at the concert for the Rock and Roll Hall of Fame in 1995.) At the request of Jimmy Carter, Berry performed at the White House on June 1, 1979.

In 1979 Berry pleaded guilty to evading nearly $110,000 in federal income tax owed on his 1973 joint earnings of $374,982. He was sentenced to 120 days in prison.

=== 1980–2017: Last years on the road ===
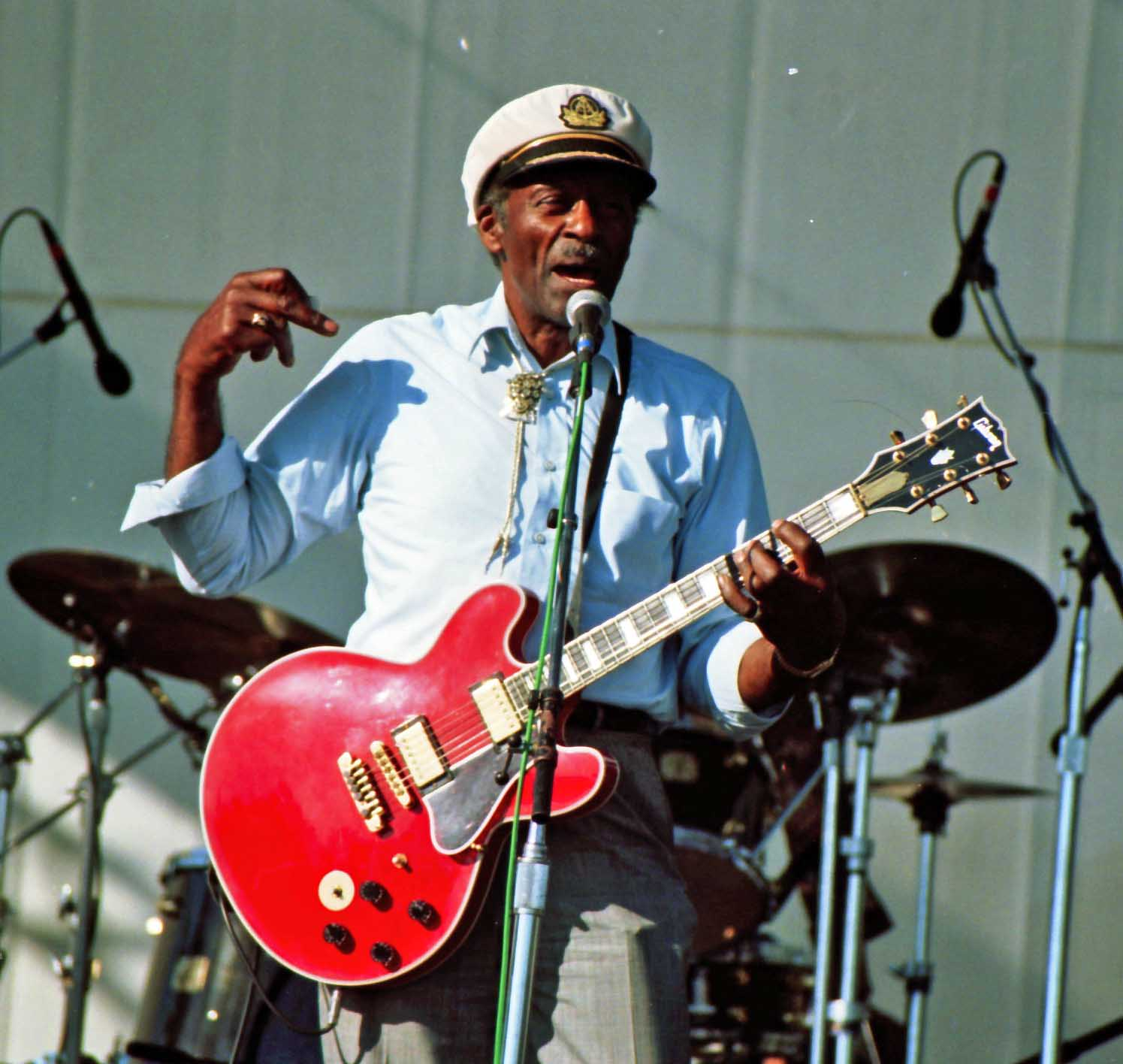
Berry performing at the Long Beach Blues Festival, August 1997

Berry continued to play 70 to 100 one-nighters per year in the 1980s, still traveling solo and requiring a local band to back him at each stop. In 1986, Taylor Hackford made a documentary film, Hail! Hail! Rock 'n' Roll, of a celebration concert for Berry's sixtieth birthday, organized by Keith Richards. Eric Clapton, Etta James, Julian Lennon, Robert Cray, and Linda Ronstadt, among others, appeared with Berry on stage and in the film. During the concert, Berry played a Gibson ES-355, the luxury version of the ES-335 that he favored on his 1970s tours. Richards played a black Fender Telecaster Custom, Cray a Fender Stratocaster and Clapton a Gibson ES 350T, the same model that Berry used on his early recordings.

In the late 1980s, Berry bought the Southern Air, a restaurant in Wentzville, Missouri. In 1982, Berry performed a television special at The Roxy in West Hollywood with Tina Turner as his special guest. The concert was released a year later on home video.

In November 2000, Berry was sued by his former pianist Johnnie Johnson who claimed that he had co-written over 50 songs, including "No Particular Place to Go", "Sweet Little Sixteen" and "Roll Over Beethoven", that credit Berry alone. The case was dismissed when the judge ruled that too much time had passed since the songs were written.

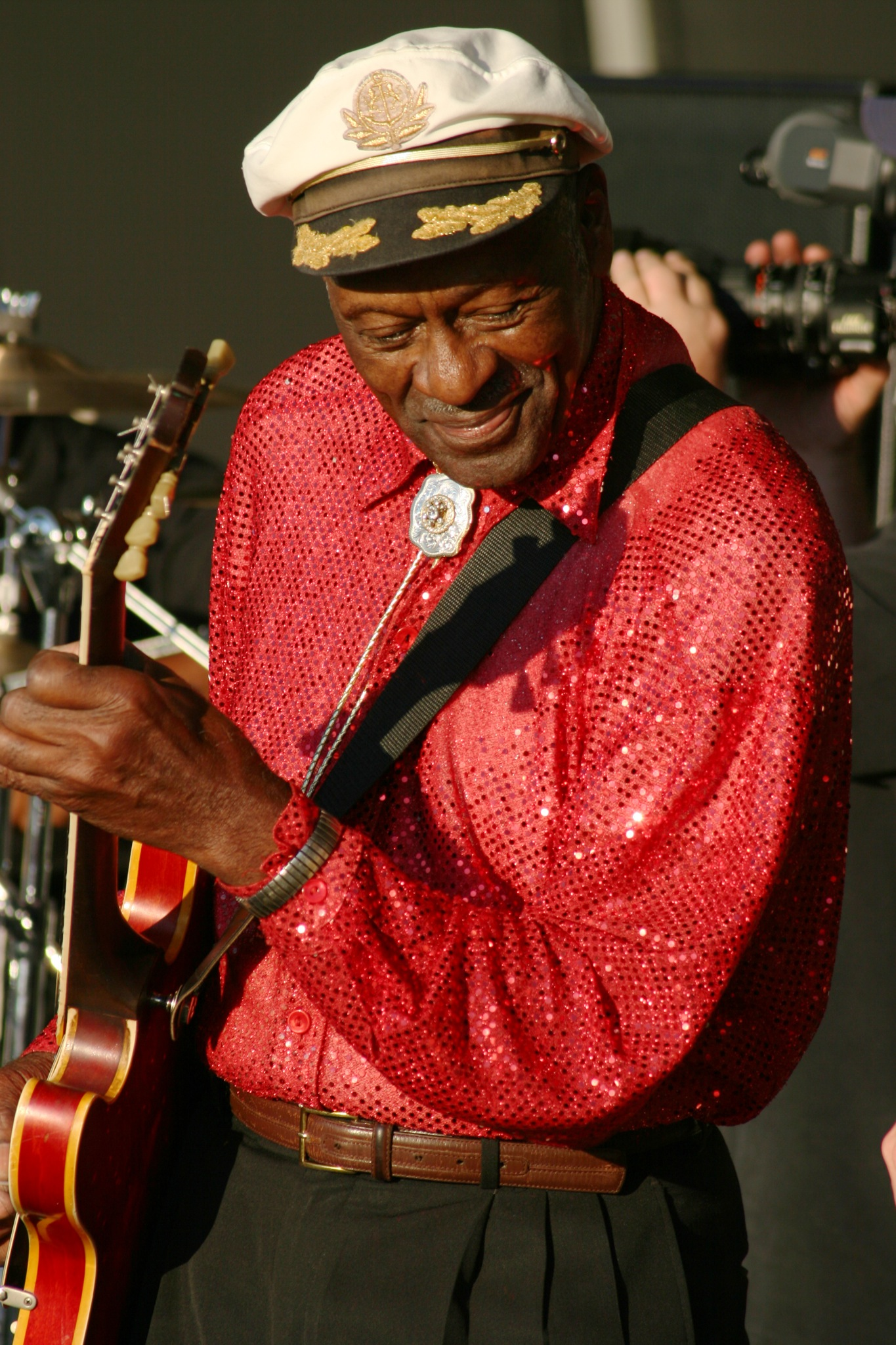
Berry performing at Virgin Festival in Baltimore, August 2008

In 2008, Berry toured Europe, with stops in Sweden, Norway, Finland, the United Kingdom, the Netherlands, Ireland, Switzerland, Poland, and Spain. In mid-2008, he played at the Virgin Festival in Baltimore. During a concert on New Year's Day 2011 in Chicago, Berry, suffering from exhaustion, passed out and had to be helped off stage.

Berry lived in Ladue, Missouri, approximately 10 miles (16 km) west of St. Louis. He also had a home at "Berry Park", near Wentzville where he lived part-time since the 1950s and was the home in which he died. The home with the guitar-shaped swimming pool is seen in scenes near the end of the film Hail! Hail! Rock 'n' Roll. When Berry performed he often required payment up front in a paper bag which he transferred to an attaché case, PBS on In Their Own Words, relates. He gave interviews where he talked about having been ripped off during his early career. Thus he protected his own interests.

Berry regularly performed one Wednesday each month at Blueberry Hill, a restaurant and bar located in the Delmar Loop neighborhood of St. Louis, from 1996 to 2014. Berry announced on his 90th birthday that his first new studio album since Rockit in 1979, entitled Chuck, would be released in 2017. His first new record in 38 years, it includes his children, Charles Berry Jr. and Ingrid, on guitar and harmonica with songs "covering the spectrum from hard-driving rockers to soulful thought-provoking time capsules of a life's work" and dedicated to his wife Toddy.

== Death and funeral ==
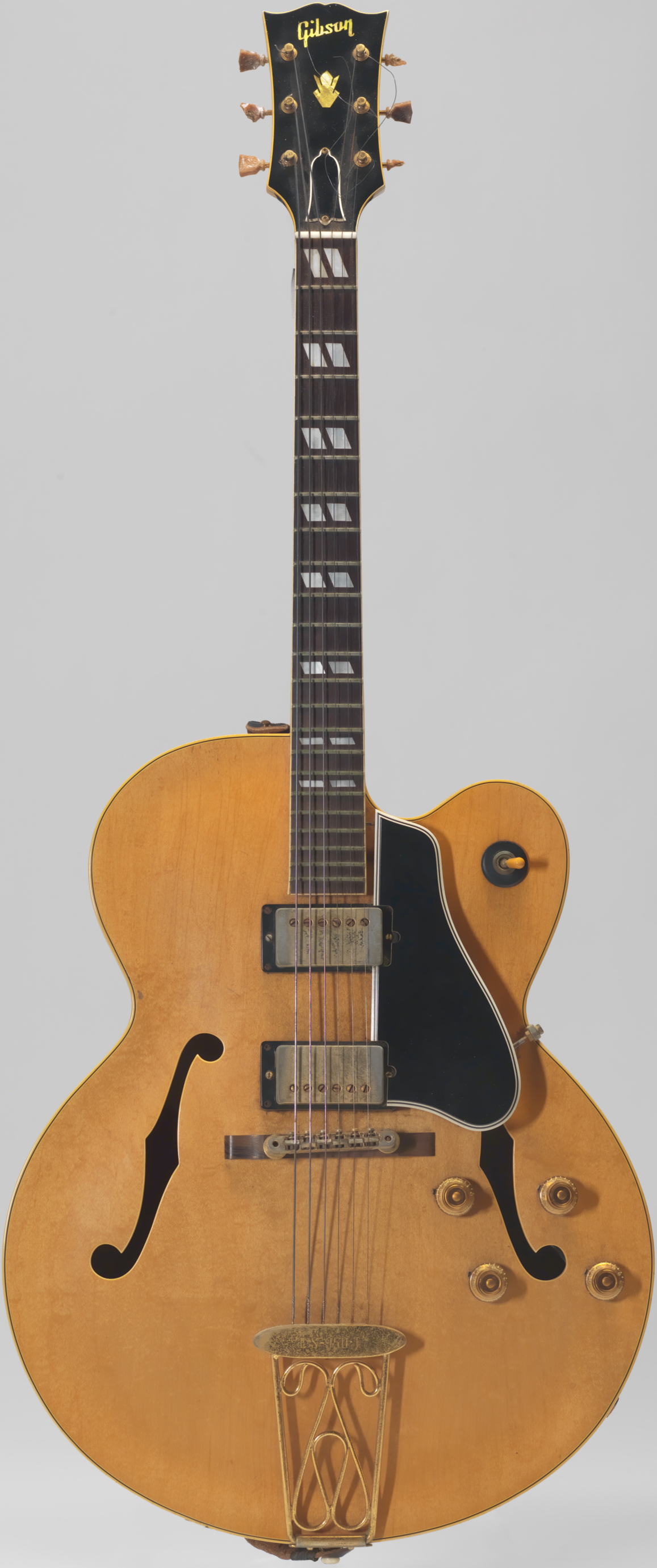
Chuck Berry's guitar, Maybellene, a Gibson ES-350T

On March 18, 2017, Berry was found unresponsive at his home near Wentzville in St. Charles County, Missouri. Emergency workers called to the scene were unable to revive him, and he was pronounced dead by his personal physician. TMZ posted an audio recording on its website in which a 911 operator can be heard responding to a reported cardiac arrest at Berry's home.

Berry's funeral was held on April 9, 2017, at The Pageant, in Berry's home town of St. Louis. He was remembered with a public viewing by family, friends, and fans in The Pageant. He was viewed and buried with a new cherry-red Gibson ES-355 guitar like the one he used throughout his career, bolted to the inside lid of the coffin and with flower arrangements that included one sent by the Rolling Stones in the shape of a guitar. Afterwards a private service was held in the club celebrating Berry's life and musical career, with the Berry family inviting 300 members of the public into the service. Gene Simmons of Kiss gave an impromptu eulogy at the service, while Little Richard was scheduled to lead the funeral procession but was unable to attend due to an illness. The night before, many St. Louis area bars held a mass toast at 10 pm in Berry's honor.

One of Berry's attorneys estimated that his estate was worth $50 million, including $17 million in music rights. Berry's music publishing accounted for $13 million of the estate's value. The Berry estate owned roughly half of his songwriting credits (mostly from his later career), while BMG Rights Management controlled the other half; most of Berry's recordings are currently owned by Universal Music Group. In September 2017, Dualtone, the label which released Berry's final album, Chuck, agreed to publish all his compositions in the United States.

Berry is interred in a mausoleum in Bellerive Gardens Cemetery in St. Louis.

== Controversies ==
In 1987, Berry was charged with assaulting a woman at New York's Gramercy Park Hotel. He was accused of causing "lacerations of the mouth, requiring five stitches, two loose teeth, [and] contusions of the face." He pleaded guilty to a lesser charge of harassment and paid a $250 fine. In 1990, he was sued by several women who claimed that he had installed a video camera in the bathroom of his restaurant. Berry claimed that he had the camera installed to catch a worker who was suspected of stealing from the restaurant. Although his guilt was never proven in court, Berry opted for a class action settlement. One of his biographers, Bruce Pegg, estimated that it cost Berry over $1.2 million plus legal fees. His lawyers said he had been the victim of a conspiracy to profit from his wealth.

Reportedly, according to Rolling Stone, a 1990 police raid on his house found intimate videotapes of women. Also found in the raid were 62 grams of marijuana. Felony drug charges were filed and Berry agreed to plead guilty to misdemeanor possession of marijuana. He was given a six-month suspended jail sentence, placed on two years unsupervised probation, and was ordered to donate $5,000 to a local hospital.

== Legacy ==
While no individual can be said to have invented rock and roll, Chuck Berry comes the closest of any single figure to being the one who put all the essential pieces together. It was his particular genius to graft country & western guitar licks onto a rhythm & blues chassis in his very first single, "Maybellene".

— Rock and Roll Hall of Fame

A pioneer of rock and roll, Berry was a significant influence on the development of both the music and the attitude associated with the rock music lifestyle. With songs such as "Maybellene" (1955), "Roll Over Beethoven" (1956), "Rock and Roll Music" (1957) and "Johnny B. Goode" (1958), Berry refined and developed rhythm and blues into the major elements that made rock and roll distinctive, with lyrics successfully aimed to appeal to the early teenage market by using graphic and humorous descriptions of teen dances, fast cars, high school life, and consumer culture, and utilizing guitar solos and showmanship that would be a major influence on subsequent rock music. Thus Berry, the songwriter, according to critic Jon Pareles, invented rock as "a music of teenage wishes fulfilled and good times (even with cops in pursuit)." Berry contributed three things to rock music: an irresistible swagger, a focus on the guitar riff as the primary melodic element and an emphasis on songwriting as storytelling. His records are a rich storehouse of the essential lyrical, showmanship and musical components of rock and roll. In addition to the Beatles and the Rolling Stones, a large number of significant popular-music performers have recorded Berry's songs. Although not technically accomplished, his guitar style is distinctive—he incorporated electronic effects to mimic the sound of bottleneck blues guitarists and drew on the influence of guitar players such as Carl Hogan, and T-Bone Walker to produce a clear and exciting sound that many later guitarists would acknowledge as an influence in their own style. Berry's showmanship has been influential on other rock guitarists, particularly his one-legged hop routine, and the "duck walk", which he first used as a child when he walked "stooping with full-bended knees, but with my back and head vertical" under a table to retrieve a ball and his family found it entertaining; he used it when "performing in New York for the first time and some journalist branded it the duck walk."

On July 29, 2011, Berry was honored in a dedication of an eight-foot, in-motion Chuck Berry Statue in the Delmar Loop in St. Louis right across the street from Blueberry Hill. Berry said, "It's glorious—I do appreciate it to the highest, no doubt about it. That sort of honor is seldom given out. But I don't deserve it."

Rock critic Robert Christgau considers Berry "the greatest of the rock and rollers", and John Lennon said, "if you tried to give rock and roll another name, you might call it 'Chuck Berry'." Ted Nugent said, "If you don't know every Chuck Berry lick, you can't play rock guitar." Bob Dylan called Berry "the Shakespeare of rock 'n' roll". Bruce Springsteen tweeted, "Chuck Berry was rock's greatest practitioner, guitarist, and the greatest pure rock 'n' roll writer who ever lived." When asked what caused the explosion of the popularity of rock 'n roll which took place in the 1950s, with him and a handful of others, mainly him, Berry said, "Well, actually they begin to listen to it, you see, because certain stations played certain music. The music that we, the blacks, played, the cultures were so far apart, we would have to have a play station in order to play it. The cultures begin to come together, and you begin to see one another's vein of life, then the music came together."

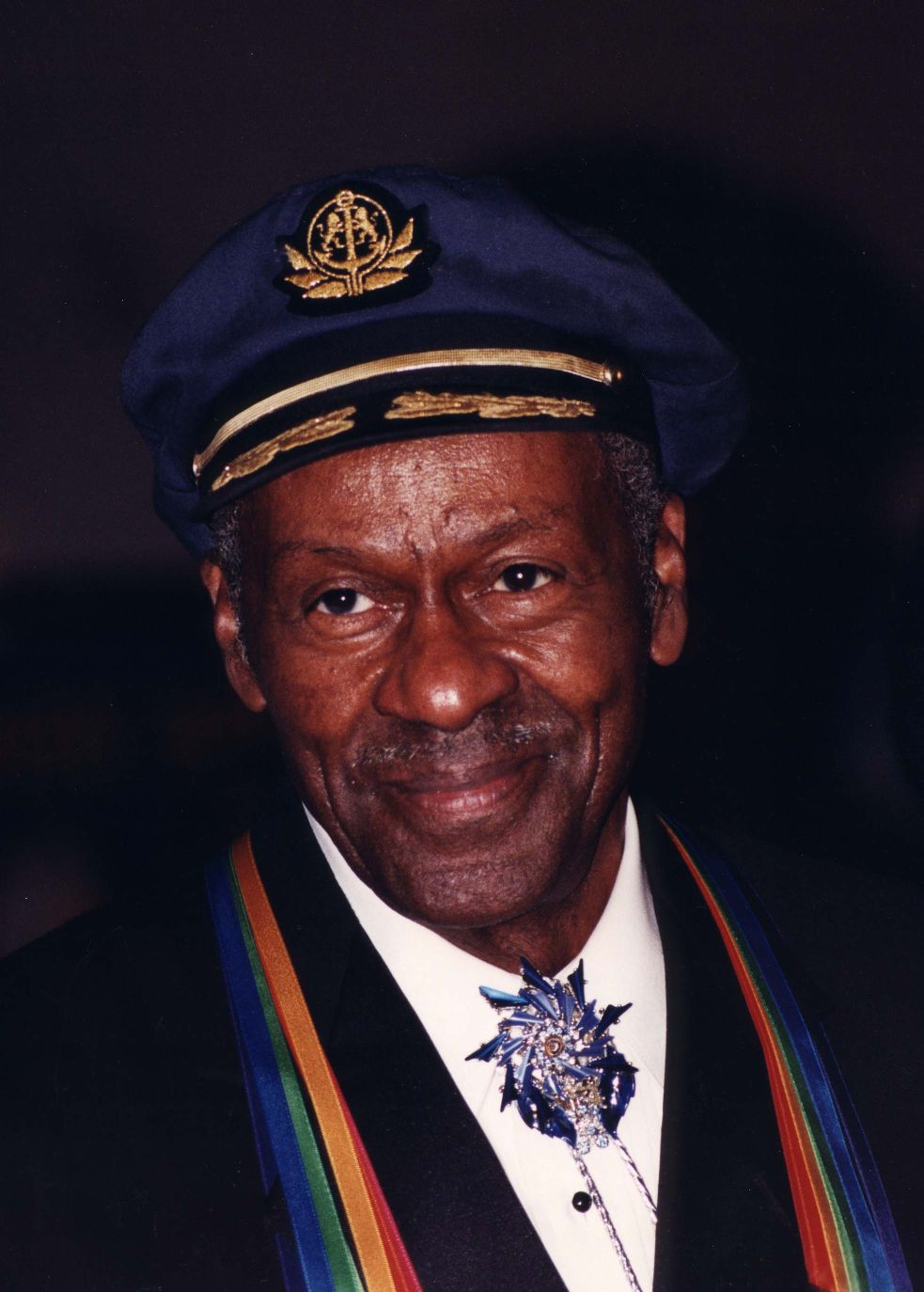
Chuck Berry wearing the Kennedy Center Honors, 2000

Among the honors Berry received were the Grammy Lifetime Achievement Award in 1984 and the Kennedy Center Honors in 2000. He was ranked seventh on Time magazine's 2009 list of the 10 best electric guitar players of all time. On May 14, 2002, he was honored as one of the first BMI Icons at the 50th annual BMI Pop Awards. He was presented the award along with BMI affiliates Bo Diddley and Little Richard. In August 2014, Berry was made a laureate of the Polar Music Prize.

Berry is included in several of Rolling Stone magazine's "Greatest of All Time" lists. In October 2023, the magazine ranked him number 2 in its list of the "250 Greatest Guitarists of All Time". In November his compilation album The Great Twenty-Eight was ranked 21st in Rolling Stone's 500 Greatest Albums of All Time. In March 2004, Berry was ranked fifth on the list of "The Immortals– The 100 Greatest Artists of All Time". Joe Perry wrote in tribute, "As a songwriter, Chuck Berry is like the Ernest Hemingway of rock & roll. He gets right to the point. He tells a story in short sentences. You get a great picture in your mind of what's going on, in a very short amount of space, in well-picked words... kids today are playing the same three chords, trying to play in that same style. Turn the guitars up, and it's punk rock. It's the Ramones and the Sex Pistols. I hear it in the White Stripes, too. People will always cover Chuck Berry songs. When bands go do their homework, they will have to listen to Chuck Berry. If you want to learn about rock & roll, if you want to play rock & roll, you have to start there." In December 2004, six of his songs were included in "Rolling Stone's 500 Greatest Songs of All Time": "Johnny B. Goode" (No. 7), "Maybellene" (No. 18), "Roll Over Beethoven" (No. 97), "Rock and Roll Music" (No. 128), "Sweet Little Sixteen" (No. 272) and "Brown Eyed Handsome Man" (No. 374). In June 2008, his song "Johnny B. Goode" was ranked first in the "100 Greatest Guitar Songs of All Time". In 2023, Rolling Stone ranked Berry at number 96 on its list of the 200 Greatest Singers of All Time.

The journalist Chuck Klosterman has argued that in 300 years Berry will still be remembered as the rock musician who most closely captured the essence of rock and roll. Time magazine said, "There was no one like Elvis. But there was 'definitely' no one like Chuck Berry." Rolling Stone called him "the father of rock & roll" who "gave the music its sound and its attitude, even as he battled racism—and his own misdeeds—all the way", reporting that Leonard Cohen said, "All of us are footnotes to the words of Chuck Berry." Kevin Strait, curator of the National Museum of African American History and Culture in Washington, DC, said that Berry is "one of the primary sonic architects of rock and roll."

According to Cleveland.com's Troy L. Smith, "Chuck Berry didn't invent rock and roll all by his lonesome. But he was the man who took rhythm and blues and transformed it into a new genre that would ever change popular music. Songs like 'Maybellene,' 'Johnny B. Goode,' 'Roll Over Beethoven' and 'Rock and Roll Music' would showcase the core elements of what rock and roll would become. The sound, the format and the style were built on the music Berry created. To some extent, everyone who followed was a copycat."

"Johnny B. Goode" is the only rock-and-roll song included on the Voyager Golden Record. In 2020, the International Astronomical Union named a small crater on Mercury after Berry.

The song "Berry Rides Again" appears on the first Steppenwolf album Steppenwolf in 1968.

== Discography ==
=== Studio albums ===
- After School Session (1957)
- One Dozen Berrys (1958)
- Berry Is on Top (1959)
- Rockin' at the Hops (1960)
- New Juke Box Hits (1961)
- Two Great Guitars (with Bo Diddley) (1964)
- St. Louis to Liverpool (1964)
- Chuck Berry in London (1965)
- Fresh Berry's (1965)
- Chuck Berry's Golden Hits (1967)
- Chuck Berry in Memphis (1967)
- From St. Louie to Frisco (1968)
- Concerto in "B Goode" (1969)
- Back Home (1970)
- San Francisco Dues (1971)
- The London Chuck Berry Sessions (1972)
- Bio (1973)
- Chuck Berry (1975)
- Rockit (1979)
- Chuck (2017)
