= Guitar showmanship =

Gimmicks, jumps, or other stunts with a guitar

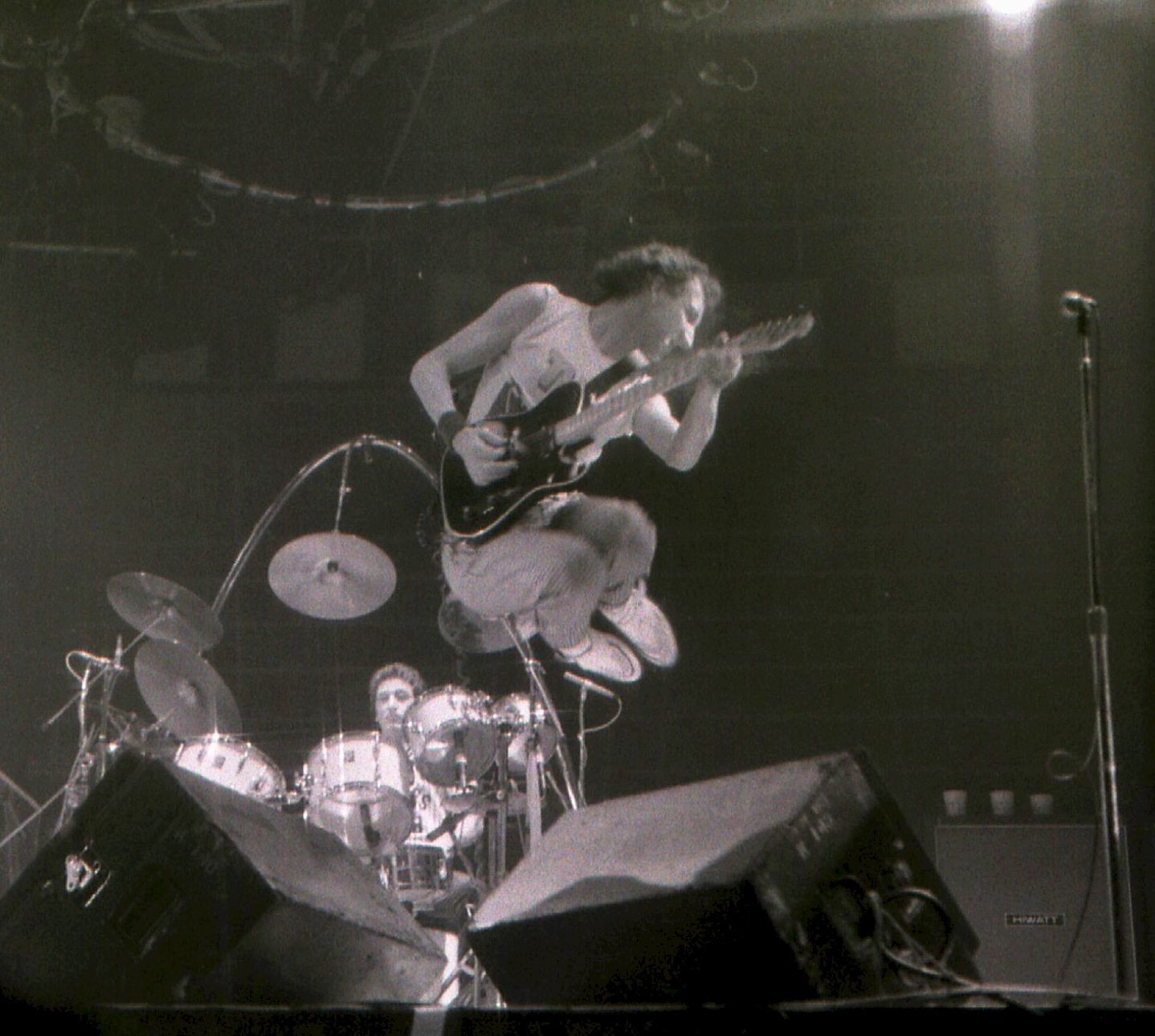
Pete Townshend from The Who leaping in the air—an example of guitar showmanship

Guitar showmanship involves gimmicks, jumps, or other stunts with a guitar. Some examples of guitar showmanship became trademarks of musicians such as Chuck Berry, Jimi Hendrix, Pete Townshend, Jimmy Page, Ritchie Blackmore, Yngwie Malmsteen, Eddie Van Halen, Stevie Ray Vaughan, Ace Frehley, and Angus Young.

== History ==
Blues musicians such as Charley Patton used stunts such as playing the guitar behind their back, and touring R&B performers further developed these stunts.

Jimi Hendrix, who spent his early career touring with R&B show bands, used some of these gimmicks in his rock sets, such as playing his guitar behind his back, in between his legs, and making it look as if he were playing it with his teeth. Other guitarists such as Joe Satriani and Zakk Wylde employ these techniques and Steve Vai has played with his tongue on several occasions. Buddy Guy has also tossed his guitar up in the air and caught it on exactly the same chord he was previously fretting. Stevie Ray Vaughan also played the guitar behind his head and behind his back.

== Chuck Berry ==
Chuck Berry's showmanship has been influential on other rock guitar players. He used a one-legged hop routine, and the "duckwalk", which he first used as a child when he walked "stooping with full-bended knees, but with my back and head vertical" under a table to retrieve a ball and his family found it entertaining; he used it when "performing in New York for the first time and some journalist branded it the duck walk.".

== Pete Townshend ==
The Who's lead guitarist and main songwriter Pete Townshend commonly plays his guitar with a fast windmill motion, inspired by watching Keith Richards' warm-up exercise. At a show in Tacoma, Washington, in 1989, he was windmilling so aggressively that he accidentally pierced his hand with the guitar's whammy bar and needed hospital treatment.

Townshend also destroys his guitar from time to time, usually at the climax of a set. The first occasion was in 1964 at the Railway Tavern in Harrow, which has a low ceiling; he raised his guitar above his head and accidentally drove the headstock into the roof smashing it off. When the audience failed to respond he proceeded to smash the rest of the guitar to pieces. He recalled that, after cracking the headstock:

I was expecting everybody to go, “Wow, he’s broken his guitar, he’s broken his guitar,” but nobody did anything, which made me kind of angry in a way. And determined to get this precious event noticed by the audience, I proceeded to make a big thing of breaking the guitar. I bounced all over the stage with it and I threw the bits on the stage and I picked up my spare guitar and carried on as though I really had meant to do it.

== Jimi Hendrix ==
Jimi Hendrix sometimes set fire to his guitar, most notably at the Monterey Pop Festival when, apparently, he felt this was the only way he could upstage the destruction by Pete Townshend and Keith Moon of the Who during their set. On March 31, 1967, at a performance at London Astoria Hendrix sustained hand burns and visited the hospital.

Hendrix was also known for having a very erotic stage presence. He would slowly sweep his hand, similar to Townshend's windmill, roll his head, and "wipe" the guitar's neck to create extra sustain.

Hendrix would also play guitar with his teeth, as well as make it look as though he was playing with his tongue, such as at the 1967 Monterey International Pop Festival during the guitar solo from his cover of the song "Hey Joe".

== Jimmy Page ==
Jimmy Page is famous for playing his guitar with a violin bow, as on the live versions of the songs "Dazed and Confused" and "How Many More Times". During Led Zeppelin's 1979 Knebworth shows, the bow was illuminated and emitted a laser beam from its tip. Page also played part of the solo of the song "Heartbreaker" holding the guitar over his head while walking across the stage, and then bending a string above the guitar nut to repeatedly change the pitch of the note. He also jumped and opened his legs wide in mid-air when playing "Rock And Roll".

== Ritchie Blackmore ==
Ritchie Blackmore often played his guitar in unusual ways during a show—stepping on it with his foot, scraping the strings across the monitors or amplifiers on stage, throwing his guitar and catching it, or swinging it around. An example of Blackmore's onstage antics appears in the California Jam in 1974, where he headlined with Deep Purple. He smashed one of his guitars on a television camera before throwing it into the crowd. In the same show one of his amplifiers blew up and set the stage on fire, but the band finished their set.

== Yngwie Malmsteen ==
The heavy metal virtuoso Yngwie Malmsteen uses a guitar stunt in which he flings the guitar around his body one or more times, held by its strap, for a "hula hoop" effect, and then brings it back to his hands. This stunt can be seen on the 2003 G3 concert video and in the music video for "I'll See the Light, Tonight".

Other people who have used the "hula hoop" stunt include Warner E. Hodges as well as Bruce Springsteen during the Super Bowl XLIII Halftime performance.

== Angus Young ==
Angus Young is famous for his wild onstage antics: intense jumps and running back and forth across the stage while playing his guitar. He scoots across the stage on his back while playing a wild solo. Young would clamber on to Bon Scott's or Brian Johnson's shoulders during concerts and they would make their way through the audience with smoke streaming from a satchel on his own back, while he played an extended guitar solo, usually during the song "Rocker" with Scott or during "Let There Be Rock" with Johnson. Young has also emulated Chuck Berry's duck-walk while playing in concert.

== Ace Frehley ==
Ace Frehley, the original lead guitarist of the rock band KISS, was known for pyrotechnic guitar gimmicks especially, such as smoke emitting through the neck pickup of the guitar via the use of a trap door, and fireworks that would be shot outward from his guitar neck.

== Spinal Tap ==
Christopher Guest, portraying lead guitarist Nigel Tufnel of the band Spın̈al Tap in the film This Is Spın̈al Tap, is shown playing one guitar while playing another with his foot in both a display and parody of guitar showmanship. Parodying Jimmy Page, Tufnel also plays his guitar using a violin, not the bow, but the instrument itself, drawing one stringed instrument across another. When performing live as Tufnel with Spinal Tap, Guest's solos were also known to include playing the guitar with his foot while juggling and playing the guitar from a distance using thrown horseshoes.

== Stevie Ray Vaughan ==
Stevie Ray Vaughan was known for his aggressive approach to the guitar; he would play his guitar behind his back whilst singing often during his song "Texas Flood". He also would play behind his head and with his teeth, techniques he undoubtedly was influenced to use by his heroes like Jimi Hendrix.

== Johnny Ramone ==
Johnny Ramone was known for playing in the influential "buzzsaw" technique, achieved by playing barre chords with rapid downstrokes on all notes in a manner similar to the spinning of a buzzsaw blade. This style later became influential to punk, post-punk, and metal music, with musicians such as Kirk Hammett, Dave Mustaine, and Iron Maiden being influenced by Johnny's guitar-playing.

== Nils Lofgren ==
Nils Lofgren played guitar while jumping from a trampoline during stage performances, but had to stop following hip replacement surgery in 2008.

== Rick Nielsen ==
Rick Nielsen of Cheap Trick used to play guitar solos on multiple guitars, strapping each of them on top of the previous one. In 1981, he played a custom-built five-necked guitar by Hamer instead. Nielsen often shows off his vast guitar collection on stage, with his five-neck guitar and a guitar built to resemble him (dubbed "Uncle Dick") being some of the most well-known of his. Nielsen was also known for frequently jumping and running across the stage during shows while playing the guitar, and chucking many guitar picks at the audience from the microphone where he sings backing vocals as well.

== See also ==
- Air guitar
